= 2026 Massachusetts House of Representatives election =

- November 3, 2026

All 160 seats in the Massachusetts House of Representatives 81 seats needed for a majority
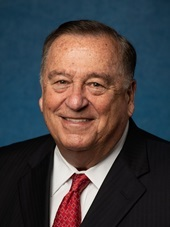

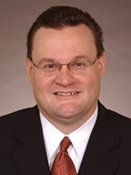

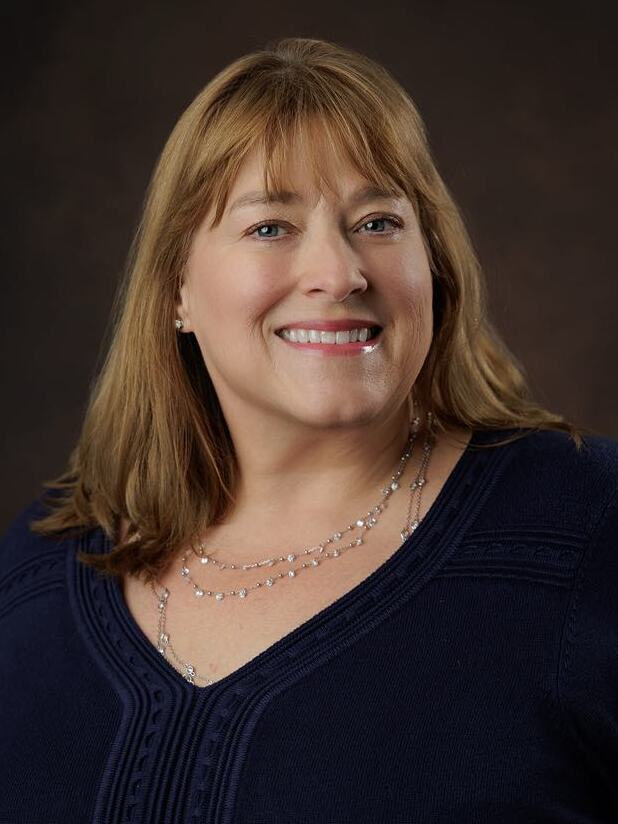
	Majority party	Minority party
Leader	Ron Mariano	Bradley Jones Jr.
Party	Democratic	Republican
Leader since	December 30, 2020	November 21, 2002
Leader's seat	3rd Norfolk	20th Middlesex
Last election	134 seats, 71.28%	25 seats, 25.60%
Seats before	134	25
Seats after	137	21
Seat change	▲3	▼4
	Third party
Leader	Susannah Whipps
Party	Independent
Leader's seat	2nd Franklin
Last election	1 seat, 1.69%
Seats before	1
Seats after	1
Seat change	Steady
- Democratic incumbent Democratic incumbent retiring Republican incumbent Republican incumbent retiring
Speaker before election
Ron Mariano
Democratic
Elected Speaker
TBD

The 2026 Massachusetts House of Representatives election was held on November 3, 2026, alongside the other 2026 United States elections. Voters elected members of the Massachusetts House of Representatives in all 160 of the U.S. state of Massachusetts's legislative districts to serve a two-year term. The election coincided with United States national elections and Massachusetts state elections, including U.S. Senate, U.S. House, Governor, and Massachusetts Senate.

== Retirements ==
=== Democrats ===
1. 1st Barnstable district: Chris Flanagan is retiring.
2. 9th Bristol district: Christopher Markey is retiring to run for Bristol County district attorney.
3. 18th Essex district: Tram Nguyen is retiring to run for United States House of Representatives.
4. 13th Middlesex district: Carmine Gentile is retiring.
5. 16th Middlesex district: Rodney Elliot is retiring.
6. 27th Middlesex district: Erika Uyterhoeven is retiring to run for State Senate.
7. 32nd Middlesex district: Kate Lipper-Garabedian is retiring to run for State Senate.
8. 34th Middlesex district: Christine Barber is retiring to run for State Senate.
9. 6th Norfolk district: William C. Galvin is retiring.
10. 2nd Worcester district: Jonathan Zlotnik is retiring.

=== Republicans ===
1. 20th Middlesex district: Bradley Jones Jr. is retiring.
2. 1st Worcester district: Kimberly Ferguson is retiring.

== Vacancies ==
=== Democrats ===
1. 6th Essex district: Jerry Parisella resigned January 2025 to become an District Court Judge. A special election was held on May 13, 2025.
2. 3rd Bristol district: Carol Doherty died February 15, 2025. A special election was held on June 10, 2025.
3. 5th Essex district: Ann-Margaret Ferrante died January 19, 2026. A special election was held on March 31, 2026.
4. 1st Franklin district: Natalie Blais resigned January 19, 2026. No special election will be held to fill the vacancy.
5. 17th Middlesex district: Vanna Howard resigned March 17, 2026 after winning a special election to the State Senate. No special election will be held to fill the vacancy.

== Predictions ==
Source	Ranking	As of
Sabato's Crystal Ball	Safe D	January 22, 2026
State Navigate	Safe D	October 21, 2026

== 2025–2026 special elections ==
Sources for special election results:

=== 2025 Special: 6th Essex ===
Primary Election Results
Party	Candidate	Votes	%
Democratic Party Primary Results
Democratic	Hannah Bowen	2,736	57.12%
Democratic	Todd C. Rotondo	2,054	42.88%
Total votes		4,790	100.00%
Republican Party Primary Results
Republican	Medley Long III	244	100.00%
Total votes		244	100.00%

General Election Results
Party	Candidate	Votes	%
Democratic	Hannah Bowen	4,092	73.81%
Republican	Medley Long III	1,452	26.19%
Total votes		5,544	100.00%
Democratic hold			

=== 2025 Special: 3rd Bristol ===
Primary Election Results
Party	Candidate	Votes	%
Democratic Party Primary Results
Democratic	Lisa Field	480	100.00%
Total votes		480	100.00%
Republican Party Primary Results
Republican	Larry Quintal	270	100.00%
Total votes		270	100.00%

General Election Results
Party	Candidate	Votes	%
Democratic	Lisa Field	2,575	50.15%
Republican	Larry Quintal	2,560	49.85%
Total votes		5,135	100.00%
Democratic hold			

=== 2026 Special: 5th Essex ===
Primary Election Results
Party	Candidate	Votes	%
Democratic Party Primary Results
Democratic	Andrew Tarr	2,194	71.40%
Democratic	Sarah Wilkinson (write-in)	879	28.60%
Total votes		3,073	100.00%
Republican Party Primary Results
Republican	Christina Delisio	568	61.47%
Republican	Ashley Sullivan	356	38.53%
Total votes		924	100.00%

General Election Results
Party	Candidate	Votes	%
Democratic	Andrew Tarr	3,513	63.80%
Republican	Christina Delisio	1,589	28.86%
Independent	Gilbert Frieden	377	6.85%
Write-in		27	0.49%
Total votes		5,506	100.00%
Democratic hold			

== Summary of results by State House district ==
State House District	2024 Pres.	Incumbent	Party	Elected Representative	Party
1st Barnstable	D+20.8	Chris Flanagan	Dem	Chris Lambton	Dem
2nd Barnstable	D+14.0	Kip Diggs	Dem	Kip Diggs	Dem
3rd Barnstable	D+17.5	David Vieira	Rep	Jack Richardson	Dem
4th Barnstable	D+38.4	Hadley Luddy	Dem	Hadley Luddy	Dem
5th Barnstable	D+4.8	Steven Xiarhos	Rep	Steven Xiarhos	Rep
Barnstable, Dukes and Nantucket	D+45.1	Thomas Moakley	Dem	Thomas Moakley	Dem
1st Berkshire	D+30.0	John Barrett	Dem	John Barrett	Dem
2nd Berkshire	D+43.2	Tricia Farley-Bouvier	Dem	Tricia Farley-Bouvier	Dem
3rd Berkshire	D+45.3	Leigh Davis	Dem	Leigh Davis	Dem
1st Bristol	D+11.5	Michael Chaisson	Rep	Michael Chaisson	Rep
2nd Bristol	D+11.0	James Hawkins	Dem	James Hawkins	Dem
3rd Bristol	D+5.6	Lisa Field (Note: Representative Carol Doherty died on February 15, 2025. Lisa Field won the subsequent special election and assumed office on July 16, 2025.)	Dem	Lisa Field	Dem
4th Bristol	R+6.3	Steven Howitt	Rep	Steven Howitt	Rep
5th Bristol	R+7.5	Justin Thurber	Rep	Justin Thurber	Rep
6th Bristol	D+0.4	Carole Fiola	Dem	Carole Fiola	Dem
7th Bristol	R+4.6	Alan Silvia	Dem	Alan Silvia	Dem
8th Bristol	R+11.7	Steven J. Ouellette	Dem	Jesse St. Gelais	Rep
9th Bristol	R+1.1	Christopher Markey	Dem	Ed Pacheco	Dem
10th Bristol	D+2.2	Mark Sylvia	Dem	Mark Sylvia	Dem
11th Bristol	D+10.8	Christopher Hendricks	Dem	Christopher Hendricks	Dem
12th Bristol	R+10.7	Norman Orrall	Rep	Norman Orrall	Rep
13th Bristol	D+13.8	Antonio Cabral	Dem	Antonio Cabral	Dem
14th Bristol	D+9.5	Adam Scanlon	Dem	Adam Scanlon	Dem
1st Essex	D+27.6	Dawne Shand	Dem	Dawne Shand	Dem
2nd Essex	D+21.3	Kristin Kassner	Dem	Kristin Kassner	Dem
3rd Essex	D+11.2	Andy Vargas	Dem	Andy Vargas	Dem
4th Essex	D+12.9	Estela Reyes	Dem	Estela Reyes	Dem
5th Essex	D+33.5	Andrew Tarr (Note: Representative Ann-Margaret Ferrante died on November 27, 2025. Andrew Tarr won the subsequent special election and assumed office on April 15, 2026.)	Dem	Andrew Tarr	Dem
6th Essex	D+34.5	Hannah Bowen (Note: Representative Jerry Parisella resigned on January 01, 2025. Hannah Bowen won the subsequent special election and assumed office on May 21, 2025.)	Dem	Hannah Bowen	Dem
7th Essex	D+45.6	Manny Cruz	Dem	Manny Cruz	Dem
8th Essex	D+38.8	Jenny Armini	Dem	Jenny Armini	Dem
9th Essex	D+2.3	Donald Wong	Rep	Donald Wong	Rep
10th Essex	D+22.2	Dan Cahill	Dem	Dan Cahill	Dem
11th Essex	D+24.4	Sean Reid	Dem	Sean Reid	Dem
12th Essex	D+7.1	Thomas Walsh	Dem	Thomas Walsh	Dem
13th Essex	D+6.5	Sally Kerans	Dem	Sally Kerans	Dem
14th Essex	D+19.9	Adrianne Ramos	Dem	Adrianne Ramos	Dem
15th Essex	D+2.6	Ryan Hamilton	Dem	Ryan Hamilton	Dem
16th Essex	D+12.1	Francisco E. Paulino	Dem	Celina Reyes	Dem
17th Essex	D+24.1	Frank A. Moran	Dem	Frank A. Moran	Dem
18th Essex	D+20.9	Tram Nguyen	Dem	Connor Murray	Dem
1st Franklin	D+44.0	Vacant	Dem	Lora Wondolowski	Dem
2nd Franklin	D+9.5	Susannah Whipps	Ind	Susannah Whipps	Ind
1st Hampden	R+7.9	Todd Smola	Rep	Todd Smola	Rep
2nd Hampden	D+8.3	Brian Ashe	Dem	Brian Ashe	Dem
3rd Hampden	R+12.6	Nicholas Boldyga	Rep	Nicholas Boldyga	Rep
4th Hampden	R+1.8	Kelly Pease	Rep	Kelly Pease	Rep
5th Hampden	D+28.5	Patricia Duffy	Dem	Patricia Duffy	Dem
6th Hampden	R+0.1	Michael Finn	Dem	Michael Finn	Dem
7th Hampden	D+12.5	Aaron Saunders	Dem	Aaron Saunders	Dem
8th Hampden	D+5.1	Shirley Arriaga	Dem	Shirley Arriaga	Dem
9th Hampden	D+28.2	Orlando Ramos	Dem	Orlando Ramos	Dem
10th Hampden	D+41.4	Carlos González	Dem	Carlos González	Dem
11th Hampden	D+44.9	Bud Williams	Dem	Bud Williams	Dem
12th Hampden	D+11.1	Angelo Puppolo	Dem	Angelo Puppolo	Dem
1st Hampshire	D+61.2	Lindsay Sabadosa	Dem	Lindsay Sabadosa	Dem
2nd Hampshire	D+34.1	Homar Gomez	Dem	Homar Gomez	Dem
3rd Hampshire	D+67.6	Mindy Domb	Dem	Mindy Domb	Dem
1st Middlesex	D+8.7	Margaret Scarsdale	Dem	Margaret Scarsdale	Dem
2nd Middlesex	D+32.1	James Arciero	Dem	James Arciero	Dem
3rd Middlesex	D+35.0	Kate Hogan	Dem	Kate Hogan	Dem
4th Middlesex	D+27.0	Danielle Gregoire	Dem	Danielle Gregoire	Dem
5th Middlesex	D+49.4	David Linsky	Dem	David Linsky	Dem
6th Middlesex	D+38.9	Priscila Sousa	Dem	Priscila Sousa	Dem
7th Middlesex	D+40.8	Jack Patrick Lewis	Dem	Jack Patrick Lewis	Dem
8th Middlesex	D+37.0	James Arena-DeRosa	Dem	James Arena-DeRosa	Dem
9th Middlesex	D+36.3	Thomas Stanley	Dem	Thomas Stanley	Dem
10th Middlesex	D+43.7	John J. Lawn	Dem	John J. Lawn	Dem
11th Middlesex	D+62.7	Amy Mah Sangiolo	Dem	Amy Mah Sangiolo	Dem
12th Middlesex	D+60.4	Greg Schwartz	Dem	Greg Schwartz	Dem
13th Middlesex	D+54.7	Carmine Gentile	Dem	Ravi Simon	Dem
14th Middlesex	D+46.8	Simon Cataldo	Dem	Simon Cataldo	Dem
15th Middlesex	D+46.8	Michelle Ciccolo	Dem	Michelle Ciccolo	Dem
16th Middlesex	D+17.4	Rodney Elliott	Dem	Lorena Betts	Dem
17th Middlesex	D+23.0	Vacant	Dem	John Drinkwater	Dem
18th Middlesex	D+27.5	Tara Hong	Dem	Tara Hong	Dem
19th Middlesex	D+1.3	Dave Robertson	Dem	Dave Robertson	Dem
20th Middlesex	D+6.4	Bradley Jones	Rep	Joseph Markey	Dem
21st Middlesex	D+30.9	Kenneth Gordon	Dem	Kenneth Gordon	Dem
22nd Middlesex	D+1.5	Marc Lombardo	Rep	Daniel Darris-O'Connor	Dem
23rd Middlesex	D+60.9	Sean Garballey	Dem	Sean Garballey	Dem
24th Middlesex	D+63.3	David Rogers	Dem	David Rogers	Dem
25th Middlesex	D+84.2	Marjorie Decker	Dem	Marjorie Decker	Dem
26th Middlesex	D+73.4	Mike Connolly	Dem	Mike Connolly	Dem
27th Middlesex	D+76.9	Erika Uyterhoeven	Dem	Ben Ewen-Campen	Dem
28th Middlesex	D+24.5	Joseph McGonagle	Dem	Joseph McGonagle	Dem
29th Middlesex	D+66.9	Steven Owens	Dem	Steven Owens	Dem
30th Middlesex	D+21.9	Richard Haggerty	Dem	Richard Haggerty	Dem
31st Middlesex	D+27.8	Michael Seamus Day	Dem	Michael Seamus Day	Dem
32nd Middlesex	D+39.1	Kate Lipper-Garabedian	Dem	Leila Migliorelli	Dem
33rd Middlesex	D+36.6	Steven Ultrino	Dem	Steven Ultrino	Dem
34th Middlesex	D+60.1	Christine Barber	Dem	Will Mbah	Dem
35th Middlesex	D+37.9	Paul Donato	Dem	Paul Donato	Dem
36th Middlesex	R+4.5	Colleen Garry	Dem	Colleen Garry	Dem
37th Middlesex	D+42.3	Danillo Sena	Dem	Danillo Sena	Dem
1st Norfolk	D+28.4	Bruce Ayers	Dem	Bruce Ayers	Dem
2nd Norfolk	D+26.1	Tackey Chan	Dem	Tackey Chan	Dem
3rd Norfolk	D+17.6	Ronald Mariano	Dem	Ronald Mariano	Dem
4th Norfolk	D+12.7	James Murphy	Dem	James Murphy	Dem
5th Norfolk	D+7.4	Mark Cusack	Dem	Mark Cusack	Dem
6th Norfolk	D+22.1	William C. Galvin	Dem	Lisa Lopez	Dem
7th Norfolk	D+43.9	Richard Wells	Dem	Richard Wells	Dem
8th Norfolk	D+31.8	Ted Philips	Dem	Ted Philips	Dem
9th Norfolk	D+12.3	Marcus Vaughn	Rep	Marcus Vaughn	Rep
10th Norfolk	D+19.2	Jeffrey Roy	Dem	Jeffrey Roy	Dem
11th Norfolk	D+27.0	Paul McMurtry	Dem	Paul McMurtry	Dem
12th Norfolk	D+18.6	John Rogers	Dem	John Rogers	Dem
13th Norfolk	D+48.2	Joshua Tarsky	Dem	Joshua Tarsky	Dem
14th Norfolk	D+49.6	Alice Peisch	Dem	Alice Peisch	Dem
15th Norfolk	D+74.9	Tommy Vitolo	Dem	Tommy Vitolo	Dem
1st Plymouth	D+8.3	Michelle Badger	Dem	Michelle Badger	Dem
2nd Plymouth	R+6.6	John Gaskey	Rep		
3rd Plymouth	D+30.0	Joan Meschino	Dem	Joan Meschino	Dem
4th Plymouth	D+14.9	Patrick Kearney	Dem	Patrick Kearney	Dem
5th Plymouth	R+0.2	David DeCoste	Rep	David DeCoste	Rep
6th Plymouth	D+5.2	Kenneth Sweezey	Rep	Kenneth Sweezey	Rep
7th Plymouth	R+3.6	Alyson Sullivan-Almeida	Rep	Alyson Sullivan-Almeida	Rep
8th Plymouth	R+3.0	Dennis Gallagher	Dem	Dennis Gallagher	Dem
9th Plymouth	D+15.5	Bridget Plouffe	Dem	Bridget Plouffe	Dem
10th Plymouth	D+39.3	Michelle DuBois	Dem	Michelle DuBois	Dem
11th Plymouth	D+54.4	Rita Mendes	Dem	Rita Mendes	Dem
12th Plymouth	D+0.6	Kathleen LaNatra	Dem	Kathleen LaNatra	Dem
1st Suffolk	D+40.6	Adrian Madaro	Dem	Adrian Madaro	Dem
2nd Suffolk	D+55.2	Daniel Ryan	Dem	Daniel Ryan	Dem
3rd Suffolk	D+54.6	Aaron Michlewitz	Dem	Aaron Michlewitz	Dem
4th Suffolk	D+27.4	David Biele	Dem	David Biele	Dem
5th Suffolk	D+67.1	Christopher Worrell	Dem	Christopher Worrell	Dem
6th Suffolk	D+72.6	Russell Holmes	Dem	Russell Holmes	Dem
7th Suffolk	D+71.4	Chynah Tyler	Dem	Chynah Tyler	Dem
8th Suffolk	D+63.7	Jay Livingstone	Dem	Jay Livingstone	Dem
9th Suffolk	D+68.0	John Moran	Dem	John Moran	Dem
10th Suffolk	D+47.2	William MacGregor	Dem	William MacGregor	Dem
11th Suffolk	D+35.3	Judith García	Dem	Judith García	Dem
12th Suffolk	D+73.0	Brandy Fluker Oakley	Dem	Brandy Fluker Oakley	Dem
13th Suffolk	D+36.1	Daniel Hunt	Dem	Daniel Hunt	Dem
14th Suffolk	D+56.1	Rob Consalvo	Dem	Rob Consalvo	Dem
15th Suffolk	D+77.9	Samantha Montano	Dem	Samantha Montano	Dem
16th Suffolk	R+0.3	Jessica Ann Giannino	Dem	Jessica Ann Giannino	Dem
17th Suffolk	D+66.7	Kevin Honan	Dem	Kevin Honan	Dem
18th Suffolk	D+59.1	Michael Moran	Dem	Michael Moran	Dem
19th Suffolk	D+14.9	Jeffrey Turco	Dem	Jeffrey Turco	Dem
1st Worcester	D+6.9	Kimberly Ferguson	Rep	Krista Ferrante	Dem
2nd Worcester	R+2.2	Jonathan Zlotnik	Dem	Michael Nicholson	Dem
3rd Worcester	D+11.7	Michael Kushmerek	Dem	Michael Kushmerek	Dem
4th Worcester	D+9.2	Natalie Higgins	Dem	Natalie Higgins	Dem
5th Worcester	R+10.0	Donald Berthiaume	Rep	Donald Berthiaume	Rep
6th Worcester	R+7.3	John Marsi	Rep	John Marsi	Rep
7th Worcester	R+0.5	Paul Frost	Rep	Paul Frost	Rep
8th Worcester	R+2.4	Michael Soter	Rep	Michael Soter	Rep
9th Worcester	D+12.4	David Muradian	Rep	David Muradian	Rep
10th Worcester	D+11.1	Brian Murray	Dem	Brian Murray	Dem
11th Worcester	D+23.1	Hannah Kane	Rep	Hannah Kane	Rep
12th Worcester	D+13.9	Meghan Kilcoyne	Dem	Meghan Kilcoyne	Dem
13th Worcester	D+32.9	John Mahoney	Dem	John Mahoney	Dem
14th Worcester	D+26.7	James O'Day	Dem	James O'Day	Dem
15th Worcester	D+31.4	Mary Keefe	Dem	Mary Keefe	Dem
16th Worcester	D+19.2	Daniel Donahue	Dem	Daniel Donahue	Dem
17th Worcester	D+17.7	David LeBoeuf	Dem	David LeBoeuf	Dem
18th Worcester	R+9.9	Joseph McKenna	Rep	Joseph McKenna	Rep
19th Worcester	D+37.5	Kate Donaghue	Dem	Kate Donaghue	Dem

== Detailed results ==
Candidate lists according to the Secretary of the Commonwealth of Massachusetts.

Sources for election results:

=== 1st Barnstable ===
Incumbent Democrat Chris Flanagan, who was indicted in April 2025 on five counts of wire fraud and one count of falsification of records, declined to seek re-election. Two candidates have qualified for the Democratic primary. No candidates filed to run in the Republican primary.

==== Democratic primary ====
===== Candidates =====
====== Declared ======
- Chris Lambton, Dennis select board member and former television personality
- Steven Leibowitz, former Brewster school committee member

====== Declined ======
- Chris Flanagan, incumbent state representative (2023–present)

Democratic primary
Party	Candidate	Votes	%
Democratic	Chris Lambton		
Democratic	Steven Leibowitz		
Total votes			

=== 2nd Barnstable ===
Incumbent Democrat Kip Diggs is running for re-election. No candidates filed to run in the Republican primary.

Democratic primary
Party	Candidate	Votes	%
Democratic	Kip Diggs (incumbent)		
Total votes			

=== 3rd Barnstable ===
Incumbent Republican David Vieira is running for re-election and is unopposed in the Republican primary. Jack P. Richardson, a member of the Falmouth select board, is running unopposed for the Democratic nomination.

Republican primary
Party	Candidate	Votes	%
Republican	David Vieira (incumbent)		
Total votes			

Democratic primary
Party	Candidate	Votes	%
Democratic	Jack P. Richardson		
Total votes			

=== 4th Barnstable ===
Incumbent Democrat Hadley Luddy is running for re-election. No candidates filed to run in the Republican primary.

Democratic primary
Party	Candidate	Votes	%
Democratic	Hadley Luddy (incumbent)		
Total votes			

=== 5th Barnstable ===
Incumbent Republican Steven Xiarhos is running for re-election. No candidates filed to run in the Democratic primary.

Republican primary
Party	Candidate	Votes	%
Republican	Steven Xiarhos (incumbent)		
Total votes			

=== Barnstable, Dukes and Nantucket ===
Incumbent Democrat Thomas Moakley is running for re-election. No candidates filed to run in the Republican primary.

Democratic primary
Party	Candidate	Votes	%
Democratic	Thomas Moakley (incumbent)		
Total votes			

=== 1st Berkshire ===
Incumbent Democrat John Barrett is running for re-election and faces Andrew Fitch, vice president of the North Adams City Council, in the Democratic primary. No candidates filed to run in the Republican primary.

==== Democratic primary ====
===== Candidates =====
====== Declared ======
- John Barrett, incumbent state representative (2017–present)
- Andrew Fitch, vice president of the North Adams City Council

===== Endorsements =====
Andrew Fitch

Organizations

- LGBTQ+ Victory Fund

Democratic primary
Party	Candidate	Votes	%
Democratic	John Barrett (incumbent)		
Democratic	Andrew Fitch		
Total votes			

=== 2nd Berkshire ===
Incumbent Democrat Tricia Farley-Bouvier is running for re-election. No candidates filed to run in the Republican primary.

Democratic primary
Party	Candidate	Votes	%
Democratic	Tricia Farley-Bouvier (incumbent)		
Total votes			

=== 3rd Berkshire ===
Incumbent Democrat Leigh Davis is running for re-election. No candidates filed to run in the Republican primary.

Democratic primary
Party	Candidate	Votes	%
Democratic	Leigh Davis (incumbent)		
Total votes			

=== 1st Bristol ===
Incumbent Republican Michael Chaisson is running for re-election. No candidates filed to run in the Democratic primary.

Republican primary
Party	Candidate	Votes	%
Republican	Michael Chaisson (incumbent)		
Total votes			

=== 2nd Bristol ===
Incumbent Democrat Jim Hawkins is running for re-election. No candidates filed to run in the Republican primary.

Democratic primary
Party	Candidate	Votes	%
Democratic	Jim Hawkins (incumbent)		
Total votes			

=== 3rd Bristol ===
Incumbent Democrat Lisa Field is running for re-election and faces Taunton police chief Ed Walsh in the Democratic primary. Larry Quintal, a Taunton city councilor and Republican nominee in the special election for this seat in 2025, is running unopposed for the Republican nomination.

Democratic primary
Party	Candidate	Votes	%
Democratic	Lisa Field (incumbent)		
Democratic	Ed Walsh		
Total votes			

Republican primary
Party	Candidate	Votes	%
Republican	Larry Quintal		
Total votes			

=== 4th Bristol ===
Incumbent Republican Steven S. Howitt is running for re-election. No candidates filed to run in the Democratic primary.

Republican primary
Party	Candidate	Votes	%
Republican	Steven S. Howitt (incumbent)		
Total votes			

=== 5th Bristol ===
Incumbent Republican Justin Thurber is running for re-election and is unopposed in the Republican primary. Jamison Souza, a member of the Somerset select board, is running unopposed for the Democratic nomination.

Republican primary
Party	Candidate	Votes	%
Republican	Justin Thurber (incumbent)		
Total votes			

Democratic primary
Party	Candidate	Votes	%
Democratic	Jamison Souza		
Total votes			

=== 6th Bristol ===
Incumbent Democrat Carole Fiola is running for re-election and is unopposed in the Democratic primary. Robert Anctil, a former member of the Berkley select board, is running unopposed for the Republican nomination.

Democratic primary
Party	Candidate	Votes	%
Democratic	Carole Fiola (incumbent)		
Total votes			

Republican primary
Party	Candidate	Votes	%
Republican	Robert Anctil		
Total votes			

=== 7th Bristol ===
Incumbent Democrat Alan Silvia is running for re-election and is unopposed in the Democratic primary. Talos Farris, director of veterans services for the City of Fall River, is running unopposed for the Republican nomination.

Democratic primary
Party	Candidate	Votes	%
Democratic	Alan Silvia (incumbent)		
Total votes			

Republican primary
Party	Candidate	Votes	%
Republican	Talos Farris		
Total votes			

=== 8th Bristol ===
Incumbent Democrat Steven Ouellette is running for re-election and is unopposed in the Democratic primary. He will face the winner of the Republican primary, which is being contested by Jesse St. Gelais and Christopher Thrasher.

Democratic primary
Party	Candidate	Votes	%
Democratic	Steven Ouellette (incumbent)		
Total votes			

Republican primary
Party	Candidate	Votes	%
Republican	Jesse St. Gelais		
Republican	Christopher Thrasher		
Total votes			

=== 9th Bristol ===
Incumbent Democrat Christopher Markey is retiring to run for Bristol County district attorney. Four candidates, two Democrats and two Republicans, have qualified for their respective primaries.

==== Democratic primary ====
===== Candidates =====
====== Declared ======
- Stephen J. Medeiros, former Dartmouth Town Meeting member
- Ed Pacheco, evening security officer for Dartmouth Public Schools

====== Declined ======
- Christopher Markey, incumbent state representative (2011–present)

Democratic primary
Party	Candidate	Votes	%
Democratic	Stephen J. Medeiros		
Democratic	Ed Pacheco		
Total votes			

==== Republican primary ====
===== Candidates =====
====== Declared ======
- Henry Bousquet, former New Bedford city councilor
- Chester Tam, vice chair of operations and digital media for Donald Trump 2024's presidential campaign

Republican primary
Party	Candidate	Votes	%
Republican	Henry Bousquet		
Republican	Chester Tam		
Total votes			

=== 10th Bristol ===
Incumbent Democrat Mark Sylvia is running for re-election. No candidates filed to run in the Republican primary.

Democratic primary
Party	Candidate	Votes	%
Democratic	Mark Sylvia (incumbent)		
Total votes			

=== 11th Bristol ===
Incumbent Democrat Christopher Hendricks is running for re-election. No candidates filed to run in the Republican primary.

Democratic primary
Party	Candidate	Votes	%
Democratic	Christopher Hendricks (incumbent)		
Total votes			

=== 12th Bristol ===
Incumbent Republican Norman Orrall is running for re-election. No candidates filed to run in the Democratic primary.

Republican primary
Party	Candidate	Votes	%
Republican	Norman Orrall (incumbent)		
Total votes			

=== 13th Bristol ===
Incumbent Democrat Antonio Cabral is running for re-election. No candidates filed to run in the Republican primary.

Democratic primary
Party	Candidate	Votes	%
Democratic	Antonio Cabral (incumbent)		
Total votes			

=== 14th Bristol ===
Incumbent Democrat Adam Scanlon is running for re-election. No candidates filed to run in the Republican primary.

Democratic primary
Party	Candidate	Votes	%
Democratic	Adam Scanlon (incumbent)		
Total votes			

=== 1st Essex ===
Incumbent Democrat Dawne Shand is running for re-election and faces Stephen Roth, a Salisbury attorney, in the Democratic primary. No candidates filed to run in the Republican primary.

Democratic primary
Party	Candidate	Votes	%
Democratic	Dawne Shand (incumbent)		
Democratic	Stephen Roth		
Total votes			

=== 2nd Essex ===
Incumbent Democrat Kristin Kassner is running for re-election and is unopposed in the Democratic primary. Dan Kelly, a retired lawyer from Ipswich, is running unopposed for the Republican nomination.

Democratic primary
Party	Candidate	Votes	%
Democratic	Kristin Kassner (incumbent)		
Total votes			

Republican primary
Party	Candidate	Votes	%
Republican	Dan Kelly		
Total votes			

=== 3rd Essex ===
Incumbent Democrat Andy Vargas is running for re-election. No candidates filed to run in the Republican primary.

Democratic primary
Party	Candidate	Votes	%
Democratic	Andy Vargas (incumbent)		
Total votes			

=== 4th Essex ===
Incumbent Democrat Estela Reyes is running for re-election. No candidates filed to run in the Republican primary.

Democratic primary
Party	Candidate	Votes	%
Democratic	Estela Reyes (incumbent)		
Total votes			

=== 5th Essex ===
Incumbent Democrat Andrew "Dru" Tarr is running for re-election and faces Sarah Wilkinson, a former Rockport select board member and write-in candidate for this seat in the 2026 special election, in the Democratic primary. Christine Delisio is running unopposed for the Republican nomination.

Democratic primary
Party	Candidate	Votes	%
Democratic	Andrew "Dru" Tarr (incumbent)		
Democratic	Sarah Wilkinson		
Total votes			

Republican primary
Party	Candidate	Votes	%
Republican	Christine Delisio		
Total votes			

=== 6th Essex ===
Incumbent Democrat Hannah Bowen is running for re-election. No candidates filed to run in the Republican primary.

Democratic primary
Party	Candidate	Votes	%
Democratic	Hannah Bowen (incumbent)		
Total votes			

=== 7th Essex ===
Incumbent Democrat Manny Cruz is running for re-election. No candidates filed to run in the Republican primary.

Democratic primary
Party	Candidate	Votes	%
Democratic	Manny Cruz (incumbent)		
Total votes			

=== 8th Essex ===
Incumbent Democrat Jenny Armini is running for re-election. No candidates filed to run in the Republican primary.

Democratic primary
Party	Candidate	Votes	%
Democratic	Jenny Armini (incumbent)		
Total votes			

=== 9th Essex ===
Incumbent Republican Donald Wong is running for re-election and is unopposed in the Republican primary. He will face the winner of the Democratic primary, which is being contested by Peter Meaney, a Lynn city councilor, and Zosia VanMeter, director of the City of Lynn's Inspectional Division.

Republican primary
Party	Candidate	Votes	%
Republican	Donald Wong (incumbent)		
Total votes			

Democratic primary
Party	Candidate	Votes	%
Democratic	Peter Meaney		
Democratic	Zosia VanMeter		
Total votes			

=== 10th Essex ===
Incumbent Democrat Daniel Cahill is running for re-election. No candidates filed to run in the Republican primary.

Democratic primary
Party	Candidate	Votes	%
Democratic	Daniel Cahill (incumbent)		
Total votes			

=== 11th Essex ===
Incumbent Democrat Sean Reid is running for re-election. No candidates filed to run in the Republican primary.

Democratic primary
Party	Candidate	Votes	%
Democratic	Sean Reid (incumbent)		
Total votes			

=== 12th Essex ===
Incumbent Democrat Thomas Walsh is running for re-election. No candidates filed to run in the Republican primary.

Democratic primary
Party	Candidate	Votes	%
Democratic	Thomas Walsh (incumbent)		
Total votes			

=== 13th Essex ===
Incumbent Democrat Sally Kerans is running for re-election. No candidates filed to run in the Republican primary.

Democratic primary
Party	Candidate	Votes	%
Democratic	Sally Kerans (incumbent)		
Total votes			

=== 14th Essex ===
Incumbent Democrat Adrianne Ramos is running for re-election. No candidates filed to run in the Republican primary.

Democratic primary
Party	Candidate	Votes	%
Democratic	Adrianne Ramos (incumbent)		
Total votes			

=== 15th Essex ===
Incumbent Democrat Ryan Hamilton is running for re-election and is unopposed in the Democratic primary. Ronald Heiseler III, a chip design engineer, is running unopposed for the Republican nomination.

Democratic primary
Party	Candidate	Votes	%
Democratic	Daniel Cahill (incumbent)		
Total votes			

Republican primary
Party	Candidate	Votes	%
Republican	Ronald Heiseler III		
Total votes			

=== 16th Essex ===
Incumbent Democrat Francisco E. Paulino is running for re-election and faces Celina Reyes, a Lawrence at-large city councilor, in the Democratic primary. No candidates filed to run in the Republican primary.

==== Democratic primary ====
===== Candidates =====
====== Declared ======
- Francisco E. Paulino, incumbent state representative (2023–present)
- Celina Reyes, Lawrence at-large city councilor

===== Endorsements =====
Celina Reyes

Organizations

- Massachusetts Working Families Party

Democratic primary
Party	Candidate	Votes	%
Democratic	Francisco E. Paulino (incumbent)		
Democratic	Celina Reyes		
Total votes			

=== 17th Essex ===
Incumbent Democrat Frank A. Moran is running for re-election. No candidates filed to run in the Republican primary.

Democratic primary
Party	Candidate	Votes	%
Democratic	Frank A. Moran (incumbent)		
Total votes			

=== 18th Essex ===
Incumbent Democrat Tram Nguyen is retiring to run for United States House of Representatives. Connor Murray of Andover is running unopposed in the Democratic primary. Christopher Shepley, an Andover school committee member, has launched a write-in campaign for the Republican nomination after failing to qualify for the ballot.

Democratic primary
Party	Candidate	Votes	%
Democratic	Connor Murray		
Total votes			

Republican primary
Party	Candidate	Votes	%
Republican	Christopher Shepley (write-in)		
Total votes			

=== 1st Franklin ===
The seat became vacant following the January 2026 resignation of incumbent Natalie Blais, who left to become the associate vice chancellor of government relations at UMass Amherst. Two candidates have qualified for the Democratic primary. No candidates filed to run for the Republican nomination.

==== Democratic primary ====
===== Candidates =====
====== Declared ======
- Corinne Coryat, former aide to Representative Natalie Blais
- Lora Wondolowski, president of the Greenfield City Council

Democratic primary
Party	Candidate	Votes	%
Democratic	Corinne Coryat		
Democratic	Lora Wondolowski		
Total votes			

=== 2nd Franklin ===
Incumbent independent Susannah Whipps is running for re-election. No candidates filed to run in the Democratic or Republican primaries.

General election
Party	Candidate	Votes	%
Independent	Susannah Whipps (incumbent)		
Total votes			

=== 1st Hampden ===
Incumbent Republican Todd Smola is running for re-election. No candidates filed to run in the Democratic primary.

Republican primary
Party	Candidate	Votes	%
Republican	Todd Smola (incumbent)		
Total votes			

=== 2nd Hampden ===
Incumbent Democrat Brian Ashe is running for re-election and is unopposed in the Democratic primary. Peter Warren, a member of the Monson select board, is running unopposed for the Republican nomination.

Democratic primary
Party	Candidate	Votes	%
Democratic	Brian Ashe (incumbent)		
Total votes			

Republican primary
Party	Candidate	Votes	%
Republican	Peter Warren		
Total votes			

=== 3rd Hampden ===
Incumbent Republican Nicholas Boldyga is running for re-election and is unopposed in the Republican primary. Thomas D. Hendrickson, an Agawam city councilor, is running unopposed for the Democratic nomination.

Republican primary
Party	Candidate	Votes	%
Republican	Nicholas Boldyga (incumbent)		
Total votes			

Democratic primary
Party	Candidate	Votes	%
Democratic	Thomas D. Hendrickson		
Total votes			

=== 4th Hampden ===
Incumbent Republican Kelly Pease is running for re-election and is unopposed in the Republican primary. Colby Hoffman of Westfield is running unopposed for the Democratic nomination.

Republican primary
Party	Candidate	Votes	%
Republican	Kelly Pease (incumbent)		
Total votes			

Democratic primary
Party	Candidate	Votes	%
Democratic	Colby Hoffman		
Total votes			

=== 5th Hampden ===
Incumbent Democrat Patricia Duffy is running for re-election and faces Dori Dean, a member of the Massachusetts Democratic State Committee, in the Democratic primary. No candidates filed to run in the Republican primary.

Democratic primary
Party	Candidate	Votes	%
Democratic	Patricia Duffy (incumbent)		
Democratic	Dori Dean		
Total votes			

=== 6th Hampden ===
Incumbent Democrat Michael Finn is running for re-election. No candidates filed to run in the Republican primary.

Democratic primary
Party	Candidate	Votes	%
Democratic	Michael Finn (incumbent)		
Total votes			

=== 7th Hampden ===
Incumbent Democrat Aaron Saunders is running for re-election. No candidates filed to run in the Republican primary.

Democratic primary
Party	Candidate	Votes	%
Democratic	Aaron Saunders (incumbent)		
Total votes			

=== 8th Hampden ===
Incumbent Democrat Shirley Arriaga is running for re-election. No candidates filed to run in the Republican primary.

Democratic primary
Party	Candidate	Votes	%
Democratic	Shirley Arriaga (incumbent)		
Total votes			

=== 9th Hampden ===
Incumbent Democrat Orlando Ramos is running for re-election. No candidates filed to run in the Republican primary.

Democratic primary
Party	Candidate	Votes	%
Democratic	Orlando Ramos (incumbent)		
Total votes			

=== 10th Hampden ===
Incumbent Democrat Carlos González is running for re-election. No candidates filed to run in the Republican primary.

Democratic primary
Party	Candidate	Votes	%
Democratic	Carlos González (incumbent)		
Total votes			

=== 11th Hampden ===
Incumbent Democrat Bud Williams is running for re-election and faces two challengers in the Democratic primary. No candidates filed to run in the Republican primary.

==== Democratic primary ====
===== Candidates =====
====== Declared ======
- Bud Williams, incumbent state representative (2017–present)
- Nicole Coakley, mental health clinician
- Johnnie McKnight, candidate for this seat in 2024

===== Endorsements =====
Johnnie McKnight

Organizations

- Massachusetts Working Families Party

Democratic primary
Party	Candidate	Votes	%
Democratic	Bud Williams (incumbent)		
Democratic	Nicole Coakley		
Democratic	Johnnie McKnight		
Total votes			

=== 12th Hampden ===
Incumbent Democrat Angelo Puppolo is running for re-election and faces Michael Lachenmeyer, a local activist, in the Democratic primary. No candidates filed to run in the Republican primary.

Democratic primary
Party	Candidate	Votes	%
Democratic	Angelo Puppolo (incumbent)		
Democratic	Michael Lachenmeyer		
Total votes			

=== 1st Hampshire ===
Incumbent Democrat Lindsay Sabadosa is running for re-election. No candidates filed to run in the Republican primary.

Democratic primary
Party	Candidate	Votes	%
Democratic	Lindsay Sabadosa (incumbent)		
Total votes			

=== 2nd Hampshire ===
Incumbent Democrat Homar Gomez is running for re-election. No candidates filed to run in the Republican primary.

Democratic primary
Party	Candidate	Votes	%
Democratic	Homar Gomez (incumbent)		
Total votes			

=== 3rd Hampshire ===
Incumbent Democrat Mindy Domb is running for re-election. No candidates filed to run in the Republican primary.

Democratic primary
Party	Candidate	Votes	%
Democratic	Mindy Domb (incumbent)		
Total votes			

=== 1st Middlesex ===
Incumbent Democrat Margaret Scarsdale is running for re-election and is unopposed in the Democratic primary. She will face the winner of the Republican primary, which is being contested by Chris Lyons, a restaurateur, and Glenn McLeod, a member of the Lunenburg select board.

Democratic primary
Party	Candidate	Votes	%
Democratic	Margaret Scarsdale (incumbent)		
Total votes			

Republican primary
Party	Candidate	Votes	%
Republican	Chris Lyons		
Republican	Glenn McLeod		
Total votes			

=== 2nd Middlesex ===
Incumbent Democrat James Arciero is running for re-election. No candidates filed to run in the Republican primary.

Democratic primary
Party	Candidate	Votes	%
Democratic	James Arciero (incumbent)		
Total votes			

=== 3rd Middlesex ===
Incumbent Democrat Kate Hogan is running for re-election. No candidates filed to run in the Republican primary.

Democratic primary
Party	Candidate	Votes	%
Democratic	Kate Hogan (incumbent)		
Total votes			

=== 4th Middlesex ===
Incumbent Democrat Danielle Gregoire is running for re-election. No candidates filed to run in the Republican primary.

Democratic primary
Party	Candidate	Votes	%
Democratic	Danielle Gregoire (incumbent)		
Total votes			

=== 5th Middlesex ===
Incumbent Democrat David Linsky is running for re-election and is unopposed in the Democratic primary. Luisa Cestari, a real estate agent, is running unopposed for the Republican nomination.

Democratic primary
Party	Candidate	Votes	%
Democratic	David Linsky (incumbent)		
Total votes			

Republican primary
Party	Candidate	Votes	%
Republican	Luisa Cestari		
Total votes			

=== 6th Middlesex ===
Incumbent Democrat Priscila Sousa is running for re-election. No candidates filed to run in the Republican primary.

Democratic primary
Party	Candidate	Votes	%
Democratic	Priscila Sousa (incumbent)		
Total votes			

=== 7th Middlesex ===
Incumbent Democrat Jack Patrick Lewis is running for re-election. No candidates filed to run in the Republican primary.

Democratic primary
Party	Candidate	Votes	%
Democratic	Jack Patrick Lewis (incumbent)		
Total votes			

=== 8th Middlesex ===
Incumbent Democrat James Arena-DeRosa is running for re-election. No candidates filed to run in the Republican primary.

Democratic primary
Party	Candidate	Votes	%
Democratic	James Arena-DeRosa (incumbent)		
Total votes			

=== 9th Middlesex ===
Incumbent Democrat Thomas M. Stanley is running for re-election. No candidates filed to run in the Republican primary.

Democratic primary
Party	Candidate	Votes	%
Democratic	Thomas M. Stanley (incumbent)		
Total votes			

=== 10th Middlesex ===
Incumbent Democrat John J. Lawn is running for re-election and faces Alison Leary, a Newton city councilor, in the Democratic primary. No candidates filed to run in the Republican primary.

Democratic primary
Party	Candidate	Votes	%
Democratic	John J. Lawn (incumbent)		
Democratic	Alison Leary		
Total votes			

=== 11th Middlesex ===
Incumbent Democrat Amy Mah Sangiolo is running for re-election. No candidates filed to run in the Republican primary.

Democratic primary
Party	Candidate	Votes	%
Democratic	Amy Mah Sangiolo (incumbent)		
Total votes			

=== 12th Middlesex ===
Incumbent Democrat Greg Schwartz is running for re-election. No candidates filed to run in the Republican primary.

Democratic primary
Party	Candidate	Votes	%
Democratic	Greg Schwartz (incumbent)		
Total votes			

=== 13th Middlesex ===
Incumbent Democrat Carmine Gentile is retiring. Ravi Simon, a longtime aide to Gentile, is running unopposed in the Democratic primary. No candidates filed to run in the Republican primary.

Democratic primary
Party	Candidate	Votes	%
Democratic	Ravi Simon		
Total votes			

=== 14th Middlesex ===
Incumbent Democrat Simon Cataldo is running for re-election. No candidates filed to run in the Republican primary.

Democratic primary
Party	Candidate	Votes	%
Democratic	Simon Cataldo (incumbent)		
Total votes			

=== 15th Middlesex ===
Incumbent Democrat Michelle Ciccolo is running for re-election. No candidates filed to run in the Republican primary.

Democratic primary
Party	Candidate	Votes	%
Democratic	Michelle Ciccolo (incumbent)		
Total votes			

=== 16th Middlesex ===
Incumbent Democrat Rodney Elliott is retiring. Two candidates filed to run in the Democratic primary. Karla Miller of Lowell, the Republican nominee for the Massachusetts Senate's 1st Middlesex district in 2024, is running unopposed for the Republican nomination.

==== Democratic primary ====
===== Candidates =====
====== Declared ======
- Lorena Betts, former aide to Representative Dan Sena
- Corey Robinson, member of the Lowell City Council

====== Declined ======
- Rodney Elliott, incumbent state representative (2023–present)

===== Endorsements =====
Lorena Betts

Organizations

- Massachusetts Working Families Party

Democratic primary
Party	Candidate	Votes	%
Democratic	Lorena Betts		
Democratic	Corey Robinson		
Total votes			

Republican primary
Party	Candidate	Votes	%
Republican	Karla Miller		
Total votes			

=== 17th Middlesex ===
The seat became vacant following the March 2026 resignation of incumbent Vanna Howard, who was elected to the State Senate. Three candidates filed to run in the Democratic primary. No candidates filed to run in the Republican primary.

==== Democratic primary ====
===== Candidates =====
====== Declared ======
- Harini Aiyer, salesperson
- John Drinkwater, former Lowell city councilor
- Anthony Leite, Lowell firefighter

===== Endorsements =====
John Drinkwater

Organizations

- Massachusetts Working Families Party

Democratic primary
Party	Candidate	Votes	%
Democratic	Harini Aiyer		
Democratic	John Drinkwater		
Democratic	Anthony Leite		
Total votes			

=== 18th Middlesex ===
Incumbent Democrat Tara Hong is running for re-election and faces Sokhary Chau, a Lowell city councilor and former mayor, in the Democratic primary. No candidates filed to run in the Republican primary.

==== Democratic primary ====
===== Candidates =====
====== Declared ======
- Tara Hong, incumbent state representative (2025–present)
- Sokhary Chau, former mayor of Lowell

===== Endorsements =====
Tara Hong

Organizations

- Massachusetts Working Families Party

Democratic primary
Party	Candidate	Votes	%
Democratic	Tara Hong (incumbent)		
Democratic	Sokhary Chau		
Total votes			

=== 19th Middlesex ===
Incumbent Democrat Dave Robertson is running for re-election. No candidates filed to run in the Republican primary.

Democratic primary
Party	Candidate	Votes	%
Democratic	Dave Robertson (incumbent)		
Total votes			

=== 20th Middlesex ===
Incumbent Republican Bradley Jones Jr. is retiring. Joseph Markey, former Lynnfield town moderator, is running unopposed in the Democratic primary. Trevor Currier, a member of the Masconomet Regional School Committee, is running unopposed for the Republican nomination.

Democratic primary
Party	Candidate	Votes	%
Democratic	Joseph Markey		
Total votes			

Republican primary
Party	Candidate	Votes	%
Republican	Trevor Currier		
Total votes			

=== 21st Middlesex ===
Incumbent Democrat Ken Gordon is running for re-election. No candidates filed to run in the Republican primary.

Democratic primary
Party	Candidate	Votes	%
Democratic	Ken Gordon (incumbent)		
Total votes			

=== 22nd Middlesex ===
Incumbent Republican Marc Lombardo is running for re-election and is unopposed in the Republican primary. Daniel Darris-O'Connor, a member of the Billerica select board, is running unopposed for the Democratic nomination.

Republican primary
Party	Candidate	Votes	%
Republican	Marc Lombardo (incumbent)		
Total votes			

Democratic primary
Party	Candidate	Votes	%
Democratic	Daniel Darris-O'Connor		
Total votes			

=== 23rd Middlesex ===
Incumbent Democrat Sean Garballey is running for re-election. No candidates filed to run in the Republican primary.

Democratic primary
Party	Candidate	Votes	%
Democratic	Sean Garballey (incumbent)		
Total votes			

=== 24th Middlesex ===
Incumbent Democrat Dave Rogers running for re-election and faces Nomita Ganguly, an attorney and legislative advocate, in the Democratic primary. No candidates filed to run in the Republican primary.

==== Democratic primary ====
===== Candidates =====
====== Declared ======
- Dave Rogers, incumbent state representative (2013–present)
- Nomita Ganguly, attorney and legislative advocate

Democratic primary
Party	Candidate	Votes	%
Democratic	Dave Rogers (incumbent)		
Democratic	Nomita Ganguly		
Total votes			

=== 25th Middlesex ===
Incumbent Democrat Marjorie Decker running for re-election and faces Evan MacKay, a union organizer and candidate for this seat in 2024, in the Democratic primary. No candidates filed to run in the Republican primary.

==== Democratic primary ====
===== Candidates =====
====== Declared ======
- Marjorie Decker, incumbent state representative (2013–present)
- Evan MacKay, union organizer and candidate for this seat in 2024

Democratic primary
Party	Candidate	Votes	%
Democratic	Marjorie Decker (incumbent)		
Democratic	Evan MacKay		
Total votes			

=== 26th Middlesex ===
Incumbent Democrat Mike Connolly running for re-election and faces Neil Miller, a data analyst, in the Democratic primary. No candidates filed to run in the Republican primary.

==== Democratic primary ====
===== Candidates =====
====== Declared ======
- Mike Connolly, incumbent state representative (2017–present)
- Neil Miller, data analyst

Democratic primary
Party	Candidate	Votes	%
Democratic	Mike Connolly (incumbent)		
Democratic	Neil Miller		
Total votes			

=== 27th Middlesex ===
Incumbent Democrat Erika Uyterhoeven is retiring to run for State Senate. Two candidates filed to run in the Democratic primary. No candidates filed to run in the Republican primary.

==== Democratic primary ====
===== Candidates =====
====== Declared ======
- Ben Ewen-Campen, member of the Somerville City Council
- Olivia Gilligan-Corsetti, educator and former aide to Governor Maura Healey

====== Declined ======
- Erika Uyterhoeven, incumbent state representative (2021–present)

Democratic primary
Party	Candidate	Votes	%
Democratic	Ben Ewen-Campen		
Democratic	Olivia Gilligan-Corsetti		
Total votes			

=== 28th Middlesex ===
Incumbent Democrat Joe McGonagle is running for re-election. No candidates filed to run in the Republican primary.

Democratic primary
Party	Candidate	Votes	%
Democratic	Joe McGonagle (incumbent)		
Total votes			

=== 29th Middlesex ===
Incumbent Democrat Steven Owens is running for re-election. No candidates filed to run in the Republican primary.

Democratic primary
Party	Candidate	Votes	%
Democratic	Steven Owens (incumbent)		
Total votes			

=== 30th Middlesex ===
Incumbent Democrat Richard Haggerty is running for re-election and faces Jadon Wilson, a hospitality supervisor, in the Democratic primary. No candidates filed to run in the Republican primary.

Democratic primary
Party	Candidate	Votes	%
Democratic	Richard Haggerty (incumbent)		
Democratic	Jadon Wilson		
Total votes			

=== 31st Middlesex ===
Incumbent Democrat Michael S. Day is running for re-election and is unopposed in the Democratic primary. Stephen Ternullo, a resident of Stoneham, is running unopposed for the Republican nomination.

Democratic primary
Party	Candidate	Votes	%
Democratic	Michael S. Day (incumbent)		
Total votes			

Republican primary
Party	Candidate	Votes	%
Republican	Stephen Ternullo		
Total votes			

=== 32nd Middlesex ===
Incumbent Democrat Kate Lipper-Garabedian is retiring to run for State Senate. Two candidates filed to run in the Democratic primary. No candidates filed to run in the Republican primary.

==== Democratic primary ====
===== Candidates =====
====== Declared ======
- Jay Higgins, aide to U.S. Representative Katherine Clark
- Leila Migliorelli, Melrose city councilor

====== Declined ======
- Kate Lipper-Garabedian, incumbent state representative (2020–present)

Democratic primary
Party	Candidate	Votes	%
Democratic	Jay Higgins		
Democratic	Leila Migliorelli		
Total votes			

=== 33rd Middlesex ===
Incumbent Democrat Steven Ultrino is running for re-election. No candidates filed to run in the Republican primary.

Democratic primary
Party	Candidate	Votes	%
Democratic	Steven Ultrino (incumbent)		
Total votes			

=== 34th Middlesex ===
Incumbent Democrat Christine Barber is retiring to run for State Senate. Three candidates filed to run in the Democratic primary. No candidates filed to run in the Republican primary.

==== Democratic primary ====
===== Candidates =====
====== Declared ======
- Will Mbah, vice president of the Somerville City Council
- Chris Oates, data analysis startup founder
- Paul Ruseau, member of the Medford School Committee

====== Declined ======
- Christine Barber, incumbent state representative (2015–present)

Democratic primary
Party	Candidate	Votes	%
Democratic	Will Mbah		
Democratic	Chris Oates		
Democratic	Paul Ruseau		
Total votes			

=== 35th Middlesex ===
Incumbent Democrat Paul Donato is running for re-election and is unopposed in the Democratic primary. Jake Seibel, a resident of Medford, is running unopposed for the Republican nomination.

Democratic primary
Party	Candidate	Votes	%
Democratic	Paul Donato (incumbent)		
Total votes			

Republican primary
Party	Candidate	Votes	%
Republican	Jake Seibel		
Total votes			

=== 36th Middlesex ===
Incumbent Democrat Colleen Garry is running for re-election. No candidates filed to run in the Republican primary.

Democratic primary
Party	Candidate	Votes	%
Democratic	Colleen Garry (incumbent)		
Total votes			

=== 37th Middlesex ===
Incumbent Democrat Danillo Sena is running for re-election. No candidates filed to run in the Republican primary.

Democratic primary
Party	Candidate	Votes	%
Democratic	Danillo Sena (incumbent)		
Total votes			

=== 1st Norfolk ===
Incumbent Democrat Bruce Ayers is running for re-election. No candidates filed to run in the Republican primary.

Democratic primary
Party	Candidate	Votes	%
Democratic	Bruce Ayers (incumbent)		
Total votes			

=== 2nd Norfolk ===
Incumbent Democrat Tackey Chan is running for re-election and is unopposed in the Democratic primary. Sharon Cintolo, the Republican nominee for this seat in 2022 and 2024, is running unopposed for the Republican nomination.

Democratic primary
Party	Candidate	Votes	%
Democratic	Tackey Chan (incumbent)		
Total votes			

Republican primary
Party	Candidate	Votes	%
Republican	Sharon Cintolo		
Total votes			

=== 3rd Norfolk ===
Incumbent Democrat Ron Mariano, the speaker of the House, is running for re-election. No candidates filed to run in the Republican primary.

Democratic primary
Party	Candidate	Votes	%
Democratic	Ron Mariano (incumbent)		
Total votes			

=== 4th Norfolk ===
Incumbent Democrat James M. Murphy is running for re-election. No candidates filed to run in the Republican primary.

Democratic primary
Party	Candidate	Votes	%
Democratic	James M. Murphy (incumbent)		
Total votes			

=== 5th Norfolk ===
Incumbent Democrat Mark Cusack is running for re-election. No candidates filed to run in the Republican primary.

Democratic primary
Party	Candidate	Votes	%
Democratic	Mark Cusack (incumbent)		
Total votes			

=== 6th Norfolk ===
Incumbent Democrat Bill C. Galvin is retiring. Three candidates have qualified for the Democratic primary. No candidates filed to run in the Republican primary.

==== Democratic primary ====
===== Candidates =====
====== Declared ======
- Steve Cavey, Stoughton select board member
- Lisa Lopez, former Canton select board member
- Michael Loughran, Canton select board member

====== Declined ======
- Bill C. Galvin, incumbent state representative (1991–present)

Democratic primary
Party	Candidate	Votes	%
Democratic	Steve Cavey		
Democratic	Lisa Lopez		
Democratic	Michael Loughran		
Total votes			

=== 7th Norfolk ===
Incumbent Democrat Richard Wells is running for re-election and faces Clinton Graham, an unenrolled candidate for this seat in 2024, in the Democratic primary. No candidates filed to run in the Republican primary.

Democratic primary
Party	Candidate	Votes	%
Democratic	Richard Wells (incumbent)		
Democratic	Clinton Graham		
Total votes			

=== 8th Norfolk ===
Incumbent Democrat Ted Philips is running for re-election. No candidates filed to run in the Republican primary.

Democratic primary
Party	Candidate	Votes	%
Democratic	Ted Philips (incumbent)		
Total votes			

=== 9th Norfolk ===
Incumbent Republican Marcus Vaughn is running for re-election and is unopposed in the Republican primary. Tom Melville, a veteran journalist and attorney, is running unopposed for the Democratic nomination.

Republican primary
Party	Candidate	Votes	%
Republican	Marcus Vaughn (incumbent)		
Total votes			

Democratic primary
Party	Candidate	Votes	%
Democratic	Tom Melville		
Total votes			

=== 10th Norfolk ===
Incumbent Democrat Jeffrey Roy is running for re-election. No candidates filed to run in the Republican primary.

Democratic primary
Party	Candidate	Votes	%
Democratic	Jeffrey Roy (incumbent)		
Total votes			

=== 11th Norfolk ===
Incumbent Democrat Paul McMurtry is running for re-election. No candidates filed to run in the Republican primary.

Democratic primary
Party	Candidate	Votes	%
Democratic	Paul McMurtry (incumbent)		
Total votes			

=== 12th Norfolk ===
Incumbent Democrat John H. Rogers is running for re-election. No candidates filed to run in the Republican primary.

Democratic primary
Party	Candidate	Votes	%
Democratic	John H. Rogers (incumbent)		
Total votes			

=== 13th Norfolk ===
Incumbent Democrat Joshua Tarsky is running for re-election. No candidates filed to run in the Republican primary.

Democratic primary
Party	Candidate	Votes	%
Democratic	Joshua Tarsky (incumbent)		
Total votes			

=== 14th Norfolk ===
Incumbent Democrat Alice Peisch is running for re-election. No candidates filed to run in the Republican primary.

Democratic primary
Party	Candidate	Votes	%
Democratic	Alice Peisch (incumbent)		
Total votes			

=== 15th Norfolk ===
Incumbent Democrat Tommy Vitolo is running for re-election. No candidates filed to run in the Republican primary.

Democratic primary
Party	Candidate	Votes	%
Democratic	Tommy Vitolo (incumbent)		
Total votes			

=== 1st Plymouth ===
Incumbent Democrat Michelle Badger is running for re-election and is unopposed in the Democratic primary. David Golden Jr., a member of the Plymouth Select Board, in running unopposed for the Republican nomination.

Democratic primary
Party	Candidate	Votes	%
Democratic	Michelle Badger (incumbent)		
Total votes			

Republican primary
Party	Candidate	Votes	%
Republican	David Golden Jr.		
Total votes			

=== 2nd Plymouth ===
Incumbent Republican John Gaskey is running for re-election and faces Mark Townsend, a member of the Carver Select Board, in the Republican primary. Sarah Hewins, the Democratic nominee for this seat in 2016 and 2018, is running unopposed for the Democratic nomination.

Republican primary
Party	Candidate	Votes	%
Republican	John Gaskey (incumbent)		
Republican	Mark Townsend		
Total votes			

Democratic primary
Party	Candidate	Votes	%
Democratic	Sarah Hewins		
Total votes			

=== 3rd Plymouth ===
Incumbent Democrat Joan Meschino is running for re-election. No candidates filed to run in the Republican primary.

Democratic primary
Party	Candidate	Votes	%
Democratic	Joan Meschino (incumbent)		
Total votes			

=== 4th Plymouth ===
Incumbent Democrat Patrick J. Kearney is running for re-election and faces Katie Baxter, his former legislative aide, in the Democratic primary. No candidates filed to run in the Republican primary.

Democratic primary
Party	Candidate	Votes	%
Democratic	Patrick J. Kearney (incumbent)		
Democratic	Katie Baxter		
Total votes			

=== 5th Plymouth ===
Incumbent Republican David DeCoste is running for re-election and is unopposed in the Republican primary. Lori Childs, a member of the Rockland Select Board, is running unopposed for the Democratic nomination.

Republican primary
Party	Candidate	Votes	%
Republican	David DeCoste (incumbent)		
Total votes			

Democratic primary
Party	Candidate	Votes	%
Democratic	Lori Childs		
Total votes			

=== 6th Plymouth ===
Incumbent Republican Kenneth Sweezey is running for re-election and is unopposed in the Republican primary. Jessica Bradley Rushing, a former chair of the Pembroke Select Board, is running unopposed for the Democratic nomination.

Republican primary
Party	Candidate	Votes	%
Republican	Kenneth Sweezey (incumbent)		
Total votes			

Democratic primary
Party	Candidate	Votes	%
Democratic	Jessica Bradley Rushing		
Total votes			

=== 7th Plymouth ===
Incumbent Republican Alyson Sullivan-Almeida is running for re-election and is unopposed in the Republican primary. Rosemary Aahanna-Hill, a member of the Whitman-Hanson School Committee, is running unopposed for the Democratic nomination.

Republican primary
Party	Candidate	Votes	%
Republican	Alyson Sullivan-Almeida (incumbent)		
Total votes			

Democratic primary
Party	Candidate	Votes	%
Democratic	Rosemary Aahanna-Hill		
Total votes			

==== Endorsements ====
Rosemary Aahanna-Hill

Individuals

- Brandon J. Griffin, activist and candidate for this seat in 2022 (Independent)
- Diane Philips, chair of East Bridgewater Democratic Town Committee

=== 8th Plymouth ===
Incumbent Democrat Dennis Gallagher is running for re-election and is unopposed in the Democratic primary. John Norris, a former member of the Bridgewater Town Council, is running unopposed for the Republican nomination.

Democratic primary
Party	Candidate	Votes	%
Democratic	Dennis Gallagher (incumbent)		
Total votes			

Republican primary
Party	Candidate	Votes	%
Republican	John Norris		
Total votes			

=== 9th Plymouth ===
Incumbent Democrat Bridget Plouffe is running for re-election and is unopposed in the Democratic primary. Larry Novak, the Republican nominee for this seat in 2024, is running unopposed for the Republican nomination.

Democratic primary
Party	Candidate	Votes	%
Democratic	Bridget Plouffe (incumbent)		
Total votes			

Republican primary
Party	Candidate	Votes	%
Republican	Larry Novak		
Total votes			

=== 10th Plymouth ===
Incumbent Democrat Michelle DuBois is running for re-election after fending Tony Rodrigues, a member of the Brockton School Board, off in the Democratic primary. No candidates filed to run in the Republican primary.

Democratic primary
Party	Candidate	Votes	%
Democratic	Michelle DuBois (incumbent)	2,349	77.2
Democratic	Tony Rodrigues	694	22.8
Total votes			

=== 11th Plymouth ===
Incumbent Democrat Rita Mendes is running for re-election. No candidates filed to run in the Republican primary.

Democratic primary
Party	Candidate	Votes	%
Democratic	Rita Mendes (incumbent)		
Total votes			

=== 12th Plymouth ===
Incumbent Democrat Kathleen LaNatra is running for re-election and is unopposed in the Democratic primary. Eric J. Meschino, the Republican nominee for this seat in 2022 and 2024, is running opposed for the Republican nomination.

Democratic primary
Party	Candidate	Votes	%
Democratic	Kathleen LaNatra (incumbent)		
Total votes			

Republican primary
Party	Candidate	Votes	%
Republican	Eric J. Meschino		
Total votes			

=== 1st Suffolk ===
Incumbent Democrat Adrian Madaro is running for re-election. No candidates filed to run in the Republican primary.

Democratic primary
Party	Candidate	Votes	%
Democratic	Adrian Madaro (incumbent)		
Total votes			

=== 2nd Suffolk ===
Incumbent Democrat Daniel Joseph Ryan is running for re-election. No candidates filed to run in the Republican primary.

Democratic primary
Party	Candidate	Votes	%
Democratic	Daniel Joseph Ryan (incumbent)		
Total votes			

=== 3rd Suffolk ===
Incumbent Democrat Aaron Michlewitz is running for re-election. No candidates filed to run in the Republican primary.

Democratic primary
Party	Candidate	Votes	%
Democratic	Aaron Michlewitz (incumbent)		
Total votes			

=== 4th Suffolk ===
Incumbent Democrat David Biele is running for re-election. No candidates filed to run in the Republican primary.

Democratic primary
Party	Candidate	Votes	%
Democratic	David Biele (incumbent)		
Total votes			

=== 5th Suffolk ===
Incumbent Democrat Christopher Worrell is running for re-election. No candidates filed to run in the Republican primary.

Democratic primary
Party	Candidate	Votes	%
Democratic	Christopher Worrell (incumbent)		
Total votes			

=== 6th Suffolk ===
Incumbent Democrat Russell Holmes is running for re-election. No candidates filed to run in the Republican primary.

Democratic primary
Party	Candidate	Votes	%
Democratic	Russell Holmes (incumbent)		
Total votes			

=== 7th Suffolk ===
Incumbent Democrat Chynah Tyler is running for re-election. No candidates filed to run in the Republican primary.

Democratic primary
Party	Candidate	Votes	%
Democratic	Chynah Tyler (incumbent)		
Total votes			

=== 8th Suffolk ===
Incumbent Democrat Jay Livingstone is running for re-election. No candidates filed to run in the Republican primary.

Democratic primary
Party	Candidate	Votes	%
Democratic	Jay Livingstone (incumbent)		
Total votes			

=== 9th Suffolk ===
Incumbent Democrat John F. Moran is running for re-election. No candidates filed to run in the Republican primary.

Democratic primary
Party	Candidate	Votes	%
Democratic	John F. Moran (incumbent)		
Total votes			

=== 10th Suffolk ===
Incumbent Democrat Bill MacGregor is running for re-election. No candidates filed to run in the Republican primary.

Democratic primary
Party	Candidate	Votes	%
Democratic	Bill MacGregor (incumbent)		
Total votes			

=== 11th Suffolk ===
Incumbent Democrat Judith García is running for re-election. No candidates filed to run in the Republican primary.

Democratic primary
Party	Candidate	Votes	%
Democratic	Judith García (incumbent)		
Total votes			

=== 12th Suffolk ===
Incumbent Democrat Brandy Fluker-Reid is running for re-election. No candidates filed to run in the Republican primary.

Democratic primary
Party	Candidate	Votes	%
Democratic	Brandy Fluker-Reid (incumbent)		
Total votes			

=== 13th Suffolk ===
Incumbent Democrat Daniel J. Hunt is running for re-election. No candidates filed to run in the Republican primary.

Democratic primary
Party	Candidate	Votes	%
Democratic	Daniel J. Hunt (incumbent)		
Total votes			

=== 14th Suffolk ===
Incumbent Democrat Robert Consalvo is running for re-election. No candidates filed to run in the Republican primary.

Democratic primary
Party	Candidate	Votes	%
Democratic	Robert Consalvo (incumbent)		
Total votes			

=== 15th Suffolk ===
Incumbent Democrat Sam Montaño is running for re-election and faces Steven Berry in the Democratic primary. No candidates filed to run in the Republican primary.

Democratic primary
Party	Candidate	Votes	%
Democratic	Sam Montaño (incumbent)		
Democratic	Steven Berry		
Total votes			

=== 16th Suffolk ===
Incumbent Democrat Jessica Giannino is running for re-election. No candidates filed to run in the Republican primary.

Democratic primary
Party	Candidate	Votes	%
Democratic	Jessica Giannino (incumbent)		
Total votes			

=== 17th Suffolk ===
Incumbent Democrat Kevin Honan is running for re-election. No candidates filed to run in the Republican primary.

Democratic primary
Party	Candidate	Votes	%
Democratic	Kevin Honan (incumbent)		
Total votes			

=== 18th Suffolk ===
Incumbent Democrat Michael Moran is running for re-election. No candidates filed to run in the Republican primary.

Democratic primary
Party	Candidate	Votes	%
Democratic	Michael Moran (incumbent)		
Total votes			

=== 19th Suffolk ===
Incumbent Democrat Jeffrey Turco is running for re-election and faces LeeAllen Meyer, a paramedic, in the Democratic primary. No candidates filed to run in the Republican primary.

Democratic primary
Party	Candidate	Votes	%
Democratic	Jeffrey Turco (incumbent)		
Democratic	LeeAllen Meyer		
Total votes			

=== 1st Worcester ===
Incumbent Republican Kimberly Ferguson is retiring. Stephanie Mulroy, a former Holden select board member, is running unopposed for the Republican nomination. Krista Ferrante, librarian and archivist, is unopposed in the Democratic primary.

Republican primary
Party	Candidate	Votes	%
Republican	Stephanie Mulroy		
Total votes			

Democratic primary
Party	Candidate	Votes	%
Democratic	Krista Ferrante		
Total votes			

=== 2nd Worcester ===
Incumbent Democrat Jonathan Zlotnik is retiring. Mike Nicholson, mayor of Gardner and former town administrator of Rutland, is running unopposed for the Democratic nomination. Nate Boudreau, former town administrator of Hubbardston and Gardner city councilor, has launched a write-in campaign for the Republican nomination after failing to qualify for the ballot.

Democratic primary
Party	Candidate	Votes	%
Democratic	Mike Nicholson	2,579	100.00%
Total votes		2,579	100.00%

Republican primary
Party	Candidate	Votes	%
Republican	Nate Boudreau (write-in)		
Total votes			

=== 3rd Worcester ===
Incumbent Democrat Mike Kushmerek is running for re-election. No candidates filed to run in the Republican primary.

Democratic primary
Party	Candidate	Votes	%
Democratic	Mike Kushmerek (incumbent)		
Total votes			

=== 4th Worcester ===
Incumbent Democrat Natalie Higgins is running for re-election and is unopposed in the Democratic primary. Josh Bowdridge, a member of the Leominster School Committee, is running unopposed for the Republican nomination.

Democratic primary
Party	Candidate	Votes	%
Democratic	Natalie Higgins (incumbent)		
Total votes			

Republican primary
Party	Candidate	Votes	%
Republican	Josh Bowdridge		
Total votes			

=== 5th Worcester ===
Incumbent Republican Donnie Berthiaume is running for re-election. No candidates filed to run in the Democratic primary.

Republican primary
Party	Candidate	Votes	%
Republican	Donnie Berthiaume (incumbent)		
Total votes			

=== 6th Worcester ===
Incumbent Republican John Marsi is running for re-election and is unopposed in the Republican primary. Jeanne Renaud Costello, the Democratic nominee for this seat in 2024, is running opposed for the Democratic nomination.

Republican primary
Party	Candidate	Votes	%
Republican	John Marsi (incumbent)		
Total votes			

Democratic primary
Party	Candidate	Votes	%
Democratic	Jeanne Renaud Costello		
Total votes			

=== 7th Worcester ===
Incumbent Republican Paul Frost is running for re-election and is unopposed in the Republican primary. Nicholas Lazzaro, a member of the Millbury Select Board, is running unopposed for the Democratic nomination.

Republican primary
Party	Candidate	Votes	%
Republican	Paul Frost (incumbent)		
Total votes			

Democratic primary
Party	Candidate	Votes	%
Democratic	Nicholas Lazzaro		
Total votes			

=== 8th Worcester ===
Incumbent Republican Michael Soter is running for re-election. No candidates filed to run in the Republican primary.

Republican primary
Party	Candidate	Votes	%
Republican	Michael Soter (incumbent)		
Total votes			

=== 9th Worcester ===
Incumbent Republican David Muradian is running for re-election. No candidates filed to run in the Republican primary.

Republican primary
Party	Candidate	Votes	%
Republican	David Muradian (incumbent)		
Total votes			

=== 10th Worcester ===
Incumbent Democrat Brian Murray is running for re-election. No candidates filed to run in the Republican primary.

Democratic primary
Party	Candidate	Votes	%
Democratic	Brian Murray (incumbent)		
Total votes			

=== 11th Worcester ===
Incumbent Republican Hannah Kane is running for re-election. No candidates filed to run in the Republican primary.

Republican primary
Party	Candidate	Votes	%
Republican	Hannah Kane (incumbent)		
Total votes			

=== 12th Worcester ===
Incumbent Democrat Meghan Kilcoyne is running for re-election and is unopposed in the Democratic primary. Lisa Mair, a member of the Berlin-Boylston Regional School Committee, is running unopposed for the Republican nomination.

Democratic primary
Party	Candidate	Votes	%
Democratic	Meghan Kilcoyne (incumbent)		
Total votes			

Republican primary
Party	Candidate	Votes	%
Republican	Lisa Mair		
Total votes			

=== 13th Worcester ===
Incumbent Democrat John J. Mahoney is running for re-election. No candidates filed to run in the Republican primary.

Democratic primary
Party	Candidate	Votes	%
Democratic	John J. Mahoney (incumbent)		
Total votes			

=== 14th Worcester ===
Incumbent Democrat Jim O'Day is running for re-election and faces Barur 'Raj' Rajeshkumar, a West Boylston selectman, in the Democratic primary. No candidates filed to run in the Republican primary.

Democratic primary
Party	Candidate	Votes	%
Democratic	Jim O'Day (incumbent)		
Democratic	Barur 'Raj' Rajeshkumar		
Total votes			

=== 15th Worcester ===
Incumbent Democrat Mary Keefe is running for re-election and faces Ron Waddell, a nonprofit leader, in the Democratic primary. No candidates filed to run in the Republican primary.

Democratic primary
Party	Candidate	Votes	%
Democratic	Mary Keefe (incumbent)		
Democratic	Ron Waddell		
Total votes			

=== 16th Worcester ===
Incumbent Democrat Dan Donahue is running for re-election. No candidates filed to run in the Republican primary.

Democratic primary
Party	Candidate	Votes	%
Democratic	Dan Donahue (incumbent)		
Total votes			

=== 17th Worcester ===
Incumbent Democrat David LeBoeuf is running for re-election. No candidates filed to run in the Republican primary.

Democratic primary
Party	Candidate	Votes	%
Democratic	David LeBoeuf (incumbent)		
Total votes			

=== 18th Worcester ===
Incumbent Republican Joseph D. McKenna is running for re-election and is unopposed in the Republican primary. Jen Heck, a documentary filmmaker, is running unopposed for the Democratic nomination.

Republican primary
Party	Candidate	Votes	%
Republican	David Muradian (incumbent)		
Total votes			

Democratic primary
Party	Candidate	Votes	%
Democratic	Jen Heck		
Total votes			

=== 19th Worcester ===
Incumbent Democrat Kate Donaghue is running for re-election. No candidates filed to run in the Republican primary.

Democratic primary
Party	Candidate	Votes	%
Democratic	Kate Donaghue (incumbent)		
Total votes			

== See also ==
- 2027-28 Massachusetts legislature
- 2026 United States elections
- 2026 United States Senate election in Massachusetts
- 2026 United States House of Representatives elections in Massachusetts
- 2026 Massachusetts gubernatorial election
- 2026 Massachusetts Attorney General election
- 2026 Massachusetts Treasurer and Receiver-General election
- 2026 Massachusetts State Auditor election
- 2026 Massachusetts Senate election
- 2023-24 Massachusetts legislature
- 2025-26 Massachusetts legislature
