= Ben Ewen-Campen =

American politician

Member-elect of the Massachusetts House of Representatives from the 27th Middlesex district
- Assuming office January 2027
- Succeeding: Erika Uyterhoeven

Personal details
- Party: Democratic
- Education: Swarthmore College; Harvard University
- Scientific career
- Workplaces: Harvard University
- Thesis: An evolutionary perspective on germ cell specification genes in insects (2014)
- Doctoral advisor: Cassandra Extavour

Benjamin Scott Ewen-Campen is an American evolutionary biologist and politician. A former member of Somerville City Council, he is the Democratic member-elect of the Massachusetts House of Representatives from the 27th Middlesex district. He is also a research associate at Norbert Perrimon's laboratory in Harvard Medical School.

== Biography ==
=== Early life and academic career ===
Ewen-Campen was born in Cambridge, Massachusetts, son of economist Jim Campen and artist Phyllis Ewen. He is a first cousin once removed of Dean Jamison and Kay Redfield Jamison. After graduating from Cambridge Rindge and Latin School in 2001, he obtained his bachelor's degree in biology from Swarthmore College in 2006.

Ewen-Campen worked at the University of Montana as a research assistant (2006–2007) and studied at the Marine Biological Laboratory's 2007 embryology summer course. He obtained his PhD in organismic and evolutionary biology from Harvard University in 2014; his doctoral dissertation An evolutionary perspective on germ cell specification genes in insects was supervised by Cassandra Extavour. That same year, he became a research fellow at Harvard Medical School, specifically at Norbert Perrimon's genetic laboratory. In 2018, he won Harvard Medical School's Outstanding Postdoc Fellow Award.

As an academic, Ewen-Campen specializes in evolutionary developmental biology. His academic research involves genetic manipulation and germline stem cells.

=== Political career ===
Ewen-Campen launched a bid for one of Somerville City Council's seats in response to Donald Trump's victory in the 2016 United States presidential election, which he called "a radicalizing experience. People started getting together. We said, 'We may not be able to influence things on a national scale, but let’s see what’s going on at the state and local levels.'" He won election to the council for the first time in 2017. As of 2021, he was one of only two Democratic Socialists of America members on the council. He was also president of the council twice.

Ewen-Campen introduced a resolution calling for a ceasefire in the Gaza war, the first of its kind in Massachusetts; the City Council passed it 9-2 on January 25, 2024. In June 2026, he co-introduced a resolution banning the awarding of municipal contracts to companies involved in either violations of international humanitarian law or in business with countries committing "apartheid, genocide or unlawful military occupation", specifically naming such crimes in the territory of Israel and Palestine. Ewen-Campen stated this was because a November 2025 municipal ballot question on the issue had passed. After a brief delay on action to look into what would be covered by the resolution, the City Council approved the resolution 10-1, with the mayoral office calling the decision final due to the veto-proof majority.

Ewen-Campen endorsed Shannon Liss-Riordan in the 2022 Massachusetts Attorney General election.

Ewen-Campen ran in the 2026 Massachusetts House of Representatives election from the 27th Middlesex district. His campaign was endorsed by several labor unions and progressive organizations, including the state AFL-CIO and Planned Parenthood Advocacy Fund. He won the September 2026 Democratic primary, defeating Olivia Gilligan-Corsetti 69.9% to 30.1%. After winning the primary, he announced that he would resign from the Council on December 31. With no other challengers, let alone a Republican one, he won the November general election automatically.

Ewen-Campen is Jewish.
