= Tara Hong =

American politician

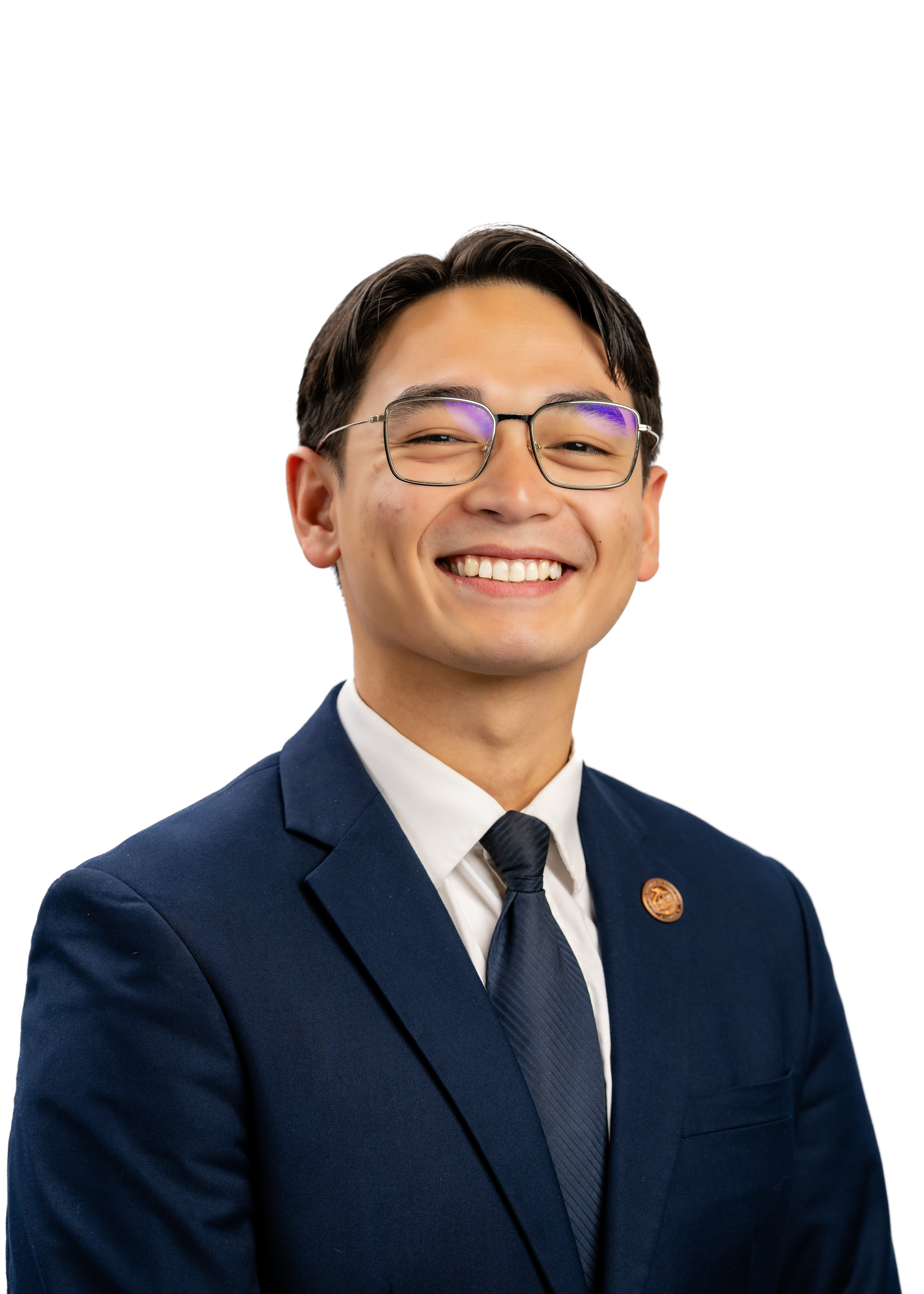
- Hong in 2024

Member of the Massachusetts House of Representatives from the 18th Middlesex district
- Incumbent
- Assumed office January 1, 2025
- Preceded by: Rady Mom

Personal details
- Born: 2000 (age 25–26) Cambodia
- Party: Democratic
- Education: University of Massachusetts Lowell (BA)
- Website: Campaign website

Tara Thorn Hong (born 2000) is a Cambodian-born American politician serving as a member of the Massachusetts House of Representatives from the 18th Middlesex district. He was elected in the 2024 election, defeating incumbent Rady Mom in the Democratic primary in a rematch of the 2022 election.

== Early life and education ==
Hong was born in Cambodia and emigrated to Lowell, Massachusetts, with his mother and sister at 13-years old in 2013. He graduated from the University of Massachusetts Lowell in 2022 with a Bachelor of Arts.

== Massachusetts House of Representatives ==
In 2022, Hong ran for the 18th Middlesex district of the Massachusetts House of Representatives. He placed second in the Democratic primary election, trailing incumbent Rady Mom by 68 votes.

Hong challenged Mom again in 2024, defeating him in the Democratic primary election with 47% to Mom's 40% of the vote.

In 2026, Hong defeated former Lowell mayor Sokhary Chau in the Democratic primary election.
