= Wondolowski =

Wondolowski may refer to:

- Bill Wondolowski (b. 1946), American football player
- Chris Wondolowski (b. 1983), American soccer player
- Lora Wondolowski (b. 1969), American biologist and politician
