= Lorena Betts =

Member-elect of the Massachusetts House of Representatives from the 16th Middlesex district
- Assuming office January 6, 2027
- Succeeding: Rodney Elliott

Personal details
- Born: Comodoro, Mato Grosso, Brazil
- Party: Democratic
- Children: 3
- Education: Southern New Hampshire University
- Occupation: Nurse; Interpreter; Translator
- Website: Campaign website

Lorena Betts is a Brazilian nurse and politician who lives in the United States and is a member of the Democratic Party. In the 2026 elections, she was elected to represent the 16th Middlesex District in the Massachusetts House of Representatives.

== Biography ==
Lorena was born in Comodoro, a city located in the interior of the state of Mato Grosso, in Brazil. She earned a degree in nursing and began working as a nurse in the city of Holambra, in the interior of the state of São Paulo. She immigrated to the United States in 2011 after seeing an ad for a nanny position through the Au Pair program. In an interview with the G1 website, which is part of the Grupo Globo, Betts stated, “I participated in the au pair exchange program, which was a way for me to come to the United States legally to learn English and become fluent, since I was very interested in becoming bilingual.” She also told G1 that her nursing degree, earned in Brazil, was not recognized in the United States. She decided to change fields, earning a degree in political science from Southern New Hampshire University (SNHU), and began working as a legal interpreter and translator in the field of U.S. immigration.

As a representative of the Democratic Party, she was the party's candidate for the 16th Middlesex district in 2026 elections. As part of her campaign platform, she advocated for the revitalization of the Beacon Hill neighborhood in Boston and for fewer federal cuts to the U.S. public health system. His campaign received support from Senator Jamie Eldridge and the civic organization Working Families Party. With nearly 8,000 votes, she was elected, defeating Karla Miller, the Republican Party candidate.

Electoral performance

Year	Election	District	Votes	Result	Ref.
2026	Massachusetts House of Representatives election	16th	7 933	Elected	

== Personal life ==
Lorena is married and has three children.
