= Plouffe =

Plouffe is a French surname. People with the surname include:

- Bridget Plouffe, American politician
- David Plouffe (born 1967), American campaign manager
- Katherine and Michelle Plouffe (born 1992), Canadian basketball players and twin sisters
- Maeve Plouffe (born 1999), Australian cyclist
- Simon Plouffe (born 1956), Canadian mathematician
- Simon Plouffe (filmmaker), Canadian documentary filmmaker
- Steve Plouffe (born 1975), Canadian retired ice hockey goaltender
- Trevor Plouffe (born 1986), American baseball player
- La Famille Plouffe, Quebec TV series of the 1950s (and revived in the 1980s)
- The Plouffe Family (film) (French: Les Plouffe), 1981 Canadian drama film

== See also ==
- Bailey–Borwein–Plouffe formula, a formula for computing π
- The Crime of Ovide Plouffe (French: Le Crime d'Ovide Plouffe), Canadian film and television miniseries from Quebec
- L'Abord-à-Plouffe, Quebec (L'Abord-à-Plouffe) in the southwest of the city of Laval
- Pouf
