= Sweezey =

Sweezey is a surname. Notable people with the surname include:

- Billy Sweezey (born 1996), American ice hockey defenceman
- Kenneth Sweezey, American politician
