= Denise Provost =

American politician

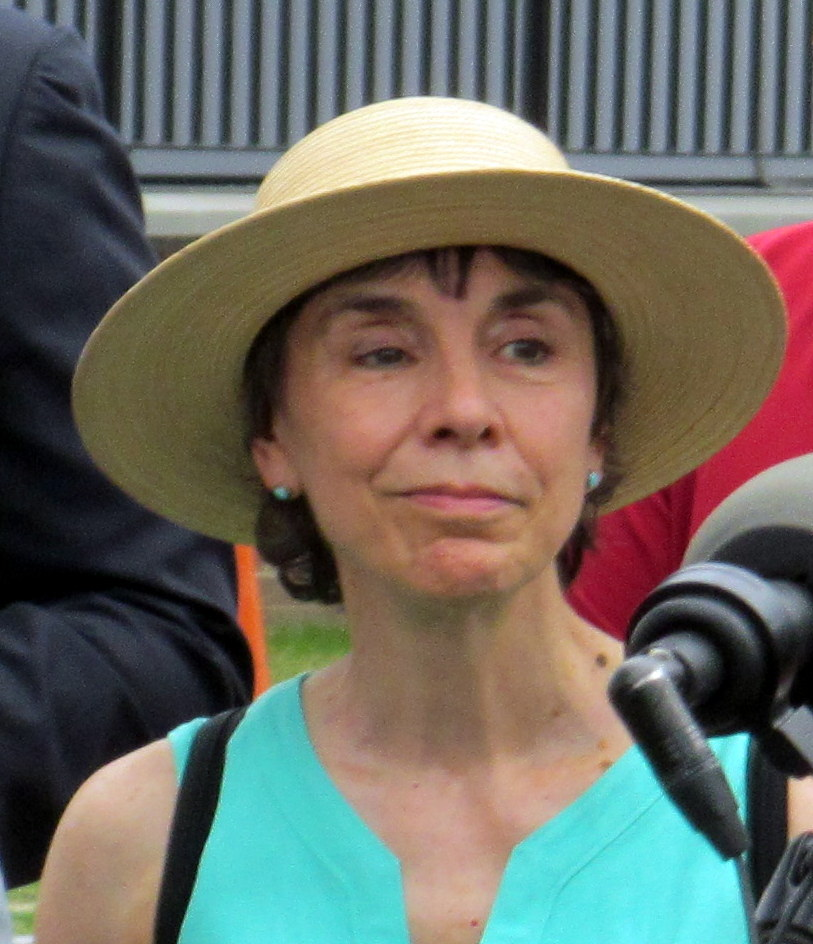
- Provost at the opening of Assembly station in 2014

Member of the Massachusetts House of Representatives from the 27th Middlesex District
- In office 2006–2021
- Preceded by: Patricia D. Jehlen
- Succeeded by: Erika Uyterhoeven

Personal details
- Born: March 9, 1951 (age 75) Lewiston, Maine
- Party: Democratic
- Spouse: Geoffrey Forrest
- Education: Bennington College; Boston University School of Law
- Occupation: Lawyer; Politician

Denise Provost (born March 9, 1951, in Lewiston, Maine) is an American politician who represented the 27th Middlesex District in the Massachusetts House of Representatives from 2006 until 2020 and was a member of the Somerville, Massachusetts Board of Aldermen from 2000 to 2006.

In the 2014 Massachusetts gubernatorial election, Provost endorsed Don Berwick for Governor of Massachusetts.

== See also ==
- 2019–2020 Massachusetts legislature
