= Andrew Tarr =

American politician

Member of the Massachusetts House of Representatives from the 5th Essex district
- Incumbent
- Assumed office April 15, 2026
- Preceded by: Ann-Margaret Ferrante

Personal details
- Party: Democratic
- Website: Campaign website
- Nickname: Dru Tarr

Andrew Francis Robert "Dru" Tarr is an American politician and former legislative aide from Gloucester, Massachusetts. A member of the Democratic Party, he has served in the Massachusetts House of Representatives representing the 5th Essex district since winning a special election in 2026. The election was called following the death of the incumbent, Ann-Margaret Ferrante, for whom Tarr previously worked as a research and district director.

== Electoral history ==
=== 2026 Special Election ===
After the death of the previous representative, Ann-Margaret Ferrante, Tarr ran in a special election to succeed her. He won the primary and the general election.

Special Democratic Primary
Party	Candidate	Votes	%
Democratic	Andrew Tarr	2,194	70.71%
Democratic	Sarah Wilkinson (write-in)	879	28.33%
Write-in		30	0.97%
Total votes		3,103	100.00%

Special General Election
Party	Candidate	Votes	%
Democratic	Andrew Tarr	3,513	63.80%
Republican	Christina Delisio	1,589	28.86%
Independent	Gilbert Frieden	377	6.85%
Write-in		27	0.49%
Total votes		5,506	100.00%
Democratic hold			

=== 2026 ===
After winning the special election, Tarr was challenged in the regular election in the Democratic primary by former Rockport Select Board chair Sarah Wilkinson, who had previously run a write-in campaign during the special Democratic primary. Tarr defeated Wilkinson for the nomination.

Democratic Primary
Party	Candidate	Votes	%
Democratic	Andrew Tarr	5,451	57.90%
Democratic	Sarah Wilkinson	879	41.95%
Write-in		14	0.15%
Total votes		9,415	100.00%

== See also ==
- 2025–2026 Massachusetts legislature
- 2026 United States state legislative elections
- 2026 Massachusetts House of Representatives election
