= Rady Mom =

American politician (born 1970)

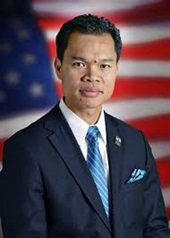

Member of the Massachusetts House of Representatives from the 18th Middlesex district
- In office January 7, 2015 – January 1, 2025
- Preceded by: Kevin Murphy
- Succeeded by: Tara Hong

Personal details
- Born: July 7, 1970 (age 56) Pailin Province, Cambodia
- Party: Democratic
- Spouse: Sirady Van
- Children: Justin, Joee, Amelia and Allyanna
- Education: Middlesex Community College
- Occupation: Buddhist monk, acupressure therapist

Rady Mom (born 1970) is an American politician and a former representative of the Massachusetts House of Representatives, representing the 18th Middlesex district. The district was formerly represented by Kevin Murphy, who vacated his seat in 2014 when he was hired as the city manager of Lowell. Mom is the first Cambodian-American to be elected to the Massachusetts state Legislature as well as the first Cambodian American elected to a state legislature in the country.

== Early life and education ==
Born in Pailin, Cambodia in 1970, the son of a ruby miner. When he was 10, his family was sent to a refugee camp by the Khmer Rouge. According to Mom, his entire family was on a list to be executed. Rady and his family emigrated to America in 1982, when he was 12, sponsored by the Chester Park United Methodist Church in Duluth, Minnesota. In 1984 they moved to Lowell, Massachusetts. Mom became an American Citizen in 1990. He attended Middlesex Community College. Rady, an acupressure therapist, owns Mom's Therapy & Herbal Center in Lowell, MA. Before going to college he became a Buddhist Monk. His grandfather was the high priest at the Lowell Glory Buddhist Temple. He is married to Sirady. They have four children: Justin, Joee, Amelia and Allyanna.

Mom is a graduate of Middlesex Community College and in 2015 received the Distinguished Alumni Award at commencement. In 2005 he ran and lost the race for Lowell City Council.

== Elections ==
=== 2014 ===
Mom defeated independent Fred Bahou in the 2014 Massachusetts general election with 3,847 votes, 61.7% of the vote. His election made him the first new state representative for Lowell in 15 years.

=== 2016 ===
The 2016 election marked the first time three Cambodian-American candidates faced off for a state legislature position. Mom ran against Republican Kamara Kay, in the general election, and Cheth Khim, in the Democratic Primary in a bid to keep his seat in the Massachusetts House. Mom faced heavy opposition, with a large part of the local Cambodian-American constituency disliking Mom's association with Hun Manet, who visited Lowell in May, 2016. Mom won the primary election with 51% of the vote and went on to be reelected by a landslide victory over Kay.

=== 2018 ===
Mom ran largely unopposed in the 2018 Massachusetts general election with 5,8742 votes, 92% of the vote.

== Political career ==
In December 2023 Mom filed "An act relative to instruction on the Cambodian and Vietnamese American refugee experience, Cambodian genocide and the history and culture of the Hmong people" Bill HD.4752.

=== Committee assignments ===
- Joint Committee on Education
- Joint Committee on Election Laws
- Joint Committee on Public Safety and Homeland Security
- Joint Committee on Telecommunications, Utilities and Energy

== See also ==
- 2019–2020 Massachusetts legislature
- 2021–2022 Massachusetts legislature
