= Gerard Cassidy =

American politician

Gerry Cassidy
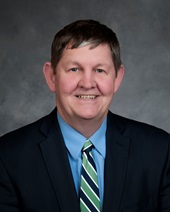

Member of the Massachusetts House of Representatives from the 9th Plymouth district
- In office 2016–2025
- Preceded by: Michael Brady
- Succeeded by: Bridget Plouffe

Personal details
- Born: Gerard Cassidy Brockton, Massachusetts, U.S.
- Party: Democratic

Gerard "Gerry" J. Cassidy is an American politician and former political advisor who was a member of the Massachusetts House of Representatives from the 9th Plymouth District.

== Background ==
Cassidy is a native of Brockton, Massachusetts, where he attended Brockton High School. From 28 years, Cassidy served as a legislative aide to Thomas P. Kennedy. From 2000 to 2003, Cassidy served as a member of the Brockton City Council. In 2015, he was elected to the Massachusetts House of Representatives, succeeding Michael Brady, who was elected to the Massachusetts Senate. He assumed office in 2016. Cassidy is a member of the Democratic Party.
