= William M. Straus =

American politician

Bill Straus
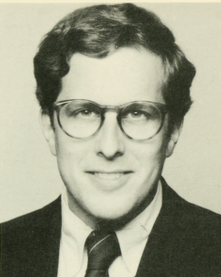
- Straus in 1995

Member of the Massachusetts House of Representatives from the 10th Bristol district
- In office January 6, 1993 – January 1, 2025
- Preceded by: John C. Bradford
- Succeeded by: Mark Sylvia

Personal details
- Born: June 26, 1956 (age 70) East Orange, New Jersey
- Party: Democratic
- Education: Middlebury College; Georgetown University; Harvard University
- Occupation: Attorney

William M. Straus (born June 26, 1956, in East Orange, New Jersey) is an American politician. He was a member of the Massachusetts House of Representatives from 1993 through 2024 choosing not to run for re-election in 2024. He represented the 10th Bristol District comprising the towns of Fairhaven; New Bedford: Ward 3: Precinct A, Ward 4: Precincts D, E; Marion; Mattapoisett; and Rochester.

== Education and early career ==
Representative Straus received his B.A. degree from Middlebury College in 1978 and his J.D. degree from the Georgetown University Law Center in 1982. He received a master's degree in Public Administration from the Kennedy School of Government at Harvard University. From 1978 to 1981 he worked for former U.S. Senator John Culver (D-Iowa). From 1982 to 1988 he was an Assistant District Attorney in Bristol County, Massachusetts. He later served as a member of the Massachusetts Hazardous Waste Facilities Site Safety Council and the Mattapoisett Conservation Commission.

== State representative ==
Representative Straus served as the Chairman of the Joint Committee on Transportation. From 2009 through 2010, Representative Straus served as the Chairman of the Joint Committee on Environment and Agriculture. During the 2005–2006 term of the Massachusetts Legislature he was a member of the Joint Committees on the Environment, Consumer Protection and Bonding-Capital Expenditures. In prior sessions of the Legislature he has served as Vice Chairman of the Transportation Committee and as Chairman of the Committee on Election Laws.

Straus was very involved in the South Coast Rail project through his work on the Joint Committee on Transportation. He has also filed legislation to make public the MBTA pension system finances. Representative Straus also voted in favor of the 2011 law that authorized casino gambling in Massachusetts.

== Personal life ==
He is Jewish.

== See also ==
- 2019–2020 Massachusetts legislature
- 2021–2022 Massachusetts legislature
