= Paul Schmid =

American politician

Member of the Massachusetts House of Representatives from the 8th Bristol district
- In office January 5, 2011 – January 1, 2025
- Preceded by: Michael Rodrigues
- Succeeded by: Steven Ouellette

Personal details
- Born: 1943 (age 82–83)
- Party: Democratic
- Spouse: Christine
- Children: 1 son, 1 daughter
- Education: Harvard College; Harvard University
- Occupation: Businessman, farmer

Paul A. Schmid III has served in the Massachusetts House of Representatives from the 8th Bristol district since 2011. In the 189th session (2015–2016), he assumed a leadership position as the Chairperson, Joint Committee on Environment, Natural Resources and Agriculture, a committee he joined in 2011.

He was previously a member of the board of selectmen in the town of Westport from 2009 to 2011. Prior to that, he served on the finance committee for five years, serving as chair for three years.

His family operates River Rock Farm in South Westport, which raises grass-fed Angus beef cattle. The farm has been certified organic for four years.

He served in the U.S. Marine Corps with the rank of sergeant.

== See also ==
- 2019–2020 Massachusetts legislature
- 2021–2022 Massachusetts legislature
