= Parisella =

Parisella is a surname. Notable people with the surname include:

- Jerry Parisella, American politician from Massachusetts
- John Parisella (1944-2026), American horse trainer
