= Patrick O. Murphy =

American politician

Patrick Ó. Murphy
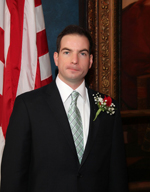

87th Mayor of Lowell, Massachusetts
- In office January 3, 2012 – January 6, 2014
- Preceded by: James L. Milinazzo
- Succeeded by: Rodney Elliott

Member of the Lowell City Council
- In office January 2010 – January 2014

Personal details
- Born: May 10, 1982 (age 44) Lowell, Massachusetts, U.S.
- Party: Democratic
- Spouse: Allegra Williams
- Children: 1
- Education: Phillips Academy; American University; Trinity College, Dublin; Tufts University
- Profession: brick and stonemason

Patrick Óisin Murphy (born May 10, 1982) is an American politician, a former city councillor and formerly a Mayor of Lowell, Massachusetts.

== Personal life ==
Murphy is a resident of the Sacred Heart neighborhood, and a fifth-generation Lowell resident. The youngest son of longtime Lowell teachers Joan and Dan Murphy, Patrick was born eight minutes behind his twin brother Daniel and four years after his sister Gráinne. Like his brother and sister, Patrick graduated from Phillips Academy in Andover on a four-year scholarship, and has continued his education at Tufts University. He works throughout the Merrimack Valley as an independent brick- and stonemason with his cousin.

== Running for Congress ==
- See Massachusetts's 5th congressional district special election, 2007

On June 2, 2007, Murphy announced he was running as an independent in the special election to fill the seat formerly held by Marty Meehan, who resigned to take the position of Chancellor at UMass Lowell. On October 16, 2007, Murphy placed third out of five candidates, receiving 2,170 votes or 2.05%, finishing behind the major party nominees, Democrat Niki Tsongas and Republican Jim Ogonowski.

== Lowell City Council ==
On July 1, 2009, Murphy returned to politics, announcing his first candidacy for the Lowell City Council. As in his Congressional run, Murphy promised not to raise campaign money and suggested that anyone wishing to donate to his campaign could contribute instead to one of many local organizations that could be found on his website. In November 2009, Murphy placed eighth among the twenty-one candidates vying for nine seats.

=== Mayor of Lowell ===
In 2011, Murphy ran for reelection. He finished fourth of seventeen candidates, earning another term on the Lowell City Council. On January 3, 2012, the City Council voted 5 to 4 to name Murphy Mayor of Lowell. At 29, he was youngest Mayor in Lowell history.

=== Legislative accomplishments ===
Murphy introduced a motion requesting that the city look into implementing a variant of the data-tracking and management tool CitiStat. The motion was approved unanimously. The LowellSTAT program was implemented in 2010. As of June 30, 2013 the program has achieved a net savings of $1,393,363.51.

Murphy championed the push for Lowell to become more environmentally friendly. On May 25, 2010, Governor Deval Patrick announced that Lowell would become one of the state's 35 "Green Communities", which made the city eligible for clean-energy grants and additional federal funds.

In 2010, Murphy introduced a motion that expanded the eligibility requirements for the city's homebuyer program to allow veterans who are not first-time homebuyers to receive assistance purchasing a home. City officials expanded the program in July 2011 for fiscal year 2012.

Murphy also started an initiative to erect new bus shelters across the city, urged the City Manager to launch a prescription-drug discount program for Lowell residents, and requested that the city invest more of its money in local banks.

=== Controversies ===
During the 2013 Lowell St. Patrick's Day breakfast, Murphy was criticized for making jokes about his colleagues that were considered to be "too personal". He also upset leaders of the city's Greek community by using a bust of Pericles as a prop during his performance.

On March 26, 2013, City Councilor Rita Mercier announced that she planned to file a motion of no confidence against Murphy. According to City Councilor Rodney Elliott, Murphy's removal was sought because she felt that his attitude towards the other councilors was antagonistic and questioned his commitment to serve. On April 2, 2013, in the face of public support for Murphy by over a dozen registered speakers, the council voted 8 to 0 on a compromise proposal that tasked Murphy with meeting with the city's Greek community to apologize for his actions instead of pursuing the no-confidence vote.

Political offices
Preceded by James L. Milinazzo	Mayor of Lowell; January 3, 2012—January 6, 2014	Succeeded by Rodney Elliott
