= Patricia Haddad =

American politician

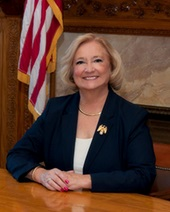

Speaker pro tempore of the Massachusetts House of Representatives
- In office January 28, 2011 – December 30, 2020
- Leader: Robert DeLeo
- Preceded by: Thomas Petrolati
- Succeeded by: Kate Hogan

Member of the Massachusetts House of Representatives from the 5th Bristol district
- In office 2000–2025
- Preceded by: Joan Menard
- Succeeded by: Justin Thurber

Personal details
- Born: May 7, 1950 (age 76) Fall River, Massachusetts, U.S.
- Party: Democratic
- Spouse: Sam Haddad
- Children: 2
- Education: Bridgewater State University (BS)

Patricia A. Haddad (born May 7, 1950 in Fall River, Massachusetts) is an American politician who represented the 5th Bristol district in the Massachusetts House of Representatives from 2000-2025, and formerly served as Speaker pro Tempore of the House.

Prior to serving in the General Court, Haddad spent 14 years as a teacher in Somerset, Massachusetts and was a member of that town's school committee from 1993 to 2001. In 2024, Haddad was defeated by Justin Thurber.

== See also ==
- 2019–2020 Massachusetts legislature
- 2021–2022 Massachusetts legislature

Massachusetts House of Representatives
Preceded by Thomas Petrolati	Speaker pro tempore of the Massachusetts House of Representatives; 2011–2020	Succeeded by Kate Hogan
