= Aaron Saunders =

American politician

Member of the Massachusetts House of Representatives from the 7th Hampden district
- Incumbent
- Assumed office January 4, 2023
- Preceded by: Jacob Oliveira

Personal details
- Born: Ludlow, Massachusetts, U.S.
- Party: Democratic
- Website: Official website

Aaron L. Saunders is an American politician who has served as a member of the Massachusetts House of Representatives from the 7th Hampden district since 2023. He is a member of the Democratic Party.
