= Christopher Worrell (politician) =

American politician

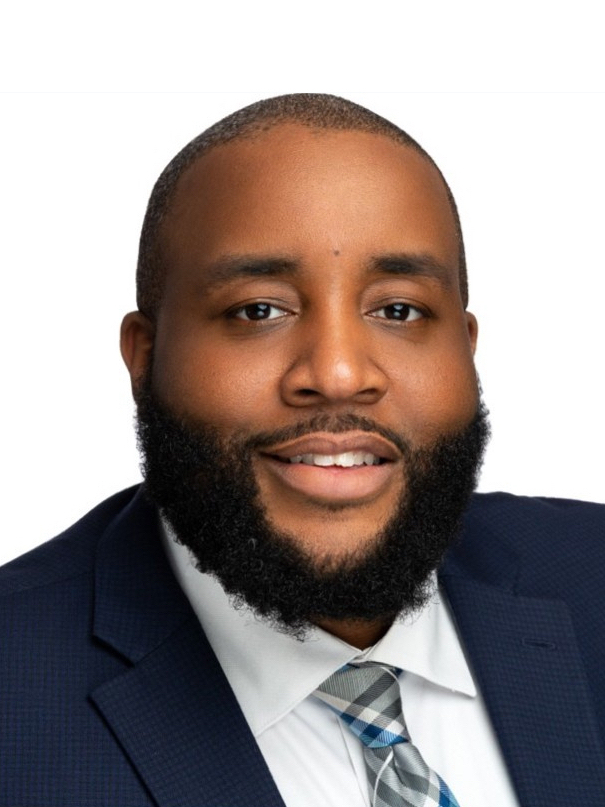
- Official portrait, 2023

Member of the Massachusetts House of Representatives from the 5th Suffolk district
- Incumbent
- Assumed office January 4, 2023
- Preceded by: Liz Miranda (redistricted)

Personal details
- Born: 1985 or 1986 (age 40–41) Dorchester, Boston, Massachusetts, US
- Relatives: Brian Worrell (brother)
- Education: Bunker Hill Community College
- Website: Government webpage; Campaign website

Christopher Worrell (born 1985/86) is an American state politician from Boston, Massachusetts. He represents the 5th Suffolk district in the Massachusetts House of Representatives.

== Early life and education ==
Worrell grew up with his brother, Brian Worrell, on Hewins Street in Dorchester. His parents had moved to Boston from the Caribbean, hailing from Jamaica and Barbados. In his youth, he participated in METCO, a voluntary school desegregation program in Boston, and graduated from Lincoln-Sudbury Regional High School in Sudbury, MA in 2004. He then attended and graduated from Bunker Hill Community College in Charlestown.

Worrell is the brother of Brian Worrell, a member of the Boston City Council.

== Political career ==
In September 2022, Worrell won the Democratic Party primary election. The Boston Globe endorsed Worrell for the state house election.

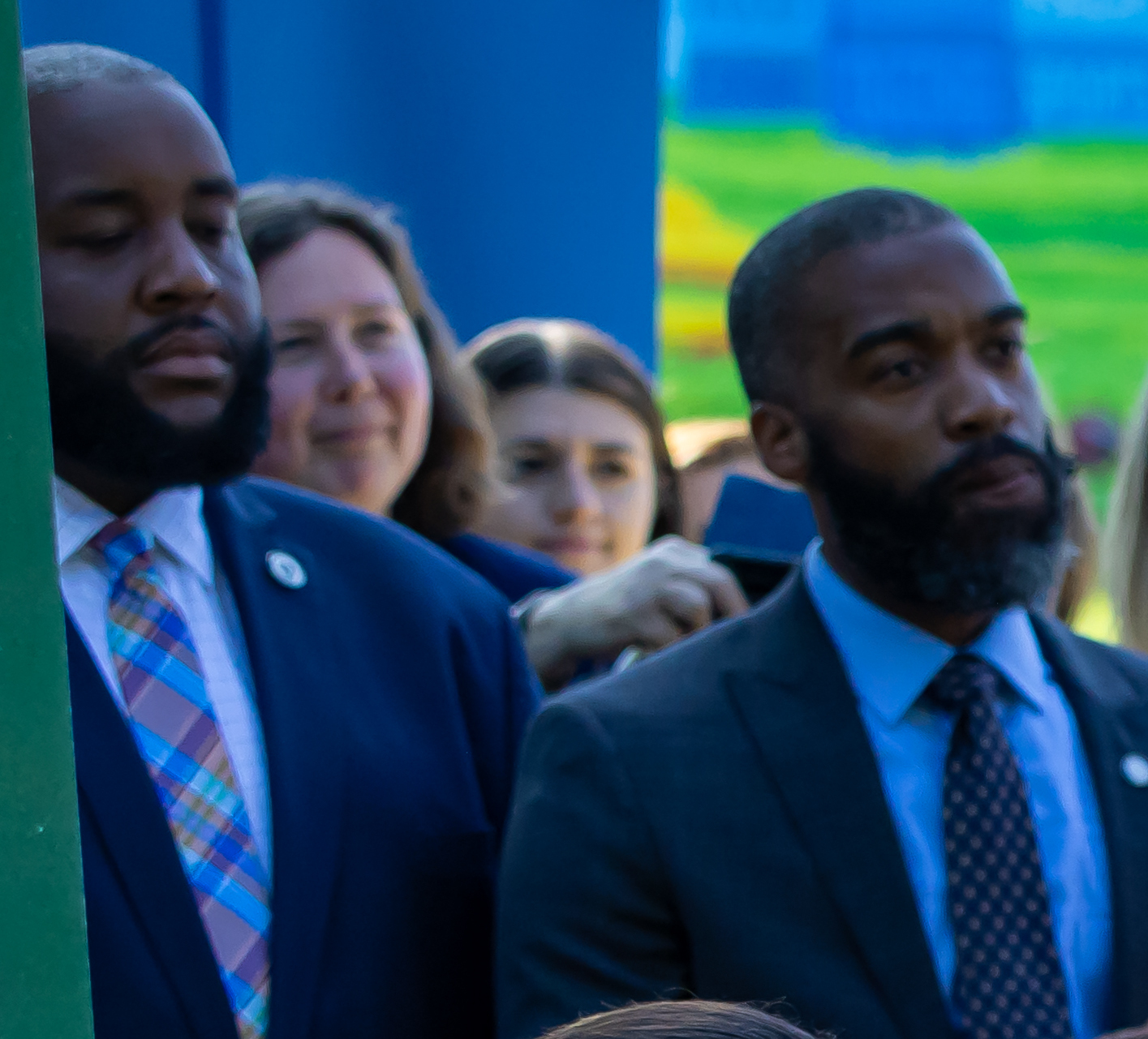
Worrell (left) with his brother Brian (right) in 2023. Boston Housing Authority Administrator Kenzie Bok is visible behind them.

On March 18, 2023, he and his brother Brian (who is a member of the Boston City Council) opened an office together at 5 Erie Street in Dorchester to provide community support. The office's opening ceremony was attended by several local politicians.

Worrell and his brother have supported a bill to reform Boston's liquor license system.

Worrell with Congresswoman Ayanna Pressley in 2024

Worrell was a delegate to the 2024 Democratic National Convention. Prior to President Biden's withdrawal from the presidential election, Worrell was only Massachusetts delegate to the convention that had not yet pledged to vote for Biden in the convention roll call. The day after Biden’s withdrawal, Worrell gave his support to the candidacy of vice president Kamala Harris.

== Personal life ==
Worrell, lives with his wife, Suzette, and three kids, named Carter, Savannah and Simone.

== See also ==
- 2023–2024 Massachusetts legislature#Members
