= Jesse St. Gelais =

American politician

Member-elect of the Massachusetts House of Representatives from the 8th Bristol district
- Assuming office January 2027
- Succeeding: Steven Ouellette

Personal details
- Party: Republican

Jesse St. Gelais is an American politician. A member of the Republican Party, he is the member-elect for the 8th Bristol district of the Massachusetts House of Representatives.
