= Greg Schwartz =

American politician

Member of the Massachusetts House of Representatives from the 12th Middlesex district
- Incumbent
- Assumed office January 4, 2025

Personal details
- Party: Democratic
- Education: Harvard College; Yale Medical School; Yale Law School
- Website: www.teamschwartz.org

Greg Schwartz is an American politician. He serves as a Democratic member for the 12th Middlesex district of the Massachusetts House of Representatives since 2025.
