= Kate Donaghue =

American politician

Member of the Massachusetts House of Representatives from the 19th Worcester district
- Incumbent
- Assumed office January 4, 2023
- Preceded by: Constituency established

Personal details
- Party: Democratic
- Spouse(s): Kimball Simpson (died 2021)
- Children: 2 (Note: One stepchild.)
- Education: Northeastern University (MS); Worcester Polytechnic Institute (MS)

Kate Donaghue is an American politician who has served as a member of the Massachusetts House of Representatives from the 19th Worcester district since 2023.

== Personal life ==
In her marriage with Kimball Simpson, Donaghue was the mother of Brian and stepmother of Josselyn.

Brian died due to a drug overdose in 2018. Kimball died from cancer in 2021.
