= Lora Wondolowski =

American politician

Member of the Massachusetts House of Representatives
- Incumbent
- Assumed office 2027
- Preceded by: Natalie Blais
- Constituency: 1st Franklin District

President of the Greenfield City Council
- Incumbent
- Assumed office January 7, 2025

Personal details
- Born: 1969 (age 56–57)
- Party: Democratic
- Children: 2
- Education: University of Illinois Urbana-Champaign; Bard College (M.S.)
- Occupation: environmentalist politician

Lora Wondolowski (born in 1969) is an American environmentalist and politician affiliated with Democratic Party. In 2026, she was elected to represent the 1st Franklin District in the Massachusetts House of Representatives.

== Biography ==
Lora Wondolowski received a bachelor's degree in biology from the University of Illinois at Urbana-Champaign. She later earned a master's degree in environmental science at Bard College.

She worked at the National Audubon Society and the League of Conservation Voters in Washington, D.C. She was also the founding director of the Massachusetts League of Environmental Voters (MLEV), an environmental advocacy organization focused on the electoral process, and of its educational arm, the Environmental Voters Education Fund, both based in Boston.

=== Politics ===
Lora began closely following municipal politics, at Greenfield, in 2023, when the city's proposed budget called for a $1.5 million cut in the funding requested by the school district for fiscal year 2024. The council ultimately restored approximately $1.18 million. In December 2023, the City Council appointed her to the Precinct 8 seat, which had been vacant since Doug Mayo's resignation, to serve out the term until December 2025.

On January 7, 2025, after just over a year on the board, she was unanimously elected chair of the board, as the sole nominee, succeeding John Bottomley. As chair, she supported the resolution, passed in 2025, that declared Greenfield a sanctuary city for transgender and gender-diverse people. She also defended the board's decision to declare a municipal parking lot on Hope Street surplus and sell it to a developer for housing construction, a decision upheld by voters in a November 2025 referendum.

Representative Natalie Blais, who had represented Franklin's 1st District since 2019, resigned on January 19, 2026, to take an administrative position at the University of Massachusetts Amherst. Wondolowski launched her campaign on February 23, 2026, with a platform focused on affordable housing, funding for rural schools, equitable distribution of state resources to rural areas, and climate resilience. She was elected in 2026 after receiving more than 15,000 votes, defeating Amy Lavallee of the Republican Party.

==== Electoral performance ====
Year	Election	District	Votes	Result	Ref.
2026	Massachusetts House of Representatives election	1st Franklin	15 364	Elected	

== Personal life ==
Wondolowski is a single mother of two children, both of whom attend public schools in Greenfield.
