= Joshua Tarsky =

American politician

Member of the Massachusetts House of Representatives from the 13th Norfolk district
- Incumbent
- Assumed office January 4, 2025

Personal details
- Party: Democratic
- Education: Yale College; Harvard Graduate School of Education; Suffolk University Law School

Joshua Tarsky (born December 26, 1975) is an American politician, he serves as a Democratic member for the 13th Norfolk district of the Massachusetts House of Representatives since 2025. His district includes the towns of Needham, Dover, and a portion of the town of Medfield (all in Norfolk county).

Prior to his election, he was the Principal of Holbrook Middle-High School in Holbrook, Mass. and a Judge Advocate General (JAG) Attorney for the Massachusetts National Guard. Tarsky also worked as an administrator for Mashpee Middle-High School and Sandwich High School. He taught English at Lawrence High School. He also served as a Medical Sergeant in the U.S. Army Special Forces. He holds his B.A. in Theater from Yale University, his M.Ed. from Harvard University, and his J.D. from Suffolk University. Tarsky resides in Needham with his wife and their three children.

Ethnic Background:

He is Jewish through Matrilineality, and also is of Russian and Lithuanian decent.
