= Michelle Badger =

American politician

Member of the Massachusetts House of Representatives from the 1st Plymouth district
- Incumbent
- Assumed office January 1, 2025
- Preceded by: Matt Muratore

Personal details
- Party: Democratic
- Website: Campaign website

Michelle L. Badger is an American politician. She was elected to the Massachusetts House of Representatives in 2024. She was chair of the Plymouth School Committee and vice president of Massasoit Community College.

== Committee Assignments ==
For the 2025-26 Session, Badger sits on the following committees in the House:

- House Committee on Federal Funding, Policy and Accountability
- Joint Committee on Emergency Preparedness and Management
- Joint Committee on Higher Education
- Joint Committee on Housing

== Commissions ==
Badger is a member of the following commissions:

- School Transportation
- Board of Registration of Licensed Mental Health Counselors
- Plymouth Land Bank
