= Mark Sylvia =

American politician

Member of the Massachusetts House of Representatives from the 10th Bristol district
- Incumbent
- Assumed office January 1, 2025
- Preceded by: William Straus

Personal details
- Born: April 27, 1974 (age 51) New Bedford, Massachusetts
- Party: Democratic
- Education: American University (MA); American University (BA)
- Website: staterepmarksylvia.com

Mark David Sylvia is an American politician. He was elected to the Massachusetts House of Representatives in 2024. He previously served as the Chief of Staff at BlueWave Solar and was Undersecretary of Energy and Commissioner of Energy Resources for the Commonwealth of Massachusetts.
