= Dennis Gallagher (Massachusetts politician) =

American politician

Member of the Massachusetts House of Representatives from the 8th Plymouth district
- Incumbent
- Assumed office January 1, 2025
- Preceded by: Angelo D'Emilia

Personal details
- Party: Democratic
- Website: Campaign website

Dennis C. Gallagher is an American politician. He was elected to the Massachusetts House of Representatives in 2024. He was elected in a narrow race. Gallagher was a town councilor in Bridgewater, Massachusetts for nine years.
