= Michael Chaisson =

American politician

Member of the Massachusetts House of Representatives from the 1st Bristol district
- Incumbent
- Assumed office January 1, 2025
- Preceded by: F. Jay Barrows

Personal details
- Party: Republican

Michael S. Chaisson is a member of the Massachusetts House of Representatives. A resident of Foxborough, Massachusetts, he was elected as a Republican to represent the 1st Bristol district.

== Committee Assignments ==
For the 2025-26 Session, Chaisson sits on the following committees in the House:

- Ranking Minority, Joint Committee on Municipalities and Regional Government
- House Committee on Ways and Means
- Joint Committee on Community Development and Small Businesses
- Joint Committee on Financial Services
- Joint Committee on State Administration and Regulatory Oversight
- Joint Committee on Ways and Means
