= Justin Thurber =

American politician

Member of the Massachusetts House of Representatives from the 5th Bristol district
- Incumbent
- Assumed office January 1, 2025
- Preceded by: Patricia Haddad

Personal details
- Party: Republican
- Education: Bryant University

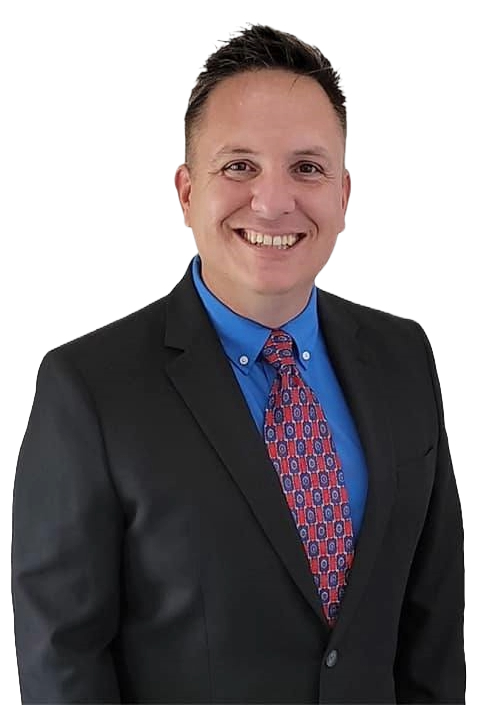

Justin Thurber is a member of the Massachusetts House of Representatives. A resident of Somerset, Massachusetts, in 2024 he was elected as a Republican to represent the 5th Bristol district.

== Committee Assignments ==
For the 2025-26 Session, Thurber sits on the following committees in the House:

- Ranking Minority, Joint Committee on Community Development and Small Businesses
- Ranking Minority, Joint Committee on Veterans and Federal Affairs
- House Committee on Climate Action and Sustainability
- House Committee on Intergovernmental Affairs
- Joint Committee on Public Health
