= James Arena-DeRosa =

American politician

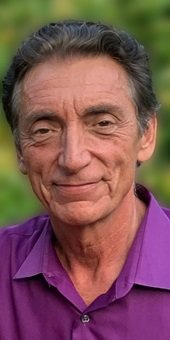

Member of the Massachusetts House of Representatives from the 8th Middlesex district
- Incumbent
- Assumed office January 18, 2023
- Preceded by: Carolyn Dykema

Personal details
- Party: Democratic
- Education: Harvard College (BA)

James Arena-DeRosa is an American politician who is the member of the Massachusetts House of Representatives from the 8th Middlesex district. He was elected in the November 2022 General Election, against Republican Loring Barnes

== See also ==
- 2023–2024 Massachusetts legislature
