= Mary Keefe =

American politician

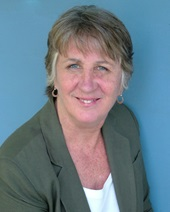

Member of the Massachusetts House of Representatives from the 15th Worcester district
- Incumbent
- Assumed office January 2, 2013
- Preceded by: Vincent Pedone

Personal details
- Party: Democratic

Mary S. Keefe is an American state legislator serving in the Massachusetts House of Representatives. She is a Worcester resident and a member of the Democratic Party.

== Electoral history ==
Since 2018, Keefe has not faced any opponents in a Democratic primary or general election.

Massachusetts 15th Worcester State Representative General Election, 2016
Party	Candidate	Votes	%
Democratic	Mary S. Keefe	8,039	78.2
Independent	Ralph Perez	2,184	21.2
Write-in		55	0.5
Total votes		10,278	100.0

She went unopposed in the 2016 Democratic Primary and 2014 General Election.

Massachusetts 15th Worcester State Representative Democratic Primary, 2014
Party	Candidate	Votes	%
Democratic	Mary S. Keefe	1,343	56.6
Democratic	Philip P. Palmieri	846	35.6
Democratic	Ralph Perez	182	7.7
Write-in		4	0.2
Total votes		2,375	100.0

Massachusetts 15th Worcester State Representative General Election, 2012
Party	Candidate	Votes	%
Democratic	Mary S. Keefe	7,654	75.0
Republican	Brian J. O'Malley	2,489	24.4
Write-in		65	0.6
Total votes		10,208	100.0

Massachusetts 15th Worcester State Representative Democratic Primary, 2012
Party	Candidate	Votes	%
Democratic	Mary S. Keefe	970	38.6
Democratic	Dianna L. Biancheria	755	30.0
Democratic	Kate Toomey	581	23.1
Democratic	Frank A. Beshai	129	5.1
Democratic	Ralph Perez	78	3.1
Write-in		3	0.1
Total votes		2,516	100.0

== See also ==
- Massachusetts House of Representatives' 15th Worcester district
- 2019–2020 Massachusetts legislature
- 2021–2022 Massachusetts legislature
