= Jen Heck =

American film director

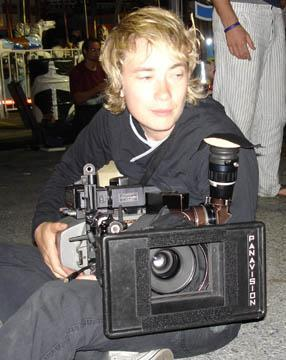
- Born: Jenifer Heck; Worcester, Massachusetts, U.S.
- Occupations: Film director, producer, screenwriter, film editor
- Years active: 2000–present

Jen Heck is a documentary filmmaker and television producer whose work has been recognized at Sundance, the Whitney Biennial, and many international film festivals. Her credits include HGTV's House Hunters International, MTV's Teen Mom, and the award-winning feature documentary The Promised Band. She directs and operates camera in challenging environments worldwide—from the Middle East to Mount Everest—telling stories from communities at society's edges. Her work has earned her recognition as a Film Independent Documentary Fellow and membership in the Producers Guild of America, Film Fatales, and New York Women in Film & Television.

Chair of the Sutton Democratic Town Committee and 2025-26 state convention delegate, she is a 2026 candidate for State Representative in the Worcester 18th District.

== Background, education, and career ==
Heck grew up in Massachusetts and Singapore. She holds degrees from NYU Tisch School of the Arts (BFA) and Columbia University School of the Arts (MFA). In 2001, she co-founded Brooklyn-based Charged Productions with filmmakers including Tunde Adebimpe of TV on the Radio. In 2004, she produced fine artist Eve Sussman's 89 Seconds at Alcazar, which premiered at the Whitney Biennial and was acquired by MoMA. In 2006, she co-wrote Hold Up with Madeleine Olnek, which premiered at Sundance, won the Audience Award at Newfest, and was subsequently included in Sundance's 2022 "best of" short film retrospective. She has shadow directed on Showtime's Dexter with Steve Shill and TNT's Leverage with Rod Hardy.

She participated in two Mount Everest expeditions, creating From the Lowest to the Highest—a film tracing a journey from the Dead Sea to Everest as a fundraising campaign for the King Hussein Cancer Center in Jordan. Locally, she is a member of the Sutton Cultural Committee and a featured artist at the Small Stones Festival of the Arts.

Heck collaborated with Van Jones and members of musician Prince's family to create a short film about Prince's secret philanthropic work entitled "Prince: A Secret Legacy of Philanthropy," featuring President Barack Obama, Janelle Monáe, Black Lives Matter co-founder Alicia Garza, and others. The piece is being developed into a feature film. She has since collaborated with Minneapolis/Saint Paul filmmaker OMG Studios and Minnesota Humanities Center on projects including the film Reconstruction Destructed, released on Juneteenth 2025, and other films exploring historic and contemporary activism in Minnesota.

== Other work ==
During her time in New York, Heck volunteered as a rape crisis counselor in Manhattan and worked with PAWS NY to help elderly pet owners keep their companion animals. She has taught filmmaking workshops at elementary schools from Queens to Cape Cod, as well as sessions for middle school students focused on her experiences on Everest and during 9/11. She served as an adjunct professor of film at Manhattanville College. She is an annual rider, fundraiser, and volunteer for the Pan-Mass Challenge in support of the Dana-Farber Cancer Institute, volunteers at a local homeless shelter, and is a former Girl Scouts leader.

== Partial filmography and recognition ==
- The Promised Band, 2016, feature documentary | Winner, Best Documentary Feature, Cinequest Film Festival
- Salamander, 2009, short | Winner, Audience Award, Columbia University Film Festival; Nominated for Iris Prize, Cardiff
- Airplanes, 2007, short | Winner, Best Short Film at Provincetown International Film Festival, The Big Movie Awards, & Zurich Pink Apple
- Hold Up, 2006, short (writer) | Official Selection, Sundance Film Festival; Winner, Best Short Film, Newfest
- The Last Days of Leni Riefenstahl, 2005, short | Winner, Best Short Film, The Big Muddy Film Festival
- 89 Seconds at Alcazar, 2004 | Official Selection, 2004 Whitney Biennial
