= Priscila Sousa =

American politician

Member of the Massachusetts House of Representatives from the 6th district
- Incumbent
- Assumed office January 4, 2023
- Preceded by: Maria Robinson

Personal details
- Born: Ipatinga, Brazil
- Party: Democratic
- Education: Simmons University (BA)

Priscila S. Sousa is an American politician serving as a member of the Massachusetts House of Representatives for the 6th district. Elected in November 2022, she assumed office on January 4, 2023.

== Early life and education ==
Sousa was born in Ipatinga, Brazil, and moved to the United States with her parents when she was seven. Raised in Framingham, Massachusetts, she graduated from Marian High School. Sousa earned a Bachelor of Arts degree in political science from Simmons University.

== Career ==
In 2009, Sousa served as an intern in the office of State Representative Barbara L'Italien. She worked as a legal assistant for Foglia & Associates, P.C. from 2009 to 2011 and Grassroots Campaigns, Inc. as an assistant director during the 2012 United States elections. Sousa worked as a training coordinator for Northwestern Mutual from 2013 to 2015 and briefly rejoined Foglia & Associates P.C. as a legal assistant in 2016. From 2016 to 2017, she worked as a legal secretary for the Wagner Law Group. Since 2019, Sousa has been a sales manager at Vivint Solar. She was elected to the Massachusetts House of Representatives in November 2022.
