= Steven Ouellette =

American politician

Member of the Massachusetts House of Representatives from the 8th Bristol district
- Incumbent
- Assumed office January 1, 2025
- Preceded by: Paul Schmid
- Succeeded by: Jesse St. Gelais (elect)

Personal details
- Party: Democratic

Steven J. Ouellette is an American politician. He was elected to the Massachusetts House of Representatives in 2024. His district contains the town of Westport and parts of Acushnet, Freetown, Fall River and New Bedford. He is a plumber by profession.
