= Cassandra Extavour =

Canadian geneticist

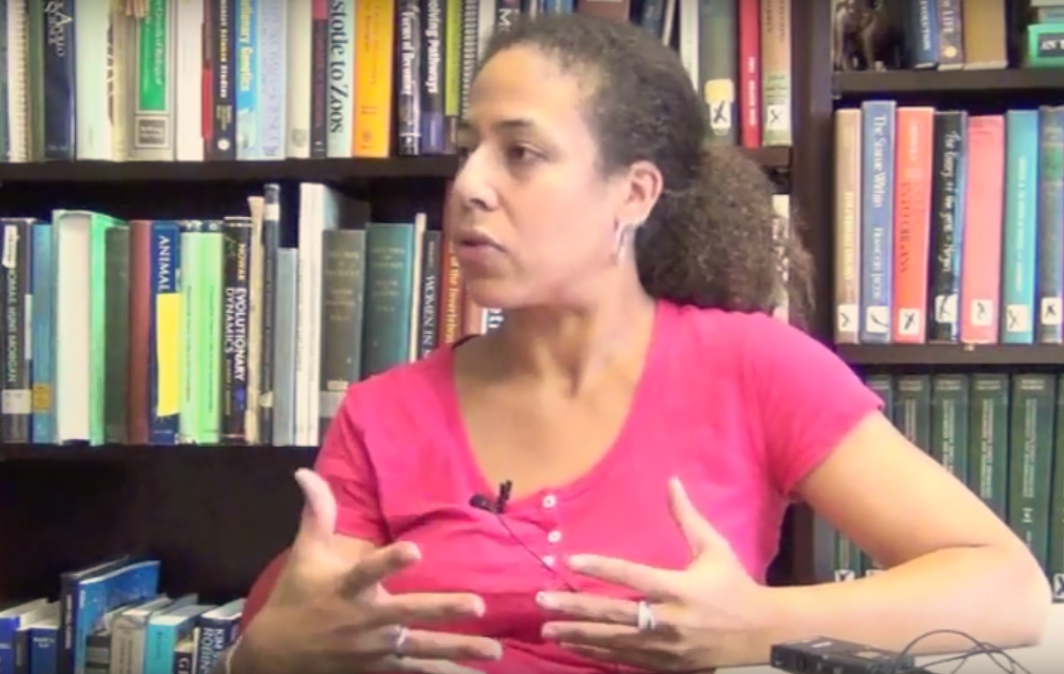
- Cassandra Extavour being interviewed in 2015
- Education: University of Toronto; Autonomous University of Madrid
- Scientific career
- Fields: Evolutionary Genetics
- Workplaces: Harvard University; Handel and Haydn Society; Emmanuel Music
- Thesis: Germ Cell Selection in Genetic Mosaics in Drosophila melanogaster (2001)

Cassandra Extavour is a Canadian geneticist, researcher of organismic and evolutionary biology, professor of molecular and cell biology at Harvard University, and a classical singer. Her research has focused on evolutionary and developmental genetics. She is known for demonstrating that germ cells engage in cell to cell competition before becoming a gamete, which indicates that natural selection can affect and change genetic material before adult sex reproduction takes place. She was also the director of EDEN (the Evo-Devo-Eco Network), a National Science Foundation-funded research collaborative that encouraged scientists working on organisms other than the standard lab model organisms to share protocols and techniques.

== Early life ==
Extavour has described growing up in a mixed race household, her father being from Trinidad and Tobago and her mother from Switzerland and Hungary, as being "critical" to her identity. Her father co-founded a Canadian celebration in 1987 to celebrate the legacy of late American civil rights activist Martin Luther King Jr. She said she was "so proud" of her dad's role in helping to bring King's message to the Black community in Toronto. Her father also played in an Afro-Caribbean band and would put her on stage with him at age five. He encouraged her to learn to play the flute, violin, steel pan, recorder, and percussion.

Extavour didn't realize she had a knack for science until high school. She did well in her math and science classes and that led her to consider a career in science when she had only ever thought of being a musician or a baker. Initially she was interested in psychology and neuroscience due to a friend's interest in the area. Her interest in developmental genetics began with a summer internship in the lab of Joe Culotti at the University of Toronto.

== Science career ==
Extavour received an Honors BSc at the University of Toronto. Her Ph.D. thesis under Antonio García-Bellido was on germ cell selection in genetic mosaics and was published in 2001 in PNAS.

In 2003 Extavour conducted a study at Cambridge University on the mechanisms of germ cell formation that showed animal germ cells were likely specified by inductive signals more often than previously thought. This went against the mainstream scientific view that animal germ cells are usually specified by maternally inherited determinants. During a 2013 interview with Quanta Magazine, she explained the concepts of this research as such: "Before there is even an embryo, the molecular content of some cells predetermines them to develop as either germ or soma. In other organisms, there is instead a signaling mechanism: An embryonic cell receives chemical signals from neighboring cells that activate (or repress) the genes that allow for germ-line function."

In 2007 Extavour founded her independent laboratory in the Department of Organismic and Evolutionary Biology at Harvard University as an assistant professor. She was promoted to associate professor in 2011 and to full professor in 2014. Some of Extavour's research during this period showed that bone morphogenetic proteins (BMPs) can help to induce primordial germ cells (PGCs) in the early stages of embryo development in a cricket. Extavour and her colleagues were able to specify that two BMPs, BMP8b and BMP4, help induce PGCs in this insect. This is significant because it was the first demonstration of a specific signaling pathway operating in the induction of embryonic germ cells in an Invertebrate.

From 2010 to 2015 Extavour directed a national research collaborative called EDEN, which stands for Evo-Devo-Eco (evolutionary-developmental-ecological) Network. The organization, funded by the National Science Foundation, encouraged scientists to develop and share tools and techniques for use in a broader spectrum of organisms than the traditionally studied laboratory model organisms. Extavour believes that a number of deep evolutionary questions cannot be answered by examining only one organism, and thus hopes that science will move past the model organism paradigm.

== Awards and nominations ==
- Harvard College Professorship, 2020
- Ellison Medical Foundation New Scholar in Aging Award
- Nominated for the Joseph R. Levenson Memorial Teaching Prize, an award given to one senior professor, one junior professor, and one teaching fellow at Harvard University each year
- Nominated for Harvard Graduate Women in Science and Engineering Mentoring Award in 2012
- Recipient of an EMBO Short Term Fellowship in 2001

== Music ==
Extavour sings Classical and Baroque music professionally. She has a soprano voice and pursues her musical career part-time, while being a scientist full-time. She has been a musician and performer since the age of five, and a professional classical singer since her undergraduate days. She now performs with a number of professional organizations nationally and internationally.

While living in Spain she studied voice under Carlos Mena and David Mason in Madrid, and with Richard Levitt in Basel, Switzerland. She has soloed with various ensemble groups, including Alia Musica in Madrid, Spain, Capella de Ministrers in Valencia, Spain, Capilla Real de Madrid, and Emmanuel Music in Boston. She sang as a freelance soloist in the United Kingdom, in operas including Mozart's The Marriage of Figaro and Humperdinck's Hansel and Gretel. She recently performed as a soloist in the Auckland Choral Society production of Handel's Messiah in New Zealand in December 2016. She sings in the Handel and Haydn Society chorus in Boston.

== Publications ==
Her most highly cited publications are:

- Extavour, CG, M Akam "Mechanisms of germ cell specification across the metazoans: epigenesis and preformation" ''Development'' 2004 Dec125, 130 (24) 589-840 According to Google Scholar, this publication has been cited 649 times as of June 27, 2020.
- Ewen-Campen, Evelyn E Schwager, and Cassandra GM Extavour, ''The molecular machinery of germ line specification'' Molecular and Cellular Reproduction. Volume 77, Issue 1, pages 3–18, January 2010. According to Google Scholar, this publication has been cited 139 times as of June 27, 2020.
