= Erika Uyterhoeven =

Massachusetts politician

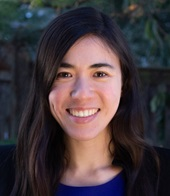

Member of the Massachusetts House of Representatives from the 27th Middlesex district
- Incumbent
- Assumed office January 6, 2021
- Preceded by: Denise Provost

Personal details
- Born: July 26, 1986 (age 40) Boston, Massachusetts, U.S.
- Party: Democratic
- Other political affiliations: Democratic Socialists of America
- Education: Wellesley College; University of Toulouse; Harvard Business School

Erika Uyterhoeven (/ˈaɪtərhoʊvən/; born July 26, 1986) is a member of the Massachusetts House of Representatives for the 27th Middlesex district and the Senator-elect from the 2nd Middlesex district. Uyterhoeven is a member of the Democratic Party and the Democratic Socialists of America (DSA). Prior to serving in elected office, Uyterhoeven was a political activist and antitrust economist.

== Early life and education ==
Uyterhoeven was born on July 26, 1986, to a single mother born in Japan. Her mother was a union flight attendant, and Uyterhoeven has cited the rise of neoliberalism and the decline of the labor movement beginning in the 1980s as formative for her political development. Her father was a professor at Harvard Business School.

Uyterhoeven attended Wayland High School in Wayland, Massachusetts, graduating in 2004. She received her bachelor's degree from Wellesley College in 2010, and received a master’s degree from the University of Toulouse in 2014. In 2019, Uyterhoeven graduated with a master’s in business administration (MBA) from Harvard Business School.

== Political career ==
=== Massachusetts House ===
In 2020, Uyterhoeven ran to replace retiring incumbent Denise Provost as the member of the Massachusetts House of Representatives 27th Middlesex district. Running as a self-described democratic socialist, Uyterhoeven's successful campaign emphasized support for increased government transparency.

She previously organized with Momentum, a socialist organization in the United Kingdom. Uyterhoeven is a member of the Democratic Socialists of America (DSA).

Uyterhoeven ran successfully reelection in the 2022 election, after successfully winning the nomination against a primary challenger. Her campaign literature cited endorsements from the Massachusetts Nurses Association, the Massachusetts Teachers Association, Reproductive Equity Now, Massachusetts AFL-CIO, SEIU Local 509, Somerville Municipal Employees Assoc., United Auto Workers, IBEW 2222, Boston DSA, Massachusetts Sierra Club, Progressive Massachusetts, and LIUNA (Laborers International Union North America).

In 2026, Uyterhoeven generated media attention from an social media post in which she said "We need to get ICE the f— out of Massachusetts" then proceeded to discuss issues such as including ending the Massachusetts Department of Correction's 287(g) agreement with ICE and ending the use of automatic license plate readers.

=== Massachusetts Senate ===
Uyterhoeven declared her candidacy for the Massachusetts Senate's 2nd Middlesex District in March 2026 after Patricia D. Jehlen announced her retirement.

On September 2, 2026, Uyterhoeven declared victory after all three of her opponents conceded on election night. Uyterhoeven was elected to the State Senate on November 3, 2026, without facing any opposition in the general election.
