= Bridget Plouffe =

American politician

Member of the Massachusetts House of Representatives from the 9th Plymouth district
- Incumbent
- Assumed office January 1, 2025
- Preceded by: Gerard Cassidy

Personal details
- Party: Democratic
- Website: Campaign website

Bridget M. Plouffe is an American politician. She was elected to the Massachusetts House of Representatives in 2024.

Plouffe worked for Brockton Public Schools before being hired by Representative Gerard Cassidy.

== Committee Assignments ==
For the 2025-26 Session, Plouffe sits on the following committees in the House:

- House Committee on Human Resources and Employee Engagement
- Joint Committee on Cannabis Policy
- Joint Committee on Education
- Joint Committee on Public Safety and Homeland Security
- Joint Committee on Revenue
