= Kenneth Sweezey =

American politician

Member of the Massachusetts House of Representatives from the 6th Plymouth district
- Incumbent
- Assumed office January 1, 2025
- Preceded by: Josh Cutler

Personal details
- Party: Republican
- Website: Campaign website

Kenneth Peter Sweezey is a member of the Massachusetts House of Representatives. A resident of Pembroke, Massachusetts, he was elected as a Republican to represent the 6th Plymouth district.
