= Sokhary Chau =

Cambodian American politician

93rd Mayor of Lowell, Massachusetts
- In office January 3, 2022 – January 2, 2024
- Preceded by: John Leahy
- Succeeded by: Daniel Rourke

Member of the Lowell City Council
- Incumbent
- Assumed office 2019

Personal details
- Born: 1972 or 1973 (age 53–54) Battambang province, Cambodia
- Profession: Politician, Businessman

Sokhary Chau (Khmer: ចៅ សុខារី; pronuniciation: So-Ka-Ree Chao; 1972 or 1973) is a Cambodian born American politician. In 2022, the City Council of Lowell, Massachusetts elected him to become the next mayor, becoming the first person of Cambodian descent to serve as a mayor in the United States.

== Early life and education ==
Chau was born to a middle class family in Battambang province, Cambodia, as one of seven children. His father, Chau Samouen, was a medical doctor who met Chau's mother, Hay Hem, while treating her family as patients free of charge in Hem's hometown of Khnach Romeas. The pair married in 1956. Samouen joined the Khmer National Armed Forces to fight Khmer Rouge insurgents in the Cambodian Civil War, becoming an army caaptain. During the fall of Phnom Penh in 1975, Chau's father was executed by gunshot as one of several residents who refused to forcibly vacate the city at the orders of the new Khmer Rouge government.

Much of his early childhood was spent in extreme hardship and fear, almost losing two of his brothers to executions. Despite these circumstances, his family escaped Cambodia in 1979 under the cover of night through land mine laced jungles to a Thai refugee camp. In 1981 he, his mother, and his six siblings emigrated to the United States as refugees, eventually settling in Lowell. As a child, he attended Lowell Public Schools and Phillips Academy, graduating in 1992.

He attended Macalaster College in Minnesota.

== Political/Business Career ==
He was elected to a 2-year term on Lowell City Council in 2019 and re-elected in 2021.

Members of the City Council appointed him Mayor of Lowell in January 2022.

He is the current chair of the USA-Cambodia Sports Association.

In November 2023, he announced that he would run for the Middlesex County Register of Deeds seat that will become vacant in 2024.

Political offices
Preceded by John Leahy	Mayor of Lowell; January 3, 2022—present	Succeeded by Incumbent
