= Rodney Elliott =

American politician (born 1960)

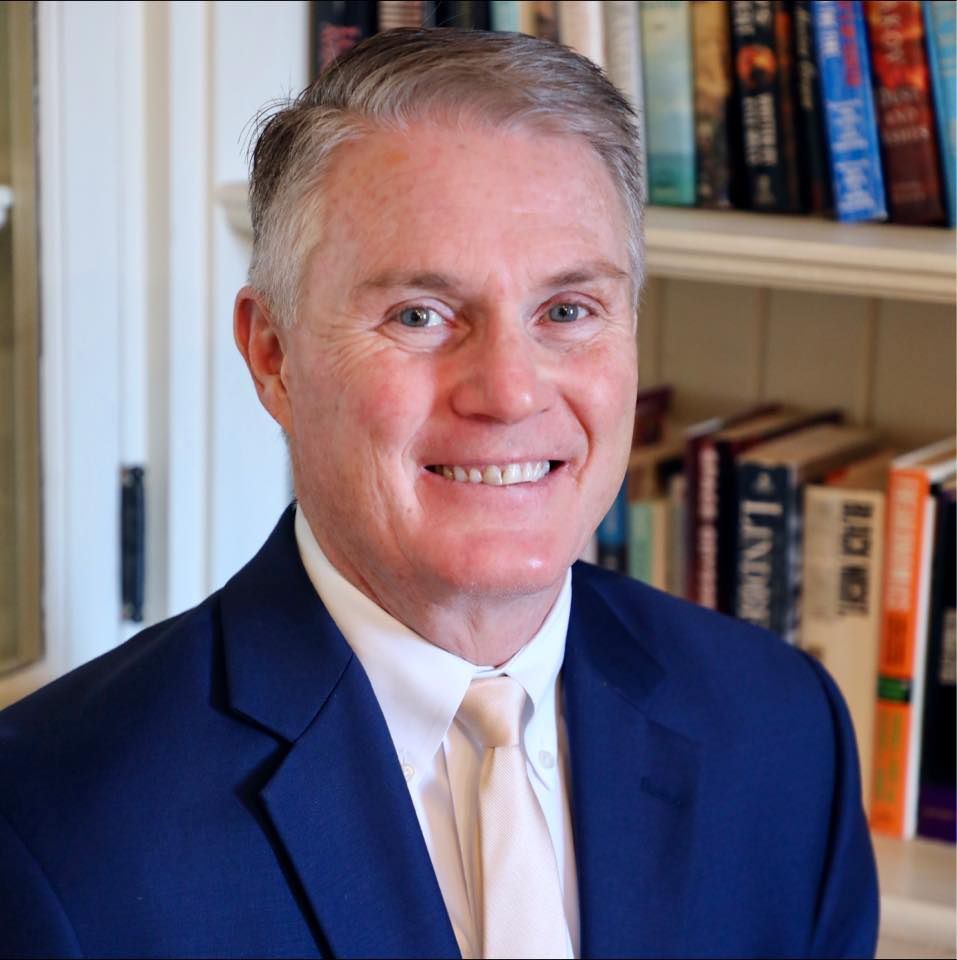
- Elliott in 2023

Member of the Massachusetts House of Representatives from the 16th Middlesex district
- In office January 4, 2023 – August 1, 2026
- Preceded by: Thomas Golden Jr.
- Succeeded by: Vacant

Mayor of Lowell, Massachusetts
- In office January 6, 2014 – January 5, 2016
- Preceded by: Patrick O. Murphy
- Succeeded by: Edward J. Kennedy

City Councilor of Lowell, Massachusetts
- In office 1997–2022
- Succeeded by: Dan Rourke

Personal details
- Party: Democratic
- Education: Plymouth State University; Suffolk University; Catholic University

Rodney Elliott (born 1960) is an American politician who represented the 16th Middlesex District of Massachusetts in the Massachusetts House of Representatives from 2023 to 2026. He previously served as the mayor of Lowell, Massachusetts from 2014 to 2016, and served on the city's council from 1997 to 2022.

== Early life and education ==
Rodney Elliott was born to Francis and Theresa Elliott, in Lowell, Massachusetts. He grew up in the Pawtucketville section of Lowell, Massachusetts, where he attended Saint Jeanne d'Arc School. He has four sisters.

He earned a bachelor's degree from Plymouth State University in 1982, a M. P. A. in from Suffolk University in 1989, and a master's from The Catholic University of America in 1994. In 1991, he started a career with the United States Environmental Protection Agency.

== Political career ==
Before running for office, he worked as a city planner in Lowell, as an aide to Phil Shea, and for the town of Groton, Massachusetts. Elliott ran for office in 1995 but lost his initial run. He ran again in 1997, and was successfully elected to the Lowell City Council. He spent 24 years as part of the council where he focused on the city's finances. He was known as the "fiscal watchdog". In 2021, he lost his reelection campaign to Dan Rourke.

During his tenure on the city council, he supported a citywide ban on pit bulls.

=== Mayor of Lowell ===
Elliott was elected as Lowell's 34th Mayor on January 6, 2014. The Lowell Sun Newspaper endorsed him for a second term. He left office on January 5, 2016.

During the beginning of his first term as mayor, a notable fire occurred in the Cambodian community in Lowell. The fire killed seven and displaced over fifty people, including children and elderly. Elliott spent significant time organizing donations, and corresponding with federal agencies to get the displaced individuals replacements for important documents. He later traveled to Phnom Penh and met the Prime Minister of Cambodia Hun Sen when Lowell was made a sister city for Phnom Penh. Lowell has the second largest Cambodian-American population in the United States, after Long Beach, California.

In 2018, he ran for the 1st Middlesex district of the Massachusetts Senate, but lost the Democratic primary to Edward J. Kennedy.

=== Massachusetts State Representative ===
Elliott filed for the Massachusetts House of Representatives' 16th Middlesex district in 2022. He faced Zoe Dzineku in the Democratic primary, which he won by 102 votes. He received 65.3% of the vote on November 8, 2022, defeating the Republican candidate Karla Miller for the office. In 2024, he ran for reelection unopposed.

In 2023, he proposed criminalizing the assault and battery of a sports official.

Elliott resigned from the Massachusetts House on August 1, 2026.
