= 2023–2024 Massachusetts legislature =

193rd Massachusetts General Court

193rd Massachusetts General Court
←	192nd	194th	→
- Seal of the General Court of Massachusetts

Overview
- Legislative body: Massachusetts General Court
- Meeting place: Massachusetts State House
- Term: January 4, 2023 – January 7, 2025

Senate
- President: Karen E. Spilka
- Party control: Democratic

House of Representatives
- Speaker: Ronald Mariano
- Party control: Democratic

Sessions
- 1st: January 4, 2023 – TBD

The 193rd Massachusetts General Court was a meeting of the legislative branch of the state government of Massachusetts, composed of the Massachusetts Senate and the Massachusetts House of Representatives. It first convened in Boston at the Massachusetts State House on January 4, 2023, on the last day of the governorship of Charlie Baker, and continued through the first two years of Governor Maura Healey's first term. The term ended on January 7, 2025.

== Major events ==
- January 4, 2023: General Court convened. Ron Mariano (D) was elected Speaker of the House and Karen Spilka, by unanimous consent, was elected President of the Massachusetts Senate. Members-elect of the Massachusetts Senate and the Massachusetts House of Representatives were sworn in, except for Kristin Kassner (D) and Margaret Scarsdale (D), whose vote count and election certification would be reviewed by a Special House Committee.
- January 5, 2023: Governor-elect Maura Healey (D) and Lieutenant Governor-elect Kim Driscoll (D) were sworn in by the President of the Massachusetts Senate, Karen Spilka, during a joint session of the Massachusetts General Court.
- January 18, 2023: The Special House Committee ruled in favor of Margaret Scarsdale (D) and she was sworn in later that same day.
- February 3, 2023: The Special House Committee ruled in favor of Kristin Kassner (D) and she was sworn in later that same day.

== Composition by party ==
Resignations and new members are discussed in the "Changes in membership" section below.

=== Senate ===
Overview of Senate membership by party
Current (November 29, 2023) (June 5, 2023) Begin (January 4, 2023)
	Party (shading shows control)			Total	Vacant
	Democratic	Independent	Republican	Total	Vacant
End of previous General Court	36	0	3	39	1
Begin (January 4, 2023)	37	0	3	40	0
June 5, 2023 (Note: Anne Gobi (D) resigned from the Massachusetts Senate to accept a job in the gubernatorial administration of Gov. Maura Healey.)	36	0	3	39	1
November 29, 2023 (Note: Peter Durant (R) resigned from the Massachusetts House and was sworn into the Massachusetts Senate.)	36	0	4	40	0
Latest voting share	90.0%	0.0%	10.0%		

=== House of Representatives ===
Overview of House membership by party
Current (June 7, 2023) March 1, 2023 February 28, 2023 February 3, 2023 January 18, 2023 - February 3, 2023 Begin (January 4, 2023 – January 18, 2023)
	Party (shading shows control)			Total	Vacant
	Democratic	Independent	Republican	Total	Vacant
End of previous General Court	125	1	27	153	7
Begin (January 4, 2023)	132	1	26	159	1
January 18, 2023 (Note: Margaret Scarsdale (D) was sworn in.)	133	1	26	160	0
February 3, 2023 (Note: Kristin Kassner (D) was sworn in.)	134	1	25	160	0
February 28, 2023 (Note: Edward Coppinger (D) resigned from the Massachusetts House of Representatives to accept a job with the Massachusetts Biotechnology Council (MassBio).)	133	1	25	159	1
March 1, 2023 (Note: Jon Santiago (D) resigned from the Massachusetts House of Representatives to accept a job in the gubernatorial administration of Gov. Maura Healey.)	132	1	25	158	2
June 7, 2023 (Note: Special Elections in two Boston-based House seats restore the House to full strength)	134	1	25	160	0
November 29, 2023	134	1	24	159	1
February 4, 2024 (Note: Democrat Josh S. Cutler resigned to accept a job in the gubernatorial administration of Gov. Maura Healey.)	133	1	24	158	2
March 27, 2024 (Note: Republican John Marsi was sworn in.)	133	1	25	159	1
September 22, 2024 (Note: Democrat Sarah Peake resigned to accept a job in the gubernatorial administration of Gov. Maura Healey.)	132	1	25	158	2
October 22, 2024 (Note: Republican Susan Williams Gifford died.)	132	1	24	157	3
Latest voting share	84.7%		15.3%		

== Leadership ==
=== Senate ===
==== Presiding ====
- President: Karen E. Spilka (D)
- President pro tempore: William N. Brownsberger (D)

==== Majority (Democratic) ====
- Majority Leader: Cynthia Stone Creem
- Assistant Majority Leader: Joan Lovely
- Assistant Majority Leader: Michael J. Barrett
- Assistant Majority Leader: Sal DiDomenico
- Majority Whip: Michael Rush
- Assistant Majority Whip: Julian Cyr
- Senate Ways and Means Chair: Michael Rodrigues
- Senate Ways and Means Vice Chair: Cindy Friedman

==== Minority (Republican) ====
- Minority Leader: Bruce E. Tarr
- Assistant Minority Leader: Patrick O'Connor
- Assistant Minority Leader: Ryan Fattman

=== House of Representatives ===
==== Presiding ====
- Speaker: Ronald Mariano (D)
- Speaker pro tempore: Kate Hogan (D)

==== Majority (Democratic) ====
- Majority Leader: Michael Moran
- Assistant Majority Leader: Alice Peisch
- Second Assistant Majority Leader: Frank A. Moran
- Second Assistant Majority Leader: Sarah Peake
- First Division Chair: Danielle Gregoire
- Second Division Chair: Paul Donato
- Third Division Chair: Ruth Balser
- Fourth Division Chair: James O'Day
- House Ways and Means Chair: Aaron Michlewitz

==== Minority (Republican) ====
- Minority Leader: Bradley H. Jones Jr.
- First Assistant Minority Leader: Kimberly Ferguson
- Second Assistant Minority Leader: Paul Frost
- Third Assistant Minority Leader: Susan Williams Gifford
- Third Assistant Minority Leader: F. Jay Barrows

Senate presiding officers

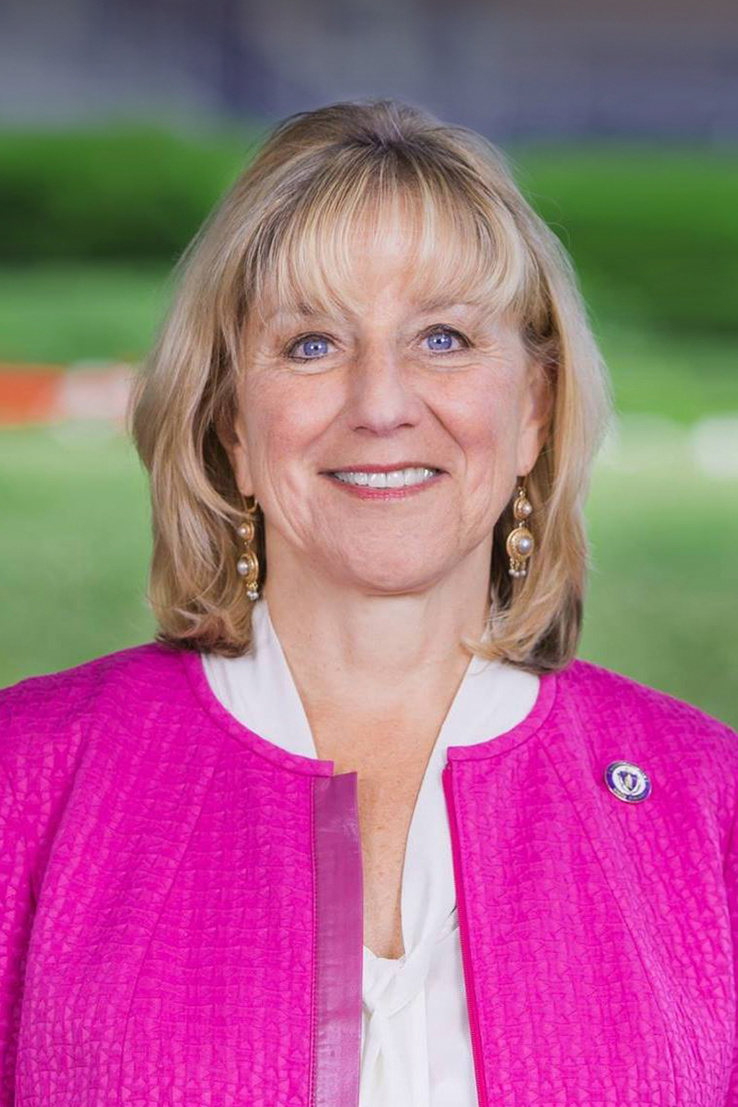
President
Karen E. Spilka (D)

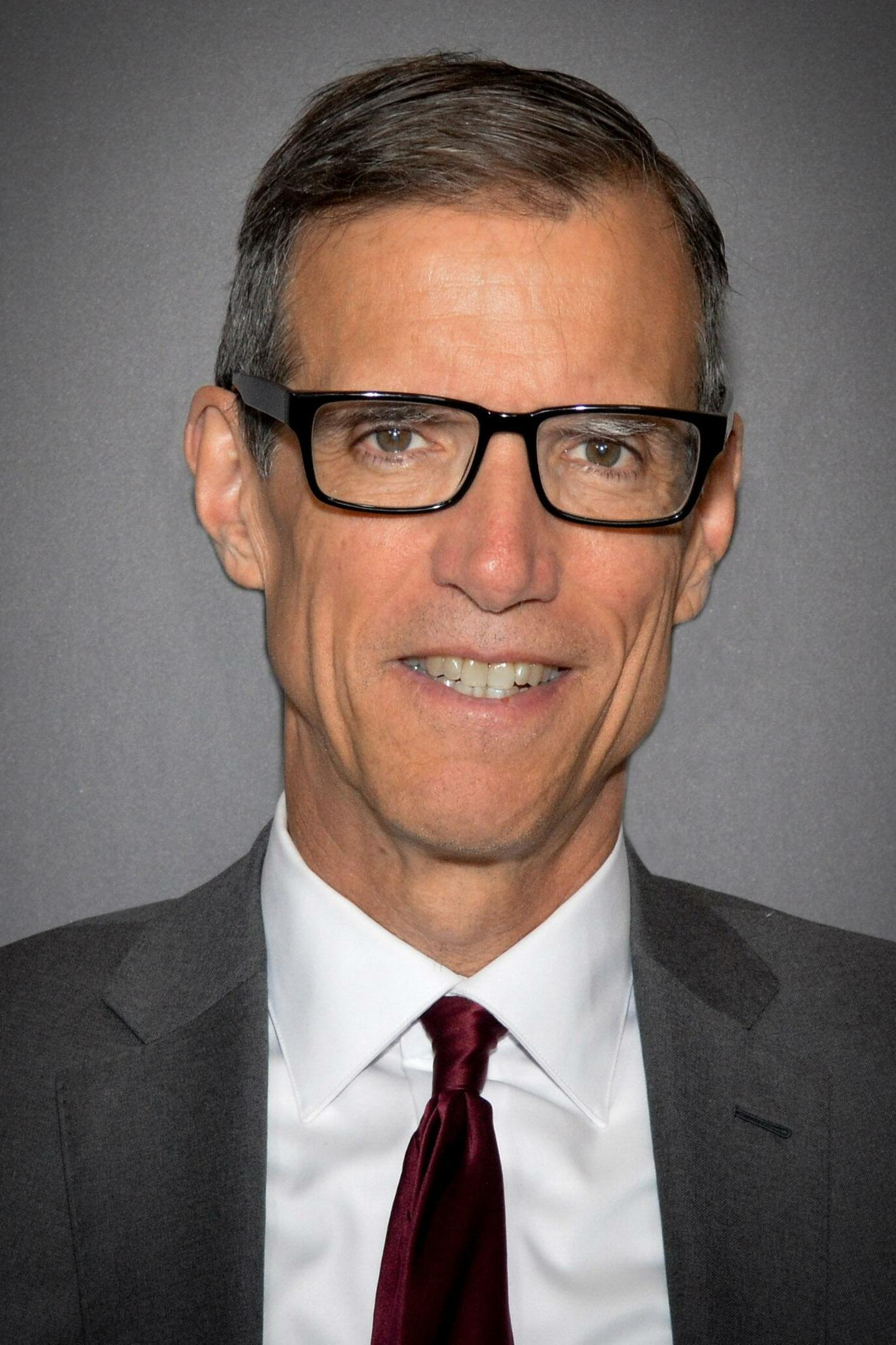
President pro tempore
Will Brownsberger (D)

House presiding officers

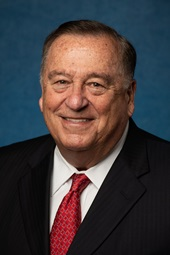
Speaker
Ronald Mariano (D)

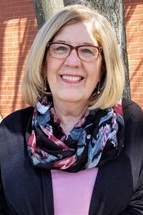
Speaker pro tempore
Kate Hogan (D)

== Members ==
=== Senate ===
All 40 seats were filled by the election in November 2022. The districts are named and numbered based upon the county or counties they reside in.

==== Berkshire, Hampshire, Franklin and Hampden ====
▌At-large. Paul Mark (D)

==== Bristol and Norfolk ====
▌At-large. Paul Feeney (D)

==== Bristol and Plymouth ====
▌1. Michael Rodrigues (D)
▌2. Mark Montigny (D)
▌3. Marc Pacheco (D)

==== Cape and Islands ====
▌At-large. Julian Cyr (D)

==== Essex ====
▌1. Pavel Payano (D)
▌2. Joan Lovely (D)
▌3. Brendan Crighton (D)

==== Essex and Middlesex ====
▌1. Bruce Tarr (R)
▌2. Barry Finegold (D)

==== Hampden ====
▌At-large. Adam Gomez (D)

==== Hampden and Hampshire ====
▌At-large. John Velis (D)

==== Hampden, Hampshire and Worcester ====
▌At-large. Jacob Oliveira (D)

==== Hampshire, Franklin and Worcester ====
▌At-large. Jo Comerford (D)

==== Middlesex ====
▌1. Edward J. Kennedy (D)
▌2. Patricia D. Jehlen (D)
▌3. Michael J. Barrett (D)
▌4. Cindy Friedman (D)
▌5. Jason Lewis (D)

==== Middlesex and Norfolk ====
▌At-large. Karen Spilka (D)

==== Middlesex and Suffolk ====
▌At-large. Sal DiDomenico (D)

==== Middlesex and Worcester ====
▌At-large. Jamie Eldridge (D)

==== Norfolk and Middlesex ====
▌At-large. Cynthia Stone Creem (D)

==== Norfolk and Plymouth ====
▌At-large. John Keenan (D)

==== Norfolk, Plymouth and Bristol ====
▌At-large. Walter Timilty (D)

==== Norfolk and Suffolk ====
▌At-large. Mike Rush (D)

==== Norfolk, Worcester and Middlesex ====
▌At-large. Becca Rausch (D)

==== Plymouth and Barnstable ====
▌At-large. Susan Moran (D)

==== Plymouth and Norfolk ====
▌1. Patrick O'Connor (R)
▌2. Michael Brady (D)

==== Suffolk ====
▌1. Nick Collins (D)
▌2. Liz Miranda (D)
▌3. Lydia Edwards (D)

==== Suffolk and Middlesex ====
▌At-large. Will Brownsberger (D)

==== Worcester ====
▌1. Robyn Kennedy (D)
▌2. Michael O. Moore (D)

==== Worcester and Hampden ====
▌At-large. Ryan Fattman (R)

==== Worcester and Hampshire ====
▌At-large. Anne Gobi (D) (until June 4, 2023)

▌ Peter Durant (R) (from November 29, 2023)

==== Worcester and Middlesex ====
▌At-large. John J. Cronin (D)

Current Senate composition by district Democratic held Republican held Independent held Vacant

Senate leadership

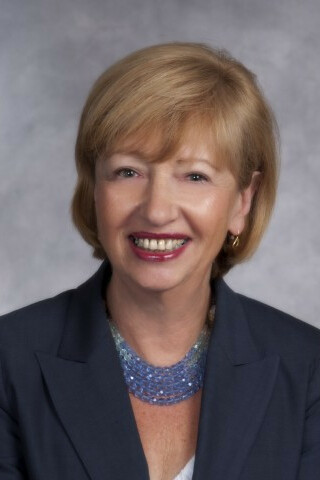
Majority leader
Cynthia Stone Creem (D)

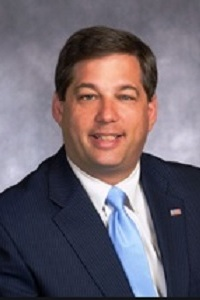
Minority leader
Bruce E. Tarr (R)

=== House of Representatives ===
All 160 seats were filled by the election in November 2022. The districts are named and numbered based upon the county or counties they reside in.

==== Barnstable ====
▌1. Chris Flanagan (D)
▌2. Kip Diggs (D)
▌3. David Vieira (R)
▌4. Sarah Peake (D) (until September 22, 2024)

▌ Vacant (from September 22, 2024)

▌5. Steven Xiarhos (R)

==== Barnstable, Dukes and Nantucket ====
▌At-large. Dylan Fernandes (D)

==== Berkshire ====
▌1. John Barret III (D)
▌2. Tricia Farley-Bouvier (D)
▌3. William Pignatelli (D)

==== Bristol ====
▌1. F. Jay Barrows (R)
▌2. James Hawkins (D)
▌3. Carol Doherty (D)
▌4. Steve Howitt (R)
▌5. Patricia Haddad (D)
▌6. Carole Fiola (D)
▌7. Alan Silvia (D)
▌8. Paul Schmid (D)
▌9. Christopher Markey (D)
▌10. William M. Straus (D)
▌11. Christopher Hendricks (D)
▌12. Norman Orrall (R)
▌13. Antonio Cabral (D)
▌14. Adam Scanlon (D)

==== Essex ====
▌1. Dawne Shand (D)
▌2. Leonard Mirra (R) (until February 3, 2023) (Note: Previously Contested. Incumbent Leonard Mirra (R) was seated as a "hold-over" representative while a Special House Committee examined the vote returns for each candidate, which were certified in having Kristin Kassner (D) winning by 1 vote. The Special House Committee, in a 2-1 vote, decided in favor of Kristin Kassner.)

▌ Kristin Kassner (D) (from February 3, 2023)

▌3. Andy Vargas (D)
▌4. Estela Reyes (D)
▌5. Ann-Margaret Ferrante (D)
▌6. Jerry Parisella (D)
▌7. Manny Cruz (D)
▌8. Jenny Armini (D)
▌9. Donald Wong (R)
▌10. Dan Cahill (D)
▌11. Peter Capano (D)
▌12. Thomas Walsh (D)
▌13. Sally Kerans (D)
▌14. Adrianne Ramos (D)
▌15. Ryan Hamilton (D)
▌16. Francisco E. Paulino (D)
▌17. Frank A. Moran (D)
▌18. Tram Nguyen (D)

==== Franklin ====
▌1. Natalie Blais (D)
▌2. Susannah Whipps (I)

==== Hampden ====
▌1. Todd Smola (R)
▌2. Brian Michael Ashe (D)
▌3. Nicholas Boldyga (R)
▌4. Kelly Pease (R)
▌5. Patricia Duffy (D)
▌6. Michael Finn (D)
▌7. Aaron Saunders (D)
▌8. Shirley Arriaga (D)
▌9. Orlando Ramos (D)
▌10. Carlos González (D)
▌11. Bud Williams (D)
▌12. Angelo Puppolo (D)

==== Hampshire ====
▌1. Lindsay Sabadosa (D)
▌2. Daniel Carey (D)
▌3. Mindy Domb (D)

==== Middlesex ====
▌1. Margaret Scarsdale (D) (from January 18, 2023) (Note: Previously Contested. Vacant while a Special House Committee reviewed the vote returns for each candidate. The committee ruled in favor of Margaret Scarsdale (D).)
▌2. James Arciero (D)
▌3. Kate Hogan (D)
▌4. Danielle Gregoire (D)
▌5. David Linsky (D)
▌6. Priscila Sousa (D)
▌7. Jack Patrick Lewis (D)
▌8. James Arena-DeRosa (D)
▌9. Thomas M. Stanley (D)
▌10. John J. Lawn (D)
▌11. Kay Khan (D)
▌12. Ruth Balser (D)
▌13. Carmine Gentile (D)
▌14. Simon Cataldo (D)
▌15. Michelle Ciccolo (D)
▌16. Rodney Elliott (D)
▌17. Vanna Howard (D)
▌18. Rady Mom (D)
▌19. David Allen Robertson (D)

==== Middlesex (cont.) ====
▌20. Bradley H. Jones Jr. (R)
▌21. Kenneth Gordon (D)
▌22. Marc Lombardo (R)
▌23. Sean Garballey (D)
▌24. David Rogers (D)
▌25. Marjorie Decker (D)
▌26. Michael Connolly (D)
▌27. Erika Uyterhoeven (D)
▌28. Joe McGonagle (D)
▌29. Steven Owens (D)
▌30. Richard Haggerty (D)
▌31. Michael S. Day (D)
▌32. Kate Lipper-Garabedian (D)
▌33. Steven Ultrino (D)
▌34. Christine Barber (D)
▌35. Paul Donato (D)
▌36. Colleen Garry (D)
▌37. Danillo Sena (D)

==== Norfolk ====
▌1. Bruce Ayers (D)
▌2. Tackey Chan (D)
▌3. Ron Mariano (D)
▌4. James M. Murphy (D)
▌5. Mark Cusack (D)
▌6. William C. Galvin (D)
▌7. William Driscoll (D)
▌8. Ted Philips (D)
▌9. Marcus Vaughn (R)
▌10. Jeffrey Roy (D)
▌11. Paul McMurtry (D)
▌12. John H. Rogers (D)
▌13. Denise Garlick (D)
▌14. Alice Peisch (D)
▌15. Tommy Vitolo (D)

==== Plymouth ====
▌1. Matthew Muratore (R)
▌2. Susan Williams Gifford (R) (until October 22, 2024)

▌ Vacant (from October 22, 2024)

▌3. Joan Meschino (D)
▌4. Patrick Joseph Kearney (D)
▌5. David DeCoste (R)
▌6. Josh S. Cutler (D) (until February 4, 2024)

▌ Vacant (from February 4, 2024)

▌7. Alyson Sullivan (R)
▌8. Angelo D'Emilia (R)
▌9. Gerard Cassidy (D)
▌10. Michelle DuBois (D)
▌11. Rita Mendes (D)
▌12. Kathleen LaNatra (D)

==== Suffolk ====
▌1. Adrian Madaro (D)
▌2. Daniel Joseph Ryan (D)
▌3. Aaron Michlewitz (D)
▌4. David Biele (D)
▌5. Christopher Worrell (D)
▌6. Russell Holmes (D)
▌7. Chynah Tyler (D)
▌8. Jay Livingstone (D)
▌9. Jon Santiago (D) (until March 1, 2023)

▌ John F. Moran (D) (from June 8, 2023)

▌10. Edward F. Coppinger (D) (until February 28, 2023)

▌ Bill MacGregor (D) (from June 8, 2023)

▌11. Judith García (D)
▌12. Brandy Fluker Oakley (D)
▌13. Daniel J. Hunt (D)
▌14. Robert Consalvo (D)
▌15. Sam Montaño (D)
▌16. Jessica Giannino (D)
▌17. Kevin Honan (D)
▌18. Michael Moran (D)
▌19. Jeffrey Turco (D)

==== Worcester ====
▌1. Kimberly Ferguson (R)
▌2. Jonathan Zlotnik (D)
▌3. Michael Kushmerek (D)
▌4. Natalie Higgins (D)
▌5. Donald Berthiaume (R)
▌6. Peter Durant (R) (until November 29, 2023)

▌ John Marsi (R) (from March 27, 2024)

▌7. Paul Frost (R)
▌8. Michael Soter (R)
▌9. David Muradian (R)
▌10. Brian Murray (D)
▌11. Hannah Kane (R)
▌12. Meghan Kilcoyne (D)
▌13. John J. Mahoney (D)
▌14. James O'Day (D)
▌15. Mary Keefe (D)
▌16. Dan Donahue (D)
▌17. David LeBoeuf (D)
▌18. Joseph McKenna (R)
▌19. Kate Donaghue (D)

Current House composition by district Democratic held Republican held Independent held Vacant

House leadership

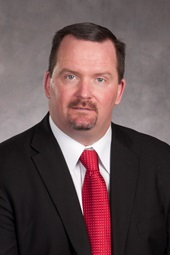
Majority leader
Michael J. Moran (D)

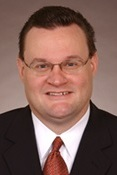
Minority leader
Bradley H. Jones Jr. (R)

== Changes in membership ==
=== Senate changes ===
District	Vacated by	Reason for change	Successor	Date of successor's formal installation
Worcester and Hampshire	Anne Gobi (D)	Resigned June 4, 2023 from the Massachusetts Senate to accept a job in the gubernatorial administration of Gov. Maura Healey.	Peter Durant (R)	November 29, 2023

=== House of Representatives changes ===
District	Vacated by	Reason for change	Successor	Date of successor's formal installation
1st Middlesex	Vacant	The winner of this seat was contested, so a Special House Committee was called to review the vote returns. The Special House Committee ruled in favor of Margaret Scarsdale.	Margaret Scarsdale (D)	January 18, 2023
2nd Essex	Leonard Mirra (R)	The winner of this seat was contested, so a Special House Committee was called to review the vote returns. The Special House Committee ruled 2-1 in favor of Kristin Kassner.	Kristin Kassner (D)	February 3, 2023
10th Suffolk	Edward Coppinger (D)	Resigned February 28, 2023 from the Massachusetts House of Representatives to accept a job with the Massachusetts Biotechnology Council (MassBio).	Bill MacGregor (D)	June 8, 2023
9th Suffolk	Jon Santiago (D)	Resigned March 1, 2023 from the Massachusetts House of Representatives to accept a job in the gubernatorial administration of Gov. Maura Healey.	John F. Moran (D)	June 8, 2023
6th Worcester	Peter Durant (R)	Resigned November 29, 2023 from the Massachusetts House of Representatives after being elected to the Massachusetts Senate.	John Marsi (R)	March 27, 2024
6th Plymouth	Josh S. Cutler (D)	Resigned February 4, 2024 from the Massachusetts House of Representatives to accept a job in the gubernatorial administration of Gov. Maura Healey.	Vacant until next election	
4th Barnstable	Sarah Peake (D)	Resigned September 22, 2024 from the Massachusetts House of Representatives to accept a job in the gubernatorial administration of Gov. Maura Healey.	Vacant until next election	
2nd Plymouth	Susan Williams Gifford (R)	Died October 22, 2024.	Vacant until next election	

== Committees ==
=== Senate Committees ===
Committee	Chair	Ranking Minority
Bills in the Third Reading	Sal N. DiDomenico	Bruce E. Tarr
Census	William N. Brownsberger	Ryan C. Fattman
Ethics	Jason M. Lewis	Patrick M. O' Connor
Global Warming and Climate Change	Cynthia Stone Creem	Patrick M. O' Connor
Intergovernmental Affairs	Mark C. Montigny	Patrick M. O' Connor
Juvenile and Emerging Adult Justice	Brendan P. Crighton	Bruce E. Tarr
Personnel and Administration	Michael F. Rush	Patrick M. O' Connor
Post Audit and Oversight	Marc R. Pacheco	Ryan C. Fattman
Rules	Joan B. Lovely	Ryan C. Fattman
Steering and Policy	Mark C. Montigny	Bruce E. Tarr
Ways and Means	Michael J. Rodrigues	Patrick M. O' Connor

=== House of Representatives Committees ===
Committee	Chair	Ranking Minority
Bills in the Third Reading	Thomas P. Walsh	Angelo L. D'Emilia
Ethics	John Barrett, III	F. Jay Barrows
Federal Stimulus and Census Oversight	Jack Patrick Lewis	Todd M. Smola
Global Warming and Climate Change	Sean Garballey	Kimberly N. Ferguson
Human Resources and Employee Engagement	Daniel J. Hunt	Joseph D. McKenna
Operations, Facilities and Security	Joseph W. McGonagle, Jr.	Marcus S. Vaughn
Post Audit and Oversight	John J. Mahoney	Peter J. Durant
Rules	William C. Galvin	David H. Wong
Steering, Policy and Scheduling	Kevin G. Honan	Susan Williams Gifford
Ways and Means	Aaron Michlewitz	Todd M. Smola

=== Joint Committees ===
Committee	Senate Chair	Senate Ranking Minority	House Chair	House Ranking Minority
Advanced Information Technology, the Internet and Cybersecurity	Michael O. Moore	Bruce E. Tarr	Tricia Farley-Bouvier	Marc T. Lombardo
Agriculture	Anne M. Gobi	Ryan C. Fattman	Paul A. Schmid, III	Susan Williams Gifford
Bonding, Capital Expenditures and State Assets	Edward J. Kennedy	Ryan C. Fattman	Michael J. Finn	David T. Vieira
Cannabis Policy	Adam Gomez	Ryan C. Fattman	Daniel M. Donahue	Donald R. Berthiaume, Jr.
Children, Families, and Persons with Disabilities	Robyn K. Kennedy	Patrick M. O'Connor	Jay D. Livingstone	Donald R. Berthiaume, Jr.
Community Development and Small Business	Pavel M. Payano	Patrick M. O'Connor	Paul McMurtry	Marcus S. Vaughn
Consumer Protection and Professional Licensure	John J. Cronin	Bruce E. Tarr	Tackey Chan	Joseph D. McKenna
Economic Development and Emerging Technologies	Barry R. Finegold	Patrick M. O'Connor	Jerald A. Parisella	David K. Muradian, Jr.
Education	Jason M. Lewis	Patrick M. O'Connor	Denise C. Garlick	Kimberly N. Ferguson
Elder Affairs	Patricia D. Jehlen	Ryan C. Fattman	Thomas M. Stanley	Hannah Kane
Election Laws	John F. Keenan	Ryan C. Fattman	Daniel J. Ryan	Paul K. Frost
Emergency Preparedness and Management	Marc R. Pacheco	Ryan C. Fattman	William J. Driscoll, Jr.	Paul K. Frost
Environment and Natural Resources	Rebecca L. Rausch	Bruce E. Tarr	Daniel Cahill	Norman J. Orrall
Financial Services	Paul R. Feeney	Bruce E. Tarr	James M. Murphy	Michael J. Soter
Health Care Financing	Cindy F. Friedman	Patrick M. O'Connor	John J. Lawn, Jr.	Hannah Kane
Higher Education	Joanne M. Comerford	Bruce E. Tarr	David M. Rogers	Kelly W. Pease
Housing	Lydia Edwards	Patrick M. O'Connor	James Arciero	David F. DeCoste
Judiciary	James B. Eldridge	Patrick M. O'Connor	Michael S. Day	Peter J. Durant
Labor and Workforce Development	Patricia D. Jehlen	Patrick M. O'Connor	Josh S. Cutler	Donald H. Wong
Mental Health, Substance Use and Recovery	John C. Velis	Patrick M. O'Connor	Adrian C. Madaro	Alyson M. Sullivan-Almeida
Municipalities and Regional Government	Jacob R. Oliveira	Bruce E. Tarr	Carole A. Fiola	Norman J. Orrall
Public Health	Julian Cyr	Patrick M. O'Connor	Marjorie C. Decker	Hannah Kane
Public Safety and Homeland Security	Walter F. Timilty	Ryan C. Fattman	Carlos González	David T. Vieira
Public Service	Michael D. Brady	Ryan C. Fattman	Kenneth I. Gordon	David F. DeCoste
Racial Equity, Civil Rights, and Inclusion	Liz Miranda	Bruce E. Tarr	Bud L. Williams	Donald H. Wong
Revenue	Susan L. Moran	Ryan C. Fattman	Mark J. Cusack	Michael J. Soter
Rules	Joan B. Lovely	Ryan C. Fattman	William C. Galvin	Donald H. Wong
State Administration and Regulatory Oversight	Nick Collins	Bruce E. Tarr	Antonio F. D. Cabral	F. Jay Barrows
Telecommunications, Utilities and Energy	Michael J. Barrett	Bruce E. Tarr	Jeffrey N. Roy	Bradley H. Jones, Jr.
Tourism, Arts and Cultural Development	Paul W. Mark	Ryan C. Fattman	Mindy Domb	Donald H. Wong
Transportation	Brendan P. Crighton	Patrick M. O'Connor	William M. Straus	Steven S. Howitt
Veterans and Federal Affairs	John C. Velis	Ryan C. Fattman	Gerard J. Cassidy	Steven George Xiarhos
Ways and Means	Michael J. Rodrigues	Patrick M. O'Connor	Aaron Michlewitz	Todd M. Smola

== Officers and officials ==
=== Senate officers ===
- Clerk: Michael D. Hurley

=== House of Representatives officers ===
- Clerk: Steven T. James

== See also ==
- 2022 Massachusetts general election
- 2022 Massachusetts gubernatorial election
- List of Massachusetts General Courts
