= Massachusetts House of Representatives' 2nd Barnstable district =

American legislative district

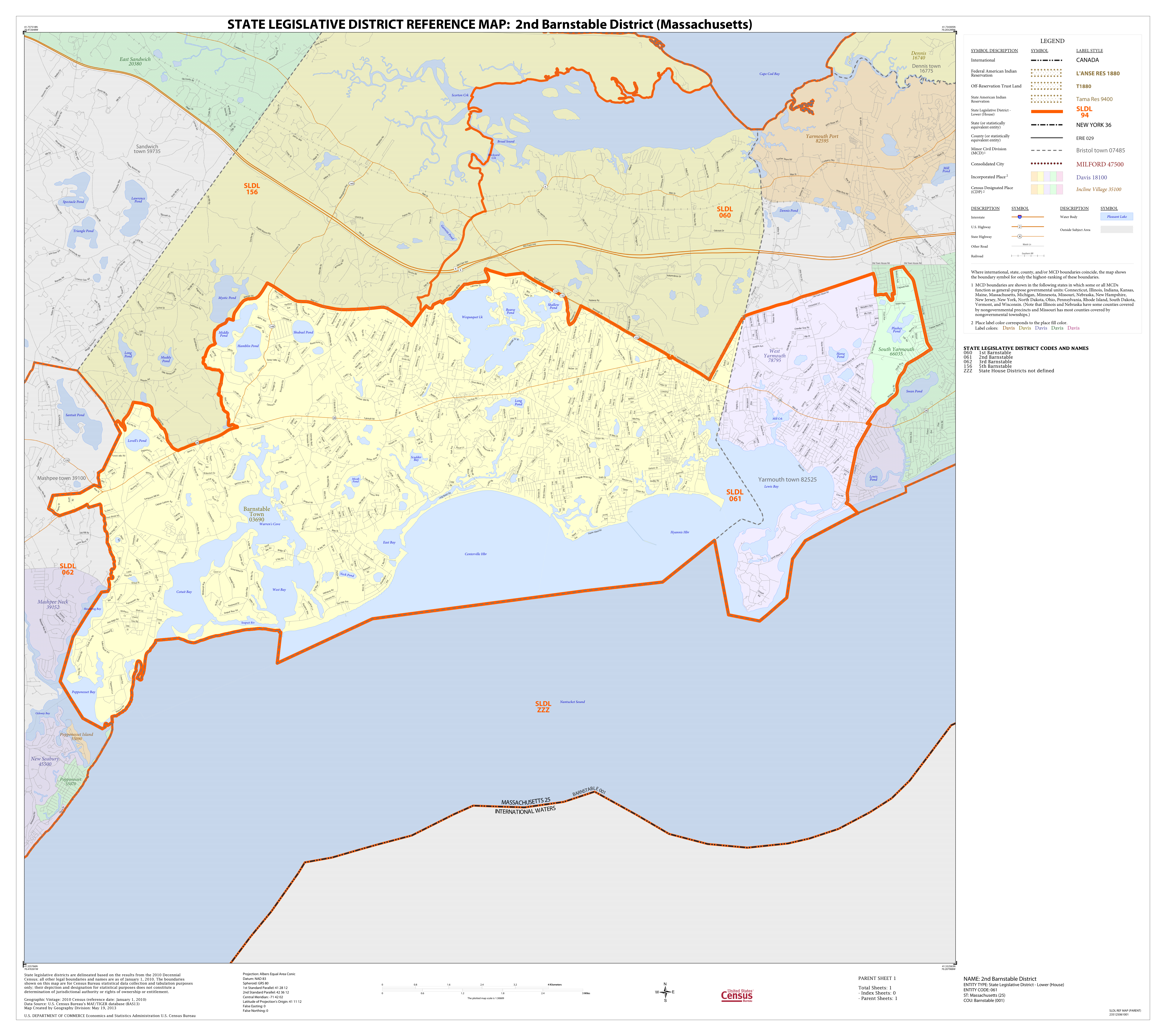
Map of Massachusetts House of Representatives' 2nd Barnstable district, based on the 2010 United States census.

Massachusetts House of Representatives' 2nd Barnstable district in the United States is one of 160 legislative districts included in the lower house of the Massachusetts General Court. It covers part of Barnstable County. Democrat Kip Diggs of Osterville has represented the district since 2021.

== Towns represented ==
The district includes the following localities:

- part of Barnstable (including Hyannis)
- part of Yarmouth

The current district geographic boundary overlaps with that of the Massachusetts Senate's Cape and Islands district.

=== Former locales ===
The district previously covered:

- Brewster, circa 1872, 1927
- Chatham, circa 1927
- Dennis, circa 1872, 1927
- Eastham, circa 1927
- Harwich, circa 1872, 1927
- Orleans, circa 1927
- Provincetown, circa 1927
- Truro, circa 1927
- Wellfleet, circa 1927

== Representatives ==
- John W. Atwood, circa 1858
- Thomas Dodge, circa 1858
- Luther Studley, circa 1858
- Nathaniel Doane, Jr, circa 1859
- James S. Howes, circa 1859
- Benjamin H. Matthews, circa 1859
- Joseph W. Rogers, circa 1888
- Erastus T. Bearse, circa 1920
- Oscar Josiah Cahoon, circa 1951
- Howard C. Cahoon, Jr., circa 1975
- Thomas K. Lynch, 1979-1985
- Peter B. Morin, 1985-1991
- John C. Klimm, 1991-1999
- Demetrius Atsalis, 1999-2013
- Brian Mannal, 2013-2017
- William L. Crocker, Jr., 2017-2020
- Kip Diggs, 2021–present

== See also ==
- List of Massachusetts House of Representatives elections
- Other Barnstable County districts of the Massachusetts House of Representatives: 1st, 3rd, 4th, 5th; Barnstable, Dukes and Nantucket
- List of Massachusetts General Courts
- List of former districts of the Massachusetts House of Representatives

== Images ==
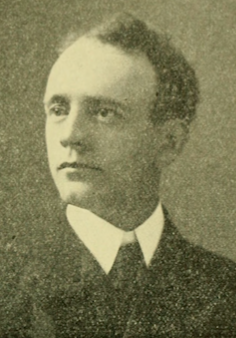
Clenric Cahoon

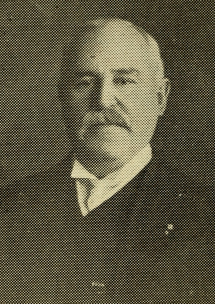
William Stetson

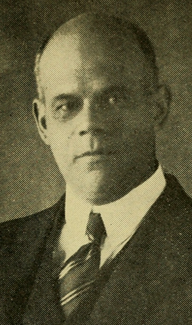
Thomas Nickerson

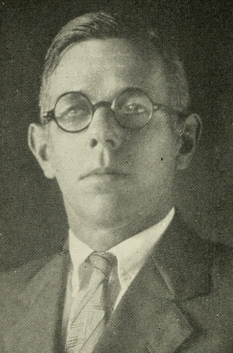
E. Hayes Small

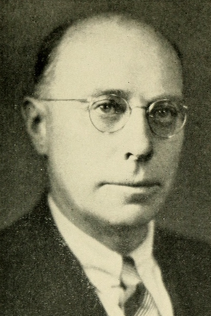
I. Grafton Howes

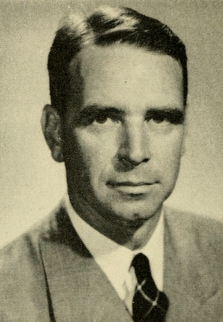
Oscar Josiah Cahoon

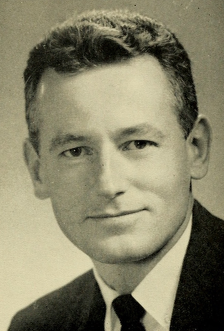
Stephen Weekes

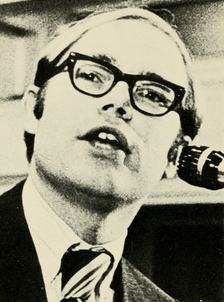
Howard Cahoon

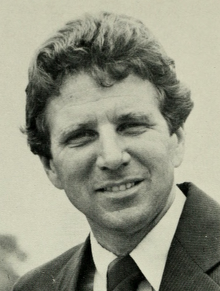
Thomas Lynch

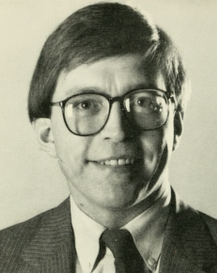
John Klimm
