= William Crocker Jr. =

American politician (born 1956/57)

William L. Crocker Jr.

Member of the Massachusetts House of Representatives from the 2nd Barnstable district
- In office January 4, 2017 – January 6, 2021
- Preceded by: Brian Mannal
- Succeeded by: Kip Diggs

Personal details
- Born: 1956 or 1957 (age 68–69) Hyannis, Massachusetts
- Party: Republican
- Spouse: Judy Crocker
- Education: University of Maine (BA)
- Website: Campaign website

William L. Crocker Jr. (born 1956 or 1957) is an American politician who formerly served as a State Representative in the Massachusetts House of Representatives representing the 2nd Barnstable District in central Cape Cod. In the House Chamber, Crocker serves on the following committees: the Joint Committee on Children, Families and Persons with Disabilities, the Joint Committee on Mental Health, Substance Use and Recovery and the Joint Committee on Tourism, Arts and Cultural Development. Before his entrance into elected office, Crocker was a broadcast journalist, a teacher within the Bristol County House of Correction, and a high school forensics coach. Crocker was inducted into the Massachusetts Speech and Debate League Hall of Fame in 2006. He lost re-election to Kip Diggs, a construction inspector and former professional welterweight boxer, on November 3, 2020.

== Biography ==
Crocker was born in 1956 or 1957. He graduated from Barnstable High School in 1975, then studied broadcasting and film at the University of Maine, graduating in 1980. From 1981 to 2011, he was a local radio announcer; then, from 2013 to 2016, he was a teacher at the Bristol County Sheriff's Office in Bristol County, Massachusetts. In 2017, he became the state representative for the 2nd Barnstable district.

In April 2020, Michael Mecenas of Hyannis launched a campaign to unseat Crocker. However, Crocker held a write-in campaign, thus securing his spot on the ballot.

== Personal life ==
As of 2020, Crocker resides in Centerville, which is part of Barnstable.

== Electoral history ==
Crocker ran unopposed in the 2016 Republican Primary, therefore automatically securing the Republican nomination.

2020 Massachusetts House of Representatives 2nd Barnstable District General Election
| Party | Candidate | Vote % | Votes |
|---|---|---|---|
| Democratic | Kip A. Diggs | 52.31% | 11,822 |
| Republican | William L. Crocker Jr. | 44.03% | 9,951 |
| Independent | Michael Mecenas | 3.66% | 828 |

2018 Massachusetts House of Representatives 2nd Barnstable District General Election
| Party | Candidate | Vote % | Votes |
|---|---|---|---|
| Republican | William L. Crocker Jr. | 52.04% | 9,753 |
| Democratic | Paul J. Cusack | 47.96% | 8,988 |

2016 Massachusetts House of Representatives 2nd Barnstable District General Election
| Party | Candidate | Vote % | Votes |
|---|---|---|---|
| Republican | William L. Crocker Jr. | 54.80% | 11,879 |
| Democratic | Aaron S. Kanzer | 45.20% | 9,799 |

== See also ==
- 2019–2020 Massachusetts legislature
