= Margaret Scarsdale =

American politician

Member of the Massachusetts House of Representatives from the 1st Middlesex district
- Incumbent
- Assumed office January 18, 2023
- Preceded by: Sheila Harrington

Personal details
- Born: Margaret R. Scarsdale
- Party: Democratic
- Website: Legislative website

Margaret R. Scarsdale is an American politician who is the member of the Massachusetts House of Representatives from the 1st Middlesex district. She was elected in the November 2022 General Election, against Republican Andrew Shepherd and Independent candidate Cathy Lundeen, following a recount, court challenge, and special legislative committee review. The election replaced former Representative Sheila Harrington, who resigned from the legislature in February, 2022 to become court magistrate in the Gardner District Court.

== See also ==
- 2023–2024 Massachusetts legislature
