= Chris Lambton =

American politician

Member-elect of the Massachusetts House of Representatives from the 1st Barnstable district
- Assuming office January 2027
- Succeeding: Chris Flanagan

Personal details
- Party: Democratic

Chris Lambton is an American politician. A member of the Democratic Party, he is the member-elect for the 1st Barnstable district of the Massachusetts House of Representatives.
