= Chris Flanagan (politician) =

American politician

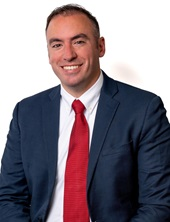
- Official portrait, 2023

Member of the Massachusetts House of Representatives from the 1st Barnstable district
- Incumbent
- Assumed office 2023
- Preceded by: Tim Whelan
- Succeeded by: Chris Lambton (elect)

Personal details
- Party: Democratic
- Children: 3

Christopher Richard Flanagan is an American politician who serves as a member of the Massachusetts House of Representatives for the 1st Barnstable district, representing Brewster, Dennis, and Yarmouth. Flanagan has represented the district since 2023.

In April 2025, he was indicted on federal charges of wire fraud and falsification of records; prosecutors allege that he misappropriated money from the Home Builders & Remodelers Association of Cape Cod when he worked for the association. Flanagan has pleaded not guilty.

== Career ==
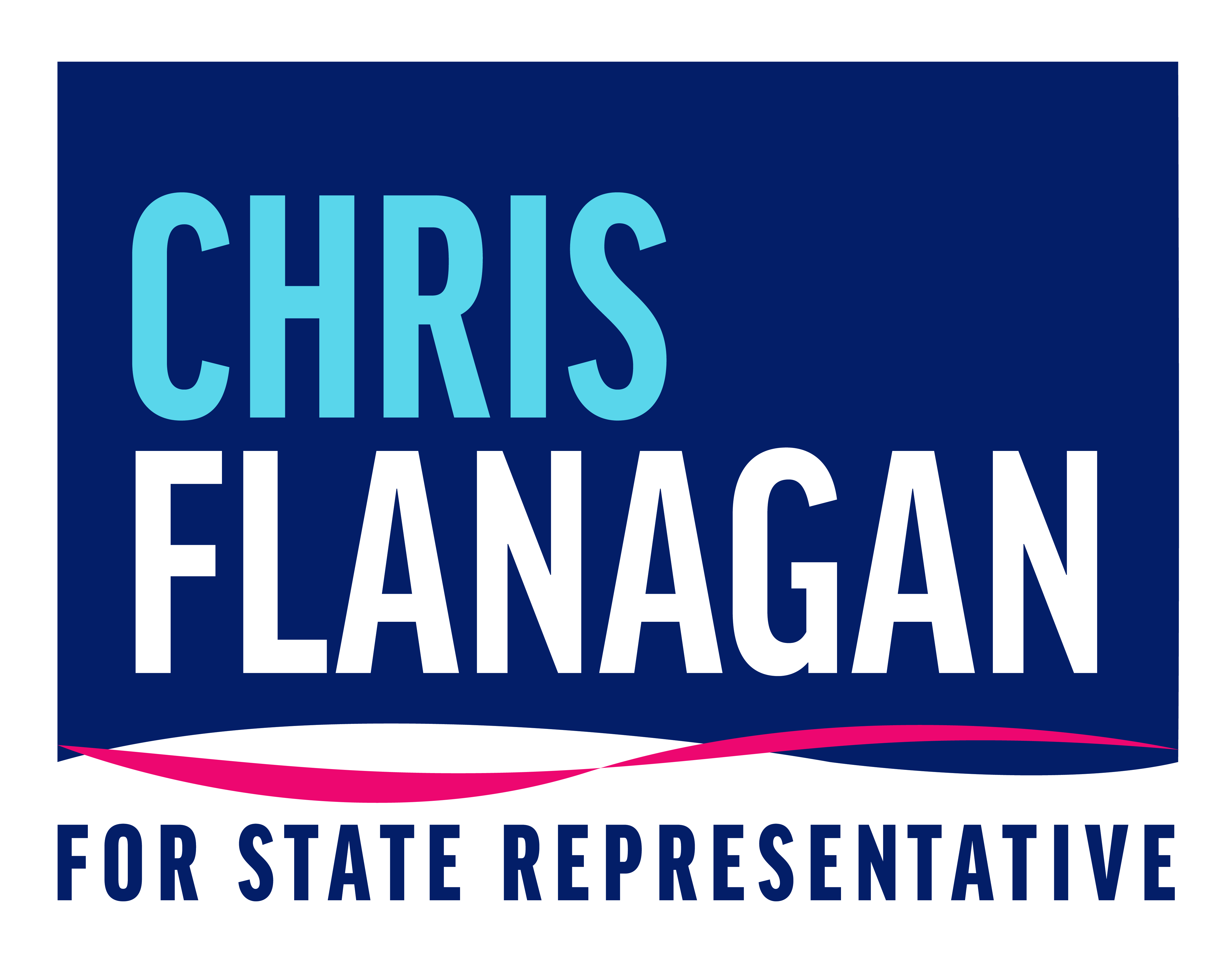
Campaign logo used during the 2022 General Election.

Flanagan was born in Easton, Massachusetts. He graduated from Emmanuel College in 2010 and received a master's degree from the Naval War College.

He served two terms on the select board of the Town of Dennis; he was elected in 2018 and re-elected in 2020, and served as chair of the board.

In 2022, Flanagan was elected as a Democrat to the Massachusetts House of Representatives from the 1st Barnstable district, which consists of the Cape Cod towns of Dennis, Yarmouth, and Brewster. He flipped a seat previously held by Republican Tim Whelan, who decided not to seek reelection to the House and instead made an unsuccessful bid for Barnstable County sheriff. After taking office in 2023, Flanagan became a member of the House Committee on Labor and Workforce Development.

In 2024, Flanagan admitted to have created a fictitious person ("Jeanne Louise") whose name was used on a campaign fliers sent to voters in 2022 on behalf of a group named "Conservatives for Dennis"; following an Office of Campaign and Political Finance investigation, Flanagan accepted responsibility for the campaign finance law violation; he paid a personal penalty of $9,000 and his campaign paid a $6,000 penalty.

From 2019 to 2024, Flanagan was an executive officer for the Home Builders & Remodelers Association of Cape Cod, a trade association. In September 2024, the association complained to authorities about Flanagan, whom they accused of misappropriation and fraud. Local authorities opened an investigation, which was later taken over by federal investigators. The existence of the investigation was publicly reported in January 2025.

In April 2025, Flanagan was indicted on five counts of wire fraud and one count of falsification of records; federal prosecutors allege that Flanagan stole $36,000 from the HBA from 2021 to 2023 via direct debit transactions, using the money to pay personal expenses, including his mortgage, credit card bills, and psychic services, as well as to fund his campaign account. Flanagan pleaded not guilty. After the indictment was unsealed, many Massachusetts political figures called upon Flanagan to resign, including Governor Maura Healey and Cape Cod state senator Julian Cyr.

== Personal life ==
Flanagan is married and has three children.

== Electoral history ==
2022 State Representative General Election: 1st Barnstable District
Party	Candidate	Votes	%
Democratic	Christopher Richard Flanagan	12,454	53.4
Republican	Tracy A. Post	10,389	44.6
Unenrolled	Abraham Kasparian, Jr.	447	1.9
Total votes		23,307	100.0

2024 State Representative General Election: 1st Barnstable District
Party	Candidate	Votes	%
Democratic	Christopher Richard Flanagan	15,607	56.5
Republican	Gerald Joseph O'Connell	11,996	43.4
Not applicable	All Others	35	0.1
Not applicable	Blanks	1,672	
Total votes		29,310	
