= Cleon Turner =

American politician

Cleon H. Turner
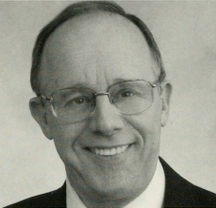
- Portrait of Cleon H. Turner

Member of the Massachusetts House of Representatives from the 1st Barnstable district
- In office January 5, 2005 – January 6, 2015
- Preceded by: Thomas N. George
- Succeeded by: Tim Whelan

Personal details
- Born: December 29, 1945 (age 80) Brockton, Massachusetts
- Party: Democratic
- Spouse: Margaret Hill
- Education: University of Southern Maine; University of Maine; Suffolk University Law School
- Profession: Lawyer

Cleon H. Turner (born December 29, 1945, in Brockton, Massachusetts) is a former state representative in Massachusetts. He represented the First Barnstable District of Brewster from 2005 to 2015. Turner graduated from Silver Lake Regional High School, earned his B.A. from the University of Southern Maine, an A.S. from the University of Maine and his J.D. from Suffolk University Law School. He was elected in 2004 and began his term in 2005. In December 2013, he announced his retirement effective January 6, 2015.
