= Massachusetts House of Representatives' 4th Barnstable district =

American legislative district

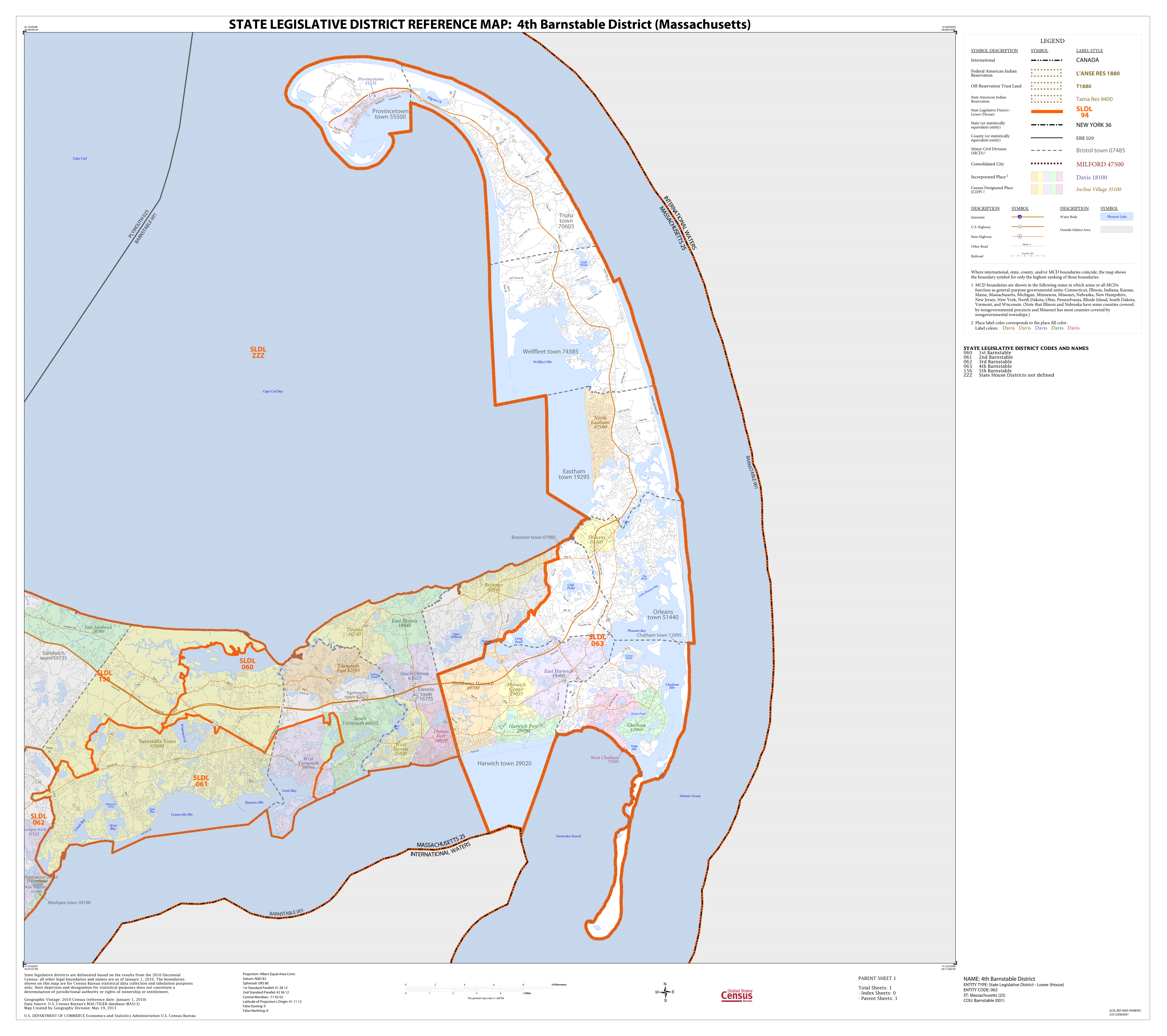
Map of Massachusetts House of Representatives' 4th Barnstable district, based on the 2010 United States census.

Massachusetts House of Representatives' 4th Barnstable district in the United States is one of 160 legislative districts included in the lower house of the Massachusetts General Court. It covers part of Barnstable County. Democrat Hadley Luddy of Orleans has represented the district since 2025.

== Towns represented ==
The district includes the following localities:

- Chatham
- Eastham
- Harwich
- Orleans
- Provincetown
- Truro
- Wellfleet

The current district geographic boundary overlaps with that of the Massachusetts Senate's Cape and Islands district.

== Representatives ==
- Nathaniel E. Atwood, circa 1858
- Thomas H. Lewis, circa 1858
- James Gifford, circa 1859
- Daniel Paine, circa 1859
- Peter L. McDowell, circa 1975
- Shirley Gomes, 1995–2007
- Sarah K. Peake, 2007-2024 (resigned)
- Hadley Luddy, 2025-present

== See also ==
- List of Massachusetts House of Representatives elections
- Other Barnstable County districts of the Massachusetts House of Representatives: 1st, 2nd, 3rd, 5th; Barnstable, Dukes and Nantucket
- List of Massachusetts General Courts
- List of former districts of the Massachusetts House of Representatives
