= Harriett Stanley =

American politician

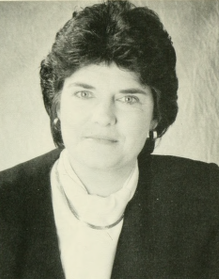

Member of the Massachusetts House of Representatives from the 2nd Essex district
- In office 1995–2013
- Preceded by: Thomas Palumbo
- Succeeded by: Lenny Mirra

Personal details
- Born: March 30, 1950 (age 76) Arlington, Virginia
- Party: Democratic
- Education: The College of William & Mary; Boston University; Harvard University
- Occupation: Investment banker Professor; Politician

Harriett L. Stanley (born March 30, 1950, in Arlington, Virginia) is an American politician who represented the 2nd Essex district in the Massachusetts House of Representatives from 1995 to 2013.

An investment banker and professor, Stanley was first elected to the House in 1994 in a defeat of Republican incumbent Thomas Palumbo.

She was named to the House Ways and Means Committee in her first term and later served as the chair of the House Health Care Committee from 2001 to 2003. She was also a member of the House Committee on Bonding, Capital Expenditures and State Assets, House Committee on Global Warming and Climate Change, House Committee on Post Audit and Oversight, and the Joint Committee on Revenue.

Stanley is the Massachusetts co-chairman of the American Legislative Exchange Council (ALEC).

She did not seek re-election in 2012.
