= Massachusetts House of Representatives' 1st Barnstable district =

American legislative district

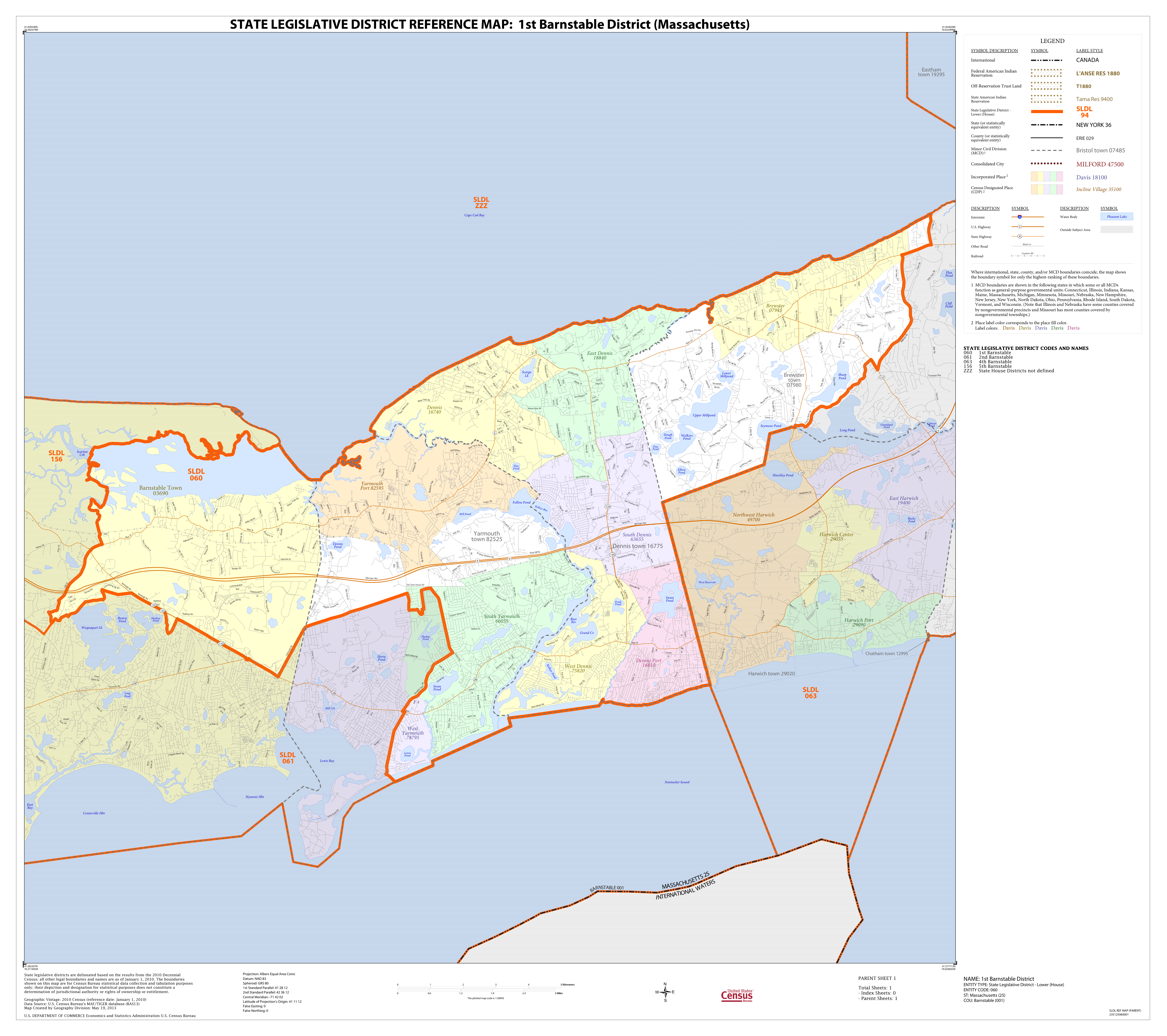
Map of Massachusetts House of Representatives' 1st Barnstable district, based on the 2010 United States census.

Massachusetts House of Representatives' 1st Barnstable district in the United States is one of 160 legislative districts included in the lower house of the Massachusetts General Court. It covers part of Barnstable County. The district is currently represented by Democrat Chris Flanagan of Dennis.

== Towns represented ==
The district includes the following localities:

- Brewster
- Dennis
- part of Yarmouth

The current district geographic boundary overlaps with that of the Massachusetts Senate's Cape and Islands district.

=== Former locales ===
The district previously covered:

- Bourne, circa 1927
- Falmouth, circa 1872, 1927
- Mashpee, circa 1927
- Sandwich, circa 1872, 1927

== Representatives ==
- Zenas D. Basset, circa 1858
- John A. Baxter, circa 1858
- Paul Wing, circa 1858
- John S. Fish, circa 1859
- Nathaniel Hinckley, circa 1859
- William Nye Jr., circa 1859
- Joshua Crowell, circa 1888
- Albert R. Eldridge, circa 1888
- Thomas Pattison, circa 1908
- George Dennis, circa 1918
- Edward Carroll Hinckley, circa 1923
- William Jones, circa 1935
- Henry Ellis, circa 1945
- Allan Francis Jones, circa 1951
- John Bowes, circa 1967

Portraits of legislators

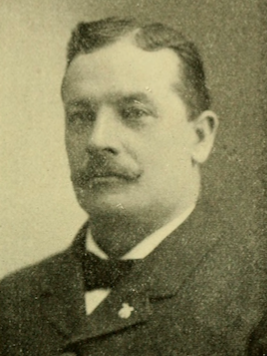
Thomas Pattison

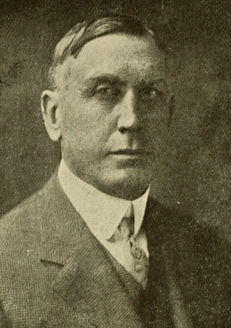
George Dennis

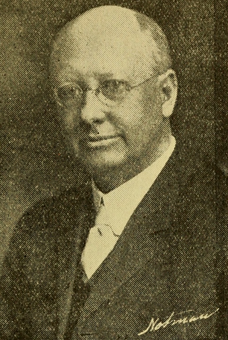
Edward Carroll Hinckley

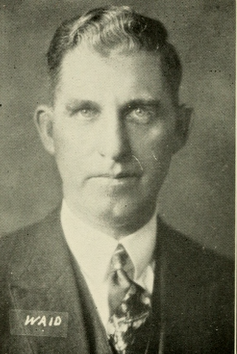
William Jones

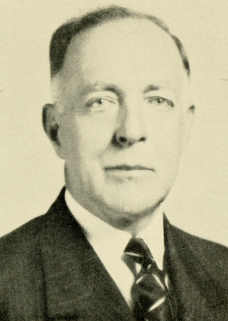
Henry Ellis

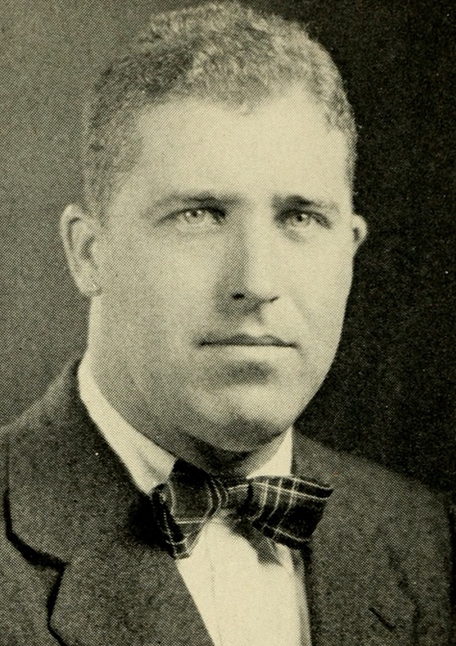
Allan Francis Jones

Member	Party	Years	Legis.	Electoral history	District towns
John J. Bowes	Republican	circa 1967– 1975	168th 169th	Re-elected in 1970. Re-elected in 1972. Retired.	1971-1975: Barnstable and Yarmouth
Bernard Wilber (Barnstable)	Republican	1975– 1977	170th	Elected in 1974. Lost re-election in 1976.	1975-1979: Barnstable and Sandwich
Thomas K. Lynch	Democratic	1977– 1977	171st	Elected in 1976. Redistricted to 2nd Barnstable district.	1975-1979: Barnstable and Sandwich
Haden G. Greenhalgh (Harwich)	Republican	1979– 1985	172nd 173rd 174th	Elected in 1978. Re-elected in 1980. Re-elected in 1982. Retired.	1981-1989: Brewster, Dennis, Harwich, and Yarmouth
Henri S. Rauschenbach (Brewster)	Republican	1985– 1988	175th 176th	Elected in 1984. Re-elected in 1986. Elected to State Senate in 1988.	1981-1989: Brewster, Dennis, Harwich, and Yarmouth
Edward B. Teague III (Yarmouth)	Republican	1989– 1997	177th 178th 179th 180th	Elected in 1988. Re-elected in 1990. Re-elected in 1992. Re-elected in 1994. Ran for U.S. House in 1996.	1989-2013: Brewster, Dennis and Yarmouth
Thomas N. George (Yarmouthport)	Republican	1997– 2005	181st 182nd 183rd 184th	Elected in 1996. Re-elected in 1998. Re-elected in 2000. Re-elected in 2002. Retired.	1989-2013: Brewster, Dennis and Yarmouth
Cleon Turner (Brewster)	Democratic	2005– January 6, 2015	185th 186th 187th 188th 189th	Elected in 2004. Re-elected in 2006. Re-elected in 2008. Re-elected in 2010. Re-elected in 2012. Retired.	1989-2013: Brewster, Dennis and Yarmouth
Cleon Turner (Brewster)	Democratic	2005– January 6, 2015	185th 186th 187th 188th 189th	Elected in 2004. Re-elected in 2006. Re-elected in 2008. Re-elected in 2010. Re-elected in 2012. Retired.	2013-2023: Brewster, Dennis and Yarmouth and parts of Barnstable
Timothy J. Whelan (Brewster)	Republican	January 6, 2015– January 4, 2023	190th 191st 191st 192nd	Elected in 2014. Re-elected in 2016. Re-elected in 2018. Re-elected in 2020. Ran for Barnstable County Sheriff in 2022.	2013-2023: Brewster, Dennis and Yarmouth and parts of Barnstable
Chris Flanagan (Dennis Port)	Democratic	January 4, 2023–	193rd 194th	Elected in 2022. Re-elected in 2024.	2023–present: Brewster, Dennis and part of Yarmouth

== See also ==
- List of Massachusetts House of Representatives elections
- Other Barnstable County districts of the Massachusetts House of Representatives: 2nd, 3rd, 4th, 5th; Barnstable, Dukes and Nantucket
- List of Massachusetts General Courts
- List of former districts of the Massachusetts House of Representatives
