= Randy Hunt (politician) =

American politician (born 1957)

Member of the Massachusetts House of Representatives from the 5th Barnstable district
- In office January 2011 – January 6, 2021
- Preceded by: Jeff Perry
- Succeeded by: Steven Xiarhos

Personal details
- Born: August 24, 1957 (age 68) El Paso, Texas, U.S.
- Party: Republican
- Spouse: Mary
- Children: 6
- Education: University of Texas at El Paso (BS)

Randy Hunt (born August 25, 1957) is an American politician and accountant who served as a member of the Massachusetts House of Representatives from 2011 to 2021, representing the 5th Barnstable district. He had previously served as a member of the Sandwich Board of Selectmen from 2003 to 2010.

== Early life and education ==
Hunt was born in El Paso, Texas. He earned a Bachelor of Science degree in accounting from the University of Texas at El Paso.

== Career ==
He entered the firm of Peat Marwick Mitchell, a predecessor of KPMG. He was promoted to senior manager in the audit practice and spent two years in the firm's executive office in New York City.

In 1989, he left KPMG to become a plant controller with a publicly traded company that manufactures infrared optical sensors and emitters used in office machinery and automobiles. In 1993, he was recruited by another publicly traded company, Aerovox, to become general manager of their EMI filter business unit. At Aerovox, he was eventually promoted to chief financial officer, working with financial institutions, investment bankers, the Securities and Exchange Commission, and the board of directors and shareholders of the company.

In 2003, Hunt established his own CPA practice in Sandwich.

=== Government and politics ===
Hunt was invited to join the Town of Sandwich's finance committee in 2001. Three years later, he won election to the town's board of selectmen and served two three-year terms. In 2010, he ran for state representative to succeed the incumbent, Jeff Davis Perry, who opted not to run for re-election in order to run for an open seat in Congress against Bill Keating. Hunt beat Democrat Lance Lambros and was sworn in as representative from the 5th Barnstable District on January 5, 2011.

Hunt has been a member of the Joint Committee on Telecommunications, Utilities, and Energy (TU&E) since 2011. In addition to TU&E, he serves on the Joint Committee on Health Care Financing and the Joint Committee on Transportation. In previous legislative sessions, he served on the Joint Committee on Elder Affairs and on the Joint Committee on Mental Health and Substance Abuse (now Mental Health, Substance Use, and Recovery).

== See also ==
- 2019–2020 Massachusetts legislature
