= Jeff Perry (politician) =

American politician

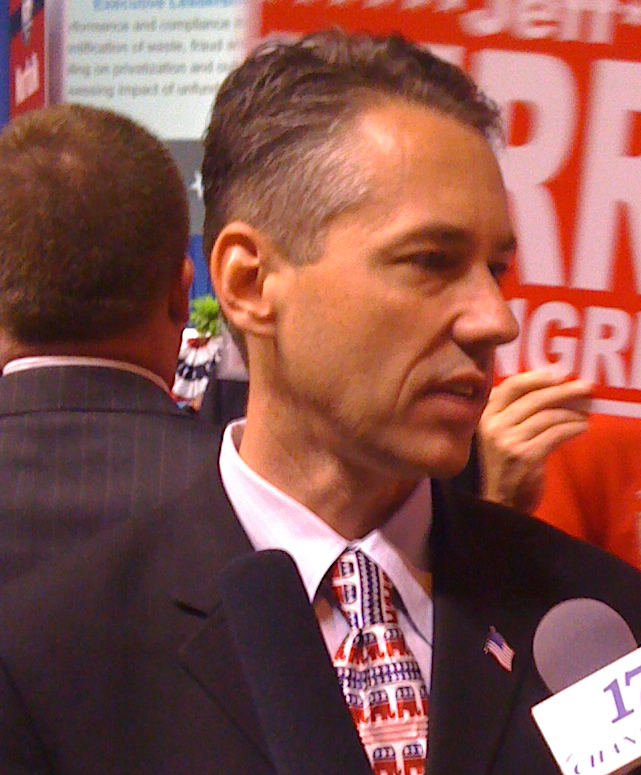

Member of the Massachusetts House of Representatives from the 5th Barnstable district
- In office January 1, 2003 – January 5, 2011
- Preceded by: District established
- Succeeded by: Randy Hunt

Personal details
- Born: January 8, 1964 (age 62) Attleboro, Massachusetts, U.S.
- Party: Republican
- Spouse(s): Lisa Perry; 1 child
- Education: Bristol Community College (A.A.); Curry College (B.A.); New England School of Law(J.D.)
- Profession: Businessman, lawyer; former policeman

Jeffrey Davis Perry (born January 8, 1964) is a former member of the Massachusetts House of Representatives who represented the 5th Barnstable District from 2003-2011. He was the Republican Party nominee for United States Congress in Massachusetts's 10th congressional district in the 2010 election, losing to Democrat Bill Keating.

== Education and early career ==
Perry has an associate's degree (A.A.) from Bristol Community College, and a Bachelor of Arts (B.A.) degree in sociology from Curry College. He completed an executive management program at the Law Enforcement Executive Center at Babson College, graduated from the Plymouth Regional Police Academy, and served for eight years as a Wareham police officer. After leaving the police force, Perry started a private investigation business.

== State representative ==
In 2002, Perry was elected as a member of the Massachusetts House of Representatives. He represented the Fifth Barnstable District, covering the town of Sandwich plus portions of Barnstable, Bourne and Mashpee. He was last reelected by a 70% to 30% margin in 2008. In 2010 he resigned to run for the U.S. House; his term ends in January 2011. He was succeeded by Republican Randy Hunt.

Perry had served on the following Legislative Committees: Joint Committee on Education; Joint Committee on Public Safety and Homeland Security; House Committee on Ways & Means; and Joint Committee on State Administration and Oversight.

== Academia ==
While serving as a State Representative, Perry attended night classes for four years at the New England School of Law, where he was recognized as "the student who has shown the greatest promise of outstanding contributions to public service." After completing his law degree there, he passed the Massachusetts Bar Examination in 2007 and worked at the firm of Flannigan and Perry, P.C., located in Hanover and Hyannis, while he continued to work in the state legislature.

Perry is an adjunct professor of criminal justice at Cape Cod Community College, and previously taught constitutional law at Bridgewater State College.

== Political positions ==
Perry is an ally of Mitt Romney, and an admirer of Ronald Reagan. He is the author of a self-published book titled, My GOP: It is Time for Republicans to Get Back to the Principles of Ronald Reagan.

While in the State House, Perry cosponsored a bill opposing a state proposal to reopen a dredge dumping site in Buzzards Bay. He has supported the efforts of Democratic Governor Deval Patrick to bring casinos to Massachusetts. Perry unsuccessfully sponsored legislation to require residency verification as a condition for receiving public benefits.

=== Public safety and law enforcement ===
Perry opposed allowing police to pull over motorists for not wearing seat belts. He has supported maintaining criminal penalties against possession of small amounts of marijuana.

Perry is a member of a special legislative commission on drugs, which has focused on such drugs as OxyContin and oxycodone.

=== Fiscal policy ===
Perry said he hopes efforts by Governor Deval Patrick to reduce earmarks will succeed, but until then "each legislator has to fight or we're going to get left out." Thus, he requested earmarks himself, such as $25,000 for the Sandwich Glass Museum, and $16 million to bring widespread broadband access to Cape Cod. He opposed using state funds for a convict's sex change operation and has supported tax credits for home heating costs.

Perry supports giving state lottery proceeds to local governments. He opposes state tax increases, calling concerns about revenue shortfalls "hysteria" and expressing concern that increasing sales taxes could cause people to avoid taxation altogether by making purchases online or by going out of state. Perry has advocated reducing the state's gasoline excise tax in July and August to stimulate the tourism industry.

=== Electoral history ===
In 2002, Perry ran against Democrat Ruth W. Provost in the general election to represent the newly created Fifth Barnstable district in the Massachusetts House of Representatives. Provost had been a three-term incumbent of the Second Plymouth district, but her district was redrawn to her disadvantage after the 2000 U.S. Census and she opted to run for election in the new district. The vote was 51% to 49% for Perry. In 2004, Perry won 66% to 34% over Democrat Garry N. Blank in the general election for the Massachusetts House of Representatives for the Fifth Barnstable district. In 2006, Perry was reelected in an uncontested election. In 2008, he received 70% of the vote to 30% for Democrat Glenn S. Pare in the race to represent the Fifth Barnstable district in the Massachusetts House of Representatives.

In 2010, Perry ran to represent the 10th Congressional District in the U.S. House of Representatives and was defeated by Norfolk County District Attorney William Keating. Keating received 132,582 votes (47 percent) while Perry received 119,829 votes (42 percent). Independents Maryanne Lewis, James Sheets and Joseph van Ness received 16,673 votes (6 percent), 10,438 votes (4 percent) and 3,075 votes (1 percent) respectively. He launched his campaign before Democratic incumbent William Delahunt announced his retirement, making this an open seat. Perry defeated Joe Malone, Robert Hayden and Raymond Kasperowicz for the GOP nomination.

== Controversies ==
=== Wareham police strip searches ===
In 2010, controversy arose about Perry's time in the early 1990s as a Wareham police sergeant, when on two separate occasions, Scott Flanagan, a subordinate police officer, conducted illegal strip searches of two teenage girls, aged 14 and 16. Perry supported Flanagan up until Flanagan entered a guilty plea. Perry said he had assumed Flanagan was innocent. Flanagan pleaded guilty in 1993 to indecent assault and civil rights violations, and subsequently was sentenced to four years in prison. Perry was named in two federal civil rights lawsuits brought against the town. The town lost one of the cases and settled the other. Perry said that although he was named as a defendant, he was never questioned and never appeared in court. Perry stated in May 2010 that, if given the chance, he would not have done anything differently: "I did what I think is good police work." Perry resigned seventeen days after Flanagan was indicted, for what Perry said were reasons unrelated to the controversy.

One of the victims, Lisa Allen, who was 14 years old at the time she was assaulted by Flanagan in 1991, has made a public statement against Perry and his role in the incident:

He [Perry] had to hear me screaming and crying. Instead of helping me, Jeff Perry denied anything happened .. Perry did not care about protecting teenaged girls in Wareham from police officer Flanagan. Jeff Perry cared only about protecting police officer Flanagan. ... It upsets me that Jeff Perry can run for Congress after what he did to me when I was 14 years old.'

Allen's father said in 2010 that he was surprised and angry that Perry is running for Congress. "There's nowhere he should run except out of town", he said.

The father of Heather Adams, the victim in the 1992 incident, however, stated in 2010 that he believed Perry was simply doing his job and that the 1992 incident should have no impact on Perry's political career. "Jeff Perry was young and handled it the best way he could ... He was worrying about his men. You have to look at everything, not just heat of the moment. Time heals all wounds. I don't have anything bad to say about him", Adams' father added.

WBZ-TV reported on the facts of the two cases in a September 2010 report: When Perry was a police sergeant in Wareham in the 1990s, an officer under his command, Scott Flanagan strip searched teenage girls. In one case, Perry was on the scene in a cranberry bog in 1991 when an officer stuck his hand in a 14-year-old girl's underwear. Perry says he didn't know what was going on at the time. In another case, Perry was not at the scene when Flanagan sexually assaulted a 16-year-old girl behind a convenience store. But later that night, Perry and Flanagan went to the girl's parents' home. Perry says he went to tell the parents about the "odd search". The parents said they interpreted the officer's visit as a warning for them to keep quiet, or risk their daughter going to jail. Perry said he was just doing good police work. He says he would not do anything differently, and does not regret his actions with what he knew at the time. Perry resigned from the department seven months afterwards. Flanagan served four years in prison. Perry visited Flanagan in prison, but says, "We believed he was not guilty until he pled guilty. So I wanted to go and confront him and listen to him so I could find out what happened." Perry calls this guilt by association, and says he is proud of his police career. He says he had no idea what Flanagan was doing, and there was no indication that he was capable of something like this.

==== Supervisor statements ====
In June 2010, former Wareham police captain Paul Cardalino told the Cape Cod Times that he had not been informed of the December 31, 1992, strip-search incident involving H. Adams immediately, and only heard about it the next day from an officer from the neighboring town of Bourne. Cardalino said that Perry should have filed a report and called in a neutral superior officer as soon as he heard that a third party had witnessed the strip search. "Once a sergeant is aware of it, especially (an incident) that might hurt the department's reputation, the report should have been done", Cardalino said. He gave Perry a positive letter of recommendation upon Perry's resignation; Cardalino says that if he had evidence that Perry witnessed the Allen strip search then Perry would have been fired.

In October 2010, former Wareham police chief Thomas A. Joyce endorsed Perry in a television commercial, saying, "Jeff Perry worked for me. He was a good cop and he was always committed to protecting the public." Perry's police file includes commendations for his actions at a fatal fire, awards from Mothers Against Drunk Driving, and a commendation for helping recover stolen items.

Joyce had passed over Perry for promotion during his tenure. In a sworn deposition, Joyce stated that Perry "had not been 100 percent truthful to me" in an incident about breaking a radar gun. He also reported that during a pre-employment background check, a former boss of Perry's had told the police department that Perry had told "a lot of bull tales ... [and] should not be trusted with a gun." Joyce also said that Perry had intentionally tripped a red light to catch drivers going through it, a practice which Joyce called "the old red light game". On Perry's resignation from the department, Joyce gave Perry a positive letter of recommendation. Joyce, who had been also named as a defendant in civil suits about the sexual assault strip-search cases, said the attacks against Perry regarding the two strip search incidents go too far.

==== Statements on bar application ====
According to newspaper and television reports, Perry's 2010 recollections of the strip search incidents differ from what was documented contemporaneously; for example, Perry said in 2010 that he notified his supervisor immediately about the December 31, 1992, incident. Records indicate, however, that Perry filed his report on the following day (January 1, 1993) and only after he had denied the girl's parents attempt to file a complaint, his Captain had been informed of the strip search by a policeman from another town, and his captain had ordered him to file the report.

In 2007 Perry filed a bar application to become a lawyer where he included the inaccurate statement about filing a police report that night. Perry included an inaccurate statement on his bar application that Lisa Allen had been arrested on the night that she had been sexually abused by Flanagan. Lisa Allen had in fact been neither arrested nor detained. These inaccuracies caused the former executive director of a state commission advocating for victims of sexual abuse to call for an investigation into whether Perry lied on his bar application.

=== Columbia State University ===
In 2010 controversy arose over a claim on Perry's 2002 campaign website that he had earned a bachelor's degree in business administration with honors from the so-called Columbia State University, an unaccredited diploma mill that shipped out phony certificates until federal agents shut it down in 1998.

In August 2010, Perry acknowledged that he had paid Columbia State University "several thousand dollars" under the impression it was an accredited institution. Perry claimed he was among those who had been conned and despite only sending a couple of "non work intensive" papers, that he thought he was getting a legitimate correspondence bachelor's degree. He later earned legitimate degrees from Curry College and New England School of Law, and said that he was "proud" of his studies.

== Personal ==
Jeff and Lisa Perry live in Sandwich. They have one child.
