= Nancy Caffyn =

American politician

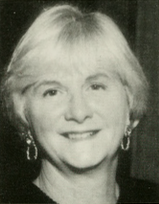

Member of the Massachusetts House of Representatives from the 3rd Barnstable district
- In office January 6, 1999 – January 5, 2001
- Preceded by: Thomas Cahir
- Succeeded by: Matthew Patrick

Mayor of South Windsor, Connecticut
- In office 1977–1979
- Preceded by: Robert J. Smith
- Succeeded by: Edward Havens

Personal details
- Born: August 21, 1934 Middletown, Connecticut
- Died: May 26, 2010 (aged 75)
- Party: Republican
- Education: Morse College

Nancy J. Jacobson Caffyn (August 21, 1934, in Middletown, Connecticut – May 26, 2010) was an American politician who served as the mayor of South Windsor, Connecticut from 1977 to 1979 as the 3rd Barnstable District representative in the Massachusetts House of Representatives from 1999 to 2001.

Caffyn grew up in East Hampton, Connecticut. Her father, Arthur Jacobson was a member of the Connecticut Senate. At the age of 21 she married United States Air Force cadet Allan Caffyn. After his service the couple moved to South Windsor, Connecticut where she served as the town's mayor.

Following her divorce, Caffyn moved to her summer home in Mashpee, Massachusetts. From 1991 to 1999 she was a member of the town's board of selectmen. In 1998, she was elected to the Massachusetts House of Representatives, succeeding five-term incumbent Thomas Cahir who ran for Barnstable County Sheriff instead. In 2000, Caffyn was voted Legislator of the Year by her colleagues. After one term in the house, Caffyn decided not to run for reelection, choosing to spend more time with her family and concentrate on her health.

Caffyn died on May 26, 2010, following a thirteen-year battle with cancer.
