= Massachusetts House of Representatives' 2nd Essex district =

American legislative district

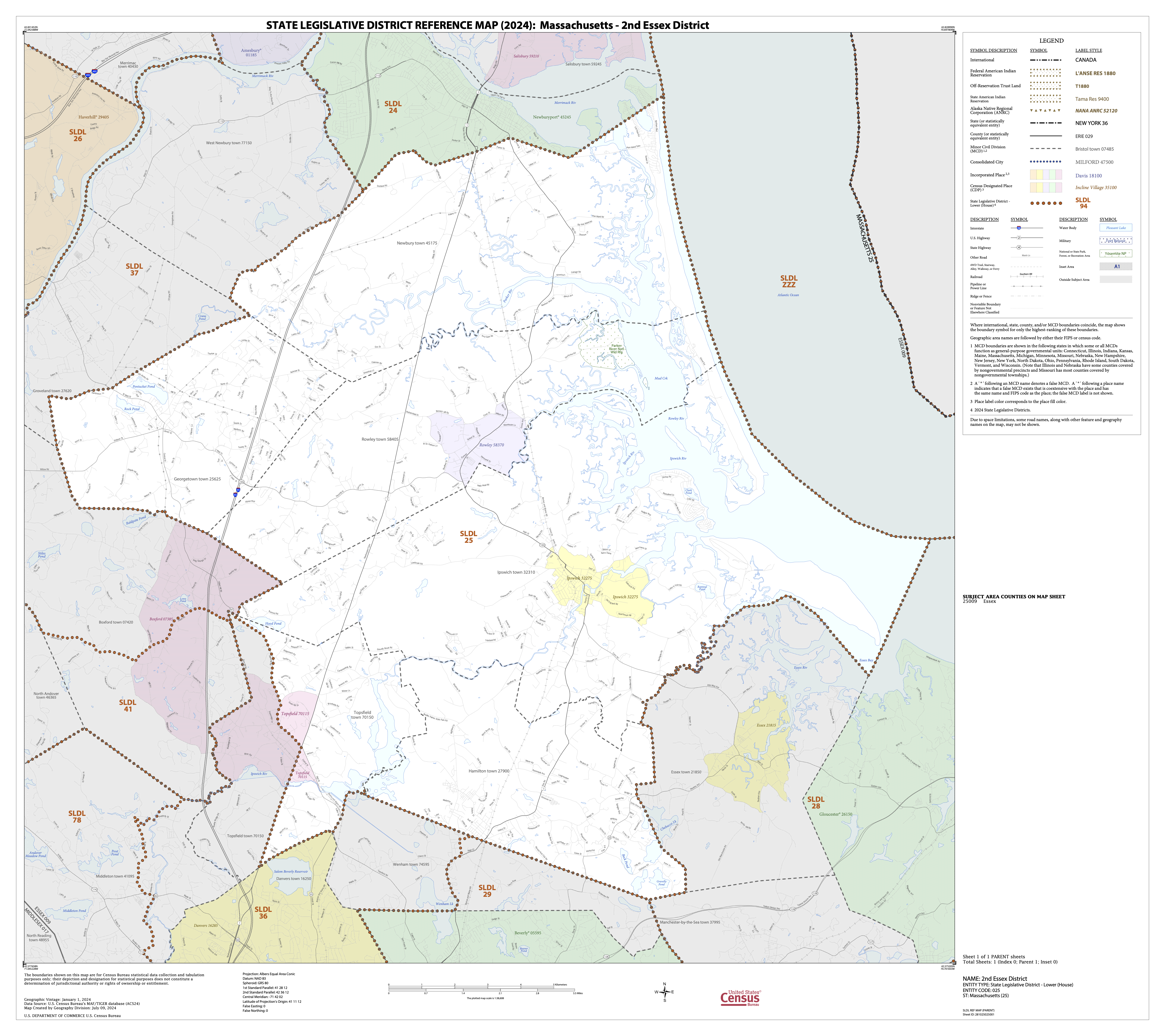
Map of Massachusetts House of Representatives' 2nd Essex district, based on the 2020 United States census.

Massachusetts House of Representatives' 2nd Essex district is one of 160 districts included in the lower house of the Massachusetts General Court. It covers part of Essex County. Democrat Kristin Kassner of Hamilton has represented the district since February 2023.

Following redistricting efforts in 2021, the 2nd Essex shifted south, engulfing several communities in the old 4th Essex District. The district now includes the towns of Georgetown, Hamilton, Ipswich, Newbury, Rowley, and part of Topsfield.

== Locales represented ==
The district includes the following localities:

- part of Topsfield
- Georgetown
- Ipswich
- Hamilton
- Rowley
- Newbury

The current district geographic boundary overlaps with those of the Massachusetts Senate's 1st Essex and Middlesex districts.

From 2013-2023, the Second Essex district included the following localities:

- Groveland
- Georgetown
- Merrimac
- Newbury
- West Newbury
- Parts of Haverhill
- Parts of Boxford

== Representatives ==
- Marcus Morton Jr., circa 1858
- William Chickering, circa 1859
- Alden Potter Jaques, circa 1888
- J. Otis Wardwell, circa 1888
- Brad Dudley Harvey, circa 1920

=== Multi-member district ===
Years	Legis.	Seat A			Seat B			Location
Years	Legis.	Member	Party	Electoral history	Member	Party	Electoral history	Location
1937–38	150th							
1939	151st							
1941–42	152nd							
1943–44	153rd							
1945–46	154th							
1947–48	155th							
1949–50	156th	Harland Burke	Republican	Redistricted from 18th Essex district. Re-elected in 1948. Re-elected in 1950.	Colin J. Cameron	Ind. Democratic	Redistricted from 1st Essex district. Re-elected in 1948.	
1951–52	157th	Harland Burke	Republican	Redistricted from 18th Essex district. Re-elected in 1948. Re-elected in 1950.	Augustus Gardner Means	Republican	Elected in 1950. Re-elected in 1952. Elected to Governor's Council in 1954.	
1953–54	158th	John F. Dolan	Republican	Elected in 1952. Re-elected in 1954. Re-elected in 1956. Re-elected in 1958. Re-elected in 1960. Re-elected in 1962.	Augustus Gardner Means	Republican	Elected in 1950. Re-elected in 1952. Elected to Governor's Council in 1954.	
1955–56	159th	John F. Dolan	Republican	Elected in 1952. Re-elected in 1954. Re-elected in 1956. Re-elected in 1958. Re-elected in 1960. Re-elected in 1962.	Barclay H. Warburton III	Republican	Elected in 1954. Re-elected in 1956. Re-elected in 1958. Resigned in 1959.	
1957–58	160th	John F. Dolan	Republican	Elected in 1952. Re-elected in 1954. Re-elected in 1956. Re-elected in 1958. Re-elected in 1960. Re-elected in 1962.	Barclay H. Warburton III	Republican	Elected in 1954. Re-elected in 1956. Re-elected in 1958. Resigned in 1959.	
1959–60	161st	John F. Dolan	Republican	Elected in 1952. Re-elected in 1954. Re-elected in 1956. Re-elected in 1958. Re-elected in 1960. Re-elected in 1962.	Barclay H. Warburton III	Republican	Elected in 1954. Re-elected in 1956. Re-elected in 1958. Resigned in 1959.	
1961–62	162nd	John F. Dolan	Republican	Elected in 1952. Re-elected in 1954. Re-elected in 1956. Re-elected in 1958. Re-elected in 1960. Re-elected in 1962.	Beatrice Corliss	Republican	Elected in 1960. Re-elected in 1962.	
1963–64	163rd	John F. Dolan	Republican	Elected in 1952. Re-elected in 1954. Re-elected in 1956. Re-elected in 1958. Re-elected in 1960. Re-elected in 1962.	Beatrice Corliss	Republican	Elected in 1960. Re-elected in 1962.	

=== Single member district, 1965–present ===
Member	Party	Years	Legis.	Electoral history	District towns
John F. Dolan	Republican	1965 – 1971	165th 166th 167th	Re-elected in 1964. Re-elected in 1966. Re-elected in 1968. Lost Republican primary in 1970.	
James Brady Moseley	Republican	1971 – 1973	168th	Elected in 1970. Ran for U.S. House in 1972.	
David J. Lane	Republican	1973 – 1979	169th 170th 171st	Elected in 1972. Re-elected in 1974. Re-elected in 1976. Retired.	
John Gray	Republican	1979 – 1985	172nd 173rd 174th 174th	Elected in 1978. Re-elected in 1980. Re-elected in 1982. Retired.	
Thomas Palumbo	Republican	1985 – 1995	175th 176th 177th 178th 179th	Elected in 1984. Re-elected in 1986. Re-elected in 1988. Re-elected in 1990. Re-elected in 1992. Lost re-election in 1994.	
Harriett Stanley	Democratic	1995 – 2013	180th 181st 182nd 183rd 184th 185th 186th 187th 188th	Elected in 1994. Re-elected in 1996. Re-elected in 1998. Re-elected in 2000. Re-elected in 2002. Re-elected in 2004. Re-elected in 2006. Re-elected in 2008. Re-elected in 2010. Retired.	
Lenny Mirra	Republican	January 5, 2013– February 3, 2023	189th 190th 191st 191st 192nd 193rd	Elected in 2012. Re-elected in 2014. Re-elected in 2016. Re-elected in 2018. Re-elected in 2020. Lost re-election in 2022 following recount.	2013–2023: Georgetown, Groveland, Merrimac, Newbury, West Newbury, and parts of Boxford and Haverhill
Lenny Mirra	Republican	January 5, 2013– February 3, 2023	189th 190th 191st 191st 192nd 193rd	Elected in 2012. Re-elected in 2014. Re-elected in 2016. Re-elected in 2018. Re-elected in 2020. Lost re-election in 2022 following recount.	2023–Present: Georgetown, Hamilton, Ipswich, Newbury, Rowley and part of Topsfield
Kristin Kassner	Democratic	February 3, 2023–present	193rd	Elected in 2022. Re-elected in 2024.	2023–Present: Georgetown, Hamilton, Ipswich, Newbury, Rowley and part of Topsfield

== See also ==
- List of Massachusetts House of Representatives elections
- Other Essex County districts of the Massachusetts House of Representatives: 1st, 3rd, 4th, 5th, 6th, 7th, 8th, 9th, 10th, 11th, 12th, 13th, 14th, 15th, 16th, 17th, 18th
- Essex County districts of the Massachusett Senate: 1st, 2nd, 3rd; 1st Essex and Middlesex; 2nd Essex and Middlesex
- List of Massachusetts General Courts
- List of former districts of the Massachusetts House of Representatives

== Images ==
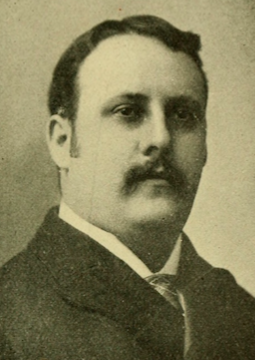
William Trudel

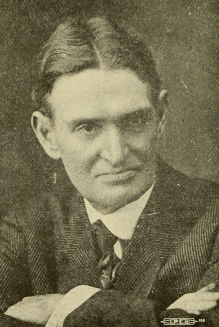
William French

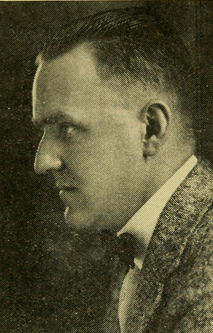
Richard McCormick

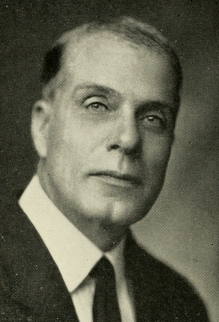
Charles Morrill

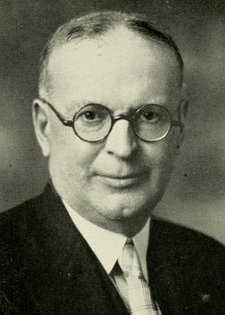
Frank Babcock

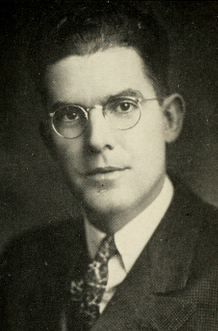
John Coddaire

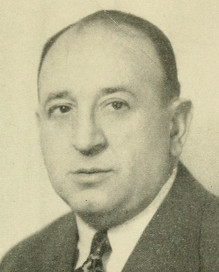
Clarence Karelitz

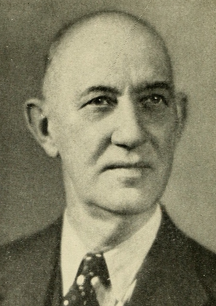
William Sears
