= Hadley Luddy =

State representative in Massachusetts

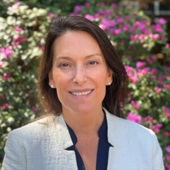

Member of the Massachusetts House of Representatives from the 4th Barnstable district
- Incumbent
- Assumed office January 1, 2025
- Preceded by: Sarah Peake

Personal details
- Born: 1969 or 1970 (age 55–56)
- Party: Democratic

Hadley Luddy is an American politician from Orleans, Massachusetts. She represents the 4th Barnstable District of the Massachusetts House of Representatives.

== Biography ==
Luddy grew up in Amherst, Massachusetts. She earned an undergraduate degree in theater from University of Massachusetts Boston, and a master's degree in education from Harvard Graduate School of Education.

== Political career ==
In 2024, Luddy ran to represent the 4th Barnstable District in the Massachusetts House of Representatives, a seat which was open after Sarah Peake announced she would not seek another term. Hadley was the only candidate on the ballot in the Democratic primary, after opponent Michael Herman withdrew, and she went on to win the general election unopposed.
