= Krista Ferrante =

American politician

Member-elect of the Massachusetts House of Representatives from the 1st Worcester district
- Assuming office January 2027
- Succeeding: Kimberly Ferguson

Personal details
- Party: Democratic

Krista Ferrante is an American politician. A member of the Democratic Party, she is the member-elect for the 1st Worcester district of the Massachusetts House of Representatives.
