= Thomas Palumbo =

American politician

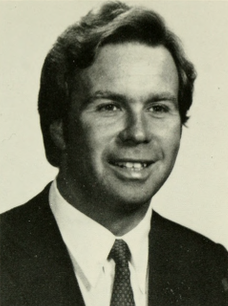

Member of the Massachusetts House of Representatives from the 2nd Essex District
- In office 1985–1995
- Preceded by: John Gray
- Succeeded by: Harriett Stanley

Personal details
- Born: June 9, 1950 Newburyport, Massachusetts
- Died: August 18, 2011 (aged 61) Salisbury, Massachusetts
- Party: Republican
- Spouse: Brenda McDonald
- Education: Temple University; Suffolk University Law School
- Occupation: Attorney; Politician

Thomas G. Palumbo (June 9, 1950 in Newburyport, Massachusetts – August 18, 2011 in Salisbury, Massachusetts) was an American politician who represented the 2nd Essex district in the Massachusetts House of Representatives from 1985 to 1995.

Palumbo was defeated by Harriett Stanley in the 1994 election. One month after his defeat, Palumbo was nominated by Governor William Weld to serve on the state Parole Board. He withdrew his nomination on January 4, 1995.
