= Massachusetts House of Representatives' 3rd Barnstable district =

American legislative district

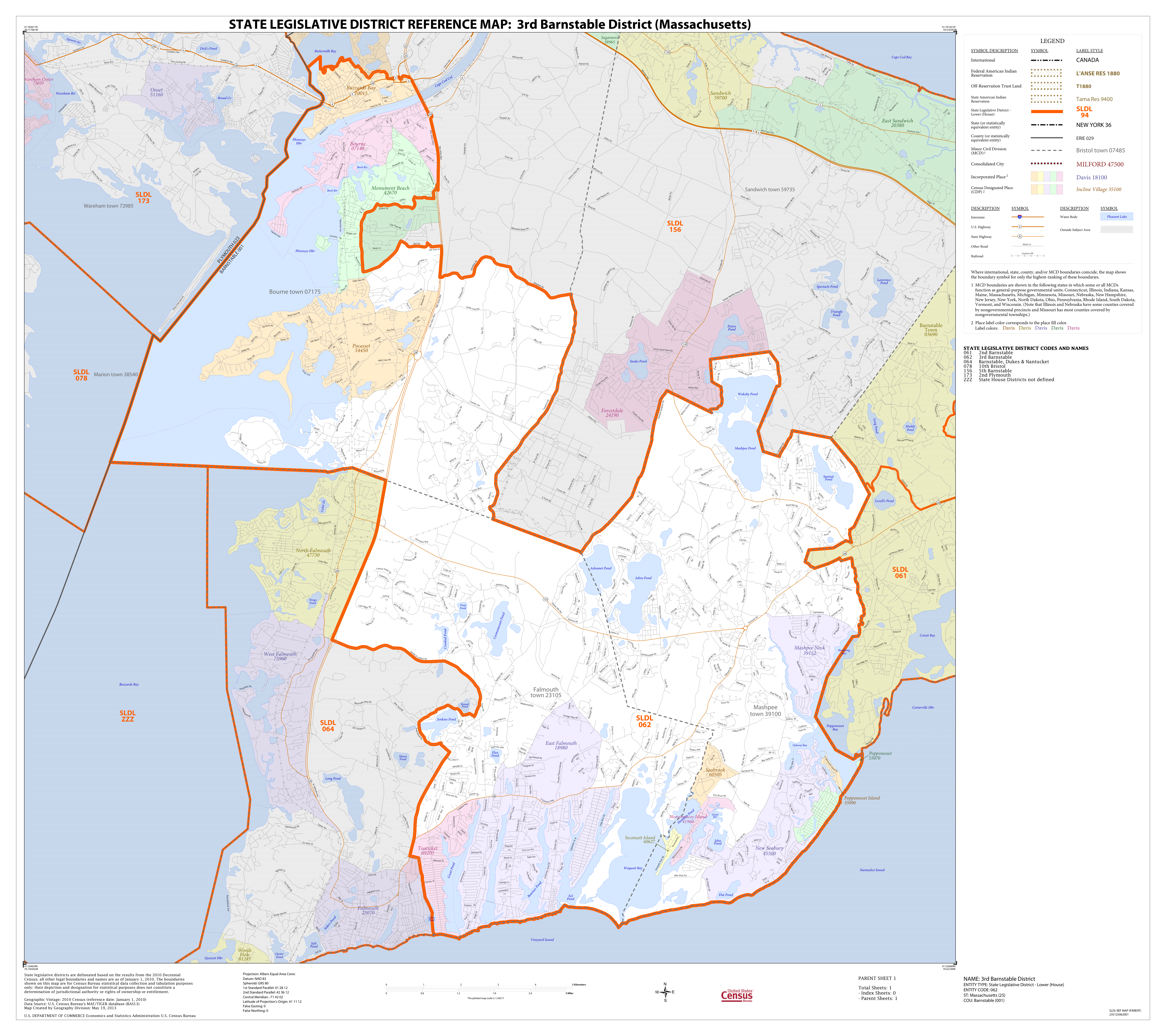
Map of Massachusetts House of Representatives' 3rd Barnstable district, based on the 2010 United States census.

Massachusetts House of Representatives' 3rd Barnstable district in the United States is one of 160 legislative districts included in the lower house of the Massachusetts General Court. It covers part of Barnstable County. Republican David Vieira of Falmouth has represented the district since 2011.

== Towns represented ==
The district includes the following localities:

- part of Bourne
- part of Falmouth
- Mashpee

The current district geographic boundary overlaps with those of the Massachusetts Senate's Plymouth and Barnstable district.

=== Former locales ===
The district previously covered:

- Chatham, circa 1872
- Orleans, circa 1872

== Representatives ==
- Ira Mayo, circa 1858
- Elijah Cobb, circa 1859
- David Conwell, circa 1888
- Jerome S. Smith, circa 1920
- Richard E. Kendall, circa 1975
- Thomas Cahir, circa 1998
- Nancy Caffyn, 1999–2001
- Matthew C. Patrick, 2001–2011
- David T. Vieira, 2011-current

== See also ==
- List of Massachusetts House of Representatives elections
- Other Barnstable County districts of the Massachusetts House of Representatives: 1st, 2nd, 4th, 5th; Barnstable, Dukes and Nantucket
- List of Massachusetts General Courts
- List of former districts of the Massachusetts House of Representatives

== Images ==
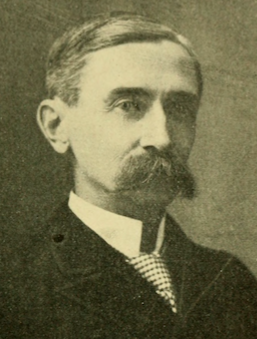
Isaac Small

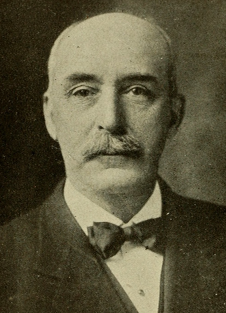
Jerome Smith

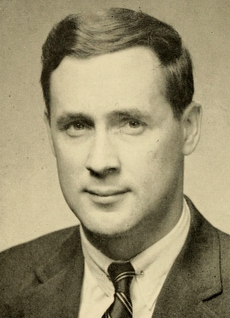
Harry Read

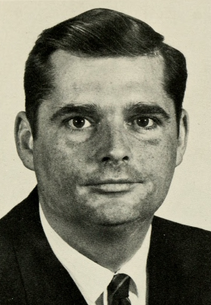
Richard Kendall

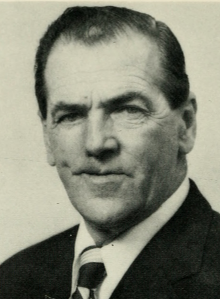
Jeremiah Cahir

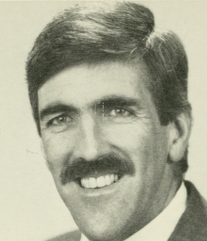
Thomas Cahir
