= Matthew Patrick (American politician) =

American politician (1952–2025)

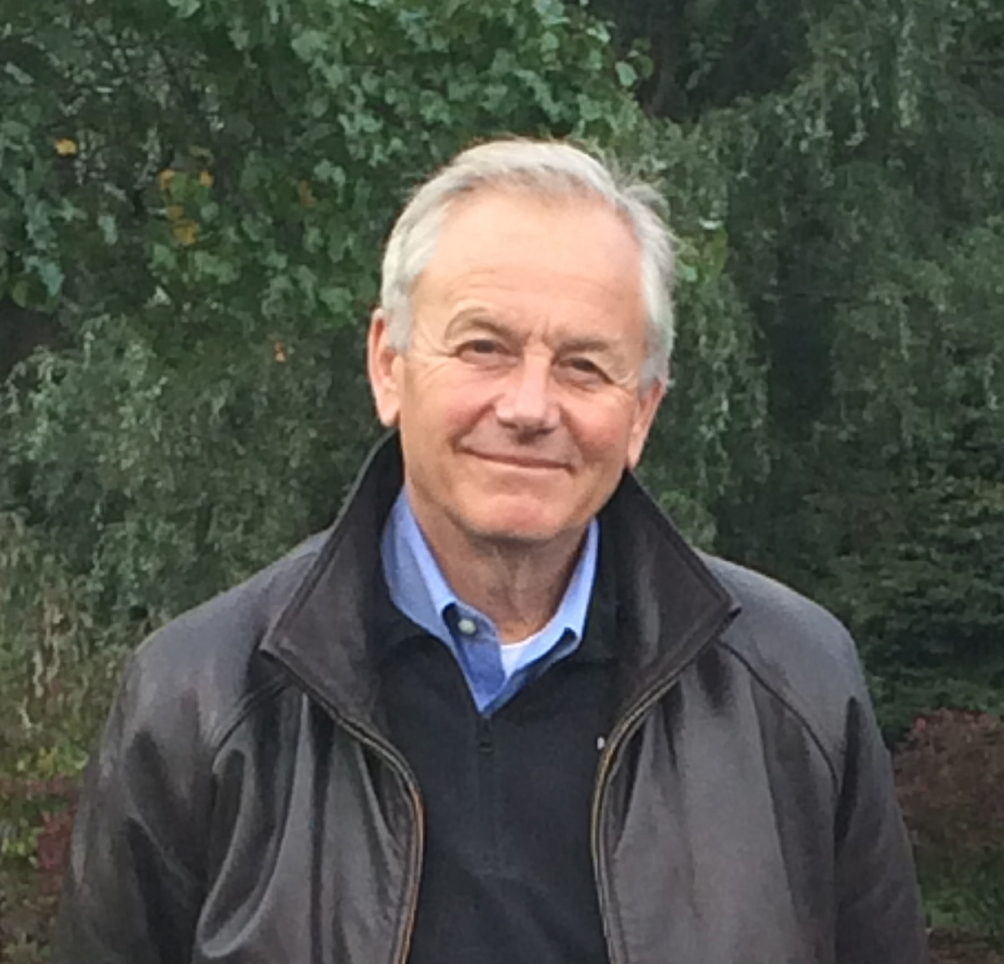
- Patrick in 2015

Member of the Massachusetts House of Representatives from the 3rd Barnstable district
- In office January 5, 2001 – January 5, 2011
- Preceded by: Nancy Caffyn
- Succeeded by: David Vieira

Personal details
- Born: April 1, 1952 New Brunswick, New Jersey, U.S.
- Died: July 19, 2025 (aged 73) Falmouth, Massachusetts, U.S.
- Party: Democratic
- Education: Upsala College
- Occupation: Politician

Matthew C. Patrick (April 1, 1952 – July 19, 2025) was an American politician who served as member of the Massachusetts House of Representatives. He represented the 3rd Barnstable District from 2001 to 2011. He was a member of the Democratic Party. During his time on Beacon Hill, he was a leading progressive voice in the Massachusetts General Court. He was unopposed for re-election in the 2006 elections, but was defeated by Falmouth Town Moderator David Vieira in the 2010 general election. Vieira had previously run against Patrick when he was first elected in 2000.

In 2014, he ran for the Plymouth and Barnstable State Senate seat that was being vacated by outgoing Senate President Therese Murray, but was defeated by State Representative Vinny deMacedo. He ran for his former State Representative seat in 2016, and, though he won the primary election against Bourne Selectman Michael A. Blanton, he was narrowly defeated by Vieira in a general election rematch.

Patrick was a Peace Corps volunteer in Ghana from 1977 to 1979.

Patrick died on July 19, 2025, at the age of 73, following a battle with cancer.
