= Shirley Gomes =

American politician (born 1940)

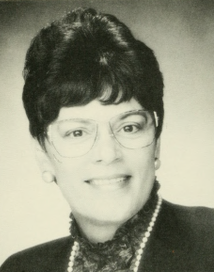

Member of the Massachusetts House of Representatives from the 4th Barnstable district
- In office 1995–2007
- Preceded by: Robert Lawless
- Succeeded by: Sarah Peake

Personal details
- Born: January 23, 1940 (age 86) Harwich, Massachusetts
- Party: Republican
- Spouse: Richard Gomes

Shirley Gomes (born January 23, 1940, in Harwich, Massachusetts) is an American politician who served as a Republican member of the Massachusetts House of Representatives from 1995 to 2007.

A member of the Board of Selectmen from 1987–1995, Gomes first ran for the Massachusetts House in 1992. She ran unopposed in the Republican primary, but lost to incumbent Robert Lawless in the general election. Lawless did not run in the following election and Gomes defeated Democratic nominee Jerry Houk 68%–24%.

Gomes did not run for reelection in 2006 and was succeeded by Sarah Peake, a Democrat from Provincetown.
