= Tim Whelan (politician) =

Massachusetts politician

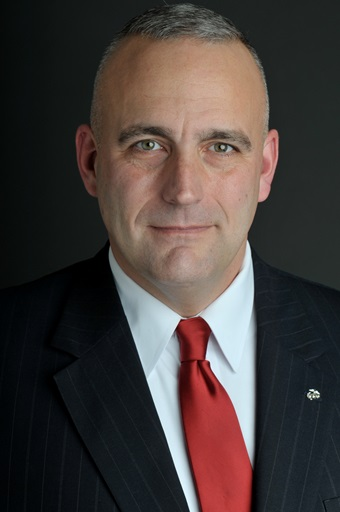

Member of the Massachusetts House of Representatives from the 1st Barnstable district
- In office January 7, 2015 – January 4, 2023
- Preceded by: Cleon Turner
- Succeeded by: Chris Flanagan

Personal details
- Born: March 18, 1968 (age 58) Worcester, Massachusetts, U.S.
- Party: Republican
- Spouse: Lisa
- Children: Maggie; Katie
- Education: Western New England University (A.S.)
- Occupation: Safety Consultant

Military service
- Branch/service: United States Marine Corps

Timothy R. Whelan is a former member of the Massachusetts House of Representatives. He was sworn in January 2015, and left office in January 2023. A resident of Brewster, Massachusetts, he was elected as a Republican to represent the 1st Barnstable district.

Whelan is a former state police sergeant.

== See also ==
- 2019–2020 Massachusetts legislature
- 2021–2022 Massachusetts legislature
