= Demetrius Atsalis =

American politician

Demetrius J. Atsalis
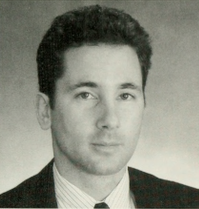
- Portrait of Demetrius J. Atsalis

Member of the Massachusetts House of Representatives from the 2nd Barnstable District district
- In office 1999–2013
- Preceded by: John C. Klimm
- Succeeded by: Brian Mannal

Personal details
- Born: March 31, 1964 (age 62) Hyannis, Massachusetts
- Party: Democratic
- Spouse: Monika
- Children: 3
- Education: Northeastern University

Demetrius J. Atsalis (born March 31, 1964, in Hyannis, Massachusetts) is a Democratic Party politician who represented the 2nd Barnstable District in the Massachusetts House of Representatives from 1999 to 2013.

His district included precincts in Barnstable and Yarmouth, Massachusetts including lands proposed by the Mashpee band of the Wampanoag people to be set aside in federal trust for the purposes of Indian gaming. Atsalis is a proponent of plans by Mashpee Chairman Cedric Cromwell to develop a broad scale Native American reservation casino resort complex to be financed by the Genting Group in his district.

He was defeated by Brian Mannal in the 2012 Democratic primary.

== Biography ==
A graduate from Barnstable High School, he earned a social studies certificate from Salem State University and a B.A. in Business Management from Northeastern University.

Before his election he served on the Hyannis Civil Executive Board and the Hyannis Waterfront Action Group and was involved with Barnstable youth baseball and soccer.

Atsalis lives in Hyannis with his wife Monika and their three children.

== Committee membership ==
- Vice-Chairman of the Committee on Election Laws
- Joint Committee on Labor and Workforce Development
- Joint Committee on Economic Development and Emerging Technologies
