= Kip Diggs =

American boxer (born 1966)

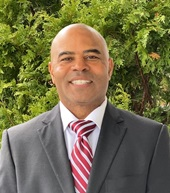

Member of the Massachusetts House of Representatives from the 2nd Barnstable district
- Incumbent
- Assumed office January 6, 2021
- Preceded by: Will Crocker

Personal details
- Born: Kip Andre Diggs; July 16, 1966 (age 60) Barnstable, Massachusetts, U.S.
- Party: Democratic

Kip Andre Diggs is an American politician and retired professional boxer. He serves as a Democratic member of the Massachusetts House of Representatives, and assumed office on January 3, 2021.

Diggs holds a record of 30–5, with three knock outs, and held North American Boxing Federation and International Boxing Organizationwelterweight titles. He fought his final match at the Cape Cod Melody Tent.

In 2020, Diggs defeated Massachusetts Representative Will Crocker in the 2020 general election. He represents the 2nd Barnstable District in the Massachusetts House of Representatives.

== See also ==
- 2021–2022 Massachusetts legislature

Achievements
Preceded by Roger Mayweather	The Ring Welterweight Champion; June 30, 1995- Vacated	Succeeded by Kevin Lueshing
