= Lenny Mirra =

American politician

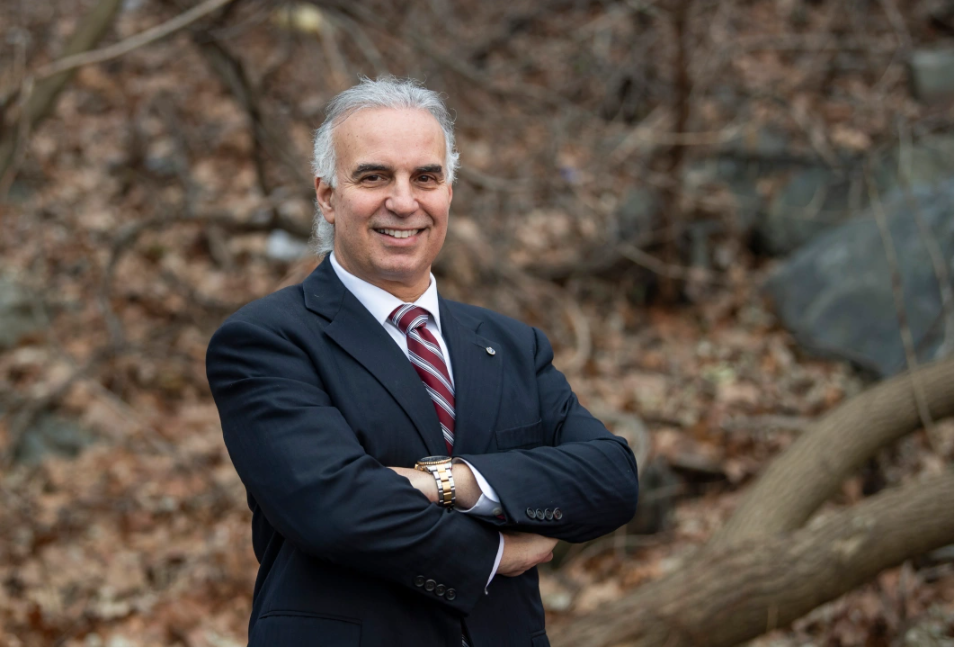

Member of the Massachusetts House of Representatives from the 2nd Essex district
- In office January 5, 2013 – February 3, 2023
- Preceded by: Harriett Stanley
- Succeeded by: Kristin Kassner

Personal details
- Born: Leonard Mirra; February 23, 1964 (age 62)
- Party: Republican
- Education: Boston College; Woburn Memorial High School
- Website: lennymirra.com

Leonard "Lenny" Mirra is an American former state legislator who was in the Massachusetts House of Representatives. He is a Georgetown resident and a member of the Republican Party.

Mirra represented the Second Essex District in the Massachusetts House of Representatives. For the majority of Mirra’s tenure, the Second Essex included the towns of Newbury, West Newbury, Groveland, Merrimac, Georgetown, precinct 2 and 3 of Boxford, Haverhill's ward 4 precinct 3, and Haverhill's ward 7 precinct 3.

== 2022 election aftermath ==
In the 2022 midterm elections, Mirra initially won his election by 10 votes. After a recount it was concluded that he lost to challenger Kristen Kassner by 1 vote. After the loss, Mirra took legal action, but the Essex County Superior Court of Massachusetts dismissed the suit claiming that the court lacked jurisdiction on the matter. Mirra's suit was also dismissed on appeal.

On January 4, 2023 the Massachusetts House of Representatives formed a special committee to review the results of the 2022 Second Essex District’s Election. As a result, Mirra served as a "hold-over" Representative. On January 31, 2023, the special committee voted 2-1, recommending to the full House of Representatives that Kristin Kassner be sworn in as the winner of the election. Mirra left office on February 3, 2023, following the swearing-in of Kristin Kassner.

== Electoral history ==
Second Essex - 2012 Republican Primary
Party	Candidate	Votes	%
Republican	Lenny Mirra	1,331	44.2
Republican	Robert H. Cronin	1,172	38.9
Republican	Gary C. Fowler	501	16.7
Write-ins	All Others	5	0.2

Second Essex - 2012 General Election
Party	Candidate	Votes	%
Republican	Lenny Mirra	12,663	52.2
Democratic	Barry P. Fogel	11,583	47.7
Write-ins	All Others	26	0.1

Second Essex - 2014 Republican Primary
Party	Candidate	Votes	%
Republican	Lenny Mirra (inc.)	1,509	78.5
Republican	Edward H. Watson	414	21.5

Second Essex - 2014 General Election
Party	Candidate	Votes	%
Republican	Lenny Mirra (inc.)	14,083	99.2
Write-ins	All others	118	0.8

Second Essex - 2016 Republican Primary
Party	Candidate	Votes	%
Republican	Lenny Mirra (inc.)	745	98.9
Write-ins	All others	8	0.1

Second Essex - 2016 General Election
Party	Candidate	Votes	%
Republican	Lenny Mirra (inc.)	19,363	99.0
Write-ins	All others	204	1.0

Second Essex - 2018 Republican Primary
Party	Candidate	Votes	%
Republican	Lenny Mirra (inc.)	2,607	97.9
Write-ins	All others	57	2.1

Second Essex - 2018 General Election
Party	Candidate	Votes	%
Republican	Lenny Mirra (inc.)	11,588	50.7
Democratic	Christina Eckert	11,264	49.3
Write-ins	All others	8	1.1

Second Essex - 2020 Republican Primary
Party	Candidate	Votes	%
Republican	Lenny Mirra (inc.)	3,008	99.3
Write-ins	All others	20	0.7

Second Essex - 2020 General Election
Party	Candidate	Votes	%
Republican	Lenny Mirra (inc.)	15,026	51.3
Democratic	Christina Eckert	14,272	48.7
Write-ins	All others	19	0.1

Second Essex - 2022 Republican Primary
Party	Candidate	Votes	%
Republican	Lenny Mirra (inc.)	2,656	99.4
Write-ins	All others	15	0.6

Second Essex - 2022 General Election (initial)
Party	Candidate	Votes	%
Republican	Lenny Mirra (inc.)	11,754	50.02
Democratic	Kristin Kassner	11,744	49.98
Write-ins	All others	11	0.0

Second Essex - 2022 General Election (amended)
Party	Candidate	Votes	%
Republican	Lenny Mirra (inc.)	11,762	49.99
Democratic	Kristin Kassner	11,763	50.01
Write-ins	All others	5	0.0

== See also ==
- 2019–2020 Massachusetts legislature
- 2021–2022 Massachusetts legislature
