= Kimberly Ferguson =

American politician

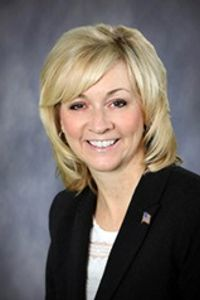

Member of the Massachusetts House of Representatives from the 1st Worcester district
- Incumbent
- Assumed office January 2011
- Preceded by: Lewis Evangelidis
- Succeeded by: Krista Ferrante (elect)

Personal details
- Party: Republican

Kimberly N. Ferguson is an American politician from Massachusetts. Ferguson is a Republican member of Massachusetts House of Representatives from the 1st Worcester district.

== Education ==
Ferguson earned a certificate in Education Leadership and Management from Fitchburg State College. Ferguson earned a Master of Science degree in Speech/Language Pathology from Worcester State College.

== Career ==
In November 2010, Ferguson won the election and became a Republican member of Massachusetts House of Representatives. Ferguson defeated Kenneth John O'Brien and Jonathan B. Long.

== Committee Assignments ==
For the 2025-26 Session, Ferguson sits on the following committees in the House:

- Ranking Minority, House Committee on Bills in the Third Reading
- Joint Committee on Agriculture and Fisheries
- Joint Committee on Telecommunications, Utilities and Energy

For the 2023-24 Session, Ferguson sat on the following committees in the House:

- Ranking Minority, House Committee on Global Warming and Climate Change
- Ranking Minority, Joint Committee on Education
- Joint Committee on Agriculture

For the 2021-22 Session, Ferguson sat on the following committees in the House:

- Joint Committee on Higher Education
- Special Joint Committee on Redistricting

For the 2019-20 Session, Ferguson sat on the following committees in the House:

- Ranking Minority, House Committee on Rules
- Ranking Minority, Joint Committee on Education
- Ranking Minority, Joint Committee on Rules
- Joint Committee on Children, Families and Persons with Disabilities

For the 2017-18 Session, Ferguson sat on the following committees in the House:

- House Committee on Personnel and Administration
- House Committee on Rules
- Joint Committee on Education
- Joint Committee on Rules

For the 2015-16 Session, Ferguson sat on the following committees in the House:

- House Committee on Ways and Means
- Joint Committee on Children, Families and Persons with Disabilities
- Joint Committee on Education
- Joint Committee on Ways and Means

For the 2011–12 and 2013-2014 Session, Ferguson sat on the following committees in the House:

- Joint Committee on Children, Families and Persons with Disabilities
- Joint Committee on Education

== Caucuses ==
Ferguson is involved in the following caucuses:

- First Assistant Minority Leader, House Republican Caucus

== Legislation ==
In 2017, Ferguson filed a bill, to make it a civil infraction to intentionally misrepresent a pet as a service animal. The proposed law would carry a fine of $500.

== Personal life ==
Ferguson is single with one child. Ferguson lives in Holden, Massachusetts.

== See also ==
- 2019–2020 Massachusetts legislature
- 2021–2022 Massachusetts legislature
