= Peter B. Morin =

American politician

Member of the Massachusetts House of Representatives from the 2nd Barnstable District
- In office 1985–1991
- Preceded by: Thomas K. Lynch
- Succeeded by: John C. Klimm

Personal details
- Born: April 2, 1955 (age 71) Boston, Massachusetts
- Party: Republican
- Education: University of Vermont '77; Boston University School of Law '81

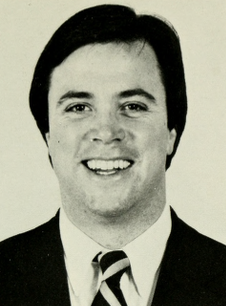
Peter Morin, 1987

Peter B. Morin is an American attorney, novelist, and politician who represented the 2nd Barnstable District in the Massachusetts House of Representatives from 1985 to 1991. He is the author of the novel Diary of a Small Fish which is loosely based on his experiences as a politician.
