= Thomas K. Lynch =

American politician

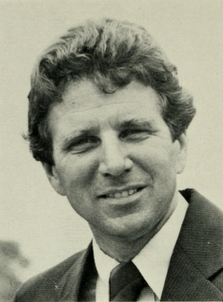
- Portrait of Thomas K. Lynch

Town Manager of Barnstable, Massachusetts
- In office 2011–2016
- Preceded by: John C. Klimm
- Succeeded by: Mark S. Ells

Member of the Massachusetts House of Representatives from the 2nd Barnstable District
- In office 1979–1985
- Preceded by: Howard C. Cahoon, Jr.
- Succeeded by: Peter B. Morin

Member of the Massachusetts House of Representatives from the 1st Barnstable District
- In office 1977–1979
- Preceded by: Bernard Wilber
- Succeeded by: Haden Greenhalgh

Personal details
- Born: April 30, 1946 (age 80) Attleboro, Massachusetts
- Party: Democratic
- Education: Boston College; Syracuse University

Thomas K. Lynch is an American municipal administrator and politician who served as a member of the Massachusetts House of Representatives and as Town Manager of Barnstable, Massachusetts.

== Early life ==
Lynch was born on April 30, 1946, in Attleboro, Massachusetts. He attended public schools in North Attleboro, Massachusetts, and graduated from Boston College and Syracuse University.

== Political career ==
From 1977 to 1985, Lynch was a member of the Massachusetts House of Representatives.

== Barnstable government ==
From 1991 to 2007, Lynch was the executive director of the Barnstable Housing Authority. In December 2007 he was named Assistant City Manager.

In September 2011, Lynch became interim City Manager after City Manager John C. Klimm was placed on leave. When Klimm's contract ended that December, Lynch took over as Acting City Manager. On May 17, 2012, the Barnstable City Council voted 9 to 3 to offer Lynch a two-year contract to become City Manager.
