= David Vieira (politician) =

American politician

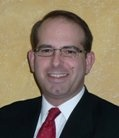

Member of the Massachusetts House of Representatives from the 3rd Barnstable district
- Incumbent
- Assumed office January 5, 2011
- Preceded by: Matthew Patrick

Personal details
- Party: Republican
- Education: Suffolk University

David T. Vieira is the current member of the Massachusetts House of Representatives for the 3rd Barnstable district. Vieira is also a Falmouth town meeting member and has been Moderator of that body since 1998.

Vieira was born in Teaticket, Massachusetts. He graduated from Falmouth High School and then studied at American University. After his junior year of high school, in 1992, he attended Massachusetts American Legion Boys State and was elected to represent Massachusetts as a Senator at American Legion Boys Nation. He later earned an MPA degree from Suffolk University. David is an Eagle Scout from Troop 42 out of East Falmouth.

== See also ==
- 2019–2020 Massachusetts legislature
- 2021–2022 Massachusetts legislature
