= John C. Klimm =

American politician (born 1955)

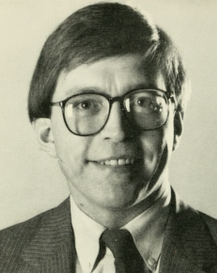
- Portrait of John C. Klimm

City Manager of Aiken, South Carolina
- In office 2015–2018
- Preceded by: Richard Pearce
- Succeeded by: Stuart Bedenbaugh

Town Administrator of Portsmouth, Rhode Island
- In office 2012–2015
- Preceded by: Robert G. Driscoll
- Succeeded by: Richard A. Rainer Jr.

Town Manager of Barnstable, Massachusetts
- In office 1999–2011
- Preceded by: James Tinsley
- Succeeded by: Thomas K. Lynch

Member of the Massachusetts House of Representatives from the 2nd Barnstable District
- In office 1991–1999
- Preceded by: Peter B. Morin
- Succeeded by: Demetrius Atsalis

Personal details
- Born: November 5, 1955 (age 70) Hyannis, Massachusetts
- Party: Democratic
- Education: Boston College; Bridgewater State University

John C. Klimm (born November 5, 1955) is an American municipal administrator and politician.

== Early life ==
Klimm was born in Hyannis, Massachusetts. He graduated from Boston College with a B.A. in Political Science and Economics.

== Political career ==
Klimm began his political career as a Barnstable Town Meeting member. In 1981, he was elected to the town's Board of Selectmen. At the age of 25, he was the youngest Selectmen in Barnstable's history. He remained on the Board until 1987, when he became Southeast Regional Director of the Massachusetts Housing Partnership. From 1991 to 1999, Klimm represented the 2nd Barnstable District in the Massachusetts House of Representatives. After leaving the House, he worked for the Cape Cod Chamber of Commerce.

== Municipal administrator ==
From 1999 to 2011, Klimm served as City Manager of Barnstable. During his tenure, Barnstable received an AAA bond rating and was awarded the Distinguished Budget Presentation Award and the Excellence in Financial Reporting Award from the Government Finance Officers Association the Smart Growth Award from the Environmental Protection Agency, and the All American City Award from the National Civic League.

On June 23, 2011, the Barnstable City Council voted 6 to 5 to end Klimm's contract early. There was no reason given for ending Klimm's contract. The agreement stated that there was "no cause for discipline, suspension, removal or termination of the city manager". He signed the agreement, stating that he was "tired of the turmoil". Per the agreement, Klimm was placed on leave on September 30, 2011 and his contract expired on December 15, 2011. However, he would be allowed to receive his salary and remain on the city's health insurance through March 2013.

On January 25, 2012, the Portsmouth Town Council chose Klimm to serve as Portsmouth's next Town Administrator. He was selected from a pool of more than 65 applicants from 22 states and Canada. He took office on February 13. In 2014, Portsmouth became only the second Rhode Island community ever to receive a AAA Bond rating from Standard & Poor's. He did not seek a new contract in 2014 and later accepted the city manager's position in Aiken, South Carolina. He resigned on February 9, 2018.

In addition to his work as Town Administrator, Klimm has also worked as an adjunct professor at Suffolk University's Sawyer Business School, where he taught courses in labor relations, state government management, managing public organizations, and administration of local government.
