= Kristin Kassner =

Member of the Massachusetts House of Representatives

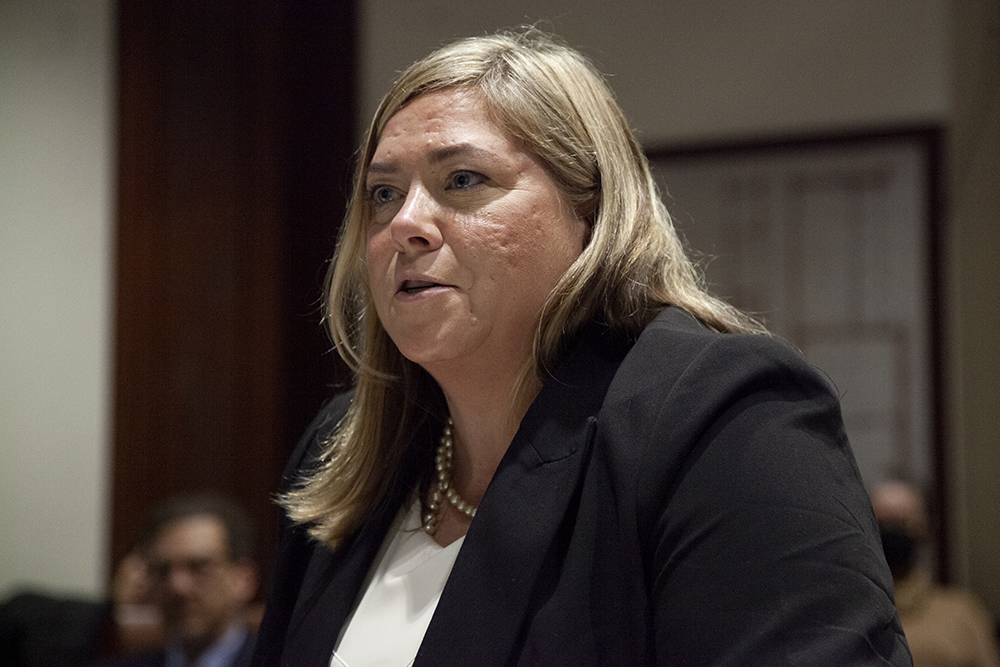

Member of the Massachusetts House of Representatives for the 2nd Essex District
- Incumbent
- Assumed office February 3, 2023
- Preceded by: Lenny Mirra

Personal details
- Born: November 22, 1978 (age 47)
- Party: Democratic
- Education: Miami University (B.A.); Tufts University (M.A.); Winchester High School

Kristin E. Kassner (born November 22, 1978) is a current member of the Massachusetts House of Representatives for the 2nd Essex District. In 2022 Kassner challenged incumbent Rep. Lenny Mirra. After the initial counting of votes, Kassner lost the election by 10 votes. However, following a hand recount, totals shifted to reflect a one-vote victory for Kassner. Following litigation, appeals, and a review by a special committee of the House of Representatives, Rep. Kassner was sworn in by Governor Maura Healey on Friday, February 3, 2023.

== Election and recount ==
After the November 8, 2022, election, incumbent Lenny Mirra was declared the winner of the 2nd Essex District by 10 votes. Kassner petitioned and filed for a hand recount in all six communities in the 2nd Essex District. After the recount, it was determined that Kassner received one more vote than Mirra.

Mirra contested the recount, alleging that count irregularities and human error led to an erroneous election tally. Mirra also contested several ballot on the basis that the intent of the voter was not properly ascertained.

After a review of Mirra’s lawsuit, the Essex County Superior Court decided that the jurisdiction of the matter rested with the House of Representatives itself. A special committee investigated Mirra’s claims and in a 2–1 committee vote, the panel recommended that the House seat Rep. Kassner. She was sworn in on February 3, 2023.

Just months after Rep. Kassner was sworn in, the Elections Division of the MA Secretary of State's office confirmed additional details of the election administration process in the town of Rowley, MA. The elections division confirmed that the Rowley election workers had been spoiling ballots that were deemed unreadable by electronic tabulators, which is against correct procedures. According to Rep. Mirra's post-recount lawsuit, Rep. Kassner successfully unspoiled 5 ballots during the Rowley recount, despite there allegedly being up to ten improperly spoiled ballots.

== Committee Assignments ==
For the 2025-26 Session, Kassner sits on the following committees in the House:

- House Committee on Ways and Means
- Joint Committee on Environment and Natural Resources
- Joint Committee on Municipalities and Regional Government
- Joint Committee on Revenue
- Joint Committee on Ways and Means
