= Sarah Peake =

American politician (born 1957)

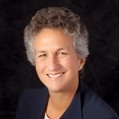

Member of the Massachusetts House of Representatives from the 4th Barnstable district
- In office January 2007 – September 22, 2024
- Preceded by: Shirley Gomes
- Succeeded by: Hadley Luddy

Member of the Provincetown Board of Selectmen
- In office May 10, 2002 – 2007

Member of the Provincetown Charter Enforcement Commission
- In office 1994–2002

Personal details
- Born: October 4, 1957 (age 69)
- Party: Democratic
- Spouse: Lynn Mogell
- Education: Colgate University (B.A.); Pace University School of Law (J.D.)
- Website: sarahpeake.org

Sarah K. Peake is an American politician from the Commonwealth of Massachusetts. A Democrat, she served in the Massachusetts House of Representatives from 2007 to 2024. She represented the Fourth Barnstable district, a Cape Cod district that includes her hometown of Provincetown. She previously served on the Provincetown Board of Selectmen.

Peake earned an A.B. from Colgate University and a Juris Doctor from Pace University School of Law.

Elected to the Provincetown Board of Selectmen in 2002, she first ran for state representative in 2004, facing Republican incumbent Shirley Gomes. Gomes, running for a sixth term, defeated Peake by 55 percent to 42 percent. When Gomes decided against seeking re-election in 2006, Peake once again ran for the seat. She won the Democratic primary handily against two opponents. In the general election, she faced Republican Aaron Maloy and won by 56 percent to 44 percent. She took office the following January. Seeking a second term in November 2008, she faced former Harwich selectman and Republican nominee Don Howell. She won easily, defeating Howell by 68% to 32%. In 2010, she overcame Orleans selectman and Republican nominee David Dunford, winning 64% of the vote.

In the legislature, she served as the Vice-Chair of the Joint Committee on Tourism, Arts and Cultural Development, as well as a member of the House Committee on Post Audit and Oversight and the House Committee on Bonding, Capital Expenditures and State Assets.

Peake resigned from the Massachusetts House in September 2024 in order to take a position in the administration of Governor Maura Healey.

Peake is married to Lynn Mogell. Several of her campaigns have won the support of the Gay & Lesbian Victory Fund.

== See also ==
- 2019–2020 Massachusetts legislature
- 2021–2022 Massachusetts legislature
