= Steven Xiarhos =

American politician (born 1958)

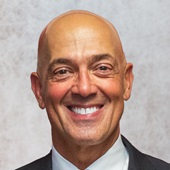

Member of the Massachusetts House of Representatives from the 5th Barnstable district
- Incumbent
- Assumed office January 6, 2021
- Preceded by: Randy Hunt

Personal details
- Born: December 8, 1958 (age 67) New Bedford, Massachusetts, U.S.
- Party: Republican
- Education: Cape Cod Community College (AS); Northeastern University (BS); Anna Maria College (MS)

Steven G. Xiarhos (/ɛɡzˈɑːroʊs/; born December 8, 1958) is an American politician and retired law enforcement officer. A member of the Republican Party, Xiarhos serves as a member of the Massachusetts House of Representatives from the 5th Barnstable district. Elected in November 2020, he assumed office on January 6, 2021.

== Early life and education ==
Xiarhos was born and raised in New Bedford, Massachusetts. He is Greek American.

He earned an Associate of Science in criminal justice and safety studies from Cape Cod Community College, a Bachelor of Science in criminal justice and law enforcement administration from Northeastern University, and a Master of Science in criminal justice and law enforcement administration from Anna Maria College.

== Career ==
Xiarhos worked as a police officer in Yarmouth, Massachusetts from 1979 to 2019, retiring as deputy chief. During his career, Xiarhos also worked as a school resource officer, detective, and patrol sergeant. Xiarhos has also been a member of the board of directors of the Massachusetts Iraq and Afghanistan Fallen Heroes Memorial Fund. Xiarhos was elected to the Massachusetts House of Representatives in November 2020 and assumed office on January 6, 2021. In the House, Xiarhos is the ranking member of the State Administration and Regulatory Oversight Joint Committee and Veterans and Federal Affairs Joint Committee.

== Personal life ==
Xiarhos and his first wife, Lisa, had four children, the oldest was son Nicholas Xiarhos. Nicholas died in Afghanistan while serving in the United States Marine Corps.
