= Sheila Harrington =

Massachusetts state representative

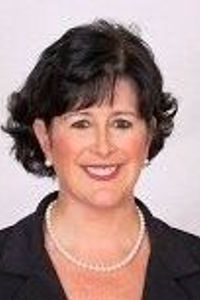

Member of the Massachusetts House of Representatives from the 1st Middlesex district
- In office January 5, 2011 – February 16, 2022
- Preceded by: Robert Hargraves
- Succeeded by: Margaret Scarsdale

Personal details
- Born: September 8, 1960 (age 65) Salem, Massachusetts
- Party: Republican
- Spouse: Steve Harrington
- Children: 3
- Education: Providence College (AB); New England Law Boston (JD)
- Profession: Attorney
- Website: Government website; Official website; Business website

Sheila Curran Harrington (born September 8, 1960) is an American politician and attorney. She represented the 1st Middlesex district in the Massachusetts House of Representatives from 2011 until February 2022, when she resigned to take up the position of Clerk Magistrate of the Gardner District Court. She is a member of the Republican party.

Her district included the towns of Groton, Dunstable, Pepperell, Townsend, Ashby and a precinct in Ayer and Devens. She served as Ranking Member on the Judiciary Committee and as a member of both the Committee on Rules and the House Committee on Personnel and Administration. She had previously served as the Ranking Member on the House Post Audit and Oversight Committee and as a Member of the Veterans and Federal Affairs Committee.

== Early life and education ==
Sheila Harrington was born in Salem, Massachusetts and grew up in Danvers, Massachusetts. She attended high school in Peabody at Bishop Fenwick High School She then attended Providence College and earned a Bachelor of Arts in Social Work in 1982. Following college, she attended the New England School of Law and was admitted to the Massachusetts Bar in 1986.

== Career ==
Sheila has been a practicing attorney in Massachusetts for over 30 years. She continues to have a law practice in Groton, Massachusetts along with two other attorneys.

One of Harrington's most notable positions is her stance on Transgender rights. In an op-ed from the Lowell Sun she documented how she came to change her position from opposition to support of transgender rights., how after "passionately protesting a bill on the Massachusetts House Floor", she came to realize, that was wrong in her own mind.

In an op-ed from the Lowell Sun, Harrington described how she came to change her position from opposition to support of transgender rights.

== Electoral history ==
2010 Massachusetts House of Representatives General Election, 1st Middlesex District
Party	Candidate	Votes	%
Republican	Sheila Harrington	10,378	62.5
Democrat	Jesse Reich	6,222	38.5

2012 Massachusetts House of Representatives General Election, 1st Middlesex District
Party	Candidate	Votes	%
Republican	Sheila Harrington	17,592	100
Unopposed	N/A	N/A	N/A

2014 Massachusetts House of Representatives General Election, 1st Middlesex District
Party	Candidate	Votes	%
Republican	Sheila Harrington	9,958	64.3
Democrat	Gene Rauhala	5,530	35.7

2016 Massachusetts House of Representatives General Election, 1st Middlesex District
Party	Candidate	Votes	%
Republican	Sheila Harrington	14,984	65.2
Democrat	Matthew T. Meneghini	8,003	34.8

2018 Massachusetts House of Representatives General Election, 1st Middlesex District
Party	Candidate	Votes	%
Republican	Sheila Harrington	15,340	100
Unopposed	N/A	N/A	N/A

2020 Massachusetts House of Representatives General Election, 1st Middlesex District
Party	Candidate	Votes	%
Republican	Sheila Harrington	13,203	51.5
Democrat	Deborah Busser	12,407	48.4

== See also ==
- 2019–2020 Massachusetts legislature
- 2021–2022 Massachusetts legislature
