= Brian Mannal =

American politician, attorney, and artist

Member of the Massachusetts House of Representatives

Brian Mannal is a former American politician, attorney, and artist from the Commonwealth of Massachusetts. Mannal was a member of the 188th and 189th General Court of the Commonwealth of Massachusetts state legislature, representing the "Second Barnstable District" in the Massachusetts House of Representatives. The Second Barnstable District is located on Cape Cod, and includes Barnstable Precincts 2-10 & 13 and Yarmouth Precincts 5 & 6. Mannal is a member of the Democratic Party. He retired from politics in 2016.
