= Massachusetts House of Representatives' 5th Barnstable district =

American legislative district

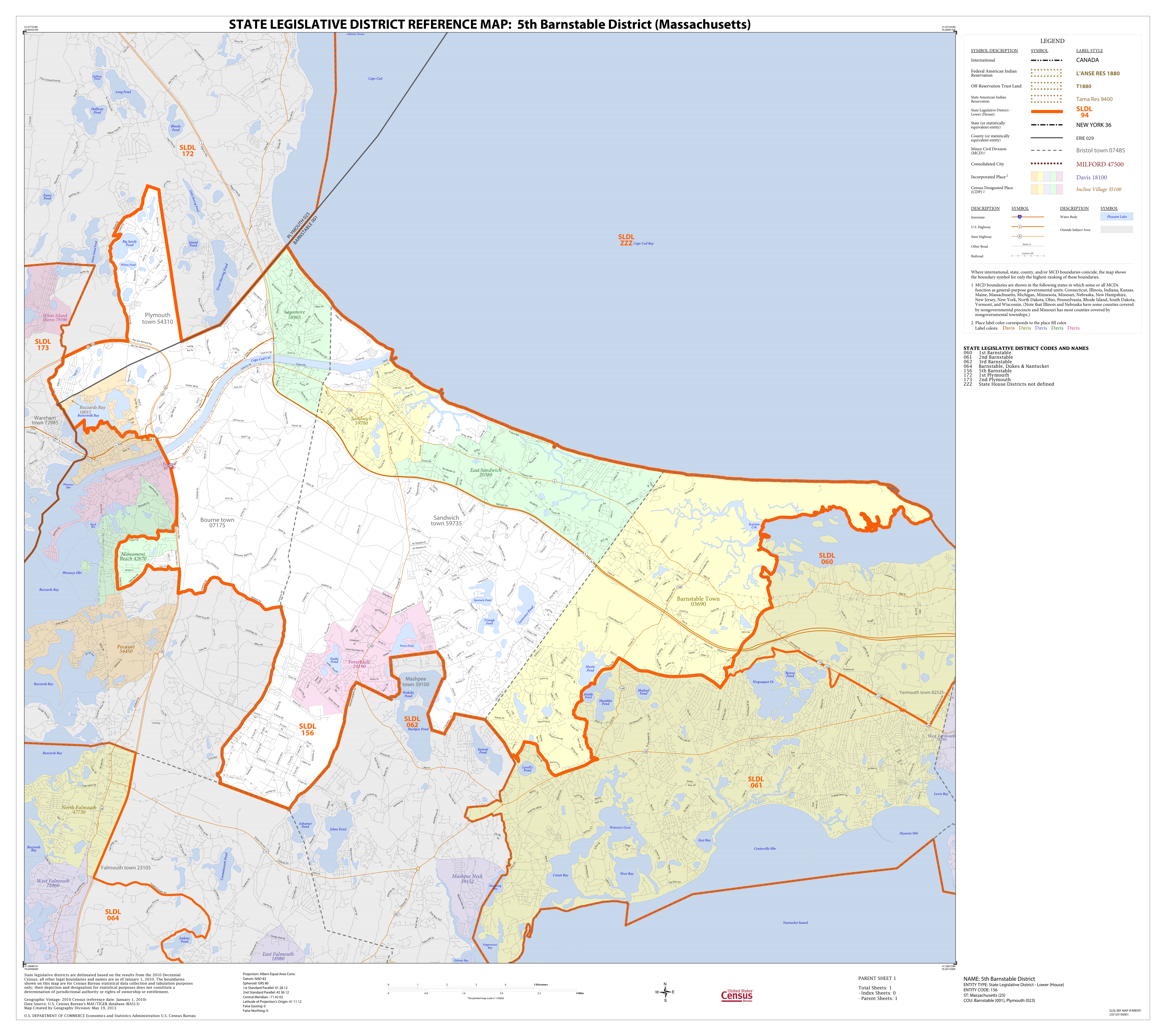
Map of Massachusetts House of Representatives' 5th Barnstable district, based on the 2010 United States census.

Massachusetts House of Representatives' 5th Barnstable district in the United States is one of 160 legislative districts included in the lower house of the Massachusetts General Court. It covers parts of Barnstable County and Plymouth County. Since 2021, Steven Xiarhos of the Republican Party has represented the district.

== Towns represented ==
The district includes the following localities:

- part of Barnstable
- part of Bourne
- Sandwich

The current district geographic boundary overlaps with those of the Massachusetts Senate's Cape and Islands and Plymouth and Barnstable districts.

== Representatives ==
- Jeffrey Davis Perry
- Randy Hunt
- Steven Xiarhos

== See also ==
- List of Massachusetts House of Representatives elections
- List of Massachusetts General Courts
- List of former districts of the Massachusetts House of Representatives
