= Senator Creedon =

Senator Creedon may refer to:

- Michael C. Creedon (born 1946), Massachusetts State Senate
- Robert S. Creedon Jr. (born 1942), Massachusetts State Senate
