= Michelle DuBois =

American politician

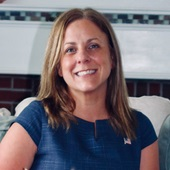

Member of the Massachusetts House of Representatives from the 10th Plymouth district
- Incumbent
- Assumed office January 7, 2015
- Preceded by: Christine Canavan

Member of the Brockton City Council from Ward 6
- In office 2006–2015
- Preceded by: Donna M. Daley
- Succeeded by: Jack Lally

Personal details
- Born: April 14, 1973 (age 53) Brockton, Massachusetts, U.S.
- Party: Democratic

Michelle M. DuBois (born April 14, 1973) is an American politician serving as a Democratic member of the Massachusetts House of Representatives. She was elected in November 2014 to represent the 10th Plymouth District (West Bridgewater, the east side of Brockton, and Precinct 1 of East Bridgewater) and was sworn in on January 7, 2015. Rep. DuBois was re-elected to a second term on November 8, 2016, after running uncontested. Rep DuBois won her third term in 2018 against John F. Cruz and won her fourth election in 2020 against Jack Lally .

In late March 2017, Rep. DuBois worked to compromise a supposed U.S. Immigration and Customs Enforcement (ICE) a raid in Brockton, Massachusetts by posting a warning on Facebook.

In 2018 she called for a sign at the Massachusetts State House honoring General Joseph Hooker to be removed, stating that his name was a "double entendre" that was "tone deaf" and “patriarchal”.

== Committees ==
Rep. DuBois is currently part of the following committees:

- Joint Committee on Mental Health, Substance Use and Recovery, Vice Chair
- House Committee on Steering, Policy, and Scheduling
- Joint Committee on Municipalities and Regional Government
- Joint Committee on Elder Affairs

== Election history ==
Massachusetts House of Representatives 10th Plymouth District, 2014 Democratic Primary
Party	Candidate	Votes	%
Democratic	Michelle DuBois	1,601	58.1
Democratic	Paul Beckner	581	21.1
Democratic	Peggy Curtis	573	20.8
Total votes		2,755	100

Massachusetts House of Representatives 10th Plymouth District, 2014
Party	Candidate	Votes	%
Democratic	Michelle DuBois	5,684	50.7
Republican	John F. Cruz	5,233	46.7
Independent	Tyler Prescott	292	2.6
Total votes		11,209	100

Massachusetts House of Representatives 10th Plymouth District, 2016
Party	Candidate	Votes	%
Democratic	Michelle DuBois	13,945	99.2
	All Others	114	0.8
Total votes		18,918	100

Massachusetts House of Representatives 10th Plymouth District, 2018
Party	Candidate	Votes	%
Democratic	Michelle DuBois	7,983	56.4
Republican	John F. Cruz	6,161	43.6
	All Others	2	0.0
Total votes		14,146	100

Massachusetts House of Representatives 10th Plymouth District, 2020
Party	Candidate	Votes	%
Democratic	Michelle DuBois	14,516	98.5
	All Others	217	1.5
Total votes		14,516	100

== See also ==
- 2019–2020 Massachusetts legislature
- 2021–2022 Massachusetts legislature
