= Thomas P. Kennedy =

American politician (1951–2015)

Thomas Kennedy
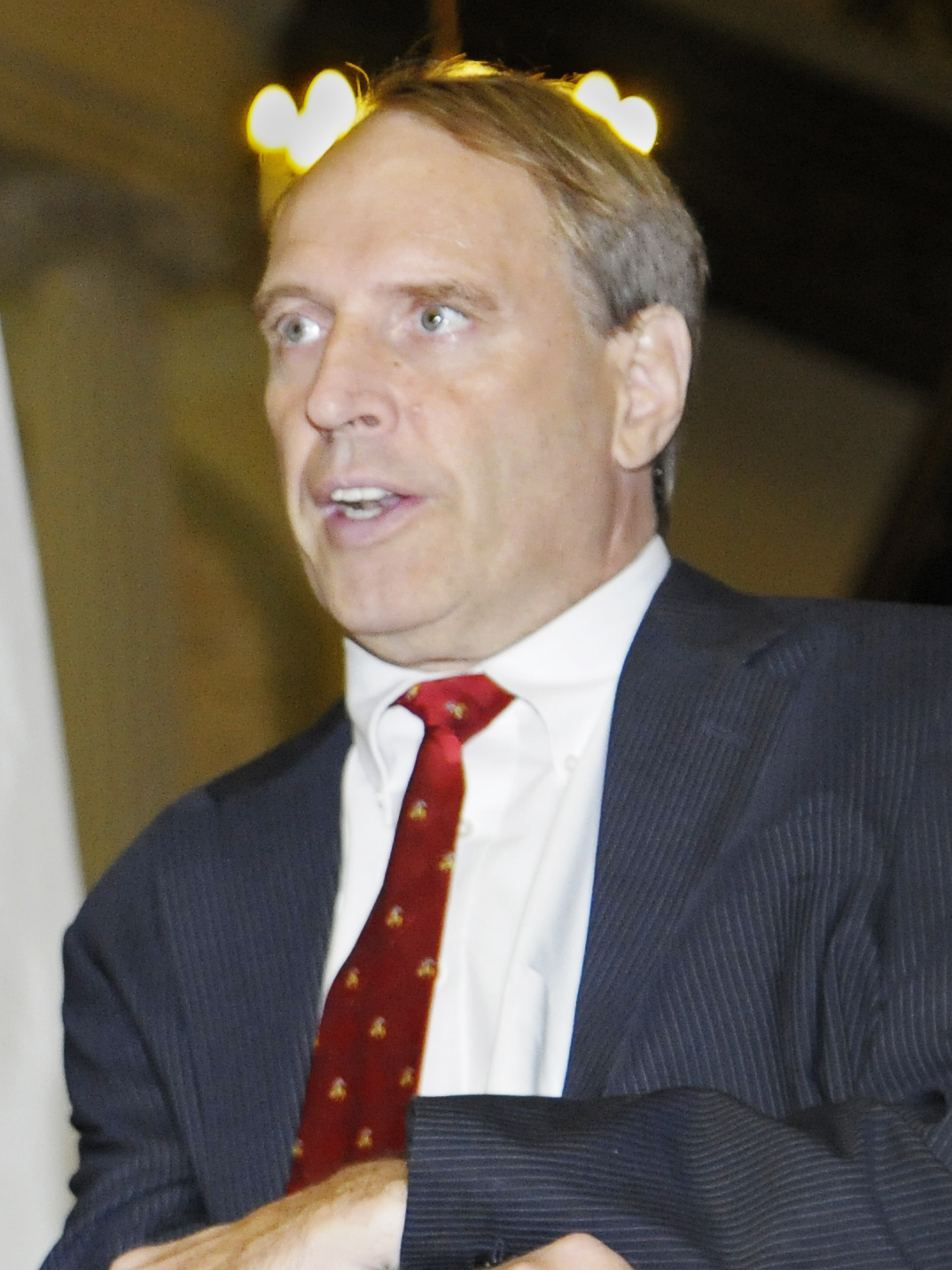
- Kennedy in 2008

Member of the Massachusetts Senate from the 2nd Plymouth and Bristol district
- In office January 7, 2009 – June 28, 2015
- Preceded by: Robert S. Creedon Jr.
- Succeeded by: Michael Brady

Member of the Massachusetts House of Representatives from the 9th Plymouth district
- In office 1983–2009
- Preceded by: Mark Lawton
- Succeeded by: Michael Brady

Member of the Brockton City Council from Ward 2
- In office 1978–1985

Personal details
- Born: August 15, 1951 Brockton, Massachusetts, U.S.
- Died: June 28, 2015 (aged 63) Brockton, Massachusetts
- Party: Democratic

Thomas Patrick Kennedy (August 15, 1951 – June 28, 2015) was an American politician.

== Early life and education ==
Born in Brockton, Massachusetts, Kennedy graduated from Cardinal Spellman High School in 1969. He studied for the Roman Catholic priesthood at Our Lady of Hope Seminary. While studying at the seminary, Kennedy was seriously injured that left him a quadriplegic. Kennedy received his associate degree from Massasoit Community College, his bachelor's degree from Stonehill College, and his master's degree from the John F. Kennedy School of Government.

== Career ==
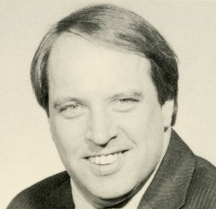
Official portrait, circa 2003

Kennedy began his political career as the City of Brockton's Ombudsman under Brockton Mayor David Crosby. Kennedy then entered elected office, serving on the Brockton City Council representing Ward 2 from 1978 to 1985. In addition to serving as Brockton City Councilor, from 1978 to 1983 Kennedy also served as an aide to Congressman Brian Donnelly.

In 1983 Kennedy won a 9-way special Democratic primary for the 9th Plymouth District with 33% of the vote, after incumbent Democratic State Representative Mark Lawton stepped down. Kennedy served in the Massachusetts House of Representatives as the 9th Plymouth District State Representative from 1983 until 2009.

In 2008, incumbent Democratic State Senator Robert S. Creedon decided not to run for re-election, and Kennedy ran for and won the now-vacant State Senate seat, facing no opposition in the Democratic primary. Kennedy served in the Massachusetts State Senate representing the 2nd Plymouth and Bristol district, which includes his hometown of Brockton, Massachusetts and several surrounding towns, until his death in 2015.

== Death ==
Kennedy died from pneumonia in 2015.
