= Christine Canavan =

American politician

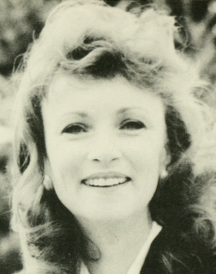

Member of the Massachusetts House of Representatives from the 10th Plymouth district
- In office 1993 – January 7, 2015
- Preceded by: John F. Cruz
- Succeeded by: Michelle DuBois

Personal details
- Born: January 25, 1950 (age 76) Dorchester, Massachusetts
- Party: Democratic
- Spouse: Paul
- Children: 2
- Education: Massasoit Community College, University of Massachusetts Boston
- Website: christinecanavan.com

Christine E. Canavan is a former American state legislator who served in the Massachusetts House of Representatives from 1993 to 2015. She was the state representative for the 10th Plymouth District, which consists of West Bridgewater, Ward 4, Precincts B&C; Ward 5, Precincts B, C & D; and all of Ward 6 of Brockton, Precinct 3 of Easton, and Precinct 1 of East Bridgewater. She declined to seek re-election in 2014.

== Early life and career ==
Canavan graduated from Massasoit Community College in 1983 with an Associate degree in nursing. In 1988, Canavan received a Bachelor's degree in nursing from University of Massachusetts, Boston. She was employed as a registered nurse prior to becoming a legislator.

== Political career ==
Before becoming a state legislator, Canavan served for three years on the Brockton school committee. Canavan was first elected to the Massachusetts House of Representatives in 1993. She has been re-elected every time since her first campaign. In many years, Canavan has not faced a primary or general election opponent. In 2010, she faced her most difficult reelection campaign in many years, defeating Matt Albanese in the primary with 52% of the vote, and defeating John Cruz of West Bridgewater in the general election with 53% of the vote.

As a state representative, Canavan serves on the Joint Committee on Economic Development and Emerging Technologies, the Joint Committee on Housing, the Joint Committee on Public Health, the Joint Committee on Ways and Means, and the House Committee on Ways and Means. Creedon's voting record in the house has been consistently high in recent years, with the exception of 2011, when she spent the beginning of the year recovering from a broken leg.

When a bill was before the House regarding the placement of a ballot question that called for banning gay marriage, Canavan initially voted yes for the bill, but changed her position by voting against an amendment later on that essentially killed the bill. Canavan voted in favor of casino gaming in a 2011 vote. She has publicly stated that she has reservations about the cost of a south coast commuter rail extension, but would support such a project if environmental concerns are taken care of.

Canavan announced in January 2014 that she would not seek re-election when her term expired in 2015; also indicated a desire to study and become a Methodist minister.

== Electoral history ==
=== 2010 ===
Massachusetts House of Representatives 10th Plymouth District, 2010
Party	Candidate	Votes	%	±%
Democratic	Christine E. Canavan	6,705	53.13	
Republican	John Cruz	5,237	41.50	

Democratic Primary 10th Plymouth District, 2010
Party	Candidate	Votes	%	±%
Democratic	Christine E. Canavan	1,477	52.43	
Democratic	Matthew P. Albanese	1,340	47.56	

=== 2004 ===
Massachusetts House of Representatives 10th Plymouth District, 2004
Party	Candidate	Votes	%	±%
Democratic	Christine E. Canavan	10,604	70.60	
Republican	Mark Chauppette	4,414	29.39	
