= Michael C. Creedon =

American politician

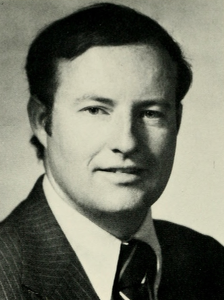
Michael Creedon, 1983 Massachusetts House of Representatives

Michael C. Creedon (born November 3, 1946) is an American judge and politician.

He graduated from Harvard College and Suffolk University Law School.

Creedon won his first election in 1974 for the 13th Plymouth district of the Massachusetts House of Representatives. He served until the 1978 election cycle, when he was redistricted to the 10th Plymouth district. Creedon retained his seat as a state representative until running for the Massachusetts Senate in 1988. As a state senator, Creedon held the Plymouth seat from 1988 to the 1994 election cycle, when he won a single term as a senator from the 2nd Plymouth and Bristol district. After stepping down from the Massachusetts General Court, Creedon subsequently served as first justice of the Falmouth District Court. He was placed on administrative leave in June 2016 and investigated for making racially insensitive comments, and granted early retirement in September 2016.

Creedon's brother Robert and sister-in-law Geraldine have both served on the Massachusetts House of Representatives.
