= Massachusetts House of Representatives' 3rd Plymouth district =

American legislative district

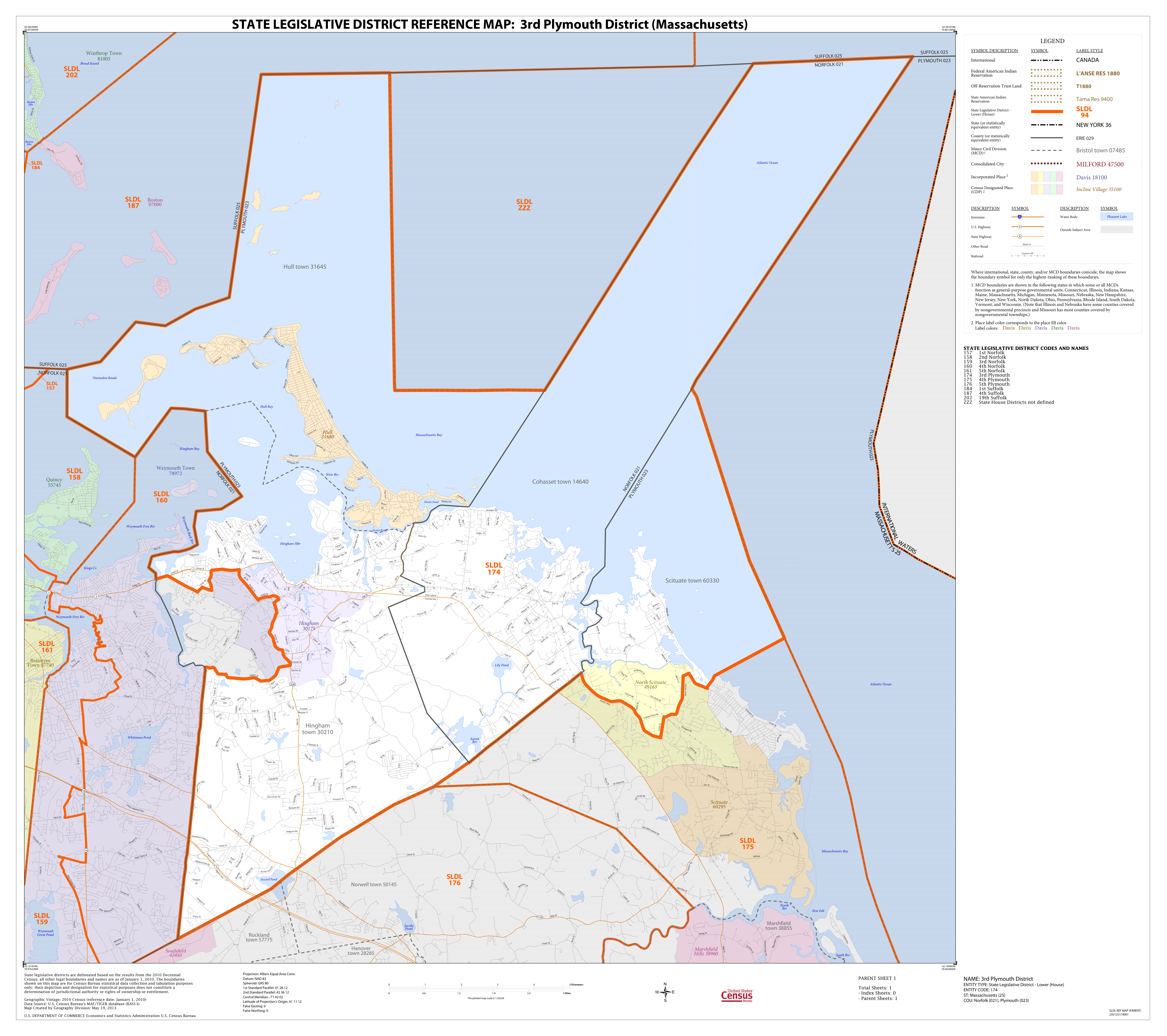
Map of Massachusetts House of Representatives' 3rd Plymouth district, based on the 2010 United States census.

Massachusetts House of Representatives' 3rd Plymouth district in the United States is one of 160 legislative districts included in the lower house of the Massachusetts General Court. It covers parts of Norfolk County and Plymouth County. Democrat Joan Meschino of Hull has represented the district since 2017.

== Towns represented ==
The district includes the following localities:

- Cohasset
- Hingham
- Hull

The current district geographic boundary overlaps with that of the Massachusetts Senate's Plymouth and Norfolk district.

=== Former locales ===
The district previously covered:

- Hanover, circa 1872
- Hanson, circa 1872
- South Scituate, circa 1872

== Representatives ==
- Lemuel C. Waterman, circa 1858
- Benjamin F. Burgess, circa 1859
- Henry A. Turner, circa 1888
- Walter Shuebruk, circa 1920
- Nathaniel M. Hurwitz, circa 1951
- George Chester Young, circa 1975
- Joan Meschino, 2017-current

== See also ==
- List of Massachusetts House of Representatives elections
- Other Plymouth County districts of the Massachusetts House of Representatives: 1st, 2nd, 4th, 5th, 6th, 7th, 8th, 9th, 10th, 11th, 12th
- List of Massachusetts General Courts
- List of former districts of the Massachusetts House of Representatives

== Images ==
Portraits of legislators

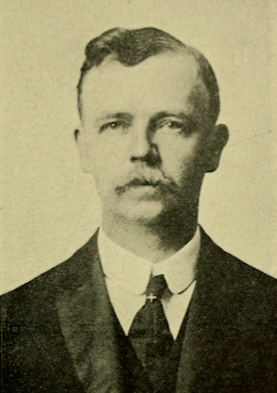
Elmer Curtiss

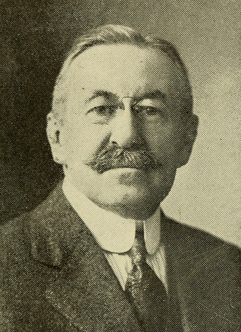
George Marsh

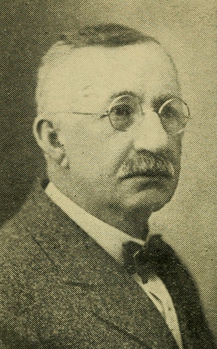
John L. Mitchell

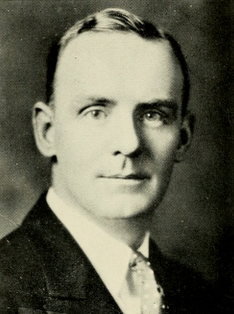
John Knowles

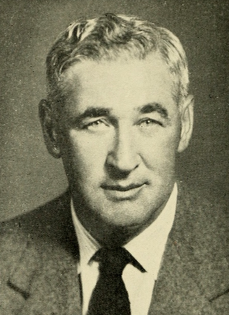
Nathaniel Hurwitz

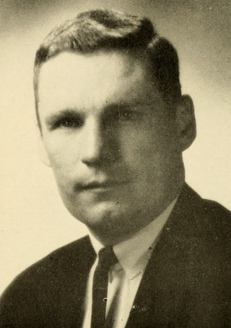
John Buckley

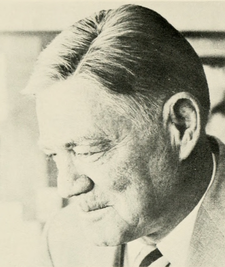
George Young

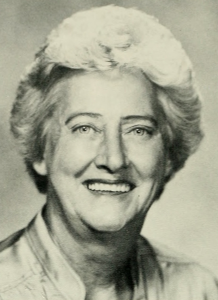
Mary Jeanette Murray

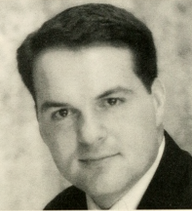
Garrett Bradley
