= Rita Mendes =

American state legislator

Member of the Massachusetts House of Representatives from the 11th Plymouth district
- Incumbent
- Assumed office January 4, 2023
- Preceded by: Claire Cronin

Member of the Brockton City Council at-large
- In office January 2020 – January 2023

Personal details
- Party: Democratic
- Education: Massasoit Community College; University of Massachusetts, Dartmouth (BS); New England School of Law (JD)

Rita Mendes is an American state legislator serving in the Massachusetts House of Representatives. She is a Brockton, Massachusetts resident and a member of the Democratic Party.

== Early life and education ==
Mendes was born in Brazil and immigrated to the United States when she was 12 years old. She graduated from Brockton High School and later attended Massasoit Community College where she earned her Associate degree. She went on to receive her bachelor's degree from the University of Massachusetts, Dartmouth and her Juris Doctor from the New England School of Law.

== Political career ==
Mendes was elected to the Brockton City Council in 2019. She became the first Brazilian-American to hold office in Brockton. In 2022, after United States President Joe Biden named Claire Cronin ambassador to Ireland, Mendes announced her run for the vacant Massachusetts House of Representatives' 11th Plymouth district. She won the Democratic primary with 67.6% of the vote. Mendes faced no opposition in the general election, winning with over 90% of the vote.
