= Peter Forman =

American politician

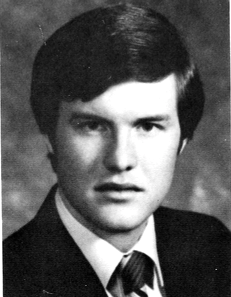

Plymouth County, Massachusetts Sheriff
- In office November 21, 1994 – October 13, 1999
- Preceded by: Peter Flynn
- Succeeded by: Charles Decas

Minority Leader of the Massachusetts House of Representatives
- In office 1991–1995
- Preceded by: Steven Pierce
- Succeeded by: Edward B. Teague III

Member of the Massachusetts House of Representatives from the 1st Plymouth District
- In office 1981–1995
- Preceded by: Alfred Almeida
- Succeeded by: Linda Teagan

Personal details
- Born: April 28, 1958 (age 68) Plymouth, Massachusetts
- Party: Republican
- Education: Colby College
- Occupation: Politician

Peter Forman (born April 28, 1958, in Plymouth, Massachusetts) is an American former politician who served as a member of the Massachusetts House of Representatives, Sheriff of Plymouth County, Massachusetts, and as a member of the Paul Celucci and Jane M. Swift administrations.

== Massachusetts House of Representatives ==
Forman represented the 1st Plymouth District in the Massachusetts House of Representatives from 1981 to 1995. He was the minority whip from 1989 to 1991 and in 1991 succeeded the departing Steven Pierce as House Minority Leader. Forman was a candidate for Secretary of the Commonwealth of Massachusetts in 1994, but lost in the Republican primary to State Senator Arthur E. Chase.

== Sheriff of Plymouth County ==
On November 21, 1994, Forman was appointed by Governor William Weld to serve as Plymouth County Sheriff. In 1996 he defeated Patricia Lawton in a special election to finish the term of former sheriff Peter Flynn. He was elected to his first full term in 1998; defeating Halifax Selectman Troy Garron. Forman resigned as sheriff less than a year later to join the Cellucci administration.

== Cellucci and Swift administrations ==
Forman joined the Cellucci administration as deputy secretary of administration and finance. When Jane M. Swift succeeded Cellucci as governor, she named Forman her chief of staff. As Swift's chief of staff, Forman helped the acting governor in her attempt to remove Christy Mihos and Jordan Levy from the Massachusetts Turnpike Authority board and with the shakeup at the Massachusetts Port Authority following the September 11 attacks. While Swift was on a "working maternity leave" following the birth of her twin daughters, Forman carried out many key duties of the governor's office.

Forman was fired by Swift on January 23, 2002. Following his dismissal, he worked without pay to help Swift's running mate Patrick Guerriero prepare to face Jim Rappaport at the Republican Convention.

== South Shore Chamber of Commerce ==
Forman was president and CEO of the South Shore Chamber of Commerce from 2004 until his retirement in 2024. He was succeeded by former Massachusetts State Treasurer Tim Cahill.
