= Massachusetts House of Representatives' 5th Plymouth district =

American legislative district

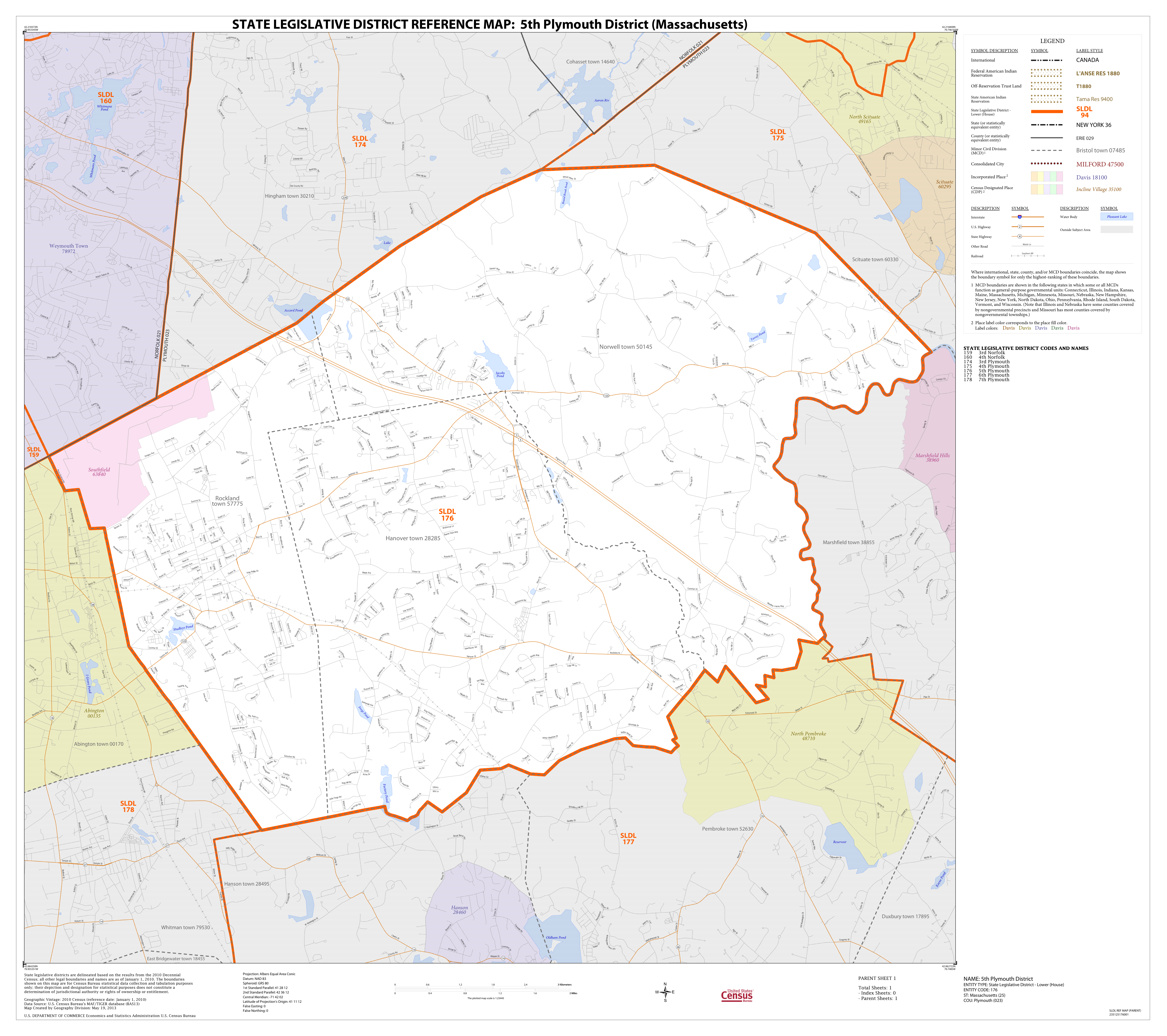
Map of Massachusetts House of Representatives' 5th Plymouth district, based on the 2010 United States census.

Massachusetts House of Representatives' 5th Plymouth district in the United States is one of 160 legislative districts included in the lower house of the Massachusetts General Court. It covers part of Plymouth County. Republican David DeCoste of Norwell has represented the district since 2015.

== Towns represented ==
The district includes the following localities:

- Hanover
- Norwell
- Rockland

The current district geographic boundary overlaps with those of the Massachusetts Senate's Norfolk and Plymouth district, 2nd Plymouth and Bristol district, and Plymouth and Norfolk district.

=== Former locales ===
The district previously covered:

- Duxbury, circa 1872
- Kingston, circa 1872

== Representatives ==
- William Ellison, circa 1858
- Job W. Drew, circa 1859
- George Hartford Hunt, circa 1888
- Frank N. Coulson, circa 1920
- Michael J. McCarthy, circa 1951
- Robert W. Gillette, circa 1975
- David F. DeCoste, 2015-current

== See also ==
- List of Massachusetts House of Representatives elections
- Other Plymouth County districts of the Massachusetts House of Representatives: 1st, 2nd, 3rd, 4th, 6th, 7th, 8th, 9th, 10th, 11th, 12th
- List of Massachusetts General Courts
- List of former districts of the Massachusetts House of Representatives

== Images ==
Portraits of legislators

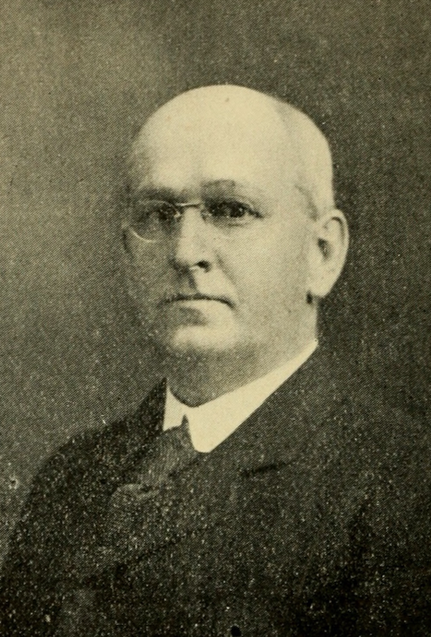
Wallace Arnold

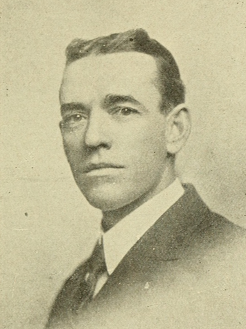
John Crowley

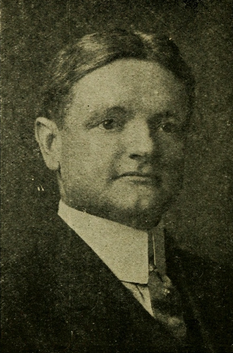
Maurice Greaney

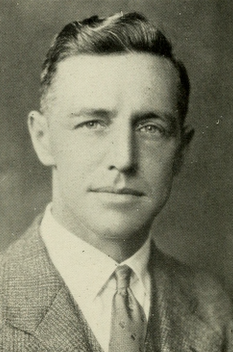
William Brown

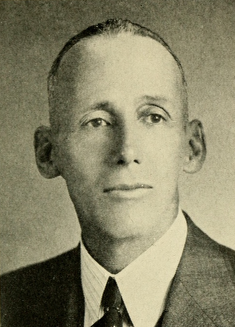
Michael McCarthy

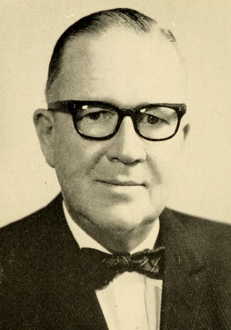
John Armstrong

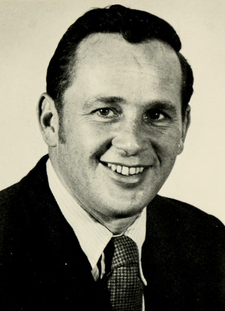
Robert Gillette

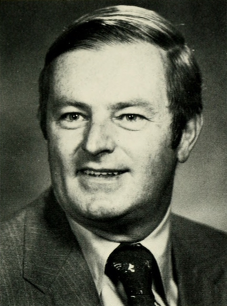
William Flynn

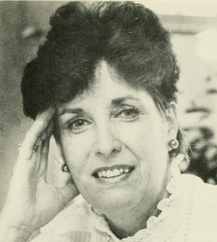
Janet W. O'Brien

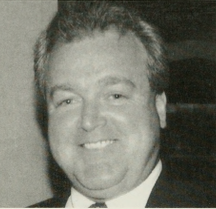
Robert Nyman
