= Massachusetts House of Representatives' 12th Plymouth district =

American legislative district

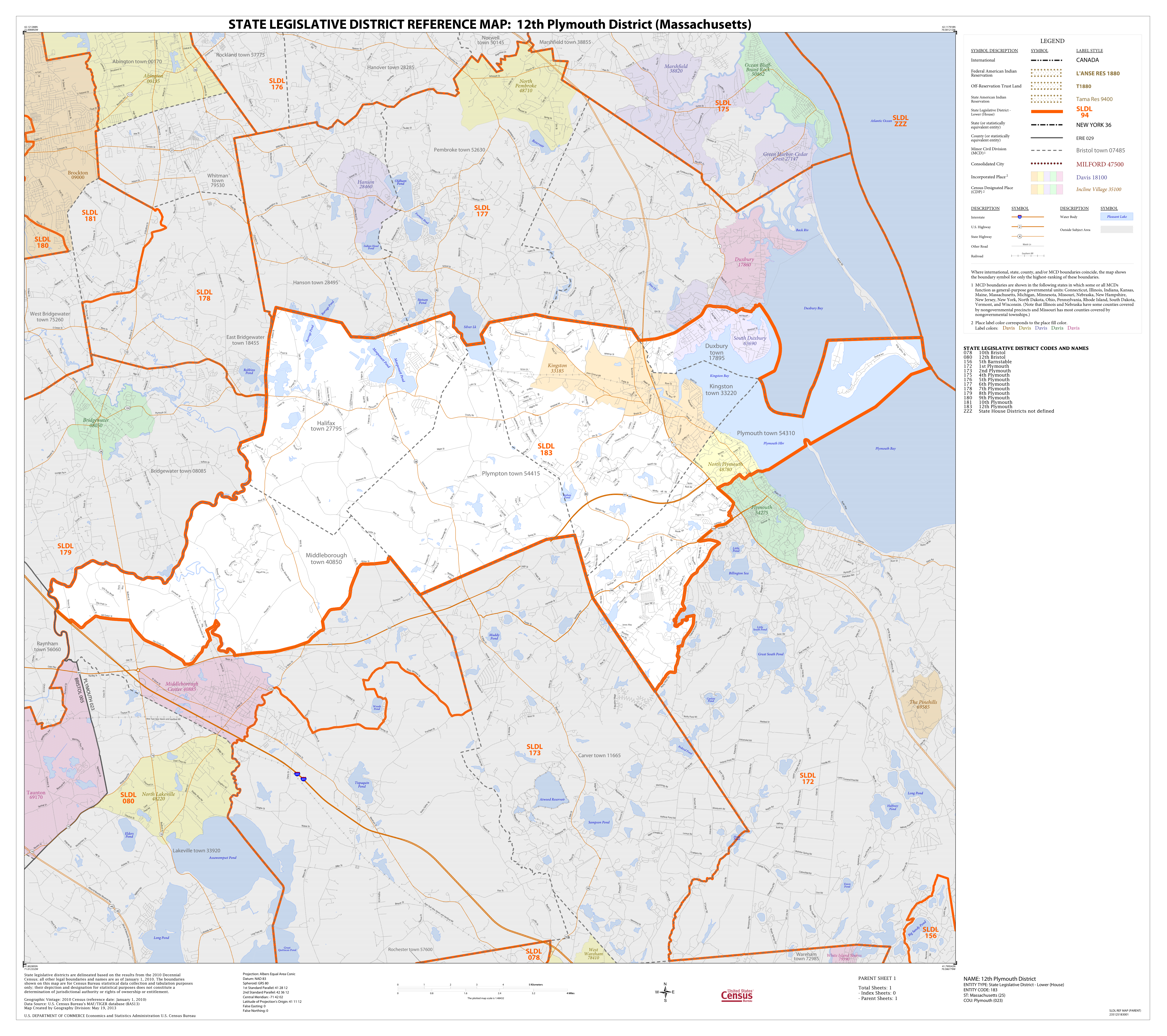
Map of Massachusetts House of Representatives' 12th Plymouth district, based on the 2010 United States census.

Massachusetts House of Representatives' 12th Plymouth district in the United States is one of 160 legislative districts included in the lower house of the Massachusetts General Court. It covers part of Plymouth County. Democrat Kathy LaNatra of Kingston has represented the district since 2019.

== Towns represented ==
The district includes the following localities:

- part of Halifax
- all of Kingston
- part of Middleborough
- part of Pembroke
- part of Plymouth
- all of Plympton

The current district geographic boundary overlaps with those of the Massachusetts Senate's 1st Plymouth and Bristol district, 2nd Plymouth and Bristol district, Plymouth and Barnstable district, and Plymouth and Norfolk district.

=== Former locale ===
The district previously covered Abington, circa 1872.

== Representatives ==
- Daniel U. Johnson, circa 1858-1859
- William L. Reed, circa 1858-1859
- Charles C. Bixby, circa 1888
- Mark E. Lawton, circa 1975
- Robert Kraus 1989–1996
- Thomas J. O'Brien 1997–2006
- Thomas Calter 2007–2018
- Kathleen R. LaNatra, 2019-current

== See also ==
- List of Massachusetts House of Representatives elections
- Other Plymouth County districts of the Massachusetts House of Representatives: 1st, 2nd, 3rd, 4th, 5th, 6th, 7th, 8th, 9th, 10th, 11th
- List of Massachusetts General Courts
- List of former districts of the Massachusetts House of Representatives

== Images ==
Portraits of legislators

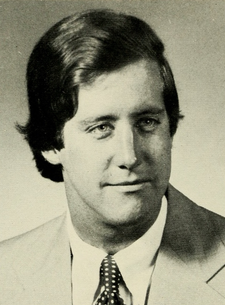
Mark Lawton

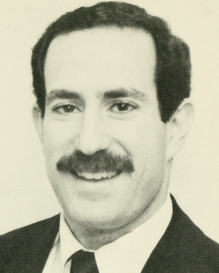
Robert Kraus

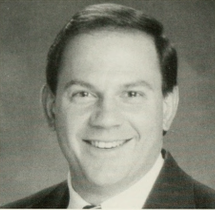
Thomas O'Brien
