= Charles Decas =

American politician

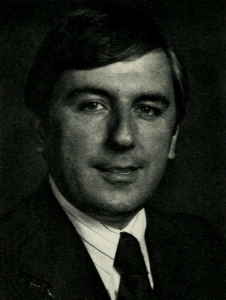
- Portrait of Charles Decas

Plymouth County, Massachusetts Sheriff
- In office 2000–2001
- Preceded by: Peter Forman
- Succeeded by: Joseph F. McDonough

Member of the Massachusetts House of Representatives from the 2nd Plymouth District
- In office 1979–1997
- Preceded by: William J. Flynn, Jr.
- Succeeded by: Ruth Provost

Member of the Massachusetts House of Representatives from the 7th Plymouth District
- In office 1977–1979
- Preceded by: Charles A. MacKenzie, Jr.
- Succeeded by: Andrew Card

Personal details
- Born: October 5, 1937 (age 88) Brookline, Massachusetts
- Party: Republican
- Education: Babson College
- Occupation: Business executive Politician

Charles N. Decas (born October 5, 1937) is an American politician who was Sheriff of Plymouth County, Massachusetts from 2000 to 2001, a member of the Massachusetts House of Representatives from 1977 to 1997, and a member of the Wareham, Massachusetts Board of Selectmen from 1974 to 1977.
