= Susan Williams Gifford =

American politician in Massachusetts (1959–2024)

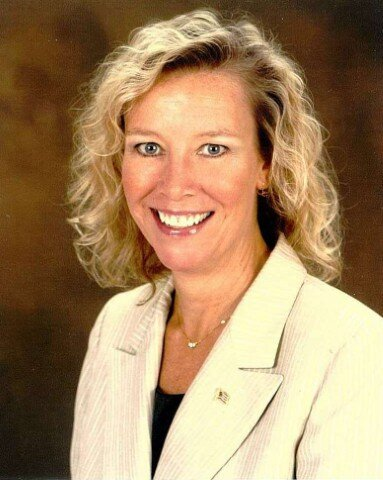
- Portrait c. 2003

Member of the Massachusetts House of Representatives from the 2nd Plymouth district
- In office 2003 – October 22, 2024
- Preceded by: Ruth Provost
- Succeeded by: John Gaskey

Personal details
- Born: November 3, 1959 St. Joseph, Michigan, U.S.
- Died: October 22, 2024 (aged 64) Wareham, Massachusetts, U.S.
- Party: Republican
- Education: Western Michigan University, (B.A.)

Susan Williams Gifford (November 3, 1959 – October 22, 2024) was an American politician who was a Republican member of the Massachusetts House of Representatives. She represented the Second Plymouth from 2003 until her death in 2024.

== Background ==
Gifford was born on November 3, 1959. She graduated from St. Joseph High School, St. Joseph, Michigan, and later from Western Michigan University, with her Bachelor of Arts degree in 1982.

Gifford was a Claims Consultant for Insurance Overload Systems from 2000 to 2002. She served as a Selectman for the town of Wareham from 1999 to 2002.

Gifford died from cancer on October 22, 2024, at the age of 64.

== Memberships ==
Gifford was a member of the Wareham Land Trust, Buzzards Bay Village Association, Onset Bay Village Association, Barnstable County Republican Club, Cape Cod Republican Club, Plymouth County Republican Club, Wareham Republican Town Committee, Caucus of Women Legislators, and the Manufactured Home Commission.

== Committee assignments ==
- House Committee on Steering, Policy and Scheduling
- Joint Committee on Environment, Natural Resources and Agriculture
- Joint Committee on Financial Services
- Joint Committee on Health Care Financing
- Joint Committee on Tourism, Arts and Cultural Development

== Elections ==
=== 2010 ===
Gifford won re-election to the Second Plymouth Seat in 2010. She had no primary opposition. She defeated David Smith (D) in the general election on November 2, 2010.

Massachusetts House of Representatives elections, 2010:

- Susan Williams Gifford (R) (inc.) - 10,398 (62.73%)
- David A. Smith (D) - 5,331 (32.16%)

=== 2008 ===
Gifford won re-election to the Second Plymouth Seat on November 4, 2008. She had no primary opposition and she ran unopposed in the general election. She defeated David Smith (D) in the general election on November 4, 2008.

Massachusetts House of Representatives elections, 2008:

- Susan Williams Gifford (R) (inc.) - 16,211 (73.58%)
- Blanks - 5,590 (25.37%)
- All others - 230 (.01%)

== See also ==
- 2019–2020 Massachusetts legislature
- 2021–2022 Massachusetts legislature
