= Massachusetts House of Representatives' 1st Plymouth district =

American legislative district

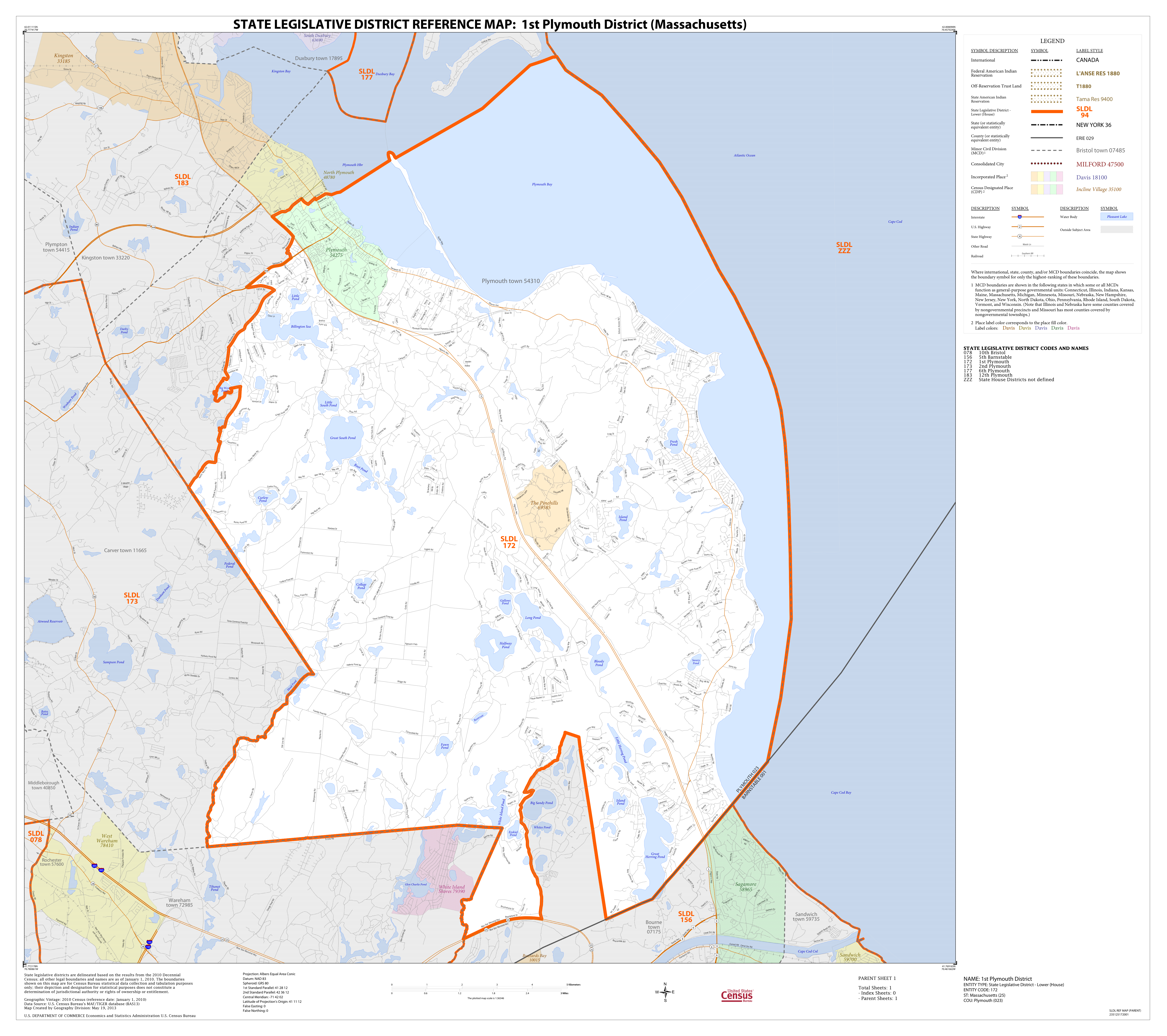
Map of Massachusetts House of Representatives' 1st Plymouth district, based on the 2010 United States census.

Massachusetts House of Representatives' 1st Plymouth district in the United States is one of 160 legislative districts included in the lower house of the Massachusetts General Court. It covers part of the city of Plymouth in Plymouth County. Democrat Michelle Badger has represented the district since 2025.

The current district geographic boundary overlaps with that of the Massachusetts Senate's Plymouth and Barnstable district.

== Representatives ==
- George M. Allen, circa 1858
- John Burnham, circa 1859
- Elkanah Finney, circa 1888
- Alfred Burns, circa 1908
- Elmer Briggs, circa 1918
- Alfred P. Richards, circa 1920
- John J. O'Brien, circa 1923
- Ira Ward, circa 1935
- John A. Armstrong, circa 1951
- George Young, circa 1967
- Daniel J. Henderson, circa 1975
- Caroline Stouffer, 1977-1978
- Alfred Almeida, circa 1980
- Peter Forman, 1981–1995
- Linda Teagan, 1995–1997
- Joseph Gallitano, 1997–1999
- Vinny deMacedo, 1999 – January 7, 2015
- Matt Muratore, 2015-2025
- Michelle Badger, 2025-Present

== Former locales ==
The district previously covered:

- Cohasset, circa 1872
- Scituate, circa 1872

== See also ==
- List of Massachusetts House of Representatives elections
- Other Plymouth County districts of the Massachusetts House of Representatives: 2nd, 3rd, 4th, 5th, 6th, 7th, 8th, 9th, 10th, 11th, 12th
- List of Massachusetts General Courts
- List of former districts of the Massachusetts House of Representatives

== Images ==
Portraits of legislators

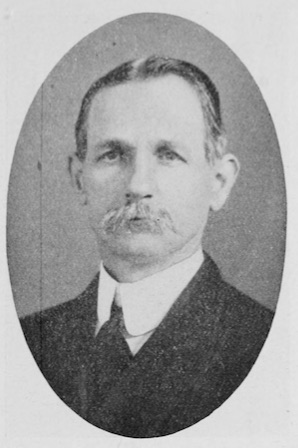
Alfred Burns

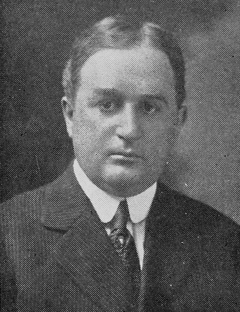
Elmer Briggs

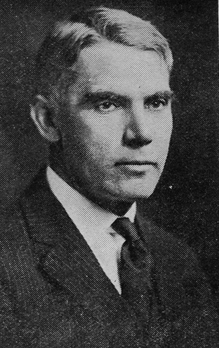
John J. O'Brien

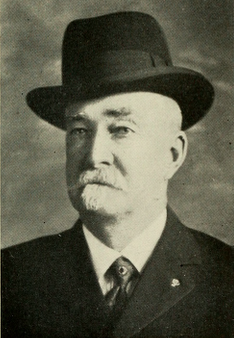
Ira Ward

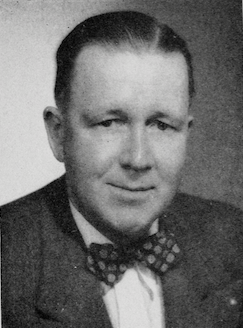
John Armstrong

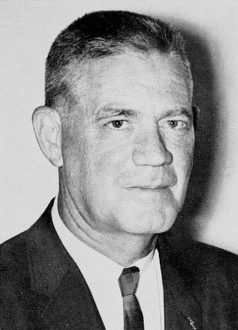
George Young

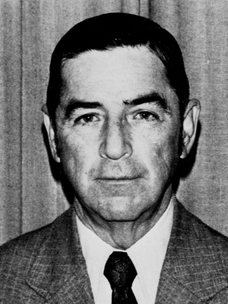
Daniel Henderson

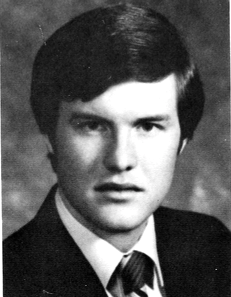
Peter Forman

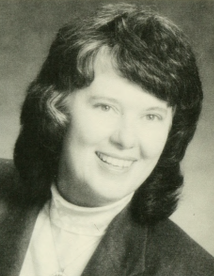
Linda Teagan
