= Vinny deMacedo =

American politician (born 1965)

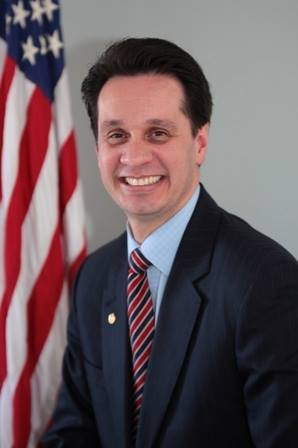

Member of the Massachusetts Senate from the Plymouth and Barnstable district
- In office January 7, 2015 – November 29, 2019
- Preceded by: Therese Murray
- Succeeded by: Susan Moran

Member of the Massachusetts House of Representatives from the 1st Plymouth district
- In office 1999 – January 7, 2015
- Preceded by: Joseph Gallitano
- Succeeded by: Matt Muratore

Personal details
- Born: Viriato Manuel Pereira de Macedo; October 16, 1965 (age 60) Brava, Cape Verde
- Party: Republican
- Spouse: Jennifer deMacedo
- Children: 3
- Website: http://www.demacedo.org

Viriato Manuel Pereira de Macedo (born October 16, 1965), also popularly known as Vinny deMacedo, is a Cape Verdean American politician, and was the Massachusetts State Senator for the Plymouth and Barnstable District, which comprises the communities of Bourne, Falmouth, Kingston, Pembroke, Plymouth, and Sandwich. He is a Republican who was sworn into the Massachusetts Senate on January 7, 2015. In November 2019 deMacedo resigned from the Massachusetts Senate to take a job in higher education.

== Political career ==
Senator deMacedo had no political experience prior to becoming a candidate for the Massachusetts House of Representatives on November 3, 1998, running against the Democratic incumbent Joseph Gallitano. He won the election by a tight margin of 189 votes. He subsequently won re-election as Massachusetts State Representative seven times, serving through 2014.

In November 2014, he was elected to the Massachusetts Senate, succeeding retiring Massachusetts Senate President Therese Murray as state senator for the Plymouth and Barnstable District. As of 2016 he held the position of Ranking Minority Member on the Senate Committee on Ways and Means. His legislative priorities included solving the opiate epidemic facing Massachusetts and ensuring the Commonwealth's fiscal responsibility. Vinny served as one of five state senators (along with 11 state representatives) on the Joint Committee on Marijuana Policy.

During his 16 years in the Massachusetts House, he received many awards for his legislative work including:

- Twice named Legislator of the Year - Massachusetts Town Clerks Association
- Legislator of the Year - Jewish Community Relations Council
- Legislator of the Year – Council of Human Services Providers; and
- National Federation of Independent Business Guardian of Small Business Award.

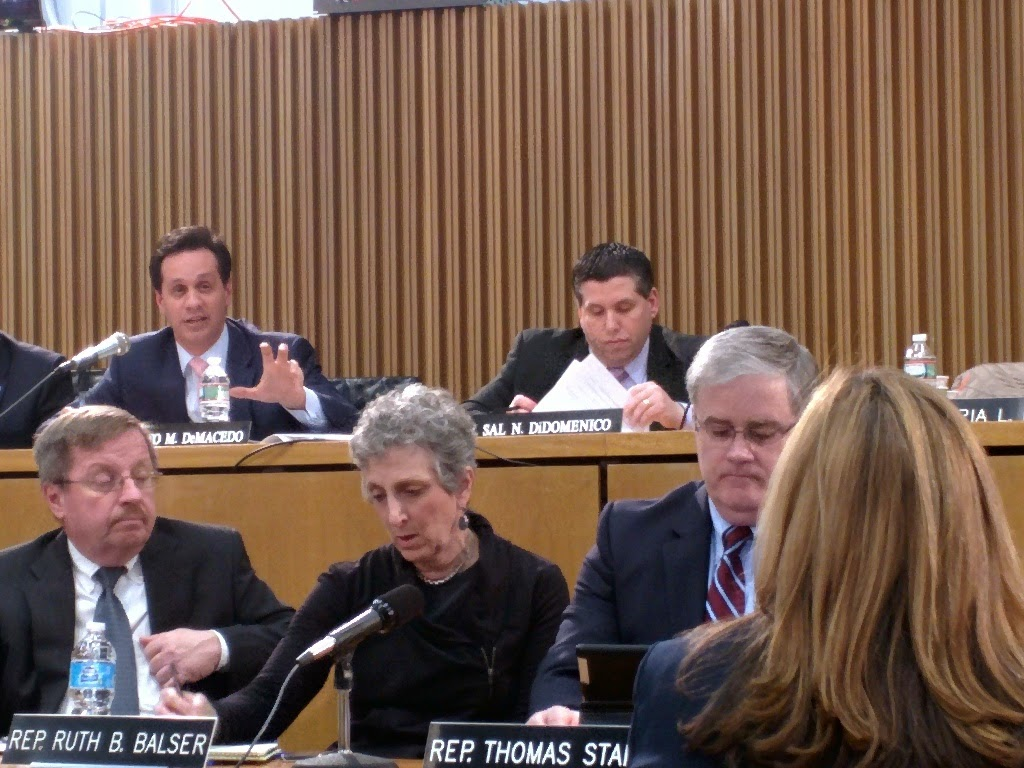
Photo of Senator Vinny deMacedo at Massachusetts Ways and Means hearings.

== Biography ==
Senator deMacedo was born in Brava, Cape Verde. He has six siblings, including an older brother, Donaldo Macedo. In 1966, when he was six months old, the family immigrated to the New England region of the United States, where they lived at first in Dorchester, before three years later moving to Kingston, where deMacedo was raised. He graduated from Silver Lake Regional High School in 1983. He went on to study at New York's The King's College, from which he graduated with a Bachelor of Arts in Business Administration in 1987.

After graduating deMacedo began working for his brother in the car business before starting his own gas station in Cedarville in 1991. He continues to be the owner and operator of the RWA Mobil Station on Route 3A. He is a member of the Cedarville and Sagamore Business Association and the Plymouth Area Chamber of Commerce.

He is married to Jennifer de Macedo, and is the father of three children.

He visited Cape Verde in January 2008, for the first time since moving to the United States, as part of a political mission, and met several members of the Cape Verdean government, including the President Pedro Pires.

== See also ==
- 2019–2020 Massachusetts legislature

Preceded by Therese Murray	Massachusetts State Senator Plymouth and Barnstable District; 2015–2019	Succeeded by Susan Moran
Preceded by Joseph Gallitano	Massachusetts State Representative 1st Plymouth District; 1999–2015	Succeeded by Matt Muratore
