= Thomas Calter =

American politician

Town Administrator in Kingston
- In office 2018–2020

12th Plymouth District Representative
- In office 2007–2018
- Preceded by: Tom O'Brien
- Succeeded by: Kathleen LaNatra

Personal details
- Born: Thomas J. Calter III; September 10, 1957 (age 68) Boston, Massachusetts, USA
- Party: Democratic Party
- Spouse: Patty Calter
- Children: 3
- Education: North Adams State College; Northeastern University

Thomas J. Calter III (born September 10, 1957 in Boston) is the former town administrator of Kingston, Massachusetts. He previously represented the 12th Plymouth District, which includes the towns of Kingston and Plympton and parts of Plymouth, Duxbury, Halifax, and Middleborough, in the Massachusetts House of Representatives. He is a member of the Democratic Party.

== Early life and education ==
Calter was born on September 10, 1957 in Boston, Massachusetts and raised in Avon. He attended Cardinal Spellman High School before receiving his BA from North Adams State College and his MBA from Northeastern University.

== Career ==
Prior to his political career, Calter spent more than 30 years working in the environmental services industry. He was elected to the Massachusetts House of Representatives in 2006 in a short campaign. His predecessor, Tom O'Brien was appointed to the post Treasurer of Plymouth County in August 2006, after it was too late to be taken off the ballot for the primary election. O'Brien won the popular vote in the primary election, but declined the nomination. Calter was selected in a caucus of representatives from the Democratic Town Committees in the district to be the Democratic nominee on the ballot. In the general election, Calter defeated Olly deMacedo by 296 votes. He resigned from the House in 2018 to become town administrator of Kingston.

=== Controversies ===
In early 2019, Halifax assessors demanded the payment of personal property taxes and delinquent interest in the amount of $12,511.09 by Jordan Health and Wellness Center, RKP Capital, LLC, of which Thomas Calter is the principal. Calter refused payment and instead insisted on either paying a smaller amount in the sum of $1,151.20 or appealing the issue to the Appellate Tax Board. The issue had been ongoing since mid-2016.

Calter's contract was bought out, with mutual agreement, in mid-2020 from his position as Town Administrator in Kingston after a public argument with a member of the Board of Selectmen in a local restaurant. The argument was a violation of town conduct policy. In December 2022, he became the Town Manager in the Town of Stoughton.

He was placed on administrative leave in Stoughton after allegations of firing the Towns first ever female police chief for refusing to destroy a report attached to the murder of Stoughton resident Sandra Birchmore. He is also alleged to have stated "I don't know who the next chief will be, but it will not be a woman." Police Chief Donna McNamara has filed a lawsuit against the Town of Stoughton and Calter personally.

== Personal life ==
Calter and his wife Patty live in Kingston and have three grown children, Ryan, Kerri, and Patrick.

Preceded by Tom O'Brien	Massachusetts State Representative 12th Plymouth District; 2007-2018	Succeeded by Kathleen LaNatra
