= Massachusetts House of Representatives' 2nd Plymouth district =

American legislative district

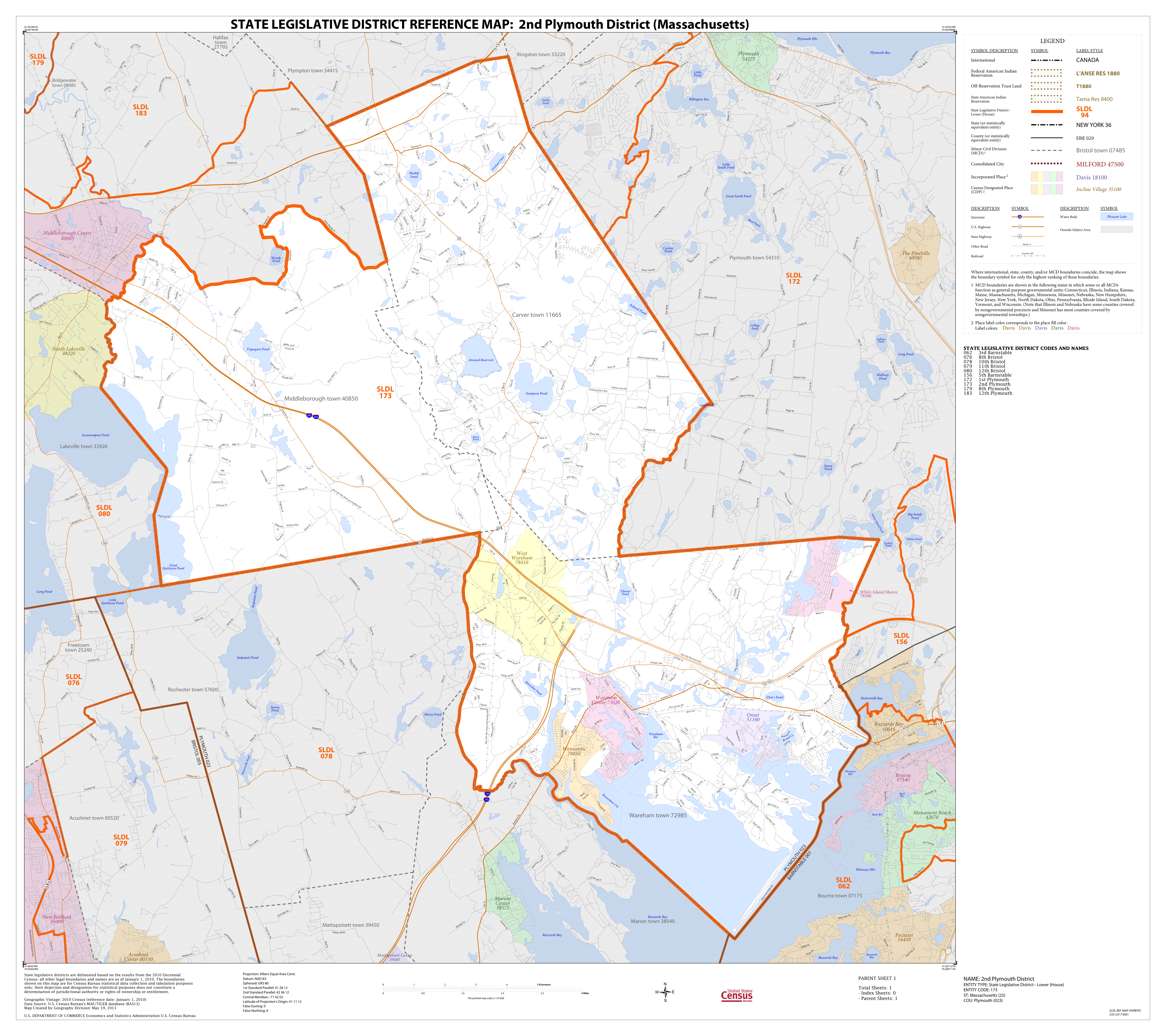
Map of Massachusetts House of Representatives' 2nd Plymouth district, based on the 2010 United States census.

Massachusetts House of Representatives' 2nd Plymouth district in the United States is one of 160 legislative districts included in the lower house of the Massachusetts General Court. It covers part of Plymouth County. Republican Representative Susan Williams Gifford of Wareham represented the district from 2003 until her death in 2024. It is now represented by Republican Representative John Gaskey of Carver.

== Towns represented ==
The district includes the following localities:

- Carver
- part of Middleborough
- Wareham

The current district geographic boundary overlaps with that of the Massachusetts Senate's 1st Plymouth and Bristol district.

=== Former locales ===
The district previously covered:

- Hingham, circa 1872
- Hull, circa 1872

== Representatives ==
- Eliphalet L. Cushing, circa 1858
- Demerick Marble, circa 1859
- Franklin W. Hatch, circa 1888
- Walter Haynes, circa 1920
- Nathaniel Tilden, circa 1951
- William J. Flynn, Jr., circa 1975
- Charles Decas
- Ruth Provost
- Susan Williams Gifford, 2003-2024
- John Gaskey, 2024-Current

== See also ==
- List of Massachusetts House of Representatives elections
- Other Plymouth County districts of the Massachusetts House of Representatives: 1st, 3rd, 4th, 5th, 6th, 7th, 8th, 9th, 10th, 11th, 12th
- List of Massachusetts General Courts
- List of former districts of the Massachusetts House of Representatives

== Images ==
Portraits of legislators

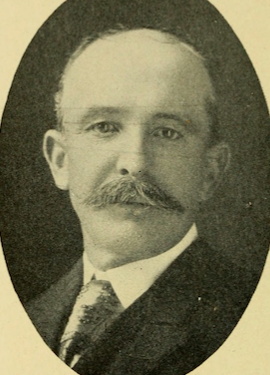
Joseph Shepherd

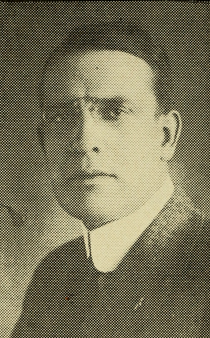
Walter Haynes

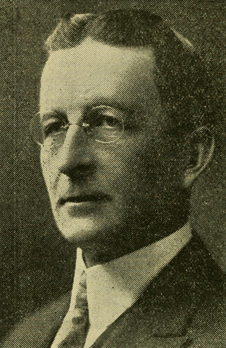
Ernest Sparrell

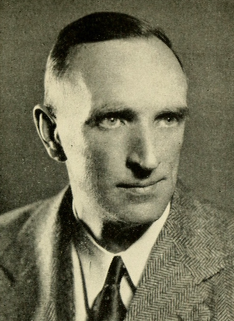
Nathaniel Tilden

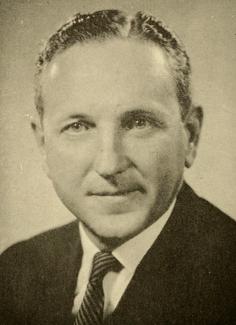
Alfred Shrigley

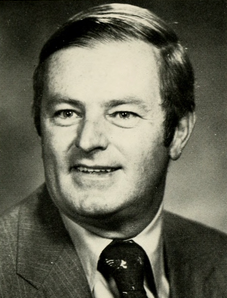
William Flynn

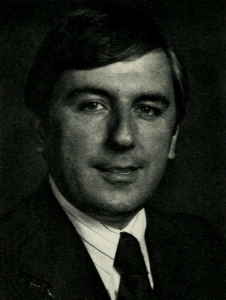
Charles Decas

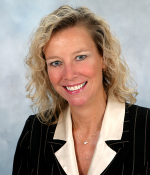
Susan Gifford
