= John Gaskey =

American politician in Massachusetts

Member of the Massachusetts House of Representatives from the 2nd Plymouth district
- Incumbent
- Assumed office 2025
- Preceded by: Susan Williams Gifford

Personal details
- Born: February 9, 1970 El Paso, Texas, U.S.
- Party: Republican

Military service
- Allegiance: United States
- Branch/service: United States Coast Guard
- Years of service: 1989–2012
- Rank: Chief petty officer (United States)
- Unit: USCGC Escanaba (WMEC-907)

John Robert Gaskey (born February 9, 1970) is an American politician who is a Republican member of the Massachusetts House of Representatives. He has represented the 2nd Plymouth district since 2025.

== Background ==
Gaskey was born on February 9, 1970 in El Paso, Texas to a military family. His sister serves in the United States Marine Corps, his father was in the United States Navy during the Vietnam War, his grandfather served in World War II in the Pacific Theater, and his great-grandfather served in World War I. Gaskey's oldest son currently serves full-time in the National Guard.

As a member of the United States Coast Guard, Gaskey was stationed in Massachusetts during the September 11 attacks. During Gaskey's time in the Coast Guard, he served on the USCGC Escanaba. The Escanaba patrolled the New England coast enforcing federal and international fishing regulations, carried out migrant interdiction patrols in the Caribbean, and also passed through the Panama Canal to carry out drug interdiction missions in the Eastern Pacific.

== Elections ==
=== 2024 ===
Gaskey won election to the 2nd Plymouth District seat in 2024. He challenged eleven-term incumbent Susan Williams Gifford in the Republican primary, emphasizing his conservative stance on immigration issues, and ultimately defeated Gifford by eighteen points. In the general election on November 5, 2024, Gaskey faced Democrat Sarah G. Hewins, a longtime member of the Carver Select Board who ran as a write-in candidate and obtained approximately 11% of the vote to 89% for Gaskey.

=== 2026 ===
Gaskey has announced his intention to run for re-election in 2026. He faces a challenge in the Republican primary from Carver selectman Mark Townsend, while his 2024 opponent Sarah Hewins has announced her intention to run again as a Democrat.

==== Lawsuit ====
In August 2026, Gaskey was sued by a former State House aide, Kayla Churchill. Churchill claimed that Gaskey fired her after she would not have sex with him or entertain his advances. Additionally, Churchill alleges that she was terminated after Gaskey learned she was in a relationship with another man. Gaskey's Lawyer, Michael Walsh (who is also a Republican Candidate for Attorney General) claims that the House of Representatives did an ethics investigation and found no evidence.

== Committee Assignments ==
For the 2025-26 Session, Gaskey sits on the following committees in the House:

- Ranking Minority, House Committee on Climate Action and Sustainability
- House Committee on Operations, Facilities and Security
- Joint Committee on Advanced Information Technology, the Internet and Cybersecurity
- Joint Committee on Environment and Natural Resources
- Joint Committee on Veterans and Federal Affairs
