= Kathleen LaNatra =

Massachusetts politician

Member of the Massachusetts House of Representatives from the 12th Plymouth District
- Incumbent
- Assumed office 2019
- Preceded by: Thomas Calter

Personal details
- Party: Democratic Party

Kathleen LaNatra is the 8th and current State Representative who represents the 12th Plymouth District in the Massachusetts House of Representatives. A member of the Democratic Party, she represents the towns of Halifax, Kingston, Pembroke, Plymouth, and Plympton. LaNatra serves on the House Committee on Technology and Intergovernmental Affairs, the Joint Committee on Economic Development and Emerging Technologies, the Joint Committee on Elder Affairs, and the Joint Committee on Election Laws.

LaNatra's professional experience includes working as a realtor, as an ACSM personal trainer, and as the owner of a specialty retail store. Before becoming a member of the Massachusetts House of Representatives, LaNatra served on the Kingston Recreation Commission from 2009 to 2018 and began serving on the Kingston Board of Selectmen in 2016. LaNatra is affiliated with the Kingston Democratic Town Committee, Meals on Wheels, the Kingston Council on Aging, and the Pembroke Women's Softball League. She has also served as a founding trustee on the Kingston Affordable Housing Trust, as a Kingston Community Preservation Committee member, and as a coach for the Kingston Youth Sports Organization.

== See also ==
- 2019–2020 Massachusetts legislature
- 2021–2022 Massachusetts legislature
