= Geraldine Creedon =

American politician

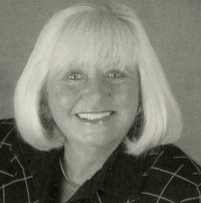

Member of the Massachusetts House of Representatives from the 11th Plymouth district
- In office 1995 – January 2013
- Succeeded by: Claire D. Cronin

Personal details
- Party: Democratic
- Spouse: Robert
- Children: 2
- Education: Emmanuel College

Geraldine Creedon is a former representative in the Massachusetts House of Representatives for the 11th Plymouth district, consisting of precincts 1, 2, 4 and 5, of the town of Easton, in the county of Bristol; and precincts A and C of ward 1, precinct A of ward 2, and all precincts of ward 7, of the city of Brockton, in the county of Plymouth. Creedon held this position from 1995 until 2013.

== Early life and career ==
Creedon received her bachelor's degree from Emmanuel College in 1967. She previously served as a member of the Brockton City Council (1992–1995), and was the president of that body in 1994.

== Political career ==
Creedon was first elected to the Massachusetts House of Representatives in a 1995 special election for the 11th Plymouth district. Her first contested race for the seat took place in 2004 when she defeated Marissa Lima in the general election. Creedon has been reelected to the seat eight times. In February 2012, Creedon announced that she would retire from the legislature, and not run for reelection that November. She was succeeded by Democrat Claire D. Cronin.

Creedon served on the Joint Committee on Consumer Protection and Professional Licensure, Joint Committee on Education, Joint Committee on Ways and Means, Joint Committee on Public Service, and the House Committee on Ways and Means.

She voted to authorize casino gambling in Massachusetts, and also voted in favor of pension reform.

== Personal life ==
Creedon is married to Robert S. Creedon Jr. Her brother-in-law is Michael Creedon. Both Robert and Michael have served in both houses of the Massachusetts General Court. Geraldine Creedon and her husband have two children.
