= Claire D. Cronin =

American politician and diplomat (born 1960)

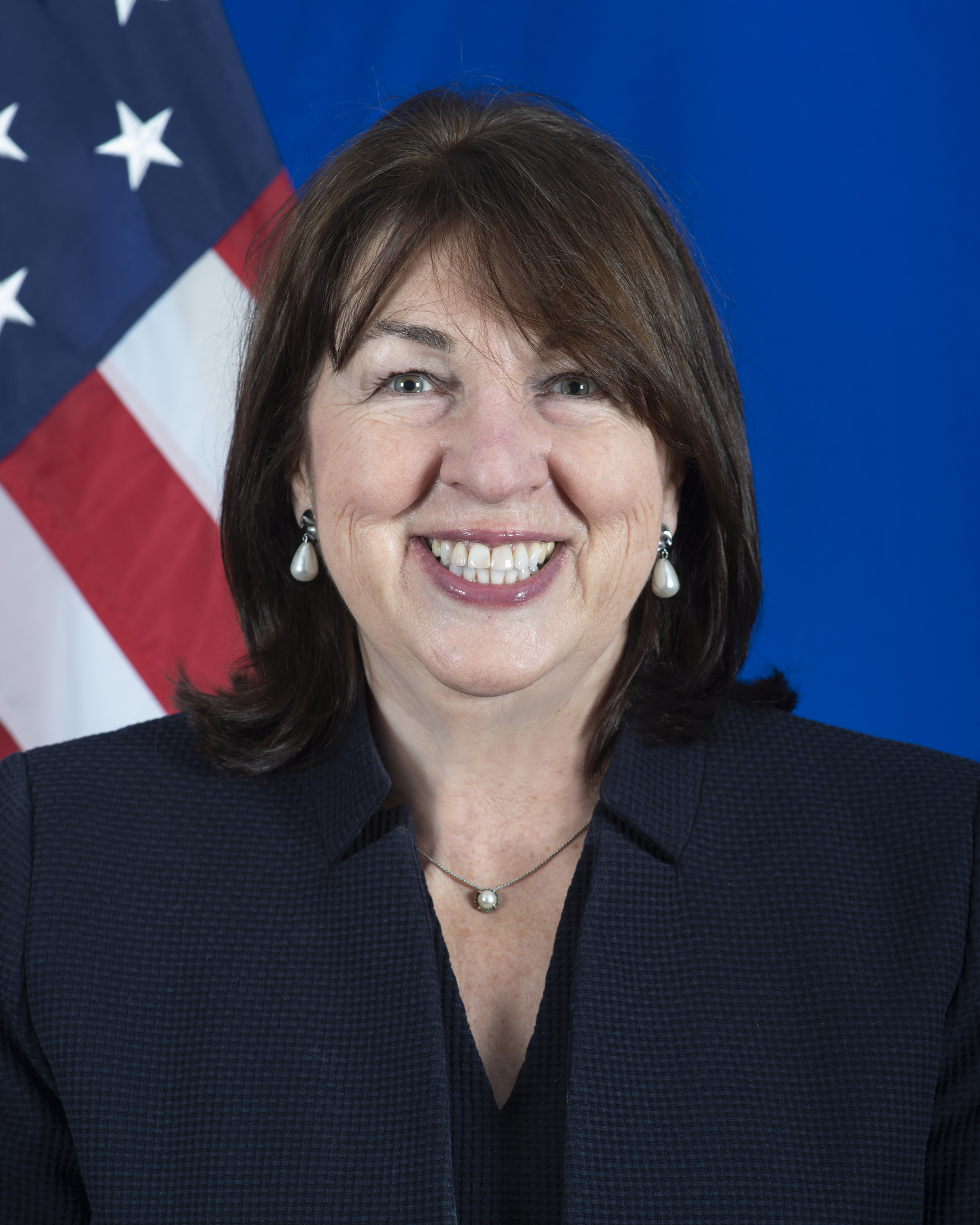
- Official portrait, 2022

25th United States Ambassador to Ireland
- In office February 10, 2022 – January 20, 2025
- President: Joe Biden
- Preceded by: Edward Crawford
- Succeeded by: Edward Sharp Walsh

Majority Leader of the Massachusetts House of Representatives
- In office February 11, 2021 – January 18, 2022
- Preceded by: Ron Mariano
- Succeeded by: Michael Moran

Member of the Massachusetts House of Representatives from the 11th Plymouth district
- In office January 2013 – January 18, 2022
- Preceded by: Geraldine Creedon
- Succeeded by: Rita Mendes

Personal details
- Born: Claire McLaughlin; January 29, 1960 (age 66) Brockton, Massachusetts, U.S.
- Party: Democratic
- Spouse: Ray Cronin
- Children: 2
- Education: Stonehill College (BA); Suffolk University (JD)
- Website: Official website

Claire D. Cronin (born January 29, 1960) is an American attorney, politician, and diplomat who served as the United States ambassador to Ireland from 2022 to 2025. She previously served as a member of the Massachusetts House of Representatives from the 11th Plymouth district from 2013 to 2022. Cronin was the first woman to serve as House Majority Leader in Massachusetts.

In May 2021, President Joe Biden was reported to have selected Cronin as the United States ambassador to Ireland. On June 23, 2021, the nomination was officially announced. On January 19, 2022, Cronin was sworn in as the United States Ambassador to Ireland in the Massachusetts House of Representatives chamber. She presented her credentials to the President of Ireland, Michael D. Higgins, on February 10, 2022.

== Early life and education ==
Born Claire McLaughlin in Brockton, Massachusetts to Phyllis Lucey and James Daniel McLaughlin. Her father was the son of an Irish immigrant from the Inishowen Peninsula in Northern County Donegal and all four of Phyllis Lucey's grandparents were Irish. Cronin graduated from Brockton High School in 1978 and attended Stonehill College in Easton and graduated with a bachelor's degree in Political Science in 1982. She went on to earn a Juris Doctor from Suffolk University Law School in 1985.

== Career ==
=== Early career ===
Cronin was admitted to the Massachusetts Bar Association in 1985 and is admitted to practice in the U.S. District Court and before the United States Supreme Court.

Cronin has maintained a law practice in Brockton. She was formerly a member of the Brockton Democratic City Committee, and previously served on the Easton Democratic Town Committee and Democratic State Committee.

Cronin served as mediator in the Catholic Archdiocese of Boston sex abuse scandal settlement.

=== Massachusetts House of Representatives ===
On February 14, 2012, Cronin announced her candidacy for a newly redistricted seat formerly held by long-time State Representative Geraldine Creedon. She won a four-way Democratic primary with 33% of the vote, defeating Brockton Councilors-at-Large Robert Sullivan and Jass Stewart, and Southeast Regional School Committee member Mark Linde. In the general election, Cronin defeated Republican Dan Murphy.

In the legislature, Cronin serves as the Majority Leader of the Massachusetts House of Representatives. Prior to assuming this role, Cronin served as the chair of the Joint Committee on the Judiciary. She is the first woman in the history of the Massachusetts House of Representatives to serve as chair of the House Judiciary Committee. In her role as chair, Cronin was the architect of the comprehensive House criminal justice reform bill and was the lead negotiator for the House of Representatives during the conference committee. This sweeping piece of legislation marked the most extensive reform of the state's criminal justice system in decades.

Cronin previously served as the vice-chair of the Joint Committee on the Judiciary, and as a member of the House Committee on Ways and Means, the Joint Committee on Veterans and Federal Affairs, the Joint Committee on Economic Development and Emerging Technologies, the Joint Committee on Telecommunications, Utilities and Energy, and the House Committee on Post Audit and Oversight.

Cronin announced Massachusetts' votes in the roll call at the 2020 Democratic National Convention. During the 2020 United States presidential election Cronin was a fund-raising bundler for the Joe Biden 2020 presidential campaign in the state of Massachusetts.

On January 18, 2022, Cronin resigned from the House, and thus vacated her position as Majority Leader.

=== U.S. Ambassador to Ireland ===
In May 2021, Cronin was reported as President Joe Biden's nominee for United States Ambassador to Ireland. On June 23, 2021, President Biden announced his intent to nominate Cronin to that position. On July 13, 2021, her nomination was sent to the United States Senate. On September 29, 2021, a hearing on her nomination was held before the Senate Foreign Relations Committee. On October 19, 2021, her nomination was reported favorably out of committee. On December 18, 2021, her nomination was confirmed by the full United States Senate in a voice vote.

On January 19, 2022, she was sworn in as the United States Ambassador to Ireland during a formal session of the Massachusetts House of Representatives. She presented her credentials to the President of Ireland, Michael D. Higgins, on February 10, 2022. In her remarks at the ceremony, Cronin noted: “President Biden entrusted me as the US Ambassador to Ireland at a very important moment. As his eyes and ears here in Ireland, I plan to engage with politicians and other stakeholders. President Biden is unequivocal in his support for the Good Friday Agreement, a historic achievement that must be protected to ensure peace and stability in Northern Ireland.”

Cronin had been scheduled to attend the in-person meeting between President of the United States Joe Biden and Taoiseach Micheál Martin at the White House on 17 March 2022, a meeting which ultimately did not occur due to Martin's own COVID diagnosis on the day. Cronin had also intended to participate in Irish-American festivities alongside Ambassador of Ireland to the United States Daniel Mulhall.

She resigned effective January 20, 2025, in anticipation of the inauguration of Donald Trump.

=== Post-ambassador career ===
In July 2025, the University of Massachusetts Amherst announced that Cronin would be joining its Mount Ida campus as a scholar-in-residence, focusing on the university's global and international initiatives.

== Personal life ==
Cronin is married to Ray Cronin, the CEO and co-founder of Club Benchmarking, a performance analytics company that assists private recreational clubs. They have two children.

== See also ==
- 2019–2020 Massachusetts legislature
- 2021–2022 Massachusetts legislature

Massachusetts House of Representatives
| Preceded by Ronald Mariano | Majority Leader of the Massachusetts House of Representatives; 2021–2022 | Succeeded by Michael Moran |
Diplomatic posts
| Preceded by Edward F. Crawford | United States Ambassador to Ireland; 2022–2025 | Succeeded by Edward Sharp Walsh |
