= Jacqueline Lewis =

American politician

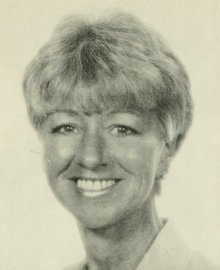
- Lewis, circa 1995

Member of the Massachusetts House of Representatives from the 8th Plymouth district
- In office 1985–1999

Personal details
- Born: March 5, 1945 (age 81) Romford, England, United Kingdom

Jacqueline Lewis (born March 5, 1945 in Romford, England) is an American Republican politician from Bridgewater, Massachusetts. She represented the 8th Plymouth district in the Massachusetts House of Representatives from 1985 to 1999.

== See also ==
- 1985-1986 Massachusetts legislature
- 1987-1988 Massachusetts legislature
- 1989-1990 Massachusetts legislature
- 1991-1992 Massachusetts legislature
- 1993-1994 Massachusetts legislature
- 1995-1996 Massachusetts legislature
- 1997-1998 Massachusetts legislature
