= Thomas J. O'Brien (Massachusetts politician) =

American politician

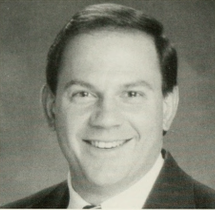
Portrait of Thomas J. O'Brien

Thomas J. O'Brien is an American politician who serves as the treasurer of Plymouth County, Massachusetts. O'Brien was first appointed in 2006 and voters returned him to the position in a win over his Republican challenger in the fall 2008 elections.

O'Brien served as the Massachusetts State Representative for the 12th Plymouth District, which includes the towns of Kingston and Plympton and parts of Plymouth, Duxbury, Halifax, and Middleborough. He is a Democrat. Elected to the Massachusetts House of Representatives in 1996, he served on a number of Committees including the Joint Committees on Tourism, Arts, and Cultural Development, Healthcare Financing, and Municipalities and Regional Government. He also served on several caucuses within the House of Representatives, including the Elder Caucus, the Children's Caucus, the Southeastern Massachusetts Legislators' Caucus, the Coastal Caucus, and the Boating Caucus. During his tenure in the House of Representatives, O'Brien maintained a perfect voting record and cast more than 3,500 consecutive roll call votes.

O'Brien was named Legislator of the Year by the Massachusetts Town Clerk's Association in both 2000 and 2003, named "Environmental Hero" by the South Shore Recycling Cooperative in 2000, named Legislator of the Year by the Massachusetts Chapter of the National Arthritis Foundation for 2002, bestowed the Library Advocacy Award from the Massachusetts Library Association in 2002, and the Legislative Leadership Award from the Cape Cod Cranberry Growers Association in 2003.

As a State Representative, O'Brien introduced bills providing an incentive for the motion picture industry to come to Massachusetts, to assist unenrolled voters, to offer an early retirement option for teachers, and to provide for baby safe havens in the Commonwealth. During most of his tenure, he was the only Eagle Scout serving in the Massachusetts legislature.

O'Brien lives in Kingston with his wife Kristina and his two children. He earned a bachelor's degree from Georgetown University.

Preceded by John F. McLellan	Plymouth County Treasurer; 2006–present	Succeeded by Incumbent
Preceded by Robert Kraus	Massachusetts State Representative 12th Plymouth District; 1997–2006	Succeeded by Thomas Calter
