= Massachusetts House of Representatives' 8th Plymouth district =

American legislative district

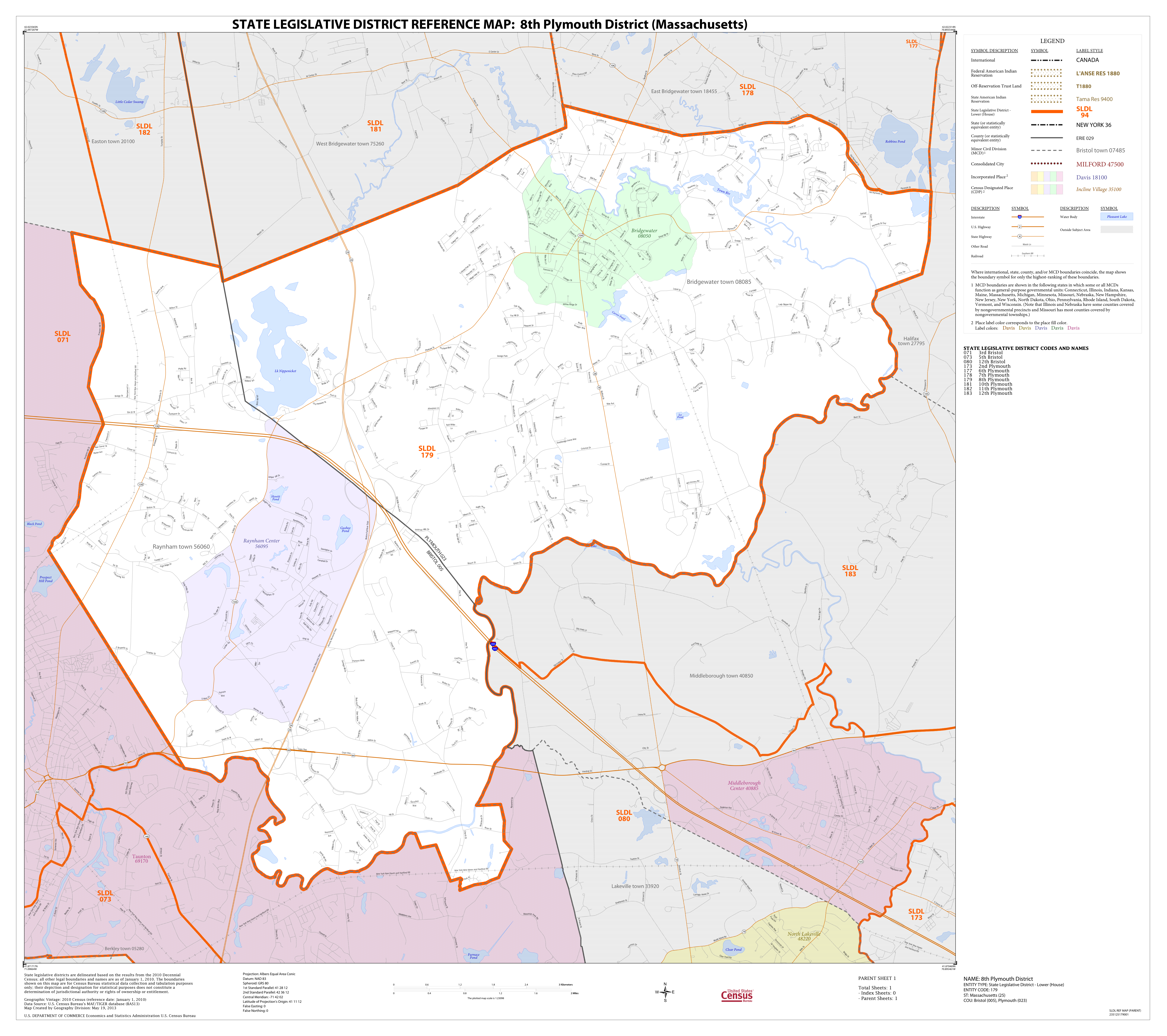
Map of Massachusetts House of Representatives' 8th Plymouth district, based on the 2010 United States census.

Massachusetts House of Representatives' 8th Plymouth district in the United States is one of 160 legislative districts included in the lower house of the Massachusetts General Court. It covers parts of Bristol County and Plymouth County. Republican Angelo D'Emilia of Bridgewater has represented the district from 2011 to 2025. Upon D'Emilia's retirement, Democrat Dennis Gallagher defeated Republican Sandra Wright in the 2024 election, becoming the first Democrat to hold the seat since 2010.

== Towns represented ==
The district includes the following localities:

- Bridgewater
- Raynham

The current district geographic boundary overlaps with that of the Massachusetts Senate's Third Bristol and Plymouth district (Raynham) and the Norfolk, Plymouth, and Bristol district (Bridgewater).

=== Former locales ===
The district previously covered:

- Lakeville, circa 1872
- Mattapoisett, circa 1872
- Rochester, circa 1872

== Representatives ==
- Jonathan H. Holmes, circa 1858
- Job T. Tobey, circa 1859
- Sidney T. Nelson, circa 1888
- C. Gerald Lucey, circa 1951
- Arthur Joseph Sheehan, circa 1951
- Peter Y. Flynn, 1975-1999
- David Flynn, 1999-2011
- Angelo L. D'Emilia, 2011-2025
- Dennis C. Gallagher, 2025–Present

== Election results ==
=== 2024 ===
2024 Massachusetts's 8th Plymouth District
| Party | Candidate | Votes | % |
|---|---|---|---|
| Democratic | Dennis Gallagher | 10,971 | 46.26 |
| Republican | Sandra Wright | 10,749 | 45.32 |
| Write-in | | 6 | 0.02 |
| Blank ballots | | 1,990 | 8.4% |
| Total votes | | 23,716 | 100.0 |
| Democratic gain from Republican | | Swing | D+8.18 |

== See also ==
- List of Massachusetts House of Representatives elections
- Other Plymouth County districts of the Massachusetts House of Representatives: 1st, 2nd, 3rd, 4th, 5th, 6th, 7th, 9th, 10th, 11th, 12th
- List of Massachusetts General Courts
- List of former districts of the Massachusetts House of Representatives

== Images ==
Portraits of legislators

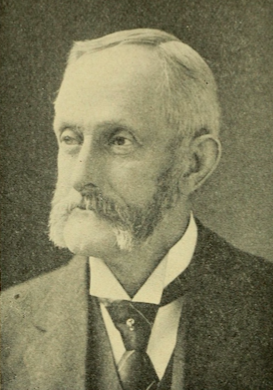
Roland Keith

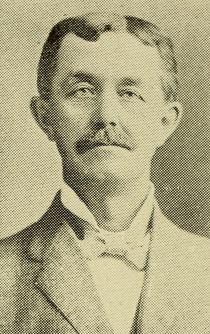
Eddy Dunbar

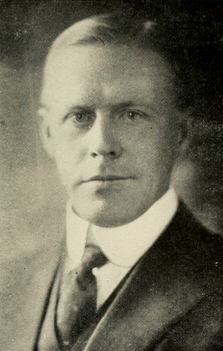
Adolph Johnson

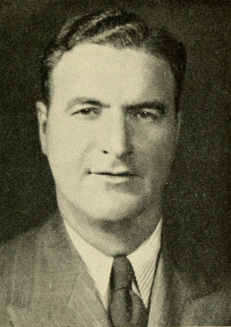
Arthur Sheehan

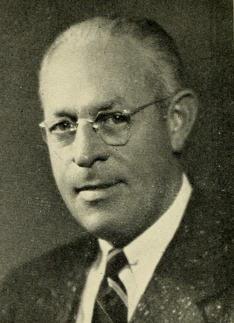
Harvey Iris

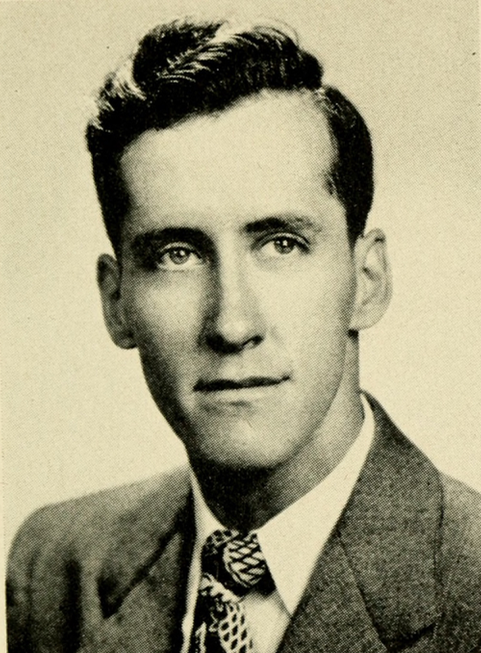
James Lawton

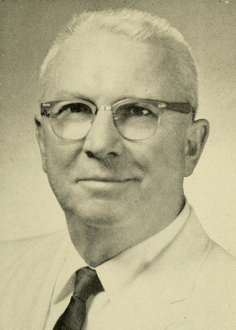
Karl Nordin

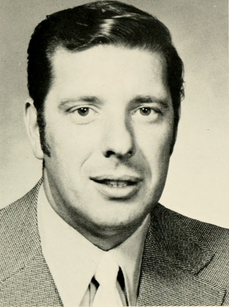
Peter Flynn

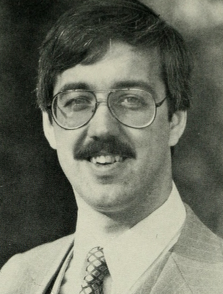
Allan Chiocca

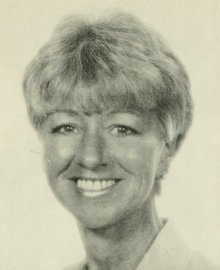
Jacqueline Lewis

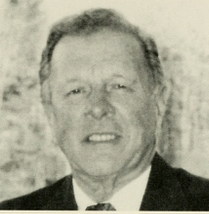
David Flynn
