= Robert S. Creedon Jr. =

American politician

Robert Creedon
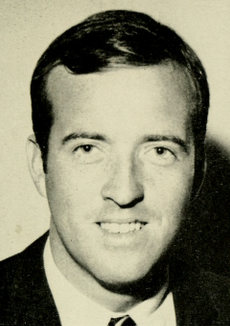

Member of the Massachusetts Senate from the 2nd Plymouth and Bristol district district
- In office 1997–2008
- Preceded by: Michael C. Creedon
- Succeeded by: Thomas P. Kennedy

Personal details
- Born: November 13, 1942 (age 83) Massachusetts, U.S.
- Party: Democratic
- Spouse: Geraldine

Robert Stanton Creedon Jr. (born November 13, 1942) is an American politician.

Creedon attended Boston College as an undergraduate, and earned a degree from the Boston College Law School in 1967. He was a member of the Massachusetts House of Representatives from 1968 to 1972, serving the 11th Plymouth district. Between 1974 and 1977, Creedon was a member of the Brockton City Council. He contested his first Massachusetts Senate election in 1996, and won his final state senate election in 2006, all for the 2nd Plymouth and Bristol district. In 2008, 2012, and 2018, Creedon was elected Plymouth County clerk of court.

Creedon's brother Michael and his wife Geraldine have also served on the Massachusetts House of Representatives.
