= Michael Moran (Massachusetts politician) =

American state legislator

Mike Moran
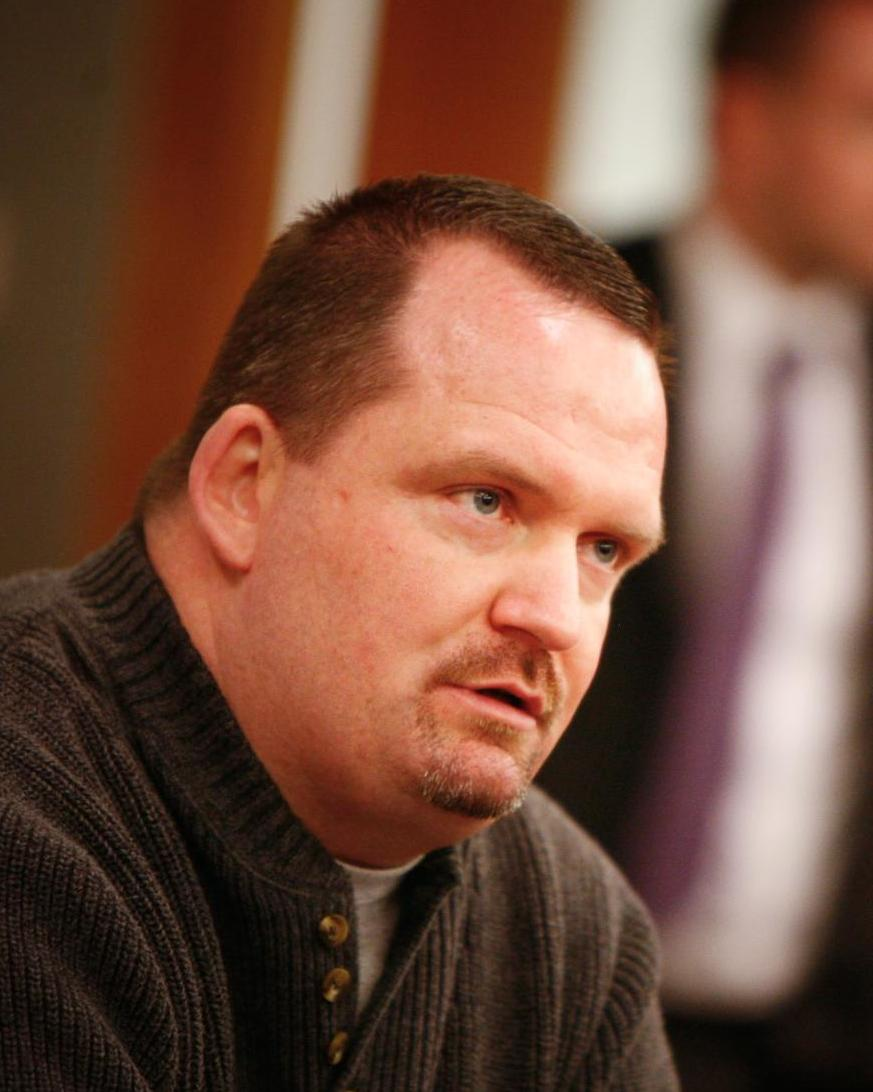
- Moran in 2012

Majority Leader of the Massachusetts House of Representatives
- Incumbent
- Assumed office February 10, 2023
- Preceded by: Claire D. Cronin

Member of the Massachusetts House of Representatives from the 18th Suffolk district
- Incumbent
- Assumed office April 2005
- Preceded by: Brian P. Golden

Personal details
- Born: February 23, 1971 (age 55)
- Party: Democratic
- Education: University of Massachusetts, Boston (BS)

Michael J. Moran (born February 23, 1971) is an American state legislator serving in the Massachusetts House of Representatives. He is the House Majority Leader, having formerly served as the Assistant Majority Leader. He is also a Brighton resident and a member of the Democratic Party.

Moran was first elected to the chamber in a special election in April 2005.

== See also ==
- 2019–2020 Massachusetts legislature
- 2021–2022 Massachusetts legislature

Massachusetts House of Representatives
Preceded by Claire D. Cronin	Majority Leader of the Massachusetts House of Representatives; 2023–present	Incumbent
