= Linda Teagan =

American politician

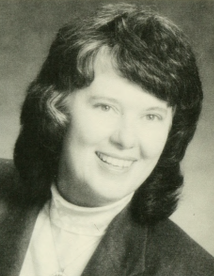

Member of the Massachusetts House of Representatives from the 1st Plymouth District
- In office 1995–1997
- Preceded by: Peter Forman
- Succeeded by: Joseph Gallitano

Personal details
- Born: May 13, 1944 (age 82) Newton, Massachusetts
- Party: Republican
- Education: Boston University; Boston University School of Law
- Occupation: Attorney; Politician

Linda C. Teagan (born May 13, 1944 in Newton, Massachusetts) is an American attorney and politician who represented the 1st Plymouth District in the Massachusetts House of Representatives from 1995 to 1997 and was a member of the Plymouth, Massachusetts board of selectmen from 1993 to 1995 and again from 1998 to 1999
