= Mary Jeanette Murray =

American politician

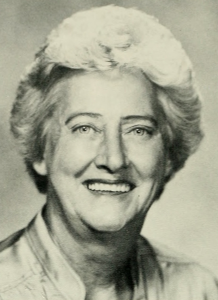
- Murray in 1983

Member of the Massachusetts House of Representatives from the 3rd Plymouth district
- In office 1977–2001

Personal details
- Born: December 24, 1924 Cohasset, Massachusetts
- Died: October 23, 2006 (aged 81)

Mary Jeanette Murray (December 24, 1924 — October 23, 2006) was an American Republican politician from Cohasset, Massachusetts. She represented the 3rd Plymouth district in the Massachusetts House of Representatives from 1977 to 2001.

Murray died on October 23, 2006.

== See also ==
- 1977-1978 Massachusetts legislature
