= Caroline Stouffer =

American politician

Member of the Massachusetts House of Representatives from the First Plymouth district
- In office 1977–1978

Caroline Stouffer is an American Democratic politician from Hingham, Massachusetts. She represented the First Plymouth district in the Massachusetts House of Representatives from 1977 to 1978.
