= Janet W. O'Brien =

American politician

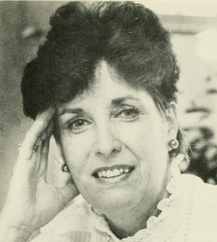

Member of the Massachusetts House of Representatives from the 5th Plymouth district
- In office 1991–1999

Personal details
- Education: Tufts University (BA); Harvard University (MPA)

Janet W. O'Brien is an American Democratic politician from Hanover, Massachusetts. She represented the 5th Plymouth district in the Massachusetts House of Representatives from 1991 to 1999.

== See also ==
- 1991-1992 Massachusetts legislature
- 1993-1994 Massachusetts legislature
- 1995-1996 Massachusetts legislature
- 1997-1998 Massachusetts legislature
