= Joseph Gallitano =

American politician

Member of the Massachusetts House of Representatives from the 1st Plymouth District
- In office 1997–1999
- Preceded by: Linda Teagan
- Succeeded by: Vinny deMacedo

Personal details
- Born: April 12, 1946 Hackensack, New Jersey
- Died: November 21, 2017 (aged 71) Sagamore Beach, Massachusetts
- Party: Democratic
- Education: Boston University; New England School of Law
- Occupation: Attorney; Politician

Joseph R. Gallitano (April 12, 1946 – November 21, 2017) was an American and politician who represented the 1st Plymouth District in the Massachusetts House of Representatives from 1997 to 1999 was and a member of the Plymouth, Massachusetts board of selectmen from 1979 to 1982

Gallitano was born in Hackensack, New Jersey, and graduated from Bogota High School. He attended the Boston University College of Communication where he majored in Public Relations, ran track and rowed crew. After college, he enlisted in the United States Navy and served during the Vietnam War, and he continued serving in the Naval reserves until being honorably discharged in 1972.

After military service, he attended law school at the New England School of Law. He practiced law in Plymouth, Massachusetts for 43 years specializing in labor and employment, governmental relations, land use, and estates and trusts law.

After unsuccessful campaigns in 1980 and 1994, when he won the Democratic primary but lost the general election, Gallitano was elected to the Massachusetts State Representative for the First Plymouth District in 1996. He served 2 years and lost re-election by 11 votes in 1998. He was appointed the first House Historian of the Massachusetts State House. He also served as a Selectman for the town of Plymouth from 1979 to 1982 and was appointed town counsel for the town of Kingston.
