= Ron Mariano =

Massachusetts politician (born 1946)

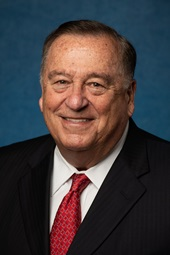

86th Speaker of the Massachusetts House of Representatives
- Incumbent
- Assumed office December 30, 2020
- Preceded by: Robert DeLeo

Majority Leader of the Massachusetts House of Representatives
- In office January 28, 2011 – December 30, 2020
- Preceded by: James Vallee
- Succeeded by: Claire D. Cronin

Member of the Massachusetts House of Representatives from the 3rd Norfolk district
- Incumbent
- Assumed office December 1991
- Preceded by: Robert A. Cerasoli

Personal details
- Born: October 31, 1946 (age 79) Quincy, Massachusetts, U.S.
- Party: Democratic
- Spouse: Eve Powell
- Education: Northeastern University (BS); University of Massachusetts, Boston (MEd)

Ronald Joseph Mariano (born October 31, 1946) is an American politician currently serving as the Speaker of the Massachusetts House of Representatives. A Democrat from Quincy, he was first elected to the House in a December 1991 special election. He was appointed assistant majority leader in February 2009 and majority leader in January 2011 by then-speaker Robert DeLeo, who he succeeded as speaker upon DeLeo's retirement in 2020. He represents the 3rd Norfolk district.

== Life and career ==
Mariano was born and raised in Quincy, where he attended public school. He received his B.S. from Northeastern University in Boston and his M.Ed. from the University of Massachusetts Boston. He became a teacher and was elected to the Quincy School Committee, where he served from 1989 to 2009. He also served on the Ward 2 Democratic Committee, the Norfolk County Advisory Board, and the Quincy College Board of Governors.

In January 2023, Mariano was reelected to a second term as Speaker of the Massachusetts House of Representatives. His priorities for the 193rd Massachusetts General Court include child care affordability, public transport reliability, and oversight of hospital mergers and acquisitions. Mariano also outlined a focus on revising Massachusetts' state law to comply with the Supreme Court's 2022 ruling in NYSRPA v. Bruen, which declared may-issue permitting for firearms unconstitutional, as opposed to shall-issue permits.

In October 2023, Mariano indicated that he intends to run for Speaker of the Massachusetts House of Representatives during the 2025–2026 legislative session.

== Awards ==
From 1997 to 2000, Mariano served as Vice Chair of the Massachusetts House of Representative's Joint Committee on Insurance, becoming Chair in 2001. In 2005, he became chair of successor Joint Committee on Financial Services. In these roles, he oversaw the 2006 Massachusetts health care reform and 2008 auto insurance deregulation, for which he was received the 2008 Insurance Professional of the Year Award.

Mariano was the 2014 recipient of the Quincy Parks Conservatory's Charles Francis Award. In December 2021, Mariano received the Norman B. Leventhal Excellence in City Building Award in the environment category. Mariano was the 2022 recipient of the Massachusetts Immigrant & Refugee Advocacy Coalition's Change Maker Award. In June 2023, Mariano was awarded the Legislative Champion Award by the Biotechnology Innovation Organization for supporting patient advocacy.

Massachusetts House of Representatives
Preceded by James Vallee	Majority Leader of the Massachusetts House of Representatives; 2011–2020	Succeeded by Claire D. Cronin
Political offices
Preceded by Robert DeLeo	Speaker of the Massachusetts House of Representatives; 2020–present	Incumbent
