= Massasoit Community College =

Public community college in Brockton, Massachusetts, US

- Motto: Endurance and Faith
- Type: Public community college
- Established: 1966; 60 years ago
- Accreditation: NECHE
- President: Bill Mitchell
- Total staff: 900+ (Full- and Part-Time)
- Students: 5,707 (Spring 2025)
- Location: Brockton, Middleboro, and Canton, Massachusetts, United States; 42.076704°N 70.986464°W
- Campus: Urban, 100 acres (0.40 km^{2}) Suburban, 18 acres
- Nickname: Warriors
- Website: www.massasoit.edu

Massasoit Community College (Massasoit) is a public community college in Brockton, Massachusetts. It was founded in 1966 and named for Massasoit, the Great Sachem of the Wampanoag. Massasoit Community College is accredited by the New England Commission of Higher Education. It maintains a campus in Canton, and locations in Middleboro and Downtown Brockton.

== History ==
Massasoit was founded as one of several community colleges established in Massachusetts after Governor Foster Furcolo signed into law an act that established a system for community colleges in the Commonwealth. Though plans were in place to locate Massasoit in Brockton, the College opened temporarily in North Abington, later adding locations in West Bridgewater and Duxbury, while land was secured in Brockton. When classes began in September 1966, Massasoit enrolled 358 students instructed by 22 faculty. The first president was John Musselman.

Ground broke on the 100-acre Brockton Campus in October 1969. The campus was completed in two phases by 1978. Throughout the 1970s, Massasoit grew in terms of students, faculty and staff, programming, resources, and athletics. Local control of Massasoit was granted to its Board of Trustees in 1981.

The 1980s and 1990s were additional periods of significant growth for Massasoit under President Gerard Burke. During his presidency, Massasoit merged with the Blue Hills Technical Institute in 1985, which became the Canton Campus.

Massasoit later added its Middleborough Center in 2010 and opened a Downton Brockton Location - home to the Future of Work Institute - in 2023.

Beginning in 2023, Massasoit began offering "Free College" under the Commonwealth's MassReconnect program. Originally for those ages 25 and older, free college options were expanded in 2024. Massasoit saw significant increases in enrollment after the COVID-19 pandemic and the implementation of Free College, reaching over 6,100 students by the Fall of 2025.

== Academics ==
Massasoit offers more than 60 associate degree and certificate programs across its three locations. Areas of study include business, public service, healthcare, liberal arts, and STEM. Most classes and programs are completed on its 100-acre Brockton Campus, which includes athletics facilities (Asiaf Field House), the Buckley Performing Arts Center, several classroom and laboratory buildings, a dining hall, library, and more.

Several specialty workforce and professional programs are offered by Massasoit at its Canton Campus, including diesel technology, veterinary technology, dental assisting, HVAC, and others. Of its enrollment across divisions, Health Sciences is the largest, and several of its programs have licensure exam past rates at 97% and 100%.

In 2026, Massasoit opened a new Science Building that includes new lab and classroom spaces to advance STEM education, and as home for its STEM research program that has performed ecological research and studied pollinators since 2014.

== Athletics & Student Life ==
Massasoit is a member of the NJCAA, in which it has won three national titles: Men's Division II Baseball (1993) and Men's Soccer (1986 and 1987). The college currently offers varsity sports in women's and men's soccer, women's and men's basketball, softball, and baseball. In the past, it has also offered hockey, golf, tennis, and women's volleyball programs.

Massasoit is home to a chapter of Phi Theta Kappa, was recognized with the 2026-2027 Military Friendly Schools Gold Designation, offers a Food Pantry for students and the community, and has student government and many other clubs. The Massasoit Theatre Company hosts multiple shows a year.

== Faculty and Staff ==
- As of Fall 2025, there were 94 full-time faculty and 519 part-time faculty. 23% of full-time faculty had doctoral degrees, and 10% were graduates of Massasoit.
- As of Fall 2025, Massasoit employed 246 full-time administrators, professionals, clerical and maintenance workers, and 333 part-time positions.
- The college reported a 12:1 student-to-faculty ratio.

== Notable alumni ==
- Christine E. Canavan (A.S. 1983), member of the Massachusetts House of Representatives (1993–2015)
- Jim Craig, member of the "Miracle on Ice" USA hockey team in the 1980 Winter Olympics, and NHL player from 1979 to 1984; transferred to Boston University after his freshman year
- Alex Karalexis, soccer player; professional MMA fighter
- Thomas P. Kennedy, Massachusetts state legislator
- Rita Mendes, Massachusetts state representative
- Pamerson O. Ifill, Commissioner of Probation for Massachusetts
- Jim Mann, Major League Baseball player, 2000–2003

== See also ==
- List of colleges and universities
- List of colleges and universities in Massachusetts
- Massasoit Police
