= Ruth Provost =

American politician (born 1949)

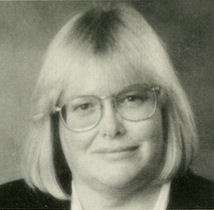

Member of the Massachusetts House of Representatives from the 2nd Plymouth District
- In office 1997–2003
- Preceded by: Charles Decas
- Succeeded by: Susan Williams Gifford

Personal details
- Born: August 9, 1949 (age 77) Boston, Massachusetts
- Party: Democratic
- Education: University of Massachusetts Amherst
- Occupation: Politician

Ruth W. Provost (born August 9, 1949 in Boston, Massachusetts) is an American politician who represented 2nd Plymouth District in the Massachusetts House of Representatives from 1997 to 2003.
