= Massachusetts House of Representatives' 9th Plymouth district =

American legislative district

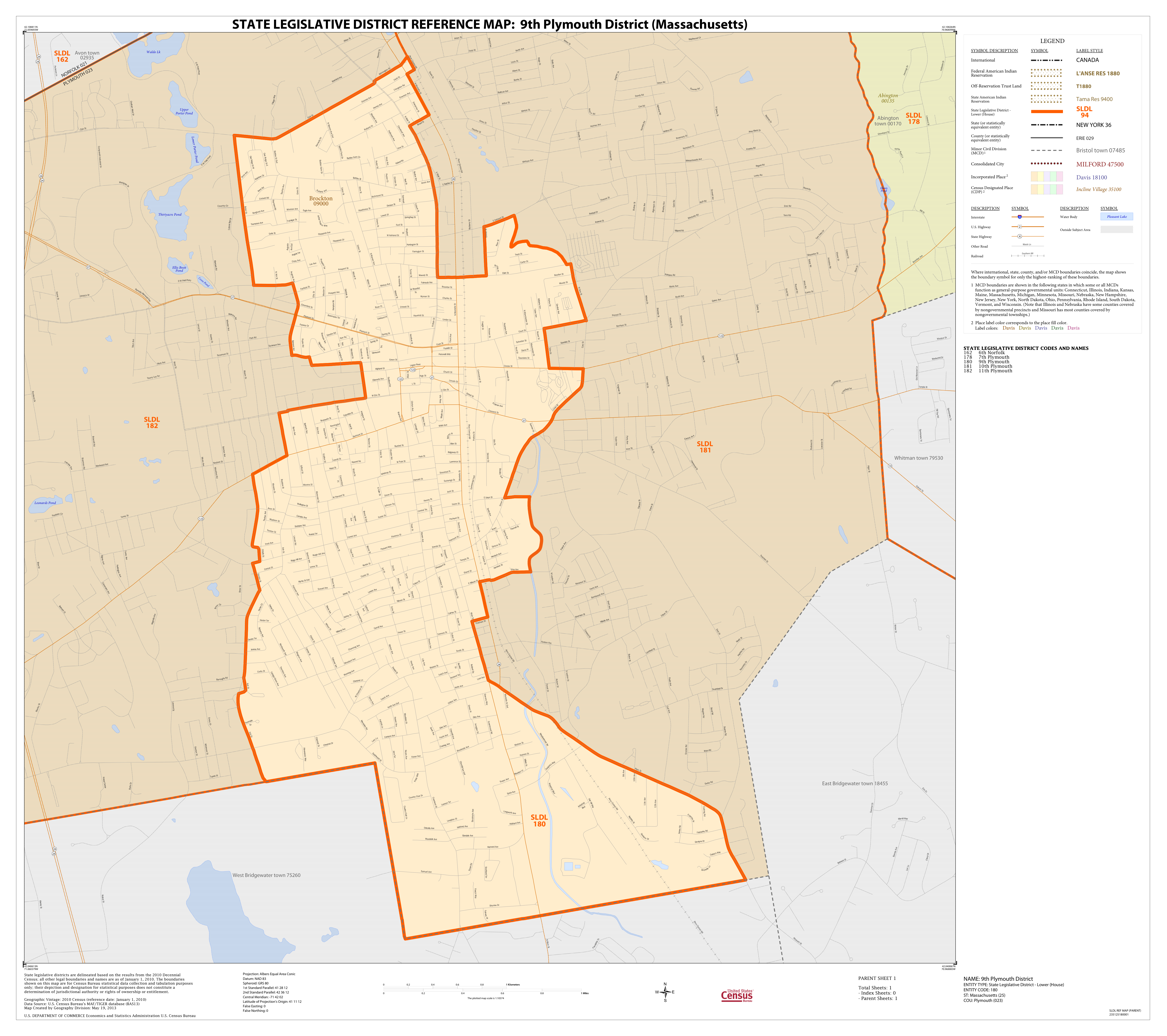
Map of Massachusetts House of Representatives' 9th Plymouth district, based on the 2010 United States census.

Massachusetts House of Representatives' 9th Plymouth district in the United States is one of 160 legislative districts included in the lower house of the Massachusetts General Court. It covers part of the city of Brockton in Plymouth County. Democrat Bridget Plouffe has represented the district since 2025.

The current district geographic boundary overlaps with that of the Massachusetts Senate's 2nd Plymouth and Bristol district.

== Representatives ==
- Foster Tinkham, circa 1858
- Everett Robinson, circa 1859
- George M. Hooper, circa 1888
- Emil K. Steele, circa 1920
- John George Asiaf, circa 1951
- Robert S. Teahan, circa 1975

Thomas P. Kennedy served as a State Representative for the 9th Plymouth District from 1983 to 2009

- Gerry Cassidy, 2017–2025
- Bridget Plouffe, 2025-Present

== Former locale ==
The district previously covered Middleborough, circa 1872.

== See also ==
- List of Massachusetts House of Representatives elections
- Other Plymouth County districts of the Massachusetts House of Representatives: 1st, 2nd, 3rd, 4th, 5th, 6th, 7th, 8th, 10th, 11th, 12th
- List of Massachusetts General Courts
- List of former districts of the Massachusetts House of Representatives

== Images ==
Portraits of legislators

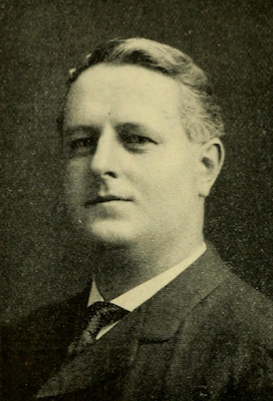
Edward Gilmore

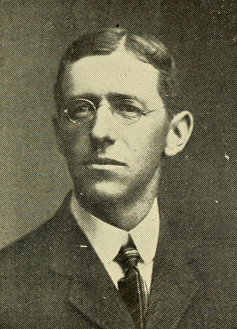
Walter Packard

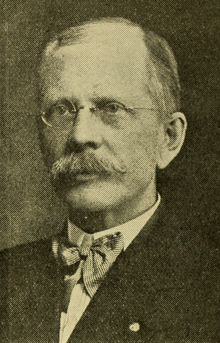
Charles Hillberg

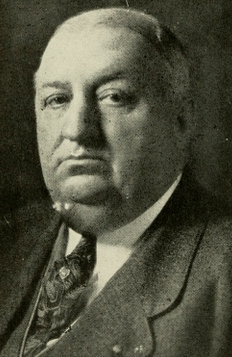
John Whalen

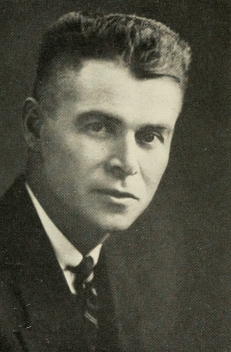
Joseph Downey

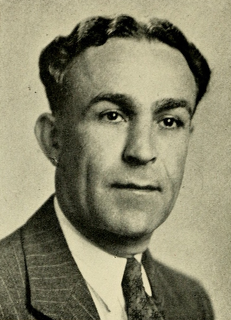
John Asiaf

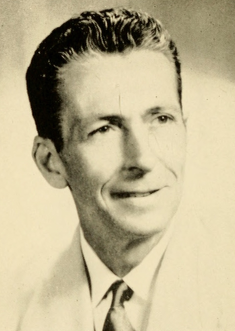
James Downey

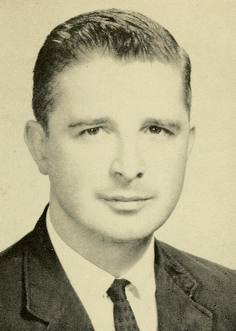
Paul Maurice Murphy

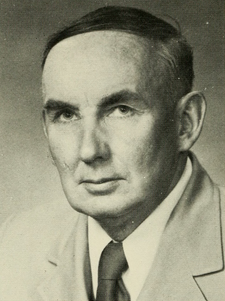
Robert Teahan

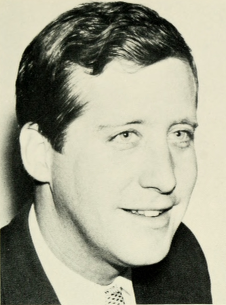
Mark Lawton

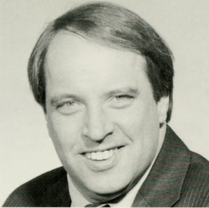
Thomas P. Kennedy
