= Massachusetts House of Representatives' 10th Plymouth district =

American legislative district

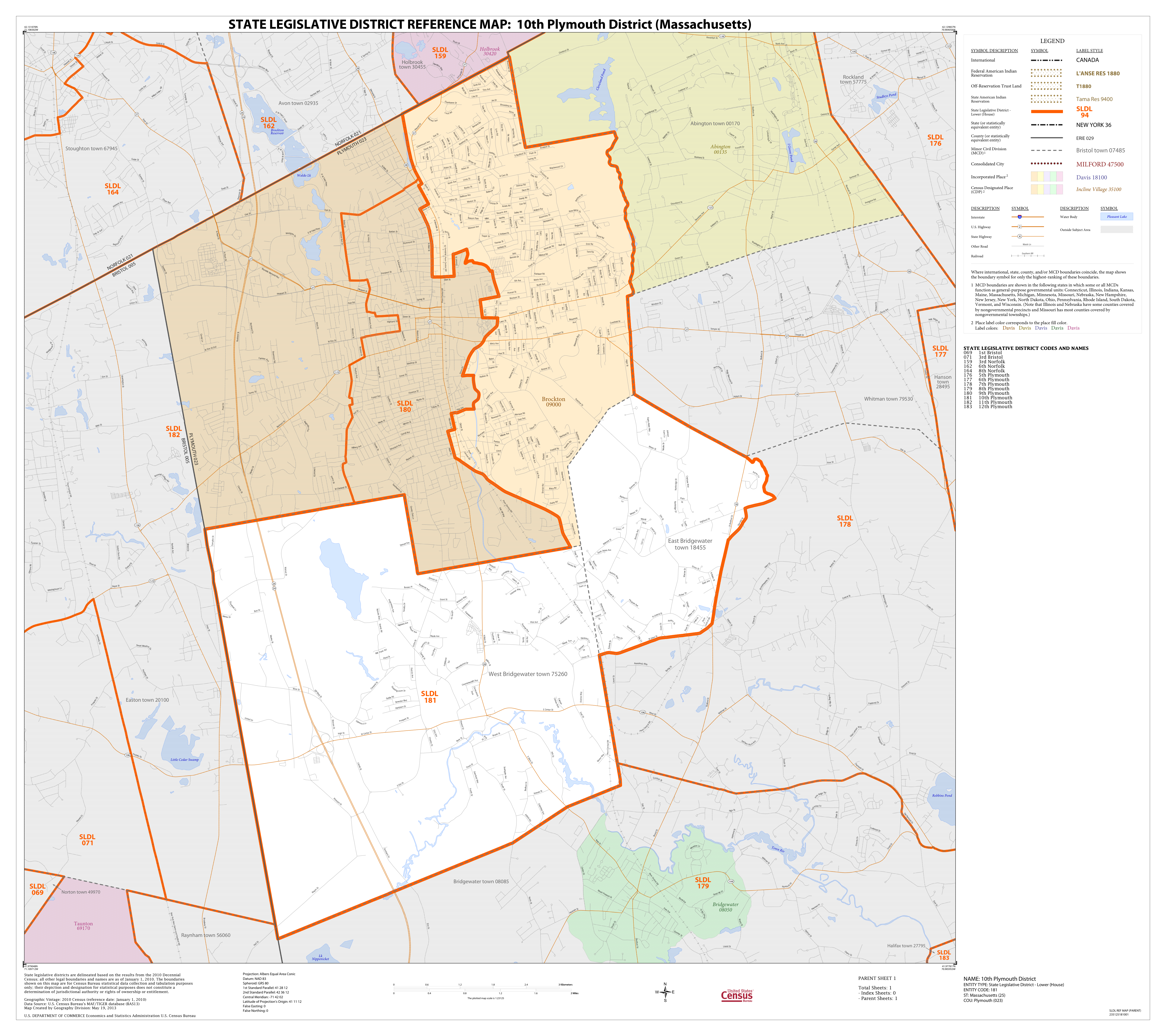
Map of Massachusetts House of Representatives' 10th Plymouth district, based on the 2010 United States census.

Massachusetts House of Representatives' 10th Plymouth district in the United States is one of 160 legislative districts included in the lower house of the Massachusetts General Court. It covers part of Plymouth County. Democrat Michelle DuBois of Brockton has represented the district since 2015.

== Locales represented ==
The district includes the following localities:

- part of Brockton
- part of East Bridgewater
- West Bridgewater

The current district geographic boundary overlaps with those of the Massachusetts Senate's Norfolk, Bristol and Plymouth district and 2nd Plymouth and Bristol district.

=== Former locale ===
The district previously covered Bridgewater, circa 1872.

== Representatives ==
- Elbridge Keith, circa 1858
- Jarvis D. Burrell, circa 1859
- Patrick McCarthy, circa 1888
- William B. Baldwin, circa 1920
- E. Gerry Brown, 1920
- Sylvia Donaldson, 1923–1930
- Philip W. Johnston, circa 1975
- John F. Cruz 1991–1992
- Christine Canavan 1993–2015
- Michelle DuBois, 2015–

== See also ==
- List of Massachusetts House of Representatives elections
- Other Plymouth County districts of the Massachusetts House of Representatives: 1st, 2nd, 3rd, 4th, 5th, 6th, 7th, 8th, 9th, 11th, 12th
- List of Massachusetts General Courts
- List of former districts of the Massachusetts House of Representatives

== Images ==
Portraits of legislators

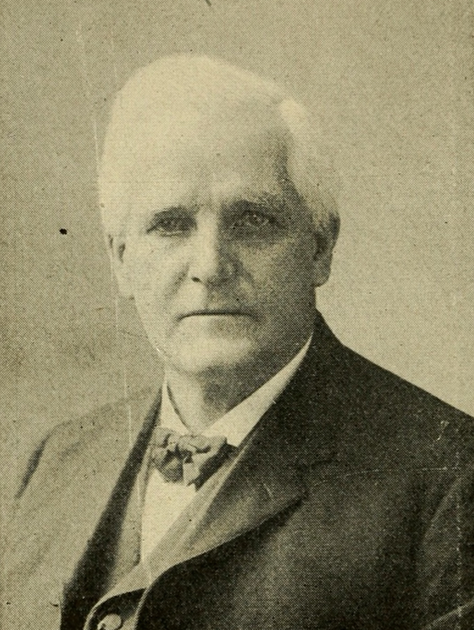
Portus Hancock

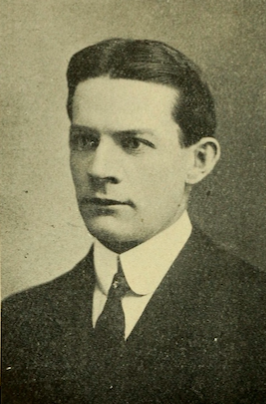
Timothy Meade

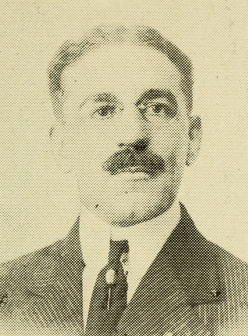
Herbert Amiel Bartlett

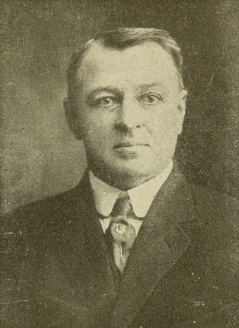
William Baldwin

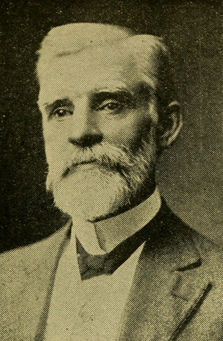
Ezra Clark

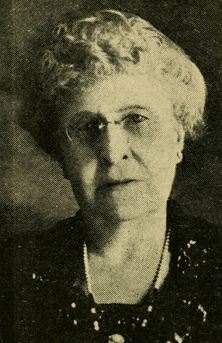
M. Sylvia Donaldson

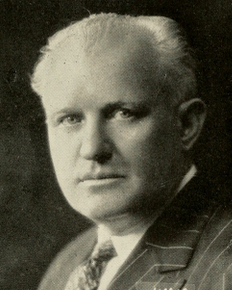
John Lyons

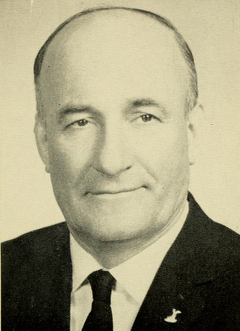
Peter Asiaf

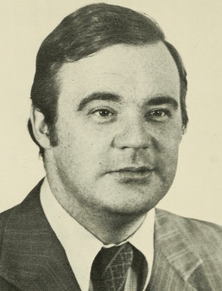
Philip Johnston

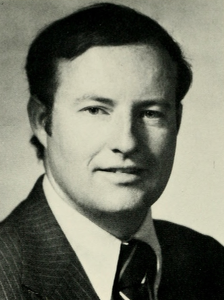
Michael Creedon

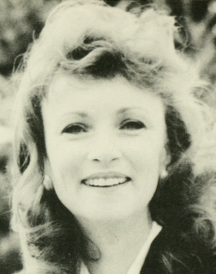
Christine Canavan

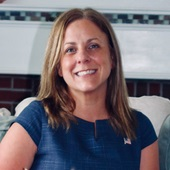
Michelle DuBois
