= Massachusetts House of Representatives' 11th Plymouth district =

American legislative district

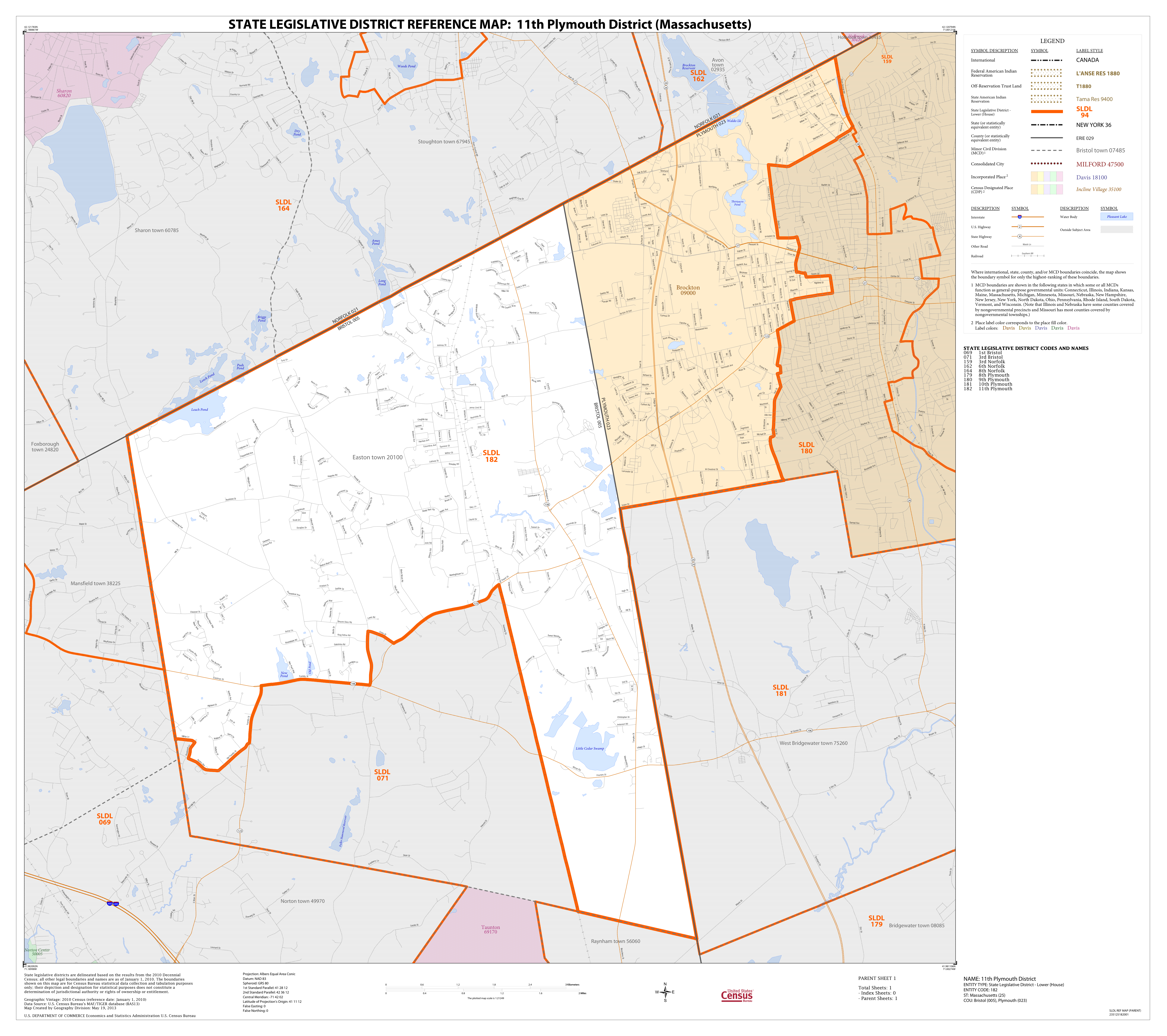
Map of Massachusetts House of Representatives' 11th Plymouth district, based on the 2010 United States census.

Massachusetts House of Representatives' 11th Plymouth district in the United States is one of 160 legislative districts included in the lower house of the Massachusetts General Court. It covers parts of Bristol County and Plymouth County. Democrat Rita Mendes of Easton has represented the district since 2023.

== Towns represented ==
The district includes the following localities:

- part of Brockton
- part of Easton

The current district geographic boundary overlaps with those of the Massachusetts Senate's Norfolk, Bristol and Plymouth district and 2nd Plymouth and Bristol district.

=== Former locales ===
The district previously covered:

- East Bridgewater, circa 1872
- North Bridgewater, circa 1872

== Representatives ==
- Paul Couch, circa 1858
- Benj W. Harris, circa 1858
- Thomas Conant, circa 1859
- Edward Southworth, Jr, circa 1859
- A. Cranston Thompson, circa 1888
- Frank A. Manning, 1914–1920
- Geraldine Creedon, 1995–2012
- Claire D. Cronin, 2013-2022
- Rita Mendes, 2023–present

== See also ==
- List of Massachusetts House of Representatives elections
- Other Plymouth County districts of the Massachusetts House of Representatives: 1st, 2nd, 3rd, 4th, 5th, 6th, 7th, 8th, 9th, 10th, 12th
- List of Massachusetts General Courts
- List of former districts of the Massachusetts House of Representatives

== Images ==
Portraits of legislators

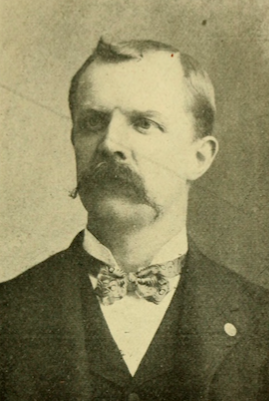
George Swan

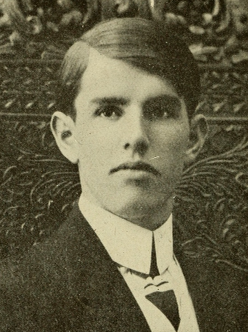
Frank Manning

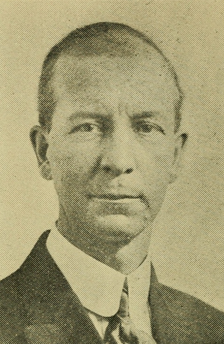
Frank Eaton

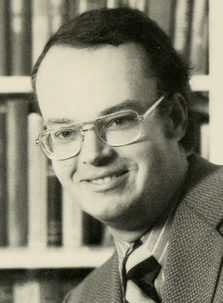
Gary Jones

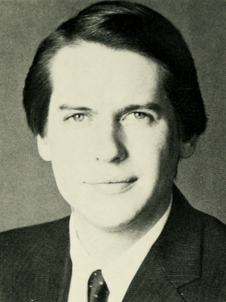
Francis Mara

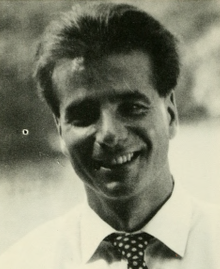
Louis Angelo

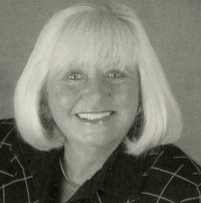
Geraldine Creedon
