= John F. Cruz =

American politician

John F. Cruz is an American politician and perennial candidate.

Cruz was elected to a single term on the Massachusetts House of Representatives, as a Republican legislator from 10th Plymouth district. He ran for the same district in 1992, 1994, 2010, 2014, and 2018, losing each time.
