= Frank N. Costa =

American politician

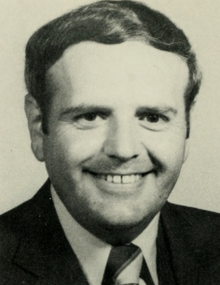

Member of the Massachusetts House of Representatives from the 1st Berkshire District
- In office 1983–1987
- Preceded by: Frank J. Matrango
- Succeeded by: Daniel E. Bosley

Personal details
- Born: October 25, 1945 Fall River, Massachusetts
- Died: March 2, 1987 (aged 41) Adams, Massachusetts
- Party: Democratic
- Education: Northeast Broadcasting School; Defense Information School; North Adams State College
- Occupation: News reporter State legislator

Frank N. Costa (October 25, 1945 – March 2, 1987) was an American radio broadcaster and politician who represented the 1st Berkshire District in the Massachusetts House of Representatives from 1983 to 1987.

== Early life ==
Costa was born on October 25, 1945, in Fall River, Massachusetts. He graduated from B.M.C. Durfee High School and went on to attend the Northeast Broadcasting School (later known as the New England Institute of Art) in Boston.

== Broadcasting career ==
After graduating from NBS in 1964, Costa began his career as a newscaster at WBRL in Berlin, New Hampshire. In 1966, Costa enlisted in the United States Army. He attended the Defense Information School and managed a military and civilian news department in Panama for the United States Department of Defense. In 1968, Costa joined WMNB in North Adams, Massachusetts, as a news reporter and assistant to the general manager.

== Political career ==
Costa left WMNB in 1980 when he was elected to the Adams, Massachusetts, board of assessors. In 1982 he was elected to the Massachusetts House of Representatives. He was reelected in 1984 and chose not to run for reelection in 1986.

== Death ==
On March 2, 1987, Costa was found dead of carbon monoxide asphyxiation in his garage by his wife. Prior to his apparent suicide, Costa had openly discussed his struggle with stress and mental illness.
