= Ashley Shade (politician) =

American politician

President of the North Adams City Council
- Incumbent
- Assumed office January 1, 2026
- Preceded by: Bryan Sapienza

Member of the North Adams City Council
- Incumbent
- Assumed office January 1, 2022

Personal details
- Born: 1987 (age 38–39) New Jersey
- Party: Democratic (2023–present); Libertarian (until 2022)
- Education: Massachusetts College of Liberal Arts

Ashley Shade (born 1987) is an American politician serving as president of the North Adams City Council in Massachusetts. She is the second transgender city council president in the United States, and the first in Massachusetts.

== Early life ==
Shade moved to North Adams from New Jersey in 1991, where she was raised partially by her grandmother. She studied business administration at the Massachusetts College for Liberal Arts in North Adams. After graduating, she played semi-professional American football for several years, founding the Berkshire Kings team.

== Political career ==
=== Libertarian Party ===
Shade first became interested in libertarian politics during the 2016 presidential election, when she voted for Gary Johnson. She joined the Libertarian Party soon afterwards, after chair of the national party Nicholas Sarwark put out a statement supporting transgender people.

She first ran for City Council in North Adams in 2017, but was defeated.

Shade was elected chair of the Libertarian Party of Massachusetts in 2021, becoming the first transgender person to chair a state party in Massachusetts. However, after harassment from the hard-right Mises Caucus faction of the Libertarian Party (which ultimately caused the Massachusetts Libertarian Party to split from the national party), she resigned from the party in 2022.

Shade joined the Democratic Party in 2023, saying "I decided to join the only political party that actually recognizes me as a human being."

=== North Adams City Council ===
Shade was first elected to the North Adams City Council in 2021, while serving on the city's Human Services Commission and the council's Inclusivity, Diversity, Equity, and Access Working Group. She focused her campaign on infrastructure projects in the city and acquiring state money to help fund them, as well as reviewing the city charter.

She was reelected in 2023 and was chosen as vice president of the city council. Although she filed to run for the Massachusetts House of Representatives' 1st Berkshire district against representative John Barrett, she ultimately chose not to run. Upon winning her third term in 2025, Shade was elected unanimously as president of the City Council.

While in office, she has focused on updating city ordinances and removing regulations she describes as overly complicated or burdensome, such as North Adams's old curfew laws, strict regulations on secondhand stores, and zoning and noise regulations that conflict with state law. Beginning in 2026, she is spearheading a "recodification" project to go through every line of the city charter and remove any outdated language or contradictions so as to make city law more accessible to the average citizen.

== Personal life ==
Shade came out as transgender in 2014.
