= List of current Massachusetts House of Representatives committees =

The Massachusetts House of Representatives currently has 11 committees.

== 2023–2025 Standing Committees ==
Committee	Chair	Vice Chair
Bills in the Third Reading	Thomas Walsh (D-12th Essex)	Brian Ashe (D-2nd Hampden)
Ethics	John Barrett (D-1st Berkshire)	Dave Robertson (D-19th Middlesex)
Federal Stimulus and Census Oversight	Jack Patrick Lewis (D-7th Middlesex)	Christopher Hendricks (D-11th Bristol)
Global Warming and Climate Change	Sean Garballey (D-23rd Middlesex)	Rady Mom (D-18th Middlesex)
Human Resources and Employee Engagement	Daniel J. Hunt (D-13th Suffolk)	Ted Philips (D-8th Norfolk)
Intergovernmental Affairs	Angelo Puppolo (D-12th Hampden)	Adam Scanlon (D-14th Bristol)
Operations, Facilities and Security	Joe McGonagle (D-28th Middlesex)	Russell Holmes (D-6th Suffolk)
Post Audit and Oversight	John J. Mahoney (D-13th Worcester)	Daniel R. Carey (D-2nd Hampshire)
Rules	William C. Galvin (D-6th Norfolk)	Smitty Pignatelli (D-3rd Berkshire)
Steering, Policy and Scheduling	Kevin Honan (D-17th Suffolk)	Tram Nguyen (D-18th Essex)
Ways and Means	Aaron Michlewitz (D-3rd Suffolk)	Ann-Margaret Ferrante (D-5th Essex)

== See also ==
- 2019–2020 Massachusetts legislature
- 2021–2022 Massachusetts legislature
- List of Massachusetts General Courts
