= John Waterhouse =

John Waterhouse may refer to:

- Rev. John Waterhouse, general superintendent of the Wesleyan Missions in Australia and Polynesia, father of George Waterhouse
- John Waterhouse (astronomer) (1806–1879), of Halifax, inventor in 1858 of photographic equipment known as "Waterhouse stops"
- John Waterhouse (headmaster) (1852–1940), Australian educator, grandson of Rev. John Waterhouse, son of Jabez Waterhouse
- John Waterhouse (violinist) (1877–1970), Canadian violinist, conductor, and music educator
- John William Waterhouse (1849–1917), British Pre-Raphaelite painter
- John H. Waterhouse (1870–1948), American businessman and mayor of North Adams, Massachusetts
- John Waterhouse, curator of Monash University Gallery, Melbourne, Australia, in the 1960s

== See also ==
- Jonathan Waterhouse (born 1965), English cricketer
- John Waterhouse Daniel (1845–1933), Canadian physician and Conservative politician
