= Daniel E. Bosley =

American politician

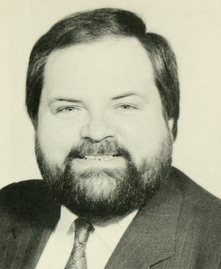

Member of the Massachusetts House of Representatives from the 1st Berkshire District
- In office January 7, 1987 – January 5, 2011
- Preceded by: Frank N. Costa
- Succeeded by: Gailanne Cariddi

Personal details
- Born: December 9, 1953 (age 72) North Adams, Massachusetts
- Party: Democratic
- Spouse: Laura Bosley
- Education: North Adams State College
- Occupation: Economic developer Politician; Baseball executive

Daniel E. Bosley (born December 9, 1953, in North Adams, Massachusetts ) is a former member of the Massachusetts House of Representatives and as president of the North Adams SteepleCats of the New England Collegiate Baseball League from 2011 to 2018. Bosley is the president of Dan Bosley Consulting Services, a government consulting agency.

== Education ==
Bosley was educated at Drury High School; graduated with his B.A. (cum laude) in 1976 from North Adams State College and earned his M.S. in Public Affairs in 1996 from the University of Massachusetts Boston.

== Political career ==
Bosley served on the North Adams City Council from 1983-1984. From 1987–2011 he represented the First Berkshire district in the Massachusetts House of Representatives. Bosley was a candidate for Sheriff of Berkshire County, but lost in the Democratic primary to Thomas Bowler.

On April 11, 2014, Bosley endorsed Don Berwick for Governor of Massachusetts.

=== Committee assignments ===
- House Committee on Bonding, Capital Expenditures and State Assets (Vice-Chairman), February 2009 – present
- Joint Committee on Economic Development and Emerging Technologies (House Chairman), January 2005 – February 2009.
- Joint Committee on Government Regulations (House Chairman), May 1996 – January 2005
- Joint Committee on Labor and Workforce Development (House Chairman), January 1992 – May 1996
- Joint Committee on Public Service (House Vice-Chairman), 1990–1991
