= Christopher Speranzo =

American politician

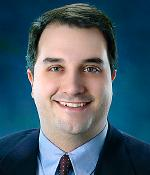

Clerk Magistrate of the Pittsfield District Court
- Incumbent
- Assumed office July 13, 2011
- Appointed by: Deval Patrick
- Preceded by: Leo F. Ryan

Member of the Massachusetts House of Representatives from the 3rd Berkshire district
- In office April 25, 2005 – July 13, 2011
- Preceded by: Peter J. Larkin
- Succeeded by: Tricia Farley-Bouvier

Solicitor of Pittsfield
- In office January 2004 – January 2005
- Appointed by: James M. Ruberto
- Preceded by: Jeffrey A. Honig
- Succeeded by: Kathleen E. Degnan (2012)

Personal details
- Born: Christopher Nicholas Speranzo; October 24, 1972 (age 53) Pittsfield, Massachusetts, U.S.
- Party: Democratic
- Spouse: Jenelle Dodds
- Education: Boston College (BA, JD); University of Cambridge (MPhil)

Christopher Nicholas Speranzo (born October 24, 1972) is an American lawyer and politician from Massachusetts.

== Early life, education, & early career ==
He was born on October 24, 1972, in Pittsfield, Massachusetts, and graduated from St. Joseph Central High School. He graduated from Boston College with a Bachelor of Arts degree in political science and later a Master of Philosophy degree in history from the University of Cambridge. He later earned his J.D. degree from Boston College Law School in 2001.

After graduating from the University of Cambridge he worked for the municipal government of Pittsfield negotiating city and state projects with General Electric.

== Legal career ==
After graduating from law school he served as an Assistant Attorney General in the office of the Attorney General of Massachusetts rising through the General Counsel's Office to directing the Western Division's Public Protection Unit. While serving under Tom Reilly he served on the Springfield Violence Prevention Task Force and the Attorney General's Safe Neighborhood Initiative. In 2004 he was nominated to serve as the Solicitor of Pittsfield by Mayor James M. Ruberto. He would be replacing Jeffrey Honig who resigned in May 2003. He was later confirmed by the Pittsfield City Council and served in that position from January 2004 until January 2005 when he resigned to campaign for state representative.

After he resigned in January 2005 the city solicitor position remained vacant until 2006 when Mayor Ruberto decided to privatize the city's legal services because he was unable to find someone to replace him. From 2006 until 2012 the city's legal service was operated by an attorney who worked for Freedman, DeRosa & Rondeau (now DeRosa Dohoney LLP). In 2012 Mayor Daniel L. Bianchi nominated Kathleen E. Degnan to succeed Speranzo as solicitor. She was later confirmed by the city council and sworn in as the new solicitor of the city.

== Political career ==
From January 2005 until April 2005 he campaigned and won a special election to fill the 3rd Berkshire district seat in the state house which was vacated by Peter J. Larkin. He defeated Republican challenger Terry M. Kinnas and was sworn in on April 25, 2005. He represented the 3rd Berkshire district in the Massachusetts House of Representatives until July 13, 2011, when he resigned to accept a position that he was appointed to by Governor Deval Patrick.

== Post-political career ==
On June 7, 2011, he was nominated by Governor Deval Patrick to serve as Clerk Magistrate of the Pittsfield District Court, replacing Leo F. Ryan who retired in 2009. On July 6, 2011, he was confirmed by the Massachusetts Governor's Council in a 5–4 vote with Lieutenant Governor Tim Murray casting the tie breaking vote. He was sworn in on July 13, 2011.

== Personal life ==
He and his wife Jenelle Dodds live in Pittsfield.
