= Massachusetts House of Representatives' 3rd Berkshire district =

American legislative district

Massachusetts House of Representatives district map.

Massachusetts House of Representatives' 3rd Berkshire district in the United States is one of 160 legislative districts included in the lower house of the Massachusetts General Court. It covers the towns of Alford, Becket, Dalton, Egremont, Great Barrington, Lee, Lenox, Monterey, Mount Washington, New Marlborough, Otis, Richmond, Sandisfield, Sheffield, Stockbridge, Tyringham, Washington, and West Stockbridge. Democrat Leigh Davis has represented the district since 2025.

The current district geographic boundary overlaps with that of the Massachusetts Senate's Berkshire, Hampshire, Franklin and Hampden district.

== Representatives ==
- Edward Larned, circa 1858
- Julius Rockwell, circa 1858
- Henry Colt, circa 1859
- John A. Walker, circa 1859
- Samuel M. Raymond, circa 1888
- Elmer L. McCulloch, circa 1920
- Thomas Edward Enright, circa 1951
- William Kitterman, circa 1975
- Robert Jakubowicz, circa 1990
- Peter J. Larkin, 1991–2005
- Christopher Speranzo, 2005–2011
- Tricia Farley-Bouvier, 2011-2023
- William "Smitty" Pignatelli, 2023-2025
- Leigh Davis, 2025-Present

== Former locales ==
The district previously covered:

- Dalton, circa 1872
- Richmond, circa 1872

== See also ==
- Other Berkshire County districts of the Massachusetts House of Representatives: 1st, 2nd, 4th
- List of Massachusetts House of Representatives elections
- List of Massachusetts General Courts
- List of former districts of the Massachusetts House of Representatives

== Images ==
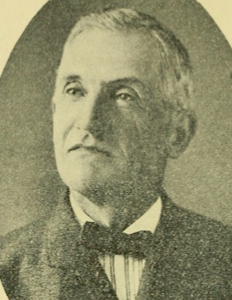
David Cole

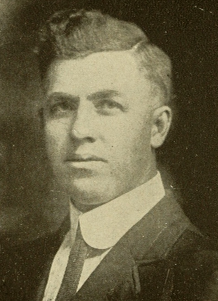
Cornelius Boothman

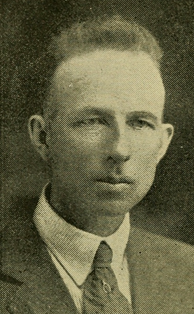
Elmer McCulloch

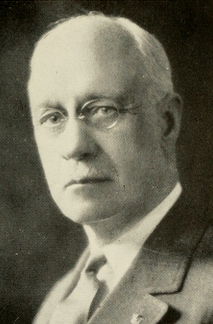
Harry Sisson

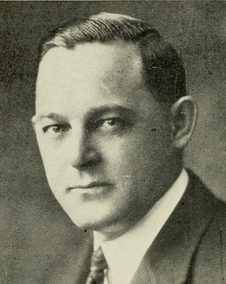
Ralph Otis

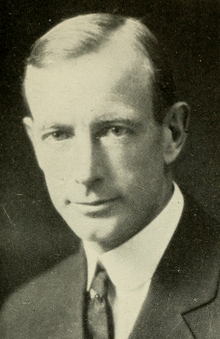
William Akeroyd

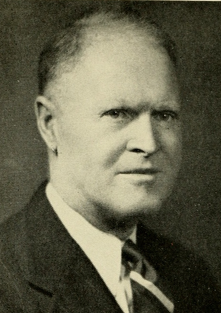
Daniel Casey

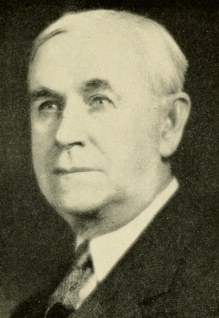
Matthew Capeless

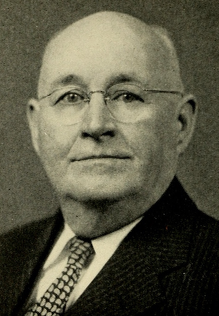
Thomas Edward Enright

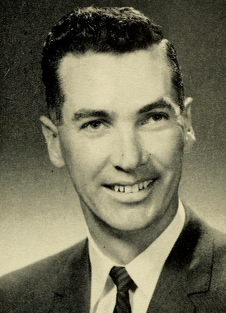
William Kitterman

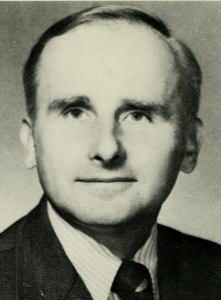
Robert Jakubowicz

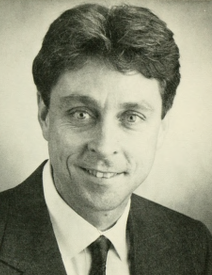
Peter Larkin
