= Massachusetts House of Representatives' 2nd Berkshire district =

American legislative district

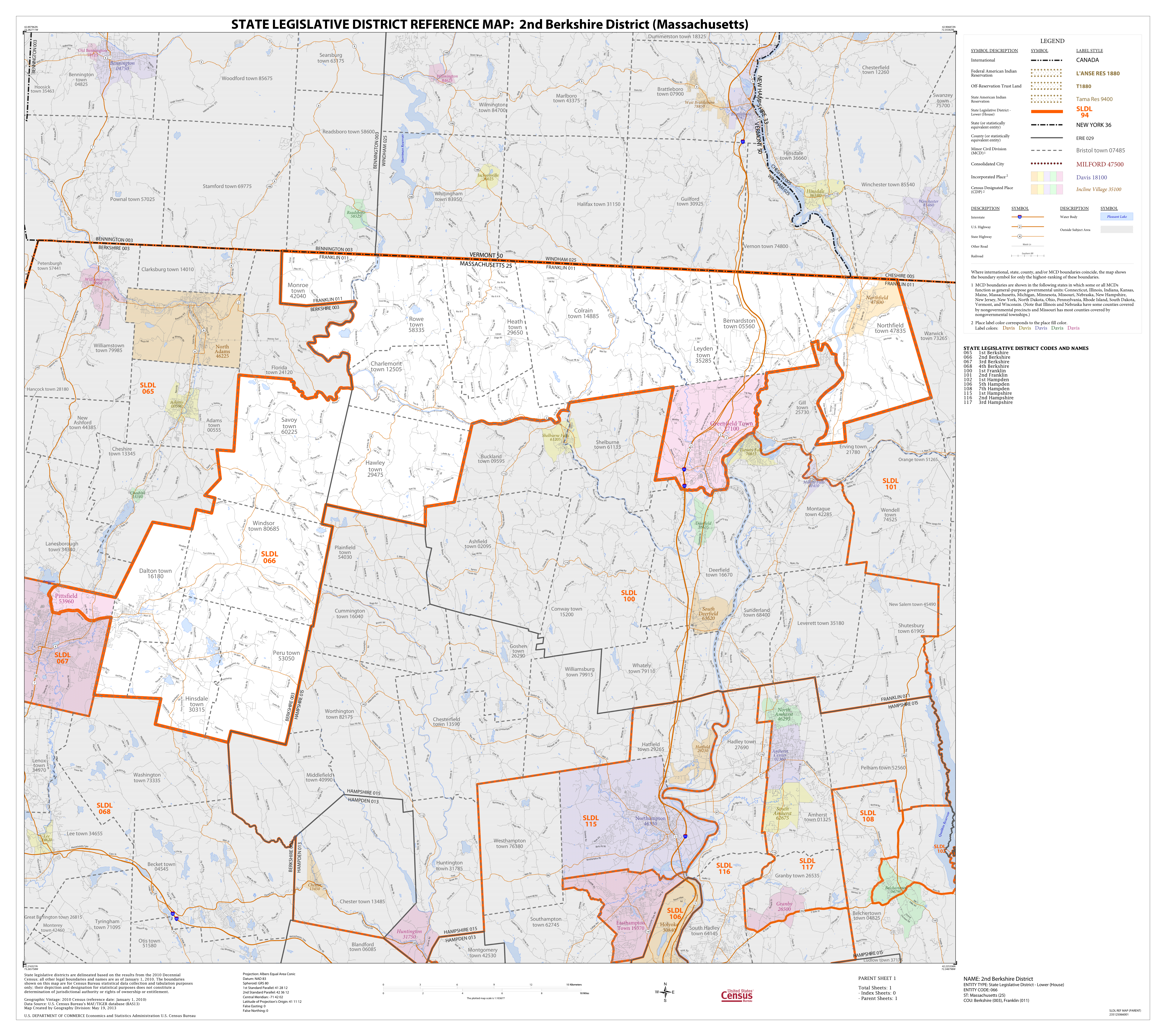
Map of Massachusetts House of Representatives' 2nd Berkshire district, based on the 2010 United States census.

Massachusetts House of Representatives' 2nd Berkshire district in the United States is one of 160 legislative districts included in the lower house of the Massachusetts General Court. It covers parts of Berkshire County and Franklin County. Democrat Tricia Farley-Bouvier currently represents the district in the Massachusetts House of Representatives.

== Towns represented ==
The district includes the following localities:

- Bernardston
- Charlemont
- Colrain
- Dalton
- Greenfield
- Hawley
- Heath
- Hinsdale
- Leyden
- Monroe
- Northfield
- Peru
- Pittsfield
- Rowe
- Savoy
- Windsor

The current district geographic boundary overlaps with those of the Massachusetts Senate's Berkshire, Hampshire, Franklin and Hampden and Hampshire, Franklin and Worcester districts.

=== Former locales ===
The district previously covered:

- Adams, circa 1872
- Cheshire, circa 1872
- Clarksburg, circa 1872
- Florida, circa 1872

== Representatives ==
- Russell C. Brown, circa 1858
- Sylvander Johnson, circa 1858
- William H. Tyler, 2d, circa 1859
- John Milton Morin, circa 1888
- William H. Woodhead, circa 1920
- Richard August Ruether, circa 1951
- Anthony P. McBride, circa 1975
- Sherwood Guernsey, 1983–1990
- Shaun P. Kelly, 1991–2005
- Denis Guyer, 2005–2011
- Paul W. Mark, 2011-2025
- Tricia Farley-Bouvier, 2025-Present

== See also ==
- Other Berkshire County districts of the Massachusetts House of Representatives: 1st, 3rd, 4th
- List of Massachusetts House of Representatives elections
- List of Massachusetts General Courts
- List of former districts of the Massachusetts House of Representatives

== Images ==
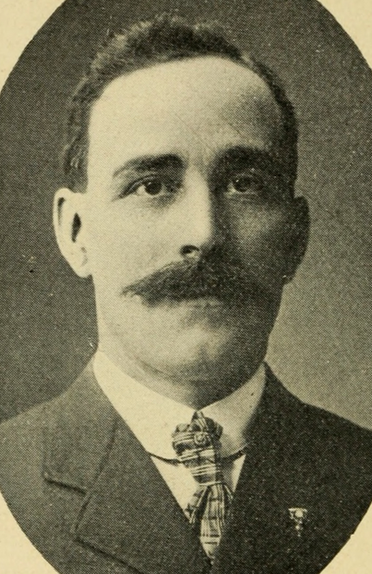
Homer Hall

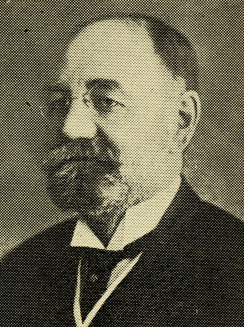
George Waterman

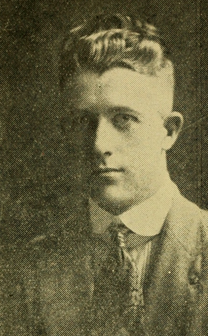
James Welch

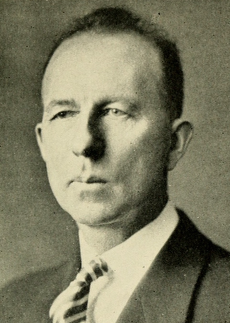
Elmer McCulloch

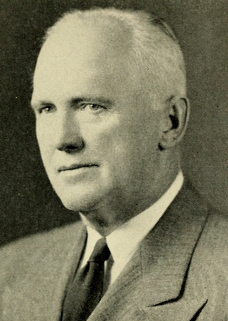
Richard August Ruether

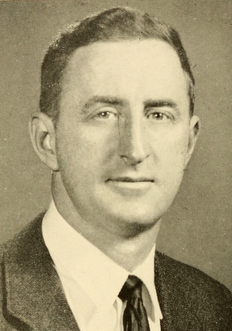
Edward Zelazo

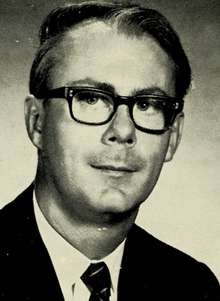
Anthony McBride

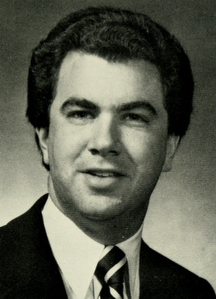
Thomas Lussier

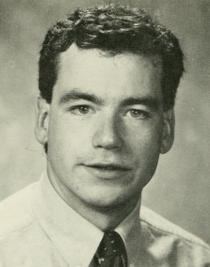
Shaun Kelly
