= Peter J. Larkin =

American politician

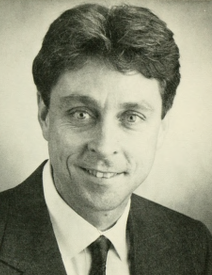
- Portrait of Peter J. Larkin

Member of the Massachusetts House of Representatives from the 3rd Berkshire District
- In office 1991–2005
- Preceded by: Robert Jakubowicz
- Succeeded by: Christopher Speranzo

Personal details
- Born: December 23, 1953 (age 72) Pittsfield, Massachusetts
- Party: Democratic
- Education: St. Bonaventure University
- Occupation: Wholesale Beverage Distributor

Peter J. Larkin (born December 23, 1953, in Pittsfield, Massachusetts) is an American politician who represented the 3rd Berkshire District in the Massachusetts House of Representatives from 1991 to 2005.
