= WBRL =

- WBRL-CD, a Class A LPTV station (virtual channel 21 (UHF digital channel 20)), licensed to Baton Rouge, Louisiana
- WBRL (AM), a radio station (1400 AM), which was located in Berlin, New Hampshire from 1962 to 1993
- WFMF, a radio station (102.5 FM), licensed to Baton Rouge, Louisiana, which held the call sign WBRL from 1943 to 1959
