= Massachusetts House of Representatives' 4th Berkshire district =

American legislative district

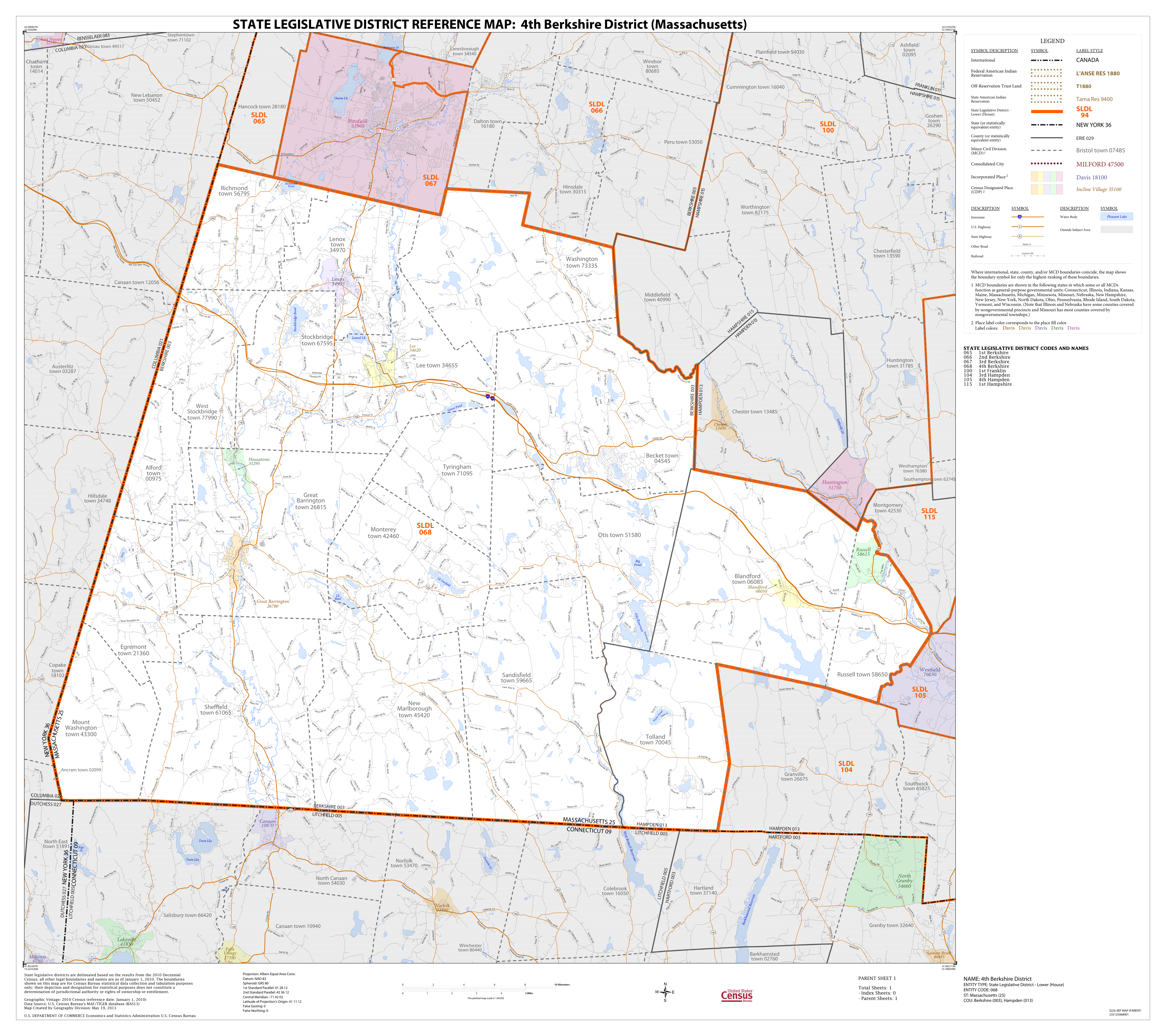
Map of Massachusetts House of Representatives' 4th Berkshire district, based on the 2010 United States census.

Massachusetts House of Representatives' 4th Berkshire district in the United States was one of 160 legislative districts included in the lower house of the Massachusetts General Court. It covered parts of Berkshire County and Hampden County. Democrat Smitty Pignatelli of Lenox last represented the district.

In 2022, the district was replaced by Massachusetts House of Representatives' 19th Worcester district.

== Towns represented ==
The district includes the following localities:

- Alford
- Becket
- Blandford
- Egremont
- Great Barrington
- Lee
- Lenox
- Monterey
- Mount Washington
- New Marlborough
- Otis
- Richmond
- Russell
- Sandisfield
- Sheffield
- Stockbridge
- Tolland
- Tyringham
- Washington
- West Stockbridge

The current district geographic boundary overlaps with those of the Massachusetts Senate's 2nd Hampden and Hampshire and Berkshire, Hampshire, Franklin and Hampden districts.

=== Former locales ===
The district previously covered:

- Hinsdale, circa 1872
- Peru, circa 1872
- Windsor, circa 1872

== Representatives ==
- John Smith, circa 1858
- Henry D. Lyman, circa 1859
- William Henry Carey, circa 1888
- Henry M. Peirson, circa 1888
- Charles R. Foote, circa 1920
- John C. Marshall, circa 1920
- John Glenn Orr, circa 1920
- Arthur William Milne, circa 1951
- Dennis J. Duffin, circa 1975
- Christopher Hodgkins, 1983–2003
- William "Smitty" Pignatelli, 2003–2023

== See also ==
- Other Berkshire County districts of the Massachusetts House of Representatives: 1st, 2nd, 3rd
- List of Massachusetts House of Representatives elections
- List of Massachusetts General Courts
- List of former districts of the Massachusetts House of Representatives

== Images ==
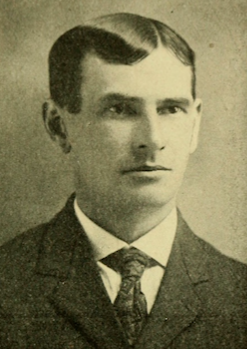
Frederick McClatchey

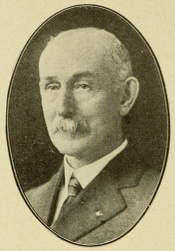
Frank Bartlett

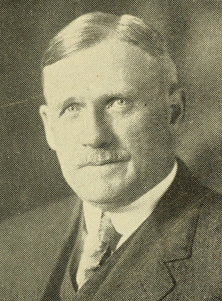
John Orr

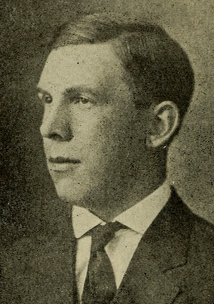
Robert Kent

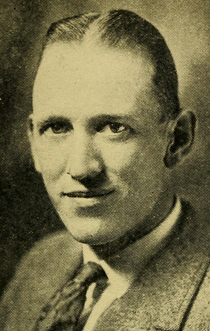
Harold Goewey

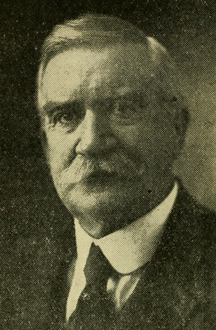
Jeremiah Linnehan

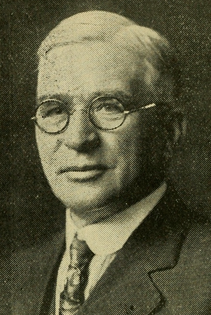
William Staples

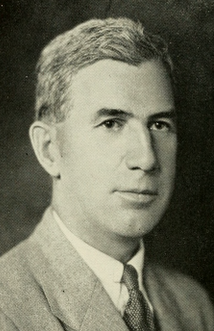
Clarence Durant

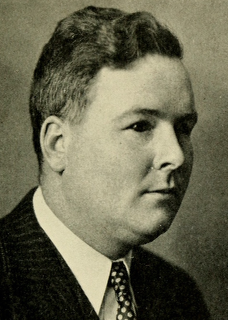
James Hannon

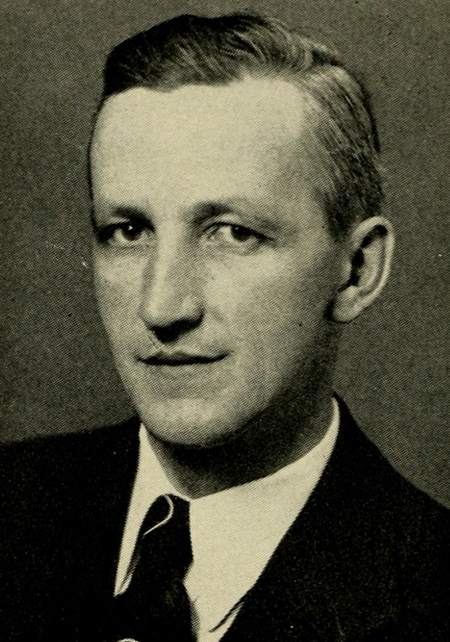
Arthur William Milne

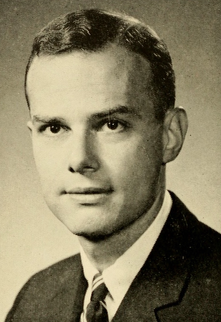
Joel Greenberg

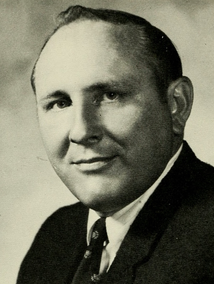
Dennis Duffin

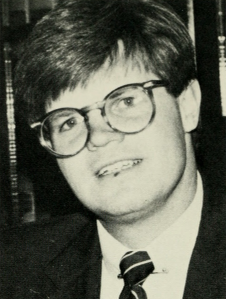
Christopher Hodgkins
