= Francis C. Florini =

American politician

Francis Constant Florini

26th Mayor of North Adams, Massachusetts
- In office 1962–1967
- Preceded by: Louis J. Diamond
- Succeeded by: Richard C. Lamb

Alderman Ward 6 of the City of Beverly, Massachusetts

Member of the Water Board of East Boothbay, Maine
- In office 1985–1995

Personal details
- Born: September 7, 1919 North Adams, Massachusetts
- Died: October 17, 2008 (aged 89) Manchester-by-the-Sea, Massachusetts
- Spouse(s): Gertrude R. Fuller; Prunella J. Hall Pollard
- Education: University of Massachusetts Amherst, May 1949
- Awards: Purple Heart, Good Conduct

Military service
- Branch/service: United States Army
- Battles/wars: World War II

Francis Constant Florini (September 7, 1919 – October 17, 2008) was an American politician who served as the twenty-sixth Mayor of North Adams, Massachusetts.

Francis Constant Florini was born September 1919 in North Adams, Massachusetts to Mary A. (nee Rosasco) and John B. Florini.

Florini attended Drury High School and joined the US Army in 1942 serving as a radio corpsman. He was wounded in Sicily in 1943, and received the Purple Heart and Good Conduct medals.

He attended the University of Massachusetts Amherst. While attending university, he was a member of Sigma Apha Epsilon, Sons of Italy, and American Legion.

In September 1949, Florini married Gertrude A Fuller.

In 1962, Florini was elected Mayor of North Adams, and retained that post for three terms.

Florini died at the age of 89 on October 17, 2008.

== See also ==
- List of mayors of North Adams, Massachusetts

Political offices
Preceded by Louis J. Diamond	26th Mayor of North Adams, Massachusetts; 1962–1967	Succeeded by James F. Cleary
