= Leigh Davis =

Leigh Davis may refer to:

- Leigh Davis (poet)
- Leigh Davis (politician)
