= Tricia Farley-Bouvier =

American politician

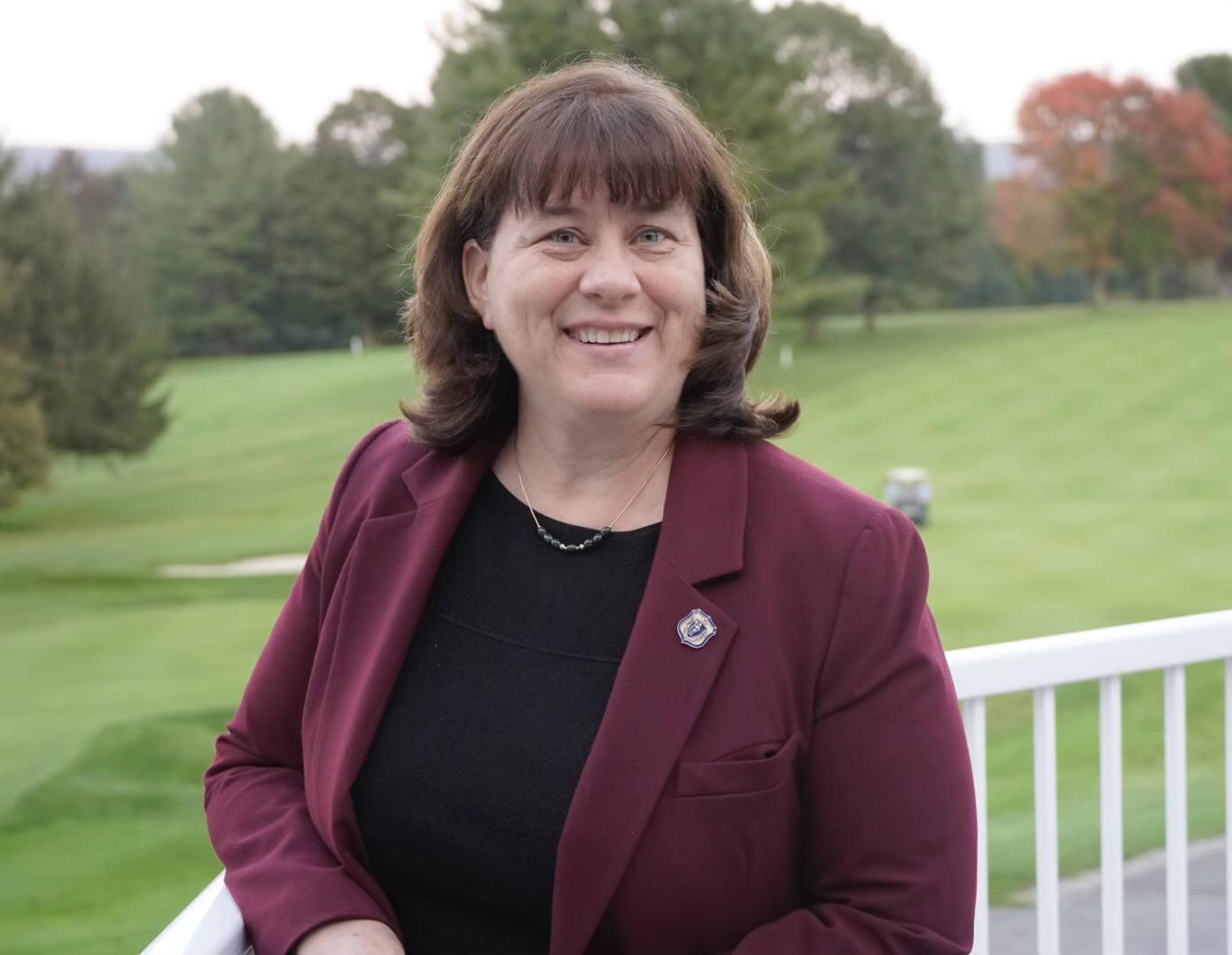

Member of the Massachusetts House of Representatives
- Incumbent
- Assumed office 2011
- Preceded by: Christopher Speranzo
- Constituency: 3rd Berkshire (2011-2023); 2nd Berkshire (2023-present)

Personal details
- Born: Pittsfield, Massachusetts, U.S.
- Party: Democratic
- Education: Salve Regina University; University of Connecticut
- Website: http://triciafarleybouvier.com

Tricia Farley-Bouvier is an American state legislator serving in the Massachusetts House of Representatives, representing the 2nd Berkshire district, serving all of the city of Pittsfield. She serves as House Chair of the Joint Committee on Advanced information technology, the Internet and Cybersecurity (AITIC) in the 193rd legislative session.

== Early life and education ==
Farley-Bouvier is from Pittsfield, and attended Pittsfield High School before receiving a bachelor's degree in special and elementary education from Salve Regina University and a master's degree in education from the University of Connecticut.

== Career ==
Farley-Bouvier served as a Pittsfield City Councilor from 2004 to 2008, was elected for the first time to the Massachusetts House of Representatives via special election in 2011 and has served since then.

== House of Representatives ==
=== Tenure ===
Since her election in 2011, Representative Farley-Bouvier has worked on a number of legislative priorities covering early education, child welfare, K-12 school funding, West-East Rail, and more. Farley-Bouvier is a member of 3 legislative caucus - the House Progressive Caucus, the Gateway Cities Caucus, and the Massachusetts Caucus of Women Legislators.

==== Legislation ====
Farley-Bouvier was the lead sponsor of the following pieces of legislation that were signed into law:

- H.841, An Act relative to prescription eye drops, signed into law on Jan. 13, 2017
- H.3456, An Act relative to work and family mobility, signed into law via veto override on June 9, 2022
- H.212, An Act establishing a foster parents' Bill of Rights, signed into law on Jan. 4, 2023

=== Committee Assignments ===
In the 193rd legislative session, Farley-Bouvier was appointed by Speaker Mariano as the House Chair of the Joint Committee on Advanced Information Technology, the Internet and Cybersecurity (AITIC). The AITIC committee covers matters of data privacy, artificial intelligence, cybersecurity, technology modernization and digitization in government, digital equity, and more.

=== Elections ===
==== 2011 Special Election ====
Farley-Bouvier was first elected to the House of Representatives in a special election taking place on October 18, 2011 that was held when former Representative Speranzo departed from the seat due to appointment as the Clerk Magistrate by then Governor Patrick. Farley-Bouvier earned the endorsement from the Berkshire Eagle during the election cycle. Farley-Bouvier defeated Republican Mark Jester, Green Rainbow Party Member Mark Miller, and Enrolled Pam Malumphy.

==== 2016 Election ====
Farley-Bouvier faced primary challenger Mike Bloomberg, a fellow Pittsfield Democrat who shares the name of his cousin, former New York City Mayor Michael Bloomberg. Farley-Bouvier defeated Bloomberg in the primary election.

In the general election, Farley-Bouvier faced unenrolled candidate Christopher Connell, and defeated Connell in the election.

== See also ==
- 2019–2020 Massachusetts legislature
- 2021–2022 Massachusetts legislature
