= Andrew Fitch (politician) =

American politician

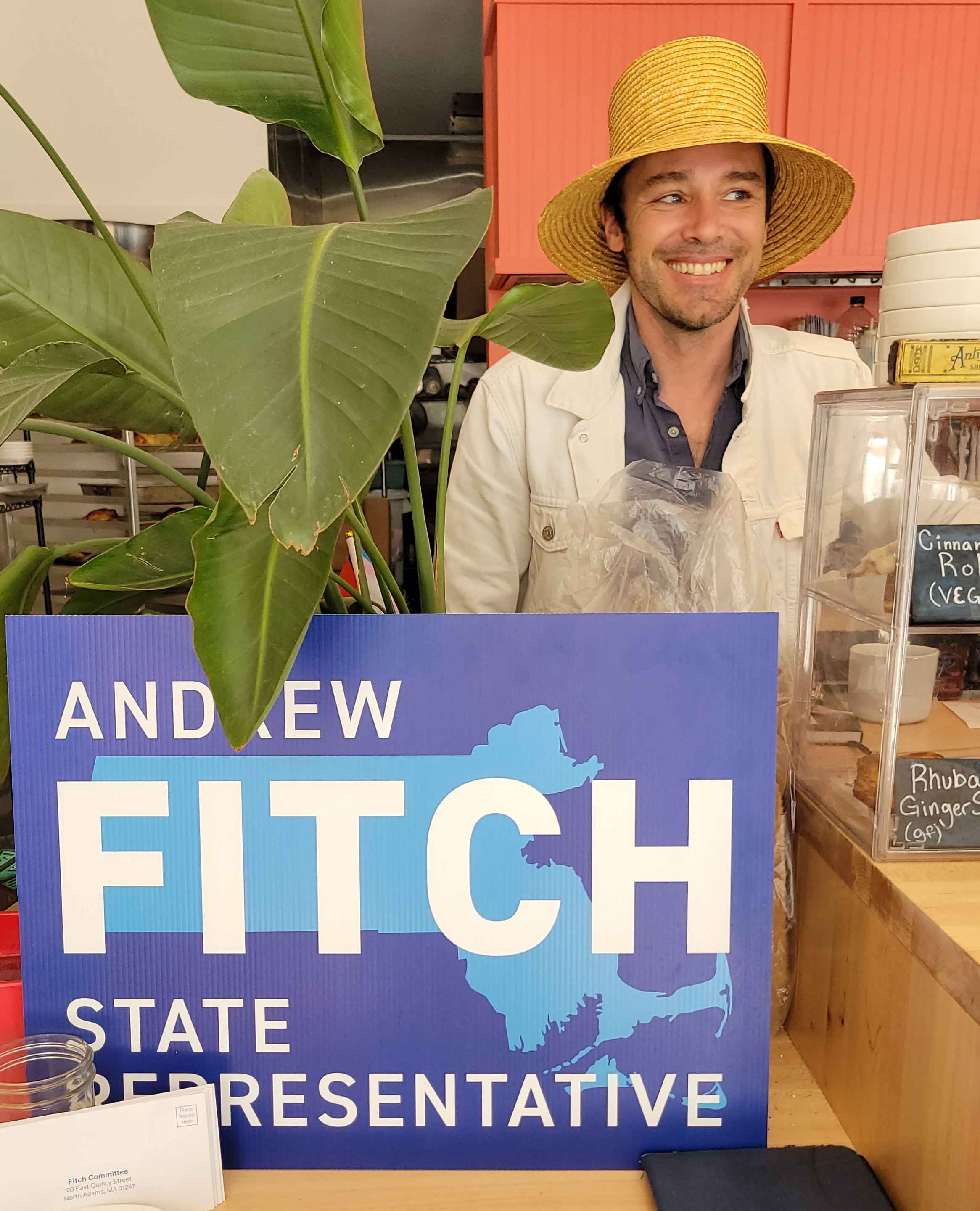
- Fitch in front of campaign signs in 2026

Vice President of the North Adams City Council
- Incumbent
- Assumed office January 1, 2026

Member of the North Adams City Council
- Incumbent
- Assumed office January 1, 2024

Personal details
- Born: August 20, 1984 (age 42) Marshfield, Massachusetts
- Party: Democratic
- Education: James Madison University

Andrew Fitch is an American politician and business owner serving as Vice President of the North Adams City Council in Massachusetts. He was a candidate in the Democratic primary for the Massachusetts House of Representatives' 1st Berkshire district in 2026.

== Early life and education ==
Fitch was born in Marshfield, Massachusetts. He studied international affairs and political science at James Madison University.

== Political career ==
Before running for city council, Fitch served on the North Adams Zoning Board of Appeals and its Inclusion, Diversity, Equity, and Access commission.

=== North Adams City Council ===
Fitch was first elected to the North Adams City Council in 2023, where he received the most votes of any candidate running. (Note: North Adams uses plurality block voting for its City Council elections.) During his first term, he focused on affordable housing development in North Adams (such as a dedicated housing trust), increasing tourism and traffic through the downtown of the city, and advocating for the Northern Tier Passenger Rail to connect North Adams to Boston by train. Fitch also led a resolution in the city council to declare North Adams a sanctuary city for the LGBTQ+ community.

Fitch was reelected in 2025, again receiving the most votes of any candidate, and was selected to serve as vice-president of the city council and chair of the Community Development Committee.

=== Massachusetts state representative campaign ===
In February 2026, Fitch announced he would run for the 1st Berkshire District in the Massachusetts House of Representatives, which encompasses the northern third of Berkshire County. He challenged Representative John Barrett in the Democratic primary, but lost 49%-51%.

Fitch described his campaign as focusing on economic opportunity, affordability, and cross-regional collaboration in the Berkshires. He also sought increased state funding for transit institutions like the Berkshire Regional Transit Authority and outdoor spaces like the Mount Greylock State Reservation.

== Personal life ==
Fitch is the cofounder (along with Meghan Daly) of a cafe and bar in downtown North Adams, Steeple City Social. The business opened in 2025 after a successful Kickstarter campaign, and is part of the movement to revitalize North Adams after economic downturn in the late 80s and 90s.

Fitch is one of the leaders of the North Adams Pride celebrations. He is openly gay.
