= Andrew Fitch =

Andrew Fitch may refer to:

- Andy Fitch, American former wrestler
- Andrew Fitch (politician), an American politician from Massachusetts
