= Gailanne Cariddi =

American politician

Member of the Massachusetts House of Representatives from the 1st Berkshire district
- In office January 5, 2011 – June 17, 2017
- Preceded by: Daniel E. Bosley
- Succeeded by: John Barrett

Personal details
- Born: November 1, 1953 North Adams, Massachusetts
- Died: June 17, 2017 (aged 63) Boston, Massachusetts
- Party: Democratic
- Education: Bentley University

Gailanne M. Cariddi (November 1, 1953 – June 17, 2017) was an American politician and a member of the Massachusetts House of Representatives for the First Berkshire District. The district consists of nine communities including the cities of Adams, Cheshire, Clarksburg, Florida, Hancock, Lanesborough, New Ashford, North Adams and Williamstown.

Cariddi was born in North Adams, in 1953. During her tenure in the Massachusetts House of Representatives, she served as the vice-chair of the Joint Committee on Municipalities and Regional Government, and as a member of the Joint Committee on Environment, Natural Resources and Agriculture and the Joint Committee on Transportation.

She served on the North Adams City Council.

Cariddi died in office on June 17, 2017, at Massachusetts General Hospital in Boston due to cancer. She continued her work while dealing with the illness.
