= Albert C. Houghton =

American politician

Albert Charles Houghton
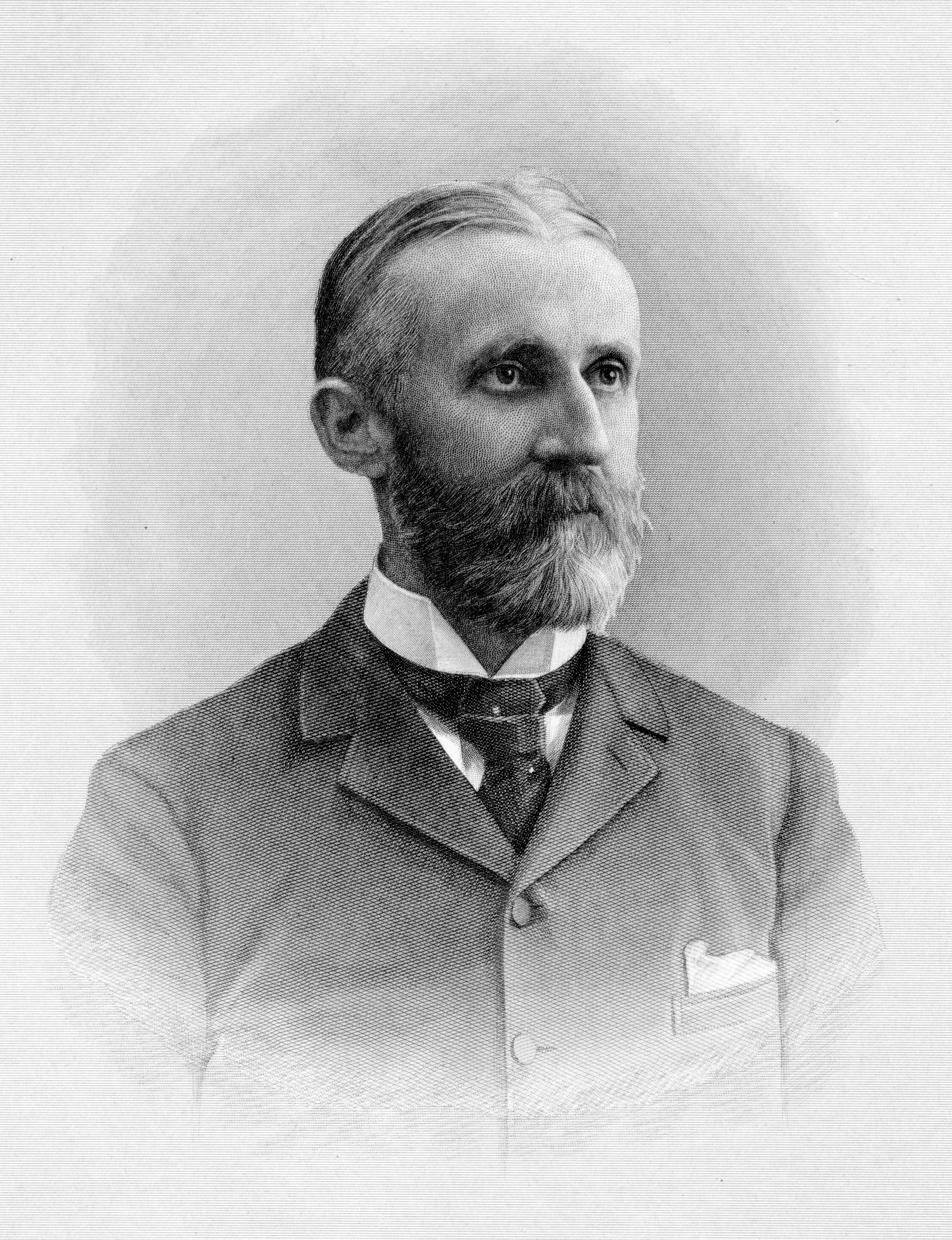

1st Mayor of North Adams, Massachusetts
- In office 1896–1897
- Preceded by: Board of Selectmen
- Succeeded by: H. Terry Cady

Personal details
- Born: April 13, 1844 Stamford, Vermont
- Died: August 11, 1914 (aged 70) North Adams, Massachusetts
- Spouse: Cordelia Houghton (1845 - 1918)
- Children: Mary Houghton; Florence Houghton; Laura Houghton; Susan Houghton; Alice Houghton
- Profession: Businessman
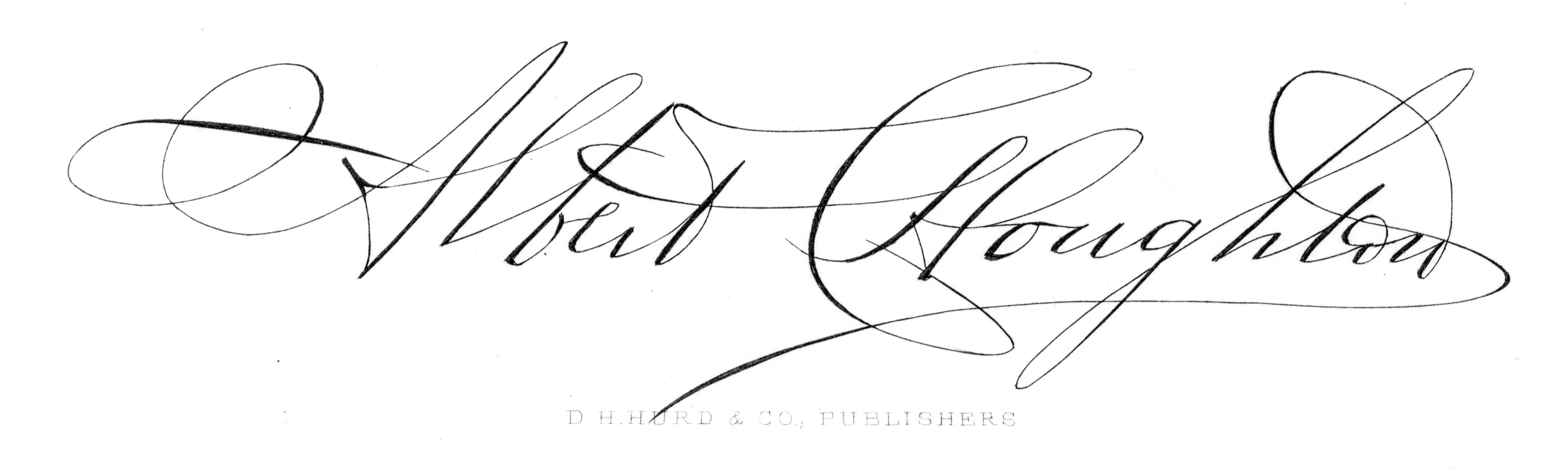
- Signature

Albert Charles Houghton (April 13, 1844 – August 11, 1914) was an American businessman and politician who served as the first mayor of North Adams, Massachusetts.

== Biography ==
Albert Charles Houghton was born April 13, 1844, in Stamford, Vermont, to James and Chloe Houghton. He was the youngest son in a family of nine children.

Houghton married Cordelia J. Smith of Stamford in 1866. They had four children, all of whom studied in Germany.

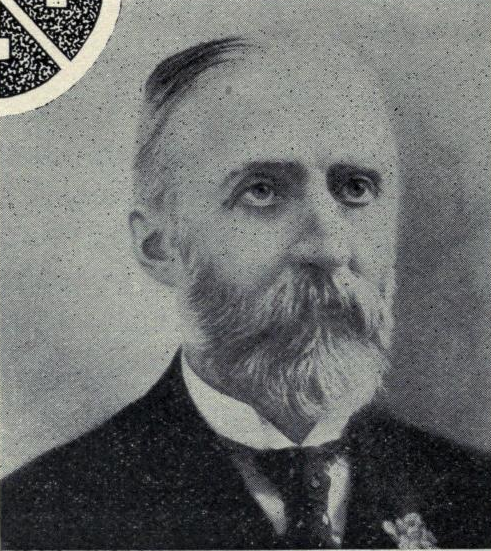

Houghton died as a result of injuries 11 days after a car accident that also killed his daughter Mary and her friend Sybil Cady Hutton. The chauffeur, John Widders, killed himself the next morning.

== Businesses ==
Houghton was engaged in various business dealings. Before he was 21, he founded the Houghton Chemical Works of Stamford with his brother J.R. Houghton. By 1868, he was doing work in real estate and operating the Parker Mill in North Adams, Massachusetts. Houghton and his family moved to North Adams permanently in 1870.

Houghton owned the North Pownal Manufacturing Company in North Pownal, Vermont. He became president of the Arnold Print Works in 1881. He was president and owner of the A.J. Houghton Brewing Company of Boston, upon the death of founder A.J. Houghton in 1892. In 1877, he bought the Williamstown Manufacturing Company. In 1878 he bought the Eclipse Mill and Beaver Mill, both cotton manufacturing mills. In 1895 he became director of the Boston & Albany Railroad. He was also a trustee of Williams College and sat on the boards of various banks. Five days prior to his death in 1914, Houghton purchased the Mausert Block in Adams, Massachusetts.

== Politics ==
In 1868, Houghton was a member of the state legislature in Vermont, representing his hometown of Searsburg. When North Adams was incorporated as a city in 1895, Houghton was nominated by "all parties" and elected its first mayor.

== Notes ==
Political offices
Preceded by Board of Selectmen	1st Mayor of North Adams, Massachusetts; 1896–1897	Succeeded by H. Terry Cady
