= Massachusetts College of Liberal Arts =

Public college in North Adams, Massachusetts, U.S.

- Former names: North Adams State College (1960–1997); State Teachers College of North Adams (1932–1960); North Adams Normal School (1894–1932)
- Type: Public liberal arts college
- Established: 1894; 132 years ago
- Accreditation: NECHE
- Academic affiliations: Council of Public Liberal Arts Colleges
- Endowment: $14.7 million (2020)
- President: Diana L. Rogers-Adkinson
- Faculty: 78 full-time 46 part-time
- Students: 896 (Fall 2024)
- Undergraduates: 794 (Fall 2024)
- Postgraduates: 102 (Fall 2024)
- Location: North Adams, Massachusetts, U.S. 42.6917°N 73.1039°W
- Campus: Rural, 105 acres (42 ha)
- Colors: Navy and gold
- Nickname: Trailblazers
- Sporting affiliations: NCAA Division III, Massachusetts State Collegiate Athletic Conference, North Atlantic Conference
- Mascot: Murdock the Mountain Lion
- Website: mcla.edu
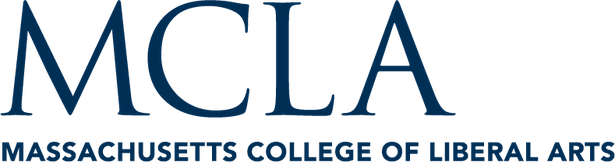

The Massachusetts College of Liberal Arts (MCLA), formerly known as North Adams State College (NASC), is a public liberal arts college in North Adams, Massachusetts. It is part of the state university system of Massachusetts. It is a member of the Council of Public Liberal Arts Colleges. Originally established as part of the state's normal school system for training teachers, it now offers programs leading to Bachelor of Science and Bachelor of Arts degrees, as well as graduate degrees and advanced certificates.

== History ==
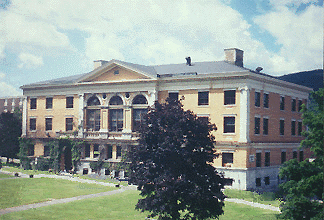
Murdock Hall, one of the college' s classroom buildings.

MCLA was founded in 1894 as "North Adams Normal School", and it offered first instruction at post-secondary level three years later. By 1897, the Normal School enrolled 32 students (29 women, 3 men) and employed 4 teachers. In 1932, North Adams Normal School became "State Teachers College of North Adams", added an upper-division curriculum, and started awarding bachelor's degrees. In 1936, it instituted graduate program. In 1960, it changed its name to "North Adams State College" and, in 1997, to "Massachusetts College of Liberal Arts", reflecting its position as the public liberal arts college within the Massachusetts state university system.

In 2004, President Mary Grant led in the creation of the Berkshire Compact for Higher Education and MCLA Gallery 51. MCLA also is the lead partner in the Berkshire STEM (Science, Technology, Engineering and Math) Pipeline Network.

In 2008, the Massachusetts Higher Education Bond Bill included $54.5 million for a new Center for Science and Innovation at MCLA. It opened in 2013 as the Feigenbaum Center for Science and Innovation.

In 2014, Grant left the college and Cynthia F. Brown was appointed Interim President. Although Greg Summers was initially named the new president, he later withdrew his acceptance, citing family health concerns. On December 9, 2015, Jaimie Birge was named as president.

On September 2, 2025, James Birge announced his plans to retire at the conclusion of his 10th year in office. Diana L. Rogers-Adkinson was named the 13th president of the Massachusetts College of Liberal Arts on April 24, 2026. Rogers-Adkinson, who formerly served on MCLA’s accreditation committee, was a chief academic officer for the Pennsylvania State System of Higher Education before her presidency at MCLA.

== Academics ==
Academic rankings

Liberal arts
- U.S. News & World Report: 115

Undergraduate demographics as of Fall 2023
| Race and ethnicity | Total |
|---|---|
| White | 72% |
| Hispanic | 10% |
| Black | 9% |
| Two or more races | 4% |
| Unknown | 3% |
| Asian | 2% |
| International student | 1% |
Economic diversity
| Low-income (Note: The percentage of students who received an income-based federal Pell grant intended for low-income students.) | 45% |
| Affluent (Note: The percentage of students who are a part of the American middle class at the bare minimum.) | 55% |

MCLA has a rolling admissions plan. It requires graduation from an accredited secondary school or a GED. MCLA is test-free. MCLA accepts transfer students with grade-point average requirements or with an associate degree. MCLA is accredited by the New England Commission of Higher Education.

MCLA awards the Bachelor of Arts and a Bachelor of Science on the undergraduate level and also confers master's degrees in both education and business administration, as well as a Certificate of Advanced Graduate Study (CAGS). MCLA offers 90+ majors, minors, concentrations, graduate programs, certificates, and pathways. On average, MCLA offers 300 academic courses each semester. Graduation from MCLA requires completing 120 credits of academic work. Of these, about 40 must in the college-wide core curriculum. Another 40 credits are required for a major. At least 40 upper-division credits are required. At least 45 credits must be earned while the student is in residence at the college. Students must earn at least a 2.0 grade point average overall and a 2.0 in their major.

=== Distinctive educational programs ===
MCLA offers internships for undergraduates through the Berkshire Hills Internship Program. It also offers undergraduates coursework in other countries through its travel abroad program. MCLA belongs to the Massachusetts Council for International Education (MaCIE), College Consortium for International Studies (CCIS), and the National Student Exchange (NSE). Through these associations and connections, students are sent on semester- or year-long programs to different colleges.

The college Honors Program includes ten percent of the student body for whom it offers special interdisciplinary courses in such topics as "The Mathematics of Fairness," "Ethics and Animals" or "The Romantic Movement." The college is authorized by the state to grant the distinction "Commonwealth Scholar" to students who complete the honors program with a capstone thesis.

== Organization and administration ==
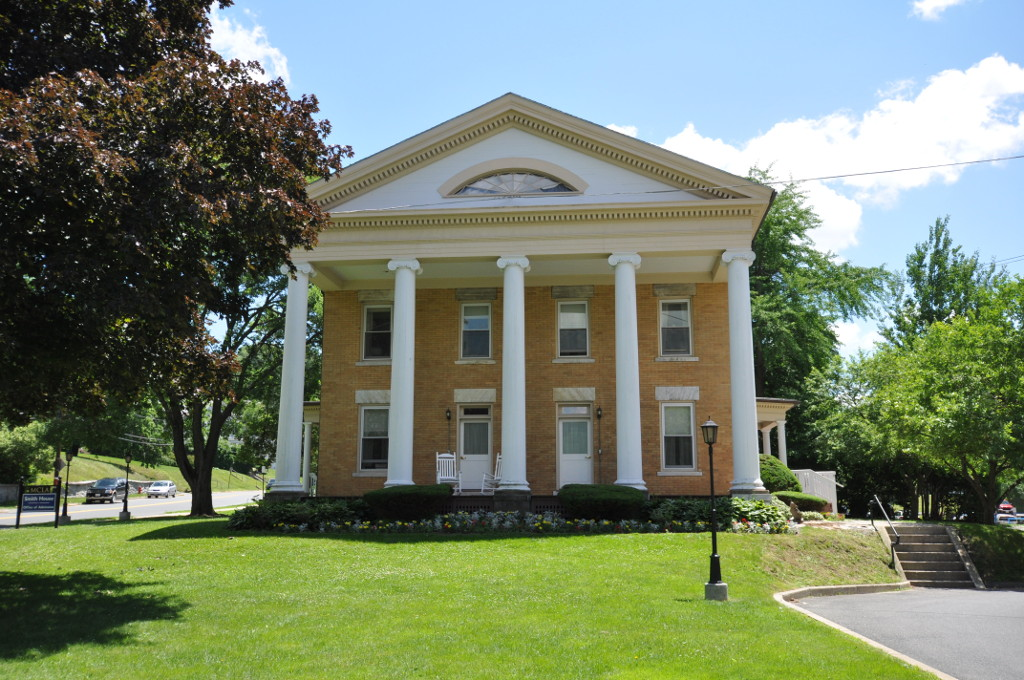
Smith House, previously the residence of the sitting college president, currently serves as administrative offices

MCLA is governed by the Massachusetts Board of Higher Education. Beyond that, MCLA has extra-institutional representation of 11 voting members and the Board of Trustees, whose members are appointed by the governor which has 11 voting members. A student representative to the board of trustees is elected every spring by the student body to sit for one academic year. Administration positions include 12 men and 24 women. Academic affairs is headed by the vice president for academic affairs. Business and finances is headed by the vice president for administration and finance. Student affairs is headed by the vice president of student affairs. The full-time instructional faculty has 52 men and 36 women. The academic governance body, All College Committee, meets an average of nine times each year.

== Publications ==
The school has two student publications: The Beacon, a weekly newspaper, and Spires, a literary magazine published each year. Radio Station WJJW broadcasts for 140 hours each week, and episodes of the student-run college TV news program, Beacon Web News, are produced once a week. MCLA also has one faculty publication: The Mind's Eye, and one alumni publication, Beacons & Seeds, which comes out twice a year.

== Athletics ==
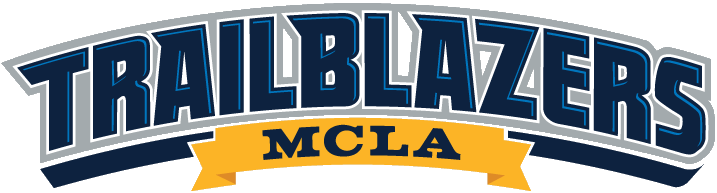
MCLA athletics wordmark

MCLA has 13 varsity sports. The college's varsity teams compete in the National Collegiate Athletic Association (NCAA) at the NCAA Division III level in the Massachusetts State Collegiate Athletic Conference (MASCAC). Active intercollegiate female teams are ice hockey, basketball, volleyball, tennis, cross country, soccer, softball, and lacrosse; while active intercollegiate male teams are ice hockey, baseball, basketball, golf, cross country, tennis and soccer. The college also has NERFU club rugby which was re-activated in 2011. The most successful team in the college's history was the men's ice hockey team, which was cut in 2003. However, MCLA established men's and women's hockey teams in the 2023–24 academic year.

From 1963, the college's athletic teams were known as the Mohawks, after the Mohawk Trail which runs along Massachusetts Route 2. In response to concerns over using a Native American name (Francis Boots, cultural-preservation officer of the Mohawk tribe, has told college officials that his people were not honored by the name), the mascot was changed to the Trailblazers in 2002. In 2013, a new mascot, the Mountain Lion, was adopted while in April 2019, the Trailblazer community named the Mascot "Murdock" after a vote of the campus community, alumni, and community members.

== Notable alumni ==
- John Barrett III - state legislator, mayor of North Adams for 26 years
- Daniel E. Bosley - member emeritus of the Mass. House of Representatives (served 1986 – 2011)
- Thomas Calter- member emeritus of the Mass. House of Representatives (served 2007 – 2018)
- Ken Hill - retired MLB player.
- Derek Lalonde - Former head coach of the Detroit Red Wings, two-time Stanley Cup champion as assistant coach of the Tampa Bay Lightning
- Gerry McDonald - retired AHL/NHL player.
- Anton Strout - urban fantasy novelist.
- Ashley Shade - city council president of North Adams (2026–present)
