= Leigh Davis (politician) =

American politician

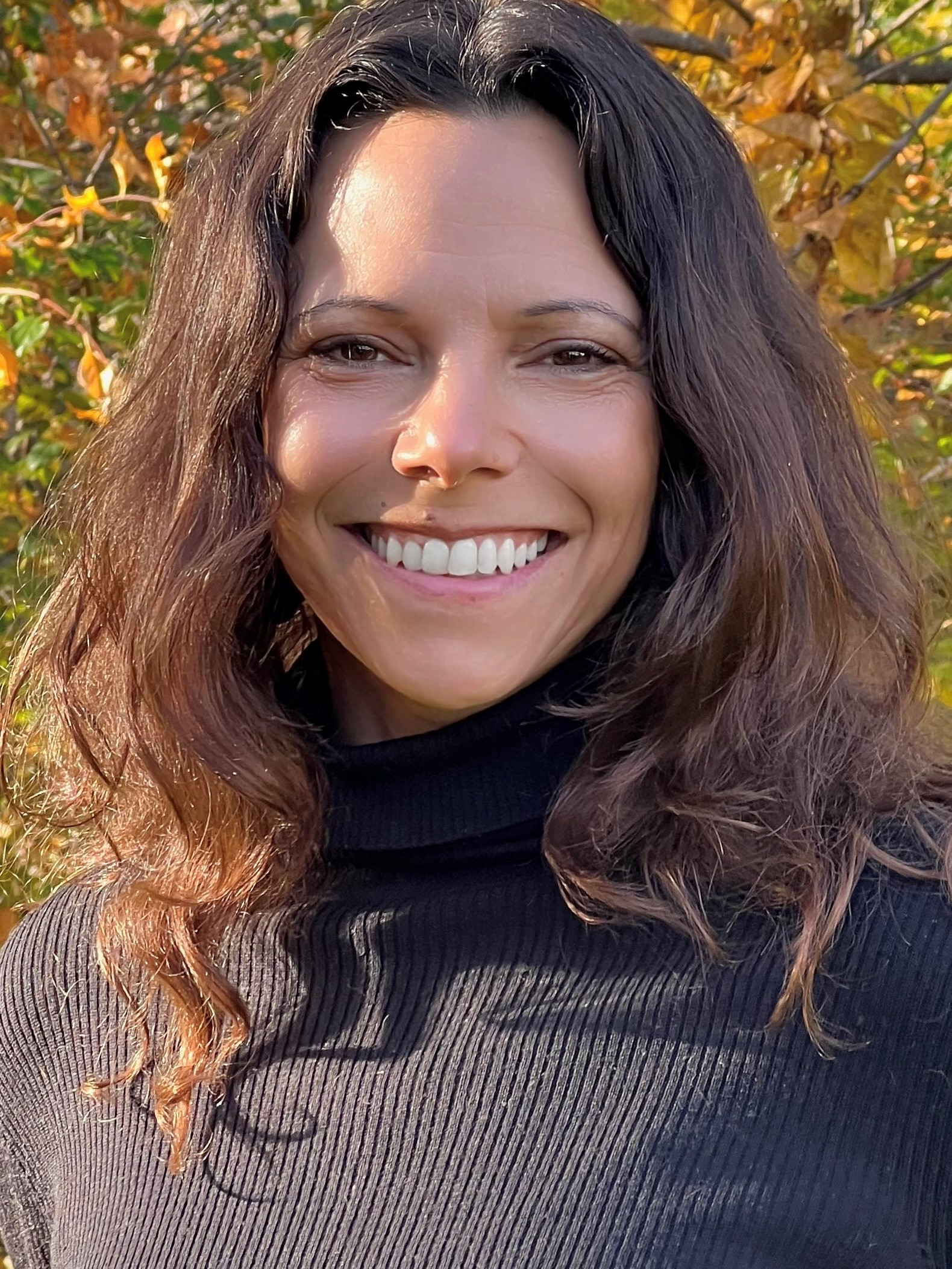

Member of the Massachusetts House of Representatives
- Incumbent
- Assumed office January 2025
- Preceded by: Smitty Pignatelli
- Constituency: 3rd Berkshire (2025-present)

Personal details
- Born: Washington, D.C., U.S.
- Party: Democratic
- Education: Ithaca College; National University of Ireland
- Website: https://www.leighdavis.org/

Leigh Davis is an American politician who has represented the 3rd Berkshire district in the Massachusetts House of Representatives since 2025. She is the first woman elected to represent the district.

== Early life, education, and professional career ==
Davis was born in Washington, D.C. and raised in Chevy Chase, Maryland. Her father, Lloyd Davis, was a senior advisor at the U.S. Department of Housing and Urban Development (HUD), where he was credited with establishing the department’s first voluntary fair housing program and its first minority business enterprise program. He later served as first vice president and chief operating officer of the Martin Luther King Jr. Center for Nonviolent Social Change and helped lead the campaign to establish Martin Luther King Jr. Day as a federal holiday. He subsequently served as executive director of the Martin Luther King Jr. Federal Holiday Commission. Her mother, Mary Kay Davis, served for many years as executive assistant to Sargent Shriver.

Davis received a bachelor's degree from Ithaca College and a master's degree from National University of Ireland, Galway. While teaching in Ireland, she was a member of the Teachers’ Union of Ireland (TUI).

=== Professional career ===
Davis worked in Los Angeles as a film and television editor and was a member of the Motion Picture Editors Guild (IATSE Local 700). After eight years, she moved to Ireland, where she continued working in film before entering academia. She became a tenured lecturer at the Galway-Mayo Institute of Technology and later chaired the Institute's Film and Television program.

Davis writes a recurring column, "Commonwealth Connections," for The Berkshire Edge, covering state government and issues affecting Berkshire County.

== Local government ==
Davis was elected to the Great Barrington Finance Committee in 2013, in her first campaign for public office. In 2019, she was elected to the Great Barrington Selectboard, where she served two three-year terms as vice chair. During her tenure, she chaired the Housing Subcommittee and served as vice chair of the Economic Development Committee.

== Massachusetts House of Representatives ==
In September 2024, Davis won a three-way Democratic primary with 55.6% of the vote. She was elected to the Massachusetts House of Representatives that November with 57.4 percent of the vote.

Davis represents 18 municipalities in Berkshire County: Alford, Becket, Dalton, Egremont, Great Barrington, Lee, Lenox, Monterey, Mount Washington, New Marlborough, Otis, Richmond, Sandisfield, Sheffield, Stockbridge, Tyringham, Washington, and West Stockbridge.

=== Legislative Work ===
Following allegations of sexual abuse involving a former teacher at Miss Hall’s School, Davis filed legislation addressing sexual misconduct by adults in positions of authority over students. Senator Joan Lovely sponsored companion legislation in the Massachusetts Senate. In July 2026, provisions based on Davis’s legislation were enacted as part of the Trusted Adults Act, which was included in the fiscal year 2027 state budget and signed into law by Governor Maura Healey.

Davis also sponsored legislation proposing the renewal and expansion of the Massachusetts Accelerated Bridge Program to finance the repair, replacement, and maintenance of structurally deficient bridges. In January 2026, Governor Healey announced a new initiative to accelerate bridge repairs during her State of the Commonwealth address, following Davis’s advocacy for reviving the program.

=== Committee assignments ===
For the 2025-26 Session, Davis serves on the following committees:

- Joint Committee on State Administration and Regulatory Oversight
- Joint Committee on Election Laws
- House Committee on Federal Funding, Policy and Accountability
- House Committee on Climate Action and Sustainability

=== Caucus memberships ===
Davis is a member of the Massachusetts Caucus of Women Legislators and the Massachusetts Black and Latino Legislative Caucus.

=== Recognition ===
In 2025, Davis was named one of MassLive’s politicians to watch and was included among five new Massachusetts lawmakers profiled by The Boston Globe. She was also profiled by State House News Service as a first-term legislator in a question-and-answer interview about her background and legislative priorities. A March 2025 InstaTrac analysis reported that Davis sponsored 25 bills, the most among first-term Massachusetts legislators.

== Personal life ==
Davis lives in Great Barrington, Massachusetts and has three children.

== See also ==
- 2025-2026 Massachusetts legislature
