= Frank D. Stafford =

American politician

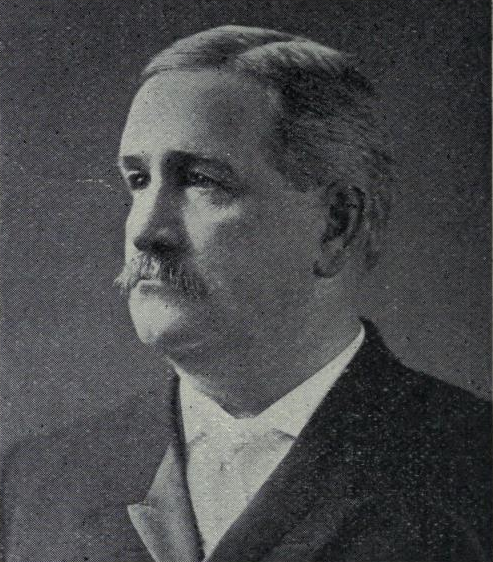

6th Mayor of North Adams, Massachusetts
- In office 1907–1908
- Preceded by: Marshall R. Ford
- Succeeded by: John H. Waterhouse

4th Mayor of North Adams, Massachusetts
- In office 1903–1904
- Preceded by: Valmore A. Whitaker
- Succeeded by: Marshall R. Ford

Member of the Vermont House of Representatives
- In office 1888–1889

Personal details
- Born: August 15, 1856 Stamford, Vermont
- Died: January 21, 1928 (aged 71) North Adams, Massachusetts
- Party: Republican
- Spouse: Flora A. Ballou
- Education: University of Vermont
- Profession: Physician

Frank Dalmon Stafford (August 15, 1856 – January 21, 1928) was an American physician and politician who served in the Vermont House of Representatives in the 1880s, and as mayor of North Adams, Massachusetts in the early 1900s.

== Early life ==
Stafford was born to Joel C. and Jane A. (Stroud) Stafford in Stamford, Vermont on August 15, 1856. Stafford attended the local public schools. Stafford attended Williamstown High School in Williamstown, Massachusetts, and studied medicine at Burlington Medical College.

He represented Windham County in the Vermont legislature in 1888 and 1889, while residing in Whitingham.

== Marriage ==
Stafford married Flora A. Ballou, the daughter of Hosea B. and Adeline (Murdock) Ballou in Whitingham.
