= Senator Gallup =

Senator Gallup may refer to:

- David Gallup (1808–1882), Connecticut State Senate
- Harvey A. Gallup (1869–1946), Massachusetts State Senate
