= William "Smitty" Pignatelli =

American politician

Smitty Pignatelli
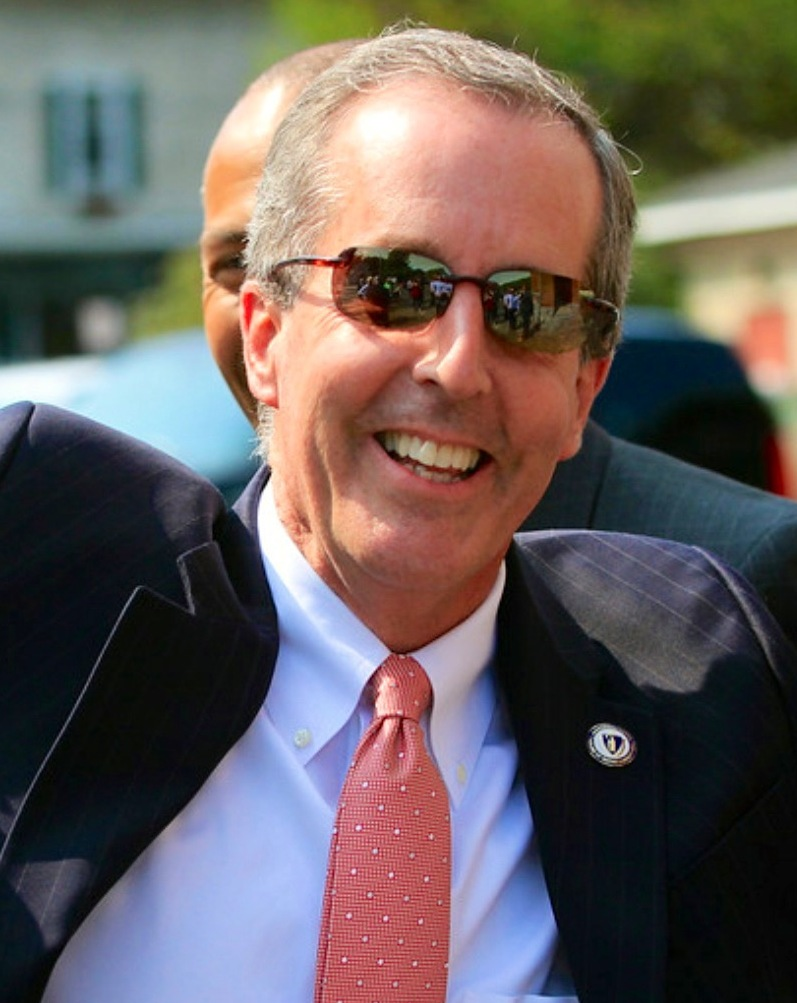

Member of the Massachusetts House of Representatives
- In office January 2003 – January 2025
- Preceded by: Christopher Hodgkins
- Succeeded by: Leigh Davis
- Constituency: 4th Berkshire (2003-2023); 3rd Berkshire (2023--2025)

Personal details
- Born: August 31, 1959 (age 66) Pittsfield, Massachusetts, U.S.
- Party: Democratic
- Education: Babson College

William "Smitty" Pignatelli (born August 31, 1959) is an American politician who served as a member of the Massachusetts House of Representatives, representing the 4th Berkshire District and later the 3rd Berkshire District.

== Political career ==
Pignatelli entered politics in 1987 when he was elected to the Lenox Planning Board. In 1992, he was elected to the Board of Selectmen, where he served until 2003. He also served as a Berkshire County Commissioner from 1995 to 1999, including two years as Chairman.

In 2002, Pignatelli was elected to the Massachusetts House of Representatives, defeating fellow Lenox resident Kevin J. Sherman by 106 votes in the Democratic primary and winning the general election with 50.2% of the vote against two candidates. He has run unopposed in six of ten subsequent general elections.

As of 2023, Pignatelli represented the towns of Alford, Becket, Egremont, Great Barrington, Lee, Lenox, Monterey, Mount Washington, New Marlborough, Otis, Richmond, Sandisfield, Sheffield, Stockbridge, Tyringham, Washington and West Stockbridge, all in Berkshire County.

On February 6, 2024, Pignatelli announced he would not seek reelection after eleven terms.

=== Leadership and Committees ===
- Vice Chair, House Committee on Rules
- Vice Chair, Joint Committee on Rules
- Joint Committee on Education
- Joint Committee on Financial Services
- Joint Committee on Tourism, Arts and Cultural Development

== See also ==
- 2019–2020 Massachusetts legislature
- 2021–2022 Massachusetts legislature
