= Massachusetts House of Representatives' 1st Berkshire district =

American legislative district

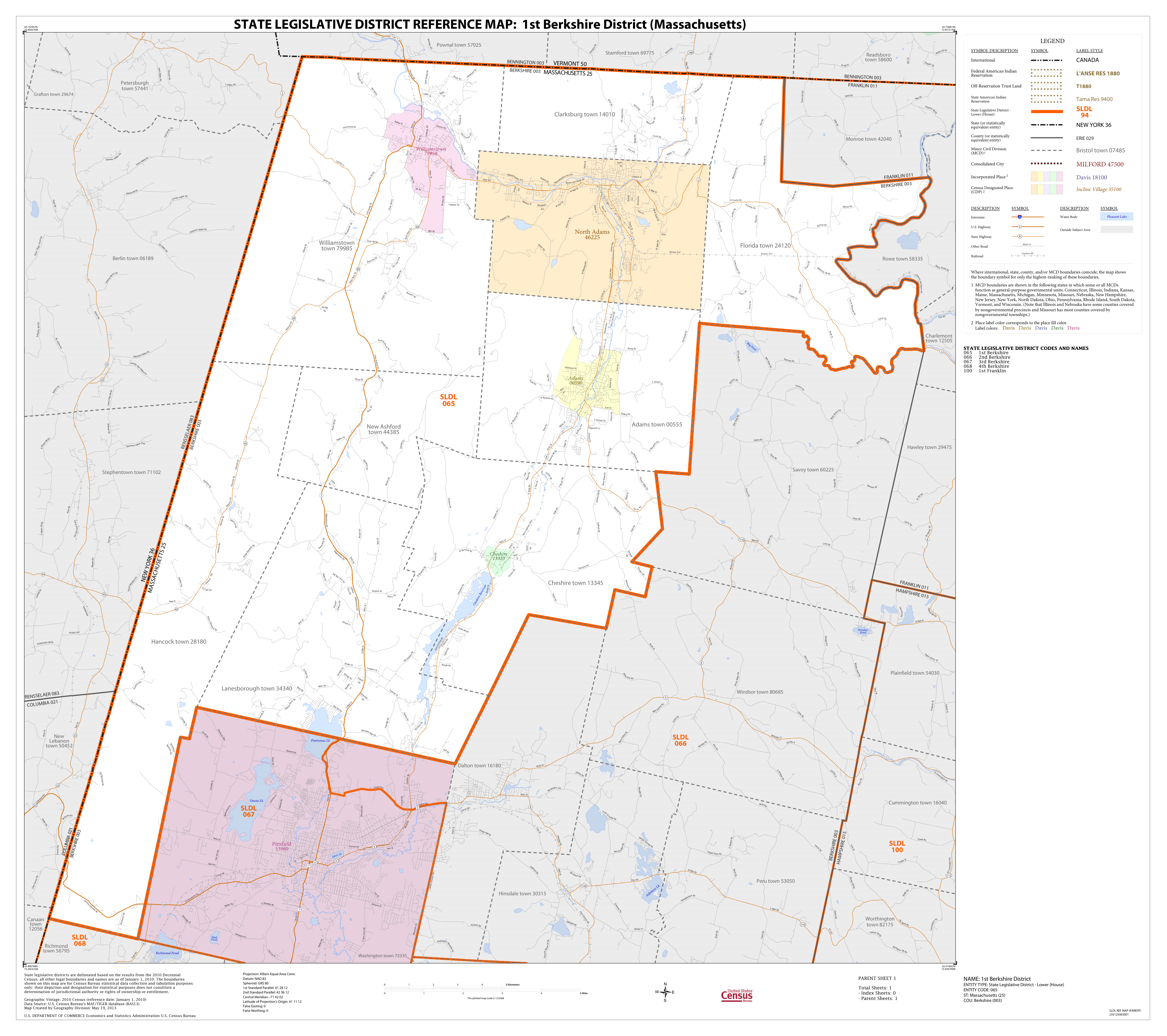
Map of Massachusetts House of Representatives' 1st Berkshire district, based on the 2010 United States census.

Massachusetts House of Representatives' 1st Berkshire district in the United States is one of 160 legislative districts included in the lower house of the Massachusetts General Court. It covers part of Berkshire County. Democrat John Barrett of North Adams has represented the district since 2017.

== Towns represented ==
The district includes the following localities:

- Adams
- Cheshire
- Clarksburg
- Florida
- Hancock
- Lanesborough
- New Ashford
- North Adams
- Williamstown

The current district geographic boundary overlaps with that of the Massachusetts Senate's Berkshire, Hampshire, Franklin and Hampden district.

== Representatives ==
- Calvin R. Taft, circa 1858
- William T. Filley, circa 1859
- George H. Kearn, circa 1888
- Henry S. Lyons, circa 1888
- Hugh Drysdale, circa 1908
- Alton Leroy Bellows, circa 1918
- James Tracy Potter, circa 1920
- Joseph N. Roach, circa 1923-1951
- Roger Sala, circa 1953-1967
- Frank J. Matrango, circa 1975
- Frank N. Costa, 1983–1987
- Daniel E. Bosley, 1987–2011
- Gailanne Cariddi, 2011 – June 2017
- John P. Barrett, III, 2017-current

== See also ==
- Other Berkshire County districts of the Massachusetts House of Representatives: 2nd, 3rd, 4th
- List of Massachusetts House of Representatives elections
- List of Massachusetts General Courts
- List of former districts of the Massachusetts House of Representatives

== Images ==
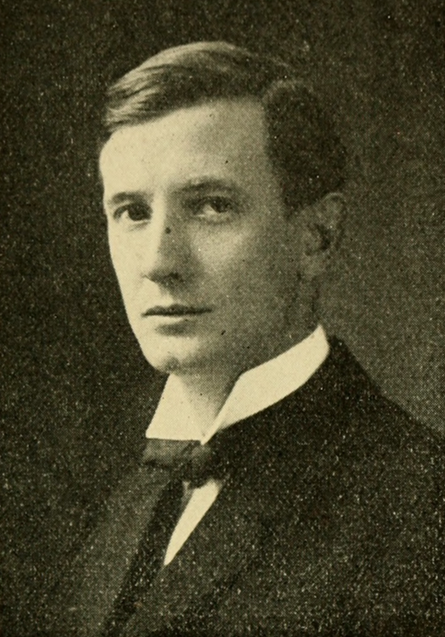
Hugh Drysdale

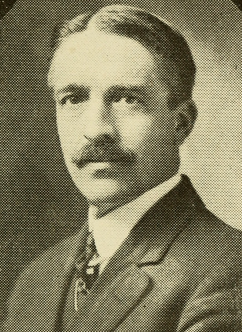
Alton Leroy Bellows

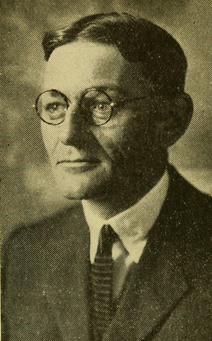
Joseph Roach

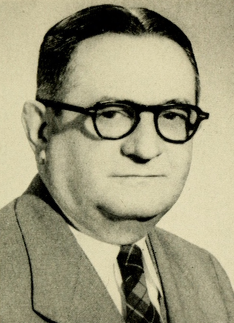
Roger Sala

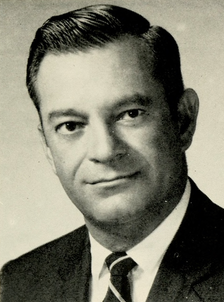
Frank Matrango

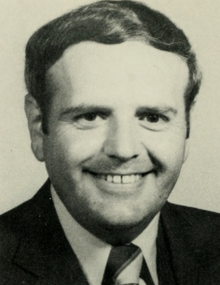
Frank Costa

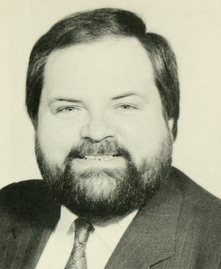
Daniel Bosley
