= Jonathan Waterhouse =

English cricketer (born 1965)

Personal information
- Full name: Jonathan Arthur Waterhouse
- Born: 11 April 1965 (age 61); Leek, Staffordshire, England
- Batting: Right-handed

Domestic team information
- Years: Team
- 1985–1997: Staffordshire

Career statistics
Competition	List A
Matches	3
Runs scored	76
Batting average	25.33
100s/50s	–/1
Top score	52
Balls bowled	–
Wickets	–
Bowling average	–
5 wickets in innings	–
10 wickets in match	–
Best bowling	–
Catches/stumpings	2/–
- Source: Cricinfo, 20 June 2011

Jonathan Arthur Waterhouse (born 11 April 1965) is a former English cricketer. Waterhouse was a right-handed batsman. He was born in Leek, Staffordshire.

Waterhouse made his debut for Staffordshire in the 1985 Minor Counties Championship against Northumberland. He played Minor counties cricket for Staffordshire from 1985 to 1997, which included 52 Minor Counties Championship matches and four MCCA Knockout Trophy matches. In 1988, he made his List A debut against Surrey in the NatWest Trophy. He played two further List A matches for Staffordshire, against Hampshire in the 1993 NatWest Trophy and Derbyshire in the 1996 NatWest Trophy. In his three matches, he scored 76 runs at an average of 25.33. He made a single half century: 52 runs against Surrey.
