= John H. Waterhouse =

American politician (1870–1948)

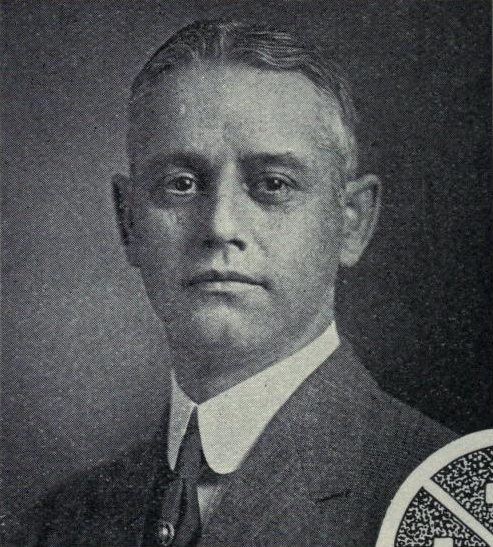

7th Mayor of North Adams, Massachusetts
- In office 1909–1910
- Preceded by: Frank D. Stafford
- Succeeded by: Charles L. Frink

Personal details
- Born: March 1, 1870 East Greenwich, New York
- Died: April 29, 1948 (aged 78) Springfield, Massachusetts, U.S.
- Party: Republican
- Spouse(s): Charlotte Archer, (d. 1913)
- Children: John A. Waterhouse; William S. Waterhouse; Charlotte L. Waterhouse
- Profession: Wool Manufacturer

John H. Waterhouse (March 1, 1870 – April 29, 1948) was an American businessman and politician who served as the 7th Mayor of North Adams, Massachusetts.

== Mayoral Elections ==
=== 1908 Election ===
Waterhouse was elected Mayor of North Adams in the election held on December 15, 1908.

=== 1909 Election ===
Waterhouse was reelected in December 1909. In 1909 he defeated the Democratic party candidate, John H. Riley, by a majority of 262 votes. The vote totals were 1648 for Waterhouse, and 1386 for Riley.

== Business career ==
Waterhouse began his career in the wool industry working at a wool mill in Lawrence, Massachusetts. Waterhouse was, with Theodore Howard, a member of the manufacturing firm of Waterhouse and Howard which, in 1905 leased the Eagle Mill in North Adams and operated it as a wollen mill. Waterhouse was the operator of Blackinton Woolen Mill in North Adams from 1910 to its liquidation in 1939.

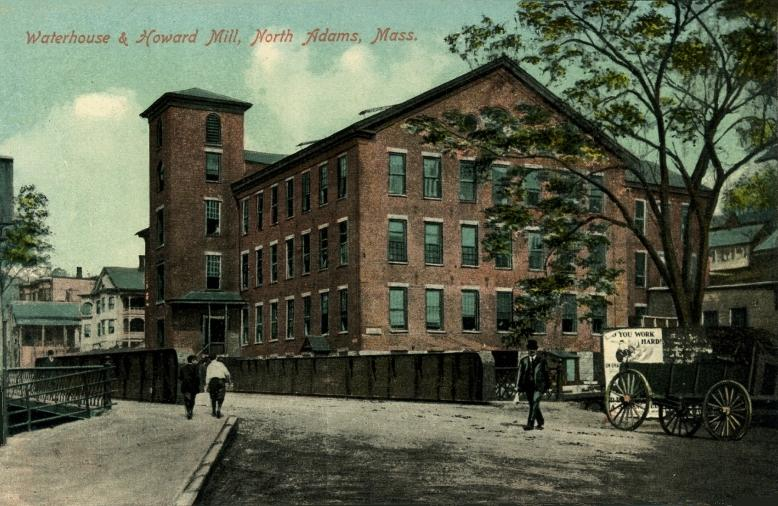
Waterhouse & Howard Mill, on North Eagle Street, North Adams, Massachusetts

== Notes ==
Political offices
| Preceded by Frank D. Stafford | 7th Mayor of North Adams, Massachusetts; 1909–1910 | Succeeded by Charles L. Frink |
