= List of mayors of North Adams, Massachusetts =

This is a list of mayors of North Adams, Massachusetts. North Adams became a city in 1895.

== Mayors ==
#	Mayor	Picture	Term	Party	Notes
1	Albert Charles Houghton		1896–1898	Republican Democratic	(April 13, 1844 – August 11, 1914) The first mayor of North Adams, Houghton was nominated by both the Democratic Party and the Republican Party during both of his mayoral terms. He was considered a quiet mayor who presided over the first two years of North Adams' incorporation as a city. A business magnate, Houghton owned significant properties in North Adams such as the Beaver and Eclipse Mills during and after his tenure as Mayor.
2	Hiram Torrey Cady		1898–1900	Democratic (1898-1899) Republican (1899-1900)	(January 17, 1843 - January 8, 1917) He was born on January 17, 1843, in North Adams, Massachusetts. He died on January 8, 1917, in Hartford, Connecticut.
3	Edward Shepard Wilkinson		1900-October 14, 1902	Republican	(March 21, 1842 – October 14, 1902) He was born on March 21, 1842. He worked as a banker. He died in office on October 14, 1902, in an Albany, New York hospital as a result of an operation performed for an abscess on his kidneys.
Acting mayor.	Valmore Augustus Whitaker		1902–1903	Republican	(March 14, 1835 - ?) He was born March 14, 1835, in North Adams, Massachusetts, to Ezra Douglas Whitaker and Amanda M. Jones. In 1905 Whitaker was the Republican candidate for mayor, he lost to the incumbent, Mayor Marshall R. Ford.
4	Frank D. Stafford		1903–1905	Republican	(August 15, 1856 - ?) This was his first term. He was born on August 15, 1856, to Joel C. Stafford and Jane A. Stroud in Stamford, Vermont. Stafford attended the local public schools then Williamstown High School in Williamstown, Massachusetts. He studied medicine at Burlington Medical College. He represented Windham County in the Vermont legislature in 1888 and 1889, while residing in Whitingham. He married Flora A. Ballou, the daughter of Hosea B. Ballou and Adeline Murdock.
5	Marshall Rufus Ford		1905–1907	Democratic	
6	Frank D. Stafford		1907–1909	Republican	This was his second tenure.
7	John H. Waterhouse		1909–1911	Republican	(March 1, 1870 - April 29, 1948) He was born on March 1, 1870, in Rhode Island. Waterhouse began his career in the wool industry working at a wool mill in Lawrence, Massachusetts. Waterhouse was, with Theodore Howard, a member of the manufacturing firm of Waterhouse and Howard which, in 1905 leased the Eagle Mill in North Adams and operated it as a wollen mill. Waterhouse was the operator of Blackinton Woolen Mill in North Adams from 1910 to its liquidation in 1939.
8	Charles Lyman Frink		1911–1913	Republican	(February 16, 1849 – January 1937). He served as a deputy United States Marshal.
9	Wallace Everett Brown		1913–1916	Republican Independent	(June 29, 1853 – April 4, 1930) during his 1913 bid for reelection, he failed to get renominated by the city's Republican committee. Despite this, Brown would go on to win the election as an independent. he would later be renominated by the Republicans in his successful 1914 reelection bid.
10	John W Gale		1916-1917	Democratic	
11	Ezra Douglas Whitaker		1917–1921	Republican Independent	(December 11, 1874 – October 24, 1936) He was born on December 11, 1874, to Valmore Augustus Whitaker and Emma Louise Beckwith. Whitaker received his early education at the Worcester Academy. He receives his A.B. from Yale College in 1898. After he graduated from Yale, Whitaker went to work for the North Adams Savings Bank and was a director of the Hoosac Valley Street Railway. On April 30, 1900, Whitaker married Josephine Coenen of Springfield, Massachusetts. They had three daughters, including Josephine D. Whitaker. He died on October 24, 1936.
12	Harvey Alpheus Gallup		1921–1923	Republican	(October 16, 1869 - August 6, 1946) In 1891 Gallup formed the Harvey A. Gallup Agency with his brother Clarence.
13	William Kirk Greer		1923–1925	Republican	
14	William Henry Johnson		1925–1933	People's Candidate Democratic	He was born in Copake, New York February 26, 1871. This was his first tenure as Mayor. Despite initially being a registered republican, Johnson ran under the designation of People's Candidate and successfully courted the Democratic Party into supporting his campaign. He was elected twice as the Exalter Ruler of the North Adams Elks lodge. He died on May 7, 1941, aged 70.
15	Archie James Pratt		1933–1935	Republican	(July 13, 1880 – November 1959). Pratt was, with Ed Price, the co-owner of Rice's Drug Store on the corner of Main and Eagle streets in North Adams.
16	William Henry Johnson		1935–1937	People's Candidate	This was his fifth non-consecutive term as mayor. Johnson was the longest-serving mayor in North Adams history until John Barrett III surpassed his record in 1993 by winning a 6th term. Unlike previous elections, Johnson was not co-nominated by the Democratic Party. Johnson won against Mayor Archie J. Pratt in a rematch of the 1932 election. Johnson would lose his bid for a 6th term against Francis J. O'Hara.
17	Francis J. O'Hara		1937–1941	Democratic Republican	O'Hara was the second mayor jointly nominated by the Democratic and Republican Party. This was primarily due to the local parties being opposed to a resurgent Johnson. O'Hara would lose his bid for a third term primarily due to the collapse of his political alliance and the emergence of anti-establishment candidate Faxon Bowen in the 1940 election.
18	Faxon Bowen		1941–1943	Independent	
19	Cornelius E. O'Brien		1943–1947	Democratic	
20	James A. Bowes		1947–1952	Democratic	
21	Ernest Henry Rosasco		1952–1954	Republican	(August 4, 1907 – July 1985) was born in North Adams, Massachusetts, to Giovanni B. Rosasco, a police captain; and Virginia Gazzaniga. Virginia died in 1930 and Giovani died in 1949. He had four brothers, Medeo, John B, William P, and Francis W, and William, and two sisters, Mary and Margaret. His wife was Mary A. Fachini. He graduated from Williams College in 1929 and from Harvard Law school in 1932. He practiced law in North Adams for ten years, and was a member of the North Adams city council from 1938 to 1941. From 1940 to 1942, he was a member of the advisory committee of the local draft board, and in November 1942 he joined the United States Army, enlisting as a private to serve in World War II. He served in the 4th Armored division in Europe until November 1945. He was granted a battlefield commission as lieutenant during the war, and was discharged with the rank of 2nd lieutenant. He died in July 1985.
22	James M. Lilly		1954–1956	Democratic	(July 17, 1891 - July 1978)
23	Julius Mark Calvi		1956–1958	Democratic	(May 19, 1917 – January 22, 2009)
24	Joseph Raymond Bianco		1958–1960	Democratic	(March 19, 1914 – March 3, 2000). This was his first term. Bianco was the last mayor elected under a Massachusetts Plan D form of government and the last mayor to be elected by a vote of the City Council rather than a popular vote.
25	Louis J. Diamond		1960–1962	Democratic	First mayor elected under a Massachusetts Plan B form of government. Diamond would lose his reelection bid to Francis Constant Florini in 1961.
26	Francis Constant Florini		1962–1968	Republican	Last mayor elected under a Massachusetts Plan B form of Government. In 1967, Florini lost reelection to James F. Cleary.
27	James F. Cleary		1968–1970	Democratic	
28	Joseph Raymond Bianco		1970–1978	Democratic	This was his second tenure as Mayor. Bianco was elected in 1969 with an almost 2-1 margin against fellow City Councilor Robert E. Patenaude. Bianco would serve for eight years making him North Adams' longest serving mayor at the time.
29	Richard Charles Lamb		1978–1983	Democratic	In 1977 Lamb, then 28 years old, was elected mayor over Louis R. Sinclitico. On election day, November 8, 1977, Lamb received fifty seven percent of the vote against Sinclitico who received forty two percent. He resigned from office in 1983.
Acting mayor.	John R. Taft, Jr.		1983	Democratic	(April 28, 1954 – June 3, 2007 ) He was president of the North Adams, Massachusetts, city council and, in 1983, as the acting mayor. He was born on April 28, 1954, in North Adams, Massachusetts, to Therese Judge and John R. Taft Sr. Taft graduated with honors from Drury High School. Taft was a member of the North Adams City Council from 1980 to 1985. Taft was the president of the North Adams City Council. In 1983 Taft served, for two months as the acting mayor of North Adams. In the 1985 mayoral election Taft ran against incumbent Mayor John Barrett III. Of the 4,373 votes cast in the election Barrett received 3,718 votes and Taft received 655. Taft died on June 3, 2007, at the Veterans' Hospital in West Haven, Connecticut.
30	John Barrett III		1984–2010	Democratic	Barrett is the longest serving mayor in North Adams history with twenty-six consecutive years in office. Elected in 1983, Barrett was mayor during the closure of Sprague Electric and led the transition of the North Adams economy towards the "creative economy". He was an influential figure in the construction of the Massachusetts Museum of Contemporary Arts which opened in 1999. Barrett would lose his bid for a 14th term in office to Richard J. Alcombright.
31	Richard J. Alcombright		2010-2018	Democratic	
32	Thomas Bernard		2018-2022	Democratic	
33	Jennifer Macksey		2022-	Democratic	First female mayor.
