= WBRL (AM) =

Radio station in Berlin, New Hampshire

- Berlin, New Hampshire; United States
- Frequency: 1400 kHz

Programming
- Format: Adult contemporary

Ownership
- Owner: Metrocomco, Inc.

History
- First air date: August 8, 1962; 1980 (second license)
- Last air date: October 1979 (first license); 1990
- Call sign meaning: Berlin

Technical information
- Facility ID: 41372
- Class: C
- Power: 1,000 watts
- Transmitter coordinates: 44°28′55.2″N 71°10′55.2″W

WBRL was a radio station that broadcast on 1400 AM in Berlin, New Hampshire. Under two separate license incarnations from 1962 to 1979 and again from 1980 to 1990, the station served the Berlin area. The last owner of WBRL was Metrocomco, Inc.

== History ==
=== First license ===
WBRL went on the air August 8, 1962, with 250 watts on 1400 kHz. The construction permit had originally been held by William Rust; however, Rust was required to divest an AM station in order to complete the purchase of an AM-FM combo in Rochester, New York. This prompted competing Berlin station WMOU to accuse Rust of trafficking in station licenses; Rust emphasized the sale made him no profit and said WMOU had no standing to contest the sale. With the transfer of Good Radio, Inc., to four new principals approved by the Federal Communications Commission on July 25, the station was clear to sign on. In 1966, Chester Steadman, owner of WCNL in Newport, New Hampshire, acquired WBRL for $58,000.

Steadman sold WBRL for $44,000 in 1971 to Berlin Communications, controlled by Richard and Roberta Blais, who owned a cable system. The station joined the American Information Network from ABC Radio immediately after the sale. Another improvement, this time technical, came in 1972 when WBRL was approved to increase its daytime power from 250 to 1,000 watts.

On April 23, 1975, the Federal Communications Commission in separate proceedings designated the license of WBRL (and, on the same day, those of WMOU and WXLQ FM in Berlin) for hearing, saying the proceeding was necessary to determine if the station had engaged in fraudulent double billing practices. A year after the hearing, on September 2, 1976, administrative law judge Byron E. Harrison denied the renewal application, noting that WBRL continued to double-bill "based on private business judgment" even when it knew the practice was illegal, saying that the public interest would not be served by a renewal. Two months before, the FCC had denied the WMOU/WXLQ renewal on the same grounds—which would have left Berlin without any local radio stations. Owner Blais announced plans to appeal the initial decision, saying that it was "very, very difficult" to be part of a three-station market in a town of 15,000.

In December 1977, the WBRL case moved from the administrative law judge to the FCC itself as the commission heard oral argument in the station's appeal. In May 1978, the FCC in a 6–0 decision upheld the law judge's findings and the denial of the renewal application, saying that WBRL's scheme had run for more than three years and enabled retailers to overcharge manufacturers more than $22,000; while Blais had known of the issues since buying the station, general manager Robert T. Dale, who had also been involved in the double billing at WMOU/WXLQ, had said that stopping the practice would cause the station to lose advertisers, and Blais did not protest again until the FCC began investigating in 1974. The FCC also said Blais would have been responsible even if he did not know of the billing before 1974. That October, Berlin Communications was denied reconsideration of the FCC decision; in 1979, a federal appeals court upheld the denial, forcing the top 40 outlet to cease broadcasting.

=== Second license ===
On February 15, 1980, McLaughlin Broadcasting Company, Inc., filed an application for a new radio station in Berlin to use WBRL's facilities. The FCC granted the application on May 23, 1980, and a new WBRL was on the air by June 20, 1980. Under McLaughlin, the station broadcast a middle-of-the-road music format, and Roberta Blais served as the program manager. McLaughlin sold WBRL in 1982 to Friendly Broadcasting Corporation for $125,000. That sale never consummated, and McLaughlin sold the station for $185,000 in 1983 to Metrocomco, Inc.

Late in the 1980s, WBRL entered financial difficulties, and its assets were put up for auction on May 21, 1990. By 1992, WBRL was silent, and the FCC designated its license renewal for hearing in 1993, leading to its deletion.
