= John Barrett (Massachusetts politician) =

American politician

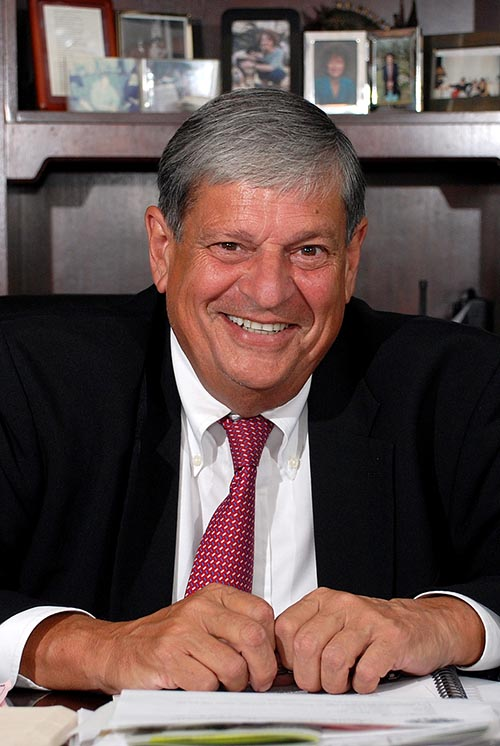

Member of the Massachusetts House of Representatives from the 1st Berkshire district
- Incumbent
- Assumed office November 2017
- Preceded by: Gailanne Cariddi

30th Mayor of North Adams
- In office January 1, 1984 – January 1, 2010
- Preceded by: Richard Charles Lamb
- Succeeded by: Richard Alcombright

Commissioner of Berkshire County
- In office 1977–1981

Member of the Northern Berkshire Regional School District Committee
- In office 1976–1983

Personal details
- Born: John Barrett III; May 16, 1947 (age 79)
- Party: Democratic
- Education: Massachusetts College of Liberal Arts
- Occupation: Legislator

John Barrett III (born 1947) is an American politician serving as a Democratic member of the Massachusetts House of Representatives. He was elected to the post on November 7, 2017, filling the vacant seat previously held by Gailanne Cariddi, who had died of cancer in June 2017. He represents the furthest northwest district in the state, the 1st Berkshire district. Barrett currently serves as chair of the House Committee on Ethics. Barrett was reelected to the House of Representatives in 2018.

Barrett previously served as the mayor of North Adams for twenty-six years, from 1984 to 2009, making him at the time the longest-serving mayor in the state. As mayor, he was noted for his efforts to revive the city's economy after the closure of a leading employer, Sprague Electric, and as a supporter of the Massachusetts Museum of Contemporary Art, which opened in the former Sprague facility in 1999. In his 2009 bid for a fourteenth term, he was defeated by council member Dick Alcombright. He won a term on the city council in 2011, then lost to Alcombright in another run for mayor in 2015.

He attended North Adams State College, now known as Massachusetts College of Liberal Arts (MCLA), where he received bachelor's and master's degrees as well as an honorary doctor of public service degree and the distinguished alumni award, and in 2016 he was named to MCLA's board of trustees on which he served until 2025.

== See also ==
- List of mayors of North Adams, Massachusetts
- 2019–2020 Massachusetts legislature
- 2021–2022 Massachusetts legislature
- 2023–2024 Massachusetts legislature
