= Massachusetts House of Representatives =

Lower house of the Massachusetts General Court

Coordinates: 42°21′31.2″N 71°3′50.9″W

- 194th General Court of Massachusetts

Type
- Type: Lower house of the Massachusetts General Court
- Term limits: None

History
- New session started: January 4, 2023

Leadership
- Speaker: Ron Mariano (D) since December 30, 2020
- Speaker pro tempore: Kate Hogan (D) since February 11, 2021
- Majority Leader: Michael Moran (D) since February 10, 2023
- Minority Leader: Bradley Jones (R) since November 21, 2002

Structure
- Seats: 160
- Political groups: Majority (132): Democratic (131); Independent (1); Minority (25): Republican (25); Vacant (3): Vacant (3)
- Length of term: 2 years
- Authority: Chapter 1 of the Massachusetts Constitution
- Salary: $70,537/year; set to increase every two years equal to the increase in the median salary of Massachusetts. All members receive office stipends, and chairs of committees and party leaders receive additional stipends.

Elections
- Voting system: First-past-the-post
- Last election: November 5, 2024
- Next election: November 3, 2026
- Redistricting: Legislative control

Meeting place
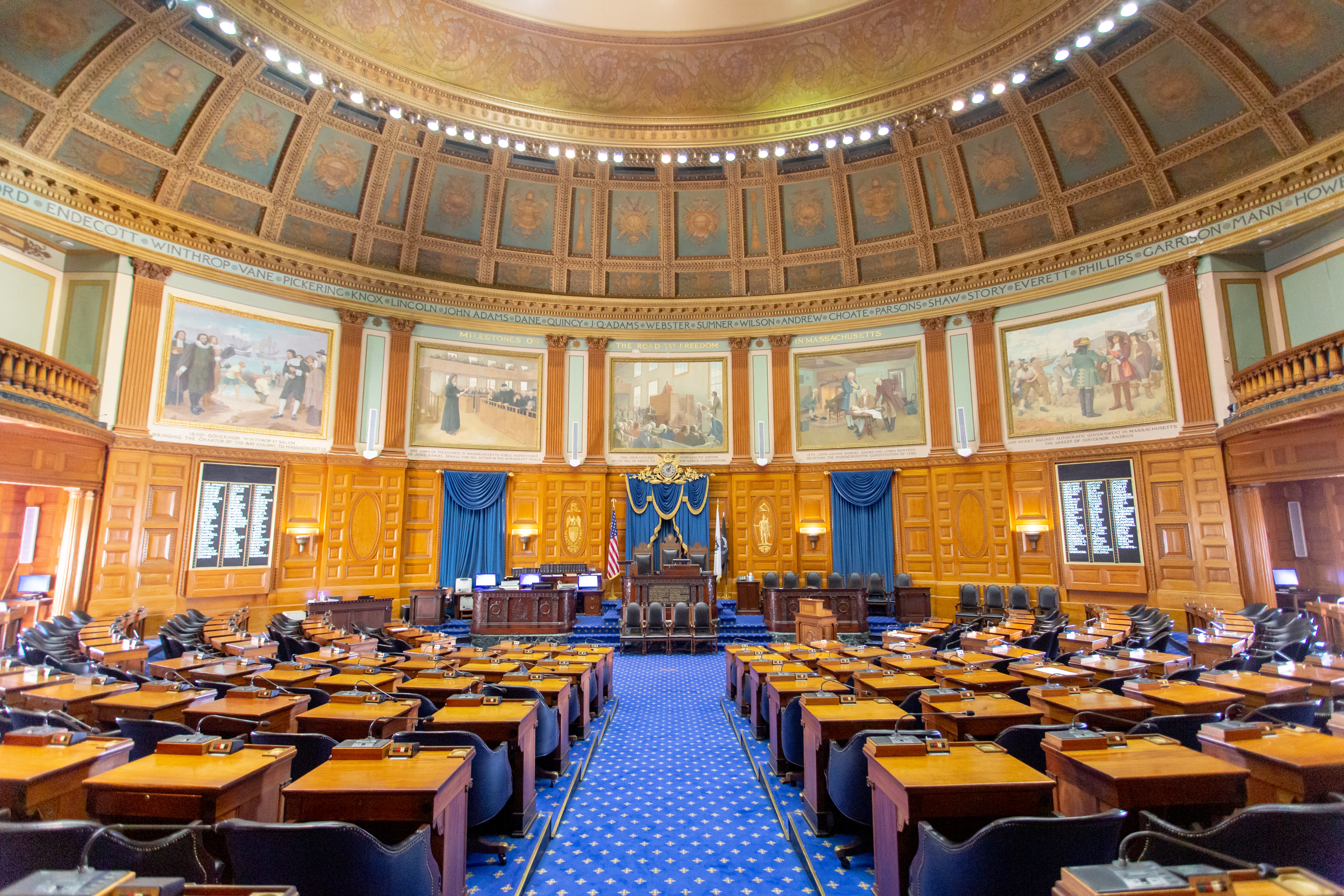
- House of Representatives Chamber; Massachusetts State House; Boston, Massachusetts

Website
- Massachusetts House of Representatives

Rules
- Rules of the Massachusetts House of Representatives

The Massachusetts House of Representatives is the lower house of the Massachusetts General Court, the state legislature of Massachusetts. It is composed of 160 members elected from 14 counties each divided into single-member electoral districts across the Commonwealth. The House of Representatives convenes at the Massachusetts State House in Boston, the state capital of Massachusetts.

== Qualifications ==
Any person seeking to get elected to the Massachusetts House of Representatives must meet the following qualifications:

- Be at least 18 years of age
- Be a registered voter in Massachusetts
- Be an inhabitant of the district for at least one year prior to election
- Receive at least 150 signatures on nomination papers

== Representation ==
Originally, representatives were apportioned by town. For the first 150 persons, one representative was granted, and this ratio increased as the population of the town increased. The largest membership of the House was 749 in 1812 (214 of these being from the District of Maine); the largest House without Maine was 635 in 1837. The original distribution was changed to the current regional population system in the 20th century. Until 1978, there were 240 members of the house, a number in multi-member districts; today there are 160 in single-member districts.

Districts are named for the counties they are in and tend to stay within one county, although districts often cross county lines. Representatives serve two-year terms which are not limited.

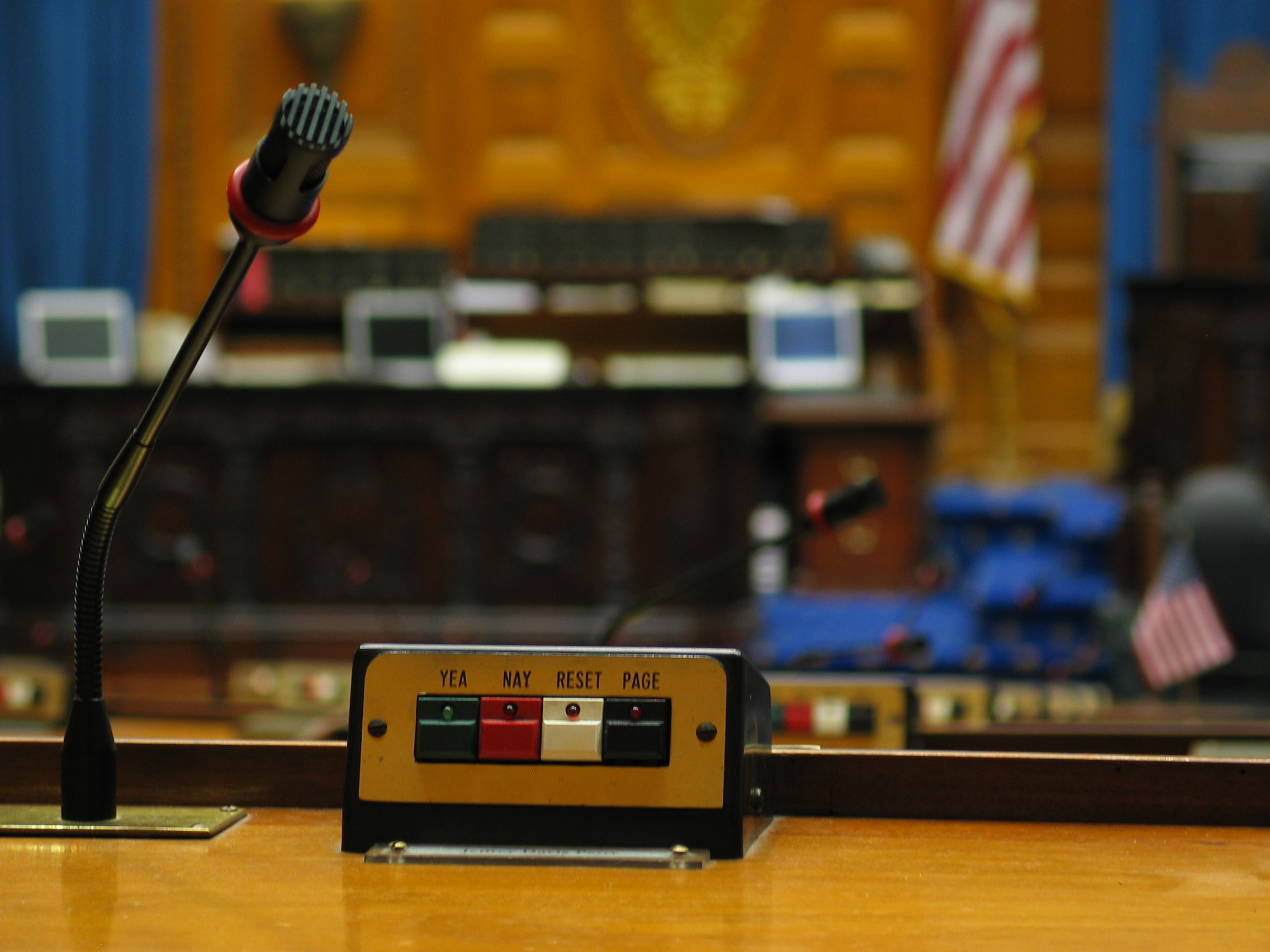
Representatives' desk with microphone and voting buttons (yea/nay)

== The Sacred Cod ==
Within the House's debating chamber hangs the Sacred Cod of Massachusetts. The 5-foot-long (1.5 m) pine carving of the cod was offered by Representative John Rowe in 1784 in commemoration of the state's maritime economy and history. Two previous carvings of the cod existed during the legislature's colonial era; the first destroyed in a fire in 1747, and the second during the American War of Independence. Since 1784, the current Sacred Cod has been present at nearly every House session, and moved to its current location when the House began convening in the State House in 1798.

In 1933, members of the Harvard Lampoon stole the cod carving as part of a prank. The theft sparked a large statewide search by the Boston and Massachusetts State Police. Following outrage from Boston newspapers and the General Court itself, the cod was anonymously handed back.

== Composition ==
The Democrats hold a supermajority in the House.

Affiliation	Party (Shading indicates majority caucus)			Total	Vacant
Affiliation	Democratic	Unenrolled	Republican	Total	Vacant
187th (2011–2012)	128	0	32	160	0
188th (2013–2014)	131	0	29	160	0
189th (2015–2016)	127	0	35	160	0
190th (2017–2018)	125	0	35	160	0
191st (2019–2020)	127	1	32	160	0
192nd (2021–2022)	128	1	30	159	1
Begin 193rd (2023–2024)	132	1	26	159	1
End 193rd	132	1	24	157	3
Begin 194th (2025–2026)	134	1	25	160	0

== Leadership ==
The Speaker of the House presides over the House of Representatives. The Speaker is elected by the majority party caucus followed by confirmation of the full House through the passage of a House Resolution. As well as presiding over the body, the Speaker is also the chief leader, and controls the flow of legislation. Other House leaders, such as the majority and minority leaders, are elected by their respective party caucuses relative to their party's strength in the House.

== Past composition of the House of Representatives ==
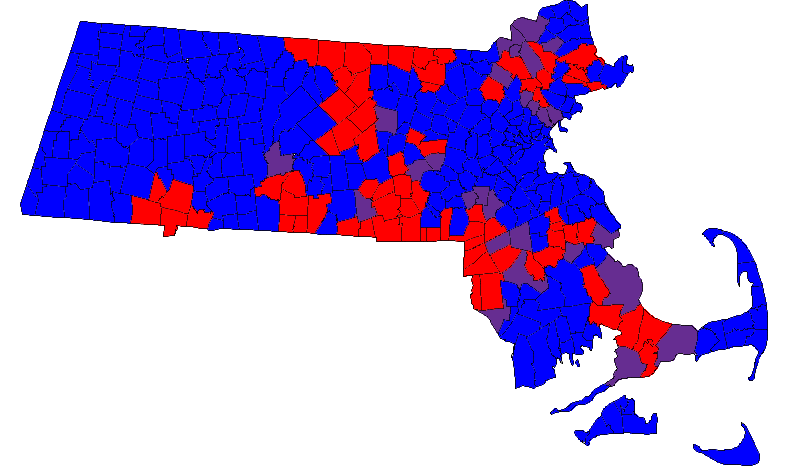
Composition by municipality in the 187th General Court.

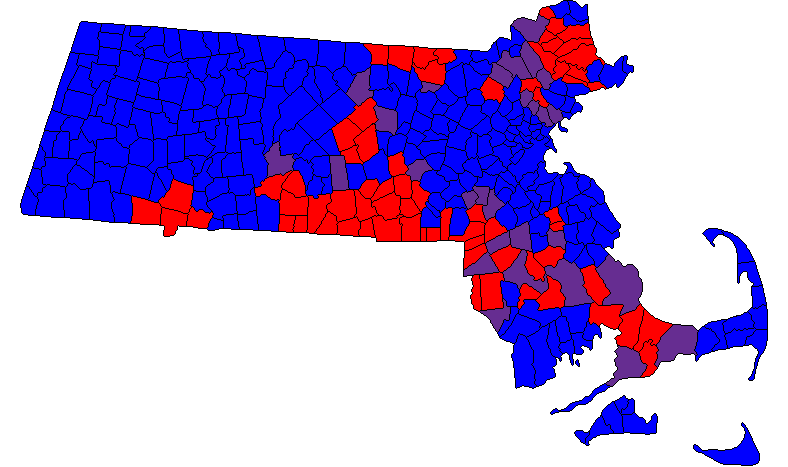
Composition by municipality in the 188th General Court.

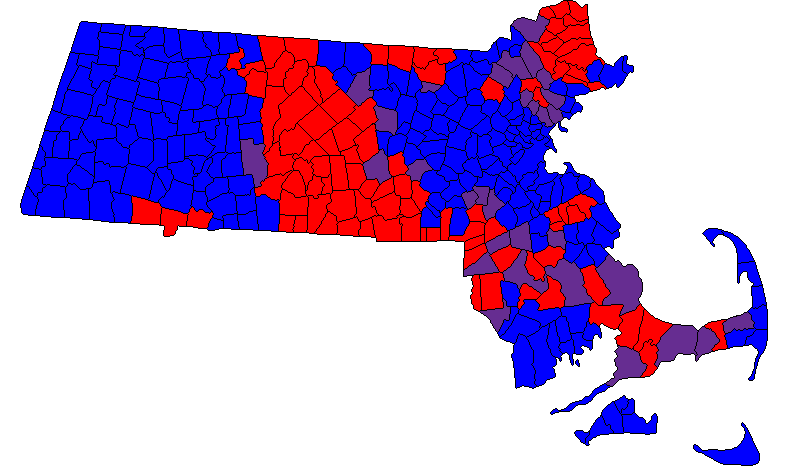
Composition by municipality in the 189th General Court.

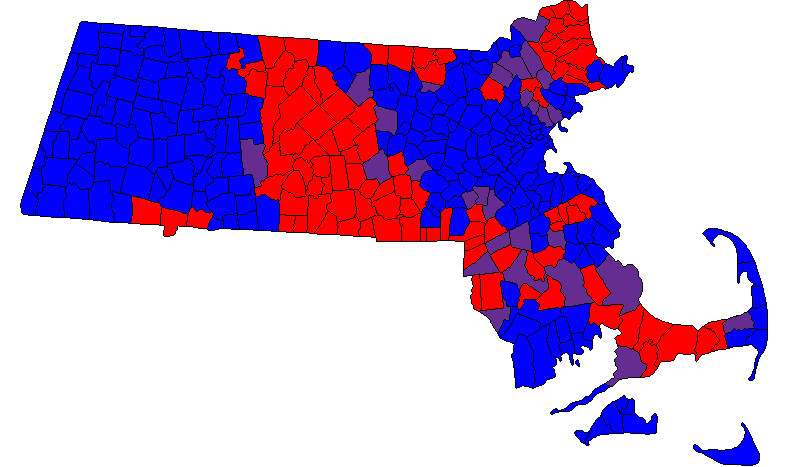
Composition by municipality at the beginning of the 190th General Court.

Composition by municipality at the beginning of the 191st General Court.

== See also ==
- 2023–2024 Massachusetts legislature
- List of current Massachusetts House of Representatives committees
- List of speakers of the Massachusetts House of Representatives
- Massachusetts State House
- Massachusetts Senate
- Massachusetts General Court
- List of former districts of the Massachusetts House of Representatives
- List of members of the colonial Massachusetts House of Representatives
- List of Massachusetts General Courts
- Massachusetts Government
