= 2022 Massachusetts House of Representatives election =

- November 8, 2022

All 160 seats in the Massachusetts House of Representatives 81 seats needed for a majority
- Registered: 4,884,076
- Turnout: 51.42% (▼24.58%)
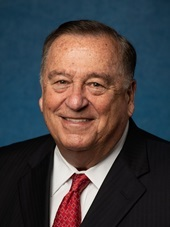

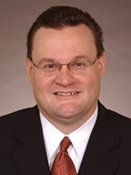

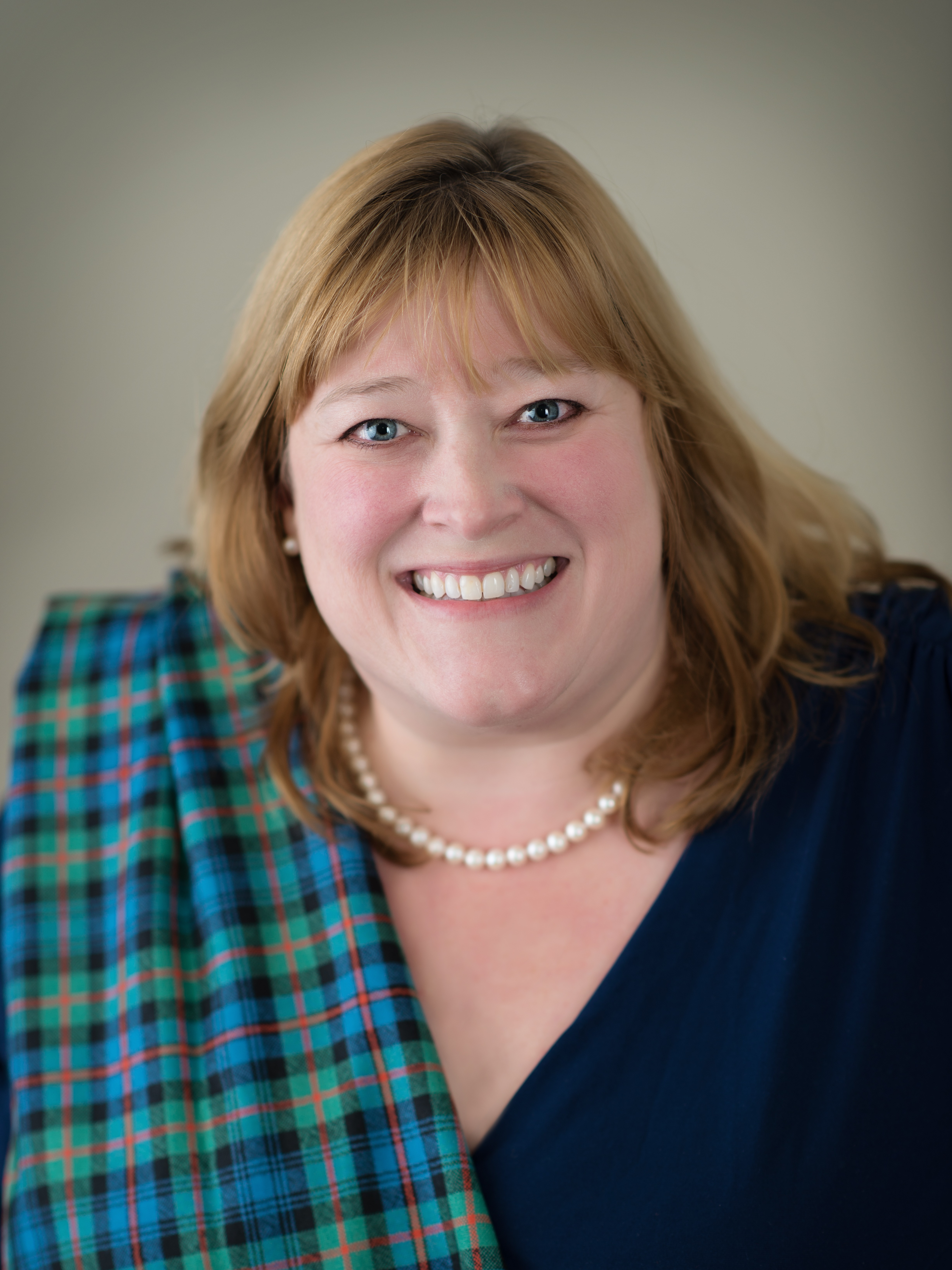
| | Majority party | Minority party |
|---|---|---|
| Leader | Ron Mariano | Bradley Jones Jr. |
| Party | Democratic | Republican |
| Leader since | December 30, 2020 | November 21, 2002 |
| Leader's seat | 3rd Norfolk | 20th Middlesex |
| Last election | 129 seats, 74.27% | 30 seats, 22.76% |
| Seats before | 130 | 29 |
| Seats after | 134 | 25 |
| Seat change | ▲4 | ▼4 |
| Popular vote | 1,507,301 | 541,222 |
| Percentage | 71.28% | 25.60% |
| Swing | ▼2.99% | ▲2.84% |
| | Third party |
| Leader | Susannah Whipps |
| Party | Independent |
| Leader's seat | 2nd Franklin |
| Last election | 1 seat, 1.87% |
| Seats before | 1 |
| Seats after | 1 |
| Seat change | Steady |
| Popular vote | 35,680 |
| Percentage | 1.69% |
| Swing | ▼0.18% |
- Democratic gain Republican gain Democratic hold Republican hold Independent hold 50–60% 60–70% 70–80% 80–90% >90% 50–60% 60–70% 70–80% 80–90% >90% 60–70%
Speaker before election
Ron Mariano
Democratic
Elected Speaker
Ron Mariano
Democratic

The 2022 Massachusetts House of Representatives election was held on Tuesday, November 8, 2022, with the primary election having been held on Tuesday, September 6, 2022. Massachusetts voters selected all 160 members of the State House to serve two-year terms in the 2023–2024 Massachusetts legislature. The election coincided with United States national elections and Massachusetts state elections, including U.S. House, Governor, and Massachusetts Senate.

Democrats gained four seats, increasing their supermajority to 134 out of 160 seats, the largest majority of any party since 2009. Simultaneously with gains in the state Senate, and Maura Healey's win in the gubernatorial race, Democrats won a trifecta in the state for the first time since 2014.

These were the first elections in Massachusetts following the 2020 United States redistricting cycle, which resulted in some members being assigned to new districts.

== 2021-2022 Special Elections ==
=== 2021 Special: 19th Suffolk ===
Primary Election Results
| Party | Candidate | Votes | % |
Democratic Party Primary Results
| Democratic | Jeffrey Rosario Turco | 1,706 | 36.21% |
| Democratic | Juan Pablo Jaramillo | 1,418 | 30.10% |
| Democratic | Alicia Cathryn Delvento | 1,226 | 26.02% |
| Democratic | Valentino Capobianco | 361 | 7.66% |
| Total votes | | 4,711 | 100.00% |
Republican Party Primary Results
| Republican | Paul A. Caruccio | 180 | 100.00% |
| Total votes | | 180 | 100.00% |

General Election Results
| Party | Candidate | Votes | % |
|---|---|---|---|
| Democratic | Jeffrey Rosario Turco | 1,866 | 66.50% |
| Independent | Richard A. Fucillo (Note: The candidate's party was officially listed as "Unenrolled" in Massachusetts election results.) | 474 | 16.89% |
| Republican | Paul A. Caruccio | 466 | 16.61% |
| Total votes | | 2,806 | 100.00% |
| Democratic hold | | | |

=== 2021 Special: 4th Essex ===
Primary Election Results
| Party | Candidate | Votes | % |
Democratic Party Primary Results
| Democratic | Jamie M. Belsito | 1,728 | 73.97% |
| Democratic | Darcyll C. Dale | 608 | 26.03% |
| Total votes | | 2,336 | 100.00% |
Republican Party Primary Results
| Republican | Robert L. Snow | 836 | 57.18% |
| Republican | Lisa-Marie C. Cashman | 626 | 42.82% |
| Total votes | | 1,462 | 100.00% |

General Election Results
| Party | Candidate | Votes | % |
|---|---|---|---|
| Democratic | Jamie M. Belsito | 2,504 | 55.39% |
| Republican | Robert L. Snow | 2,017 | 44.61% |
| Total votes | | 4,521 | 100.00% |
| Democratic gain from Republican | | | |

== Predictions ==
| Source | Ranking | As of |
|---|---|---|
| Sabato's Crystal Ball | Safe D | May 19, 2022 |

== Overview ==
=== Election ===
2022 Massachusetts House of Representatives election General election — November 8, 2022
| Party | Votes | Percentage | Seats | +/– |
|---|---|---|---|---|
| Democratic | 1,507,301 | 71.28 | 134 | ▲9 |
| Republican | 541,222 | 25.60 | 25 | ▼2 |
| Green-Rainbow | 2,865 | 0.14 | 0 | Steady |
| Workers Party | 3,945 | 0.19 | 0 | Steady |
| Independents | 35,680 | 1.69 | 1 | Steady |
| All Others | 22,462 | 1.06 | 0 | Steady |
| Write-In | 1,000 | 0.05 | 0 | Steady |
| Valid votes | 2,114,475 | 84.19 | — | — |
| Invalid votes | 397,113 | 15.81 | — | — |
| Totals | 2,511,588 | 100 | 160 | — |
| Registered voter/turnout | 4,884,076 | 51.42 | | |

Popular vote
| Democratic | 71.28% |
| Republican | 25.60% |
| Independent | 1.69% |
| Other | 1.43% |

Percentage seats won
| Democratic | 83.75% |
| Republican | 15.63% |
| Independent | 0.62% |

== Summary of results by State House district ==
Italics denote an open seat held by the incumbent party; bold text denotes a gain for a party.

| State House District | Incumbent | Party | Elected Representative | Party |
|---|---|---|---|---|
| 1st Barnstable | Tim Whelan | Rep | **Chris Flanagan** | **Dem** |
| 2nd Barnstable | Kip Diggs | Dem | Kip Diggs | Dem |
| 3rd Barnstable | David Vieira | Rep | David Vieira | Rep |
| 4th Barnstable | Sarah Peake | Dem | Sarah Peake | Dem |
| 5th Barnstable | Steven Xiarhos | Rep | Steven Xiarhos | Rep |
| Barnstable, Dukes and Nantucket | Dylan Fernandes | Dem | Dylan Fernandes | Dem |
| 1st Berkshire | John Barrett III | Dem | John Barrett III | Dem |
| 2nd Berkshire | Paul W. Mark | Dem | Tricia Farley-Bouvier (Note: Redistricted from 3rd Berkshire to 2nd Berkshire.) | Dem |
| 3rd Berkshire | Tricia Farley-Bouvier | Dem | William Pignatelli (Note: Redistricted from 4th Berkshire to 3rd Berkshire.) | Dem |
| 4th Berkshire | William Pignatelli | Dem | Obsolete District (Note: The new 19th Worcester district replaces the obsolete 4th Berkshire district.) | |
| 1st Bristol | F. Jay Barrows | Rep | F. Jay Barrows | Rep |
| 2nd Bristol | James Hawkins | Dem | James Hawkins | Dem |
| 3rd Bristol | Carol Doherty | Dem | Carol Doherty | Dem |
| 4th Bristol | Steven Howitt | Rep | Steven Howitt | Rep |
| 5th Bristol | Patricia Haddad | Dem | Patricia Haddad | Dem |
| 6th Bristol | Carole Fiola | Dem | Carole Fiola | Dem |
| 7th Bristol | Alan Silvia | Dem | Alan Silvia | Dem |
| 8th Bristol | Paul Schmid | Dem | Paul Schmid | Dem |
| 9th Bristol | Christopher Markey | Dem | Christopher Markey | Dem |
| 10th Bristol | William Straus | Dem | William Straus | Dem |
| 11th Bristol | Christopher Hendricks | Dem | Christopher Hendricks | Dem |
| 12th Bristol | Norman Orrall | Rep | Norman Orrall | Rep |
| 13th Bristol | Antonio Cabral | Dem | Antonio Cabral | Dem |
| 14th Bristol | Adam Scanlon | Dem | Adam Scanlon | Dem |
| 1st Essex | Vacant | | **Dawne Shand** | **Dem** |
| 2nd Essex | Leonard Mirra (Note: Previously Contested. Incumbent Leonard Mirra (R) was seated in January 2023 as a "hold-over" representative while a Special House Committee examined the vote returns for each candidate, which were certified in having Kristin Kassner (D) winning by 1 vote. The Special House Committee, in a 2-1 vote, decided in favor of Kristin Kassner.) | Rep | **Kristin Kassner** (Note: Representative Kassner assumed office on February 3, 2023.) | **Dem** |
| 3rd Essex | Andy Vargas | Dem | Andy Vargas | Dem |
| 4th Essex | Jamie Belsito | Dem | Estela Reyes | Dem |
| 5th Essex | Ann-Margaret Ferrante | Dem | Ann-Margaret Ferrante | Dem |
| 6th Essex | Jerry Parisella | Dem | Jerry Parisella | Dem |
| 7th Essex | Paul Tucker | Dem | Manny Cruz | Dem |
| 8th Essex | Vacant | | Jenny Armini | Dem |
| 9th Essex | Donald Wong | Rep | Donald Wong | Rep |
| 10th Essex | Daniel Cahill | Dem | Daniel Cahill | Dem |
| 11th Essex | Peter Capano | Dem | Peter Capano | Dem |
| 12th Essex | Thomas Walsh | Dem | Thomas Walsh | Dem |
| 13th Essex | Sally Kerans | Dem | Sally Kerans | Dem |
| 14th Essex | Christina Minicucci | Dem | Adrianne Ramos | Dem |
| 15th Essex | Linda Dean Campbell | Dem | Ryan Hamilton | Dem |
| 16th Essex | Marcos Devers | Dem | Francisco Paulino | Dem |
| 17th Essex | Frank A. Moran | Dem | Frank A. Moran | Dem |
| 18th Essex | Tram Nguyen | Dem | Tram Nguyen | Dem |
| 1st Franklin | Natalie Blais | Dem | Natalie Blais | Dem |
| 2nd Franklin | Susannah Whipps | Ind | Susannah Whipps | Ind |
| 1st Hampden | Todd Smola | Rep | Todd Smola | Rep |
| 2nd Hampden | Brian Michael Ashe | Dem | Brian Michael Ashe | Dem |
| 3rd Hampden | Nicholas Boldyga | Rep | Nicholas Boldyga | Rep |
| 4th Hampden | Kelly Pease | Rep | Kelly Pease | Rep |
| 5th Hampden | Patricia Duffy | Dem | Patricia Duffy | Dem |
| 6th Hampden | Michael Finn | Dem | Michael Finn | Dem |
| 7th Hampden | Jacob Oliveira | Dem | Aaron Saunders | Dem |
| 8th Hampden | Joseph Wagner | Dem | Shirley Arriaga | Dem |
| 9th Hampden | Orlando Ramos | Dem | Orlando Ramos | Dem |
| 10th Hampden | Carlos Gonzalez | Dem | Carlos Gonzalez | Dem |
| 11th Hampden | Bud Williams | Dem | Bud Williams | Dem |
| 12th Hampden | Angelo Puppolo | Dem | Angelo Puppolo | Dem |
| 1st Hampshire | Lindsay Sabadosa | Dem | Lindsay Sabadosa | Dem |
| 2nd Hampshire | Daniel Carey | Dem | Daniel Carey | Dem |
| 3rd Hampshire | Mindy Domb | Dem | Mindy Domb | Dem |
| 1st Middlesex | Vacant | | **Margaret Scarsdale (Note: Previously Contested. Vacant while a Special House Committee reviewed the vote returns for each candidate. The committee ruled in favor of Margaret Scarsdale (D). She assumed office on January 18, 2023.)** | **Dem** |
| 2nd Middlesex | James Arciero | Dem | James Arciero | Dem |
| 3rd Middlesex | Kate Hogan | Dem | Kate Hogan | Dem |
| 4th Middlesex | Danielle Gregoire | Dem | Danielle Gregoire | Dem |
| 5th Middlesex | David Linsky | Dem | David Linsky | Dem |
| 6th Middlesex | Vacant | | Priscila Sousa | Dem |
| 7th Middlesex | Jack Patrick Lewis | Dem | Jack Patrick Lewis | Dem |
| 8th Middlesex | Vacant | | James Arena-DeRosa | Dem |
| 9th Middlesex | Thomas Stanley | Dem | Thomas Stanley | Dem |
| 10th Middlesex | John Lawn | Dem | John Lawn | Dem |
| 11th Middlesex | Kay Khan | Dem | Kay Khan | Dem |
| 12th Middlesex | Ruth Balser | Dem | Ruth Balser | Dem |
| 13th Middlesex | Carmine Lawrence Gentile | Dem | Carmine Lawrence Gentile | Dem |
| 14th Middlesex | Tami Gouveia | Dem | Simon Cataldo | Dem |
| 15th Middlesex | Michelle Ciccolo | Dem | Michelle Ciccolo | Dem |
| 16th Middlesex | Vacant | | Rodney Elliott | Dem |
| 17th Middlesex | Vanna Howard | Dem | Vanna Howard | Dem |
| 18th Middlesex | Rady Mom | Dem | Rady Mom | Dem |
| 19th Middlesex | David Allen Robertson | Dem | David Allen Robertson | Dem |
| 20th Middlesex | Bradley Jones Jr. | Rep | Bradley Jones Jr. | Rep |
| 21st Middlesex | Kenneth Gordon | Dem | Kenneth Gordon | Dem |
| 22nd Middlesex | Marc Lombardo | Rep | Marc Lombardo | Rep |
| 23rd Middlesex | Sean Garballey | Dem | Sean Garballey | Dem |
| 24th Middlesex | David Rogers | Dem | David Rogers | Dem |
| 25th Middlesex | Marjorie Decker | Dem | Marjorie Decker | Dem |
| 26th Middlesex | Mike Connolly | Dem | Mike Connolly | Dem |
| 27th Middlesex | Erika Uyterhoeven | Dem | Erika Uyterhoeven | Dem |
| 28th Middlesex | Joe McGonagle | Dem | Joe McGonagle | Dem |
| 29th Middlesex | Steven Owens | Dem | Steven Owens | Dem |
| 30th Middlesex | Richard Haggerty | Dem | Richard Haggerty | Dem |
| 31st Middlesex | Michael Day | Dem | Michael Day | Dem |
| 32nd Middlesex | Kate Lipper-Garabedian | Dem | Kate Lipper-Garabedian | Dem |
| 33rd Middlesex | Steven Ultrino | Dem | Steven Ultrino | Dem |
| 34th Middlesex | Christine Barber | Dem | Christine Barber | Dem |
| 35th Middlesex | Paul Donato | Dem | Paul Donato | Dem |
| 36th Middlesex | Colleen Garry | Dem | Colleen Garry | Dem |
| 37th Middlesex | Danillo Sena | Dem | Danillo Sena | Dem |
| 1st Norfolk | Bruce Ayers | Dem | Bruce Ayers | Dem |
| 2nd Norfolk | Tackey Chan | Dem | Tackey Chan | Dem |
| 3rd Norfolk | Ron Mariano | Dem | Ron Mariano | Dem |
| 4th Norfolk | James Murphy | Dem | James Murphy | Dem |
| 5th Norfolk | Mark Cusack | Dem | Mark Cusack | Dem |
| 6th Norfolk | William Galvin | Dem | William Galvin | Dem |
| 7th Norfolk | William Driscoll | Dem | William Driscoll | Dem |
| 8th Norfolk | Ted Philips | Dem | Ted Philips | Dem |
| 9th Norfolk | Shawn Dooley | Rep | Marcus Vaughn | Rep |
| 10th Norfolk | Jeffrey Roy | Dem | Jeffrey Roy | Dem |
| 11th Norfolk | Paul McMurtry | Dem | Paul McMurtry | Dem |
| 12th Norfolk | John Rogers | Dem | John Rogers | Dem |
| 13th Norfolk | Denise Garlick | Dem | Denise Garlick | Dem |
| 14th Norfolk | Alice Peisch | Dem | Alice Peisch | Dem |
| 15th Norfolk | Tommy Vitolo | Dem | Tommy Vitolo | Dem |
| 1st Plymouth | Matthew Muratore | Rep | Matthew Muratore | Rep |
| 2nd Plymouth | Susan Gifford | Rep | Susan Gifford | Rep |
| 3rd Plymouth | Joan Meschino | Dem | Joan Meschino | Dem |
| 4th Plymouth | Patrick Joseph Kearney | Dem | Patrick Joseph Kearney | Dem |
| 5th Plymouth | David DeCoste | Rep | David DeCoste | Rep |
| 6th Plymouth | Josh Cutler | Dem | Josh Cutler | Dem |
| 7th Plymouth | Alyson Sullivan | Rep | Alyson Sullivan | Rep |
| 8th Plymouth | Angelo D'Emilia | Rep | Angelo D'Emilia | Rep |
| 9th Plymouth | Gerry Cassidy | Dem | Gerry Cassidy | Dem |
| 10th Plymouth | Michelle DuBois | Dem | Michelle DuBois | Dem |
| 11th Plymouth | Vacant | | Rita Mendes | Dem |
| 12th Plymouth | Kathleen LaNatra | Dem | Kathleen LaNatra | Dem |
| 1st Suffolk | Adrian Madaro | Dem | Adrian Madaro | Dem |
| 2nd Suffolk | Daniel Joseph Ryan | Dem | Daniel Joseph Ryan | Dem |
| 3rd Suffolk | Aaron Michlewitz | Dem | Aaron Michlewitz | Dem |
| 4th Suffolk | David Biele | Dem | David Biele | Dem |
| 5th Suffolk | Liz Miranda | Dem | Christopher Worrell | Dem |
| 6th Suffolk | Russell Holmes | Dem | Russell Holmes | Dem |
| 7th Suffolk | Chynah Tyler | Dem | Chynah Tyler | Dem |
| 8th Suffolk | Jay Livingstone | Dem | Jay Livingstone | Dem |
| 9th Suffolk | Jon Santiago | Dem | Jon Santiago | Dem |
| 10th Suffolk | Edward F. Coppinger | Dem | Edward F. Coppinger | Dem |
| 11th Suffolk | Liz Malia | Dem | Judith Garcia | Dem |
| 12th Suffolk | Brandy Fluker Oakley | Dem | Brandy Fluker Oakley | Dem |
| 13th Suffolk | Daniel J. Hunt | Dem | Daniel J. Hunt | Dem |
| 14th Suffolk | Rob Consalvo | Dem | Rob Consalvo | Dem |
| 15th Suffolk | Nika Elugardo | Dem | Sam Montaño | Dem |
| 16th Suffolk | Jessica Giannino | Dem | Jessica Giannino | Dem |
| 17th Suffolk | Kevin Honan | Dem | Kevin Honan | Dem |
| 18th Suffolk | Michael Moran | Dem | Michael Moran | Dem |
| 19th Suffolk | Jeffrey Turco | Dem | Jeffrey Turco | Dem |
| 1st Worcester | Kimberly Ferguson | Rep | Kimberly Ferguson | Rep |
| 2nd Worcester | Jonathan Zlotnik | Dem | Jonathan Zlotnik | Dem |
| 3rd Worcester | Michael Kushmerek | Dem | Michael Kushmerek | Dem |
| 4th Worcester | Natalie Higgins | Dem | Natalie Higgins | Dem |
| 5th Worcester | Donald Berthiaume | Rep | Donald Berthiaume | Rep |
| 6th Worcester | Peter Durant | Rep | Peter Durant | Rep |
| 7th Worcester | Paul Frost | Rep | Paul Frost | Rep |
| 8th Worcester | Michael Soter | Rep | Michael Soter | Rep |
| 9th Worcester | David Muradian | Rep | David Muradian | Rep |
| 10th Worcester | Brian Murray | Dem | Brian Murray | Dem |
| 11th Worcester | Hannah Kane | Rep | Hannah Kane | Rep |
| 12th Worcester | Meghan Kilcoyne | Dem | Meghan Kilcoyne | Dem |
| 13th Worcester | John J. Mahoney Jr. | Dem | John J. Mahoney Jr. | Dem |
| 14th Worcester | James O'Day | Dem | James O'Day | Dem |
| 15th Worcester | Mary Keefe | Dem | Mary Keefe | Dem |
| 16th Worcester | Daniel M. Donahue | Dem | Daniel M. Donahue | Dem |
| 17th Worcester | David LeBoeuf | Dem | David LeBoeuf | Dem |
| 18th Worcester | Joseph McKenna | Rep | Joseph McKenna | Rep |
| 19th Worcester | New District | | **Kate Donaghue** | **Dem** |

== Detailed Results ==
Sources for election results:

=== 1st Barnstable ===
Primary Election Results
| Party | Candidate | Votes | % |
Democratic Party Primary Results
| Democratic | Christopher Richard Flanagan | 6,294 | 100.00% |
| Total votes | | 6,294 | 100.00% |
Republican Party Primary Results
| Republican | Tracy A. Post | 3,755 | 100.00% |
| Total votes | | 3,755 | 100.00% |

General Election Results
| Party | Candidate | Votes | % |
|---|---|---|---|
| Democratic | Christopher Richard Flanagan | 12,454 | 53.47% |
| Republican | Tracy A. Post | 10,389 | 44.61% |
| Independent | Abraham Kasparian, Jr. | 447 | 1.92% |
| Total votes | | 23,290 | 100.00% |
| Democratic gain from Republican | | | |

=== 2nd Barnstable ===
Primary Election Results
| Party | Candidate | Votes | % |
Democratic Party Primary Results
| Democratic | Kip A. Diggs (incumbent) | 4,754 | 100.00% |
| Total votes | | 4,754 | 100.00% |
Republican Party Primary Results
| Republican | William Buffington Peters (Note: The candidate ran a write-in campaign in this election.) | 309 | 100.00% |
| Total votes | | 309 | 100.00% |

General Election Results
| Party | Candidate | Votes | % |
|---|---|---|---|
| Democratic | Kip A. Diggs (incumbent) | 11,664 | 62.17% |
| Republican | William Buffington Peters | 7,098 | 37.83% |
| Total votes | | 18,762 | 100.00% |
| Democratic hold | | | |

=== 3rd Barnstable ===
Primary Election Results
| Party | Candidate | Votes | % |
Democratic Party Primary Results
| Democratic | Kathleen Fox Alfano | 283 | 100.00% |
| Total votes | | 283 | 100.00% |
Republican Party Primary Results
| Republican | David T. Vieira (incumbent) | 3,420 | 100.00% |
| Total votes | | 3,420 | 100.00% |

General Election Results
| Party | Candidate | Votes | % |
|---|---|---|---|
| Republican | David T. Vieira (incumbent) | 12,715 | 55.42% |
| Democratic | Kathleen Fox Alfano | 10,227 | 44.58% |
| Total votes | | 22,942 | 100.00% |
| Republican hold | | | |

=== 4th Barnstable ===
Primary Election Results
| Party | Candidate | Votes | % |
Democratic Party Primary Results
| Democratic | Sarah K. Peake (incumbent) | 8,008 | 88.61% |
| Democratic | Jack Stanton | 1,029 | 11.39% |
| Total votes | | 9,037 | 100.00% |

General Election Results
| Party | Candidate | Votes | % |
|---|---|---|---|
| Democratic | Sarah K. Peake (incumbent) | 18,786 | 100.00% |
| Total votes | | 18,786 | 100.00% |
| Democratic hold | | | |

=== 5th Barnstable ===
Primary Election Results
| Party | Candidate | Votes | % |
Republican Party Primary Results
| Republican | Steven G. Xiarhos (incumbent) | 3,546 | 100.00% |
| Total votes | | 3,546 | 100.00% |

General Election Results
| Party | Candidate | Votes | % |
|---|---|---|---|
| Republican | Steven G. Xiarhos (incumbent) | 15,324 | 100.00% |
| Total votes | | 15,324 | 100.00% |
| Republican hold | | | |

=== Barnstable, Dukes and Nantucket ===
Primary Election Results
| Party | Candidate | Votes | % |
Democratic Party Primary Results
| Democratic | Dylan A. Fernandes (incumbent) | 6,179 | 100.00% |
| Total votes | | 6,179 | 100.00% |

General Election Results
| Party | Candidate | Votes | % |
|---|---|---|---|
| Democratic | Dylan A. Fernandes (incumbent) | 15,858 | 100.00% |
| Total votes | | 15,858 | 100.00% |
| Democratic hold | | | |

=== 1st Berkshire ===
Primary Election Results
| Party | Candidate | Votes | % |
Democratic Party Primary Results
| Democratic | John P. Barrett, III (incumbent) | 4,818 | 71.53% |
| Democratic | Paula R. Kingsbury-Evans | 1,918 | 28.47% |
| Total votes | | 6,736 | 100.00% |

General Election Results
| Party | Candidate | Votes | % |
|---|---|---|---|
| Democratic | John P. Barrett, III (incumbent) | 12,787 | 100.00% |
| Total votes | | 12,787 | 100.00% |
| Democratic hold | | | |

=== 2nd Berkshire ===
Primary Election Results
| Party | Candidate | Votes | % |
Democratic Party Primary Results
| Democratic | Tricia Farley-Bouvier (incumbent) | 6,588 | 100.00% |
| Total votes | | 6,588 | 100.00% |

General Election Results
| Party | Candidate | Votes | % |
|---|---|---|---|
| Democratic | Tricia Farley-Bouvier (incumbent) | 10,883 | 100.00% |
| Total votes | | 10,883 | 100.00% |
| Democratic hold | | | |

=== 3rd Berkshire ===
Primary Election Results
| Party | Candidate | Votes | % |
Democratic Party Primary Results
| Democratic | William "Smitty" Pignatelli (incumbent) | 7,971 | 100.00% |
| Total votes | | 7,971 | 100.00% |

General Election Results
| Party | Candidate | Votes | % |
|---|---|---|---|
| Democratic | William "Smitty" Pignatelli (incumbent) | 16,340 | 90.59% |
| Green-Rainbow | Michael Silvio Lavery | 1,698 | 9.41% |
| Total votes | | 18,038 | 100.00% |
| Democratic hold | | | |

=== 1st Bristol ===
Primary Election Results
| Party | Candidate | Votes | % |
Democratic Party Primary Results
| Democratic | Brendan A. Roche | 1,848 | 53.74% |
| Democratic | Peter M. Lally | 1,591 | 46.26% |
| Total votes | | 3,439 | 100.00% |
Republican Party Primary Results
| Republican | Fred Jay Barrows (incumbent) | 1,873 | 100.00% |
| Total votes | | 1,873 | 100.00% |

General Election Results
| Party | Candidate | Votes | % |
|---|---|---|---|
| Republican | Fred Jay Barrows (incumbent) | 9,680 | 57.57% |
| Democratic | Brendan A. Roche | 7,135 | 42.43% |
| Total votes | | 16,815 | 100.00% |
| Republican hold | | | |

=== 2nd Bristol ===
Primary Election Results
| Party | Candidate | Votes | % |
Democratic Party Primary Results
| Democratic | James K. Hawkins (incumbent) | 2,989 | 100.00% |
| Total votes | | 2,989 | 100.00% |
Republican Party Primary Results
| Republican | Steven Joseph Escobar | 1,293 | 100.00% |
| Total votes | | 1,293 | 100.00% |

General Election Results
| Party | Candidate | Votes | % |
|---|---|---|---|
| Democratic | James K. Hawkins (incumbent) | 8,468 | 60.55% |
| Republican | Steven Joseph Escobar | 5,516 | 39.45% |
| Total votes | | 13,984 | 100.00% |
| Democratic hold | | | |

=== 3rd Bristol ===
Primary Election Results
| Party | Candidate | Votes | % |
Democratic Party Primary Results
| Democratic | Carol A. Doherty (incumbent) | 2,996 | 100.00% |
| Total votes | | 2,996 | 100.00% |
Republican Party Primary Results
| Republican | Christopher P. Coute | 1,361 | 100.00% |
| Total votes | | 1,361 | 100.00% |

General Election Results
| Party | Candidate | Votes | % |
|---|---|---|---|
| Democratic | Carol A. Doherty (incumbent) | 8,011 | 57.03% |
| Republican | Christopher P. Coute | 6,036 | 42.97% |
| Total votes | | 14,047 | 100.00% |
| Democratic hold | | | |

=== 4th Bristol ===
Primary Election Results
| Party | Candidate | Votes | % |
Republican Party Primary Results
| Republican | Steven S. Howitt (incumbent) | 1,875 | 100.00% |
| Total votes | | 1,875 | 100.00% |

General Election Results
| Party | Candidate | Votes | % |
|---|---|---|---|
| Republican | Steven S. Howitt (incumbent) | 13,380 | 100.00% |
| Total votes | | 13,380 | 100.00% |
| Republican hold | | | |

=== 5th Bristol ===
Primary Election Results
| Party | Candidate | Votes | % |
Democratic Party Primary Results
| Democratic | Patricia A. Haddad (incumbent) | 3,866 | 100.00% |
| Total votes | | 3,866 | 100.00% |
Republican Party Primary Results
| Republican | Justin Thurber | 285 | 100.00% |
| Total votes | | 285 | 100.00% |

General Election Results
| Party | Candidate | Votes | % |
|---|---|---|---|
| Democratic | Patricia A. Haddad (incumbent) | 8,951 | 54.36% |
| Republican | Justin Thurber | 7,514 | 45.64% |
| Total votes | | 16,465 | 100.00% |
| Democratic hold | | | |

=== 6th Bristol ===
Primary Election Results
| Party | Candidate | Votes | % |
Democratic Party Primary Results
| Democratic | Carole A. Fiola (incumbent) | 2,801 | 100.00% |
| Total votes | | 2,801 | 100.00% |
Republican Party Primary Results
| Republican | Marco A. Valdivia (Note: The candidate did not advance from the primary to the general election.) | 3 | 100.00% |
| Total votes | | 3 | 100.00% |

General Election Results
| Party | Candidate | Votes | % |
|---|---|---|---|
| Democratic | Carole A. Fiola (incumbent) | 7,321 | 100.00% |
| Total votes | | 7,321 | 100.00% |
| Democratic hold | | | |

=== 7th Bristol ===
Primary Election Results
| Party | Candidate | Votes | % |
Democratic Party Primary Results
| Democratic | Alan Silvia (incumbent) | 1,660 | 100.00% |
| Total votes | | 1,660 | 100.00% |
Republican Party Primary Results
| Republican | Angel Luis Pantoja, Jr | 19 | 100.00% |
| Total votes | | 19 | 100.00% |

General Election Results
| Party | Candidate | Votes | % |
|---|---|---|---|
| Democratic | Alan Silvia (incumbent) | 4,886 | 100.00% |
| Total votes | | 4,886 | 100.00% |
| Democratic hold | | | |

=== 8th Bristol ===
Primary Election Results
| Party | Candidate | Votes | % |
Democratic Party Primary Results
| Democratic | Paul Schmid, III (incumbent) | 3,390 | 100.00% |
| Total votes | | 3,390 | 100.00% |
Republican Party Primary Results
| Republican | Evan Gendreau | 1,674 | 100.00% |
| Total votes | | 1,674 | 100.00% |

General Election Results
| Party | Candidate | Votes | % |
|---|---|---|---|
| Democratic | Paul Schmid, III (incumbent) | 8,437 | 53.52% |
| Republican | Evan Gendreau | 7,326 | 46.48% |
| Total votes | | 15,763 | 100.00% |
| Democratic hold | | | |

=== 9th Bristol ===
Primary Election Results
| Party | Candidate | Votes | % |
Democratic Party Primary Results
| Democratic | Christopher M. Markey (incumbent) | 3,624 | 73.85% |
| Democratic | Cameron Scott Costa | 1,283 | 26.15% |
| Total votes | | 4,907 | 100.00% |

General Election Results
| Party | Candidate | Votes | % |
|---|---|---|---|
| Democratic | Christopher M. Markey (incumbent) | 10,977 | 100.00% |
| Total votes | | 10,977 | 100.00% |
| Democratic hold | | | |

=== 10th Bristol ===
Primary Election Results
| Party | Candidate | Votes | % |
Democratic Party Primary Results
| Democratic | William M. Straus (incumbent) | 4,454 | 78.92% |
| Democratic | Richard F. Trapilo | 1,190 | 21.08% |
| Total votes | | 5,644 | 100.00% |
Republican Party Primary Results
| Republican | Jeffrey Gerald Swift | 1,622 | 53.76% |
| Republican | Robert S. McConnell | 1,395 | 46.24% |
| Total votes | | 3,017 | 100.00% |

General Election Results
| Party | Candidate | Votes | % |
|---|---|---|---|
| Democratic | William M. Straus (incumbent) | 10,648 | 56.26% |
| Republican | Jeffrey Gerald Swift | 8,280 | 43.74% |
| Total votes | | 18,928 | 100.00% |
| Democratic hold | | | |

=== 11th Bristol ===
Primary Election Results
| Party | Candidate | Votes | % |
Democratic Party Primary Results
| Democratic | Christopher Hendricks (incumbent) | 1,565 | 100.00% |
| Total votes | | 1,565 | 100.00% |

General Election Results
| Party | Candidate | Votes | % |
|---|---|---|---|
| Democratic | Christopher Hendricks (incumbent) | 4,906 | 100.00% |
| Total votes | | 4,906 | 100.00% |
| Democratic hold | | | |

=== 12th Bristol ===
Primary Election Results
| Party | Candidate | Votes | % |
Democratic Party Primary Results
| Democratic | David A. French, III | 75 | 100.00% |
| Total votes | | 75 | 100.00% |
Republican Party Primary Results
| Republican | Norman J. Orrall (incumbent) | 2,009 | 100.00% |
| Total votes | | 2,009 | 100.00% |

General Election Results
| Party | Candidate | Votes | % |
|---|---|---|---|
| Republican | Norman J. Orrall (incumbent) | 12,370 | 100.00% |
| Total votes | | 12,370 | 100.00% |
| Republican hold | | | |

=== 13th Bristol ===
Primary Election Results
| Party | Candidate | Votes | % |
Democratic Party Primary Results
| Democratic | Antonio d. F. Cabral (incumbent) | 2,663 | 100.00% |
| Total votes | | 2,663 | 100.00% |

General Election Results
| Party | Candidate | Votes | % |
|---|---|---|---|
| Democratic | Antonio d. F. Cabral (incumbent) | 6,977 | 100.00% |
| Total votes | | 6,977 | 100.00% |
| Democratic hold | | | |

=== 14th Bristol ===
Primary Election Results
| Party | Candidate | Votes | % |
Democratic Party Primary Results
| Democratic | Adam J. Scanlon (incumbent) | 3,013 | 100.00% |
| Total votes | | 3,013 | 100.00% |
Republican Party Primary Results
| Republican | William Edward Ross Hymon | 110 | 78.01% |
| Republican | Patrick Westaway McCue | 31 | 21.99% |
| Total votes | | 141 | 100.00% |

General Election Results
| Party | Candidate | Votes | % |
|---|---|---|---|
| Democratic | Adam J. Scanlon (incumbent) | 11,212 | 100.00% |
| Total votes | | 11,212 | 100.00% |
| Democratic hold | | | |

=== 1st Essex ===
Primary Election Results
| Party | Candidate | Votes | % |
Democratic Party Primary Results
| Democratic | Dawne F. Shand | 1,442 | 76.30% |
| Democratic | Byron J. Lane | 448 | 23.70% |
| Total votes | | 1,890 | 100.00% |
Republican Party Primary Results
| Republican | James M. Kelcourse (incumbent) (Note: Kelcourse's name remained on the ballot, even though he had decided to withdraw from the race. The Massachusetts GOP selected Charles "CJ" Fitzwater to replace Kelcourse as the Republican nominee for the district on the general election ballot.) | 1,598 | 74.36% |
| Republican | Charles Fitzwater | 441 | 20.52% |
| Republican | Samson Racioppi | 110 | 5.12% |
| Total votes | | 2,149 | 100.00% |

General Election Results
| Party | Candidate | Votes | % |
|---|---|---|---|
| Democratic | Dawne F. Shand | 12,790 | 59.64% |
| Republican | Cj Fitzwater | 8,657 | 40.36% |
| Total votes | | 21,447 | 100.00% |
| Democratic gain from Republican | | | |

=== 2nd Essex ===
Primary Election Results
| Party | Candidate | Votes | % |
Democratic Party Primary Results
| Democratic | Kristin E. Kassner | 5,048 | 100.00% |
| Total votes | | 5,048 | 100.00% |
Republican Party Primary Results
| Republican | Leonard Mirra (incumbent) | 2,656 | 100.00% |
| Total votes | | 2,656 | 100.00% |

General Election Results
| Party | Candidate | Votes | % |
|---|---|---|---|
| Democratic | Kristin E. Kassner | 11,763 | 50.002% |
| Republican | Leonard Mirra (incumbent) | 11,762 | 49.998% |
| Total votes | | 23,525 | 100.00% |
| Democratic gain from Republican | | | |

=== 3rd Essex ===
Primary Election Results
| Party | Candidate | Votes | % |
Democratic Party Primary Results
| Democratic | Andres X. Vargas (incumbent) | 3,249 | 100.00% |
| Total votes | | 3,249 | 100.00% |

General Election Results
| Party | Candidate | Votes | % |
|---|---|---|---|
| Democratic | Andres X. Vargas (incumbent) | 9,176 | 100.00% |
| Total votes | | 9,176 | 100.00% |
| Democratic hold | | | |

=== 4th Essex ===
Primary Election Results
| Party | Candidate | Votes | % |
Democratic Party Primary Results
| Democratic | Estela A. Reyes | 1,555 | 50.95% |
| Democratic | James McCarty | 1,160 | 38.01% |
| Democratic | William Lantigua | 337 | 11.04% |
| Total votes | | 3,052 | 100.00% |

General Election Results
| Party | Candidate | Votes | % |
|---|---|---|---|
| Democratic | Estela A. Reyes | 4,884 | 100.00% |
| Total votes | | 4,884 | 100.00% |
| Democratic hold | | | |

=== 5th Essex ===
Primary Election Results
| Party | Candidate | Votes | % |
Democratic Party Primary Results
| Democratic | Ann-Margaret Ferrante (incumbent) | 5,258 | 72.50% |
| Democratic | D. Nathaniel Mulcahy | 1,994 | 27.50% |
| Total votes | | 7,252 | 100.00% |
Republican Party Primary Results
| Republican | Ashley Sullivan | 185 | 100.00% |
| Total votes | | 185 | 100.00% |

General Election Results
| Party | Candidate | Votes | % |
|---|---|---|---|
| Democratic | Ann-Margaret Ferrante (incumbent) | 14,971 | 69.14% |
| Republican | Ashley Sullivan | 6,683 | 30.86% |
| Total votes | | 21,654 | 100.00% |
| Democratic hold | | | |

=== 6th Essex ===
Primary Election Results
| Party | Candidate | Votes | % |
Democratic Party Primary Results
| Democratic | Jerald A. Parisella (incumbent) | 5,429 | 100.00% |
| Total votes | | 5,429 | 100.00% |
Republican Party Primary Results
| Republican | Ty Vitale | 60 | 100.00% |
| Total votes | | 60 | 100.00% |

General Election Results
| Party | Candidate | Votes | % |
|---|---|---|---|
| Democratic | Jerald A. Parisella (incumbent) | 14,666 | 100.00% |
| Total votes | | 14,666 | 100.00% |
| Democratic hold | | | |

=== 7th Essex ===
Primary Election Results
| Party | Candidate | Votes | % |
Democratic Party Primary Results
| Democratic | Manny Cruz | 4,818 | 59.95% |
| Democratic | Domingo J. Dominguez | 2,557 | 31.82% |
| Democratic | Gene Collins | 662 | 8.24% |
| Total votes | | 8,037 | 100.00% |

General Election Results
| Party | Candidate | Votes | % |
|---|---|---|---|
| Democratic | Manny Cruz | 13,608 | 100.00% |
| Total votes | | 13,608 | 100.00% |
| Democratic hold | | | |

=== 8th Essex ===
Primary Election Results
| Party | Candidate | Votes | % |
Democratic Party Primary Results
| Democratic | Jennifer Wb Armini | 2,316 | 27.63% |
| Democratic | Tristan Smith | 2,007 | 23.95% |
| Democratic | Douglas Thompson | 1,552 | 18.52% |
| Democratic | Polly Titcomb | 972 | 11.60% |
| Democratic | Theresa M. Tauro | 966 | 11.53% |
| Democratic | Diann Mary Slavit Baylis | 568 | 6.78% |
| Total votes | | 8,381 | 100.00% |

General Election Results
| Party | Candidate | Votes | % |
|---|---|---|---|
| Democratic | Jennifer Wb Armini | 14,156 | 100.00% |
| Total votes | | 14,156 | 100.00% |
| Democratic hold | | | |

=== 9th Essex ===
Primary Election Results
| Party | Candidate | Votes | % |
Republican Party Primary Results
| Republican | Donald H. Wong (incumbent) | 2,183 | 100.00% |
| Total votes | | 2,183 | 100.00% |

General Election Results
| Party | Candidate | Votes | % |
|---|---|---|---|
| Republican | Donald H. Wong (incumbent) | 13,664 | 100.00% |
| Total votes | | 13,664 | 100.00% |
| Republican hold | | | |

=== 10th Essex ===
Primary Election Results
| Party | Candidate | Votes | % |
Democratic Party Primary Results
| Democratic | Daniel H. Cahill (incumbent) | 2,227 | 100.00% |
| Total votes | | 2,227 | 100.00% |

General Election Results
| Party | Candidate | Votes | % |
|---|---|---|---|
| Democratic | Daniel H. Cahill (incumbent) | 6,042 | 100.00% |
| Total votes | | 6,042 | 100.00% |
| Democratic hold | | | |

=== 11th Essex ===
Primary Election Results
| Party | Candidate | Votes | % |
Democratic Party Primary Results
| Democratic | Peter L. Capano (incumbent) | 2,665 | 100.00% |
| Total votes | | 2,665 | 100.00% |

General Election Results
| Party | Candidate | Votes | % |
|---|---|---|---|
| Democratic | Peter L. Capano (incumbent) | 7,135 | 100.00% |
| Total votes | | 7,135 | 100.00% |
| Democratic hold | | | |

=== 12th Essex ===
Primary Election Results
| Party | Candidate | Votes | % |
Democratic Party Primary Results
| Democratic | Thomas P. Walsh (incumbent) | 4,463 | 100.00% |
| Total votes | | 4,463 | 100.00% |

General Election Results
| Party | Candidate | Votes | % |
|---|---|---|---|
| Democratic | Thomas P. Walsh (incumbent) | 12,021 | 100.00% |
| Total votes | | 12,021 | 100.00% |
| Democratic hold | | | |

=== 13th Essex ===
Primary Election Results
| Party | Candidate | Votes | % |
Democratic Party Primary Results
| Democratic | Sally P. Kerans (incumbent) | 5,010 | 100.00% |
| Total votes | | 5,010 | 100.00% |
Republican Party Primary Results
| Republican | Michael D. Bean | 157 | 100.00% |
| Total votes | | 157 | 100.00% |

General Election Results
| Party | Candidate | Votes | % |
|---|---|---|---|
| Democratic | Sally P. Kerans (incumbent) | 13,923 | 96.06% |
| Republican | Michael D. Bean | 571 | 3.94% |
| Total votes | | 14,494 | 100.00% |
| Democratic hold | | | |

=== 14th Essex ===
Primary Election Results
| Party | Candidate | Votes | % |
Democratic Party Primary Results
| Democratic | Adrianne Ramos | 4,565 | 100.00% |
| Total votes | | 4,565 | 100.00% |
Republican Party Primary Results
| Republican | Joseph G. Finn | 2,298 | 100.00% |
| Total votes | | 2,298 | 100.00% |

General Election Results
| Party | Candidate | Votes | % |
|---|---|---|---|
| Democratic | Adrianne Ramos | 10,879 | 54.29% |
| Republican | Joseph G. Finn | 9,161 | 45.71% |
| Total votes | | 20,040 | 100.00% |
| Democratic hold | | | |

=== 15th Essex ===
Primary Election Results
| Party | Candidate | Votes | % |
Democratic Party Primary Results
| Democratic | Ryan M. Hamilton | 3,679 | 100.00% |
| Total votes | | 3,679 | 100.00% |

General Election Results
| Party | Candidate | Votes | % |
|---|---|---|---|
| Democratic | Ryan M. Hamilton | 10,822 | 100.00% |
| Total votes | | 10,822 | 100.00% |
| Democratic hold | | | |

=== 16th Essex ===
Primary Election Results
| Party | Candidate | Votes | % |
Democratic Party Primary Results
| Democratic | Francisco E. Paulino | 1,511 | 52.81% |
| Democratic | Marcos A. Devers (incumbent) | 1,350 | 47.19% |
| Total votes | | 2,861 | 100.00% |

General Election Results
| Party | Candidate | Votes | % |
|---|---|---|---|
| Democratic | Francisco E. Paulino | 5,363 | 100.00% |
| Total votes | | 5,363 | 100.00% |
| Democratic hold | | | |

=== 17th Essex ===
Primary Election Results
| Party | Candidate | Votes | % |
Democratic Party Primary Results
| Democratic | Frank A. Moran (incumbent) | 2,484 | 100.00% |
| Total votes | | 2,484 | 100.00% |

General Election Results
| Party | Candidate | Votes | % |
|---|---|---|---|
| Democratic | Frank A. Moran (incumbent) | 6,031 | 100.00% |
| Total votes | | 6,031 | 100.00% |
| Democratic hold | | | |

=== 18th Essex ===
Primary Election Results
| Party | Candidate | Votes | % |
Democratic Party Primary Results
| Democratic | Tram T. Nguyen (incumbent) | 4,324 | 100.00% |
| Total votes | | 4,324 | 100.00% |
Republican Party Primary Results
| Republican | Jeffrey Peter Dufour | 1,899 | 100.00% |
| Total votes | | 1,899 | 100.00% |

General Election Results
| Party | Candidate | Votes | % |
|---|---|---|---|
| Democratic | Tram T. Nguyen (incumbent) | 11,812 | 60.42% |
| Republican | Jeffrey Peter Dufour | 7,738 | 39.58% |
| Total votes | | 19,550 | 100.00% |
| Democratic hold | | | |

=== 1st Franklin ===
Primary Election Results
| Party | Candidate | Votes | % |
Democratic Party Primary Results
| Democratic | Natalie M. Blais (incumbent) | 6,167 | 100.00% |
| Total votes | | 6,167 | 100.00% |

General Election Results
| Party | Candidate | Votes | % |
|---|---|---|---|
| Democratic | Natalie M. Blais (incumbent) | 16,086 | 100.00% |
| Total votes | | 16,086 | 100.00% |
| Democratic hold | | | |

=== 2nd Franklin ===
Primary Election Results
| Party | Candidate | Votes | % |
Republican Party Primary Results
| Republican | Jeffrey L. Raymond | 1,522 | 100.00% |
| Total votes | | 1,522 | 100.00% |

General Election Results
| Party | Candidate | Votes | % |
|---|---|---|---|
| Independent | Susannah M. Whipps (incumbent) | 9,797 | 63.51% |
| Republican | Jeffrey L. Raymond | 4,892 | 31.71% |
| Independent | Kevin Patrick McKeown | 736 | 4.77% |
| Total votes | | 15,425 | 100.00% |
| Independent hold | | | |

=== 1st Hampden ===
Primary Election Results
| Party | Candidate | Votes | % |
Republican Party Primary Results
| Republican | Todd M. Smola (incumbent) | 2,103 | 100.00% |
| Total votes | | 2,103 | 100.00% |

General Election Results
| Party | Candidate | Votes | % |
|---|---|---|---|
| Republican | Todd M. Smola (incumbent) | 13,297 | 100.00% |
| Total votes | | 13,297 | 100.00% |
| Republican hold | | | |

=== 2nd Hampden ===
Primary Election Results
| Party | Candidate | Votes | % |
Democratic Party Primary Results
| Democratic | Brian M. Ashe (incumbent) | 4,983 | 100.00% |
| Total votes | | 4,983 | 100.00% |

General Election Results
| Party | Candidate | Votes | % |
|---|---|---|---|
| Democratic | Brian M. Ashe (incumbent) | 13,670 | 100.00% |
| Total votes | | 13,670 | 100.00% |
| Democratic hold | | | |

=== 3rd Hampden ===
Primary Election Results
| Party | Candidate | Votes | % |
Democratic Party Primary Results
| Democratic | Anthony J. Russo | 3,228 | 100.00% |
| Total votes | | 3,228 | 100.00% |
Republican Party Primary Results
| Republican | Nicholas A. Boldyga (incumbent) | 2,491 | 100.00% |
| Total votes | | 2,491 | 100.00% |

General Election Results
| Party | Candidate | Votes | % |
|---|---|---|---|
| Republican | Nicholas A. Boldyga (incumbent) | 11,093 | 59.99% |
| Democratic | Anthony J. Russo | 7,397 | 40.01% |
| Total votes | | 18,490 | 100.00% |
| Republican hold | | | |

=== 4th Hampden ===
Primary Election Results
| Party | Candidate | Votes | % |
Republican Party Primary Results
| Republican | Kelly W. Pease (incumbent) | 1,995 | 100.00% |
| Total votes | | 1,995 | 100.00% |

General Election Results
| Party | Candidate | Votes | % |
|---|---|---|---|
| Republican | Kelly W. Pease (incumbent) | 12,256 | 100.00% |
| Total votes | | 12,256 | 100.00% |
| Republican hold | | | |

=== 5th Hampden ===
Primary Election Results
| Party | Candidate | Votes | % |
Democratic Party Primary Results
| Democratic | Patricia A. Duffy (incumbent) | 3,143 | 100.00% |
| Total votes | | 3,143 | 100.00% |

General Election Results
| Party | Candidate | Votes | % |
|---|---|---|---|
| Democratic | Patricia A. Duffy (incumbent) | 7,990 | 100.00% |
| Total votes | | 7,990 | 100.00% |
| Democratic hold | | | |

=== 6th Hampden ===
Primary Election Results
| Party | Candidate | Votes | % |
Democratic Party Primary Results
| Democratic | Michael J. Finn (incumbent) | 2,706 | 100.00% |
| Total votes | | 2,706 | 100.00% |

General Election Results
| Party | Candidate | Votes | % |
|---|---|---|---|
| Democratic | Michael J. Finn (incumbent) | 9,055 | 100.00% |
| Total votes | | 9,055 | 100.00% |
| Democratic hold | | | |

=== 7th Hampden ===
Primary Election Results
| Party | Candidate | Votes | % |
Democratic Party Primary Results
| Democratic | Aaron L. Saunders | 4,895 | 100.00% |
| Total votes | | 4,895 | 100.00% |
Republican Party Primary Results
| Republican | James Chip Harrington | 1,741 | 100.00% |
| Total votes | | 1,741 | 100.00% |

General Election Results
| Party | Candidate | Votes | % |
|---|---|---|---|
| Democratic | Aaron L. Saunders | 9,577 | 52.77% |
| Republican | James Chip Harrington | 8,573 | 47.23% |
| Total votes | | 18,150 | 100.00% |
| Democratic hold | | | |

=== 8th Hampden ===
Primary Election Results
| Party | Candidate | Votes | % |
Democratic Party Primary Results
| Democratic | Shirley B. Arriaga | 3,061 | 63.74% |
| Democratic | Joel David McAuliffe | 1,741 | 36.26% |
| Total votes | | 4,802 | 100.00% |

General Election Results
| Party | Candidate | Votes | % |
|---|---|---|---|
| Democratic | Shirley B. Arriaga | 8,129 | 64.78% |
| Independent | Sean Goonan | 4,420 | 35.22% |
| Total votes | | 12,549 | 100.00% |
| Democratic hold | | | |

=== 9th Hampden ===
Primary Election Results
| Party | Candidate | Votes | % |
Democratic Party Primary Results
| Democratic | Orlando Ramos (incumbent) | 2,053 | 100.00% |
| Total votes | | 2,053 | 100.00% |

General Election Results
| Party | Candidate | Votes | % |
|---|---|---|---|
| Democratic | Orlando Ramos (incumbent) | 5,913 | 100.00% |
| Total votes | | 5,913 | 100.00% |
| Democratic hold | | | |

=== 10th Hampden ===
Primary Election Results
| Party | Candidate | Votes | % |
Democratic Party Primary Results
| Democratic | Carlos González (incumbent) | 1,757 | 100.00% |
| Total votes | | 1,757 | 100.00% |

General Election Results
| Party | Candidate | Votes | % |
|---|---|---|---|
| Democratic | Carlos González (incumbent) | 4,069 | 100.00% |
| Total votes | | 4,069 | 100.00% |
| Democratic hold | | | |

=== 11th Hampden ===
Primary Election Results
| Party | Candidate | Votes | % |
Democratic Party Primary Results
| Democratic | Bud L. Williams (incumbent) | 1,798 | 63.92% |
| Democratic | Jynai McDonald | 1,015 | 36.08% |
| Total votes | | 2,813 | 100.00% |

General Election Results
| Party | Candidate | Votes | % |
|---|---|---|---|
| Democratic | Bud L. Williams (incumbent) | 6,165 | 100.00% |
| Total votes | | 6,165 | 100.00% |
| Democratic hold | | | |

=== 12th Hampden ===
Primary Election Results
| Party | Candidate | Votes | % |
Democratic Party Primary Results
| Democratic | Angelo J. Puppolo, Jr. (incumbent) | 4,419 | 100.00% |
| Total votes | | 4,419 | 100.00% |

General Election Results
| Party | Candidate | Votes | % |
|---|---|---|---|
| Democratic | Angelo J. Puppolo, Jr. (incumbent) | 12,882 | 100.00% |
| Total votes | | 12,882 | 100.00% |
| Democratic hold | | | |

=== 1st Hampshire ===
Primary Election Results
| Party | Candidate | Votes | % |
Democratic Party Primary Results
| Democratic | Lindsay N. Sabadosa (incumbent) | 8,140 | 100.00% |
| Total votes | | 8,140 | 100.00% |

General Election Results
| Party | Candidate | Votes | % |
|---|---|---|---|
| Democratic | Lindsay N. Sabadosa (incumbent) | 17,592 | 100.00% |
| Total votes | | 17,592 | 100.00% |
| Democratic hold | | | |

=== 2nd Hampshire ===
Primary Election Results
| Party | Candidate | Votes | % |
Democratic Party Primary Results
| Democratic | Daniel R. Carey (incumbent) | 6,001 | 100.00% |
| Total votes | | 6,001 | 100.00% |

General Election Results
| Party | Candidate | Votes | % |
|---|---|---|---|
| Democratic | Daniel R. Carey (incumbent) | 15,492 | 100.00% |
| Total votes | | 15,492 | 100.00% |
| Democratic hold | | | |

=== 3rd Hampshire ===
Primary Election Results
| Party | Candidate | Votes | % |
Democratic Party Primary Results
| Democratic | Mindy Domb (incumbent) | 3,729 | 100.00% |
| Total votes | | 3,729 | 100.00% |

General Election Results
| Party | Candidate | Votes | % |
|---|---|---|---|
| Democratic | Mindy Domb (incumbent) | 8,333 | 100.00% |
| Total votes | | 8,333 | 100.00% |
| Democratic hold | | | |

=== 1st Middlesex ===
Primary Election Results
| Party | Candidate | Votes | % |
Democratic Party Primary Results
| Democratic | Margaret R. Scarsdale | 4,082 | 100.00% |
| Total votes | | 4,082 | 100.00% |
Republican Party Primary Results
| Republican | Andrew James Shepherd | 2,261 | 50.89% |
| Republican | Lynne E. Archambault | 2,182 | 49.11% |
| Total votes | | 4,443 | 100.00% |

General Election Results
| Party | Candidate | Votes | % |
|---|---|---|---|
| Democratic | Margaret R. Scarsdale | 9,409 | 47.31% |
| Republican | Andrew James Shepherd | 9,402 | 47.28% |
| Independent | Catherine Lundeen | 1,075 | 5.41% |
| Total votes | | 19,886 | 100.00% |
| Democratic gain from Republican | | | |

=== 2nd Middlesex ===
Primary Election Results
| Party | Candidate | Votes | % |
Democratic Party Primary Results
| Democratic | James Arciero (incumbent) | 4,632 | 100.00% |
| Total votes | | 4,632 | 100.00% |
Republican Party Primary Results
| Republican | Raymond Yinggang Xie | 1,942 | 100.00% |
| Total votes | | 1,942 | 100.00% |

General Election Results
| Party | Candidate | Votes | % |
|---|---|---|---|
| Democratic | James Arciero (incumbent) | 12,792 | 64.86% |
| Republican | Raymond Yinggang Xie | 6,931 | 35.14% |
| Total votes | | 19,723 | 100.00% |
| Democratic hold | | | |

=== 3rd Middlesex ===
Primary Election Results
| Party | Candidate | Votes | % |
Democratic Party Primary Results
| Democratic | Kate Hogan (incumbent) | 5,635 | 100.00% |
| Total votes | | 5,635 | 100.00% |

General Election Results
| Party | Candidate | Votes | % |
|---|---|---|---|
| Democratic | Kate Hogan (incumbent) | 15,844 | 100.00% |
| Total votes | | 15,844 | 100.00% |
| Democratic hold | | | |

=== 4th Middlesex ===
Primary Election Results
| Party | Candidate | Votes | % |
Democratic Party Primary Results
| Democratic | Danielle W. Gregoire (incumbent) | 3,212 | 100.00% |
| Total votes | | 3,212 | 100.00% |

General Election Results
| Party | Candidate | Votes | % |
|---|---|---|---|
| Democratic | Danielle W. Gregoire (incumbent) | 10,157 | 100.00% |
| Total votes | | 10,157 | 100.00% |
| Democratic hold | | | |

=== 5th Middlesex ===
Primary Election Results
| Party | Candidate | Votes | % |
Democratic Party Primary Results
| Democratic | David Paul Linsky (incumbent) | 4,903 | 100.00% |
| Total votes | | 4,903 | 100.00% |

General Election Results
| Party | Candidate | Votes | % |
|---|---|---|---|
| Democratic | David Paul Linsky (incumbent) | 15,019 | 100.00% |
| Total votes | | 15,019 | 100.00% |
| Democratic hold | | | |

=== 6th Middlesex ===
Primary Election Results
| Party | Candidate | Votes | % |
Democratic Party Primary Results
| Democratic | Priscila S. Sousa | 1,689 | 51.97% |
| Democratic | Margareth B. Shepard | 1,428 | 43.94% |
| Democratic | Dhruba Prasad Sen | 133 | 4.09% |
| Total votes | | 3,250 | 100.00% |

General Election Results
| Party | Candidate | Votes | % |
|---|---|---|---|
| Democratic | Priscila S. Sousa | 6,839 | 100.00% |
| Total votes | | 6,839 | 100.00% |
| Democratic hold | | | |

=== 7th Middlesex ===
Primary Election Results
| Party | Candidate | Votes | % |
Democratic Party Primary Results
| Democratic | Jack Patrick Lewis (incumbent) | 4,947 | 100.00% |
| Total votes | | 4,947 | 100.00% |

General Election Results
| Party | Candidate | Votes | % |
|---|---|---|---|
| Democratic | Jack Patrick Lewis (incumbent) | 13,362 | 100.00% |
| Total votes | | 13,362 | 100.00% |
| Democratic hold | | | |

=== 8th Middlesex ===
Primary Election Results
| Party | Candidate | Votes | % |
Democratic Party Primary Results
| Democratic | James Arena-DeRosa | 3,070 | 57.10% |
| Democratic | Connor B. Degan | 2,307 | 42.90% |
| Total votes | | 5,377 | 100.00% |
Republican Party Primary Results
| Republican | Loring Barnes | 1,524 | 100.00% |
| Total votes | | 1,524 | 100.00% |

General Election Results
| Party | Candidate | Votes | % |
|---|---|---|---|
| Democratic | James Arena-DeRosa | 12,916 | 65.03% |
| Republican | Loring Barnes | 6,947 | 34.97% |
| Total votes | | 19,863 | 100.00% |
| Democratic hold | | | |

=== 9th Middlesex ===
Primary Election Results
| Party | Candidate | Votes | % |
Democratic Party Primary Results
| Democratic | Thomas M. Stanley (incumbent) | 2,643 | 53.01% |
| Democratic | Heather A. May | 2,343 | 46.99% |
| Total votes | | 4,986 | 100.00% |

General Election Results
| Party | Candidate | Votes | % |
|---|---|---|---|
| Democratic | Thomas M. Stanley (incumbent) | 11,372 | 100.00% |
| Total votes | | 11,372 | 100.00% |
| Democratic hold | | | |

=== 10th Middlesex ===
Primary Election Results
| Party | Candidate | Votes | % |
Democratic Party Primary Results
| Democratic | John J. Lawn, Jr. (incumbent) | 3,321 | 100.00% |
| Total votes | | 3,321 | 100.00% |

General Election Results
| Party | Candidate | Votes | % |
|---|---|---|---|
| Democratic | John J. Lawn, Jr. (incumbent) | 9,979 | 100.00% |
| Total votes | | 9,979 | 100.00% |
| Democratic hold | | | |

=== 11th Middlesex ===
Primary Election Results
| Party | Candidate | Votes | % |
Democratic Party Primary Results
| Democratic | Kay S. Khan (incumbent) | 5,638 | 100.00% |
| Total votes | | 5,638 | 100.00% |

General Election Results
| Party | Candidate | Votes | % |
|---|---|---|---|
| Democratic | Kay S. Khan (incumbent) | 13,394 | 100.00% |
| Total votes | | 13,394 | 100.00% |
| Democratic hold | | | |

=== 12th Middlesex ===
Primary Election Results
| Party | Candidate | Votes | % |
Democratic Party Primary Results
| Democratic | Ruth B. Balser (incumbent) | 6,265 | 100.00% |
| Total votes | | 6,265 | 100.00% |

General Election Results
| Party | Candidate | Votes | % |
|---|---|---|---|
| Democratic | Ruth B. Balser (incumbent) | 15,164 | 100.00% |
| Total votes | | 15,164 | 100.00% |
| Democratic hold | | | |

=== 13th Middlesex ===
Primary Election Results
| Party | Candidate | Votes | % |
Democratic Party Primary Results
| Democratic | Carmine Lawrence Gentile (incumbent) | 5,665 | 100.00% |
| Total votes | | 5,665 | 100.00% |

General Election Results
| Party | Candidate | Votes | % |
|---|---|---|---|
| Democratic | Carmine Lawrence Gentile (incumbent) | 16,338 | 100.00% |
| Total votes | | 16,338 | 100.00% |
| Democratic hold | | | |

=== 14th Middlesex ===
Primary Election Results
| Party | Candidate | Votes | % |
Democratic Party Primary Results
| Democratic | Simon Cataldo | 4,611 | 57.19% |
| Democratic | Vivian Birchall | 2,254 | 27.95% |
| Democratic | Patricia Wojtas | 1,198 | 14.86% |
| Total votes | | 8,063 | 100.00% |
Republican Party Primary Results
| Republican | Rodney E. Cleaves | 1,414 | 100.00% |
| Total votes | | 1,414 | 100.00% |

General Election Results
| Party | Candidate | Votes | % |
|---|---|---|---|
| Democratic | Simon Cataldo | 14,542 | 72.92% |
| Republican | Rodney E. Cleaves | 5,400 | 27.08% |
| Total votes | | 19,942 | 100.00% |
| Democratic hold | | | |

=== 15th Middlesex ===
Primary Election Results
| Party | Candidate | Votes | % |
Democratic Party Primary Results
| Democratic | Michelle Ciccolo (incumbent) | 5,572 | 100.00% |
| Total votes | | 5,572 | 100.00% |

General Election Results
| Party | Candidate | Votes | % |
|---|---|---|---|
| Democratic | Michelle Ciccolo (incumbent) | 14,123 | 100.00% |
| Total votes | | 14,123 | 100.00% |
| Democratic hold | | | |

=== 16th Middlesex ===
Primary Election Results
| Party | Candidate | Votes | % |
Democratic Party Primary Results
| Democratic | Rodney M. Elliott | 1,881 | 51.35% |
| Democratic | Zoe F. Dzineku | 1,782 | 48.65% |
| Total votes | | 3,663 | 100.00% |
Republican Party Primary Results
| Republican | Karla Jean Miller | 1,060 | 100.00% |
| Total votes | | 1,060 | 100.00% |

General Election Results
| Party | Candidate | Votes | % |
|---|---|---|---|
| Democratic | Rodney M. Elliott | 7,270 | 65.45% |
| Republican | Karla Jean Miller | 3,838 | 34.55% |
| Total votes | | 11,108 | 100.00% |
| Democratic hold | | | |

=== 17th Middlesex ===
Primary Election Results
| Party | Candidate | Votes | % |
Democratic Party Primary Results
| Democratic | Vanna Howard (incumbent) | 2,548 | 100.00% |
| Total votes | | 2,548 | 100.00% |

General Election Results
| Party | Candidate | Votes | % |
|---|---|---|---|
| Democratic | Vanna Howard (incumbent) | 7,168 | 100.00% |
| Total votes | | 7,168 | 100.00% |
| Democratic hold | | | |

=== 18th Middlesex ===
Primary Election Results
| Party | Candidate | Votes | % |
Democratic Party Primary Results
| Democratic | Rady Mom (incumbent) | 1,030 | 43.64% |
| Democratic | Tara Thorn Hong | 974 | 41.27% |
| Democratic | Dominik Hok Lay | 356 | 15.08% |
| Total votes | | 2,360 | 100.00% |

General Election Results
| Party | Candidate | Votes | % |
|---|---|---|---|
| Democratic | Rady Mom (incumbent) | 4,434 | 100.00% |
| Total votes | | 4,434 | 100.00% |
| Democratic hold | | | |

=== 19th Middlesex ===
Primary Election Results
| Party | Candidate | Votes | % |
Democratic Party Primary Results
| Democratic | David A. Robertson (incumbent) | 3,690 | 100.00% |
| Total votes | | 3,690 | 100.00% |
Republican Party Primary Results
| Republican | Paul Sarnowski | 2,159 | 100.00% |
| Total votes | | 2,159 | 100.00% |

General Election Results
| Party | Candidate | Votes | % |
|---|---|---|---|
| Democratic | David A. Robertson (incumbent) | 10,248 | 56.30% |
| Republican | Paul Sarnowski | 7,955 | 43.70% |
| Total votes | | 18,203 | 100.00% |
| Democratic hold | | | |

=== 20th Middlesex ===
Primary Election Results
| Party | Candidate | Votes | % |
Republican Party Primary Results
| Republican | Bradley H. Jones, Jr (incumbent) | 2,445 | 100.00% |
| Total votes | | 2,445 | 100.00% |

General Election Results
| Party | Candidate | Votes | % |
|---|---|---|---|
| Republican | Bradley H. Jones, Jr (incumbent) | 16,194 | 100.00% |
| Total votes | | 16,194 | 100.00% |
| Republican hold | | | |

=== 21st Middlesex ===
Primary Election Results
| Party | Candidate | Votes | % |
Democratic Party Primary Results
| Democratic | Kenneth I. Gordon (incumbent) | 3,915 | 65.13% |
| Democratic | Timothy P. Sullivan | 2,096 | 34.87% |
| Total votes | | 6,011 | 100.00% |

General Election Results
| Party | Candidate | Votes | % |
|---|---|---|---|
| Democratic | Kenneth I. Gordon (incumbent) | 13,510 | 100.00% |
| Total votes | | 13,510 | 100.00% |
| Democratic hold | | | |

=== 22nd Middlesex ===
Primary Election Results
| Party | Candidate | Votes | % |
Democratic Party Primary Results
| Democratic | Teresa Nicole English | 3,428 | 100.00% |
| Total votes | | 3,428 | 100.00% |
Republican Party Primary Results
| Republican | Marc T. Lombardo (incumbent) | 2,295 | 100.00% |
| Total votes | | 2,295 | 100.00% |

General Election Results
| Party | Candidate | Votes | % |
|---|---|---|---|
| Republican | Marc T. Lombardo (incumbent) | 9,224 | 54.35% |
| Democratic | Teresa Nicole English | 7,747 | 45.65% |
| Total votes | | 16,971 | 100.00% |
| Republican hold | | | |

=== 23rd Middlesex ===
Primary Election Results
| Party | Candidate | Votes | % |
Democratic Party Primary Results
| Democratic | Sean Garballey (incumbent) | 7,227 | 100.00% |
| Total votes | | 7,227 | 100.00% |

General Election Results
| Party | Candidate | Votes | % |
|---|---|---|---|
| Democratic | Sean Garballey (incumbent) | 16,822 | 100.00% |
| Total votes | | 16,822 | 100.00% |
| Democratic hold | | | |

=== 24th Middlesex ===
Primary Election Results
| Party | Candidate | Votes | % |
Democratic Party Primary Results
| Democratic | David M. Rogers (incumbent) | 6,615 | 100.00% |
| Total votes | | 6,615 | 100.00% |

General Election Results
| Party | Candidate | Votes | % |
|---|---|---|---|
| Democratic | David M. Rogers (incumbent) | 16,233 | 100.00% |
| Total votes | | 16,233 | 100.00% |
| Democratic hold | | | |

=== 25th Middlesex ===
Primary Election Results
| Party | Candidate | Votes | % |
Democratic Party Primary Results
| Democratic | Marjorie C. Decker (incumbent) | 4,687 | 100.00% |
| Total votes | | 4,687 | 100.00% |

General Election Results
| Party | Candidate | Votes | % |
|---|---|---|---|
| Democratic | Marjorie C. Decker (incumbent) | 11,018 | 100.00% |
| Total votes | | 11,018 | 100.00% |
| Democratic hold | | | |

=== 26th Middlesex ===
Primary Election Results
| Party | Candidate | Votes | % |
Democratic Party Primary Results
| Democratic | Mike Connolly (incumbent) | 4,624 | 100.00% |
| Total votes | | 4,624 | 100.00% |

General Election Results
| Party | Candidate | Votes | % |
|---|---|---|---|
| Democratic | Mike Connolly (incumbent) | 11,714 | 100.00% |
| Total votes | | 11,714 | 100.00% |
| Democratic hold | | | |

=== 27th Middlesex ===
Primary Election Results
| Party | Candidate | Votes | % |
Democratic Party Primary Results
| Democratic | Erika Uyterhoeven (incumbent) | 6,715 | 86.59% |
| Democratic | Jason Daniel Mackey | 1,040 | 13.41% |
| Total votes | | 7,755 | 100.00% |

General Election Results
| Party | Candidate | Votes | % |
|---|---|---|---|
| Democratic | Erika Uyterhoeven (incumbent) | 15,698 | 100.00% |
| Total votes | | 15,698 | 100.00% |
| Democratic hold | | | |

=== 28th Middlesex ===
Primary Election Results
| Party | Candidate | Votes | % |
Democratic Party Primary Results
| Democratic | Joseph W. McGonagle, Jr (incumbent) | 1,661 | 61.77% |
| Democratic | Guerline Alcy | 1,028 | 38.23% |
| Total votes | | 2,689 | 100.00% |

General Election Results
| Party | Candidate | Votes | % |
|---|---|---|---|
| Democratic | Joseph W. McGonagle, Jr (incumbent) | 4,713 | 70.81% |
| Independent | Michael K. Marchese | 1,943 | 29.19% |
| Total votes | | 6,656 | 100.00% |
| Democratic hold | | | |

=== 29th Middlesex ===
Primary Election Results
| Party | Candidate | Votes | % |
Democratic Party Primary Results
| Democratic | Steven C. Owens (incumbent) | 6,159 | 100.00% |
| Total votes | | 6,159 | 100.00% |

General Election Results
| Party | Candidate | Votes | % |
|---|---|---|---|
| Democratic | Steven C. Owens (incumbent) | 14,817 | 100.00% |
| Total votes | | 14,817 | 100.00% |
| Democratic hold | | | |

=== 30th Middlesex ===
Primary Election Results
| Party | Candidate | Votes | % |
Democratic Party Primary Results
| Democratic | Richard M. Haggerty (incumbent) | 4,264 | 100.00% |
| Total votes | | 4,264 | 100.00% |

General Election Results
| Party | Candidate | Votes | % |
|---|---|---|---|
| Democratic | Richard M. Haggerty (incumbent) | 13,027 | 100.00% |
| Total votes | | 13,027 | 100.00% |
| Democratic hold | | | |

=== 31st Middlesex ===
Primary Election Results
| Party | Candidate | Votes | % |
Democratic Party Primary Results
| Democratic | Michael Seamus Day (incumbent) | 4,496 | 100.00% |
| Total votes | | 4,496 | 100.00% |

General Election Results
| Party | Candidate | Votes | % |
|---|---|---|---|
| Democratic | Michael Seamus Day (incumbent) | 12,527 | 71.15% |
| Independent | Theodore Christos Menounos | 5,079 | 28.85% |
| Total votes | | 17,606 | 100.00% |
| Democratic hold | | | |

=== 32nd Middlesex ===
Primary Election Results
| Party | Candidate | Votes | % |
Democratic Party Primary Results
| Democratic | Kate Lipper-Garabedian (incumbent) | 5,879 | 100.00% |
| Total votes | | 5,879 | 100.00% |

General Election Results
| Party | Candidate | Votes | % |
|---|---|---|---|
| Democratic | Kate Lipper-Garabedian (incumbent) | 14,673 | 100.00% |
| Total votes | | 14,673 | 100.00% |
| Democratic hold | | | |

=== 33rd Middlesex ===
Primary Election Results
| Party | Candidate | Votes | % |
Democratic Party Primary Results
| Democratic | Steven Ultrino (incumbent) | 2,782 | 100.00% |
| Total votes | | 2,782 | 100.00% |

General Election Results
| Party | Candidate | Votes | % |
|---|---|---|---|
| Democratic | Steven Ultrino (incumbent) | 7,817 | 100.00% |
| Total votes | | 7,817 | 100.00% |
| Democratic hold | | | |

=== 34th Middlesex ===
Primary Election Results
| Party | Candidate | Votes | % |
Democratic Party Primary Results
| Democratic | Christine P. Barber (incumbent) | 4,337 | 100.00% |
| Total votes | | 4,337 | 100.00% |

General Election Results
| Party | Candidate | Votes | % |
|---|---|---|---|
| Democratic | Christine P. Barber (incumbent) | 11,675 | 100.00% |
| Total votes | | 11,675 | 100.00% |
| Democratic hold | | | |

=== 35th Middlesex ===
Primary Election Results
| Party | Candidate | Votes | % |
Democratic Party Primary Results
| Democratic | Paul J. Donato, Sr. (incumbent) | 3,036 | 50.42% |
| Democratic | Nichole Dawn Mossalam | 2,986 | 49.58% |
| Total votes | | 6,022 | 100.00% |

General Election Results
| Party | Candidate | Votes | % |
|---|---|---|---|
| Democratic | Paul J. Donato, Sr. (incumbent) | 10,474 | 100.00% |
| Total votes | | 10,474 | 100.00% |
| Democratic hold | | | |

=== 36th Middlesex ===
Primary Election Results
| Party | Candidate | Votes | % |
Democratic Party Primary Results
| Democratic | Colleen M. Garry (incumbent) | 3,308 | 100.00% |
| Total votes | | 3,308 | 100.00% |
Republican Party Primary Results
| Republican | George Derek Boag | 1,941 | 100.00% |
| Total votes | | 1,941 | 100.00% |

General Election Results
| Party | Candidate | Votes | % |
|---|---|---|---|
| Democratic | Colleen M. Garry (incumbent) | 10,025 | 60.64% |
| Republican | George Derek Boag | 6,506 | 39.36% |
| Total votes | | 16,531 | 100.00% |
| Democratic hold | | | |

=== 37th Middlesex ===
Primary Election Results
| Party | Candidate | Votes | % |
Democratic Party Primary Results
| Democratic | Danillo A. Sena (incumbent) | 5,132 | 100.00% |
| Total votes | | 5,132 | 100.00% |

General Election Results
| Party | Candidate | Votes | % |
|---|---|---|---|
| Democratic | Danillo A. Sena (incumbent) | 14,330 | 100.00% |
| Total votes | | 14,330 | 100.00% |
| Democratic hold | | | |

=== 1st Norfolk ===
Primary Election Results
| Party | Candidate | Votes | % |
Democratic Party Primary Results
| Democratic | Bruce J. Ayers (incumbent) | 3,378 | 78.47% |
| Democratic | Casey A. Dooley | 927 | 21.53% |
| Total votes | | 4,305 | 100.00% |

General Election Results
| Party | Candidate | Votes | % |
|---|---|---|---|
| Democratic | Bruce J. Ayers (incumbent) | 11,027 | 100.00% |
| Total votes | | 11,027 | 100.00% |
| Democratic hold | | | |

=== 2nd Norfolk ===
Primary Election Results
| Party | Candidate | Votes | % |
Democratic Party Primary Results
| Democratic | Tackey Chan (incumbent) | 3,956 | 100.00% |
| Total votes | | 3,956 | 100.00% |
Republican Party Primary Results
| Republican | Sharon Marie Cintolo | 1,006 | 100.00% |
| Total votes | | 1,006 | 100.00% |

General Election Results
| Party | Candidate | Votes | % |
|---|---|---|---|
| Democratic | Tackey Chan (incumbent) | 9,888 | 70.59% |
| Republican | Sharon Marie Cintolo | 4,119 | 29.41% |
| Total votes | | 14,007 | 100.00% |
| Democratic hold | | | |

=== 3rd Norfolk ===
Primary Election Results
| Party | Candidate | Votes | % |
Democratic Party Primary Results
| Democratic | Ronald Mariano (incumbent) | 3,113 | 100.00% |
| Total votes | | 3,113 | 100.00% |
Republican Party Primary Results
| Republican | Stephen F. Tougas | 37 | 100.00% |
| Total votes | | 37 | 100.00% |

General Election Results
| Party | Candidate | Votes | % |
|---|---|---|---|
| Democratic | Ronald Mariano (incumbent) | 10,085 | 100.00% |
| Total votes | | 10,085 | 100.00% |
| Democratic hold | | | |

=== 4th Norfolk ===
Primary Election Results
| Party | Candidate | Votes | % |
Democratic Party Primary Results
| Democratic | James Michael Murphy (incumbent) | 3,759 | 100.00% |
| Total votes | | 3,759 | 100.00% |
Republican Party Primary Results
| Republican | Paul J. Rotondo | 2,035 | 100.00% |
| Total votes | | 2,035 | 100.00% |

General Election Results
| Party | Candidate | Votes | % |
|---|---|---|---|
| Democratic | James Michael Murphy (incumbent) | 10,255 | 63.96% |
| Republican | Paul J. Rotondo | 5,778 | 36.04% |
| Total votes | | 16,033 | 100.00% |
| Democratic hold | | | |

=== 5th Norfolk ===
Primary Election Results
| Party | Candidate | Votes | % |
Democratic Party Primary Results
| Democratic | Mark J. Cusack (incumbent) | 3,537 | 100.00% |
| Total votes | | 3,537 | 100.00% |

General Election Results
| Party | Candidate | Votes | % |
|---|---|---|---|
| Democratic | Mark J. Cusack (incumbent) | 11,309 | 100.00% |
| Total votes | | 11,309 | 100.00% |
| Democratic hold | | | |

=== 6th Norfolk ===
Primary Election Results
| Party | Candidate | Votes | % |
Democratic Party Primary Results
| Democratic | William C. Galvin (incumbent) | 3,034 | 61.96% |
| Democratic | Tamisha L. Civil | 1,863 | 38.04% |
| Total votes | | 4,897 | 100.00% |

General Election Results
| Party | Candidate | Votes | % |
|---|---|---|---|
| Democratic | William C. Galvin (incumbent) | 12,778 | 100.00% |
| Total votes | | 12,778 | 100.00% |
| Democratic hold | | | |

=== 7th Norfolk ===
Primary Election Results
| Party | Candidate | Votes | % |
Democratic Party Primary Results
| Democratic | William J. Driscoll, Jr (incumbent) | 4,626 | 100.00% |
| Total votes | | 4,626 | 100.00% |

General Election Results
| Party | Candidate | Votes | % |
|---|---|---|---|
| Democratic | William J. Driscoll, Jr (incumbent) | 12,322 | 100.00% |
| Total votes | | 12,322 | 100.00% |
| Democratic hold | | | |

=== 8th Norfolk ===
Primary Election Results
| Party | Candidate | Votes | % |
Democratic Party Primary Results
| Democratic | Ted Philips (incumbent) | 4,451 | 100.00% |
| Total votes | | 4,451 | 100.00% |
Republican Party Primary Results
| Republican | Howard L. Terban | 1,211 | 100.00% |
| Total votes | | 1,211 | 100.00% |

General Election Results
| Party | Candidate | Votes | % |
|---|---|---|---|
| Democratic | Ted Philips (incumbent) | 12,257 | 69.42% |
| Republican | Howard L. Terban | 5,400 | 30.58% |
| Total votes | | 17,657 | 100.00% |
| Democratic hold | | | |

=== 9th Norfolk ===
Primary Election Results
| Party | Candidate | Votes | % |
Democratic Party Primary Results
| Democratic | Kevin Kalkut | 2,329 | 51.30% |
| Democratic | Stephen Patrick Teehan | 2,211 | 48.70% |
| Total votes | | 4,540 | 100.00% |
Republican Party Primary Results
| Republican | Marcus S. Vaughn | 2,558 | 100.00% |
| Total votes | | 2,558 | 100.00% |

General Election Results
| Party | Candidate | Votes | % |
|---|---|---|---|
| Republican | Marcus S. Vaughn | 10,534 | 50.87% |
| Democratic | Kevin Kalkut | 10,174 | 49.13% |
| Total votes | | 20,708 | 100.00% |
| Republican hold | | | |

=== 10th Norfolk ===
Primary Election Results
| Party | Candidate | Votes | % |
Democratic Party Primary Results
| Democratic | Jeffrey N. Roy (incumbent) | 4,124 | 100.00% |
| Total votes | | 4,124 | 100.00% |
Republican Party Primary Results
| Republican | Charles F. Bailey, III | 156 | 100.00% |
| Total votes | | 156 | 100.00% |

General Election Results
| Party | Candidate | Votes | % |
|---|---|---|---|
| Democratic | Jeffrey N. Roy (incumbent) | 12,045 | 63.74% |
| Republican | Charles F. Bailey, III | 6,852 | 36.26% |
| Total votes | | 18,897 | 100.00% |
| Democratic hold | | | |

=== 11th Norfolk ===
Primary Election Results
| Party | Candidate | Votes | % |
Democratic Party Primary Results
| Democratic | Paul McMurtry (incumbent) | 4,576 | 100.00% |
| Total votes | | 4,576 | 100.00% |

General Election Results
| Party | Candidate | Votes | % |
|---|---|---|---|
| Democratic | Paul McMurtry (incumbent) | 14,495 | 100.00% |
| Total votes | | 14,495 | 100.00% |
| Democratic hold | | | |

=== 12th Norfolk ===
Primary Election Results
| Party | Candidate | Votes | % |
Democratic Party Primary Results
| Democratic | John H. Rogers (incumbent) | 3,815 | 100.00% |
| Total votes | | 3,815 | 100.00% |

General Election Results
| Party | Candidate | Votes | % |
|---|---|---|---|
| Democratic | John H. Rogers (incumbent) | 12,798 | 100.00% |
| Total votes | | 12,798 | 100.00% |
| Democratic hold | | | |

=== 13th Norfolk ===
Primary Election Results
| Party | Candidate | Votes | % |
Democratic Party Primary Results
| Democratic | Denise C. Garlick (incumbent) | 5,852 | 100.00% |
| Total votes | | 5,852 | 100.00% |

General Election Results
| Party | Candidate | Votes | % |
|---|---|---|---|
| Democratic | Denise C. Garlick (incumbent) | 17,056 | 100.00% |
| Total votes | | 17,056 | 100.00% |
| Democratic hold | | | |

=== 14th Norfolk ===
Primary Election Results
| Party | Candidate | Votes | % |
Democratic Party Primary Results
| Democratic | Alice Hanlon Peisch (incumbent) | 4,635 | 100.00% |
| Total votes | | 4,635 | 100.00% |

General Election Results
| Party | Candidate | Votes | % |
|---|---|---|---|
| Democratic | Alice Hanlon Peisch (incumbent) | 14,057 | 92.33% |
| Green-Rainbow | David Rolde | 1,167 | 7.67% |
| Total votes | | 15,224 | 100.00% |
| Democratic hold | | | |

=== 15th Norfolk ===
Primary Election Results
| Party | Candidate | Votes | % |
Democratic Party Primary Results
| Democratic | Tommy Vitolo (incumbent) | 4,796 | 62.73% |
| Democratic | Raul Fernandez | 2,850 | 37.27% |
| Total votes | | 7,646 | 100.00% |

General Election Results
| Party | Candidate | Votes | % |
|---|---|---|---|
| Democratic | Tommy Vitolo (incumbent) | 12,906 | 100.00% |
| Total votes | | 12,906 | 100.00% |
| Democratic hold | | | |

=== 1st Plymouth ===
Primary Election Results
| Party | Candidate | Votes | % |
Democratic Party Primary Results
| Democratic | Stephen Michael Palmer | 2,687 | 54.13% |
| Democratic | Arthur Thomas Desloges | 2,277 | 45.87% |
| Total votes | | 4,964 | 100.00% |
Republican Party Primary Results
| Republican | Mathew J. Muratore (incumbent) | 3,088 | 100.00% |
| Total votes | | 3,088 | 100.00% |

General Election Results
| Party | Candidate | Votes | % |
|---|---|---|---|
| Republican | Mathew J. Muratore (incumbent) | 12,470 | 57.76% |
| Democratic | Stephen Michael Palmer | 9,121 | 42.24% |
| Total votes | | 21,591 | 100.00% |
| Republican hold | | | |

=== 2nd Plymouth ===
Primary Election Results
| Party | Candidate | Votes | % |
Republican Party Primary Results
| Republican | Susan Williams Gifford (incumbent) | 2,174 | 100.00% |
| Total votes | | 2,174 | 100.00% |

General Election Results
| Party | Candidate | Votes | % |
|---|---|---|---|
| Republican | Susan Williams Gifford (incumbent) | 13,019 | 100.00% |
| Total votes | | 13,019 | 100.00% |
| Republican hold | | | |

=== 3rd Plymouth ===
Primary Election Results
| Party | Candidate | Votes | % |
Democratic Party Primary Results
| Democratic | Joan Meschino (incumbent) | 5,111 | 100.00% |
| Total votes | | 5,111 | 100.00% |

General Election Results
| Party | Candidate | Votes | % |
|---|---|---|---|
| Democratic | Joan Meschino (incumbent) | 15,999 | 100.00% |
| Total votes | | 15,999 | 100.00% |
| Democratic hold | | | |

=== 4th Plymouth ===
Primary Election Results
| Party | Candidate | Votes | % |
Democratic Party Primary Results
| Democratic | Patrick Joseph Kearney (incumbent) | 4,866 | 100.00% |
| Total votes | | 4,866 | 100.00% |

General Election Results
| Party | Candidate | Votes | % |
|---|---|---|---|
| Democratic | Patrick Joseph Kearney (incumbent) | 17,384 | 100.00% |
| Total votes | | 17,384 | 100.00% |
| Democratic hold | | | |

=== 5th Plymouth ===
Primary Election Results
| Party | Candidate | Votes | % |
Democratic Party Primary Results
| Democratic | Emmanuel J. Dockter | 3,659 | 100.00% |
| Total votes | | 3,659 | 100.00% |
Republican Party Primary Results
| Republican | David F. DeCoste (incumbent) | 2,903 | 100.00% |
| Total votes | | 2,903 | 100.00% |

General Election Results
| Party | Candidate | Votes | % |
|---|---|---|---|
| Republican | David F. DeCoste (incumbent) | 10,039 | 51.74% |
| Democratic | Emmanuel J. Dockter | 9,363 | 48.26% |
| Total votes | | 19,402 | 100.00% |
| Republican hold | | | |

=== 6th Plymouth ===
Primary Election Results
| Party | Candidate | Votes | % |
Democratic Party Primary Results
| Democratic | Josh S. Cutler (incumbent) | 4,011 | 100.00% |
| Total votes | | 4,011 | 100.00% |
Republican Party Primary Results
| Republican | Kenneth Sweezey | 3,069 | 100.00% |
| Total votes | | 3,069 | 100.00% |

General Election Results
| Party | Candidate | Votes | % |
|---|---|---|---|
| Democratic | Josh S. Cutler (incumbent) | 12,163 | 56.14% |
| Republican | Kenneth Sweezey | 9,503 | 43.86% |
| Total votes | | 21,666 | 100.00% |
| Democratic hold | | | |

=== 7th Plymouth ===
Primary Election Results
| Party | Candidate | Votes | % |
Republican Party Primary Results
| Republican | Alyson M. Sullivan (incumbent) | 2,748 | 100.00% |
| Total votes | | 2,748 | 100.00% |

General Election Results
| Party | Candidate | Votes | % |
|---|---|---|---|
| Republican | Alyson M. Sullivan (incumbent) | 12,083 | 75.39% |
| Workers Party | Brandon J. Griffin | 3,945 | 24.61% |
| Total votes | | 16,028 | 100.00% |
| Republican hold | | | |

=== 8th Plymouth ===
Primary Election Results
| Party | Candidate | Votes | % |
Democratic Party Primary Results
| Democratic | Eric J. Haikola | 2,585 | 100.00% |
| Total votes | | 2,585 | 100.00% |
Republican Party Primary Results
| Republican | Angelo L. D'Emilia (incumbent) | 2,001 | 100.00% |
| Total votes | | 2,001 | 100.00% |

General Election Results
| Party | Candidate | Votes | % |
|---|---|---|---|
| Republican | Angelo L. D'Emilia (incumbent) | 9,449 | 60.00% |
| Democratic | Eric J. Haikola | 6,299 | 40.00% |
| Total votes | | 15,748 | 100.00% |
| Republican hold | | | |

=== 9th Plymouth ===
Primary Election Results
| Party | Candidate | Votes | % |
Democratic Party Primary Results
| Democratic | Gerard J. Cassidy (incumbent) | 3,541 | 100.00% |
| Total votes | | 3,541 | 100.00% |
Republican Party Primary Results
| Republican | Lawrence P. Novak | 1,605 | 100.00% |
| Total votes | | 1,605 | 100.00% |

General Election Results
| Party | Candidate | Votes | % |
|---|---|---|---|
| Democratic | Gerard J. Cassidy (incumbent) | 9,357 | 60.65% |
| Republican | Lawrence P. Novak | 6,072 | 39.35% |
| Total votes | | 15,429 | 100.00% |
| Democratic hold | | | |

=== 10th Plymouth ===
Primary Election Results
| Party | Candidate | Votes | % |
Democratic Party Primary Results
| Democratic | Michelle M. DuBois (incumbent) | 2,462 | 100.00% |
| Total votes | | 2,462 | 100.00% |

General Election Results
| Party | Candidate | Votes | % |
|---|---|---|---|
| Democratic | Michelle M. DuBois (incumbent) | 7,031 | 100.00% |
| Total votes | | 7,031 | 100.00% |
| Democratic hold | | | |

=== 11th Plymouth ===
Primary Election Results
| Party | Candidate | Votes | % |
Democratic Party Primary Results
| Democratic | Rita A. Mendes | 1,733 | 67.91% |
| Democratic | Shirley Rita Asack | 695 | 27.23% |
| Democratic | Fred Fontaine | 124 | 4.86% |
| Total votes | | 2,552 | 100.00% |

General Election Results
| Party | Candidate | Votes | % |
|---|---|---|---|
| Democratic | Rita A. Mendes | 5,066 | 92.45% |
| Democratic | Fred Fontaine | 414 | 7.55% |
| Total votes | | 5,480 | 100.00% |
| Democratic hold | | | |

=== 12th Plymouth ===
Primary Election Results
| Party | Candidate | Votes | % |
Democratic Party Primary Results
| Democratic | Kathleen R. LaNatra (incumbent) | 4,118 | 100.00% |
| Total votes | | 4,118 | 100.00% |
Republican Party Primary Results
| Republican | Eric J. Meschino | 2,561 | 100.00% |
| Total votes | | 2,561 | 100.00% |

General Election Results
| Party | Candidate | Votes | % |
|---|---|---|---|
| Democratic | Kathleen R. LaNatra (incumbent) | 10,603 | 52.42% |
| Republican | Eric J. Meschino | 8,767 | 43.35% |
| Independent | Charles F. McCoy, Jr | 856 | 4.23% |
| Total votes | | 20,226 | 100.00% |
| Democratic hold | | | |

=== 1st Suffolk ===
Primary Election Results
| Party | Candidate | Votes | % |
Democratic Party Primary Results
| Democratic | Adrian C. Madaro (incumbent) | 2,394 | 100.00% |
| Total votes | | 2,394 | 100.00% |

General Election Results
| Party | Candidate | Votes | % |
|---|---|---|---|
| Democratic | Adrian C. Madaro (incumbent) | 7,022 | 100.00% |
| Total votes | | 7,022 | 100.00% |
| Democratic hold | | | |

=== 2nd Suffolk ===
Primary Election Results
| Party | Candidate | Votes | % |
Democratic Party Primary Results
| Democratic | Daniel Joseph Ryan (incumbent) | 3,052 | 100.00% |
| Total votes | | 3,052 | 100.00% |

General Election Results
| Party | Candidate | Votes | % |
|---|---|---|---|
| Democratic | Daniel Joseph Ryan (incumbent) | 8,963 | 100.00% |
| Total votes | | 8,963 | 100.00% |
| Democratic hold | | | |

=== 3rd Suffolk ===
Primary Election Results
| Party | Candidate | Votes | % |
Democratic Party Primary Results
| Democratic | Aaron M. Michlewitz (incumbent) | 3,242 | 100.00% |
| Total votes | | 3,242 | 100.00% |

General Election Results
| Party | Candidate | Votes | % |
|---|---|---|---|
| Democratic | Aaron M. Michlewitz (incumbent) | 9,238 | 100.00% |
| Total votes | | 9,238 | 100.00% |
| Democratic hold | | | |

=== 4th Suffolk ===
Primary Election Results
| Party | Candidate | Votes | % |
Democratic Party Primary Results
| Democratic | David Biele (incumbent) | 3,463 | 100.00% |
| Total votes | | 3,463 | 100.00% |

General Election Results
| Party | Candidate | Votes | % |
|---|---|---|---|
| Democratic | David Biele (incumbent) | 11,566 | 100.00% |
| Total votes | | 11,566 | 100.00% |
| Democratic hold | | | |

=== 5th Suffolk ===
Primary Election Results
| Party | Candidate | Votes | % |
Democratic Party Primary Results
| Democratic | Christopher J. Worrell | 1,667 | 43.70% |
| Democratic | Danielson Tavares | 1,274 | 33.39% |
| Democratic | Althea Garrison | 874 | 22.91% |
| Total votes | | 3,815 | 100.00% |

General Election Results
| Party | Candidate | Votes | % |
|---|---|---|---|
| Democratic | Christopher J. Worrell | 5,939 | 88.59% |
| Independent | Roy A. Owens | 750 | 11.19% |
| Democratic | Althea Garrison | 15 | 0.22% |
| Total votes | | 6,704 | 100.00% |
| Democratic hold | | | |

=== 6th Suffolk ===
Primary Election Results
| Party | Candidate | Votes | % |
Democratic Party Primary Results
| Democratic | Russell E. Holmes (incumbent) | 3,242 | 75.64% |
| Democratic | Haris Hassan Hardaway | 1,044 | 24.36% |
| Total votes | | 4,286 | 100.00% |

General Election Results
| Party | Candidate | Votes | % |
|---|---|---|---|
| Democratic | Russell E. Holmes (incumbent) | 7,675 | 100.00% |
| Total votes | | 7,675 | 100.00% |
| Democratic hold | | | |

=== 7th Suffolk ===
Primary Election Results
| Party | Candidate | Votes | % |
Democratic Party Primary Results
| Democratic | Chynah Tyler (incumbent) | 2,735 | 100.00% |
| Total votes | | 2,735 | 100.00% |

General Election Results
| Party | Candidate | Votes | % |
|---|---|---|---|
| Democratic | Chynah Tyler (incumbent) | 5,317 | 100.00% |
| Total votes | | 5,317 | 100.00% |
| Democratic hold | | | |

=== 8th Suffolk ===
Primary Election Results
| Party | Candidate | Votes | % |
Democratic Party Primary Results
| Democratic | Jay D. Livingstone (incumbent) | 3,534 | 100.00% |
| Total votes | | 3,534 | 100.00% |

General Election Results
| Party | Candidate | Votes | % |
|---|---|---|---|
| Democratic | Jay D. Livingstone (incumbent) | 9,701 | 100.00% |
| Total votes | | 9,701 | 100.00% |
| Democratic hold | | | |

=== 9th Suffolk ===
Primary Election Results
| Party | Candidate | Votes | % |
Democratic Party Primary Results
| Democratic | Jon Santiago (incumbent) | 3,787 | 100.00% |
| Total votes | | 3,787 | 100.00% |

General Election Results
| Party | Candidate | Votes | % |
|---|---|---|---|
| Democratic | Jon Santiago (incumbent) | 9,957 | 100.00% |
| Total votes | | 9,957 | 100.00% |
| Democratic hold | | | |

=== 10th Suffolk ===
Primary Election Results
| Party | Candidate | Votes | % |
Democratic Party Primary Results
| Democratic | Edward Francis Coppinger (incumbent) | 7,235 | 100.00% |
| Total votes | | 7,235 | 100.00% |

General Election Results
| Party | Candidate | Votes | % |
|---|---|---|---|
| Democratic | Edward Francis Coppinger (incumbent) | 15,817 | 100.00% |
| Total votes | | 15,817 | 100.00% |
| Democratic hold | | | |

=== 11th Suffolk ===
Primary Election Results
| Party | Candidate | Votes | % |
Democratic Party Primary Results
| Democratic | Judith A. García | 1,135 | 41.50% |
| Democratic | Roberto Andres Jimenez-Rivera | 867 | 31.70% |
| Democratic | Leo Robinson | 733 | 26.80% |
| Total votes | | 2,735 | 100.00% |
Republican Party Primary Results
| Republican | Todd B. Taylor | 323 | 100.00% |
| Total votes | | 323 | 100.00% |

General Election Results
| Party | Candidate | Votes | % |
|---|---|---|---|
| Democratic | Judith A. García | 4,127 | 72.67% |
| Republican | Todd B. Taylor | 1,552 | 27.33% |
| Total votes | | 5,679 | 100.00% |
| Democratic hold | | | |

=== 12th Suffolk ===
Primary Election Results
| Party | Candidate | Votes | % |
Democratic Party Primary Results
| Democratic | Brandy Fluker Oakley (incumbent) | 5,480 | 100.00% |
| Total votes | | 5,480 | 100.00% |

General Election Results
| Party | Candidate | Votes | % |
|---|---|---|---|
| Democratic | Brandy Fluker Oakley (incumbent) | 10,729 | 100.00% |
| Total votes | | 10,729 | 100.00% |
| Democratic hold | | | |

=== 13th Suffolk ===
Primary Election Results
| Party | Candidate | Votes | % |
Democratic Party Primary Results
| Democratic | Daniel J. Hunt (incumbent) | 3,705 | 100.00% |
| Total votes | | 3,705 | 100.00% |

General Election Results
| Party | Candidate | Votes | % |
|---|---|---|---|
| Democratic | Daniel J. Hunt (incumbent) | 8,761 | 100.00% |
| Total votes | | 8,761 | 100.00% |
| Democratic hold | | | |

=== 14th Suffolk ===
Primary Election Results
| Party | Candidate | Votes | % |
Democratic Party Primary Results
| Democratic | Rob Consalvo (incumbent) | 5,440 | 100.00% |
| Total votes | | 5,440 | 100.00% |

General Election Results
| Party | Candidate | Votes | % |
|---|---|---|---|
| Democratic | Rob Consalvo (incumbent) | 11,565 | 100.00% |
| Total votes | | 11,565 | 100.00% |
| Democratic hold | | | |

=== 15th Suffolk ===
Primary Election Results
| Party | Candidate | Votes | % |
Democratic Party Primary Results
| Democratic | Samantha "Sam" Montaño | 3,954 | 57.71% |
| Democratic | Roxanne Longoria | 1,769 | 25.82% |
| Democratic | Richard Anthony Fierro | 687 | 10.03% |
| Democratic | Mary Ann Nelson | 441 | 6.44% |
| Total votes | | 6,851 | 100.00% |

General Election Results
| Party | Candidate | Votes | % |
|---|---|---|---|
| Democratic | Samantha "Sam" Montaño | 13,030 | 100.00% |
| Total votes | | 13,030 | 100.00% |
| Democratic hold | | | |

=== 16th Suffolk ===
Primary Election Results
| Party | Candidate | Votes | % |
Democratic Party Primary Results
| Democratic | Jessica Ann Giannino (incumbent) | 1,881 | 100.00% |
| Total votes | | 1,881 | 100.00% |

General Election Results
| Party | Candidate | Votes | % |
|---|---|---|---|
| Democratic | Jessica Ann Giannino (incumbent) | 5,753 | 100.00% |
| Total votes | | 5,753 | 100.00% |
| Democratic hold | | | |

=== 17th Suffolk ===
Primary Election Results
| Party | Candidate | Votes | % |
Democratic Party Primary Results
| Democratic | Kevin G. Honan (incumbent) | 3,397 | 100.00% |
| Total votes | | 3,397 | 100.00% |

General Election Results
| Party | Candidate | Votes | % |
|---|---|---|---|
| Democratic | Kevin G. Honan (incumbent) | 9,581 | 100.00% |
| Total votes | | 9,581 | 100.00% |
| Democratic hold | | | |

=== 18th Suffolk ===
Primary Election Results
| Party | Candidate | Votes | % |
Democratic Party Primary Results
| Democratic | Michael J. Moran (incumbent) | 2,109 | 100.00% |
| Total votes | | 2,109 | 100.00% |

General Election Results
| Party | Candidate | Votes | % |
|---|---|---|---|
| Democratic | Michael J. Moran (incumbent) | 6,200 | 100.00% |
| Total votes | | 6,200 | 100.00% |
| Democratic hold | | | |

=== 19th Suffolk ===
Primary Election Results
| Party | Candidate | Votes | % |
Democratic Party Primary Results
| Democratic | Jeffrey Rosario Turco (incumbent) | 2,507 | 100.00% |
| Total votes | | 2,507 | 100.00% |

General Election Results
| Party | Candidate | Votes | % |
|---|---|---|---|
| Democratic | Jeffrey Rosario Turco (incumbent) | 7,803 | 100.00% |
| Total votes | | 7,803 | 100.00% |
| Democratic hold | | | |

=== 1st Worcester ===
Primary Election Results
| Party | Candidate | Votes | % |
Republican Party Primary Results
| Republican | Kimberly N. Ferguson (incumbent) | 2,649 | 100.00% |
| Total votes | | 2,649 | 100.00% |

General Election Results
| Party | Candidate | Votes | % |
|---|---|---|---|
| Republican | Kimberly N. Ferguson (incumbent) | 16,342 | 100.00% |
| Total votes | | 16,342 | 100.00% |
| Republican hold | | | |

=== 2nd Worcester ===
Primary Election Results
| Party | Candidate | Votes | % |
Democratic Party Primary Results
| Democratic | Jonathan D. Zlotnik (incumbent) | 2,947 | 100.00% |
| Total votes | | 2,947 | 100.00% |
Republican Party Primary Results
| Republican | Bruce K. Chester | 1,684 | 100.00% |
| Total votes | | 1,684 | 100.00% |

General Election Results
| Party | Candidate | Votes | % |
|---|---|---|---|
| Democratic | Jonathan D. Zlotnik (incumbent) | 7,667 | 53.50% |
| Republican | Bruce K. Chester | 6,664 | 46.50% |
| Total votes | | 14,331 | 100.00% |
| Democratic hold | | | |

=== 3rd Worcester ===
Primary Election Results
| Party | Candidate | Votes | % |
Democratic Party Primary Results
| Democratic | Michael P. Kushmerek (incumbent) | 2,490 | 100.00% |
| Total votes | | 2,490 | 100.00% |
Republican Party Primary Results
| Republican | Aaron L. Packard | 1,180 | 100.00% |
| Total votes | | 1,180 | 100.00% |

General Election Results
| Party | Candidate | Votes | % |
|---|---|---|---|
| Democratic | Michael P. Kushmerek (incumbent) | 6,824 | 62.71% |
| Republican | Aaron L. Packard | 4,058 | 37.29% |
| Total votes | | 10,882 | 100.00% |
| Democratic hold | | | |

=== 4th Worcester ===
Primary Election Results
| Party | Candidate | Votes | % |
Democratic Party Primary Results
| Democratic | Natalie Higgins (incumbent) | 2,480 | 100.00% |
| Total votes | | 2,480 | 100.00% |

General Election Results
| Party | Candidate | Votes | % |
|---|---|---|---|
| Democratic | Natalie Higgins (incumbent) | 7,193 | 52.49% |
| Independent | John M. Dombrowski | 6,510 | 47.51% |
| Total votes | | 13,703 | 100.00% |
| Democratic hold | | | |

=== 5th Worcester ===
Primary Election Results
| Party | Candidate | Votes | % |
Democratic Party Primary Results
| Democratic | Samuel Biagetti | 51 | 100.00% |
| Total votes | | 51 | 100.00% |
Republican Party Primary Results
| Republican | Donald R. Berthiaume, Jr (incumbent) | 2,939 | 100.00% |
| Total votes | | 2,939 | 100.00% |

General Election Results
| Party | Candidate | Votes | % |
|---|---|---|---|
| Republican | Donald R. Berthiaume, Jr (incumbent) | 14,151 | 100.00% |
| Total votes | | 14,151 | 100.00% |
| Republican hold | | | |

=== 6th Worcester ===
Primary Election Results
| Party | Candidate | Votes | % |
Republican Party Primary Results
| Republican | Peter J. Durant (incumbent) | 2,000 | 100.00% |
| Total votes | | 2,000 | 100.00% |

General Election Results
| Party | Candidate | Votes | % |
|---|---|---|---|
| Republican | Peter J. Durant (incumbent) | 10,526 | 100.00% |
| Total votes | | 10,526 | 100.00% |
| Republican hold | | | |

=== 7th Worcester ===
Primary Election Results
| Party | Candidate | Votes | % |
Republican Party Primary Results
| Republican | Paul K. Frost (incumbent) | 2,091 | 100.00% |
| Total votes | | 2,091 | 100.00% |

General Election Results
| Party | Candidate | Votes | % |
|---|---|---|---|
| Republican | Paul K. Frost (incumbent) | 12,432 | 75.35% |
| Independent | Terry Burke Dotson | 4,067 | 24.65% |
| Total votes | | 16,499 | 100.00% |
| Republican hold | | | |

=== 8th Worcester ===
Primary Election Results
| Party | Candidate | Votes | % |
Republican Party Primary Results
| Republican | Michael J. Soter (incumbent) | 2,182 | 100.00% |
| Total votes | | 2,182 | 100.00% |

General Election Results
| Party | Candidate | Votes | % |
|---|---|---|---|
| Republican | Michael J. Soter (incumbent) | 13,182 | 100.00% |
| Total votes | | 13,182 | 100.00% |
| Republican hold | | | |

=== 9th Worcester ===
Primary Election Results
| Party | Candidate | Votes | % |
Republican Party Primary Results
| Republican | David K. Muradian, Jr (incumbent) | 1,955 | 100.00% |
| Total votes | | 1,955 | 100.00% |

General Election Results
| Party | Candidate | Votes | % |
|---|---|---|---|
| Republican | David K. Muradian, Jr (incumbent) | 13,516 | 100.00% |
| Total votes | | 13,516 | 100.00% |
| Republican hold | | | |

=== 10th Worcester ===
Primary Election Results
| Party | Candidate | Votes | % |
Democratic Party Primary Results
| Democratic | Brian William Murray (incumbent) | 2,939 | 100.00% |
| Total votes | | 2,939 | 100.00% |

General Election Results
| Party | Candidate | Votes | % |
|---|---|---|---|
| Democratic | Brian William Murray (incumbent) | 10,323 | 100.00% |
| Total votes | | 10,323 | 100.00% |
| Democratic hold | | | |

=== 11th Worcester ===
Primary Election Results
| Party | Candidate | Votes | % |
Democratic Party Primary Results
| Democratic | Stephen Fishman | 2,943 | 100.00% |
| Total votes | | 2,943 | 100.00% |
Republican Party Primary Results
| Republican | Hannah E. Kane (incumbent) | 1,572 | 100.00% |
| Total votes | | 1,572 | 100.00% |

General Election Results
| Party | Candidate | Votes | % |
|---|---|---|---|
| Republican | Hannah E. Kane (incumbent) | 9,194 | 58.60% |
| Democratic | Stephen Fishman | 6,496 | 41.40% |
| Total votes | | 15,690 | 100.00% |
| Republican hold | | | |

=== 12th Worcester ===
Primary Election Results
| Party | Candidate | Votes | % |
Democratic Party Primary Results
| Democratic | Meghan Kilcoyne (incumbent) | 3,993 | 100.00% |
| Total votes | | 3,993 | 100.00% |
Republican Party Primary Results
| Republican | Michael A. Vulcano | 1,872 | 100.00% |
| Total votes | | 1,872 | 100.00% |

General Election Results
| Party | Candidate | Votes | % |
|---|---|---|---|
| Democratic | Meghan Kilcoyne (incumbent) | 11,044 | 60.38% |
| Republican | Michael A. Vulcano | 7,247 | 39.62% |
| Total votes | | 18,291 | 100.00% |
| Democratic hold | | | |

=== 13th Worcester ===
Primary Election Results
| Party | Candidate | Votes | % |
Democratic Party Primary Results
| Democratic | John J. Mahoney, Jr. (incumbent) | 4,295 | 100.00% |
| Total votes | | 4,295 | 100.00% |

General Election Results
| Party | Candidate | Votes | % |
|---|---|---|---|
| Democratic | John J. Mahoney, Jr. (incumbent) | 10,413 | 100.00% |
| Total votes | | 10,413 | 100.00% |
| Democratic hold | | | |

=== 14th Worcester ===
Primary Election Results
| Party | Candidate | Votes | % |
Democratic Party Primary Results
| Democratic | James J. O'Day (incumbent) | 3,383 | 100.00% |
| Total votes | | 3,383 | 100.00% |

General Election Results
| Party | Candidate | Votes | % |
|---|---|---|---|
| Democratic | James J. O'Day (incumbent) | 9,293 | 100.00% |
| Total votes | | 9,293 | 100.00% |
| Democratic hold | | | |

=== 15th Worcester ===
Primary Election Results
| Party | Candidate | Votes | % |
Democratic Party Primary Results
| Democratic | Mary S. Keefe (incumbent) | 1,526 | 100.00% |
| Total votes | | 1,526 | 100.00% |

General Election Results
| Party | Candidate | Votes | % |
|---|---|---|---|
| Democratic | Mary S. Keefe (incumbent) | 4,540 | 100.00% |
| Total votes | | 4,540 | 100.00% |
| Democratic hold | | | |

=== 16th Worcester ===
Primary Election Results
| Party | Candidate | Votes | % |
Democratic Party Primary Results
| Democratic | Daniel M. Donahue (incumbent) | 1,953 | 100.00% |
| Total votes | | 1,953 | 100.00% |

General Election Results
| Party | Candidate | Votes | % |
|---|---|---|---|
| Democratic | Daniel M. Donahue (incumbent) | 6,111 | 100.00% |
| Total votes | | 6,111 | 100.00% |
| Democratic hold | | | |

=== 17th Worcester ===
Primary Election Results
| Party | Candidate | Votes | % |
Democratic Party Primary Results
| Democratic | David Henry Argosky LeBoeuf (incumbent) | 1,909 | 100.00% |
| Total votes | | 1,909 | 100.00% |
Republican Party Primary Results
| Republican | Paul J. Fullen | 779 | 100.00% |
| Total votes | | 779 | 100.00% |

General Election Results
| Party | Candidate | Votes | % |
|---|---|---|---|
| Democratic | David Henry Argosky LeBoeuf (incumbent) | 4,745 | 59.20% |
| Republican | Paul J. Fullen | 3,270 | 40.80% |
| Total votes | | 8,015 | 100.00% |
| Democratic hold | | | |

=== 18th Worcester ===
Primary Election Results
| Party | Candidate | Votes | % |
Republican Party Primary Results
| Republican | Joseph D. McKenna (incumbent) | 2,319 | 100.00% |
| Total votes | | 2,319 | 100.00% |

General Election Results
| Party | Candidate | Votes | % |
|---|---|---|---|
| Republican | Joseph D. McKenna (incumbent) | 13,642 | 100.00% |
| Total votes | | 13,642 | 100.00% |
| Republican hold | | | |

=== 19th Worcester ===
Primary Election Results
| Party | Candidate | Votes | % |
Democratic Party Primary Results
| Democratic | Kate Donaghue | 4,248 | 100.00% |
| Total votes | | 4,248 | 100.00% |
Republican Party Primary Results
| Republican | Jonathan I. Hostage | 1,348 | 100.00% |
| Total votes | | 1,348 | 100.00% |

General Election Results
| Party | Candidate | Votes | % |
|---|---|---|---|
| Democratic | Kate Donaghue | 11,560 | 67.52% |
| Republican | Jonathan I. Hostage | 5,560 | 32.48% |
| Total votes | | 17,120 | 100.00% |
| Democratic win (new seat) | | | |

== See also ==
- 2023-24 Massachusetts legislature
- 2022 United States elections
- 2022 United States House of Representatives elections in Massachusetts
- 2022 Massachusetts general election
- 2022 Massachusetts Senate election
- 2019–2020 Massachusetts legislature
- 2021–2022 Massachusetts legislature
