= Garrett Bradley =

Garrett Bradley may refer to:

- Garrett Bradley (filmmaker) (born 1986), American filmmaker
- Garrett Bradley (politician) (born 1970), American lawyer and politician
