= Jim Miceli =

American politician (1935–2018)

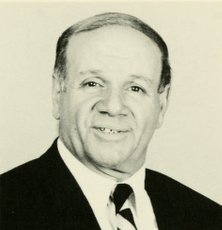
- Miceli circa 1995

Member of the Massachusetts House of Representatives from the 19th Middlesex district
- In office 1977 – April 21, 2018
- Succeeded by: Dave Robertson

Personal details
- Born: March 25, 1935 Boston, Massachusetts, U.S.
- Died: April 21, 2018 (aged 83) Wilmington, Massachusetts, U.S.
- Party: Democratic

James R. Miceli (March 25, 1935 – April 21, 2018) was an American Democratic politician who represented Middlesex County's 19th district in the Massachusetts State Legislature.

== Career ==
Micelli was born in Dorchester, Boston, Massachusetts. He served on the board of selectmen from 1966 to 1977 and was chair of the board of selectmen. Miceli was first elected to the state house in 1977 and served until his death. He received his bachelor's degree of science in business administration from Northeastern University.

He also ran in the special election to replace Marty Meehan in the United States House of Representatives. Miceli was a conservative Democrat. He supported immigration enforcement, the death penalty, opposed abortion and same-sex marriage.

== Death ==
Miceli died in his hometown of Wilmington, Massachusetts after collapsing and going into cardiac arrest at a Little League Baseball ceremony.
