= Michael Soter =

Massachusetts politician

Mike Soter

Member of the Massachusetts House of Representatives from the 8th Worcester district
- Incumbent
- Assumed office January 2019
- Preceded by: Kevin Kuros

Personal details
- Born: November 10, 1973 (age 52)
- Party: Republican
- Education: Nichols College

Michael J. Soter (born November 10, 1973) is a state representative who represents the 8th Worcester district in the Massachusetts House of Representatives. He represents the towns of Blackstone, Millville, Uxbridge, and Bellingham. Soter serves as the Ranking Minority on the Joint Committee on Children, Families and Persons with Disabilities, and as a member of the Joint Committee on Economic Development and Emerging Technologies, the Joint Committee on Municipalities and Regional Government, and the Joint Committee on Public Health.

Before being elected to the state legislature, Soter served 7 years on the Bellingham Board of Selectmen.

== See also ==
- 2019–2020 Massachusetts legislature
- 2021–2022 Massachusetts legislature
