= Carole Fiola =

American politician

Carole A. Fiola
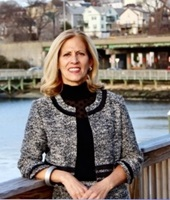

Member of the Massachusetts House of Representatives from the 6th Bristol district
- Incumbent
- Assumed office September 25, 2013
- Preceded by: David B. Sullivan

Member of the Massachusetts Governor's Council from the 1st district
- In office 2001–2011
- Preceded by: David F. Constantine
- Succeeded by: Charles Cipollini

Personal details
- Born: March 3, 1960 (age 66) Fall River, Massachusetts, U.S.
- Party: Democratic
- Spouse: Kenneth Fiola Jr.
- Children: 2
- Education: University of Massachusetts Amherst
- Occupation: Realtor

Carole A. Fiola is an American politician elected to the Massachusetts House of Representatives in September 2013. She was sworn-in September 25, 2013. She is a Fall River resident and a member of the Democratic Party.

Fiola served five two-year terms on the Massachusetts Governor's Council, to which she was first elected in 2000. She decided against seeking re-election in 2010. She is also a real estate agent in Fall River.

== See also ==
- 2019–2020 Massachusetts legislature
- 2021–2022 Massachusetts legislature
