= Paul McMurtry =

American politician

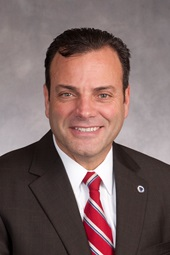

Member of the Massachusetts House of Representatives from the 11th Norfolk district
- Incumbent
- Assumed office May 30, 2007
- Preceded by: Robert Coughlin

Personal details
- Born: October 28, 1965 (age 60) Boston, Massachusetts, U.S.
- Party: Democratic
- Parents: Robert H. McMurtry (father); Annmarie Ubertini (mother)
- Education: Northeastern University (B.S.B.A.)
- Occupation: Legislator, Movie Theater Owner

Paul McMurtry (October 28, 1965) is an American politician from Massachusetts. A Democrat, he has served in the Massachusetts House of Representatives since 2007. He represents the Eleventh Norfolk District, which includes his hometown of Dedham, Westwood, and the Eighth Precinct of Walpole.

McMurtry attended elementary school at the now-closed Dexter School in Dedham, and graduated from Dedham High School. He earned his B.S.B.A. in Management from Northeastern University. He has been self-employed since the age of twenty as the owner of several small businesses, including PM Productions, a video store he created while in college, and the Dedham Community Theatre, which he currently owns and operates. McMurtry is actively involved in the local branch of Rotary International, where he served twice as club president.

Representative McMurtry ran in a special election in 2007 to replace outgoing Representative Robert Coughlin. McMurtry ran as an independent having not held any prior elected office. He won a plurality of the vote in the three way race, garnering 37.6% of the vote overall and 53.8% in his hometown of Dedham. McMurtry ran unopposed for re-election in every subsequent biannual election until John McDonald challenged him in 2018.

== Personal life ==
McMurtry is Catholic and is a member of the Knights of Columbus.

== Political career ==
Since assuming office, Representative McMurtry has been actively involved in various legislative committees. As of the 2023-2024 legislative session, he serves as the Chair of the Joint Committee on Community Development and Small Businesses. In previous sessions, he has held roles such as House Chair of the Joint Committee on Veterans and Federal Affairs and Chair of the Joint Committee on Tourism, Arts and Cultural Development.

As a business owner, he was also deeply involved in discussions surrounding Dedham's Legacy Place, emphasizing the potential impact of new movie screens on Dedham Community Theatre, which he owned. His involvement in this issue was complicated by his dual role as both a state representative and a local business owner, prompting questions about potential conflicts of interest.

McMurtry's early legislative priorities centered on economic growth and infrastructure. He supported the development of Westwood Station while advocating for measures to minimize traffic congestion on Canton Street, which connects Dedham and Westwood.

In 2008, McMurtry became a central figure in a heated legislative battle to grant Wegmans supermarket a beer and wine license at the planned $1.5 billion Westwood Station development. McMurtry encountered strong opposition from fellow representatives, notably Angelo Scaccia and William C. Galvin, who cited concerns over increased traffic and competitive disadvantages for existing businesses like Roche Bros.

In 2018, McMurtry was one of the original sponsors of Bill H.4479, which placed restrictions on e-cigarettes and raised the age for buying tobacco from 18 to 21. Citing the increasing vaping epidemic among youth, McMurtry sponsored the bill in able to "prevent young people from taking up the deadly habit and getting addicted to nicotine products". Governor Charlie Baker subsequently signed McMurtry's legislation.

The same year, McMurtry filed legislation to protect independent auto repair shops against vehicle manufacturers. Some vehicle manufacturers use wireless technology to bypass current right to repair information sharing laws, and McMurtry's bill intends to renew discussion on keeping laws updated with the progress of technology.

In January 2019, Representative McMurtry faced allegations of inappropriate conduct during an orientation event for new lawmakers. A special committee was formed to investigate the claims. After a thorough review, the committee concluded in March 2019 that there was "insufficient evidence" to support the allegations, and no action was taken.

== Electoral history ==
Massachusetts General Court 11th Norfolk District, 2007 (Special Election)
| Party | Candidate | Votes | % | ±% |
|---|---|---|---|---|
| Independent | Paul McMurtry | 2,948 | 37.58% | |
| Republican | Douglas E. Obey | 2,466 | 31.44% | |
| Democratic | Stephen M. Bilafer | 2,424 | 30.90% | |
| | All Others | 6 | 0.08% | |
| | Blank Votes | 1 | | |

Massachusetts General Court 11th Norfolk District, 2018
| Party | Candidate | Votes | % | ±% |
|---|---|---|---|---|
| Democratic | Paul McMurtry | 14,046 | 66.98% | |
| Republican | John G. McDonald | 6,904 | 32.92% | |
| | All Others | 21 | 0.10% | |
| | Blank Votes | 1,317 | | |

Massachusetts General Court 11th Norfolk District, 2024
| Party | Candidate | Votes | % | ±% |
|---|---|---|---|---|
| Democratic | Paul McMurtry | 16,529 | 67.87% | |
| Independent | Andrew Pepoli | 7,644 | 31.91% | |
| | All Others | 55 | 0.23% | |
| | Blank Votes | 3,221 | | |

== See also ==
- 2019–2020 Massachusetts legislature
- 2021–2022 Massachusetts legislature
