= Garrett Bradley (politician) =

American politician

Garrett J. Bradley
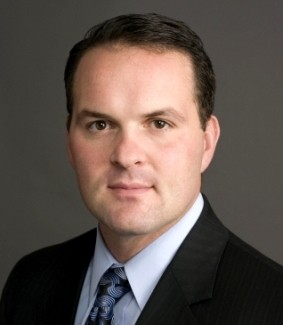

Member of the Massachusetts House of Representatives from the 3rd Plymouth district
- In office January 3, 2001 – July 31, 2016
- Preceded by: Mary Jeanette Murray
- Succeeded by: Joan Meschino

Personal details
- Born: Garrett James Bradley; July 4, 1970 (age 56) Woburn, Massachusetts, U.S.
- Party: Democratic
- Spouse: Heather
- Children: 3
- Education: Boston College (BA, JD)
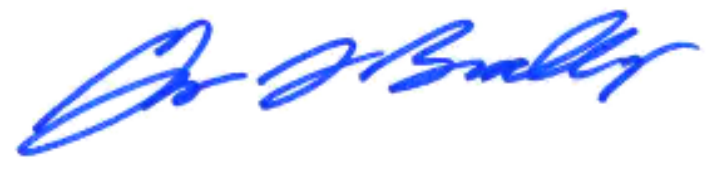
- Signature

Garrett James Bradley (born July 4, 1970) is an American lawyer and the former representative in the Massachusetts House of Representatives for the 3rd Plymouth district, which consists of the town of Cohasset, in the county of Norfolk; plus the towns of Hingham and Hull, both in the county of Plymouth.

== Early life and career ==
Bradley attended Boston College High School, where he graduated from in 1988. He then attended Boston College, where he received a bachelor's degree in 1992. He also received a Juris Doctor degree from Boston College Law School in 1995. He has previously worked as an Assistant District Attorney in the Plymouth County District Attorney's office, and also works with the Thornton Law Firm law office.

== Political career ==
Bradley served on the Hingham Capital Outlay Committee and was a member of the Hingham Democratic Town Committee before running for State Representative. Bradley first ran for the 3rd Plymouth district in 1998, but was defeated in the general election by Republican Mary Jeanette Murray. Bradley ran again in 2000, and defeated Republican Mary Ann McKenna in the general election. Bradley was reelected to the seat seven times.

Bradley served as Second Assistant Majority Leader, First Division Leader, House Chairman of the Joint Committee on Election Laws, and Vice-Chairman of the Committee on The Judiciary. He also served on the Joint Committee on Rules, the Special Joint Committee on Redistricting, and the House Committee on Rules. He voted in favor of casino gambling in 2011.

== Electoral history ==
Massachusetts State Representative 3rd Plymouth District, 2000
Party	Candidate	Votes	%	±%
Democratic	Garrett Bradley	12,193	56.20	
Republican	Mary Ann McKenna	7,794	35.92	

Massachusetts State Representative 3rd Plymouth District, 1998
Party	Candidate	Votes	%	±%
Republican	Mary Jeanette Murray	8,202	52.46	
Democratic	Garrett Bradley	7,105	45.44	
