= Denise Garlick =

American state legislator

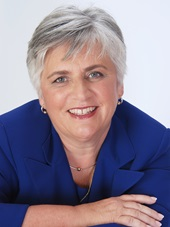

Member of the Massachusetts House of Representatives from the 13th Norfolk district
- In office 2011–2024
- Preceded by: Lida E. Harkins
- Succeeded by: Joshua Tarsky

Personal details
- Party: Democratic

Denise C. Garlick (née Collatos) is an American state legislator who represented the 13th Norfolk District in the Massachusetts House of Representatives.

Garlick was graduated from Dedham High School in 1972. Garlick attended the New England Baptist Hospital School of Nursing and Fitchburg State College BSN. She is a Needham resident and a member of the Democratic Party. In 2017, she was honored as the Massachusetts Developmental Disabilities Council's Legislator of the Year. She is also a registered nurse. In Needham she served as the vice chair of the Board of Selectmen, co-chair of the Needham Senior Center Exploratory Committee, and the chair for the Needham Board of Health.

== Issues ==
=== Women's Rights ===
Garlick is an advocate for a women's rights and access to reproductive care. Her legislative website contains her past actions on the issue and her stance on the topic:

"As a woman, a mother, a nurse, I support a woman’s right to make all choices, including reproductive choices. I support laws that guarantee this right and I work to ensure access to quality healthcare and education and advocacy services."

=== Climate Change ===
Garlick has worked to raise the renewable portfolio standard and net metering cap. She supports policies that promote environmental justice. She supports transforming the power grid to 100% renewable sources and the decarbonization of the transportation sector.

=== LGBTQ Rights ===
Garlick voted in favor of the 2016 anti-discrimination bill to protect transgender people from discrimination in public places. In addition she also voted yes on ballot question 3 to uphold the law.

"LGBTQ rights have always been important to me, as Chair of the LGBTQ Aging Commission and as chief sponsor of the funding for the LGBTQ Youth Commission."

== Electoral history ==
Garlick had no challenger in either the Democratic primary or the general election after 2018.

Massachusetts 13th Norfolk Democratic Primary, 2018
Party	Candidate	Votes	%
Democratic	Denise C. Garlick	5,595	80.0
Democratic	Theodore L. Steinberg	1,396	20.0
Write-in		4	0.1
Total votes		6,995	100.0

Massachusetts 13th Norfolk General Election, 2010
Party	Candidate	Votes	%
Democratic	Denise C. Garlick	10,661	55.3
Republican	John P. O'Leary	8,597	44.6
Write-in		15	0.1
Total votes		19,273	100.0

Massachusetts 13th Norfolk Democratic Primary, 2010
Party	Candidate	Votes	%
Democratic	Denise C. Garlick	2,799	46.4
Democratic	Gerald A. Wasserman	2,571	42.6
Democratic	Gary B. McNeill	653	10.8
Write-in		6	0.1
Total votes		6,029	100.0

== See also ==
- 2019–2020 Massachusetts legislature
- 2021–2022 Massachusetts legislature
