= Dave Robertson (Massachusetts politician) =

American politician

Member of the Massachusetts House of Representatives from the 19th Middlesex district
- Incumbent
- Assumed office January 2, 2019
- Preceded by: Jim Miceli

Personal details
- Party: Democratic
- Education: University of Massachusetts, Amherst

David Allen Robertson is a State Representative currently serving in the Massachusetts House representing parts of Tewksbury and Wilmington. He has been serving since 2019 and is a member of the Democratic Party.

Robertson is a lifelong resident of Tewksbury, Massachusetts, one of the townships he represents in the state legislature. According to his campaign website, Robertson graduated from the University of Massachusetts, Amherst, double majoring in economics and political science. He previously served in the office of former State Representative James R. Miceli.

== Career ==
Robertson served ten years in the office of former State Representative James R. Miceli, starting with an internship. Robertson later served as a constituent affairs aide, a legislative researcher, and finally Miceli's Chief of Staff. Robertson won a five-way Democratic primary to become the Democratic nominee in the general election on November 6, 2018. He won the general election with 48.2% of the vote, to his opponents 43.4% and 8.3%.

=== Committees ===
Robertson currently serves on the Joint Committee on Environment, Natural Resources and Agriculture, the Joint Committee on Labor and Workforce Development, the Joint Committee on Telecommunications, Utilities and Energy, and the Joint Committee on Veterans and Federal Affairs.

== See also ==
- 2019–2020 Massachusetts legislature
