= Joan Meschino =

American politician

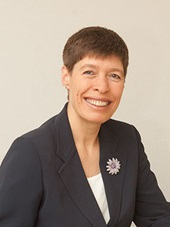

Member of the Massachusetts House of Representatives from the 3rd Plymouth District
- Incumbent
- Assumed office 2017
- Preceded by: Garrett Bradley

Personal details
- Born: Quincy, Massachusetts, U.S.
- Party: Democrat
- Spouse: John Harre
- Education: Harvard University
- Profession: Attorney
- Website: joanmeschino.com

Joan Meschino is an attorney and American politician from Hull, Massachusetts. On November 8, 2016, she was elected the state representative for the Third Plymouth district.

== Early life and career ==
She was born in Quincy, Massachusetts. Her father was a lobsterman and a small business owner based out of Hull. While in college she worked as a sternman on her father's boat to pay for tuition at Harvard University. She graduated from Harvard in 1987 with a B.A. in English. Meschino later earned her J.D. at the University of New Hampshire School of Law in 1994.

Meschino served as Executive Director of the Massachusetts Appleseed Center for Law and Justice from 2007 to 2015. As head of the public interest law center she worked to expand access to education and advocated for social justice reforms that benefited for residents of Massachusetts.

She currently serves on the Women's Bar Association of Massachusetts Emeritus Board, the Massachusetts Bar Association's Access to Justice Section Council and is a board member of the Hull Lifesaving Museum.

== Political career ==
Meschino was elected to the Town of Hull's Board of Selectmen in 2004. She served two three-year terms, with one year as chairman.

In 2006, she was appointed as Commissioner of the Metropolitan Beaches Commission. She also currently serves on the Metropolitan Area Planning Council's Executive Committee, and on the Hull Capital Outlay Committee.

In spring 2016, she ran in the special election for the Massachusetts State Senate seat representing the Plymouth & Norfolk district. The seat was vacant following Robert Hedlund's (R) election to mayor of Weymouth in 2015. She beat Hingham selectman Paul Gannon to become the Democratic nominee in April 2016. In May 2016, Meschino lost the general election to Weymouth Town Council President Patrick O'Connor (R).

In June 2016, Meschino announced she would run again for the State Senate in the November 2016 election, setting up a rematch with Patrick O'Connor for the Plymouth & Norfolk district. That same July, incumbent state representative Garrett Bradley announced he would not seek re-election to the 3rd Plymouth district (despite having filed for re-election). In light of this, Joan Meschino decided to run a write-in campaign for the 3rd Plymouth district instead of running for State Senate. Her primary challenger in the race for Bradley's seat was Hingham resident Stephen Burm (D). On September 8, 2016 Meschino won the Democratic nomination for both State Senate (her name was still on the ballot) and state representative for the 3rd Plymouth district. She declined to accept the nomination for the State Senate.

Joan defeated first-time candidate Kristen Arute (R) of Hingham in the general election for the 3rd Plymouth district on November 8, 2016.

== Awards ==
In 2014, Joan Meschino was honored with a "Top Women in Law" award from the Massachusetts Lawyers Weekly.

== Personal life ==
She lives with her husband John Harre, an intellectual property lawyer, in Hull, Massachusetts. She is one of four children.

== See also ==
- 2019–2020 Massachusetts legislature
- 2021–2022 Massachusetts legislature
