= James Arciero =

American politician

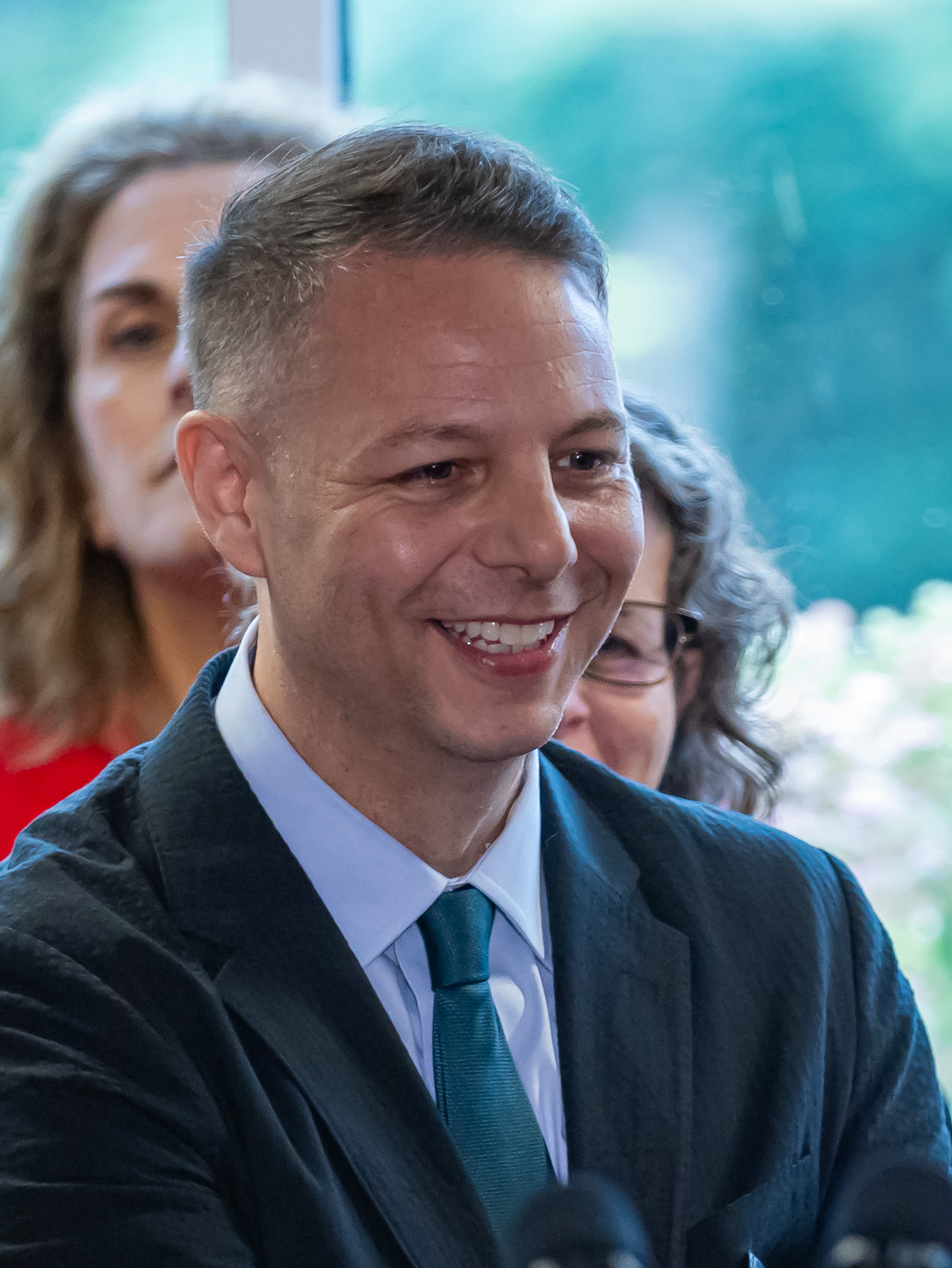
- Arciero in 2024

Member of the Massachusetts House of Representatives from the 2nd Middlesex district
- Incumbent
- Assumed office January 7, 2009
- Preceded by: Geoffrey D. Hall

Personal details
- Born: James Arciero; August 27, 1974 (age 51) Concord, Massachusetts
- Party: Democratic
- Education: University of Massachusetts, Dartmouth (BA); Suffolk University (MPA)

James Arciero (born August 27, 1974) is an American politician. He is a state legislator serving in the Massachusetts House of Representatives and is a Democrat.

== Early life ==
Arciero was born August 27, 1974, in Concord, Massachusetts, and later graduated from Westford Academy. He received the Eagle Scout award in 1993.

== Education ==
He graduated from the University of Massachusetts Dartmouth with a Bachelors of Arts degree in political science in 1997 and from Suffolk University with a Master of Public Administration degree in 2001.

== Political career ==
From 1996 to 1997 he was a member of the University of Massachusetts Board of Trustees. He is a former member of the Westford Democratic Town Committee.

In 2008, Arciero was elected to represent the Second Middlesex district in the Massachusetts House of Representatives, a position which he has held since.

== See also ==
- 2019–2020 Massachusetts legislature
- 2021–2022 Massachusetts legislature
