= Nicholas Boldyga =

American politician

Nick Boldyga
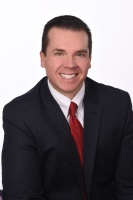

Member of the Massachusetts House of Representatives from the 3rd Hampden district
- Incumbent
- Assumed office January 2011
- Preceded by: Rosemary Sandlin

Personal details
- Party: Republican
- Spouse: Jessica Boldyga
- Children: 3 Children
- Education: Western New England College
- Occupation: Legislator
- Website: http://www.stickwithnick.org

Nicholas A. Boldyga is an American politician who represents the 3rd Hampden District in the Massachusetts House of Representatives.

First elected in November 2010, Boldyga's district includes the City of Agawam and the Towns of Blandford, Chester, Granville, Huntington, Middlefield, Montgomery, Russell, Southwick, and Tolland in Western Massachusetts.

He serves on the Joint Committee on Advanced Information Technology, the Internet, and Cybersecurity; the Joint Committee on Bonding, Capital Expenditures, and State Assets; the Joint Committee on Environment and Natural Resources; and the Joint Committee on Financial Services. He is the Ranking Republican on the House Committee on Intergovernmental Affairs.

Prior to serving in the Massachusetts House of Representatives, Representative Boldyga was a member of the Southwick Board of Selectmen and Parks & Recreation Commission.

Outside politics Boldyga has worked as a police officer in Simsbury, Connecticut, an auditor for Deloitte & Touche LLP, and has held various positions in the insurance and financial services industry.

Representative Boldyga holds a B.S.B.A in accounting from Western New England College and also a graduate of the Connecticut Police Academy.

== See also ==
- 2019–2020 Massachusetts legislature
- 2021–2022 Massachusetts legislature
