= Michael S. Day =

Massachusetts politician

Mike Day
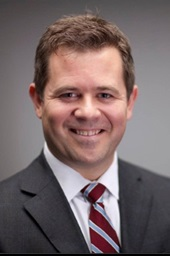

Member of the Massachusetts House of Representatives from the 31st Middlesex district
- Incumbent
- Assumed office January 7, 2015
- Preceded by: Jason Lewis

Personal details
- Party: Democratic
- Website: Legislative website

Michael Seamus Day is a member of the Massachusetts House of Representatives, sworn in January 2015. An attorney from Stoneham, Massachusetts, Day was elected as a Democrat to represent the 31st Middlesex district. After working as a Special Assistant District Attorney in Middlesex County, he founded his own law firm in 2012.

He has served as the House Chair of the Joint Committee on the Judiciary since 2021.

He and his wife Megan live in Stoneham and are raising three sons and care for two rescue dogs and two guinea pigs in their home. He has coached as a volunteer for Stoneham Youth Hockey since 2011.

== Education ==
Day graduated from Phillips Academy Andover and UMass-Amherst before earning his law degree from Georgetown University, where he attended the night division while working a full-time job in Washington, D.C.

== Committee Assignments ==
For the 2025-26 Session, Day sits on the following committees in the House:

- Chairperson, Joint Committee on the Judiciary
- House Committee on Ethics

For the 2023-24 Session, Day sat on the following committees in the House:

- Chairperson, Joint Committee on the Judiciary
- House Committee on Operations, Facilities and Security
- Special Joint Committee on Initiative Petitions

For the 2021-22 Session, Day sat on the following committees in the House:

- Chairperson, Joint Committee on the Judiciary
- House Committee on Operations, Facilities and Security

For the 2019-20 Session, Day sat on the following committees in the House:

- Vice Chair, Joint Committee on the Judiciary
- House Committee on Personnel and Administration
- House Committee on Post Audit and Oversight
- Joint Committee on Economic Development and Emerging Technologies

For the 2017-18 Session, Day sat on the following committees in the House:

- Vice Chair, House Committee on Personnel and Administration
- House Committee on Post Audit and Oversight
- Joint Committee on Financial Services
- Joint Committee on Mental Health, Substance Use and Recovery
- Joint Committee on the Judiciary

For the 2015-16 Session, Day sat on the following committees in the House:

- House Committee on Post Audit and Oversight
- Joint Committee on Education
- Joint Committee on Mental Health and Substance Abuse
- Joint Committee on the Judiciary

== Electoral history ==
Massachusetts 31st Middlesex General Election, 2022
Party	Candidate	Votes	%
Democratic	Michael Seamus Day	12,527	70.9
Independent	Theodore Christos Menounos	5,079	28.7
Write-in		66	0.4
Total votes		17,672	100.0

Massachusetts 31st Middlesex General Election, 2020
Party	Candidate	Votes	%
Democratic	Michael Seamus Day	17,479	71.4
Independent	Elizabeth R. Harrah	6,921	28.3
Write-in		82	0.3
Total votes		24,482	100.0

Massachusetts 31st Middlesex General Election, 2018
Party	Candidate	Votes	%
Democratic	Michael Seamus Day	13,000	59.4
Republican	Caroline Colarusso	8,195	37.4
Independent	Kateen R. Kumar	692	3.2
Write-in		9	0
Total votes		21,887	100.0

Massachusetts 31st Middlesex General Election, 2016
Party	Candidate	Votes	%
Democratic	Michael Seamus Day	14,528	58.8
Republican	Caroline Colarusso	10,163	41.1
Write-in		9	0
Total votes		24,700	100.0

Massachusetts 31st Middlesex General Election, 2014
Party	Candidate	Votes	%
Democratic	Michael Seamus Day	9,270	51.4
Republican	Caroline Colarusso	8,759	48.6
Write-in		2	0
Total votes		18,031	100.0

Massachusetts 31st Middlesex State Representative Democratic Primary, 2014
Party	Candidate	Votes	%
Democratic	Michael Seamus Day	2,941	56.9
Democratic	Michael Bettencourt	2,226	43.1
Write-in		2	0
Total votes		5,169	100.0

Massachusetts Middlesex and Essex State Senate Democratic Primary, 2010
Party	Candidate	Votes	%
Democratic	Katherine Clark	8,475	63.8
Democratic	Michael Seamus Day	4,774	35.9
Write-in		38	0.3
Total votes		13,287	100.0

== See also ==
- 2019–2020 Massachusetts legislature
- 2021–2022 Massachusetts legislature
