= Meghan Kilcoyne =

American politician

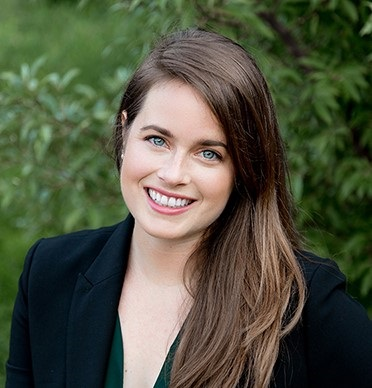

Member of the Massachusetts House of Representatives from the 12th Worcester district
- Incumbent
- Assumed office January 3, 2021
- Preceded by: Harold Naughton Jr.

Personal details
- Born: Massachusetts
- Party: Democratic
- Education: Stonehill College, B.A. Suffolk Law School, J.D.
- Website: https://www.repkilcoyne.com

Meghan K. Kilcoyne is an American politician who represents the 12th Worcester district in the Massachusetts House of Representatives. A member of the Democratic Party, her district encompasses the towns of Berlin, Boylston, Clinton, Lancaster, and Sterling, and part of the town of Northborough.

== Early life and education ==
Kilcoyne grew up in Sterling, Massachusetts, where she attended Houghton Elementary School and Chocksett Middle School. She graduated from Wachusett Regional High School and Stonehill College, where she earned a Bachelor of Arts in history. She later earned a Juris Doctor degree from Suffolk Law School.

== Political career ==
In 2020, Kilcoyne was elected to the Massachusetts House of Representatives, succeeding Harold Naughton Jr., for whom she had previously served as legislative director. She defeated two other candidates in the Democratic primary and Susan Smiley, the Republican nominee, in the general election. Kilcoyne was the first woman elected to the 12th Worcester district.

=== Committee Assignments ===
- Vice Chair, Joint Committee on Health Care Financing
- House Committee on Human Resources and Employee Engagement
- House Committee on Ways and Means
- Joint Committee on the Judiciary
- Joint Committee on Ways and Means

== See also ==
- 2021–2022 Massachusetts legislature
