= Bruce Ayers =

American politician (born 1962)

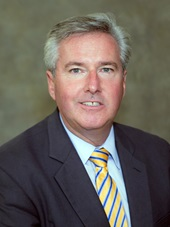

Member of the Massachusetts House of Representatives from the 1st Norfolk district
- Incumbent
- Assumed office January 4, 1999
- Preceded by: Michael G. Bellotti

Member of the Quincy City Council for Ward 6
- In office January 6, 1992 – January 3, 2000

Personal details
- Born: April 17, 1962 (age 64) Boston, Massachusetts
- Party: Democratic
- Education: Quincy College; Northeastern University; Harvard University; Boston College Small Business Development Program
- Occupation: Small Business Owner; Politician

Bruce J. Ayers (born April 17, 1962, in Boston, Massachusetts) is an American small business owner and politician who represents the 1st Norfolk District in the Massachusetts House of Representatives and is a former member of the Quincy, Massachusetts City Council (1992–2000).

== Education & Career ==
Ayers graduated North Quincy High School, while taking college courses at Quincy College. After high school he entered Northeastern University and then the Harvard University Extension School. Ayers has also completed the Boston College Small Business Development Program.

Ayers is a small business owner, and retrofits vehicles for the physically challenged with adaptive driving equipment. He has owned Ayers Handicap Conversion Center for over 35 years.

Ayers served on the Quincy Democratic City Committee from 1990 to 2000. In 1992 he was elected to the Quincy City Council for Ward 6. Ayers served in both positions until being elected to the 1st Norfolk State Representative district in 1999.

== Issues ==
Ayers has been an advocate for the physically disabled in the state legislature. In 2016, he filed legislation to end illegal use of handicapped parking spots.

In 2013 Ayers spoke to the need for additional laws to stop animal abuse following the highly publicized death of "Puppy Doe". It involved a dog found dead and tortured in a park in Quincy, Massachusetts.

Ayers hosts a regular television show called Legislative Update with Rep. Bruce Ayers on Quincy public access TV. There he talks with local political leaders and speaks about the initiatives and bills he has supported.

== Electoral history ==
Massachusetts General Court 1st Norfolk District, 1998 Democratic Primary
Party	Candidate	Votes	%	±%
Democratic	Bruce J. Ayers	3,801	54.2	
Democratic	Lawrence F. Chretian	3,212	45.8	

Massachusetts General Court 1st Norfolk District, 1998
Party	Candidate	Votes	%	±%
Democratic	Bruce J. Ayers	10.139	99.3	

Massachusetts General Court 1st Norfolk District, 2000
Party	Candidate	Votes	%	±%
Democratic	Bruce J. Ayers	13,122	97.4	−1.9

Massachusetts General Court 1st Norfolk District, 2002
Party	Candidate	Votes	%	±%
Democratic	Bruce J. Ayers	10,117	99.3	+1.9

Massachusetts General Court 1st Norfolk District, 2004 Democratic Primary
Party	Candidate	Votes	%	±%
Democratic	Bruce J. Ayers	3,801	77.5	+22.2
Democratic	Paul J. Meoni	1,000	23.6	

Massachusetts General Court 1st Norfolk District, 2004
Party	Candidate	Votes	%	±%
Democratic	Bruce J. Ayers	12,681	77.5	−21.8
Republican	Marco Sandonato	3,659		

Massachusetts General Court 1st Norfolk District, 2006
Party	Candidate	Votes	%	±%
Democratic	Bruce J. Ayers	10,926	98.9	+21.4

Massachusetts General Court 1st Norfolk District, 2008
Party	Candidate	Votes	%	±%
Democratic	Bruce J. Ayers	14,352	98.8	−1.1

Massachusetts General Court 1st Norfolk District, 2010
Party	Candidate	Votes	%	±%
Democratic	Bruce J. Ayers	11,119	98.9	+.01

Massachusetts General Court 1st Norfolk District, 2012
Party	Candidate	Votes	%	±%
Democratic	Bruce J. Ayers	14,722	98.7	−.02

Massachusetts General Court 1st Norfolk District, 2014
Party	Candidate	Votes	%	±%
Democratic	Bruce J. Ayers	9,820	98.6	−.01

== See also ==
- 2019–2020 Massachusetts legislature
- 2021–2022 Massachusetts legislature
