= 2024 Massachusetts House of Representatives election =

- November 5, 2024

All 160 seats in the Massachusetts House of Representatives 81 seats needed for a majority
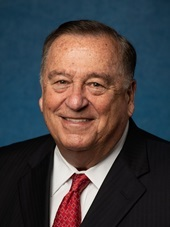

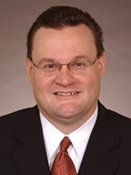

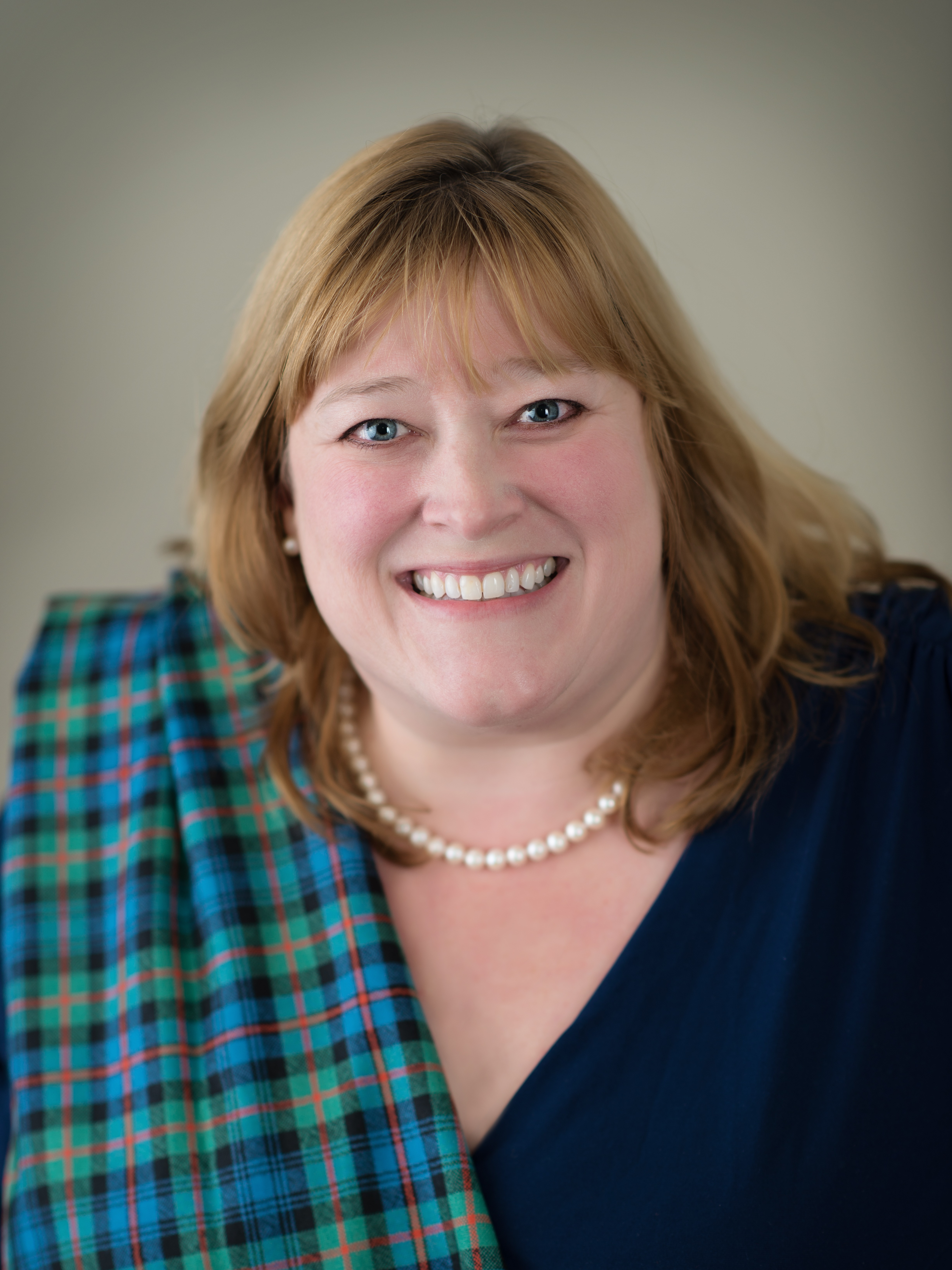
	Majority party	Minority party
Leader	Ron Mariano	Bradley Jones Jr.
Party	Democratic	Republican
Leader since	December 30, 2020	November 21, 2002
Leader's seat	3rd Norfolk	20th Middlesex
Last election	134 seats, 71.28%	25 seats, 25.60%
Seats after	134	25
Seat change	Steady	Steady
Popular vote	2,082,712	623,159
Percentage	73.00%	21.84%
	Third party
Leader	Susannah Whipps
Party	Independent
Leader's seat	2nd Franklin
Last election	1 seat, 1.69%
Seats after	1
Seat change	Steady
Popular vote	106,067
Percentage	3.72%
- Democratic gain Republican gain Democratic hold Republican hold Independent hold 30–40% 50–60% 60–70% 70–80% 80–90% >90% 40–50% 50–60% 60–70% 80–90% >90% 60–70%
Speaker before election
Ron Mariano
Democratic
Elected Speaker
Ron Mariano
Democratic

The 2024 Massachusetts House of Representatives election was held on Tuesday, November 5, 2024, with the primary election held on Tuesday, September 3, 2024. Massachusetts voters elected all 160 members of the State House to serve two-year terms in the Massachusetts General Court. The Democratic Party retained their majority in the chamber with no net change in seats. The election coincided with United States national elections and Massachusetts state elections, including U.S. Senate, U.S. House, U.S. President, and Massachusetts Senate.

== Retirements ==
Fourteen incumbents did not seek re-election.

=== Democrats ===
1. Barnstable, Dukes and Nantucket: Dylan Fernandes retired to run for State Senate.
2. 3rd Berkshire: William Pignatelli retired.
3. 8th Bristol: Paul Schmid retired.
4. 10th Bristol: William M. Straus retired.
5. 11th Essex: Peter Capano retired.
6. 2nd Hampshire: Daniel R. Carey retired to run for Hampshire County Clerk of Courts.
7. 11th Middlesex: Kay Khan retired.
8. 12th Middlesex: Ruth Balser retired.
9. 7th Norfolk: William Driscoll retired to run for State Senate.
10. 13th Norfolk: Denise Garlick retired.
11. 9th Plymouth: Gerard Cassidy retired.

=== Republicans ===
1. 1st Bristol: F. Jay Barrows retired.
2. 1st Plymouth: Matt Muratore retired to run for State Senate.
3. 8th Plymouth: Angelo D'Emilia retired.

== Resignation ==
Two seats were left vacant on the day of the general election due to resignations in 2024.

=== Democrats ===
1. 4th Barnstable: Sarah Peake resigned September 23 to become senior advisor for intergovernmental affairs to Governor Healey.
2. 6th Plymouth: Josh S. Cutler resigned February 4 to become Massachusetts' Undersecretary of Apprenticeship, Work-Based Learning, and Policy.

== Incumbents defeated ==
=== In primary election ===
Two incumbent representatives, one Democrat and one Republican, were defeated in the September 3 primary election.

==== Democrats ====
1. 18th Middlesex: Rady Mom lost renomination to Tara Hong.

==== Republicans ====
1. 2nd Plymouth: Susan Williams Gifford lost renomination to John Gaskey.

== Predictions ==
Source	Ranking	As of
Sabato's Crystal Ball	Safe D	October 23, 2024

== 2023–2024 special elections ==
Sources for special election results:

=== 2023 Special: 9th Suffolk ===
Primary Election Results
Party	Candidate	Votes	%
Democratic Party Primary Results
Democratic	John Francis Moran	1,758	86.26%
Democratic	Amparo Ortiz	280	13.74%
Total votes		2,038	100.00%
Republican Party Primary Results
Republican	Roy A. Owens (Note: The candidate ran a write-in campaign in this election.)	1	100.00%
Total votes		1	100.00%

General Election Results
Party	Candidate	Votes	%
Democratic	John Francis Moran	1,356	99.85%
Republican	Roy A. Owens	2	0.15%
Total votes		1,358	100.00%
Democratic hold			

=== 2023 Special: 10th Suffolk ===
Primary Election Results
Party	Candidate	Votes	%
Democratic Party Primary Results
Democratic	Bill MacGregor	3,261	43.68%
Democratic	Robert Patrick Orthman	2,391	32.03%
Democratic	Celia S. Segel	1,813	24.29%
Total votes		7,465	100.00%

General Election Results
Party	Candidate	Votes	%
Democratic	Bill MacGregor	2,579	96.30%
Democratic	Robert Patrick Orthman	99	3.70%
Total votes		2,678	100.00%
Democratic hold			

=== 2024 Special: 6th Worcester ===
Primary Election Results
Party	Candidate	Votes	%
Republican Party Primary Results
Republican	John J. Marsi, Jr	1,189	53.25%
Republican	David S. Adams	1,044	46.75%
Total votes		2,233	100.00%

General Election Results
Party	Candidate	Votes	%
Republican	John J. Marsi, Jr	4,511	96.82%
Republican	David S. Adams	110	2.36%
Democratic	Jeanne Renaud Costello	38	0.82%
Total votes		4,659	100.00%
Republican hold			

== Overview ==
=== Election ===
2024 Massachusetts House of Representatives election General election — November 5, 2024
Party	Votes	Percentage	Seats	+/–
Democratic	2,082,712	73.00	134	Steady
Republican	623,159	21.84	25	Steady
Workers Party	3,541	0.12	0	Steady
Pirate Party	2,802	0.09	0	Steady
Independents	106,067	3.72	1	Steady
Write-In	34,649	1.21	0	Steady
Valid votes	2,852,930	84.19	—	—
Invalid votes	657,554	15.81	—	—
Totals	3,510,484	100	160	—

Popular vote
Democratic	73.00%
Republican	21.84%
Independent	3.72%
Other	1.44%

Percentage seats won
Democratic	83.75%
Republican	15.63%
Independent	0.62%

== Summary of results by State House district ==
Italics denote an open seat held by the incumbent party; bold text denotes a gain for a party.

State House District	Incumbent	Party	Elected Representative	Party
1st Barnstable	Chris Flanagan	Dem	Chris Flanagan	Dem
2nd Barnstable	Kip Diggs	Dem	Kip Diggs	Dem
3rd Barnstable	David Vieira	Rep	David Vieira	Rep
4th Barnstable	Vacant (Note: Representative Sarah Peake (D) resigned on September 23, 2024.)		Hadley Luddy	Dem
5th Barnstable	Steven Xiarhos	Rep	Steven Xiarhos	Rep
Barnstable, Dukes and Nantucket	Dylan Fernandes	Dem	Thomas Moakley	Dem
1st Berkshire	John Barrett	Dem	John Barrett	Dem
2nd Berkshire	Tricia Farley-Bouvier	Dem	Tricia Farley-Bouvier	Dem
3rd Berkshire	William Pignatelli	Dem	Leigh Davis	Dem
1st Bristol	F. Jay Barrows	Rep	Michael Chaisson	Rep
2nd Bristol	James Hawkins	Dem	James Hawkins	Dem
3rd Bristol	Carol Doherty	Dem	Carol Doherty	Dem
4th Bristol	Steven Howitt	Rep	Steven Howitt	Rep
5th Bristol	Patricia Haddad	Dem	**Justin Thurber**	**Rep**
6th Bristol	Carole Fiola	Dem	Carole Fiola	Dem
7th Bristol	Alan Silvia	Dem	Alan Silvia	Dem
8th Bristol	Paul Schmid	Dem	Steven J. Ouellette	Dem
9th Bristol	Christopher Markey	Dem	Christopher Markey	Dem
10th Bristol	William Straus	Dem	Mark Sylvia	Dem
11th Bristol	Christopher Hendricks	Dem	Christopher Hendricks	Dem
12th Bristol	Norman Orrall	Rep	Norman Orrall	Rep
13th Bristol	Antonio Cabral	Dem	Antonio Cabral	Dem
14th Bristol	Adam Scanlon	Dem	Adam Scanlon	Dem
1st Essex	Dawne Shand	Dem	Dawne Shand	Dem
2nd Essex	Kristin Kassner (Note: Representative Kassner assumed office on February 3, 2023.) (Note: Previously Contested. Incumbent Leonard Mirra (R) was seated in January 2023 as a "hold-over" representative while a Special House Committee examined the vote returns for each candidate, which were certified in having Kristin Kassner (D) winning by 1 vote. The Special House Committee, in a 2-1 vote, decided in favor of Kristin Kassner.)	Dem	Kristin Kassner	Dem
3rd Essex	Andy Vargas	Dem	Andy Vargas	Dem
4th Essex	Estela Reyes	Dem	Estela Reyes	Dem
5th Essex	Ann-Margaret Ferrante	Dem	Ann-Margaret Ferrante	Dem
6th Essex	Jerry Parisella	Dem	Jerry Parisella	Dem
7th Essex	Manny Cruz	Dem	Manny Cruz	Dem
8th Essex	Jenny Armini	Dem	Jenny Armini	Dem
9th Essex	Donald Wong	Rep	Donald Wong	Rep
10th Essex	Dan Canhill	Dem	Dan Cahill	Dem
11th Essex	Peter Capano	Dem	Sean Reid	Dem
12th Essex	Thomas Walsh	Dem	Thomas Walsh	Dem
13th Essex	Sally Kerans	Dem	Sally Kerans	Dem
14th Essex	Adrianne Ramos	Dem	Adrianne Ramos	Dem
15th Essex	Ryan Hamilton	Dem	Ryan Hamilton	Dem
16th Essex	Francisco Paulino	Dem	Francisco E. Paulino	Dem
17th Essex	Frank Moran	Dem	Frank A. Moran	Dem
18th Essex	Tram Nguyen	Dem	Tram Nguyen	Dem
1st Franklin	Natalie Blais	Dem	Natalie Blais	Dem
2nd Franklin	Susannah Whipps	Ind	Susannah Whipps	Ind
1st Hampden	Todd Smola	Rep	Todd Smola	Rep
2nd Hampden	Brian Michael Ashe	Dem	Brian Ashe	Dem
3rd Hampden	Nicholas Boldyga	Rep	Nicholas Boldyga	Rep
4th Hampden	Kelly Pease	Rep	Kelly Pease	Rep
5th Hampden	Patricia Duffy	Dem	Patricia Duffy	Dem
6th Hampden	Michael Finn	Dem	Michael Finn	Dem
7th Hampden	Aaron Saunders	Dem	Aaron Saunders	Dem
8th Hampden	Shirley Arriaga	Dem	Shirley Arriaga	Dem
9th Hampden	Orlando Ramos	Dem	Orlando Ramos	Dem
10th Hampden	Carlos Gonzalez	Dem	Carlos González	Dem
11th Hampden	Bud Williams	Dem	Bud Williams	Dem
12th Hampden	Angelo Puppolo	Dem	Angelo Puppolo	Dem
1st Hampshire	Lindsay Sabadosa	Dem	Lindsay Sabadosa	Dem
2nd Hampshire	Daniel Carey	Dem	Homar Gomez	Dem
3rd Hampshire	Mindy Domb	Dem	Mindy Domb	Dem
1st Middlesex	Margaret Scarsdale (Note: Previously Contested. Vacant while a Special House Committee reviewed the vote returns for each candidate. The committee ruled in favor of Margaret Scarsdale (D). She assumed office on January 18, 2023.)	Dem	Margaret Scarsdale	Dem
2nd Middlesex	James Arciero	Dem	James Arciero	Dem
3rd Middlesex	Kate Hogan	Dem	Kate Hogan	Dem
4th Middlesex	Danielle Gregoire	Dem	Danielle Gregoire	Dem
5th Middlesex	David Linsky	Dem	David Linsky	Dem
6th Middlesex	Priscila Sousa	Dem	Priscila Sousa	Dem
7th Middlesex	Jack Patrick Lewis	Dem	Jack Patrick Lewis	Dem
8th Middlesex	James Arena-DeRosa	Dem	James Arena-DeRosa	Dem
9th Middlesex	Thomas Stanley	Dem	Thomas Stanley	Dem
10th Middlesex	John Lawn	Dem	John J. Lawn	Dem
11th Middlesex	Kay Khan	Dem	Mah Sangiolo	Dem
12th Middlesex	Ruth Balser	Dem	Greg Schwartz	Dem
13th Middlesex	Carmine Gentile	Dem	Carmine Gentile	Dem
14th Middlesex	Simon Cataldo	Dem	Simon Cataldo	Dem
15th Middlesex	Michelle Ciccolo	Dem	Michelle Ciccolo	Dem
16th Middlesex	Rodney Elliott	Dem	Rodney Elliott	Dem
17th Middlesex	Vanna Howard	Dem	Vanna Howard	Dem
18th Middlesex	Rady Mom	Dem	Tara Hong	Dem
19th Middlesex	David Robertson	Dem	Dave Robertson	Dem
20th Middlesex	Bradley Jones	Rep	Bradley Jones	Rep
21st Middlesex	Kenneth Gordon	Dem	Kenneth Gordon	Dem
22nd Middlesex	Marc Lombardo	Rep	Marc Lombardo	Rep
23rd Middlesex	Sean Garballey	Dem	Sean Garballey	Dem
24th Middlesex	David Rogers	Dem	David Rogers	Dem
25th Middlesex	Marjorie Decker	Dem	Marjorie Decker	Dem
26th Middlesex	Mike Connolly	Dem	Mike Connolly	Dem
27th Middlesex	Erika Uyterhoeven	Dem	Erika Uyterhoeven	Dem
28th Middlesex	Joseph McGonagle	Dem	Joseph McGonagle	Dem
29th Middlesex	Steven Owens	Dem	Steven Owens	Dem
30th Middlesex	Richard Haggerty	Dem	Richard Haggerty	Dem
31st Middlesex	Michael Seamus Day	Dem	Michael Seamus Day	Dem
32nd Middlesex	Kate Lipper-Garabedian	Dem	Kate Lipper-Garabedian	Dem
33rd Middlesex	Steven Ultrino	Dem	Steven Ultrino	Dem
34th Middlesex	Christine Barber	Dem	Christine Barber	Dem
35th Middlesex	Paul Donato	Dem	Paul Donato	Dem
36th Middlesex	Colleen Garry	Dem	Colleen Garry	Dem
37th Middlesex	Danillo Sena	Dem	Danillo Sena	Dem
1st Norfolk	Bruce Ayers	Dem	Bruce Ayers	Dem
2nd Norfolk	Tackey Chan	Dem	Tackey Chan	Dem
3rd Norfolk	Ronald Mariano	Dem	Ronald Mariano	Dem
4th Norfolk	James Murphy	Dem	James Murphy	Dem
5th Norfolk	Mark Cusack	Dem	Mark Cusack	Dem
6th Norfolk	William C. Galvin	Dem	William C. Galvin	Dem
7th Norfolk	William Driscoll	Dem	Richard Wells	Dem
8th Norfolk	Ted Philips	Dem	Ted Philips	Dem
9th Norfolk	Marcus Vaughn	Rep	Marcus Vaughn	Rep
10th Norfolk	Jeffrey Roy	Dem	Jeffrey Roy	Dem
11th Norfolk	Paul McMurtry	Dem	Paul McMurtry	Dem
12th Norfolk	John Rogers	Dem	John Rogers	Dem
13th Norfolk	Denise Garlick	Dem	Joshua Tarsky	Dem
14th Norfolk	Alice Peisch	Dem	Alice Peisch	Dem
15th Norfolk	Tommy Vitolo	Dem	Tommy Vitolo	Dem
1st Plymouth	Matthew Muratore	Rep	**Michelle Badger**	**Dem**
2nd Plymouth	Vacant (Note: Incumbent Susan Williams Gifford died on October 22.)		John Gaskey	Rep
3rd Plymouth	Joan Meschino	Dem	Joan Meschino	Dem
4th Plymouth	Patrick Kearney	Dem	Patrick Kearney	Dem
5th Plymouth	David DeCoste	Rep	David DeCoste	Rep
6th Plymouth	Vacant (Note: Representative Josh S. Cutler (D) resigned on February 4, 2024.)		**Kenneth Sweezey**	**Rep**
7th Plymouth	Alyson Sullivan-Almeida	Rep	Alyson Sullivan-Almeida	Rep
8th Plymouth	Angelo D'Emilia	Rep	**Dennis Gallagher**	Dem
9th Plymouth	Gerry Cassidy	Dem	Bridget Plouffe	Dem
10th Plymouth	Michelle DuBois	Dem	Michelle DuBois	Dem
11th Plymouth	Rita Mendes	Dem	Rita Mendes	Dem
12th Plymouth	Kathleen LaNatra	Dem	Kathleen LaNatra	Dem
1st Suffolk	Adrian Madaro	Dem	Adrian Madaro	Dem
2nd Suffolk	Daniel Ryan	Dem	Daniel Ryan	Dem
3rd Suffolk	Aaron Michlewitz	Dem	Aaron Michlewitz	Dem
4th Suffolk	David Biele	Dem	David Biele	Dem
5th Suffolk	Christopher Worrell	Dem	Christopher Worrell	Dem
6th Suffolk	Russell Holmes	Dem	Russell Holmes	Dem
7th Suffolk	Chynah Tyler	Dem	Chynah Tyler	Dem
8th Suffolk	Jay Livingstone	Dem	Jay Livingstone	Dem
9th Suffolk	John Moran (Note: Representative Jon Santiago resigned on March 1, 2023. John F. Moran won the subsequent special election and assumed office on June 8, 2023.)	Dem	John Moran	Dem
10th Suffolk	William MacGregor (Note: Representative Edward F. Coppinger resigned on February 28, 2023. Bill MacGregor won the subsequent special election and assumed office on June 8, 2023.)	Dem	William MacGregor	Dem
11th Suffolk	Judith García	Dem	Judith García	Dem
12th Suffolk	Brandy Fluker Oakley	Dem	Brandy Fluker Oakley	Dem
13th Suffolk	Daniel Hunt	Dem	Daniel Hunt	Dem
14th Suffolk	Rob Consalvo	Dem	Rob Consalvo	Dem
15th Suffolk	Samantha Montano	Dem	Samantha Montano	Dem
16th Suffolk	Jessica Ann Giannino	Dem	Jessica Ann Giannino	Dem
17th Suffolk	Kevin Honan	Dem	Kevin Honan	Dem
18th Suffolk	Michael Moran	Dem	Michael Moran	Dem
19th Suffolk	Jeffrey Turco	Dem	Jeffrey Turco	Dem
1st Worcester	Kimberly Ferguson	Rep	Kimberly Ferguson	Rep
2nd Worcester	Jonathan Zlotnik	Dem	Jonathan Zlotnik	Dem
3rd Worcester	Michael Kushmerek	Dem	Michael Kushmerek	Dem
4th Worcester	Natalie Higgins	Dem	Natalie Higgins	Dem
5th Worcester	Donald Berthiaume	Rep	Donald Berthiaume	Rep
6th Worcester	John Marsi (Note: Representative Peter Durant resigned on November 29, 2023. John Marsi won the subsequent special election and assumed office on March 27, 2024.)	Rep	John Marsi	Rep
7th Worcester	Paul Frost	Rep	Paul Frost	Rep
8th Worcester	Michael Soter	Rep	Michael Soter	Rep
9th Worcester	David Muradian	Rep	David Muradian	Rep
10th Worcester	Brian Murray	Dem	Brian Murray	Dem
11th Worcester	Hannah Kane	Rep	Hannah Kane	Rep
12th Worcester	Meghan Kilcoyne	Dem	Meghan Kilcoyne	Dem
13th Worcester	John Mahoney	Dem	John Mahoney	Dem
14th Worcester	James O'Day	Dem	James O'Day	Dem
15th Worcester	Mary Keefe	Dem	Mary Keefe	Dem
16th Worcester	Daniel Donahue	Dem	Daniel Donahue	Dem
17th Worcester	David LeBoeuf	Dem	David LeBoeuf	Dem
18th Worcester	Joseph McKenna	Rep	Joseph McKenna	Rep
19th Worcester	Kate Donaghue	Dem	Kate Donaghue	Dem

== Detailed results ==
Sources for election results:

=== 1st Barnstable ===
General Election Results
Party	Candidate	Votes	%
Democratic	Christopher Richard Flanagan	15,607	56.5%
Republican	Gerald Joseph O'Connell	11,996	43.4%
Write-in		35	0.1%
Total votes		25,966	100.00%

=== 2nd Barnstable ===
General Election Results
Party	Candidate	Votes	%
Democratic	Kip Diggs (incumbent)	14,147	59.3%
Republican	William Buffington Peters	9,686	40.6%
Write-in		31	0.1%
Total votes		23,864	100.00%

=== 3rd Barnstable ===
General Election Results
Party	Candidate	Votes	%
Republican	David T. Vieira (incumbent)	16,059	56%
Democratic	Kathleen Fox Alfano	12,600	43.9%
Write-in		16	0.1%
Total votes		28,675	100.00%

=== 4th Barnstable ===
General Election Results
Party	Candidate	Votes	%
Democratic	Hadley Luddy	22,749	98.7%
Write-in		303	1.3%
Total votes		23,052	100.00%

=== 5th Barnstable ===
General Election Results
Party	Candidate	Votes	%
Republican	Steven Xiarhos (incumbent)	16,384	61.3%
Democratic	Owen G. Fletcher	10,305	38.6%
Write-in		25	0.1%
Total votes		26,714	100.00%

=== Barnstable, Dukes and Nantucket ===
General Election Results
Party	Candidate	Votes	%
Democratic	Thomas Moakley	21,075	98.9%
Write-in		240	1.1%
Total votes		21,315	100.00%

=== 1st Berkshire ===
General Election Results
Party	Candidate	Votes	%
Democratic	John P. Barret III (incumbent)	17,785	99.3%
Write-in		131	0.7%
Total votes		17,916	100.00%

=== 2nd Berkshire ===
General Election Results
Party	Candidate	Votes	%
Democratic	Tricia Farley-Bouvier (incumbent)	15,896	99.1%
Write-in		141	0.9%
Total votes		16,037	100.00%

=== 3rd Berkshire ===
General Election Results
Party	Candidate	Votes	%
Democratic	Leigh Davis	13,819	57.4%
Independent	Marybeth F. Mitts	10,222	42.4%
Write-in		46	0.2%
Total votes		24,087	100.00%

=== 1st Bristol ===
General Election Results
Party	Candidate	Votes	%
Republican	Michael Chaisson	11,404	50.2%
Democratic	Kostas Loukos	11,316	49.8%
Write-in		15	0.1%
Total votes		22,735	100.00%

=== 2nd Bristol ===
General Election Results
Party	Candidate	Votes	%
Democratic	James K. Hawkins (incumbent)	12,769	68.1%
Workers Party	Andrew Nelson	3,540	18.9%
Independent	Patricia Bellfield	2,389	12.7%
Write-in		66	0.4%
Total votes		18,764	100.00%

=== 3rd Bristol ===
General Election Results
Party	Candidate	Votes	%
Democratic	Carol Doherty (incumbent)	15,398	98.4%
Write-in		245	1.6%
Total votes		15,643	100.00%

=== 4th Bristol ===
General Election Results
Party	Candidate	Votes	%
Republican	Steve Howitt (incumbent)	19,728	98.6%
Write-in		283	1.4%
Total votes		20,011	100.00%

=== 5th Bristol ===
General Election Results
Party	Candidate	Votes	%
Republican	Justin Thurber	12,390	51.4%
Democratic	Patricia Haddad (incumbent)	11,464	48%
Write-in		15	0.1%
Total votes		23,869	100.00%

=== 6th Bristol ===
General Election Results
Party	Candidate	Votes	%
Democratic	Carole Fiola (incumbent)	11,766	96.5%
Write-in		424	3.5%
Total votes		12,190	100.00%

=== 7th Bristol ===
General Election Results
Party	Candidate	Votes	%
Democratic	Alan Silvia (incumbent)	8,556	97%
Write-in		265	3%
Total votes		8,821	100.00%

=== 8th Bristol ===
General Election Results
Party	Candidate	Votes	%
Democratic	Steven Ouellette	7,497	33.8%
Republican	Christopher Thrasher	7,236	32.7%
Independent	Jesse St. W. Gelais	4.232	19.1%
Independent	Manuel Soares Jr.	2,003	9%
Independent	Laura A. Hadley	1,169	5.3%
Write-in		24	0.1%
Total votes		22,161	100.00%

=== 9th Bristol ===
General Election Results
Party	Candidate	Votes	%
Democratic	Christopher Markey (incumbent)	16,627	98.9%
Write-in		183	1.1%
Total votes		16,810	100.00%

=== 10th Bristol ===
General Election Results
Party	Candidate	Votes	%
Democratic	Mark Sylvia	13,663	52.6%
Republican	Joseph M. Pires	12,295	47.3%
Write-in		23	0.1%
Total votes		25,981	100.00%

=== 11th Bristol ===
General Election Results
Party	Candidate	Votes	%
Democratic	Christopher Hendricks (incumbent)	8,940	96.4%
Write-in		334	3.6%
Total votes		9,274	100.00%

=== 12th Bristol ===
General Election Results
Party	Candidate	Votes	%
Republican	Norman Orrall (incumbent)	18,757	98.7%
Write-in		238	1.3%
Total votes		18,995	100.00%

=== 13th Bristol ===
General Election Results
Party	Candidate	Votes	%
Democratic	Antonio Cabral (incumbent)	11,561	97%
Write-in		355	3%
Total votes		11,916	100.00%

=== 14th Bristol ===
General Election Results
Party	Candidate	Votes	%
Democratic	Adam Scanlon (incumbent)	12,478	55.9%
Republican	David Cannata Jr	9,823	44%
Write-in		4	0.1%
Total votes		22,305	100.00%

=== 1st Essex ===
General Election Results
Party	Candidate	Votes	%
Democratic	Dawne Shand	20,721	98.6%
Write-in		303	1.4%
Total votes		21,024	100.00%

=== 2nd Essex ===
General Election Results
Party	Candidate	Votes	%
Democratic	Kristin Kassner	16,063	54.2%
Republican	Mark T. Tashjian	13,562	45.7%
Write-in		19	0.1%
Total votes		29,644	100.00%

=== 3rd Essex ===
General Election Results
Party	Candidate	Votes	%
Democratic	Andy Vargas (incumbent)	14,198	99.4%
Write-in		86	0.6%
Total votes		14,284	100.00%

=== 4th Essex ===
General Election Results
Party	Candidate	Votes	%
Democratic	Estela Reyes	9,285	95.8%
Write-in		406	4.2%
Total votes		9,691	100.00%

=== 5th Essex ===
General Election Results
Party	Candidate	Votes	%
Democratic	Ann-Margaret Ferrante (incumbent)	17,877	66.5%
Independent	Steven G. Leblanc Jr.	8,926	33.2%
Write-in		69	0/3%
Total votes		26,872	100.00%

=== 6th Essex ===
General Election Results
Party	Candidate	Votes	%
Democratic	Jerry Parisella (incumbent)	16,598	71%
Republican	Ty Vitale	5,548	23.7%
Independent	Eupulio R. Marciano	1,216	5.2%
Write-in		11	0.1%
Total votes		14,666	100.00%
Democratic hold			

=== 7th Essex ===
General Election Results
Party	Candidate	Votes	%
Democratic	Manny Cruz	18,548	99.3%
Write-in		130	0.7%
Total votes		18,678	100.00%

=== 8th Essex ===
General Election Results
Party	Candidate	Votes	%
Democratic	Jenny Armini	18,643	98.5%
Write-in		293	11.5%
Total votes		18,936	100.00%

=== 9th Essex ===
General Election Results
Party	Candidate	Votes	%
Republican	Donald Wong (incumbent)	18,114	98.9%
Write-in		195	1.1%
Total votes		18,309	100.00%

=== 10th Essex ===
General Election Results
Party	Candidate	Votes	%
Democratic	Daniel Cahill (incumbent)	10,252	96.6%
Write-in		357	3.4%
Total votes		10,609	100.00%

=== 11th Essex ===
General Election Results
Party	Candidate	Votes	%
Democratic	Sean Reid	11,228	96.6%
Write-in		438	3.8%
Total votes		11,666	100.00%

=== 12th Essex ===
General Election Results
Party	Candidate	Votes	%
Democratic	Thomas P. Walsh (incumbent)	17,194	97.4%
Write-in		464	2.6%
Total votes		17,658	100.00%

=== 13th Essex ===
General Election Results
Party	Candidate	Votes	%
Democratic	Sally Kerans	17,194	97.4%
Write-in		464	2.6%
Total votes		17,658	100.00%

=== 14th Essex ===
General Election Results
Party	Candidate	Votes	%
Democratic	Adrianne Ramos	18,597	98.9%
Write-in		204	1.1%
Total votes		18,801	100.00%

=== 15th Essex ===
General Election Results
Party	Candidate	Votes	%
Democratic	Ryan M. Hamilton	16,571	97.4%
Write-in		449	2.6%
Total votes		17,020	100.00%

=== 16th Essex ===
General Election Results
Party	Candidate	Votes	%
Democratic	Francisco E. Paulino	10,187	95.4%
Write-in		493	4.6%
Total votes		10,680	100.00%

=== 17th Essex ===
General Election Results
Party	Candidate	Votes	%
Democratic	Frank A. Moran (incumbent)	9,870	97.6%
Write-in		242	2.4%
Total votes		10,112	100.00%

=== 18th Essex ===
General Election Results
Party	Candidate	Votes	%
Democratic	Tram Nguyen (incumbent)	18,998	98%
Write-in		394	2%
Total votes		19,392	100.00%

=== 1st Franklin ===
General Election Results
Party	Candidate	Votes	%
Democratic	Natalie Blais (incumbent)	20,997	99%
Write-in		214	1%
Total votes		21,211	100.00%

=== 2nd Franklin ===
General Election Results
Party	Candidate	Votes	%
Independent	Susannah Whipps (incumbent)	14,235	65.6%
Republican	Jeffrey L. Raymond	7,416	34.2%
Write-in		59	0.3%
Total votes		21,710	100.00%

=== 1st Hampden ===
General Election Results
Party	Candidate	Votes	%
Republican	Todd Smola (incumbent)	19,075	99.2%
Write-in		163	0.8%
Total votes		19,238	100.00%

=== 2nd Hampden ===
General Election Results
Party	Candidate	Votes	%
Democratic	Brian Ashe (incumbent)	18,841	97.8%
Write-in		419	2.2%
Total votes		19,260	100.00%

=== 3rd Hampden ===
General Election Results
Party	Candidate	Votes	%
Republican	Nicholas Boldyga (incumbent)	20,027	98.2%
Write-in		360	1.8%
Total votes		20,387	100.00%

=== 4th Hampden ===
General Election Results
Party	Candidate	Votes	%
Republican	Kelly Pease (incumbent)	12,894	58.8%
Democratic	Bridget Matthews-Kane	9,023	41.1%
Write-in		16	0.1%
Total votes		21,933	100.00%

=== 5th Hampden ===
General Election Results
Party	Candidate	Votes	%
Democratic	Patricia Duffy (incumbent)	12,368	99.5%
Write-in		64	0.5%
Total votes		12,432	100.00%

=== 6th Hampden ===
General Election Results
Party	Candidate	Votes	%
Democratic	Michael Finn (incumbent)	13,944	98.7%
Write-in		181	1.3%
Total votes		14,125	100.00%

=== 7th Hampden ===
General Election Results
Party	Candidate	Votes	%
Democratic	Aaron Saunders	18,235	99.2%
Write-in		153	0.8%
Total votes		18,388	100.00%

=== 8th Hampden ===
General Election Results
Party	Candidate	Votes	%
Democratic	Shirley Arriaga	14,977	96.5%
Write-in		538	3.5%
Total votes		15,515	100.00%

=== 9th Hampden ===
General Election Results
Party	Candidate	Votes	%
Democratic	Orlando Ramos (incumbent)	11,453	96.8%
Write-in		381	3.2%
Total votes		11,834	100.00%

=== 10th Hampden ===
General Election Results
Party	Candidate	Votes	%
Democratic	Carlos González (incumbent)	8,232	97.2%
Write-in		236	2.8%
Total votes		8,468	100.00%

=== 11th Hampden ===
General Election Results
Party	Candidate	Votes	%
Democratic	Bud Williams (incumbent)	10,664	96%
Write-in		449	4%
Total votes		11,113	100.00%

=== 12th Hampden ===
General Election Results
Party	Candidate	Votes	%
Democratic	Angelo Puppolo (incumbent)	18,571	97.8%
Write-in		418	2.2%
Total votes		18,989	100.00%

=== 1st Hampshire ===
General Election Results
Party	Candidate	Votes	%
Democratic	Lindsay Sabadosa (incumbent)	21,348	98.7%
Write-in		275	1.3%
Total votes		21,623	100.00%

=== 2nd Hampshire ===
General Election Results
Party	Candidate	Votes	%
Democratic	Homar Gomez	19,102	99.5%
Write-in		93	0.5%
Total votes		19,195	100.00%

=== 3rd Hampshire ===
General Election Results
Party	Candidate	Votes	%
Democratic	Mindy Domb (incumbent)	10,536	98.8%
Write-in		132	1.2%
Total votes		10,668	100.00%

=== 1st Middlesex ===
General Election Results
Party	Candidate	Votes	%
Democratic	Margaret Scarsdale	13,545	51.3%
Republican	Lynne E. Archambault	12,833	48.6%
Write-in		20	0.1%
Total votes		26,398	100.00%

=== 2nd Middlesex ===
General Election Results
Party	Candidate	Votes	%
Democratic	James Arciero (incumbent)	19,607	98.2%
Write-in		351	1.8%
Total votes		19,958	100.00%

=== 3rd Middlesex ===
General Election Results
Party	Candidate	Votes	%
Democratic	Kate Hogan (incumbent)	20,537	98.9%
Write-in		219	1.1%
Total votes		20,756	100.00%

=== 4th Middlesex ===
General Election Results
Party	Candidate	Votes	%
Democratic	Danielle Gregoire (incumbent)	13,921	98.6%
Write-in		194	1.4%
Total votes		14,115	100.00%

=== 5th Middlesex ===
General Election Results
Party	Candidate	Votes	%
Democratic	David Linsky (incumbent)	19,141	99%
Write-in		202	1%
Total votes		19,343	100.00%

=== 6th Middlesex ===
General Election Results
Party	Candidate	Votes	%
Democratic	Priscila Sousa	9,374	96.8%
Write-in		306	3.2%
Total votes		9,680	100.00%

=== 7th Middlesex ===
General Election Results
Party	Candidate	Votes	%
Democratic	Jack Patrick Lewis (incumbent)	17,674	98.6%
Write-in		249	1.4%
Total votes		17,923	100.00%

=== 8th Middlesex ===
General Election Results
Party	Candidate	Votes	%
Democratic	James Arena-DeRosa	20,170	98.2%
Write-in		366	1.8%
Total votes		20,536	100.00%

=== 9th Middlesex ===
General Election Results
Party	Candidate	Votes	%
Democratic	Thomas M. Stanley (incumbent)	13,465	72.7%
Republican	Carly Marie Downs	3,829	20.7%
Independent	Sean Diamond	1,219	6.6%
Total votes		18,513	100.00%

=== 10th Middlesex ===
General Election Results
Party	Candidate	Votes	%
Democratic	John J. Lawn (incumbent)	13,208	99.4%
Write-in		86	0.6%
Total votes		13,294	100.00%

=== 11th Middlesex ===
General Election Results
Party	Candidate	Votes	%
Democratic	Amy Mah Sangiolo	16,719	81.1%
Republican	Vladislav S. Yanovsky	3,853	18.7%
Write-in		47	0.2%
Total votes		20,619	100.00%

=== 12th Middlesex ===
General Election Results
Party	Candidate	Votes	%
Democratic	Greg Schwartz	18,410	98.4%
Write-in		305	1.6%
Total votes		18,715	100.00%

=== 13th Middlesex ===
General Election Results
Party	Candidate	Votes	%
Democratic	Carmine Gentile (incumbent)	18,547	73.5%
Republican	Virginia A. Gardner	6,667	26.4%
Write-in		24	0.1%
Total votes		25,238	100.00%

=== 14th Middlesex ===
General Election Results
Party	Candidate	Votes	%
Democratic	Simon Cataldo	20,084	98.8%
Write-in		249	1.2%
Total votes		20,333	100.00%

=== 15th Middlesex ===
General Election Results
Party	Candidate	Votes	%
Democratic	Michelle Ciccolo (incumbent)	17,682	99%
Write-in		177	1%
Total votes		17,859	100.00%

=== 16th Middlesex ===
General Election Results
Party	Candidate	Votes	%
Democratic	Rodney M. Elliott	12,892	96.7%
Write-in		446	3.3%
Total votes		13,338	100.00%

=== 17th Middlesex ===
General Election Results
Party	Candidate	Votes	%
Democratic	Vanna Howard (incumbent)	9,855	76.6%
Pirate	Joseph Paul Onoroski	2,802	21.8%
Write-in		202	1.6%
Total votes		12,859	100.00%

=== 18th Middlesex ===
General Election Results
Party	Candidate	Votes	%
Democratic	Tara Hong	7,592	77.7%
Independent	David Michael Ouellette	2,100	21.5%
Total votes		9,775	100.00%

=== 19th Middlesex ===
General Election Results
Party	Candidate	Votes	%
Democratic	David A. Robertson (incumbent)	12,560	52.5%
Republican	Paul Sarnowski	9,280	38.8%
Independent	George Hugh Ferdinand	2,029	8.5%
Write-in		33	0.1%
Total votes		23,902	100.00%

=== 20th Middlesex ===
General Election Results
Party	Candidate	Votes	%
Republican	Bradley Jones Jr. (incumbent)	21,140	99.6%
Write-in		92	0.4%
Total votes		21,232	100.00%

=== 21st Middlesex ===
General Election Results
Party	Candidate	Votes	%
Democratic	Kenneth I. Gordon (incumbent)	17,829	97.5%
Write-in		457	2.5%
Total votes		18,286	100.00%

=== 22nd Middlesex ===
General Election Results
Party	Candidate	Votes	%
Republican	Marc Lombardo (incumbent)	13,303	60.2%
Independent	George John Simolaris Jr.	8,461	38.3%
Write-in		328	1.5%
Total votes		22,092	100.00%

=== 23rd Middlesex ===
General Election Results
Party	Candidate	Votes	%
Democratic	Sean Garballey (incumbent)	20,994	99%
Write-in		203	1%
Total votes		21,197	100.00%

=== 24th Middlesex ===
General Election Results
Party	Candidate	Votes	%
Democratic	David M. Rogers (incumbent)	19,562	99.5%
Write-in		98	0.5%
Total votes		19,660	100.00%

=== 25th Middlesex ===
General Election Results
Party	Candidate	Votes	%
Democratic	Marjorie Decker (incumbent)	13,724	96.8%
Democratic	Evan Mackay (write-in)	350	2.5%
Write-in		99	0.7%
Total votes		14,173	100.00%

=== 26th Middlesex ===
General Election Results
Party	Candidate	Votes	%
Democratic	Mike Connolly (incumbent)	17,063	98.9%
Write-in		197	1.1%
Total votes		17,260	100.00%

=== 27th Middlesex ===
General Election Results
Party	Candidate	Votes	%
Democratic	Erika Uyterhoeven (incumbent)	20,475	98%
Write-in		413	2%
Total votes		20,888	100.00%

=== 28th Middlesex ===
General Election Results
Party	Candidate	Votes	%
Democratic	Joe McGonagle (incumbent)	8,414	96%
Write-in		350	4%
Total votes		8,764	100.00%

=== 29th Middlesex ===
General Election Results
Party	Candidate	Votes	%
Democratic	Steven Owens (incumbent)	19,006	99.6%
Write-in		68	0.4%
Total votes		19,074	100.00%

=== 30th Middlesex ===
General Election Results
Party	Candidate	Votes	%
Democratic	Richard Haggerty (incumbent)	17,200	99.7%
Write-in		53	0.3%
Total votes		17,253	100.00%

=== 31st Middlesex ===
General Election Results
Party	Candidate	Votes	%
Democratic	Michael S. Day (incumbent)	16,753	99.1%
Write-in		157	0.9%
Total votes		16,910	100.00%

=== 32nd Middlesex ===
General Election Results
Party	Candidate	Votes	%
Democratic	Kate Lipper-Garabedian (incumbent)	18,316	98%
Write-in		373	2%
Total votes		18,689	100.00%

=== 33rd Middlesex ===
General Election Results
Party	Candidate	Votes	%
Democratic	Steven Ultrino (incumbent)	11,360	97.2%
Write-in		330	2.8%
Total votes		11,690	100.00%

=== 34th Middlesex ===
General Election Results
Party	Candidate	Votes	%
Democratic	Christine Barber (incumbent)	16,020	98%
Write-in		320	2%
Total votes		16,340	100.00%

=== 35th Middlesex ===
General Election Results
Party	Candidate	Votes	%
Democratic	Paul Donato (incumbent)	14,995	96.8%
Write-in		494	3.2%
Total votes		15,489	100.00%

=== 36th Middlesex ===
General Election Results
Party	Candidate	Votes	%
Democratic	Colleen Garry (incumbent)	18,321	100%
Total votes		18,321	100.00%

=== 37th Middlesex ===
General Election Results
Party	Candidate	Votes	%
Democratic	Danillo Sena (incumbent)	18,789	98.7%
Write-in		251	1.3%
Total votes		19,040	100.00%

=== 1st Norfolk ===
General Election Results
Party	Candidate	Votes	%
Democratic	Bruce J. Ayers (incumbent)	15,517	98%
Write-in		321	2%
Total votes		15,838	100.00%

=== 2nd Norfolk ===
General Election Results
Party	Candidate	Votes	%
Democratic	Tackey Chan (incumbent)	12,919	69.4%
Republican	Sharon Marie Cintolo	5,650	30.3%
Write-in		51	0.3%
Total votes		18,620	100.00%

=== 3rd Norfolk ===
General Election Results
Party	Candidate	Votes	%
Democratic	Ron Mariano (incumbent)	14,559	97.4%
Write-in		386	2.6%
Total votes		14,945	100.00%

=== 4th Norfolk ===
General Election Results
Party	Candidate	Votes	%
Democratic	James M. Murphy (incumbent)	17,165	97.9%
Write-in		367	2.1%
Total votes		17,532	100.00%

=== 5th Norfolk ===
General Election Results
Party	Candidate	Votes	%
Democratic	Mark Cusack (incumbent)	16,139	97.5%
Write-in		416	2.5%
Total votes		16,555	100.00%

=== 6th Norfolk ===
General Election Results
Party	Candidate	Votes	%
Democratic	William C. Galvin (incumbent)	17,933	99.1%
Write-in		171	0.9%
Total votes		18,104	100.00%

=== 7th Norfolk ===
General Election Results
Party	Candidate	Votes	%
Democratic	Richard Wells	13,379	64.5%
Independent	Clinton Graham	7,249	34.9%
Write-in		115	0.6%
Total votes		20,743	100.00%

=== 8th Norfolk ===
General Election Results
Party	Candidate	Votes	%
Democratic	Ted Philips (incumbent)	18,161	98.5%
Write-in		268	1.5%
Total votes		18,429	100.00%

=== 9th Norfolk ===
General Election Results
Party	Candidate	Votes	%
Republican	Marcus Vaughn	15,244	57.4%
Democratic	Kevin Kalkut	11,309	42.6%
Write-in		15	0.1%
Total votes		26,568	100.00%

=== 10th Norfolk ===
General Election Results
Party	Candidate	Votes	%
Democratic	Jeffrey Roy (incumbent)	15,597	61.7%
Republican	Charles F. Bailey, III	9,653	38.2%
Write-in		19	0.1%
Total votes		25,269	100.00%

=== 11th Norfolk ===
General Election Results
Party	Candidate	Votes	%
Democratic	Paul McMurtry (incumbent)	16,431	60%
Independent	Andrew M. Pepoli	7,697	31.8%
Write-in		41	0.2%
Total votes		24,169	100.00%

=== 12th Norfolk ===
General Election Results
Party	Candidate	Votes	%
Democratic	John H. Rogers (incumbent)	17,443	98.2%
Write-in		323	1.8%
Total votes		17,766	100.00%

=== 13th Norfolk ===
General Election Results
Party	Candidate	Votes	%
Democratic	Joshua Tarsky	15,180	61.2%
Independent	William R. Dermody	9,520	38.4%
Write-in		108	0.4%
Total votes		24,808	100.00%

=== 14th Norfolk ===
General Election Results
Party	Candidate	Votes	%
Democratic	Alice Peisch (incumbent)	17,364	99.2%
Write-in		145	0.8%
Total votes		17,509	100.00%

=== 15th Norfolk ===
General Election Results
Party	Candidate	Votes	%
Democratic	Tommy Vitolo (incumbent)	16,140	98.6%
Write-in		226	1.4%
Total votes		16,366	100.00%

=== 1st Plymouth ===
General Election Results
Party	Candidate	Votes	%
Democratic	Michelle Badger	15,277	52.2%
Republican	Jesse G. Brown	13,952	47.7%
Write-in		11	0.1%
Total votes		29,240	100.00%

=== 2nd Plymouth ===
General Election Results
Party	Candidate	Votes	%
Republican	John Gaskey	16,996	88.6%
Democratic	Sarah G. Hewins (write-in)	2,097	10.9%
Write-in		95	0.5%
Total votes		19,188	100.00%

=== 3rd Plymouth ===
General Election Results
Party	Candidate	Votes	%
Democratic	Joan Meschino (incumbent)	20,424	98.4%
Write-in		341	1.6%
Total votes		20,765	100.00%

=== 4th Plymouth ===
General Election Results
Party	Candidate	Votes	%
Democratic	Patrick J. Kearney (incumbent)	22,528	99.6%
Write-in		101	0.4%
Total votes		22,629	100.00%

=== 5th Plymouth ===
General Election Results
Party	Candidate	Votes	%
Republican	David DeCoste (incumbent)	19,410	97.7%
Write-in		449	2.3%
Total votes		19,859	100.00%

=== 6th Plymouth ===
General Election Results
Party	Candidate	Votes	%
Republican	Kenneth Sweezey	14,908	52.9%
Democratic	Rebecca W. Coletta	13,234	47%
Total votes		28,166	100.00%

=== 7th Plymouth ===
General Election Results
Party	Candidate	Votes	%
Republican	Alyson Sullivan (incumbent)	18,565	98.8%
Write-in		229	1.2%
Total votes		18,794	100.00%

=== 8th Plymouth ===
General Election Results
Party	Candidate	Votes	%
Democratic	Dennis Gallagher	10,971	50.5%
Republican	Sandra M. Wright	10,749	49.5%
Write-in		6	0.1%
Total votes		21,726	100.00%

=== 9th Plymouth ===
General Election Results
Party	Candidate	Votes	%
Democratic	Bridget Plouffe	11,809	54.3%
Republican	Lawrence P. Novak	6,539	30.1%
Independent	Jonathan Wilshire Gill	3,398	15.6%
Total votes		21,754	100.00%

=== 10th Plymouth ===
General Election Results
Party	Candidate	Votes	%
Democratic	Michelle DuBois (incumbent)	12,409	99.8%
Write-in		29	0.2%
Total votes		12,438	100.00%

=== 11th Plymouth ===
General Election Results
Party	Candidate	Votes	%
Democratic	Rita Mendes	9,711	99.7%
Write-in		29	0.3%
Total votes		9,740	100.00%

=== 12th Plymouth ===
General Election Results
Party	Candidate	Votes	%
Democratic	Kathleen LaNatra (incumbent)	14,462	53.1%
Republican	Eric J. Meschino	12,754	46.8%
Write-in		11	0.1%
Total votes		27,227	100.00%

=== 1st Suffolk ===
General Election Results
Party	Candidate	Votes	%
Democratic	Adrian Madaro (incumbent)	11,326	97.1%
Write-in		342	2.9%
Total votes		11,668	100.00%

=== 2nd Suffolk ===
General Election Results
Party	Candidate	Votes	%
Democratic	Daniel Joseph Ryan (incumbent)	12,625	98.1%
Write-in		246	1.9%
Total votes		12,871	100.00%

=== 3rd Suffolk ===
General Election Results
Party	Candidate	Votes	%
Democratic	Aaron Michlewitz (incumbent)	13,660	98.2%
Write-in		254	1.8%
Total votes		13,914	100.00%

=== 4th Suffolk ===
General Election Results
Party	Candidate	Votes	%
Democratic	David Biele (incumbent)	17,916	97.9%
Write-in		393	2.1%
Total votes		18,309	100.00%

=== 5th Suffolk ===
General Election Results
Party	Candidate	Votes	%
Democratic	Christopher J. Worrell	10,588	97.6%
Write-in		256	2.4%
Total votes		10,844	100.00%

=== 6th Suffolk ===
General Election Results
Party	Candidate	Votes	%
Democratic	Russell Holmes (incumbent)	12,435	97.6%
Write-in		307	2.4%
Total votes		12,742	100.00%

=== 7th Suffolk ===
General Election Results
Party	Candidate	Votes	%
Democratic	Chynah Tyler (incumbent)	8,419	97.9%
Write-in		182	2.1%
Total votes		8,601	100.00%

=== 8th Suffolk ===
General Election Results
Party	Candidate	Votes	%
Democratic	Jay Livingstone (incumbent)	13,445	98.5%
Write-in		211	1.5%
Total votes		13,656	100.00%

=== 9th Suffolk ===
General Election Results
Party	Candidate	Votes	%
Democratic	John F. Moran	12,852	82.2%
Republican	Roy A. Owens	2,734	17.5%
Write-in		51	0.3%
Total votes		15,637	100.00%

=== 10th Suffolk ===
General Election Results
Party	Candidate	Votes	%
Democratic	Bill MacGregor	19,206	98.3%
Write-in		338	1.7%
Total votes		19,544	100.00%

=== 11th Suffolk ===
General Election Results
Party	Candidate	Votes	%
Democratic	Judith García	7,194	99.6%
Write-in		32	0.4%
Total votes		7,226	100.00%

=== 12th Suffolk ===
General Election Results
Party	Candidate	Votes	%
Democratic	Brandy Fluker Oakley (incumbent)	15,339	98.4%
Write-in		254	1.6%
Total votes		15,593	100.00%

=== 13th Suffolk ===
General Election Results
Party	Candidate	Votes	%
Democratic	Daniel J. Hunt (incumbent)	13,061	97.1%
Write-in		386	2.9%
Total votes		13,447	100.00%

=== 14th Suffolk ===
General Election Results
Party	Candidate	Votes	%
Democratic	Robert Consalvo (incumbent)	16,754	97.9%
Write-in		352	2.1%
Total votes		17,106	100.00%

=== 15th Suffolk ===
General Election Results
Party	Candidate	Votes	%
Democratic	Sam Montaño	16,450	98.7%
Write-in		225	1.3%
Total votes		16,675	100.00%

=== 16th Suffolk ===
General Election Results
Party	Candidate	Votes	%
Democratic	Jessica Giannino (incumbent)	9,141	96.8%
Write-in		302	3.2%
Total votes		9,443	100.00%

=== 17th Suffolk ===
General Election Results
Party	Candidate	Votes	%
Democratic	Kevin Honan (incumbent)	13,833	98.3%
Write-in		245	1.7%
Total votes		14,078	100.00%

=== 18th Suffolk ===
General Election Results
Party	Candidate	Votes	%
Democratic	Michael J. Moran (incumbent)	9,149	97.9%
Write-in		196	2.1%
Total votes		9,345	100.00%

=== 19th Suffolk ===
General Election Results
Party	Candidate	Votes	%
Democratic	Jeffrey Turco (incumbent)	11,919	96.7%
Write-in		412	3.3%
Total votes		12,331	100.00%

=== 1st Worcester ===
General Election Results
Party	Candidate	Votes	%
Republican	Kimberly Ferguson	18,371	69.7%
Independent	Anthony L. Ferrante	7,945	30.2%
Total votes		26,344	100.00%

=== 2nd Worcester ===
General Election Results
Party	Candidate	Votes	%
Democratic	Jonathan Zlotnik (incumbent)	10,812	52.2%
Republican	Bruce K. Chester	9,882	47.7%
Write-in		25	0.1%
Total votes		20,719	100.00%

=== 3rd Worcester ===
General Election Results
Party	Candidate	Votes	%
Democratic	Mike Kushmerek (incumbent)	13,098	96.5%
Write-in		475	3.5%
Total votes		13,573	100.00%

=== 4th Worcester ===
General Election Results
Party	Candidate	Votes	%
Democratic	Natalie Higgins (incumbent)	11,390	57.5%
Republican	Salvatore Perla	8,418	42.5%
Write-in		2	0.1%
Total votes		19,810	100.00%

=== 5th Worcester ===
General Election Results
Party	Candidate	Votes	%
Republican	Donnie Berthiaume (incumbent)	20,333	98.8%
Write-in		249	1.2%
Total votes		20,582	100.00%

=== 6th Worcester ===
General Election Results
Party	Candidate	Votes	%
Republican	John Marsi	12,440	61.8%
Democratic	Jeanne Costello	7,647	38%
Write-in		30	0.1%
Total votes		20,117	100.00%

=== 7th Worcester ===
General Election Results
Party	Candidate	Votes	%
Republican	Paul Frost (incumbent)	16,472	69.1%
Independent	Terry Burke Dotson	7,325	30.7%
Write-in		58	0.2%
Total votes		23,855	100.00%

=== 8th Worcester ===
General Election Results
Party	Candidate	Votes	%
Republican	Michael Soter (incumbent)	20,054	98.4%
Write-in		328	1.6%
Total votes		20,382	100.00%

=== 9th Worcester ===
General Election Results
Party	Candidate	Votes	%
Republican	David Muradian (incumbent)	19,799	98.5%
Write-in		298	1.5%
Total votes		20,097	100.00%

=== 10th Worcester ===
General Election Results
Party	Candidate	Votes	%
Democratic	Brian William Murray (incumbent)	15,108	97.3%
Write-in		425	2.7%
Total votes		15,533	100.00%

=== 11th Worcester ===
General Election Results
Party	Candidate	Votes	%
Republican	Hannah E. Kane (incumbent)	16,393	98.9%
Write-in		178	1.1%
Total votes		16,571	100.00%

=== 12th Worcester ===
General Election Results
Party	Candidate	Votes	%
Democratic	Meghan Kilcoyne (incumbent)	18,684	97.7%
Write-in		445	2.3%
Total votes		19,129	100.00%

=== 13th Worcester ===
General Election Results
Party	Candidate	Votes	%
Democratic	John J. Mahoney (incumbent)	14,404	96.9%
Write-in		464	3.1%
Total votes		14,868	100.00%

=== 14th Worcester ===
General Election Results
Party	Candidate	Votes	%
Democratic	Jim O'Day (incumbent)	13,952	96.6%
Write-in		490	3.4%
Total votes		14,442	100.00%

=== 15th Worcester ===
General Election Results
Party	Candidate	Votes	%
Democratic	Mary Keefe (incumbent)	8,019	96.2%
Write-in		321	3.8%
Total votes		8,340	100.00%

=== 16th Worcester ===
General Election Results
Party	Candidate	Votes	%
Democratic	Dan Donahue (incumbent)	10,157	95.9%
Write-in		433	4.1%
Total votes		10,590	100.00%

=== 17th Worcester ===
General Election Results
Party	Candidate	Votes	%
Democratic	David LeBoeuf (incumbent)	9,882	95.4%
Write-in		477	4.6%
Total votes		10,359	100.00%

=== 18th Worcester ===
General Election Results
Party	Candidate	Votes	%
Republican	Joseph D. McKenna (incumbent)	20,544	98.9%
Write-in		220	1.1%
Total votes		20,764	100.00%

=== 19th Worcester ===
General Election Results
Party	Candidate	Votes	%
Democratic	Kate Donaghue	16,497	77.5%
Independent	Boyd Stewart Conklin	4,732	22.2%
Write-in		61	0.3%
Total votes		21,290	100.00%

== See also ==
- 2025–2026 Massachusetts legislature
- 2024 United States elections
- 2024 United States presidential election in Massachusetts
- 2024 United States Senate election in Massachusetts
- 2024 United States House of Representatives elections in Massachusetts
- 2024 Massachusetts Senate election
- 2021–2022 Massachusetts legislature
- 2023–2024 Massachusetts legislature
