= 2017–2018 Massachusetts legislature =

190th Massachusetts General Court

190th Massachusetts General Court
←	189th	191st	→

Overview
- Legislative body: General Court
- Term: January 4, 2017 – December 31, 2018
- Election: 2016 Massachusetts general election

Senate
- Members: 40
- President: Harriette L. Chandler
- Party control: Democrat

House
- Members: 160
- Speaker: Robert DeLeo
- Party control: Democrat

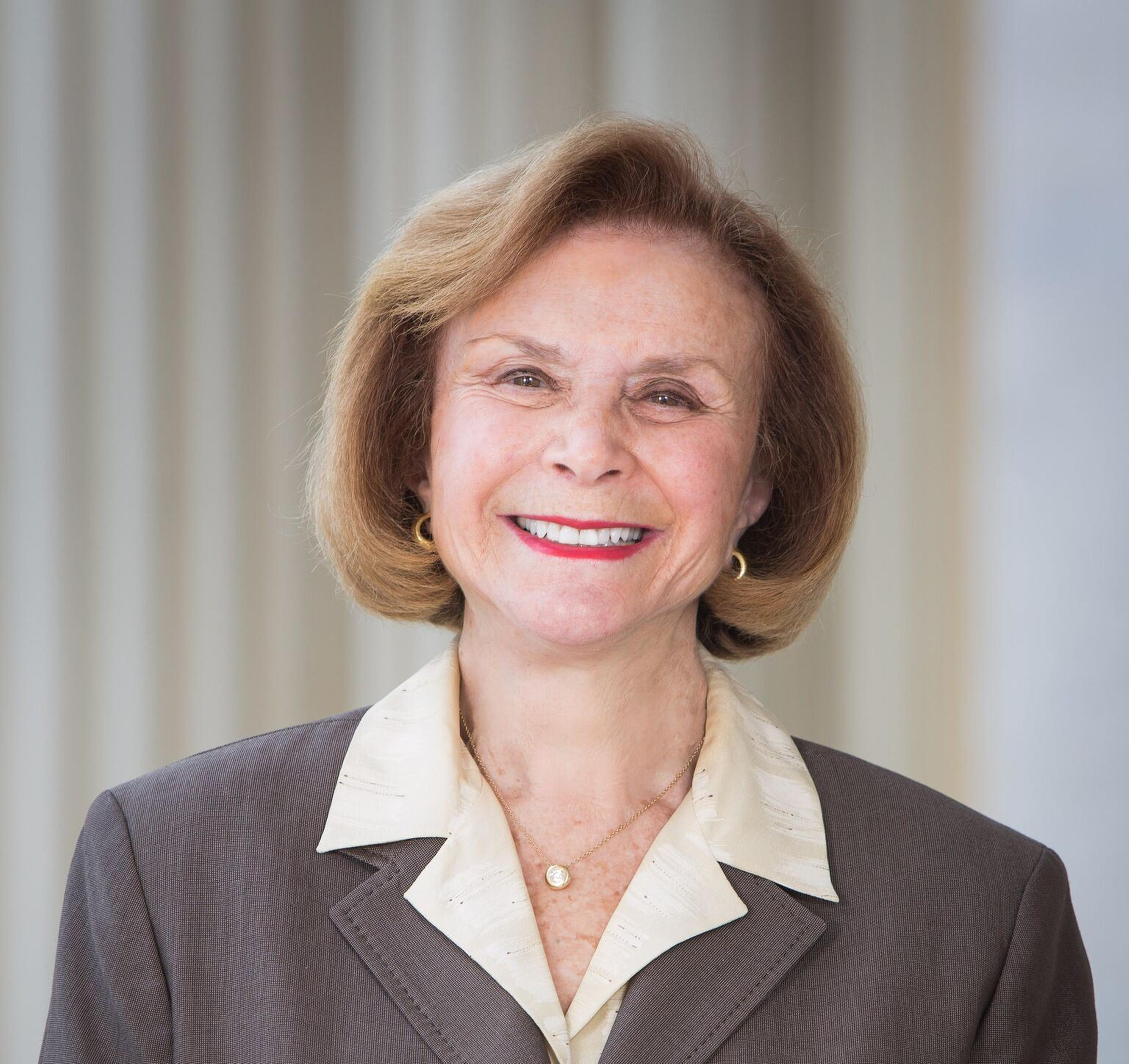
Harriette Chandler, Senate president.

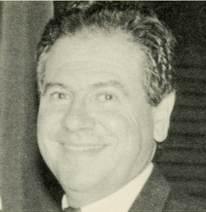
Robert DeLeo, House speaker.

Leaders of the Massachusetts General Court, 2017-2018.

The 190th Massachusetts General Court, consisting of the Massachusetts Senate and the Massachusetts House of Representatives, met in 2017 and 2018 during the governorship of Charlie Baker. Harriette L. Chandler served as president of the Senate, and Robert DeLeo served as speaker of the House.

== Senators ==
portrait	name	date of birth	district
	Michael J. Barrett	June 27, 1948	3rd Middlesex
	Joseph Boncore	June 27, 1983	
	Michael Brady (politician)		
	Will Brownsberger	March 21, 1957	
	Harriette L. Chandler	December 20, 1937	
	Sonia Chang-Díaz	March 31, 1978	
	Cynthia Stone Creem	September 17, 1942	
	Julian Cyr	January 19, 1986	
	Vinny deMacedo	October 16, 1965	
	Sal DiDomenico	June 20, 1971	
	Eileen Donoghue	1954	
	Jamie Eldridge	August 11, 1973	
	Ryan Fattman	July 1, 1984	
	Paul Feeney	March 23, 1978	
	Linda Dorcena Forry	November 1, 1973	
	Cindy Friedman		
	Anne Gobi	December 27, 1962	
	Adam G. Hinds		
	Donald Humason Jr.	July 31, 1967	
	Kathleen O'Connor Ives	July 1, 1977	
	Patricia D. Jehlen	October 14, 1943	
	John F. Keenan (state senator)	1964	
	Barbara L'Italien	January 3, 1961	
	Eric Lesser	February 27, 1985	
	Jason Lewis (Massachusetts politician)	April 19, 1968	
	Joan Lovely		
	Thomas M. McGee	December 15, 1955	
	Mark Montigny	June 20, 1961	
	Michael O. Moore	January 17, 1963	
	Patrick O'Connor (Massachusetts politician)	August 13, 1984	
	Marc Pacheco	October 29, 1952	
	Michael Rodrigues (politician)	May 30, 1959	
	Stan Rosenberg	October 12, 1949	
	Richard J. Ross	July 6, 1954	
	Mike Rush	November 30, 1973	
	Karen Spilka	January 11, 1953	
	Bruce Tarr	January 2, 1964	
	Walter Timilty	July 19, 1969	
	Dean Tran		
	James T. Welch	December 22, 1975	

== Representatives ==
portrait	name	date of birth	district
	James Arciero	August 27, 1974	2nd Middlesex
	Brian Ashe	April 23, 1963	
	Cory Atkins	February 10, 1949	
	Bruce Ayers	April 17, 1962	
	Ruth Balser	October 30, 1948	
	Christine Barber		
	F. Jay Barrows	April 5, 1956	
	Jennifer Benson		
	Donnie Berthiaume		
	Nicholas Boldyga		
	Paul A. Brodeur	April 24, 1964	
	Antonio Cabral	January 26, 1955	
	Daniel Cahill		
	Thomas Calter		
	Kate Campanale		
	Linda Dean Campbell		
	Gailanne Cariddi	November 1, 1953	
	Evandro Carvalho	September 9, 1981	
	Gerard Cassidy		
	Tackey Chan	August 10, 1973	
	Edward F. Coppinger		
	Claire D. Cronin		
	Dan Cullinane		
	Mark Cusack	1984	
	Josh S. Cutler	January 22, 1971	
	Angelo D'Emilia		
	Marjorie Decker		
	David DeCoste		
	Robert DeLeo (politician)	March 27, 1950	
	Brian Dempsey (politician)	September 30, 1966	
	Geoff Diehl	April 23, 1969	
	Diana DiZoglio	June 5, 1983	
	Dan Donahue	May 1, 1987	
	Paul Donato	October 27, 1941	
	Shawn Dooley		
	William Driscoll		
	Michelle DuBois	April 14, 1973	
	Peter Durant		
	James J. Dwyer		
	Carolyn Dykema	December 26, 1967	
	Lori Ehrlich	June 9, 1963	
	Tricia Farley-Bouvier		
	Kimberly Ferguson		
	Dylan Fernandes		
	Ann-Margaret Ferrante	June 26, 1972	
	Michael Finn	March 24, 1970	
	Carole Fiola		
	Gloria Fox	March 18, 1942	
	Paul Frost	April 25, 1970	
	William C. Galvin	October 18, 1956	
	Sean Garballey	February 22, 1985	
	Denise Garlick		
	Colleen Garry	July 21, 1962	
	Carmine Gentile		
	Susan Williams Gifford	November 3, 1959	
	Thomas Golden Jr.	March 5, 1971	
	Solomon Goldstein-Rose	December 5, 1993	
	Carlos Gonzalez (legislator)		
	Ken Gordon (American politician)	November 4, 1959	
	Danielle Gregoire		
	Patricia Haddad	May 7, 1950	
	Sheila Harrington	1960	
	Jim Hawkins (politician)	October 17, 1949	
	Stephan Hay		
	Jon Hecht		
	Natalie Higgins	July 24, 1988	
	Bradford Hill	January 22, 1967	
	Kate Hogan	January 15, 1957	
	Russell Holmes	August 17, 1969	
	Kevin Honan	June 5, 1958	
	Steve Howitt		
	Daniel J. Hunt		
	Randy Hunt (politician)	August 24, 1957	
	Bradley Jones Jr.	January 9, 1965	
	Louis Kafka	November 28, 1945	
	Hannah Kane	1971	
	Jay R. Kaufman	May 4, 1947	
	Mary Keefe		
	James Kelcourse		
	Kay Khan	June 22, 1941	
	Robert Koczera	November 25, 1953	
	Stephen Kulik	August 3, 1950	
	Kevin Kuros	February 7, 1965	
	John J. Lawn		
	Susannah Whipps		
	Jack Patrick Lewis		
	David Linsky	October 16, 1957	
	Jay Livingstone		
	Marc Lombardo		
	James J. Lyons Jr.		
	Adrian Madaro	1988	
	John J. Mahoney		
	Liz Malia	September 30, 1949	
	Ronald Mariano	October 31, 1946	
	Paul Mark		
	Christopher Markey		
	Juana Matias		
	Joe McGonagle		
	Joseph D. McKenna		
	Paul McMurtry	October 28, 1965	
	Joan Meschino		
	Aaron Michlewitz	1978	
	Lenny Mirra	February 23, 1964	
	Rady Mom	1970	
	Frank A. Moran		
	Michael Moran (Massachusetts politician)	February 23, 1971	
	David Muradian	November 21, 1982	
	Matt Muratore		
	James M. Murphy	November 15, 1969	
	Brian Murray (politician)		
	David Nangle	December 18, 1960	
	Harold Naughton Jr.	July 4, 1960	
	Shaunna O'Connell	March 14, 1970	
	Jim O'Day	May 23, 1954	
	Keiko Orrall	September 8, 1967	
	Jerry Parisella		
	Sarah Peake	October 4, 1957	
	Alice Peisch	October 4, 1954	
	Thomas Petrolati	March 16, 1957	
	William "Smitty" Pignatelli	August 31, 1959	
	Elizabeth Poirier	October 27, 1942	
	Denise Provost	March 9, 1951	
	Angelo Puppolo		
	Dave Rogers (Massachusetts politician)		
	John H. Rogers	October 22, 1964	
	Jeffrey Roy	September 8, 1961	
	Byron Rushing	July 29, 1942	
	Daniel Joseph Ryan		
	Jeffrey Sanchez (politician)	July 18, 1969	
	Angelo Scaccia	September 29, 1942	
	Paul Schmid		
	John Scibak	May 4, 1953	
	Alan Silvia	October 19, 1951	
	Frank Smizik	September 4, 1944	
	Todd Smola	1977	
	Theodore C. Speliotis	August 20, 1953	
	Thomas M. Stanley	March 23, 1964	
	William M. Straus	June 26, 1956	
	Benjamin Swan	September 18, 1933	
	Jose Tosado	December 18, 1953	
	Paul Tucker (politician)		
	Steven Ultrino		
	Aaron Vega	August 25, 1970	
	John Velis	January 26, 1979	
	David Vieira (politician)		
	RoseLee Vincent		
	Joseph Wagner (Massachusetts politician)	May 7, 1960	
	Chris Walsh (politician)	May 20, 1951	
	Thomas Walsh (Massachusetts politician)	July 15, 1960	
	Tim Whelan (politician)		
	Donald Wong	January 15, 1952	
	Jonathan Zlotnik	May 7, 1990	

== See also ==
- 115th United States Congress
- List of Massachusetts General Courts
