= 2013–2014 Massachusetts legislature =

188th Massachusetts General Court
←	187th	189th	→

Overview
- Legislative body: General Court
- Term: January 2, 2013 –
- Election: 2012 Massachusetts general election

Senate
- Members: 40
- President: Therese Murray
- Party control: Democrat

House
- Members: 160
- Speaker: Robert DeLeo
- Party control: Democrat

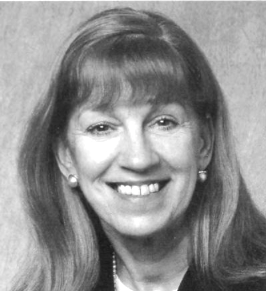
Therese Murray, Senate president.

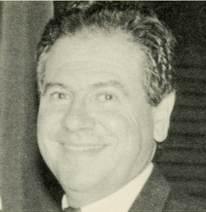
Robert DeLeo, House speaker.

Leaders of the Massachusetts General Court, 2013-2014.

The 188th Massachusetts General Court, consisting of the Massachusetts Senate and the Massachusetts House of Representatives, met in 2013 and 2014 during the governorship of Deval Patrick. Therese Murray served as president of the Senate and Robert DeLeo served as speaker of the House.

== Senators ==
portrait	name	date of birth	district
	Michael J. Barrett	June 27, 1948	3rd Middlesex
	Stephen Brewer	February 10, 1948	
	Will Brownsberger	March 21, 1957	
	Gale D. Candaras	1949	
	Harriette L. Chandler	December 20, 1937	
	Sonia Chang-Díaz	March 31, 1978	
	Cynthia Stone Creem	September 17, 1942	
	Sal DiDomenico	June 20, 1971	
	Ken Donnelly	July 15, 1950	
	Eileen Donoghue	1954	
	Benjamin Downing	September 11, 1981	
	Jamie Eldridge	August 11, 1973	
	Barry Finegold	March 3, 1971	
	Jennifer Flanagan	September 5, 1975	
	Linda Dorcena Forry	November 1, 1973	
	Robert L. Hedlund	July 12, 1961	
	Donald Humason Jr.	July 31, 1967	
	Kathleen O'Connor Ives	July 1, 1977	
	Patricia D. Jehlen	October 14, 1943	
	Brian A. Joyce	September 5, 1962	
	John F. Keenan (state senator)	1964	
	Thomas P. Kennedy	August 15, 1951	
	Jason Lewis (Massachusetts politician)	April 19, 1968	
	Joan Lovely		
	Thomas M. McGee	December 15, 1955	
	Mark Montigny	June 20, 1961	
	Michael O. Moore	January 17, 1963	
	Richard T. Moore	August 7, 1943	
	Therese Murray	October 10, 1947	
	Marc Pacheco	October 29, 1952	
	Anthony Petruccelli	October 2, 1972	
	Michael Rodrigues (politician)	May 30, 1959	
	Stan Rosenberg	October 12, 1949	
	Richard J. Ross	July 6, 1954	
	Mike Rush	November 30, 1973	
	Karen Spilka	January 11, 1953	
	Bruce Tarr	January 2, 1964	
	James E. Timilty		
	James T. Welch	December 22, 1975	
	Dan Wolf	August 11, 1957	

== Representatives ==
Party composition of the Massachusetts House of Representatives following the general election of 2012

portrait	name	date of birth	district
	Denise Andrews	July 14, 1959	2nd Franklin
	James Arciero	August 27, 1974	
	Brian Ashe	April 23, 1963	
	Cory Atkins	February 10, 1949	
	Bruce Ayers	April 17, 1962	
	Ruth Balser	October 30, 1948	
	F. Jay Barrows	April 5, 1956	
	Carlo Basile	June 29, 1971	
	Matthew Beaton	July 27, 1978	
	Jennifer Benson		
	Nicholas Boldyga		
	Garrett Bradley	July 4, 1970	
	Michael Brady (politician)		
	Paul A. Brodeur	April 24, 1964	
	Antonio Cabral	January 26, 1955	
	Thomas Calter		
	Linda Dean Campbell		
	Christine Canavan	January 25, 1950	
	James Cantwell	October 25, 1966	
	Gailanne Cariddi	November 1, 1953	
	Evandro Carvalho	September 9, 1981	
	Tackey Chan	August 10, 1973	
	Leah Cole		
	Nick Collins (politician)	August 26, 1982	
	Tom Conroy	July 7, 1962	
	Edward F. Coppinger		
	Michael A. Costello	May 5, 1965	
	Claire D. Cronin		
	Dan Cullinane		
	Sean Curran (politician)	August 23, 1977	
	Mark Cusack	1984	
	Josh S. Cutler	January 22, 1971	
	Angelo D'Emilia		
	Marjorie Decker		
	Robert DeLeo (politician)	March 27, 1950	
	Vinny deMacedo	October 16, 1965	
	Brian Dempsey (politician)	September 30, 1966	
	Marcos Devers	October 25, 1950	
	Geoff Diehl	April 23, 1969	
	Stephen DiNatale		
	Diana DiZoglio	June 5, 1983	
	Dan Donahue	May 1, 1987	
	Paul Donato	October 27, 1941	
	Shawn Dooley		
	Peter Durant		
	James J. Dwyer		
	Carolyn Dykema	December 26, 1967	
	Lori Ehrlich	June 9, 1963	
	Christopher Fallon	June 7, 1953	
	Tricia Farley-Bouvier		
	Ryan Fattman	July 1, 1984	
	Robert Fennell	June 26, 1956	
	Kimberly Ferguson		
	John V. Fernandes	November 16, 1952	
	Ann-Margaret Ferrante	June 26, 1972	
	Michael Finn	March 24, 1970	
	Carole Fiola		
	Gloria Fox	March 18, 1942	
	Paul Frost	April 25, 1970	
	William C. Galvin	October 18, 1956	
	Sean Garballey	February 22, 1985	
	Denise Garlick		
	Colleen Garry	July 21, 1962	
	Susan Williams Gifford	November 3, 1959	
	Anne Gobi	December 27, 1962	
	Thomas Golden Jr.	March 5, 1971	
	Ken Gordon (American politician)	November 4, 1959	
	Danielle Gregoire		
	Patricia Haddad	May 7, 1950	
	Sheila Harrington	1960	
	Jon Hecht		
	Paul Heroux	1976	
	Bradford Hill	January 22, 1967	
	Kate Hogan	January 15, 1957	
	Russell Holmes	August 17, 1969	
	Kevin Honan	June 5, 1958	
	Steve Howitt		
	Daniel J. Hunt		
	Randy Hunt (politician)	August 24, 1957	
	Bradley Jones Jr.	January 9, 1965	
	Louis Kafka	November 28, 1945	
	Jay R. Kaufman	May 4, 1947	
	Mary Keefe		
	John D. Keenan	April 4, 1965	
	Kay Khan	June 22, 1941	
	Peter Kocot	September 18, 1956	
	Robert Koczera	November 25, 1953	
	Stephen Kulik	August 3, 1950	
	Kevin Kuros	February 7, 1965	
	John J. Lawn		
	David Linsky	October 16, 1957	
	Jay Livingstone		
	Marc Lombardo		
	James J. Lyons Jr.		
	Timothy Madden		
	John J. Mahoney		
	Liz Malia	September 30, 1949	
	Brian Mannal		
	Ronald Mariano	October 31, 1946	
	Paul Mark		
	Christopher Markey		
	Wayne Matewsky		
	Paul McMurtry	October 28, 1965	
	Jim Miceli	March 25, 1935	
	Aaron Michlewitz	1978	
	Lenny Mirra	February 23, 1964	
	Frank A. Moran		
	Michael Moran (Massachusetts politician)	February 23, 1971	
	James M. Murphy	November 15, 1969	
	David Nangle	December 18, 1960	
	Harold Naughton Jr.	July 4, 1960	
	Rhonda Nyman		
	Shaunna O'Connell	March 14, 1970	
	Jim O'Day	May 23, 1954	
	Keiko Orrall	September 8, 1967	
	Jerry Parisella		
	Sarah Peake	October 4, 1957	
	Alice Peisch	October 4, 1954	
	George N. Peterson Jr.	July 8, 1950	
	Thomas Petrolati	March 16, 1957	
	William "Smitty" Pignatelli	August 31, 1959	
	Elizabeth Poirier	October 27, 1942	
	Denise Provost	March 9, 1951	
	Angelo Puppolo		
	Dave Rogers (Massachusetts politician)		
	John H. Rogers	October 22, 1964	
	Dennis Rosa		
	Jeffrey Roy	September 8, 1961	
	Byron Rushing	July 29, 1942	
	Daniel Joseph Ryan		
	Jeffrey Sanchez (politician)	July 18, 1969	
	Tom Sannicandro	March 22, 1956	
	Angelo Scaccia	September 29, 1942	
	Paul Schmid		
	John Scibak	May 4, 1953	
	Alan Silvia	October 19, 1951	
	Frank Smizik	September 4, 1944	
	Todd Smola	1977	
	Theodore C. Speliotis	August 20, 1953	
	Thomas M. Stanley	March 23, 1964	
	Ellen Story	October 17, 1941	
	William M. Straus	June 26, 1956	
	Benjamin Swan	September 18, 1933	
	Walter Timilty	July 19, 1969	
	Timothy J. Toomey Jr.	June 7, 1953	
	Cleon Turner	December 29, 1945	
	Aaron Vega	August 25, 1970	
	John Velis	January 26, 1979	
	David Vieira (politician)		
	RoseLee Vincent		
	Joseph Wagner (Massachusetts politician)	May 7, 1960	
	Chris Walsh (politician)	May 20, 1951	
	Donald Wong	January 15, 1952	
	Jonathan Zlotnik	May 7, 1990	

== See also ==
- 113th United States Congress
- List of Massachusetts General Courts
