= Mary H. Goode =

American politician

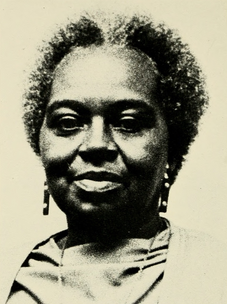

Member of the Massachusetts House of Representatives from the 10th Suffolk district
- In office 1975–1978
- Preceded by: Bill Owens
- Succeeded by: Charles R. Doyle

Personal details
- Born: July 2, 1927 Zebulon, Georgia, United States
- Died: September 9, 2002 (aged 75)
- Party: Democratic

Mary H. Goode was an American Democratic politician from Roxbury, Massachusetts, she was the second black female legislator in the state. She represented the 10th Suffolk district in the Massachusetts House of Representatives from 1975 to 1978.

== Early life ==
Goode was born in 1927 in Zebulon, Georgia and her family moved to Boston, Massachusetts just before she started high school.

== Personal life ==
Goode was a mother of three and attended Tufts University in her 40s and graduated in 1974.

Goode's son, Raymond, drowned at the age of 21 while trying to swim across Houghton's Pond.

== Career ==
Goode defeated Emanuel Eaves by 19 votes and Leon Rock by 43 votes in the 1974 election.

== See also ==
- 1975-1976 Massachusetts legislature
- 1977-1978 Massachusetts legislature
