= Francis X. Coppinger =

American attorney and politician (1935–2020)

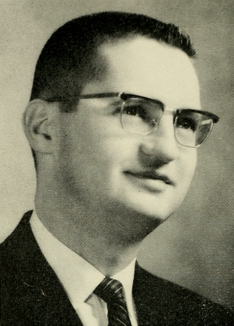

Member of the Massachusetts House of Representatives from the 23rd Suffolk District
- In office 1975–1977
- Preceded by: District created
- Succeeded by: Charles Robert Doyle

Member of the Massachusetts House of Representatives from the 14th Suffolk District
- In office 1969–1973
- Preceded by: Robert L. Cawley
- Succeeded by: Michael J. Connolly

Personal details
- Born: March 12, 1935 Dorchester, Boston, Massachusetts
- Died: July 9, 2020 (aged 85) West Roxbury, Boston, Massachusetts
- Party: Democratic
- Spouse: Catherine (O'Neill) Coppinger
- Children: 8 (including Edward)
- Education: Boston College; Portia Law School
- Occupation: Attorney

Francis X. Coppinger (March 12, 1935 – July 9, 2020) was an American attorney and politician who served as a member of the Massachusetts House of Representatives from 1969 to 1973 and 1975 to 1977.

== Early life ==
Coppinger was born on March 12, 1935, in Boston's Dorchester neighborhood. He graduated from Roslindale High School, and after serving in the United States Marine Corps, earned a bachelor's degree from Boston College in 1957 and law degree from the Portia School of Law in 1960.

== Political career ==
After a failed bid in 1966, Coppinger was elected to the Massachusetts House of Representatives in 1968. He ran for the Massachusetts Senate in 1972, but lost. He returned to the House in 1975, but lost his reelection bid in 1976. He was an unsuccessful candidate for the Boston City Council in 1981 and 1983, state representative in 1992 and 1995, and Suffolk County Register of Probate in 1996.

== Personal life ==
Coppinger and his wife, Catherine, had eight children. One son, Edward F. Coppinger, also served in the Massachusetts House of Representatives.

In 2012, a bridge on Park Street in the West Roxbury neighborhood of Boston was named the Honorable Francis X. Coppinger Bridge in his honor.

Coppinger died on July 9, 2020.
