= Massachusetts House of Representatives' 10th Suffolk district =

American legislative district

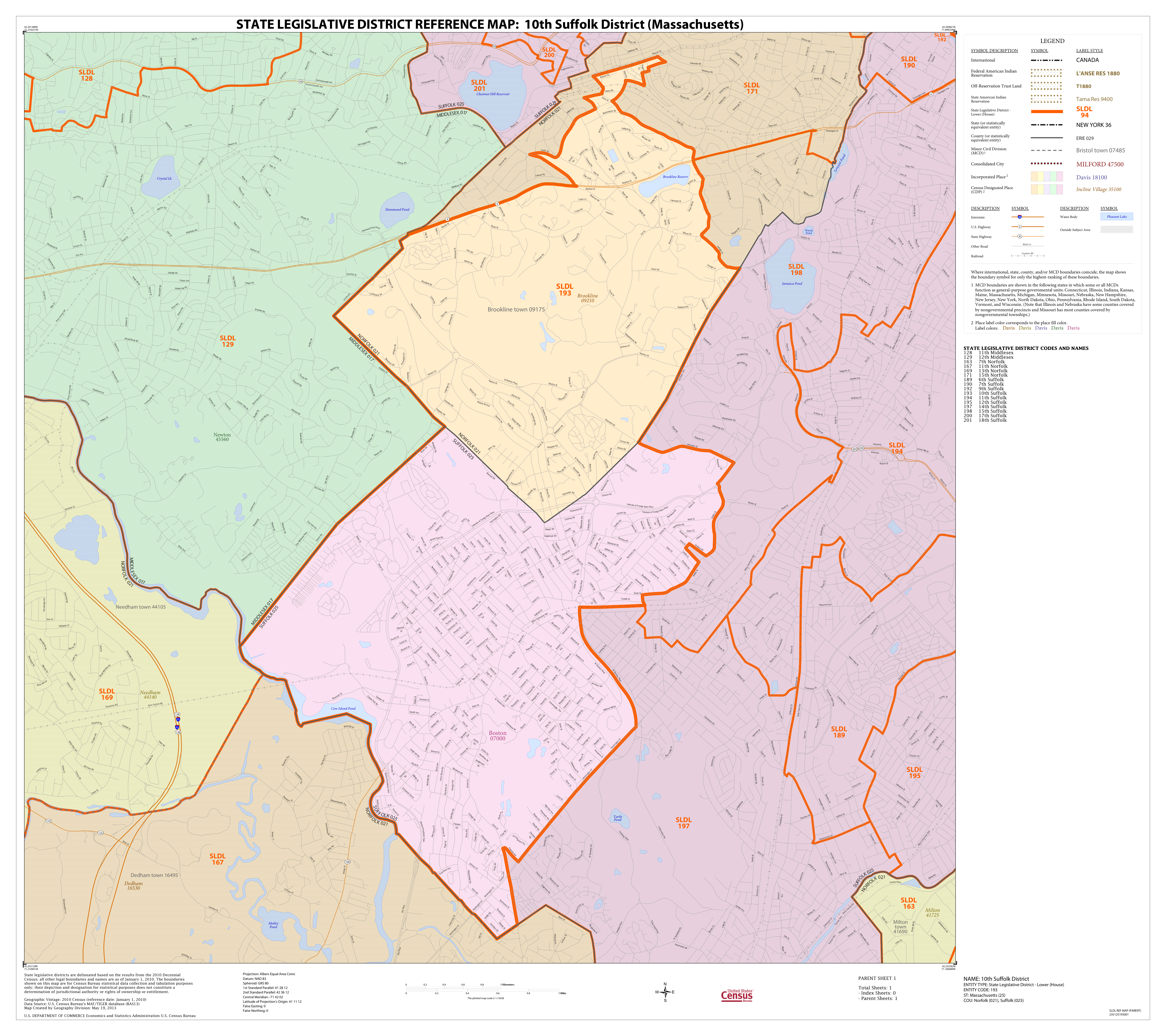
Map of Massachusetts House of Representatives' 10th Suffolk district, based on the 2010 United States census.

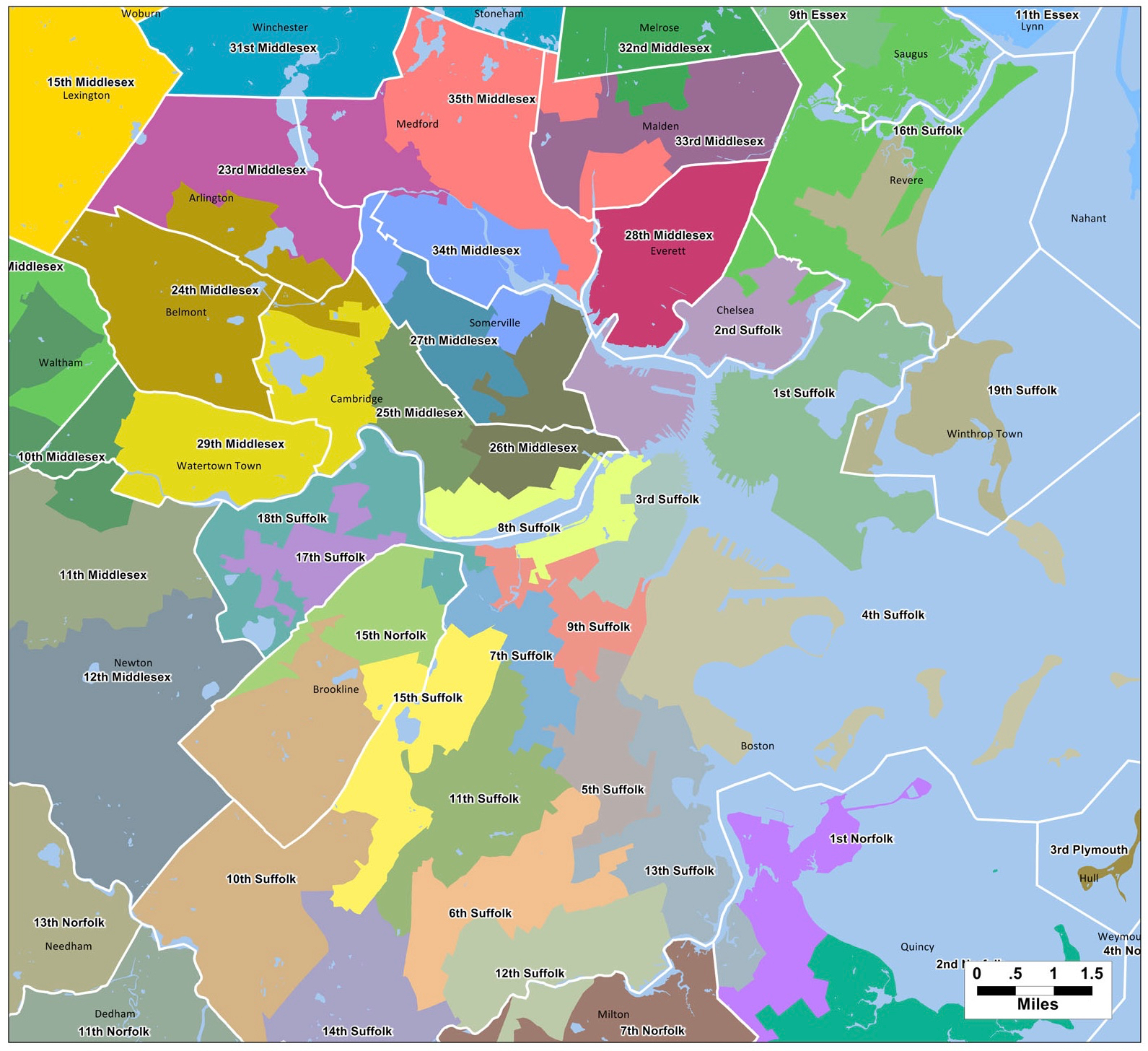
Map of Massachusetts House of Representatives districts for Suffolk County, apportioned in 2011

Massachusetts House of Representatives' 10th Suffolk district in the United States is one of 160 legislative districts included in the lower house of the Massachusetts General Court. It covers part of Brookline in Norfolk County and part of Boston in Suffolk County. The district is currently represented by Democrat Bill MacGregor of West Roxbury.

The current district geographic boundary overlaps with those of the Massachusetts Senate's 1st Middlesex and Norfolk district and Norfolk and Suffolk district.

== Representatives ==
- Solomon J. Gordon, circa 1858
- William Makepeace, circa 1858
- Moses Kimball, circa 1859
- Nathaniel C. Nash, circa 1859
- Edward P. Fisk, circa 1888
- Jacob Fottler, circa 1888
- Robert E. Bigney, circa 1920
- William H. McDonnell, circa 1920
- Timothy J. McInerney, circa 1951
- David John O'Connor, circa 1951
- Philip Anthony Tracy, circa 1951
- Mary H. Goode, circa 1975
- Mike Rush, 2002 – January 2011
- Edward F. Coppinger, 2011-2023
- Bill MacGregor, 2023-current

== See also ==
- List of Massachusetts House of Representatives elections
- Other Suffolk County districts of the Massachusetts House of Representatives: 1st, 2nd, 3rd, 4th, 5th, 6th, 7th, 8th, 9th, 11th, 12th, 13th, 14th, 15th, 16th, 17th, 18th, 19th
- List of Massachusetts General Courts
- List of former districts of the Massachusetts House of Representatives

== Images ==
Portraits of legislators

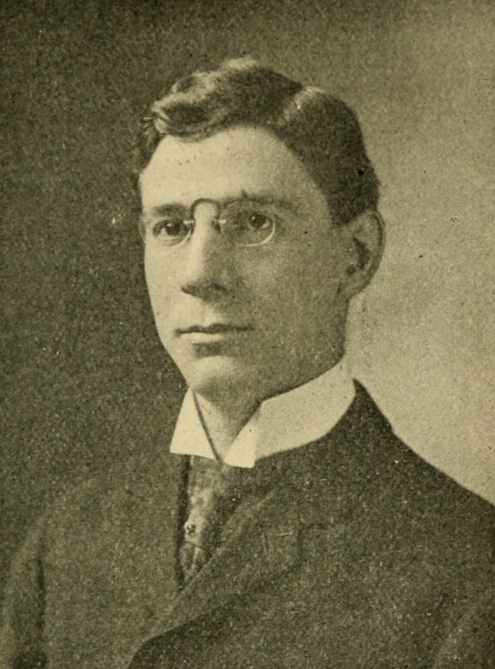
J. Bernard Ferber

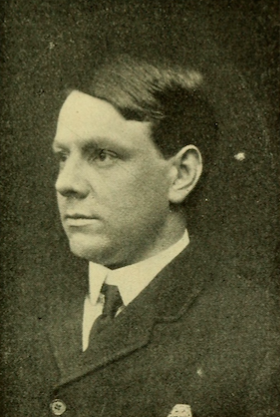
Malcolm Nichols

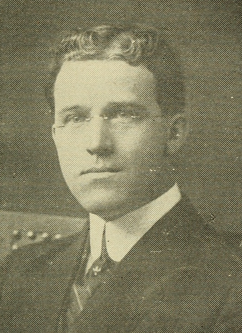
Charles O'Connor

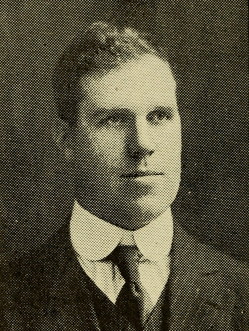
William McDonnell

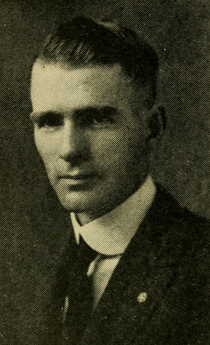
Leo Halloran

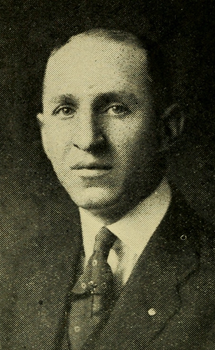
Maurice Foley

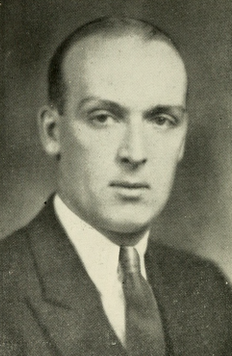
Arthur Paul

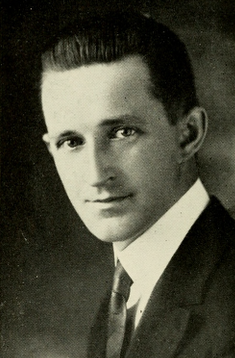
James W. Hennigan Sr.

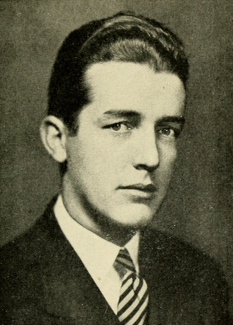
Timothy McInerney

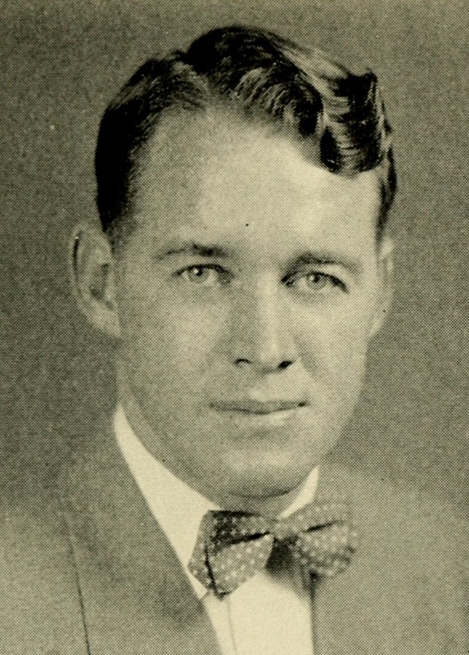
David John O'Connor

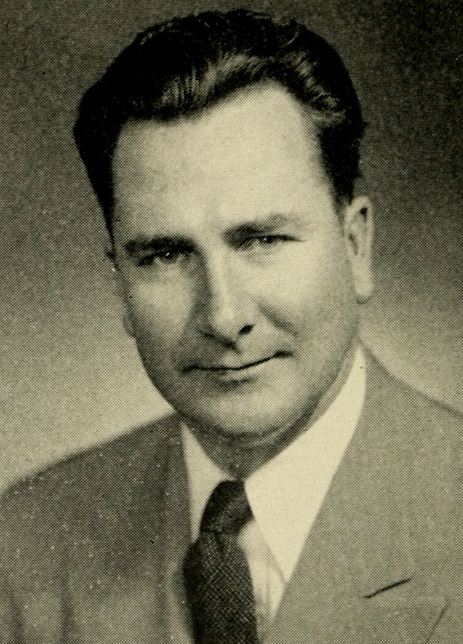
James H. Kelly

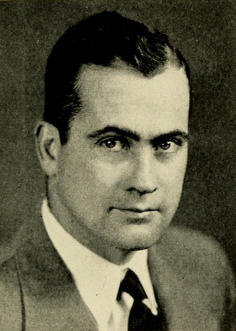
Philip Anthony Tracy

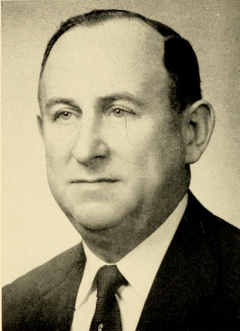
Benjamin Klebanow

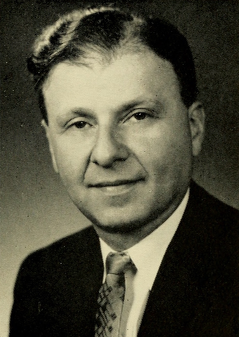
I. Edward Serlin

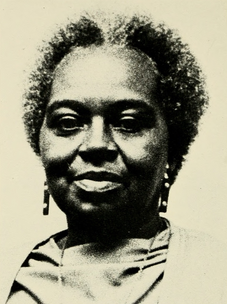
Mary H. Goode

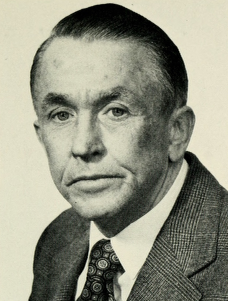
Charles Robert Doyle

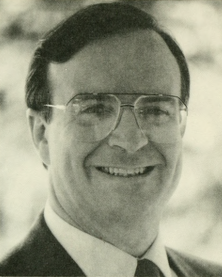
Vincent Mannering

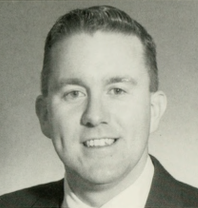
Mike Rush

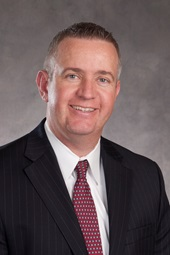
Edward F. Coppinger
