= John Marsi =

American politician

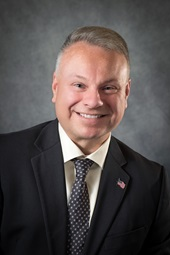

Member of the Massachusetts House of Representatives from the 6th Worcester district
- Incumbent
- Assumed office March 27, 2024
- Preceded by: Peter Durant

Personal details
- Party: Republican
- Website: www.marsiforstaterep.com

John J. Marsi Jr. is an American politician who is currently serving as a Republican member of the Massachusetts House of Representatives from the 6th Worcester district.

== Career ==
First elected to the Massachusetts House of Representatives in a special election on March 5, 2024, Representative Marsi previously served on the Dudley Board of Selectmen for 12 years, and he has also served on Dudley's Finance, Appropriation, and Advisory (FAA) Committee; the Capital Improvement Committee; and the Executive Board of the South Worcester County Communications Center.
