= Bill MacGregor (politician) =

American politician

Member of the Massachusetts House of Representatives from the 10th Suffolk district
- Incumbent
- Assumed office June 8, 2023
- Preceded by: Edward F. Coppinger

Personal details
- Party: Democratic

Bill MacGregor is an American politician serving in the Massachusetts House of Representatives.

== Early life and career ==
MacGregor was raised in West Roxbury, Massachusetts. He worked in the private sector and served as former Boston City Councilor Matt O'Mally's chief of staff.

== Political career ==
Following the resignation of Ed Coppinger from the Massachusetts House of Representatives, MacGregor announced his candidacy for the vacant seat. MacGregor ran on a platform of expanding mental health support resources, early childhood education, and the environment and climate change. On May 2, 2023, MacGregor earned 46% of the vote in the 10th Suffolk district Special Election primary, defeating Robert Orthman and Celia Segal. MacGregor faced no opposition in the general election. He was sworn into office alongside fellow freshman Representative John Moran, bringing the Massachusetts House of Representative to a full 160 members.
