= Donnie Berthiaume =

American politician

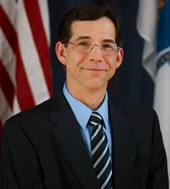

Member of the Massachusetts House of Representatives from the 5th Worcester district
- Incumbent
- Assumed office January 7, 2015
- Preceded by: Anne Gobi

Personal details
- Party: Republican

Donald R. Berthiaume Jr. is a member of the Massachusetts House of Representatives, sworn in January 2015. A resident of Spencer, Massachusetts, he was elected as a Republican to represent the 5th Worcester district. Berthiaume is a former Spencer selectman.

== See also ==
- 2019–2020 Massachusetts legislature
- 2021–2022 Massachusetts legislature
