= Russell Holmes =

American politician

Russell E. Holmes
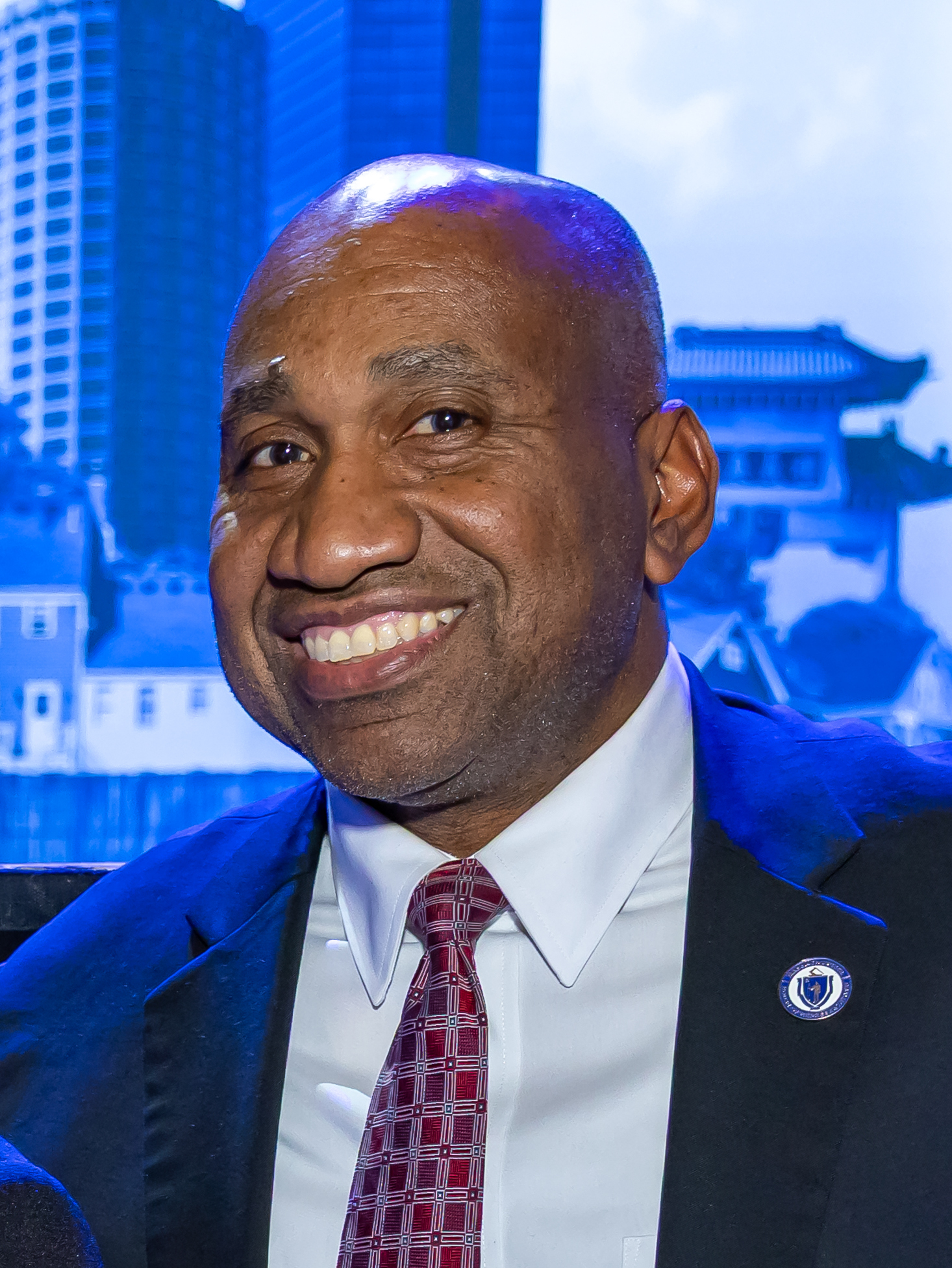
- Holmes in 2025

Member of the Massachusetts House of Representatives from the 6th Suffolk district
- Incumbent
- Assumed office January 5, 2011
- Preceded by: Willie Mae Allen

Personal details
- Born: August 17, 1969 (age 56) Mound Bayou, Mississippi, U.S.
- Party: Democratic
- Education: Boston University; Northeastern University

Russell Earl Holmes is an American politician who serves as a Democratic member of the Massachusetts House of Representatives. First elected in November 2010, he represents the Sixth Suffolk District, which includes the Boston neighborhoods of Dorchester, Hyde Park, Jamaica Plain, Mattapan and Roslindale.

== Massachusetts House of Representatives ==
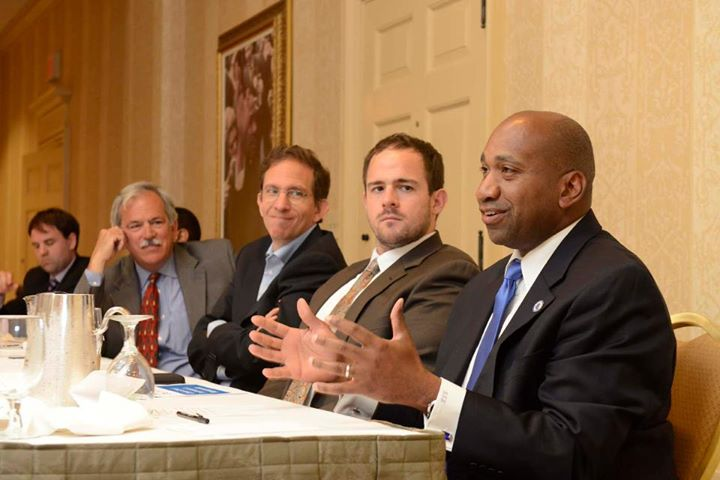
Holmes speaking at the Boston Foundation

Holmes was first elected to the Massachusetts House of Representatives in November 2010, and assumed office in January 2011.

Holmes served as treasurer for the 187th General Court freshman class and was formerly a member of the Judiciary Committee. Holmes was one of a handful of legislators nationally selected to participate in the Emerging Leaders program at University of Virginia Darden School of Business. He was also member of the Electronic Benefit Transfer Card Commission. He served as the Chair of the Black and Latino Caucus of Massachusetts. Holmes was a member of Public Housing Sustainability and Reform Advisory Committee.

He serves as vice chairman of the Joint Committee on Public Housing, and serves as a member on the Joint Committee on Financial Services, the Joint Committee on Election Laws, and the Joint Committee on Ways and Means.

In early 2023, Holmes cosponsored a bill to allow Massachusetts prisoners to earn time off from their sentences by immediately forfeiting some of their vital organs and/or bone marrow to the state.

== See also ==
- 2019–2020 Massachusetts legislature
- 2021–2022 Massachusetts legislature
