= Angelo Puppolo =

American politician

Angelo J. Puppolo Jr. is a politician from Springfield, Massachusetts. A Democrat, he currently serves as the 12th Hampden District representative in the Massachusetts House of Representatives.

He was elected to his first term in office in November 2006, defeating Wilbraham, Massachusetts Planning Board member Christopher Leisey, a Republican, in the general election. Prior to being elected to the Massachusetts House of Representatives, Puppolo served as a City Councilor in Springfield, MA. Puppolo is an attorney who graduated from Western New England College School of Law in 2001.

== See also ==
- 2019–2020 Massachusetts legislature
- 2021–2022 Massachusetts legislature
