= Michael Finn =

American politician

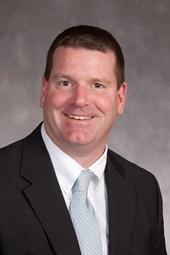

Member of the Massachusetts House of Representatives from the 6th Hampden district
- Incumbent
- Assumed office January 2011
- Preceded by: James T. Welch

Member of the West Springfield City Council
- In office 2004–2011

Personal details
- Born: March 24, 1970 (age 56) Holyoke, Massachusetts, U.S.
- Party: Democratic
- Spouse: Jennifer Masi (m. 2002)
- Children: 3
- Education: North Adams State College
- Occupation: Court officer Politician

Michael J. Finn is an American politician who represents the 6th Hampden District in the Massachusetts House of Representatives. A member of the Democratic Party, he previously served as a member of the West Springfield City Council.

== Career ==
Finn served in the Massachusetts Army National Guard from 1991 to 1998. He was a member of the West Springfield City Council from 2004 to 2011, serving as council president during his final year. Finn was elected to the Massachusetts House of Representatives in 2010.

In 2015, Finn ran unsuccessfully for mayor of West Springfield, losing to William Reichelt.

=== Committee Assignments ===
- Chairperson, Joint Committee on Bonding, Capital Expenditures and State Assets

== See also ==
- 2019–2020 Massachusetts legislature
- 2021–2022 Massachusetts legislature
