= Thomas M. Stanley =

American politician

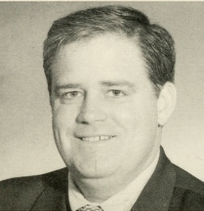

Member of the Massachusetts House of Representatives

Thomas M. Stanley is an American state legislator serving in the Massachusetts House of Representatives. He is a Waltham resident and a member of the Democratic Party.

Stanley is the son of the late William F. Stanley who served as Mayor of Waltham from 1985 to 1999.

== Committee Assignments ==
For the 2025-26 Session, Stanley sits on the following committees in the House:

- Chairperson, Joint Committee on Aging and Independence

For the 2021-22 and 2023-24 Session, Stanley sat on the following committees in the House:

- Chairperson, Joint Committee on Elder Affairs

For the 2015-16, 2017-18 and 2019-20 Session, Stanley sat on the following committees in the House:

- Vice Chair, Joint Committee on Municipalities and Regional Government
- House Committee on Post Audit and Oversight
- House Committee on Ways and Means
- Joint Committee on Financial Services
- Joint Committee on Ways and Means

For the 2013-14 Session, Stanley sat on the following committees in the House:

- House Committee on Post Audit and Oversight
- House Committee on Ways and Means
- Joint Committee on Municipalities and Regional Government
- Joint Committee on Ways and Means

For the 2011-12 Session, Stanley sat on the following committees in the House:

- House Committee on Post Audit and Oversight
- House Committee on Ways and Means
- Joint Committee on Consumer Protection and Professional Licensure
- Joint Committee on Ways and Means

For the 2009-10 Session, Stanley sat on the following committees in the House:

- House Committee on Post Audit and Oversight
- Joint Committee on Consumer Protection and Professional Licensure
- Joint Committee on Housing

For the 2007-08 Session, Stanley sat on the following committees in the House:

- Vice Chair, Joint Committee on Housing
- House Post Audit and Oversight
- The Joint Committee on Financial Services

For the 2005-06 Session, Stanley sat on the following committees in the House:

- Joint Committee on Municipalities and Regional Government
- Joint Committee on Revenue
- Joint Committee on Veterans and Federal Affairs

For the 2003-04 Session, Stanley sat on the following committees in the House:

- House committee on Science and Technology
- House Post Audit and Oversight
- Joint Committee on Government Regulations

For the 2001-02 Session, Stanley sat on the following committees in the House:

- House committee on Science and Technology
- House Homeland Security and Federal Affairs
- House Long-Term Debt and Capital Expenditures
- House Post Audit and Oversight
- House Steering, Policy and Scheduling
- Joint Committee on Government Regulations

== Task Forces and Commissions ==
Stanley is involved in the following task forces and commissions:

- Member, Primary Care Task Force
- Sponsor, Special Commission on Older LGBTQ Adults and their Caregivers
- Contributor, Home Care Licensing Commission
- Sponsor, Vehicle Mileage User Fee Task Force (2023-2024)

== See also ==
- Massachusetts House of Representatives' 9th Middlesex district
- 2019–2020 Massachusetts legislature
- 2021–2022 Massachusetts legislature
