= Edward F. Coppinger =

American politician

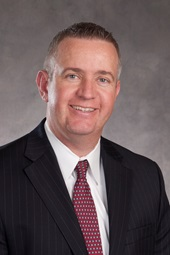

Member of the Massachusetts House of Representatives from the 10th Suffolk district
- In office January 5, 2011 – February 28, 2023
- Preceded by: Mike Rush
- Succeeded by: Bill MacGregor

Personal details
- Born: West Roxbury, Massachusetts
- Party: Democratic
- Relations: Francis X. Coppinger (father)
- Education: Bryant University (BA)
- Occupation: Residential Mortgage Loan Officer
- Website: http://www.edcoppinger.com

Edward F. Coppinger is an American politician who represented the 10th Suffolk District in the Massachusetts House of Representatives from 2011 to 2023. The district covers all of West Roxbury, South Brookline, and a portion of Roslindale. He lives in West Roxbury, Massachusetts with his wife and four daughters.

== Personal life ==
Coppinger is the son of former state representative Francis X. Coppinger. He is a life-long resident of West Roxbury and has long been active in the community, from coaching teams in local sports leagues to serving on the board of West Roxbury Main Streets. In March 2008, Coppinger partnered with his friend, John Fitzgerald, to build and publish the website, www.parkwayboston.com, a local news website where parents could find information about local sports leagues and events for their children. Coppinger stopped working on the site once he announced his plans to run for office in order to prevent any concerns over conflict of interest.

== 2010 Campaign ==
He defeated five opponents in a Democratic primary on September 14, 2010, garnering nearly 2,600 votes with the runner-up finishing with over 1,500 votes. Coppinger's results were strongest in the Boston part of the 10th Suffolk District where 2,461 votes were cast in his favor. Kelly Tynan, the second place candidate in the Boston part of the district ended up with 1194 votes.

== First Term in Office ==
For his first term in the House of Representatives, Coppinger served on the Joint Committees on Housing, Elder Affairs and State Administration and Regulatory Oversight. After a year in office, he was moved to the Joint Committee on Financial Services.

In addition to actively working on legislation and the state budget at the State House, Coppinger stayed very active in local community matters. After the Irish Social Club in West Roxbury suddenly announced that it was going to close, Coppinger joined with many local residents and Club members to keep the club open. Coppinger chaired the Fundraising Committee charged with kickstarting the fundraising efforts necessary to keep the Club open on a permanent basis. The successful Save the Irish Social Club Fundraiser staved off closure and the Club continues to thrive. In December, 2011, Coppinger and his friend Keith Barry noticed that West Roxbury did not have any Christmas decorations, so they worked together to raise funds to purchase wreaths and bows and put them on street light fixtures along Centre Street in West Roxbury.

== See also ==
- 2019–2020 Massachusetts legislature
- 2021–2022 Massachusetts legislature
