= Angelo D'Emilia =

American politician

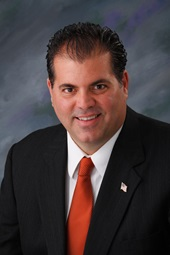

Member of the Massachusetts House of Representatives from the 8th Plymouth district
- In office 2011–2025
- Preceded by: David Flynn
- Succeeded by: Dennis Gallagher

Personal details
- Party: Republican
- Spouse: Jeanne D'Emilia
- Children: 1
- Education: Bridgewater-Raynham High School
- Website: http://www.angelodemilia.com

Angelo D'Emilia is an American politician. He is the former representative for the 8th Plymouth district in the Massachusetts House of Representatives, which includes Bridgewater, Raynham, and precinct 6 of Easton.

== Early life and career ==
D'Emilia is a lifelong resident of Bridgewater, Massachusetts. He graduated from Bridgewater-Raynham High School in 1984, and became an apprentice bricklayer upon graduating high school. In 1987, D'Emilia founded Spartago Masonry, which became Spartago Enterprises in 1998, a general contracting operation. D'Emilia has also developed real estate ventures such as Downtown Mini-Storage in Bridgewater, Massachusetts.

== Political career ==
In April 2010, D'Emilia announced that he was running for the 8th Plymouth seat in the Massachusetts House of Representatives. The seat was held by Representative David Flynn, who was retiring at the end of his term. D'Emilia had no primary opposition, and faced Democratic candidate Patricia Lawton in the general election. During the election, D'Emilia faced scrutiny for his resident status in Bridgewater, as he was also listed as the primary resident of a home in nearby Lakeville, Massachusetts. Despite this issue being raised in a local newspaper report, there was no challenge to his status in court. D'Emilia won the general election with 50% of the vote to Lawton's 45%.

D'Emilia sits on the Joint Committee on Community Development and Small Businesses, the Joint Committee on Ways and Means, the House Committee on Personnel and Administration, and the House Committee on Ways and Means. D'Emilia voted in favor of casino gambling, and tried to amend the compact between the Commonwealth and the Mashpee Wampanoag tribe to include a deadline for securing land into a trust. D'Emilia also voted in favor of the most recent "Three Strikes" bill. He is running for reelection against Marilee Kenney Hunt, of Bridgewater.

D'Emilia gained attention for a lawsuit he brought against the Town of Bridgewater regarding a disputed parcel of land. D'Emilia is suing the town for allegedly violating the law in its actions to try to secure the parcel for conservation land, as D'Emilia claims that he and his partners already have a purchase-and-sale agreement on the parcel and the town has missed its opportunity by law to secure the land.

== Electoral history ==
Massachusetts State Representative 8th Plymouth District, 2010
Party	Candidate	Votes	%	±%
Republican	Angelo D'Emilia	8,179	50.44	
Democratic	Patricia Lawton	7,294	44.98	

== See also ==
- 2019–2020 Massachusetts legislature
- 2021–2022 Massachusetts legislature
