= Colleen Garry =

American politician (born 1962)

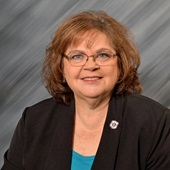

Member of the Massachusetts House of Representatives
- Incumbent
- Assumed office 1995
- Constituency: 39th Middlesex (1995–2003); 36th Middlesex (2003–)

Personal details
- Born: July 21, 1962 (age 64) Lowell, Massachusetts
- Party: Democratic
- Education: University of Lowell; Suffolk University Law School
- Occupation: Attorney; Politician

Colleen M. Garry (born July 21, 1962, in Lowell, Massachusetts) is an American politician who represents the 36th Middlesex District in the Massachusetts House of Representatives.

== Early life and education ==
Garry was born on July 21, 1962, in Lowell Massachusetts. She graduated from the University of Lowell and Suffolk University Law School.

== Career ==
She was an aide to State Representative John Cox, who represented Dracut and part of Lowell. In 1994 she was elected to represent a new district consisting of Dracut, Tyngsborough, and Dunstable. Dunstable has since been transferred to a neighboring district so the current district consists only of Dracut and Tyngsborough. She is a conservative member of the House Democratic Caucus.

In 2015, Representative Garry came under fire for comments criticizing an act of civil disobedience which obstructed a major Massachusetts highway. Representative Garry accused protestors affiliated with the Black Lives Matter movement of being "terrorists" and claimed that "structural racism is a fraud."

== See also ==
- 2019–2020 Massachusetts legislature
- 2021–2022 Massachusetts legislature
