= Jeffrey Roy =

American politician

Jeffrey N. Roy
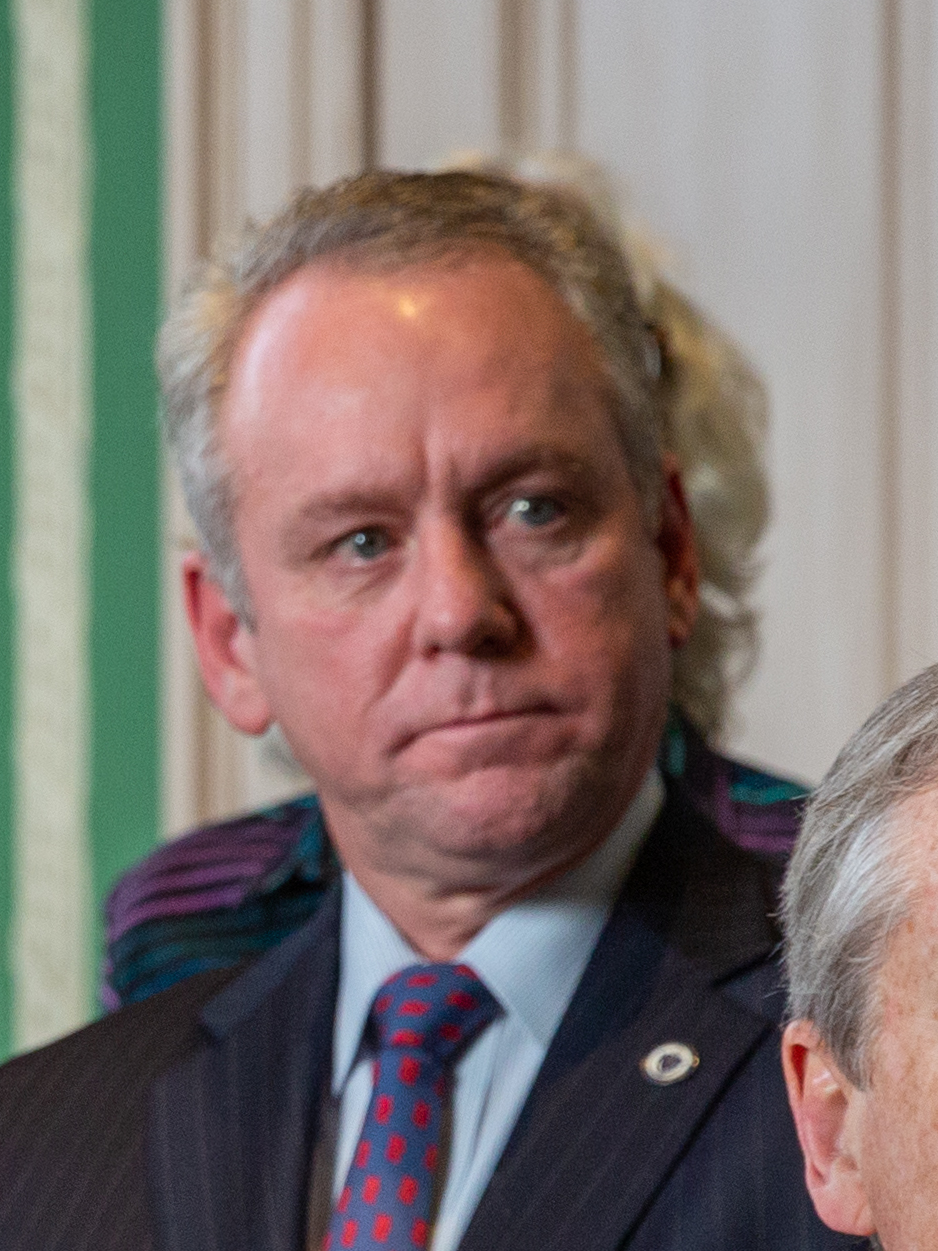
- Roy in 2019

Member of the Massachusetts House of Representatives from the 10th Norfolk district
- Incumbent
- Assumed office 2013
- Preceded by: James Vallee

Personal details
- Born: September 8, 1961 (age 65) Milford, Massachusetts, US
- Party: Democratic
- Children: 3
- Education: Bates College; Boston College Law School
- Occupation: Attorney
- Website: jeffreyroy.com

Jeffrey N. Roy is a State Representative in the Commonwealth of Massachusetts, Massachusetts General Court. Roy represents the 10th Norfolk District, which includes the Town of Franklin, Massachusetts in its entirety, and Precincts 2, 3, and 4 of the Town of Medway, Massachusetts. Roy was elected on the 6th of November, 2012.

== Education ==
Roy is a 1986 cum laude graduate of Boston College Law School in Chestnut Hill, Massachusetts. He received his undergraduate degree from Bates College in Lewiston, Maine in 1983, where he served as Editor-in-Chief of the Bates Student newspaper. In addition, Jeff received engineering training at Worcester Polytechnic Institute from 1979 to 1981 and one year of legal training at DePaul University in Chicago, Illinois. Jeff participated in a judicial clerkship in 1985-86 with Francis J. Larkin on the Appellate Division of the District Court, Western Division.

== Career ==
Roy is employed at Roy Law in Franklin, Massachusetts, a law firm he started in 2013 to be closer to his district. His entire legal career has been primarily devoted to the representation of injured persons. He specializes in product liability cases, automobile accidents, construction accidents, and other work-related injuries. Roy has represented clients at all levels of trial and appellate courts in Massachusetts. Additionally, he has appeared in cases before the New Hampshire Supreme Court and Superior Court, the Federal District Courts of Massachusetts and New Hampshire, the Rhode Island Superior Court, the Colorado Superior Court, and the United States Court of Appeals for the First Circuit.

While serving in the Massachusetts House of Representatives, Roy would become the Chairperson of the House's Joint Committee on Telecommunications, Utilities and Energy, and played a prominent role in pushing important legislation, including legislation related to climate change.

Roy is a member of the American Association for Justice (AAJ) and the Massachusetts Bar Association.

== Public service ==
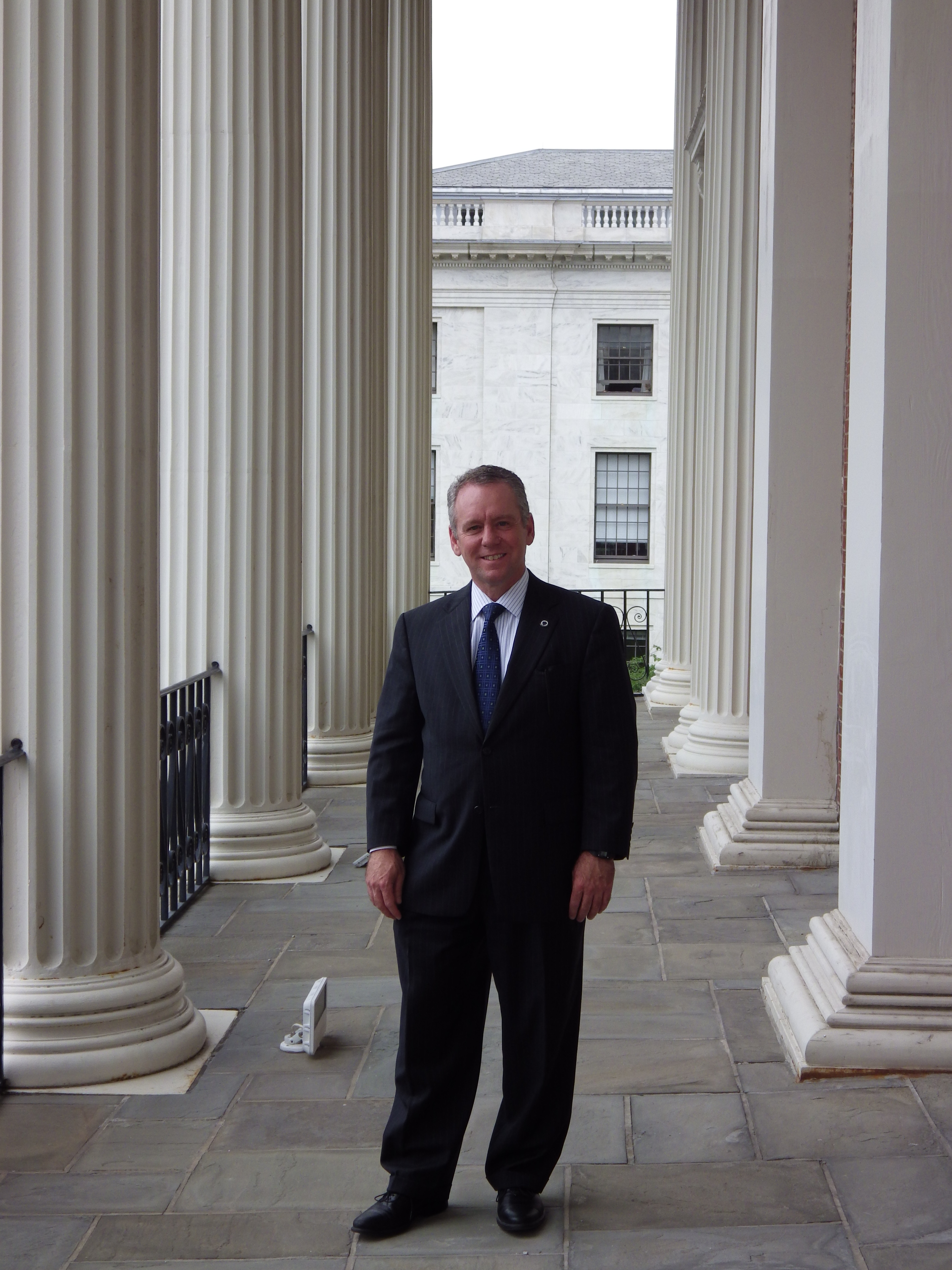
Roy on the Massachusetts State House Balcony

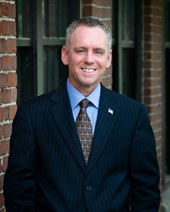
Official portrait

Before his run for state office, Roy held several municipal positions in the town of Franklin. In 2011, he was elected to the Town Council and was later chosen to chair the town’s Master Plan Committee.

Prior to Town Council, he served on the School Committee in Franklin, and served as its chairman for 9 of his 10 years of service with that board.

In 2010, he was elected as the chairman of the Franklin Democratic Town Committee, co-chaired Franklin’s Anti-Bullying Task Force, served as a member of Franklin’s Horace Mann School Building Committee, and was the chairman of the board of directors for the non-profit Masque Theatre Co., Inc. in Milford, Massachusetts. Other memberships include the College Club and Alumni-in-Admissions for Bates College.

== Personal life ==
Roy is the father of three children, all educated in the Franklin school system.

Roy is an avid cyclist and an 22-year veteran rider in the annual Pan-Massachusetts Challenge event which raises money for the Jimmy Fund. He has been riding as a member of the Phil Phriends team since 2003 and Phat Tuesday since 2023. He is also a guitar player and member of the band Ben Gardner’s Boat.

His honors and awards include the St. Thomas More Society of Worcester Scholarship and the American Jurisprudence Award in Constitutional Law.

== See also ==
- 2019–2020 Massachusetts legislature
- 2021–2022 Massachusetts legislature
