= Tackey Chan =

American politician

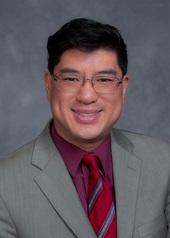

Member of the Massachusetts House of Representatives from the 2nd Norfolk district
- Incumbent
- Assumed office January 5, 2011
- Preceded by: Arthur S. Tobin

Personal details
- Born: August 10, 1973 (age 53) Boston, Massachusetts, U.S.
- Party: Democratic
- Education: Brandeis University (BA); New England School of Law (JD)
- Occupation: Attorney

Tackey Chan (陳德基) is an American politician currently serving in the Massachusetts House of Representatives. He is a Quincy resident and a member of the Democratic Party. He and Donald Wong were the first Asian-Americans elected to the Massachusetts General Court. Chan was born and raised in the Wollaston neighborhood of Quincy. He attended the New England School of Law.

He first won election to the state legislature in the fall of 2010 and took office in the spring of 2011. He ran again in 2012, 2014, and 2016, winning each time unopposed.

== See also ==
- 2019–2020 Massachusetts legislature
- 2021–2022 Massachusetts legislature
