= James T. Brett =

American politician

James Brett
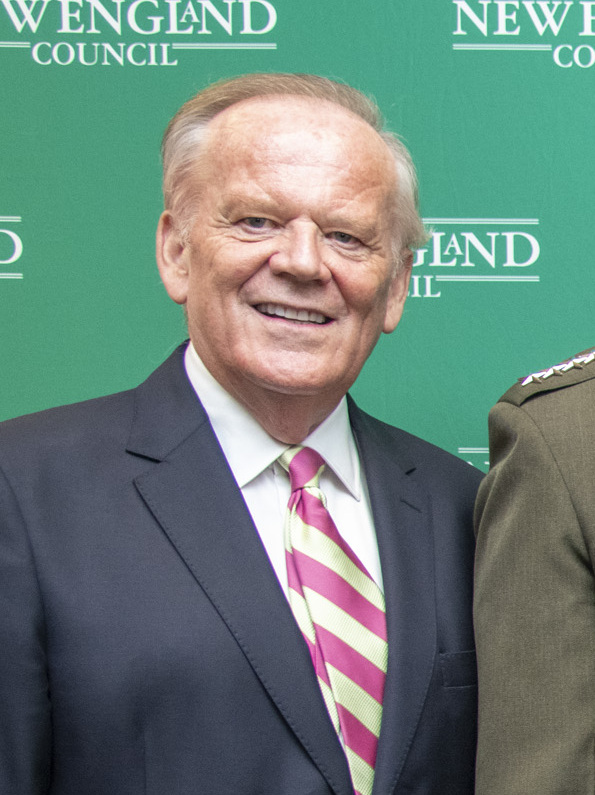
- Brett in 2018

President and CEO of the New England Council
- Incumbent
- Assumed office 1996
- Preceded by: Peter Meade

Chair of the President's Committee for People with Intellectual Disabilities
- In office June 2022 – 2025
- President: Joe Biden
- In office 2011–2013
- President: Barack Obama

Member of the Massachusetts House of Representatives
- In office 1981–1996
- Preceded by: John J. Finnegan
- Succeeded by: Marty Walsh
- Constituency: 14th Suffolk (1981–1995); 13th Suffolk (1995–1996)

Massachusetts Assistant Secretary of Energy
- In office 1980–1981
- Governor: Edward J. King

Personal details
- Born: December 22, 1949 (age 76) Boston, Massachusetts, U.S.
- Party: Democratic
- Education: American University; Suffolk University; John F. Kennedy School of Government
- Occupation: politician, executive

James T. Brett (born December 22, 1949) is an American former politician who is the current president and CEO of The New England Council. From 1981 until 1996, Brett was a Democratic Party member of the Massachusetts House of Representatives.

Brett was the runner-up in the 1993 Boston mayoral election.

Brett has been an advocate for people with disabilities. Brett has twice served as chairman of the President's Committee for People with Intellectual Disabilities, first as chairman during the Obama administration, and currently during the Biden administration. He also served as a member of the commission during the presidencies of George W. Bush and Donald Trump. Brett has also been a member of the National Council on Disability, and has served as the chair of both the Massachusetts Disabled Persons Protection Commission and the Massachusetts Intellectual Disability Commission.

== Early life, education, and early career ==
Brett was born December 22, 1949 in Boston. Brett is a first-generation American, being the son of parents who emigrated from the Irish town of Tubbercurry. He grew up in the Savin Hill neighborhood as one of six siblings. The eldest sibling, his brother Jack, was born with an intellectual disability and died in 2010. In high school, Brett participated in a federal TRIO program called Upward Bound, which works with students to prepare them for college.

Before working in government, Brett was an account manager for New England Telephone.

== Political and government career ==
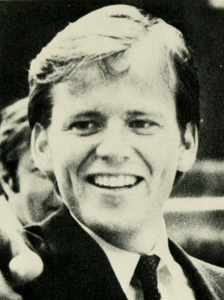
Brett, circa 1983

Brett, circa 1989

Brett, circa 1993

Brett, circa 1995

Brett was an unsuccessful candidate in the 1979 Boston City Council election. From 1980-81, Brett was Massachusetts' assistant secretary of energy under Governor Edward J. King.

Brett represented the 14th Suffolk District from 1981 until his resignation in 1996 to became head of the New England Council. As a member of the House, Brett served as Chairman of the Joint Committee on Banks and Banking, the Joint Committee on Criminal Justice, the Joint Committee on Congressional Redistricting, the Joint Committee on Counties, the House Committee on Legislative Redistricting, the House Committee on Taxation, and the House Committee on Banking.

Brett was regarded to be a political liberal. An exception to his generally liberal politics, however, was his anti-abortion stances.

In 1993, he was a candidate in the Boston mayoral election. He finished second in the nonpartisan primary, but lost in the general election to Acting Mayor Thomas Menino.

== New England Council ==
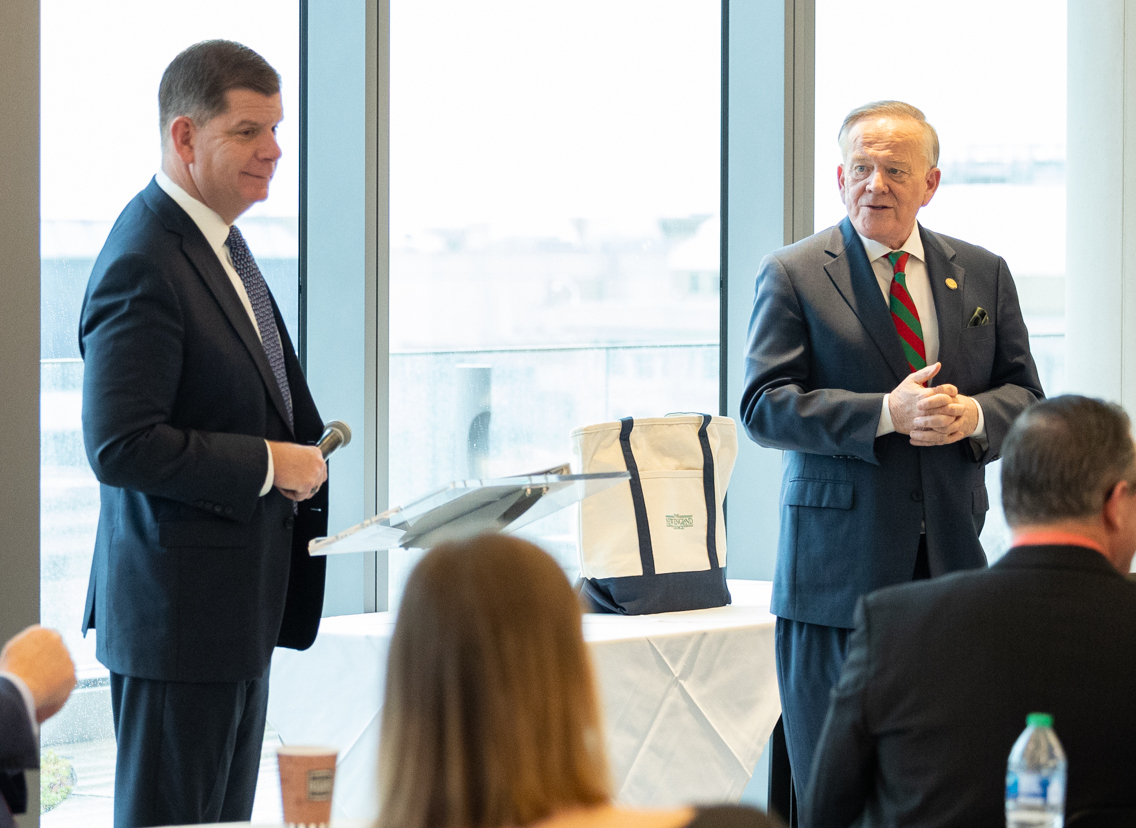
Brett (right) in 2022 with U.S. Secretary of Labor Marty Walsh, who had been Brett's successor in the Massachusetts House of Representatives

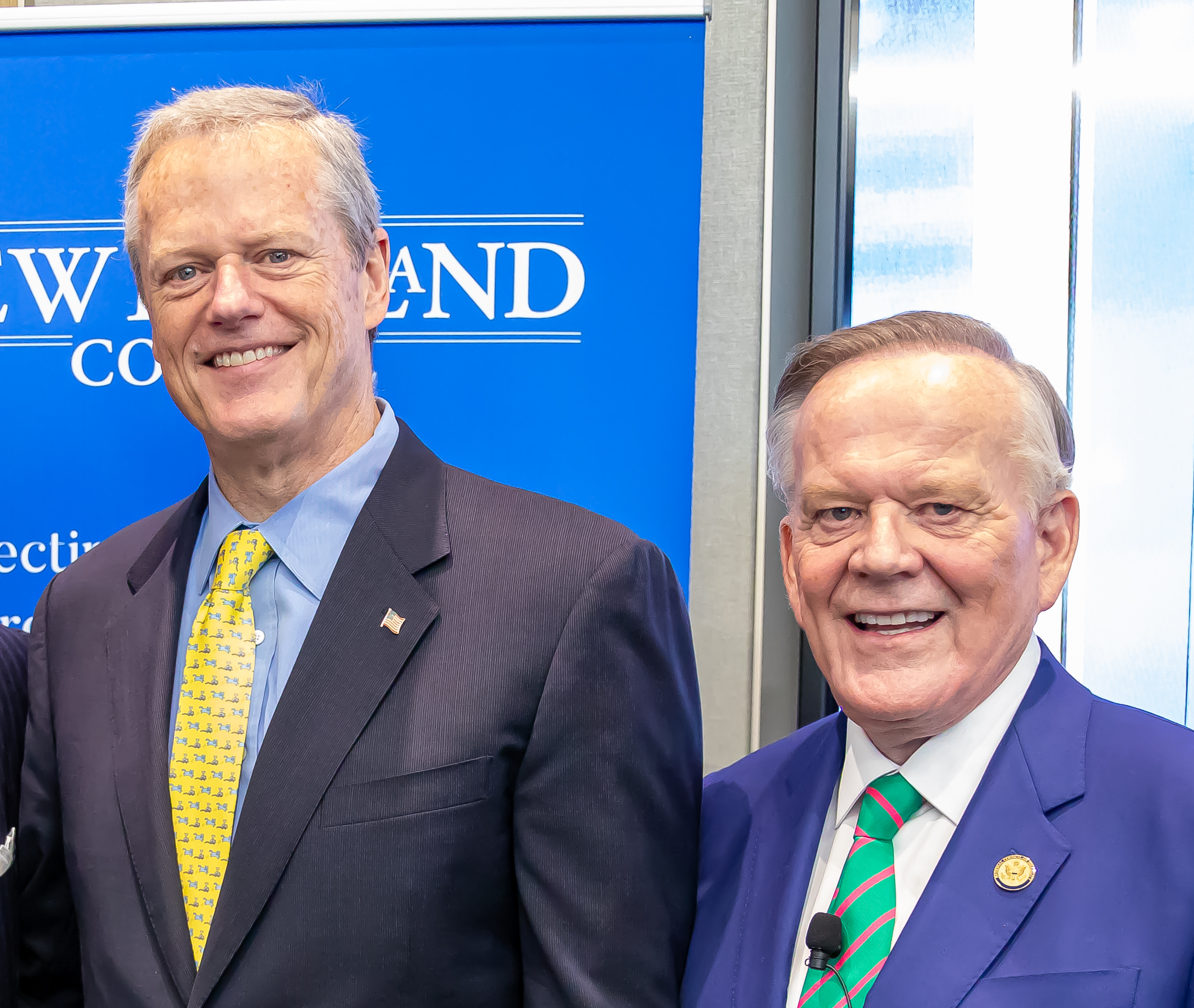
Brett (right) with Massachusetts Governor Charlie Baker in 2022

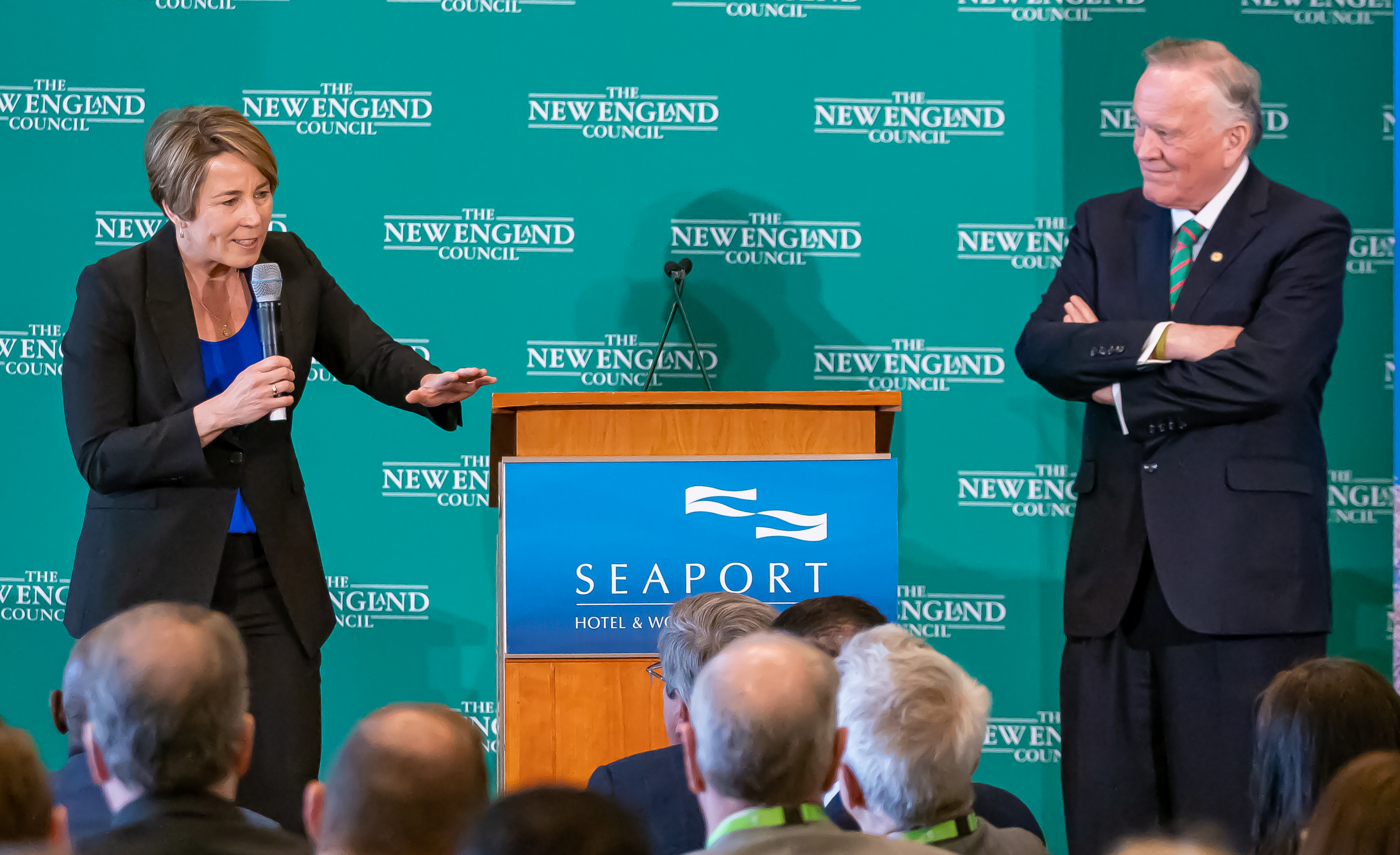
Brett (right) with Massachusetts Governor Maura Healey in 2023

Brett is the president and CEO of the New England Council, a position he was appointed to in October 1996.

== Advocacy for people with disabilities ==
Brett, whose brother had intellectual disabilities, has been a longtime advocate for people with disabilities.

President George W. Bush appointed Brett to the President's Committee for People with Intellectual Disabilities, with Brett serving from 2002 into 2006. In May 2011, President Barack Obama named Brett the committee's chairman. His tenure as chair lasted into 2013. Brett rejoined the committee in 2014, when Obama appointed him to again serve as a member. He continued to serve on the committee into the Trump administration. In March 2022, President Joe Biden named Brett to again serve as a member of the commission. That June, Biden selected him to again serve as chairman of the committee. Biden also had Brett travel as part of the official delegation he appointed to represent the United States government at the 2023 Special Olympics World Summer Games in Berlin.

On May 12, 2016, the U.S. House of Representatives appointed Brett to the National Council on Disability, with Brett being nominated by Democratic House Minority Leader Nancy Pelosi. During part of his tenure, Brett has been the council's vice chairman.

Brett has also served as chair of the Massachusetts Disabled Persons Protection Commission, the Massachusetts Intellectual Disability Commission, and chair of the Massachusetts' Governor’s Commission on Intellectual Disability.

== Other work ==
Brett formerly served as the president of the board of directors of the Massachusetts Association for Mental Health. Brett as served on the advisory councils of the Robert F. Kennedy Children’s Action Corps and the New England Center for Children. As of 2024 he was a current trustee of the John F. Kennedy Presidential Library and Museum, which he has served on for many years. He also served on the board of trustees of St. John’s Seminary and the advisory board of the Irish International Immigrant Center.

Brett served as the co-host of D.C. Dialogue, a public affairs program broadcast monthly on New England Cable News.

== Recognition ==
As of 2024, Brett has received a total of nineteen honorary degrees. This includes an honorary doctorate from Beacon College, and honorary degrees from Franklin Pierce University and Merrimack College.

In 2018, the Massachusetts Association for Mental Health awarded Brett the Michael and Kitty Dukakis Lifetime Achievement Award. In 2023, Brett was the first-ever recipient of the Cultural Centre of Greater Boston's Brian J Donnelly Award. Brett has also received Action for Boston Community Development’s Lifetime Public Service Award, Massachusetts Special Olympics' Distinguished Leadership Award, and Hospice of Boston's Humanitarian of the Year Award, and in 2014 was bestowed the Disability Law Center's Edward M. Kennedy Leadership Award.

In 1996, in honor of Brett, Bay Cove Human Services of Boston named a community home serving disabled adults "Brett House". In 2021, EP Magazine (formerly Exceptional Parent Magazine) named Brett to the "50 for 50 Advocate Heroes" list compiled for the publication's 50th anniversary. In 2013, the University of Massachusetts Boston established an endowed chair named for Brett. The James T. Brett Chair in Disability and Workforce Development is the only endowed chair in disability and workforce development in the United States, the nation's only endowed chair for disability and workforce development. In 2014, he was inducted into the Special Olympics Massachusetts Hall of Fame.

Brett has received numerous honors recognizing him as a successful member of the Irish American community and the global Irish diaspora. The Central Remedial Clinic of Dublin, Ireland bestowed Brett with an "Appreciation Award" in 1991, and with its "Irish Person of the Year" honor in 1994. In 1991, Brett received the "John Boyle O'Reilly Award" from the New England chapter of the Irish American Labor Coalition. In 1993, Brett received the "Irishman of the Year" honor from Friends of the Kennedy Library. Irishman of the Year award. In 1994, Brett received a "Man of Year" award from the Boston Police Department Emerald Society. Irish America magazine has named Brett to its "Business 100" in years such as 2005, 2007, 2023, and 2024. In 2018, the Éire Society of Boston presented its Gold Medal award to Brett. He has also received honors from the Charitable Irish Society of Boston, Sligo Association of Boston, and Boston Irish Business Association.

Brett has been bestowed with papal honors, having been named a Knight of Malta and Knight Grand Cross of the Equestrian Order of the Holy Sepulchre of Jerusalem.

== Electoral history ==
=== Boston City Council ===
1979 Boston City Council election
Candidates	Preliminary election		General election	
Candidates	Votes	%	Votes	%
Lawrence DiCara (incumbent)	42,339	6.50	69,102	8.15
Christopher A. Iannella (incumbent)	45,184	6.94	69,069	8.15
Raymond Flynn (incumbent)	45,648	7.01	66,662	7.86
Frederick C. Langone (incumbent)	48,063	7.38	64,873	'7.65
Dapper O'Neil (incumbent)	48,781	7.49	60,846	7.17
Joseph M. Tierney (incumbent)	43,759	6.72	58,674	6.92
John W. Sears	41,108	6.31	58,205	6.87
Rosemarie E. Sansone (incumbent)	46,391	7.12	57,552	6.79
Patrick F. McDonough (incumbent)	34,646	5.32	55,123	6.50
Louise Day Hicks (incumbent)	44,659	6.86	54,714	6.45
James T. Brett	34,941	5.37	51,767	6.11
Terence P. McDermott	30,124	4.63	39,882	4.70
Barbara A. Ware	19,519	2.30	33,951	4.01
Stephen C. Farrell	20,173	3.10	27,038	3.19
Charles Yancey	14,487	2.22	22,301	2.63
Edward Brooks	19,772	3.04	24,165	2.85
Richard M. Lane	17,424	2.68	17,771	2.10
David Joseph McKay	12,873	1.98	15,981	1.89
Jeannette L. Tracy	11,711	1.80		
Phyllis Igoe	9,205	1.41		
Stephen Michael Cidlevich	8,645	1.33		
Eugene A. Cavicchi	6,626	1.02		
Peter K. Hadley	5,187	0.80		

=== Massachusetts House ===
1981

1981 Massachusetts House of Representatives 14th Suffolk district special Democratic primary
Party	Candidate	Votes	%
Democratic	James T. Brett	1,322	19.6
Democratic	James W. Hunt Jr.	989	14.6
Democratic	Michael J. Traft	781	11.6
Democratic	Ronald MacGillivray	679	10.1
Democratic	Robert M. Sullivan	616	9.1
Democratic	Paul J. Harrington	575	8.5
Democratic	Stephen J. Graham	500	7.4
Democratic	Daniel Fitzgerald	449	6.7
Democratic	James B. McDonough	313	4.6
Democratic	William Fleming	247	3.7
Democratic	Paul D. Seaver	210	3.1
Democratic	Maria Waldron	68	1.0
write-in	scattering	2	0.03
Total votes		6,752	100

1981 Massachusetts House of Representatives 14th Suffolk district special election
Party	Candidate	Votes	%
Democratic	James T. Brett	2,095	73.5
Republican	Karen L. MacNutt	668	23.4
Independent	Franklin H. Chassen	105	3.7
Total votes		2,749	100

1982

1982 Massachusetts House of Representatives 14th Suffolk district Democratic primary
Party	Candidate	Votes	%
Democratic	James T. Brett (incumbent)	5,242	100
Total votes		5,242	100

1982 Massachusetts House of Representatives 14th Suffolk district general election
Party	Candidate	Votes	%
Democratic	James T. Brett (incumbent)	6,309	100
Total votes		6,309	100

1984

1984 Massachusetts House of Representatives 14th Suffolk district Democratic primary
Party	Candidate	Votes	%
Democratic	James T. Brett (incumbent)	4,350	88.5
Democratic	William J. Curran	565	11.5
Total votes		4,915	100

1984 Massachusetts House of Representatives 14th Suffolk district general election
Party	Candidate	Votes	%
Democratic	James T. Brett (incumbent)	8,604	100
Total votes		8,604	100

1986

1986 Massachusetts House of Representatives 14th Suffolk district Democratic primary
Party	Candidate	Votes	%
Democratic	James T. Brett (incumbent)	4,282	100
Total votes		4,282	100

1986 Massachusetts House of Representatives 14th Suffolk district general election
Party	Candidate	Votes	%
Democratic	James T. Brett (incumbent)	5,989	100
Total votes		5,989	100

1990

1990 Massachusetts House of Representatives 14th Suffolk district Democratic primary
Party	Candidate	Votes	%
Democratic	James T. Brett (incumbent)	5,920	100
Total votes		5,920	100

1990 Massachusetts House of Representatives 14th Suffolk district general election
Party	Candidate	Votes	%
Democratic	James T. Brett (incumbent)	8,182	75.0
Republican	Michael Trzcinski	2,718	24.9
write-in	scattering	5	0.0
Total votes		10,905	100

1992

1992 Massachusetts House of Representatives 14th Suffolk district Democratic primary
Party	Candidate	Votes	%
Democratic	James T. Brett (incumbent)	3,981	100
Total votes		3,981	100

1992 Massachusetts House of Representatives 14th Suffolk district Democratic general election
Party	Candidate	Votes	%
Democratic	James T. Brett (incumbent)	9,411	100
Total votes		9,411	100

1994

1994 Massachusetts House of Representatives 13th Suffolk district Democratic primary
Party	Candidate	Votes	%
Democratic	James T. Brett (incumbent)	4,106	100
Total votes		4,106	100

1994 Massachusetts House of Representatives 13th Suffolk district Democratic general election
Party	Candidate	Votes	%
Democratic	James T. Brett (incumbent)	7,666	100
write-in	scattering	7,666	0.0
Total votes		7,668	100

1996

1996 Massachusetts House of Representatives 13th Suffolk district primary
Party	Candidate	Votes	%
Democratic	James T. Brett (incumbent)	1,584	91.7
Write-in	Others	144	8.3
Total votes		1,728	100

1996 Massachusetts House of Representatives 13th Suffolk district general election
Party	Candidate	Votes	%
Democratic	James T. Brett (withdrawn)	4,145	48.04
Write-in	Marty Walsh	1,953	22.63
Write-in	Charles Tevnan	492	9.82
Write-in	Others	2,039	23.63
Total votes		8,629	100

=== Boston mayor ===
1993 Boston mayoral election
Candidates	Preliminary election		General election	
Candidates	Votes	%	Votes	%
Thomas Menino (acting incumbent)	30,060	26.89	74,448	64.45
James T. Brett	25,052	22.41	41,052	35.54
Robert Rufo	22,517	20.14		
Rosaria Salerno	19,605	17.54		
Bruce Bolling	6,564	5.87		
Christopher Lydon	3,630	3.25		
Francis Roache	3,362	3.01		
Diane Moriarty	991	0.89		

Preceded by John J. Finnegan	Member of the Massachusetts House of Representatives from 13th Suffolk district 1981–1995	Succeeded by Angelo Scaccia
Preceded by Thomas Finneran	Member of the Massachusetts House of Representatives from 14th Suffolk district 1995–1996	Succeeded by Marty Walsh
