= Jessica Giannino =

American politician

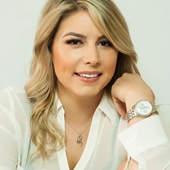

Member of the Massachusetts House of Representatives from the 16th Suffolk district
- Incumbent
- Assumed office January 6, 2021
- Preceded by: RoseLee Vincent

Personal details
- Party: Democratic
- Education: Salem State University (BA)

Jessica Ann Giannino is a State representative for Revere in the Massachusetts House of Representatives. She was elected to the Massachusetts house in 2020. She served as Revere city councilor at large since 2012. She graduated from Revere High School. Her district of 16th Suffolk includes Revere: Ward 1: Precinct 3, Ward 3, Ward 4, and Ward 6; Saugus: Precincts 3, 10 (Essex Co.) Gianinno won a two-way Democratic primary in 2020, the previous representative RoseLee Vincent was retiring.

== Committees ==
- Joint Committee on Economic Development and Emerging Technologies
- Joint Committee on Election Laws
- Joint Committee on Environment, Natural Resources and Agriculture

== See also ==
- 2021–2022 Massachusetts legislature
