= 1979 Boston City Council election =

- November 6, 1979

The Boston City Council election was held on November 6, 1979, with preliminary elections on September 25, 1979.

== Candidates ==
All nine incumbents (Lawrence DiCara, Raymond Flynn, Louise Day Hicks, Christopher A. Iannella, Frederick C. Langone, Patrick F. McDonough, Dapper O'Neil, Rosemarie E. Sansone, and Joseph M. Tierney), ran for reelection.

=== Elected ===
- Lawrence DiCara, member of the Boston City Council since 1972.
- Raymond Flynn, member of the Boston City Council since 1978. Member of the Massachusetts House of Representatives from 1971 to 1979.
- Christopher A. Iannella, member of the Boston City Council since 1970. Previously served on the council from 1958 to 1968.
- Frederick C. Langone, member of the Boston City Council since 1973, previously served from 1964 to 1971 and in 1961.
- Patrick F. McDonough, member of the Boston City Council since 1972. Previously served on the council from 1956 to 1964 and 1966 to 1970.
- Dapper O'Neil, member of the Boston City Council since 1971.
- John W. Sears, former chairman of the Massachusetts Republican Party (1975–1976), Metropolitan District Commissioner (1970–1975), Sheriff of Suffolk County (1968–1969), and member of the Massachusetts House of Representatives (1965–1968)
- Rosemarie E. Sansone, member of the Boston City Council since 1978
- Joseph M. Tierney, member of the Boston City Council since 1972.

=== Lost in general election ===
- James T. Brett, account manager for New England Telephone.
- Edward Brooks, Boston State College student and community organizer.
- Stephen C. Farrell, private consultant and former staff member under mayor Kevin White.
- Louise Day Hicks, member of the Boston City Council since 1979 and previously from 1970 to 1971 and 1974 to 1978. Former member of the United States House of Representatives (1971–1973) and Boston School Committee (1961–1970).
- Terence P. McDermott, attorney.
- David Joseph McKay, assistant English teacher at St Gregory's High School.
- Richard M. Lane, former Suffolk County assistant district attorney.
- Barbara A. Ware, legislative aide to state senator Bill Owens.
- Charles Yancey, director of administration for the Massachusetts Office of Communities and Development from 1978 to 1979.

=== Eliminated in preliminary election ===
- Eugene A. Cavicchi, youth counselor.
- Stephen Michael Cidlevich, legislative assistant.
- Peter K. Hadley, consulting engineer. Member of the Libertarian Party.
- Phyllis Igoe, traffic supervisor for the Boston Police Department.
- Jeannette L. Tracy, computer programmer and pro-choice and antiwar activist. Member of the Socialist Workers Party.

== Results ==
The top 18 candidates in the preliminary election moved on to the November general election. The top nine candidates in the November election were seated on the city council.

| Candidates | Preliminary election | | General election | |
| Candidates | Votes | % | Votes | % |
|---|---|---|---|---|
| Lawrence DiCara (incumbent) | 42,339 | 6.50 | 69,102 | 8.15 |
| Christopher A. Iannella (incumbent) | 45,184 | 6.94 | 69,069 | 8.15 |
| Raymond Flynn (incumbent) | 45,648 | 7.01 | 66,662 | 7.86 |
| Frederick C. Langone (incumbent) | 48,063 | 7.38 | 64,873 | '7.65 |
| Dapper O'Neil (incumbent) | 48,781 | 7.49 | 60,846 | 7.17 |
| Joseph M. Tierney (incumbent) | 43,759 | 6.72 | 58,674 | 6.92 |
| John W. Sears | 41,108 | 6.31 | 58,205 | 6.87 |
| Rosemarie E. Sansone (incumbent) | 46,391 | 7.12 | 57,552 | 6.79 |
| Patrick F. McDonough (incumbent) | 34,646 | 5.32 | 55,123 | 6.50 |
| Louise Day Hicks (incumbent) | 44,659 | 6.86 | 54,714 | 6.45 |
| James T. Brett | 34,941 | 5.37 | 51,767 | 6.11 |
| Terence P. McDermott | 30,124 | 4.63 | 39,882 | 4.70 |
| Barbara A. Ware | 19,519 | 2.30 | 33,951 | 4.01 |
| Stephen C. Farrell | 20,173 | 3.10 | 27,038 | 3.19 |
| Charles Yancey | 14,487 | 2.22 | 22,301 | 2.63 |
| Edward Brooks | 19,772 | 3.04 | 24,165 | 2.85 |
| Richard M. Lane | 17,424 | 2.68 | 17,771 | 2.10 |
| David Joseph McKay | 12,873 | 1.98 | 15,981 | 1.89 |
| Jeannette L. Tracy | 11,711 | 1.80 | | |
| Phyllis Igoe | 9,205 | 1.41 | | |
| Stephen Michael Cidlevich | 8,645 | 1.33 | | |
| Eugene A. Cavicchi | 6,626 | 1.02 | | |
| Peter K. Hadley | 5,187 | 0.80 | | |
