= Katherine Kane (politician) =

American politician (1935–2024)

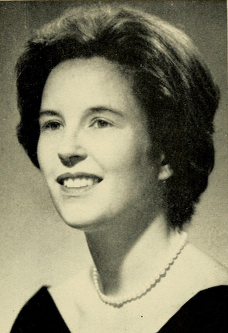

Member of the Massachusetts House of Representatives from the 3rd Suffolk district
- In office 1965–1968

Personal details
- Born: Katherine Fitzhugh Daniels; April 12, 1935 Indianapolis, Indiana, U.S.
- Died: October 13, 2013 (aged 78)
- Spouse: Louis Isaac Kane (m. 1957; died 2000)
- Children: 3
- Education: Smith College (BA)

Katherine Fitzhugh Daniels Kane (April 12, 1935 – October 13, 2013) was an American Democratic politician from Boston, Massachusetts. The daughter of Indianapolis lawyer Joseph J. Daniels, she married Louis Isaac Kane in 1957; her husband would acquire Au Bon Pain in 1978. She represented the 3rd Suffolk district in the Massachusetts House of Representatives from 1965 to 1968, and later served as deputy mayor of Boston from 1975 to 1983. She died on October 13, 2013.
