= Jay Livingstone =

American politician

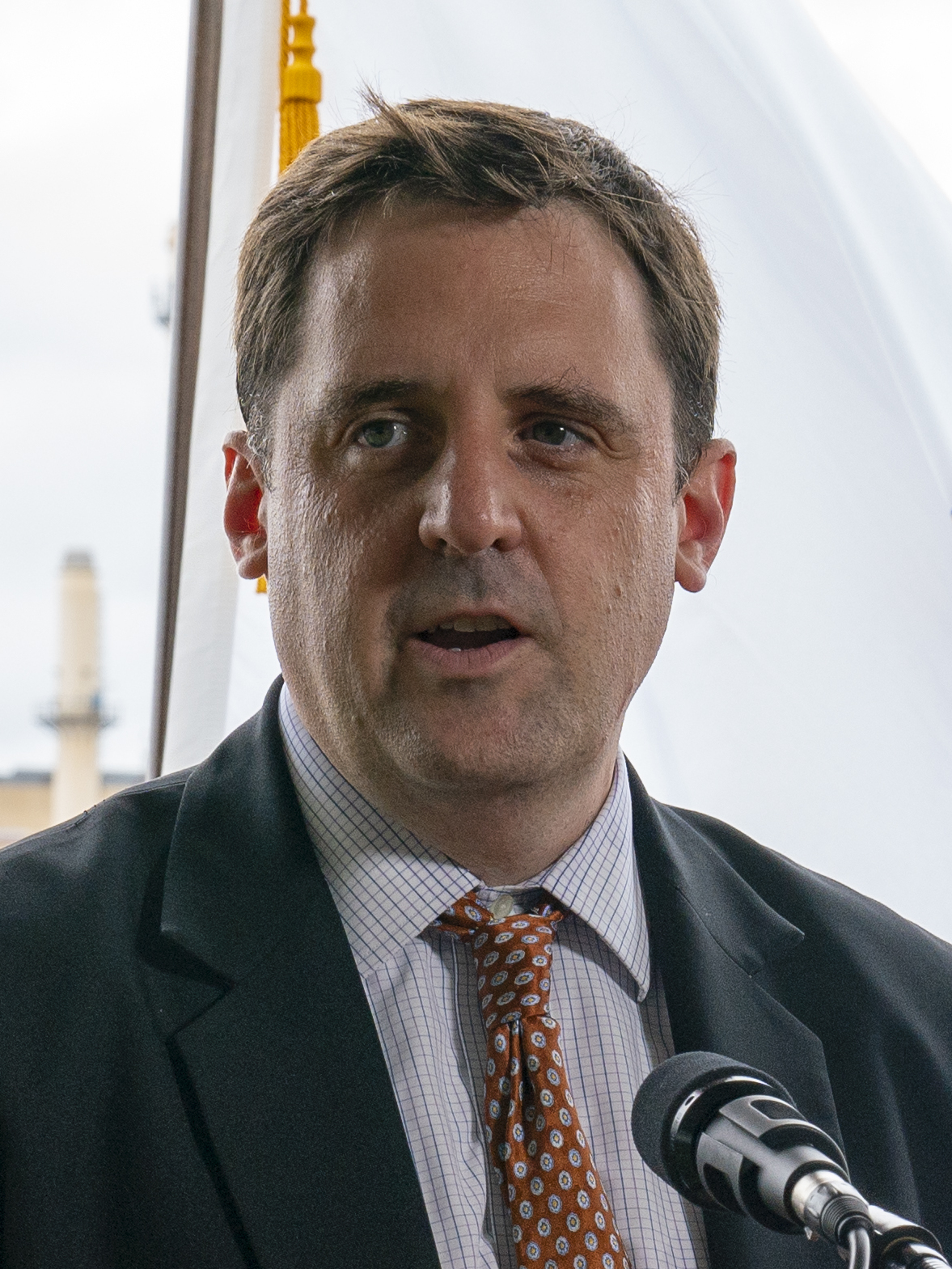
- Livingstone in 2018

Member of the Massachusetts House of Representatives from the 8th Suffolk district
- Incumbent
- Assumed office July 17, 2013
- Preceded by: Martha M. Walz

Personal details
- Born: Norwood, Massachusetts, U.S.
- Party: Democratic
- Education: University of Connecticut (BA); George Washington University (JD)
- Website: jaylivingstone.com

Jay D. Livingstone is an American lawyer and politician who has served in the Massachusetts House of Representatives since July 2013. He is a resident of Back Bay, Boston, a member of the Democratic Party. He won a special election to succeed Martha M. Walz, unopposed in the June 25 general election after winning the May 28 primary. He was sworn in July 17, 2013. He has since won re-election in 2014, 2016, 2018, 2020, 2022, and 2024.

Jay was educated in North Attleboro's public schools and worked as a cashier at the town pharmacy while in high school. He was a union factory worker while attending UConn, where he majored in political science and history and graduated with honors. He attended George Washington School of Law and graduated with high honors.

Livingstone was raised in North Attleboro, MA. He has practiced law since 1998, working in public and private practice. He currently serves as of counsel at the law firm of Regan Strom, P.C. Jay Livingstone served as an adjunct professor at Northeastern Law School from August 2009 through June 2013.

== Committee Assignments ==
For the 2025-26 Session, Livingstone sits on the following committees in the House:

- Chairperson, Joint Committee on Children, Families and Persons with Disabilities

== See also ==
- 2019–2020 Massachusetts legislature
- 2021–2022 Massachusetts legislature
- 2023–2024 Massachusetts legislature
