= 1993 Boston mayoral election =

Election in Massachusetts, United States

- November 2, 1993
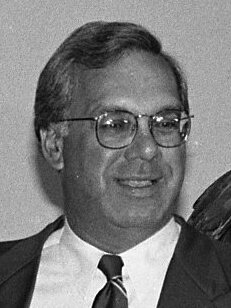

Candidate	Thomas Menino	James T. Brett
Party	Nonpartisan	Nonpartisan
Popular vote	74,448	41,052
Percentage	64.45%	35.54%
- Results by ward Menino: 50–60% 60–70% 70–80% Brett: 50–60% 60–70%
Mayor before election
Thomas Menino (acting)
Elected mayor
Thomas Menino

The Boston mayoral election of 1993 occurred on Tuesday, November 2, 1993, between Acting Mayor Thomas Menino and State Representative James T. Brett. Menino was elected to his first term.

This early election came just two years after the prior mayoral election in 1991. This was because Raymond Flynn, who had been mayor of Boston since 1984, resigned as mayor to become United States ambassador to the Holy See. Following Flynn's resignation in July 1993, Boston City Council president Menino became acting mayor until a permanent successor to Flynn would be elected.

The nonpartisan municipal preliminary election was held on September 21, 1993.

Menino became the city's first Italian American mayor and the first mayor not of Irish descent since 1930.

== Candidates ==
=== Candidates that advanced to general election ===
- James T. Brett, Member of the Massachusetts House of Representatives since 1981, Assistant Secretary of Energy from 1980 to 1981
- Thomas Menino, Acting Mayor of Boston since July 12, 1993, Boston City Councilor from 1984 to 1993, and Council President in 1993

=== Candidates eliminated in preliminary ===
- Bruce Bolling, Boston City Councilor since 1982, council president (1986–1987)
- Christopher Lydon, WGBH-TV host
- Diane Moriarty, attorney and Republican Party member
- Francis Roache, former Boston Police Commissioner
- Robert Rufo, Sheriff of Suffolk County
- Rosaria Salerno, Boston City Councilor since 1988

== Campaigning ==
The nonpartisan primary lacked a clear front-runner, and was described by Virginia A. Triant of The Harvard Crimson as, "one the decade's most competitive mayoral races [in Boston]." Key matters of discussion on the campaign trail were included crime, education, and employment. The campaign saw the candidates agree with each other on many issues. All candidates promised to crackdown on crime and improve the city's troubled public school system. Racial issues did not prove to be a major matter in the campaign. The tone of the campaign was peaceful, with Sara Rimer of The New York Times writing that the primary had been a, "strikingly civil, some might even say dull, campaign waged in a city with a history of truculent politics."

The Harvard Crimson, ahead of the primary, characterized there as being two-tiers of candidate support indicated in opinion polls. The top tier (with the strongest support in polls) featured Menino, Brett, Rufo, and Salerno (in no particular order). The second-tier (receiving lower levels of support in polls) featured Bolling, Lydon, Roache, and Mortiarty (in no particular order).

=== Menino campaign ===
Menino initially ran a low-profile campaign, having informally indicated his intentions ahead of taking office as acting mayor. During this time, he quietly raised significant amounts in contributions for his campaign. After taking office as acting mayor, Menino ran a sort of "Rose Garden campaign" that played up his acting incumbency and used the perks of the office. His campaign was seen as greatly benefiting from his incumbency. He formally declared himself as a candidate for mayor on August 16, 1993, after many other candidates had already formally entered the race.

Menino was regarded to be a political liberal. Menino was one of three Italian American candidates running in the primary. The city had never had an Italian American mayor.

In the primary, Menino's base of support was regarded to be East Boston, South Boston, and West Roxbury, all of which had high turnout in the primary. His victory in the general election came largely due to the support of a coalition of black voters, latino voters, and liberal-leaning white voters. He performed more weakly in several perennially high-turnout areas of the city that many previous mayors had relied on for election, such as South Boston, West Roxbury, and Charlestown In his subsequent elections, Menino would retain his strong support among the city's black voters, despite occasionally being at political odds with black elected officials on the Boston City Council and in the state legislature.

=== Brett campaign ===
Brett highlighted his Irish-American roots and his personal links to former mayor Flynn, noting that his mother (who had immigrated from Ireland) had once been employed alongside Flynn's own mother as a custodial worker. Like Menino, Brett was regarded to be politically liberal. An exception to Brett's generally liberal politics was that he held anti-abortion stances.

Brett was one of four Irish-American candidates running in the primary. The city had seen an uninterrupted stretch of Irish-American mayors ever since 1930.

=== Salerno campaign ===
Ahead of the primary, Salerno had been seen as one of the front-runners to advance to the general election, with polls placing her in the upper-tier among candidates. Boston had never elected a woman as its mayor (Boston would ultimately not do so until electing Michelle Wu in 2021), and Salerno cited enthusiasm at the prospect of electing the city's first female mayor (if she won) as a major drawing point in attracting volunteers to her campaign.

=== Rufo campaign ===
Rufo ran with the campaign slogan "safety first". Polls showed strong support for Rufo ahead of the campaign, causing him to be deemed one of the front-runners to advance to the general election. Rufo's strongest base of support was regarded to be in the Allston and Brighton neighborhoods, which ultimately saw lower turnout in the primary. The lower turnout in key constituencies for him was regarded to have played a key role in his failure to advance to the general election.

=== Bolling campaign ===
Bolling was the only African American candidate in the election. Bolling was not polling strongly ahead of the primary, and was therefore not considered a front-runner.

=== Roache campaign ===
One of Roache's proposals was to pressure universities into contributing greater amounts to the city (in lieu for the taxes they were exempted from paying) Roache was not polling strongly ahead of the primary, and was therefore not considered a front-runner.

=== Lyndon campaign ===
Lyndon was not polling strongly ahead of the primary, and was therefore not considered a front-runner.

=== Mortiarty campaign ===
Moriarty's campaign was regarded to be a long-shot. This was her first time seeking political office. While the election was a nonpartisan ballot, she was the only of the eight candidates who was a member of the Republican (the rest being members of the Democratic Party).

== Preliminary election ==
=== Preliminary results ===
Placing first and second in the primary, respectively, Menino and Brett advanced to the general election. Despite inclement weather on election day, turnout in the primary was over 50% of eligible voters.

Menino was said to have benefited from high voter turnout East Boston, South Boston, and West Roxbury, which were regarded as part of his "home base" of support. Rufo was said to have been hurt by low turnout in his "home base" of Allston and Brighton.

1993 Boston Mayoral election
Primary election
Party	Candidate	Votes	%
Nonpartisan	Thomas Menino (acting incumbent)	30,060	26.89
Nonpartisan	James T. Brett	25,052	22.41
Nonpartisan	Robert Rufo	22,517	20.14
Nonpartisan	Rosaria Salerno	19,605	17.54
Nonpartisan	Bruce Bolling	6,464	5.87
Nonpartisan	Christopher Lydon	3,630	3.25
Nonpartisan	Francis Roache	3,362	3.08
Nonpartisan	Diane Moriarty	991	0.89
Total votes		111,781	100

== General election ==
=== General election endorsements ===
Thomas Menino

State officials

- Mel King, state representative and candidate for mayor in 1983

Newspapers and publications

- Boston Herald
- The Boston Globe

=== General election results ===
1993 Boston mayoral general election
Party	Candidate	Votes	%
Nonpartisan	Thomas Menino (acting incumbent)	74,448	64.45
Nonpartisan	James T. Brett	41,052	35.54
Total votes		111,500	100

== See also ==
- List of mayors of Boston, Massachusetts
