= Martha M. Walz =

American politician

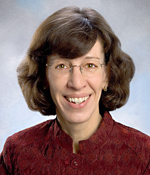
- Official portrait, circa 2007

Member of the Massachusetts House of Representatives from the Eighth Suffolk district
- In office January 2005 – February 2013
- Preceded by: Paul C. Demakis
- Succeeded by: Jay Livingstone

Personal details
- Born: July 7, 1961 (age 65) Rochester, New York, U.S.
- Party: Democratic
- Education: Colgate University (BA); New York University School of Law (JD); John F. Kennedy School of Government (MPA)
- Profession: Attorney
- Website: http://www.martywalz.com/

Martha M. "Marty" Walz (born July 7, 1961) is a former member of the Massachusetts House of Representatives who served from January 2005 to February 2013. Walz, a Democrat, represented the Eighth Suffolk district, which is made up out of Back Bay, Beacon Hill, and the West End in Boston and Cambridgeport, Area 4 and MIT in Cambridge.

== Early life and education ==
Walz was born in Rochester, New York and went to college at Colgate University in Madison County, New York where she graduated with a Bachelor of Arts in history in 1983. In the fall of 1984, Walz started law school at New York University School of Law where she obtained her Juris Doctor in 1987.

== Career ==
After her graduation from New York University of Law, Walz moved to Boston, Massachusetts where she worked at the law firm of Palmer & Dodge until 1992. Later that year, Walz worked for Harcourt General, Inc., where she managed the company's global labor and employment law practice for a period of seven years. Walz became assistant director of human resources for the Boston Public Schools in 2000 and continued to work in this position until 2003. Prior to her run for office, Walz was the vice president of development at Jumpstart for Young Children, a national nonprofit based in Boston that pairs college students with preschool children who are at risk of entering school unprepared for success.

In 2000, Walz graduated from the John F. Kennedy School of Government with a Master of Public Administration (MPA).

=== Massachusetts House of Representatives ===
In 2004 Walz announced that she was running in the Democratic State Primary to be a candidate for election to the Eighth Suffolk District of the Massachusetts House of Representatives. On September 14, 2004, in her first bid for elective office, Walz won the Democratic nomination for the Massachusetts House of Representatives, winning every precinct in the district. Walz won the nomination over Kristine Glynn by 1,383 votes. In that primary 2,211 votes were cast for Walz vs. 828 for Glynn.

On November, 2nd of 2004, Walz was elected to the Massachusetts House of Representatives defeating her opponent, Republican Richard L. Babson. Walz garnered 12,156 votes to 3,724 for Babson.

==== Electoral history ====
Walz ran for a fourth term against the Republican Party nominee, Brad Marston, and won with approximately 77% of the vote. She declared her victory by updating her Facebook status fifty minutes after the polls closed.

==== Legislative record ====
As a representative, Walz was one of the lead sponsors of a 2007 bill creating a buffer zone around Massachusetts abortion clinics. A suit challenging the law was due to be heard in the U.S. Supreme Court in January, 2014.

==== Resignation ====
On January 30, 2013, Walz announced that she would resign from the House of Representatives in mid-February to become the president and chief executive officer of the Planned Parenthood League of Massachusetts and the president of the Planned Parenthood Advocacy Fund of Massachusetts. On June 25, 2013, Beacon Hill attorney Jay Livingstone won a special election to succeed her.

=== Planned Parenthood ===
Walz became the president and chief executive officer of the Planned Parenthood League of Massachusetts and the president of the Planned Parenthood Advocacy Fund of Massachusetts on March 4, 2013. On January 28, 2015, she resigned from these positions.
