= Robert L. Fortes =

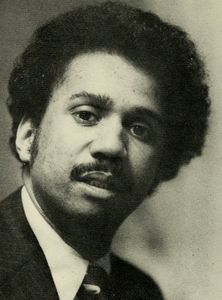

Member of the Massachusetts House of Representatives from the 16th Suffolk district
- In office 1975–1979
- Preceded by: Robert F. Donovan
- Succeeded by: Michael Paul Feeney (redistricted from 21st Suffolk)

Personal details
- Born: Robert L. Fortes; May 26, 1942 New Haven, Connecticut, United States
- Died: September 15, 1979 (aged 37) Boston, Massachusetts, United States
- Party: Democratic
- Children: 2
- Education: Southern Connecticut State University

Robert L. Fortes (May 26, 1942 – September 15, 1979) was an American community leader and politician. He was born and raised in Connecticut and moved to Boston in 1965, where he became a leader in the city's black community. He served two terms in the Massachusetts House of Representatives and was associate executive director of the United South End Settlements.

== Early life ==
Fortes was born on May 26, 1942, in New Haven, Connecticut. He graduated from Wilbur Cross High School and Southern Connecticut State University.

== Boston ==
In 1965, Fortes moved to Boston to become the director of the United South End Settlements' Harriet Tubman House. He left the USES in 1968 to become the executive director of the Roxbury Federation of Neighborhood Centers, but returned three years later to become USES' associate executives director of administration.

Fortes represented the 16th Suffolk district in the Massachusetts House of Representatives from 1975 to 1979. In 1977 he was elected chairman of the Massachusetts Black Legislative Caucus. In 1978, Fortes' district was impacted by redistricting and the reduction in the size of House of Representatives. He chose to challenge incumbent Bill Owens in the Massachusetts Senate's 2nd Suffolk district, but later withdrew from the race.

On September 15, 1979, Fortes died unexpectedly after a heart attack. He was 37 years old
