= William Reinstein =

American politician

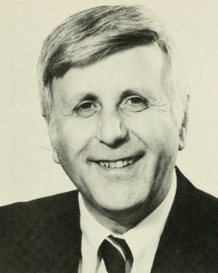
- Portrait of William Reinstein

Member of the Massachusetts House of Representatives
- In office 1987–1998
- Preceded by: Angelo Cataldo
- Succeeded by: Kathi-Anne Reinstein

Mayor of Revere, Massachusetts
- In office 1972–1978
- Preceded by: George Colella
- Succeeded by: George Colella

Member of the Massachusetts House of Representatives from the 17th Suffolk District
- In office 1969–1973
- Preceded by: ^{1}
- Succeeded by: Angelo Cataldo

Personal details
- Born: March 26, 1939 Revere, Massachusetts
- Died: May 15, 1998 (aged 59) Boston, Massachusetts
- Party: Democratic
- Spouse: Maureen Reinstein
- Children: Kathi-Anne Reinstein; William Reinstein, Jr.
- Education: Revere High School
- Occupation: Insurance adjuster Politician

William G. Reinstein was an American politician who served as a member of the Massachusetts House of Representatives and Mayor of Revere, Massachusetts.

== Early life ==
Reinstein was born on March 26, 1939, in Revere, Massachusetts. He graduated from Revere High School and attended Bentley College and Boston University.

== Political career ==
=== Early career ===
In 1963, Reinstein began his political career at the age of 23 by running for the Revere School Committee. He topped the ticket in his first election. In 1968 he was elected to the City Council. He also served on the Regional Vocational School Committee from 1966 to 1969.

In 1968, Reinstein was elected to the Massachusetts House of Representatives. In March 1969 he introduced a controversial bill that would have made dealing heroin a capital crime.

In 1971, Reinstein ran for Mayor of Revere. He finished first in a four-way primary race and defeated three-term incumbent George Colella 11,356 votes to 9,394 in the general election. He was reelected twice, defeating City Councilor Joseph Del Grosso in 1973 and Gerald Esposito in 1975.

In 1974, Reinstein ran in the special election to succeed the deceased Torbert Macdonald as the U.S. representative from Massachusetts's 7th district. He finished sixth in a twelve-candidate Democratic primary that was won by state representative Ed Markey.

=== Indictment and trials ===
In 1976 Reinstein was indicted for bribery and perjury after a yearlong investigation into alleged kickbacks during the construction of Revere High School. A mistrial was declared on November 24, 1978, after a major prosecution witness was unable to complete his testimony. The witness complained of feeling ill during his testimony and was later diagnosed with cancer. He died before the case was retried. Reinstein's retrial was also declared a mistrial after a full-page advertisement in a North Shore magazine suggested that Reinstein's rights were being trampled on and that he was the object of a "political vendetta." The judge found this ad to be a "direct breach of the understanding and commitment which has led to ... an unsequestered jury." The third trial ended on February 9, 1982, with Reinstein being acquitted of all charges.

=== Later political career ===
In 1983, Reinstein returned to politics as a candidate for City Councilor at Large. He finished second in an election in which the top five candidates were elected with 6398 votes.

In 1986, Reinstein challenged incumbent state representative Angelo Cataldo. He defeated Cataldo 4,586 votes to 4,039 in the Democratic primary. During his tenure in the state house, Reinstein was a supporter of the death penalty and opposed abortions with exceptions of rape and incest. He remained in the House until his death on May 15, 1998. He was succeeded by his daughter Kathi-Anne Reinstein.

== See also ==
- Massachusetts House of Representatives' 16th Suffolk district

== Notes ==
The district sent two representatives to the House at this time. Reinstein and Joseph Del Grosso were preceded by Joseph DiCarlo and Raymond Edward Carey.
