= Kathi-Anne Reinstein =

American politician

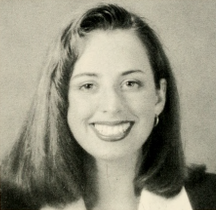
- Kathi Anne Reinstein in 2003

Member of the Massachusetts House of Representatives
- In office January 6, 1999 – January 17, 2014
- Preceded by: William Reinstein
- Succeeded by: RoseLee Vincent

Personal details
- Relations: William Reinstein (father)

Kathi-Anne Reinstein is a former American state legislator who served in the Massachusetts House of Representatives from 1999 to 2014. She is a Revere resident and a member of the Democratic Party. She resigned to become a lobbyist for Boston Beer Company.

Reinstein supported legislation that would make the peanut butter and marshmallow creme sandwich Fluffernutter the official state sandwich for Massachusetts. The measure failed, and Reinstein tried again unsuccessfully in 2009. Supporters of the bill cited the sandwich's close association with childhood and Massachusetts.

== See also ==
- Massachusetts House of Representatives' 16th Suffolk district
