= Massachusetts House of Representatives' 8th Suffolk district =

American legislative district

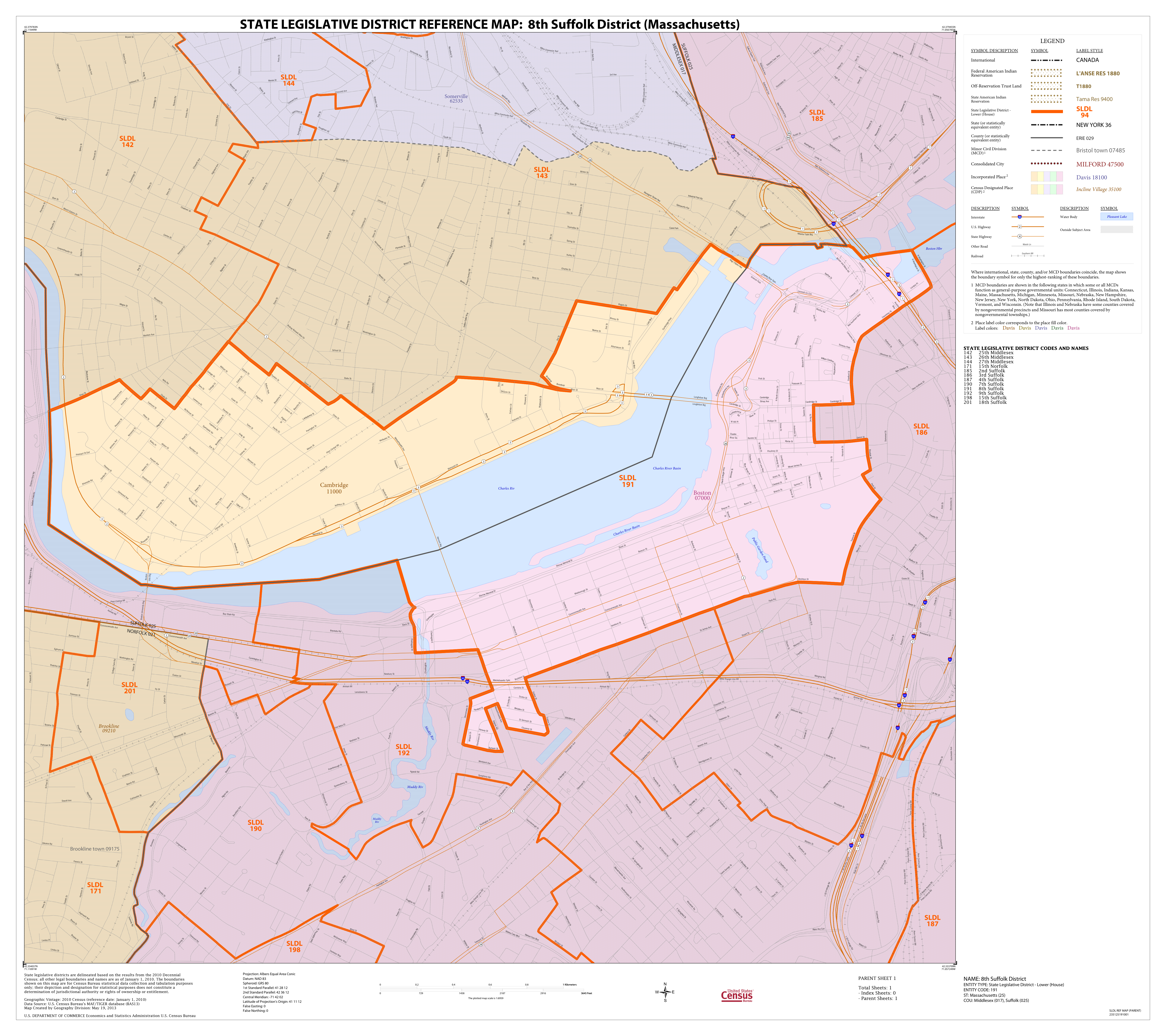
Map of Massachusetts House of Representatives' 8th Suffolk district, based on the 2010 United States census.

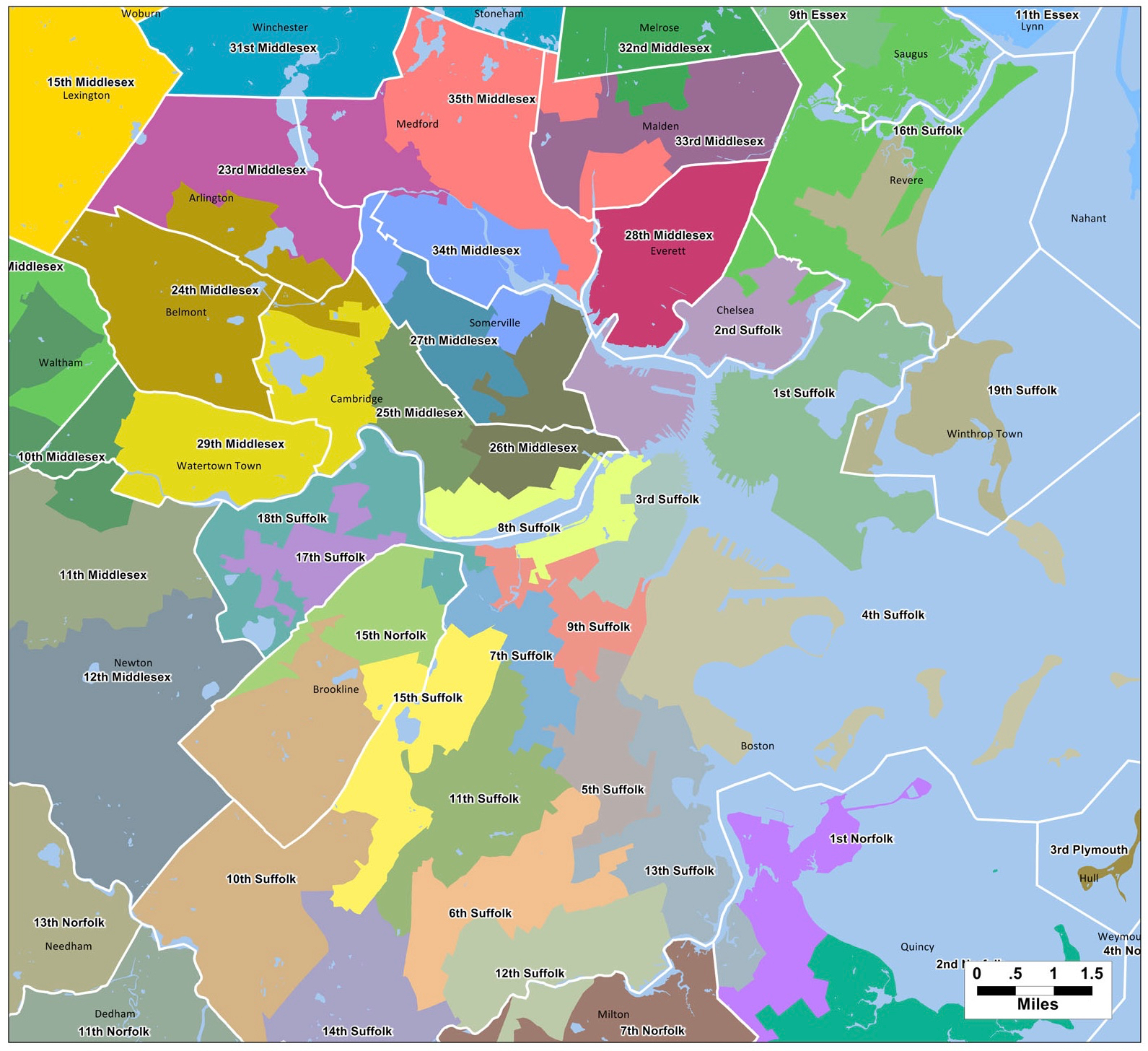
Map of Massachusetts House of Representatives districts for Suffolk and Middlesex counties, apportioned in 2011

Massachusetts House of Representatives' 8th Suffolk district in the United States is one of 160 legislative districts included in the lower house of the Massachusetts General Court. It covers parts of Boston in Suffolk County. Democrat Jay Livingstone of Back Bay has represented the district since 2013.

The current district geographic boundary overlaps with those of the Massachusetts Senate's Middlesex and Suffolk district and 3rd Suffolk district.

== Representatives ==
- Otis Rich, circa 1858
- George F. Williams, circa 1858
- Thomas H. Bussell, circa 1859
- George A. Shaw, circa 1859
- Harrison H. Atwood, circa 1888
- Edward J. Donovan, circa 1888
- James Melville Hunnewell, circa 1920
- Henry Lee Shattuck, circa 1920
- Charles Iannello, circa 1951
- Michael F. Flaherty Sr., circa 1975
- Barney Frank, circa 1979-1981
- Thomas Vallely, circa 1981-1985
- Mark Roosevelt, circa 1985-1995
- Paul C. Demakis, 1995-2005
- Martha M. Walz, January 2005 – February 2013
- Jay Livingstone, 2013-current

== See also ==
- List of Massachusetts House of Representatives elections
- Other Suffolk County districts of the Massachusetts House of Representatives: 1st, 2nd, 3rd, 4th, 5th, 6th, 7th, 9th, 10th, 11th, 12th, 13th, 14th, 15th, 16th, 17th, 18th, 19th
- List of Massachusetts General Courts
- List of former districts of the Massachusetts House of Representatives

== Images ==
Portraits of legislators

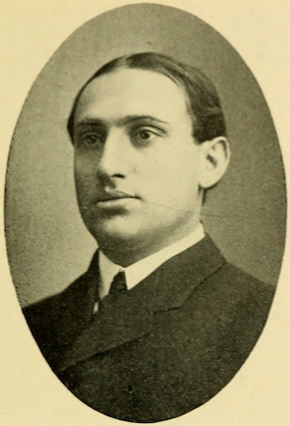
David Mancovitz

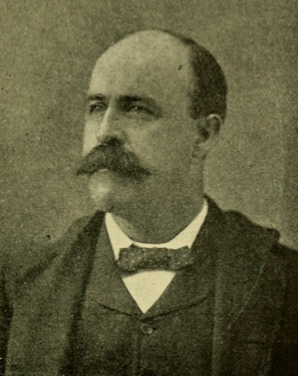
Martin Lomasney

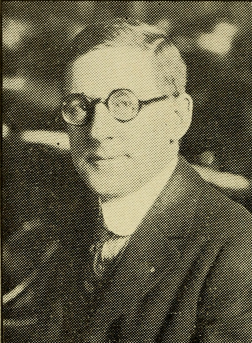
Arthur Burr

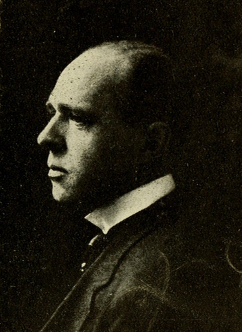
Fitz Henry Smith

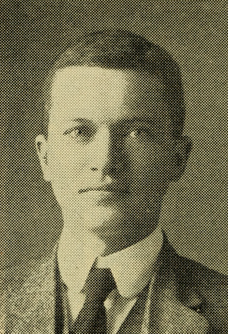
Henry Shattuck

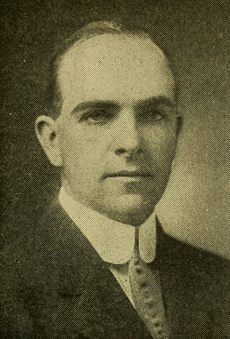
James Melville Hunnewell

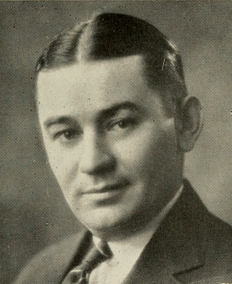
Anthony McNulty

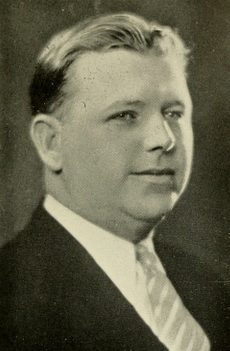
John Aspell

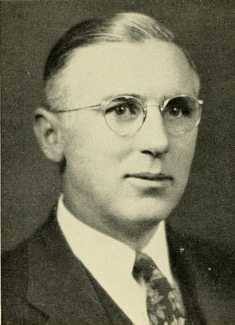
Ernest Dullea

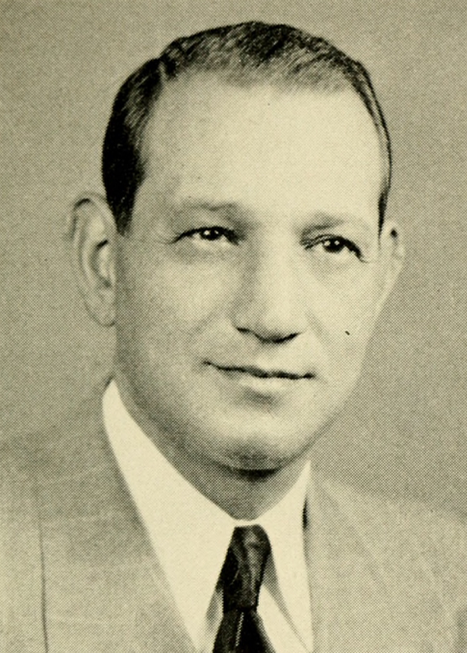
Charles Iannello

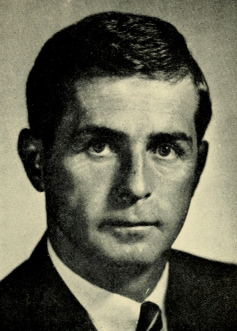
Arthur Lewis

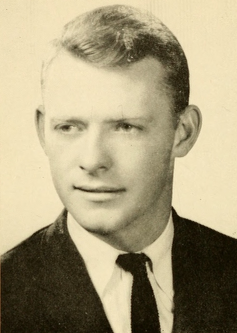
David Tobin

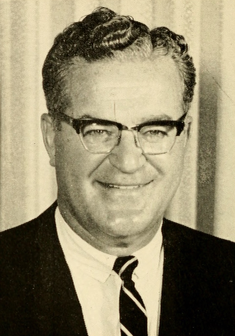
James Craven

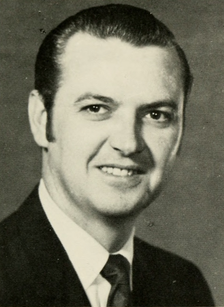
Michael Flaherty

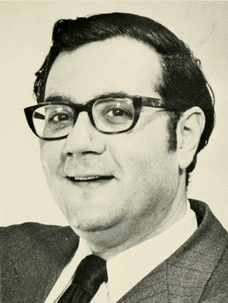
Barney Frank

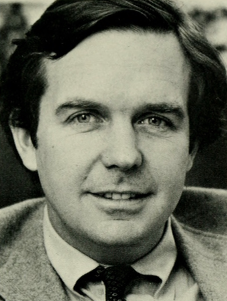
Thomas Vallely

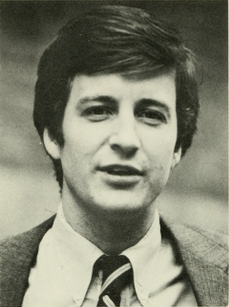
Mark Roosevelt

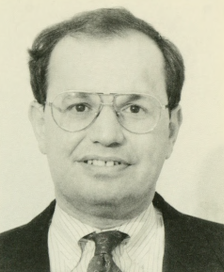
Paul Demakis

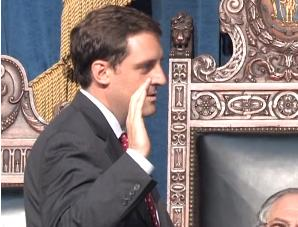
Jay Livingstone

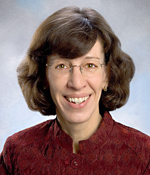
Martha Walz
