= Massachusetts House of Representatives' 3rd Suffolk district =

American legislative district

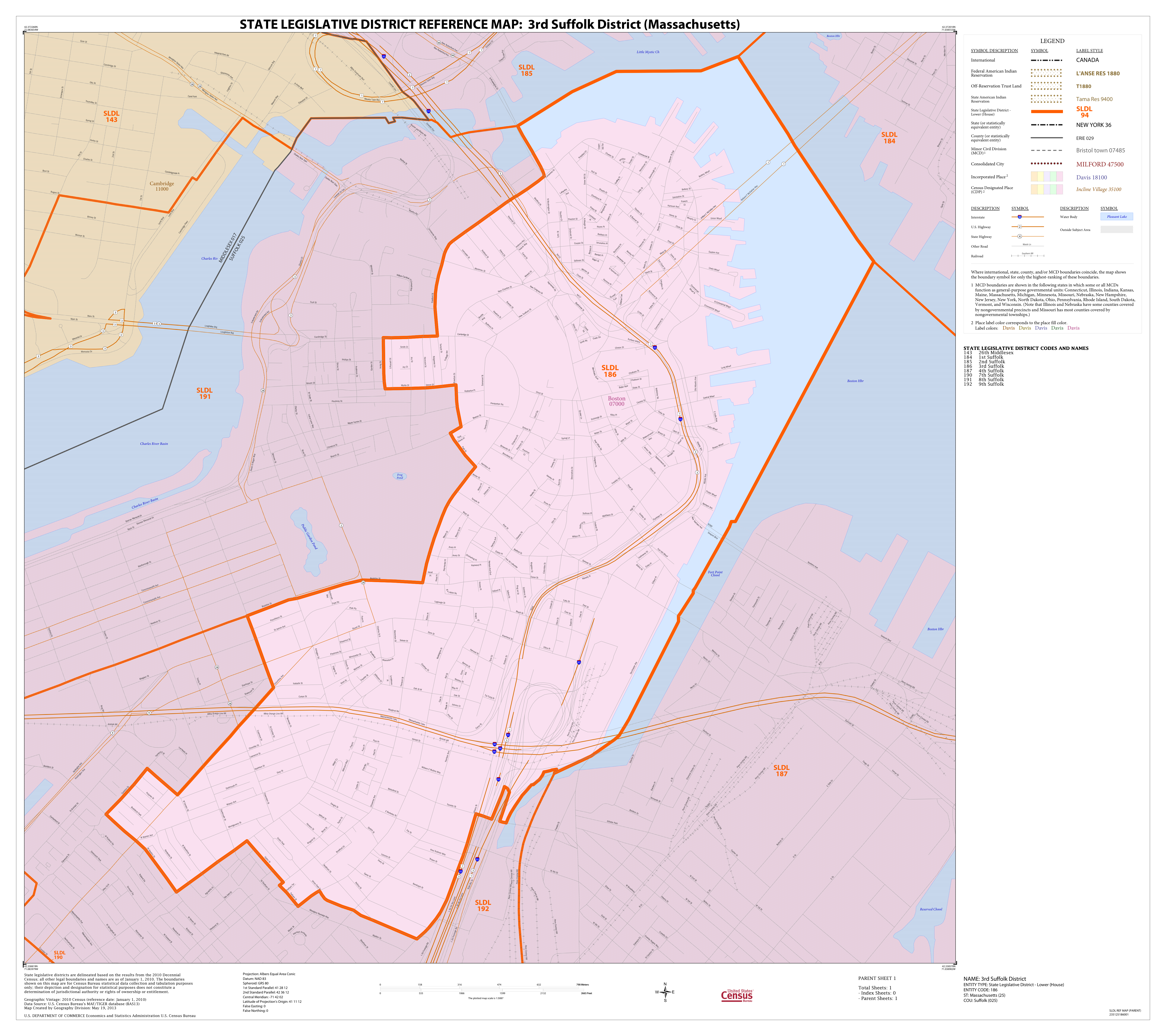
Map of Massachusetts House of Representatives' 3rd Suffolk district, based on the 2010 United States census.

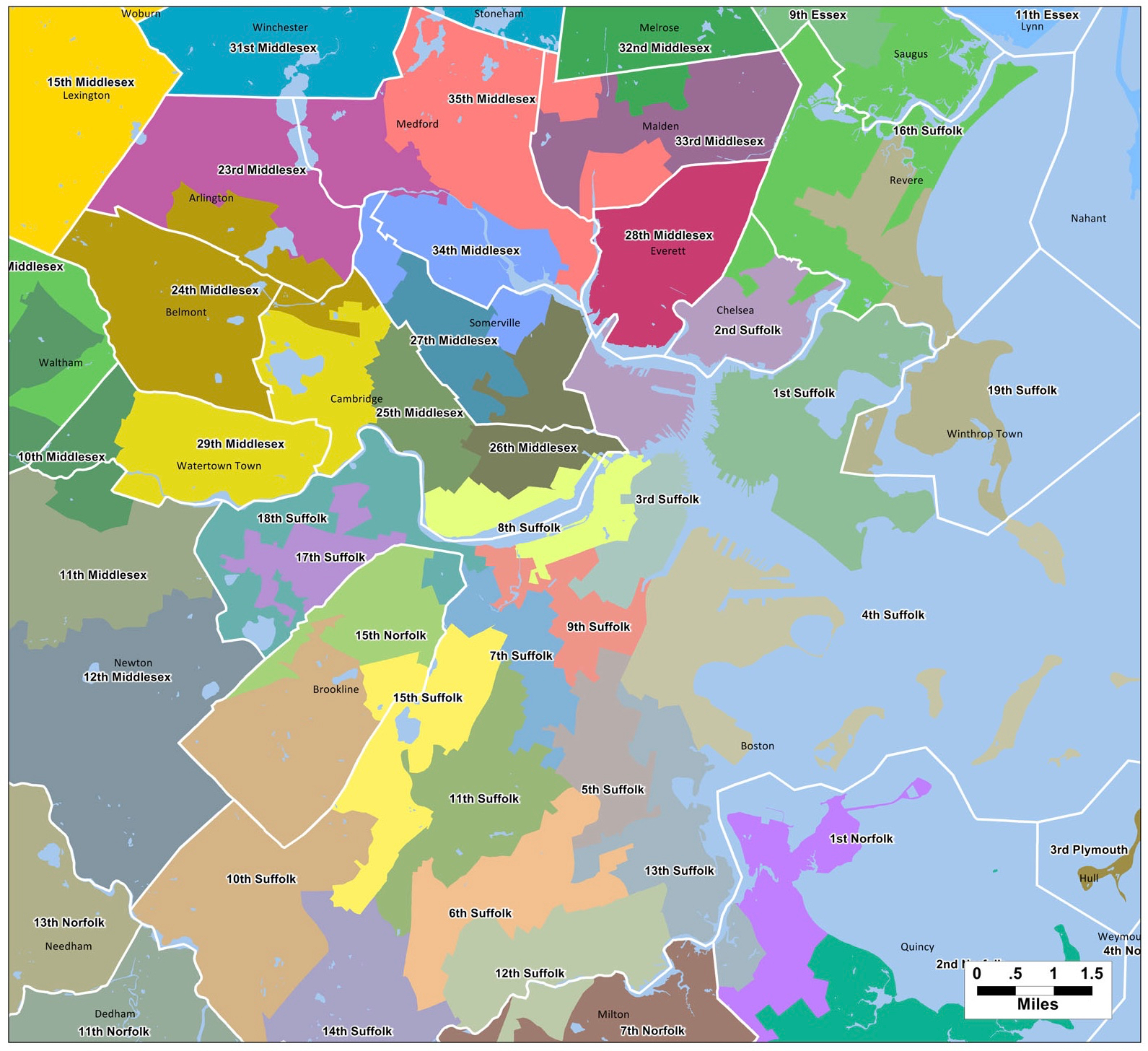
Map of Massachusetts House of Representatives districts for Suffolk County, apportioned in 2011

Massachusetts House of Representatives' 3rd Suffolk district in the United States is one of 160 legislative districts included in the lower house of the Massachusetts General Court. It covers part of the city of Boston in Suffolk County. Democrat Aaron Michlewitz of the North End has represented the district since 2009.

The current district geographic boundary overlaps with those of the Massachusetts Senate's 1st Suffolk and Middlesex district and 2nd Suffolk district.

== Representatives ==
- Peter Higgins, circa 1858
- Asa D. Pattee, circa 1858–1859
- John C. Tucker, circa 1859
- John E. Hayes, circa 1888
- John W. O'Neil, circa 1888
- Thomas H. Green, circa 1920
- John Francis Harvey, circa 1920
- Christopher A. Iannella, circa 1951
- Gabriel Francis Piemonte, circa 1951
- Katherine Kane, 1965–1968
- O. Roland Orlandi, circa 1975
- Salvatore DiMasi
- Aaron M. Michlewitz, 2009-current

== See also ==
- List of Massachusetts House of Representatives elections
- Other Suffolk County districts of the Massachusetts House of Representatives: 1st, 2nd, 4th, 5th, 6th, 7th, 8th, 9th, 10th, 11th, 12th, 13th, 14th, 15th, 16th, 17th, 18th, 19th
- List of Massachusetts General Courts
- List of former districts of the Massachusetts House of Representatives

== Images ==
Portraits of legislators

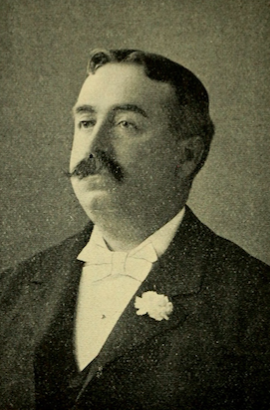
Jeremiah McCarthy

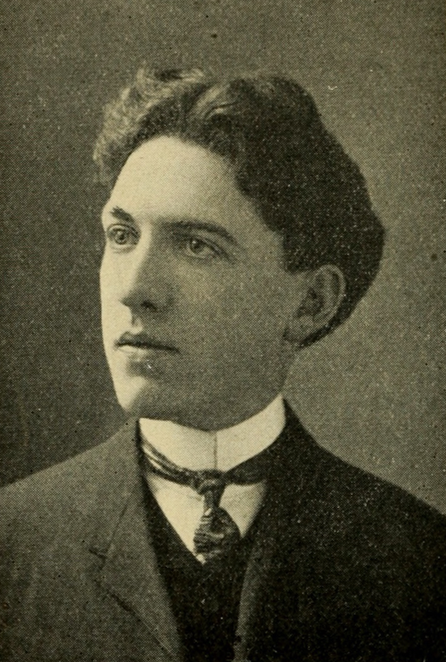
Joseph Donovan

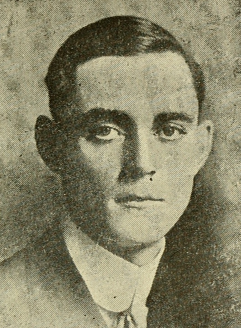
Michael McNamee

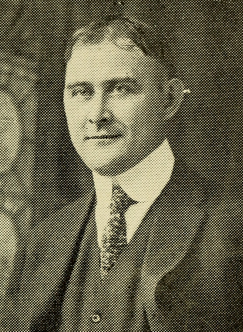
Thomas Green

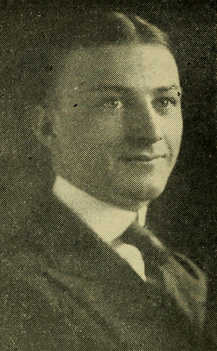
John Shepard

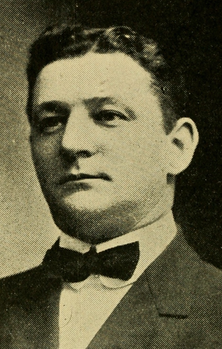
William Henry Winnett

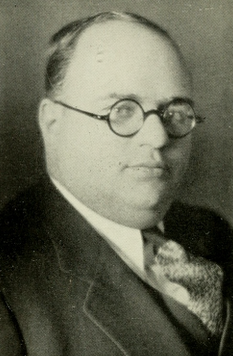
Edward Bacigalupo

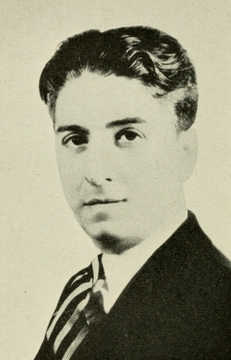
Frank Leonardi

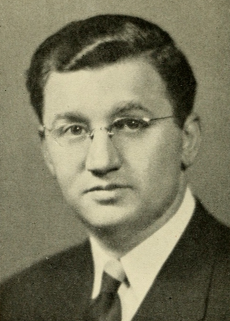
Edmund Capodilupo

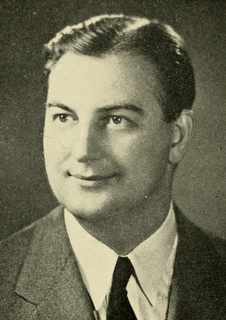
George Lanigan

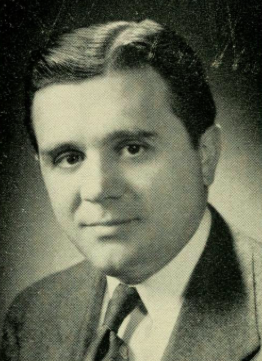
Christopher Iannella

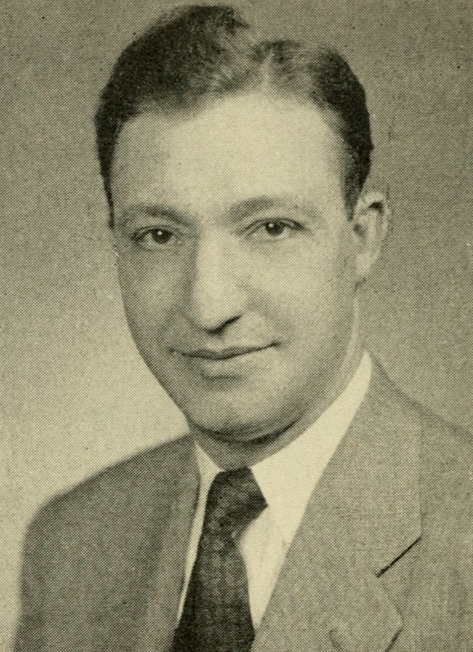
Charles Capraro

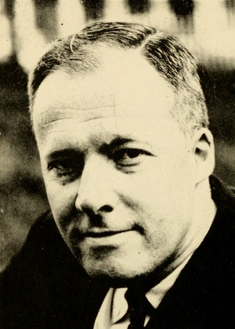
John Sears

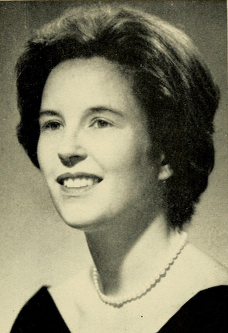
Katherine Kane

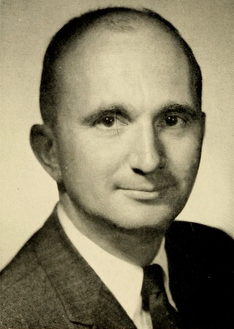
Maurice Frye

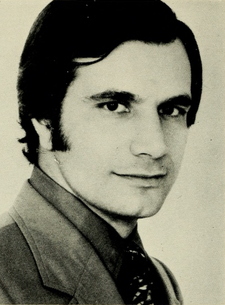
O. Roland Orlandi

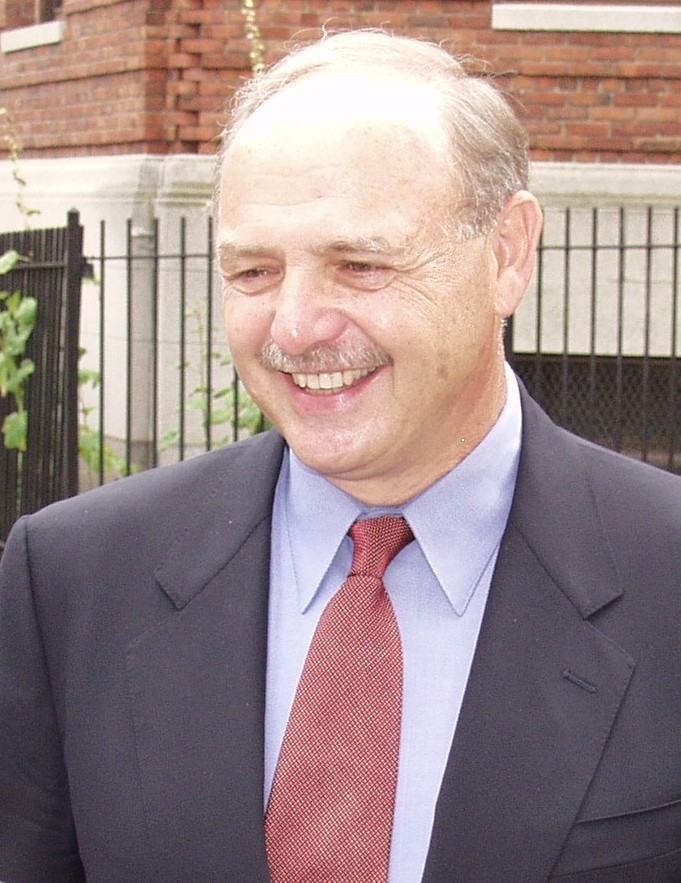
Salvatore DiMasi
