= Paul C. Demakis =

American politician

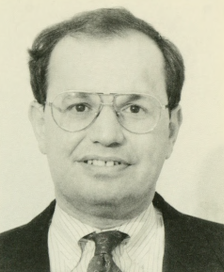
- Official portrait, circa 1995

Member of the Massachusetts House of Representatives from the 8th Suffolk district
- In office 1994–2004
- Succeeded by: Martha M. Walz

Personal details
- Party: Democratic
- Education: Harvard College (BA); Harvard Law School (JD)

Paul C. Demakis is an American politician who was the member of the Massachusetts House of Representatives from the 8th Suffolk district.
