= RoseLee Vincent =

American politician

Member of the Massachusetts House of Representatives from the 16th Suffolk District
- In office April 16, 2014 – January 6, 2021
- Preceded by: Kathi-Anne Reinstein
- Succeeded by: Jessica Giannino

Personal details
- Party: Democratic

RoseLee Vincent is an American politician elected to the Massachusetts House of Representatives. She is a Democrat from Revere, Massachusetts who was sworn in April 16, 2014 to represent the 16th Suffolk district. She won the March 4 primary and the April 1 special election called after the resignation of Kathi-Anne Reinstein.

== See also ==
- 2019–2020 Massachusetts legislature
