= Massachusetts House of Representatives' 13th Suffolk district =

American legislative district

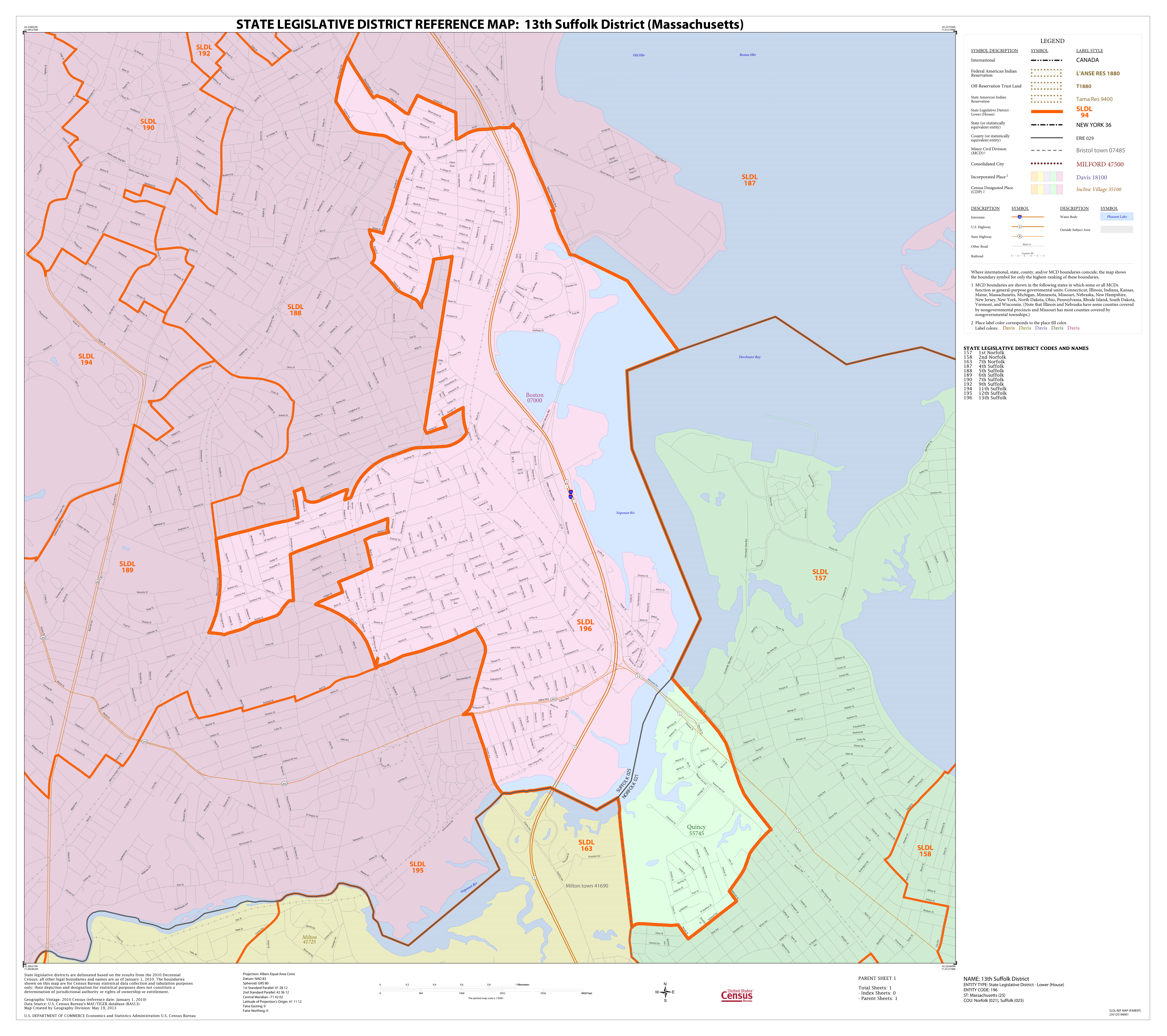
Map of Massachusetts House of Representatives' 13th Suffolk district, based on the 2010 United States census.

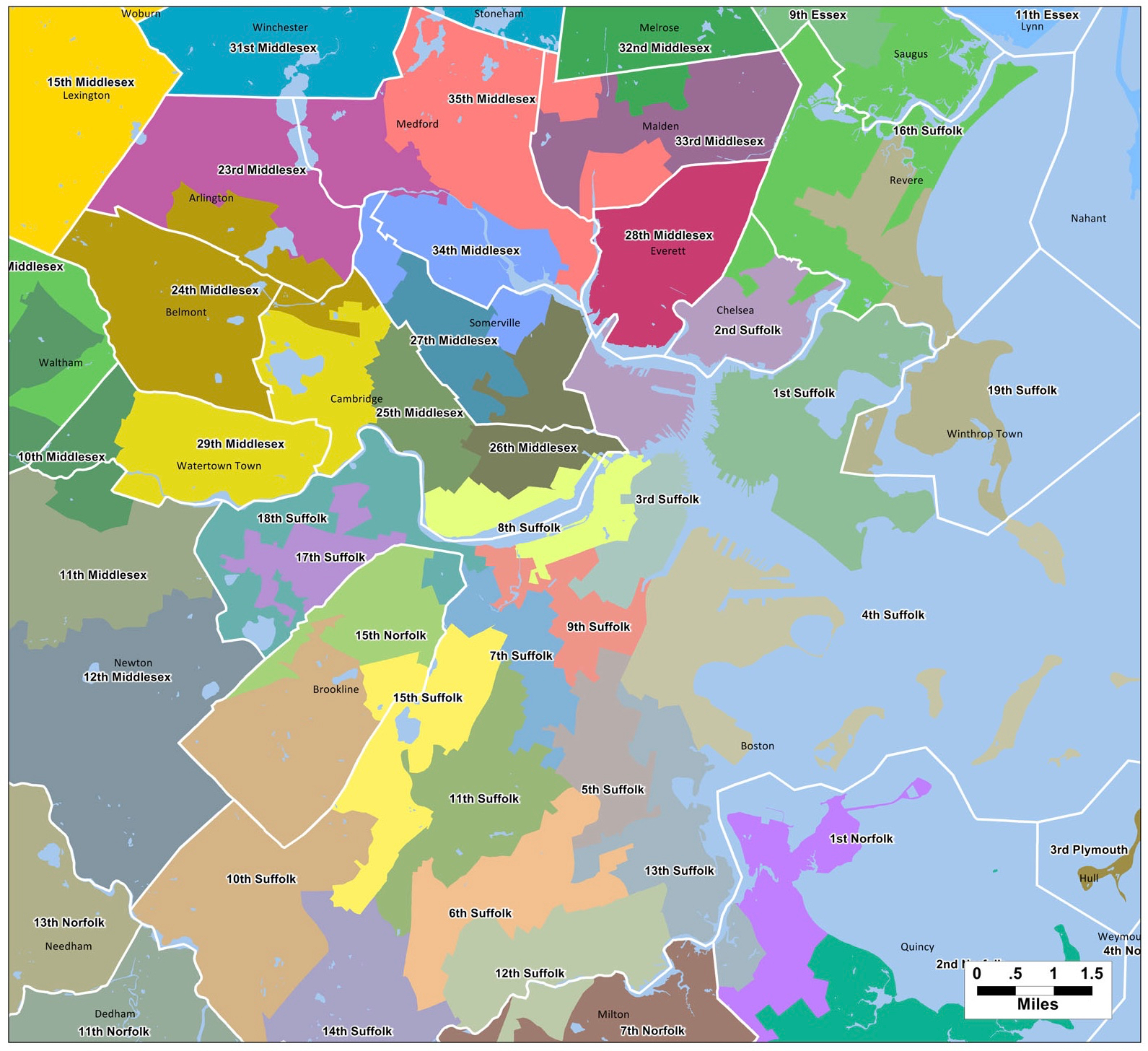
Map of Massachusetts House of Representatives districts for Suffolk County, apportioned in 2011

Massachusetts House of Representatives' 13th Suffolk district in the United States is one of 160 legislative districts included in the lower house of the Massachusetts General Court. It covers part of Quincy in Norfolk County and part of Boston in Suffolk County. Democrat Dan Hunt of Dorchester has represented the district since 2014.

The current district geographic boundary overlaps with those of the Massachusetts Senate's Norfolk and Plymouth district and 1st Suffolk district.

== Representatives ==
- John Bent, circa 1858-1859
- Mellen Chamberlain, circa 1858-1859
- Edward J. Leary, circa 1888
- Thomas F. Sullivan, circa 1888
- Frank J. Burke, circa 1920
- Richard D. Gleason, 1923–1925
- Timothy J. Driscoll, circa 1920
- Abraham Herbert Kahalas, circa 1951
- Charles Kaplan, circa 1951
- Wilfred S. Mirsky, circa 1951
- Daniel W. Carney, 1963-1971
- James J. Craven, Jr., circa 1975
- Thomas Finneran, 1989–1995
- James T. Brett, 1995–1996
- Marty Walsh, April 12, 1997 – January 3, 2014
- Daniel J. Hunt, 2014-current

== Previous locales ==
The district formerly covered:

- Chelsea, circa 1872
- North Chelsea, circa 1872
- Winthrop, circa 1872

== See also ==
- List of Massachusetts House of Representatives elections
- Other Suffolk County districts of the Massachusetts House of Representatives: 1st, 2nd, 3rd, 4th, 5th, 6th, 7th, 8th, 9th, 10th, 11th, 12th, 14th, 15th, 16th, 17th, 18th, 19th
- List of Massachusetts General Courts
- List of former districts of the Massachusetts House of Representatives

== Images ==
Portraits of legislators

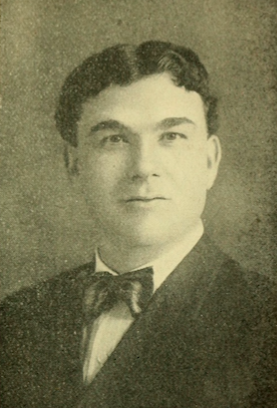
James Powers

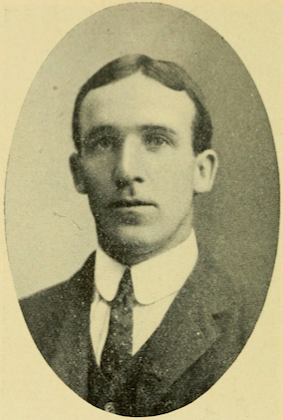
Thomas McDavitt

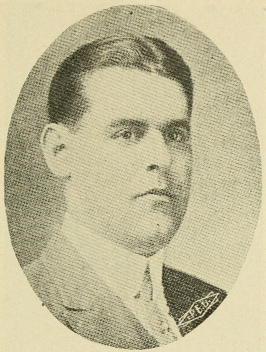
Frank James Burke

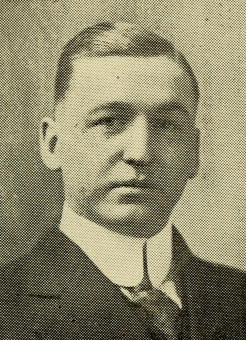
Timothy Driscoll

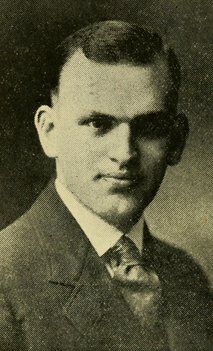
Edward Wallace

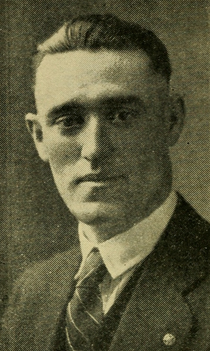
Richard Daniel Gleason

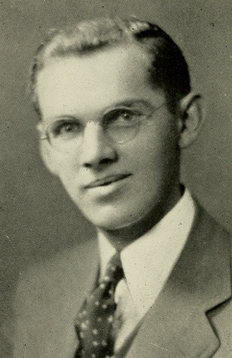
George Killgoar

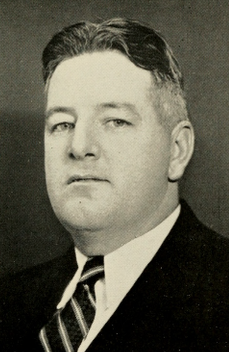
Thomas J. Hannon

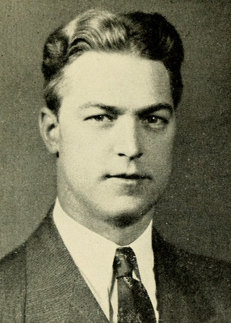
Edward Hutchinson

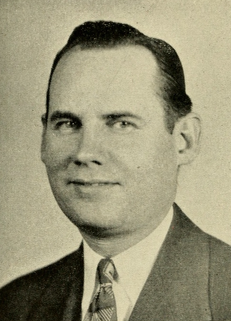
Gerald Scally

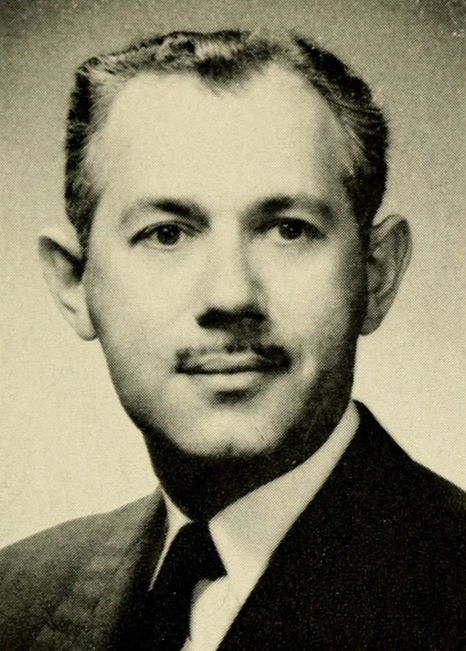
Abraham Herbert Kahalas

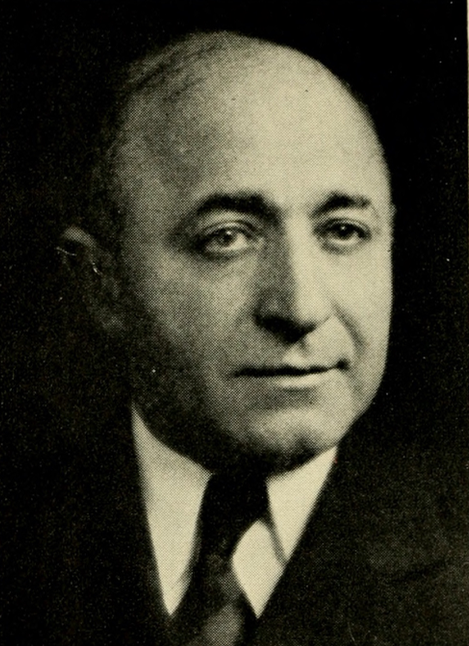
Charles Kaplan

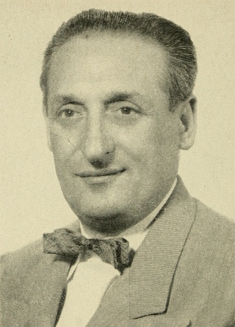
Julius Ansel

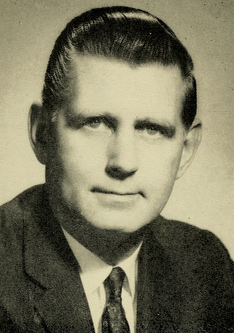
Gerald Morrissey

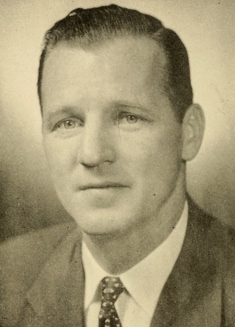
Joseph Walsh

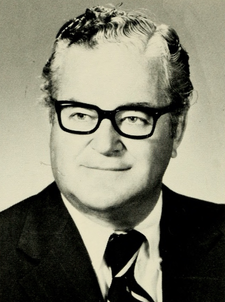
James Craven

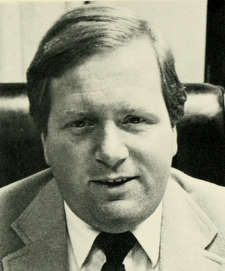
W. Paul White

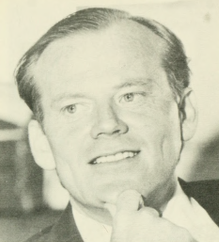
James Brett

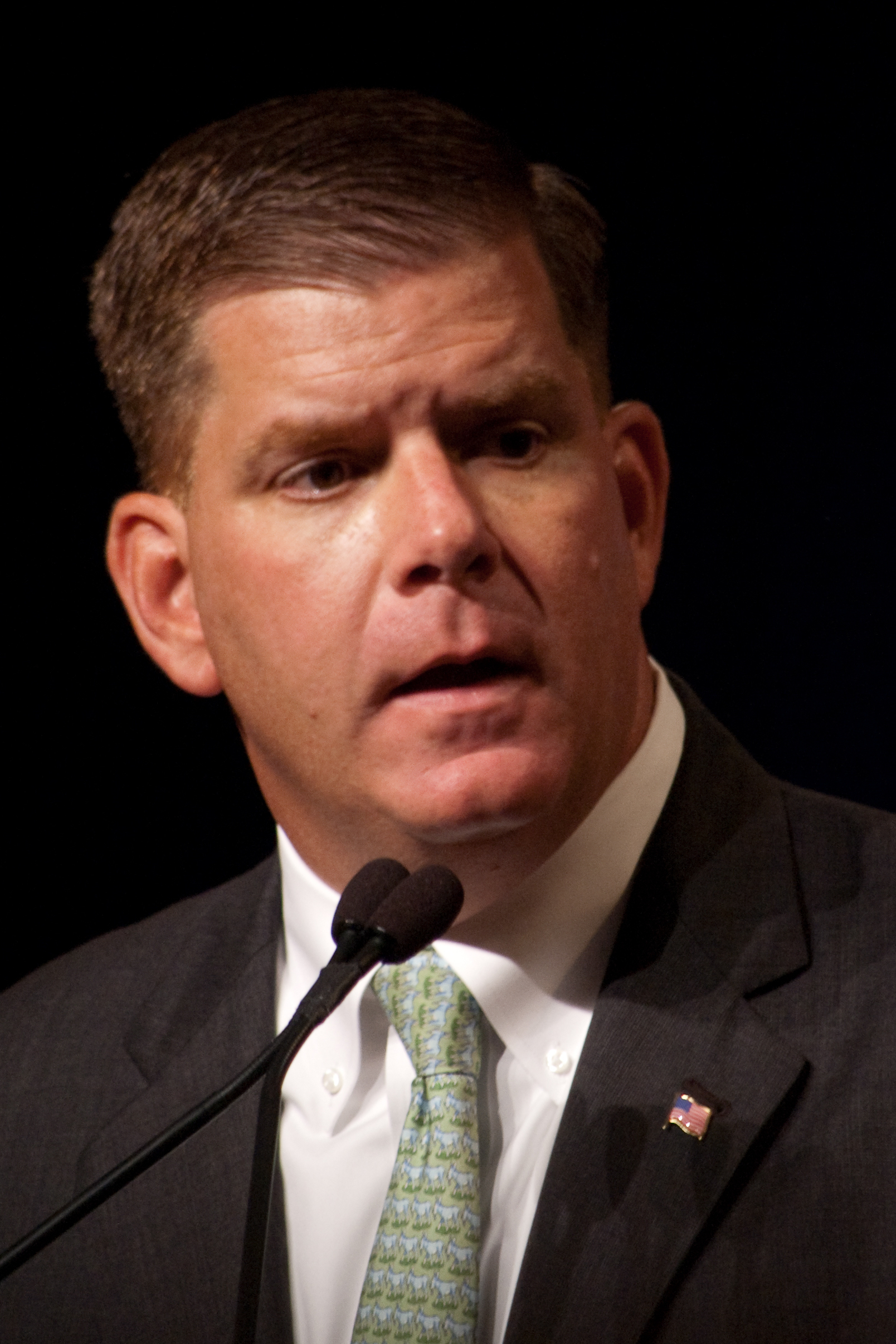
Marty Walsh
