= Massachusetts House of Representatives' 14th Suffolk district =

American legislative district

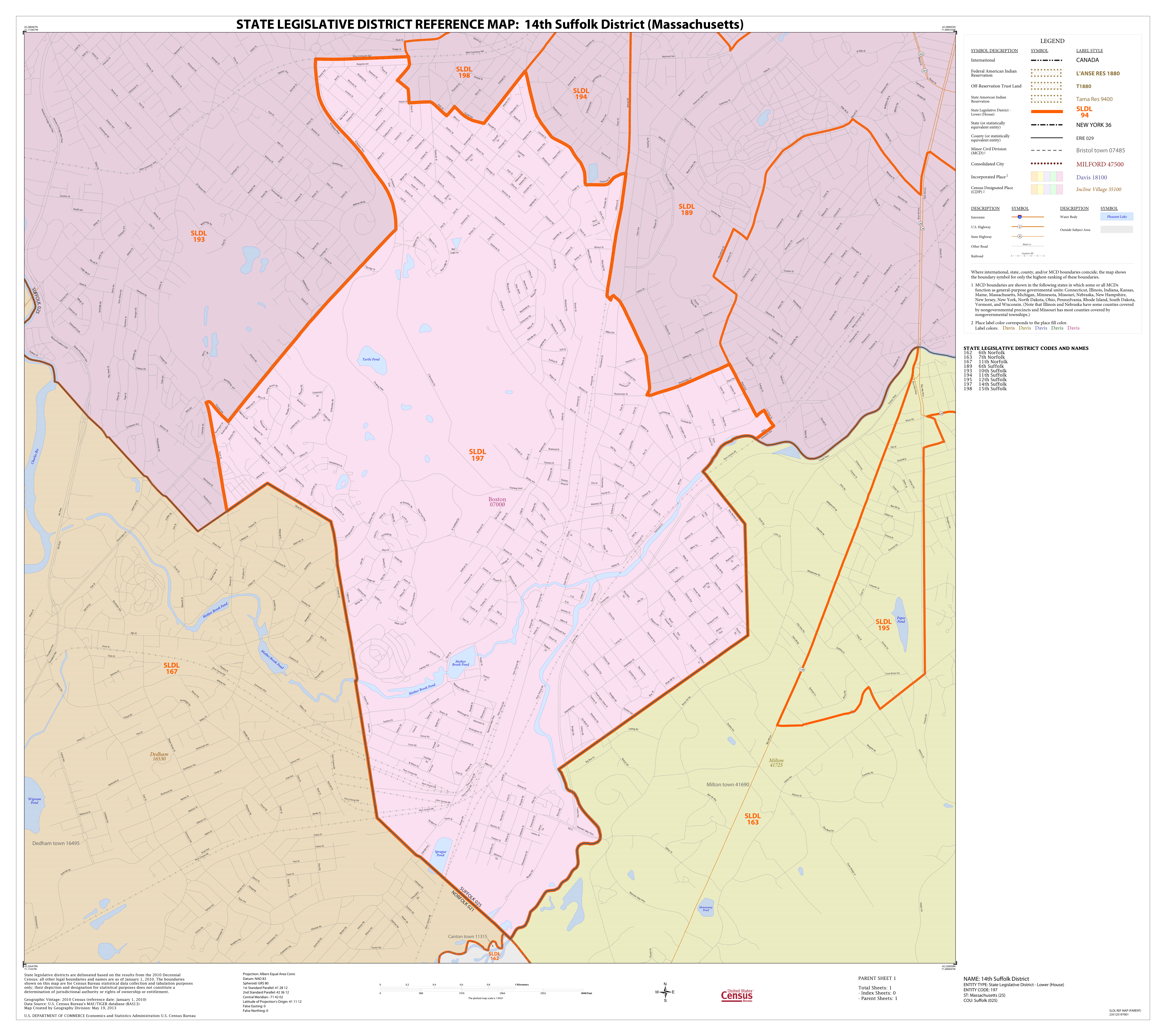
Map of Massachusetts House of Representatives' 14th Suffolk district, based on the 2010 United States census.

Massachusetts House of Representatives' 14th Suffolk district in the United States is one of 160 legislative districts included in the lower house of the Massachusetts General Court. It covers parts of Boston in Suffolk County. Democrat Angelo M. Scaccia has represented the district since 1995. Candidates for this district seat in the 2020 Massachusetts general election include Gretchen Van Ness.

The current district geographic boundary overlaps with those of the Massachusetts Senate's Norfolk and Suffolk district, 1st Suffolk district, and 2nd Suffolk district.

== Representatives ==
- E. James
- James T. Brett
- Angelo Scaccia
- Robert Consalvo

== See also ==
- List of Massachusetts House of Representatives elections
- Other Suffolk County districts of the Massachusetts House of Representatives: 1st, 2nd, 3rd, 4th, 5th, 6th, 7th, 8th, 9th, 10th, 11th, 12th, 13th, 15th, 16th, 17th, 18th, 19th
- List of Massachusetts General Courts
- List of former districts of the Massachusetts House of Representatives

== Images ==
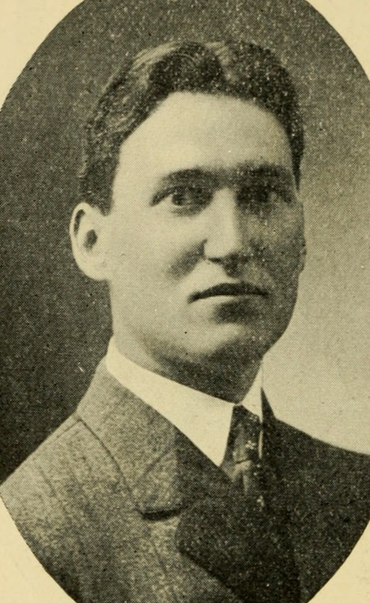
Thomas Coogan

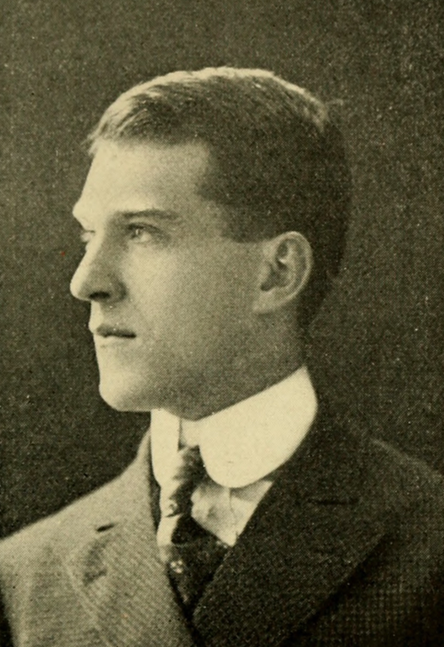
William Higgins

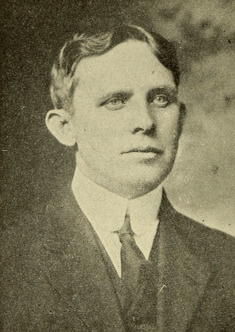
Dennis Reardon

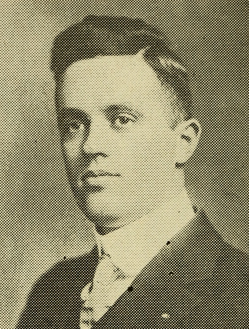
William Dwyer

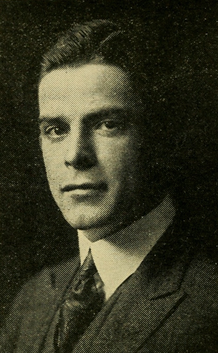
Hugh Joseph Campbell

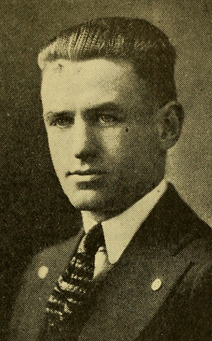
Michael Hourihan

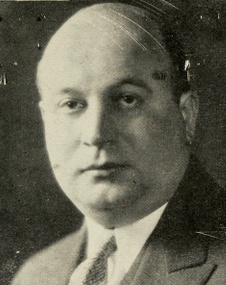
Bernard Finkelstein

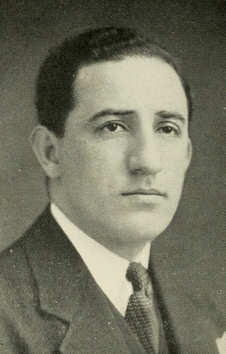
David Rose

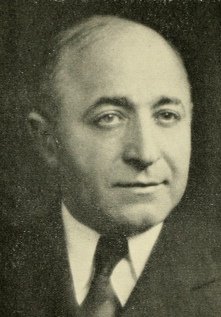
Charles Kaplan

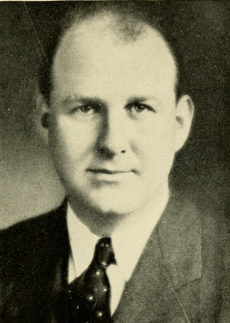
Charles Miller

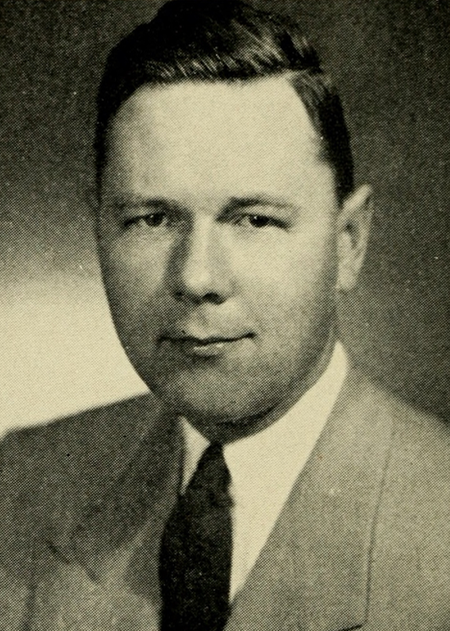
Daniel Matthew O'Sullivan

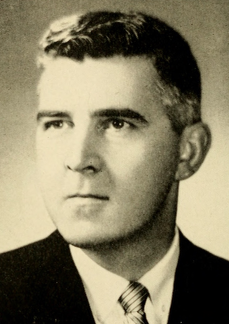
Daniel Carney

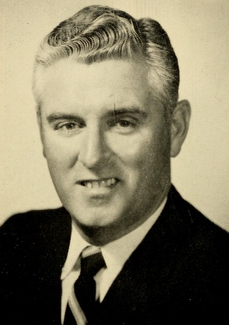
Joseph Kearney

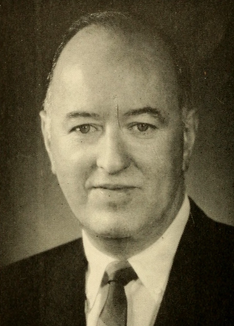
Michael Feeney

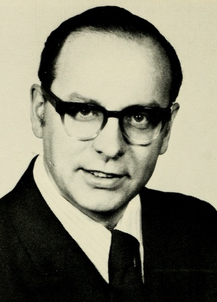
Richard Finnigan

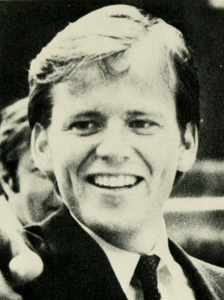
James Brett

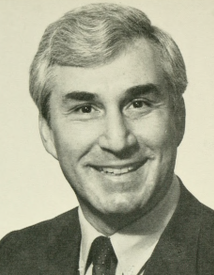
Angelo Scaccia
