= Robert Rufo =

American politician

Suffolk County Sheriff
- In office 1986–1996
- Preceded by: Dennis J. Kearney
- Succeeded by: Richard J. Rouse

Personal details
- Party: Democratic
- Education: Boston College; Suffolk University Law School; Harvard University
- Occupation: Lawyer; Politician; Judge

Robert C. Rufo is an American jurist and politician who served as General Counsel to the Suffolk County Sheriff's Department from 1977 to 1986, Sheriff of Suffolk County from 1986 to 1996, associate justice of the Suffolk County Superior Court from 1996 to 2004, and associate justice of the Barnstable County Superior Court from 2004 to 2020. He was a candidate for Mayor of Boston in 1993. He finished third with 20.14% of the vote. Rufo also served as an adjunct professor at Suffolk University Law School and New England School of Law. He is a graduate of Boston College (B.S.), Suffolk University Law School (J.D.), and Harvard University (M.P.A.).
