= Massachusetts House of Representatives' 16th Suffolk district =

American legislative district

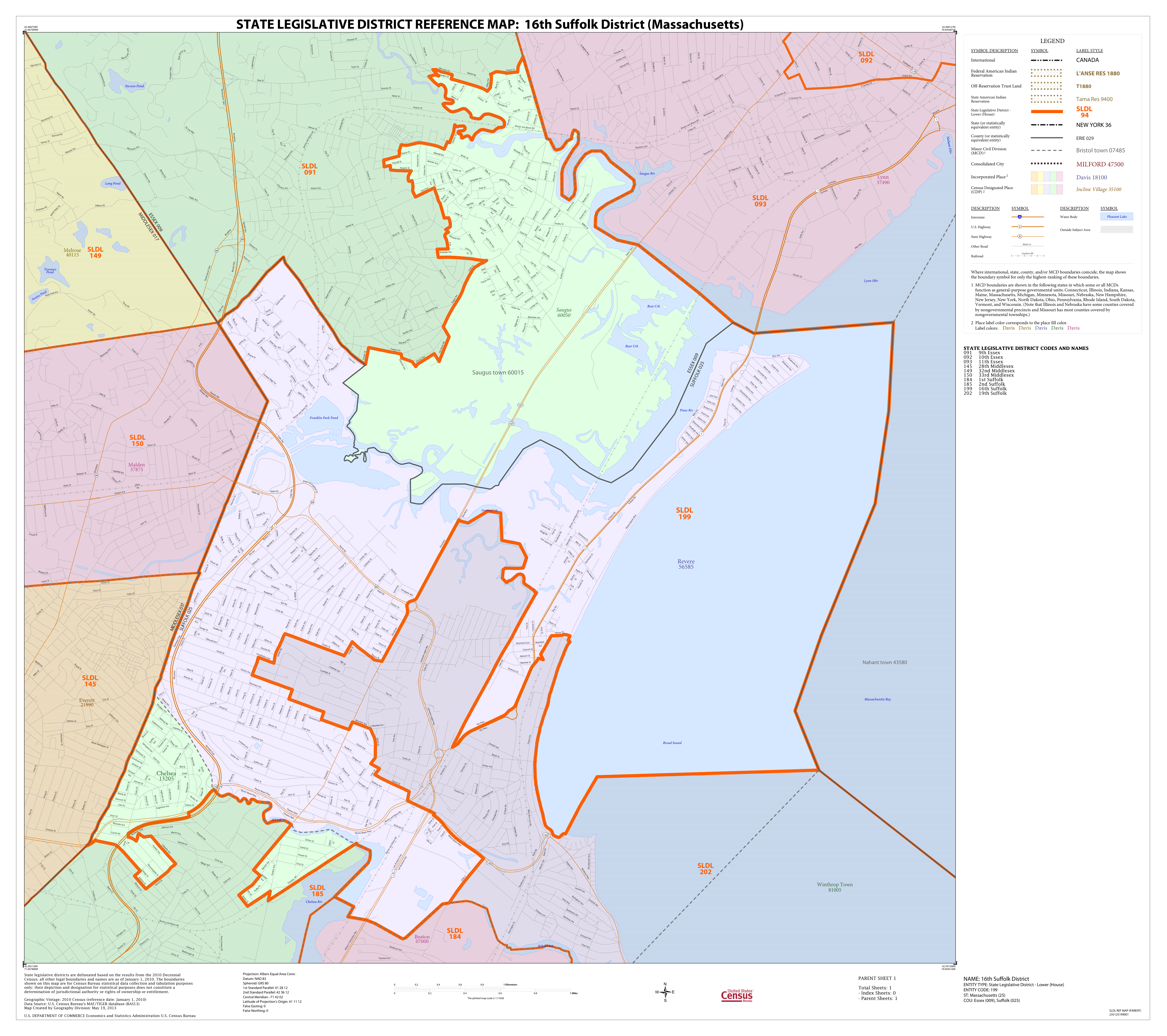
Map of Massachusetts House of Representatives' 16th Suffolk district, based on the 2010 United States census.

Massachusetts House of Representatives' 16th Suffolk district in the United States is one of 160 legislative districts included in the lower house of the Massachusetts General Court. It covers parts of Essex County and Suffolk County. Democrat RoseLee Vincent of Revere has represented the district since 2015. Candidates for this district seat in the 2020 Massachusetts general election include Joseph Gravellese and Jessica Giannino.

== Locales represented ==
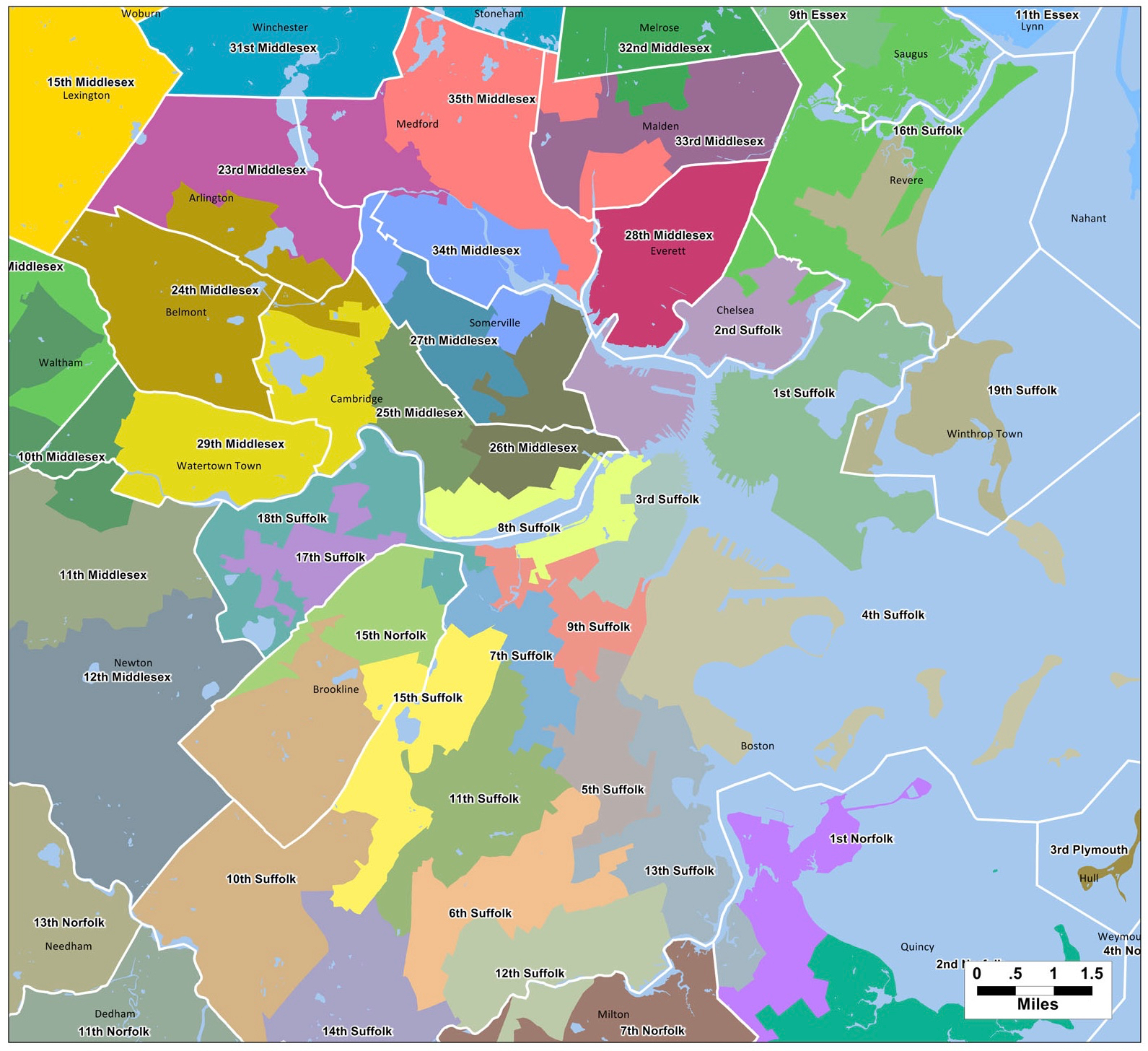
Map of Massachusetts House of Representatives districts for Suffolk County, apportioned in 2011

The district includes the following localities:

- part of Chelsea
- part of Revere
- part of Saugus

The current district geographic boundary overlaps with those of the Massachusetts Senate's 3rd Essex district, Middlesex and Suffolk district, and 1st Suffolk and Middlesex district.

== Representatives ==
- Jeremiah Desmond, circa 1888
- James Donovan, circa 1888
- Addison P. Beardsley, circa 1920
- Coleman Silbert, circa 1920
- William Francis Keenan, circa 1951
- Bernard M. Lally, circa 1951
- Robert L. Fortes, 1975–1979
- William Reinstein
- Kathi-Anne Reinstein
- Roselee Vincent, 2015-
- Jessica Giannino, 2021-current

== See also ==
- List of Massachusetts House of Representatives elections
- Other Suffolk County districts of the Massachusetts House of Representatives: 1st, 2nd, 3rd, 4th, 5th, 6th, 7th, 8th, 9th, 10th, 11th, 12th, 13th, 14th, 15th, 17th, 18th, 19th
- List of Massachusetts General Courts
- List of former districts of the Massachusetts House of Representatives

== Images ==
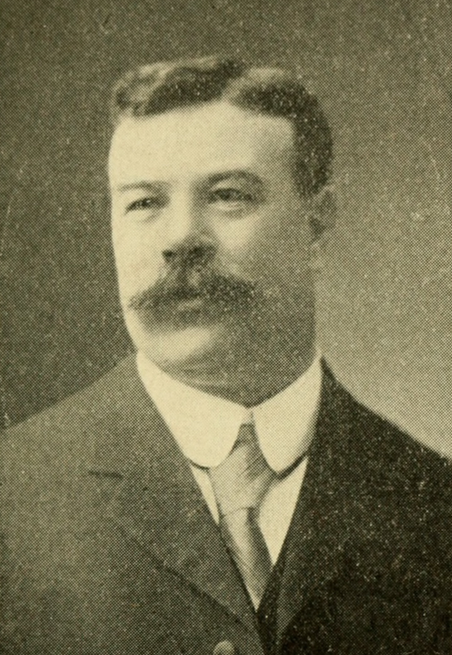
Herbert Frost

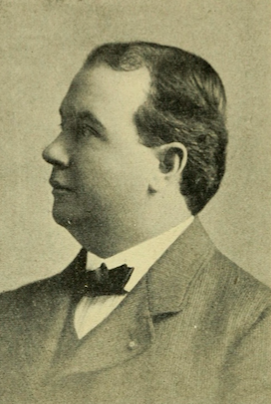
William O'Brien

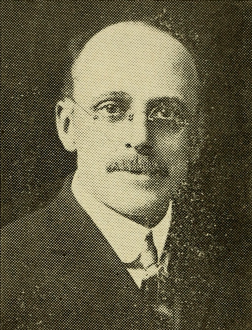
John Ballantyne

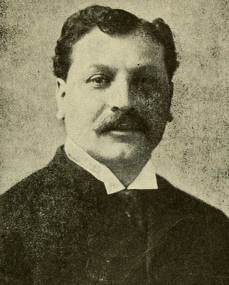
Simon Swig

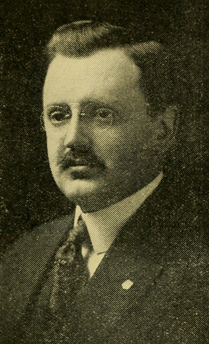
Carroll Meins

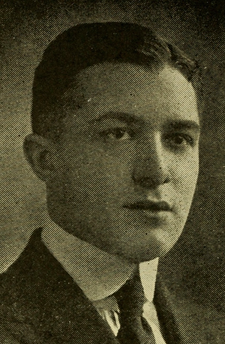
Elijah Adlow

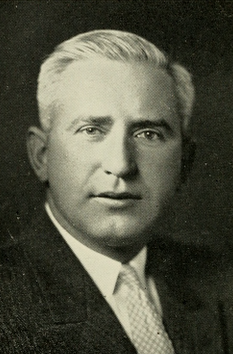
Bernard Casey

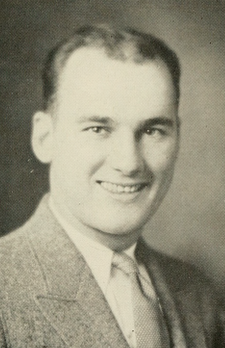
Joseph Murphy

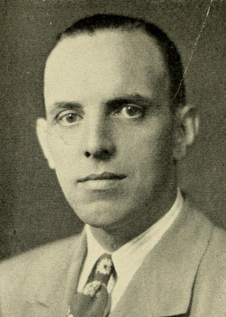
Edward Mulligan

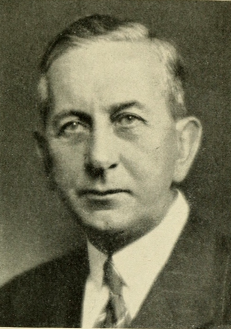
Philip McMorrow

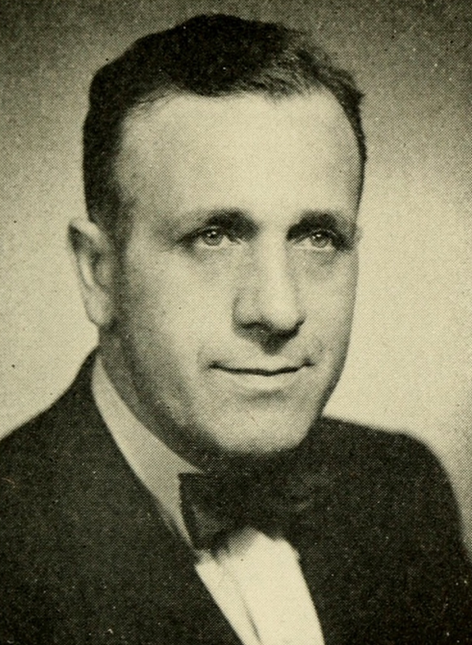
Anthony Farin

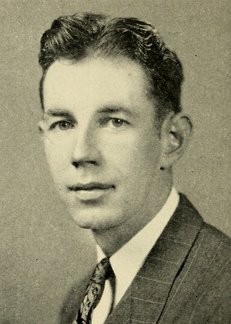
William Francis Keenan

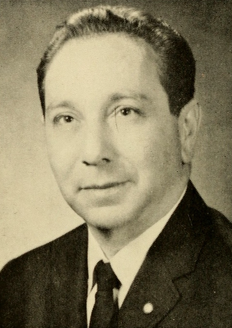
Arnold Epstein

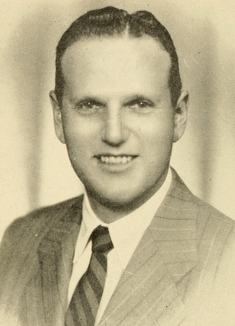
Norman Weinberg

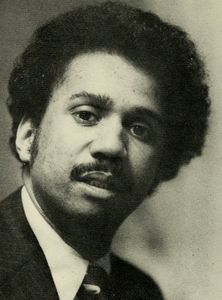
Robert Fortes

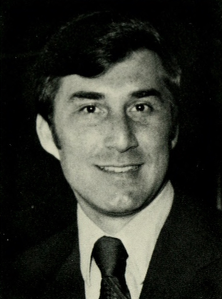
Angelo Scaccia

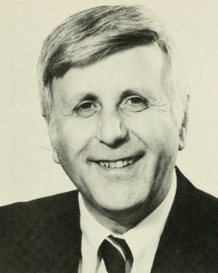
William Reinstein

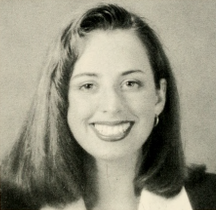
Kathi-Anne Reinstein
