= Angelo Scaccia =

American politician

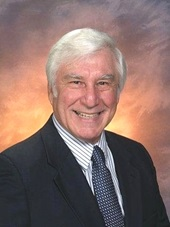

Member of the Massachusetts House of Representatives
- In office 1973–1979

Member of the Massachusetts House of Representatives from the 14th Suffolk district
- In office 1981–2021
- Preceded by: Michael Paul Feeney
- Succeeded by: Robert Consalvo

Personal details
- Born: September 29, 1942 (age 83)

Angelo M. Scaccia (born September 29, 1942) is an American state legislator who formerly served in the Massachusetts House of Representatives. He is a Readville resident and a member of the Democratic Party.

Scaccia served in the United States Marine Corps during the Vietnam War.

He served 23 terms in the House. He first entered the body in 1973 and served until 1978. He returned to the House in 1981. By the time he retired, he was Dean of the House, the longest serving member.

Scaccia was "a longtime friend and ally" of Boston mayor Tom Menino according to author and activist Don Gillis.

In the fall of 2001, Scaccia put forward a legislative resolution honoring Babe Ruth for his time as a player with the Boston Red Sox, suggesting that the Curse of the Bambino might be because the state never properly thanked Ruth for his time in Boston.

In the 2012 primary election, Scaccia won his party's nomination for the 14th Suffolk district with 1,984 votes against his opponent Anthony J. Solimine's 593 votes.

In the 2018 election, he won the Democratic Party nomination for the 14th Suffolk district seat when two progressive candidates split the primary vote. Scaccia received about 39.5% of primary votes, Gretchen Van Ness 26%, and Segun Idowu 21.5%. In this heavily Democratic district, winning the primary was sufficient to guarantee his reelection in practice.

== See also ==
- 2019–2020 Massachusetts legislature
