= Rosemarie Sansone =

American politician

Sansone in the mid-1980s

Rosemarie E. Sansone (1945– February 21, 2022) was an American politician who served on the Boston City Council for two terms from 1978 to 1982.

== Early life and education ==
Sansone was born in 1945, the daughter of Stephen J. Sansone and Rose M. Sansone (née Picciarelli). She had an older brother named Michael.

Sansone graduated from Lexington High School in Lexington, Massachusetts.

== Early political career ==
After graduating high school, Sansone worked for Massachusetts Lieutenant Governor Francis X. Bellotti in 1964. She worked on Boston Mayor Kevin White's campaign in the 1970 Massachusetts gubernatorial election.

In 1976, Sansone was director of the successful campaign in support of ratifying the Equal Rights Amendment in Massachusetts.

== Boston City Council ==
In 1977, Sansone was elected to the Boston City Council. She was re-elected to a second term in 1979. During her tenure, she was a leading advocate in support of the effort to create constituency-based seats on the council. She opted against seeking re-election in 1981.

After Boston voters approved the creation of constituency-based seats on the council in a 1981 referendum, Council President Patrick F. McDonough (who had opposed the change) appointed Sansone to chair the committee to draw the district boundaries. However, he also chose to appoint Frederick C. Langone, Dapper O'Neil, and John W. Sears as the committee's other three members, all three of whom had opposed the adoption of district representation. Both Langone and O'Neil would be returning to the Council in 1982, had not run for re-election in 1981 and would not be able to vote on the district boundaries if the committee did not work quickly to present a plan to the council before the end of the year. The process was long, controversial, and complicated and lasted into the subsequent council. Newly-elected councilor Terence P. McDermott took over the as the committee chair after Sansone's term ended.

== Director of the Boston Office of Business and Cultural Development ==
During the mayoralty of Raymond Flynn, Sansone served as Director of the Office of Business and Cultural Development. She played a significant role in attracting companies, tourism, and conventions to Boston.

== Later career ==
In 1994, Sansone became Director of Public Affairs at Suffolk University. In this role, she was involved in public-private partnerships revitalizing the surrounding Downtown Boston area.

In 2007, Sansone left her position at Suffolk University to work for the Downtown Crossing Partnership. She was successful in pushing for the creation of the first business improvement district in Boston to revitalize a portion of Downtown Boston that had been negatively impacted by the Great Recession. She then served as president and CEO of the Downtown Boston Business Improvement District.

== Personal life ==
Sansone was a life partner of David Lancaster.

Sansone died of cancer at the age of 77 on February 21, 2022, while at her home in Lexington, Massachusetts.
