= Doris Bunte =

American politician (1933–2021)

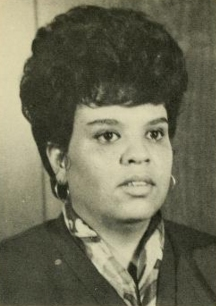
- Official portrait, 1973

Member of the Massachusetts House of Representatives from the 7th Suffolk district
- In office 1973–1984
- Preceded by: Franklin W. Holgate
- Succeeded by: Gloria Fox

Boston Housing Authority Administrator
- In office 1984–1992
- Preceded by: Harry Spence
- Succeeded by: David Cortiella

Personal details
- Born: July 2, 1933 New York City, New York, U.S.
- Died: February 15, 2021 (aged 87) Brookline, Massachusetts, U.S.
- Party: Democratic
- Education: Harvard University (MEd)

Doris Bunte (July 2, 1933 – February 15, 2021) was an American politician who was a member of the Massachusetts House of Representatives from 1973 to 1984 and administrator of the Boston Housing Authority from 1984 to 1992. She was the first African-American woman to hold either position.

== Biography ==
Bunte was born on July 2, 1933, in New York City and educated in the New York City public schools.

She was a tenant activist at the Orchard Park housing project (now Orchard Gardens) in Roxbury. She was a member of the National Rent Board, the Critical Minority Affairs Committee, the National Association of Housing and Redevelopment Officials, the National Tenants Organization, and the Citizens Housing and Planning Association.

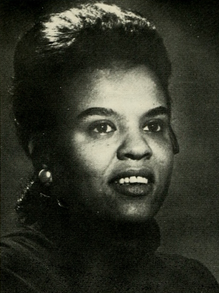
Official portrait, 1975

In 1972, Bunte was elected to the Massachusetts House of Representatives (7th Suffolk District, Wards 8, 9 and 12), where she served for 12 years. She was the first African-American woman elected to the Massachusetts state legislature. In 1984, Mayor Raymond Flynn appointed her Administrator of the Boston Housing Authority, where she served until 1992. She was also the first BHA official who had lived in public housing. She was the first African-American woman to hold that position in Boston, and the first former public housing tenant to lead a public housing agency in a major city. During her career in Massachusetts politics she was known as a strong advocate for public housing. Bunte was among the three founding members of the Massachusetts Legislative Black Caucus.

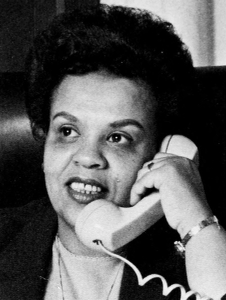
Official portrait, c. 1983

Afterwards she worked at the Boston University School of Public Health and the Center for Sport in Society at Northeastern University before retiring in 2010.

She died on February 15, 2021, from cancer in her home in Brookline, Massachusetts.

== Honors ==
In 2018, the Walnut Park Apartments were renamed the Doris Bunte Apartments.

== See also ==
- Massachusetts House of Representatives' 9th Suffolk district
- 168th Massachusetts General Court (1973–1974)
- 169th Massachusetts General Court (1975–1976)
- 170th Massachusetts General Court (1977–1978)
- 171st Massachusetts General Court (1979–1980)
- 172nd Massachusetts General Court (1981–1982)
- 173rd Massachusetts General Court (1983–1984)
