= Senator Bolling =

Senator Bolling may refer to:

- Bill Bolling (born 1957), Virginia State Senate
- Royal L. Bolling (1920–2002), Massachusetts State Senate
