= Sam Montaño =

Massachusetts community organizer and politician

Member of the Massachusetts House of Representatives from the 15th Suffolk district
- Incumbent
- Assumed office January 4, 2023
- Preceded by: Nika Elugardo

Personal details
- Born: Samantha Montaño; December 10, 1989 (age 36)
- Party: Democratic
- Education: University of California, Los Angeles (BA)

Samantha Montaño (born 1989/1990) is an American community organizer and politician who has served as a member of the Massachusetts House of Representatives from the 15th Suffolk district since 2023. They are a member of the Democratic Party.

== Biography ==
Montaño is from Los Angeles, California, and received a bachelor's degree in anthropology from the University of California, Los Angeles. They are a member of the LGBTQ+ community, using she/they pronouns, and identify as Latinx and Chicanx.

In 2022, Montaño ran for election to the Massachusetts House of Representatives in the 15th Suffolk district. They won the Democratic Party primary with 57.5% of the vote, and the general election with 98.8% of the vote. Montaño represents regions of the Boston neighborhoods of Roxbury, Mission Hill, and Jamaica Plain.

== Community organizing ==
Prior to running for the Massachusetts House of Representatives in 2022, Montaño was involved in community organizing and advocacy in Jamaica Plain and describes "deep roots" in the neighborhood. After moving to Jamaica Plain in 2015, Montaño ran for the Jamaica Plain Neighborhood Council and won a seat representing Area B, the Easternmost region of the neighborhood. They eventually served as chair of the Council.

Significant work in Jamaica Plain prior to election also includes working as a resident organizer at the Mildred C. Hailey housing project to establish a youth center. Montaño also served in the Impact Advisory Group at the Pine Street Inn.

Other work in the Boston area prior to their candidacy included working as Director of Organizing at GreenRoots, Inc, an environmental justice organization in Chelsea, Massachusetts. They also served as a housing advocate with the Jamaica Plain Neighborhood Development Corporation, a program officer with the Massachusetts Cultural Council, and a guest advocate with the Crittenton Women's Union.

In 2024, Montaño became the executive director of the Transgender Emergency Fund of Massachusetts, an organization that provides life-sustaining resources, including drop-in services and transitional housing support, to transgender people.

== Campaign for House of Representatives ==
In November 2021, Massachusetts Governor Charlie Baker signed into law a redistricting bill that would take effect in the 2022 election. While Jamaica Plain belonged to the 10th and 15th Suffolk districts from 2011-2021, the redistricting incorporated the entire neighborhood into the 15th Suffolk district.

Montaño ran for election to the Massachusetts House of Representatives in the 15th Suffolk district. They won the Democratic Party primary with 57.5% of the vote, defeating Roxanne Longoria, Richard Anthony Fierro, and May Ann Nelson. They won the general election as the sole candidate with 98.8% of the vote.

Montaño identified affordable housing, tenant protections, racial justice, and environmental justice as priorities during their 2022 campaign.

== Personal life ==
Sam Montaño grew up in Los Angeles, California. They are a member of the LGBTQ+ community, using she/they pronouns, and identify as Latinx and Chicanx.

Montaño was inspired by their personal history to work in housing justice, sharing in an op-ed that as a child, their family experienced housing instability due to their father's substance use disorder. They have stated that this experience directly influences their support for expanding substance use treatment services across Boston, including the proposed Shattuck Hospital redevelopment project in Jamaica Plain.
