= Massachusetts House of Representatives' 6th Suffolk district =

American legislative district

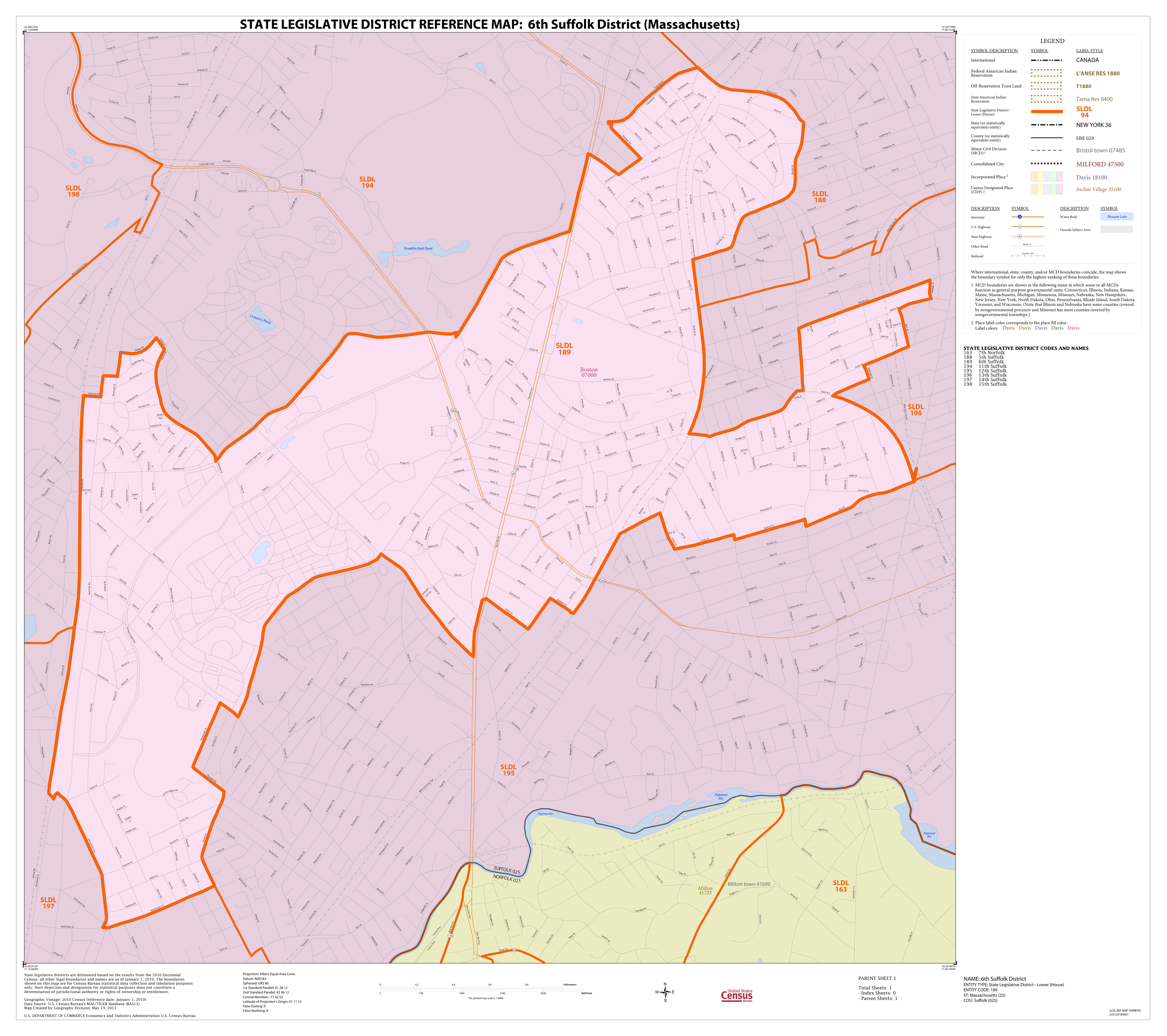
Map of Massachusetts House of Representatives' 6th Suffolk district, based on the 2010 United States census.

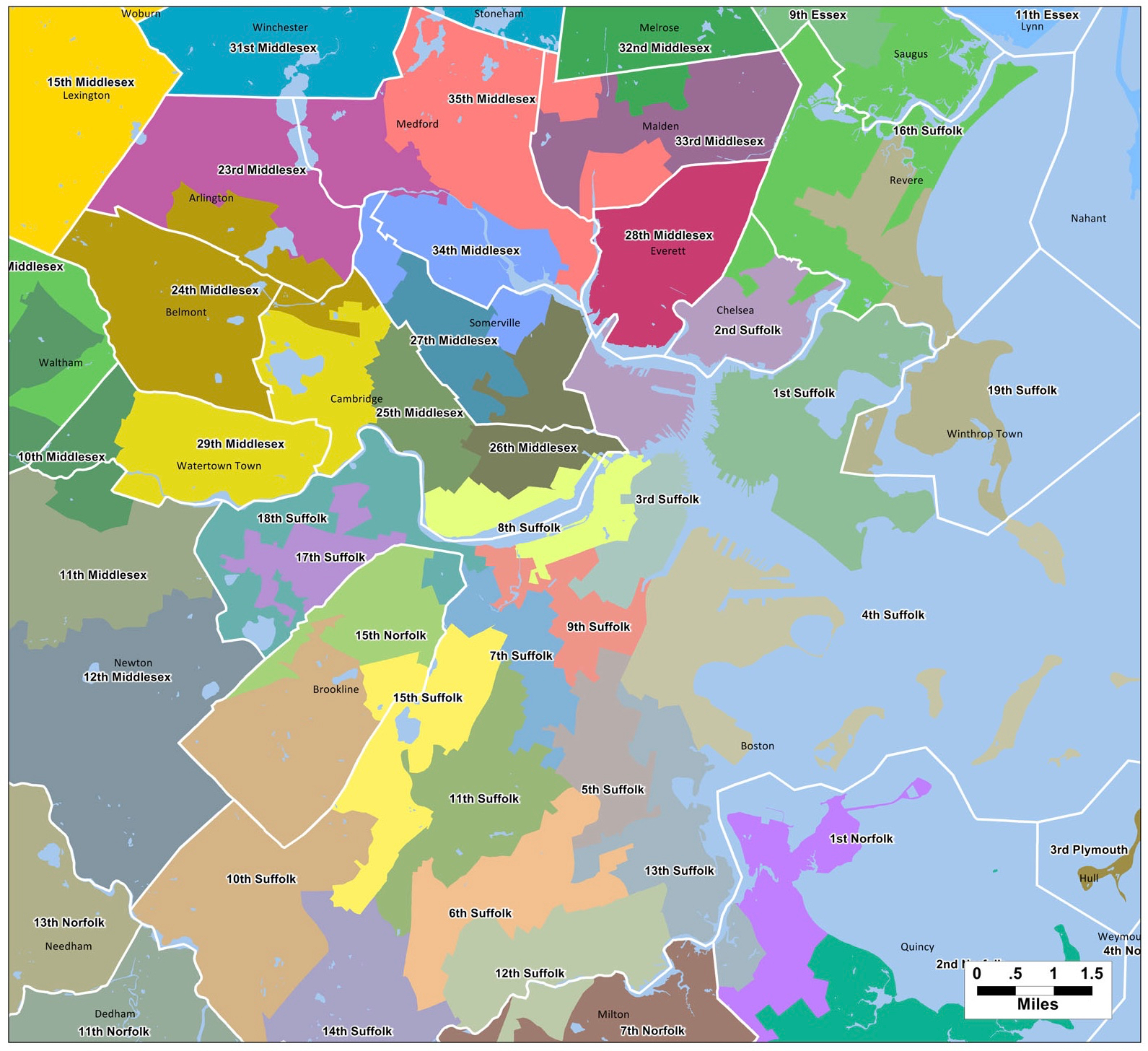
Map of Massachusetts House of Representatives districts for Suffolk County, apportioned in 2011

Massachusetts House of Representatives' 6th Suffolk district in the United States is one of 160 legislative districts included in the lower house of the Massachusetts General Court. It covers part of the city of Boston in Suffolk County. Democrat Russell Holmes of Mattapan has represented the district since 2011.

The current district geographic boundary overlaps with those of the Massachusetts Senate's Norfolk and Suffolk district, 1st Suffolk district, and 2nd Suffolk district.

== Representatives ==
- John A. Andrew, circa 1858
- George P. Clapp, circa 1858
- Martin Brimmer, 1859-1861
- Thornton K. Lothrop, circa 1859
- Harvey Newton Collison, circa 1888
- Edward J. Flynn, circa 1888
- Cornelius J. Driscoll, circa 1920
- James William Hayes, circa 1920
- Patrick J. Melody, circa 1920
- John Taylor Tynan, circa 1951
- Elaine Noble, 1977-1979
- Shirley Owens-Hicks
- Willie Mae Allen, 2007-2011
- Russell E. Holmes, 2011-current

== See also ==
- List of Massachusetts House of Representatives elections
- Other Suffolk County districts of the Massachusetts House of Representatives: 1st, 2nd, 3rd, 4th, 5th, 7th, 8th, 9th, 10th, 11th, 12th, 13th, 14th, 15th, 16th, 17th, 18th, 19th
- List of Massachusetts General Courts
- List of former districts of the Massachusetts House of Representatives

== Images ==
Portraits of legislators

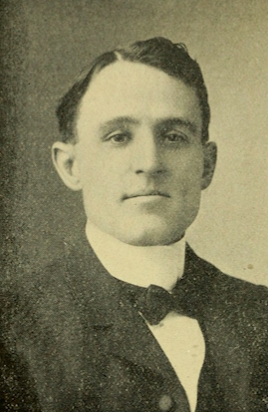
Philip McGonagle

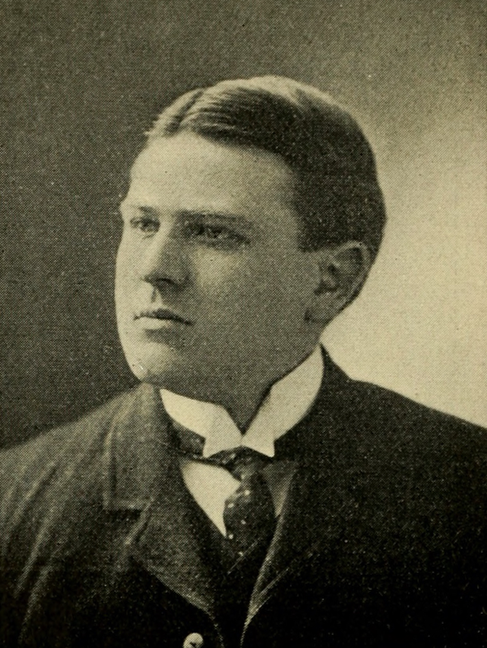
Thomas Grady

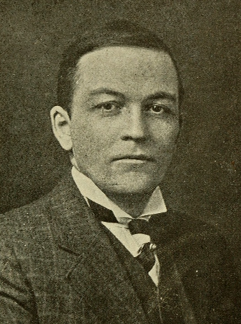
James Hayes

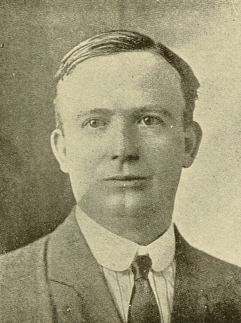
John Craig

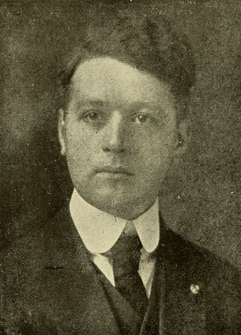
Thomas Donovan

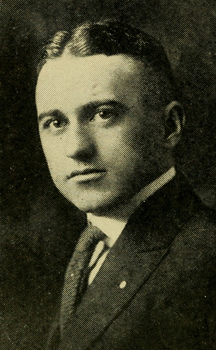
Andrew Gorey

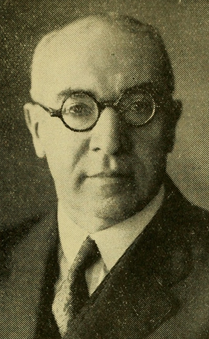
John Logue

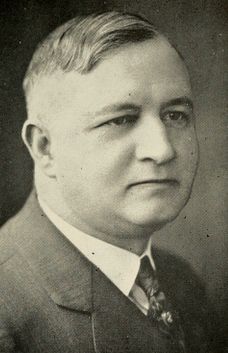
John Wenzler

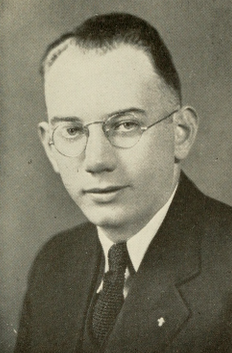
Martin Schofield

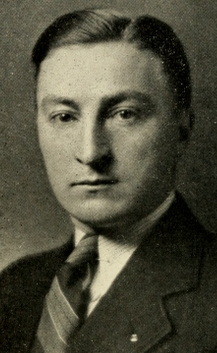
John Powers

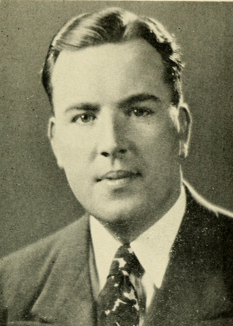
John Flaherty

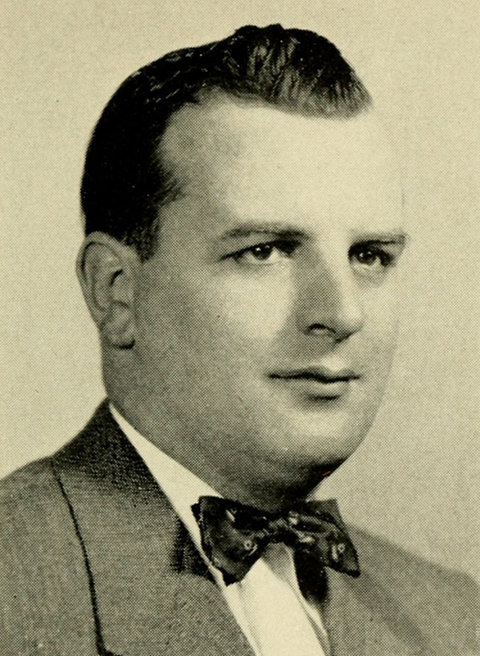
John Taylor Tynan

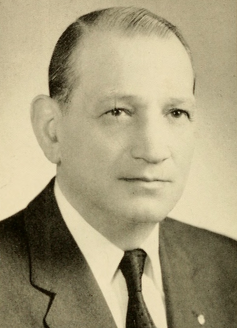
Charles Iannello

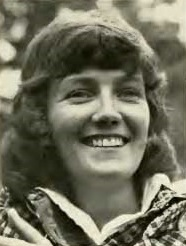
Elaine Noble

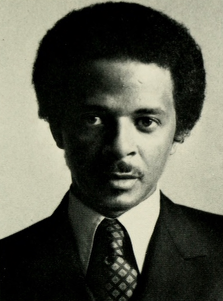
Royal Bolling Jr.

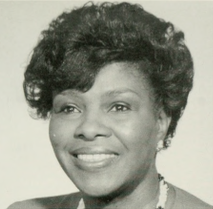
Shirley Owens-Hicks

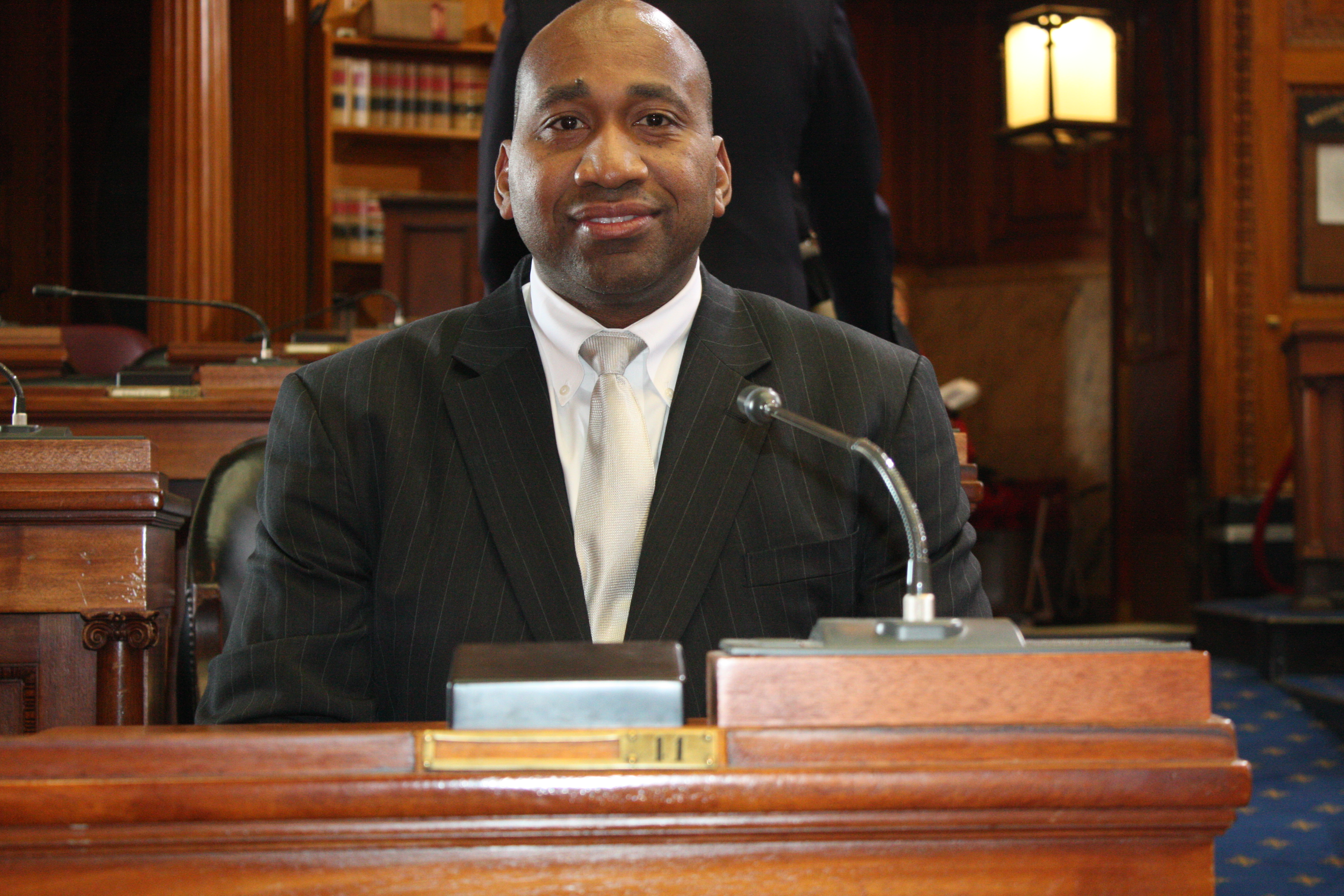
Russell Holmes
