= Jeffrey Sanchez (politician) =

Massachusetts politician

Jeffrey Sánchez
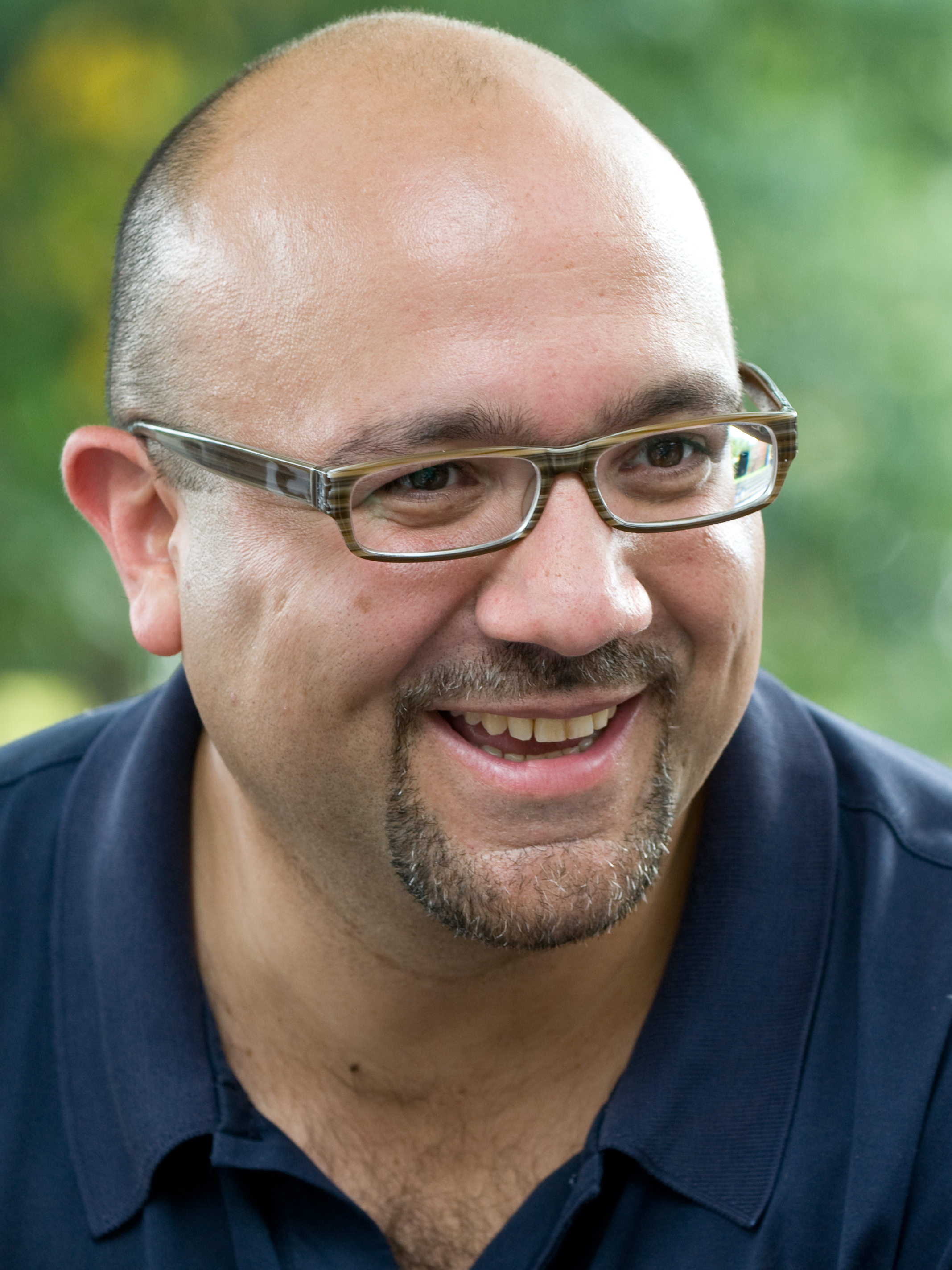

Chair of the Ways and Means Committee of the Massachusetts House of Representatives
- In office July 17, 2017 – January 2, 2019
- Preceded by: Brian Dempsey
- Succeeded by: Aaron Michlewitz

Member of the Massachusetts House of Representatives from the 15th Suffolk district
- In office January 2003 – January 2, 2019
- Preceded by: Kevin Fitzgerald
- Succeeded by: Nika Elugardo

Personal details
- Born: July 19, 1969 (age 57) New York City, New York, U.S.
- Party: Democratic
- Spouse: Brenda Lorena Cross
- Children: 2
- Education: University of Massachusetts Boston (BA); Harvard University (MPA)

Jeffrey Sánchez (born July 19, 1969) is an American politician who served as a member of the Massachusetts House of Representatives from 2003 to 2019. He represented the Fifteenth Suffolk district, which is made up of the Boston communities Mission Hill, Jamaica Plain, and Roslindale, as well as Precinct 5 of the Town of Brookline.

== Early life and education ==
Sánchez was born in the Washington Heights neighborhood of Manhattan and raised in the Boston neighborhood of Mission Hill. He graduated from the University of Massachusetts Boston, where he earned a Bachelor of Arts degree in legal education. Later, he attended the John F. Kennedy School of Government at Harvard University, where he received a Master in Public Administration in 2011 and was a Rappaport Urban Scholar.

== Career ==
Before running for the Massachusetts House of Representatives, Sánchez served as Mayor Thomas Menino’s liaison to the Hispanic community for six years. He previously worked in San Diego as a financial management advisor and investment banker. In 2000, Sánchez led Boston’s efforts to ensure its population was accurately counted in the U.S. census.

Sánchez endorsed Hillary Clinton during her 2008 Democratic primary campaign for U.S. president.

=== Massachusetts House of Representatives ===
Sánchez began his first term in the Massachusetts House of Representatives in 2003. In his second term, he served as vice-chair of the Joint Committee on Economic Development and Emerging Technologies. Sánchez chaired the Joint Committee on Public Health from 2009 to 2014 and became chairman of the Joint Committee on Health Care Financing in 2015. On July 17, 2017, Sánchez was confirmed as chairman of the House Committee on Ways and Means.

During Sánchez's 2018 run for re-election, he was defeated in the Democratic primary by newcomer Nika Elugardo 47 percent to 52 percent. Elugardo went on to win the general election after running unopposed.

=== Defense of the Judge Rotenberg Center ===
While serving in the Massachusetts House of Representatives, Sánchez staunchly opposed any legislation that would have prohibited the Judge Rotenberg Center (JRC) from using powerful electric shocks and other aversives to punish its disabled residents. On multiple occasions, Sánchez physically restrained his disabled nephew (a resident of the JRC) as he formally argued against such legislation, in order to demonstrate how difficult his nephew was to control. Sánchez said he considered electric shocks preferable to constant physical restraint or sedation and believed the shocks had a better chance of keeping his nephew from harming himself. In 2012, Bill Allan of the Disability Policy Consortium claimed that Sánchez was singlehandedly responsible for halting reform legislation in Massachusetts, an allegation Sánchez dismissed.

The extreme methods of punishment used by the JRC (an institution based in Canton, Massachusetts that provides schooling, housing and treatment to individuals with behavioral, emotional and developmental disorders) have been condemned by the United Nations special rapporteur on torture, some former JRC residents and their family members, and many disabled activists/advocates and politicians. No other facility in the United States is known to currently utilize such methods. A ban on the JRC's shock device was implemented in 2020 by the U.S. Food and Drug Administration, but was overturned in court in 2021.

During the JRC's fiscal year ending June 30, 2021, Sánchez joined the organization's board of directors. He has continued to serve on its board in subsequent years.

== Personal life ==
As of 2011, Sánchez resided in the Jamaica Plain neighborhood of Boston with his wife Brenda and two daughters.

| Preceded by Kevin Fitzgerald | Member of the Massachusetts House of Representatives; 2003-2019 | Succeeded by Nika Elugardo |
