= Royal L. Bolling Jr. =

American politician and businessman (born 1944)

Royal Lee Bolling, Jr.
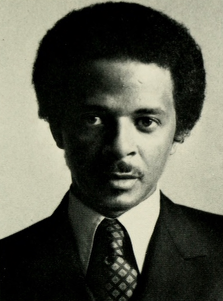
- Bolling, circa 1983

Member of the Massachusetts House of Representatives from the [data missing] district
- In office 1973–1986
- Preceded by: Franklin W. Holgate
- Succeeded by: Shirley Owens-Hicks

Personal details
- Born: May 1, 1944
- Party: Democratic
- Relations: Bruce Bolling (brother)
- Parent: Royal L. Bolling Sr.
- Education: Boston University; Suffolk University

Royal Lee Bolling Jr. (born May 1, 1944) is an American businessman and politician.

Bolling was born in Boston, Massachusetts. He went to Dorchester High School, Boston University, and Suffolk University. Bolling was involved with the real estate and construction businesses. He is an African-American and a Democrat. Bolling served in the Massachusetts House of Representatives from 1973 to 1986. His father was Royal L. Bolling who also served in the Massachusetts General Court and his brother Bruce Bolling served on the Boston City Council.

== See also ==
- 1973–1974 Massachusetts legislature
- Massachusetts House of Representatives' 15th Suffolk district
