= Chynah Tyler =

American politician

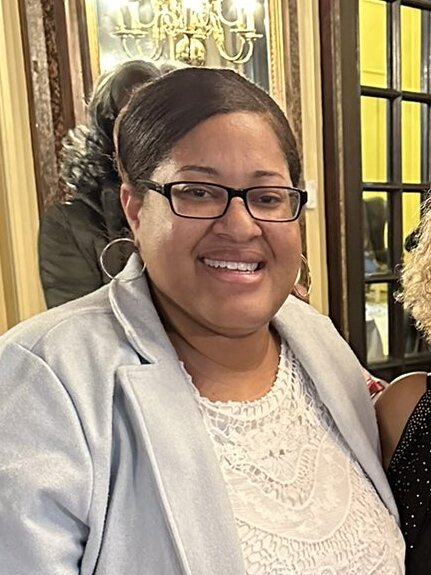
- Tyler in 2024

Member of the Massachusetts House of Representatives from the 7th Suffolk district
- Incumbent
- Assumed office January 4, 2017
- Preceded by: Gloria Fox

Personal details
- Party: Democratic
- Education: Northeastern University (BSc)

Chynah Tyler is an American politician from the Commonwealth of Massachusetts. She was elected to represent the 7th Suffolk district of the Massachusetts House of Representatives. She is a member of the Massachusetts Democratic Party and succeeded Gloria Fox in 2016. Tyler grew up in Boston, and attended Northeastern University, where she majored in criminal justice.

She is a member of the Massachusetts Black and Latino Legislative Caucus.

== See also ==
- 2019–2020 Massachusetts legislature
- 2021–2022 Massachusetts legislature
