= Nika Elugardo =

Massachusetts politician

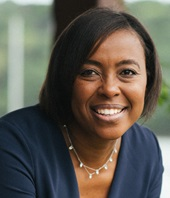

Member of the Massachusetts House of Representatives from the 15th Suffolk district
- In office January 2, 2019 – January 4, 2023
- Preceded by: Jeffrey Sanchez
- Succeeded by: Sam Montaño

Personal details
- Born: July 31, 1973 (age 53) Columbus, Ohio
- Party: Democratic
- Education: Massachusetts Institute of Technology (BS); Harvard University (MPP); Boston University (JD)
- Website: Campaign website

Nika C. Elugardo is an American attorney and politician. She served as a member of the Massachusetts House of Representatives representing Boston and Brookline for two terms from 2019 to 2023.

== Education ==
Elugardo earned her Bachelor of Science in Urban Planning from the Massachusetts Institute of Technology, a Master of Public Policy from the John F. Kennedy School of Government, and a Juris Doctor from the Boston University School of Law.

== Career ==
After graduating from law school, Elugardo worked at the National Consumer Law Center in Boston. Elugardo then served as the Jamaica Plain Liaison and Senior Policy Advisor to Massachusetts State Senator Sonia Chang-Díaz.

In the 2018 election, Elugardo mounted a successful primary challenge to incumbent Representative Jeffrey Sanchez.

On March 1, 2023, Massachusetts U.S. Senator Ed Markey announced that Elugardo would join his office as chief counsel.

== See also ==
- 2019–2020 Massachusetts legislature
- 2021–2022 Massachusetts legislature
