= Shirley Owens-Hicks =

American politician (born 1942)

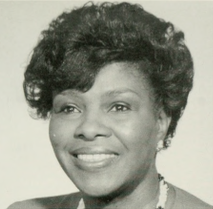
- Owen-Hicks, circa 2005

Member of the Massachusetts House of Representatives from the 6th Suffolk district
- In office 1987–2006
- Preceded by: Royal L. Bolling, Jr.
- Succeeded by: Willie Mae Allen

Personal details
- Born: April 22, 1942 (age 84) Demopolis, Alabama, United States
- Party: Democratic
- Education: Boston University; Harvard University (Ed.D.)

Shirley Owens-Hicks is an American Democratic politician from Boston, Massachusetts. She represented the 6th Suffolk district in the Massachusetts House of Representatives from 1987 to 2006, first winning her seat by primarying incumbent Royal Bolling Jr. Prior to that she served as a member of the Boston School Committee from 1984 to 1988. Her brother, Bill Owens, served in the Massachusetts Senate.

== See also ==
- 1987-1988 Massachusetts legislature
- 1989-1990 Massachusetts legislature
- 1991-1992 Massachusetts legislature
- 1993-1994 Massachusetts legislature
- 1995-1996 Massachusetts legislature
- 1997-1998 Massachusetts legislature
- 1999-2000 Massachusetts legislature
- 2001-2002 Massachusetts legislature
- 2003-2004 Massachusetts legislature
- 2005-2006 Massachusetts legislature
