= Gloria Fox =

American politician (1942–2024)

Gloria Lavera Fox
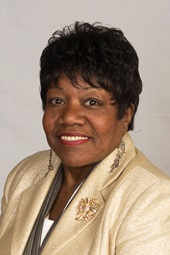
- Official portrait

Member of the Massachusetts House of Representatives from the 7th Suffolk district
- In office 1987 – January 4, 2017
- Preceded by: Doris Bunte
- Succeeded by: Chynah Tyler

Personal details
- Born: March 18, 1942 Boston, Massachusetts, U.S.
- Died: November 11, 2024 (aged 82)
- Party: Democratic
- Children: 2
- Education: Boston Public Schools
- Website: https://www.facebook.com/rep.gloriafox

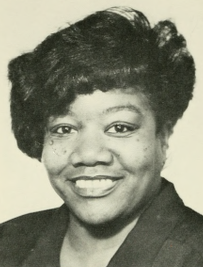
Official portrait, circa 1995

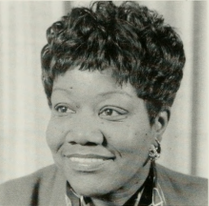
Official portrait, circa 2005

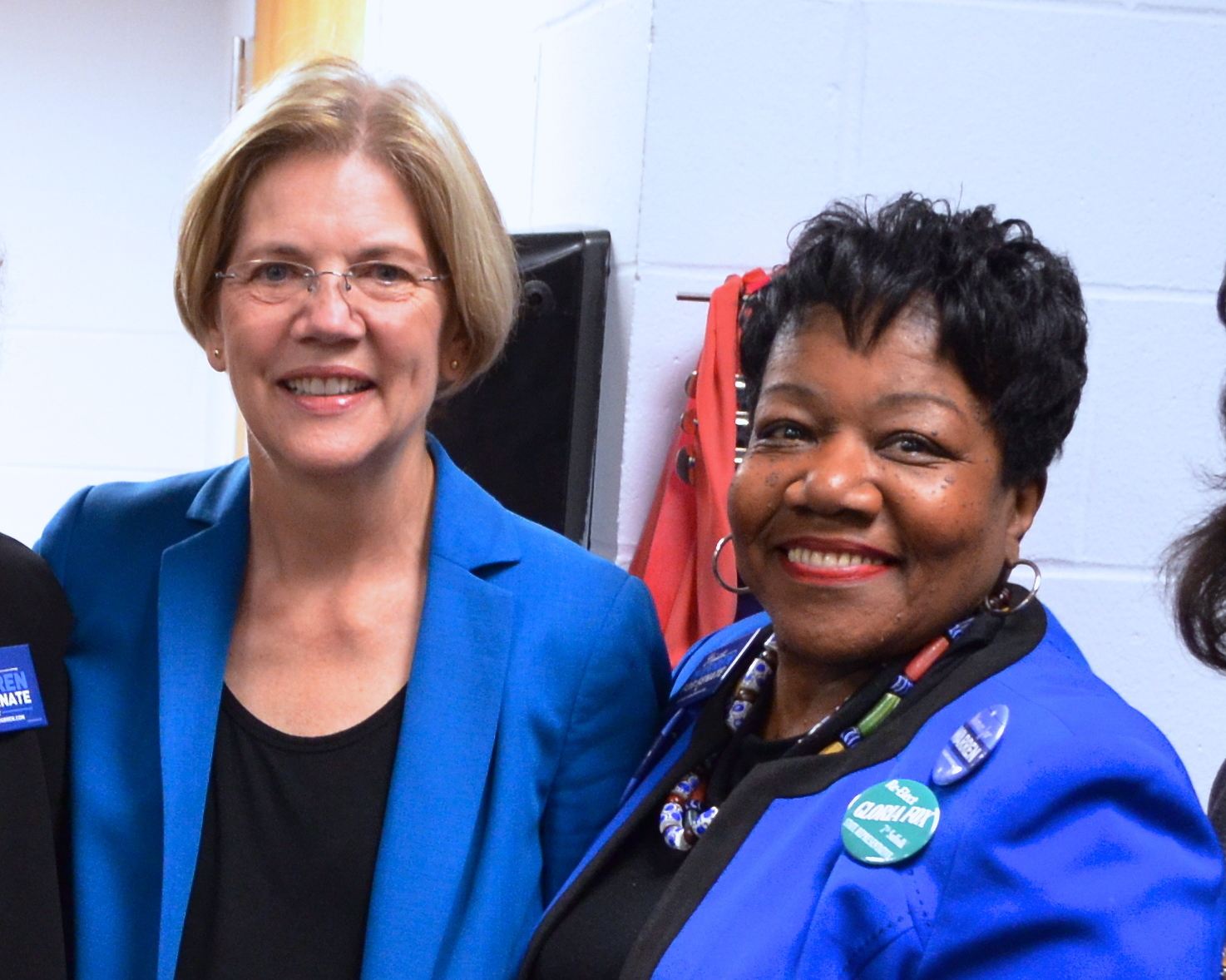
Fox with Elizabeth Warren in 2012

Gloria Lavera Fox (March 18, 1942 – November 11, 2024) was an American politician who was a member of the Massachusetts House of Representatives for the 7th Suffolk District. Fox represented the 7th Suffolk District from 1987 until her retirement in 2016.

== Early life ==
Fox was born in Boston on March 18, 1942. Raised as a foster child, Fox attended Boston and Everett public schools. She also completed the MIT Community Fellows program.

== Political career ==
Fox first ran for the 7th Suffolk seat in 1984, losing a write-in campaign against six-term incumbent and Democratic nominee Doris Bunte. Fox ran for the seat again in 1986, when Bunte announced her retirement from the legislature. Fox won the three-way Democratic primary and also the general election, where she was unopposed. Fox faced two challengers in the 2012 primaries, her first contested primary race since 1994.

Fox served on the Joint Committee on Housing as vice chair, the Joint Committee on Ways and Means, the House Committee on Steering, Policy and Scheduling, and the House Committee on Ways and Means. Her legislative work on criminal justice reform, child welfare and foster care, redistricting, Election Day voter registration, and eliminating health disparities in communities of color. When Fox retired from her seat in 2016, she was the longest serving woman in the Great and General Court.

Fox was a member of the Boston Delegation of the Massachusetts Legislature, the Massachusetts Caucus of Women Legislators, the Massachusetts Black and Latino Legislative Caucus, and the National Black Caucus of State Legislators. Her papers are now held at the State Library of Massachusetts.

In 2009, Fox came under scrutiny for a visit she made to the Old Colony Correctional Center in Bridgewater, Massachusetts. While visiting inmate Darrell Jones, Fox was accompanied by Jones' girlfriend, Joanna Marinova. Fox was criticized for bringing Marinova into an unsecured area through her legislative privileges. Fox responded by denying any wrongdoing, and that she was unaware that Marinova was Jones' girlfriend. On March 19, 2014 a jury found the Boston Herald liable in the libel suit brought by Marinova, citing the fact that no sexual acts occurred while Fox and Marinova visited the prison, as the Herald had reported.

Fox voted against casino gambling in Massachusetts, and opposed a 'three-strikes' bill that passed through the legislature and was signed by Governor Deval Patrick.

== Awards ==
In 2011, Fox received the Lifetime Achievement Award from the National Black Caucus of State Legislators for her community activism.

== Personal life ==
As a single mother, she raised two sons in the Whittier Street Housing Development in Roxbury. She worked as a community organizer before entering politics. She was active in the fight to stop the Southwest Expressway.

Fox died November 11, 2024, at the age of 82.

== See also ==
- List of Massachusetts General Courts (1985-2016)
