= Bill Owens (Massachusetts politician) =

American politician (1937–2022)

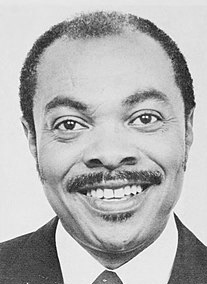
- Owens in 1991

Member of the Massachusetts House of Representatives from the 10th Suffolk district
- In office 1973–1975
- Preceded by: I. Edward Serlin
- Succeeded by: Mary H. Goode

Member of the Massachusetts Senate from the Second Suffolk district
- In office 1975–1983
- Preceded by: Michael LoPresti Jr.
- Succeeded by: Royal L. Bolling
- In office 1989–1993
- Preceded by: Royal L. Bolling
- Succeeded by: Dianne Wilkerson

Personal details
- Born: July 6, 1937 Demopolis, Alabama
- Died: January 22, 2022 (aged 84) Boston, Massachusetts
- Party: Democratic
- Children: 7
- Education: Boston University; UMass Amherst

William Owens (July 6, 1937 – January 22, 2022) was an American politician and businessman. He was the first Black state senator in the Massachusetts State Senate.

== Biography ==
Owens was born in Demopolis, Alabama, on July 6, 1937. He went to the English High School of Boston. Owens also attended Boston University, Harvard University and University of Massachusetts Amherst. Owens was a private consultant and lived in Mattapan, Boston, Massachusetts. Owens served in the Massachusetts House of Representatives from 1973 to 1975 as a Democrat.

Following the creation of a majority-Black State Senate seat in South Boston, he ran for and won the seat, defeating Royal L. Bolling. He then served in the Massachusetts Senate from 1974 to 1982. In the early 80's, Owens changed his party registration to Republican, frustrated with the tightly controlled State Senate and what he viewed as the Democratic Party's slow walk on issues of racial justice and economic equity. After losing re-election as a Republican to Royal L. Bolling in a rematch, he switched back to the Democratic party and, after defeating Bolling a final time, served in a final stint in the state senate from 1989 to 1993, losing the 1992 Democratic primary to his successor, Dianne Wilkerson.

As a legislator, Owens helped to create the Massachusetts state Office of Minority Business Assistance and the Summer Youth Jobs Program. He supported gun control. In the 1980s, he also "sponsored a bill that would have required state government to pay reparations to Massachusetts descendants of enslaved Black Americans." His sister, Shirley Owens-Hicks, served in the Massachusetts House of Representatives from 1987 to 2006.

Following a bout of COVID-19, Owens died in his sleep at a Brighton, Boston, nursing facility at age 84.

== See also ==
- Massachusetts Senate's 2nd Suffolk district
- 1973–1974 Massachusetts legislature
- 1975–1976 Massachusetts legislature
- 1977–1978 Massachusetts legislature
- 1979–1980 Massachusetts legislature
- 1981–1982 Massachusetts legislature
- 1989–1990 Massachusetts legislature
- 1991–1992 Massachusetts legislature

== Notes ==
Government offices
Preceded by I. Edward Serlin	Member of the Massachusetts Senate for the Massachusetts House of Representatives; 1973-1975	Succeeded by Mary H. Goode
Preceded by Michael LoPresti Jr. Royal L. Bolling	Member of the Massachusetts Senate for the Second Suffolk District; 1974-1982; 1988-1992	Succeeded by Royal L. Bolling; Dianne Wilkerson
