= Massachusetts House of Representatives' 15th Suffolk district =

American legislative district

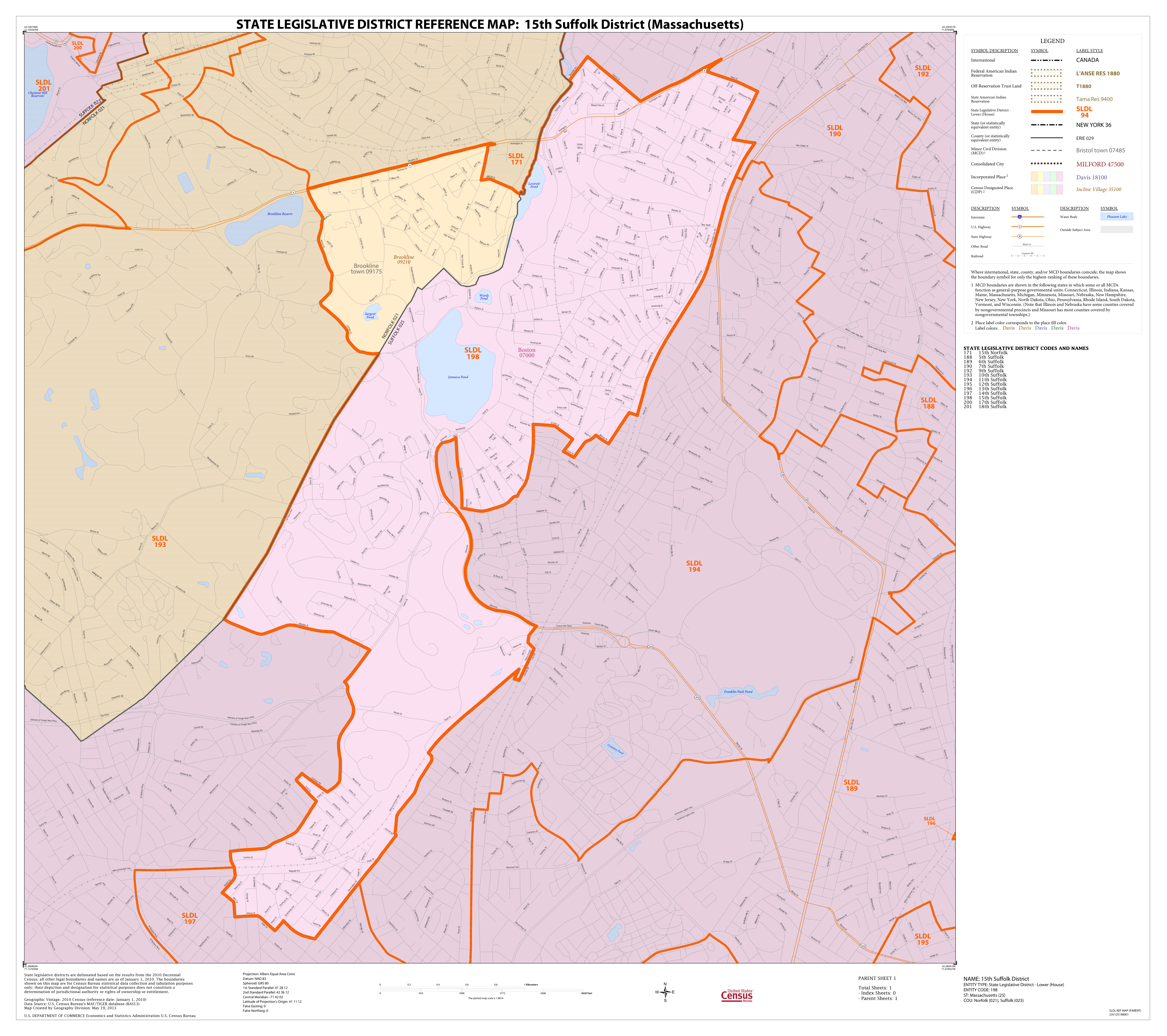
Map of Massachusetts House of Representatives' 15th Suffolk district, based on the 2010 United States census.

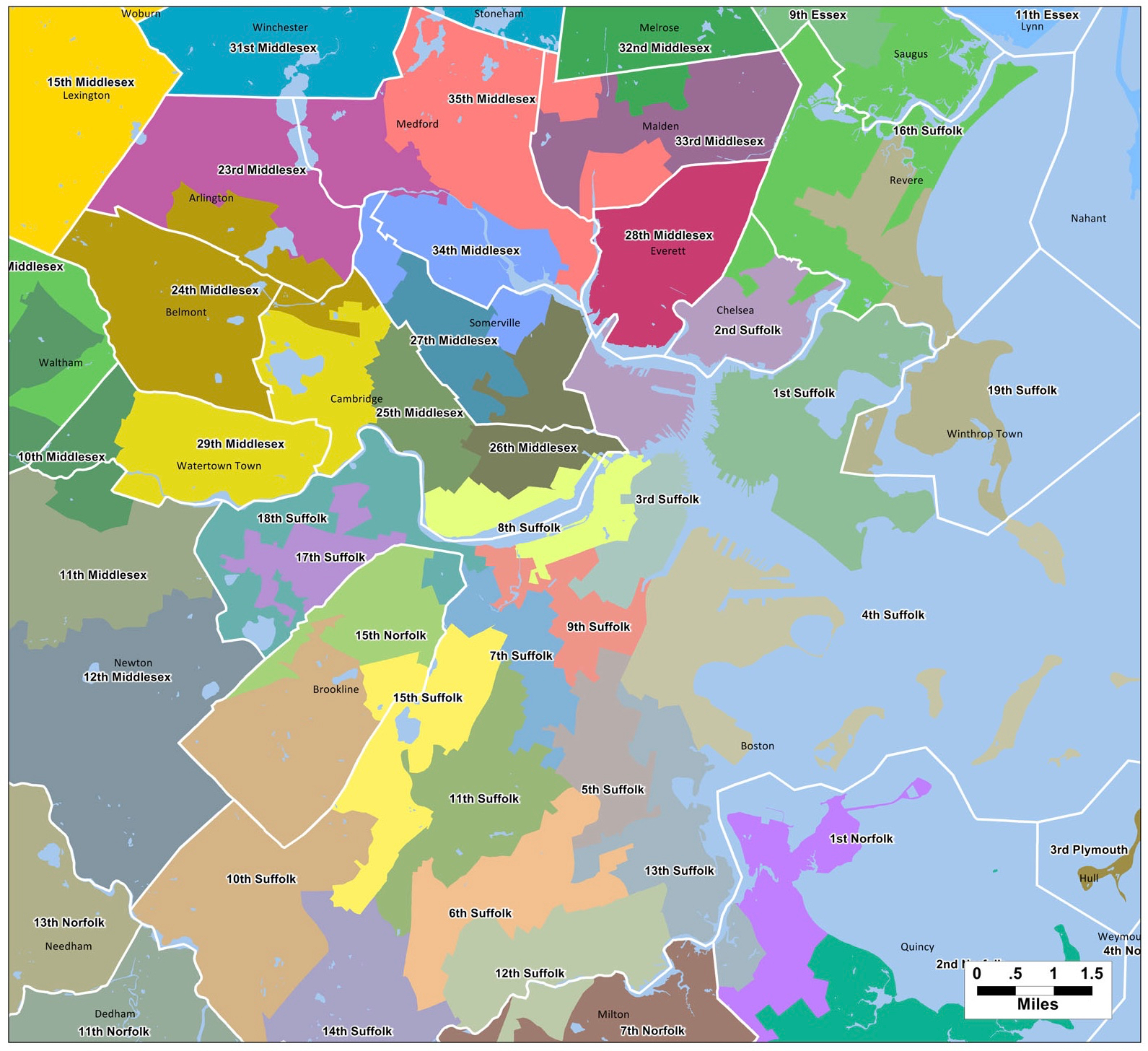
Map of Massachusetts House of Representatives districts for Suffolk County, apportioned in 2011

Massachusetts House of Representatives' 15th Suffolk district in the United States is one of 160 legislative districts included in the lower house of the Massachusetts General Court. It covers part of Brookline in Norfolk County and part of Boston in Suffolk County. Democrat Sam Montaño of Jamaica Plain has represented the district since 2023.

The current district geographic boundary overlaps with those of the Massachusetts Senate's 1st Middlesex and Norfolk district, Norfolk and Suffolk district, and 2nd Suffolk district.

== Representatives ==
- Michael Garity, circa 1888
- Frank Forrest Woods, circa 1888
- William A. Canty, circa 1920
- James J. Mulvey, circa 1920
- John Joseph Beades, circa 1951
- Francis Xavier Joyce, circa 1951
- John P. McMorrow (1953–1957)
- George V. Kenneally Jr. (1957–1963)
- Royal L. Bolling, Jr., circa 1975
- Kevin Fitzgerald, circa 2002
- Jeffrey Sanchez, January 2003 – January 2019
- Nika Elugardo, 2019-2023
- Sam Montaño, 2023–present

== See also ==
- List of Massachusetts House of Representatives elections
- Other Suffolk County districts of the Massachusetts House of Representatives: 1st, 2nd, 3rd, 4th, 5th, 6th, 7th, 8th, 9th, 10th, 11th, 12th, 13th, 14th, 16th, 17th, 18th, 19th
- List of Massachusetts General Courts
- List of former districts of the Massachusetts House of Representatives

== Images ==
Portraits of legislators

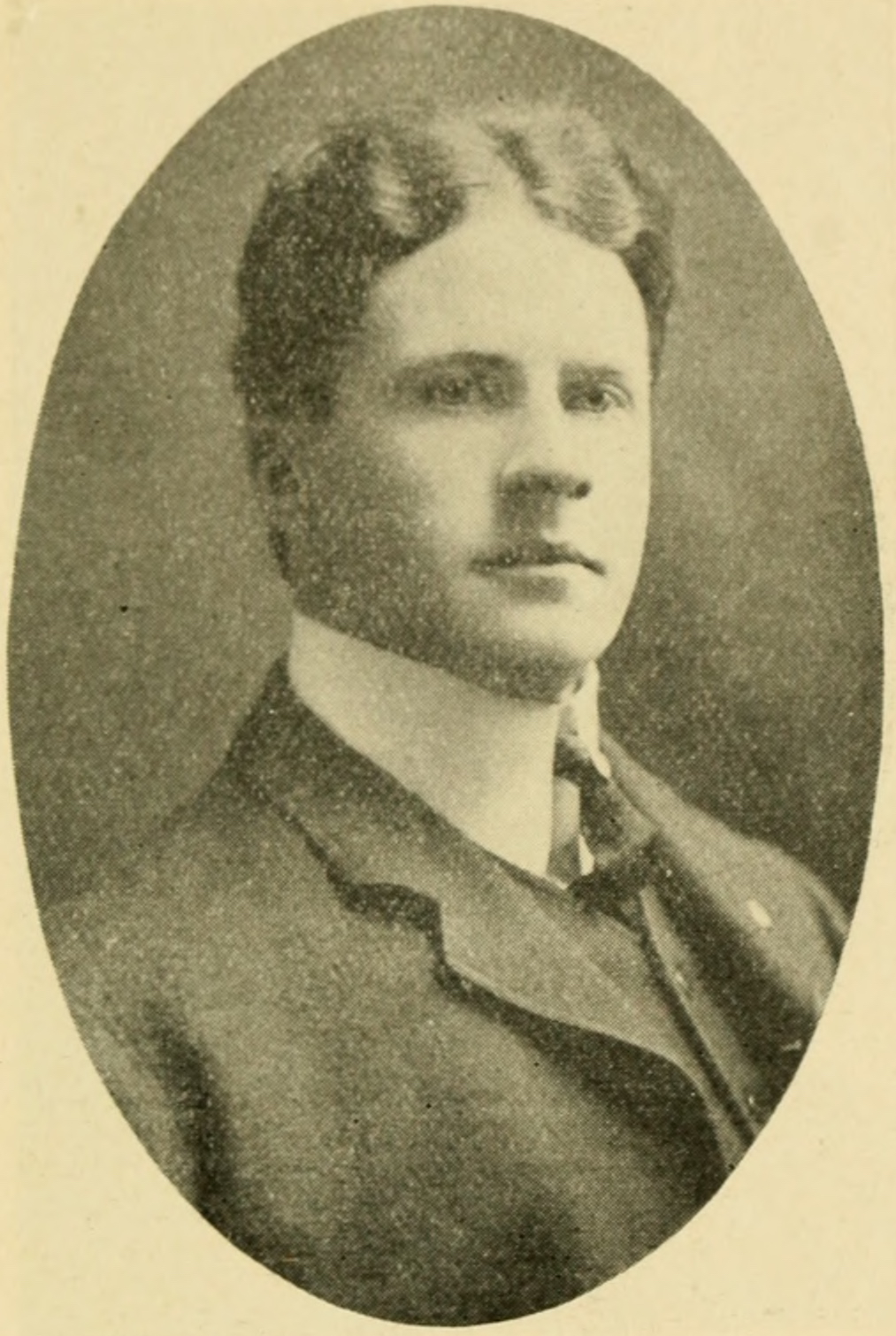
Edward Collins

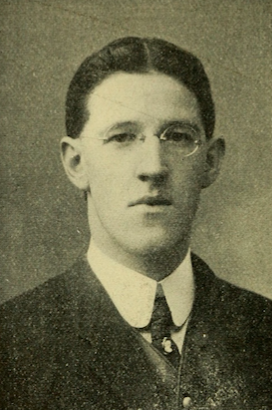
Patrick H. O'Connor

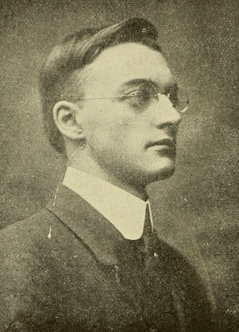
John Englert

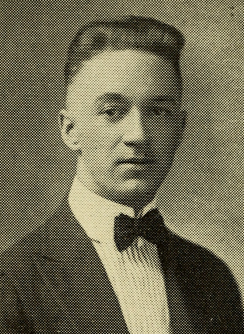
Stephen Mealey

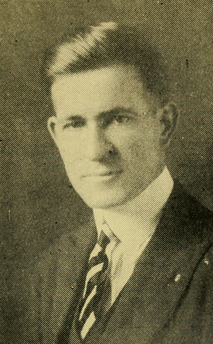
Peter Kelley

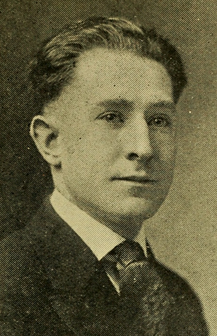
William Canty

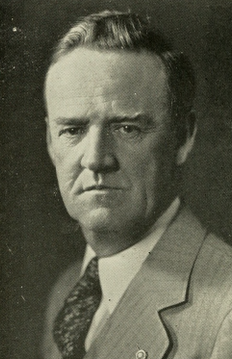
Francis Coyne

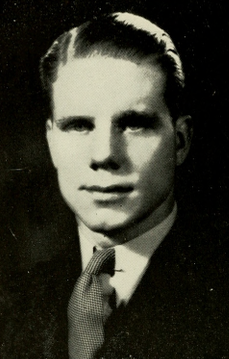
Timothy Murphy

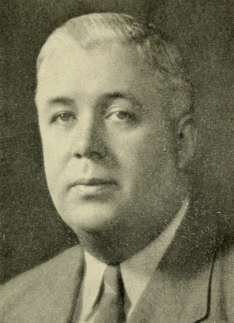
John Carroll

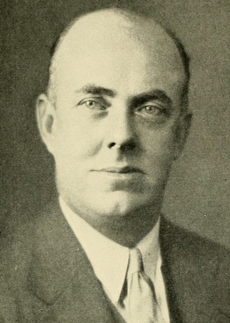
Thomas Reilly

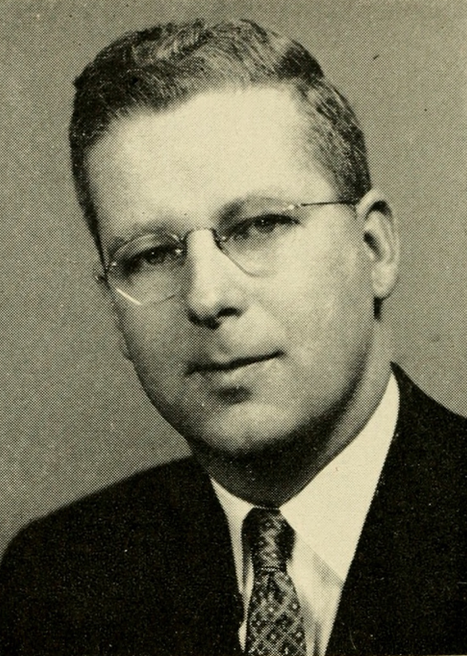
John Joseph Beades

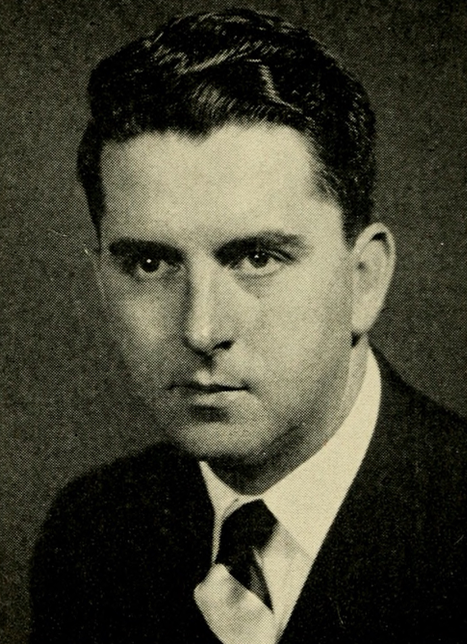
John Philip McMorrow

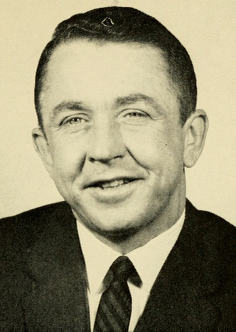
Charles Doyle

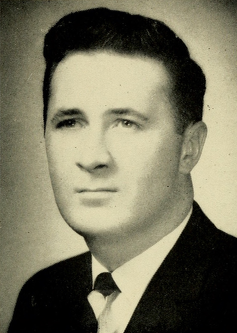
Robert Cawley

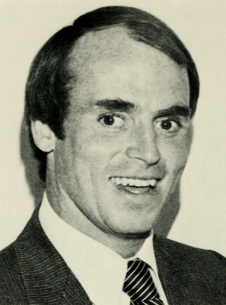
Thomas Finneran

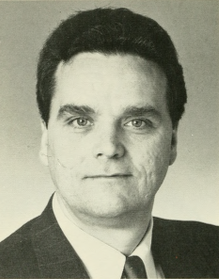
Kevin Fitzgerald

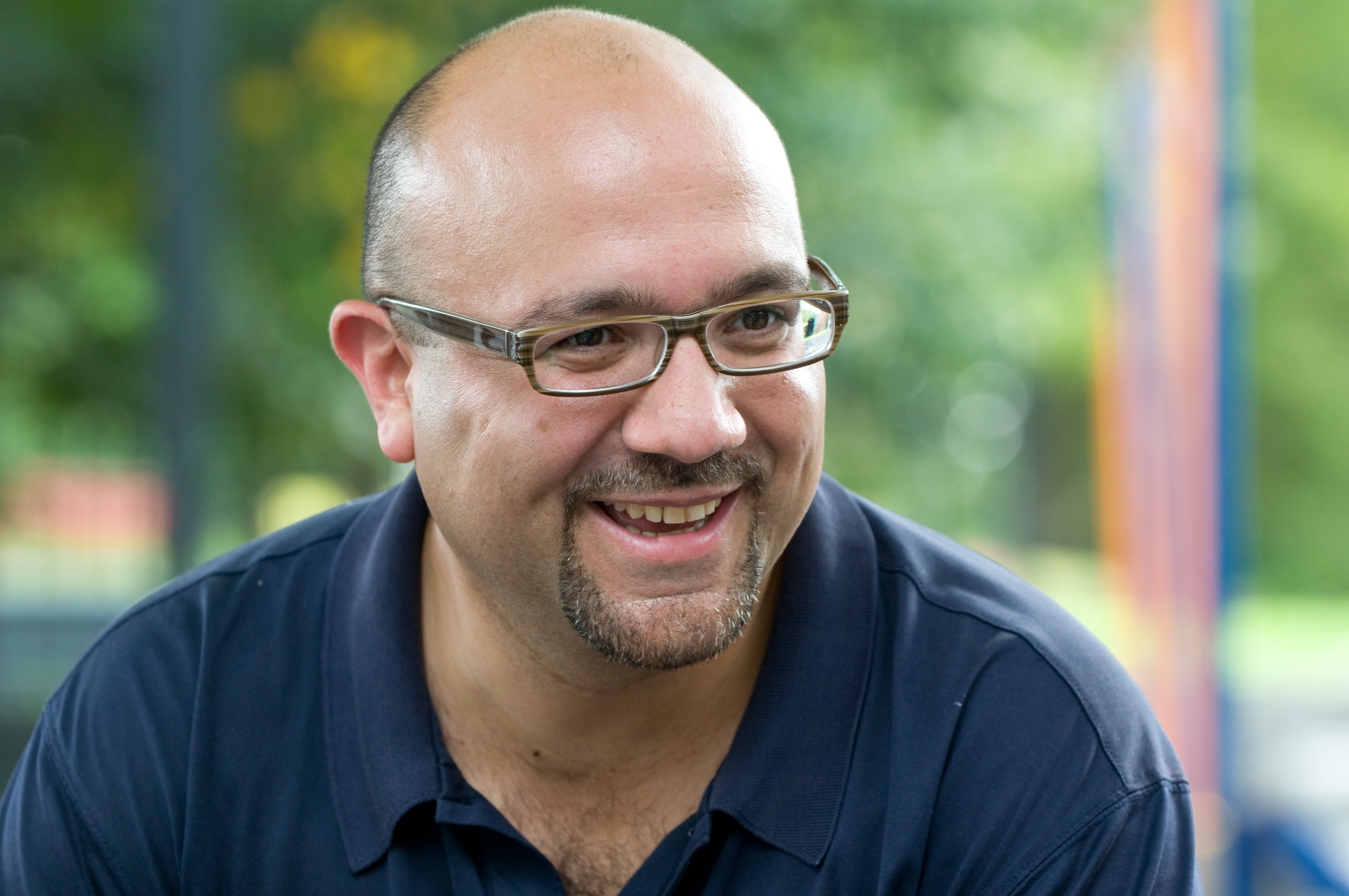
Jeffrey Sanchez

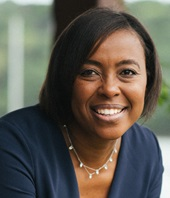
Nika Elugardo
