= Franklin W. Holgate =

American politician (1929-1974)

Franklin W. Holgate, Sr.
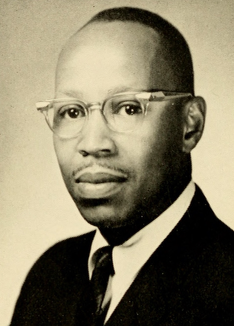
- Holgate, circa 1967

Member of the Massachusetts House of Representatives from the 7th Suffolk district
- In office January 6, 1965 – January 6, 1971
- Preceded by: William Bulger
- Succeeded by: Royal L. Bolling, Jr.

Personal details
- Born: Franklin William Holgate; May 3, 1929 Boston, Massachusetts, United States
- Died: May 21, 1974 (aged 45) Boston, Massachusetts, United States
- Party: Democratic
- Spouse: Ethany Holgate (m. 1956)
- Children: 2
- Education: Boston School of Public Administration

Franklin W. Holgate, Sr. (May 3, 1929 – May 20, 1974) was an American politician. He served as a Democratic member of the Massachusetts House of Representatives from 1965 to 1971.

== Professional career ==
Holgate was born on May 3, 1929, in Boston. He was valedictorian of the Boston Trade High School for Boys class of 1949 and worked as a sales representative for a wholesale plumbing business for many years. He owned Slade's restaurant from 1960 until he and his partners sold it to Boston Celtics player Bill Russell in 1964. He then ran a liquor store in South End for two years. Holgate also sold mutual funds and was a director of the Unity Bank & Trust Company.

== Politics ==
Holgate was active in Ward 12 Democratic Committee and served as its chairman for two years. From 1965 to 1971 he represented the 7th Suffolk district in the Massachusetts House of Representatives. During his time in office, Holgate participated in several organizations, including the Boston chapter of the NAACP, the local Chamber of Commerce, and the Citizens Urban Renewal Action Committee.

== Later life ==
Holgate started having eye problems in 1964, which caused him to spend a considerable amount of time in the hospital in 1966. He was declared legally blind in 1972, which resulted in five more hospitalizations. Holgate died on May 20, 1974, at Lemuel Shattuck Hospital in Jamaica Plain. He was 45 years old.

== See also ==
- 1967–1968 Massachusetts legislature
