= Francis X. Joyce =

American politician and local Boston figure

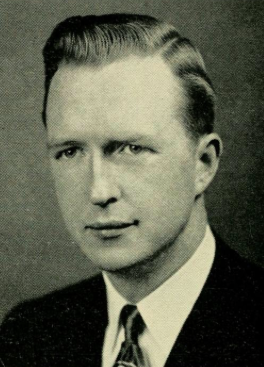

Member of the Massachusetts House of Representatives from the 15th Suffolk district
- In office 1949–1952
- Succeeded by: John P. McMorrow

Personal details
- Born: Francis Xavier Joyce; August 6, 1920
- Died: January 3, 1983 (aged 62) Dorchester, Massachusetts, U.S.
- Party: Democratic

Francis Xavier Joyce (August 6, 1920 – January 3, 1983) was an American politician who served in the Massachusetts House of Representatives and in the Boston City Council.

== Early life ==
Joyce was born on August 6, 1920. As a child he lived in South Boston, Massachusetts with his parents, Thomas J. Joyce and Mary K. (Dooley) Joyce, and his three brothers, Thomas J. Joyce (d. 1963), John F. Joyce (d. 1985), and Joseph P. Joyce (d. 1993). Joyce attended St. Augustine’s Grammar School, High School of Commerce, and Bentley School of Accounting and Finance. During World War II Joyce served in the United States Navy aboard an aircraft carrier for three years.

When first elected to the Massachusetts House of Representatives at the age of 28 in 1949, Joyce resided in the Dorchester neighborhood of the City of Boston. In 1953 Joyce married Ethel C. Franzosa in Dorchester, Massachusetts. The couple had two children.

Joyce's father, Thomas J. Joyce died in 1934. Around this time the family began to deliver ice and heating oil to homes in and around South Boston. The business later became Joyce Brothers Oil Co., and operated at 275 Old Colony Avenue in South Boston.

Joyce's oldest brother, Thomas J. Joyce was a graduate of Boston College High School and also a World War II veteran. When he died in 1963, Thomas J. Joyce held the position of Deputy State Secretary. Upon his passing, then State Secretary Kevin H. White, noted that “[t]he Commonwealth has lost a man whose name and public service is synonymous with integrity and complete dedication”. Joyce’s mother Mary K. (Dooley) Joyce died in 1966 leaving three sons, John F. Joyce, and Francis X. Joyce of Dorchester, and Joseph P. Joyce of Scituate, Massachusetts.

== Political career ==
Joyce was discharged from the United States Navy in 1945. A Democrat, he first ran for a seat in the Massachusetts House of Representatives in 1946. He lost that election by 750 votes. In 1949 Joyce was elected to the Massachusetts House of Representatives. He represented the 15th Suffolk District. At the time he was first elected at the age of 28, Joyce was one of the youngest serving members in the Massachusetts House of Representatives.

Joyce served in the Massachusetts House of Representatives from 1949-1952. In the House Joyce Chaired the House Committee on Municipal Finance. He also served as a member of the House Committee on Metropolitan Affairs. During his time in the House, Joyce advocated for reapportioning fiscal responsibility for operating the metropolitan parks and transit systems more fairly between the City of Boston, and the other regional municipalities that those systems served.

In 1945 the City of Boston was in a state of steady decline and: “. . . on its way to becoming a ghost town-- a run-down, worn-out relic of the past, rapidly discouraging any further investment or any significant interest.” In 1949 the City of Boston adopted a new city charter to help stem the decline. The new charter replaced the city’s then current twenty-two-member city council elected by district with a new nine-member city council elected at large. To fill the seats on the new city council, the people of Boston turned to: “. . . such other young and promising World War II veterans as twenty-eight-year-old Frederick Hailer of Roslindale and thirty-one-year-old Francis X. Joyce . . . .” Endorsed by "a liberal political action group" known as the New Boston Committee, Joyce won a seat on the new nine- member city council in 1951. During his first term on the city council, in 1952 Joyce challenged then Congressman John W. McCormack in a Democratic primary election in the 12th Congressional District in Massachusetts. In 1953 Joyce lost a bid for re-election to the city council.

== Life outside politics ==
In 1954 Joyce was appointed to an official position by the Boston City Council. He held this position and remained active in the family heating oil business until died of an aneurism in Carney Hospital in Dorchester on January 3, 1983.
