= Willie Mae Allen =

American community activist and politician

Member of the Massachusetts House of Representatives for the 6th Suffolk District
- In office 2007–2011
- Preceded by: Shirley Owens-Hicks
- Succeeded by: Russell Holmes

Personal details
- Born: February 11, 1937 (age 89) Camden, South Carolina
- Party: Democratic
- Education: Suffolk University

Willie Mae Allen (born February 11, 1937) is an American community activist and politician from Boston who represented the 6th Suffolk District in the Massachusetts House of Representatives from 2007 to 2011.

Allen was an unsuccessful candidate for the Boston City Council in 1983 and 1985 (at-large) and the Boston School Committee in 1987 (District 4). From 1988 to 2004 she was the Democratic state committee woman for the 2nd Suffolk district. In 2006 she ran for the Massachusetts House of Representatives seat that was being vacated by Shirley Owens-Hicks. She defeated former Boston deputy superintendent and Newark, New Jersey Police chief William R. Celester for the Democratic nomination and was unopposed in the general election. She was reelected in 2008 and did not run for reelection in 2010.

Outside of politics, Allen has worked as a camp director and lectured on social and political issues. She has B.S., B.A., and M.P.A. degrees from Suffolk University.
