= Massachusetts House of Representatives' 7th Suffolk district =

American legislative district

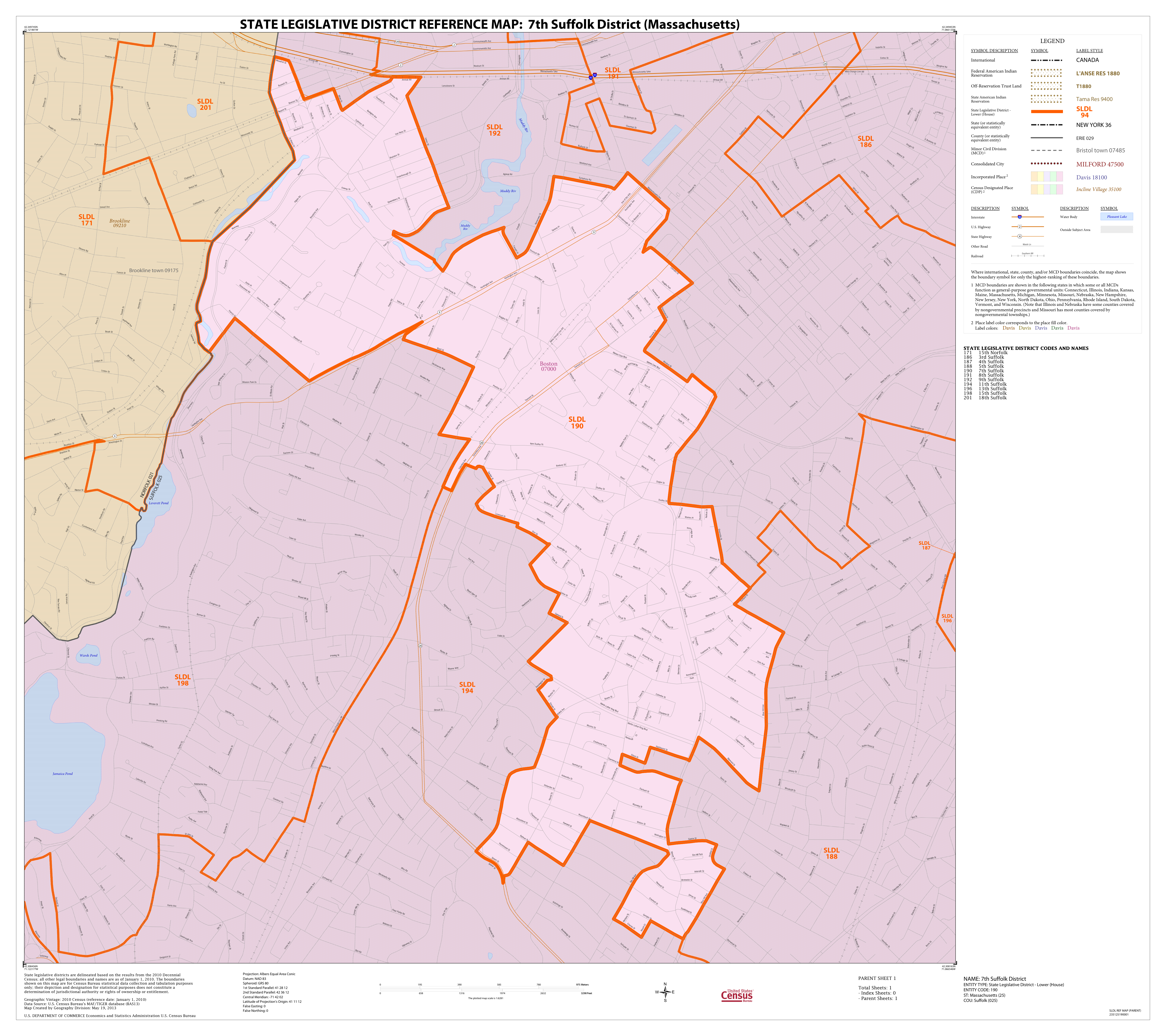
Map of Massachusetts House of Representatives' 7th Suffolk district, based on the 2010 United States census.

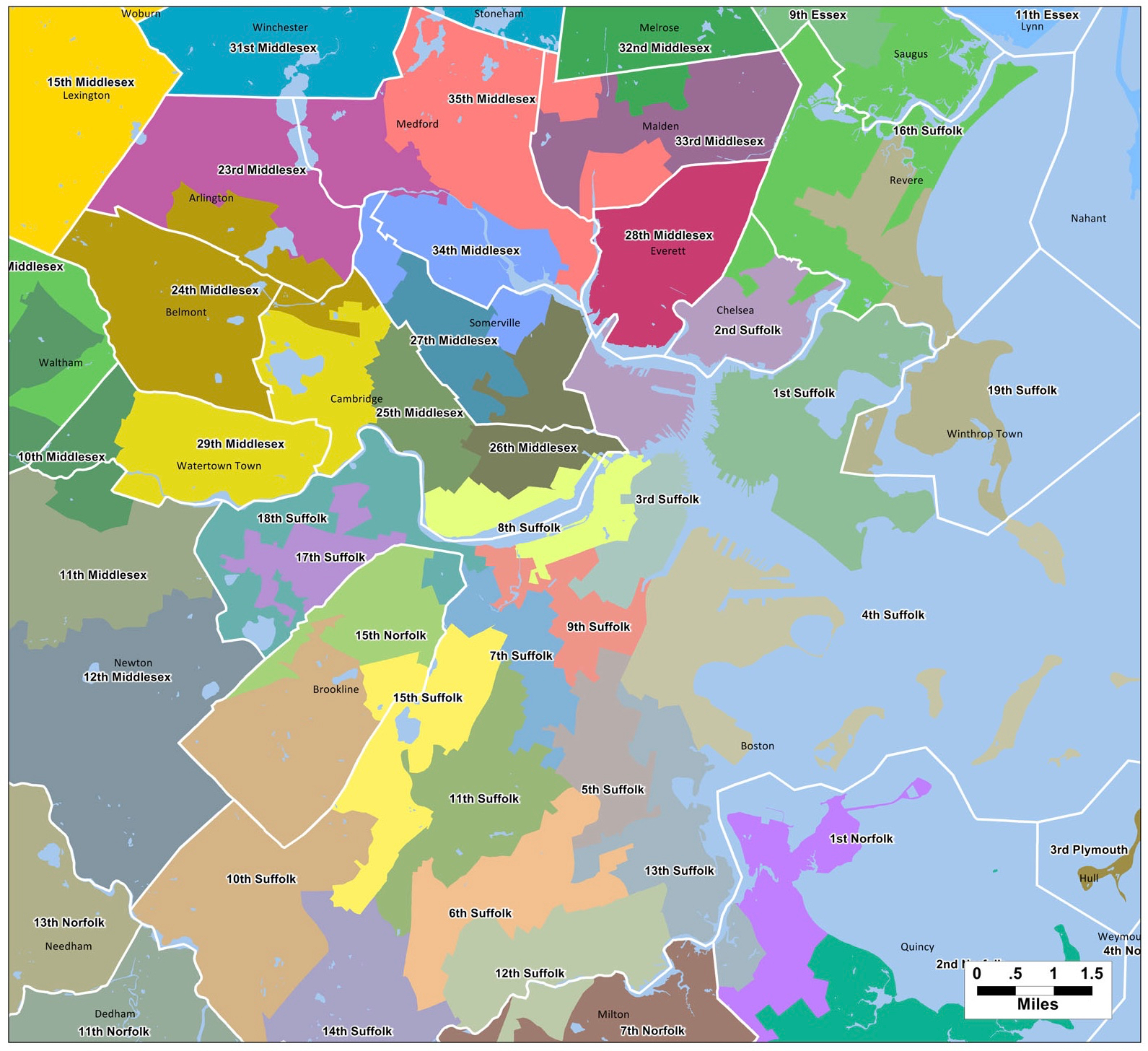
Map of Massachusetts House of Representatives districts for Suffolk County, apportioned in 2011

Massachusetts House of Representatives' 7th Suffolk district in the United States is one of 160 legislative districts included in the lower house of the Massachusetts General Court. It covers part of the city of Boston in Suffolk County. Democrat Chynah Tyler of Roxbury has represented the district since 2017.

The current district geographic boundary overlaps with those of the Massachusetts Senate's 2nd Suffolk district and 2nd Suffolk and Middlesex district.

== Representatives ==
- Samuel Hatch, circa 1858-1859
- Patrick Riley, circa 1858-1859
- John Doherty, circa 1888
- Thomas G. Farren, circa 1888
- Seth Fenelon Arnold, circa 1920
- William J. Conlon, circa 1920
- Davis B. Keniston, circa 1920
- Thomas E. Linehan, circa 1930s
- William F. Carr, circa 1951
- James Francis Condon, circa 1951
- Michael E. Haynes
- Raymond L. Flynn, circa 1975
- Doris Bunte
- Gloria Fox, 1985-2017
- Chynah Tyler, 2017-current

== See also ==
- List of Massachusetts House of Representatives elections
- Other Suffolk County districts of the Massachusetts House of Representatives: 1st, 2nd, 3rd, 4th, 5th, 6th, 8th, 9th, 10th, 11th, 12th, 13th, 14th, 15th, 16th, 17th, 18th, 19th
- List of Massachusetts General Courts
- List of former districts of the Massachusetts House of Representatives

== Images ==
Portraits of legislators

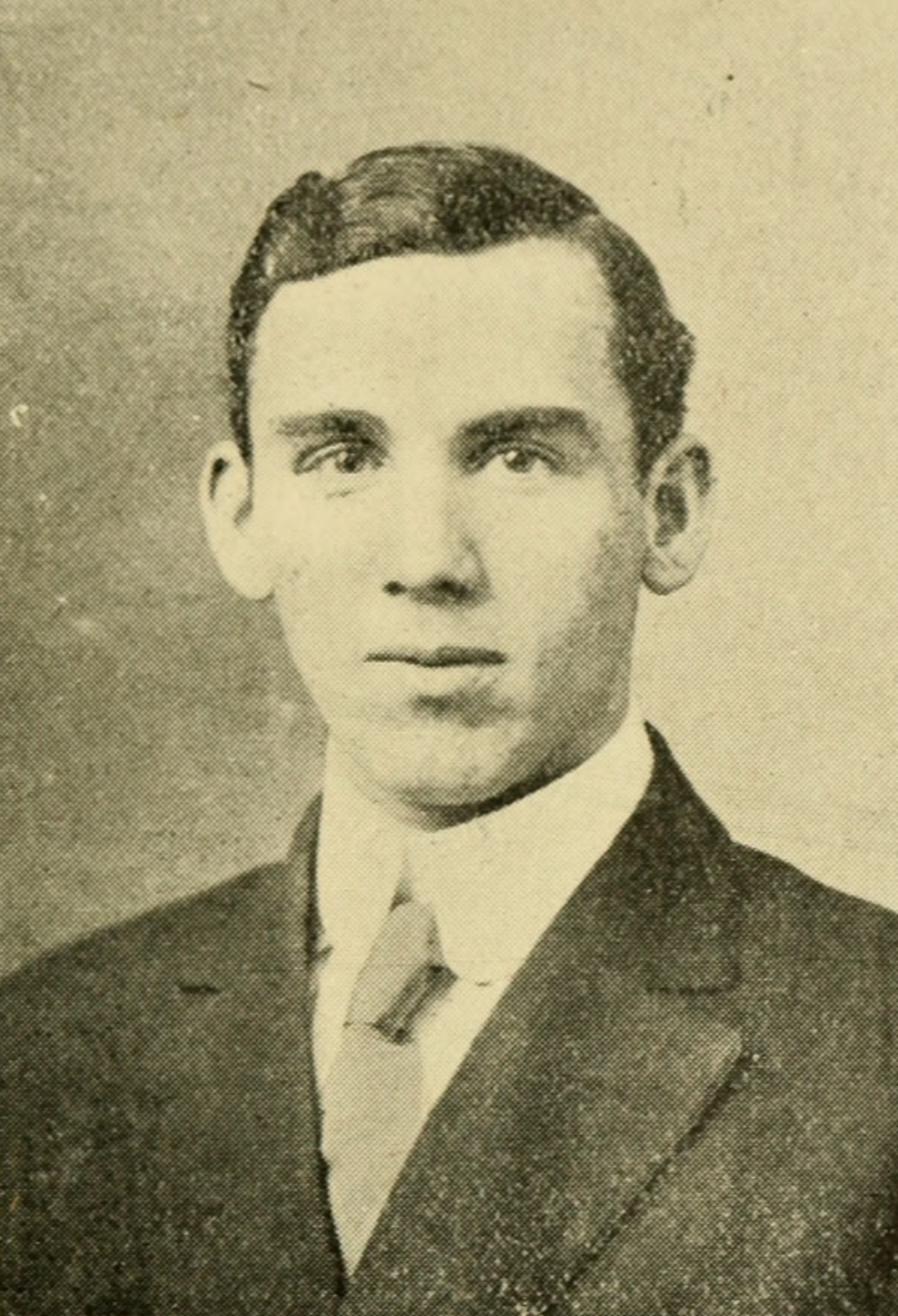
Bartholomew Brickley

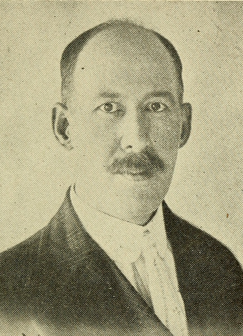
Joseph Wharton

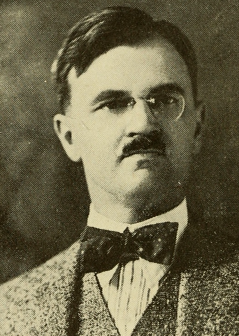
Seth Fenelon Arnold

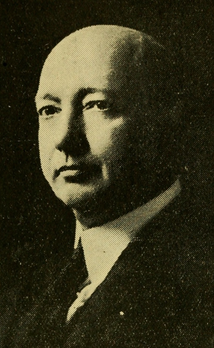
Albert Austin Sutherland

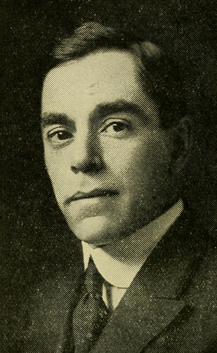
Davis Keniston

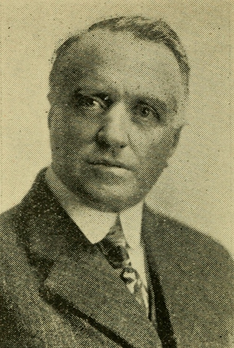
William Conlon

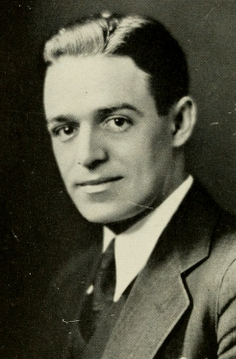
David Nagle

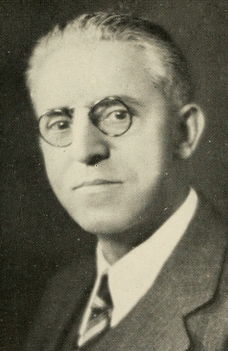
Owen Gallagher

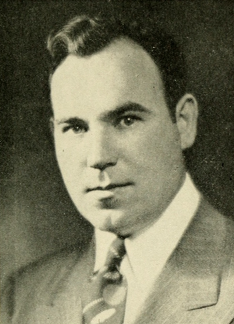
Patrick McDonough

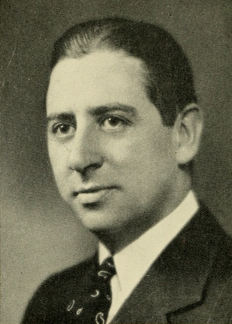
Richard Kelly

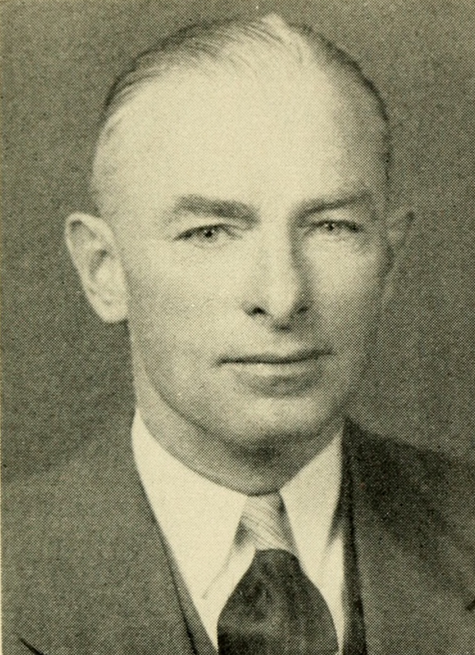
James Francis Condon

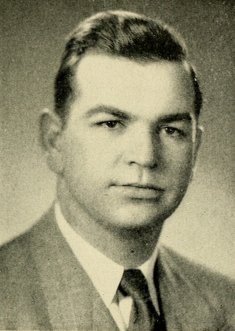
John Joseph Moakley

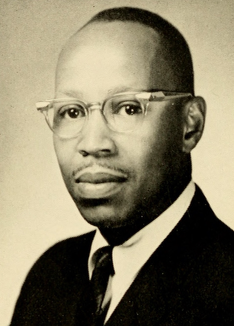
Franklin Holgate

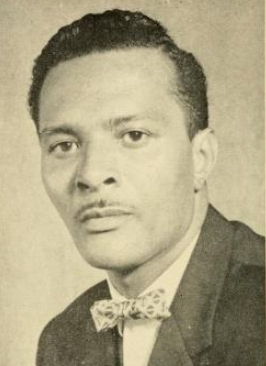
Royal Bolling

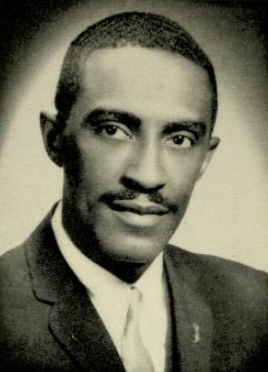
Michael E. Haynes

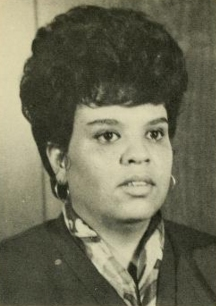
Doris Bunte

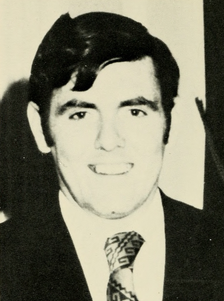
Raymond Flynn

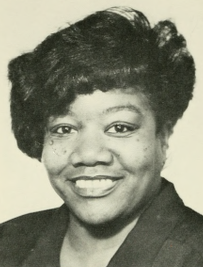
Gloria Fox
