= Royal L. Bolling =

American politician (1920–2002)

Royal Lee Bolling, Sr.
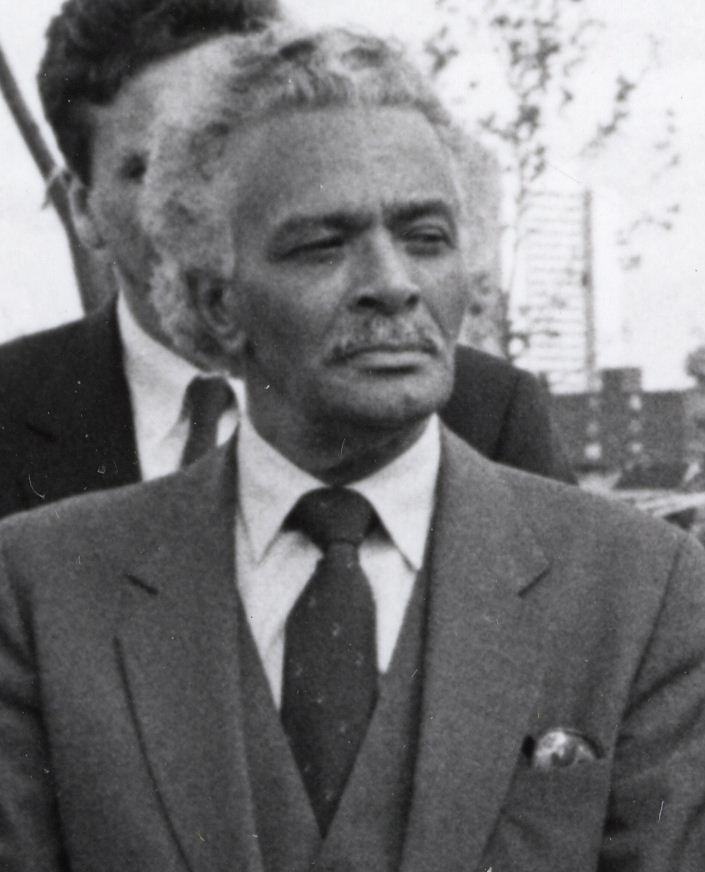
- Royal L. Bolling circa 1984

Member of the Massachusetts Senate from the Second Suffolk district
- In office 1983–1988
- Preceded by: Bill Owens
- Succeeded by: Bill Owens

Member of the Massachusetts House of Representatives
- In office 1971–1974
- Preceded by: Michael E. Haynes
- Succeeded by: Seat eliminated
- In office 1961–1968
- Preceded by: George Green / Oswald Jordan
- Succeeded by: Seat eliminated

Personal details
- Born: June 19, 1920 Dinwiddie County, Virginia, U.S.
- Died: July 16, 2002 (aged 82) Oak Bluffs, Massachusetts, U.S.
- Party: Democratic
- Spouse: Thelma Greene Bolling
- Children: Royal L. Bolling Jr. Bruce Bolling
- Education: Howard University; Harvard University; Boston University Law School

Royal Lee Bolling (June 19, 1920 – July 16, 2002) was a Massachusetts politician and head of a prominent African-American political family. While serving in the Massachusetts House of Representatives in 1965, he sponsored the state's Racial Imbalance Act, which led to the desegregation of Boston's public schools.

Bolling was a decorated World War II veteran, earning a Silver Star as a member of the segregated "Buffalo Soldiers" 92nd infantry division. He was also the founder of a successful real estate business, which he ran for 50 years.

== Early life and education ==
Bolling was born in Dinwiddie County, Virginia, to Granville and Irene Bolling. At the age of eight, he moved with his family to Framingham, Massachusetts. He grew up in a small yellow house on Walnut Street near Bowditch Field. He first showed a talent for politics when he ran for president of his predominantly white Framingham High School class and obtained endorsements from Massachusetts governor Leverett Saltonstall and Boston Mayor James Michael Curley. He became the school's first African-American class president and was re-elected twice before graduating in 1940.

He attended Howard University for a time, performing as a tap dancer in D.C.-area nightclubs to earn money for tuition, before leaving school to join the military. After the war he moved to Roxbury and continued his studies at Harvard University and Boston University Law School. While still a student he founded a real estate agency, from which he retired circa 1992. He was a member of Alpha Phi Alpha fraternity.

== Military service ==
In 1943, Bolling joined the segregated 92nd infantry division of the U.S. Army (also known as the "Buffalo Soldiers"), eventually rising to the rank of first lieutenant. He fought in German-occupied Italy, earning the Silver Star, Purple Heart, four Battle Stars, and the Combat Infantry Badge for "extraordinary leadership and valor under fire."

== Political career ==
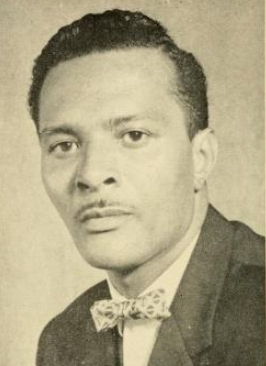
Bolling circa 1965

In 1961 he was elected to the Massachusetts House of Representatives, where he served six two-year terms. He represented the 11th Suffolk District (Ward 12) from 1961 to 1964 and the 7th Suffolk District from 1965 to 1968 and 1971 to 1974 (Wards 9 and 12 from 1961 to 1968 and Wards 8, 9, and 12 from 1971 to 1974). After a failed run in 1974, he ran again and in 1982 he was elected to the Massachusetts Senate, where he represented the Second Suffolk District from 1983 to 1988. He was defeated in the 1988 primary election by his longtime rival Bill Owens.

Bolling authored over 200 legislative initiatives in the course of his career. In 1963, he proposed the original Racial Imbalance Act, a version of which was signed into law by Governor John Volpe in 1965 and which led to the desegregation of Boston's public schools. He was instrumental in establishing Boston's METCO program, and secured the initial funding for Roxbury Community College. He advocated for the creation of the Second Suffolk Senate District, which led to the election of Boston's first black state senator, Bill Owens, in 1974.

In 1985 he sponsored the bill to redevelop the grounds of Boston State Hospital; dozens of mixed-income townhouses have since been built on the site, with many more planned. Bolling was an early advocate for gay rights, and chaired the Hispanic Commission, the state's first commission on issues affecting Latinos. He also chaired the senate's Public Service Committee. Widely recognized for his diplomatic skills, Bolling was chairman of the Special Legislative Committee on Foreign Trade and was hosted by heads of state around the world.

He was a member of the NAACP, the Urban League, the Black United Front, Veterans of Foreign Wars, and Disabled American Veterans.

== Personal life ==
He married Thelma "Angela" Greene in 1943 and had 12 children. His first son, Royal L. Bolling Jr., served in the Massachusetts House of Representatives; his second son, Bruce Bolling, was Boston's first African-American City Council president.

Bolling's wife died of pancreatic cancer in 2002. A month later, Bolling died at his vacation home in Oak Bluffs, Martha's Vineyard, Massachusetts, also of pancreatic cancer.

== Memorials ==
Senator Bolling Circle in Dorchester was named for Bolling in June 2006, at a dedication ceremony attended by former governor Michael Dukakis, former state senate president William M. Bulger, and many other Massachusetts politicians.

== See also ==
- 1963–1964 Massachusetts legislature
- 1971–1972 Massachusetts legislature
- 1973–1974 Massachusetts legislature
