= 2016 Massachusetts House of Representatives election =

- November 8, 2016

All 160 seats in the Massachusetts House of Representatives 81 seats needed for a majority
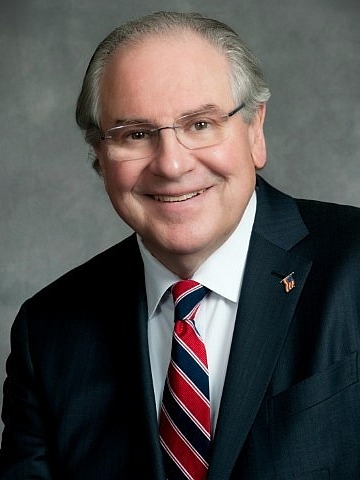

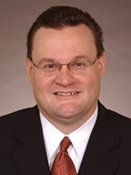
	Majority party	Minority party
Leader	Robert DeLeo	Bradley Jones Jr.
Party	Democratic	Republican
Leader since	January 27, 2009	November 21, 2002
Leader's seat	19th Suffolk	20th Middlesex
Last election	125 seats	35 seats
Seats before	126	34
Seats won	125	35
Seat change	▼1	▲1
- Results: Democratic hold Republican hold Republican gain
Speaker before election
Robert DeLeo
Democratic
Elected Speaker
Robert DeLeo
Democratic

The 2016 Massachusetts House of Representatives election was a legislative election for the Massachusetts House of Representatives. It was held on November 8, 2016, during the 2016 United States general elections, and during the state primaries. There was no significant change in the composition of the legislature, with incumbent Democratic legislators remaining mostly unopposed except in districts with a sizeable Republican voting bases.

== Predictions ==
Source	Ranking	As of
Governing	Safe D	October 12, 2016

== Results ==
District	Party	Incumbent	Status	Party	Candidate	Votes	%
1st Barnstable	Republican	Timothy R. Whelan	Won	Republican	Timothy R. Whelan	19,640	99.06%
1st Barnstable	Republican	Timothy R. Whelan	Won		All Others	187	0.94%
2nd Barnstable	Democratic	Brian Mannal	Retired	Republican	William L. Crocker Jr.	11,879	54.73%
2nd Barnstable	Democratic	Brian Mannal	Retired	Democratic	Aaron S. Kanzer	9,799	45.15%
2nd Barnstable	Democratic	Brian Mannal	Retired		All Others	25	0.12%
3rd Barnstable	Republican	David T. Vieira	Won	Republican	David T. Vieira	12,739	52.93%
3rd Barnstable	Republican	David T. Vieira	Won	Democratic	Matthew C. Patrick	11,317	47.02%
3rd Barnstable	Republican	David T. Vieira	Won		All Others	11	0.05%
4th Barnstable	Democratic	Sarah K. Peake	Won	Democratic	Sarah K. Peake	22,948	99.35%
4th Barnstable	Democratic	Sarah K. Peake	Won		All Others	150	0.65%
5th Barnstable	Republican	Randy Hunt	Won	Republican	Randy Hunt	18,096	99.23%
5th Barnstable	Republican	Randy Hunt	Won		All Others	141	0.77%
Barnstable, Dukes and Nantucket	Democratic	Timothy Madden	Retired	Democratic	Dylan A. Fernandes	13,030	51.65%
Barnstable, Dukes and Nantucket	Democratic	Timothy Madden	Retired	Independent	Tobias B. Glidden	9,601	38.06%
Barnstable, Dukes and Nantucket	Democratic	Timothy Madden	Retired	Independent	Jacob Norman Ferry	2,566	10.17%
Barnstable, Dukes and Nantucket	Democratic	Timothy Madden	Retired		All Others	29	0.11%
1st Berkshire	Democratic	Gailanne M. Cariddi	Won	Democratic	Gailanne M. Cariddi	15,675	99.40%
1st Berkshire	Democratic	Gailanne M. Cariddi	Won		All Others	95	0.60%
2nd Berkshire	Democratic	Paul W. Mark	Won	Democratic	Paul W. Mark	17,631	99.57%
2nd Berkshire	Democratic	Paul W. Mark	Won		All Others	76	0.43%
3rd Berkshire	Democratic	Tricia Farley-Bouvier	Won	Democratic	Tricia Farley-Bouvier	11,827	66.34%
3rd Berkshire	Democratic	Tricia Farley-Bouvier	Won	Independent	Christopher J. Connell	5,986	33.58%
3rd Berkshire	Democratic	Tricia Farley-Bouvier	Won		All Others	14	0.08%
4th Berkshire	Democratic	William "Smitty" Pignatelli	Won	Democratic	William "Smitty" Pignatelli	19,356	99.72%
4th Berkshire	Democratic	William "Smitty" Pignatelli	Won		All Others	54	0.28%
1st Bristol	Republican	Fred Jay Barrows	Won	Republican	Fred Jay Barrows	12,561	60.01%
1st Bristol	Republican	Fred Jay Barrows	Won	Democratic	Michael E. Toole	8,361	39.95%
1st Bristol	Republican	Fred Jay Barrows	Won		All Others	8	0.04%
2nd Bristol	Democratic	Paul R. Heroux	Won	Democratic	Paul R. Heroux	15,301	99.56%
2nd Bristol	Democratic	Paul R. Heroux	Won		All Others	68	0.44%
3rd Bristol	Republican	Shaunna L. O'Connell	Won	Republican	Shaunna L. O'Connell	10,520	58.59%
3rd Bristol	Republican	Shaunna L. O'Connell	Won	Democratic	Estele C. Borges	7,417	41.31%
3rd Bristol	Republican	Shaunna L. O'Connell	Won		All Others	18	0.10%
4th Bristol	Republican	Steven S. Howitt	Won	Republican	Steven S. Howitt	13,253	62.23%
4th Bristol	Republican	Steven S. Howitt	Won	Democratic	Paul W. Jacques	8,030	37.70%
4th Bristol	Republican	Steven S. Howitt	Won		All Others	14	0.07%
5th Bristol	Democratic	Patricia A. Haddad	Won	Democratic	Patricia A. Haddad	16,907	99.06%
5th Bristol	Democratic	Patricia A. Haddad	Won		All Others	160	0.94%
6th Bristol	Democratic	Carole A. Fiola	Won	Democratic	Carole A. Fiola	12,457	99.29%
6th Bristol	Democratic	Carole A. Fiola	Won		All Others	89	0.71%
7th Bristol	Democratic	Alan Silvia	Won	Democratic	Alan Silvia	9,594	99.58%
7th Bristol	Democratic	Alan Silvia	Won		All Others	40	0.42%
8th Bristol	Democratic	Paul Schmid, III	Won	Democratic	Paul Schmid, III	14,788	99.42%
8th Bristol	Democratic	Paul Schmid, III	Won		All Others	86	0.58%
9th Bristol	Democratic	Christopher M. Markey	Won	Democratic	Christopher M. Markey	15,010	99.40%
9th Bristol	Democratic	Christopher M. Markey	Won		All Others	90	0.60%
10th Bristol	Democratic	William M. Straus	Won	Democratic	William M. Straus	16,429	99.00%
10th Bristol	Democratic	William M. Straus	Won		All Others	166	1.00%
11th Bristol	Democratic	Robert M. Koczera	Won	Democratic	Robert M. Koczera	11,907	99.12%
11th Bristol	Democratic	Robert M. Koczera	Won		All Others	106	0.88%
12th Bristol	Republican	Keiko M. Orrall	Won	Republican	Keiko M. Orrall	15,855	98.80%
12th Bristol	Republican	Keiko M. Orrall	Won		All Others	192	1.20%
13th Bristol	Democratic	Antonio d. F. Cabral	Won	Democratic	Antonio d. F. Cabral	12,021	99.06%
13th Bristol	Democratic	Antonio d. F. Cabral	Won		All Others	114	0.94%
14th Bristol	Republican	Elizabeth A. Poirier	Won	Republican	Elizabeth A. Poirier	13,865	70.44%
14th Bristol	Republican	Elizabeth A. Poirier	Won	Independent	Scott P. Dubuc	5,805	29.49%
14th Bristol	Republican	Elizabeth A. Poirier	Won		All Others	14	0.07%
1st Essex	Republican	James M. Kelcourse	Won	Republican	James M. Kelcourse	13,272	54.04%
1st Essex	Republican	James M. Kelcourse	Won	Democratic	Brianna Sullivan	11,280	45.93%
1st Essex	Republican	James M. Kelcourse	Won		All Others	7	0.03%
2nd Essex	Republican	Leonard Mirra	Won	Republican	Leonard Mirra	19,363	98.96%
2nd Essex	Republican	Leonard Mirra	Won		All Others	204	1.04%
3rd Essex	Democratic	Brian S. Dempsey	Won	Democratic	Brian S. Dempsey	15,136	98.65%
3rd Essex	Democratic	Brian S. Dempsey	Won		All Others	207	1.35%
4th Essex	Republican	Bradford R. Hill	Won	Republican	Bradford R. Hill	21,813	99.56%
4th Essex	Republican	Bradford R. Hill	Won		All Others	97	0.44%
5th Essex	Democratic	Ann-Margaret Ferrante	Won	Democratic	Ann-Margaret Ferrante	18,239	98.55%
5th Essex	Democratic	Ann-Margaret Ferrante	Won		All Others	269	1.45%
6th Essex	Democratic	Jerald A. Parisella	Won	Democratic	Jerald A. Parisella	15,012	74.80%
6th Essex	Democratic	Jerald A. Parisella	Won	United Independent	Daniel Fishman	5,045	25.14%
6th Essex	Democratic	Jerald A. Parisella	Won		All Others	12	0.06%
7th Essex	Democratic	Paul F. Tucker	Won	Democratic	Paul F. Tucker	18,208	99.65%
7th Essex	Democratic	Paul F. Tucker	Won		All Others	64	0.35%
8th Essex	Democratic	Lori A. Ehrlich	Won	Democratic	Lori A. Ehrlich	18,365	99.29%
8th Essex	Democratic	Lori A. Ehrlich	Won		All Others	131	0.71%
9th Essex	Republican	Donald H. Wong	Won	Republican	Donald H. Wong	12,816	54.52%
9th Essex	Republican	Donald H. Wong	Won	Democratic	Jennifer Migliore	10,513	44.72%
9th Essex	Republican	Donald H. Wong	Won		All Others	178	0.76%
10th Essex	Democratic	Daniel H. Cahill	Won	Democratic	Daniel H. Cahill	11,556	98.42%
10th Essex	Democratic	Daniel H. Cahill	Won		All Others	186	1.58%
11th Essex	Democratic	Brendan P. Crighton	Won	Democratic	Brendan P. Crighton	11,223	98.23%
11th Essex	Democratic	Brendan P. Crighton	Won		All Others	202	1.77%
12th Essex	Democratic	Thomas P. Walsh	Won	Democratic	Thomas P. Walsh	16,480	98.56%
12th Essex	Democratic	Thomas P. Walsh	Won		All Others	241	1.44%
13th Essex	Democratic	Theodore C. Speliotis	Won	Democratic	Theodore C. Speliotis	18,163	98.05%
13th Essex	Democratic	Theodore C. Speliotis	Won		All Others	361	1.95%
14th Essex	Democratic	Diana DiZoglio	Won	Democratic	Diana DiZoglio	15,927	99.22%
14th Essex	Democratic	Diana DiZoglio	Won		All Others	126	0.78%
15th Essex	Democratic	Linda Dean Campbell	Won	Democratic	Linda Dean Campbell	12,904	63.32%
15th Essex	Democratic	Linda Dean Campbell	Won	Independent	Nicholas S. Torresi	7,421	36.42%
15th Essex	Democratic	Linda Dean Campbell	Won		All Others	53	0.26%
16th Essex	Democratic	Marcos Devers	Defeated in primary	Democratic	Juana B. Matias	11,205	98.07%
16th Essex	Democratic	Marcos Devers	Defeated in primary		All Others	220	1.93%
17th Essex	Democratic	Frank A. Moran	Won	Democratic	Frank A. Moran	12,033	98.69%
17th Essex	Democratic	Frank A. Moran	Won		All Others	160	1.31%
18th Essex	Republican	James J. Lyons Jr.	Won	Republican	James J. Lyons Jr.	14,218	59.57%
18th Essex	Republican	James J. Lyons Jr.	Won	Democratic	Oscar Camargo	9,615	40.28%
18th Essex	Republican	James J. Lyons Jr.	Won		All Others	36	0.15%
1st Franklin	Democratic	Stephen Kulik	Won	Democratic	Stephen Kulik	20,798	99.76%
1st Franklin	Democratic	Stephen Kulik	Won		All Others	51	0.24%
2nd Franklin	Republican	Susannah Whipps Lee	Won	Republican	Susannah Whipps Lee	15,490	98.73%
2nd Franklin	Republican	Susannah Whipps Lee	Won		All Others	200	1.27%
1st Hampden	Republican	Todd M. Smola	Won	Republican	Todd M. Smola	17,633	99.29%
1st Hampden	Republican	Todd M. Smola	Won		All Others	126	0.71%
2nd Hampden	Democratic	Brian M. Ashe	Won	Democratic	Brian M. Ashe	18,058	98.69%
2nd Hampden	Democratic	Brian M. Ashe	Won		All Others	239	1.31%
3rd Hampden	Republican	Nicholas A. Boldyga	Won	Republican	Nicholas A. Boldyga	12,136	59.95%
3rd Hampden	Republican	Nicholas A. Boldyga	Won	Democratic	Rosemary Sandlin	8,089	39.96%
3rd Hampden	Republican	Nicholas A. Boldyga	Won		All Others	20	0.10%
4th Hampden	Democratic	John C. Velis	Won	Democratic	John C. Velis	15,399	99.39%
4th Hampden	Democratic	John C. Velis	Won		All Others	95	0.61%
5th Hampden	Democratic	Aaron Vega	Won	Democratic	Aaron Vega	13,687	99.71%
5th Hampden	Democratic	Aaron Vega	Won		All Others	40	0.29%
6th Hampden	Democratic	Michael J. Finn	Won	Democratic	Michael J. Finn	12,819	98.89%
6th Hampden	Democratic	Michael J. Finn	Won		All Others	144	1.11%
7th Hampden	Democratic	Thomas M. Petrolati	Won	Democratic	Thomas M. Petrolati	16,180	98.59%
7th Hampden	Democratic	Thomas M. Petrolati	Won		All Others	231	1.41%
8th Hampden	Democratic	Joseph F. Wagner	Won	Democratic	Joseph F. Wagner	14,479	98.12%
8th Hampden	Democratic	Joseph F. Wagner	Won		All Others	278	1.88%
9th Hampden	Democratic	Jose F. Tosado	Won	Democratic	Jose F. Tosado	12,020	80.27%
9th Hampden	Democratic	Jose F. Tosado	Won	Independent	Robert J. Underwood	2,885	19.27%
9th Hampden	Democratic	Jose F. Tosado	Won		All Others	69	0.46%
10th Hampden	Democratic	Carlos Gonzalez	Won	Democratic	Carlos Gonzalez	10,286	98.42%
10th Hampden	Democratic	Carlos Gonzalez	Won		All Others	165	1.58%
11th Hampden	Democratic	Benjamin Swan, Sr.	Retired	Democratic	Bud Williams	11,634	97.49%
11th Hampden	Democratic	Benjamin Swan, Sr.	Retired		All Others	299	2.51%
12th Hampden	Democratic	Angelo J. Puppolo Jr.	Won	Democratic	Angelo J. Puppolo Jr.	16,368	98.99%
12th Hampden	Democratic	Angelo J. Puppolo Jr.	Won		All Others	167	1.01%
1st Hampshire	Democratic	Peter V. Kocot	Won	Democratic	Peter V. Kocot	20,145	99.56%
1st Hampshire	Democratic	Peter V. Kocot	Won		All Others	89	0.44%
2nd Hampshire	Democratic	John W. Scibak	Won	Democratic	John W. Scibak	19,023	99.28%
2nd Hampshire	Democratic	John W. Scibak	Won		All Others	138	0.72%
3rd Hampshire	Democratic	Ellen Story	Retired	Democratic	Solomon Israel Goldstein-Rose	14,601	98.74%
3rd Hampshire	Democratic	Ellen Story	Retired		All Others	186	1.26%
1st Middlesex	Republican	Sheila C. Harrington	Won	Republican	Sheila C. Harrington	14,984	65.14%
1st Middlesex	Republican	Sheila C. Harrington	Won	Democratic	Matthew T. Meneghini	8,003	34.79%
1st Middlesex	Republican	Sheila C. Harrington	Won		All Others	15	0.07%
2nd Middlesex	Democratic	James Arciero	Won	Democratic	James Arciero	20,337	99.32%
2nd Middlesex	Democratic	James Arciero	Won		All Others	139	0.68%
3rd Middlesex	Democratic	Kate Hogan	Won	Democratic	Kate Hogan	19,161	98.75%
3rd Middlesex	Democratic	Kate Hogan	Won		All Others	242	1.25%
4th Middlesex	Democratic	Danielle W. Gregoire	Won	Democratic	Danielle W. Gregoire	11,531	59.56%
4th Middlesex	Democratic	Danielle W. Gregoire	Won	Republican	Paul R. Ferro	7,801	40.30%
4th Middlesex	Democratic	Danielle W. Gregoire	Won		All Others	27	0.14%
5th Middlesex	Democratic	David Paul Linsky	Won	Democratic	David Paul Linsky	19,566	99.14%
5th Middlesex	Democratic	David Paul Linsky	Won		All Others	170	0.86%
6th Middlesex	Democratic	Chris Walsh	Won	Democratic	Chris Walsh	16,009	98.46%
6th Middlesex	Democratic	Chris Walsh	Won		All Others	250	1.54%
7th Middlesex	Democratic	Tom Sannicandro	Retired	Democratic	Jack Patrick Lewis	9,286	61.78%
7th Middlesex	Democratic	Tom Sannicandro	Retired	Republican	Yolanda Greaves	4,982	33.14%
7th Middlesex	Democratic	Tom Sannicandro	Retired	Independent	Clifford c. T. Wilson	740	4.92%
7th Middlesex	Democratic	Tom Sannicandro	Retired		All Others	23	0.15%
8th Middlesex	Democratic	Carolyn C. Dykema	Won	Democratic	Carolyn C. Dykema	19,524	98.54%
8th Middlesex	Democratic	Carolyn C. Dykema	Won		All Others	289	1.46%
9th Middlesex	Democratic	Thomas M. Stanley	Won	Democratic	Thomas M. Stanley	12,654	63.32%
9th Middlesex	Democratic	Thomas M. Stanley	Won	Independent	Stacey Gallagher M. Tully	7,164	35.85%
9th Middlesex	Democratic	Thomas M. Stanley	Won		All Others	165	0.83%
10th Middlesex	Democratic	John J. Lawn Jr.	Won	Democratic	John J. Lawn Jr.	12,665	98.51%
10th Middlesex	Democratic	John J. Lawn Jr.	Won		All Others	192	1.49%
11th Middlesex	Democratic	Kay S. Khan	Won	Democratic	Kay S. Khan	17,153	98.72%
11th Middlesex	Democratic	Kay S. Khan	Won		All Others	222	1.28%
12th Middlesex	Democratic	Ruth B. Balser	Won	Democratic	Ruth B. Balser	16,582	98.60%
12th Middlesex	Democratic	Ruth B. Balser	Won		All Others	235	1.40%
13th Middlesex	Democratic	Carmine Lawrence Gentile	Won	Democratic	Carmine Lawrence Gentile	17,561	98.65%
13th Middlesex	Democratic	Carmine Lawrence Gentile	Won		All Others	240	1.35%
14th Middlesex	Democratic	Cory Atkins	Won	Democratic	Cory Atkins	14,831	60.22%
14th Middlesex	Democratic	Cory Atkins	Won	Republican	Helen Brady	8,950	36.34%
14th Middlesex	Democratic	Cory Atkins	Won	Green-Rainbow	Daniel L. Factor	824	3.35%
14th Middlesex	Democratic	Cory Atkins	Won		All Others	22	0.09%
15th Middlesex	Democratic	Jay R. Kaufman	Won	Democratic	Jay R. Kaufman	17,736	99.95%
15th Middlesex	Democratic	Jay R. Kaufman	Won		All Others	8	0.05%
16th Middlesex	Democratic	Thomas A. Golden Jr.	Won	Democratic	Thomas A. Golden Jr.	13,962	98.36%
16th Middlesex	Democratic	Thomas A. Golden Jr.	Won		All Others	233	1.64%
17th Middlesex	Democratic	David M. Nangle	Won	Democratic	David M. Nangle	12,305	97.49%
17th Middlesex	Democratic	David M. Nangle	Won		All Others	317	2.51%
18th Middlesex	Democratic	Rady Mom	Won	Democratic	Rady Mom	8,107	71.75%
18th Middlesex	Democratic	Rady Mom	Won	Republican	Kamara Kay	3,115	27.57%
18th Middlesex	Democratic	Rady Mom	Won		All Others	77	0.68%
19th Middlesex	Democratic	Jim Miceli	Won	Democratic	Jim Miceli	19,349	98.73%
19th Middlesex	Democratic	Jim Miceli	Won		All Others	248	1.27%
20th Middlesex	Republican	Bradley H. Jones Jr.	Won	Republican	Bradley H. Jones Jr.	19,756	99.46%
20th Middlesex	Republican	Bradley H. Jones Jr.	Won		All Others	107	0.54%
21st Middlesex	Democratic	Kenneth I. Gordon	Won	Democratic	Kenneth I. Gordon	13,476	58.53%
21st Middlesex	Democratic	Kenneth I. Gordon	Won	Republican	Paul Girouard Jr.	9,526	41.37%
21st Middlesex	Democratic	Kenneth I. Gordon	Won		All Others	24	0.10%
22nd Middlesex	Republican	Marc T. Lombardo	Won	Republican	Marc T. Lombardo	12,583	58.95%
22nd Middlesex	Republican	Marc T. Lombardo	Won	Democratic	George Simolaris Jr.	8,671	40.62%
22nd Middlesex	Republican	Marc T. Lombardo	Won		All Others	92	0.43%
23rd Middlesex	Democratic	Sean Garballey	Won	Democratic	Sean Garballey	20,991	99.22%
23rd Middlesex	Democratic	Sean Garballey	Won		All Others	165	0.78%
24th Middlesex	Democratic	David M. Rogers	Won	Democratic	David M. Rogers	18,570	99.08%
24th Middlesex	Democratic	David M. Rogers	Won		All Others	172	0.92%
25th Middlesex	Democratic	Marjorie C. Decker	Won	Democratic	Marjorie C. Decker	15,968	99.16%
25th Middlesex	Democratic	Marjorie C. Decker	Won		All Others	135	0.84%
26th Middlesex	Democratic	Timothy Toomey Jr.	Defeated in primary	Democratic	Mike Connolly	15,872	98.42%
26th Middlesex	Democratic	Timothy Toomey Jr.	Defeated in primary		All Others	255	1.58%
27th Middlesex	Democratic	Denise Provost	Won	Democratic	Denise Provost	18,409	86.99%
27th Middlesex	Democratic	Denise Provost	Won	Pirate	Aaron James	2,680	12.66%
27th Middlesex	Democratic	Denise Provost	Won		All Others	74	0.35%
28th Middlesex	Democratic	Joseph W. McGonagle Jr.	Won	Democratic	Joseph W. McGonagle Jr.	10,811	98.53%
28th Middlesex	Democratic	Joseph W. McGonagle Jr.	Won		All Others	161	1.47%
29th Middlesex	Democratic	Jonathan Hecht	Won	Democratic	Jonathan Hecht	18,821	98.65%
29th Middlesex	Democratic	Jonathan Hecht	Won		All Others	258	1.35%
30th Middlesex	Democratic	James J. Dwyer	Won	Democratic	James J. Dwyer	15,943	99.55%
30th Middlesex	Democratic	James J. Dwyer	Won		All Others	72	0.45%
31st Middlesex	Democratic	Michael Seamus Day	Won	Democratic	Michael Seamus Day	14,528	58.82%
31st Middlesex	Democratic	Michael Seamus Day	Won	Republican	Caroline Colarusso	10,163	41.15%
31st Middlesex	Democratic	Michael Seamus Day	Won		All Others	9	0.04%
32nd Middlesex	Democratic	Paul A. Brodeur	Won	Democratic	Paul A. Brodeur	18,386	98.68%
32nd Middlesex	Democratic	Paul A. Brodeur	Won		All Others	246	1.32%
33rd Middlesex	Democratic	Steven Ultrino	Won	Democratic	Steven Ultrino	11,435	98.45%
33rd Middlesex	Democratic	Steven Ultrino	Won		All Others	180	1.55%
34th Middlesex	Democratic	Christine P. Barber	Won	Democratic	Christine P. Barber	16,334	98.59%
34th Middlesex	Democratic	Christine P. Barber	Won		All Others	233	1.41%
35th Middlesex	Democratic	Paul J. Donato, Sr.	Won	Democratic	Paul J. Donato, Sr.	15,306	98.48%
35th Middlesex	Democratic	Paul J. Donato, Sr.	Won		All Others	237	1.52%
36th Middlesex	Democratic	Colleen M. Garry	Won	Democratic	Colleen M. Garry	18,003	99.83%
36th Middlesex	Democratic	Colleen M. Garry	Won		All Others	31	0.17%
37th Middlesex	Democratic	Jennifer E. Benson	Won	Democratic	Jennifer E. Benson	17,814	99.00%
37th Middlesex	Democratic	Jennifer E. Benson	Won		All Others	180	1.00%
1st Norfolk	Democratic	Bruce J. Ayers	Won	Democratic	Bruce J. Ayers	15,497	99.83%
1st Norfolk	Democratic	Bruce J. Ayers	Won		All Others	27	0.17%
2nd Norfolk	Democratic	Tackey Chan	Won	Democratic	Tackey Chan	15,005	100.00%
3rd Norfolk	Democratic	Ronald Mariano	Won	Democratic	Ronald Mariano	15,810	99.19%
3rd Norfolk	Democratic	Ronald Mariano	Won		All Others	129	0.81%
4th Norfolk	Democratic	James Michael Murphy	Won	Democratic	James Michael Murphy	17,771	98.67%
4th Norfolk	Democratic	James Michael Murphy	Won		All Others	240	1.33%
5th Norfolk	Democratic	Mark J. Cusack	Won	Democratic	Mark J. Cusack	16,652	98.54%
5th Norfolk	Democratic	Mark J. Cusack	Won		All Others	246	1.46%
6th Norfolk	Democratic	William C. Galvin	Won	Democratic	William C. Galvin	17,215	99.61%
6th Norfolk	Democratic	William C. Galvin	Won		All Others	68	0.39%
7th Norfolk	Democratic	Walter Timilty	Retired	Democratic	William J. Driscoll Jr.	16,318	99.22%
7th Norfolk	Democratic	Walter Timilty	Retired		All Others	128	0.78%
8th Norfolk	Democratic	Louis L. Kafka	Won	Democratic	Louis L. Kafka	18,169	99.17%
8th Norfolk	Democratic	Louis L. Kafka	Won		All Others	152	0.83%
9th Norfolk	Republican	Shawn C. Dooley	Won	Republican	Shawn C. Dooley	14,427	60.86%
9th Norfolk	Republican	Shawn C. Dooley	Won	Democratic	Brian P. Hamlin	9,267	39.09%
9th Norfolk	Republican	Shawn C. Dooley	Won		All Others	13	0.05%
10th Norfolk	Democratic	Jeffrey N. Roy	Won	Democratic	Jeffrey N. Roy	18,581	98.16%
10th Norfolk	Democratic	Jeffrey N. Roy	Won		All Others	349	1.84%
11th Norfolk	Democratic	Paul McMurtry	Won	Democratic	Paul McMurtry	18,918	99.20%
11th Norfolk	Democratic	Paul McMurtry	Won		All Others	153	0.80%
12th Norfolk	Democratic	John H. Rogers	Won	Democratic	John H. Rogers	14,534	65.92%
12th Norfolk	Democratic	John H. Rogers	Won	Republican	Tim Hempton	7,486	33.95%
12th Norfolk	Democratic	John H. Rogers	Won		All Others	27	0.12%
13th Norfolk	Democratic	Denise C. Garlick	Won	Democratic	Denise C. Garlick	20,144	98.66%
13th Norfolk	Democratic	Denise C. Garlick	Won		All Others	273	1.34%
14th Norfolk	Democratic	Alice Hanlon Peisch	Won	Democratic	Alice Hanlon Peisch	17,759	99.38%
14th Norfolk	Democratic	Alice Hanlon Peisch	Won		All Others	110	0.62%
15th Norfolk	Democratic	Frank Israel Smizik	Won	Democratic	Frank Israel Smizik	16,079	99.51%
15th Norfolk	Democratic	Frank Israel Smizik	Won		All Others	79	0.49%
1st Plymouth	Republican	Mathew J. Muratore	Won	Republican	Mathew J. Muratore	11,873	50.84%
1st Plymouth	Republican	Mathew J. Muratore	Won	Democratic	John T. Mahoney Jr.	11,471	49.12%
1st Plymouth	Republican	Mathew J. Muratore	Won		All Others	8	0.03%
2nd Plymouth	Republican	Susan Williams Gifford	Won	Republican	Susan Williams Gifford	11,894	57.71%
2nd Plymouth	Republican	Susan Williams Gifford	Won	Democratic	Sarah G. Hewins	8,692	42.18%
2nd Plymouth	Republican	Susan Williams Gifford	Won		All Others	23	0.11%
3rd Plymouth	Democratic	Garrett Bradley	Retired	Democratic	Joan Meschino	13,257	53.97%
3rd Plymouth	Democratic	Garrett Bradley	Retired	Republican	Kristen G. Arute	11,285	45.94%
3rd Plymouth	Democratic	Garrett Bradley	Retired		All Others	23	0.09%
4th Plymouth	Democratic	James M. Cantwell	Won	Democratic	James M. Cantwell	17,388	69.55%
4th Plymouth	Democratic	James M. Cantwell	Won	Republican	Michael White	7,601	30.41%
4th Plymouth	Democratic	James M. Cantwell	Won		All Others	10	0.04%
5th Plymouth	Republican	David F. Decoste	Won	Republican	David F. Decoste	12,293	51.01%
5th Plymouth	Republican	David F. Decoste	Won	Democratic	Kara L. Nyman	11,790	48.92%
5th Plymouth	Republican	David F. Decoste	Won		All Others	17	0.07%
6th Plymouth	Democratic	Josh S. Cutler	Won	Democratic	Josh S. Cutler	15,290	64.01%
6th Plymouth	Democratic	Josh S. Cutler	Won	Republican	Vince Cogliano	8,582	35.93%
6th Plymouth	Democratic	Josh S. Cutler	Won		All Others	14	0.06%
7th Plymouth	Republican	Geoff Diehl	Won	Republican	Geoff Diehl	17,088	99.16%
7th Plymouth	Republican	Geoff Diehl	Won		All Others	144	0.84%
8th Plymouth	Republican	Angelo L. D'Emilia	Won	Republican	Angelo L. D'Emilia	14,963	98.38%
8th Plymouth	Republican	Angelo L. D'Emilia	Won		All Others	247	1.62%
9th Plymouth	Democratic	Gerard J. Cassidy	Won	Democratic	Gerard J. Cassidy	10,346	85.55%
9th Plymouth	Democratic	Gerard J. Cassidy	Won	Republican	Danny J. Yoon	1,745	14.43%
9th Plymouth	Democratic	Gerard J. Cassidy	Won		All Others	2	0.02%
10th Plymouth	Democratic	Michelle M. Dubois	Won	Democratic	Michelle M. Dubois	13,945	99.19%
10th Plymouth	Democratic	Michelle M. Dubois	Won		All Others	114	0.81%
11th Plymouth	Democratic	Claire D. Cronin	Won	Democratic	Claire D. Cronin	15,361	99.79%
11th Plymouth	Democratic	Claire D. Cronin	Won		All Others	33	0.21%
12th Plymouth	Democratic	Thomas J. Calter, III	Won	Democratic	Thomas J. Calter, III	13,908	59.87%
12th Plymouth	Democratic	Thomas J. Calter, III	Won	Republican	Peter J. Boncek	9,297	40.02%
12th Plymouth	Democratic	Thomas J. Calter, III	Won		All Others	26	0.11%
1st Suffolk	Democratic	Adrian C. Madaro	Won	Democratic	Adrian C. Madaro	9,946	97.98%
1st Suffolk	Democratic	Adrian C. Madaro	Won		All Others	205	2.02%
2nd Suffolk	Democratic	Daniel Joseph Ryan	Won	Democratic	Daniel Joseph Ryan	12,755	99.08%
2nd Suffolk	Democratic	Daniel Joseph Ryan	Won		All Others	118	0.92%
3rd Suffolk	Democratic	Aaron M. Michlewitz	Won	Democratic	Aaron M. Michlewitz	15,542	98.74%
3rd Suffolk	Democratic	Aaron M. Michlewitz	Won		All Others	199	1.26%
4th Suffolk	Democratic	Nick Collins	Won	Democratic	Nick Collins	18,781	98.61%
4th Suffolk	Democratic	Nick Collins	Won		All Others	264	1.39%
5th Suffolk	Democratic	Evandro C. Carvalho	Won	Democratic	Evandro C. Carvalho	10,855	83.89%
5th Suffolk	Democratic	Evandro C. Carvalho	Won	Republican	Althea Garrison	2,014	15.57%
5th Suffolk	Democratic	Evandro C. Carvalho	Won		All Others	70	0.54%
6th Suffolk	Democratic	Russell E. Holmes	Won	Democratic	Russell E. Holmes	13,044	98.79%
6th Suffolk	Democratic	Russell E. Holmes	Won		All Others	160	1.21%
7th Suffolk	Democratic	Gloria Fox	Retired	Democratic	Chynah Tyler	9,150	98.58%
7th Suffolk	Democratic	Gloria Fox	Retired		All Others	132	1.42%
8th Suffolk	Democratic	Jay D. Livingstone	Won	Democratic	Jay D. Livingstone	16,201	98.73%
8th Suffolk	Democratic	Jay D. Livingstone	Won		All Others	209	1.27%
9th Suffolk	Democratic	Byron Rushing	Won	Democratic	Byron Rushing	12,617	98.52%
9th Suffolk	Democratic	Byron Rushing	Won		All Others	190	1.48%
10th Suffolk	Democratic	Edward F. Coppinger	Won	Democratic	Edward F. Coppinger	17,070	98.82%
10th Suffolk	Democratic	Edward F. Coppinger	Won		All Others	203	1.18%
11th Suffolk	Democratic	Elizabeth A. Malia	Won	Democratic	Elizabeth A. Malia	15,628	88.94%
11th Suffolk	Democratic	Elizabeth A. Malia	Won	Independent	Stephen Charles Bedell	1,884	10.72%
11th Suffolk	Democratic	Elizabeth A. Malia	Won		All Others	60	0.34%
12th Suffolk	Democratic	Dan Cullinane	Won	Democratic	Dan Cullinane	15,286	98.63%
12th Suffolk	Democratic	Dan Cullinane	Won		All Others	213	1.37%
13th Suffolk	Democratic	Daniel J. Hunt	Won	Democratic	Daniel J. Hunt	14,507	98.43%
13th Suffolk	Democratic	Daniel J. Hunt	Won		All Others	232	1.57%
14th Suffolk	Democratic	Angelo M. Scaccia	Won	Democratic	Angelo M. Scaccia	15,784	98.39%
14th Suffolk	Democratic	Angelo M. Scaccia	Won		All Others	259	1.61%
15th Suffolk	Democratic	Jeffrey Sanchez	Won	Democratic	Jeffrey Sanchez	15,675	98.87%
15th Suffolk	Democratic	Jeffrey Sanchez	Won		All Others	179	1.13%
16th Suffolk	Democratic	Roselee Vincent	Won	Democratic	Roselee Vincent	11,220	98.58%
16th Suffolk	Democratic	Roselee Vincent	Won		All Others	162	1.42%
17th Suffolk	Democratic	Kevin G. Honan	Won	Democratic	Kevin G. Honan	13,367	98.65%
17th Suffolk	Democratic	Kevin G. Honan	Won		All Others	183	1.35%
18th Suffolk	Democratic	Michael J. Moran	Won	Democratic	Michael J. Moran	10,714	98.58%
18th Suffolk	Democratic	Michael J. Moran	Won		All Others	154	1.42%
19th Suffolk	Democratic	Robert A. DeLeo	Won	Democratic	Robert A. DeLeo	13,000	98.18%
19th Suffolk	Democratic	Robert A. DeLeo	Won		All Others	241	1.82%
1st Worcester	Republican	Kimberly N. Ferguson	Won	Republican	Kimberly N. Ferguson	20,065	99.29%
1st Worcester	Republican	Kimberly N. Ferguson	Won		All Others	144	0.71%
2nd Worcester	Democratic	Jonathan D. Zlotnik	Won	Democratic	Jonathan D. Zlotnik	14,470	98.96%
2nd Worcester	Democratic	Jonathan D. Zlotnik	Won		All Others	152	1.04%
3rd Worcester	Democratic	Stephan Hay	Won	Democratic	Stephan Hay	13,498	99.48%
3rd Worcester	Democratic	Stephan Hay	Won		All Others	70	0.52%
4th Worcester	Democratic	Dennis Rosa	Retired	Democratic	Natalie Higgins	10,382	55.05%
4th Worcester	Democratic	Dennis Rosa	Retired	Republican	Thomas F. Ardinger	8,426	44.68%
4th Worcester	Democratic	Dennis Rosa	Retired		All Others	51	0.27%
5th Worcester	Republican	Donald R. Berthiaume Jr.	Won	Republican	Donald R. Berthiaume Jr.	17,133	99.47%
5th Worcester	Republican	Donald R. Berthiaume Jr.	Won		All Others	91	0.53%
6th Worcester	Republican	Peter J. Durant	Won	Republican	Peter J. Durant	15,106	98.53%
6th Worcester	Republican	Peter J. Durant	Won		All Others	225	1.47%
7th Worcester	Republican	Paul K. Frost	Won	Republican	Paul K. Frost	13,691	66.26%
7th Worcester	Republican	Paul K. Frost	Won	Democratic	Terry Burke Dotson	6,951	33.64%
7th Worcester	Republican	Paul K. Frost	Won		All Others	19	0.09%
8th Worcester	Republican	Kevin J. Kuros	Won	Republican	Kevin J. Kuros	17,436	98.85%
8th Worcester	Republican	Kevin J. Kuros	Won		All Others	203	1.15%
9th Worcester	Republican	David K. Muradian Jr.	Won	Republican	David K. Muradian Jr.	18,513	99.58%
9th Worcester	Republican	David K. Muradian Jr.	Won		All Others	79	0.42%
10th Worcester	Democratic	John Fernandes	Retired	Democratic	Brian W. Murray	11,869	54.94%
10th Worcester	Democratic	John Fernandes	Retired	Republican	Sandra Slattery E. Biagetti	9,708	44.94%
10th Worcester	Democratic	John Fernandes	Retired		All Others	25	0.12%
11th Worcester	Republican	Hannah E. Kane	Won	Republican	Hannah E. Kane	17,835	98.08%
11th Worcester	Republican	Hannah E. Kane	Won		All Others	349	1.92%
12th Worcester	Democratic	Harold P. Naughton Jr.	Won	Democratic	Harold P. Naughton Jr.	15,976	79.84%
12th Worcester	Democratic	Harold P. Naughton Jr.	Won	Green-Rainbow	Charlene R. Dicalogero	3,916	19.57%
12th Worcester	Democratic	Harold P. Naughton Jr.	Won		All Others	119	0.59%
13th Worcester	Democratic	John J. Mahoney Jr.	Won	Democratic	John J. Mahoney Jr.	12,943	97.97%
13th Worcester	Democratic	John J. Mahoney Jr.	Won		All Others	268	2.03%
14th Worcester	Democratic	James J. O'Day	Won	Democratic	James J. O'Day	13,360	98.11%
14th Worcester	Democratic	James J. O'Day	Won		All Others	257	1.89%
15th Worcester	Democratic	Mary S. Keefe	Won	Democratic	Mary S. Keefe	8,039	78.22%
15th Worcester	Democratic	Mary S. Keefe	Won	Independent	Ralph Perez	2,184	21.25%
15th Worcester	Democratic	Mary S. Keefe	Won		All Others	55	0.54%
16th Worcester	Democratic	Daniel M. Donahue	Won	Democratic	Daniel M. Donahue	7,783	66.99%
16th Worcester	Democratic	Daniel M. Donahue	Won	United Independent	John P. Fresolo	3,804	32.74%
16th Worcester	Democratic	Daniel M. Donahue	Won		All Others	32	0.28%
17th Worcester	Republican	Kate D. Campanale	Won	Republican	Kate D. Campanale	8,011	54.45%
17th Worcester	Republican	Kate D. Campanale	Won	Democratic	Moses S. Dixon	6,671	45.34%
17th Worcester	Republican	Kate D. Campanale	Won		All Others	31	0.21%
18th Worcester	Republican	Joseph D. McKenna	Won	Republican	Joseph D. McKenna	16,504	98.99%
18th Worcester	Republican	Joseph D. McKenna	Won		All Others	168	1.01%

Source: Secretary of the Commonwealth of Massachusetts, Ballotpedia
