= Natalie Higgins =

American politician (born 1988)

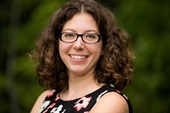

Member of the Massachusetts House of Representatives from the 4th Worcester district
- Incumbent
- Assumed office January 4, 2017
- Preceded by: Dennis Rosa

Personal details
- Born: July 24, 1988 (age 37)
- Party: Democratic
- Education: UMass Amherst (BA); Northeastern University School of Law (JD)

Natalie M. Higgins (born July 24, 1988) is an American politician serving in the Massachusetts House of Representatives. She is a member of the Democratic Party. Natalie is a lifelong Leominster resident, Boston-educated attorney, and former non-profit director and rape crisis counselor.

She is a graduate of Leominster High School, the University of Massachusetts Amherst and the Northeastern University School of Law. As an undergraduate at UMass Amherst, she interned for Jennifer Flanagan, at the time a state representative. She was admitted to the Massachusetts Bar in 2014. She is a member of the LGBT community.

== Political career ==
Natalie Higgins was elected to the Massachusetts House of Representatives in November 2016 and sworn in as State Representative for the 4th Worcester District (Leominster) on January 4, 2017, and reelected in 2018, and 2020. In the 2019 - 2020 Legislative session, Higgins is the Vice-Chair of the House Committee on Personnel & Administration.

=== Leadership and Committees ===
- Vice-Chair, Joint Committee on Public Service
- House Committee on Ways and Means
- Joint Committee on Children, Families, and Persons with Disabilities
- Joint Committee on Mental Health, Substance Use, and Recovery
- Joint Committee on Ways and Means

== See also ==
- 2017–2018 Massachusetts legislature
- 2019–2020 Massachusetts legislature
- 2021–2022 Massachusetts legislature
- 2020 Massachusetts House of Representatives election
