= Maria Robinson =

Korean-American politician (born 1987)

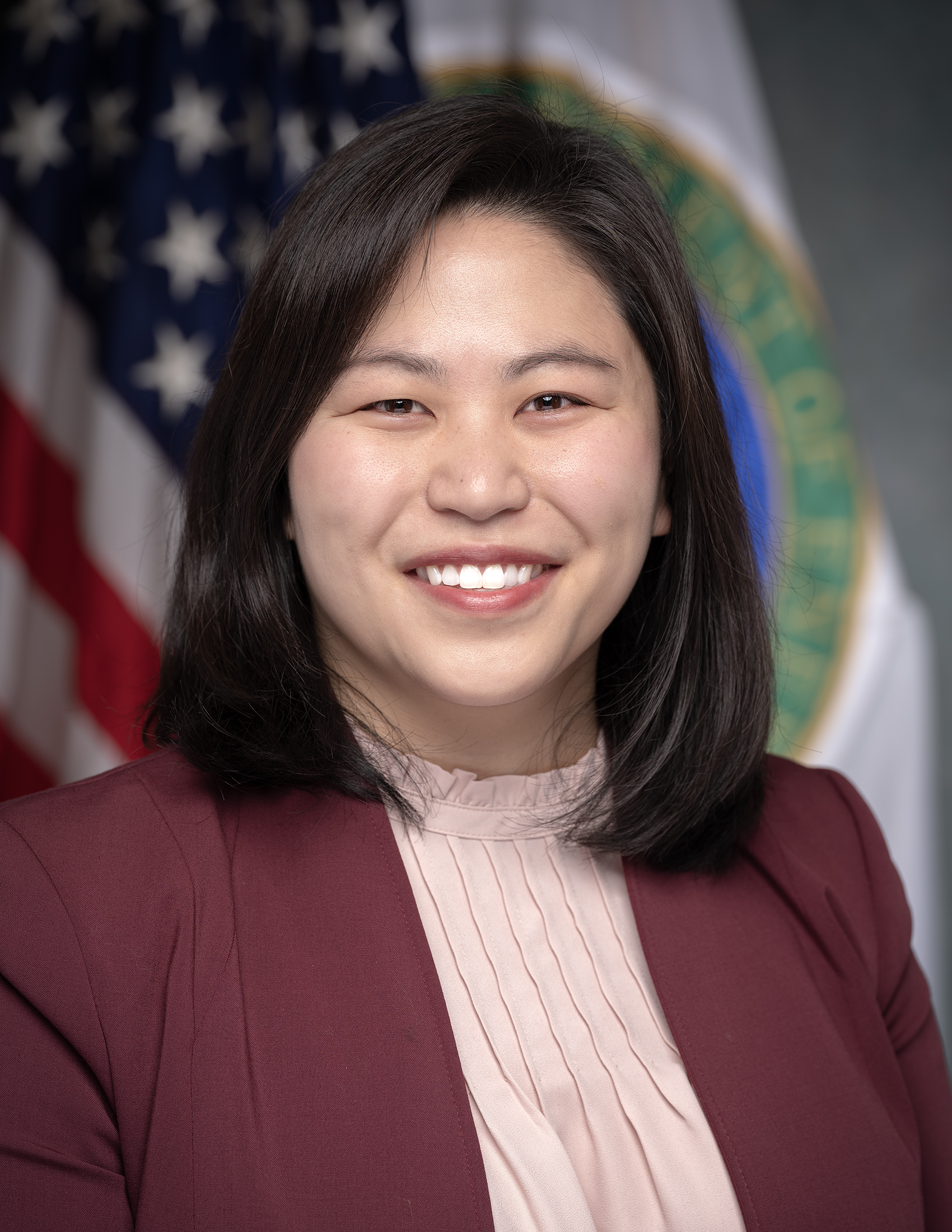
- Official portrait, 2023

Director of the Grid Deployment Office
- In office July 19, 2022 – January 20, 2025
- President: Joe Biden
- Preceded by: Patricia A. Hoffman

Member of the Massachusetts House of Representatives from the 6th Middlesex district
- In office January 2, 2019 – July 19, 2022
- Preceded by: Chris Walsh
- Succeeded by: Priscila Sousa

Personal details
- Born: March 25, 1987 (age 39) South Korea
- Party: Democratic
- Spouse: Matthew Robinson
- Education: Massachusetts Institute of Technology (SB); University of Tulsa (MJEL)

Maria Duaime Robinson is an American politician who served as a member of the Massachusetts House of Representatives for the 6th Middlesex district from 2019 to 2022. In September 2021, she was nominated by President Joe Biden to serve as assistant secretary of energy for electricity delivery and energy reliability, but the White House withdrew her nomination on June 8, 2022. She was then named director of the Department of Energy's Grid Deployment Office, where she remained until 2025.

== Early life and education ==
Born in South Korea, Robinson was adopted by American parents of Irish-German Catholic descent from Pennsylvania. She attended Bishop Hoban High School in Wilkes-Barre, before attending Massachusetts Institute of Technology where she graduated with a Bachelor of Science. She later attended the University of Tulsa, where earned a Master of Studies in Law.

== Career ==
Robinson became a member of the Framingham Democratic Committee and was a member of the Framingham Town Meeting. She became the first Korean-American elected to the Massachusetts General Court. Previously, she led Advanced Energy Economy’s program on wholesale markets, including engagement at Federal Energy Regulatory Commission and the regional transmission organizations. Prior to that, she focused on regulatory issues relating to energy and air, including leading the organization’s state Clean Power Plan campaign, which covered over two dozen states across the country. She managed report development and data-driven analysis at the state and national level. Robinson was employed by Navigant Consulting in the renewable energy and energy efficiency practices, supporting the state of Massachusetts in analyzing and procuring contractors for statewide renewable energy and energy efficiency projects. She interned with the United States Environmental Protection Agency’s office of Water and in the office of Congressman Jay Inslee.

Robinson was the first Korean-American elected to the Massachusetts State Legislature. In 2018, she overwhelmingly defeated the competing write-in candidates with nearly 78% of the votes. Her district lay solely within the city of Framingham, covering eleven of its eighteen precincts. Robinson served on the House Committee on Technology and Intergovernmental Affairs, the Joint Committee on Cannabis Policy, the Joint Committee on Export Development, and the Joint Committee on State Administration and Regulatory Oversight.

She ran for a second term in 2020, and was endorsed by the Massachusetts Women’s Political Caucus. She was reelected, receiving 98.0% of votes cast.

In June 2021, Robinson was reportedly among the candidates vetted by the White House to succeed Neil Chatterjee as a member of the Federal Energy Regulatory Commission. Willie L. Phillips Jr., chair of the District of Columbia Public Service Commission, was ultimately selected.

In September 2021, President Biden announced that he would nominate Robinson to serve as Assistant Secretary of Energy for Electricity Delivery and Energy Reliability. On February 8, 2022, she appeared for a hearing before the United States Senate Committee on Energy and Natural Resources. On May 3, 2022, the committee was deadlocked on whether to advance her nomination to the full Senate. Her nomination was withdrawn by President Biden on June 8, 2022. Robinson was named director of the Grid Deployment Office in the Department of Energy and resigned from the House in July 2022. The position does not require Senate confirmation. Robinson remained in the post until the end of the Biden presidency in 2025. She then became CEO of the Interstate Renewable Energy Council.

== Personal life ==
Robinson and her husband Matthew live in Framingham with their daughter. She is also an award-winning music director in the Greater Boston region and enjoys playing piano for shows.

== See also ==
- 2019–2020 Massachusetts legislature
- 2021–2022 Massachusetts legislature
