= 2020 Massachusetts House of Representatives election =

- November 3, 2020

All 160 seats in the Massachusetts House of Representatives 81 seats needed for a majority
- Registered: 4,812,909
- Turnout: 76.00% (▲15.84%)
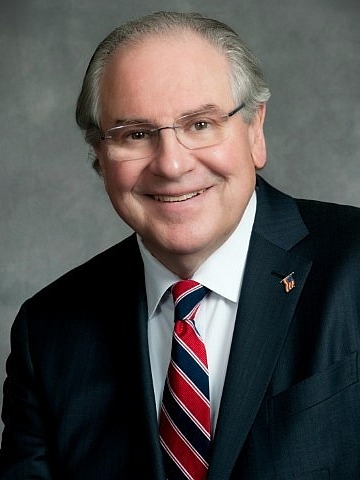

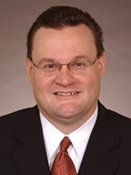

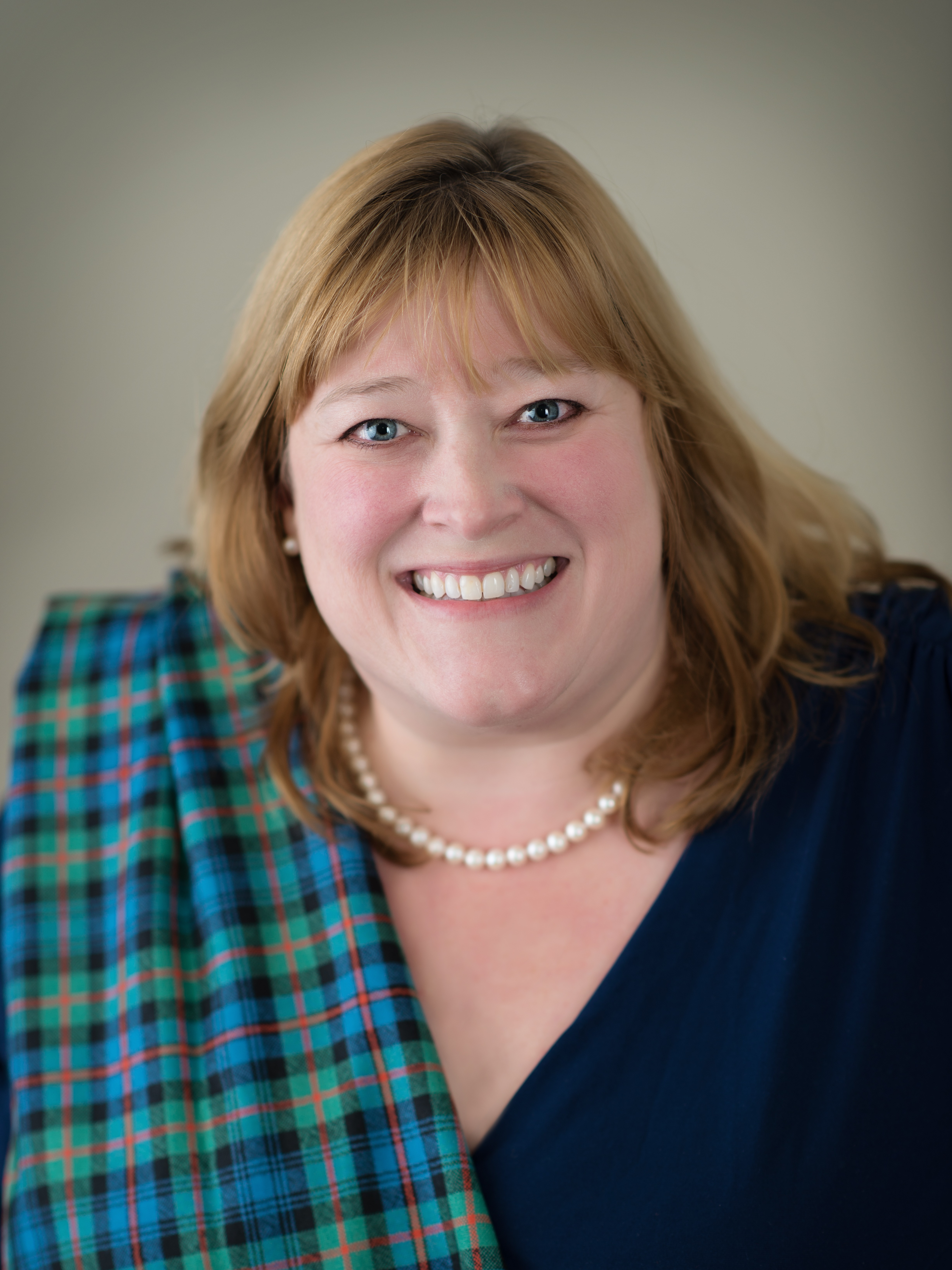
	Majority party	Minority party
Leader	Robert DeLeo	Bradley Jones Jr.
Party	Democratic	Republican
Leader since	January 27, 2009	November 21, 2002
Leader's seat	19th Suffolk	20th Middlesex
Last election	127 seats	32 seats
Seats won	129	30
Seat change	▲2	▼2
Popular vote	2,239,316	686,101
Percentage	74.27%	22.76%
	Third party
Leader	Susannah Whipps
Party	Independent
Leader's seat	2nd Franklin
Last election	1 seat
Seats won	1
Seat change	Steady
Popular vote	56,261
Percentage	1.87%
- Results: Democratic hold Democratic gain Republican hold Republican gain Independent hold
Speaker before election
Robert DeLeo
Democratic
Elected Speaker
Ronald Mariano
Democratic

The 2020 Massachusetts House of Representatives election took place on November 3, 2020. It elected members of the Massachusetts House of Representatives. Democrats achieved a net gain of 2 seats. One independent, Susannah Whipps, was also elected. Incumbent Speaker Robert DeLeo won re-election but resigned before the new session to take a position at Northeastern University; Ronald Mariano replaced him as Speaker.

== Predictions ==
Source	Ranking	As of
The Cook Political Report	Safe D	October 21, 2020

== Overview ==
=== Election ===
2020 Massachusetts House of Representatives election General election — November 3, 2020
Party	Votes	Percentage	Seats	+/–
Democratic	2,239,316	74.27	129	▲2
Republican	686,101	22.76	30	▼2
Green-Rainbow	1,100	0.04	0	Steady
Independents	56,261	1.87	1	Steady
All Others	30,628	1.02	0	Steady
Write-In	1,613	0.05	0	Steady
Valid votes	3,015,019	82.42	—	—
Invalid votes	642,986	17.58	—	—
Totals	3,658,005	100	160	—
Registered voter/turnout	4,812,909	76.00		

Popular vote
Democratic	74.27%
Republican	22.76%
Independent	1.87%
Other	1.10%

Percentage seats won
Democratic	80.63%
Republican	18.75%
Independent	0.62%

=== Closest races ===
Seats where the margin of victory was under 10%:

1. 7th Hampden District, 0.8%
2. 5th Plymouth District, 1.4%
3. 2nd Essex District, 2.6%
4. 1st Middlesex District, 3.1%
5. 1st Essex District, 3.3%
6. 5th Barnstable District, 4.3%
7. 4th Hampden District, 8% (gain)
8. 2nd Barnstable District, 8.3% (gain)
9. 14th Bristol District, 8.9% (gain)
10. 13th Essex District, 9.2%
11. 12th Plymouth District, 9.5%

== See also ==
- 2020 Massachusetts general election
- 2020 Massachusetts Senate election
- 2019–2020 Massachusetts legislature
- 2021–2022 Massachusetts legislature
