= 2021–2022 Massachusetts legislature =

192nd Massachusetts General Court

192nd Massachusetts General Court
←	191st	193rd	→
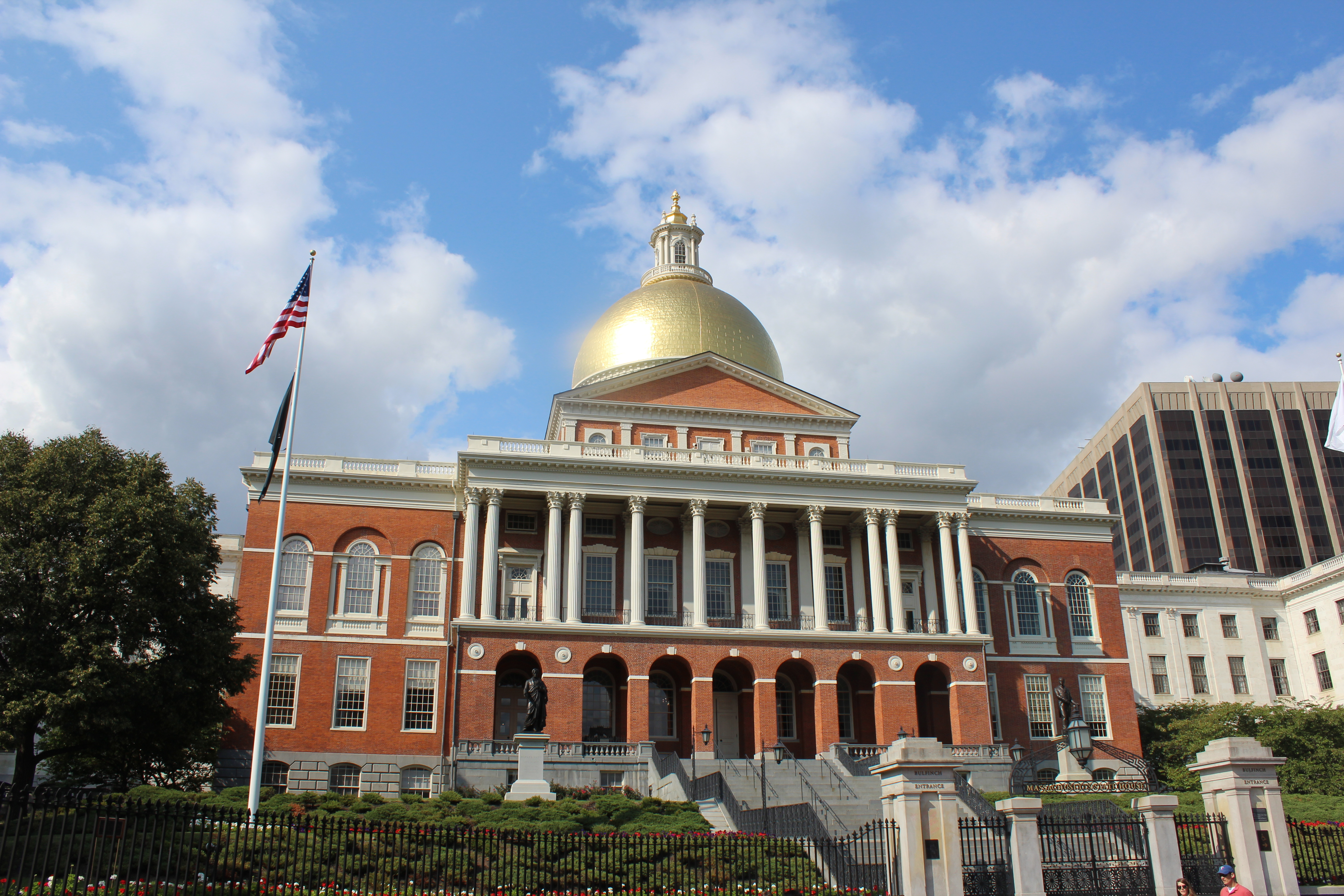
- Massachusetts State House (2017)

Overview
- Legislative body: Massachusetts General Court
- Meeting place: Massachusetts State House
- Term: January 6, 2021 – January 4, 2023
- Election: 2020 election
- Website: malegislature.gov

Senate
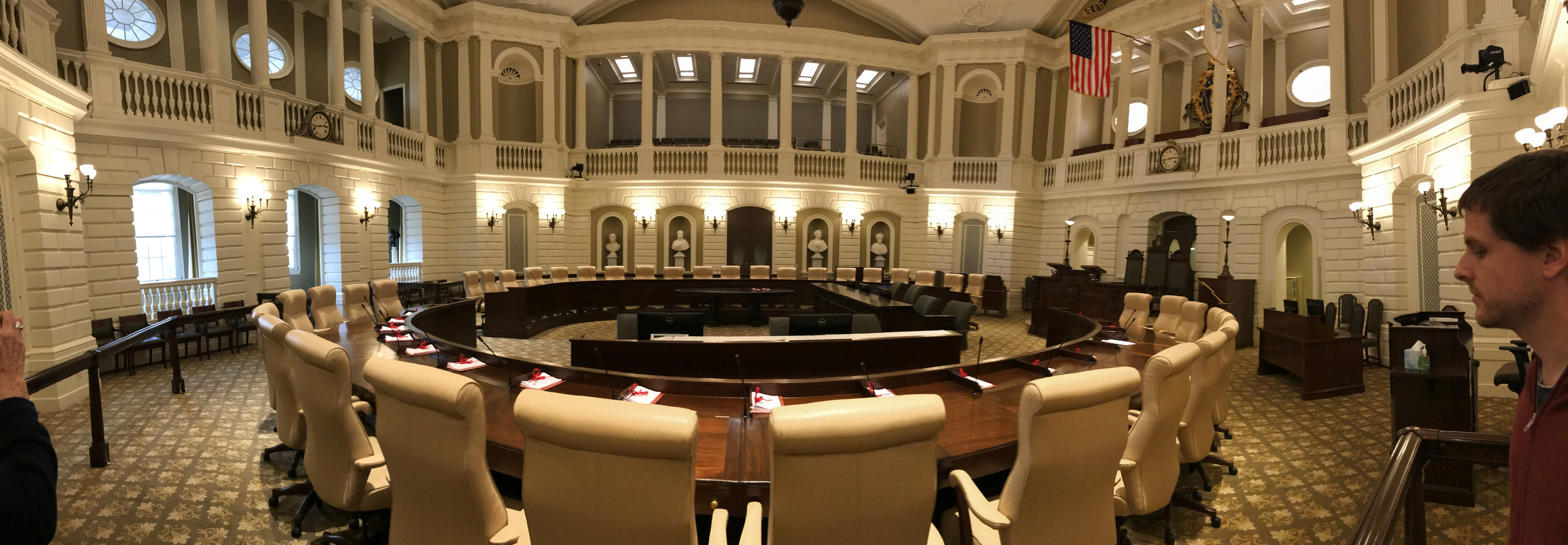
- Members: 40
- President of the Senate: Karen E. Spilka
- Majority Leader: Cynthia Stone Creem
- President Pro Tempore: William N. Brownsberger
- Minority Leader: Bruce E. Tarr
- Party control: Democratic

House of Representatives
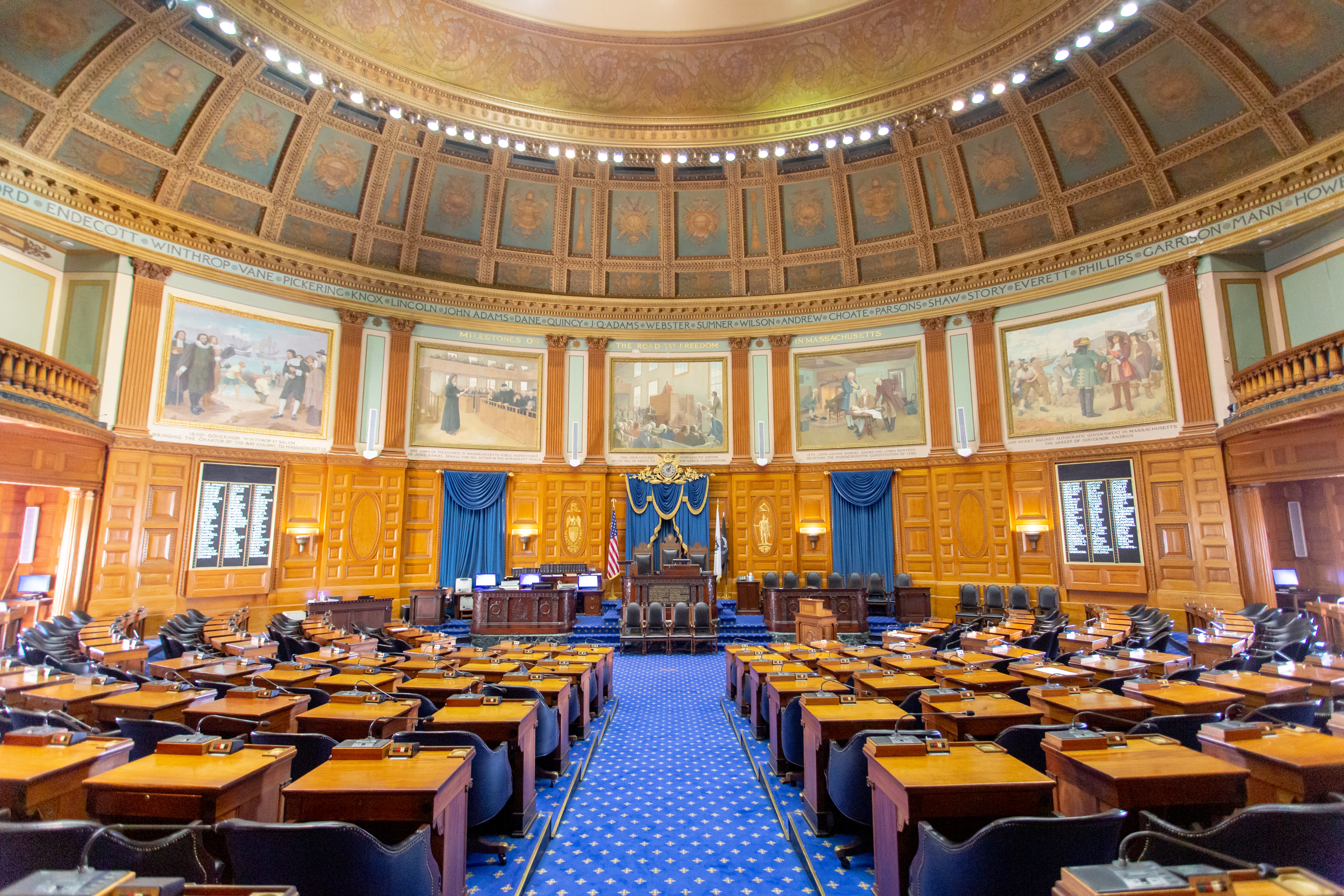
- Members: 160
- Speaker of the House: Ronald Mariano
- Majority Leader: Vacant
- Speaker Pro Tempore: Kate Hogan
- Minority Leader: Bradley H. Jones, Jr.
- Party control: Democratic

Sessions
- 1st: January 6, 2021 – January 5, 2022
- 2nd: January 5, 2022 – January 4, 2023

The 192nd Massachusetts General Court was a meeting of the legislative branch of the state government of Massachusetts. It consisted of elected members of the Senate and House of Representatives. It first convened in Boston at the Massachusetts State House on January 6, 2021, during the governorship of Charlie Baker. The 192nd term ended in early 2023. Will Brownsberger, Michael Moran, and Dan Hunt oversaw decennial redistricting based on the 2020 census.

Also in 2021, legislators debated whether or not to increase public access to information about their own proceedings. (Note: "Massachusetts is the only state where the judicial branch, Legislature, and governor’s office all claim exemptions from public records laws. The state has ranked toward the bottom nationally on measures of openness and transparency.") Other notable discussion topics include progressive taxation, the gig economy, climate change, spending of federal aid, driver's licenses, animal welfare, and civil asset forfeiture.

== Leadership ==
=== Senate ===
Position	Leader	District	Party
President of the Senate	Karen E. Spilka	Second Middlesex and Norfolk	Democratic
Majority Leader	Cynthia Stone Creem	First Middlesex and Norfolk	Democratic
President Pro Tempore	William N. Brownsberger	Second Suffolk and Middlesex	Democratic
Senate President Emerita	Harriette L. Chandler	First Worcester	Democratic
Assistant Majority Leader	Joan Lovely	Second Essex	Democratic
Assistant Majority Leader	Michael J. Barrett	Third Middlesex	Democratic
Assistant Majority Leader	Sal N. DiDomenico	Middlesex and Suffolk	Democratic
Senate Majority Whip	Michael F. Rush	Norfolk and Suffolk	Democratic
Assistant Majority Whip	Julian Cyr	Cape and Islands	Democratic
Senate Ways and Means Chair	Michael J. Rodrigues	First Bristol and Plymouth	Democratic
Minority Leader	Bruce E. Tarr	First Essex and Middlesex	Republican
Assistant Minority Leader	Patrick M. O'Connor	Plymouth and Norfolk	Republican
Assistant Minority Leader	Ryan C. Fattman	Worcester and Norfolk	Republican

=== House ===
Position	Representative	Municipality	Party
Speaker of the House	Ronald Mariano	Quincy	Democratic
Majority Leader			Democratic
Speaker Pro Tempore	Kate Hogan	Stow	Democratic
Assistant Majority Leader	Michael J. Moran	Brighton	Democratic
Second Assistant Majority Leader	Joseph F. Wagner	Chicopee	Democratic
Second Assistant Majority Leader	Sarah K. Peake	Provincetown	Democratic
First Division Chair	James J. O'Day	West Boylston	Democratic
Second Division Chair	Ruth B. Balser	Newton	Democratic
Third Division Chair	Frank A. Moran	Lawrence	Democratic
House Ways and Means Chair	Aaron Michlewitz	Boston	Democratic
Minority Leader	Bradley H. Jones, Jr.	North Reading	Republican
First Assistant Minority Leader	Kimberly N. Ferguson	Holden	Republican
Second Assistant Minority Leader	Paul K. Frost	Auburn	Republican
Third Assistant Minority Leader	Susan Williams Gifford	Wareham	Republican
Third Assistant Minority Leader	F. Jay Barrows	Mansfield	Republican

== Members ==
=== Senators ===
Senate party composition by municipality at the beginning of the 192nd General Court.

State Senate districts by the party of the senator

Name	Party	District	Residence	Assumed office
Michael J. Barrett	Democratic	3rd Middlesex	Lexington	2013
Joseph Boncore (until September 9, 2021)	Democratic	1st Suffolk and Middlesex	Winthrop	2016*
Michael Brady	Democratic	2nd Plymouth and Bristol	Brockton	2015*
William Brownsberger	Democratic	2nd Suffolk and Middlesex	Belmont	2012*
Harriette Chandler	Democratic	1st Worcester	Worcester	2001
Sonia Chang-Díaz	Democratic	2nd Suffolk	Boston	2009
Nick Collins	Democratic	1st Suffolk	Boston	2018*
Joanne Comerford	Democratic	Hampshire, Franklin and Worcester	Northampton	2019
Cynthia Creem	Democratic	1st Middlesex and Norfolk	Newton	1999
Brendan Crighton	Democratic	3rd Essex	Lynn	2018*
John Cronin	Democratic	Worcester and Middlesex	Lunenburg	2021
Julian Cyr	Democratic	Cape and Islands	Truro	2017
Sal DiDomenico	Democratic	Middlesex and Suffolk	Everett	2010*
Diana DiZoglio	Democratic	1st Essex	Methuen	2019
Lydia Edwards (since January 20, 2022)	Democratic	First Suffolk and Middlesex	Boston	2022*
James Eldridge	Democratic	Middlesex and Worcester	Acton	2009
Ryan Fattman	Republican	Worcester and Norfolk	Webster	2015
Paul Feeney	Democratic	Bristol and Norfolk	Foxborough	2017*
Barry Finegold	Democratic	2nd Essex and Middlesex	Andover	2019
Cindy Friedman	Democratic	4th Middlesex	Arlington	2017*
Anne Gobi	Democratic	Worcester, Hampden, Hampshire and Middlesex	Spencer	2015
Adam Gomez	Democratic	Hampden	Springfield	2021
Adam Hinds	Democratic	Berkshire, Hampshire, Franklin, and Hampden	Pittsfield	2017
Patricia Jehlen	Democratic	2nd Middlesex	Somerville	2005*
John Keenan	Democratic	Norfolk and Plymouth	Quincy	2011
Edward Kennedy	Democratic	1st Middlesex	Lowell	2019
Eric Lesser	Democratic	1st Hampden and Hampshire	Longmeadow	2015
Jason Lewis	Democratic	5th Middlesex	Winchester	2014*
Joan Lovely	Democratic	2nd Essex	Salem	2013
Mark Montigny	Democratic	2nd Bristol and Plymouth	New Bedford	1993
Michael Moore	Democratic	2nd Worcester	Millbury	2009
Susan Moran	Democratic	Plymouth and Barnstable	Falmouth	2020*
Patrick O'Connor	Republican	Plymouth and Norfolk	Weymouth	2016*
Marc Pacheco	Democratic	1st Plymouth and Bristol	Taunton	1993
Rebecca Rausch	Democratic	Norfolk, Bristol and Middlesex	Needham	2019
Michael Rodrigues	Democratic	1st Bristol and Plymouth	Westport	2011
Michael Rush	Democratic	Norfolk and Suffolk	Boston	2011
Karen Spilka	Democratic	2nd Middlesex and Norfolk	Ashland	2005
Bruce Tarr	Republican	1st Essex and Middlesex	Gloucester	1995
Walter Timilty	Democratic	Norfolk, Bristol and Plymouth	Milton	2017
John Velis	Democratic	2nd Hampden and Hampshire	Westfield	2020*

- *Originally elected in a special election

=== Representatives ===
The following is a complete list of Members of the House of Representatives in the 192nd General Court, by district:

==== Barnstable, Dukes and Nantucket ====
6 Representatives (3 Democrats, 3 Republicans)

Name	Party	Residence	District	District description	First elected
Tim Whelan	Republican	Brewster	1st Barnstable	Precinct 1 of Barnstable, precincts 1 and 2 of Brewster, Dennis, and precincts 1–4 and 7 of Yarmouth, Barnstable County.	2014
Kip A. Diggs	Democratic	Barnstable	2nd Barnstable	Precincts 2–10 and 13 of Barnstable, and precincts 5 and 6 of Yarmouth, Barnstable County	2020
David Vieira	Republican	Falmouth	3rd Barnstable	Precincts 3–6 of Bourne, precincts 3, 4, 7, 8 and 9 of Falmouth, and Mashpee, Barnstable County	2010
Sarah K. Peake	Democratic	Provincetown	4th Barnstable	Precinct 3 of Brewster, Chatham, Eastham, Harwich, Orleans, Provincetown, Truro and Wellfleet, Barnstable County	2006
Steven Xiarhos	Republican	Barnstable	5th Barnstable	Precincts 11 and 12, of Barnstable, precincts 1, 2, and 7 of Bourne, and Sandwich, Barnstable County; Precinct 9 of Plymouth, Plymouth County	2020
Dylan A. Fernandes	Democratic	Falmouth	Barnstable, Dukes and Nantucket	Precincts 1, 2, 5 and 6, of Falmouth, in Barnstable County; Chilmark, Edgartown, Aquinnah, Gosnold, Oak Bluffs, Tisbury and West Tisbury, all in Dukes County; Nantucket, Nantucket County	2016

==== Berkshire ====
4 Representatives (4 Democrats)

Name	Party	Residence	District	District description	First elected
John Barrett, III	Democratic	North Adams	1st Berkshire	Adams, Cheshire, Clarksburg, Florida, Hancock, Lanesborough, New Ashford, North Adams, and Williamstown, all in Berkshire County;	2017
Paul W. Mark	Democratic	Peru	2nd Berkshire	Dalton, Hinsdale, Peru, Savoy and Windsor, and precinct B of ward 1, of Pittsfield, Berkshire County; Bernardston, Charlemont, Colrain, Greenfield, Hawley, Heath, Leyden, Monroe, Northfield, and Rowe, Franklin County	2010
Tricia Farley-Bouvier	Democratic	Pittsfield	3rd Berkshire	Precinct A of ward 1, all precincts of wards 2–7, of Pittsfield, Berkshire County	2011
William "Smitty" Pignatelli	Democratic	Lenox	4th Berkshire	Alford, Becket, Egremont, Great Barrington, Lee, Lenox, Monterey, Mount Washington, New Marlborough, Otis, Richmond, Sandisfield, Sheffield, Stockbridge, Tyringham, Washington, and West Stockbridge, Berkshire County; Blandford, Russell, and Tolland, Hampden County	2002

==== Bristol ====
14 Representatives (11 Democrats, 3 Republicans)

Name	Party	Residence	District	District description	First elected
F. Jay Barrows	Republican	Mansfield	1st Bristol	Foxborough, Norfolk County; Precincts 2, 3 and 6, of Mansfield, and precincts 3, 4 and 5, of Norton, Bristol County	2006
James K. Hawkins	Democratic	Attleboro	2nd Bristol	Wards 1 and 2, precinct A of ward 3, and Wards 4, 5 and 6, of Attleboro, Bristol County	2018
Carol A. Doherty	Democratic	Taunton	3rd Bristol	Precinct 6 of Easton, and precinct A of ward 3, and all precincts in wards 1, 2, 5, 7 and 8, of Taunton, Bristol County	2020
Steven S. Howitt	Republican	Seekonk	4th Bristol	Precincts 1 and 2 of Norton, Rehoboth and Seekonk, and precincts 4 and 5, of Swansea, Bristol County	2010
Patricia A. Haddad	Democratic	Somerset	5th Bristol	Dighton and Somerset, precincts 1, 2 and 3 of Swansea, and ward 6 of Taunton, Bristol County	2000
Carole A. Fiola	Democratic	Fall River	6th Bristol	Precincts B and C of ward 5, precinct C of ward 6, all precincts of wards 7, 8, and 9, of Fall River, and precinct 1, of Freetown, Bristol County	2012
Alan Silvia	Democratic	Fall River	7th Bristol	Precincts B and C of ward 1, ward 2, ward 3, ward 4, and precinct A of ward 5, of Fall River, Bristol County	2012
Paul Schmid	Democratic	Westport	8th Bristol	Precinct A of ward 1, precincts A and B of ward 6 of Fall River, precincts 2 and 3 of Freetown, precincts D, E and F of ward 1 of New Bedford, and Westport, Bristol County	2010
Christopher M. Markey	Democratic	Dartmouth	9th Bristol	Dartmouth, and precincts D, E and F of ward 3, of New Bedford, Bristol County	2010
William M. Straus	Democratic	Mattapoisett	10th Bristol	Fairhaven, and precinct A of ward 3, and precinct D and E of ward 4, of New Bedford, Bristol County; Marion, Mattapoisett and Rochester, Plymouth County	1992
Christopher Hendricks	Democratic	New Bedford	11th Bristol	Acushnet, precincts A, B, and C, of ward 1 and all precincts of ward 2, and precincts B and C of ward 3, of New Bedford, Bristol County	2018
Norman J. Orrall	Republican	Lakeville	12th Bristol	Berkley, precinct B of ward 3 and ward 4, of Taunton, Bristol County; Lakeville, and precincts 2, 4 and 5 of Middleborough, Plymouth County	2018
Antonio F. D. Cabral	Democratic	New Bedford	13th Bristol	Precincts A, B, C and F of ward 4, and wards 5 and 6, of New Bedford, Bristol County	1990
Adam Scanlon	Democratic	North Attleborough	14th Bristol	Precinct B of ward 3, of Attleboro, precincts 1 and 5, of Mansfield, North Attleborough, Bristol County	2020

==== Essex ====
18 Representatives (15 Democrats, 3 Republicans)

Name	Party	Residence	District	District description	First elected
Vacant			1st Essex	Amesbury and Salisbury, and Newburyport, Essex County	
Lenny Mirra	Republican	West Newbury	2nd Essex	Precincts 2 and 3 of Boxford, Georgetown, Groveland, precinct 3 of ward 4 and precinct 3 of ward 7, of Haverhill, and Merrimac, Newbury, and West Newbury, Essex County	2012
Andy Vargas	Democratic	Haverhill	3rd Essex	Ward 1, precinct 3 of ward 2, ward 3, precincts 1 and 2 of ward 4, precincts 1 and 3 of ward 5, and ward 6, of Haverhill, Essex County	2017
Jamie Zahlaway Belsito	Democratic	Topsfield	4th Essex	Hamilton, Ipswich, Manchester-by-the-Sea, Rowley, Topsfield, and Wenham, Essex County	2021
Ann-Margaret Ferrante	Democratic	Gloucester	5th Essex	Essex and Rockport, and Gloucester, Essex County	2008
Jerald A. Parisella	Democratic	Beverly	6th Essex	Beverly, Essex County	2010
Paul Tucker	Democratic	Salem	7th Essex	Salem, Essex County	2014
Lori A. Ehrlich	Democratic	Marblehead	8th Essex	Precinct 4 of ward 3, and precinct 4 of ward 4, of Lynn, and Marblehead and Swampscott, Essex County	2006
Donald Wong	Republican	Saugus	9th Essex	Precincts 1 and 2 of ward 1, of Lynn, and precincts 1, 2, 4–9, of Saugus, Essex County; Precincts 1, 2, 3 and 7, of Wakefield, Middlesex County	2010
Daniel Cahill	Democratic	Lynn	10th Essex	Precincts 3 and 4 of Ward 1, Ward 2, Precincts 1, 2 and 3 of Ward 3, Precincts 1 and 2 of Ward 4, and Precincts 2 and 3 of Ward 5, of Lynn.	2016
Peter Capano	Democratic	Lynn	11th Essex	Precinct 3 of ward 4, precincts 1 and 4 of ward 5, wards 6 and 7, of Lynn, and Nahant, Essex County	2018
Thomas Walsh	Democratic	Peabody	12th Essex	Wards 1–4 and precincts 1 and 3 of ward 5 of Peabody, Essex County	2016; 1986
Sally P. Kerans	Democratic	Danvers	13th Essex	Danvers, precinct 2 of Middleton and, precinct 2 of ward 5 and ward 6, of Peabody, Essex County	2020; 1990
Christina A. Minicucci	Democratic	North Andover	14th Essex	Precinct 2 of ward 7 in Haverhill, precincts 1 and 3 of ward A and precinct 1 of ward F, of Lawrence, precincts 3, 7, and 10 of Methuen, and precincts 1–5 of North Andover, Essex County	2018
Linda Dean Campbell	Democratic	Methuen	15th Essex	Precincts 1 and 2 of ward 2, precinct 2 of ward 5 and precinct 1 of ward 7 in Haverhill and precincts 1, 4, 5, 6, 8–12 of Methuen, Essex County	2006
Marcos A. Devers	Democratic	Lawrence	16th Essex	Precincts 2 and 4 of ward A, ward B, precinct 4 of ward C, precincts 2, 3 and 4 of ward E, and precincts 2, 3 and 4 of ward F, of Lawrence, Essex County	2018; 2010
Frank A. Moran	Democratic	Lawrence	17th Essex	Precincts 2, 3 and 4, of Andover, precincts 1, 2 and 3, of ward C, ward D, and precinct 1 of ward E, of Lawrence, and precinct 2 in Methuen, Essex County	2012
Tram Nguyen	Democratic	Andover	18th Essex	Precincts 1, 5–9, of Andover, precinct 1, of Boxford and precincts 6, 7 and 8, of North Andover, Essex County; Precincts 3 and 3A of Tewksbury, Middlesex County	2018

==== Franklin ====
2 Representatives (1 Democrat, 1 Unenrolled)

Name	Party	Residence	District	District description	First elected
Natalie M. Blais	Democratic	Sunderland	1st Franklin	Chester, Hampden County; Ashfield, Buckland, Conway, Deerfield, Leverett, Montague, Shelburne, Shutesbury, Sunderland, and Whately, Franklin County; Chesterfield, Cummington, Goshen, Huntington, Middlefield, Plainfield, Williamsburg, and Worthington, Hampshire County	2018
Susannah Whipps	Unenrolled	Athol	2nd Franklin	Erving, Gill, New Salem, Orange, Warwick, and Wendell, Franklin County; Precinct A of Belchertown, Hampshire County; Athol, Petersham, Phillipston, Royalston, and Templeton Worcester County	2015

==== Hampden ====
12 Representatives (9 Democrats, 3 Republicans)

Name	Party	Residence	District	District description	First elected
Todd Smola	Republican	Palmer	1st Hampden	Brimfield, Holland, Palmer and Wales, Hampden County; Precincts B and C, in Ware, Hampshire County; Sturbridge and Warren, Worcester County	2004
Brian M. Ashe	Democratic	Longmeadow	2nd Hampden	Precincts 2, 3 and 4, of East Longmeadow, Hampden, Longmeadow and Monson, Hampden County	2008
Nicholas A. Boldyga	Republican	Southwick	3rd Hampden	Agawam, Granville and Southwick, Hampden County	2011
Kelly W. Pease	Republican	Westfield	4th Hampden	Westfield, Hampden County	2020
Patricia A. Duffy	Democratic	Holyoke	5th Hampden	Holyoke, Hampden County	2020
Michael J. Finn	Democratic	West Springfield	6th Hampden	Precinct A of ward 2, precinct A of ward 3, precinct A of ward 4, of Chicopee, precinct E of ward 2 of Springfield, and West Springfield, Hampden County	2011
Jacob R. Oliveira	Democratic	Ludlow	7th Hampden	Precinct B of ward 6, of Chicopee, Ludlow, precincts E, F and G of ward 8, of Springfield, Hampden County; Precincts B, C, and D, of Belchertown, Hampshire County	2020
Joseph Wagner	Democratic	Chicopee	8th Hampden	Ward 1, precinct B of ward 2, precinct B of ward 3, precinct B of ward 4, precinct B of ward 5, precinct A of ward 6, wards 7, 8 and 9, of Chicopee, Hampden County	1990
Orlando Ramos	Democratic	Springfield	9th Hampden	Precincts A, B, C, D, F and G of ward 2, precincts C, D, G and H of ward 5, precincts F and H of ward 7, and precincts A, B, D and H of ward 8, of Springfield, and precinct A of ward 5 of Chicopee, Hampden County	2020
Carlos González	Democratic	Springfield	10th Hampden	Ward 1, precincts B, C, D, E, F, G and H of ward 3, and precincts A, B and F of ward 6, of Springfield, in Hampden County	2015
Bud Williams	Democratic	Springfield	11th Hampden	Precinct H of ward 2, precinct A of ward 3, ward 4, precincts A, B, E and F of ward 5, precinct E of ward 6, precinct A of ward 7, and precinct C of ward 8, of Springfield, in Hampden County	2017
Angelo Puppolo	Democratic	Springfield	12th Hampden	Precinct 1, of East Longmeadow, precincts C, D, G and H of ward 6, precincts B, C, D, E and G of ward 7, of Springfield, and Wilbraham, all in Hampden County	2006

==== Hampshire ====
3 Representatives (3 Democrats)

Name	Party	Residence	District	District description	First elected
Lindsay Sabadosa	Democratic	Northampton	1st Hampshire	Montgomery, in Hampden County; Hatfield, Northampton, Southampton and Westhampton, Hampshire County	2018
Daniel R. Carey	Democratic	Easthampton	2nd Hampshire	Easthampton, precinct 2 of Granby, Hadley and South Hadley, Hampshire County	2018
Mindy Domb	Democratic	Amherst	3rd Hampshire	Amherst, precinct 1 of Granby and Pelham, Hampshire County	2018

==== Middlesex ====
37 Representatives (34 Democrats, 3 Republicans)

Name	Party	Residence	District	District description	First elected
Sheila C. Harrington	Republican	Groton	1st Middlesex	Ashby, Dunstable, Groton, Pepperell, Townsend, and precinct 1 of Ayer, Middlesex County	2010
James Arciero	Democratic	Westford	2nd Middlesex	Precincts 5, 7 and 8, of Chelmsford and Littleton and Westford, Middlesex County	2009
Kate Hogan	Democratic	Stow	3rd Middlesex	Hudson, Maynard and Stow, all in Middlesex County; Bolton, Worcester County	2009
Danielle W. Gregoire	Democratic	Marlborough	4th Middlesex	Precinct 1 of ward 2, wards 3–6, and precinct 2 of ward 7, of Marlborough, Middlesex County; Precincts 1 and 3 of Northborough, and precincts 1 and 3 of Westborough, Worcester County	2009-2011; 2013
David Paul Linsky	Democratic	Natick	5th Middlesex	Natick and Sherborn, Middlesex County; Precincts 2 and 3, of Millis, Norfolk County	1999
Maria Robinson	Democratic	Framingham	6th Middlesex	Precincts 1, 2, 4–7, 9–12 and 15, of Framingham, Middlesex County	2018
Jack Patrick Lewis	Democratic	Ashland	7th Middlesex	Ashland, and precincts 8, 13, 14, 16, 17 and 18, of Framingham, Middlesex County	2017
Carolyn C. Dykema	Democratic	Holliston	8th Middlesex	Holliston and Hopkinton, Middlesex County; Southborough, and precinct 2, of Westborough, Worcester County	2009
Thomas M. Stanley	Democratic	Waltham	9th Middlesex	Lincoln, and wards 1, 2 and 3, precinct 1 of ward 4, precinct 2 of ward 5, precinct 1 of ward 6, and precinct 1 of ward 7, of Waltham, Middlesex County	2001
John J. Lawn, Jr.	Democratic	Watertown	10th Middlesex	Precinct 1 and 4 of ward 1 of Newton, precinct 2 of ward 4, precinct 1 of ward 5, precinct 2 of ward 6, precinct 2 of ward 7, and wards 8 and 9, of Waltham, and precincts 10, 11 and 12, of Watertown, Middlesex County	2011
Kay Khan	Democratic	Newton	11th Middlesex	Precincts 2 and 3 of ward 1, ward 2, ward 3, ward 4, and precinct 2 of ward 7, of Newton, Middlesex County	1995
Ruth B. Balser	Democratic	Newton	12th Middlesex	Ward 5, ward 6, precincts 1, 3 and 4 of ward 7, and all precincts of ward 8, of Newton, Middlesex County	1999
Carmine Lawrence Gentile	Democratic	Sudbury	13th Middlesex	Precinct 3 in Framingham, ward 1, precinct 2 of ward 2, and precinct 1 of ward 7 in Marlborough, Sudbury, precincts 1, 2 and 3 of Wayland, Middlesex County	2015
Tami L. Gouveia	Democratic	Acton	14th Middlesex	Precincts 1, 2 and 6, of Acton, Carlisle and Concord, and precincts 1 and 9, of Chelmsford, Middlesex County	2018
Michelle L. Ciccolo	Democratic	Lexington	15th Middlesex	Lexington, and Wards 1 and 7, of Woburn, Middlesex County	2018
Vacant			16th Middlesex	Precincts 2, 3 and 6, of Chelmsford, wards 5, 6 and 9, of Lowell, Middlesex County	
Vanna Howard	Democratic	Lowell	17th Middlesex	Precinct 4, of Chelmsford, ward 1, precinct 3 of ward 2, precincts 2 and 3 of ward 4, and wards 10 and 11, of Lowell, Middlesex County	2020
Rady Mom	Democratic	Lowell	18th Middlesex	Precincts 1 and 2 of ward 2, ward 3, precinct 1 of ward 4, and wards 7 and 8, of Lowell, Middlesex County	2015
Dave Robertson	Democratic	Tewksbury	19th Middlesex	Precincts 1, 1A, 2, 2A, 4 and 4A, of Tewksbury, and precincts 1, 2, 4, 5 and 6, of Wilmington, Middlesex County	2018
Bradley H. Jones, Jr.	Republican	North Reading	20th Middlesex	Lynnfield, and precinct 1, of Middleton, Essex County; North Reading, and precincts 1, 6, 7 and 8, of Reading, Middlesex County	1994
Kenneth I. Gordon	Democratic	Bedford	21st Middlesex	Bedford and Burlington, and precinct 3, of Wilmington, Middlesex County	2013
Marc T. Lombardo	Republican	Billerica	22nd Middlesex	Billerica, Middlesex County	2011
Sean Garballey	Democratic	Arlington	23rd Middlesex	Precincts 1, 3, 5, 6, 7, 9, 11, 13–21 of Arlington, precinct 2 of ward 3, and precincts 1 and 2 of ward 6, of Medford, Middlesex County.	2008
Dave Rogers	Democratic	Cambridge	24th Middlesex	Precincts 2, 4, 8, 10 and 12, of Arlington, Belmont, precincts 1 and 3 of ward 11, of Cambridge, Middlesex County	2012
Marjorie C. Decker	Democratic	Cambridge	25th Middlesex	Ward 4, precincts 2 and 3 of ward 6, wards 7 and 8, and precincts 1 and 2 of ward 10, of Cambridge, Middlesex County	2013
Mike Connolly	Democratic	Cambridge	26th Middlesex	Ward 1, precinct 1 of ward 2, ward 3, and precinct 1 of ward 6, of Cambridge, and ward 1 and precinct 1 of ward 2, of Somerville, Middlesex County	2017
Erika Uyterhoeven	Democratic	Somerville	27th Middlesex	Precincts 2 and 3 of ward 2, and wards 3, 5 and 6, of Somerville, Middlesex County	2020
Joseph W. McGonagle, Jr.	Democratic	Everett	28th Middlesex	Everett, Middlesex County	2015
Steven C. Owens	Democratic	Watertown	29th Middlesex	Ward 9, precinct 3 of ward 10, and precinct 2 of ward 11, of Cambridge, and precincts 1–9, of Watertown, Middlesex County	2020
Richard M. Haggerty	Democratic	Woburn	30th Middlesex	Precincts 2–5, of Reading, and wards 2–6, of Woburn, Middlesex County	2018
Michael S. Day	Democratic	Stoneham	31st Middlesex	Stoneham and Winchester, Middlesex County	2014
Kate Lipper-Garabedian	Democratic	Melrose	32nd Middlesex	Precinct 2 of ward 5 in Malden, Melrose, and precincts 4, 5 and 6, of Wakefield, Middlesex County	2020
Steven Ultrino	Democratic	Malden	33rd Middlesex	Ward 2, precinct 1 of ward 3, ward 4, precinct 1 of ward 5, ward 6, precinct 2 of ward 7, and ward 8, of Malden, Middlesex County	2015
Christine P. Barber	Democratic	Somerville	34th Middlesex	Wards 4 and 5, precinct 1 of ward 7, and precinct 2 of ward 8, of Medford, and wards 4 and 7, of Somerville, Middlesex County	2015
Paul J. Donato	Democratic	Medford	35th Middlesex	Ward 1, precinct 2 of ward 3, precinct 1 of ward 7, of Malden, and ward 1 and 2, precinct 1 of ward 3, precinct 2 of ward 7, and precinct 1 of ward 8, of Medford, Middlesex County	2001
Colleen M. Garry	Democratic	Dracut	36th Middlesex	Dracut and Tyngsborough, Middlesex County	2003
Danillo Sena	Democratic	Acton	37th Middlesex	Precincts 3, 4 and 5, of Acton, precinct 2 of Ayer, Boxborough and Shirley, all in Middlesex County; Harvard, and precincts A, C, and D, of Lunenburg, Worcester County	2020

==== Norfolk ====
15 Representatives (14 Democrats, 1 Republican)

Name	Party	Residence	District	District description	First elected
Bruce J. Ayers	Democratic	Quincy	1st Norfolk	Precincts 4 and 5 of ward 3, precincts 1 and 3 of ward 4, precinct 2 of ward 5, and ward 6, of Quincy, and precincts 5, 6, 11, and 12 of Randolph, Norfolk County	1999
Tackey Chan	Democratic	Quincy	2nd Norfolk	Ward 1, precincts 1 and 2 of ward 3, precincts 2 and 4 of ward 4 and precincts 1, 3, 4, and 5 of ward 5, of Quincy, Norfolk County	2011
Ronald Mariano	Democratic	Quincy	3rd Norfolk	Precincts 2, 3 and 4, of Holbrook, ward 2, and precinct 5 of ward 4, of Quincy, precincts 5, 6, 9, 12 and 16, of Weymouth, Norfolk County	1991
James M. Murphy	Democratic	Weymouth	4th Norfolk	Precincts 1–4, 7, 8, 10, 11, 13, 14, 15, 17 and 18, of Weymouth, Norfolk County; Precinct 2 of Hingham, Plymouth County	2001
Mark J. Cusack	Democratic	Braintree	5th Norfolk	Braintree, precinct 1, of Holbrook, precinct 4, of Randolph, Norfolk County	2011
William C. Galvin	Democratic	Canton	6th Norfolk	Avon and Canton, and precincts 1, 5, 7 and 8, of Stoughton, Norfolk County	1991
William J. Driscoll, Jr.	Democratic	Milton	7th Norfolk	Precincts 3–10, of Milton, and precincts 1, 2, 3, 7–10, of Randolph, Norfolk County	2017
Ted Philips	Democratic	Sharon	8th Norfolk	Precinct 4, of Mansfield, Bristol County; Sharon, precincts 2, 3, 4 and 6, of Stoughton, and precincts 3 and 4, of Walpole, Norfolk County	2020
Shawn Dooley	Republican	Norfolk	9th Norfolk	Precincts 3 and 4, of Medfield, precinct 1, of Millis, Norfolk and Plainville, precinct 5, of Walpole, and Wrentham, Norfolk County	2014
Jeffrey Roy	Democratic	Franklin	10th Norfolk	Franklin, and precincts 2, 3 and 4, of Medway, Norfolk County	2013
Paul McMurtry	Democratic	Dedham	11th Norfolk	Dedham, precinct 8, of Walpole, and Westwood, Norfolk County	2007
John H. Rogers	Democratic	Norwood	12th Norfolk	Norwood, precincts 1, 2, 6 and 7, of Walpole, Norfolk County	1992
Denise C. Garlick	Democratic	Needham	13th Norfolk	Dover, precincts 1 and 2 of Medfield, and Needham, Norfolk County	2011
Alice Hanlon Peisch	Democratic	Wellesley	14th Norfolk	Precinct 4, of Wayland, and Weston, Middlesex County; Wellesley, Norfolk County	2003
Tommy Vitolo	Democratic	Brookline	15th Norfolk	Precincts 2–4, 6–13 of Brookline, Norfolk County	2019

==== Plymouth ====
12 Representatives (7 Democrats, 5 Republicans)

Name	Party	Residence	District	District description	First elected
Mathew J. Muratore	Republican	Plymouth	1st Plymouth	Precincts 2–8, 10, 11, 12, 14 and 15, of Plymouth, Plymouth County	2015
Susan Williams Gifford	Republican	Wareham	2nd Plymouth	Carver, precincts 3 and 6, of Middleborough, and Wareham, Plymouth County	2003
Joan Meschino	Democratic	Hull	3rd Plymouth	Cohasset, Norfolk County; Precincts 1 and 3–6, of Hingham, Hull, and precinct 3, of Scituate, Plymouth County	2016
Patrick Joseph Kearney	Democratic	Scituate	4th Plymouth	Marshfield, and precincts 1, 2, 4, 5 and 6, of Scituate, both in Plymouth County	2018
David F. DeCoste	Republican	Norwell	5th Plymouth	Hanover, Norwell and Rockland, Plymouth County	2014
Josh S. Cutler	Democratic	Duxbury	6th Plymouth	Precincts 2-6, of Duxbury, the towns of Hanson and Pembroke, all in Plymouth County	2013
Alyson Sullivan	Republican	Abington	7th Plymouth	Abington, Precincts 2-4 in East Bridgewater and Whitman, Plymouth County	2019
Angelo L. D'Emilia	Republican	Bridgewater	8th Plymouth	Raynham, Bristol County; Bridgewater, Plymouth County	2011
Gerard J. Cassidy	Democratic	Brockton	9th Plymouth	Ward 2, precincts A, B, C of ward 3, precincts A and D of ward 4, precinct A of ward 5, and precincts A and B of ward 7, of Brockton, Plymouth County	2016
Michelle M. DuBois	Democratic	Brockton	10th Plymouth	Precincts B and C of ward 4, precincts B, C and D of ward 5 and ward 6, of Brockton, precinct 1 of East Bridgewater, and West Bridgewater, Plymouth County	2015
Vacant			11th Plymouth	Precincts 1–5, of Easton, Bristol County; Ward 1, precinct D of ward 3, and precincts C and D of ward 7, of Brockton, Plymouth County	
Kathleen R. LaNatra	Democratic	Kingston	12th Plymouth	Precinct 1 of Duxbury, Halifax, Kingston, precinct 1 of Middleborough, precincts 1, 11 and 13 of Plymouth, and Plympton, Plymouth County	2018

==== Suffolk ====
19 Representatives (19 Democrats)

Name	Party	Residence	District	District description	First elected
Adrian C. Madaro	Democratic	East Boston, Boston	1st Suffolk	Precincts 1–14 of ward 1, of Boston, Suffolk County	2015
Daniel Joseph Ryan	Democratic	Charlestown, Boston	2nd Suffolk	Ward 2, of Boston, and Wards 1 and 2, precincts 1 and 3 of ward 3, and precincts 1 and 4 of ward 4, of Chelsea, Suffolk County	2014
Aaron Michlewitz	Democratic	North End, Boston	3rd Suffolk	Precincts 1–4, 6, 7 and 8 of ward 3, precinct 1 and 3 of ward 4, and precinct 1 of ward 5, of Boston, Suffolk County	2009
David Biele	Democratic	South Boston, Boston	4th Suffolk	Precinct 15 of ward 1, ward 6, precincts 1–8 of ward 7, and precinct 3 of ward 13, of Boston, Suffolk County	2018
Liz Miranda	Democratic	Roxbury, Boston	5th Suffolk	Precinct 10 of ward 7, precincts 5, 6, and 7 of ward 8, precinct 6 of ward 12, precincts 1, 2, 4 and 5 of ward 13, precinct 1 of ward 14, precincts 1–5, 7, 8 and 9, of ward 15, and precincts 1 and 2 of ward 17, of Boston, Suffolk County	2018
Russell E. Holmes	Democratic	Mattapan, Boston	6th Suffolk	Precincts 2 and 4–14 of ward 14, precincts 6–9 of ward 17, precincts 7 and 8 of ward 18, and precinct 12 of ward 19, of Boston, Suffolk County	2011
Chynah Tyler	Democratic	Roxbury, Boston	7th Suffolk	Precincts 8, 9 and 10 of ward 4, sub-precinct 2A of ward 5, precincts 1–5 and 8 of ward 12, precincts 4 and 5 of ward 9, and precinct 1 of ward 21, of Boston, Suffolk County	2017
Jay D. Livingstone	Democratic	Back Bay, Boston	8th Suffolk	Precinct 2 and 3 of ward 2, and ward 5, of Cambridge, in Middlesex County; Precinct 5 of ward 3, and precinct 6 of ward 4, and precincts 3–9 and 11 of ward 5, of Boston, Suffolk County	2013
Jon Santiago	Democratic	South End, Boston	9th Suffolk	Precinct 2, 4, 5 and 7 of ward 4, precincts 2 and 10 of ward 5, precincts 1–4 of ward 8, and precincts 1, 2 and 3 of ward 9, of Boston, Suffolk County	2018
Edward F. Coppinger	Democratic	West Roxbury, Boston	10th Suffolk	Precincts 14–16, of Brookline, in Norfolk County; Precincts 1, 5–7, 10–20 of ward 20, of Boston, Suffolk County	2011
Elizabeth A. Malia	Democratic	Jamaica Plain, Boston	11th Suffolk	Ward 11, precincts 7 and 9 of ward 12, precinct 3 of ward 14, and precincts 6, 7, 9, 10, 11 and 13, of ward 19, of Boston, Suffolk County	1998
Brandy Fluker Oakley	Democratic	Mattapan, Boston	12th Suffolk	Precincts 1 and 2 of Milton, Norfolk County; Precincts 8 and 11 of ward 16, precincts 4 and 10–14 of ward 17, precincts 1–6 and 21 of ward 18, of Boston, Suffolk County	2020
Daniel J. Hunt	Democratic	Dorchester, Boston	13th Suffolk	Precinct 3 of ward 3, of the city of Quincy, Norfolk County; Precinct 9 of ward 7, precincts 6–10 of ward 13, precinct 6 of ward 15, precincts 1–7, 9, 10 and 12 of ward 16, and precincts 3 and 5 of ward 17, of Boston, Suffolk County	2014
Rob Consalvo	Democratic	Hyde Park, Boston	14th Suffolk	Precincts 9–20, 22 and 23 of ward 18, precincts 3, 8 and 9 of ward 20, of Boston, Suffolk County	2020
Nika C. Elugardo	Democratic	Jamaica Plain, Boston	15th Suffolk	Precinct 5 of Brookline, Norfolk County; Ward 10, precincts 1–5 and 8 of ward 19, and precincts 2 and 4 of ward 20, of Boston, Suffolk County	2018
Jessica Ann Giannino	Democratic	Revere	16th Suffolk	Precincts 3 and 10, of Saugus, in Essex County; Precincts 2 and 4 of ward 3, precincts 2 and 3 of ward 4, of Chelsea, and precinct 3 of ward 1, precinct 1 of ward 3, ward 4, precincts 1 and 2 of ward 5, and ward 6, of Revere, Suffolk County	2020
Kevin G. Honan	Democratic	Brighton, Boston	17th Suffolk	Precincts 3, 5–12 and 15 of ward 21, and precincts 2, 3, 6, 9 and 10 in ward 22, of Boston, Suffolk County	1987
Michael J. Moran	Democratic	Brighton, Boston	18th Suffolk	Precinct 1, of Brookline, Norfolk County; Precincts 2, 4, 13, 14 and 16 of ward 21, and precincts 1, 4, 5, 7, 8, 11, 12 and 13 of ward 22, of Boston, Suffolk County	2005
Jeffrey Turco	Democratic	Winthrop	19th Suffolk	Precincts 1 and 2 of ward 1, ward 2, precincts 2 and 3 of ward 3, and precinct 3 of ward 5, of Revere, and Winthrop, Suffolk County	2021

==== Worcester ====
18 Representatives (10 Democrats, 8 Republicans)

Name	Party	Residence	District	District description	First elected
Kimberly N. Ferguson	Republican	Holden	1st Worcester	Holden, Paxton, Princeton, Rutland, precinct 1 of Sterling, and precinct 2 of Westminster, Worcester County	2010
Jonathan Zlotnik	Democratic	Gardner	2nd Worcester	Ashburnham, Gardner, Winchendon, and precinct 1 of Westminster, Worcester County	2012
Michael P. Kushmerek	Democratic	Fitchburg	3rd Worcester	Fitchburg and precinct B of Lunenburg, Worcester County	2020
Natalie M. Higgins	Democratic	Leominster	4th Worcester	Leominster, Worcester County	2016
Donald R. Berthiaume, Jr.	Republican	Spencer	5th Worcester	Precinct A, of Ware, Hampshire County; Barre, Brookfield, East Brookfield, Hardwick, Hubbardston, New Braintree, North Brookfield, Oakham, precincts 2, 3 and 4, in Spencer, and West Brookfield, Worcester County	2014
Peter J. Durant	Republican	Spencer	6th Worcester	Precincts 1, 2 and 3 of Charlton, Dudley, Southbridge, and precinct 1, of Spencer, Worcester County	2011
Paul K. Frost	Republican	Auburn	7th Worcester	Auburn, precinct 4 of Charlton, Millbury, and precincts 2 and 3, of Oxford, Worcester County	1996
Michael Soter	Republican	Bellingham	8th Worcester	Bellingham, Norfolk County; Blackstone, Millville, and Uxbridge, Worcester County	2018
David K. Muradian, Jr.	Republican	Grafton	9th Worcester	Grafton, Northbridge and Upton, Worcester County	2014
Brian W. Murray	Democratic	Milford	10th Worcester	Precinct 1, of Medway, Norfolk County; Hopedale, Mendon and Milford, Worcester County	2016
Hannah Kane	Republican	Shrewsbury	11th Worcester	Shrewsbury, and precincts 4 and 5, of Westborough, Worcester County	2015
Meghan Kilcoyne	Democratic	Northborough	12th Worcester	Berlin, Boylston, Clinton, Lancaster, precincts 2 and 4 of Northborough, and precinct 2 of Sterling, Worcester County	2020
John J. Mahoney	Democratic	Worcester	13th Worcester	Precincts 1–4 of ward 1, precinct 2 of ward 3, ward 9, and precinct 1 of ward 10, of Worcester, Worcester County	2010
James J. O'Day	Democratic	West Boylston	14th Worcester	West Boylston, and precinct 5 of ward 1, ward 2, and precincts 1, 3 and 5 of ward 3, of Worcester, Worcester County	2007
Mary S. Keefe	Democratic	Worcester	15th Worcester	Precincts 2–5, of ward 10, precinct 4 of ward 3, ward 4, and precinct 3 of ward 5, of Worcester, Worcester County	2012
Daniel M. Donahue	Democratic	Worcester	16th Worcester	Precincts 1, 2, 4 and 5, of ward 5, ward 6, and precincts 1 and 5 of ward 8, of Worcester, Worcester County	2013
David LeBoeuf	Democratic	Worcester	17th Worcester	Leicester, and ward 7, and precincts 2, 3 and 4 of ward 8, of Worcester, Worcester County	2018
Joseph D. McKenna	Republican	Webster	18th Worcester	Douglas, precincts 1 and 4 of Oxford, Sutton, and Webster, Worcester County	2014

- *Originally elected in a special election

== Changes in membership ==
=== Senate ===
District	Vacated by	Reason for change	Successor	Date of successor's formal installation
1st Suffolk and Middlesex	Joseph A. Boncore	Resigned on September 9, 2021 to become CEO of the Massachusetts Biotechnology Council.	Lydia Edwards (D)	January 20, 2022

=== House of Representatives ===
District	Vacated by	Reason for change	Successor	Date of successor's formal installation
19th Suffolk	Vacant	Robert DeLeo (D) did not accept his seat.	Jeffrey Rosario Turco (D)	April 7, 2021
4th Essex	Bradford Hill	Resigned on September 15, 2021 to serve on the Massachusetts Gaming Commission.	Jamie Belsito (D)	December 8, 2021

== See also ==
- 2020 Massachusetts general election
- COVID-19 pandemic in Massachusetts
- 117th United States Congress
- 2022 Massachusetts gubernatorial election
- List of Massachusetts General Courts
