= Rhonda Nyman =

American politician

Member of the Massachusetts House of Representatives from the 5th Plymouth district
- In office January 5, 2011 – January 7, 2015
- Preceded by: Robert Nyman
- Succeeded by: David DeCoste

Personal details
- Party: Democratic

Rhonda Nyman is an American politician who served in the Massachusetts House of Representatives from 2011 to 2015. She was elected as a Democrat in November 2010, succeeding her husband Robert Nyman who died in office. In the November 2014 election, she was defeated by Republican challenger David DeCoste in a close election, only conceding after the result was verified by a recount.

She also unsuccessfully ran for Plymouth County Commissioner in 2024, losing to incumbents Greg Hanley and Jared Valanzola, a Democrat and Republican, respectively.
