= Michelle Ciccolo =

Massachusetts politician

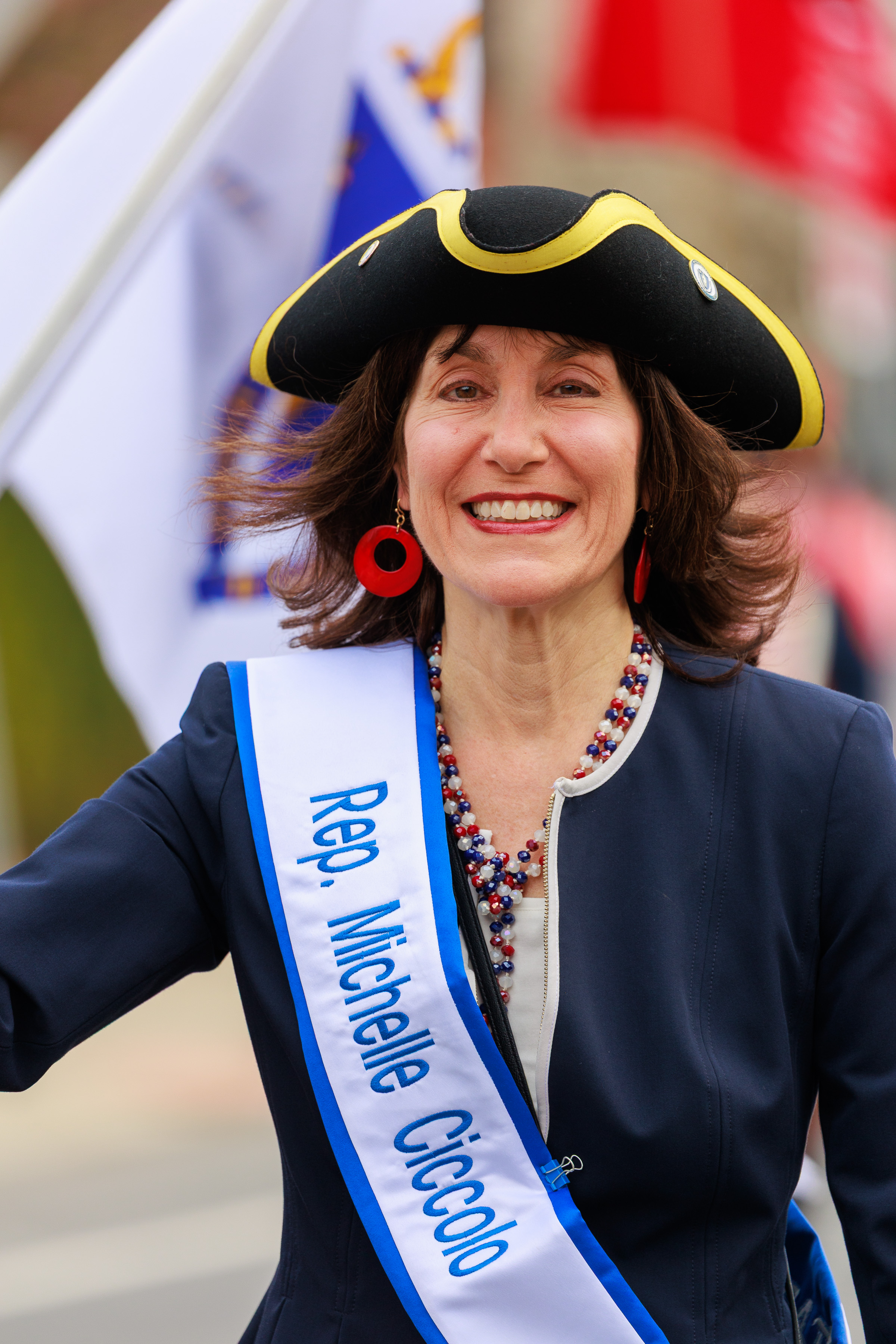
- Ciccolo in the Lexington Patriots' Day parade

Member of the Massachusetts House of Representatives from the 15th Middlesex district
- Incumbent
- Assumed office January 2, 2019
- Preceded by: Jay R. Kaufman

Personal details
- Born: 1967 (age 58–59) Lexington, Massachusetts, U.S.
- Party: Democratic
- Spouse: Philip Jackson
- Children: 2
- Education: Villanova University (BA); University of Massachusetts, Boston (MPA)

Michelle Ciccolo (born 1968) is a State Representative who represents the 15th Middlesex District in the Massachusetts House of Representatives. She represents the town of Lexington, and part of Woburn. Ciccolo serves on the Joint Committee on Elder Affairs, Joint Committee on Environment, Natural Resources and Agriculture, Joint Committee on Financial Services, and the Joint Committee on Public Health.

== See also ==
- 2019–2020 Massachusetts legislature
- 2021–2022 Massachusetts legislature
