= Jim Hawkins (politician) =

American politician

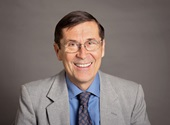

Member of the Massachusetts House of Representatives from the 2nd Bristol district
- Incumbent
- Assumed office April 4, 2018
- Preceded by: Paul Heroux

Personal details
- Born: James K. Hawkins; October 17, 1949 (age 76) Walpole, Massachusetts
- Party: Democratic
- Education: Colby College; Providence College School of Business
- Profession: Teacher (retired)
- Website: www.hawkins4rep.com

James K. Hawkins is an American politician from the Commonwealth of Massachusetts. A member of the Democratic Party, Hawkins serves in the Massachusetts House of Representatives, representing the 2nd Bristol District since 2018, which includes all but one precinct of Attleboro.

== Early life ==
Hawkins was born and raised in Walpole, Massachusetts. He moved to Attleboro and has lived there for over 35 years. He graduated from Colby College and then went on to earn an MBA from Providence College School of Business. Hawkins sold auto parts before getting his master's degree and working as a math teacher at Attleboro High School.

== Political career ==
Hawkins won a special election on April 3, 2018, to succeed Paul Heroux in the Massachusetts House. Hawkins bested Republican Julie Hall in the special election. Hawkins took 3,927 votes to Hall's 3,633.

On Hawkins' first day in office, he filed an amendment to fund the Massachusetts Consortium for Innovative Education Assessment (MCIEA), a collaboration of school officials and teachers finding ways to evaluate student performance that is better, more fair, less punitive, and less disruptive than what is currently used in Massachusetts schools.

== Personal life ==
Hawkins was a regular racer at the Seekonk Speedway.

== See also ==
- 2019–2020 Massachusetts legislature
- 2021–2022 Massachusetts legislature
