= Norman Orrall =

Massachusetts politician

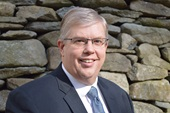

Member of the Massachusetts House of Representatives from the 12th Bristol district
- Incumbent
- Assumed office January 2, 2019
- Preceded by: Keiko Orrall

Personal details
- Party: Republican
- Spouse: Keiko Orrall
- Education: University of Massachusetts

Norman Orrall is a State Representative currently serving in the Massachusetts House of Representatives representing Berkley, East Taunton, Lakeville, and Middleborough as the 12th Bristol District. He has been serving since 2018 and is a member of the Republican Party. Orrall serves on the Joint Committee on State Administration and Regulatory Oversight, the House Committee on Bonding, Capital Expenditures and State Assets, the Joint Committee on Environment, Natural Resources and Agriculture, and the Joint Committee on Transportation. He is a 1990 graduate of the University of Massachusetts, and worked as a civil engineer and Lakeville Town Moderator prior to his election in 2018. He and his wife, Keiko, have two daughters.

== See also ==
- 2019–2020 Massachusetts legislature
- 2021–2022 Massachusetts legislature
