= Matt Muratore =

American politician

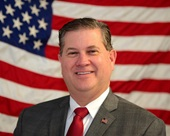

Member of the Massachusetts House of Representatives from the 1st Plymouth district
- In office January 7, 2015 – January 1, 2025
- Preceded by: Vinny deMacedo
- Succeeded by: Michelle Badger

Personal details
- Party: Republican

Mathew J. Muratore is a former member of the Massachusetts House of Representatives. A resident of Plymouth, Massachusetts, he was elected as a Republican to represent the 1st Plymouth district. Muratore is a former Plymouth selectman.

== See also ==
- 2019–2020 Massachusetts legislature
- 2021–2022 Massachusetts legislature
