= Steven Ultrino =

American politician

Member of the Massachusetts House of Representatives from the 33rd Middlesex district
- Incumbent
- Assumed office January 7, 2015
- Preceded by: Christopher Fallon

Personal details
- Party: Democratic

Steven Ultrino is a member of the Massachusetts House of Representatives. A resident of Malden, Massachusetts, he was elected as a Democrat to represent the 33rd Middlesex district. Prior to his election, Ultrino served for several years on the Malden City Council.

== See also ==
- 2019–2020 Massachusetts legislature
- 2021–2022 Massachusetts legislature
