= David DeCoste =

American politician

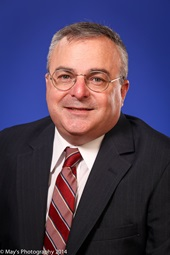

Member of the Massachusetts House of Representatives from the 5th Plymouth district
- Incumbent
- Assumed office January 7, 2015
- Preceded by: Rhonda Nyman

Personal details
- Party: Republican

David F. DeCoste is a member of the Massachusetts House of Representatives. DeCoste is a Republican who first represented the Fifth Plymouth District (Hanover, Rockland, and his hometown of Norwell) in 2014.

== See also ==
- 2019–2020 Massachusetts legislature
- 2021–2022 Massachusetts legislature
