= Joseph D. McKenna =

American politician

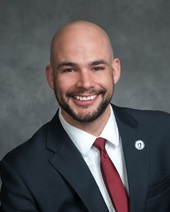

Member of the Massachusetts House of Representatives from the 18th Worcester district
- Incumbent
- Assumed office January 7, 2015
- Preceded by: Ryan Fattman

Personal details
- Party: Republican

Joseph D. McKenna is a member of the Massachusetts House of Representatives, sworn in January 2015. A resident of Webster, Massachusetts, he was elected as a Republican to represent the 18th Worcester district. McKenna is a former clinical counselor and legislative aide.

== Committee memberships ==
- Joint Committee on Consumer Protection and Professional Licensure
- Joint Committee on Labor and Workforce Development

== See also ==
- 2019–2020 Massachusetts legislature
- 2021–2022 Massachusetts legislature
