= 2019–2020 Massachusetts legislature =

191st Massachusetts General Court

191st Massachusetts General Court
←	190th	192nd	→
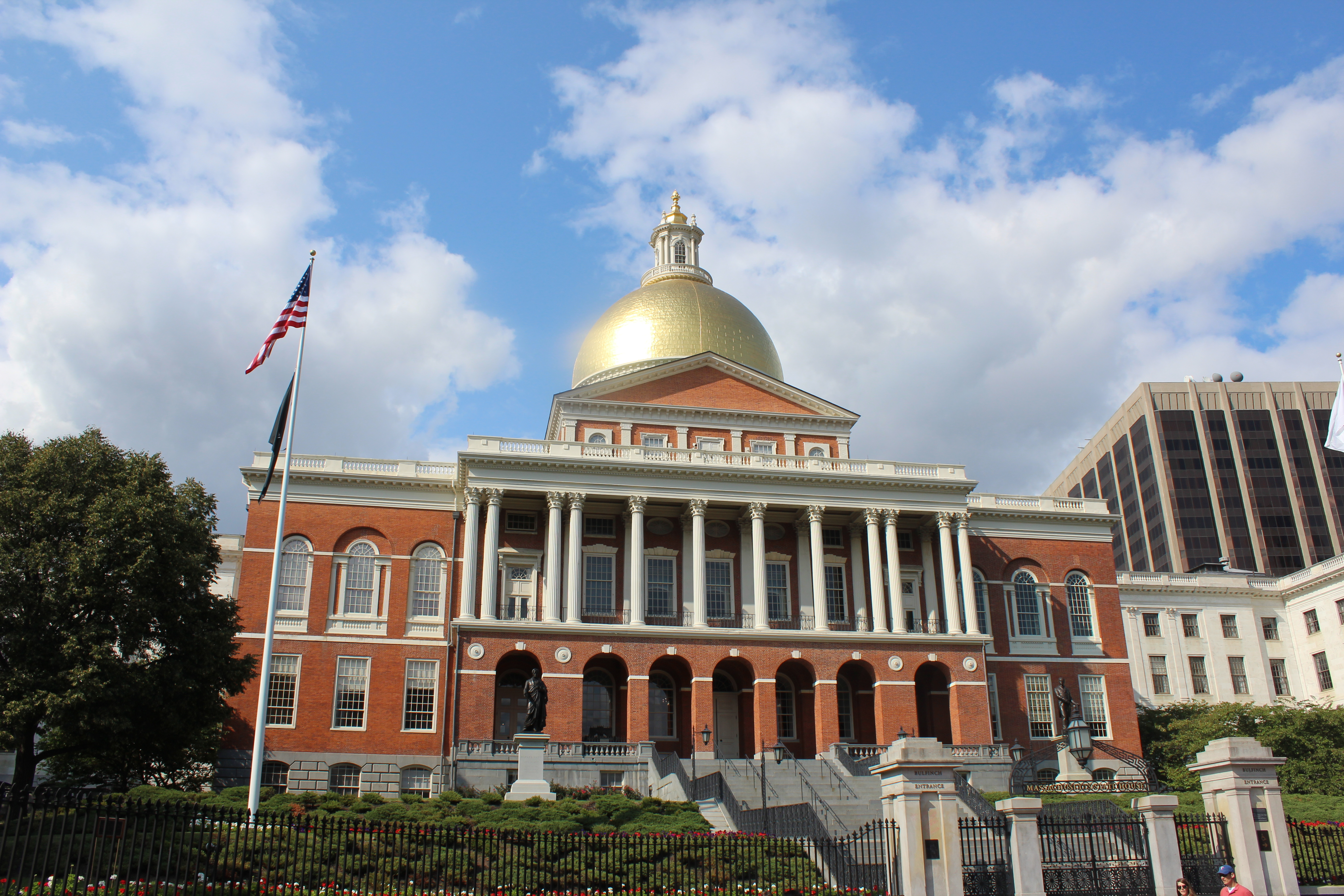
- Massachusetts State House in 2017

Overview
- Legislative body: Massachusetts General Court
- Term: January 2, 2019 – January 6, 2021
- Election: 2018 election

Massachusetts Senate
- Members: 40
- Senate President: Karen Spilka (D)
- Senate Majority Leader: Cynthia Stone Creem (D)
- Senate Minority Leader: Bruce Tarr (R)
- Party control: Democratic

Massachusetts House of Representatives
- Members: 160
- House Speaker: Robert DeLeo (D)
- House Majority Leader: Ron Mariano (D)
- House Minority Leader: Brad Jones (R)
- Party control: Democratic

The 191st Massachusetts General Court was the meeting of the legislative branch of the state government of Massachusetts, composed of the Senate and the House of Representatives. It convened in Boston at the Massachusetts State House, on January 2, 2019, and ended on January 6, 2021, during the fifth and sixth years of the governorship of Charlie Baker. Senate and House districts were drawn based on the 2010 Census.

In the 2018 elections, the Democratic Party increased its majorities in both chambers, flipping two seats from the Republicans in the House and one in the Senate. Although Republican Governor Charlie Baker easily won re-election to a second term, the Democrats maintained veto-proof supermajorities in the legislature.

The session was notable for the wide range of flash-point issues discussed; among these were climate change, police reform, the state's response to the COVID-19 pandemic, healthcare reform, and education funding. Other notable legislation included a pandemic-related vote-by-mail law. Notable bills include a proposal for a commission focused on "state agency automated decision-making, artificial intelligence, transparency, fairness, and individual rights."

== Party summary ==
=== Senate ===
Affiliation	Party (shading indicates majority caucus)			Total	Vacant
Affiliation	Democratic	Independent	Republican	Total	Vacant
End of previous General Court	31	0	7	38	2
Begin (January 2, 2019)	34	0	6	40	0
November 29, 2019 (Note: In Plymouth and Barnstable district: Senator Vinny deMacedo (R) resigned to take a job in higher education.)	34	0	5	39	1
January 6, 2020 (Note: In 2nd Hampden and Hampshire district: Senator Don Humason (R) resigned to serve as Mayor of Westfield.)	34	0	4	38	2
May 28, 2020 (Note: In Plymouth and Barnstable district: Susan Moran (D) assumed office to continue Vinny deMacedo's term.) (Note: In 2nd Hampden and Hampshire district: John Velis (D) assumed office to continue Don Humason's term.)	36	0	4	40	0
Latest voting share	90.0%	0.0%	10.0%		

=== House of Representatives ===
Affiliation	Party (shading indicates majority caucus)			Total	Vacant
Affiliation	Democratic	Independent	Republican	Total	Vacant
End of previous General Court	119	1	34	154	6
Begin (January 2, 2019)	127	1	32	160	0
November 15, 2019 (Note: In 32nd Middlesex district: Rep. Paul Brodeur (D) resigned to serve as Mayor of Melrose.)	126	1	32	159	1
January 6, 2020 (Note: In 3rd Bristol district: Rep. Shaunna O'Connell (R) resigned to serve as Mayor of Taunton.)	126	1	31	158	2
January 8, 2020 (Note: In 37th Middlesex district: Rep. Jen Benson (D) resigned to serve as President of the Alliance for Business Leadership.)	125	1	31	157	3
March 25, 2020 (Note: In 32nd Middlesex district: Kate Lipper-Garabedian (D) assumed office to continue Paul Brodeur's term.)	126	1	31	158	2
May 28, 2020 (Note: In 4th Hampden district: Rep. John Velis (D) resigned to serve as state senator for the 2nd Hampden and Hampshire district.)	125	1	31	157	3
June 10, 2020 (Note: Carol Doherty (D) and Dan Sena (D) assumed office to continue Shaunna O'Connell and Jen Benson's terms, respectively.)	127	1	31	159	1
Latest voting share	79.9%	0.6%	19.5%		

== Members ==
=== Senators ===
Portrait	Name	Party	District	Residence	Assumed office
	Michael J. Barrett	Democratic	3rd Middlesex	Lexington	2013
	Joseph Boncore	Democratic	1st Suffolk and Middlesex	Winthrop	2016*
	Michael Brady	Democratic	2nd Plymouth and Bristol	Brockton	2015*
	William Brownsberger	Democratic	2nd Suffolk and Middlesex	Belmont	2012*
	Harriette Chandler	Democratic	1st Worcester	Worcester	2001
	Sonia Chang-Díaz	Democratic	2nd Suffolk	Boston	2009
	Nick Collins	Democratic	1st Suffolk	Boston	2018*
	Joanne Comerford	Democratic	Hampshire, Franklin and Worcester district	Northampton	2019
	Cynthia Creem	Democratic	1st Middlesex and Norfolk	Newton	1999
	Brendan Crighton	Democratic	3rd Essex	Lynn	2018*
	Julian Cyr	Democratic	Cape and Islands	Truro	2017
	Sal DiDomenico	Democratic	Middlesex and Suffolk	Everett	2010*
	Diana DiZoglio	Democratic	1st Essex	Methuen	2019
	James Eldridge	Democratic	Middlesex and Worcester	Acton	2009
	Ryan Fattman	Republican	Worcester and Norfolk	Webster	2015
	Paul Feeney	Democratic	Bristol and Norfolk	Foxborough	2017*
	Barry Finegold	Democratic	2nd Essex and Middlesex	Andover	2019
	Cindy Friedman	Democratic	4th Middlesex	Arlington	2017*
	Anne Gobi	Democratic	Worcester, Hampden, Hampshire and Middlesex	Spencer	2015
	Adam Hinds	Democratic	Berkshire, Hampshire, Franklin, and Hampden	Pittsfield	2017
	Patricia Jehlen	Democratic	2nd Middlesex	Somerville	2005*
	John Keenan	Democratic	Norfolk and Plymouth	Quincy	2011
	Edward Kennedy	Democratic	1st Middlesex	Lowell	2019
	Eric Lesser	Democratic	1st Hampden and Hampshire	Longmeadow	2015
	Jason Lewis	Democratic	5th Middlesex	Winchester	2014*
	Joan Lovely	Democratic	2nd Essex	Salem	2013
	Mark Montigny	Democratic	2nd Bristol and Plymouth	New Bedford	1993
	Michael Moore	Democratic	2nd Worcester	Millbury	2009
	Susan Moran	Democratic	Plymouth and Barnstable	Falmouth	2020*
	Patrick O'Connor	Republican	Plymouth and Norfolk	Weymouth	2016*
	Marc Pacheco	Democratic	1st Plymouth and Bristol	Taunton	1993
	Rebecca Rausch	Democratic	Norfolk, Bristol and Middlesex	Needham	2019
	Michael Rodrigues	Democratic	1st Bristol and Plymouth	Westport	2011
	Michael Rush	Democratic	Norfolk and Suffolk	Boston	2011
	Karen Spilka	Democratic	2nd Middlesex and Norfolk	Ashland	2005
	Bruce Tarr	Republican	1st Essex and Middlesex	Gloucester	1995
	Walter Timilty	Democratic	Norfolk, Bristol and Plymouth	Milton	2017
	Dean Tran	Republican	Worcester and Middlesex	Fitchburg	2017*
	John Velis	Democratic	2nd Hampden and Hampshire	Westfield	2020*
	James Welch	Democratic	Hampden	West Springfield	2011

- *Originally elected in a special election

=== Representatives ===
portrait	name	date of birth	district
	James Arciero	August 27, 1974	2nd Middlesex
	Brian Ashe	April 23, 1963	
	Bruce Ayers	April 17, 1962	
	Ruth Balser	October 30, 1948	
	Christine Barber		
	John Barrett (Massachusetts politician)	1947	
	F. Jay Barrows	April 5, 1956	
	Donnie Berthiaume		
	David Biele		
	Natalie Blais		
	Nicholas Boldyga		
	Antonio Cabral	January 26, 1955	
	Daniel Cahill		
	Linda Dean Campbell		
	Peter Capano		
	Daniel R. Carey		
	Gerard Cassidy		
	Tackey Chan	August 10, 1973	
	Michelle Ciccolo		
	Mike Connolly (Massachusetts politician)	June 3, 1980	
	Edward F. Coppinger		
	William Crocker Jr.	2000	
	Claire D. Cronin		
	Dan Cullinane		
	Mark Cusack	1984	
	Josh S. Cutler	January 22, 1971	
	Angelo D'Emilia		
	Michael S. Day		
	Marjorie Decker		
	David DeCoste		
	Robert DeLeo (politician)	March 27, 1950	
	Marcos Devers	October 25, 1950	
	Carol Doherty		
	Mindy Domb	1959	
	Dan Donahue	May 1, 1987	
	Paul Donato	October 27, 1941	
	Shawn Dooley		
	William Driscoll		
	Michelle DuBois	April 14, 1973	
	Peter Durant		
	Carolyn Dykema	December 26, 1967	
	Lori Ehrlich	June 9, 1963	
	Nika Elugardo	July 31, 1973	
	Tricia Farley-Bouvier		
	Kimberly Ferguson		
	Dylan Fernandes		
	Ann-Margaret Ferrante	June 26, 1972	
	Michael Finn	March 24, 1970	
	Carole Fiola		
	Paul Frost	April 25, 1970	
	William C. Galvin	October 18, 1956	
	Sean Garballey	February 22, 1985	
	Denise Garlick		
	Colleen Garry	July 21, 1962	
	Carmine Gentile		
	Susan Williams Gifford	November 3, 1959	
	Thomas Golden Jr.	March 5, 1971	
	Carlos Gonzalez (legislator)		
	Ken Gordon (American politician)	November 4, 1959	
	Tami Gouveia		
	Danielle Gregoire		
	Patricia Haddad	May 7, 1950	
	Richard Haggerty		
	Sheila Harrington	1960	
	Jim Hawkins (politician)	October 17, 1949	
	Stephan Hay		
	Jon Hecht		
	Christopher Hendricks		
	Natalie Higgins	July 24, 1988	
	Bradford Hill	January 22, 1967	
	Kate Hogan	January 15, 1957	
	Russell Holmes	August 17, 1969	
	Kevin Honan	June 5, 1958	
	Steve Howitt		
	Daniel J. Hunt		
	Randy Hunt (politician)	August 24, 1957	
	Bradley Jones Jr.	January 9, 1965	
	Louis Kafka	November 28, 1945	
	Hannah Kane	1971	
	Patrick J. Kearney		
	Mary Keefe		
	James Kelcourse		
	Kay Khan	June 22, 1941	
	Kathleen LaNatra		
	John J. Lawn		
	David LeBoeuf	1989	
	Susannah Whipps		
	Jack Patrick Lewis		
	David Linsky	October 16, 1957	
	Kate Lipper-Garabedian		
	Jay Livingstone		
	Marc Lombardo		
	Adrian Madaro	1988	
	John J. Mahoney		
	Liz Malia	September 30, 1949	
	Ronald Mariano	October 31, 1946	
	Paul Mark		
	Christopher Markey		
	Joe McGonagle		
	Joseph D. McKenna		
	Paul McMurtry	October 28, 1965	
	Joan Meschino		
	Aaron Michlewitz	1978	
	Christina Minicucci		
	Liz Miranda	June 29, 1981	
	Lenny Mirra	February 23, 1964	
	Rady Mom	1970	
	Frank A. Moran		
	Michael Moran (Massachusetts politician)	February 23, 1971	
	David Muradian	November 21, 1982	
	Matt Muratore		
	James M. Murphy	November 15, 1969	
	Brian Murray (politician)		
	David Nangle	December 18, 1960	
	Harold Naughton Jr.	July 4, 1960	
	Tram Nguyen	June 22, 1986	
	Jim O'Day	May 23, 1954	
	Norman Orrall		
	Jerry Parisella		
	Sarah Peake	October 4, 1957	
	Alice Peisch	October 4, 1954	
	Thomas Petrolati	March 16, 1957	
	William "Smitty" Pignatelli	August 31, 1959	
	Elizabeth Poirier	October 27, 1942	
	Denise Provost	March 9, 1951	
	Angelo Puppolo		
	Dave Robertson (Massachusetts politician)		
	Maria Robinson	March 25, 1987	
	Dave Rogers (Massachusetts politician)		
	John H. Rogers	October 22, 1964	
	Jeffrey Roy	September 8, 1961	
	Daniel Joseph Ryan		
	Lindsay Sabadosa		
	Jon Santiago		
	Angelo Scaccia	September 29, 1942	
	Paul Schmid		
	Danillo Sena	September 7, 1986	
	Alan Silvia	October 19, 1951	
	Todd Smola	1977	
	Michael Soter		
	Theodore C. Speliotis	August 20, 1953	
	Thomas M. Stanley	March 23, 1964	
	William M. Straus	June 26, 1956	
	Alyson Sullivan	February 7, 1988	
	Jose Tosado	December 18, 1953	
	Paul Tucker (politician)		
	Chynah Tyler		
	Steven Ultrino		
	Andy Vargas		
	Aaron Vega	August 25, 1970	
	John Velis	January 26, 1979	
	David Vieira (politician)		
	RoseLee Vincent		
	Tommy Vitolo	1978	
	Joseph Wagner (Massachusetts politician)	May 7, 1960	
	Thomas Walsh (Massachusetts politician)	July 15, 1960	
	Tim Whelan (politician)		
	Bud Williams		
	Donald Wong	January 15, 1952	
	Jonathan Zlotnik	May 7, 1990	

== See also ==
- 2018 Massachusetts general election
- 2020 Massachusetts general election
- List of current Massachusetts House of Representatives committees
- COVID-19 pandemic in Massachusetts
- 116th United States Congress
- List of Massachusetts General Courts
