= Frank A. Moran =

American politician

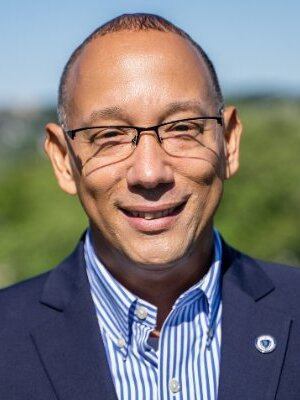
- Official portrait

Member of the Massachusetts House of Representatives from the 17th Essex District
- Incumbent
- Assumed office 2013
- Preceded by: Paul Adams

Member of the Lawrence City Council
- In office 2008–2013

Personal details
- Party: Democratic

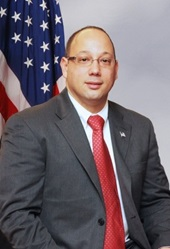
Official portrait

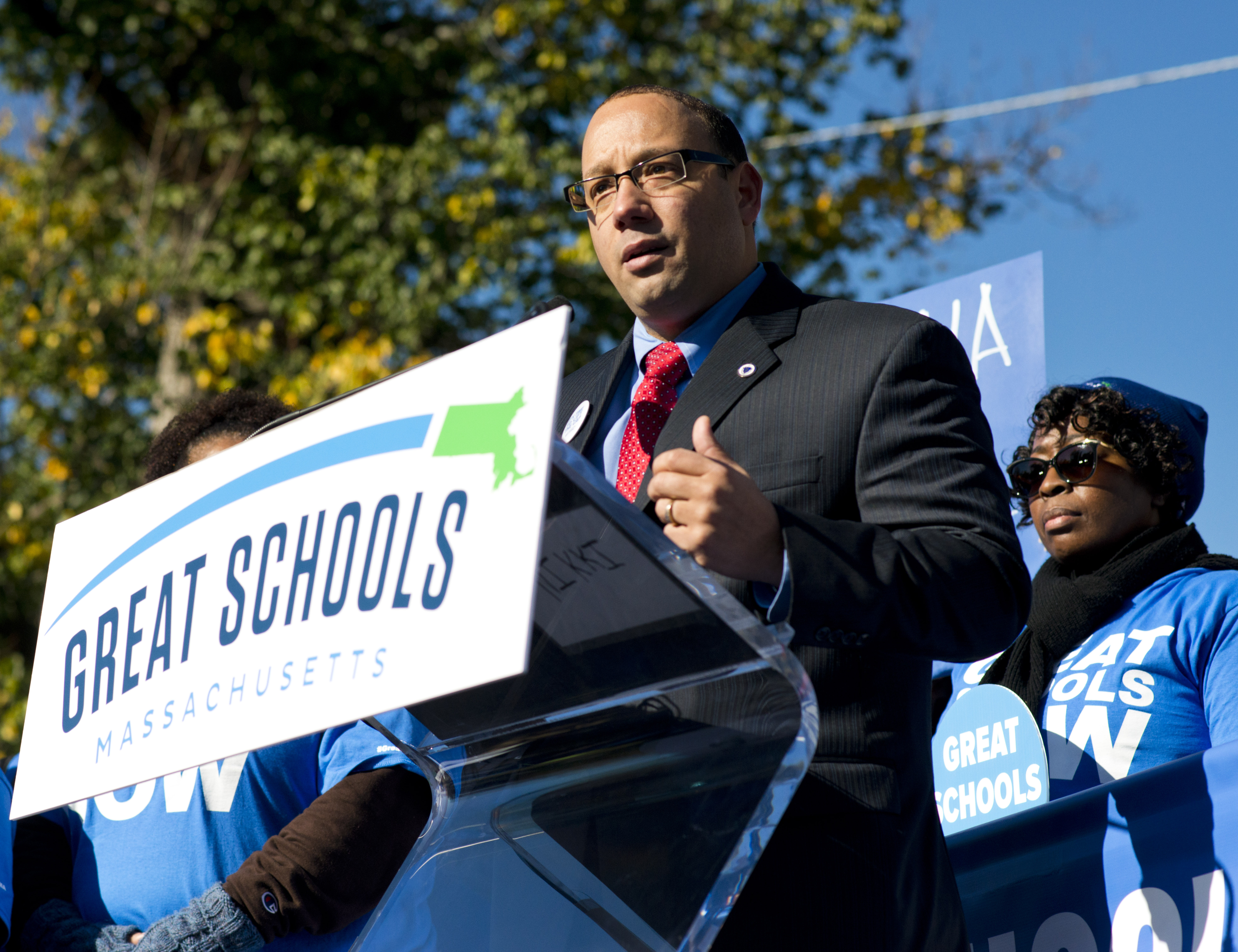
Moran in 2015

Frank A. Moran is an American state legislator serving in the Massachusetts House of Representatives. He served on the Lawrence, Massachusetts City Council from 2008 – 2013, including three years as Council President. He is a member of the Massachusetts Black and Latino Legislative Caucus.

== See also ==
- 2019–2020 Massachusetts legislature
- 2021–2022 Massachusetts legislature
