= Chris Walsh (politician) =

American architect and politician (1951–2018)

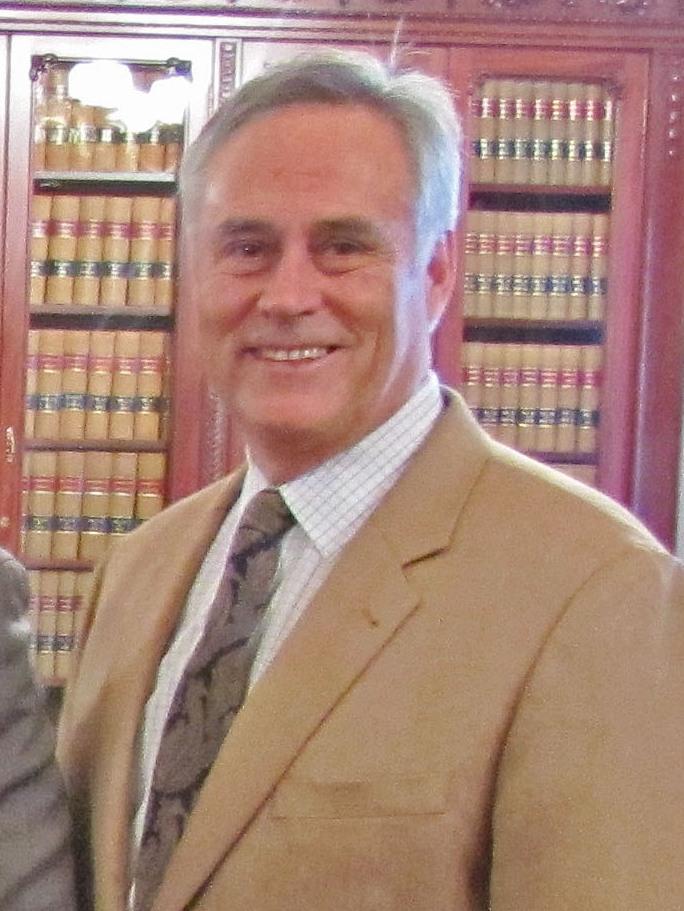
- Walsh in 2013

Member of the Massachusetts House of Representatives from the 6th Middlesex district
- In office 2010 – May 2, 2018
- Preceded by: Pam Richardson
- Succeeded by: Maria Robinson

Personal details
- Born: May 20, 1951 New York City, U.S.
- Died: May 2, 2018 (aged 66) Framingham, Massachusetts, U.S.
- Party: Democratic
- Education: Rhode Island School of Design
- Occupation: architect

Chris Walsh (May 20, 1951 – May 2, 2018) was an American architect and politician.

Born in New York City, New York, Walsh received his degree in architect from Rhode Island School of Design and was an architect. Walsh lived in Framingham, Massachusetts. Walsh served in the Massachusetts House of Representatives from 2010 until his death and was a Democrat. Walsh died from cancer on May 2, 2018.
