= Ruth Balser =

American politician

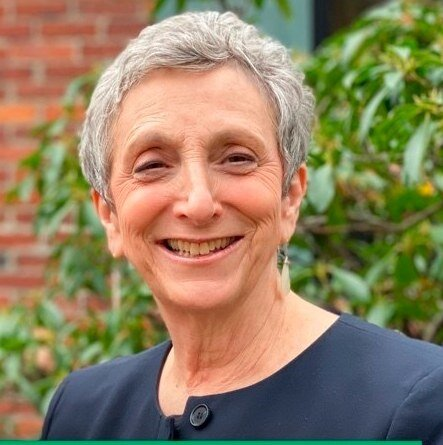

Member of the Massachusetts House of Representatives from the 12th district
- In office 1999–Incumbent

Personal details
- Born: October 30, 1948 (age 77) United States
- Education: New York University (PhD)

Ruth B. Balser (born October 30, 1948) is an American state legislator serving in the Massachusetts House of Representatives. She is a Newton resident and a member of the Democratic Party.

Balser received her bachelor's degree at the University of Rochester and her PhD in clinical psychology at New York University. She was a practicing clinical psychologist. She was an alderman for the City of Newton from 1988 to 1995 and has been a member of the state legislature since 1999.

Balser was a political opponent of former Massachusetts House Speaker Thomas Finneran. She voted against Finneran's renewal of tenure as Speaker in 2003. She, along with several other opponents of Finneran, were demoted to appointments on a committee that held training sessions for House members. Her political fortunes improved when Finneran was replaced by Salvatore DiMasi as Speaker in 2004. Balser served two terms as the House Chair of the Joint Committee on Mental Health and Substance Abuse.

She ran for mayor of Newton in 2009 and was endorsed by The Boston Globe. She lost narrowly to former John Kerry aide Setti Warren, 51–49 percent. She is Jewish.

== See also ==
- Massachusetts House of Representatives' 12th Middlesex district
- 2019–2020 Massachusetts legislature
- 2021–2022 Massachusetts legislature
