= Dennis Rosa =

American politician

Member of the Massachusetts House of Representatives

Dennis A. Rosa is an American politician who served in the Massachusetts House of Representatives until 2017. He is a Leominster resident and a member of the Democratic Party.

== See also ==
- Massachusetts House of Representatives' 4th Worcester district
