= Susannah Whipps =

American politician

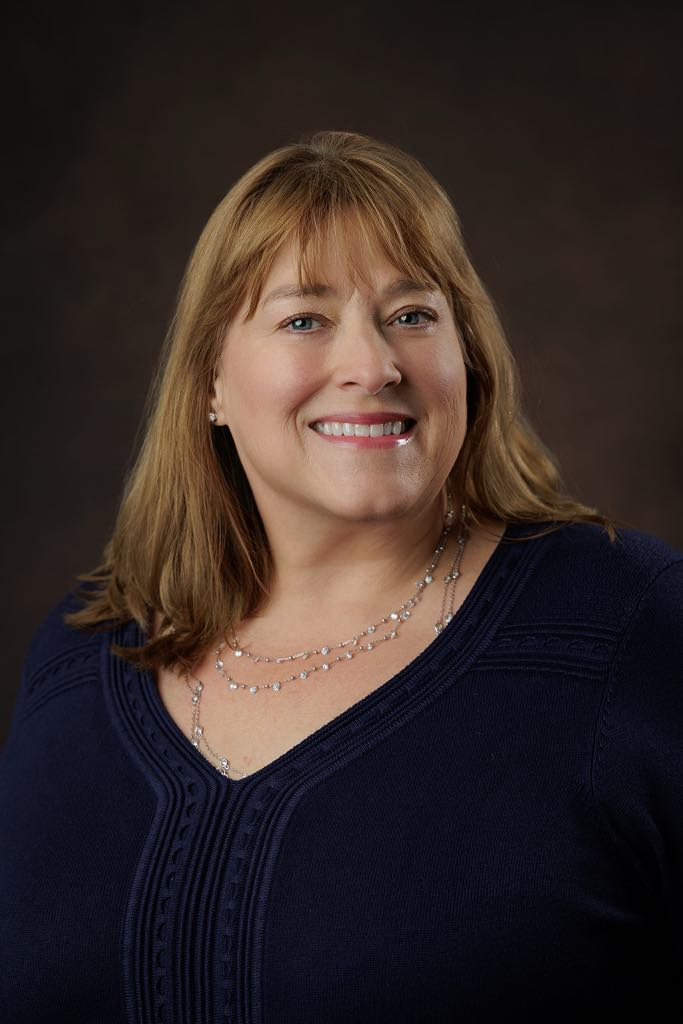
- Whipps in 2024

Member of the Massachusetts House of Representatives from the 2nd Franklin district
- Incumbent
- Assumed office January 7, 2015
- Preceded by: Denise Andrews

Personal details
- Born: Susannah Whipps Lee
- Party: Independent (since 2017)
- Other political affiliations: Republican (until 2017)
- Occupation: Business owner

Susannah M. Whipps is a member of the Massachusetts House of Representatives, first sworn in on January 7, 2015. A seventh generation resident of Athol, Massachusetts, she was elected as a Republican to represent the 2nd Franklin District, but changed her party affiliation to independent in August 2017. The 2nd Franklin District consists of 12 communities in central and western Massachusetts.

Whipps serves on the Joint Committee on Mental Health and Substance Abuse, Joint Committee on Municipalities and Regional Government, Joint Committee on Elder Affairs, and the Joint Committee on State Administration and Regulatory Oversight. She also serves on the Statewide Taskforce on Child Sexual Abuse Prevention. Whipps is a co-owner of Whipps, Inc. a local stainless-steel equipment manufacturer.

On August 21, 2017, Whipps announced that she had officially changed her voter registration from Republican to unenrolled (independent). "I represent a district where nearly 2/3 of the voters are unaffiliated with any major political party" explained Whipps. Public records show that 65% of voters in the 2nd Franklin District are unenrolled, 22% are registered as members of the Democratic Party, and 12% are registered as members of the Republican Party.

== See also ==
- 2019–2020 Massachusetts legislature
- 2021–2022 Massachusetts legislature
