= Douglas W. Petersen =

American politician

Member of the Massachusetts House of Representatives from the 8th Essex district
- In office 1991–2007
- Preceded by: Lawrence Alexander
- Succeeded by: Lori Ehrlich

Personal details
- Born: March 7, 1948 Rockville Centre, New York, U.S.
- Died: July 1, 2014 (age 66) Portland, Maine
- Party: Democratic
- Education: Wagner College; Simmons College; Harvard University
- Occupation: Politician

Douglas W. Petersen (March 7, 1948 – July 1, 2014) was an American politician who served as Commissioner of the Massachusetts Department of Agricultural Resources from 2007 to 2009 and represented the 8th Essex District in the Massachusetts House of Representatives from 1991 to 2007. In 2007, Petersen upset residents of Lynn, Massachusetts after he stated at a Swampscott School Committee meeting that Swampscott children would "be captains of industry" who would one day need good employees "so we have to educate Lynn kids". He was born on Long Island and lived in Marblehead at the time of his death.
