= Lori Ehrlich =

American politician (born 1963)

Lori A. Ehrlich
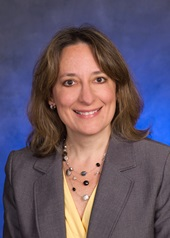

Member of the Massachusetts House of Representatives from the Eighth Essex district
- In office March 4, 2008 – January 4, 2023
- Preceded by: Douglas W. Petersen
- Succeeded by: Jenny Armini

Personal details
- Born: June 9, 1963 (age 63) Lynn, Massachusetts, U.S.
- Party: Democratic
- Education: Lehigh University (BS); Harvard Kennedy School (MPA)
- Occupation: Politician
- Website: www.loriehrlich.com

Lori A. Ehrlich (born June 9, 1963) is a former State Representative for the Massachusetts 8th Essex District. Ehrlich won her seat on a March 4, 2008, special election after her predecessor, Doug Petersen, resigned. Peterson was appointed Commissioner of Agriculture by Governor Deval Patrick. After completing Petersen's term, Ehrlich went on to win re-election in November 2008. During her tenure as a state legislator, Ehrlich was the chairwoman of the Joint Committee on Export Development.

== Early life and education ==
The Ehrlich family has lived in the 8th Essex District for three generations. Lori (Litman) Ehrlich was born in Lynn, raised in Marblehead, and schooled in Swampscott. After graduating from Lehigh University in 1985 with a B.S. in accounting, Ehrlich moved back to the 8th Essex District with her husband Bruce and her two daughters, currently 25 and 28. In 2005 she earned a master's degree in Public Administration from Harvard Kennedy School. While at Harvard, Ehrlich served as president of the Kennedy School's Energy Caucus. She managed her own CPA practice for over 20 years. She is Jewish.

== Career ==
Lori Ehrlich worked for Stavisky, Shapiro and White, an accounting firm in Boston, from 1985 to 1988 as a staff accountant and tax specialist. From 1988 to 2008, Ehrlich was self-employed as a certified public accountant, focusing on business consulting and tax planning and preparation.

From 2005-2009, she served as President of The Environmental Integrity Project, a Washington, D.C.–based project of Rockefeller Family Fund. Ehrlich also co-founded two non-profit environmental and energy organizations, Healthlink, Inc. and Wenham Lake Watershed Association. Until her election in 2008, Ehrlich served as HealthLink president, media liaison, political strategist, and spokesperson. As a co-founder of Wenham Lake Watershed Association, she brokered the successful corporate cleanup of a major drinking water source for 80,000 residents on the North Shore of Boston.

Beginning January 31, 2022, she became the Federal Emergency Management Agency's Region 1 Director. Ehrlich will oversee emergency management operations for Connecticut, Maine, Massachusetts, New Hampshire, Rhode Island, and Vermont.

== Politics ==
In 2006, Ehrlich became involved in the Massachusetts gubernatorial campaign. She served on the Patrick/Murray Finance Committee as a fund raiser and on the policy team as an energy policy adviser. Ehrlich also served as a delegate for Patrick and Murray at the 2006 Massachusetts Democratic State Convention.

Ehrlich has been a vocal opponent of a new power plant being constructed in Salem.

== Election ==
In February 2008, Ehrlich competed for the seat vacated by Doug Petersen. Ehrlich beat Cesar Achilla of Swampscott in the Democratic Primary by 6214 votes to 2899. Ehrlich went on to compete in the March 4 Special Election against Republican John Blaisdell and Independent Mark Barry, both from Marblehead. Ehrlich won the Special Election with 56% of the vote, winning all precincts but one. Blaisdell finished second with 35% of the vote, and Barry in third with 9%.

Ehrlich was re-elected in November 2008 with 56.6% of the vote. Republican John Blaisdell came in 2nd with 34.6% and Independent Mark Barry finished 3rd with 8% of the vote. Ehrlich triumphed in all but one of the district's 15 precincts, the exception being Marblehead's 7th precinct where Blaisdell won by five votes.

For her third term, Ehrlich faced off with a Republican opponent Katherine Kozitza on November 2, 2010. Ehrlich won every precinct in the district with 62% of overall votes. She was sworn in on January 5, 2011, to begin her third term.

== See also ==
- 2019–2020 Massachusetts legislature
- 2021–2022 Massachusetts legislature

Political offices
Preceded by Douglas Petersen	State Representative Massachusetts; 2008 -	Succeeded by current
