= Ryan Hamilton =

Ryan Hamilton may refer to:

- Ryan Hamilton (comedian), American comedian and actor
- Ryan Hamilton (ice hockey) (born 1985), Canadian ice hockey player
- Ryan Hamilton (New Zealand politician), New Zealand politician
- Ryan Hamilton (rugby union) (born 1988), Canadian rugby union player
- Ryan Delbert Hamilton, guitarist and singer in American rock band People on Vacation
- Ryan Hamilton (Massachusetts politician), American politician representing Massachusetts House of Representatives' 15th Essex district since 2023
