= Adrianne Ramos =

American politician

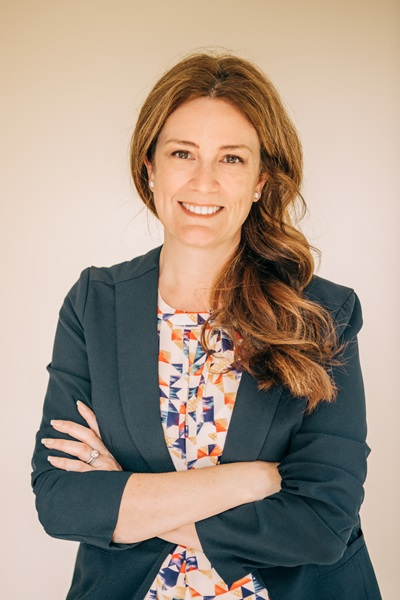

Member of the Massachusetts House of Representatives from the 14th Essex district
- Incumbent
- Assumed office January 4, 2023
- Preceded by: Christina Minicucci

Personal details
- Born: Adrianne Pusateri Ramos
- Party: Democratic
- Education: University of Maine (BS); New England Law Boston (JD)
- Occupation: Attorney

Adrianne Pusateri Ramos is an American politician and attorney who has served as a member of the Massachusetts House of Representatives from the 14th Essex district since 2023. She is a member of the Democratic Party.

== Biography ==
Ramos earned a Bachelor of Science from the University of Maine in 2001 and a Juris Doctor from New England Law Boston in 2007. She became an attorney.

In 2022, Ramos won election to the Massachusetts House of Representatives, representing the 14th Essex district.
