= Vincent Lozzi =

American politician (1932–2026)

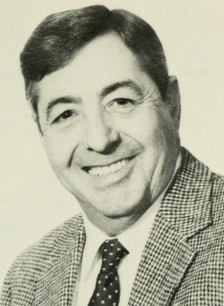

Member of the Massachusetts House of Representatives from the 10th Essex district
- In office 1985–1991
- Preceded by: Timothy A. Bassett
- Succeeded by: Jeffery Hayward

Personal details
- Born: January 28, 1932 Everett, Massachusetts, U.S.
- Died: January 11, 2026 (aged 93)
- Resting place: St. Joseph’s Cemetery, Lynn MA
- Party: Democratic

Vincent J. Lozzi (January 28, 1932 – January 11, 2026) was an American politician who served in the Massachusetts House of Representatives.

== Early life ==
Lozzi was born on January 28, 1932, in Everett, Massachusetts. He attended public schools in Everett and graduated from Merrimack College's School of Industrial Relations in 1962.

== Political career ==
Lozzi was a member of the Lynn City Council from 1975 to 1981. From 1981 to 1983, he was a Lynn Housing Commissioner. He returned to the City Council in 1983 and remained there until 1985.

From 1985 to 1991, Lozzi represented the 10th Essex District in the Massachusetts House of Representatives. He lost to Jeffery Hayward in the 1990 Democratic primary.

== Later life and death ==
Lozzi later resided in Massachusetts. His son, Wayne Lozzi, was a city councilor in Lynn. His son Daniel Lozzi is a retired District Chief of the Lynn Fire Department.

Lozzi died on January 11, 2026, at the age of 93.
