= Forrester Clark =

American investment banker and politician

Forrester "Tim" Clark
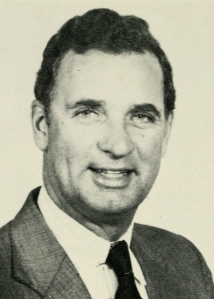

Member of the Massachusetts House of Representatives from the 4th Essex District
- In office 1997–1999
- Preceded by: James Colt
- Succeeded by: Bradford Hill
- In office 1979–1995
- Preceded by: Kevin M. Burke
- Succeeded by: James Colt

Personal details
- Born: November 30, 1934 (age 91) Boston, Massachusetts
- Party: Republican
- Education: Harvard Business School
- Occupation: Investment Banker; Politician

Forrester Andrew "Tim" Clark, Jr. (born November 30, 1934, in Boston, Massachusetts) is an American investment banker and politician who represented the 4th Essex District in the Massachusetts House of Representatives from 1979 to 1995 and again from 1997 to 1999. Prior to serving in the House, Clark was a member of the Hamilton, Massachusetts Board of Selectmen.

He was the Republican nominee for Massachusetts State Auditor in 1994, but lost in the general election to A. Joseph DeNucci.

In 1995, Clark was succeeded in the 4th Essex District his friend James Colt. In 1996, Clark, who was upset over the fact Colt had gone on vacation during the 1995 budget battle, challenged Colt for the Republican nomination. Clark defeated Colt by 58 votes. Two years later Clark was defeated in the Republican primary by Ipswich selectman Bradford Hill.

Party political offices
Preceded by Douglas J. Murray	Republican nominee for Auditor of Massachusetts; 1994	Succeeded by Michael Duffy
