= Donna Cuomo =

American politician

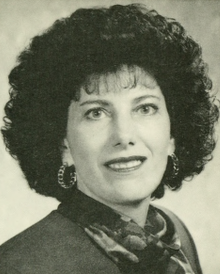

Member of the Massachusetts House of Representatives from the 14th Essex district
- In office 1993–1999
- Preceded by: Joseph N. Hermann
- Succeeded by: David Torrisi

Personal details
- Born: March 19, 1947 (age 79) Lawrence, Massachusetts
- Party: Republican
- Education: Lowell State College; Salem State University
- Occupation: Violence Prevention Educator/Victim Advocate; Politician

Donna Fournier Cuomo (born March 19, 1947, in Lawrence, Massachusetts) is an American politician who represented the 14th Essex district in the Massachusetts House of Representatives from 1993 to 1999. She later served as the deputy director of the Department of Public Safety's programs division.

Cuomo was briefly a Republican candidate for Lieutenant Governor in 2002. She announced her candidacy on April 2, 2002 and dropped out of the race the next day.

== Personal life ==
Cuomo is the sister of Joseph Fournier, who was murdered by Willie Horton and two other men in 1974. She appeared in an anti-Michael Dukakis ad during the 1988 presidential election.

Cuomo escaped from the World Trade Center during the September 11 attacks.
