= Massachusetts House of Representatives' 10th Essex district =

American legislative district

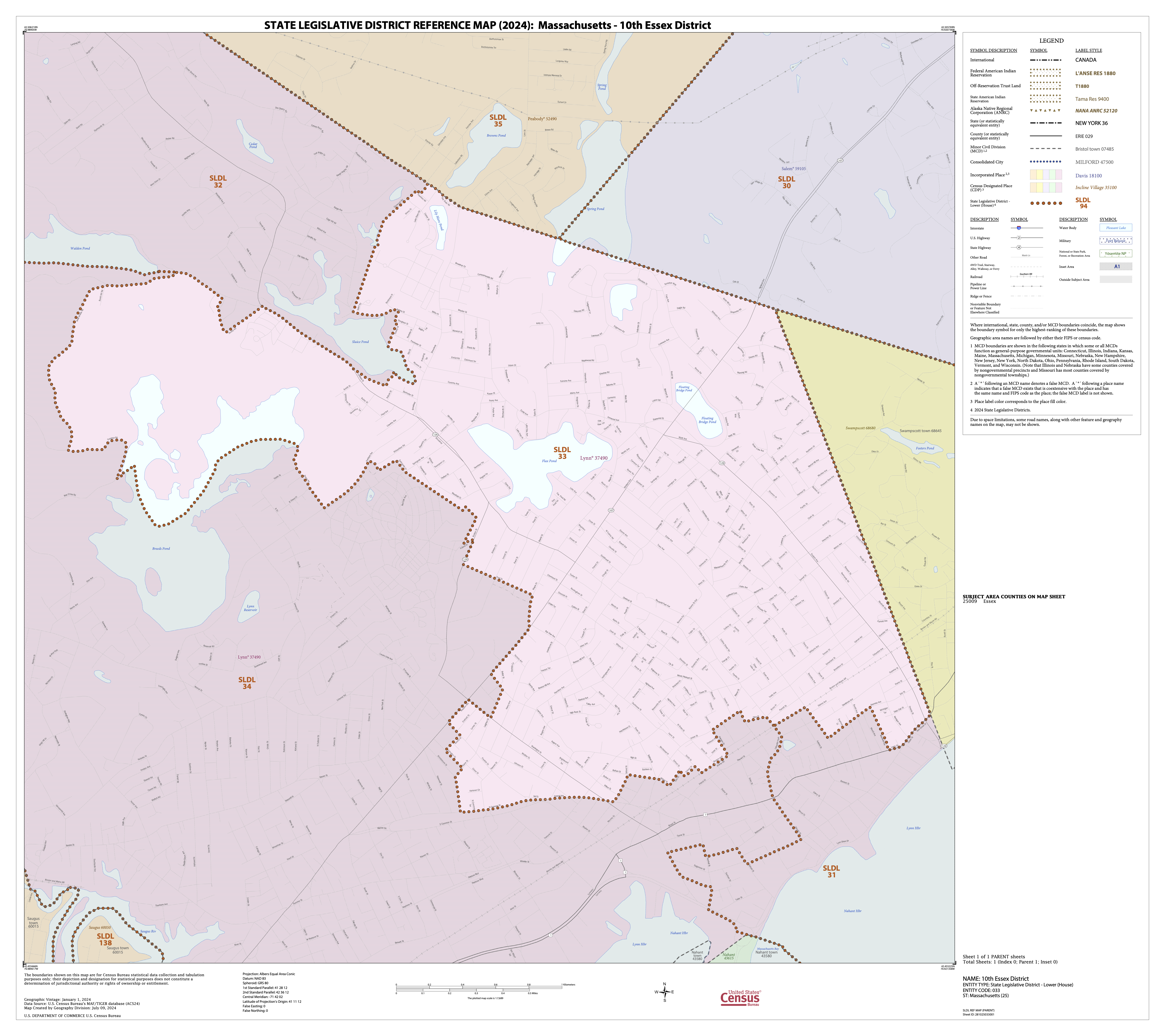
Map of Massachusetts House of Representatives' 10th Essex district, based on the 2020 United States census.

Massachusetts House of Representatives' 10th Essex district is one of 160 districts included in the lower house of the Massachusetts General Court. It covers part of the city of Lynn in Essex County. Democrat Dan Cahill of Lynn has represented the district since 2016.

The current district geographic boundary overlaps with that of the Massachusetts Senate's 3rd Essex district.

== Representatives ==
- William Hardy, circa 1858
- A. J. French, circa 1859
- William Howe Burnham, circa 1888
- George Dennis, circa 1888
- Cyrus Story, circa 1888
- Walter Thomas Creese, circa 1920
- Frederick Willis, circa 1945
- Philip J. Durkin, 1949–1957
- John E. Murphy, circa 1951
- Norris W. Harris, circa 1975
- Timothy A. Bassett
- Vincent Lozzi
- Jeffery Hayward
- Robert Fennell
- Daniel H. Cahill, 2016–current

== Former locales ==
The district previously covered:

- Beverly, circa 1872
- Hamilton, circa 1872
- Manchester, circa 1872

== See also ==
- List of Massachusetts House of Representatives elections
- Other Essex County districts of the Massachusetts House of Representatives: 1st, 2nd, 3rd, 4th, 5th, 6th, 7th, 8th, 9th, 11th, 12th, 13th, 14th, 15th, 16th, 17th, 18th
- Essex County districts of the Massachusett Senate: 1st, 2nd, 3rd; 1st Essex and Middlesex; 2nd Essex and Middlesex
- List of Massachusetts General Courts
- List of former districts of the Massachusetts House of Representatives

== Images ==
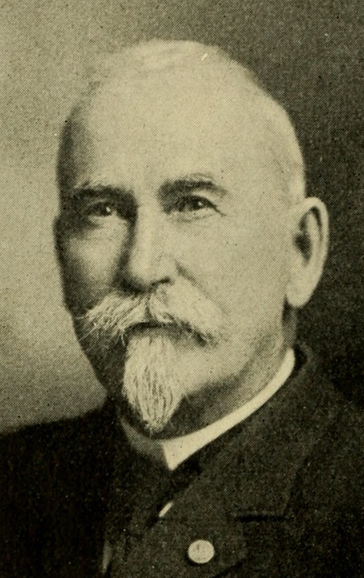
John Cook

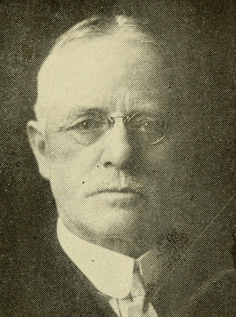
George Morse

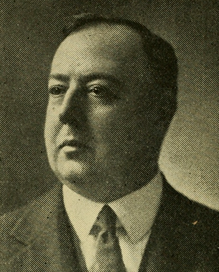
Robert Burns Walsh

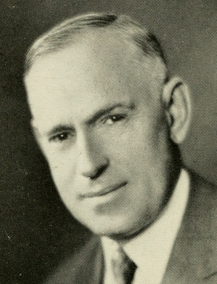
Fred Hutchinson

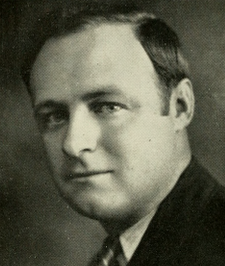
James McElroy

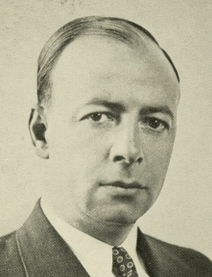
William Landergan

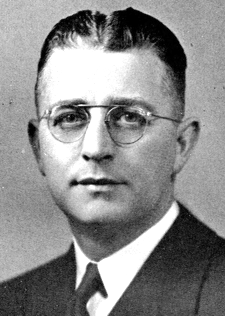
Frederick Willis

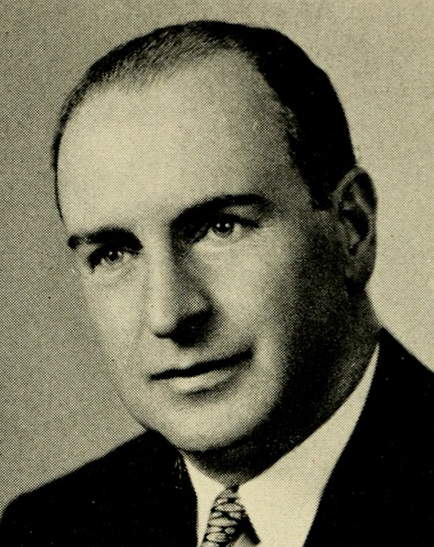
John E. Murphy

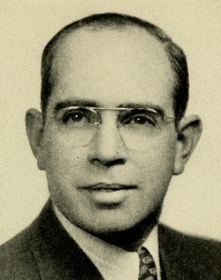
Philip Durkin

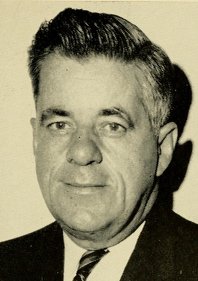
T. Harold Gayron

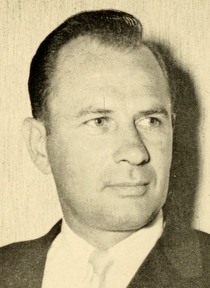
Thomas McGee

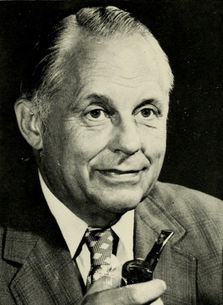
Norris Harris

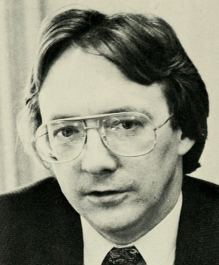
Timothy Bassett

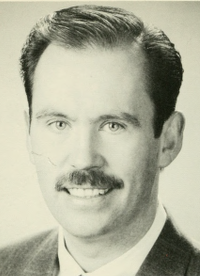
Robert Fennell
