= Joseph N. Hermann =

American politician

Joseph Hermann
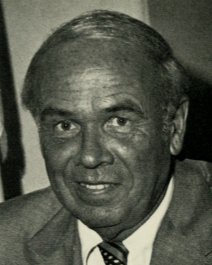

Member of the Massachusetts House of Representatives from the 14th Essex District
- In office 1979 – May 20, 1993
- Preceded by: Bernard D. Flynn
- Succeeded by: Donna Cuomo

Member of the Massachusetts House of Representatives from the 26th Essex District
- In office 1977–1979
- Preceded by: James Hurrell
- Succeeded by: District Abolished

Personal details
- Born: June 8, 1924 Boston, Massachusetts (Dorchester)
- Died: May 20, 1993 (aged 68) North Andover, Massachusetts
- Party: Democratic
- Education: Burdett College
- Occupation: Real Estate Appraiser; Politician

Joseph N. Hermann (June 8, 1924 in Boston, Massachusetts – May 20, 1993 in North Andover, Massachusetts) was an American politician who was a member of the Massachusetts House of Representatives from 1977 until his death on May 20, 1993.
