= Massachusetts House of Representatives' 17th Essex district =

American legislative district

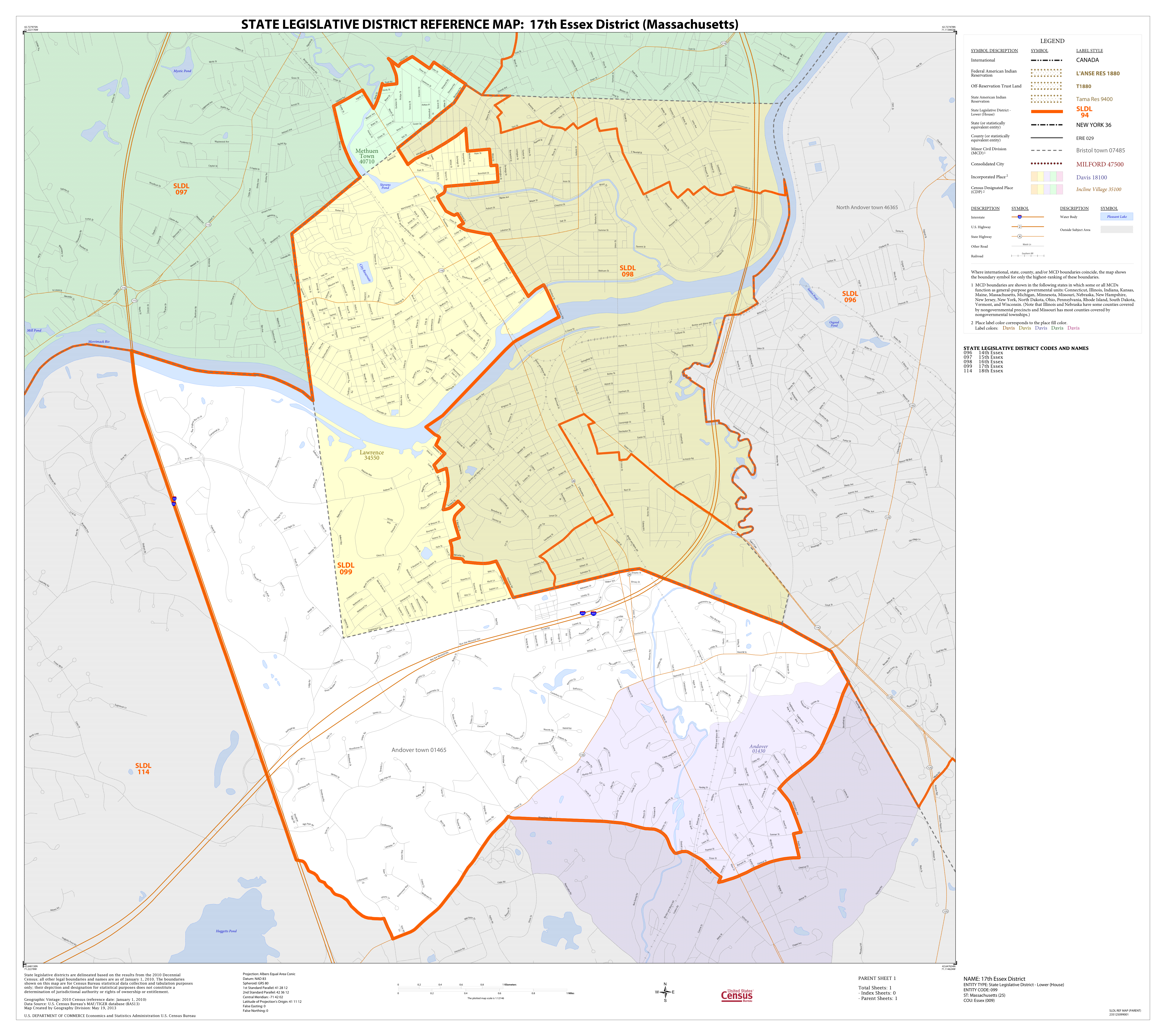
Map of Massachusetts House of Representatives' 17th Essex district, based on the 2010 United States census.

Massachusetts House of Representatives' 17th Essex district in the United States is one of 160 legislative districts included in the lower house of the Massachusetts General Court. It covers part of Essex County. Democrat Frank Moran of Lawrence has represented the district since 2013. Candidates for this district seat in the 2020 Massachusetts general election include Marianela Rivera.

== Locales represented ==
The district includes the following localities:

- part of Andover
- part of Lawrence
- part of Methuen

The current district geographic boundary overlaps with those of the Massachusetts Senate's 1st Essex and 2nd Essex and Middlesex districts.

=== Former locale ===
The district previously covered part of Lynn, circa 1872.

== Representatives ==
- Benj. Edwards Jr., circa 1858
- Gorham P. Sargent, circa 1859
- Daniel P. Stimpson, circa 1888
- Chauncey Pepin, circa 1920
- A. David Rodham, circa 1975
- Susan Tucker, circa 1983–1991
- Gary Coon
- Barry Finegold, 1997–2011
- Paul Adams, 2011–2013
- Frank A. Moran, 2013–current

== See also ==
- List of Massachusetts House of Representatives elections
- Other Essex County districts of the Massachusetts House of Representatives: 1st, 2nd, 3rd, 4th, 5th, 6th, 7th, 8th, 9th, 10th, 11th, 12th, 13th, 14th, 15th, 16th, 18th
- Essex County districts of the Massachusett Senate: 1st, 2nd, 3rd; 1st Essex and Middlesex; 2nd Essex and Middlesex
- List of Massachusetts General Courts
- List of former districts of the Massachusetts House of Representatives

== Images ==
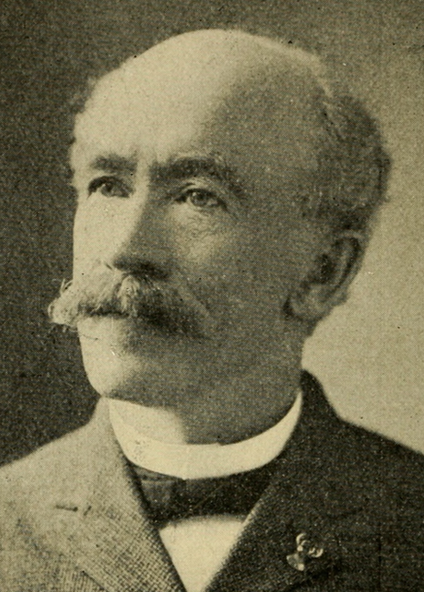
Thomas Davis

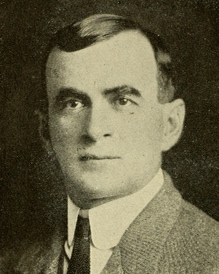
Chauncey Pepin

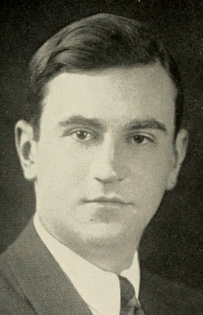
Frederick Tarr

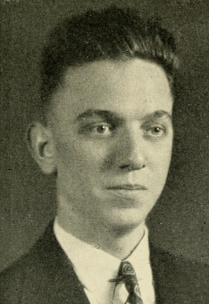
Richard Hull

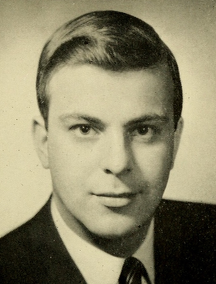
Aaron Shinberg

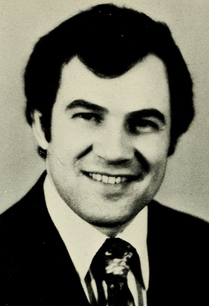
A. David Rodham

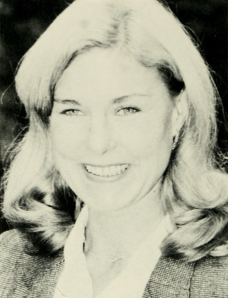
Susan Tucker

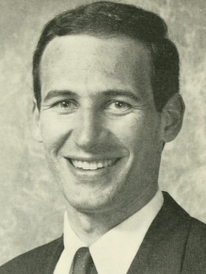
Gary Coon

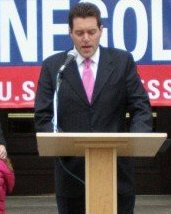
Barry Finegold
