= Massachusetts Senate's 2nd Essex district =

American legislative district

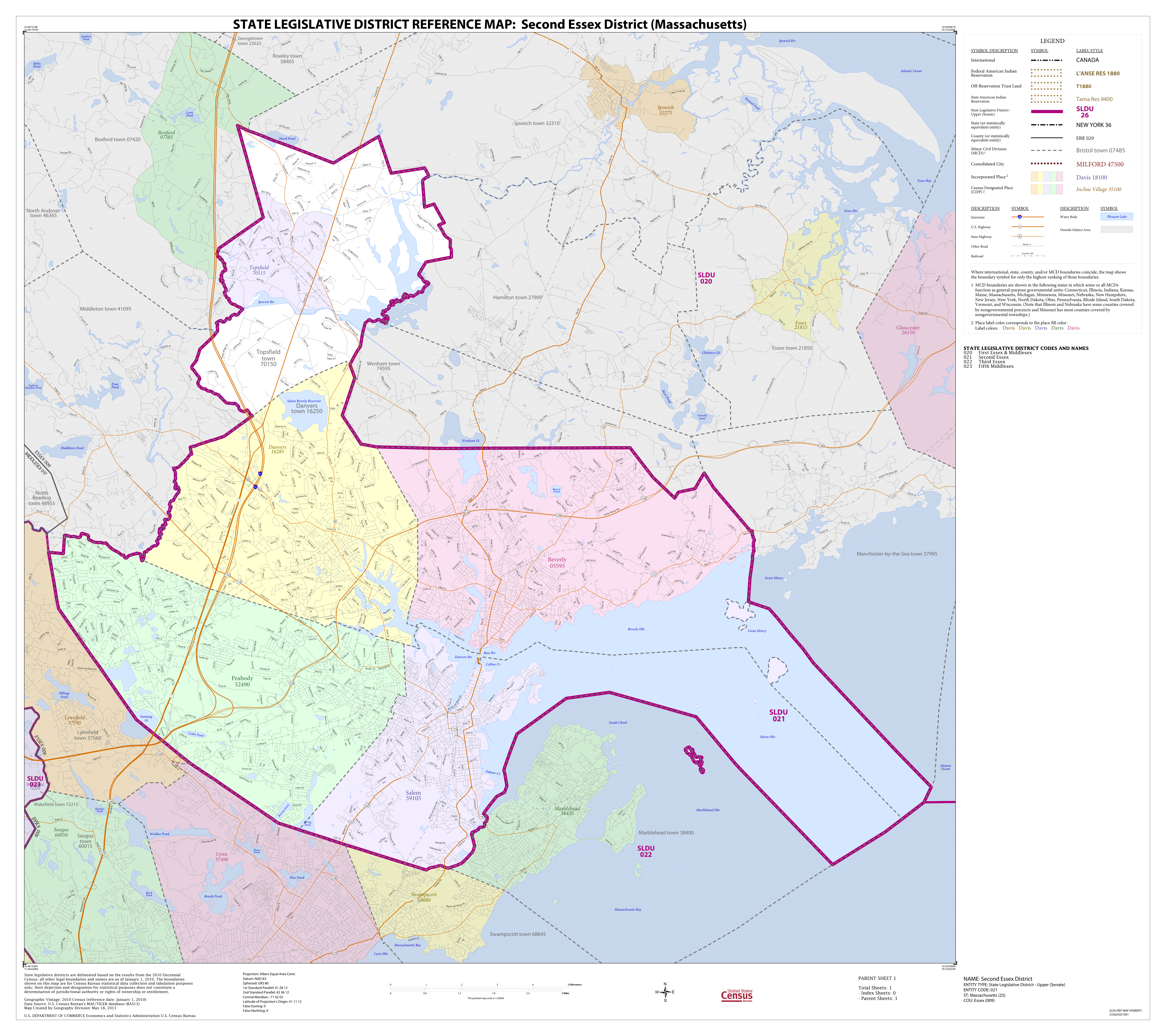
Map of Massachusetts Senate's 2nd Essex district, based on the 2010 United States census.

Massachusetts Senate's 2nd Essex district in the United States is one of 40 legislative districts of the Massachusetts Senate. It covers portions of Essex county. Democrat Joan Lovely of Salem has represented the district since 2013.

== Towns represented ==
The district includes the following localities:

- Beverly
- Danvers
- Peabody
- Salem
- Topsfield

The current district geographic boundary overlaps with those of the Massachusetts House of Representatives' 4th Essex, 6th Essex, 7th Essex, 12th Essex, and 13th Essex districts.

=== Former locales ===
The district previously covered the following:

- Hamilton, c. 1860s
- Middleton, c. 1860s
- South Danvers, c. 1860s
- Wenham, c. 1860s

== List of senators ==
- J. B. F. Osgood, c. 1859
- James J. H. Gregory, 1876–1877
- Francis T. Berry, c. 1894
- E. Howard Perley
- Thomas Walter Creese
- Arthur S. Adams, c. 1911
- Albert Pierce, c. 1935
- J. Elmer Callahan, c. 1945

Senator	Party	Years	Legis.	Electoral history	District towns
Christopher H. Phillips	Republican	1949– 1953	156th 157th 158th	Elected in 1948. Re-elected in 1950. Re-elected in 1952. Resigned to join U.S. State Department.	
C. Henry Glovsky	Republican	1953– 1957	158th 159th	Elected in 1953. Re-elected in 1954.	
Herbert Tuckerman	Republican	1957 – 1959	160th	Elected in 1956. Ran for Lt. Governor in 1958.	
Kevin B. Harrington	Democratic	1959 – 1978	161st 162nd 163rd 164th 165th 166th 167th 168th 169th 170th	Elected in 1958. Re-elected in 1960. Re-elected in 1962. Re-elected in 1964. Re-elected in 1966. Re-elected in 1968. Re-elected in 1970. Re-elected in 1972. Re-elected in 1974. Re-elected in 1976. Resigned.	
John G. King	Democratic	1979 – 1983	171st 172nd	Elected in 1978. Re-elected in 1980. Retired.	
Frederick Berry	Democratic	1983– January 2, 2013	173rd 174th 175th 176th 177th 178th 179th 180th 181st 182nd 183rd 184th 185th 186th 187th	Elected in 1982. Re-elected in 1984. Re-elected in 1986. Re-elected in 1988. Re-elected in 1990. Re-elected in 1992. Re-elected in 1994. Re-elected in 1996. Re-elected in 1998. Re-elected in 2000. Re-elected in 2002. Re-elected in 2004. Re-elected in 2006. Re-elected in 2008. Re-elected in 2012. Retired.	
Joan Lovely	Democratic	January 2, 2013–	188th 189th 190th 191st 192nd	Elected in 2012. Re-elected in 2014. Re-elected in 2016. Re-elected in 2018. Re-elected in 2020.	

== Images ==
=== Portraits of legislators ===
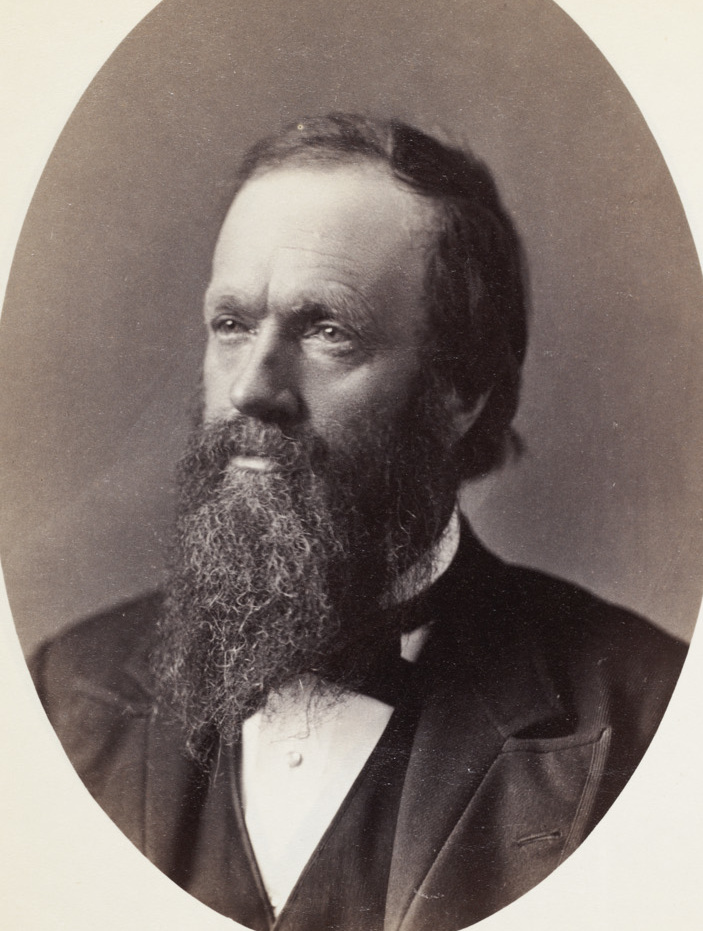
James J. H. Gregory

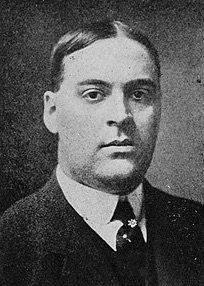
E. Howard Perley

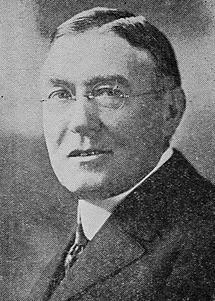
Thomas Walter Creese

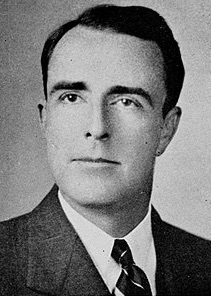
J. Elmer Callahan

== See also ==
- List of Massachusetts Senate elections
- List of Massachusetts General Courts
- List of former districts of the Massachusetts Senate
- Other Essex County districts of the Massachusett Senate: 1st, 3rd; 1st Essex and Middlesex; 2nd Essex and Middlesex
- Essex County districts of the Massachusetts House of Representatives: 1st, 2nd, 3rd, 4th, 5th, 6th, 7th, 8th, 9th, 10th, 11th, 12th, 13th, 14th, 15th, 16th, 17th, 18th
