= Paul Adams (Massachusetts politician) =

American politician

Member of the Massachusetts House of Representatives from the 17th Essex District
- In office 2011–2013
- Preceded by: Barry Finegold
- Succeeded by: Frank A. Moran

Personal details
- Party: Republican
- Education: Suffolk University
- Occupation: Policy Advisor; Politician
- Website: votepauladams.com

Jared Paul Adams is an American politician who represented the 17th Essex district in the Massachusetts House of Representatives from 2011 to 2013. Adams is a member of the Republican Party.

== Early life and career ==
Adams grew up in Andover, Massachusetts, and is the third of five children of Steven and Lynette Adams. He attended Andover schools and graduated from Andover High School in 2000, where he played on the tennis team all four years. He trained in classical piano for a decade and studied at the Oberlin College Conservatory of Music during high school. Adams received the Eagle Scout award from the Boy Scouts of America in 1999 and his final project involved rejuvenating the wildlife area and the trails surrounding Haggetts Pond, the town of Andover water supply. He also helped build several of the original trails through the Nat Smith AVIS conservation property, and continues to assist with their preservation. He went on to graduate with honors from Suffolk University with a B.S. in International Relations and Economics.

Adams has been involved with dozens of local, state and national campaigns from a young age, including Mitt Romney and Scott Brown. Since 2008, has represented the Second Essex & Middlesex State Senatorial District on the Massachusetts Republican State Committee. The district includes the towns of Andover, Tewksbury and the City of Lawrence. Adams' responsibilities on the Committee involve recruiting and advising candidates at all levels of public office as well as helping craft the state party's overall policy platform.

Adams worked in South America for two years as an LDS missionary. He continued this focus throughout his undergraduate studies and also spent two summers working with the Washington, DC–based Council on Hemispheric Affairs, where he was responsible for publishing policy positions in the U.S. and South America. His work involved many issues, including: Colombia's decades-old civil war, the joint drug control policy between the U.S. and Colombia, and the contentious post-Cold War Surface to Air Missile Crisis in Nicaragua and Costa Rica. Adams is fluent in Portuguese and Spanish.

Before running for State Representative, Adams spent three years as a public policy consultant and advisor.
