= Arthur Broadhurst =

American politician

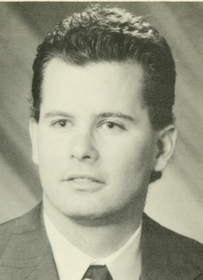

Member of the Massachusetts House of Representatives from the 15th Essex district
- In office 1993–2007
- Preceded by: Larry Giordano
- Succeeded by: Linda Dean Campbell

Personal details
- Born: September 28, 1964 (age 61) Methuen, Massachusetts
- Party: Democratic
- Education: Salem State College; Massachusetts School of Law
- Occupation: Politician; Attorney

Arthur J. Broadhurst (born September 28, 1964) is an American politician who represented the 15th Essex district in the Massachusetts House of Representatives from 1993 to 2007. He was a candidate for Essex County Register of Deeds in 2006, but lost in the Democratic primary.
