= Daniel Cahill =

American politician

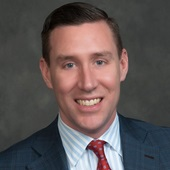

Member of the Massachusetts House of Representatives from the 10th Essex district
- Incumbent
- Assumed office May 18, 2016
- Preceded by: Robert Fennell

Personal details
- Party: Democratic
- Education: Northeastern University (BS); Suffolk University (MPS); Suffolk Law (JD)

Daniel "Dan" Cahill is an American attorney and politician who serves as a member of the Massachusetts House of Representatives for the 10th Essex district. A member of the Democratic Party, his district covers part of the city of Lynn.

Cahill was first elected in a special election in 2016 after the incumbent, Robert Fennell, resigned to serve as deputy director of the Lynn Water and Sewer Commission. As of 2024, Cahill has not faced a challenger in either a primary or general election.

Cahill began his career as an assistant district attorney in Essex County. Prior to his election to the legislature, he served on the Lynn School Committee and Lynn City Council.

== See also ==
- 2019–2020 Massachusetts legislature
- 2021–2022 Massachusetts legislature
