= Estela Reyes =

American politician

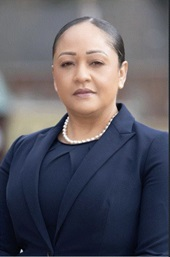

Member of the Massachusetts House of Representatives from the 4th Essex district
- Incumbent
- Assumed office January 4, 2023
- Preceded by: Jamie Belsito

Personal details
- Born: Santiago de los Caballeros, Dominican Republic
- Party: Democratic

Estela Reyes is an American politician who is a member of the Massachusetts House of Representatives for the 4th Essex district. Elected in November 2022, assumed office on January 4, 2023.

== Early life ==
Reyes moved with her family from Santiago de los Caballeros to Lawrence, Massachusetts.

== Career ==
Reyes has served as a member of the Lawrence City Council since 2012, including as vice president. She was also a member of the Community Development Advisory Board and advised the mayor on community development policy. She was elected to the Massachusetts House of Representatives in November 2022.
