= Massachusetts House of Representatives' 8th Essex district =

American legislative district

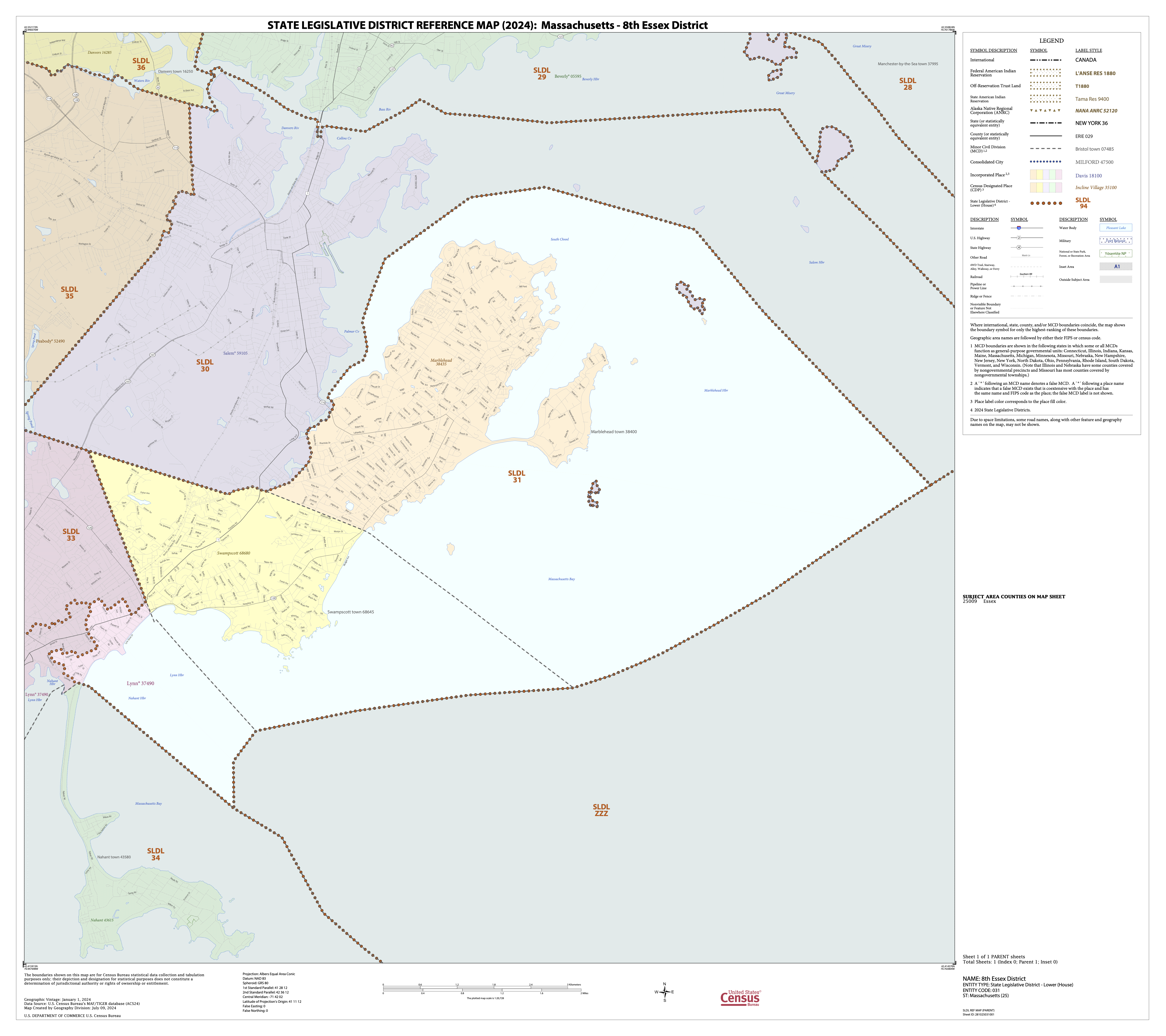
Map of Massachusetts House of Representatives' 8th Essex district, based on the 2020 United States census.

Massachusetts House of Representatives' 8th Essex district is one of 160 districts included in the lower house of the Massachusetts General Court. It covers the towns of Marblehead and Swampscott and part of the city of Lynn in Essex County. Democrat Jenny Armini of Marblehead has represented the district since 2023.

== Towns represented ==
The district includes the following localities:

- part of Lynn
- Marblehead
- Swampscott

The current district geographic boundary overlaps with that of the Massachusetts Senate's 3rd Essex district.

=== Former locales ===
The district previously covered:

- Essex, circa 1872
- Gloucester, circa 1872

== Representatives ==
- James H. Duncan, circa 1858
- Nathan S. Kimball, circa 1858–1859
- James Russell, circa 1859
- Luther Dame, circa 1888
- Edward P. Shaw, circa 1888
- James P. Donnelly, circa 1920
- Michael J. Batal, circa 1951
- Henry J. O'Donnell III, circa 1975
- Lawrence Alexander, 1979–1991
- Douglas W. Petersen, 1991–2007
- Lori Ehrlich, 2009–2023
- Jenny Armini, 2023–present

== See also ==
- List of Massachusetts House of Representatives elections
- Other Essex County districts of the Massachusetts House of Representatives: 1st, 2nd, 3rd, 4th, 5th, 6th, 7th, 9th, 10th, 11th, 12th, 13th, 14th, 15th, 16th, 17th, 18th
- Essex County districts of the Massachusett Senate: 1st, 2nd, 3rd; 1st Essex and Middlesex; 2nd Essex and Middlesex
- List of Massachusetts General Courts
- List of former districts of the Massachusetts House of Representatives

== Images ==
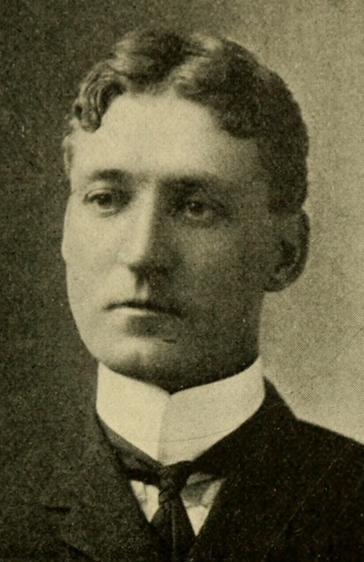
William Graham

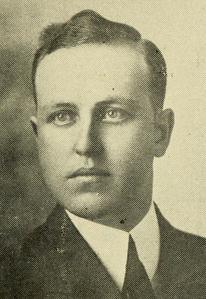
Michael Flanagan

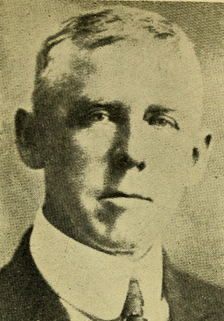
David Daley

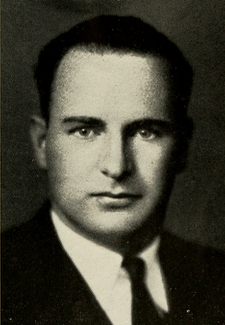
John E. Murphy

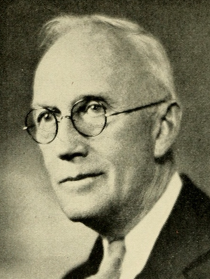
Oscar Perkins

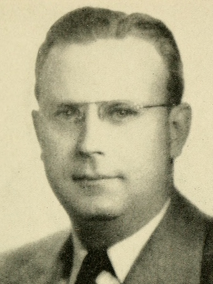
Rene Bernardin

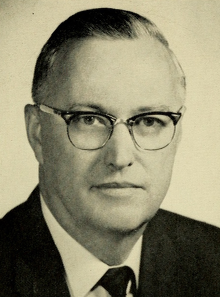
Thomas Newth

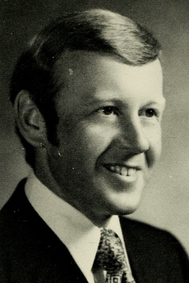
Henry O'Donnell

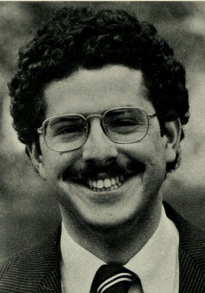
Lawrence Alexander

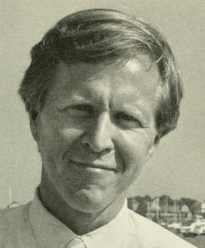
Douglas Petersen
