= Linda Dean Campbell =

American politician

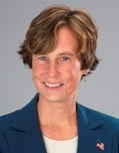

Member of the Massachusetts House of Representatives from the 15th Essex district
- In office January 3, 2007 – January 4, 2023
- Preceded by: Arthur Broadhurst
- Succeeded by: Ryan Hamilton

Personal details
- Party: Democratic
- Education: University of Massachusetts Amherst (BA); University of Southern California (MA)

Linda Dean Campbell is an American politician who served as a member of the Massachusetts House of Representatives for the 15th Essex district from 2007 to 2023. A resident of Methuen, Campbell was previously a member of the city council.

== Early life and career ==
Campbell graduated from St. Mary's High School in Lawrence, Massachusetts. She earned a Bachelor of Arts degree from the University of Massachusetts Amherst and a master's degree in international relations from the University of Southern California.

Prior to her election to the House of Representatives, Campbell worked as a nurses' aid at the Lawrence General Hospital.

From 1979 to 1988, Campbell was a member of the United States Army and served as Chief of Intelligence Processing for the Army's component of the Rapid Deployment Force, XVIIIth Airborne Corps, at Fort Bragg. During her military career, Campbell was a paratrooper with over thirty jumps from military aircraft. During this time she also was stationed in Germany and held positions in personnel and intelligence.

From 1988 to 1990, Campbell was a high school history and English teacher in North Carolina and also taught an undergraduate course in international relations at Methodist College.

== Political career ==
In 1999, Campbell was elected to the Methuen City Council, where she served for three terms. She later ran for the Massachusetts House of Representatives in 2006 following the retirement of incumbent Arthur Broadhurst, who retired to run for Essex County Register of Deeds.

In the 2006 campaign, Campbell won the Democratic primary with 32.2% of the vote against three other candidates and defeated Republican Robert A. Andrew and independent candidate Kenneth A. Henrick in the general election, winning 61% of the vote.

In 2022, Campbell announced she would not run for re-election after eight terms. She left office in January 2023.

== See also ==
- 2019–2020 Massachusetts legislature
- 2021–2022 Massachusetts legislature
