= Jeffery Hayward =

American politician

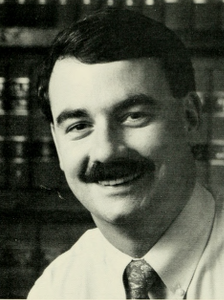

Member of the Massachusetts House of Representatives from the 10th Essex District
- In office 1991–1995
- Preceded by: Vincent Lozzi
- Succeeded by: Robert Fennell

Personal details
- Born: April 3, 1960 (age 66) Lynn, Massachusetts
- Party: Democratic
- Education: Saint Anselm College
- Occupation: Politician

Jeffery J. Hayward (born April 3, 1960 in Lynn, Massachusetts) is an American politician who represented the 10th Essex district in the Massachusetts House of Representatives from 1991–1995. He was a candidate for the United States House of Representatives seat in Massachusetts's 6th congressional district in 1994, but lost in the Democratic primary to John F. Tierney by 538 votes.

From 1986–1991 he was the Chief of Staff to Lynn Mayor Albert V. DiVirgilio.
