= Timothy A. Bassett =

American politician

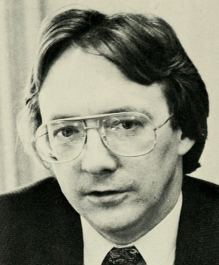

Treasurer of Essex County, Massachusetts
- In office 1997–1998
- Preceded by: Katherine O'Leary
- Succeeded by: Position abolished

Member of the Massachusetts House of Representatives
- In office 1973–1985
- Preceded by: James J. Carrigan
- Succeeded by: Vincent Lozzi

Personal details
- Born: December 16, 1947 (age 78) Lynn, Massachusetts
- Party: Democratic
- Education: Salem State College; University of New Hampshire; Harvard University

Timothy A. Bassett is an American politician who served in the Massachusetts House of Representatives.

== Early life ==
Bassett was born on December 16, 1947, in Lynn, Massachusetts. He earned a B.S. degree from Salem State College, a Master's degree in Political Science from the University of New Hampshire, and a Master of Public Administration degree from Harvard University.

== Political career ==
From 1973 to 1985, Bassett was a member of the Massachusetts House of Representatives. He resigned from the House during his final term after he was appointed executive director of the Government Land Bank. In 1996 he was elected Treasurer of Essex County.

== Essex Regional Retirement Board ==
In 1998, the position of Essex County Treasurer was abolished and Bassett became Chairman and Executive Director of the Essex Regional Retirement Board. He also worked as a lobbyist. His clients included the Massachusetts Coalition of Police, the New England Gas Workers Alliances, and the International Brotherhood of Electrical Workers.

In February 2010, the Office of Campaign and Political Finance, ordered Bassett to pay $5,000 in restitution to the Essex county retirement system for using their newsletter for political purposes. In April 2010 he was fired. Massachusetts Attorney General Martha Coakley referred Bassett's case to the Ethics Commission, which found that he had illegally used public time and facilities to further his lobbying business while he was running the Essex Regional Retirement Board. He was fined $10,000, one of the largest fines ever levied by the Ethics Commission.

== See also ==
- Massachusetts House of Representatives' 10th Essex district
