= Susan Tucker (politician) =

American politician (1944–2023)

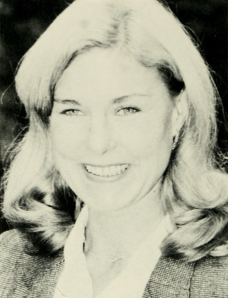
- Tucker in 1983

Member of the Massachusetts Senate from the Second Essex and Middlesex district
- In office 1999–2011
- Preceded by: John D. O'Brien
- Succeeded by: Barry Finegold

Member of the Massachusetts House of Representatives from the 17th Essex district
- In office 1983–1991
- Preceded by: Gerald M. Cohen
- Succeeded by: Gary Coon

Personal details
- Born: November 7, 1944 Winfield, Kansas
- Died: November 20, 2023 (aged 79)
- Party: Democratic
- Education: Michigan State University

Susan C. Tucker (November 7, 1944 – November 20, 2023) was a Massachusetts Democratic State Senator and State Representative from Andover. She served in the Massachusetts House of Representatives from 1982 to 1992 and in the Massachusetts Senate from 1999 to 2011.

== Early life ==
Tucker was born in Winfield, Kansas, graduated from Battle Creek Central High School in Battle Creek, Michigan, and received a bachelor's degree from Michigan State University. She was a teacher in the Lexington and Andover Public Schools prior to entering politics.

== Political career ==
Tucker served in the Massachusetts House of Representatives from 1983 to 1991, in the Senate from 1999 to 2011, representing the district of Second Essex and Middlesex which includes Lawrence and Andover in Essex County and Dracut and Tewksbury in Middlesex County. She was a supporter of numerous housing initiatives and served as the chair of the Joint Committee on Housing during her final term in the Senate. She was also a vocal opponent of casino gambling in Massachusetts.

On April 11, 2014, Tucker endorsed Don Berwick for Governor of Massachusetts.

== Death ==
Tucker died on November 20, 2023. She was survived by her husband of 57 years, Mike Tucker, and predeceased by her two sons.
