= Massachusetts House of Representatives' 15th Essex district =

American legislative district

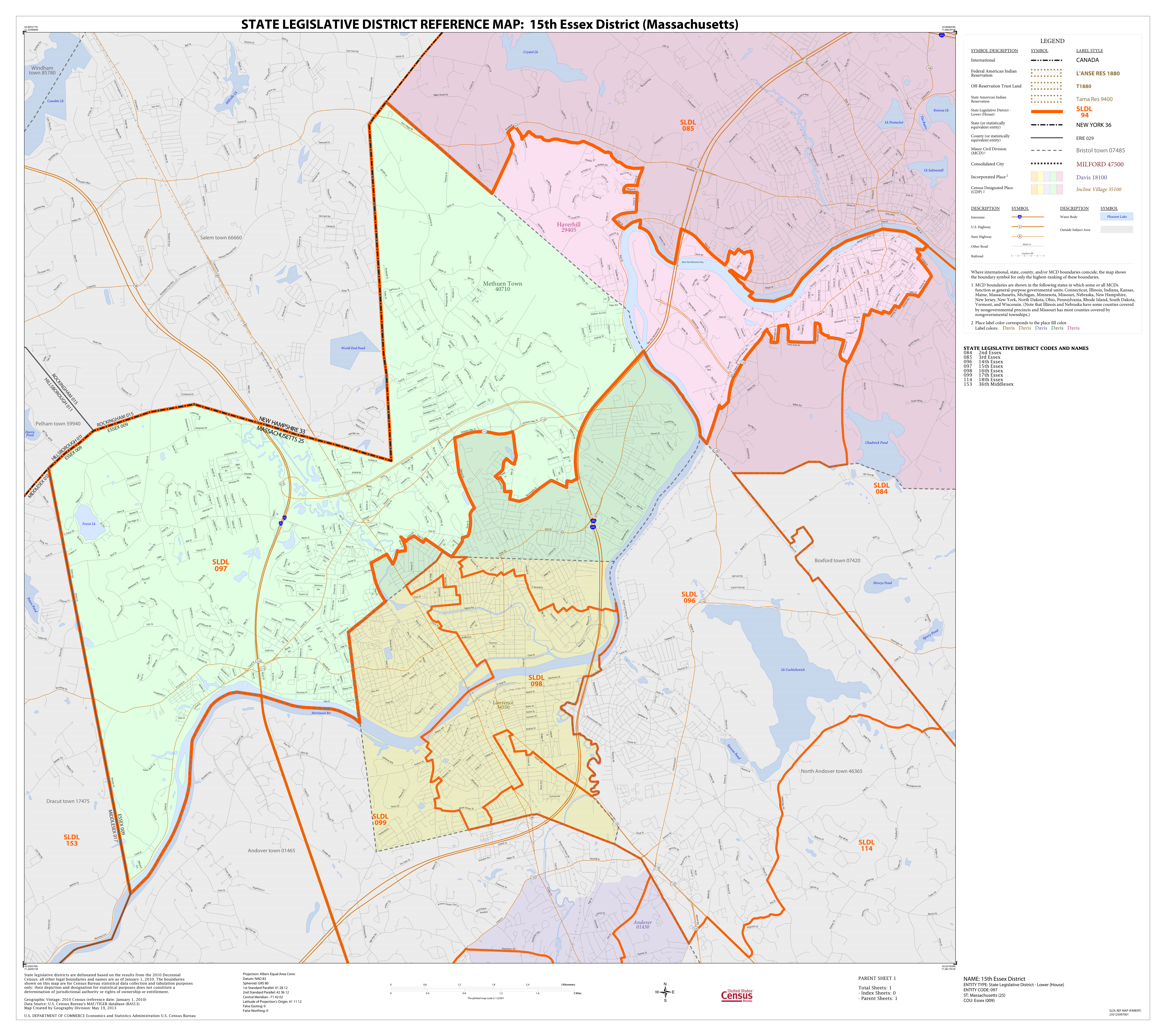
Map of Massachusetts House of Representatives' 15th Essex district, based on the 2010 United States census.

Massachusetts House of Representatives' 15th Essex district in the United States is one of 160 legislative districts included in the lower house of the Massachusetts General Court. It covers part of Essex County. Democrat Ryan Hamilton of Methuen has represented the district since 2023.

== Locales represented ==
The district includes the following localities:

- part of Haverhill
- part of Methuen

The current district geographic boundary overlaps with that of the Massachusetts Senate's 1st Essex district.

=== Former locales ===
The district previously covered:

- Marblehead, circa 1872
- part of Salem, circa 1872

== Representatives ==
Member	Party	Years	Legis.	Electoral history	District towns
Henry Cabot Lodge Jr.	Republican	1933 – 1937	148th 149th	Elected in 1932. Re-elected in 1934. Elected to United States Senate in 1936.	
Russell P. Brown	Republican	1937 – 1947	150th 151st 152nd 153rd 154th	Elected in 1936. Re-elected in 1938. Re-elected in 1940. Re-elected in 1942. Re-elected in 1944.	
Andrew E. Faulkner	Republican	1947 – November 15, 1950	155th 156th	Elected in 1946. Re-elected in 1948. Died November 15, 1950.	
Vacant		November 15, 1950 – 1951	156th		
C. Henry Glovsky	Republican	1950 – 1953	156th 157th	Elected in 1950. Elected to State Senate in 1952.	
Arthur Broadhurst	Democratic	1993 – 2007	179th 180th 181st 182nd 183rd 184th 185th	Elected in 1992. Re-elected in 1994. Re-elected in 1996. Re-elected in 1998. Re-elected in 2000. Re-elected in 2002. Re-elected in 2004. Ran for Essex County Register of Deeds.	
Linda Dean Campbell	Democratic	2007 –	186th 187th 188th 189th 190th 191st 191st 192nd	Elected in 2006. Re-elected in 2008. Re-elected in 2010. Re-elected in 2012. Re-elected in 2014. Re-elected in 2016. Re-elected in 2018. Re-elected in 2020.	
Linda Dean Campbell	Democratic	2007 –	186th 187th 188th 189th 190th 191st 191st 192nd	Elected in 2006. Re-elected in 2008. Re-elected in 2010. Re-elected in 2012. Re-elected in 2014. Re-elected in 2016. Re-elected in 2018. Re-elected in 2020.	2013–: Parts of Haverhill and Methuen

- George W. Butters, circa 1858–1859
- Charles Henry Symonds, circa 1888
- James D. Bentley, circa 1920
- Cornelius Joseph Murray, circa 1951
- Francis Joseph Bevilacqua, circa 1975
- Larry Giordano
- Arthur Broadhurst
- Linda Dean Campbell, 2007–2023
- Ryan Hamilton, 2023–current

== See also ==
- List of Massachusetts House of Representatives elections
- Other Essex County districts of the Massachusetts House of Representatives: 1st, 2nd, 3rd, 4th, 5th, 6th, 7th, 8th, 9th, 10th, 11th, 12th, 13th, 14th, 16th, 17th, 18th
- Essex County districts of the Massachusett Senate: 1st, 2nd, 3rd; 1st Essex and Middlesex; 2nd Essex and Middlesex
- List of Massachusetts General Courts
- List of former districts of the Massachusetts House of Representatives

== Images ==
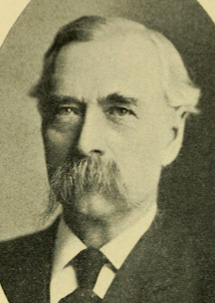
Charles Mansfield

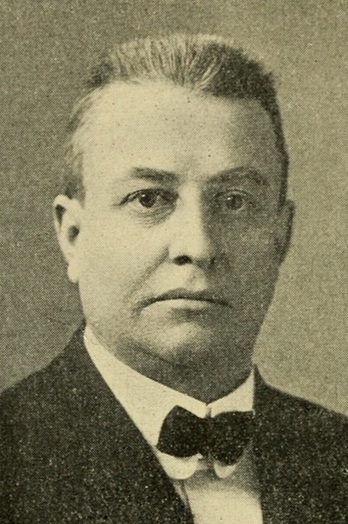
Herbert Forristall

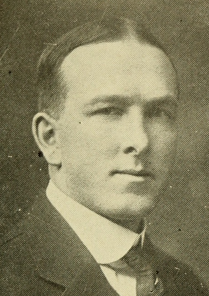
James Bentley

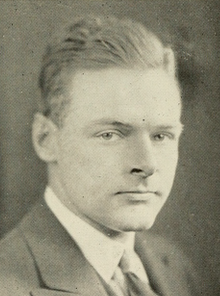
Henry Cabot Lodge Jr.

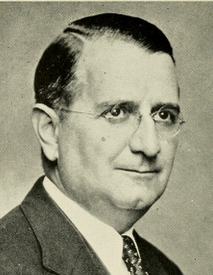
John Wilson

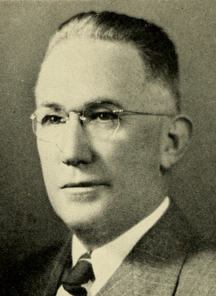
Cornelius Murray

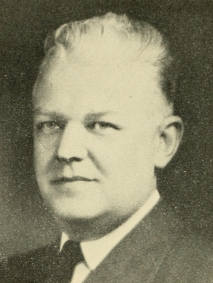
Russell Brown

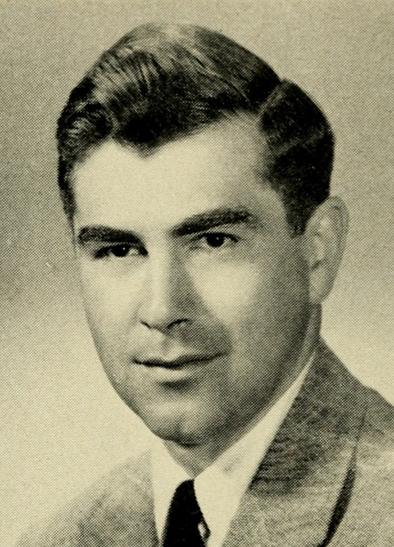
C. Henry Glovsky

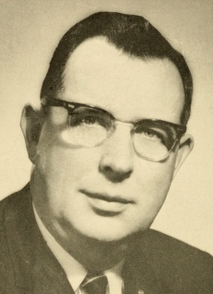
Lawrence Smith

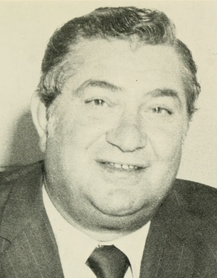
Francis Bevilacqua

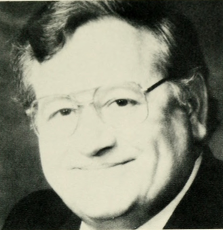
Nicholas Buglione

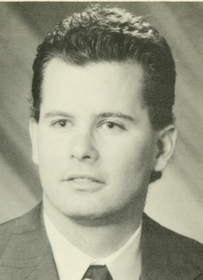
Arthur Broadhurst

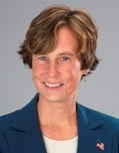
Linda Dean Campbell
