= Francis Bevilacqua =

American politician

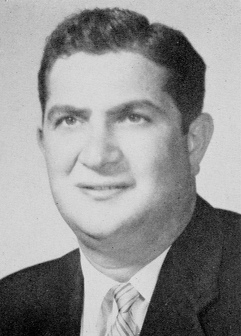
Portrait of Francis Bevilacqua, circa 1967

Francis J. 'Bevi' Bevilacqua (born August 12, 1923, in Haverhill, Massachusetts – May 16, 2009 Lawrence, Massachusetts) was an American politician who represented the 3rd Essex district in the Massachusetts House of Representatives from 1959 to 1981. He served on several committees including Ways & Means, Rules (serving as Assistant Majority Leader), State Administration, Counties (he was chairperson from 1965 to 1967), and Cities and Towns. In 1964, he was a member of the Electoral College.

== See also ==
- Massachusetts House of Representatives' 15th Essex district
