= Christina Minicucci =

Massachusetts politician

Christina A. Minicucci is an American politician and public servant.

== Background ==
Christina Minicucci
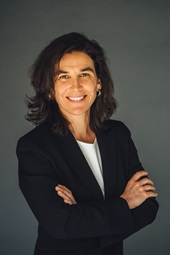

Member of the Massachusetts House of Representatives from the 14th Essex District
- In office January 2, 2019 – January 4, 2023
- Preceded by: Diana DiZoglio
- Succeeded by: Adrianne Ramos

Personal details
- Party: Democratic Party
- Education: Bowdoin College

Christina A. Minicucci was a State Representative for the 14th Essex District in the Massachusetts House of Representatives from 2019 to 2023. While in office, she represented the communities of Haverhill, Lawrence, Methuen, and North Andover. Minicucci served on the House Committee on Steering, Policy and Scheduling, Joint Committee on Community Development and Small Businesses, Joint Committee on Municipalities and Regional Government, and the Joint Committee on Public Safety and Homeland Security.

== Politics ==
Minicucci first ran for State Representative in 2018 upon the retirement of Diana DiZoglio. In the Democratic primary she defeated former Methuen city councilor Lisa Ferry, and in the general she beat Republican nominee Ryan Losco. In 2020, Minicucci won a second term with no opposition.

Minicucci did not seek a third term in 2022, and left office in January 2023.

== Career ==
In February 2023, after leaving office, Minicucci began work at MeVa Transit as their development director.

== Personal life ==
Minicucci was born in Lawrence, Massachusetts to Louis Minicucci Jr. and Judy McCabe Minicucci. She married Eric Loth in 2002. She is a resident of North Andover and has three children named Fritz, Aidan, and Saoirse.

== See also ==
- 2019–2020 Massachusetts legislature
- 2021–2022 Massachusetts legislature
