= Massachusetts House of Representatives' 4th Essex district =

American legislative district

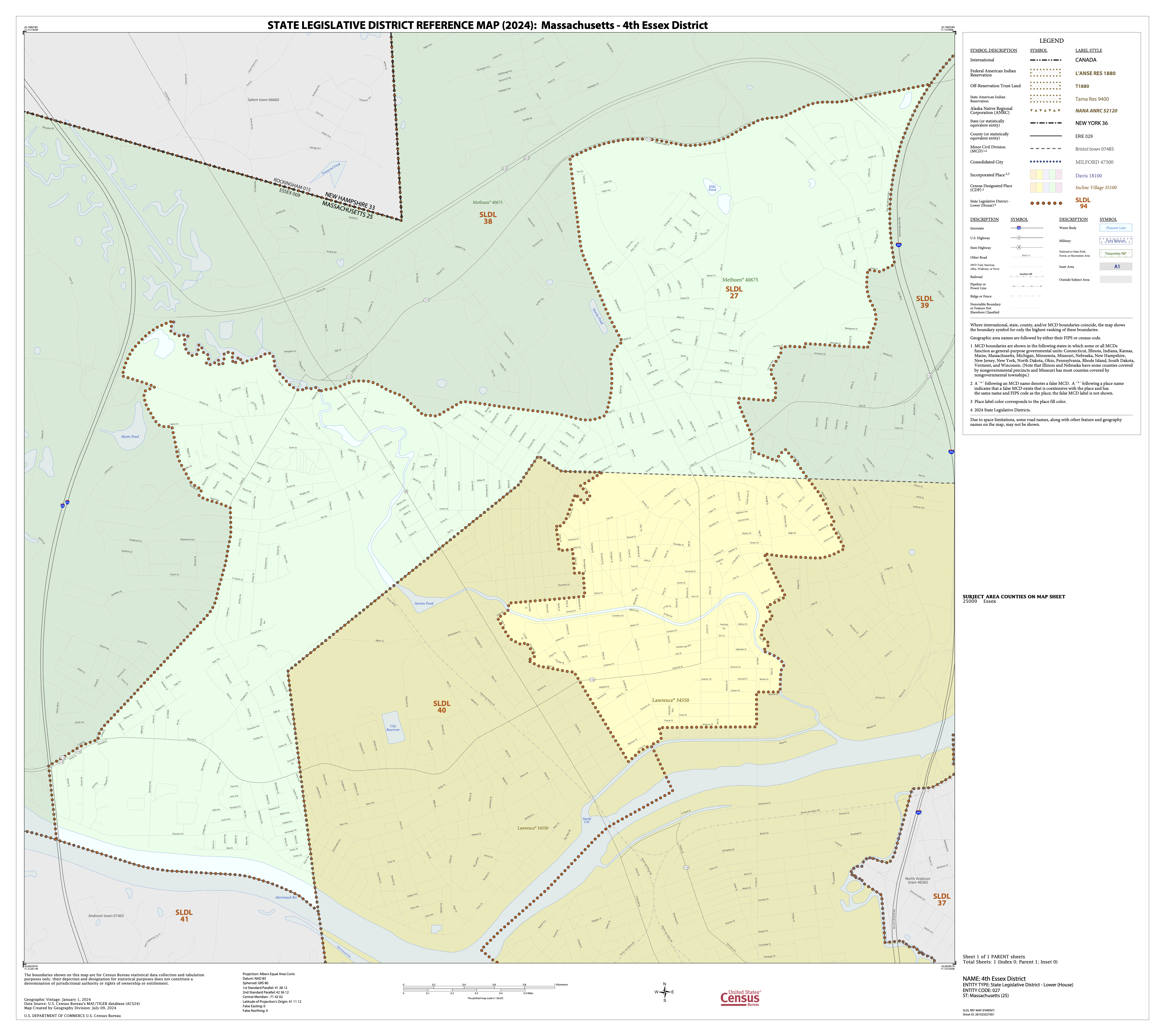
Map of Massachusetts House of Representatives' 4th Essex district, based on the 2020 United States census.

Massachusetts House of Representatives' 4th Essex district is one of 160 districts included in the lower house of the Massachusetts General Court. It covers parts of the cities of Methuen and Lawrence in Essex County. Democrat Estela Reyes of Lawrence has represented the district since 2023.

== Towns represented ==
The district includes the part following localities:

- Lawrence
- Methuen

The current district geographic boundary overlaps with those of the Massachusetts Senate's 1st Essex district.

=== Former locales ===
The district previously covered:

- Andover, circa 1872
- North Andover, circa 1872

== Representatives ==
- Francis P. Putnam, circa 1858-1859
- Michael Carney, circa 1888
- Frank A. Oberti, circa 1920
- George Pearl Webster, circa 1920
- Alyce Louise Schlapp, circa 1945
- Harvey Armand Pothier, circa 1951
- Kevin M. Burke, circa 1975
- Forrester Clark
- James Colt
- Bradford Hill, 1999-2021
- Jamie Belsito, 2021–2023
- Estela Reyes, 2023–present

== See also ==
- List of Massachusetts House of Representatives elections
- Other Essex County districts of the Massachusetts House of Representatives: 1st, 2nd, 3rd, 5th, 6th, 7th, 8th, 9th, 10th, 11th, 12th, 13th, 14th, 15th, 16th, 17th, 18th
- Essex County districts of the Massachusett Senate: 1st, 2nd, 3rd; 1st Essex and Middlesex; 2nd Essex and Middlesex
- List of Massachusetts General Courts
- List of former districts of the Massachusetts House of Representatives

== Images ==
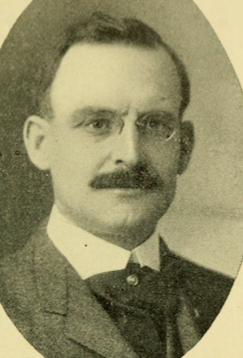
Arthur Nason

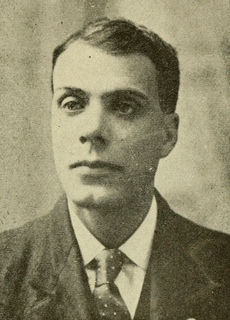
Charles Morrill

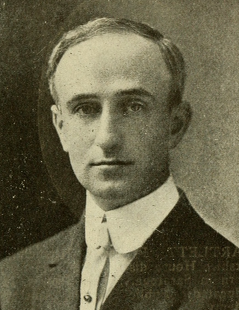
Joseph Barry

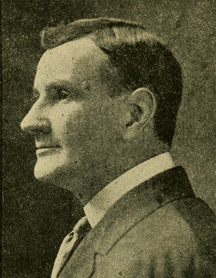
George Pearl Webster

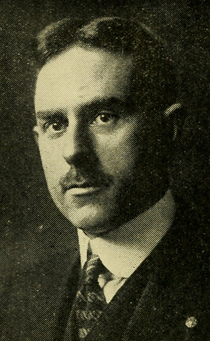
J. Bradford Davis

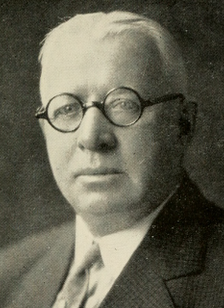
Michael Jordan

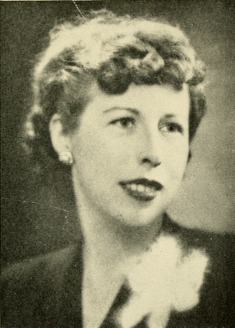
Alyce Louise Schlapp

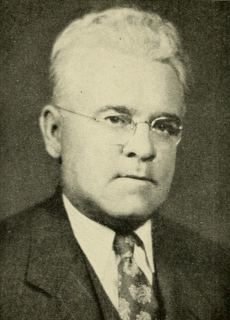
J. Everett Collins

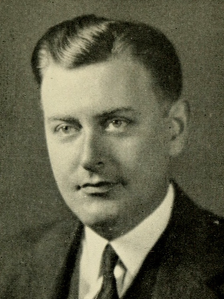
Ralph Hill

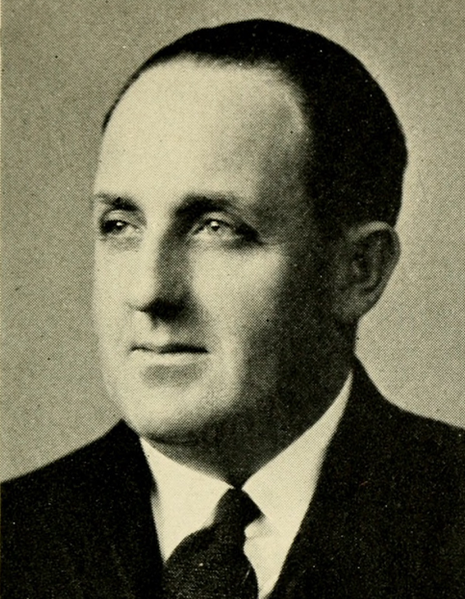
Harvey Armand Pothier

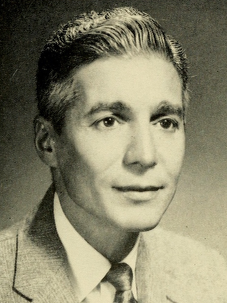
Thomas Bussone

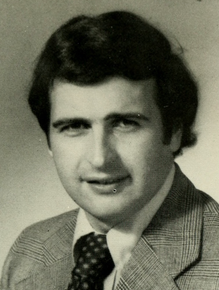
Kevin Burke

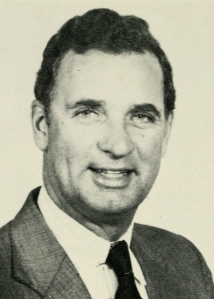
Forrester Clark

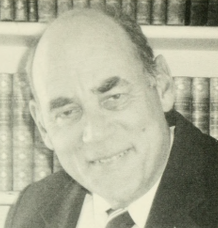
James Colt

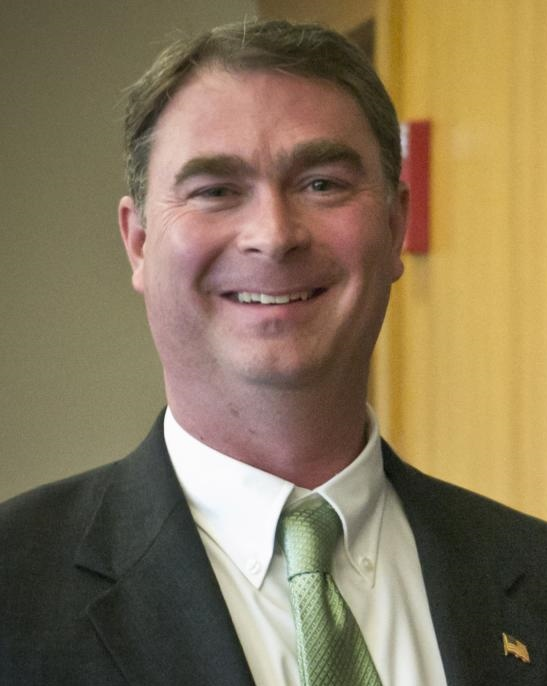
Bradford Hill

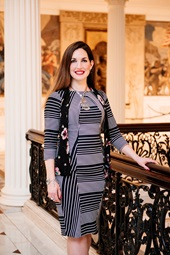
Jamie Belsito
