= Massachusetts House of Representatives' 14th Essex district =

American legislative district

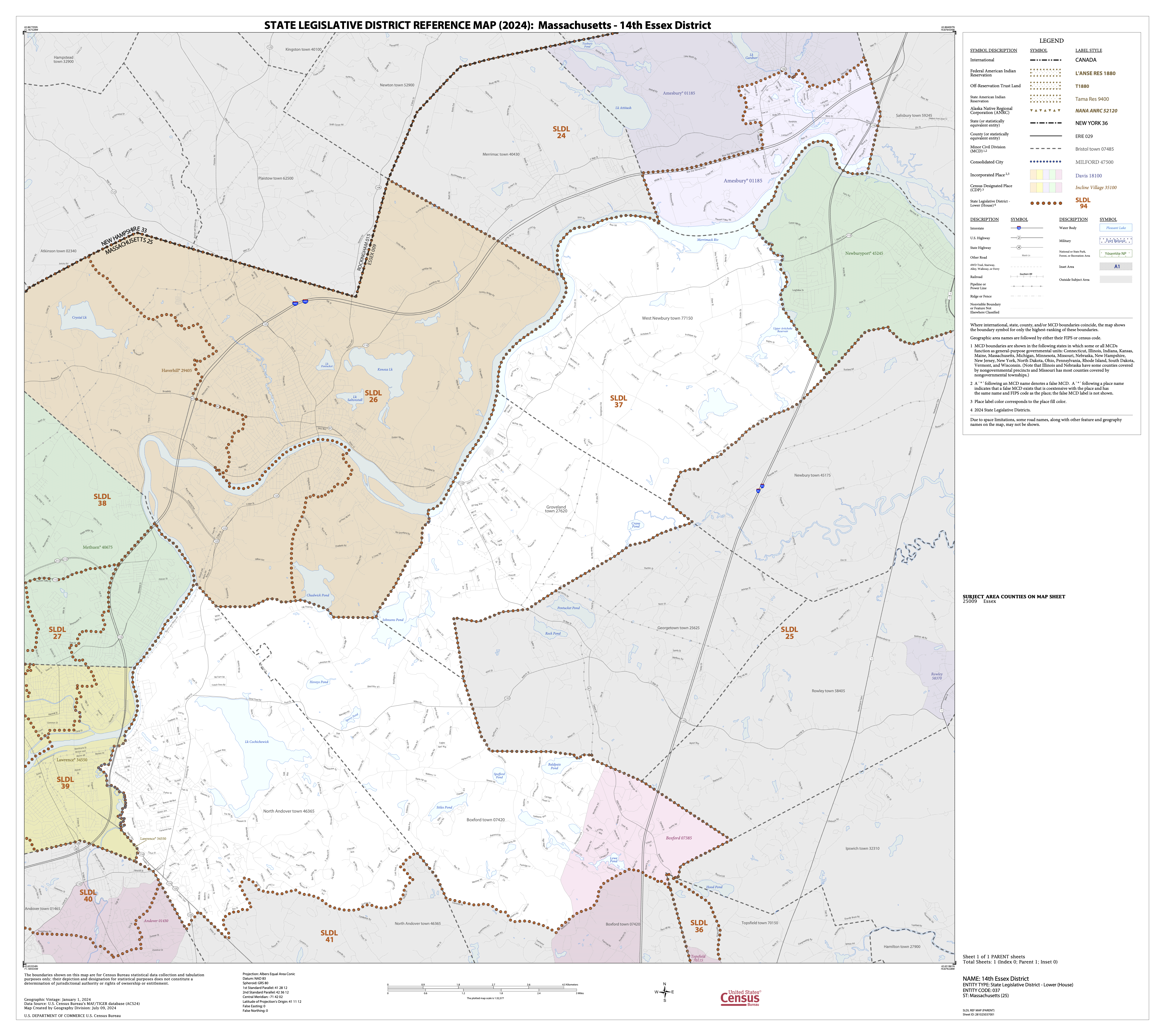
Map of Massachusetts House of Representatives' 14th Essex district, based on the 2020 United States census.

Massachusetts House of Representatives' 14th Essex district is one of 160 districts included in the lower house of the Massachusetts General Court. It covers part of Essex County. Democrat Adrianne Ramos has represented the district since 2023.

== Locales represented ==
The district includes the following localities:

- part of Haverhill
- part of Lawrence
- part of Methuen
- part of North Andover

The current district geographic boundary overlaps with those of the Massachusetts Senate's 1st Essex, 1st Essex and Middlesex, and 2nd Essex and Middlesex districts.

=== Former locale ===
The district previously covered part of Salem, circa 1872.

== Representatives ==
- Eleazer Austin, circa 1858
- Thomas D. Hamson, circa 1858–1859
- Benjamin G. Hathaway, circa 1859
- Samuel L. Gracey, circa 1888
- Charles H. Annis, circa 1920
- William F. Craig, circa 1920
- George Henry Newhall, circa 1920
- John A. Davis, circa 1951
- Eben Parsons, circa 1951
- Kendall Ainsworth Sanderson, circa 1951
- Bernard D. Flynn, circa 1975
- Joseph N. Hermann, 1979—1993
- Donna Cuomo, 1993–1999
- David Torrisi, 1999–2013
- Diana DiZoglio, 2013–2019
- Christina Minicucci, 2019–2023
- Adrianne Ramos, 2023—present

== See also ==
- List of Massachusetts House of Representatives elections
- Other Essex County districts of the Massachusetts House of Representatives: 1st, 2nd, 3rd, 4th, 5th, 6th, 7th, 8th, 9th, 10th, 11th, 12th, 13th, 15th, 16th, 17th, 18th
- Essex County districts of the Massachusett Senate: 1st, 2nd, 3rd; 1st Essex and Middlesex; 2nd Essex and Middlesex
- List of Massachusetts General Courts
- List of former districts of the Massachusetts House of Representatives

== Images ==
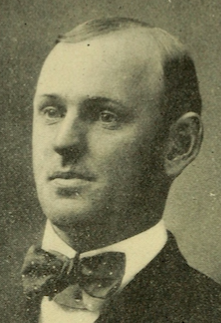
Charles Cabot Johnson

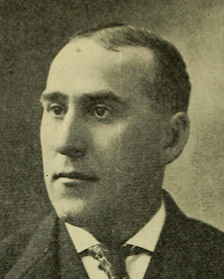
Matthew McCann

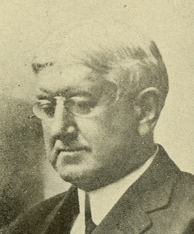
James Odlin

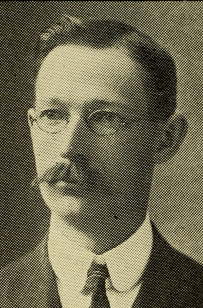
William Craig

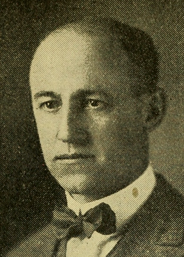
Alfred Wesley Ingalls

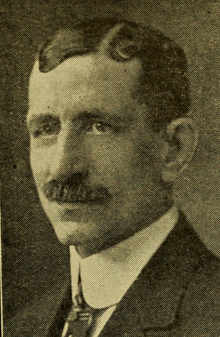
Charles Annis

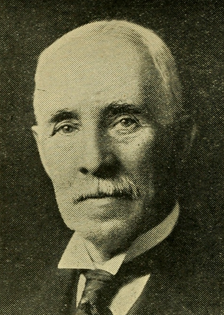
George Henry Newhall

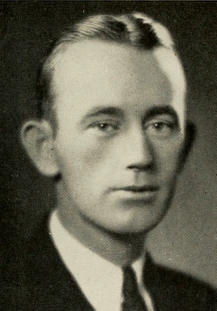
James Tobin

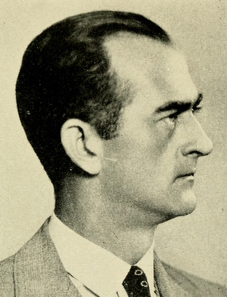
Joseph Harrington

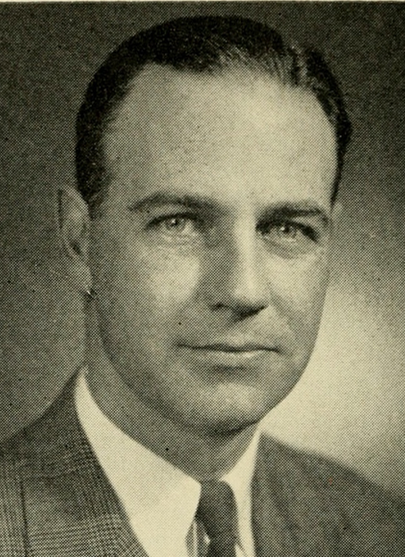
Ernest April

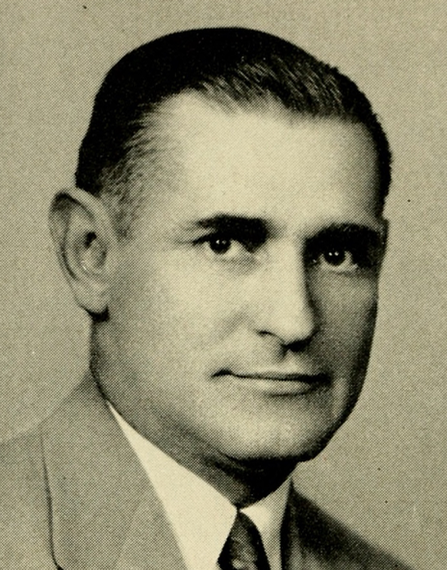
John Davis

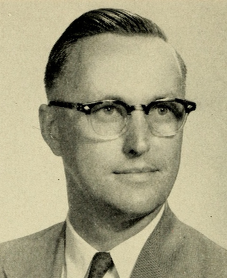
Thomas Newth

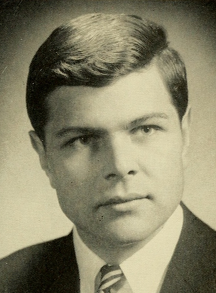
Anthony DiFruscia

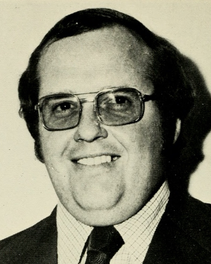
Bernard Flynn

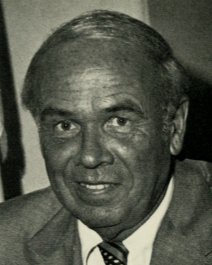
Joseph Hermann

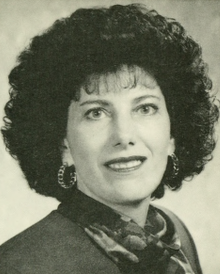
Donna Cuomo

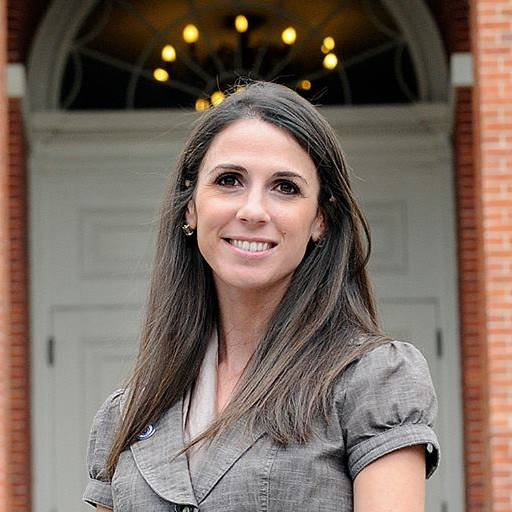
Diana DiZoglio

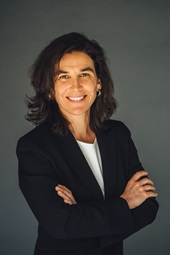
Christina Minicucci
