= Julie Gilligan =

American politician

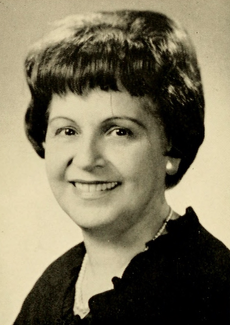

Member of the Massachusetts House of Representatives from the 9th Essex district
- In office 1961–1968

Julie Gilligan was an American Democratic politician from Lynn, Massachusetts. She represented the 9th Essex district in the Massachusetts House of Representatives from 1961 to 1968.
