= Massachusetts House of Representatives' 9th Essex district =

American legislative district

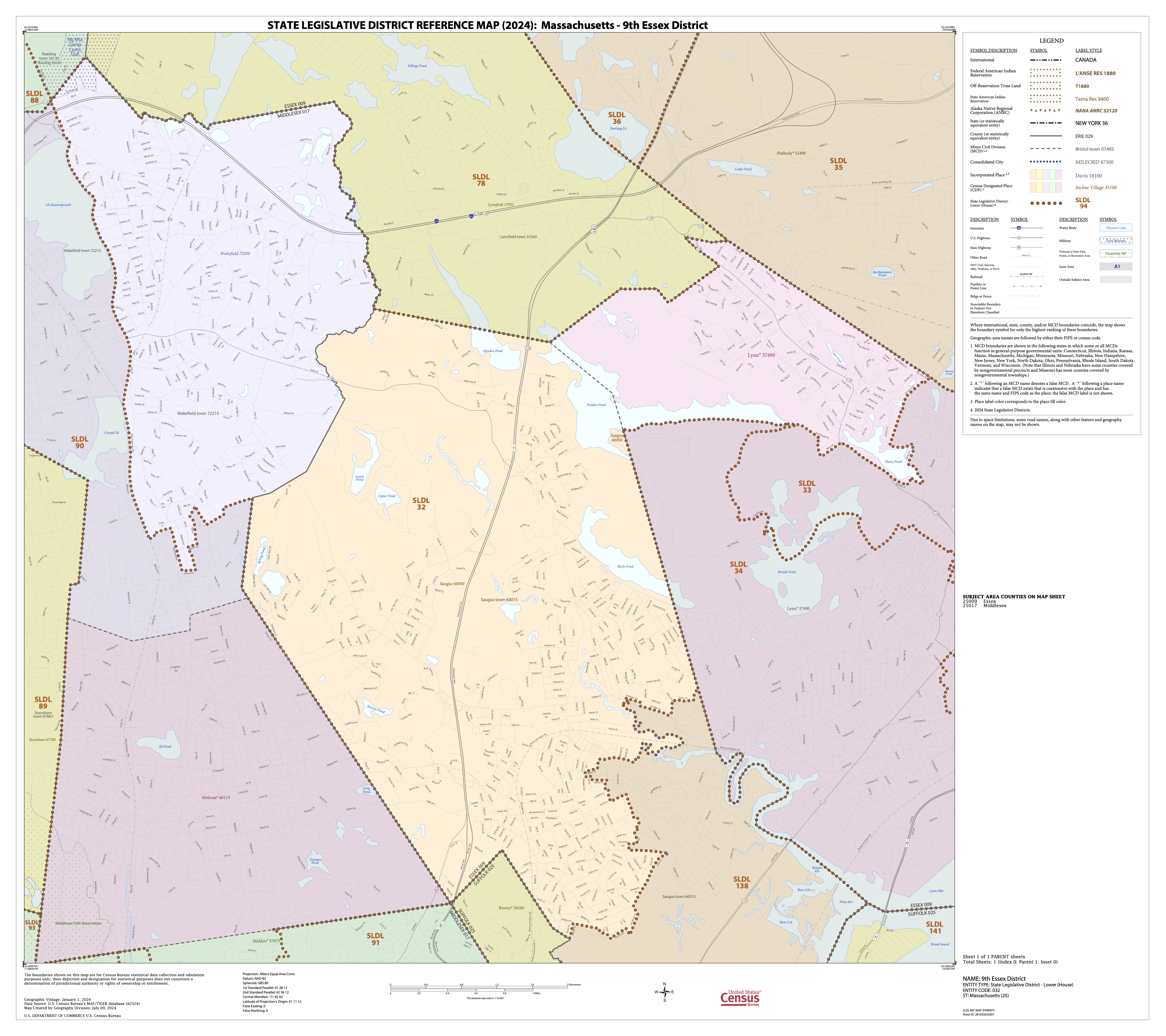
Map of Massachusetts House of Representatives' 9th Essex district, based on the 2020 United States census.

Massachusetts House of Representatives' 9th Essex district is one of 160 districts included in the lower house of the Massachusetts General Court. It covers parts of Lynn and Saugus in Essex County and part of Wakefield in Middlesex County. Republican Donald Wong of Saugus has represented the district since 2011.

== Locales represented ==
The district includes the following localities:

- part of Lynn
- part of Saugus
- part of Wakefield

The current district geographic boundary overlaps with those of the Massachusetts Senate's 3rd Essex and 5th Middlesex districts.

=== Former locale ===
The district previously covered Rockport, circa 1872.

== Representatives ==
- Joseph Ross, circa 1858
- Ebenezer Cogswell, circa 1859
- Caleb Jerome Norwood, circa 1888
- James W. Robertson, circa 1920
- Everett Breed Bacheller, circa 1951
- Julie Gilligan, 1961–1968
- J. Michael Ruane, circa 1975
- Belden Bly
- Steven Angelo
- Mark Falzone
- Donald H. Wong, 2011–current

== See also ==
- List of Massachusetts House of Representatives elections
- Other Essex County districts of the Massachusetts House of Representatives: 1st, 2nd, 3rd, 4th, 5th, 6th, 7th, 8th, 10th, 11th, 12th, 13th, 14th, 15th, 16th, 17th, 18th
- Essex County districts of the Massachusett Senate: 1st, 2nd, 3rd; 1st Essex and Middlesex; 2nd Essex and Middlesex
- List of Massachusetts General Courts
- List of former districts of the Massachusetts House of Representatives

== Images ==
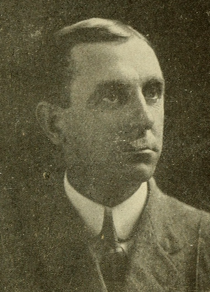
Nesbit Gleason

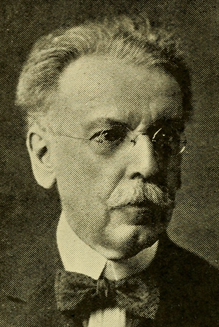
Charles Abbott

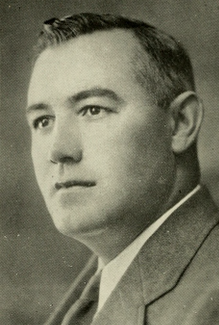
Cornelius Donovan

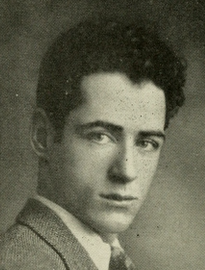
Patrick Kearns

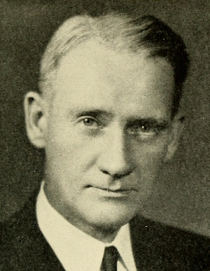
Louis O'Keefe

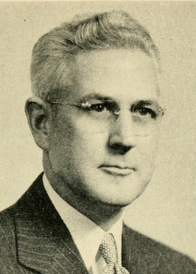
Paul Zollo

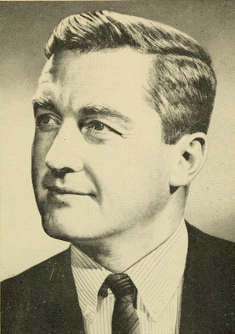
Andre Sigourney

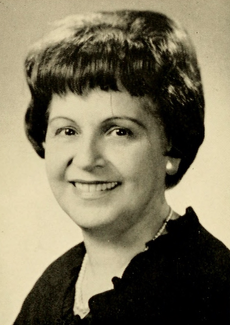
Julie Gilligan

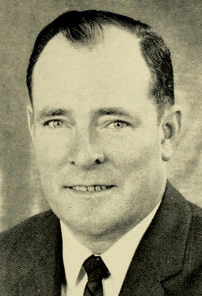
Philip Carney

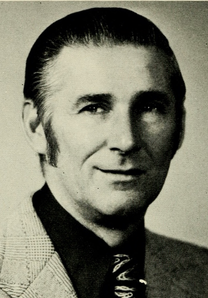
J. Michael Ruane

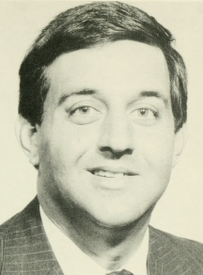
Steven Angelo

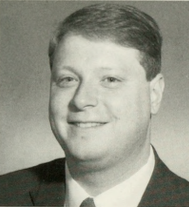
Mark Falzone
