= Massachusetts House of Representatives' 13th Essex district =

American legislative district

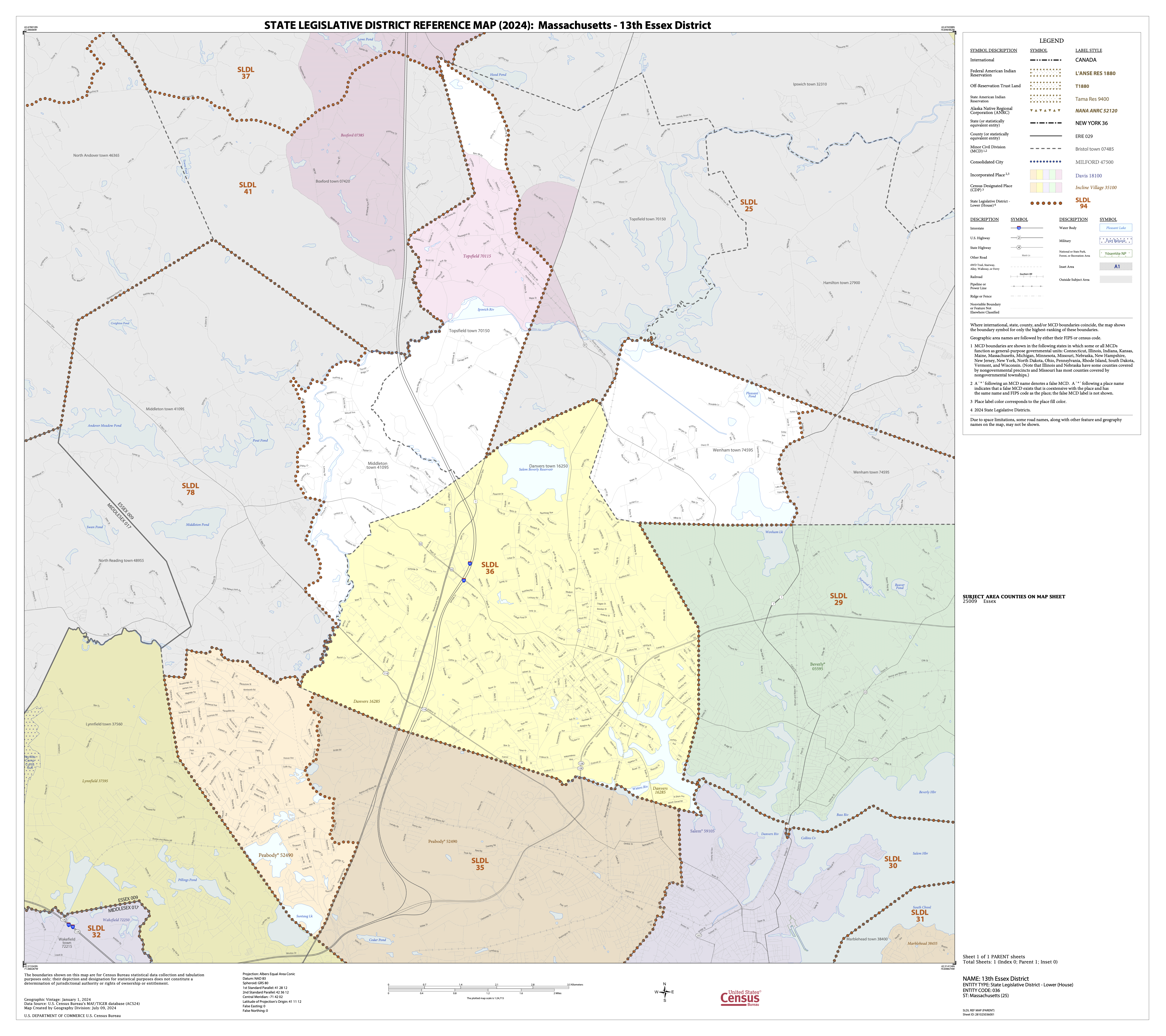
Map of Massachusetts House of Representatives' 13th Essex district, based on the 2020 United States census.

Massachusetts House of Representatives' 13th Essex district is one of 160 districts included in the lower house of the Massachusetts General Court. It covers part of Essex County. Democrat Sally Kerans of Danvers has represented the district since 2021.

== Locales represented ==
The district includes the following localities:

- Danvers
- part of Middleton
- part of Peabody

The current district geographic boundary overlaps with those of the Massachusetts Senate's 1st Essex and Middlesex and 2nd Essex districts.

=== Former locale ===
The district previously covered part of Salem, circa 1872.

== Representatives ==
- Joseph W. Abbott, circa 1858
- Dean Peabody, circa 1859
- Francis Taylor Berry, circa 1888
- Vernon Wynne Evans, circa 1920
- Tony A. Garofano, circa 1920
- Daniel J. Hayden, circa 1920
- Harriet Russell Hart, 1925–26
- Frank Edwin Boot, circa 1951
- Michael Joseph Carroll, circa 1951
- Richard James White, Jr., circa 1951
- Henry A. Walker, circa 1975
- John E. Murphy, Jr.
- Peter G. Torkildsen, 1985–1991
- Sally Kerans, 1991–1997
- Theodore C. Speliotis, 1997–2021
- Sally Kerans, 2021–present

== See also ==
- List of Massachusetts House of Representatives elections
- Other Essex County districts of the Massachusetts House of Representatives: 1st, 2nd, 3rd, 4th, 5th, 6th, 7th, 8th, 9th, 10th, 11th, 12th, 14th, 15th, 16th, 17th, 18th
- Essex County districts of the Massachusett Senate: 1st, 2nd, 3rd; 1st Essex and Middlesex; 2nd Essex and Middlesex
- List of Massachusetts General Courts
- List of former districts of the Massachusetts House of Representatives

== Images ==
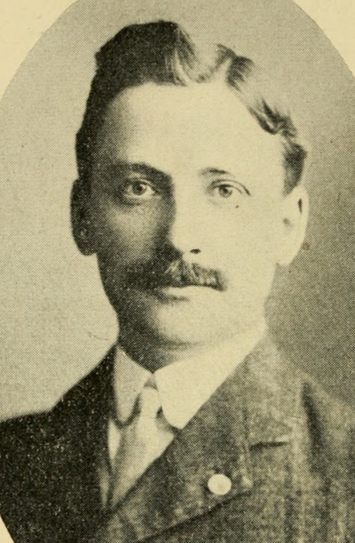
John Cormack

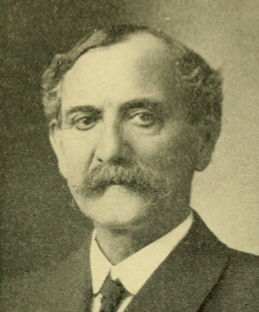
John McKenney

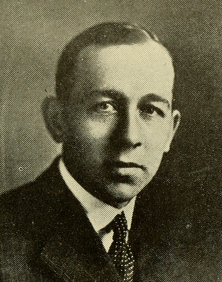
Ernest William Allen

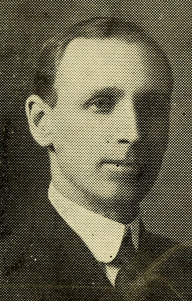
George Nourse

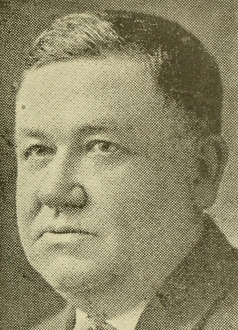
Thomas Baxter

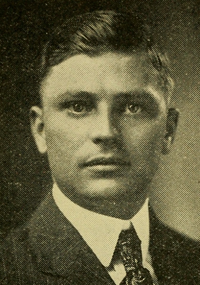
Ralph Howard Burckes

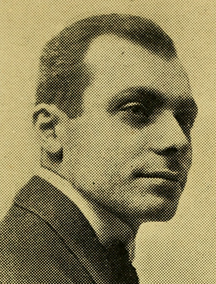
Tony Garofano

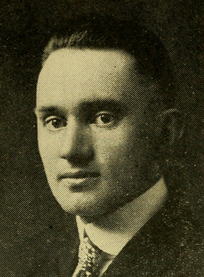
Vernon Wynne Evans

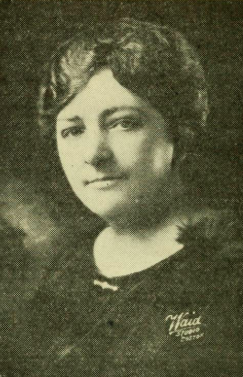
Harriet Russell Hart

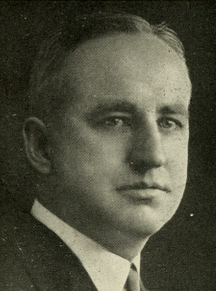
Edward Coffey

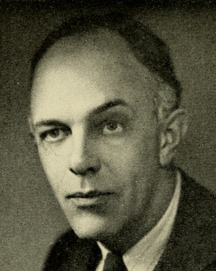
Eben Parsons

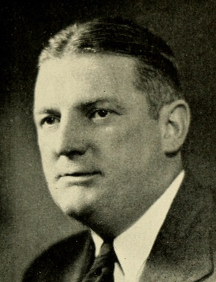
Edmond Talbot

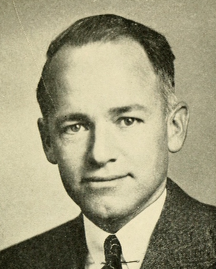
Lester Morley

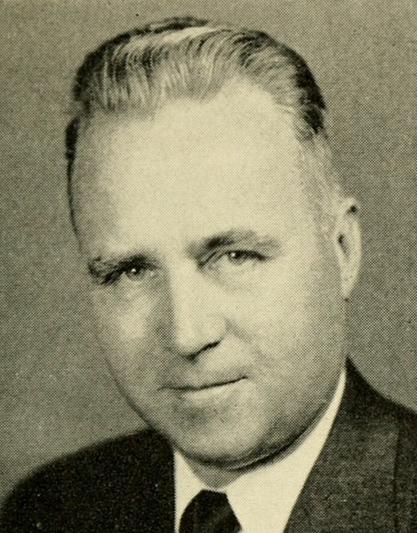
Frank Edwin Boot

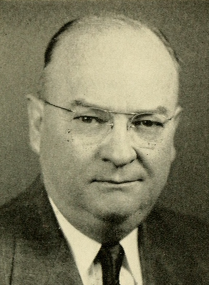
Michael Joseph Carroll

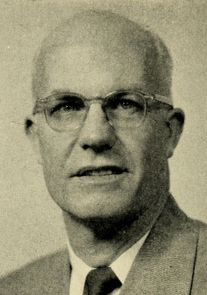
Norman Eugene Folsom

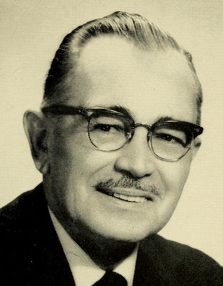
Gerard Guilmette

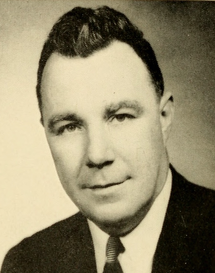
John Bresnahan

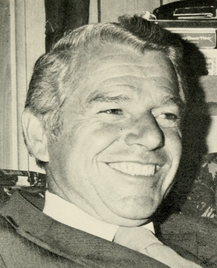
Henry Walker

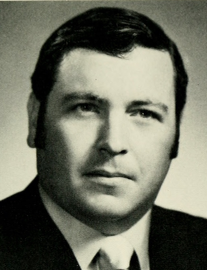
John Murphy

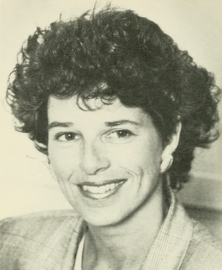
Sally Kerans

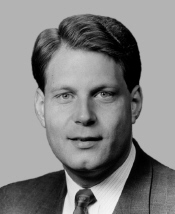
Peter Torkildsen
