= James Colt =

American politician

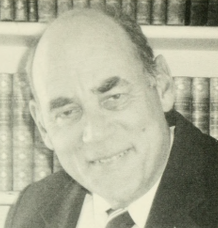

Member of the Massachusetts House of Representatives from the 4th Essex District
- In office 1995–1997
- Preceded by: Forrester Clark
- Succeeded by: Forrester Clark

Personal details
- Born: August 19, 1932 Boston, Massachusetts
- Died: June 5, 2008 (aged 75) Danvers, Massachusetts
- Party: Republican
- Education: Harvard University; University of Virginia School of Law
- Occupation: Lawyer; Politician

James Denison Colt (August 19, 1932 – June 5, 2008) was an American lawyer and politician who represented the 4th Essex District in the Massachusetts House of Representatives from 1995 to 1997.

== Early life ==
Colt was born on August 19, 1932, in Boston, Massachusetts, to Mary Forbes Atkinson Colt and Henry F. Colt. He was a member of Forbes family.

Colt attended The Park School and St. Paul's School. He then went on to Harvard University, where he was a member of the Harvard Crimson hockey team. Colt graduated in 1954 and then served two years in the United States Army. In 1959 he graduated from the University of Virginia School of Law.

== Legal career ==
In 1959, Colt joined the Boston law firm of Peabody and Arnold. He later founded his own firm, Goodhue, Colt & Steffensen, where he practiced probate and estate law. His final legal work came with the firm of Taylor, Ganson and Perrin in Boston, where he was of counsel.

Colt also served as a trustee of the Gardner Howland Shaw Foundation, an organization dedicated to the improvement of the Massachusetts penal system. He was also a director of the Center for Addictive Behavior.

== Political career ==
Colt held a number of political offices in Milton, Massachusetts. From 1968 to 1972 he was a member of the town's Warrant Committee. He was chairman of the board for two years. From 1972 to 1973 he was a member of the Town Government Study Committee. Colt was a member of the Milton Board of Selectmen from 1973 to 1982 and was chairman for three years.

Colt remained active in politics following his move to Wenham, Massachusetts. He was a member of the Hamilton-Wenham Open Space and Housing Committee from 1987 to 1989 and the Wenham Board of Selectmen from 1990 to 1995.

In 1995, Colt succeeded his friend Forrester Clark in the Massachusetts House of Representatives after Clark gave up his seat to run for Massachusetts State Auditor. In 1996, Clark, who was upset over the fact Colt had gone on vacation during the 1995 budget battle, challenged Colt for the Republican nomination. Clark defeated Colt by 58 votes.

Colt also served as a member Republican State Committee and was Massachusetts treasurer for Ronald Reagan's 1984 presidential campaign and George H. W. Bush's 1988 campaign.

== Personal life and death ==
Colt married Elizabeth Reynolds in December 1969. The couple had three daughters.

One of Colt's nephews was author George Howe Colt, who wrote about him in The Big House. Colt was also distant cousin of John Kerry.

Colt was a co-owner of the Forbes family's estate on Naushon Island. He was a trustee of the estate for 30 years and managing trustee for seven.

Colt died on June 5, 2008, at Kaplan Family Hospice House in Danvers, Massachusetts, of cancer.
