= Barry Finegold =

American politician (born 1971)

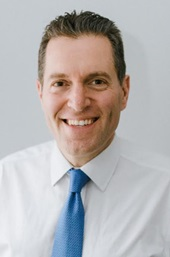

Member of the Massachusetts Senate from the Second Essex and Middlesex district
- Incumbent
- Assumed office January 2019
- Preceded by: Barbara L'Italien
- In office January 5, 2011 – January 7, 2015
- Preceded by: Susan Tucker
- Succeeded by: Barbara L'Italien

Member of the Massachusetts House of Representatives from the 17th Essex district
- In office January 1997 – January 5, 2011
- Preceded by: Gary Coon
- Succeeded by: Paul Adams

Personal details
- Born: March 3, 1971 (age 55) Norwood, Massachusetts, U.S.
- Party: Democratic
- Spouse: Amy Finegold
- Education: Franklin & Marshall College; Massachusetts School of Law; Harvard University
- Profession: Attorney

Barry R. Finegold (March 3, 1971 in Norwood, Massachusetts) currently serves as a Democratic member of the Massachusetts Senate representing the Second Essex and Middlesex district since 2019. He previously served from January 2011 to January 2015. He is a former state representative of the 17th Essex district in Massachusetts.

== Biography ==
Barry Finegold was raised in Andover and Tewksbury with his two sisters. Both of his parents taught in local school systems for 33 years, his mother in the Andover Public Schools, and his father at Northern Essex Community College in Haverhill. Finegold attended both Andover and Tewksbury public schools. He then attended Franklin and Marshall College in Pennsylvania, graduating with a major in government with a business concentration. He went on to graduate from the Massachusetts School of Law in Andover and was admitted to the Massachusetts Bar in 1998. He is a partner with the law firm of Dalton & Finegold, LLP, which specializes in real estate, estate planning, and corporate law. Finegold also holds a Masters in Public Administration from the John F. Kennedy School of Government at Harvard University. He and his wife, Amy, live with their three children Ava, Ella and Max, and their bulldog Otis in Andover. He is Jewish.

== Political career ==
Finegold was elected to the Andover Board of Selectmen at age 24. A year later, in 1996, he won election to the Massachusetts House of Representatives as a Democrat. He held this position for 11 years, representing the 17th Essex District, consisting of Andover, Tewksbury and Lawrence.

Finegold ran for Massachusetts State Senate in 2010, seeking to represent the Second Essex and Middlesex district consisting of Andover, Dracut, Lawrence and Tewksbury. The incumbent, Susan Tucker, was retiring. After winning the Democratic primary election, Finegold faced off against Republican Jamison Tomasek and Tea-Party-endorsed independent candidate Jodi Oberto for the seat. Finegold won the race with strong showings in Andover and Lawrence. He lost the towns of Dracut and Tewksbury by narrow margins.

Finegold won reelection in 2012 against Republican Paul Adams, sweeping every precinct of all four communities .

In January 2014, he announced that he would be a candidate for the Democratic nomination for Treasurer and Receiver-General of the Commonwealth of Massachusetts. On September 9, 2014, Finegold lost in the Democratic primary to Deb Goldberg, who was elected Treasurer in November 2014.

In March 2018, Finegold announced that he was running for the Massachusetts State Senate seat he previously held. He won the three-way primary election by 47% defeating Michael Armano (32%) and Pavel Payano (20%) in the primary race and won the general election by a 2-to-1 ratio against Republican Joe Espinola, earning 63% of the vote to Espinola's 37%.

=== Legislation ===
During his time on Beacon Hill, Finegold has proposed and enacted legislation that includes:

- The "Massachusetts Renewable Energy Road Map," a package of policy ideas including research-and-development grants and tax incentives for Massachusetts companies developing fuel-cell technology. The legislation also creates a $1,500 state tax credit for consumers who purchase hybrid vehicles.
- The Safe Havens Act allows parents who are unable to care for their newborn to drop the infant off at a marked fire station, police station or emergency room without fear of prosecution.
- In 2000, Finegold authored the Holocaust Restitution Bill, which ensured that the 3,500 Massachusetts holocaust survivors did not have to pay taxes or incur penalties on recovered assets from the Swiss Government.
- Finegold helped create the Massachusetts Hydrogen Coalition and is working to expand hydrogen, fuel cell, and related industries in the Commonwealth.
- In the 2020 budget cycle, Finegold secured funding for Delamano, a Spanish-speaking battered women's hotline, and Andover Youth Services.
- Finegold worked with Dracut residents to secure funding from the Massachusetts School Building Authority for the new Dracut High School. With his efforts, the town received $36.5 million from the state for the renovation and addition project. With Finegold's help, the Lawrence school system has benefited from two new buildings, three new schools, and increased funding. He was also an early supporter of the new Tewksbury High School project and pushed for the construction of a new, energy efficient and technologically advanced facility, securing funding from the Massachusetts School Building Authority, which funded 60 percent of the project.
- As the Senate Chair of the Election Laws Committee, Finegold was the chief architect of the 2014 election law reform bill, which brought early voting to Massachusetts, as well as online voter registration, post election audits, and preregistration of 16- and 17-year-olds.

In 2019 and again in 2021, Finegold filed the "SAVE Students Act." It would require school districts to establish a threat-assessment training and response program, create an anonymous reporting system run by the state Department of Education, and provide all middle school and high school students with evidence-based education on how to spot warning signs for violence and suicide.

In July 2019, he introduced "Conrad's Law," named after Conrad Roy, who died by suicide in July 2014 after being coerced by his girlfriend, Michelle Carter. The bill, filed with Representative Natalie Higgins, was written in collaboration with Northeastern University School of Law Professor Daniel Medwed and is supported by Conrad's parents. It would allow prosecutors to charge defendants who encourage, coerce, or manipulate another person into committing or attempting suicide, despite knowing that the victim previously thought about, considered, or tried to commit suicide; the crime would be punishable with up to five years in prison.

=== Committee Assignments ===
For the 2025-26 Session, Finegold sits on the following committees in the Senate:

- Economic Development and Emerging Technologies - Chairperson
- Intergovernmental Affairs - Vice Chair
- Post Audit and Oversight
- Census
- Advanced Information Technology, the Internet and Cybersecurity
- Housing

=== Task Forces and Commissions ===
Finegold is a member of the following task forces and commissions:

- Youth Sports Commission
- Blockchain and Cryptocurrency Technology Commission
- Emergency Medical Services Sustainability Task Force

== Awards ==
In 1999, Finegold won the Kennedy School Fenn Award for Political Leadership for his leadership in bringing together legislators and officials from New Hampshire and Massachusetts to address the traffic problems on I-93. His efforts led to the opening of the breakdown lane during rush hours, which greatly reduced congestion during peak commuting hours.

In 2003, Finegold was selected as one of the top young Democrats 100 to Watch by the Democratic Leadership Council.

The Massachusetts Alliance on Teen Pregnancy recognized Barry as Legislator of the Year for his efforts to save their programs from drastic budget cuts.

In 2014, Finegold was named a Clean Energy Champion by the New England Clean Energy Council. Clean Energy Champion Awards are presented to Legislators who have consistently taken the lead in advancing clean energy in the Commonwealth.

== See also ==
- 2019–2020 Massachusetts legislature
- 2021–2022 Massachusetts legislature
