= Massachusetts Senate's 2nd Essex and Middlesex district =

American legislative district

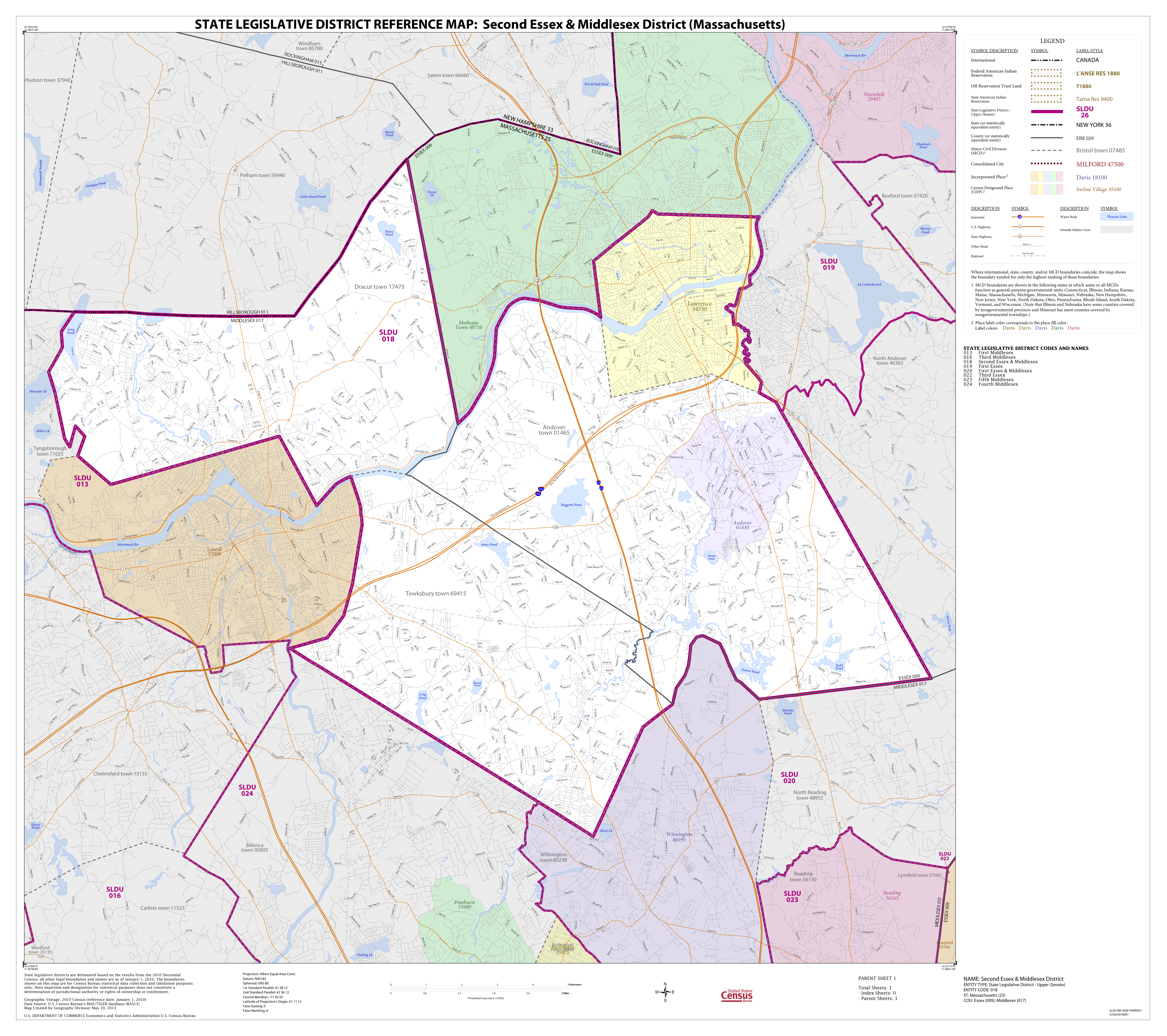
Map of Massachusetts Senate's 2nd Essex and Middlesex district, based on the 2010 United States census.

Massachusetts Senate's 2nd Essex and Middlesex district in the United States is one of 40 legislative districts of the Massachusetts Senate. It covers 14.7% of Essex County and 3.9% of Middlesex County population in 2010. Democrat Barry Finegold of Andover has represented the district since 2019.

== Towns represented ==
The district includes the following localities:

- Andover
- Dracut
- Lawrence
- Tewksbury

The current district geographic boundary overlaps with those of the Massachusetts House of Representatives' 14th Essex, 16th Essex, 17th Essex, 18th Essex, 19th Middlesex, and 36th Middlesex districts.

== List of senators ==
Senator	Party	Years	Legis.	Electoral history	District towns
District created in 1975.
William X. Wall	Democratic	1975 – 1981	169th 170th 171st	Redistricted from 5th Essex district. Re-elected in 1974. Re-elected in 1976. Re-elected in 1978. Lost Democratic primary in 1980.	
Patricia McGovern	Democratic	1981 – 1993	172nd 173rd 174th 175th 176th 177th	Elected in 1980. Re-elected in 1982. Re-elected in 1984. Re-elected in 1986. Re-elected in 1988. Re-elected in 1990. Retired.	
John D. O'Brien	Democratic	1993 — 1999	178th 179th 180th	Elected in 1992. Re-elected in 1994. Re-elected in 1996.	
Susan Tucker	Democratic	1999 — 2011	181st 182nd 183rd 184th 185th 186th	Elected in 1998. Re-elected in 2000. Re-elected in 2002. Re-elected in 2004. Re-elected in 2006. Re-elected in 2008. Retired.	
Barry R. Finegold	Democratic	January 5, 2011– January 7, 2015	187th 188th	Elected in 2010. Re-elected in 2012. Ran for Massachusetts Treasurer in 2014.	
Barbara L'Italien	Democratic	January 7, 2015 – January 2019	189th 190th	Elected in 2014. Re-elected in 2016. Ran for U.S. House in 2018.	
Barry R. Finegold	Democratic	January 2019–	191st 192nd	Elected in 2018. Re-elected in 2020.	

== See also ==
- List of Massachusetts Senate elections
- List of Massachusetts General Courts
- List of former districts of the Massachusetts Senate
- Other Essex County districts of the Massachusett Senate: 1st, 2nd, 3rd; 1st Essex and Middlesex
- Essex County districts of the Massachusetts House of Representatives: 1st, 2nd, 3rd, 4th, 5th, 6th, 7th, 8th, 9th, 10th, 11th, 12th, 13th, 14th, 15th, 16th, 17th, 18th
- Middlesex County districts of the Massachusetts House of Representatives: 1st, 2nd, 3rd, 4th, 5th, 6th, 7th, 8th, 9th, 10th, 11th, 12th, 13th, 14th, 15th, 16th, 17th, 18th, 19th, 20th, 21st, 22nd, 23rd, 24th, 25th, 26th, 27th, 28th, 29th, 30th, 31st, 32nd, 33rd, 34th, 35th, 36th, 37th
