= Bradford Hill =

American politician

Brad Hill
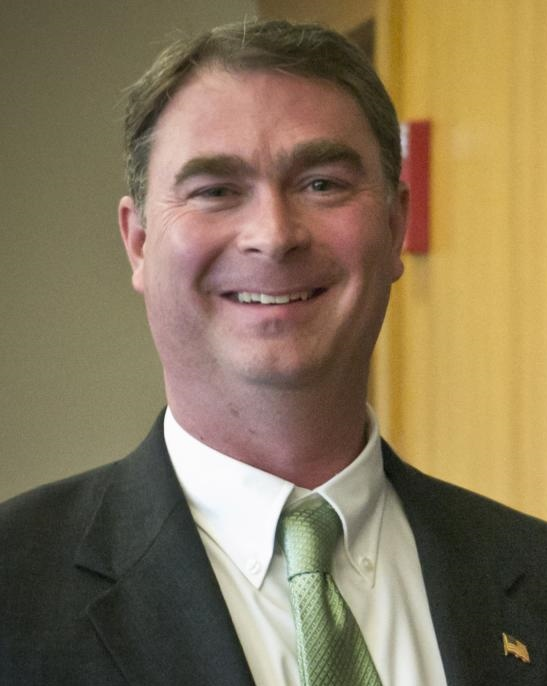
- Hill in 2012 at the Rappaport Center for Law and Public Service.

Member of the Massachusetts Gaming Commission
- Incumbent
- Assumed office September 15, 2021

Member of the Massachusetts House of Representatives from the 4th Essex district
- In office January 7, 1999 – September 15, 2021
- Preceded by: Forrester Clark
- Succeeded by: Jamie Belsito

Personal details
- Born: Bradford R. Hill; January 22, 1967 (age 59) Boston, Massachusetts
- Party: Republican
- Education: Northeast Broadcast School, Salem State College
- Occupation: Municipal Leader, State Legislator, Gaming Official
- Website: https://massgaming.com/the-commission/meet-the-commissioners/bradford-hill/

Bradford R. Hill (born January 22, 1967) is an American politician and current member of the Massachusetts Gaming Commission. Before his commission service, Hill represented the 4th Essex district in the Massachusetts House of Representatives from 1999 to 2021. He was the First Assistant Minority Leader.

Representative Hill resigned as a State Representative on September 15, 2021 to take a position on the Massachusetts Gaming Commission. Governor Charlie Baker and other state officials appointed him.

Prior to his election to the House, Hill served on the Ipswich Board of Selectmen and the Hamilton Zoning Board of Appeals.

== See also ==
- 2019–2020 Massachusetts legislature
- 2021–2022 Massachusetts legislature
