= David Torrisi =

American politician

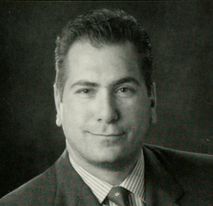
- Portrait of David Torrisi

Member of the Massachusetts House of Representatives from the 14th Essex district
- In office 1999–2013
- Preceded by: Donna Cuomo
- Succeeded by: Diana DiZoglio

Personal details
- Born: September 18, 1968 (age 58) Methuen, Massachusetts
- Party: Democratic
- Education: University of Vermont; Suffolk University Law School
- Occupation: Attorney; Politician

David M. Torrisi (born September 18, 1968, in Methuen, Massachusetts) is an American attorney and politician who represented the 14th Essex district in the Massachusetts House of Representatives.

Torrisi graduated from the University of Vermont in 1990 and found work as a child care counselor. He later served as an aide to Congressman Marty Meehan.

From 1996 to 1999, Torrisi served as a member of the North Andover Board of Selectmen. In 1998 he defeated incumbent Donna Cuomo in the general election.

On September 6, 2012, Torrisi was defeated in the Democratic primary by Diana DiZoglio. He lost every community in his district except North Andover.
