= Theodore C. Speliotis =

American politician

Theodore Speliotis
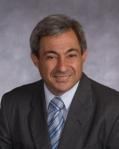
- Theodore C. Speliotis
- Constituency: 13th Essex

Member of the Massachusetts House of Representatives
- In office 1997–2021
- Preceded by: Sally Kerans
- Succeeded by: Sally Kerans
- In office 1979–1987
- Preceded by: Robert C. Buell
- Succeeded by: Thomas Walsh
- Constituency: 12th Essex

Personal details
- Born: August 20, 1953 (age 73) Salem, Massachusetts, U.S.
- Party: Democratic
- Spouse: June (Consigli) Speliotis
- Children: 2
- Education: Northeastern University (BS)
- Occupation: Politician

Theodore C. "Ted" Speliotis (born August 20, 1953) is a former Democratic member of the Massachusetts House of Representatives, representing the 13th Essex District. He lives in Danvers, Massachusetts.

Representative Speliotis attended the Carroll School in Peabody, the Danversport Elementary School, and graduated from Danvers High School in 1971. In 1976, he earned his bachelor's degree in political science and a certification and license to teach from Northeastern University.

Speliotis represented the 12th Essex District from 1979 to 1987. He lost the 1986 Democratic primary to Peabody City Councilor Thomas Walsh.

From 1987 to 1995, Speliotis was the Danvers Town Moderator.

He returned to the House in 1997 following the retirement of Sally Kerans. He did not seek re-election in 2020 and his seat was again taken by Kerans.

== See also ==
- 2019–2020 Massachusetts legislature

Massachusetts House of Representatives
Preceded by Robert C. Buell	Member of the Massachusetts House of Representatives from the 12th Essex district 1979–1987	Succeeded by Thomas Walsh
Preceded by Sally Kerans	Member of the Massachusetts House of Representatives from the 13th Essex district 1997–present	Incumbent
