= Robert Fennell =

American politician (born 1956)

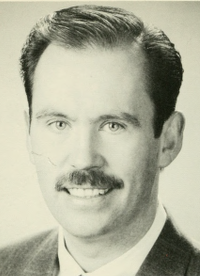
- Portrait of Robert Fennell

Member of the Massachusetts House of Representatives from the 10th Essex district
- In office 1995 – February 24, 2016
- Preceded by: Jeffery Hayward
- Succeeded by: Daniel Cahill

Personal details
- Born: June 26, 1956 (age 70) Lynn, Massachusetts
- Party: Democratic
- Education: Salem State College
- Occupation: Restaurant Owner; Politician

Robert F. Fennell (born June 26, 1956, in Lynn, Massachusetts) is an American restaurateur and politician who owns the Capitol Diner and represented the 10th Essex district in the Massachusetts House of Representatives from 1995 to 2016.
