= Sally Kerans =

American politician (born 1960)

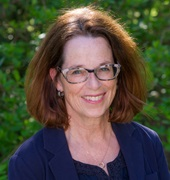

Member of the Massachusetts House of Representatives from the 13th Essex district
- Incumbent
- Assumed office January 6, 2021
- Preceded by: Theodore C. Speliotis
- In office January 1991 – January 1997
- Preceded by: Peter G. Torkildsen
- Succeeded by: Theodore C. Speliotis

Personal details
- Born: May 26, 1960 (age 66) Danvers, Massachusetts, U.S.
- Party: Democratic
- Spouse: Michael Whouley
- Education: University of Massachusetts, Amherst (BA); Harvard University (MPA)

Sally P. Kerans (born May 26, 1960) is an American politician who serves as a member of the Massachusetts House of Representatives for the 13th Essex district. A member of the Democratic Party, she previously represented the district from 1991 to 1997.

== Political career ==
In 1990, Kerans ran to succeed Republican State Representative Peter G. Torkildsen, who retired to seek the Republican nomination for lieutenant governor. She ran unopposed for the Democratic nomination and defeated Republican Douglas Bean with 51.6% of the vote in the general election. Following three terms in office, Kerans stepped away from elected office to focus on her family. She was succeeded in office by fellow Democrat Theodore C. Speliotis.

In April 2020, following the announcement by Speliotis that he would not seek re-election, Kerans declared her candidacy for the seat. She was unopposed in the Democratic primary and defeated four other candidates, including Republican Robert May Jr., in the general election with 46.1% of the vote.

Kerans is a member of the Massachusetts Caucus of Women Legislators. She serves as co-chair of its Pregnancy & Birth Equity Task Force.

=== Committee assignments ===
- Vice Chair, Joint Committee on Public Health
- House Committee on Post Audit and Oversight
- House Committee on Ways and Means
- Joint Committee on Financial Services
- Joint Committee on Ways and Means

== Personal life ==
Kerans and her husband Michael Whouley have two adult children, Nora and Peter.

== See also ==
- 2021–2022 Massachusetts legislature
