= Jamie Belsito =

American politician

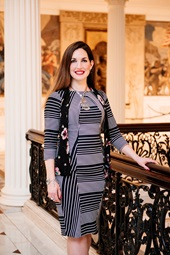

Member of the Massachusetts House of Representatives from the 4th Essex district
- In office December 8, 2021 – January 4, 2023
- Preceded by: Bradford Hill
- Succeeded by: Estela Reyes

Personal details
- Born: Jamie Zahlaway; November 22, 1973 (age 52)
- Party: Democratic
- Education: Salem State University (BA)

Jamie Zahlaway Belsito (born November 22, 1973) is an American politician who serves as Town Moderator in Topsfield, Massachusetts. A member of the Democratic Party, she previously represented the 4th Essex district in the Massachusetts House of Representatives from 2021 to 2023. She is the founder of the Maternal Mental Health Leadership Alliance.

== Political career ==
Belsito was elected to the Massachusetts House of Representatives, on November 30, 2021, in a special election following former Representative Brad Hill's appointment to the Massachusetts Gaming Commission. Belsito was the first Democrat to represent the 4th Essex district since 1858, and was sworn in on December 8, 2021. The district was eliminated in statewide redistricting at the end of the term.

Prior to running for the Massachusetts House of Representatives, Belsito ran for the United States House of Representatives, challenging Representative Seth Moulton in the Democratic primary for 6th District of Massachusetts. In 2014 she supported Moulton's Republican opponent, Richard Tisei, noting his endorsement from the American College of Obstetrics and Gynecologists (ACOG) and NARAL Pro-Choice Massachusetts. Her voter affiliation was Unenrolled until the election of Donald Trump in 2016. Moulton went on to win the primary, but endorsed Belsito in her campaign for the Massachusetts House of Representatives the next year.

Belsito founded the Maternal Mental Health Leadership Alliance in 2019 with accomplishments including a national maternal mental health hotline and legislation, funding, and establishment of a federal task force related to improving maternal mental health care.

In the final days of her term as a state representative, she accused Israel of genocide. She tweeted that the US should acknowledge the Israeli administration was "an apartheid run thuggery terrorist regime" and that "killing and land taking has nothing to do with anti-semitism. It is genocide."

== Personal life ==
Prior to running for office, she served on the Board of Trustees for Salem State University.

She is of Syrian, Irish and Acadian heritage and is the great-niece of USAF Technical Sergeant Richard B. Fitzgibbon Jr., the first American to die in the Vietnam War.

== Electoral history ==
Massachusetts's 6th congressional district Democratic Primary, 2020
Party	Candidate	Votes	%
Democratic	Seth Moulton (incumbent)	124,928	78.0
Democratic	Jamie Belsito	19,492	12.2
Democratic	Angus McQuilken	15,478	9.7
Total votes		159,898	100

Massachusetts House of Representatives, 4th Essex, 2021 special election primary
Party	Candidate	Votes	%
Democratic	Jamie Belsito	1,728	73.5
Democratic	Darcyll Dale	608	25.9
Total votes		2,336	100

Massachusetts House of Representatives, 4th Essex, 2021 special election
Party	Candidate	Votes	%
Democratic	Jamie Belsito	2,504	55.4
Republican	Bob Snow	2,017	44.6
Total votes		4,521	100

Topsfield Town Moderator, 2023
Party	Candidate	Votes	%
Nonpartisan	Jamie Belsito (unopposed)	1,093	100
Total votes		1.093	100

== See also ==
- 2021–2022 Massachusetts legislature
