= Larry Alexander (politician) =

American politician and lawyer

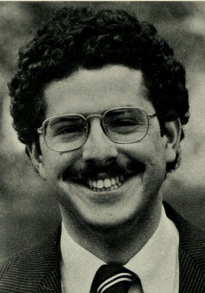
- Alexander c. 1983

Member of the Massachusetts House of Representatives
- In office 1979–1990

Personal details
- Party: Democratic
- Education: Yale University (A.B.); Boston University (J.D.)

Lawrence R. "Larry" Alexander (June 10, 1950 – November 6, 2012) was an American politician and lawyer.

Born on June 10, 1950, in Gardner, Massachusetts, Alexander received his bachelor's degree from Yale University and his Juris Doctor degree from Boston University School of Law. He was a member of the Massachusetts bar. Alexander wrote newspaper articles and a novel. He served in the Massachusetts House of Representatives from 1979 to 1991 as a Democrat.

== See also ==
- 1979–1980 Massachusetts legislature
- 1981–1982 Massachusetts legislature
- 1983–1984 Massachusetts legislature
- 1985–1986 Massachusetts legislature
- 1987–1988 Massachusetts legislature
- 1989–1990 Massachusetts legislature
- Massachusetts House of Representatives' 8th Essex district
