= Ryan Hamilton (Massachusetts politician) =

American politician

Member of the Massachusetts House of Representatives from the 15th Essex district
- Incumbent
- Assumed office January 4, 2023
- Preceded by: Linda Dean Campbell

Personal details
- Party: Democratic
- Education: University of Massachusetts Lowell
- Website: Official website

Ryan M. Hamilton is an American politician who has served as a member of the Massachusetts House of Representatives from the 15th Essex district since 2023.

== Career ==
Hamilton first won election to the Massachusetts House of Representatives in 2022. In October 2023, he proposed a bill that would require high schools to teach students about financial literacy, with underserved districts receiving money from the state to pay for the additional education.
