= Jenny Armini =

American politician

Member of the Massachusetts House of Representatives from the 8th Essex district
- Incumbent
- Assumed office January 18, 2023
- Preceded by: Lori A. Ehrlich

Personal details
- Party: Democratic
- Education: Endicott College (AA, Communications); University of Virginia (BA, American government and politics); Harvard Kennedy School (MPA)

Jennifer Balinsky Armini (/ɑːrˈmini/) is an American politician who is the member of the Massachusetts House of Representatives from the 8th Essex district. She was elected after winning a six-way Democratic primary in September 2022 and won the General Election uncontested.

== See also ==
- 2023–2024 Massachusetts legislature
