= Massachusetts Senate's 1st Essex district =

American legislative district

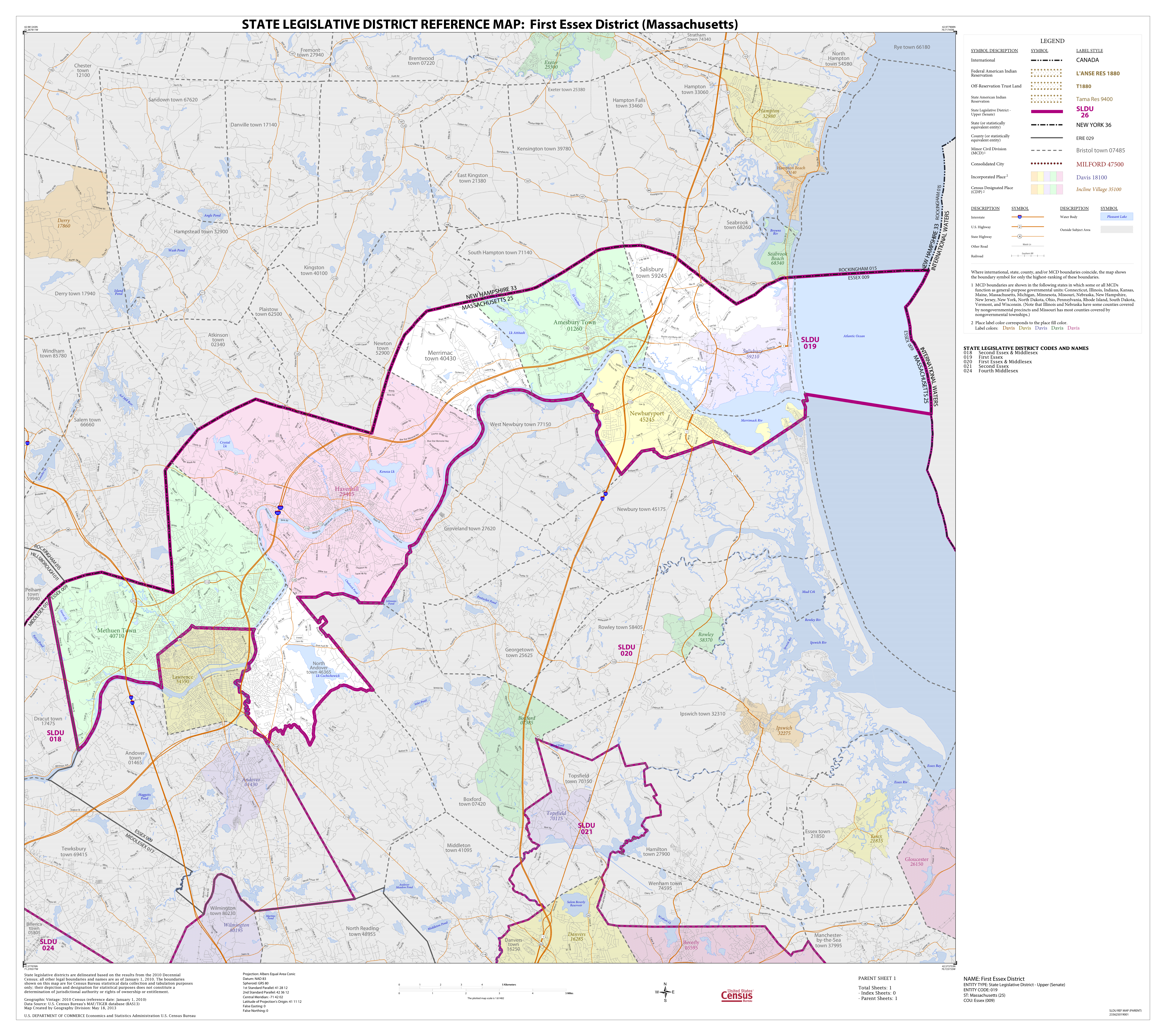
Map of Massachusetts Senate's 1st Essex district, based on the 2010 United States census.

Massachusetts Senate's 1st Essex district in the United States is one of 40 legislative districts of the Massachusetts Senate. It covers 23.0% of Essex county population. Democrat Pavel Payano of Lawrence has represented the district since 2023.

== Locales represented ==
The district includes the following localities:

- Amesbury
- Haverhill
- Merrimac
- Methuen
- Newburyport
- North Andover
- Salisbury

The current district geographic boundary overlaps with those of the Massachusetts House of Representatives' 1st Essex, 2nd Essex, 3rd Essex, 14th Essex, 15th Essex, and 17th Essex districts.

=== Towns formerly represented ===
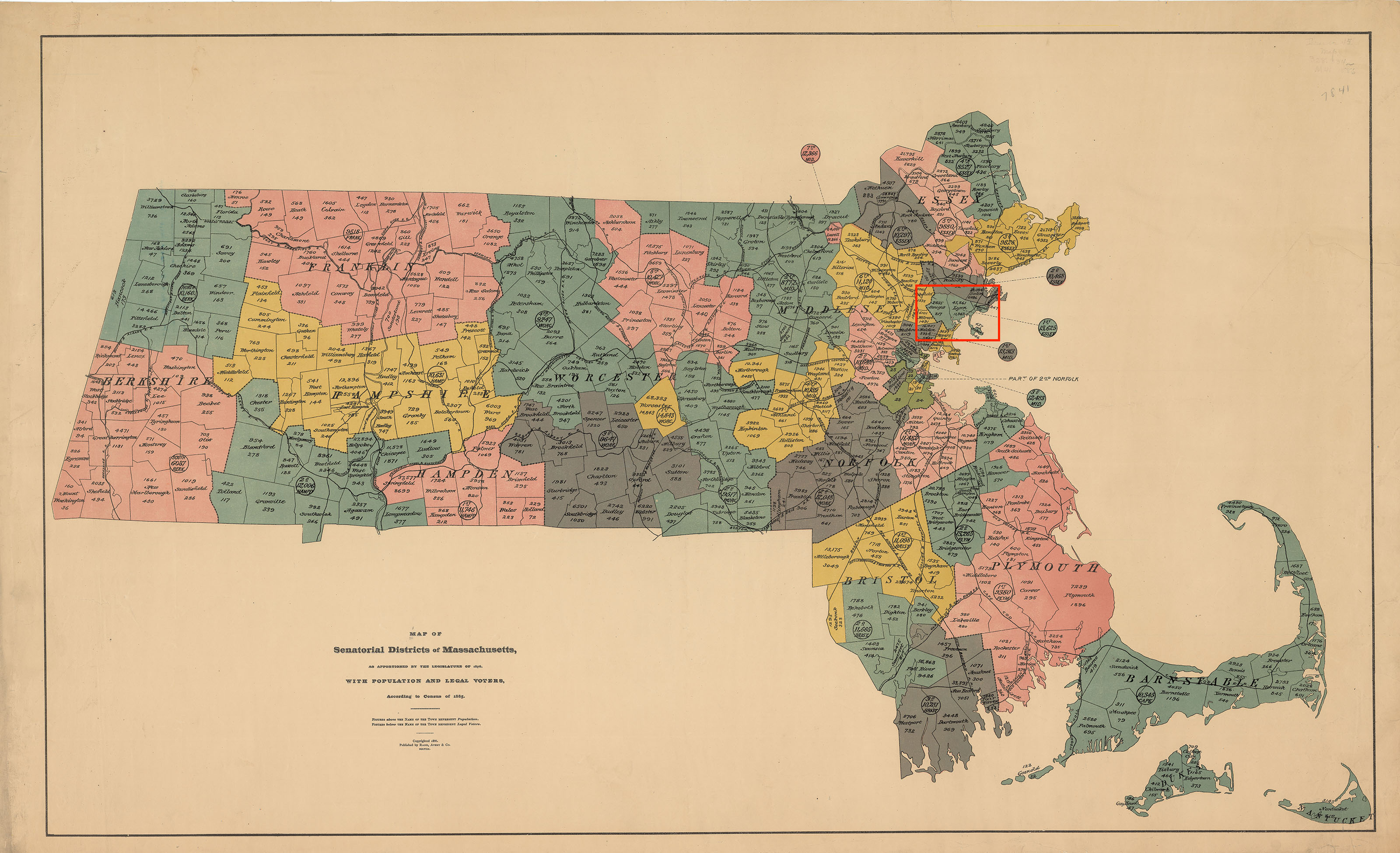
Map of the 1876 apportionment of the 1st Essex senatorial district

The district previously covered the following:

- Lynn, circa 1860s; circa 1948; circa 1987
- Lynnfield, circa 1860s; circa 1987
- Marblehead, circa 1860s; circa 1987
- Nahant, circa 1860s; circa 1948; circa 1987
- Saugus, circa 1860s; circa 1987
- Swampscott, circa 1860s; circa 1948; circa 1987

== List of senators ==
- William Fabens, circa 1859
- George H. Sweetser (1867, 1869)
- William Schouler (1868)
- Harmon Hall (1876, 1880–1881)
- John R. Baldwin (1882–1884)
- Eugene A. Bessom, circa 1894
- William Salter
- George Jackson
- Charles Benjamin Frothingham

Senator	Party	Years	Legis.	Electoral history	District towns
Albert Cole	Republican	1935 – 1940	149th 150th 151st	Elected in 1934. Re-elected in 1936. Re-elected in 1938. Resigned to become Mayor of Lynn.	
Charles V. Hogan	Democratic	1941 – August 7, 1971	152nd 153rd 154th 155th 156th 157th 158th 159th 160th 161st 162nd 163rd 164th 165th 166th 167th	Elected in 1940. Re-elected in 1942. Re-elected in 1944. Re-elected in 1946. Re-elected in 1948. Re-elected in 1950. Re-elected in 1952. Re-elected in 1954. Re-elected in 1956. Re-elected in 1958. Re-elected in 1960. Re-elected in 1962. Re-elected in 1964. Re-elected in 1966. Re-elected in 1968. Re-elected in 1970. Re-elected in 1972. Died.	
James J. Carrigan	Democratic	1972 – 1973	167th	Elected in 1972 special election. Lost Democratic primary in 1972.	
Walter J. Boverini	Democratic	1973 – 1995	168th 169th 170th 171st 172nd 173rd 174th 175th 176th 177th 178th	Elected in 1972. Re-elected in 1974. Re-elected in 1972. Re-elected in 1974. Re-elected in 1976. Re-elected in 1978. Re-elected in 1980. Re-elected in 1982. Re-elected in 1984. Re-elected in 1986. Re-elected in 1988. Re-elected in 1990. Re-elected in 1992. Retired	
Edward J. Clancy Jr.	Democratic	1995 – 2002	179th 180th 181st 182nd	Elected in 1994. Re-elected in 1996. Re-elected in 1998. Re-elected in 2000. Resigned in 2002 to become Mayor of Lynn.	
Thomas M. McGee	Democratic	2002 – 2003	182nd	Elected in 2002 special election. Redistricted to 3rd Essex and Middlesex district.	
Steven Baddour	Democratic	2003– April 2, 2012	183rd 184th 185th 186th 187th	Redistricted from 3rd Essex district. Re-elected in 2002. Re-elected in 2004. Re-elected in 2006. Re-elected in 2008. Re-elected in 2012. Resigned on April 2, 2012.	
Kathleen O'Connor Ives	Democratic	January 2013 – January 2, 2019	188th 189th 190th	Elected in 2012. Re-elected in 2014. Re-elected in 2016. Retired.	
Diana DiZoglio	Democratic	January 2019– January 2023	191st 192nd	Elected in 2018. Re-elected in 2020. Retired to run for Massachusetts State Auditor.	
Pavel Payano	Democratic	January 2023–	193rd	Elected in 2022.	

== Images ==
Portraits of legislators

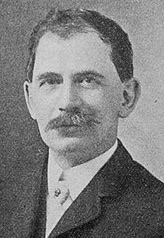
William Salter

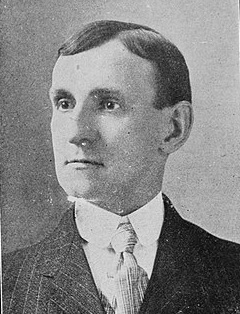
George Jackson

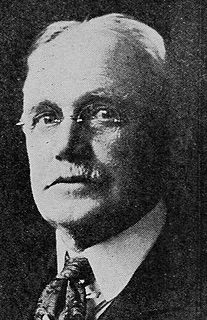
Charles Benjamin Frothingham

== See also ==
- List of Massachusetts Senate elections
- List of Massachusetts General Courts
- List of former districts of the Massachusetts Senate
- Other Essex County districts of the Massachusett Senate: 2nd, 3rd; 1st Essex and Middlesex; 2nd Essex and Middlesex
- Essex County districts of the Massachusetts House of Representatives: 1st, 2nd, 3rd, 4th, 5th, 6th, 7th, 8th, 9th, 10th, 11th, 12th, 13th, 14th, 15th, 16th, 17th, 18th
