= Sean Reid =

Sean Reid may refer to:

- Seán Reid (1907–1978) Irish musician.
- Sean Reid (politician), (b. 1995) American politician.
- Sean Read, member of the band Dexys Midnight Runners
