= Philip W. Johnston =

American businessman and politician (1944–2025)

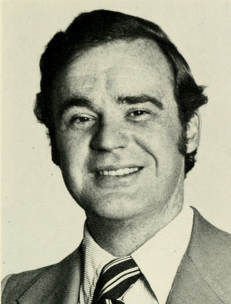
- Official portrait, circa 1983

Secretary of Health and Human Services of Massachusetts
- In office 1984–1991
- Governor: Michael Dukakis
- Preceded by: Manuel C. Carballo
- Succeeded by: David Forsberg

Member of the Massachusetts House of Representatives from the 4th Plymouth District
- In office 1979–1984
- Preceded by: Paul F. X. Moriarty
- Succeeded by: Frank Hynes

Member of the Massachusetts House of Representatives from the 10th Plymouth District
- In office 1975–1979
- Preceded by: Carl Ohlson
- Succeeded by: Michael C. Creedon

Chair of the Massachusetts Democratic Party
- In office 2000–2007
- Preceded by: Joan Menard
- Succeeded by: John E. Walsh

Personal details
- Born: July 21, 1944 Chelsea, Massachusetts, U.S.
- Died: April 5, 2025 (aged 80)
- Party: Democratic
- Education: University of Massachusetts Amherst; Harvard University
- Occupation: Businessman, politician

Philip W. Johnston (July 21, 1944 – April 5, 2025) was an American businessman and politician who was Secretary of Human Services in Massachusetts and Regional Administrator of Health and Human Services for New England.

== Early life and career ==
Johnston was born on July 21, 1944. He received a Bachelor of Arts degree from the University of Massachusetts Amherst and a Master of Arts degree from the John F. Kennedy School of Government at Harvard University.

In 1996, Johnston founded and was president of Johnston Associates, a communications and public affairs consulting firm. He was Chair of the Board of the Blue Cross and Blue Shield of Massachusetts Foundation, the Massachusetts Health Policy Forum, and the Robert F. Kennedy Center for Justice and Human Rights. He also sat on the Boards of the University of Massachusetts, the Kenneth B. Schwartz Center, the Robert F. Kennedy Children's Action Corps, the Massachusetts Medicaid Policy Institute, the Roosevelt Institute, and Stop Handgun Violence.

He was elected to the state legislature five times. From 1984 to 1991, he was Secretary of Human Services in the Commonwealth of Massachusetts under Governor Michael Dukakis. He was also executive director of the Robert F. Kennedy Memorial Center for Human Rights in Washington, D.C. In 1992, he was appointed by U.S. President Bill Clinton as the New England Director for the U.S. Department of Health and Human Services, where he served until 1996. Johnston was twice elected chair of the Massachusetts Democratic Party, in 2000 and 2004.

== 1996 Congressional election ==
In 1996, Johnston was a Democratic candidate for Congress in the 10th District of Massachusetts. Johnston was initially declared the winner, and an official recount in several contested towns preserved Johnston's victory, though by a narrower margin. Following the recount, Bill Delahunt sought judicial review in the Massachusetts Superior Court. Judge Elizabeth Donovan conducted a de novo review of the contested ballots and declared Delahunt the victor by a 108-vote margin. The case was appealed to the Massachusetts Supreme Judicial Court, which upheld the lower court ruling. The case is also noteworthy for the issue of "hanging chads" in punch-card voting machines, and was later referenced as a precedent by the Florida Supreme Court in Bush v. Gore during the 2000 United States presidential election recount in Florida.

== Death ==
Johnston died from a stroke on April 5, 2025, at the age of 80.

Party political offices
Preceded by Joan Menard	Chairman of the Massachusetts Democratic Party; 2000–2007	Succeeded by John E. Walsh
