= Peter Capano =

Massachusetts politician

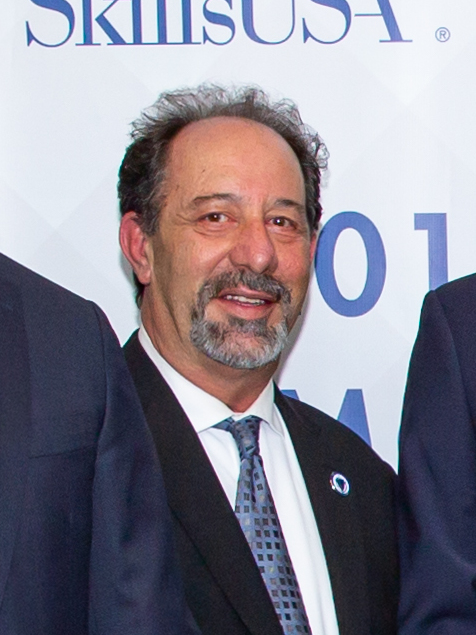
- Capano in 2019

Member of the Massachusetts House of Representatives from the 11th Essex district
- In office January 1, 2019 – January 1, 2025
- Preceded by: Brendan Crighton
- Succeeded by: Sean Reid

Personal details
- Party: Democratic Party
- Education: University of Massachusetts

Peter Capano is a state representative who represents the 11th Essex District in the Massachusetts House of Representatives. He represents the towns of Lynn, and Nahant. Capano serves on the Joint Committee on Cannabis Policy, Joint Committee on Housing, Joint Committee on Public Service, and the Joint Committee on Transportation . He is the founder of the New Lynn Coalition in Lynn, which has been led by Tanveer Malik as executive director since 2023, a coalition that brings together over 15 community and faith-based groups, as well as various labor unions. This union aims to collectively empower the working-class community in Lynn.

== Early life and education ==
Capano served in the United States Army from 1976 to 1979. He received a bachelor's degree in labor studies from the University of Massachusetts Boston.

== Career ==
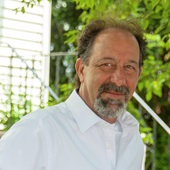
Official portrait

Before being elected to the state legislature in 2018, Capano served as president of Local 201 of the IUE- CWA and as a member of the Lynn City Council. Capano had been serving on the city council since 2005.

== See also ==
- 2019–2020 Massachusetts legislature
- 2021–2022 Massachusetts legislature
