= 1998 Massachusetts elections =

- November 3, 1998

Part of the 1998 United States elections

A Massachusetts general election was held on November 3, 1998 in the Commonwealth of Massachusetts.

The election included:

- statewide elections for governor, lieutenant governor, attorney general, Secretary of the Commonwealth, treasurer, and auditor;
- district elections for U.S. Representatives, State Representatives, State Senators, and Governor's Councillors; and
- ballot questions at the state and local levels.

Democratic and Republican candidates were selected in party primaries held September 15, 1998.

== Governor & Lieutenant Governor ==
Republicans Paul Cellucci and Jane M. Swift were elected Governor and Lieutenant Governor, respectively, over Democratic candidates Scott Harshbarger and Warren Tolman, and Libertarian candidates Dean Cook and Eli Israel.

== Attorney general ==
Incumbent Attorney General Scott Harshbarger did not run for re-election. Middlesex County District Attorney Thomas Reilly defeated State Senator Lois Pines in the Democratic primary and Middlesex County Sheriff Brad Bailey in the general election.

=== Democratic primary ===
==== Candidates ====
- Lois Pines, State Senator from Newton
- Thomas Reilly, Middlesex County District Attorney

==== Results ====
Massachusetts Attorney General Democratic primary, 1998
Party	Candidate	Votes	%	±%
Democratic	Thomas Reilly	309,332	52.67%	
Democratic	Lois Pines	277,588	47.27%	
Write-in		379	0.07%	

=== General election ===
Massachusetts Attorney General Election, 1998
Party	Candidate	Votes	%	±%
Democratic	Thomas Reilly	1,218,244	66.77%	
Republican	Brad Bailey	604,700	33.14%	
Write-in		1,602	0.09%	

== Secretary of the Commonwealth ==
Democrat William F. Galvin was re-elected Secretary of the Commonwealth. He defeated Republican Dale C. Jenkins and Libertarian David Atkinson in the general election.

Massachusetts Secretary of the Commonwealth Election, 1998
Party	Candidate	Votes	%	±%
Democratic	William F. Galvin (incumbent)	1,249,307	70.02%	
Republican	Dale C. Jenkins	448,972	25.17%	
Libertarian	David Atkinson	85,846	4.81%	

== Treasurer and Receiver-General ==
Incumbent Treasurer and Receiver-General Joe Malone did not run for re-election. Former State Representative Shannon O'Brien defeated Republican Robert Maginn and Libertarian Merton B. Baker in the general election.

Massachusetts Treasurer and Receiver-General Election, 1998
Party	Candidate	Votes	%	±%
Democratic	Shannon O'Brien	1,120,757	62.23	
Republican	Robert Maginn	626,286	34.77	
Libertarian	Merton B. Baker	53,299	2.96	
Write-in		675	0.04	

== Auditor ==
Democrat A. Joseph DeNucci was re-elected Auditor. He defeated Republican Michael Duffy and Libertarian Carla Howell.

Massachusetts Auditor Election, 1998
Party	Candidate	Votes	%	±%
Democratic	A. Joseph DeNucci (incumbent)	1,152,193	64.61	
Republican	Michael Duffy	529,571	29.70	
Libertarian	Carla Howell	101,498	5.69	

== Ballot questions ==
There were four statewide ballot questions, which the Massachusetts voters voted on this election. All were approved. There were also various local ballot questions around the state.

Statewide Questions:

- Question 1 - Administration of government. A constitutional amendment that would prevent the legislature from altering its own base pay.
- Question 2 - Elections and campaigns. A law that would create a new state agency would fund campaigns for all state offices.
- Question 3 - Taxes. A law that would cut the state income tax rate on interest and dividend income.
- Question 4 - Business Regulation. A law that, starting in March 1998 would allow customers to choose to buy power from separate generating companies, instead of buying power from the utility that owns the power lines.
