= Steven Walsh =

American politician (born 1973)

Steve Walsh

President and CEO, Massachusetts Health & Hospital Association
- Incumbent
- Assumed office 2017

President and CEO, Massachusetts Council of Community Hospitals
- In office 2014–2017

Member of the Massachusetts House of Representatives from the 11th Essex district
- In office 2005 – January 2014
- Preceded by: Thomas M. McGee
- Succeeded by: Brendan Crighton

Personal details
- Born: September 11, 1973 (age 53) Boston, Massachusetts
- Party: Democratic
- Education: Harvard Kennedy School; Wesleyan University; New England Law Boston
- Occupation: Healthcare Advocate; Attorney; Former Politician

Steve Walsh (born September 11, 1973, in Boston, Massachusetts ) is the president and CEO of the American Hospital Association. He is a former member of the Massachusetts House of Representatives and the former president and CEO of the Massachusetts Health & Hospital Association.

Walsh has served as president and CEO of the American Hospital Association since the fall of 2026. The AHA represents nearly 5,000 hospitals and care providers in the United States.

Walsh represented the 11th Essex District in the Massachusetts House of Representatives for six terms from 2005 to 2014. As House Chair of the Joint Committee on Health Care Financing, he oversaw passage of Chapter 224, which introduced new cost measurement tools, incentivized alternative payment methods and community health investments, and encouraged patient empowerment and primary care. He resigned in January 2014 to become executive director of the Massachusetts Council of Community Hospitals.

Walsh was named president and CEO of the Massachusetts Health & Hospital Association (MHA) in September 2017 and served in the role until fall of 2026. Under his leadership, the association was recognized for its efforts to support and grow the healthcare workforce, establish new partnerships with advocates and health plans, and help hospitals address crises such as the COVID-19 pandemic and the Steward Health Care bankruptcy.

Walsh received a Master of Public Administration from the Harvard Kennedy School, a J.D. from the New England School of Law, and a B.A. from Wesleyan University.
