= Massachusetts House of Representatives' 3rd Essex district =

American legislative district

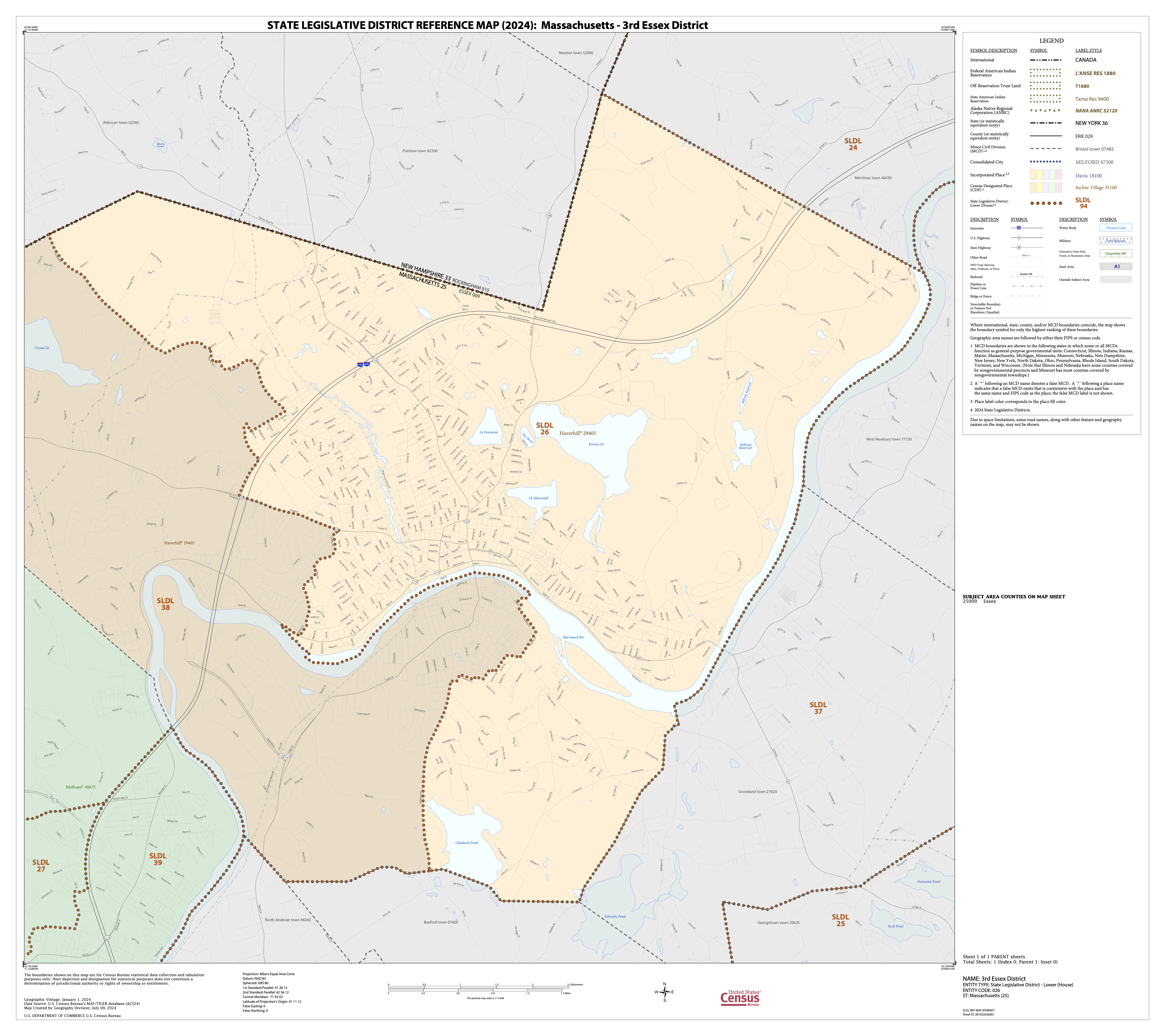
Map of Massachusetts House of Representatives' 3rd Essex district, based on the 2020 United States census.

Massachusetts House of Representatives' 3rd Essex district is one of 160 districts included in the lower house of the Massachusetts General Court. It covers part of the city of Haverhill in Essex County. Democrat Andy Vargas of Haverhill has represented the district since 2017.

The current district geographic boundary overlaps with that of the Massachusetts Senate's 1st Essex district.

== Representatives ==
- Francis M. Dodge, circa 1858
- Robert S. Rantoul, circa 1858
- James Hill, circa 1859
- Thomas A. Morgan, circa 1859
- Albert L. Dame, circa 1888
- William H. Poore, circa 1888
- Essex S. Abbott, circa 1920
- Katherine Alena Foley, 1935-1938
- Charles H. Anthony, circa 1951
- Charles Sumner Marston, 3rd, circa 1951

Member	Party	Years	Legis.	Electoral history	District towns
Francis W. Hatch Jr.	Republican	1971 – 1979	169th 169th 170th 171st	Re-elected in 1970. Re-elected in 1972. Re-elected in 1974. Re-elected in 1976. Ran for Governor in 1978.	1971–79: Manchester-by-the-Sea, Wenham, and parts of Beverly
Francis Bevilacqua	Democratic	1979 – 1981	172nd	Redistricted from 16th Essex district. Re-elected in 1978. Lost Democratic primary in 1980.	
Frank Emilio	Democratic	1981 – 1991	173rd 174th 174th 175th 176th 177th	Elected in 1980. Re-elected in 1982. Re-elected in 1984. Re-elected in 1986. Re-elected in 1988. Lost Democratic primary in 1990.	
Brian Dempsey	Democratic	1991 – July 17, 2017	178th 179th 180th 181st 182nd 183rd 184th 185th 186th 187th 188th 189th 190th	Elected in 1990. Re-elected in 1992. Re-elected in 1994. Re-elected in 1996. Re-elected in 1998. Re-elected in 2000. Re-elected in 2002. Re-elected in 2004. Re-elected in 2006. Re-elected in 2008. Re-elected in 2010. Resigned July 17, 2017.	
Brian Dempsey	Democratic	1991 – July 17, 2017	178th 179th 180th 181st 182nd 183rd 184th 185th 186th 187th 188th 189th 190th	Elected in 1990. Re-elected in 1992. Re-elected in 1994. Re-elected in 1996. Re-elected in 1998. Re-elected in 2000. Re-elected in 2002. Re-elected in 2004. Re-elected in 2006. Re-elected in 2008. Re-elected in 2010. Resigned July 17, 2017.	2013–: parts of Haverhill
Andy Vargas	Democratic	November 2017 –	190th 191st 192nd	Elected in 2017. Re-elected in 2018. Re-elected in 2020. Re-elected in 2022. Re-elected in 2024.	2013–: parts of Haverhill
Andy Vargas	Democratic	November 2017 –	190th 191st 192nd	Elected in 2017. Re-elected in 2018. Re-elected in 2020. Re-elected in 2022. Re-elected in 2024.	2023–: parts of Haverhill

== Former locales ==
The district previously covered:

- Lawrence, circa 1872
- Methuen, circa 1872

== See also ==
- List of Massachusetts House of Representatives elections
- Other Essex County districts of the Massachusetts House of Representatives: 1st, 2nd, 4th, 5th, 6th, 7th, 8th, 9th, 10th, 11th, 12th, 13th, 14th, 15th, 16th, 17th, 18th
- Essex County districts of the Massachusett Senate: 1st, 2nd, 3rd; 1st Essex and Middlesex; 2nd Essex and Middlesex
- List of Massachusetts General Courts
- List of former districts of the Massachusetts House of Representatives

== Images ==
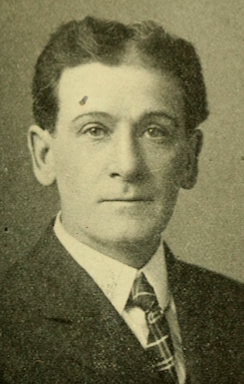
Leslie Morse

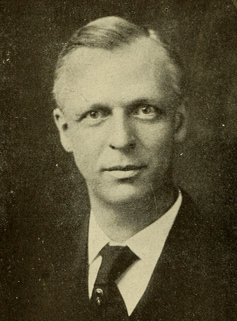
Essex Abbott

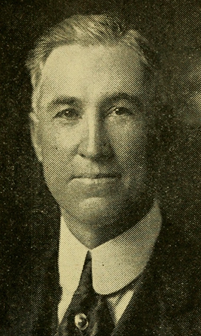
Joseph Curtis

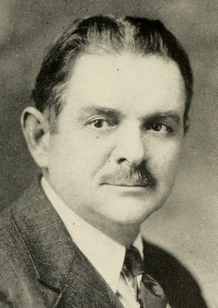
Carl Woekel

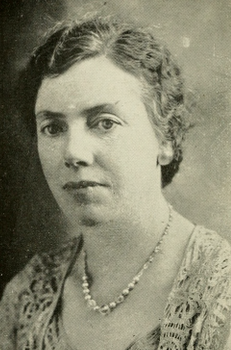
Katherine Alena Foley

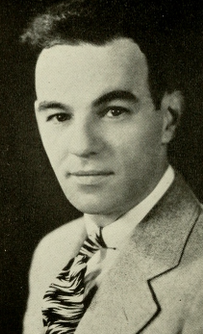
Louis Scanlon

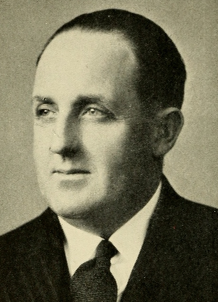
Harvey Pothier

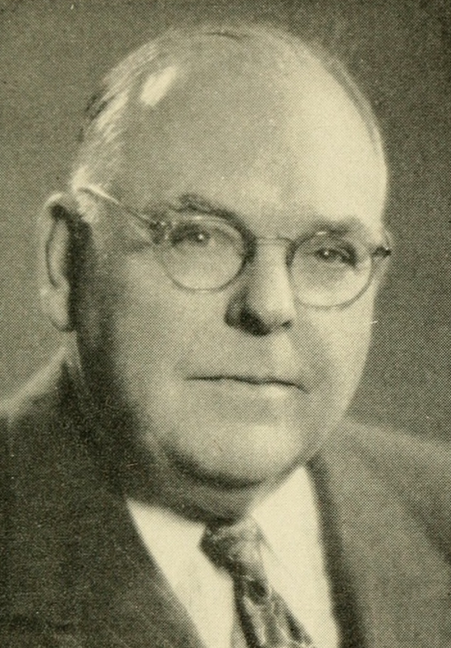
Charles Anthony

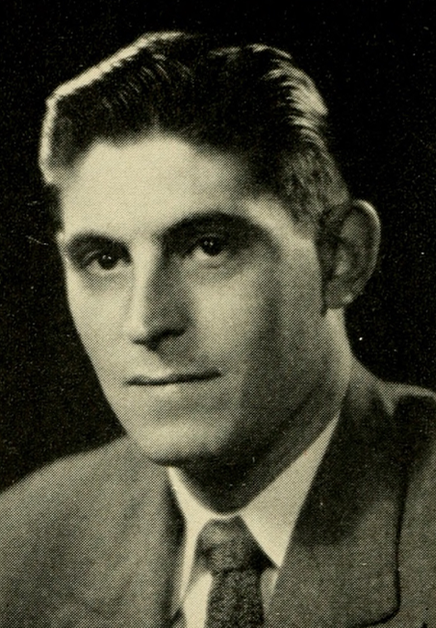
Charles Sumner

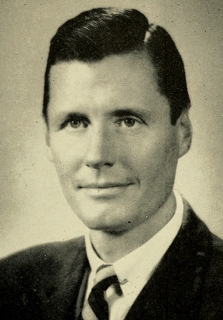
Francis Hatch

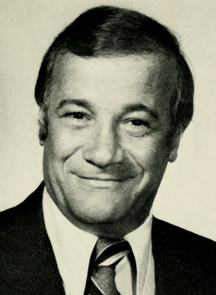
Frank Emilio

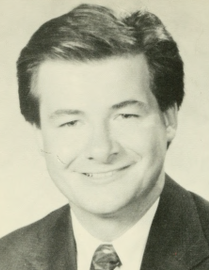
Brian Dempsey
