= Brian Dempsey (politician) =

American politician

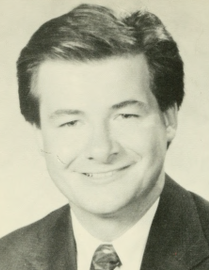
- Portrait of Brian Dempsey

Chair of the Ways and Means Committee of the Massachusetts House of Representatives
- In office January 28, 2011 – July 17, 2017
- Preceded by: Charles Murphy
- Succeeded by: Jeffrey Sanchez

Member of the Massachusetts House of Representatives from the 3rd Essex district
- In office 1991 – July 19, 2017
- Preceded by: Frank Emilio
- Succeeded by: Andy Vargas

Personal details
- Born: September 30, 1966 (age 60) Haverhill, Massachusetts
- Party: Democratic
- Spouse: Julie Dempsey
- Education: Norwich University; University of Massachusetts Lowell
- Occupation: Marketing/Public Relations; Insurance Broker

Brian S. Dempsey (born September 30, 1966, in Haverhill, Massachusetts) is an American politician who represented the 3rd Essex district in the Massachusetts House of Representatives from 1991 to 2017. At the time of his resignation in 2017, he was the Chairman of the House Ways and Means Committee.

Prior to serving in the House, Dempsey was a member of the Haverhill City Council from 1988 to 1991.
