= Robert Maginn =

American businessman and political leader

Chair of the Massachusetts Republican Party
- In office 2011–2013
- Preceded by: Jennifer Nassour
- Succeeded by: Kirsten Hughes

Personal details
- Born: October 31, 1956 (age 69)
- Party: Republican
- Spouse: Chai Ling (m. 2001)
- Children: 3
- Education: University of Dayton (BS); Harvard University (MDiv, MBA, ALM)

Robert A. Maginn Jr. (born October 31, 1956) is an American businessman and political figure who served as the chairman of the Massachusetts Republican Party from 2011 to 2013.

== Education ==
Maginn graduated summa cum laude from the University of Dayton with a B.S. in business administration and received three graduate degrees from Harvard University, including a Master of Divinity (MDiv) from Harvard Divinity School, Master of Business Administration (MBA) with honors from Harvard Business School and Master of Liberal Arts (ALM) in government from Harvard Extension School.

== Career ==
=== Business ===
From 1983 to 2000, Maginn worked for Bain & Company as a management consultant and later as a senior partner, board member, and director. From 1997-2001, he was a director of iBasis. In 1998, he co-founded Jenzabar, an internet company that provides software to colleges and universities, as chairman of the Board of Directors and CEO. Maginn is an operating partner at Energy Impact Partners, and a fellow at Harvard University Advanced Leadership Initiative.

From 2006 to 2010, he was a non-executive director, chairman of the Nominating & Corporate Governance Committee, member of the Audit Committee and member of Compensation Committee at ICx Technologies. He was also chairman of New Media Japan and managing member of New Media Investors, LLC.

=== Politics ===
Maginn served as a member of the Republican Board of Governors and on Bob Dole, Mitt Romney, and Peter Torkildsen's finance committees. In 1998, Maginn was the Republican nominee for Treasurer and Receiver-General of Massachusetts. He lost to Democrat Shannon O'Brien 626,286 votes to 1,120,757.

On December 1, 2011, Maginn was elected Chairman of the Massachusetts Republican Party. He defeated former United States Attorney Frank L. McNamara Jr. 51 votes to 21. Maginn announced that he would not seek reelection as party chairman in 2013 following the defeat of Republican Presidential candidate W. Mitt Romney his former boss and friend.

=== Legal Affairs ===
In June 2017, three investors of New Media Investors II-B LLC filed a suit against Maginn, accusing him of breaching his fiduciary duty by failing to ensure the exercise of Jenzabar stock warrants. In March 2022, Maginn was found liable and was revealed to have reaped nearly $81 million in profits from stock warrants intended for investors. In November 2022, he was ordered by the Delaware Court of Chancery to pay $25.5 million in damages to investors from whom he had usurped the opportunity to buy stock in the company.

== Personal life ==
His father, Robert A. Maginn, Sr. is a chemical engineer and was the president of Midwestern Consolidated Enterprises Inc., a plastics manufacturer located in Dayton, Ohio. His mother, Valerie Maginn, was the company's vice president.

Maginn married his first wife in 1987. In 2001, Maginn married Chai Ling, one of the student leaders of the Tian'anmen Square protests of 1989 and the founder of All Girls Allowed, a humanitarian organization that aims to stop the human rights violations related to China's One-Child Policy. They have three daughters and reside in Belmont, Massachusetts.

Party political offices
Preceded by Joe Malone	Republican nominee for Treasurer and Receiver-General of Massachusetts; 1998	Succeeded by Daniel Grabauskas
Preceded by Jennifer Nassour	Chairman of the Massachusetts Republican Party; 2011–2013	Succeeded by Kirsten Hughes
