= Charles V. Hogan =

American politician

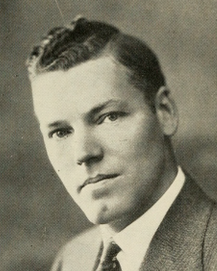
- Hogan c. 1935

Member of the Massachusetts Senate from the 1st Essex District
- In office 1941–1971
- Preceded by: Albert Cole
- Succeeded by: James J. Carrigan

Personal details
- Born: April 12, 1897 Lynn, Massachusetts
- Died: August 7, 1971 (aged 74) Lynn, Massachusetts
- Party: Democratic
- Education: Suffolk University Law School
- Occupation: Lawyer; Politician

Charles V. Hogan was an American politician who represented the 1st Essex District in the Massachusetts Senate for over 30 years.

== Early life ==
Hogan was born on April 12, 1897, in Lynn, Massachusetts. He graduated from Suffolk University Law School in 1921.

== Political career ==
Hogan was a member of the Massachusetts House of Representatives from 1935 to 1941. In 1940, he was elected to the Massachusetts Senate. He represented the 1st Essex District, which consisted of Lynn, Nahant, and Swampscott. He remained in the Senate until his death on August 7, 1971.

== See also ==
- Massachusetts legislature: 1935–1936, 1937–1938, 1939, 1941–1942, 1943–1944, 1947–1948, 1949–1950, 1951–1952, 1955–1956
