= Massachusetts Senate's 3rd Essex district =

American legislative district

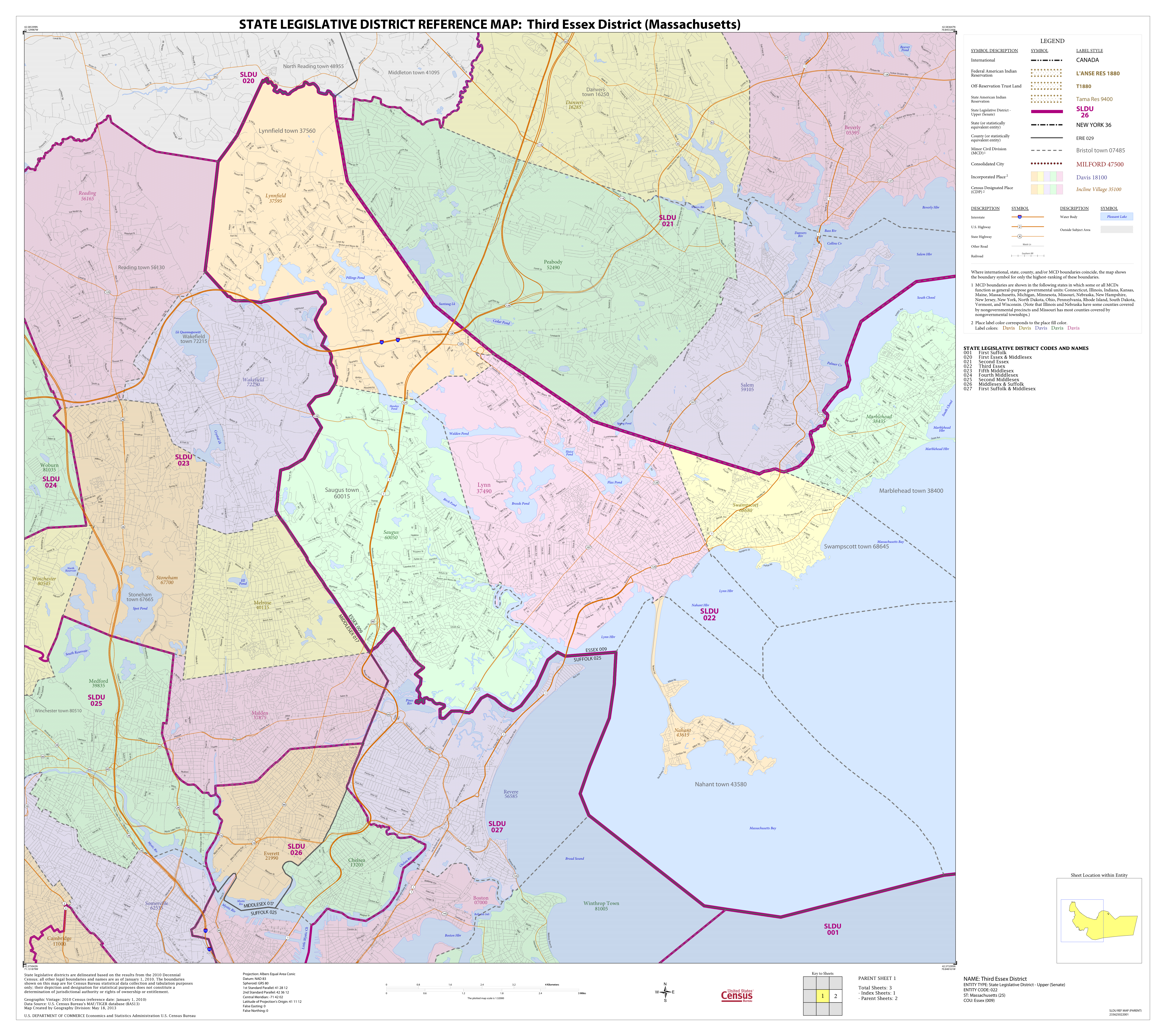
Map of Massachusetts Senate's 3rd Essex district, based on the 2010 United States census.

Massachusetts Senate's 3rd Essex district in the United States is one of 40 legislative districts of the Massachusetts Senate. It covers portions of Essex county. Democrat Brendan Crighton of Lynn has represented the district since 2018.

== Locales represented ==
The district includes the following localities:

- Lynn
- Lynnfield
- Marblehead
- Nahant
- Saugus
- Swampscott

The current district geographic boundary overlaps with those of the Massachusetts House of Representatives' 8th Essex, 9th Essex, 10th Essex, 11th Essex, 20th Middlesex, and 16th Suffolk districts.

=== Former locales ===
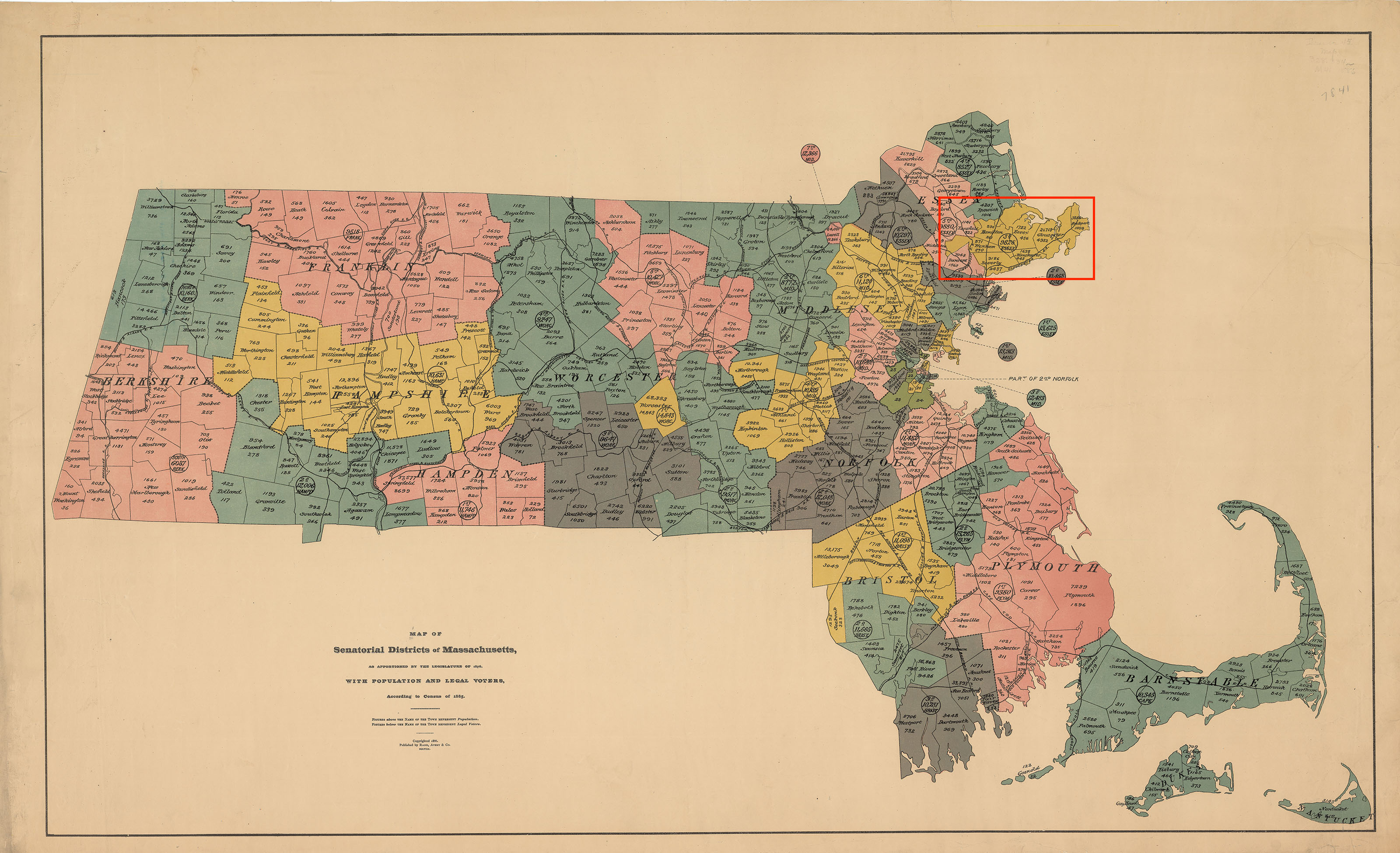
Map of the 1876 apportionment of the 3rd Essex senatorial district

The district previously covered the following:

- Andover, circa 1860s
- Boxford, circa 1860s
- Haverhill, circa 1860s
- Lawrence, circa 1860s
- Methuen, circa 1860s
- North Andover, circa 1860s

== Senators ==
- George L. Davis, circa 1859
- Horace C. Bacon, circa 1874
- James Shaw
- Charles Donnell Brown
- John Stoddart
- Cornelius F. Haley, circa 1935-1945

Senator	Party	Years	Legis.	Electoral history	District towns
Philip A. Graham	Republican	1951 – 1967	157th 158th 159th 160th 161st 162nd 163rd 164th	Elected in 1950. Re-elected in 1952. Re-elected in 1954. Re-elected in 1956. Re-elected in 1958. Re-elected in 1960. Re-elected in 1962. Re-elected in 1964.	
William L. Saltonstall	Republican	1967 – 1975	165th 166th 167th 168th	Elected in 1966. Re-elected in 1968. Re-elected in 1970. Re-elected in 1972. Redistricted to 1st Essex and Middlesex district.	
James Rurak	Democratic	1975 – 1977	169th	Redistricted from 4th Essex district. Elected in 1974. Lost Democratic primary in 1976.	
Sharon Pollard	Democratic	1977 – 1983	170th 171st 172nd 173rd	Elected in 1976. Re-elected in 1978. Re-elected in 1980. Re-elected in 1982. Resigned to become Massachusetts Secretary of Energy.	
Nicholas J. Costello	Democratic	1983 – 1991	173rd 174th 175th 176th	Elected in 1983 special election. Re-elected in 1982. Re-elected in 1984. Re-elected in 1986. Re-elected in 1988.	
James Jajuga	Democratic	1991 – 2001	177th 178th 179th 180th 181st 182nd	Elected in 1990. Re-elected in 1992. Re-elected in 1994. Re-elected in 1996. Re-elected in 1998. Re-elected in 2000. Resigned to become Massachusetts Secretary of Public Safety.	
Steven Baddour	Democratic	2002 – 2003	182nd	Elected in 2001 special election. Redistricted to 1st Essex district.	
District eliminated in 2003. District restored in 2013.
Thomas M. McGee	Democratic	January 2003 – 2018	188th 189th 190th	Redistricted from 3rd Essex and Middlesex district. Re-elected in 2002. Re-elected in 2004. Re-elected in 2006. Re-elected in 2008. Re-elected in 2010. Re-elected in 2012. Re-elected in 2014. Re-elected in 2016. Resigned to become Mayor of Lynn.	2013–23: Lynn, Lynnfield, Marblehead, Nahant, Saugus, and Swampscott
Brendan Crighton	Democratic	March 7, 2018–	190th 191st 192nd	Elected in 2018 special election. Re-elected in 2018. Re-elected in 2020.	2013–23: Lynn, Lynnfield, Marblehead, Nahant, Saugus, and Swampscott

== Images ==
Portraits of legislators

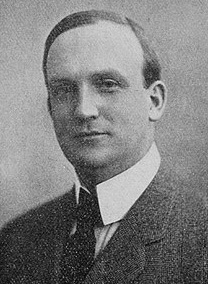
James Shaw

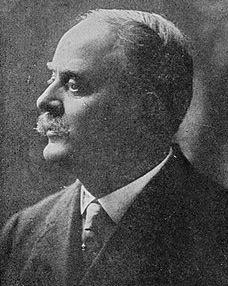
Charles Donnell Brown

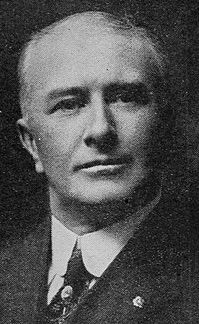
John Stoddart

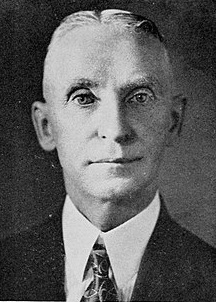
Cornelius Haley

== See also ==
- List of Massachusetts Senate elections
- List of Massachusetts General Courts
- List of former districts of the Massachusetts Senate
- Other Essex County districts of the Massachusett Senate: 1st, 2nd; 1st Essex and Middlesex; 2nd Essex and Middlesex
- Essex County districts of the Massachusetts House of Representatives: 1st, 2nd, 3rd, 4th, 5th, 6th, 7th, 8th, 9th, 10th, 11th, 12th, 13th, 14th, 15th, 16th, 17th, 18th
