= Andy Vargas =

Massachusetts politician

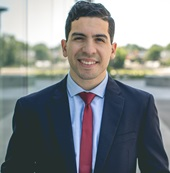
- Vargas in 2017

Member of the Massachusetts House of Representatives from the 3rd Essex district
- Incumbent
- Assumed office November 2017
- Preceded by: Brian Dempsey

Personal details
- Party: Democratic
- Education: Boston University

Andres X. "Andy" Vargas is an American politician serving as a member of the Massachusetts House of Representatives from the 3rd Essex district. A member of the Democratic Party, his district covers part of the city of Haverhill. Vargas serves as Chairperson of the Joint Committee on Community Development and Small Businesses. He is chair of the Massachusetts Black and Latino Legislative Caucus and a member of Phi Iota Alpha fraternity.

Vargas won a special election to the House of Representatives in 2017 upon the resignation of longtime incumbent Brian Dempsey. He defeated school committeeman Paul Magliocchetti in the primary, and Republican nominee Shaun Toohey in the general election. Vargas has run unopposed in every election since 2018.

In August 2021, Vargas announced his candidacy for the State Senate seat being vacated by incumbent Diana DiZoglio, who was retiring to run for state auditor. However, due to redistricting, Vargas withdrew his candidacy and instead successfully ran for re-election to the House.

Vargas is a proponent of increasing the housing supply in Massachusetts. He was a member of "YIMBYs For Harris."

== See also ==
- 2019–2020 Massachusetts legislature
- 2021–2022 Massachusetts legislature
