= Sean Reid (politician) =

U.S. politician (born 1995)

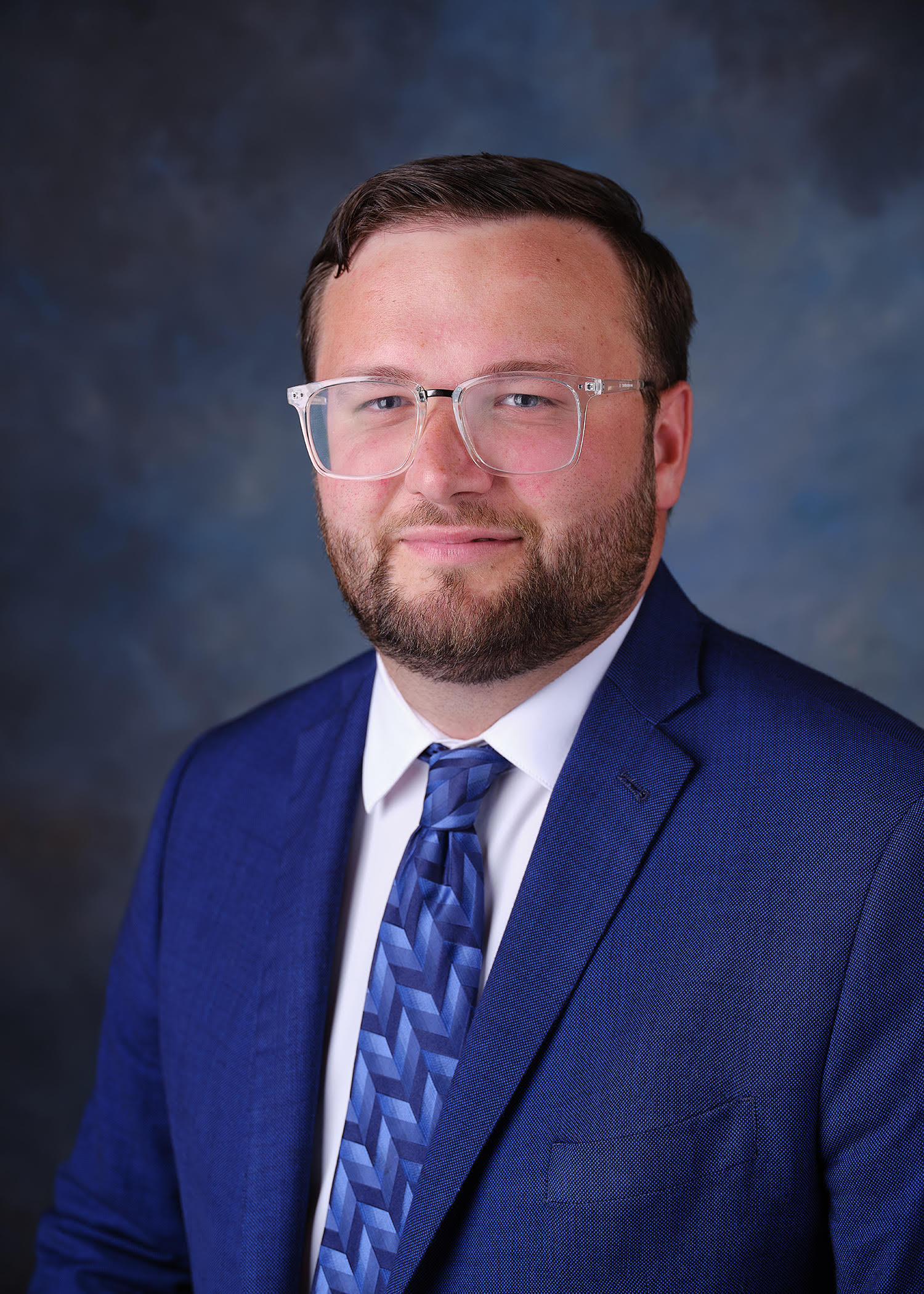

Member of the Massachusetts House of Representatives from the 11th Essex district
- Incumbent
- Assumed office January 1, 2025
- Preceded by: Peter Capano

Personal details
- Born: May 19, 1995 (age 31) Lynn, Massachusetts, U.S.
- Party: Democratic
- Education: North Shore Community College; Amherst College

Sean Reid is an American politician who serves as a member of the Massachusetts House of Representatives for the 11th Essex district. A member of the Democratic Party, his district includes Nahant and a part of Lynn. Reid previously served as a member of the Lynn School Committee.

== Education and career ==
Reid was born and raised in Lynn, Massachusetts, where he attended public schools and graduated from Lynn Classical High School. He went on to earn degrees from North Shore Community College and Amherst College.

Reid’s first experience in government was as a constituent services intern for Governor Deval Patrick. He later worked for State Senator Brendan Crighton, serving in various roles, including communications director, district director, and legislative director.

Reid has been involved in a number of community organizations such as serving on the boards of My Brother’s Table and the YMCA of Metro North and is a co-founder of Kayak and Sail Lynn.

== Political career ==
As a first-time candidate, Reid was the top vote-getter in a field of twelve candidates for the Lynn School Committee.

In 2024, Reid successfully ran for the Massachusetts House of Representatives, winning the seat held by retiring Representative Peter Capano. He defeated Lynn City Councilor-at-Large Hong Net in the Democratic primary and was unopposed in the general election.

=== Committee assignments ===
- House Committee on Steering, Policy and Scheduling
- Joint Committee on Mental Health, Substance Use and Recovery
- Joint Committee on Public Health
- Joint Committee on Telecommunications, Utilities and Energy

== Personal life ==
Reid lives in West Lynn with his wife, Kelsey, a special education teacher in Lynn Public Schools, and their son, Jack.

As a child, Reid experienced housing insecurity and lived in a family shelter in Lynn.
