= John E. Walsh =

American political consultant and campaign manager (1958–2023)

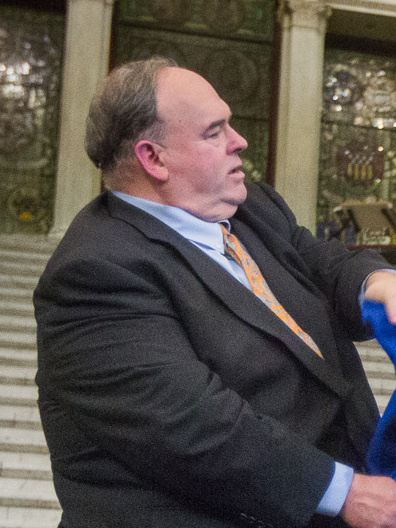
- Walsh in 2015

Chair of the Massachusetts Democratic Party
- In office 2007–2013
- Preceded by: Philip W. Johnston
- Succeeded by: Thomas M. McGee

Personal details
- Born: John Edward Walsh; April 14, 1958 Brockton, Massachusetts, U.S.
- Died: November 20, 2023 (aged 65)
- Party: Democratic
- Spouse: Donna Akins (m. 1993)
- Children: 1
- Education: Princeton University

John Edward Walsh (April 14, 1958 – November 20, 2023) was an American political consultant and campaign manager who managed Deval Patrick's successful 2006 Massachusetts gubernatorial run and Ed Markey's successful 2020 United States Senate reelection campaign. He was chairman of the Massachusetts Democratic Party from 2007 to 2013 and, from 2020 to 2023, was Markey's chief of staff.

== Early life ==
Walsh was born on April 14, 1958, in Brockton Hospital, and grew up in Abington, Massachusetts. He was the second of three siblings born to Irish immigrants John and Peggy Predenville Walsh. His father worked as a janitor at Regis College and had a side landscaping business, and his mother was a nurse's aide. He graduated from Cardinal Spellman High School and Princeton University. He was an offensive lineman on the Princeton Tigers football team.

After graduating, Walsh returned to Abington. He worked in the insurance business, first for John Hancock and later ran his own agency, Independence Insurance.

== Political career ==
Walsh's political career began shortly after he graduated from college when he helped a friend who was running for the Abington School Committee. Although his friend lost a close race to an incumbent, Walsh was appointed to the Abington finance committee. At the age of 26, he was elected to the Abington Board of Selectmen, where he would serve from 1983 to 1993. He also spent three years as a member of the Plymouth County Charter Commission.

During the 1998 Massachusetts gubernatorial election, Walsh served as field director of Brian J. Donnelly's campaign. In 2002, he was the campaign manager for the Massachusetts Democratic Party's Coordinated Campaign. Walsh served as Deval Patrick's campaign manager during his successful 2006 Massachusetts gubernatorial run and was also the director of his transition team. David Axelrod, a campaign advisor to Barack Obama, described Patrick's 2006 campaign as a model for Obama's 2008 presidential campaign.

From 2007 to 2013, Walsh was chairman of the Massachusetts Democratic Party. During his tenure as chairman, Democrat Martha Coakley was upset by Republican Scott Brown in the 2010 United States Senate special election. After this loss, Walsh oversaw the party's grassroots campaign that helped Senate candidates Elizabeth Warren and Edward Markey win in 2012 and 2013, respectively. The Democrats also retained control over the state's entire US House delegation, all statewide elected offices, and a supermajority in both houses of the State Legislature. Walsh resigned as chairman to become executive director of Deval Patrick's Together PAC.

In 2015, Walsh formed Walsh Strategies, a political consulting business.

Walsh was a senior advisor to Setti Warren's short-lived 2018 Massachusetts gubernatorial campaign.

In the fall of 2018, Walsh was a founder and the treasurer of Reason To Believe PAC, an organization established to support progressive Democrats and grassroots political efforts nationwide in the 2018 election cycle.

Walsh managed United States Senator Ed Markey's successful 2020 reelection campaign. Following the election, he became Markey's chief of staff.

== Personal life ==
In 1993, Walsh married Donna Akins, an information security compliance analyst. They had one son, Coleman. In 2014, the Walshes moved to Boston's Dorchester neighborhood. They also owned a residence in Falmouth, Massachusetts.

=== Health and death ===
Walsh had a mild heart attack in 2010. In 2023, he was diagnosed with stomach cancer, and died under hospice care on November 20, at the age of 65.

Party political offices
Preceded by Philip W. Johnston	Chairman of the Massachusetts Democratic Party; 2007–2013	Succeeded by Thomas M. McGee
