= Massachusetts House of Representatives' 18th Essex district =

American legislative district

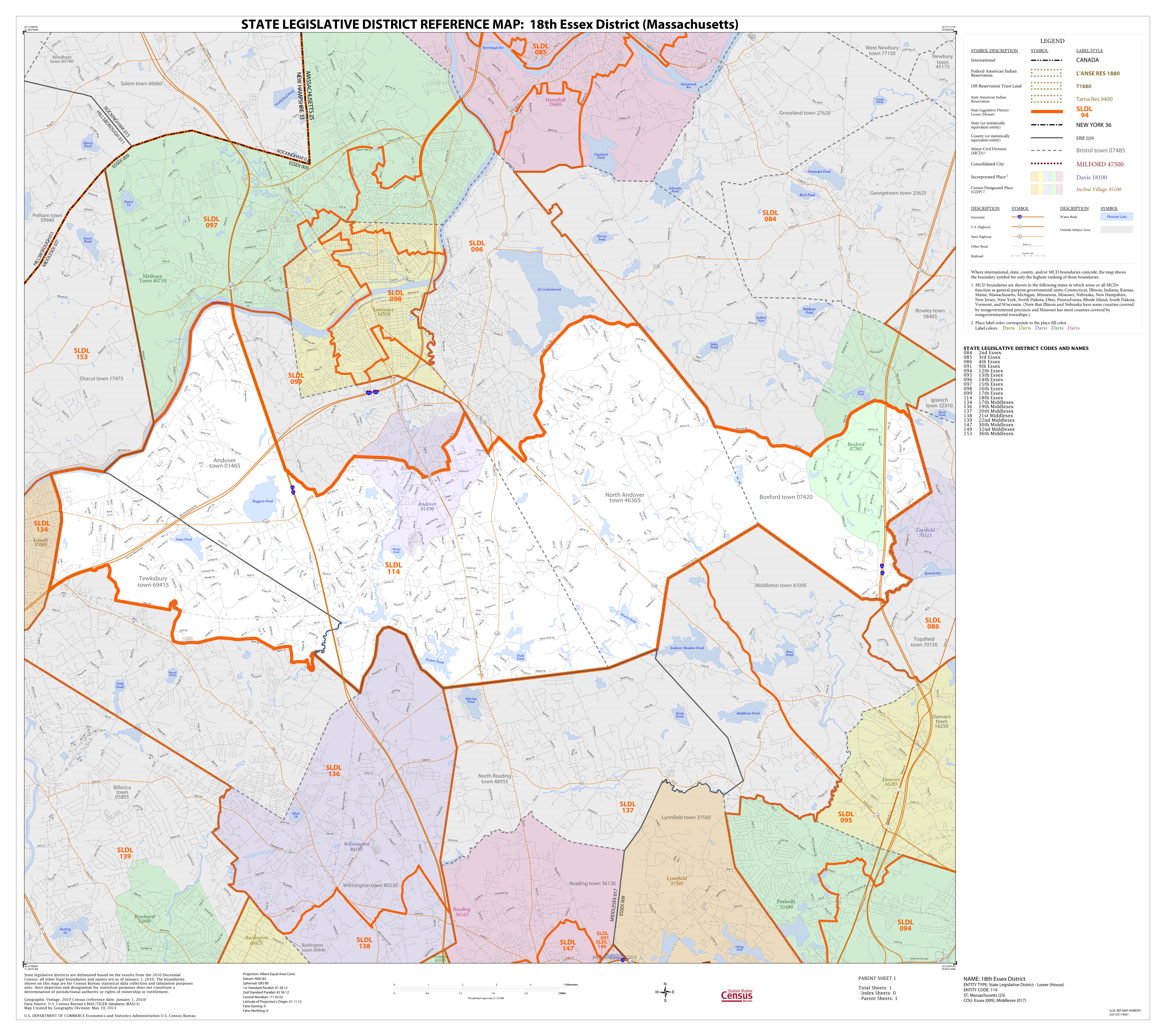
Map of Massachusetts House of Representatives' 18th Essex district, based on the 2010 United States census

Massachusetts House of Representatives' 18th Essex district in the United States is one of 160 legislative districts included in the lower house of the Massachusetts General Court. It covers parts of Essex County and Middlesex County.

Democrat Tram Nguyen of Andover had represented the district since 2019. She ran for reelection in the 2020 Massachusetts general election.

== Towns represented ==
The district includes the following localities:

- part of Andover
- part of Boxford
- part of North Andover
- part of Tewksbury

The current district geographic boundary overlaps with those of the Massachusetts Senate's 1st Essex and Middlesex and 2nd Essex and Middlesex districts.

=== Former locales ===
The district previously covered:

- part of Lynn, circa 1872
- part of Methuen, circa 1974
- Swampscott, circa 1872

== Representatives ==
- Caleb Cushing, circa 1858-1859
- Elihu B. Hayes, circa 1888
- James P. Martin, circa 1888
- George J. Bates, circa 1920
- Nicholas J. Buglione, circa 1975
- Barbara L'Italien, January 2003 – January 2011
- James J. Lyons Jr., January 2011 – January 2019
- Tram Nguyen, 2019-current

== See also ==
- List of Massachusetts House of Representatives elections
- Other Essex County districts of the Massachusetts House of Representatives: 1st, 2nd, 3rd, 4th, 5th, 6th, 7th, 8th, 9th, 10th, 11th, 12th, 13th, 14th, 15th, 16th, 17th
- Essex County districts of the Massachusett Senate: 1st, 2nd, 3rd; 1st Essex and Middlesex; 2nd Essex and Middlesex
- List of Massachusetts General Courts
- List of former districts of the Massachusetts House of Representatives

== Images ==
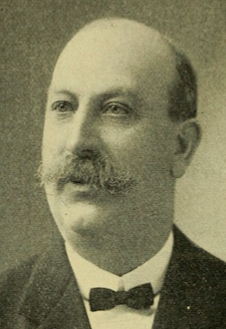
Robert Pollock

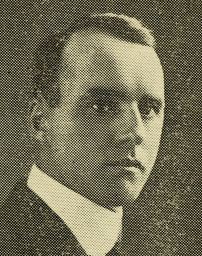
George Joseph Bates

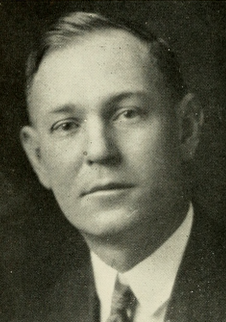
Herbert Urquhart

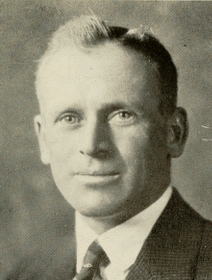
Joseph Rolfe

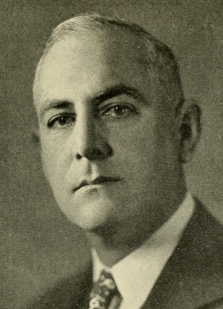
Harland Burke

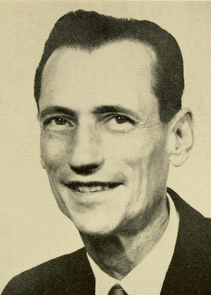
A. Edward Talbot

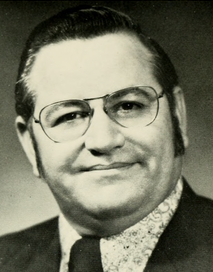
Nicholas Buglione

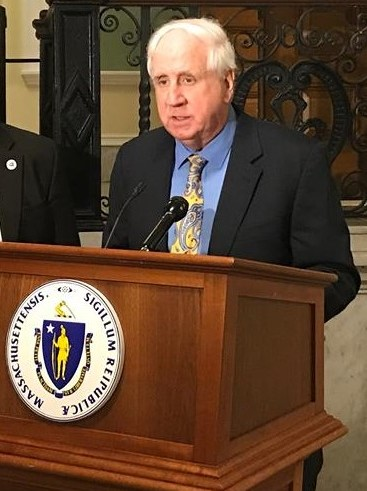
Jim Lyons

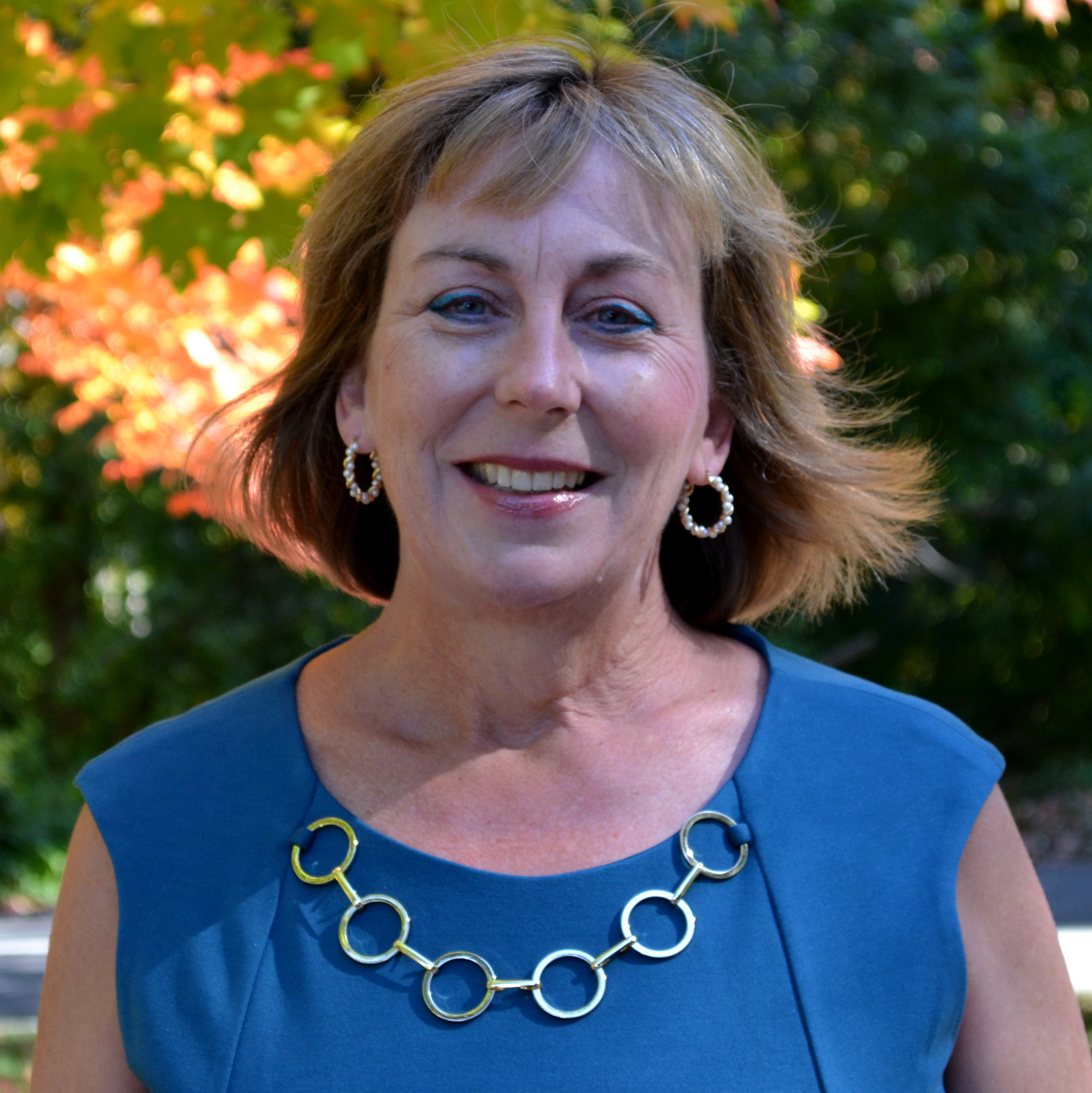
Barbara L'Italien

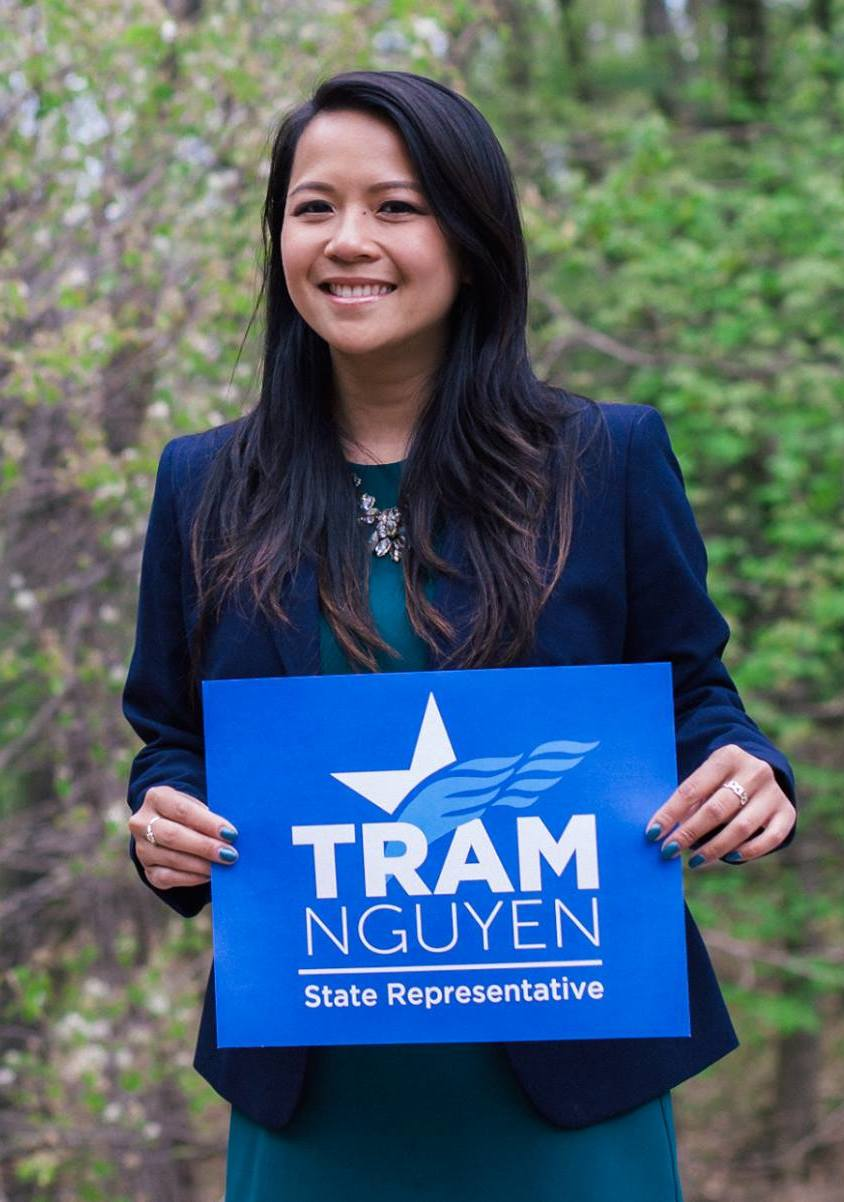
Tram Nguyen
