= James J. Lyons Jr. =

American politician

Jim Lyons
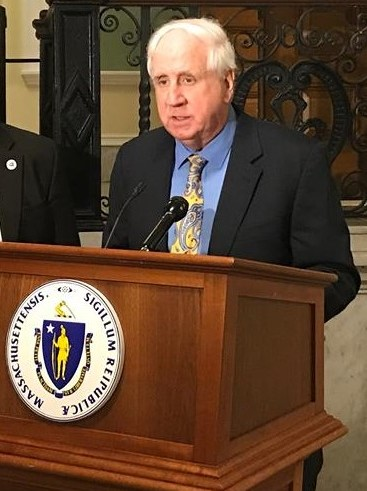

Chair of the Massachusetts Republican Party
- In office January 17, 2019 – January 31, 2023
- Preceded by: Kirsten Hughes
- Succeeded by: Amy Carnevale

Member of the Massachusetts House of Representatives from the 18th Essex district
- In office January 5, 2011 – January 2, 2019
- Preceded by: Barbara L'Italien
- Succeeded by: Tram Nguyen

Personal details
- Born: Arlington, Massachusetts, U.S.
- Party: Democratic (1970s-1980s); Republican
- Spouse: Bernadette Tortelli
- Children: 2
- Education: Brandeis University (BA)

James J. Lyons Jr. is an American politician who served in the Massachusetts House of Representatives from the 18th Essex district from 2011 to 2019, and as chair of the Massachusetts Republican Party from 2019 to 2023.

== Early life ==
James J. Lyons Jr. was born in Arlington, Massachusetts. He graduated from Arlington Catholic High School in 1971, and Brandeis University with a bachelor's degree in political science in 1975. He married Bernadette Tortelli, with whom he had two children.

== Career ==
=== Early politics ===
Lyons served as a town meeting member in Arlington, Massachusetts. He was one of three people elected to the Arlington School Committee in the 1977 election.

In 1978, Lyons ran against incumbent state senator Samuel Rotondi in the Democratic primary for the 4th Middlesex district, but was defeated. He ran again while Rotondi ran for lieutenant governor in the 1982 election. Lyons lost the Democratic primary to Dick Kraus despite a recount.

=== State representative ===
On November 2, 2010, Lyons upset incumbent representative Barbara L'Italien. He was sworn in on January 5, 2011. Lyons's legislative priorities often focused on anti-abortion issues, fighting the Opioid epidemic, and advocating for local aid. He derailed a bill that would have added a gender-neutral option to Massachusetts driver's licenses, forced the state to reveal that it gave out $1.8 billion in public assistance to undocumented immigrants, and led an unsuccessful effort in the state legislature to remove Salem Superior Court Judge Timothy Feeley from the bench. Lyons was defeated by Democratic nominee Tram Nguyen in the 2018 election.

Lyons supported Ted Cruz during the 2016 Republican presidential primary and served as Cruz's Massachusetts campaign chair. Vincent DeVito, Donald Trump's Massachusetts campaign chair, claimed that Lyons told Massachusetts delegates to ignore paperwork as an attempt to stop Trump's nomination.

During Lyons' tenure in the state house he served on the Joint Committee on Housing and was the ranking Republican member of the Joint Committee on Community Development and Small Business and Joint Committee on State Administration and Regulatory Oversight. In May 2014, Lyons and Marc Lombardo challenged Bradley Jones Jr.'s position as Minority Leader, but 21 of the 29 member Republican caucus supported Jones. Lyons and Lombardo abstained from the vote. None of the legislation he authored was passed by the legislature.

=== State party chairman ===
Kirsten Hughes, chair of the Massachusetts Republican Party, declined to seek another term. Lyons announced his intention to run for chair on December 19, 2018, after Geoff Diehl, a political ally, declined to seek the position. Diehl's endorsement of Brent Andersen, the party's treasurer, for the position resulted in criticism from more conservative members, including Lyons. Lyons defeated Andersen, who was supported by Governor Charlie Baker, by a vote of 47 to 30 on January 17, 2019. He was reelected as chair on January 3, 2021, by a vote of 39 to 36 against Shawn Dooley. Lyons lost reelection as the party's chair to Amy Carnevale by a vote of 37 to 34 on January 30, 2023.

During Lyons' tenure the party lost nine seats in the state legislature and saw it reach its lowest share of registered voters since 1948. Karen Spilka mockingly proposed Jim Lyons Day for "his unparalleled contribution, helping us drive all the Republicans out of the State House".

==== Discrimination ====
In 2021, over two dozen Asian-American Republicans stated that Lyons was selectively enforcing procedural rules to prevent them from participating in the election of two state party committee members in order for his candidates to win. Donnie Palmer, a candidate in the 2021 Boston City Council election, was endorsed by Lyons and the Massachusetts Republican Party spent $3,697 on ads for him. State committee member Jaclyn Corriveau, the only Asian-American and non-white member, told Lyons about anti-Asian statements made by Palmer, but was ignored. Palmer later harassed Corriveau. Baker called for Lyons to resign as chair, but he refused and stated that Baker was "abandoning the principles of the Republican Party".

In June 2021, Lyons defended anti-gay remarks made by Deborah Martell, a member of the Massachusetts Republican State Committee, who said she was "sickened" to learn that a gay Republican congressional candidate had adopted children with his husband. Former party chairs Darrell Crate, Brian Cresta, Kerry Healey, Jean Inman, Jeanne Kangas, Jennifer Nassour, and Peter G. Torkildsen signed a letter calling for his resignation. Every member of the Republican caucus in the state house, except for Lombardo, called for him to have Martell resign or resign himself. 16 donors threatened to stop supporting the party if Lyons remained as chair and offered to raise $1 million if he was removed. In response, Lyons criticized them as a "woke mob" with a "cancel culture mentality." As the controversy continued to embroil Lyons, national Republicans distanced themselves from the MassGOP, with Congressman Dan Crenshaw and Congresswoman Cynthia Lummis canceling several previously planned fundraisers for the state party. By September, former White House Press Secretary Ari Fleischer had backed out of a heavily promoted party fundraiser "due to a conflict" with no new date having been announced.

==== Intraparty disputes ====
A conservative, Lyons did not have the support of the moderate state party establishment led by Baker, who once endorsed him for state representative. Lyons also did not have the support of DeVito, who had endorsed Andersen in a public letter sent to supporters of Trump on May 31, 2016. Lyons was in attendance of Trump's announcement of his 2024 presidential campaign.

Lyons unsuccessfully attempted to remove Baker and other elected officials' voting power in the party. Lyons spent $1,800, $800 of which were party funds, to investigate Republican committee members, Lindsay Valanzola and Matthew Sisk, who opposed him.

==== Finances ====
Baker and Lyons had a dispute over the party's donor list held by Salesforce in 2019, but Lyons regained access after threatening a lawsuit against Salesforce. The Massachusetts Victory Committee, which raised $11 million since its foundation in 2013, was disbanded in 2019, and its finance chairman, John Cook, stated that the state party was on path for its "worst year of fund-raising since 2009". In 2020, Lyons requested the Internal Revenue Service, FBI, Federal Election Commission, Office of Campaign and Political Finance, and U.S. District Attorney Andrew Lelling to investigate Cook misusing $1 million in party funds. Andersen stated that Lyons' claims were "motivated solely" by "personal political interest".

Lyons sued Pat Crowley, the party's treasurer, in 2022 after Crowley froze the party's bank account as a budget was not passed by a quorum, but Carnevale dropped the lawsuit after taking office. Lyons and twenty-one members of the state committee members filed a revive the lawsuit against Crowley.

Ryan Fattman, Stephanie Fattman, and Lyons were investigated by the Office of Campaign and Political Finance in 2021. The OCPF reported that they did violate campaign finance laws. Crowley accused Lyons of having communicated with Antoine Nader, chair of the Mass Freedom Independent Expenditure PAC, during the 2022 gubernatorial election in violating of state laws prohibiting the coordination of independent expenditure PACs with candidates or political parties. Emails between Lyons and Nader were obtained by The Boston Globe.

== Political positions ==
Lyons is anti-abortion and unsuccessful sought an abortion referendum in the 2010s. He opposes transgender rights and petitioned for a referendum to repeal transgender rights legislation. He opposed the Massachusetts Ranked-Choice Voting Initiative.

Lyons and Diehl proposed legislation to require people seeking welfare benefits to present a Social Security number or green card. He supported an eight-year term limit for speaker. He opposed ending Massachusetts's flat-tax on income.

Lyons supported Trump's false claims about fraud in the 2020 presidential election. He wanted to hold a referendum on requiring voter identification. He filed a lawsuit against Massachusetts's universal no-fault mail-in voting, but the Massachusetts Supreme Judicial Court ruled against him.

In 2019, Lyons was given a 97% rating by the NRA Political Victory Fund, with an A− rating and endorsement in 2014.

== Works cited ==
- 116th Annual Report of the Town Officers of the Town of Arlington, Massachusetts and The Town Record for the Year Ending December 31, 1972. Arlington, Massachusetts. 1972.

Massachusetts House of Representatives
Preceded by Barbara L'Italien	Member of the Massachusetts House of Representatives from the 18th Essex district 2011–2019	Succeeded by Tram Nguyen
Party political offices
Preceded by Kirsten Hughes	Chair of the Massachusetts Republican Party; 2019–2023	Succeeded by Amy Carnevale
