= Walter J. Boverini =

American politician (1925–2008)

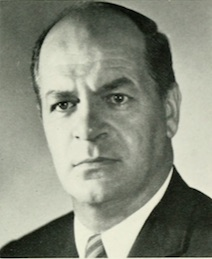

Member of the Massachusetts Senate from the 1st Essex District
- In office 1973–1994
- Preceded by: James J. Carrigan
- Succeeded by: Edward J. Clancy, Jr.

Personal details
- Born: June 5, 1925 Lynn, Massachusetts
- Died: November 29, 2008 (aged 83) Danvers, Massachusetts
- Party: Democratic
- Education: Boston College
- Occupation: Educator; Politician

Walter J. Boverini (June 5, 1925 – November 29, 2008) was an American politician who served as the majority leader of the Massachusetts Senate from 1985 to 1994.

== Early life ==
Boverini was born on June 5, 1925, in Lynn, Massachusetts, to Luisa and Attilio Boverini. He graduated from Lynn Classical High School in 1941. After high school, he was drafted into the United States Army and served 8th Air Corps during World War II. During the war Boverini flew 35 combat missions over Europe. He was awarded the Air Medal with four oak leaf clusters and the Distinguished Flying Cross.

After the war, Boverini entered Boston College. He was a member of the Boston College Eagles football team. After graduating, Boverini began an eighteen-year career as an educator. He worked as a teacher, coach, vice principal, and mentor at St. Mary's High School, Lynn Classical High School, English High School, and Lynn Vocational and Technical Institute.

== Political career ==
In 1970, Boverini was elected to the Massachusetts House of Representatives, representing the 9th Essex District. In 1972, he ran for State Senate. He defeated incumbent James J. Carrigan by under 500 votes.

In 1979 Boverini was appointed majority whip. Six years later he was appointed majority whip, a position he would hold until his retirement. In these positions, Boverini worked closely with Senate President William M. Bulger. Bulger credited his long tenure as Senate President to Boverini's loyalty and good judgment. Boverini also served as Chairman of the Joint Committee on Education for six years. In this role, he helped create the University of Massachusetts system and secured funding to create North Shore Community College's Lynn campus.

== Personal life ==
Boverini was married to Christine M. (Kirvan) Boverini for forty years. They had two daughters.

Boverini was close friends with Art Donovan for over five decades. The two were roommates and teammates at Boston College. Donovan was the best man at Boverini's wedding.

== Death ==
Boverini died on November 29, 2008, in Danvers, Massachusetts.
