= Barbara L'Italien =

American politician (born 1961)

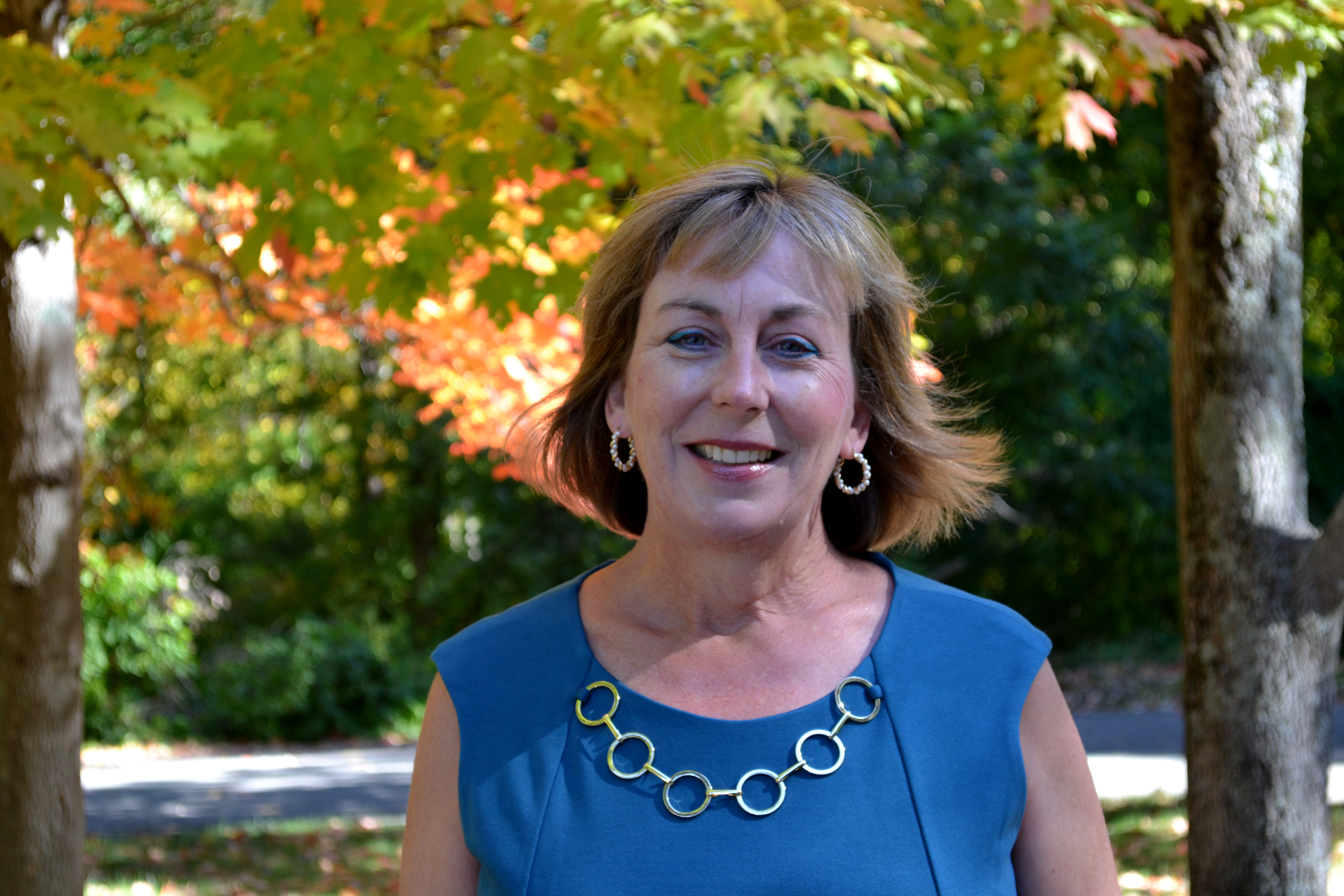

Member of the Massachusetts Senate from the 2nd Essex and Middlesex district
- In office January 7, 2015 – January 2019
- Preceded by: Barry Finegold
- Succeeded by: Barry Finegold

Member of the Massachusetts House of Representatives from the 18th Essex district
- In office January 2003 – January 2011
- Preceded by: Constituency established
- Succeeded by: James J. Lyons Jr.

Personal details
- Born: January 3, 1961 (age 65) Passaic, New Jersey, U.S.
- Party: Democratic
- Spouse: Kevin Hall
- Education: Merrimack College (BA)
- Website: Senate website

Barbara A. L'Italien (born January 3, 1961) is an American politician from the state of Massachusetts, serving from January 2015 to 2019 as the State Senator from the 2nd Essex and Middlesex District. She was previously the director of government affairs for the Treasurer and Receiver-General of Massachusetts, Steve Grossman. From 2003 to January 2011 she was a member of the Massachusetts House of Representatives representing the 18th Essex District.

In 2017, she announced her candidacy for Congress, representing Massachusetts's 3rd congressional district, held by Niki Tsongas, who announced August 9, 2017 that she would not be seeking another term in Congress in 2018. She lost the primary to Lori Trahan, who then won the general election.

== Early life and career ==
L'Italien was born in Passaic, New Jersey, and later graduated from Andover High School in 1978. She attended Merrimack College and graduated with a Bachelor of Arts degree in political science in 1984.

Prior to her election to the House of Representatives, L'Italien worked for Elder Services of Merrimack Valley as a case manager and with the Greater Lawrence Psychological Center working the elder abuse hotline for intakes and referrals. She also worked with West Suburban Elder Services with the title of Supervisor of Case Management and Elder Abuse.

== State government ==
=== Massachusetts House of Representatives ===
L'Italien is the first State Representative to represent the 18th Essex district, which was created by redistricting following the 2000 census. She held office from 2003 to 2011.

In the district's first campaign in 2002, L'Italien defeated Republican Kathleen Sachs and unenrolled candidate Alfred DePietro, winning by less than 1,000 votes (47–41% over Sachs). In 2004, she defended the seat against Republican Maria Marasco, winning with 58% of the vote. In 2006 and 2008, Republican Lawrence Brennan ran against L'Italien, but she defeated him with 56% of the vote in 2006 and 55% in 2008. In 2010 she was defeated for re-election by Andover Republican Jim Lyons, who won with 53% of the vote.

Representative L'Italien was the author of the landmark legislation on Autism insurance coverage, House Bill 4935 (formerly H. 3809), which requires insurance companies to provide coverage of evidence-based, medically necessary autism therapies, such as applied behavior analysis.

=== Treasury department ===
After her House term ended in January 2011, she became director of government affairs for the newly elected Treasurer and Receiver-General of Massachusetts, Steve Grossman until 2012.

=== Massachusetts Senate ===
L'Italien was elected to the Massachusetts Senate in November 2014 to succeed Barry Finegold in the 2nd Essex and Middlesex seat. She defeated Andover Republican Alex Vispoli in the general election (winning 50% of the vote). She took office January 7, 2015. In the 2016 election, she defeated Lawrence Republican Susan LaPlante winning in all four towns with over 63% of the vote. She served as the Chair of the Joint Committee on Consumer Protection and Professional Licensure and the Joint Committee on Elder Affairs, as well as the Vice Chair of the Senate Committee on Bills in the Third Reading.

== Appearance on Fox and Friends First ==
On July 23, 2018, L'Italien appeared on Fox & Friends First and criticized the Trump administration family separation policy. Fox had intended to book Ann Kirkpatrick, a Democrat running for Congress in Arizona's 2nd congressional district and booked L'Italien by mistake.

== Related links ==
- Official website (Massachusetts legislature)
