= Katherine A. Foley =

American politician

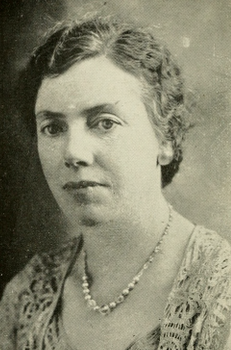

Member of the Massachusetts House of Representatives from the 3rd Essex district
- In office 1935–1938
- Preceded by: Louis J. Scanlon
- Succeeded by: Thomas A. Barry

Personal details
- Born: Katherine Alena Carr; May 10, 1889 Ireland
- Died: February 20, 1981 (aged 91) Andover, Massachusetts
- Party: Democratic

Katherine Alena (née Carr) Foley (May 10, 1889 – February 20, 1981) was an Irish-American politician who represented the 3rd Essex district in the Massachusetts House of Representatives from 1935–1938. She was the first woman to receive a major party's nomination for statewide office in Massachusetts.

== Personal life ==
Born in Ireland, she emigrated to Lawrence, Massachusetts as a child. She attended the Lawrence Public Schools and then Cannon's Commercial College. Her husband, Mark Foley, died just before she took her seat in the Massachusetts House. They had three daughters together.

Foley was a member of the St. Clare League of Catholic Women. She died February 20, 1981. Her funeral was held at St. Augustne's Church in Andover, Massachusetts and she was buried at the Immaculate Conception Cemetery. in Lawrence.

== Career ==
Foley was introduced to politics by her brother Peter Carr, who was a Lawrence alderman, state representative, and state boxing commissioner. During her husband's illness, Foley decided to enter politics as a way to bring in money while her husband was out of work. She ran for, and lost, a seat in the Massachusetts House in 1932, but was victorious in 1934 and reelected in 1936.

In 1938, she sponsored a bill which eliminated breach of promise or "heart balm" suits. That same year she became the first foreign-born woman to preside over a session of the Massachusetts House of Representatives. In 1938 and 1940 she was the Democratic nominee for Massachusetts Secretary of the Commonwealth, becoming the first woman to ever win a major party's nomination for statewide office. She then served 12 years as director of the Massachusetts Division of Minimum Wages.

Governor Paul Dever then appointed Foley as the assistant director of labor and industry in 1950. Foley retired in 1953.

== See also ==
- 1935-1936 Massachusetts legislature
- 1937-1938 Massachusetts legislature
