= Tram Nguyen =

Massachusetts politician (born 1986)

Member of the Massachusetts House of Representatives from the 18th Essex district
- Incumbent
- Assumed office January 2, 2019
- Preceded by: Jim Lyons

Personal details
- Born: Tram Thi Ngoc Nguyen; June 22, 1986 (age 40) Vietnam
- Party: Democratic
- Education: Tufts University (BA); Northeastern University (JD); Harvard University (MPA)

Tram Thi Ngoc Nguyen (Note: Pronounced /trɑːm wɪn/) (Vietnamese: Nguyễn Thị Ngọc Trâm; born June 22, 1986) is an American politician serving as a member of the Massachusetts House of Representatives from the 18th Essex District. She represents the towns of Andover, Boxford, North Andover, and Tewksbury. She currently resides in Andover with her husband Nathanael Powers and two dogs.

Nguyen is currently serving as the Chair of the House Committee on Climate Action and Sustainability (the first Asian American woman chair in the MA House of Representatives) and member of the Joint Committee on Financial Services. She has previously served as Vice Chair of the House Committee on Steering, Policy, and Scheduling and the Joint Committee on Labor and Workforce Development.

Prior to being elected as the first Vietnamese American woman in the Massachusetts Legislature, Nguyen was an attorney at Greater Boston Legal Services providing support for survivors of domestic violence, immigrants, seniors, veterans, people with disabilities, low-wage workers, and others from vulnerable communities. Nguyen is the highest ranking Asian American woman in the Massachusetts legislature.

In October 2025, Nguyen announced her candidacy in the 2026 election for the open seat in Massachusetts's 6th congressional district following U.S. Representative Seth Moulton’s decision to run for the U.S. Senate against incumbent Senator Ed Markey. She came in second in the September 1, 2026 primary.

== Early life and education ==
Nguyen was born in Vietnam and immigrated to the United States with her family as political refugees when she was 5 years old. She was raised in the Merrimack Valley — first living in public housing in Lawrence and then moving to Methuen. Nguyen graduated from Methuen High School and enrolled at Tufts University as a first-generation college student. She is the first person in her family to graduate from college and graduate school.

Nguyen received a degree in Sociology and American Studies from Tufts University and then her Juris Doctor from Northeastern University.

In 2022, Nguyen was named a Rappaport Urban Scholar. The Rappaport Urban Scholars Program provides full-tuition scholarships to elected and appointed officials to attend the Harvard Kennedy School’s Mid-Career Master in Public Administration (MC/MPA) program. Nguyen graduated from the Harvard Kennedy School MC/MPA program in 2024.

== Career ==
=== Legal career ===
Nguyen began her legal career as a fellow through Equal Justice Works and worked at Greater Boston Legal Services (GBLS), where she focused on providing legal representation to survivors of domestic violence in family and immigration law. Nguyen later became a staff attorney at GBLS and then the coordinator for the Civil Legal Aid for Victims of Crime Project, where she represented and advocated for seniors, veterans, people with disabilities, and others from vulnerable communities who were victims of crimes. She also led the Nail Salon Initiative to help low-wage workers fight wage theft.

=== State representative ===
Tram Nguyen ran for State Representative of the 18th Essex District (parts of Andover, Boxford, North Andover, and Tewksbury) in Massachusetts. Nguyen ran against the incumbent Republican Rep. James J. Lyons Jr., who had been in office for 8 years prior to Nguyen's victory. Nguyen won with a 54% majority victory. Nguyen is the first Vietnamese American woman to be elected to office in Massachusetts.

During her campaign, Nguyen ran on a number of issues including better funding for public education, preserving the environment, prioritizing equality and inclusion, gun violence prevention, making health care more affordable and accessible, addressing the opioid epidemic as a public health crisis, supporting seniors and veterans, investing in transportation, fighting for women's health, and improving the lives of working families.

=== Awards and distinctions ===
Her honors during her legal career include the Lawrence Bar Association Merit Award, Vietnamese American Bar Association Public Service Award, Reginald Heber Smith Award for Legal Advocacy, and the UAW Social Justice Award.

As a legislator, she has received several distinctions, including:

- Women's Empowerment Award (2019)
- Asian American Women's Political Initiative Legislator of the Year (2019)
- Young Democrats of Massachusetts Elected Official of the Year (2020)
- Council of State Governments “20 Under 40” Award (2020)
- NewDEAL Leader (2021)
- Gabby Giffords Rising Star Award Nominee (EMILY's List, 2021)
- Caring Bear Award (The Caring Force of the Providers’ Council, 2021)
- Massachusetts Office for Victim Assistance Legislator of the Year (2022)
- YWCA Tribute to Women Award (2022)
- Healing Abuse Working for Change (HAWC) Dale Orlando Award (2023)
- Women's Bar Association Emerging Women Leaders in the Law Award (2023)
- The Holly Taylor Sargent Award for Women's Advancement (2024)
- Emerge Massachusetts Woman of the Year (2024)
- Asian American Women's Political Initiative Gamechanger Award (2024)
- Women's Bar Association Public Official of the Year Award (2025)
- Green Mentors Global Green Leadership Award (2025)
- National Conference of Vietnamese American Attorneys Trailblazer Award (2026)
- The Sue Tucker Community Leadership Award (2026)

=== 2026 congressional campaign ===
Nguyen came in second in the 2026 congressional primary for Massachusetts' 6th congressional district on September 1, 2026 with 29.4% of the primary vote. Dan Koh won the primary with a plurality of 40.9%. John Beccia was third at 12.2%.
