= Kirsten Hughes (politician) =

American politician, singer, and attorney

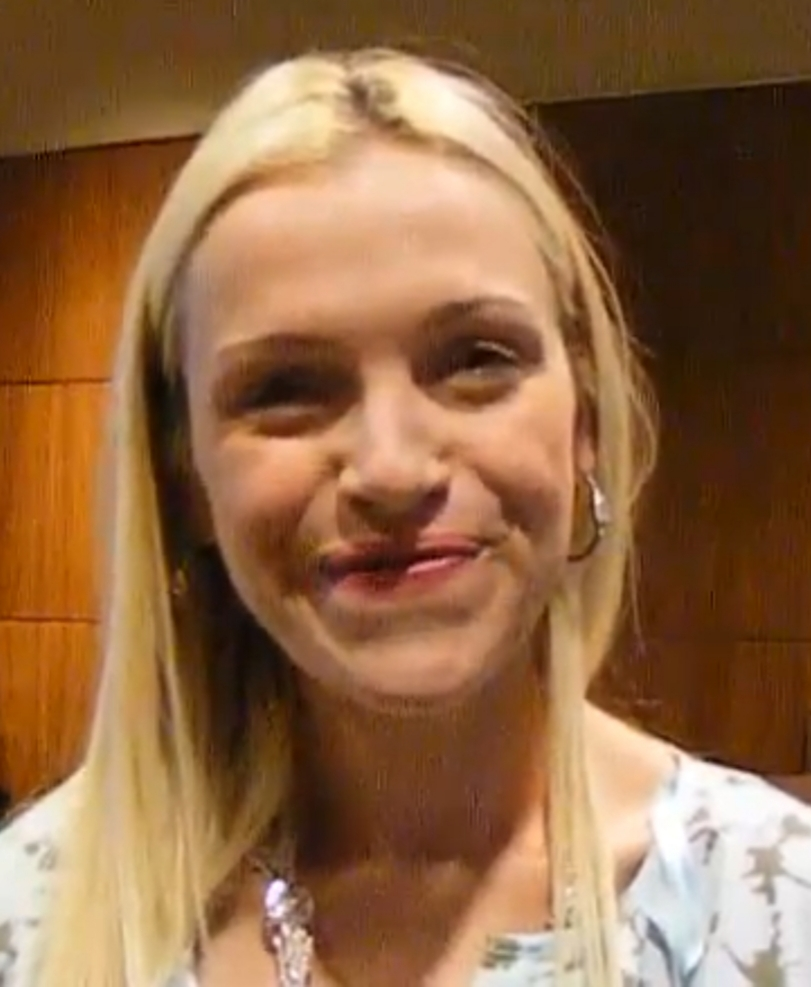

Chair of the Massachusetts Republican Party
- In office January 10, 2013 – January 17, 2019
- Preceded by: Robert Maginn
- Succeeded by: Jim Lyons

Member of the Quincy City Council from the 5th ward
- In office January 3, 2012 – January 6, 2020
- Preceded by: Douglas Gutro
- Succeeded by: Charles J. Phelan, Jr.

Personal details
- Born: Quincy, Massachusetts, U.S.
- Party: Republican
- Education: New York University (BFA); New England School of Law (JD)

Kirsten L. Hughes is an American political figure, singer, and attorney who is the clerk magistrate of South Boston Municipal Court. She was the Chair of the Massachusetts Republican Party from 2013 to 2019 and a member of the Quincy, Massachusetts City Council from 2012 to 2020.

== Early life ==
Hughes was born and raised in Quincy. She began her political involvement at the age of twelve as a volunteer for William Weld's gubernatorial campaign. She graduated from Notre Dame Academy in 1995.

== Singing ==
Hughes earned a degree in theater arts from New York University. For over eighteen years, she worked as a singing waitress at West Quincy's Common Market Café. She also sang professionally in New York City, participated in community musicals, performed around Boston with a cover band called Velvet Krush, and played Ariel for a year in the Walt Disney World show Voyage of the Little Mermaid.

== Legal career ==
Hughes earned a J.D. degree from New England School of Law. She was admitted to the Massachusetts Bar in 2008 and worked for the Suffolk County District Attorney's office.

== Politics ==
=== Early work ===
Hughes was a political field director for the Massachusetts Republican Party and ran the party's state convention in 2010. She then served as deputy finance director for Scott Brown's 2012 Senate campaign. In this role she helped Brown raise $42 million.

=== Quincy City Council ===
In 2011, Hughes was elected to the Quincy City Council in Ward 5. She defeated Neil McCole by 1,804 votes to 1,288. From 2016 to 2018 she was council president.

=== Massachusetts Republican Party Chair ===
On December 6, 2012, Hughes declared her candidacy for Chair of the Massachusetts Republican Party. She faced Richard Green, a state committeeman, businessman, and founder of the Massachusetts Fiscal Alliance. Hughes was seen as the establishment candidate while Green was seen as anti-establishment.

On January 31, 2013, Hughes was elected chair by a vote of 41 to 39. She was elected on the second ballot, as the result of the first ballot was contested and then set aside. She was unopposed in 2015 and defeated conservative activist Steve Aylward 46 to 30 in 2017. She did not run for reelection in 2019 and was succeeded by James J. Lyons Jr.

=== Clerk magistrate ===
After her tenure as chairman ended, Hughes served as general counsel and special sheriff in the office of Norfolk County Sheriff Jerry McDermott. In November 2019 she was appointed clerk magistrate of Stoughton District Court by Governor Charlie Baker. In 2022, she was nominated for the same position in the South Boston Municipal Court.

== Personal life ==
Hughes married Philip Doherty, a software engineer, in 2010. The couple had a son in 2012.

Party political offices
Preceded by Robert Maginn	Chair of the Massachusetts Republican Party; 2013–2019	Succeeded by Jim Lyons
