= Carl Ohlson =

American politician

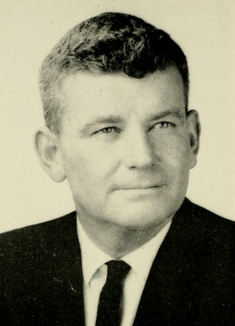
Carl R. Ohlson

Carl R. Ohlson is an American politician.

He won election to the Massachusetts House of Representatives from the 10th Plymouth district in 1968, 1970 and 1972, then lost to Karen Swanson in the 14th Plymouth district during the 1974 election cycle.
