= Thomas M. McGee =

American politician (born 1955)

Tom McGee
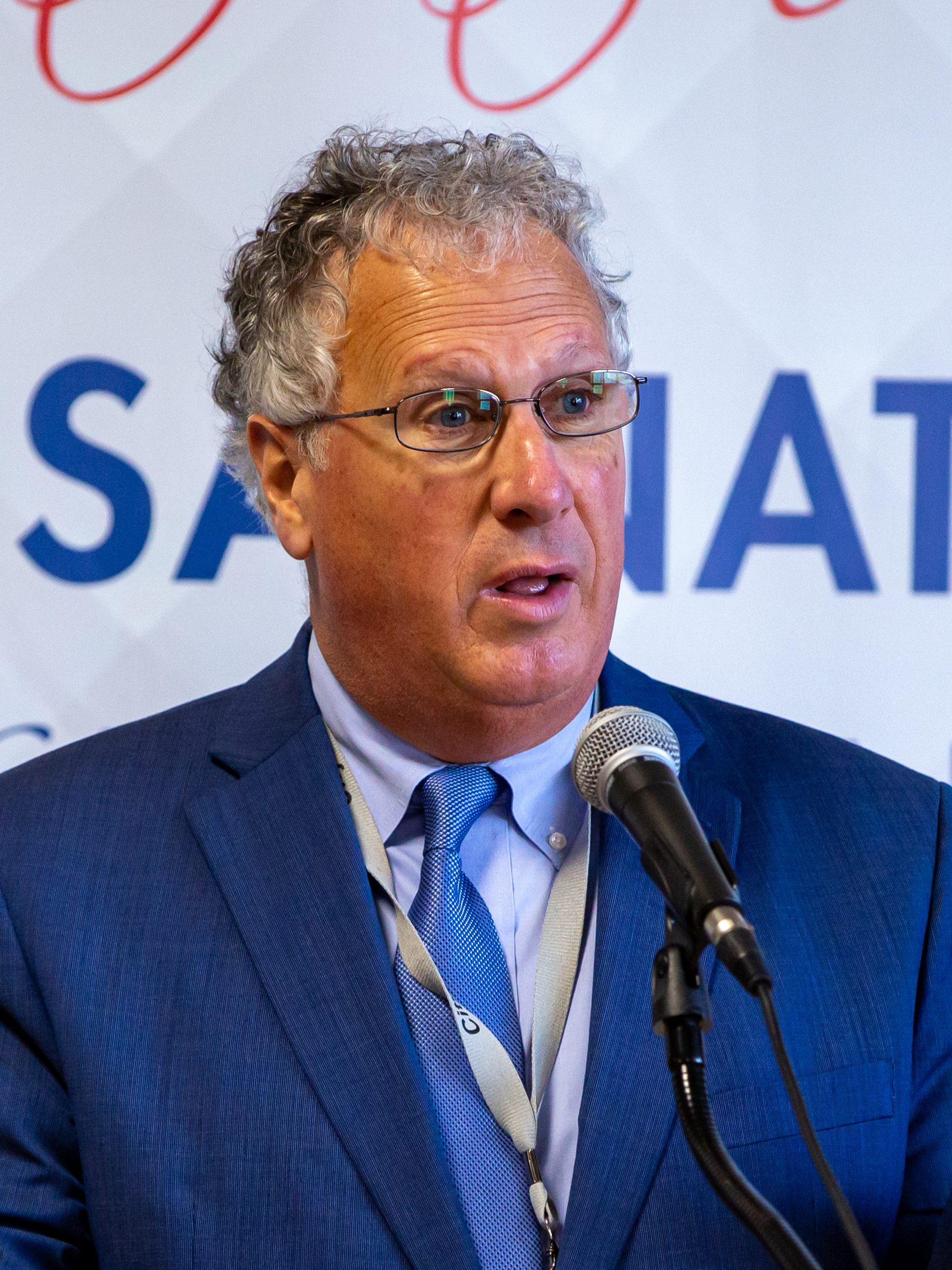
- McGee in 2019

Chair of the Massachusetts Bay Transportation Authority Board of Directors
- Incumbent
- Assumed office November 1, 2024
- Preceded by: Thomas P. Glynn

57th Mayor of Lynn
- In office January 3, 2018 – January 5, 2022
- Preceded by: Judith Flanagan Kennedy
- Succeeded by: Jared C. Nicholson

Chair of the Massachusetts Democratic Party
- In office October 17, 2013 – November 14, 2016
- Preceded by: John E. Walsh
- Succeeded by: Gus Bickford

Member of the Massachusetts Senate from the 3rd Essex district
- In office 2002–2018
- Preceded by: Edward J. Clancy Jr.
- Succeeded by: Brendan Crighton

Member of the Massachusetts House of Representatives from the 11th Essex district
- In office 1995–2002
- Preceded by: Edward J. Clancy Jr.
- Succeeded by: Steven Walsh

Personal details
- Born: December 15, 1955 (age 70) Lynn, Massachusetts, U.S.
- Party: Democratic
- Relatives: Thomas W. McGee (Father)
- Education: University of Massachusetts, Lowell (BA); New England School of Law (JD)

Thomas M. McGee (born December 15, 1955) is a former mayor of Lynn, Massachusetts, and current chair of the Massachusetts Bay Transportation Authority board of directors. Previously, he served as a Massachusetts state senator for the Third Essex district. He is a Democrat.

== Early life and education ==
McGee was born on December 15, 1955, in Lynn, Massachusetts as the son of Thomas W. McGee, former speaker of the Massachusetts House of Representatives (1975–1984).

== Career ==
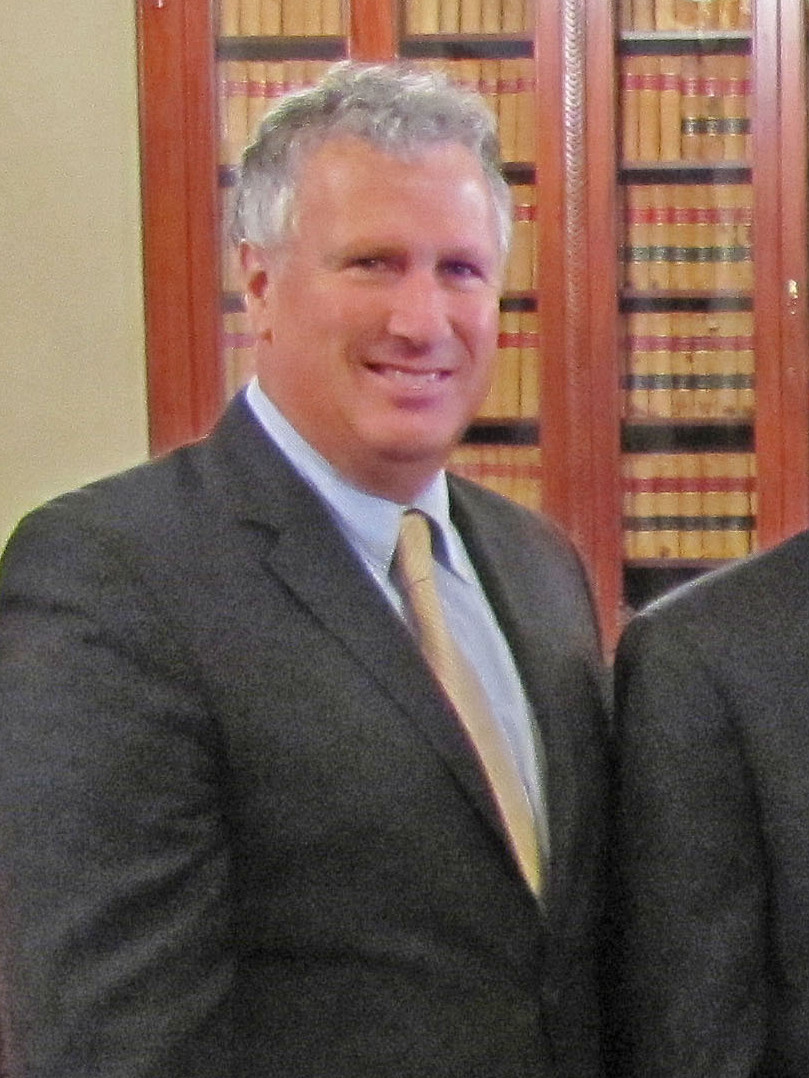
McGee in 2013

McGee was chairman of the Senate Labor and Workforce Development Committee, the Joint Public Service Committee, and the Joint Children's Caucus. Prior to serving in the Senate, he was an attorney who served as a state representative from 1995 to 2002. McGee was elected Chairman of the Massachusetts Democratic Party on October 17, 2013.

In 2017, he was elected mayor of Lynn defeating incumbent mayor Judith Flanagan Kennedy in a landslide. The Mayor also serves as the Chairperson for the Lynn School Committee for Lynn Public Schools.

He was appointed by the governor to the Board of Directors of the Massachusetts Department of Transportation and to the Massachusetts Bay Transportation Authority (MBTA) board in April, 2024. In November, 2024, McGee replaced Thomas P. Glynn as chair of the MBTA board upon Glynn's departure.

== Personal life ==
McGee is married and lives in Lynn with his wife, Maria, and their children, Thomas and Katherine.

Party political offices
| Preceded by John E. Walsh | Chair of the Massachusetts Democratic Party; 2013–2016 | Succeeded by Gus Bickford |
