= Massachusetts House of Representatives' 11th Essex district =

American legislative district

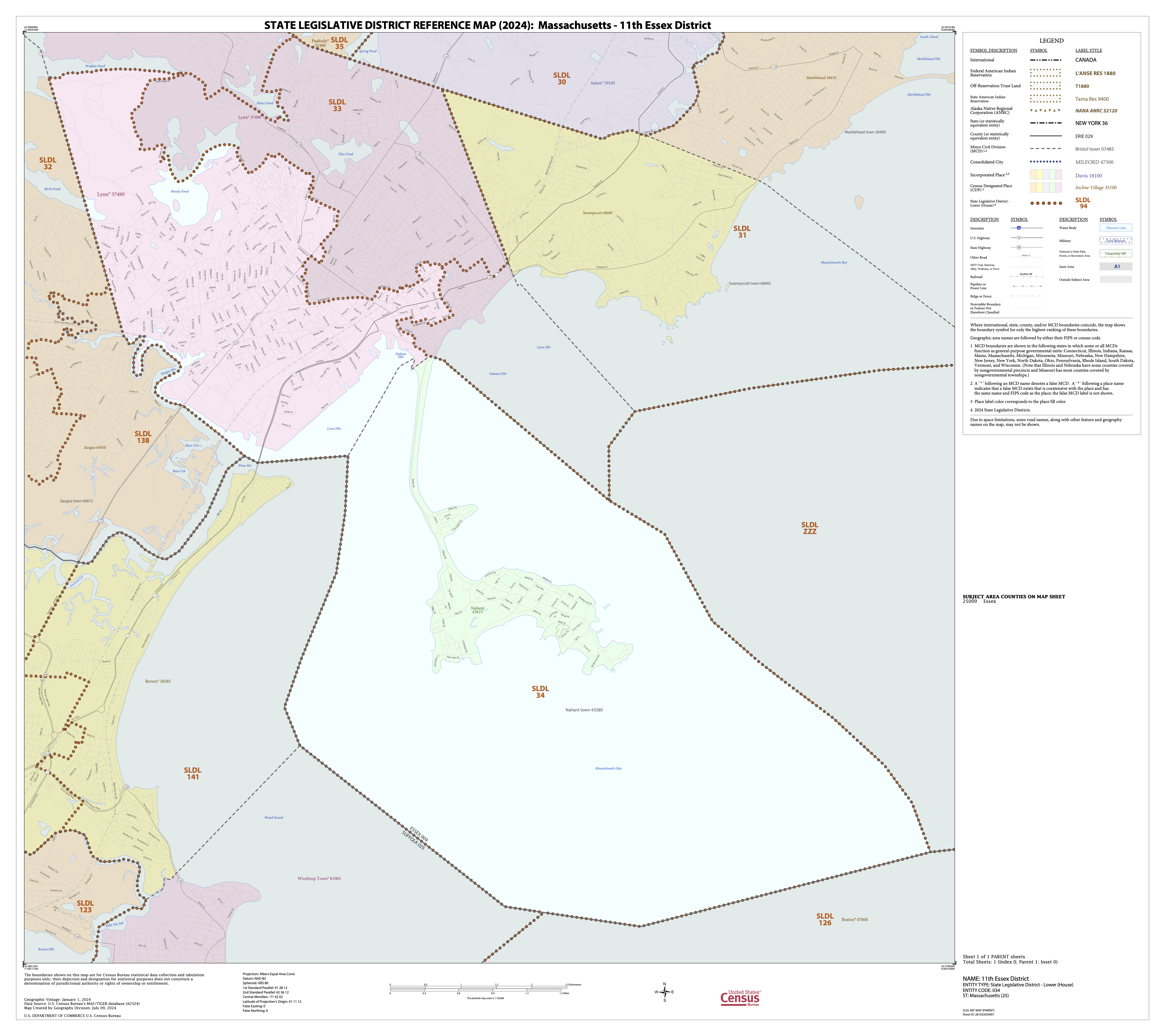
Map of Massachusetts House of Representatives' 11th Essex district, based on the 2020 United States census.

Massachusetts House of Representatives' 11th Essex district is one of 160 districts included in the lower house of the Massachusetts General Court. It covers the town of Nahant and part of the city of Lynn in Essex County. Democrat Sean Reid has represented the district since 2025.

== Locales represented ==
The district includes the following localities:

- part of Lynn
- Nahant

The current district geographic boundary overlaps with that of the Massachusetts Senate's 3rd Essex district.

=== Former locales ===
The district previously covered:

- Danvers, circa 1872
- Wenham, circa 1872

== Representatives ==
- John C. Hoadley, circa 1858
- George W. Benson, circa 1859
- Henry Friend, circa 1888
- Henry Francis Duggan, circa 1920
- Belden Gerald Bly, Jr., circa 1951-1975
- Fred A. Hutchinson, circa 1951
- Thomas M. McGee
- Edward J. Clancy Jr.
- Steven Walsh
- Brendan Crighton
- Peter L. Capano, 2019–2025
- Sean Reid, 2025–present

== See also ==
- List of Massachusetts House of Representatives elections
- Other Essex County districts of the Massachusetts House of Representatives: 1st, 2nd, 3rd, 4th, 5th, 6th, 7th, 8th, 9th, 10th, 12th, 13th, 14th, 15th, 16th, 17th, 18th
- Essex County districts of the Massachusett Senate: 1st, 2nd, 3rd; 1st Essex and Middlesex; 2nd Essex and Middlesex
- List of Massachusetts General Courts
- List of former districts of the Massachusetts House of Representatives

== Images ==
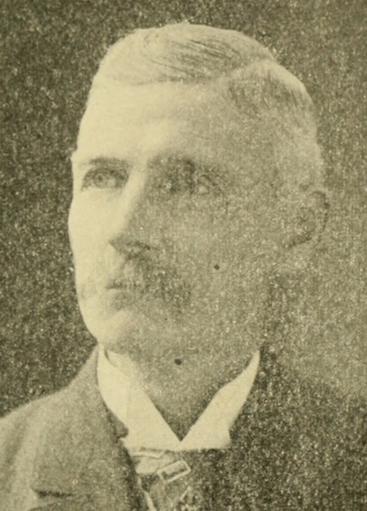
James Carbrey

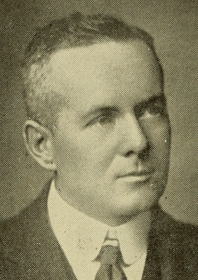
William Mahoney

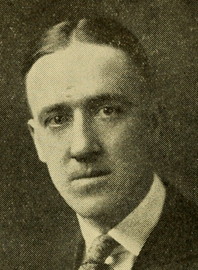
John Alfred Jones

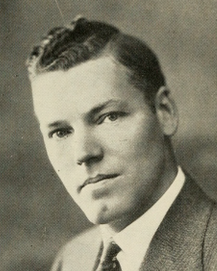
Charles Hogan

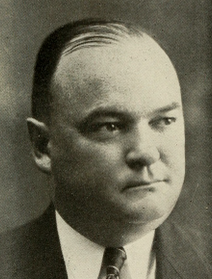
Michael Carroll

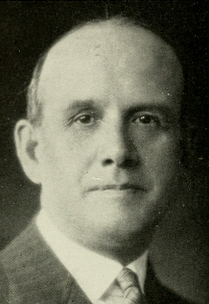
William Baldwin

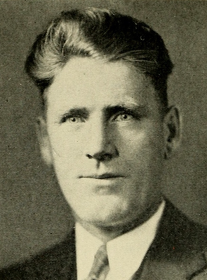
George O'Shea

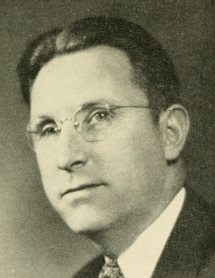
Walter Cuffe

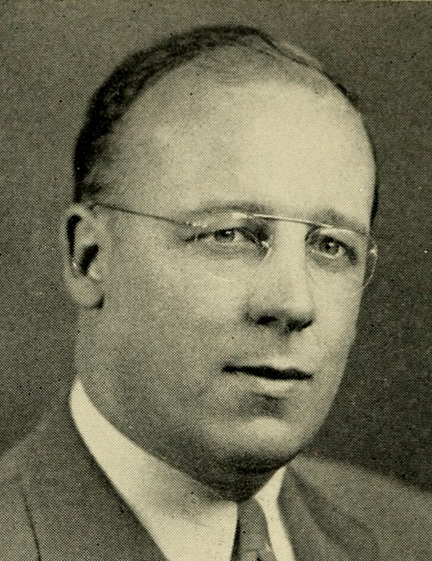
Belden Gerald Bly

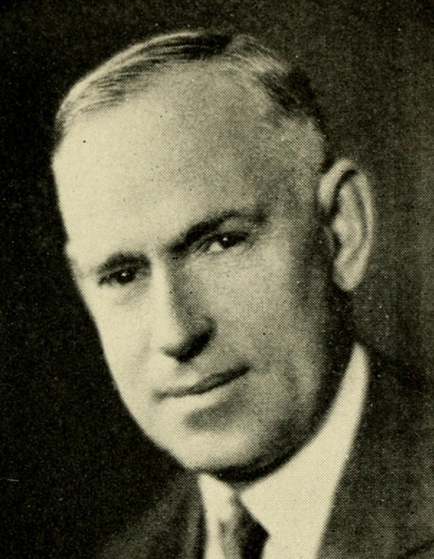
Fred Hutchinson

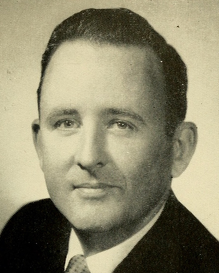
Russell Craig

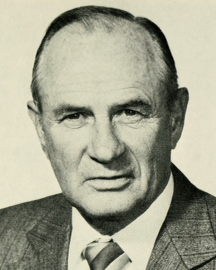
Thomas William McGee

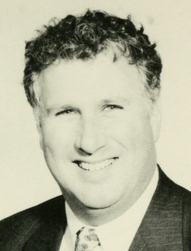
Thomas McGee
