= Brendan Crighton =

American politician

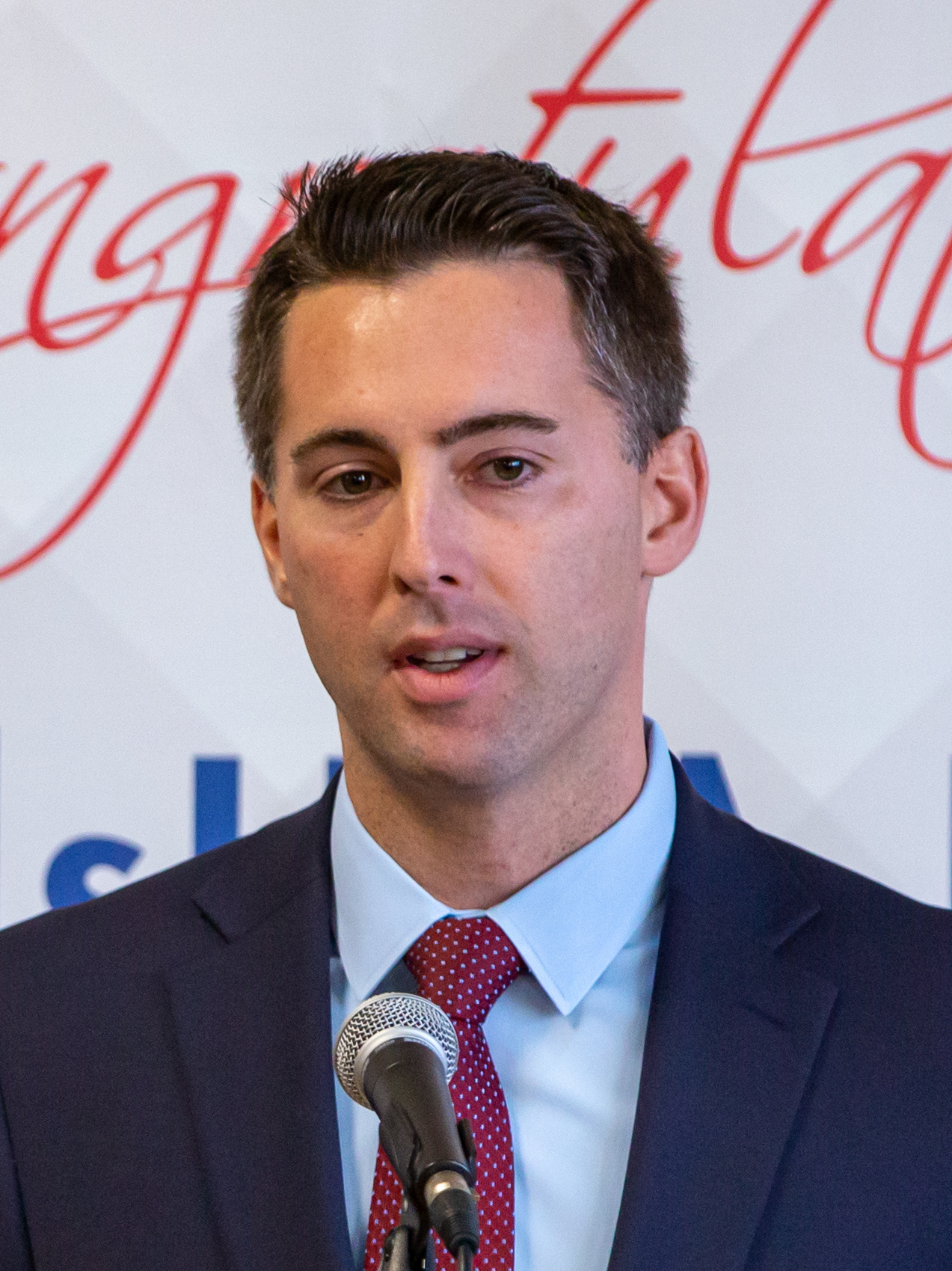
- Crighton in 2019

Member of the Massachusetts Senate from the 3rd Essex district
- Incumbent
- Assumed office March 7, 2018
- Preceded by: Thomas M. McGee

Member of the Massachusetts House of Representatives from the 11th Essex district
- In office January 7, 2014 – March 7, 2018
- Preceded by: Steven Walsh
- Succeeded by: Peter Capano

Personal details
- Born: April 5, 1983 (age 43) Lynn, Massachusetts, U.S.
- Party: Democratic
- Spouse: Andrea Crighton
- Education: Colby College (BA); Suffolk University (MPA)

Brendan P. Crighton (born April 5, 1983) is a Massachusetts politician.

== Early life ==
Mr. Crighton graduated from Lynn Classical High School in 2001. He later graduated from Colby College with a bachelor's degree in government in 2005, and in 2009 received a master's degree in public administration from Suffolk University.

== Political career ==
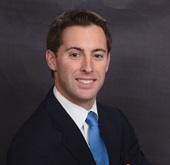
Official portrait

He began his political career working in the office of State Senator Thomas M. McGee, 2005–2015. He was elected as a Lynn city councilor serving first as the Ward 5 Councilor from 2010 to 2014, and at large from 2014 to 2016. He then won a three-way race for the Massachusetts House of Representatives where he served from 2015 to 2018.

He is the only candidate in the 2018 special election to succeed his former boss Thomas McGee, who resigned as State Senator for the Third Essex District. He was elected to the Senate on March 6, 2018. He has been serving in the Massachusetts Senate since March 7, 2018. In 2024, he is the Chairperson of the Joint Committee on Transportation.

== Committee Assignments ==
In the 2025-26 Session, Crighton sits on the following committees in the Senate:

- Juvenile and Emerging Adult Justice - Chairperson
- Transportation - Chairperson
- Personnel and Administration - Vice Chair
- Ethics
- Post Audit and Oversight
- Rules (Senate)
- Ways and Means (Senate)
- Rules (Joint)
- Ways and Means (Joint)

== Task Forces ==
Crighton serves on the following task forces:

- Transportation Funding Task Force

== Personal life ==
He resides in Lynn, Massachusetts with his wife.

== See also ==
- 2019–2020 Massachusetts legislature
- 2021–2022 Massachusetts legislature
