= Karen Swanson =

American politician

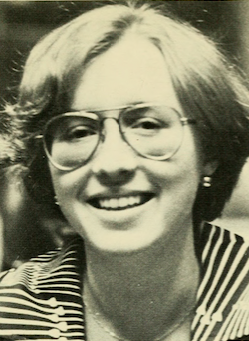
Swanson in 1977

Karen Swanson is an American politician.

Swanson was affiliated with the Democratic Party, and won the 1974 and 1976 elections, serving as a member of the Massachusetts House of Representatives from the 14th Plymouth district.
