= James J. Carrigan =

American politician

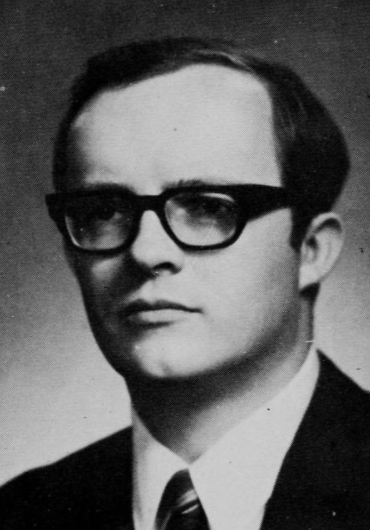

Member of the Massachusetts Senate from the 1st Essex District
- In office 1972–1973
- Preceded by: Charles V. Hogan
- Succeeded by: Walter J. Boverini

Member of the Massachusetts House of Representatives from the 9th Essex District
- In office 1971–1972
- Preceded by: Philip N. Carney
- Succeeded by: Timothy A. Bassett

Personal details
- Born: April 25, 1941 (age 85) Malden, Massachusetts
- Party: Democratic
- Education: Suffolk University; Suffolk University Law School
- Occupation: Teacher; Politician; Attorney

James J. Carrigan (born April 25, 1941) is an American attorney and politician who served in the Massachusetts General Court.

== Early life ==
Carrigan was born on April 25, 1941, in Malden, Massachusetts. He graduated from St. Mary's High School and Suffolk University and went on to work as a teacher.

== Political career ==
In 1970, Carrigan was elected to the Massachusetts House of Representatives. During his first term, state senator Charles V. Hogan died and Carrigan won the special election to succeed him. However, Carrigan was unable to win a full term, as he lost the 1972 Democratic primary to Walter J. Boverini by under 500 votes.

== Legal career ==
Carrigan later returned to Suffolk and earned a Juris Doctor from the Suffolk University Law School. He was admitted to the Massachusetts bar in 1977.
