= 2025 Massachusetts House of Representatives Essex 6 special election =

- May 13, 2025

Massachusetts House of Representatives Essex 6
| Candidate | Hannah Bowen | Medley Long III |
| Party | Democratic | Republican |
| Popular vote | 4,092 | 1,452 |
| Percentage | 73.45% | 26.06% |
- Precinct results Bowen: 50–60% 60–70% 70–80% 80–90%
Representative before election
Jerry Parisella
Democratic
Elected Representative
Hannah Bowen
Democratic

A special election in the U.S. state of Massachusetts was held on May 13, 2025, to elect a new member for the 6th Essex district in the Massachusetts House of Representatives, representing the town of Beverly and a portion of Wenham in Essex County. The election filled vacancy caused by the resignation of Democratic state representative Jerry Parisella upon his appointment to a judgeship. Beverly city councilor Hannah Bowen won the election with 74% of the vote.

== Procedure and background ==
Massachusetts House of Representatives' 6th Essex district since the 2020 United States Census

Voter party registration in the town of Beverly as of February 1, 2025 per the office of the Secretary of State:
1. Democratic (24.0%)
2. Republican (8.11%)
3. Unenrolled (66.8%)
4. Other (1.12%)

Under state law, all vacancies in Congress or the Massachusetts General Court must be filled by special election. The election must take place between 145 and 160 days of the vacancy. The winner of the special election will serve the remainder of the unexpired two-year term. However, if a vacancy is created after February 1 of an even-numbered year, no special election will take place, and the seat will remain vacant until after the next general election.

The election made necessary after incumbent Democrat representative Jerry Parisella, who had served since 2011, was confirmed as a district court judge on December 18, 2024.

Candidates had until March 4 to submit signatures to be placed on the ballot, and until March 14 to withdraw. The primary was held on April 15.

The Essex 6th district consists of the entirety of the town of Beverly and a portion of Wenham. Most of the district's voters reside in the town of Beverly, with over 96 percent of votes cast in 2024 being from that town. In Beverley, Democrats have a voter registration advantage, with 24 percent of registered voters in the town being registered Democrats, as opposed to only 8 percent being Republicans. Nearly 67 percent of voters in the town are not affiliated with any party.

Democratic candidates have won all but one state representative election in Essex 6th since 1970, the earliest available records in the publicly-available Massachusetts Elections Archive. The sole Republican win was by James R. Henry in 1990, who won by 3 points and served for a single term before being defeated in the 1992 general election by Michael P. Cahill by 31 points.

=== Previous results (2010–present) ===
This table shows every election in 6th Essex won by the previous incumbent, Democrat Jerry Parisella.

| Year | Democrats | | | Opponents | | | Write-in | | Mgn. | Ref. |
|---|---|---|---|---|---|---|---|---|---|---|
| 2024 | Jerry Parisella (i) | 16,598 | 71.01% | Ty Vitale (Rep.) | 5,548 | 23.74% | 11 | 0.05% | D+47.27 | |
| 2024 | Jerry Parisella (i) | 16,598 | 71.01% | Eupulio Marciano (Unaff.) | 1,216 | 5.20% | 11 | 0.05% | D+47.27 | |
| 2022 | Jerry Parisella (i) | 14,666 | 98.77% | | | | 183 | 1.23% | D+97.54 | |
| 2020 | Jerry Parisella (i) | 17,910 | 79.82% | Eupulio Marciano (Unaff.) | 4,526 | 20.17% | 2 | 0.01% | D+59.65 | |
| 2018 | Jerry Parisella (i) | 14,615 | 85.35% | Donato Paglia (Unaff.) | 2,500 | 14.60% | 9 | 0.05% | D+70.75 | |
| 2016 | Jerry Parisella (i) | 15,012 | 74.80% | Daniel Fishman (UIP) | 5,045 | 25.14% | 12 | 0.06% | D+49.66 | |
| 2014 | Jerry Parisella (i) | 9,912 | 74.13% | Eupulio Marciano (Unaff.) | 3,458 | 25.86% | 1 | 0.01% | D+48.27 | |
| 2012 | Jerry Parisella (i) | 16,355 | 98.92% | | | | 178 | 1.08% | D+97.84 | |
| 2010 | Jerry Parisella | 9,111 | 60.25% | Brett Schetzsle | 5,996 | 39.65% | 14 | 0.09% | D+20.60 | |

== Democratic primary ==
=== Nominee ===
- Hannah Bowen, Beverly city councilor at-large
- Todd Rotondo, Beverly city council vice president from Ward 1

=== Results ===
Democratic primary precinct results: Bowen: 50–60% 60–70% 70–80% 80–90% / Rotondo: 60–70% 70–80%

2025 Massachusetts House of Representatives Essex 6 special Democratic primary results
| Party | Candidate | Votes | % |
|---|---|---|---|
| Democratic | Hannah Bowen | 2,736 | 57.12% |
| Democratic | Todd Rotondo | 2,054 | 42.88% |
| Total votes | | 4,790 | 100.00% |

== Republican primary ==
=== Nominee ===
- Medley Long III, former Greater Beverly Chamber of Commerce president and businessman

=== Results ===
2025 Massachusetts House of Representatives Essex 6 special Republican primary results
| Party | Candidate | Votes | % |
|---|---|---|---|
| Republican | Medley Long III | 244 | 100.00% |
| Total votes | | 244 | 100.00% |

== General election ==
=== Results ===
2025 Massachusetts House of Representatives Essex 6 special general election results
| Party | Candidate | Votes | % |
|---|---|---|---|
| Democratic | Hannah Bowen | 4,092 | 73.45% |
| Republican | Medley Long III | 1,452 | 26.06% |
| Write-in | Todd C. Rodonto | 27 | 0.49% |
| Total votes | | 5,571 | 100.00% |

==== Results by town ====
| Town | Bowen | | Long III | | Others | | Total | Margin | |
| Town | Votes | Percent | Votes | Percent | Votes | Percent | Votes | Votes | Percent |
|---|---|---|---|---|---|---|---|---|---|
| Beverly | 3,955 | 66.70% | 1,408 | 23.74% | 27 | 0.46% | 5,390 | 2,547 | 42.95% |
| Wenham | 137 | 75.69% | 44 | 24.31% | 0 | 0.00% | 181 | 93 | 51.38% |

== See also ==
- 2025 Massachusetts House of Representatives Bristol 3 special election
