= List of mayors of Beverly, Massachusetts =

This is a list of the past and present mayors of Beverly, Massachusetts.

No.	Picture	Mayor	Term
1		John I. Baker	1895–1895
2		Charles Odell	1896–1896
3		Freeborn Cressy	1897–1897
4		Perry Collier	1898–1898
5		Benjamin D. Webber	1899–1900
6		Samuel Cole	1901–1902
7		Parker S. Davis	1903–1904
8		Joseph A. Wallis	1905–1906
9		S. Harvey Dow	1907–1908
10		Charles Trowt	1909–1910
11		Frederick Dodge	1911–1912
12		Herman A. MacDonald	1913–1916
13		James McPherson	1917–1920
14		Frank D. Tuttle	1921–1922
15		George H. Whittemore	1923–1924
16		William Stopford	1925–1928
17		Roy Patch	1929–1930
18		James A. Torrey	1931–1932
19		Paul S. Eaton	1933–1934
20		James A. Torrey	1935–1936
21		Daniel E. McLean	1937–1948
22		Robert J. Rafferty	1949–1950
23		Clarence Wilkinson	1951–1957
24		Thomas J. Wickers, Jr.	1958–1965
25		Carl V. Joslin	1966–1967
26		James A. Vitale	1968–1969
27		Herbert Grimes	1970–1973
28		James A. Vitale	1974–1977
29		Peter Fortunato	1978–1983
30		F. John Monahan	1984–1993
31		William F. Scanlon, Jr.	1994–2001
32		Thomas M. Crean	2002–2003
33		William F. Scanlon, Jr.	2004–2013
34		Michael P. Cahill	2014–Present
