= F. John Monahan =

American politician (1943–2026)

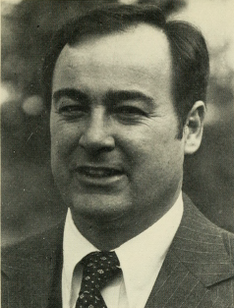
- Monahan in 1981

Mayor of Beverly, Massachusetts
- In office 1984–1994
- Preceded by: Peter Fortunato
- Succeeded by: William F. Scanlon, Jr.

Member of the Massachusetts House of Representatives from the 6th Essex District
- In office 1979–1983
- Preceded by: Francis W. Hatch, Jr.
- Succeeded by: Frances Alexander

Personal details
- Born: July 3, 1943 Beverly, Massachusetts, U.S.
- Died: June 9, 2026 (aged 82)
- Party: Democratic
- Education: Merrimack College
- Occupation: Politician

F. John Monahan (July 3, 1943 – June 9, 2026) was an American politician who served as Mayor of Beverly, Massachusetts, and a member of the Massachusetts House of Representatives.

== Early life ==
Monahan was born on July 3, 1943, in Beverly. He graduated from Beverly High School and Merrimack College. Monahan began his political career as a member of the Beverly Board of Alderman. He also served as an administrator for the state Public Welfare Department.

== Massachusetts General Court ==
In 1978, Monahan was elected to the Massachusetts House of Representatives seat. He was reelected in 1980, but chose not to run for reelection in 1982 and instead ran for 2nd Essex seat in the Massachusetts Senate. He finished second in a six-candidate Democratic primary to Peabody City Councilor Frederick Berry.

== Mayor of Beverly ==
In 1983, Monahan ran to succeed retiring Mayor Peter Fortunato. He finished in first place in the preliminary election and defeated retired Baptist minister John Wilbur in the general election. During his tenure as Mayor, Monahan worked to keep the city more residential than industrial. He championed "slow growth" and opposed developers and the city zoning board, which he believed favored developers. He stopped development on 81 acres of an aquifer. Monahan wanted to see the former United Shoe Manufacturing plant turned into retail space and residences and in 1987, met with Emerson College president Allen E. Koenig to discuss the college relocating there, however neither plan came to fruition during his tenure. The city also reduced its debt, updated its master plan, rebuilt the library system, reorganized the police department, and made repairs to schools while Monahan was mayor. Monahan was criticized by his mayoral opponents for poor financial planning, for his confrontational style, and for his clashes with the police union and school committee.

On July 23, 1988, Monahan was found by Danvers police outside the home of a 22-year-old woman, who Monahan called his "girlfriend". He later told the police that he was not in relationship with the woman, who was part of "a golfing crew" he socialized with, but was infatuated with her. After the incident, Monahan, who was married and had a daughter, checked himself into an out-of-state alcohol treatment center to attend to what he called a "serious drinking problem".

In 1987 and 1989, Monahan finished second in the preliminary election, only to win in the general election. In 1993, he finished third behind William F. Scanlon Jr. and Willard B. Gelwick, ending his mayorship.

== Later political career ==
In 1994, Monahan sought the Democratic nomination for the United States House of Representatives seat in Massachusetts's 6th congressional district. He finished fourth out of four candidates. The following year, he faced Scanlon in a rematch for Mayor, but lost by a wide margin. In 2002, he ran for his old seat in the Massachusetts House of Representatives, which was being vacated by Michael P. Cahill. He lost to Mary E. Grant in the primary 60% to 23%.

== Death ==
Monahan died on June 9, 2026, at the age of 82.

== Electoral results ==
F. John Monahan electoral history

1980 general election for the Massachusetts House of Representatives, 6th Essex District

- F. John Monahan (D) - 9,359 (53.1%)
- Phyllis Dick Morss (R) - 8,257 (46.9%)

1982 Democratic primary for the Massachusetts Senate, 2nd Essex District

- Frederick Berry - 11,532 (32.6%)
- F. John Monahan - 9,955 (28.2%)
- Joseph Centorino - 8,210 (23.2%)
- Neil J. Harrington - 3,384 (9.6%)
- George A. Nowak - 1,608 (4.5%)
- Barry R. Sloane - 658 (1.9%)

1983 Beverly mayoral preliminary election

- F. John Monahan - 4,270 (43.7%)
- John M. Wilbur, Jr. - 2,906 (29.7%)
- Thomas Bussone - 2,496 (25.5%)
- Charles Spinale - 101 (1.0%)

1983 Beverly mayoral general election

- F. John Monahan - 8,009 (60.4%)
- John M. Wilbur, Jr. - 5,242 (39.6%)

1985 Beverly mayoral general election

- F. John Monahan - 6,125 (51.2%)
- John Petronzio - 5,848 (48.8%)

1987 Beverly mayoral preliminary election

- John Petronzio - 2,347 (48.0%)
- F. John Monahan - 2,201 (45.0%)
- Gerald Wallace - 229 (4.7%)
- Matthew Femino - 112 (2.3%)

1987 Beverly mayoral general election

- F. John Monahan - 6,847 (56.9%)
- John Petronzio - 5,186 (43.1%)

1989 Beverly mayoral preliminary election

- Jeffery W. Conley - 2,814 (53.4%)
- F. John Monahan - 2,147 (40.7%)
- Matthew Femino - 186 (5.9%)

1989 Beverly general preliminary election

- F. John Monahan - 6,807 (51.2%)
- Jeffery W. Conley - 6,483 (48.8%)

1991 Beverly mayoral preliminary election

- F. John Monahan - 3,434 (42.2%)
- David Vagos - 2,380 (29.3%)
- Philip Dunkelbarger - 1,833 (22.5%)
- Thomas Drinkwater - 489 (6.0%)

1991 Beverly mayoral general election

- F. John Monahan - 6,728 (54.5%)
- David Vagos - 5,610 (45.5%)

1993 Beverly mayoral preliminary election

- William F. Scanlon Jr. - 5,216 (46.3%)
- Willard B. Gelwick - 4,035 (35.8%)
- F. John Monahan - 1,343 (11.9%)
- Donald K. Hannable - 531 (4.7%)
- Myron E. Hood - 139 (1.2%)

1994 Democratic primary for the United States House of Representatives, Massachusetts's 6th congressional district

- John F. Tierney - 20,701 (33.8%)
- Jeffery Hayward - 20,163 (32.9%)
- Nicholas J. Costello - 15,062 (24.6%)
- F. John Monahan - 5,277 (8.6%)

1995 Beverly mayoral general election

- William F. Scanlon, Jr. - 9,317 (85.0%)
- F. John Monahan - 1,641 (15.0%)

2002 Democratic primary for the Massachusetts House of Representatives, 6th Essex District

- Mary E. Grant - 3,431 (59.6%)
- F. John Monahan - 1,308 (22.7%)
- Ronald F. Costa - 714 (12.4%)
- Robert A. Mounroe - 304 (5.3%)
