= Joseph Wallis =

Joseph Wallis may refer to:

- Joseph Wallis (rugby union), British rugby union player
- Joseph A. Wallis, member of the Massachusetts House of Representatives

== See also ==
- Joe Wallis (Harold Joseph Wallis), American baseball player
