= Allison G. Catheron =

American politician

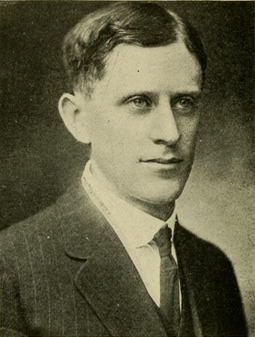
- Catheron c. 1915

Member of the Massachusetts House of Representatives from the 20th Essex district
- In office 1913–1916 Serving with Alvah J. Bradstreet
- Preceded by: Herman A. MacDonald; John L. Saltonstall Sr.
- Succeeded by: Frank E. Raymond

Personal details
- Born: June 26, 1878 Kempt, Nova Scotia
- Died: January 8, 1950 (aged 71) Wellesley, Massachusetts
- Resting place: Central Cemetery; Beverly, Massachusetts
- Party: Republican
- Education: Bates College; Harvard Law School
- Occupation: Lawyer

Allison G. Catheron was a Canadian-born American politician who served in the Massachusetts House of Representatives.

== Early life ==
Catheron was born on June 26, 1878, in Kempt, Nova Scotia. His family moved to Beverly, Massachusetts, during his youth. Catheron attended Beverly High School and graduated from Bates College in 1900. From 1900 to 1902 he was principal of Norwell High School in Norwell, Massachusetts. Catheron earned an LLB from Harvard Law School.

== Political career ==
From 1913 to 1916, Catheron represented the 20th Essex District in the Massachusetts House of Representatives.

On December 18, 1916, he was appointed chief probation officer for the Suffolk County Superior Criminal Court. His appointment was protested by District Attorney Joseph C. Pelletier, who believed that the position should've gone to someone who resided within Suffolk County. He also accused Catheron of being a member of the American Protective Association. The Pilot, the official newspaper of the Roman Catholic Archdiocese of Boston criticized Catheron's appointment in an editorial entitled "Bigotry Rewarded. An Unfortunate Appointment". Catheron denied being a member of the APA and stated that he was "incapable of prejudice". Boston Mayor James Michael Curley ordered his Corporation Counsel to investigate the legality of Catheron's appointment and ordered the City Auditor to withhold his pay until the investigation was concluded. On July 2, 1917, the Massachusetts Supreme Court ruled that Catheron's appointment was legal.

Catheron also served on the Beverly School Committee and the State Commission on Probation.

== Later life ==
Catheron was a partner at Ropes, Gray, Boyden & Perkins. He died on January 8, 1950. At the time of his death, Catheron resided in Wellesley, Massachusetts.

== See also ==
- 1915 Massachusetts legislature
- 1916 Massachusetts legislature
