= Alfred Marshall (businessman) =

American businessman

- Born: February 28, 1919; Lawrence, Massachusetts, US
- Died: December 28, 2013 (aged 94); Boca Raton, Florida, US
- Occupation: Businessman
- Known for: Founding Marshalls
- Spouse(s): Marirose Pelletier (first wife); Estelle Newberg (second wife)
- Children: 3

Alfred Marshall (February 28, 1919 – December 28, 2013) was an American businessman who founded Marshalls, a chain of department stores which specializes in overstocked, irregular and out-of-season name brand clothing sold at deeply discounted prices. He opened the original Marshalls in 1956 in Beverly, Massachusetts.

== Early life ==
Marshall was born on February 28, 1919, to a prosperous Jewish family in Lawrence, Massachusetts, the son of Annie (née Spector) and Louis Marshall. His father abandoned the family after he lost everything in the Great Depression. In 1937, he graduated from Beverly High School in Beverly, Massachusetts, shortly before working for the United States Navy as a civilian underwater welder. He went to Hawaii as a civilian welder for the Navy after the attack on Pearl Harbor occurred, and worked on repairing the damaged ships. Marshall returned to Beverly after the end of the war, where he married the former Marirose Pelletier, his first wife.

== Business career ==
Marshall began his post-war career by working as a welder and contractor. He then purchased a fruit stand, which he expanded into a supermarket. By the 1950s, Marshall was selling wholesale products out of his supermarket, including sundries, baby supplies, and cosmetics. In 1956, Alfred Marshall opened a new addition to his existing supermarket, located in Beverly, Massachusetts, utilizing funding provided by two business partners. This location became the first Marshall's department store. (The company later dropped the apostrophe from the name). The original Marshalls location remained open for decades. However, the first store eventually closed and is currently the site of another supermarket, as of 2014.

Alfred Marshall and his business partners expanded the chain throughout the 1960s and 1970s. Marshalls had 36 locations throughout New England and California by 1976, which were directly owned by Marshall and three other business partners. The partners sold Marshalls to the Melville Corporation in 1976. Marshalls was next acquired by TJX Companies, which also owns T.J. Maxx and HomeGoods, in 1995. Marshalls had 496 locations at the time of the 1995 acquisition. As of 2012, there were 904 Marshalls stores worldwide.

== Retirement ==
Marshall died from a short illness in Boca Raton, Florida, on December 28, 2013, at the age of 94. His first wife, Marirose, died in 2001, and his second wife was Estelle Newberg. He had three children - Ronald Marshall, Jan Marshall and Deborah Miller. A resident of Boca Raton at the time, Marshall's funeral service was held at Temple B'nai Abraham in his hometown of Beverly, Massachusetts, and he was buried at Sons of Abraham Cemetery.
