= Daniel E. McLean =

American politician

Saugus, Massachusetts Town Manager
- In office 1956–1958
- Preceded by: Walter E. Lawrence
- Succeeded by: John B. Kennedy

Mayor of Beverly, Massachusetts
- In office 1937–1949
- Preceded by: James A. Torrey
- Succeeded by: Robert J. Rafferty

Personal details
- Died: May 25, 1980 (aged 82) Beverly, Massachusetts, U.S.
- Party: Republican
- Occupation: City Administrator; Politician

Daniel E. "Chick" McLean was an American politician who served as Mayor of Beverly, Massachusetts, City Manager of Haverhill, Massachusetts, Town Manager of Saugus, Massachusetts, Chairman of the Massachusetts Republican Party, and Chairman of the Massachusetts Appellate Tax Board.

McLean got his start in politics as a member of the Beverly Board of Aldermen. He was then elected Mayor of Beverly from 1937 to 1949. After six consecutive two-year terms, McLean chose not to run for reelection. He then served as Deputy Chairman of the Massachusetts Republican State Committee from 1949 to 1950. In 1950, McLean was a candidate for Lieutenant Governor of Massachusetts. He finished fourth in the Republican primary with 11.64% of the vote. In 1951, he was appointed to the Massachusetts Public Building Commission.

In 1951, McLean was named City Manager of Haverhill, Massachusetts. He then served as Town Manager of Saugus, Massachusetts from 1956 to 1958.

In 1958, McLean was elected Chairman of the Massachusetts Republican State Committee. In 1960 he played a key role in John A. Volpe's successful effort to win the party's endorsement at the state Republican Convention. Volpe later won the Republican nomination and defeated Democrat Joseph D. Ward in the general election.

In 1961, Volpe appointed McLean to serve as Chairman of the State Appellate Tax Board, a position he held until his retirement in March 1980. McLean also served as a member of the State Industrial Accident Board.

In 1978, McLean broke with the Republican Party endorsed Democrat Edward J. King over liberal Republican and fellow Beverly resident Francis W. Hatch, Jr.

McLean died on May 25, 1980, at Beverly Hospital at the age of 82.

Party political offices
Preceded by Charles Gibbons	Chairman of the Massachusetts Republican State Committee; 1958–1961	Succeeded by Philip K. Allen
