= Mary Elizabeth Heffernan =

American judge

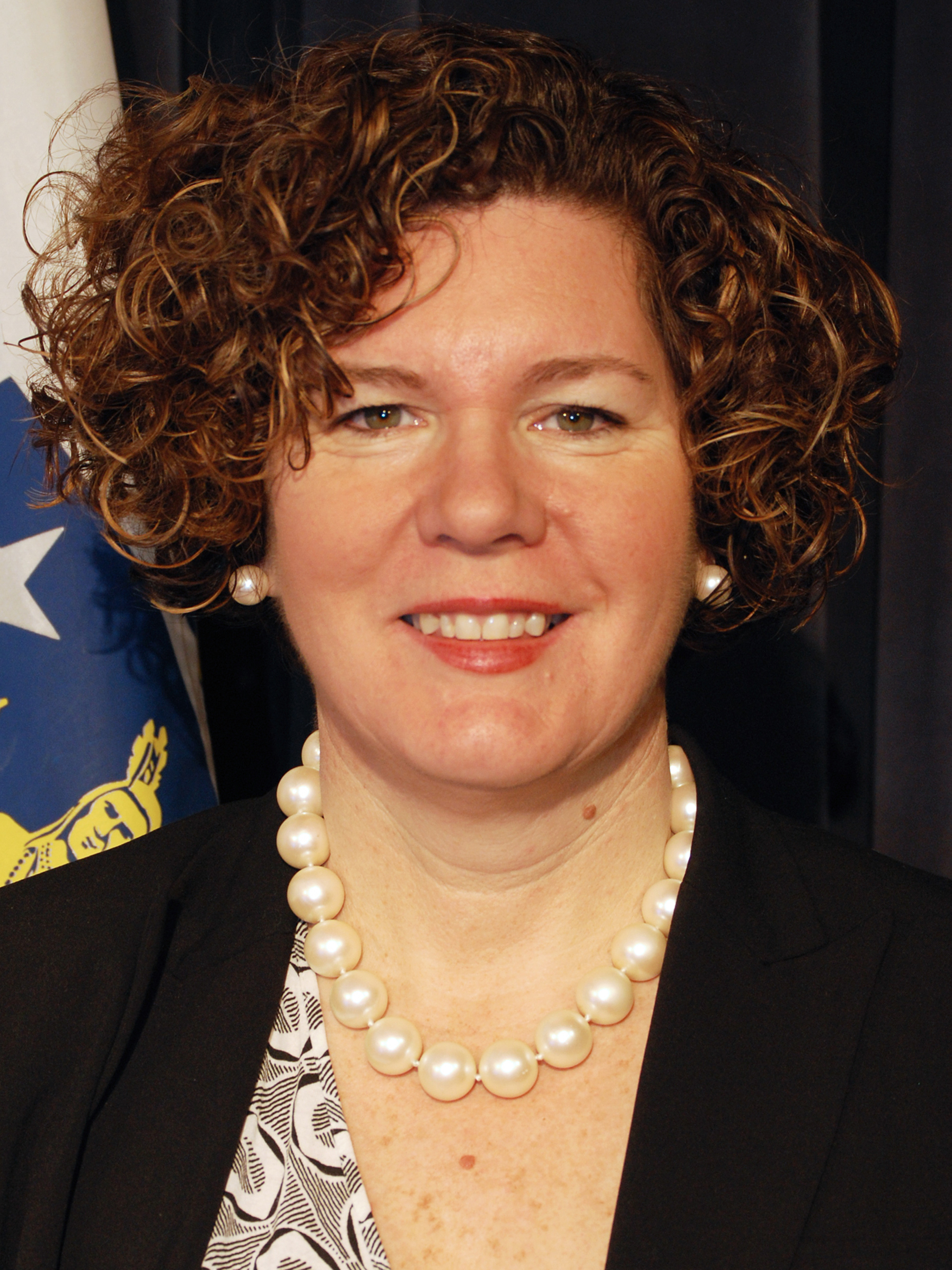
- Official portrait, 2010

Massachusetts Secretary of Public Safety
- In office 2010–2013
- Governor: Deval Patrick
- Preceded by: Kevin M. Burke
- Succeeded by: Andrea Cabral

Personal details
- Education: Framingham State College; Suffolk University; Suffolk University Law School

Mary Elizabeth Heffernan is an American attorney, judge, and former Massachusetts Secretary of Public Safety. She previously served as the Undersecretary of Criminal Justice from 2007 to 2010. She is also a former Assistant District Attorney for Middlesex County.

== Biography ==
Heffernan is an alumnus of Framingham State College, Suffolk University Law School, and Suffolk University School of Management. She is a member of the Framingham State University Board of Trustees. She resides in West Roxbury with her two children.

In the private sector, Heffernan served as the Associate General Counsel and Director of Intergovernmental and Regulatory Affairs at Beth Israel Deaconess Medical Center and as the Corporate Director of Government Relations for CareGroup Health Care System.

In 2017, she was appointed as Newton District Court judge.

== Controversy ==
Soon after her appointment as a Newton District Court judge, she released a suspected rapist – who was in the country illegally and had previously deported – on $2,500 bail despite a request by the district attorney for a much higher bail of $100,000 and despite knowing that U.S. Immigration and Customs Enforcement (ICE) was preparing a detainer for the suspect. In addition prosecutors during the hearing informed Judge Heffernan that the suspect was well known to them as a gang member in the city and was a very high flight risk. Furthermore, not wanting to further inconvenience the suspect allowed him to remain at the courthouse while bail was posted instead of sending him back to the jail awaiting bond to be posted. The suspect failed to appear at his next court date.
