= Cornelius Murray =

American dentist and politician

Member of the Massachusetts House of Representatives from the 15th Essex district
- In office 1943–1965
- Preceded by: James Robbins Reynolds
- Succeeded by: Abraham L. Cohn

Personal details
- Born: August 19, 1890 Beverly, Massachusetts, U.S.
- Died: October 19, 1972 (aged 82) Beverly, Massachusetts, U.S.
- Party: Republican
- Education: Tufts Dental School
- Occupation: Dentist; State representative

Dr. Cornelius Joseph "Doc" Murray (August 19, 1890 – October 19, 1972) was an American dentist and politician who served as a member of the Massachusetts House of Representatives.

Murray was born on August 19, 1890, in Beverly Farms. He graduated from Beverly High School, where he was a noted athlete. In 1913 he graduated from Tufts Dental School and practiced in Beverly until his retirement in 1962.

Murray represented Ward 6 on the Beverly Board of Alderman from 1931 to 1942 and was a member of the Massachusetts House of Representatives from 1943 to 1965. During his tenure in the House, Murray was credited with providing road funding for his district (which consisted of Beverly, Hamilton, and Wenham), including funding to improve Route 127. He was also in leader in the successful fight to extend Route 128 to Gloucester, Massachusetts. Outside of the House, Murray was the president of the North Shore Community College board of advisors.

Murray died on October 19, 1972, at Beverly Hospital.
