= Philip K. Allen =

American educator and politician

Member of the Massachusetts Senate from the 4th Essex District
- In office 1947–1949
- Preceded by: Clifford Cusson
- Succeeded by: John W. Coddaire Jr.

Personal details
- Born: January 3, 1910 Walpole, Massachusetts
- Died: March 1, 1996 (aged 86) Westwood, Massachusetts
- Party: Republican
- Education: Yale University
- Occupation: Teacher; School Administrator; Politician

Philip Kirkham "P.K." Allen (born January 3, 1910, in Walpole, Massachusetts, died March 1, 1996, in Westwood, Massachusetts ) was an American educator and politician who represented the 4th Essex District in the Massachusetts Senate from 1947 to 1949 and served as Chairman of the Massachusetts Republican State Committee from 1961 to 1963.

== Early life ==
Allen was born and raised in Walpole, Massachusetts. He attended Walpole public schools, Phillips Academy (Class of 1929), and Yale University (Class of 1933).

== Teaching ==
After graduating from Yale, Allen coached and taught English at The Cambridge School of Weston. In 1936 he joined the faculty of Phillips Academy as a teacher, coach and assistant registrar.

== Politics ==
Allen was elected to the Massachusetts Senate in 1946. He lost his 1948 reelection bid to Democrat John W. Coddaire Jr.

In 1951 Allen was named executive secretary of the Republican State Committee. From 1953 to 1955 he was the chief clerk of the United States Senate Committee on Armed Services. From 1955 to 1957 he was the executive assistant to Frederick A. Seaton, the Assistant Secretary of Defense for Legislative and Public Affairs.

Allen returned to Massachusetts in 1957 as the assistant general manager for finance at WGBH-TV and WGBH radio.

On March 11, 1961, Allen was elected Chairman of the Republican State Committee. He resigned this position in April 1963 due to personal and business reasons.

== Later life ==
Allen died on March 1, 1996, in Westwood, Massachusetts.

== See also ==
- 1947–1948 Massachusetts legislature

Party political offices
Preceded by Daniel E. McLean	Chairman of the Massachusetts Republican State Committee; 1961–1963	Succeeded by Frederic C. Dumaine Jr.
