= Joseph Cairnes =

American engineer, baseball executive

Massachusetts Commissioner of Public Works
- In office 1946–1947
- Preceded by: Herman A. MacDonald
- Succeeded by: William H. Buracker

Personal details
- Born: May 26, 1907 Somerville, Massachusetts, U.S.
- Died: March 3, 1993 (aged 85) Palm Beach, Florida, U.S.
- Occupation: Engineer; Baseball executive

Joseph Francis Cairnes (May 26, 1907 – March 3, 1993) was an American engineer and baseball executive. He served as president of the Milwaukee Braves of Major League Baseball from 1957 through 1958.

== Biography ==
Cairnes, the 13th of 13 children, was born in Somerville, Massachusetts, and educated in Boston.

He trained as an engineer, and served as director of public works for Massachusetts.

Cairnes joined the front office of the Boston Braves in 1947 as director of their farm system. He was promoted to executive vice president in 1953. Cairnes succeeded Lou Perini as team president in 1957, when Perini was elected chairman of the board.

During his presidency, Cairnes attempted to negotiate with the county to build a new baseball stadium.

The 1957 Milwaukee Braves season was their fifth in Milwaukee, the 87th overall season for the franchise and was the year the team won its first and only World Series championship while based in Milwaukee, winning 95 games, losing 59, to win the National League pennant by eight games over the second-place St. Louis Cardinals.

The club went on to appear in the 1957 World Series where they faced the New York Yankees and won the championship.

Cairnes won the Sam Levy Award in 1958, given by the Milwaukee chapter of the Baseball Writers' Association of America for meritorious contributions to baseball in the Milwaukee area.

Cairnes and his wife, Helen, had six children.

He died as a result of heart failure on March 3, 1993, at the age of 85.
