= Jonathan W. Blodgett =

American lawyer and politician

District Attorney of Essex County, Massachusetts
- In office 2003–2023
- Preceded by: Kevin M. Burke
- Succeeded by: Paul Tucker

Personal details
- Party: Democratic
- Education: Princeton University; Suffolk University Law School
- Occupation: Attorney

Jonathan W. Blodgett is an American attorney and politician who served as district attorney of Essex County, Massachusetts from 2003 to 2023.

== Early life ==
A life-long resident of Peabody, Massachusetts, Blodgett graduated from Peabody Veterans Memorial High School and Princeton University. He was an aide to President of the Massachusetts Senate Kevin B. Harrington from 1977 to 1978, and Peabody state representative and later majority leader John E. Murphy Jr. from 1978 to 1985. Blodgett graduated from Suffolk University Law School in 1985 and was an assistant Essex district attorney from 1985 to 1986.

Blodgett was a member of the Peabody planning board for 15 years and was also a member of the city's park commission and school building committee. He served as counsel for the Essex County government from 1992 until its abolition in 1999 and was general counsel for the Peabody Municipal Light Plant.

== District attorney ==
In 2002, he defeated John J. Burke and Rick Grundy for the Democratic nomination for district attorney of Essex County. He was unopposed in the general election and did not face another opponent in his 20 years as district attorney. He did not seek reelection in 2022 and left office at the end of his term.
