= William Stopford =

American politician

Mayor of Beverly, Massachusetts
- In office 1925–1928
- Preceded by: George H. Whittemore
- Succeeded by: Roy Patch

Adjutant General of Massachusetts
- In office 1905–1906
- Preceded by: Samuel Dalton
- Succeeded by: James A. Frye

Member of the Massachusetts Senate from the 2nd Essex District
- In office 1891–1891
- Succeeded by: William Edwin Meade

Personal details
- Born: February 22, 1848 Manchester, England
- Died: September 11, 1928 (aged 80) Beverly, Massachusetts
- Party: Democratic Party

Military service
- Allegiance: United States
- Branch/service: Massachusetts State Militia
- Years of service: 1865–1866; 1875–1880; 1882–1906
- Rank: Major general

William Stopford (February 22, 1848 – September 11, 1928) was an English-born American military officer and politician who served as Adjutant General of Massachusetts and Mayor of Beverly, Massachusetts.

== Early life ==
Stopford was born on February 22, 1848, in Manchester, England. His parents emigrated to the United States when he was two years old and settled in Boston's Roxbury neighborhood. At the age of 20, Stopford moved to Beverly to attend private school.

== Military career ==
At the age of fifteen, Stopford attempted to enlist in a Hundred Days regiment, but was rejected due to his youth and small size. In 1865 he joined the Co D. Roxbury house guards. In 1875 he joined the 2nd corps of cadets of Salem as a private. He served in this command until 1885.

After one year out of the militia he reenlisted. In 1888 he was discharged from the Salem cadets and was promoted to second lieutenant in Co E., the Beverly company of the 8th regiment. By the time the Spanish–American War broke out, Stopford was the senior major of the regiment and was mustered into the United States Army and promoted to Lieutenant Colonel. The 8th regiment was not given a combat detail and after the war, Stopford returned to his old position as major of the 8th regiment.

In 1905, Stopford was appointed Adjutant General of Massachusetts by Governor William Lewis Douglas. According to The Boston Daily Globe, his appointment was said to be due to the influence of his friend John J. Flaherty, a captain in the 8th regiment and chairman of the executive committee of the Massachusetts Democratic Party. Stopford retired from the militia on January 4, 1906, as a major general.

== Business career ==
After moving to Beverly, Stopford worked in the wholesale and retail fishing business. He had stores in Salem, Beverly, and Peabody and a plant in Port Clyde, Maine.

== Political career ==
Stopford was a member of the Democratic Party. In 1890, Stopford was a candidate for the Massachusetts Senate in the 2nd Essex district. He gained the support of many Republicans and was able to win the election.

The Republicans united behind William Edwin Meade the following year and Stopford was defeated 3,701 votes to 3,193. He was a member of Beverly's last board of selectmen before Beverly adopted a city government in 1895. Stopford ran for the 19th Essex Massachusetts House of Representatives seat in 1896. He finished fourth in a district in which the top two vote getters were elected.

In 1924, Stopford was elected Mayor of Beverly. He was reelected in 1926, but he resigned on February 6, 1928, at the recommendation of his physician. During his tenure as Mayor, the city's bond indebtedness decreased and the McKay School was built.

Stoppford died on September 11, 1928, at his home in Beverly.
