= Abraham L. Cohn =

American politician

Member of the Massachusetts House of Representatives from the 4th Essex district
- In office 1965–1966
- Preceded by: Cornelius Murray
- Succeeded by: Thomas Bussone

Personal details
- Born: May 24, 1898 Haverhill, Massachusetts
- Died: May 23, 1966 (aged 68) Beverly, Massachusetts
- Party: Republican
- Occupation: Store owner

Abraham L. Cohn (May 24, 1898 – May 23, 1966) was an American politician who served part of one term in the Massachusetts House of Representatives.

Cohn was born on May 24, 1898, in Haverhill, Massachusetts. He attended public schools in Beverly, Massachusetts.

Cohn served as a member of the Beverly board of aldermen, citizen's urban renewal commission, and recreation commission. In 1964, he was elected to the Massachusetts House of Representatives as a Republican. Outside of politics, Cohn, along with his son Arlen was the proprietor of Alcon's Clothing Store in Beverly.

On May 23, 1966, Cohn collapsed at a meeting of the Beverly Mental Health Association and was rushed to Beverly Hospital, where he died later that night.
