= Kevin M. Burke =

American politician

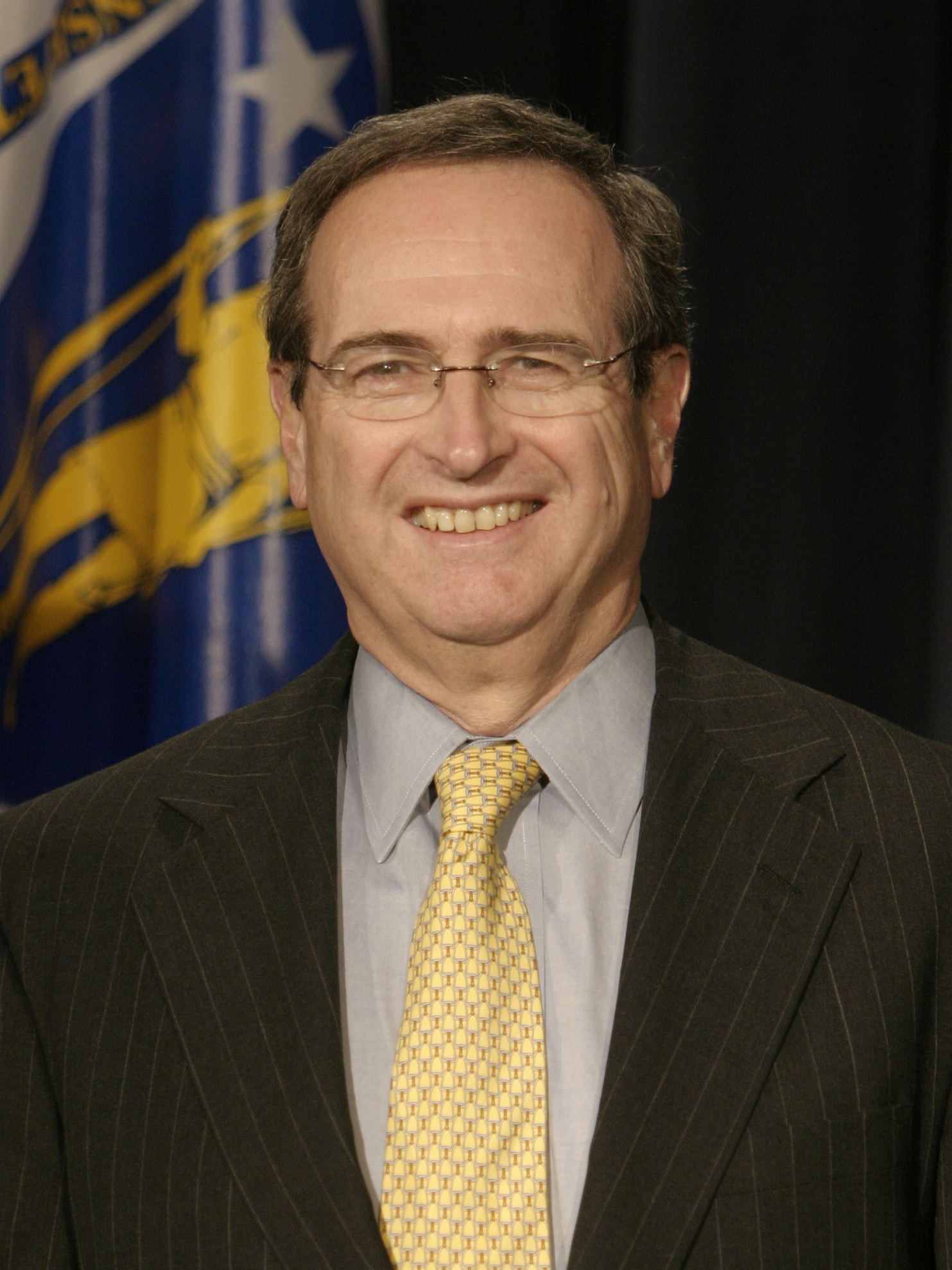
- Official portrait, 2007

Massachusetts Secretary of Public Safety
- In office 2007–2010
- Governor: Deval Patrick
- Preceded by: Robert C. Haas
- Succeeded by: Mary Elizabeth Heffernan

District Attorney of Essex County
- In office January 1979 – January 2003
- Preceded by: John P. S. Burke
- Succeeded by: Jonathan W. Blodgett

Member of the Massachusetts House of Representatives from the 4th Essex district
- In office January 1, 1975 – January 3, 1979
- Preceded by: Thomas Bussone
- Succeeded by: Forrester Clark

Personal details
- Born: Kevin Michael Burke; December 7, 1946 (age 79) Somerville, Massachusetts, U.S.
- Party: Democratic
- Education: University of Connecticut (BA); Boston College (JD)
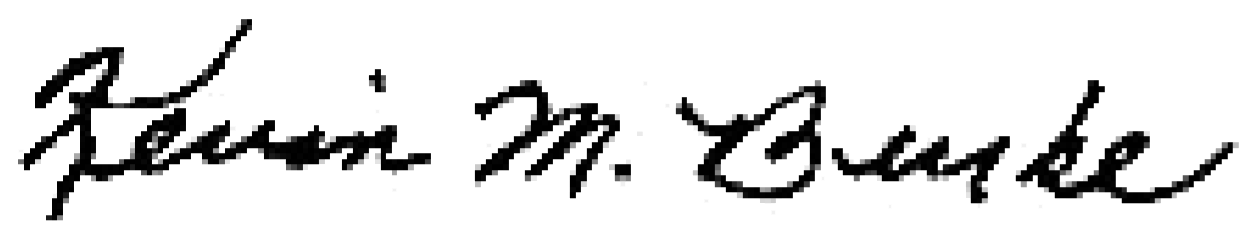
- Signature

Kevin Michael Burke (born December 7, 1946) is an American lawyer and politician from Massachusetts.

== Early life and education ==
Burke was born in Somerville, Massachusetts and graduated from Beverly High School in 1964. He then graduated from the University of Connecticut with a Bachelor of Arts degree in liberal sciences in 1968 and from Boston College Law School with a Juris Doctor in 1971.

== Political career ==
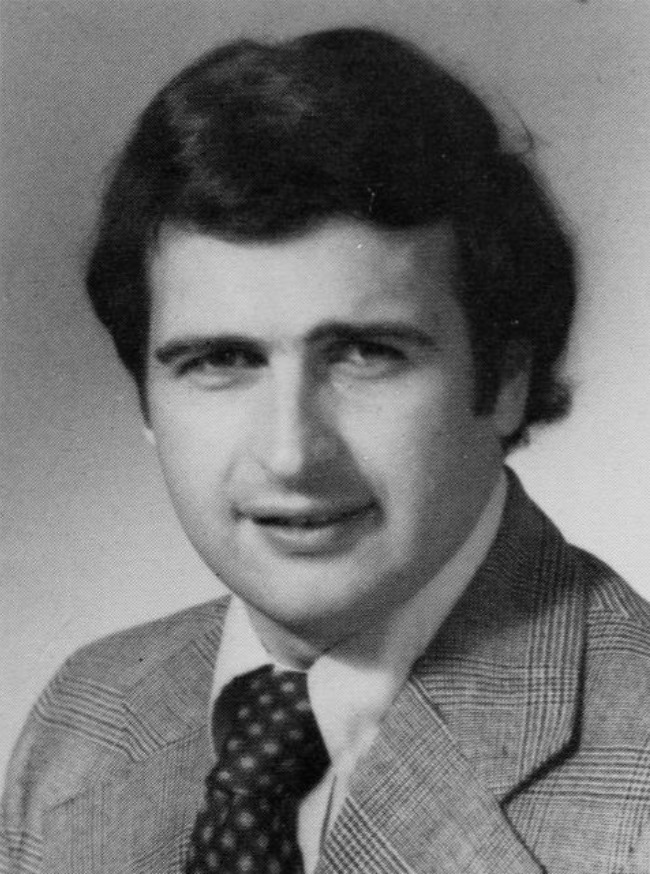
Burke as a state representative.

He served in the Massachusetts House of Representatives representing the 4th Essex district from 1975 to 1979 as a Democrat and served as the District Attorney of Essex County, Massachusetts from 1979 to 2003. From 2007 to 2010 he served as the Massachusetts Secretary of Public Safety under Governor Deval Patrick.

== Legal career ==
After leaving the Essex County District Attorney's Office he practiced law with Burke & Mawn Consultants and later Gadsby Hannah LLP.

In 2017 he was appointed by Massachusetts State Police Superintendent Colonel Kerry Gilpin to lead an investigation into the arrest of Alli Bibaud, the daughter of Dudley district court judge Timothy Bibaud.

On April 27, 2018, the Massachusetts State Police released its own report on the investigation and review of the scandal involving a redacted police report for the arrest of a judge's daughter and the discipline of two state troopers. Burke along with Nancy McGillivray, former United States Marshal for the District of Massachusetts concluded that former State Police Colonel Richard McKeon used "flawed judgment" in ordering the redaction of the arrest report.

== Personal life ==
He lives with his wife Patricia in Beverly. The couple has three children.
