= Herman A. MacDonald =

American politician

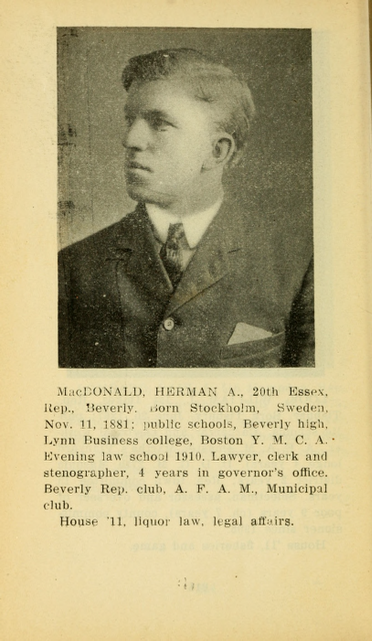

Massachusetts Commissioner of Public Works
- In office 1941–1946
- Preceded by: John W. Beal
- Succeeded by: Joseph Cairnes

Mayor of Beverly, Massachusetts
- In office 1913–1916
- Preceded by: Frederick Dodge
- Succeeded by: James McPherson

Member of the Massachusetts House of Representatives from the 20th Essex district
- In office 1911–1912 Serving with John L. Saltonstall Sr
- Preceded by: A. Preston Chase; Parker S. Davis
- Succeeded by: Allison G. Catheron; Alvah J. Bradstreet

Personal details
- Born: November 11, 1881 Stockholm
- Died: January 4, 1961 (aged 79) Londonderry, New Hampshire
- Party: Republican
- Education: Lynn Business College; Boston Y.M.C.A. Evening Law School

Herman A. MacDonald was a Swedish-born American politician who served as Mayor of Beverly, Massachusetts and Massachusetts Commissioner of Public Works.

== Early life ==
MacDonald was born in Stockholm on November 11, 1881. His father died several months before he was born and when he was three years old, he and his mother moved to the United States. They settled in Beverly, Massachusetts. He became a U.S. citizen when his mother was naturalized, but was not formally naturalized himself until 1920, which became an issue during his political career.

MacDonald attended Beverly High School, Lynn Business College, and the Boston Y.M.C.A. Evening Law School. In 1910 he was admitted to the Massachusetts Bar.

== Political career ==
From 1906 to 1910, MacDonald worked as a clerk and stenographer in office of governors Curtis Guild Jr. and Eben Sumner Draper.

From 1911 to 1912 MacDonald represented the 20th Essex District in the Massachusetts House of Representatives. During his tenure in the House, MacDonald guided a piece of railroad-related legislation known as the season ticket bill and a bill requesting the investigation of construction of a new bridge and dam between Salem and Beverly, through the Massachusetts General Court. He served on the Committee on Legal Affairs and the Committee on Liquor Law.

From 1913 to 1916, MacDonald was Mayor of Beverly. Taking office at the age of 32, he was the youngest person to hold the position.

In January 1921, MacDonald was appointed secretary to governor Channing Cox. He later resigned to serve as recorder of the Massachusetts Land Court, but on January 1, 1925, he became secretary to governor Alvan T. Fuller. In 1928, former registrar of motor vehicles Frank A. Goodwin alleged that MacDonald ran the state while Governor Fuller was absent, which was "pretty much of all the time during the past four years".

In December 1928, MacDonald was appointed Associate Commissioner of Public Works by Governor Fuller. His term of office expired on December 1, 1932, but remained in office until January 1934, when Democratic Governor Joseph Ely replaced him with Richard K. Hale.

In 1934, MacDonald was a candidate for state treasurer. At the party convention, MacDonald finished in last place on the first ballot with 84 votes to Oscar M. Dionne's 279, Samuel H. Wragg's 170, and Richard E. Johnston's 99, and withdrew his candidacy.

In 1935 he ran in the 2nd Essex District state senate special election following the death of Albert Pierce. He lost the Republican nomination to William H. McSweeney.

In 1940, MacDonald was appointed Commissioner of Public Works by Governor Leverett Saltonstall. He was removed from the position in 1946 by Governor Maurice J. Tobin on the grounds that he had inefficiently managed the Federally-funded roads program.

From 1947 to 1949, MacDonald served on the state Appellate Tax Board.

== Military service ==
In 1915, MacDonald took a leave of absence from his position as mayor to serve on the U.S.-Mexican Border as a second lieutenant with the 1st Massachusetts Field Artillery during the Border War. During World War I he served as a field artillery captain with the 26th Infantry "Yankee" Division in France.

== Personal life ==
On April 29, 1928, MacDonald married Marion S. Young of Boston at the Old South Church in Boston.

On January 4, 1961, MacDonald died in Londonderry, New Hampshire.
