= Beverly High School =

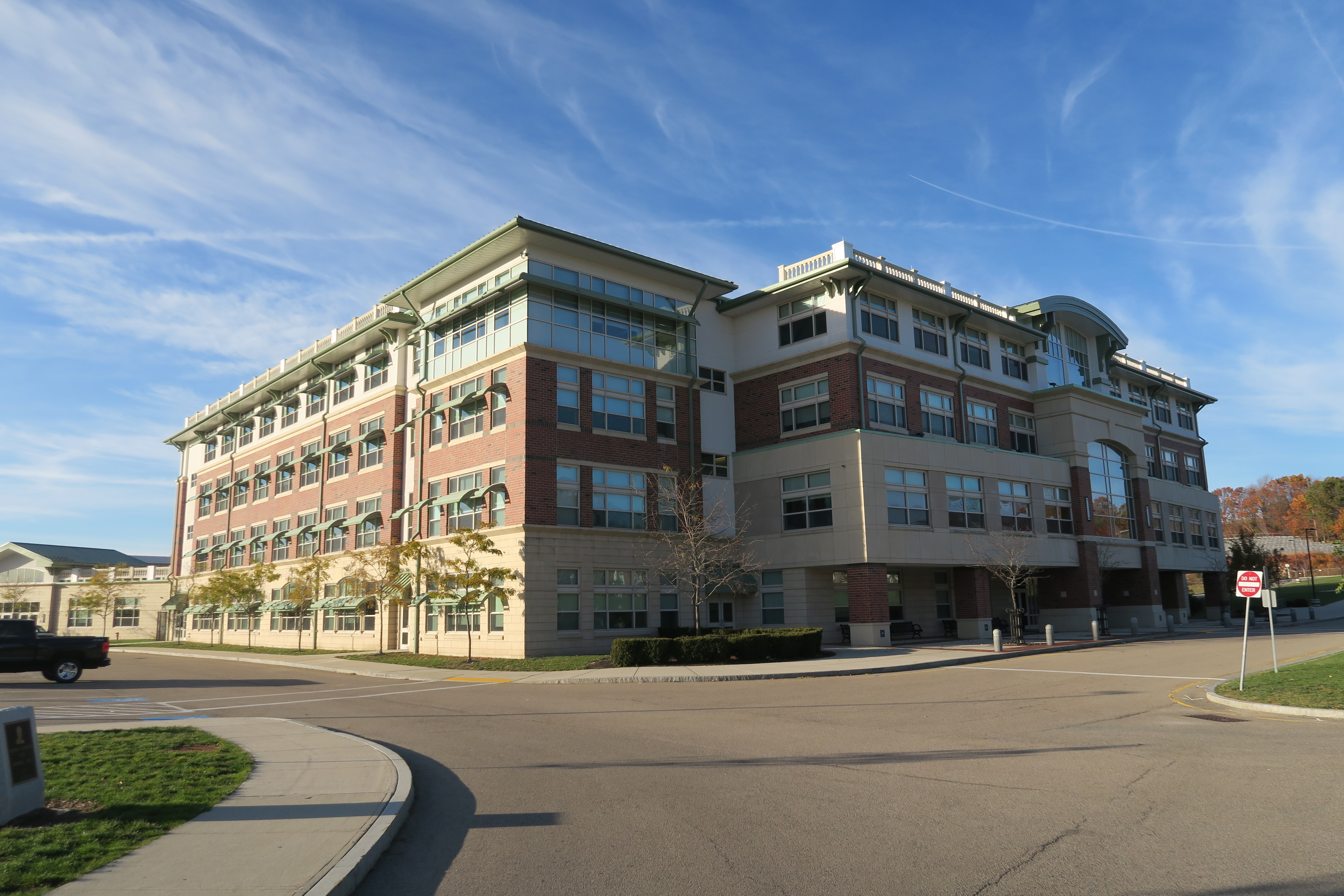

Location
- 100 Sohier Rd. Beverly, Massachusetts 01915; United States; 42°33′52″N 70°52′52″W

Information
- Type: Public High School; Open enrollment
- Motto: Be The Best Beverly
- Established: 1859; 167 years ago
- School district: Beverly Public Schools
- Superintendent: Dr. Peter Cushing
- NCES School ID: 250264000164
- Principal: Elizabeth A. Taylor
- Teaching staff: 102.35 FTE
- Grades: 9–12
- Student to teacher ratio: 12.26
- Hours in school day: 6.5
- Houses: 2
- Colors: Orange & Black
- Song: Onward and Onward for Beverly High
- Athletics conference: Northeastern Conference (NEC)
- Mascot: Panther
- Nickname: Beverly Panthers
- Rival: Salem
- Newspaper: The Ledger
- Yearbook: Beverlega
- Website: bhs.beverlyschools.org

Beverly High School is one of two four-year public high schools in Beverly, Massachusetts, United States, the other being the smaller Northshore Academy. It has an enrollment of approximately 1,300 students and is accredited by the Massachusetts Department of Education and by the New England Association of Schools and Colleges.

The staff consists of a Principal, three assistant principals, an athletic director, six Guidance Counselors and about a hundred teachers including six department heads. The school mascot is the Beverly High Panthers.

== Academics ==
BHS offers three foreign languages, French, Spanish, and German. It also offers ASL (American Sign Language). The school also offers 12 Advanced Placement courses. Over 90% of graduating seniors enroll in two or four year colleges.

== Demographics ==
According to Massachusetts Department of Elementary and Secondary Education annual statistics, for the 2019-2020 academic year, the demographic enrollment distributions for race, gender and grade level at Beverly High School are as follows:

Total number of enrolled students: 1,312
Total number of full-time equivalent educators: 91.2
Therefore, the student to teacher ratio for this school is 14.4:1

Enrollment by Race/Ethnicity (2019-2020)
Race	Enrolled Pupils*	% of District
African American	46	3.5%
Asian	31	2.4%
Hispanic	177	13.5%
Native American	1	0.1%
White	1,009	76.9%
Native Hawaiian, Pacific Islander	1	0.1%
Multi-Race, Non-Hispanic	46	3.5%
Total	1,312	100%

* Approximate number of enrolled pupils is calculated based on total number of students in district, multiplied by reported percentage, and rounded to nearest whole student.

Enrollment by gender (2019-2020)
Gender	Enrolled pupils	Percentage
Female	623	47.48%
Male	687	52.36%
Non-binary	2	0.15%
Total	1,312	100%

Enrollment by Grade
Grade	Pupils Enrolled	Percentage
9	347	26.45%
10	360	27.44%
11	309	23.55%
12	287	21.88%
SP*	9	0.69%
Total	1,312	100%

* SP = Special Education Beyond Grade 12

== Extracurricular activities ==
=== Athletics ===
Beverly High School is a member of M.I.A.A with athletes participating in the Northeastern Conference. Athletics are open to all students at Beverly High School during Fall, Winter and Spring seasons.

- Fall Sports
  - Boys Cross Country
  - Girls Cross Country
  - Football
  - Girls Volleyball
  - Field Hockey
  - Boys Soccer
  - Girls Soccer
  - Golf
  - Football Cheerleading
- Winter Sports
  - Boys Basketball
  - Girls Basketball
  - Boys Indoor Track
  - Girls Indoor Track
  - Swimming
  - Gymnastics
  - Boys Hockey
  - Girls Hockey
  - Wrestling
  - Basketball Cheerleading
- Spring Sports
  - Baseball
  - Softball
  - Boys Lacrosse
  - Girls Lacrosse
  - Boys Spring Track
  - Girls Spring Track
  - Boys Tennis
  - Girls Tennis
  - Sailing
  - Ultimate Frisbee

==== Men's Ice Hockey ====
Beverly High School men's ice hockey known as the Panthers won a division II State Championship in 2014 against.

==== Football ====
Beverly High School has played rival Salem High School on Thanksgiving since 1891, making it one of the longest high school football rivalries in the country. The 100th game in 1998 attracted over 11,000 fans to Hurd Stadium. The overall record has BHS winning 54–51–7.

In 2010, the team won the Division III State Championship by defeating heavily favored and undefeated Somerset High School by a score of 28–20. Beverly overcame a 20–7 halftime deficit, and rallied back to complete one of the biggest upsets in Massachusetts High School Playoff Football history.

In 2012, the Beverly Panthers varsity football team won the division 2A Super Bowl against Natick at Gillette Stadium, winning 28–21. This win gave them a perfect season of 13–0, the first in the high school's history.

==== Boys Basketball ====
The program has experienced a significant period of success beginning in the late 2010s. In the 2019–20 season, Beverly finished 21–3, won the MIAA Division II North championship over Belmont, and advanced to the state semifinals at TD Garden. The Panthers followed with a 13–0 record in the shortened 2020–21 season and another 21-win season in 2021–22, when the team was ranked among the Boston Globe's top 10 teams in Massachusetts. Beverly has remained competitive in subsequent seasons, qualifying for the Division 1 tournament each year before finishing 19–6 in 2025–26. That season, Beverly advanced to the state quarterfinals and finished among the top-ranked Division 1 teams in Massachusetts.

== Construction ==
In 2011, main construction of the new Beverly High School, still located at 100 Sohier Road, completed. The old building has since been demolished and landscaping and site work has been completed, including the two new turf fields that were installed. The new high school has finished being built, and has been in use for over 5 years as of 2023. In 2024, the main turf field had light fixtures and seating installed.

== Solar panels ==
Installed in 1981, Beverly High School became the first school in the country to have solar panels. These 100 kW ground mounted panels were supplanted by 83 kW of roof mounted solar panels in 2011. In 2022, the old solar panels were removed and a new solar panel array was added to the hill.

== Notable alumni ==
- Briar Blush, drag queen (dropped out)
- Kevin M. Burke, lawyer and politician
- Thomas Bussone, politician
- Allison G. Catheron, politician
- Eddy Duchin, piano player and band leader
- David Ferriero, 10th Head of the U.S. National Archives, since 2009
- C. Henry Glovsky, lawyer and politician
- Matt Hubbard, television writer, most notable for his work on 30 Rock
- Stuart Irving, professional ice hockey player
- Jack Leathersich, MLB pitcher for the Pittsburgh Pirates
- Herman A. MacDonald, politician and mayor
- Alfred Marshall, founder of Marshalls
- Angela Miller, American Idol season 12 contestant
- F. John Monahan, politician
- Henry P. Moulton, attorney
- Cornelius Murray, dentist and politician
