= Frances Alexander (politician) =

American politician

Member of the Massachusetts House of Representatives from the 6th Essex district
- In office 1983–1991
- Preceded by: F. John Monahan
- Succeeded by: James R. Henry

Personal details
- Born: June 16, 1919 Salem, Massachusetts, U.S.
- Died: May 15, 2010 (aged 90) Beverly, Massachusetts, U.S.
- Party: Democratic
- Occupation: Educator; Politician

Frances Alexander (née Flynn) was an American politician from Beverly, Massachusetts.

== Early life ==
Frances Alexander was born on June 16, 1919, in Salem, Massachusetts, to Edward and Nora Flynn. She grew up in Danvers, Massachusetts, and graduated from Holten High School in 1937. In 1942 she married Albert Alexander, an engineer from Beverly, Massachusetts. The couple moved to Beverly in 1946. The Alexanders had four children before they divorced.

Alexander worked sporadically as a secretary for General Electric for several years and then worked in one of the company's factories during World War II. After the war she worked at the Humpty Dumpty Nursery School in Beverly and later founded her own school, also in Beverly. Mrs. Alexander's School was originally located on the first floor of her home, but two years after its founding, Alexander relocated the growing daycare to a large, abandoned mansion overlooking Beverly Harbor. Alexander remained proprietor of Mrs. Alexander's School until she sold it in 2004 to a former assistant.

== Political career ==
In 1969, Alexander was part of the effort to bring kindergarten to the city's schools. Later that year she was elected to the Beverly School Committee. Alexander remained on the committee until 1976 when she became a member of the Beverly Board of Aldermen. She remained on the board for six years. In 1977 and 1979 she topped the ticket and as a result became the President of the Board of Aldermen. She was the first woman to serve in this position. In 1981, Alexander unsuccessfully challenged incumbent Mayor Peter Fortunato. She was the only female candidate for Mayor in Massachusetts that year.

In 1982, Alexander was elected to the Massachusetts House of Representatives. During her tenure in the House, Alexander worked to establish the Beverly Senior Center, bring about construction of the Veterans Memorial Bridge between Beverly and Salem, and pass domestic violence legislation. As a member of the Commerce Committee, she worked on small business legislation. After fifteen people were killed in a Beverly rooming house fire, Alexander wrote a bill to require sprinkler systems in boarding houses that accommodated six or more people. The bill passed in 1986. Alexander also worked on an unsuccessful effort to get a new North Shore Community College campus built in Beverly. In 1990, Alexander was considered one of the most likely incumbents to be defeated, however the race between her and Republican newcomer James R. Henry became close after Henry made several misstatements about his educational and professional background. Henry defeated Alexander 8,535 (51.6%) votes to 8,009 (48.4%). Alexander believed that the slow pace of the bridge project might have contributed to her defeat.

== Later life and death ==
From 1992 to 2003, Alexander was a member of the board of trustees at Endicott College. In this position she helped oversee the expansion of the college from a two-year all-girls school with 400 students to a four-year co-ed university attended by over 2,000 students. She also served on the board of directors of the North Shore Music Theatre, the Society of Saint Vincent de Paul, the Beverly Preschool, the Girdler House, and the North Shore Chamber of Commerce.

In 2004, she sold her home in Beverly and moved to Brooksby Village, a senior housing complex in Peabody, Massachusetts. On May 15, 2010, Alexander died at Beverly Hospital following a heart attack.

== See also ==
- 1985–1986 Massachusetts legislature
- 1987–1988 Massachusetts legislature
