= Jerry Parisella =

American politician

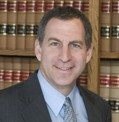

Member of the Massachusetts House of Representatives from the 6th Essex district
- In office 2011–2024
- Preceded by: Mary E. Grant
- Succeeded by: Hannah Bowen

Personal details
- Party: Democratic
- Education: New England School of Law; Emerson College
- Occupation: Journalist; Press Secretary; Lawyer; Politician

Jerald A. "Jerry" Parisella is an American politician who previously represented the 6th Essex district in the Massachusetts House of Representatives.

Parisella graduated from Emerson College in 1988 with a bachelor's degree in journalism. He worked as a reporter for the Salem Evening News from 1989 until 1991, when he became Congressman Nicholas Mavroules' press secretary.

In 1997, Parisella graduated from the New England School of Law. A year later he became an assistant city solicitor in Beverly, Massachusetts. In 2000, Parisella gave up his solicitor's job to join the law firm of Alexander & Femino. From 2006–2011, he was also an assistant city solicitor in Salem, Massachusetts.

Parisella is a lieutenant colonel in the Massachusetts National Guard, serving as a Judge Advocate General. In 2011 he deployed to Iraq with the 804th Medical Brigade. He currently serves in the 151st Regional Support Group. He formerly served in the US. Army Reserves with State Rep Harold Naughton, Jr. and State Senator John Velis

In December 2024, he resigned from the Massachusetts House of Representatives when he was sworn in as Associate Justice of the Massachusetts District Court.

== See also ==
- 2019–2020 Massachusetts legislature
- 2021–2022 Massachusetts legislature
