= Andrea Cabral =

American lawyer (born 1959)

- Official portrait, 2013

Massachusetts Secretary of Public Safety
- In office 2013–2015
- Governor: Deval Patrick
- Preceded by: Mary Elizabeth Heffernan
- Succeeded by: Daniel Bennett

Sheriff of Suffolk County, Massachusetts
- In office 2002–2013
- Preceded by: Richard J. Rouse
- Succeeded by: Steven W. Tompkins

Personal details
- Born: 1959 (age 66–67) East Providence, Rhode Island, U.S.
- Party: Democratic
- Education: Boston College (BA); Suffolk University Law School (JD)
- Occupation: Lawyer

Andrea J. Cabral (born 1959) is an American lawyer and former Massachusetts Secretary of Public Safety and Sheriff of Suffolk County, Massachusetts.

== Background ==
Cabral is a native of East Providence, Rhode Island. She is a graduate of Boston College (1981) with a Bachelor of Arts degree and Suffolk University Law School where she earned her Juris Doctor degree in 1986. Cabral began her legal career in 1986 as a staff attorney at the Suffolk County Sheriff's Department at the Charles Street Jail, working to prepare and argue motions for bail reduction for the Suffolk Superior Court. Subsequently, she served as an assistant district attorney at the Middlesex County District Attorney's Office from 1987 to 1991. From 1991 to 1993, Cabral served in the Office of the Attorney General including work in the Torts Division/Government Bureau and the Civil Rights/ Public Protection Bureau. Cabral then began work at the Suffolk County District Attorney's Office in 1993 under then District Attorney Ralph C. Martin III. From 1993 to 1994, she was director of Roxbury District Court Family Violence Project. She became chief of the Domestic Violence Unit at the Suffolk County District Attorney's Office in 1994. In 1998, Cabral was promoted to chief of District Courts and Community Prosecutions. Eisenhower Fellowships selected Andrea Cabral as a USA Eisenhower in 1997.

== Sheriff of Suffolk County ==
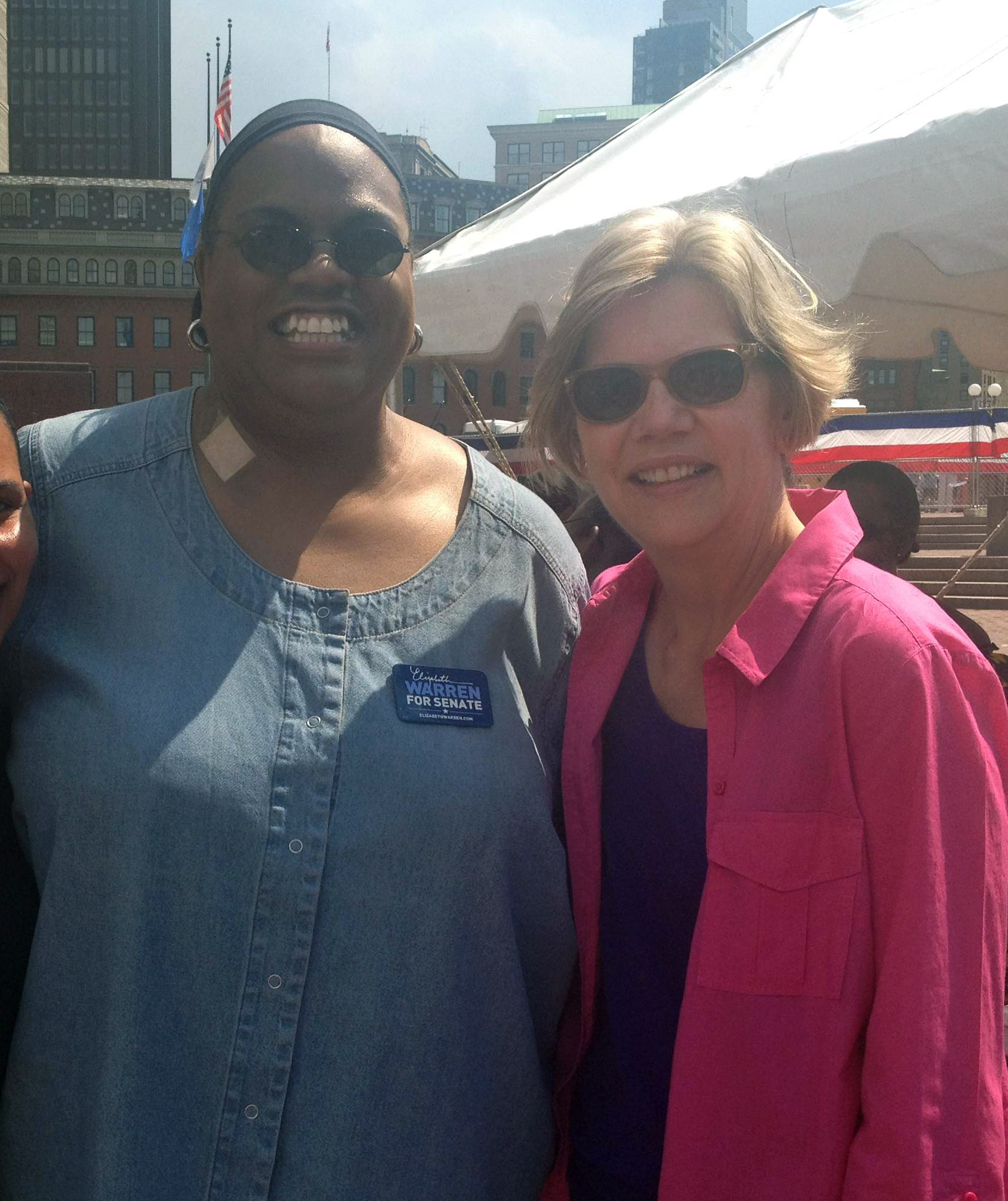
Cabral (center) with Elizabeth Warren (right) in 2012

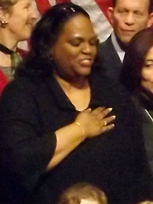
Cabral in 2013

In 2002, after the Stern Commission, headed by Donald K. Stern, called for reform in the Sheriff's Department, she was appointed sheriff by Governor Jane Swift. Cabral won election in 2004 as the Sheriff of Suffolk County, Massachusetts, and was the first female in the Commonwealth of Massachusetts history to hold the position.

As Sheriff of Suffolk County, Cabral was responsible for the operation of the House of Correction, the Suffolk County Jail, the Suffolk County Women's Resource Center, the Suffolk County Community Corrections Center and the Civil Process Division. The Suffolk County Sheriff's Department has more than 1,100 employees, being correctional officers, criminal justice professionals, caseworkers and administrative staff whose primary responsibility is upholding public safety and providing rehabilitative support for more than 2,500 offenders daily.

During the 2008 Democratic Party presidential primaries, Cabral endorsed the candidacy of Hillary Clinton.

=== Immigration issues ===
In an August 13, 2010 letter to the U.S. Bureau of Immigration and Customs Enforcement, Suffolk County Sheriff Andrea Cabral noted a "staggering lack of communication and respect" from the federal agency.

She told CNN Radio that if her concerns aren't addressed, ICE "would no longer be allowed to house federal detainees at the Suffolk County Sheriff's Department. They would have to take them to a different facility."

ICE is reviewing Cabral's letter and will offer a direct response to her concerns, said Harold Ort, a spokesman for the agency.

== Massachusetts Secretary of Public Safety ==
On December 12, 2012, she was named Massachusetts Secretary of Public Safety by Governor Deval Patrick. She later resigned as Sheriff in order to accept that post.

In September 2014 it came to light due to a news story by Fox Boston TV News that Andrea Cabral as Secretary of Public Safety had issued an advisory letter to the Massachusetts Sheriffs. This advisory letter said sheriffs departments should not turn over suspects to the Immigration service who were in violation of United States immigration law. Cabral's letter said this was because the warrants are issued by a federal administrative worker not issued by a judge. Most of the sheriffs repudiated her suggestion and one of them released a notice through Fox they would continue to comply.

On January 21, 2015, Governor Baker named Daniel Bennett as the new Secretary of the Executive Office for Public Safety and Security.

== Publications ==
- "Obtaining, Enforcing and Defending x.209A Restraining Orders in Massachusetts"
- "Same Gender Domestic Violence: Strategies for Change in Creating Courtroom Accessibility."
