= James A. Torrey =

American politician

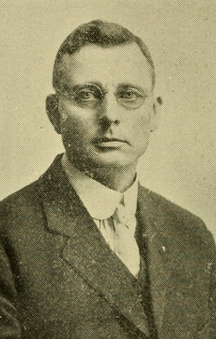

Mayor of Beverly, Massachusetts
- In office 1935–1936
- Preceded by: Paul S. Eaton
- Succeeded by: Daniel E. McLean
- In office 1931–1932
- Preceded by: Roy Patch
- Succeeded by: Paul S. Eaton

Member of the Massachusetts Senate from the 2nd Essex district
- In office 1929–1930
- Preceded by: George B. Farrington
- Succeeded by: Malcolm L. Bell

Personal details
- Born: September 27, 1868 Nova Scotia
- Died: August 14, 1954 (aged 85) Beverly, Massachusetts
- Party: Republican

James A. Torrey (September 27, 1868 – August 14, 1954) was a Canadian-born American politician who served as Mayor of Beverly, Massachusetts, and as a member of the Massachusetts General Court.

== Early life ==
Torrey was born on September 27, 1868, in Nova Scotia. He moved to the United States as a young man and settled in Beverly, Massachusetts, around 1891.

== Political career ==
Torrey was a member of the Beverly City Council for seven years and the Board of Alderman for three. From 1919 to 1928 he was a member of the Massachusetts House of Representatives. From 1929 to 1930 he represented the 2nd Essex District in the Massachusetts Senate.

In 1930, Torrey was elected Mayor of Beverly. He defeated Matthew S. Heaphy with a plurality of 261 votes in one of the closest elections in the city's history. In 1932, Torrey was defeated in his reelection bid by former Alderman Paul S. Eaton by 649 votes. Two years later, Torrey won a three-way race for mayor, defeating Eaton and Daniel E. McLean with 4185 votes to McLane's 2863 and Eaton's 2419. McLane defeated Torrey in the next election 5493 votes to 4493.

== Later life and death ==
A blacksmith by trade, Torrey also worked in auto repair, was treasurer of Cabot Welding Co. and the Lite-Rite Manufacturing Co., and a vice president and trustee of the Beverly Savings Bank. After leaving politics, Torrey continued to operate blacksmith a shop until his death on August 14, 1954, at the age of 85.

== See also ==
- 1919 Massachusetts legislature
- 1920 Massachusetts legislature
- 1921–1922 Massachusetts legislature
- 1923–1924 Massachusetts legislature
- 1925–1926 Massachusetts legislature
- 1927–1928 Massachusetts legislature
- 1929–1930 Massachusetts legislature
