= Parker S. Davis =

American politician

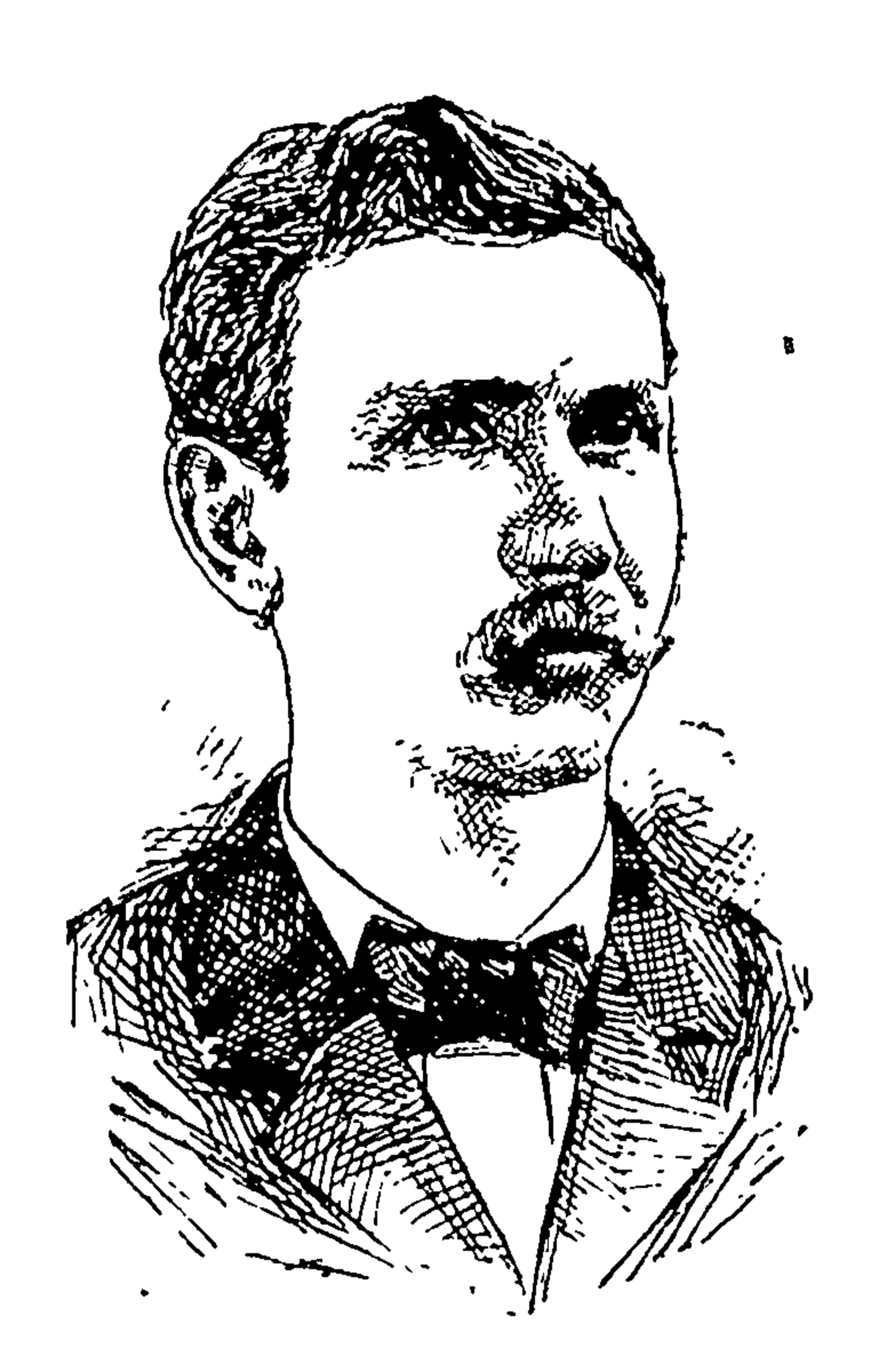
- Davis c. 1902

Member of the Massachusetts House of Representatives for the 20th Essex District
- In office 1910–1910
- Preceded by: Joseph A. Wallis
- Succeeded by: ^{1}

Mayor of Beverly, Massachusetts
- In office 1903–1904
- Preceded by: Samuel Cole
- Succeeded by: Joseph A. Wallis

Personal details
- Born: January 4, 1863 East Boston
- Died: December 18, 1955 (aged 92) Beverly, Massachusetts
- Party: Republican
- Education: Comer's Commercial College
- Occupation: Shoe operator Real estate

Parker S. Davis (January 4, 1863 – December 18, 1955) was an American politician who served as Mayor of Beverly, Massachusetts, and was a member of the Massachusetts House of Representatives.

== Early life ==
Davis was born on January 4, 1863, in East Boston. He attended school in Beverly and graduated from Comer's Commercial College of Boston in 1881.

== Political career ==
In 1897, Davis was a member of the Beverly common council. From 1898 to 1900 he was a member of the board of aldermen, first as the member from ward 1 (1898 to 1899), then as an at-large member (1900). From 1903 to 1904 he was Mayor of Beverly. In 1910, he represented the 20th Essex District in the Massachusetts House of Representatives. As a member of the House, Davis introduced a bill to reduced the legal weight for a loaf of bread from 32 ounces to 28 ounces.

== Business career ==
A shoe operator by trade, Davis later became a real estate dealer who specialized in house lots. He was also an incorporator and trustee of the Beverly Savings Bank.

== Death ==
Cole died on December 18, 1955, at the age of 92.

== Note ==
1. The 20th Essex District sent two representatives to the Massachusetts House of Representatives. In 1911, Herman A. MacDonald and John L. Saltonstall Sr. succeeded Davis and A. Preston Chase.
