= James R. Henry (politician) =

American politician

Member of the Massachusetts House of Representatives from the 6th Essex district
- In office 1991–1993
- Preceded by: Frances Alexander
- Succeeded by: Michael P. Cahill

Personal details
- Born: December 19, 1963 (age 62) Los Angeles
- Party: Republican
- Education: George Washington University; Norwich University
- Occupation: Bookkeeper; State Representative

James R. Henry is an American politician who represented the 6th Essex District in the Massachusetts House of Representatives from 1991 to 1993.

== Early life ==
Henry was born on December 19, 1963, in Los Angeles. He lived in Connecticut and Washington, D.C., before moving to Beverly, Massachusetts, in 1989. He graduated from George Washington University and Norwich University and attended Northeastern University and UMass Boston. While at George Washington, Henry was the chairman of the George Washington University College Republicans.

== Political career ==
In 1990, Henry challenged incumbent Frances Alexander for the 6th Essex District seat in the Massachusetts House of Representatives. Alexander was considered one of the most likely incumbents to be defeated, however the race became close after Henry made several misstatements about his educational and professional background, which included claiming he was an accountant when he really was a bookkeeper. Henry defeated Alexander 8,535 (51.6%) votes to 8,009 (48.4%).

In 1992, Henry was the only incumbent Republican to face a primary challenger. He defeated Sumner C. Roseman 1,395 votes (74.4%) to 476 (25.4%). He lost to Democrat Michael P. Cahill in the general election 12,750 votes (65.5%) to 6,706 (34.5%).
