= Massachusetts House of Representatives' 6th Essex district =

American legislative district

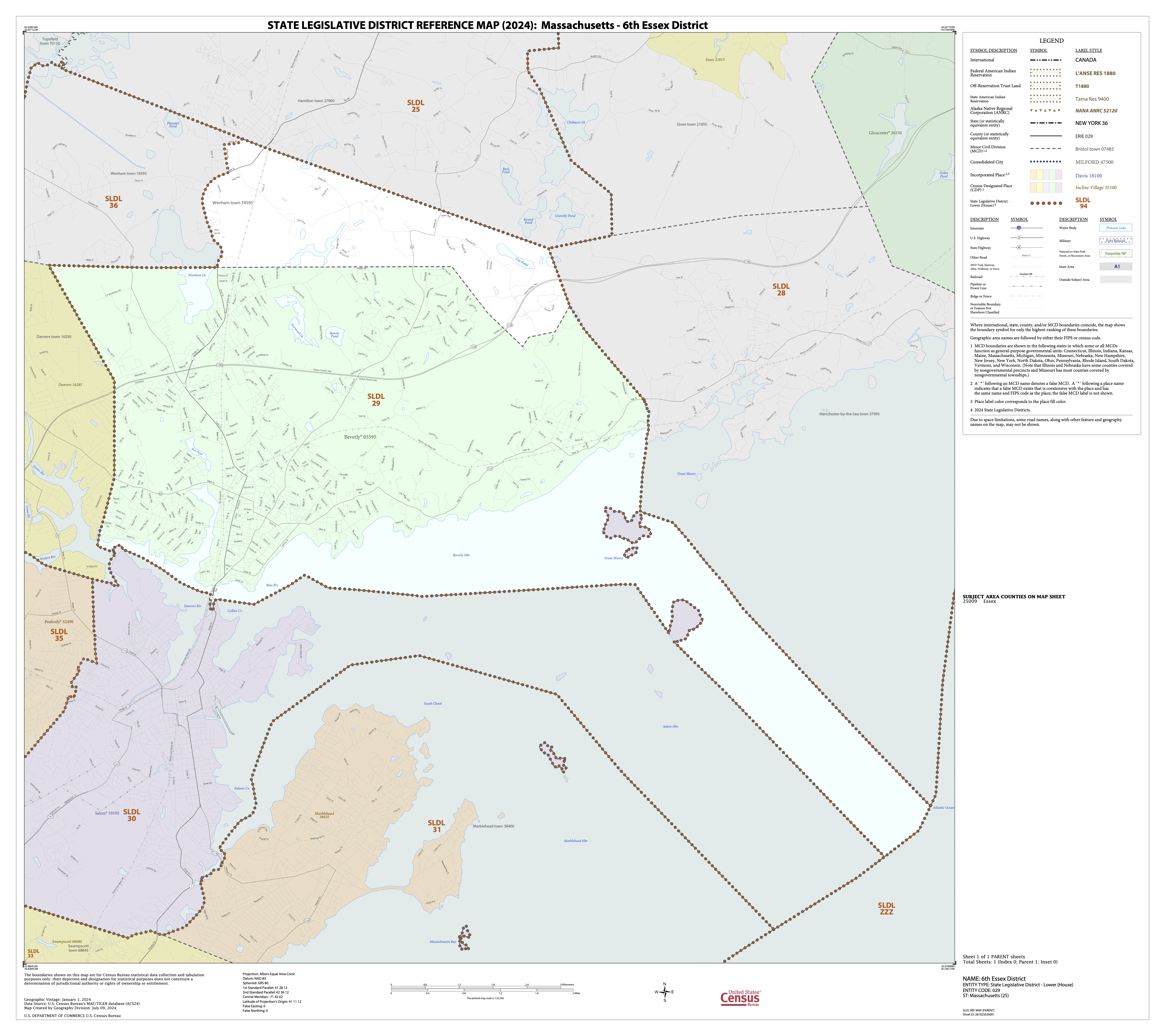
Map of Massachusetts House of Representatives' 6th Essex district, based on the 2020 United States census.

Massachusetts House of Representatives' 6th Essex district is one of 160 districts in the lower house of the Massachusetts General Court. It covers the city of Beverly and part of the town of Wenham in Essex County. Democrat Hannah Bowen of Beverly has represented the district since a May 2025 special election.

The current district geographic boundary overlaps with that of the Massachusetts Senate's 2nd Essex district.

== Representatives ==
- Mark F. Edmonds, circa 1858
- Edwin B. George, circa 1859
- Albert S. Manning, circa 1888
- Michael F. Sullivan, circa 1888
- Michael H. Jordan, circa 1920
- John Cornelius Bresnahan, circa 1951
- Joseph T. Conley, circa 1951
- John E. Murphy Jr., circa 1975
- F. John Monahan
- Frances Alexander
- James R. Henry
- Michael P. Cahill
- Mary E. Grant, 2003–2011
- Jerald A. Parisella, 2011–2024
- Hannah Bowen, 2025–present

== Former locales ==
The district previously covered:

- Newbury, circa 1872
- Newburyport, circa 1872

== See also ==
- List of Massachusetts House of Representatives elections
- Other Essex County districts of the Massachusetts House of Representatives: 1st, 2nd, 3rd, 4th, 5th, 7th, 8th, 9th, 10th, 11th, 12th, 13th, 14th, 15th, 16th, 17th, 18th
- Essex County districts of the Massachusett Senate: 1st, 2nd, 3rd; 1st Essex and Middlesex; 2nd Essex and Middlesex
- List of Massachusetts General Courts
- List of former districts of the Massachusetts House of Representatives

== Images ==
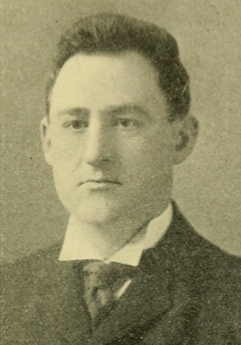
William Kelleher

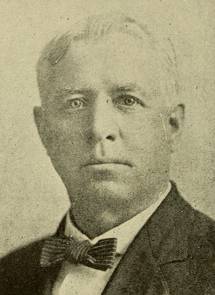
Michael Jordan

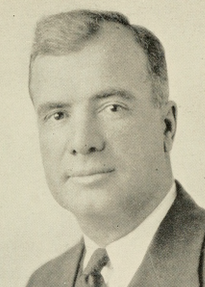
James Donnelly

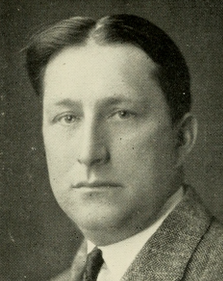
Thomas Lane

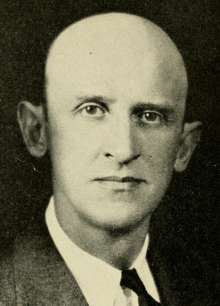
William Wall

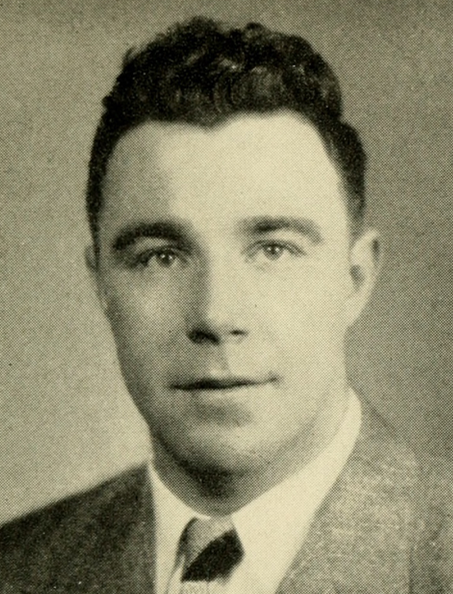
John Cornelius Bresnahan

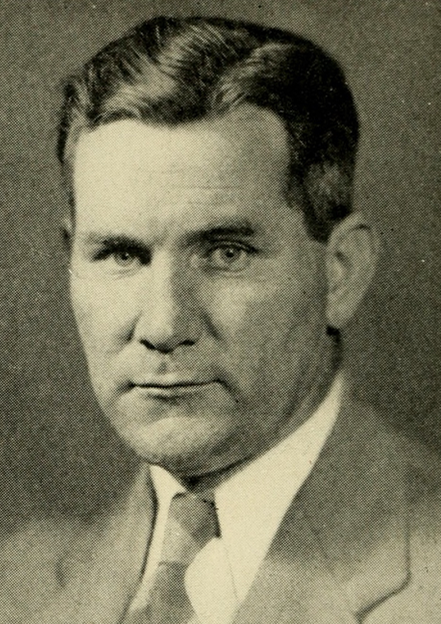
Joseph Conley

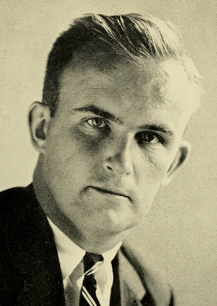
Michael Harrington

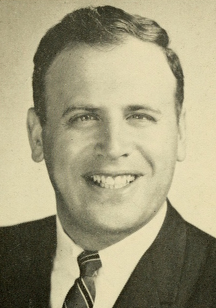
Samuel Zoll

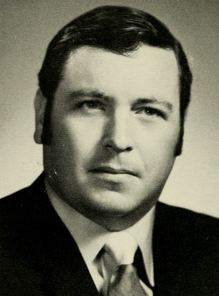
John Murphy

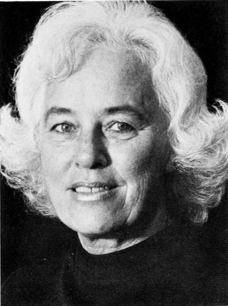
Frances Alexander

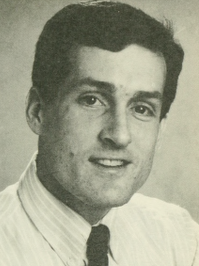
Michael Cahill

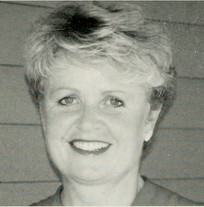
Mary Grant
