= Thomas Bussone =

American politician

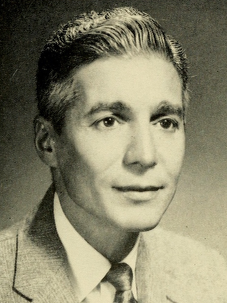
- Bussone in 1967

Member of the Massachusetts House of Representatives from the 4th Essex district
- In office 1967–1975
- Preceded by: Abraham L. Cohn
- Succeeded by: Kevin M. Burke

Personal details
- Born: September 20, 1912 Lynn, Massachusetts
- Died: December 7, 2002 (aged 90) Beverly, Massachusetts
- Party: Republican

Thomas Bussone (1912-2002) was an American politician who served as a member of the Massachusetts House of Representatives from 1967 to 1975.

== Early life ==
Bussone was born on September 20, 1912, in Lynn, Massachusetts. He graduated from Beverly High School in Beverly, Massachusetts, and attended Suffolk University for two years. Prior to becoming a state representative, Bussone worked at Rantoul Pharmacy in Beverly for over a decade.

== Political career ==
From 1960 to 1963, Bussone represented Ward 3 on the Beverly board of alderman. In 1966, he was elected to the 4th Essex district seat in the Massachusetts House of Representatives on a platform of delivering efficient constituent services and lowering the cost of government. During his tenure in the House, Bussone fought to keep the Beverly Depot commuter rail station open and to open a Registry of Motor Vehicles division in Beverly. He was strongly pro-life and held moderate views on civil and women's rights. Bussone was defeated for reelection in 1974 by Democrat Kevin M. Burke. He blamed his loss on anti-Republican backlash caused by the Watergate scandal.

After his defeat, Bussone worked in the office of state senator William L. Saltonstall.

== Death ==
Bussone died on December 7, 2002, in Beverly.
