= Samuel Cole (politician) =

American politician

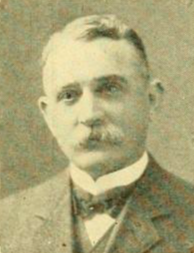

Member of the Massachusetts Governor's Council for the 5th District
- In office 1908–1909
- Preceded by: Lewis H. Barlett
- Succeeded by: William H. Gove

Member of the Massachusetts Senate for the 2nd Essex District
- In office 1903–1904
- Preceded by: J. Frank Porter
- Succeeded by: William D. Chapple

Mayor of Beverly, Massachusetts
- In office 1901–1902
- Preceded by: Benjamin D. Webber
- Succeeded by: Parker S. Davis

Personal details
- Born: December 15, 1856 Rutland, Vermont
- Died: July 6, 1935 (aged 78) Beverly, Massachusetts
- Party: Republican
- Occupation: Market gardener

Samuel Cole (December 15, 1856 – July 6, 1935) was an American politician who served as mayor of Beverly, Massachusetts, and was a member of the Massachusetts General Court and the Massachusetts Governor's Council.

== Early life ==
Cole was born on December 15, 1856, in Rutland, Vermont. His family moved to Beverly during his youth. Outside of politics, Cole worked as a market gardner.

== Political career ==
From 1882 to 1894 Cole was a member of the Beverly School Committee. From 1895 to 1896 he served as president of the city's common council. From 1897 to 1899 he was a member of the Massachusetts House of Representatives. From 1901 to 1902 he was Mayor of Beverly. From 1903 to 1904 he represented the Second Essex District in the Massachusetts Senate. From 1908 to 1909 he represented the 5th District on the Massachusetts Governor's Council.

== Death ==
Cole died on July 6, 1935.
