= Hannah Bowen =

American politician

Member of the Massachusetts House of Representatives from the 6th Essex district
- Incumbent
- Assumed office May 21, 2025
- Preceded by: Jerry Parisella

Personal details
- Party: Democratic
- Education: Yale College (BA); Harvard Kennedy School (MPA)

Hannah Bowen is an American politician who serves as a member of the Massachusetts House of Representatives for the 6th Essex district. A member of the Democratic Party, Bowen was previously an at-large city councilor in Beverly. She was first elected in a special election in 2025.

== Committee Assignments ==
For the 2025-26 Session, Bowen sits on the following committees in the House:

- Joint Committee on Housing
- Joint Committee on Labor and Workforce Development
- Joint Committee on State Administration and Regulatory Oversight
- Joint Committee on Transportation
