= Kempt, Nova Scotia =

Community in Nova Scotia, Canada

Coordinates: 44°25′40.43″N 65°6′59.95″W

Kempt in Nova Scotia

Kempt is a community in the Canadian province of Nova Scotia, located in the Region of Queens Municipality. Kempt is named after General Sir James Kempt, who served as Lieutenant Governor of Nova Scotia from 1820 to 1828.
