= Michael P. Cahill =

American politician (born 1961)

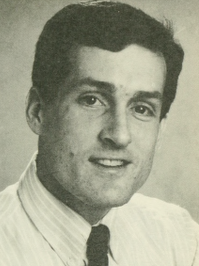
- Portrait of Michael P. Cahill

34th Mayor of Beverly, Massachusetts
- Incumbent
- Assumed office 2014
- Preceded by: William F. Scanlon Jr.

Member of the Massachusetts House of Representatives from the 6th Essex district
- In office 1993–2003
- Preceded by: James R. Henry
- Succeeded by: Mary E. Grant

Personal details
- Born: December 12, 1961 (age 64) Beverly, Massachusetts
- Party: Democratic
- Education: Middlebury College; Suffolk University Law School
- Occupation: Teacher; Politician

Michael P. Cahill (born December 12, 1961, in Beverly, Massachusetts) is an American politician who is the 34th and current mayor of Beverly, Massachusetts. He previously represented the 6th Essex district in the Massachusetts House of Representatives from 1993 to 2003. He was a candidate for Treasurer and Receiver-General of Massachusetts in 2002, finishing fourth in the Democratic primary.

After leaving the General Court, Cahill was elected to the Beverly City Council and served as Council President. He was a candidate for Mayor of Beverly in 2011, but lost to incumbent William F. Scanlon Jr. In 2013, Scanlon retired and Cahill ran again. He defeated city councilor Wes Slate by 5,752 votes to 4,563.
