= Joseph A. Wallis =

American politician

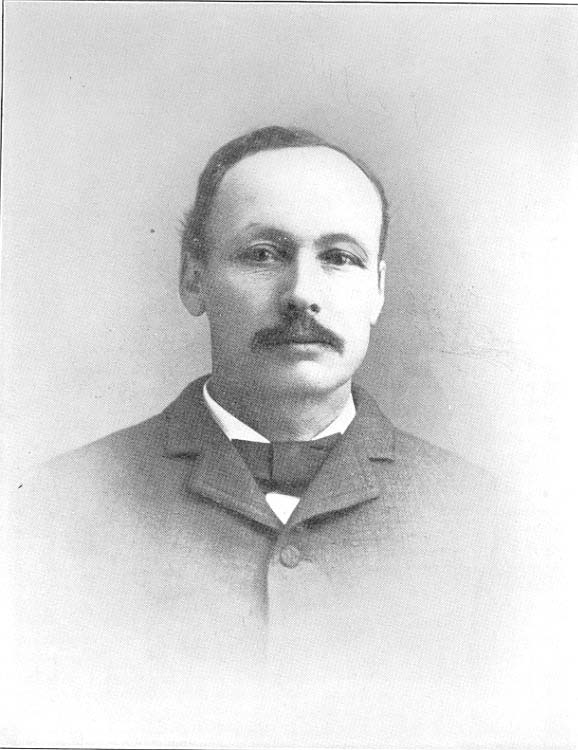

Member of the Massachusetts House of Representatives for the 20th Essex District
- In office 1908–1909
- Preceded by: ^{1}
- Succeeded by: Parker S. Davis

Mayor of Beverly, Massachusetts
- In office 1905–1906
- Preceded by: Parker S. Davis
- Succeeded by: S. Harvey Dow

Personal details
- Born: December 12, 1837 Beverly, Massachusetts
- Died: May 14, 1917 (aged 79) Beverly, Massachusetts
- Party: Republican
- Occupation: Shoe manufacturer

Joseph A. Wallis (December 12, 1837 – May 14, 1917) was an American politician who served as Mayor of Beverly, Massachusetts.

== Early life ==
Wallis was born on December 12, 1837, in Beverly. At the age of 13, he began learning the shoemaking trade from his father. He spent several winters fishing at the Grand Banks of Newfoundland before going into shoe manufacturing full-time. During the American Civil War, Wallis enlisted with an unattached artillery company. The company spent a year at a fort in Gloucester, Massachusetts, but did not see any combat before the war ended.

== Business career ==
In 1867, Wallis and two business partners opened a shoe factory under the firm name Wallis, Kilham & Bray in Beverly. He retired from the business in 1900. He was also a longtime trustee and vice president of the Beverly Savings Bank.

== Political career ==
From 1885 to 1886, Wallis was a member of the Beverly board of selectmen. In 1902 he served on the board of aldermen. From 1905 to 1906 he was Mayor of Beverly. From 1908 to 1909 he represented the 20th Essex District in the Massachusetts House of Representatives.

== Later life and death ==
On October 3, 1916, Wallis was thrown from an automobile during a collision. He was not seriously injured.

Wallis died on May 14, 1917, following several months of illness.

== Note ==
1. The 20th Essex District sent two representatives to the Massachusetts House of Representatives. In 1908, Wallis and William R. Brooks succeeded Melvin B. Putnam and Albert Vittum.
