= Time 100 =

Annual list of influential people

- Awarded for: Influence
- Date: Annually since 2004
- Presented by: Time magazine
- Website: time.com/100-most-influential-people

The Time 100 is a list of the 100 most influential people in the world as identified by Time, an American news magazine. First published in 1999 as the result of a debate among American academics, politicians, and journalists, the list is now a highly publicized annual event. It is generally considered an honor to be included on the list, but, much like the magazine's Person of the Year, Time makes it clear that entrants are recognized for changing the world, regardless of the consequences of their actions. The final list of influential individuals is exclusively chosen by Time editors, with nominations coming from the Time 100 alumni and the magazine's international writing staff. Only the winner of the Reader's Poll, conducted days before the official list is revealed, is chosen by the general public. The corresponding commemorative gala is held annually in Manhattan, and has emerged as one of the world's most celebrated galas as well as high fashion events.

In 2019, Time began publishing the Time 100 Next list, which "spotlights 100 rising stars who are shaping the future of business, entertainment, sports, politics, science, health and more".

== Selection criteria ==
In 2000, Time's editors identified "three rather distinct qualities" when choosing people to be listed. Time's editor-at-large Michael Elliott wrote:

First there were those who came to their status by means of a very public possession of power. President George W. Bush is the pre-eminent example. Others, though they are rarely heard from in public, nonetheless have a real influence on the great events of our time. Think of Ali Husaini Sistani, the Grand Ayatullah [sic] of Iraq's Shi'ites, who in effect has a veto on plans to transfer power from those who occupy his country to its people. Still others affect our lives through their moral example. Consider Nelson Mandela's forgiveness of his captors and his willingness to walk away from the South African presidency after a single term.

For the 2007 list, managing editor Richard Stengel clarified that the Time 100 focused on the most influential people rather than the hottest, most popular, or most powerful people. He said:

Influence is hard to measure, and what we look for is people whose ideas, whose example, whose talent, whose discoveries transform the world we live in. Influence is less about the hard power of force than the soft power of ideas and example. Yes, there are Presidents and dictators who can change the world through fiat, but we're more interested in innovators like Monty Jones, the Sierra Leone scientist who has developed a strain of rice that can save African agriculture. Or heroes like the great chess master Garry Kasparov, who is leading the lonely fight for greater democracy in Russia. Or Academy Award-winning actor George Clooney who has leveraged his celebrity to bring attention to the tragedy in Darfur.

== History ==
=== 2000s ===
From 2005 to 2008, Time magazine awarded one of Darko Mladenovic's Ray crystal sculptures to each Time 100 honoree. These sculptures were produced by Swarovski.

In 2009, the winner of the online poll was 4chan founder Christopher Poole, who received 16,794,368 votes. Time claimed that their technical team "did detect and extinguish several attempts to hack the vote". However, it was shown weeks before the poll ended that the results had been heavily influenced by hackers. The first letters of the top 21 names spell out "marblecake also the game". Marblecake was an obscene 4chan meme, and #marblecake was the name of the Internet Relay Chat channel used for communication by some of the participants in rigging the poll.

=== 2010s ===
In its online presentation, Time introduced the 2010 list as follows: "In our annual Time 100 issue, we name the people who most affect our world". The overall list was organized with four main sub-lists: Leaders, Heroes, Artists, and Thinkers. Oprah Winfrey continued a streak that began in 2004, having been included on every Time 100 list, and was one of 31 women on the list. While 2012 saw a break in Oprah's streak, she would be a finalist four more times during the decade and returned to the list in 2018. The 2010 list included many expected names and some surprises such as Scott Brown, who HuffPost described as a premature selection at that point in his career.

The 2010 list included 10 Indians, but according to a local news station in India, Time faced criticism when they excluded Bollywood actor Shah Rukh Khan from the list, even though he was supposedly "in the race". According to Rob Cain of Forbes, "Khan is the biggest and most revered figure [in India]", and Khan's fan following is one of the largest in Bollywood.

The announcement of the list was celebrated by a black tie gala at the Time Warner Center in New York City on May 4, 2010. Time readers contributed to the selection through an online vote of over 200 finalists.

Another black tie event was held in New York City on April 26, 2011. The honorees were joined by A-list celebrities at the Jazz at Lincoln Center for the event. Time readers contributed to the selection through an online vote of over 200 finalists. The list included political leaders, particularly U.S. president Barack Obama and German chancellor Angela Merkel, as well as "newcomers" to the global press. Numerous figures representing the Arab Spring in the Middle East, including rebels, political leaders, and news correspondents, were included. Media figures unrelated to the Arab Spring were also listed. Additionally, Prince William and Catherine Middleton were part of the list during the week before their wedding. The list also included Katsunobu Sakurai, the mayor of Minamisōma, Fukushima, which was the city most affected by the 2011 Tōhoku earthquake and tsunami.

Revealed on April 24, 2014, the 2014 list featured Beyoncé on the U.S. cover and Robert Redford, Jason Collins, and Mary Barra on international covers. The list included 41 women, the most in the list's history. The gala was held on April 29, 2014, in New York City.

Time managing editor Nancy Gibbs commented:

The Time 100 is a list of the world's most influential men and women, not its most powerful, though those are not mutually exclusive terms. Power, as we've seen this year, can be crude and implacable, from Vladimir Putin's mugging of Crimea to North Korean dictator Kim Jong Un's summary execution of his uncle and mentor Jang Song-thaek. Those men made our list, but they are the outliers, and not just because we generally seek to celebrate the best work of the human spirit. The vast majority of this year's roster reveals that while power is certain, influence is subtle. Power is a tool, influence is a skill; one is a fist, the other a fingertip. You don't lead by hitting people over the head, Dwight Eisenhower used to say. That's "assault, not leadership." ... To assemble the list, we rely on our journalists around the world and our Time 100 alumni (many of whom are as influential as ever). ... If there is a common theme in many of the tributes, it's the eagerness to see what some engineer, actor, leader or athlete will do next. As much as this exercise chronicles the achievements of the past year, we also focus on figures whose influence is likely to grow, so we can look around the corner to see what is coming.

— Nancy Gibbs, "The Ties That Bind the 100"

At age 14, English-Spanish born actress Millie Bobby Brown became the youngest person to be listed on the 2018 list, when Stranger Things was in its third season. The 2018 list also included two Israelis: entrepreneur and WeWork founder Adam Neumann; and actress and model Gal Gadot.

In the 2019 list, Time chose authors to write the honorees' blurbs. Some of the pairings include Gal Gadot writing about Dwayne Johnson, Shawn Mendes writing about Taylor Swift, Shonda Rhimes writing about Sandra Oh, Ava DuVernay writing about Gayle King, and Beyoncé writing about Michelle Obama.

=== 2020s ===
The 2020 list included Indian actor Ayushmann Khurrana, rapper Megan Thee Stallion, comedian Phoebe Waller-Bridge, tennis champion Naomi Osaka (her second time being included), F1 driver Lewis Hamilton, attorney Nury Turkel, American football player Patrick Mahomes, and environmental justice advocate Cecilia Martinez.

On September 15, Time revealed the 2021 list, distributed into the categories Icons, Pioneers, Titans, Artists, Leaders and Innovators. Each category has a highlighted section of personalities being featured on the Time magazine cover, naming Prince Harry and Meghan Markle as Icons, Billie Eilish as Pioneer, Simone Biles as Titan, Kate Winslet as Artist, Ngozi Okonjo-Iweala as Leader and Jensen Huang as Innovator. Furthermore, Time held a readers poll prior to the reveal of the editors list, asking whether certain personalities should be included in that year's annual list. Nearly 1.8 million votes were cast, with Britney Spears claiming the top spot while also being featured as an Icon.

Editor-in-chief Edward Felsenthal commented on the current working circumstances at Time and the effects of the ongoing COVID-19 pandemic on the annual gala:

For the second year in a row, Time journalists assembled this project working apart, across time zones and continents. It was overseen for the fifth year by Dan Macsai, editorial director of the Time100, working with Ng, as well as Jennifer Duggan, Merrill Fabry, Lucy Feldman, Cate Matthews, Nadia Suleman and designer Katie Kalupson. Though COVID-19 prevented us from hosting our annual gala (back next year!), we are bringing the list to life once again through a Time100 TV special (Monday, Sept. 20, at 10 p.m. E.T. on ABC).

— Edward Felsenthal, "How We Chose the 2021 Time100"

The 2023 list included King Charles III, Olena Zelenska, Doja Cat, Patrick Mahomes, and Sam Altman.

The 2024 list included Dua Lipa, Dev Patel, 21 Savage, Jenny Holzer, and Lauren Blauvelt.

The 2025 list included Muhammad Yunus, Ahmed al-Sharaa, Yoshiki, Serena Williams, Mark Zuckerberg, Elon Musk, and Snoop Dogg.

The 2026 list included Tarique Rahman, Pope Leo XIV, Luke Combs, Jennie, Zoe Saldaña, Nikki Glaser, Alysa Liu, Balendra Shah, and Reid Wiseman.

== Multiple appearances ==
Each category is given equal weight every year, but some people make repeat appearances over time.

The following list includes individuals who have appeared at least three times. The order is based on the number of times each person has been listed in Time 100. Those who are tied are listed alphabetically. Some individuals, such as Nelson Mandela, have also been listed in the one-off Time's list of "The Most Important People of the 20th Century".

=== Listed six times or more ===
Xi Jinping
Listed fourteen times: 2026, 2022, 2021, 2020, 2019, 2018, 2017, 2016, 2015, 2014, 2013, 2012, 2011, and 2009
(Finalist in 2023)

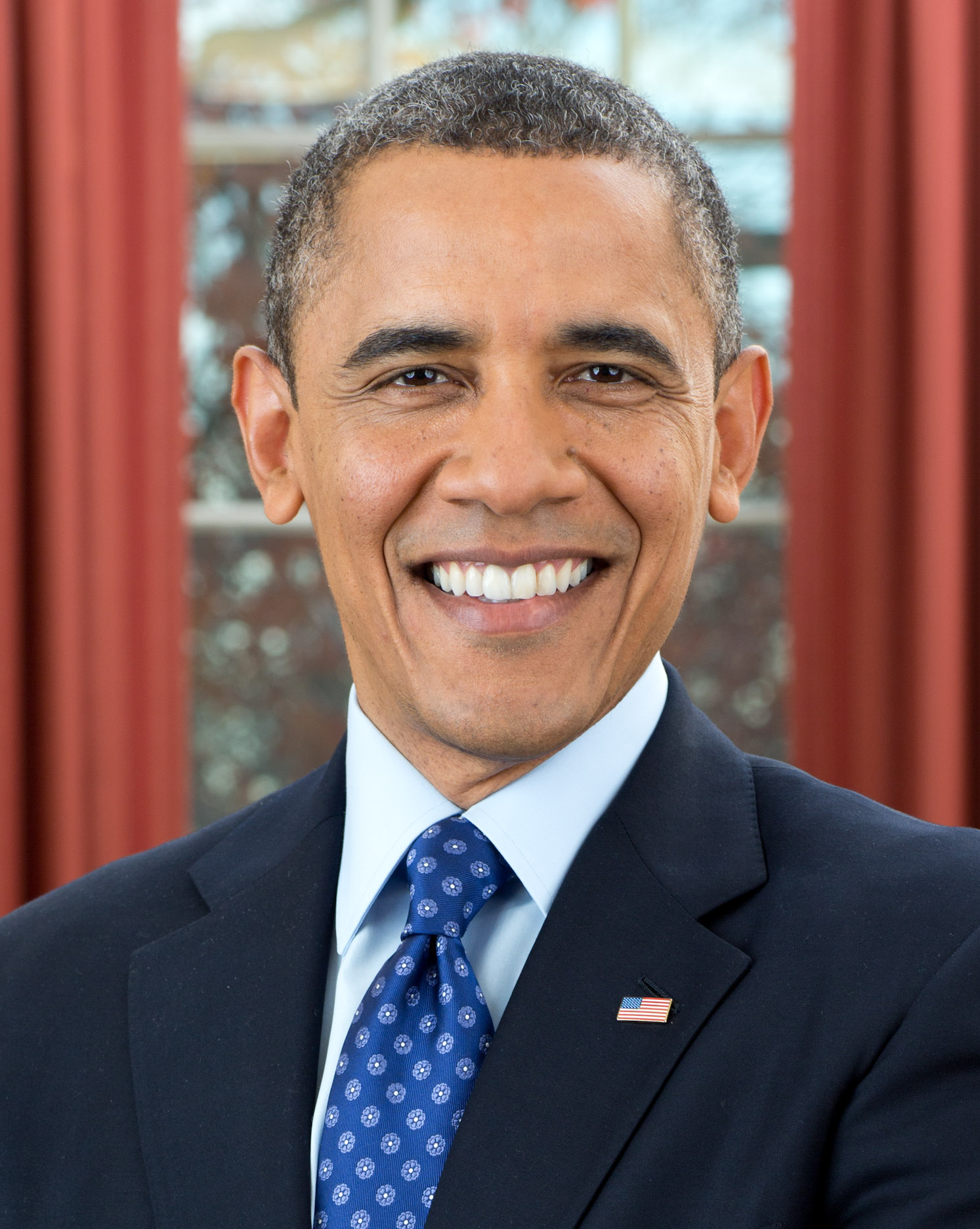
Barack Obama
Listed eleven times: 2016, 2015, 2014, 2013, 2012, 2011, 2010, 2009, 2008, 2007, and 2005
(Finalist in 2018)

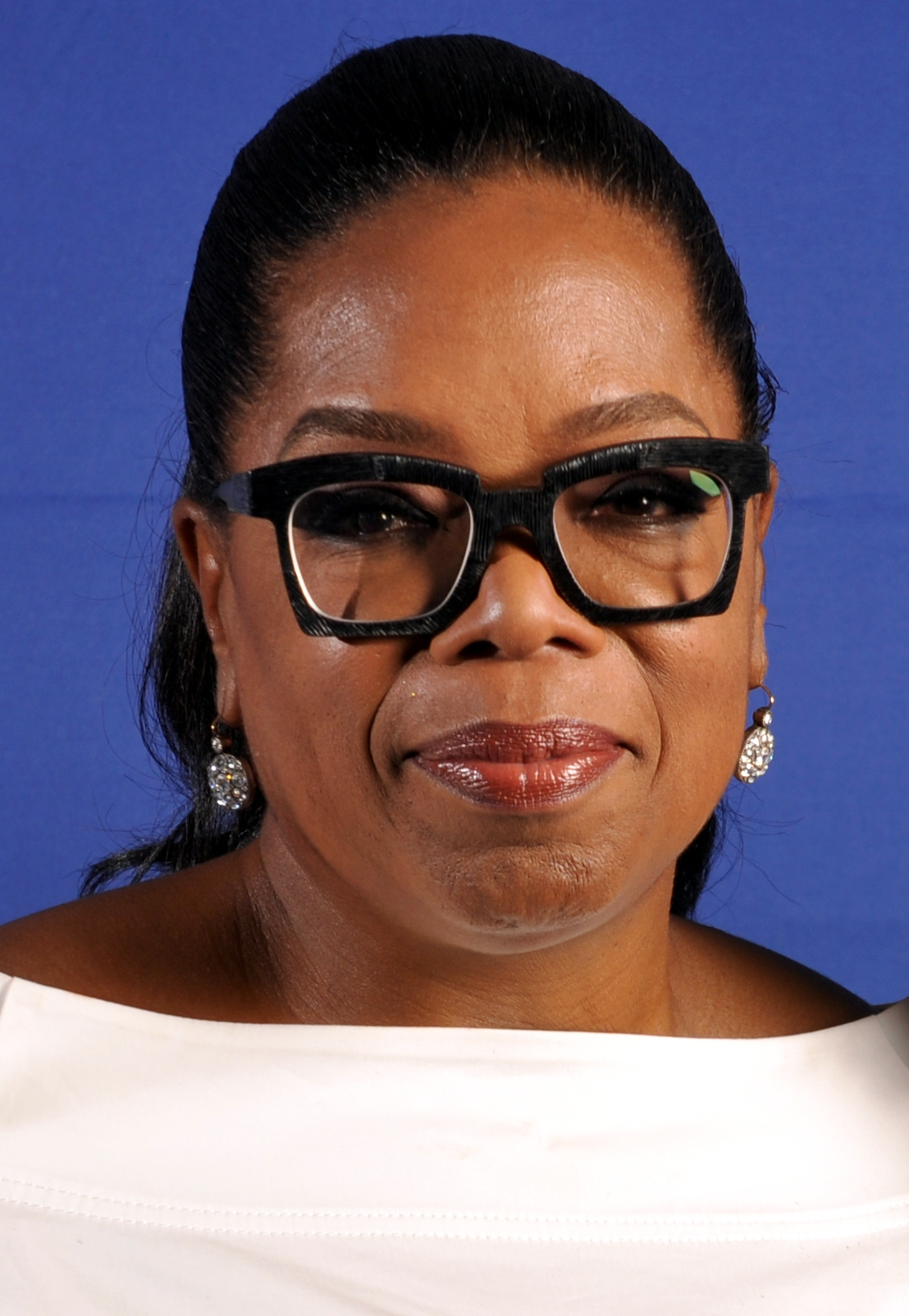
Oprah Winfrey
Listed eleven times: 2022, 2018, 2011, 2010, 2009, 2008, 2007, 2006, 2005, 2004, and the 20th century
(Finalist in 2023, 2021, 2020, 2019, 2017, 2015, and 2012)

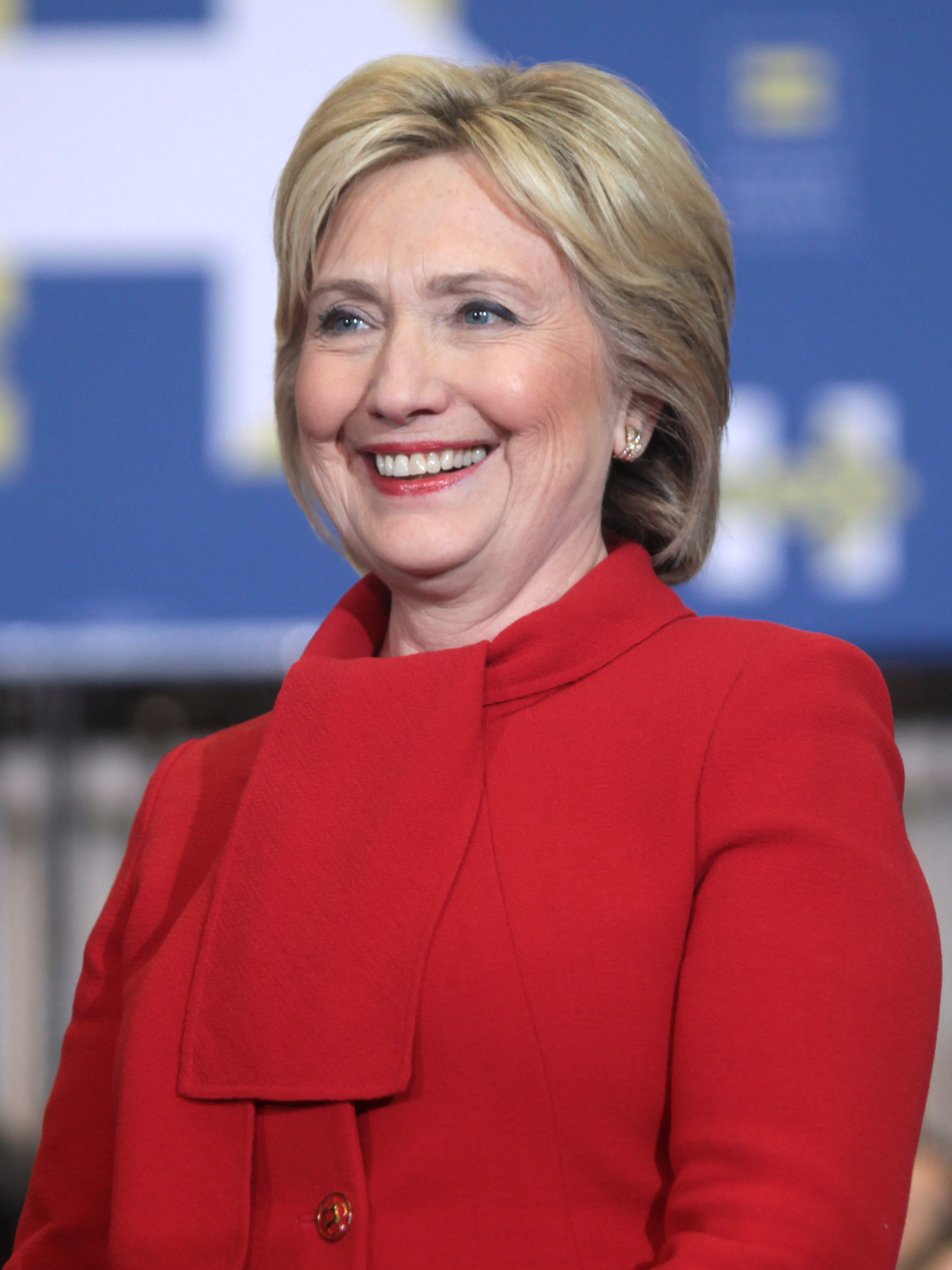
Hillary Clinton
Listed ten times: 2016, 2015, 2014, 2012, 2011, 2009, 2008, 2007, 2006, and 2004
(Finalist in 2013 and 2010)

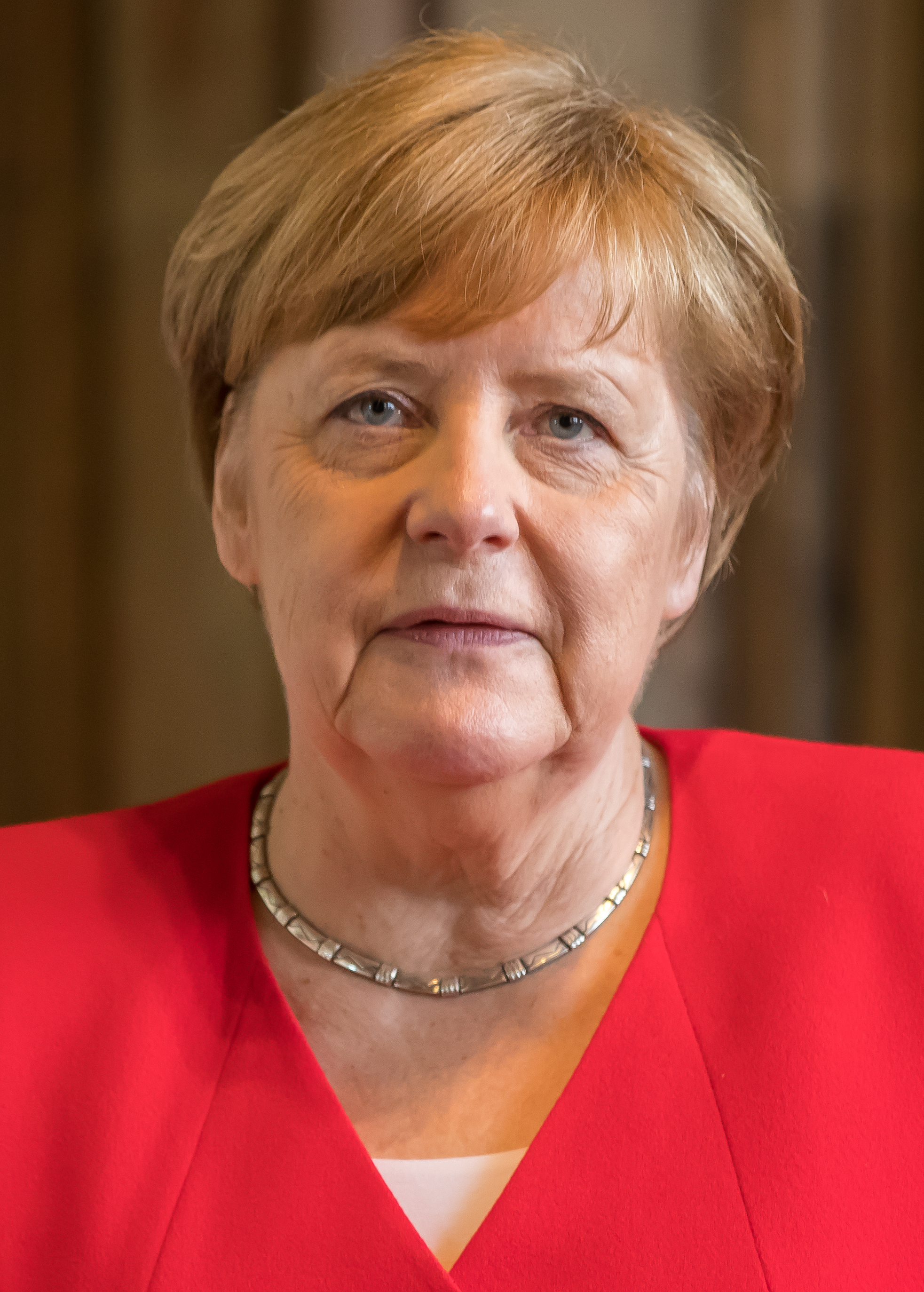
Angela Merkel
Listed nine times: 2020, 2016, 2015, 2014, 2012, 2011, 2009, 2007, and 2006
(Finalist in 2021, 2019, 2018, 2017, 2013, 2010, and 2008)

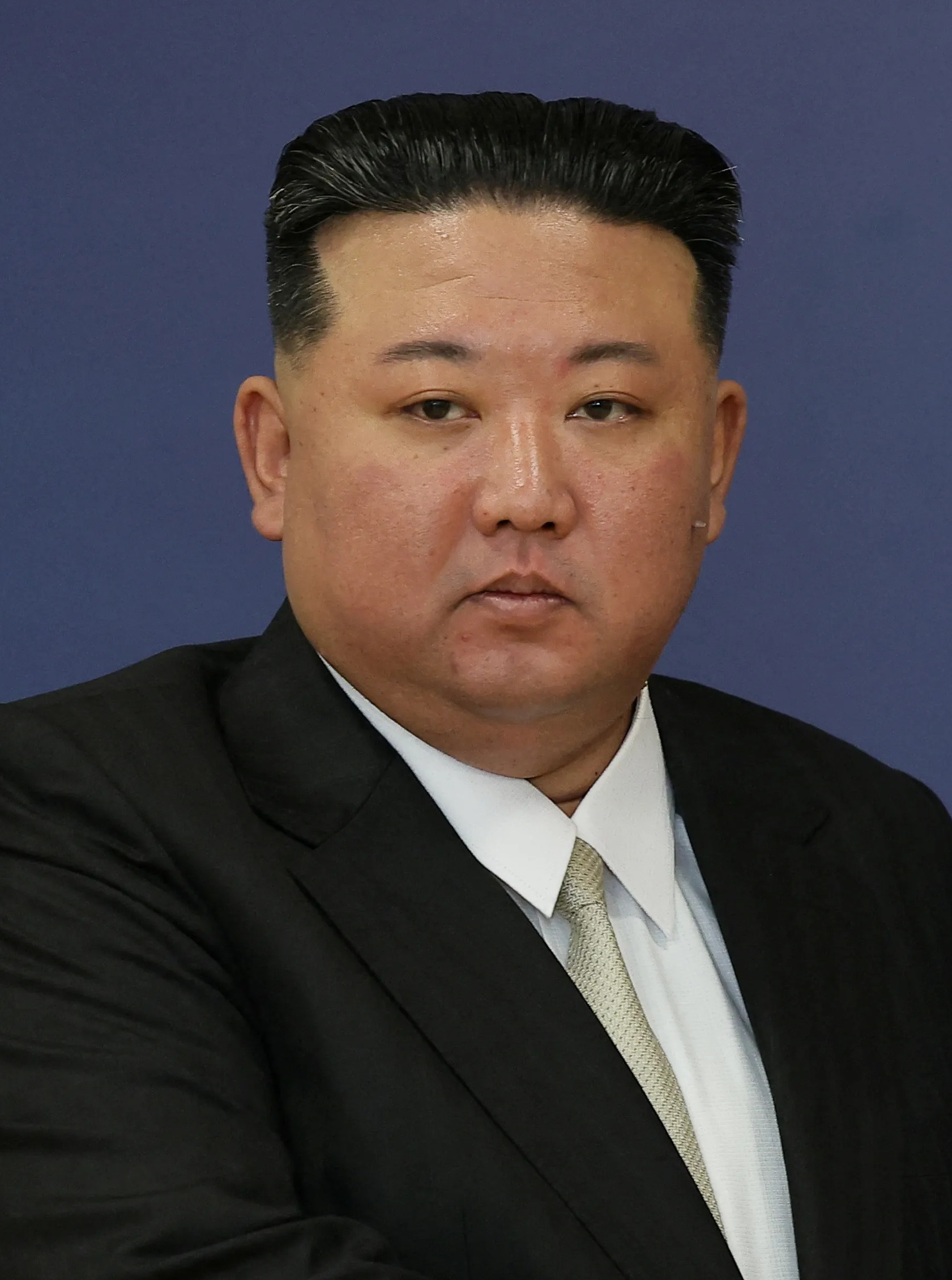
Kim Jong Un
Listed eight times: 2018, 2017, 2016, 2015, 2014, 2013, 2012, and 2011
(Finalist in 2023, 2022, 2021, 2020, and 2019)

Donald Trump
Listed eight times: 2026, 2025, 2021, 2020, 2019, 2018, 2017, and 2016
(Finalist in 2023 and 2022)

Vladimir Putin
Listed seven times: 2022, 2017, 2016, 2015, 2014, 2008, and 2004
(Finalist in 2023, 2021, 2020, 2019, 2018, 2012, 2011, 2009, and 2007)

Joe Biden
Listed six times: 2023, 2022, 2021, 2020, 2013, and 2011
(Finalist in 2016)

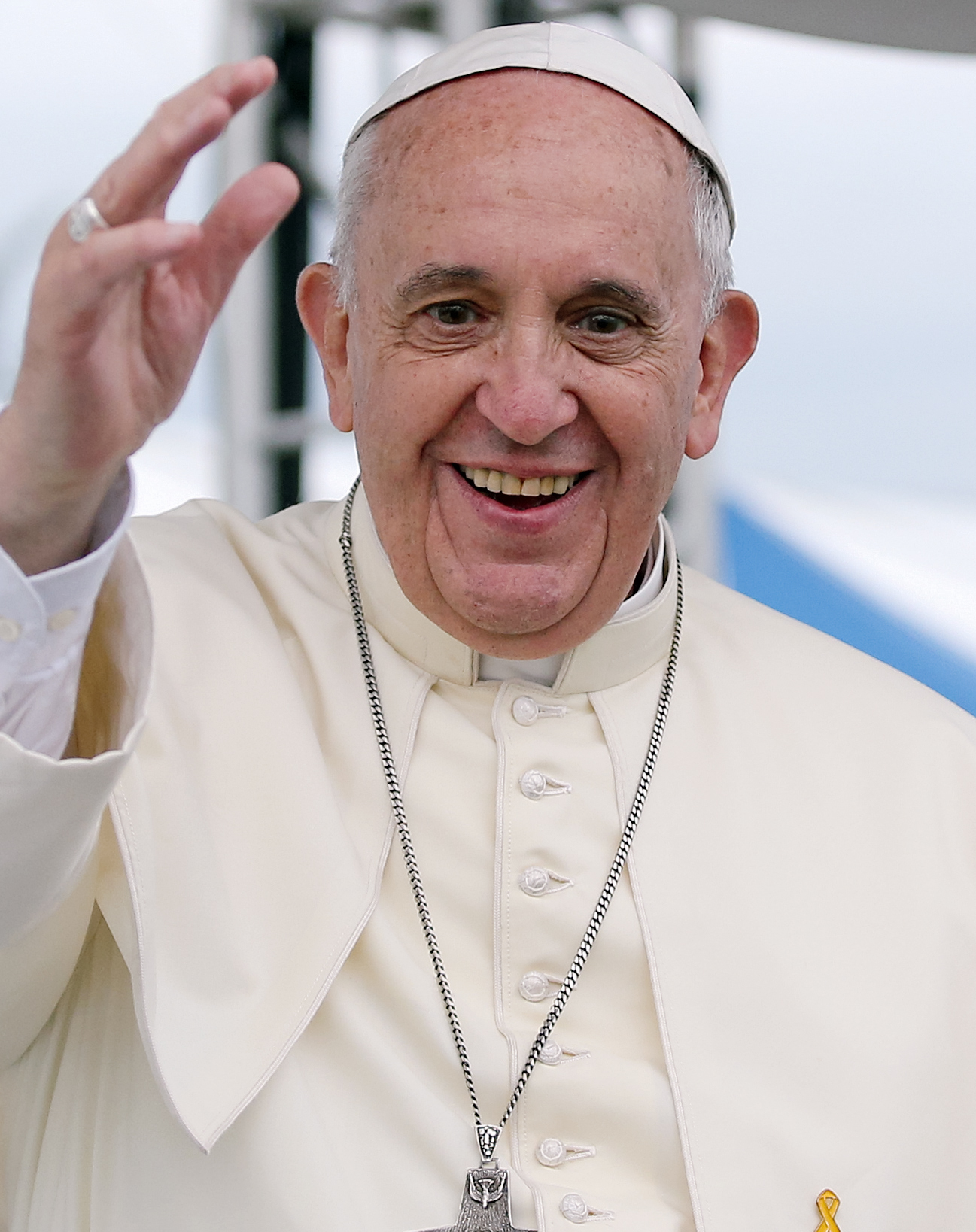
Pope Francis
Listed six times: 2019, 2017, 2016, 2015, 2014, and 2013
(Finalist in 2023, 2022, 2021, 2020, and 2018)

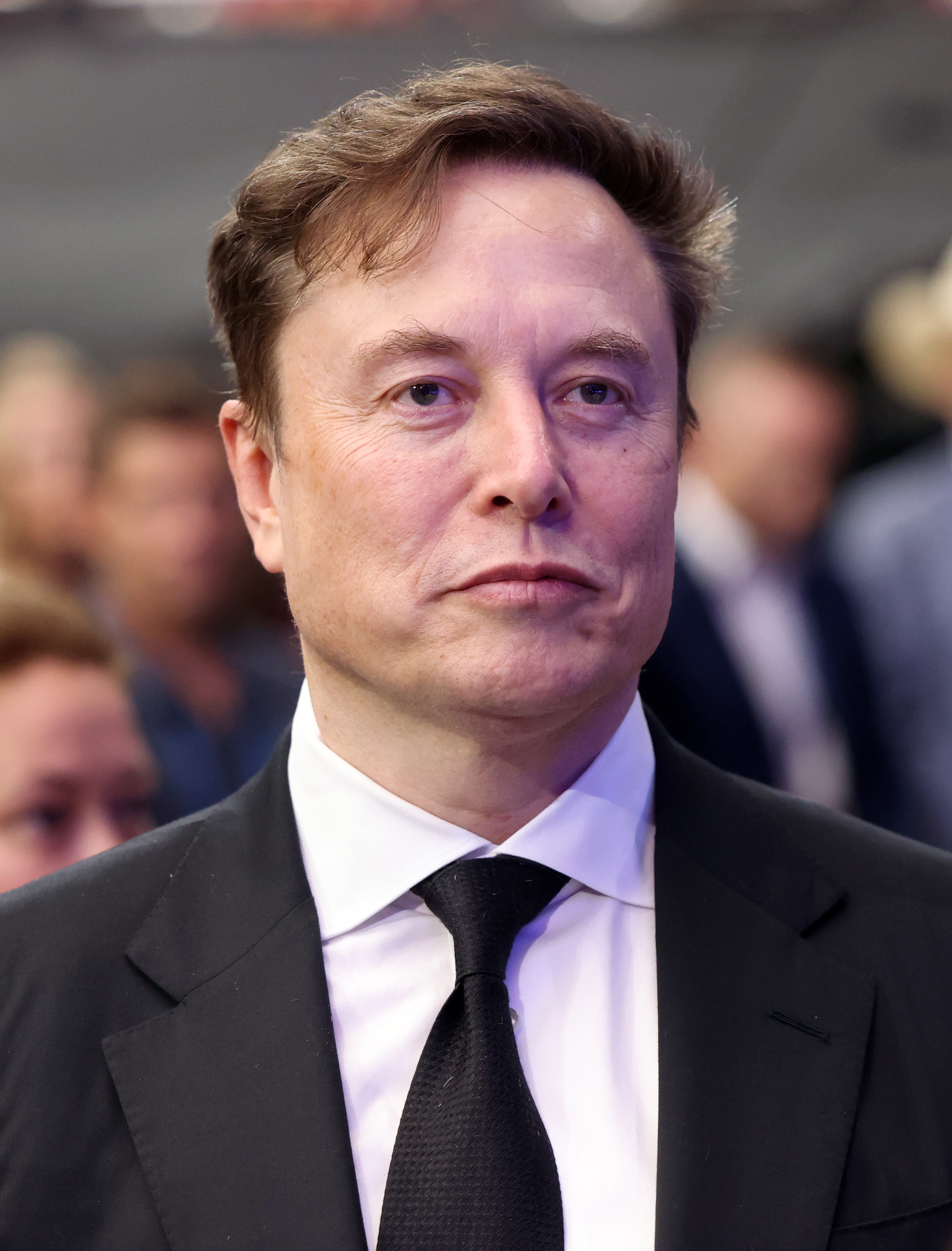
Elon Musk
Listed six times: 2025, 2023, 2021, 2018, 2013, and 2010
(Finalist in 2022, 2020, 2019, 2017, 2016, and 2015)

=== Listed five times ===
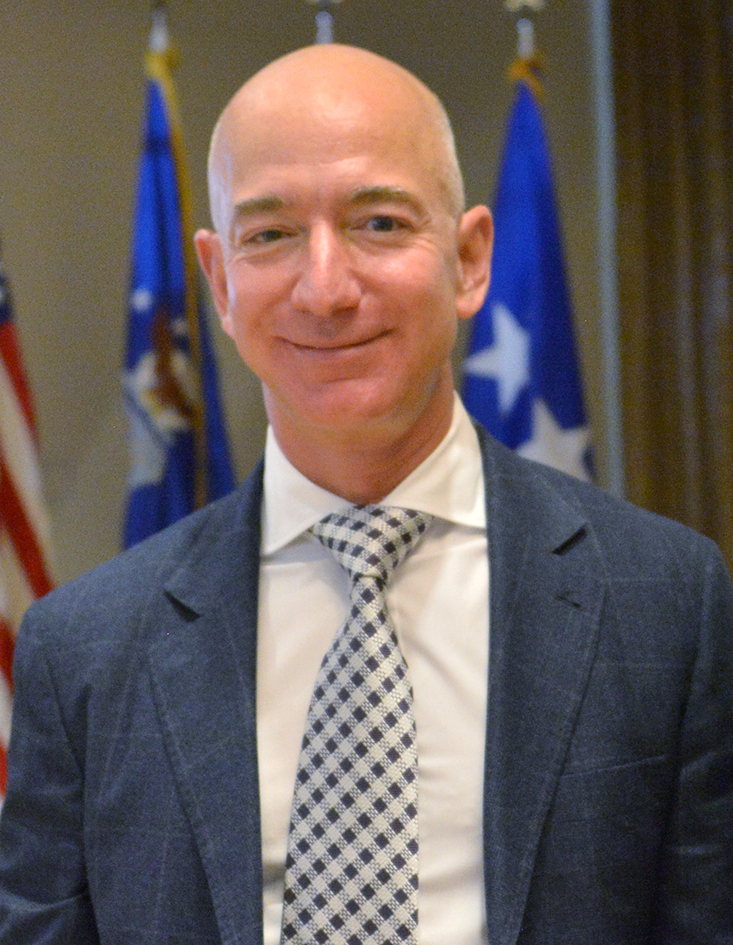
Jeff Bezos
2018, 2017, 2014, 2009, and 2008
(Finalist in 2021, 2020, 2019, 2016, 2015, 2013, and 2012)

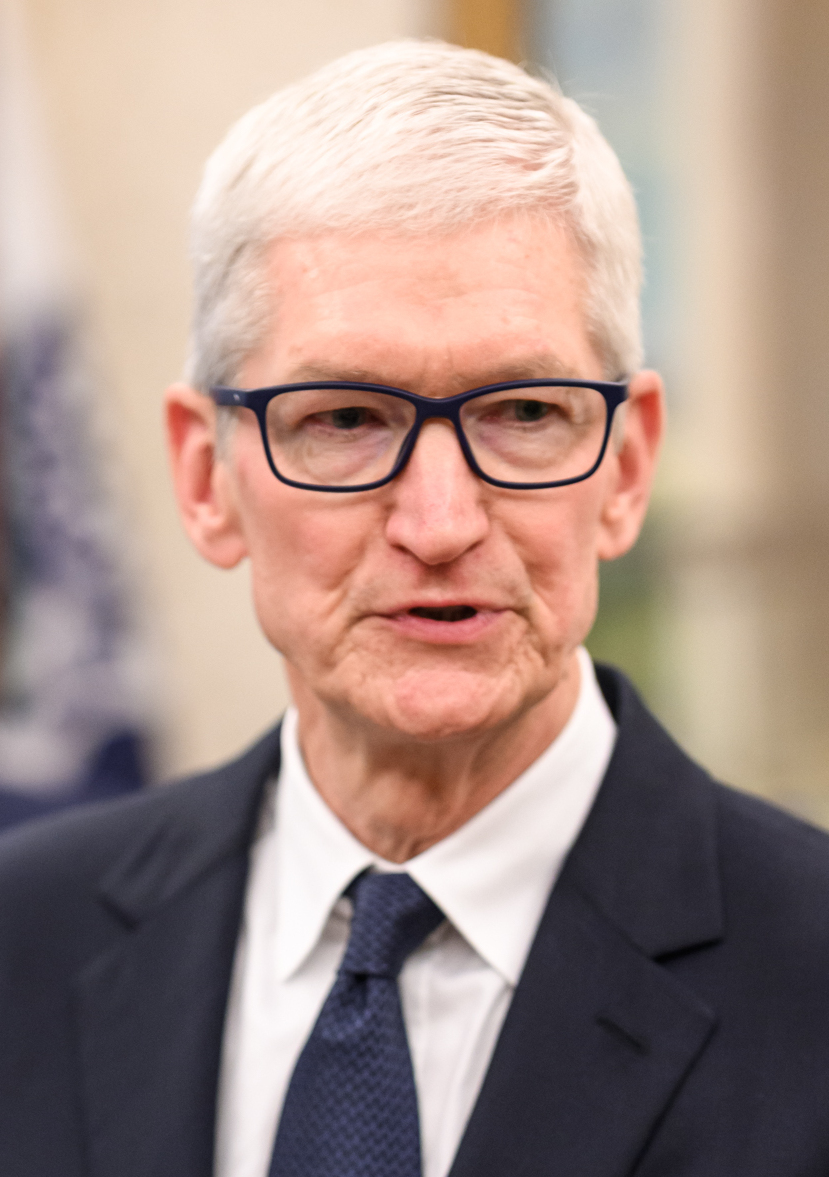
Tim Cook
2022, 2021, 2016, 2015, and 2012
(Finalist in 2023, 2020, 2019, 2018, 2017, and 2014)

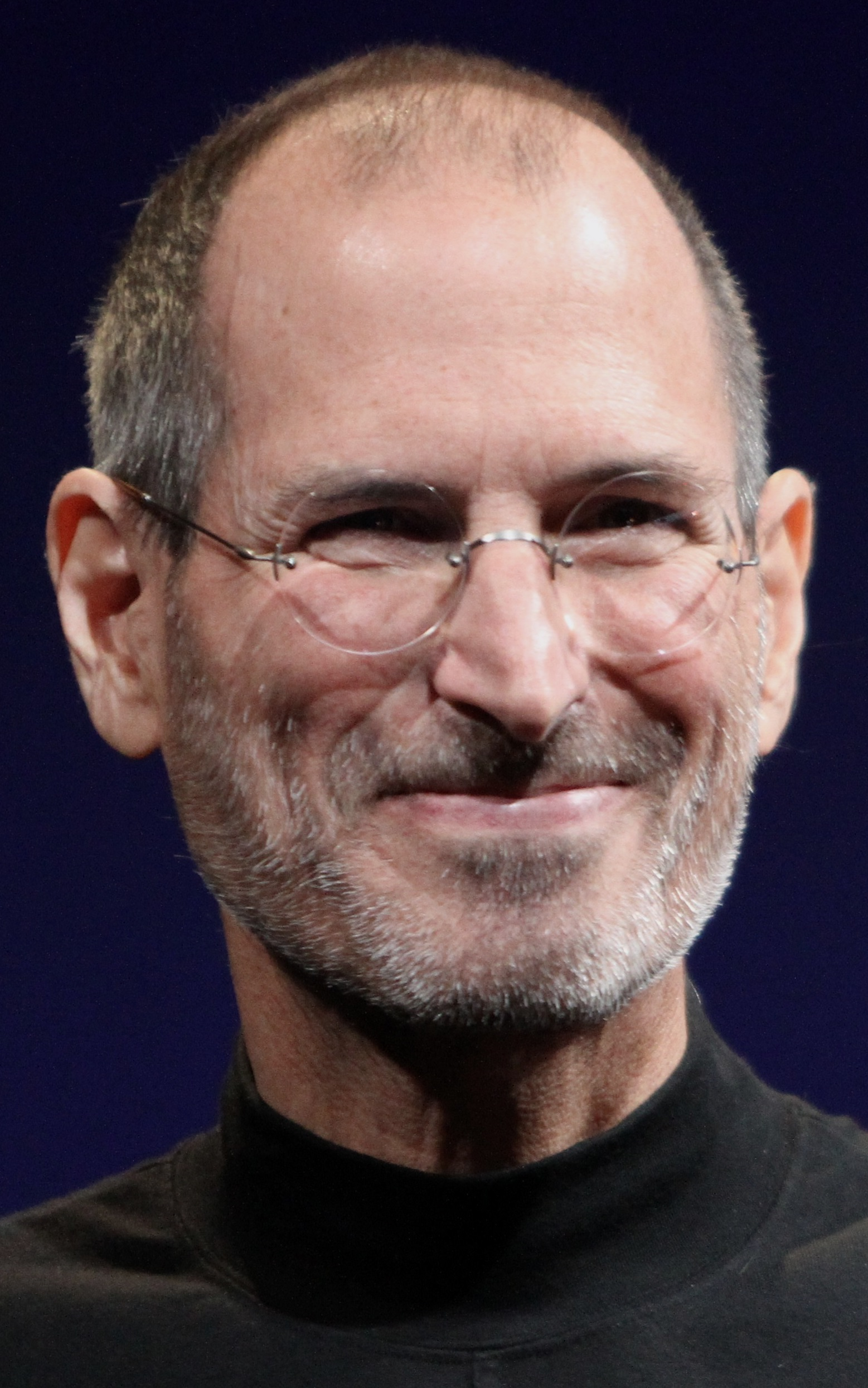
Steve Jobs
2010, 2008, 2007, 2005, and 2004
(Finalist in 2011 and 2009)

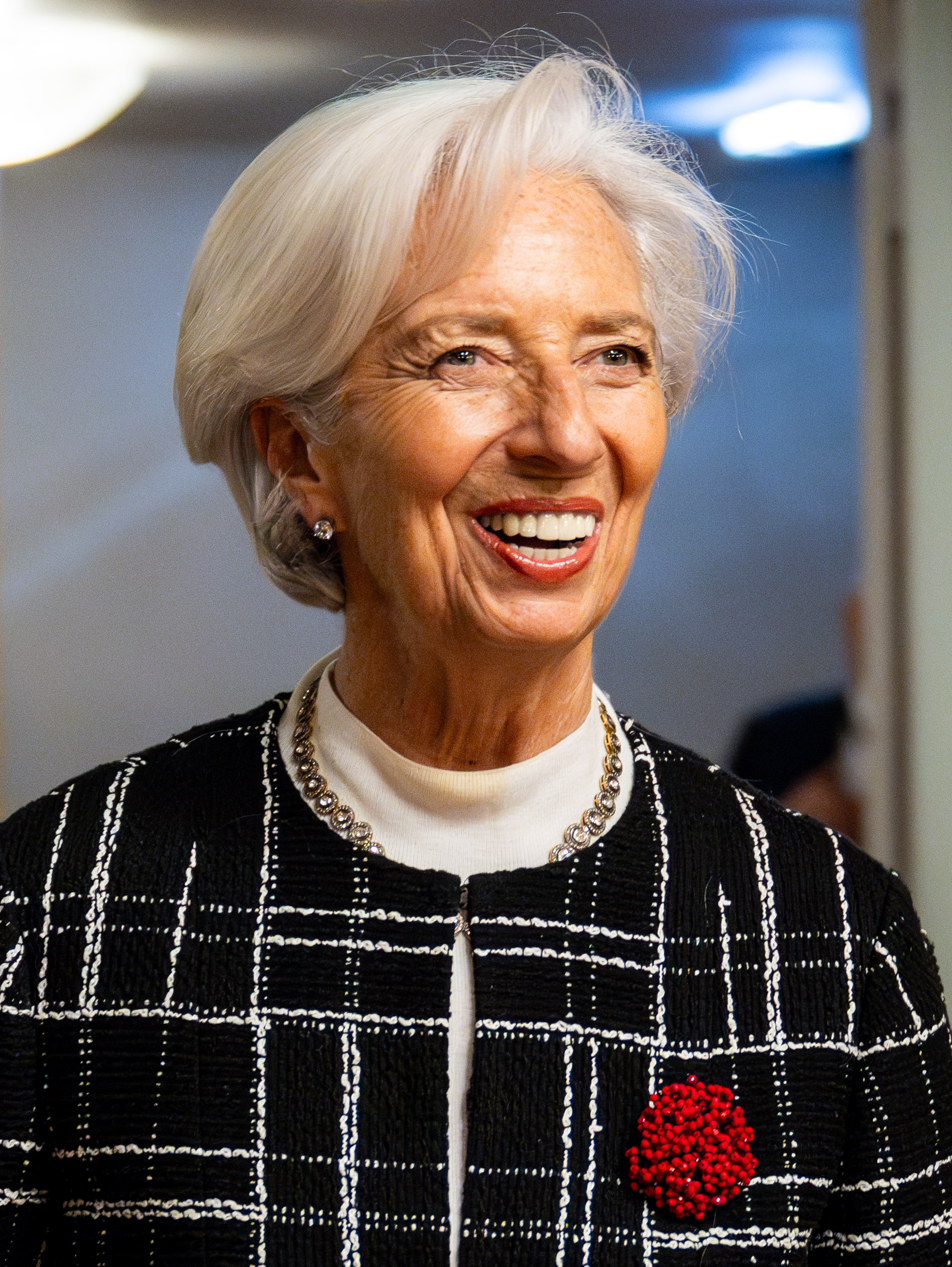
Christine Lagarde
2022, 2016, 2012, 2010, and 2009
(Finalist in 2014)

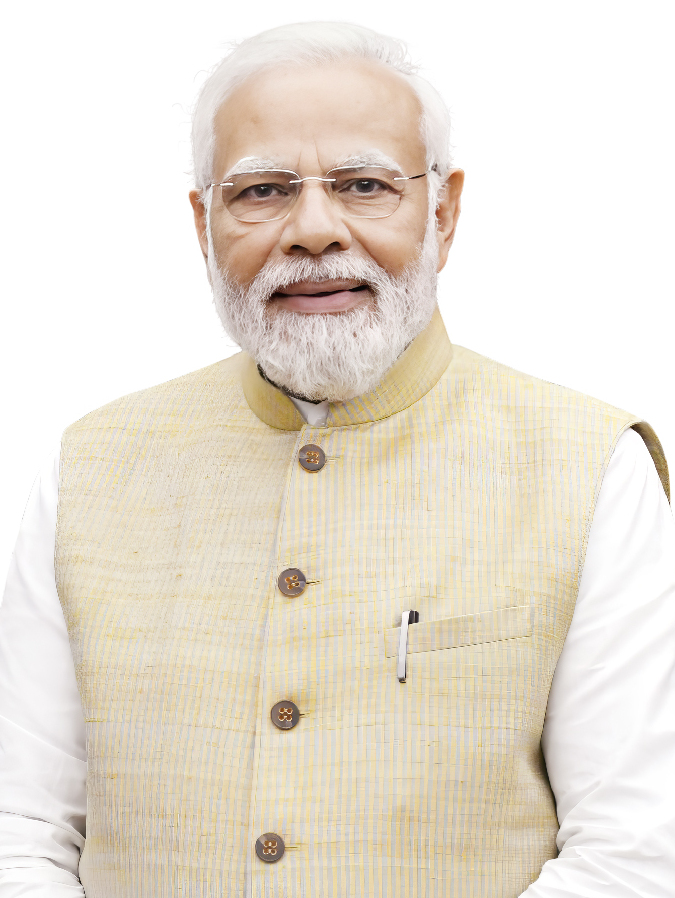
Narendra Modi
2021, 2020, 2017, 2015, and 2014
(Finalist in 2023, 2022, 2019, 2018, 2016, and 2012)

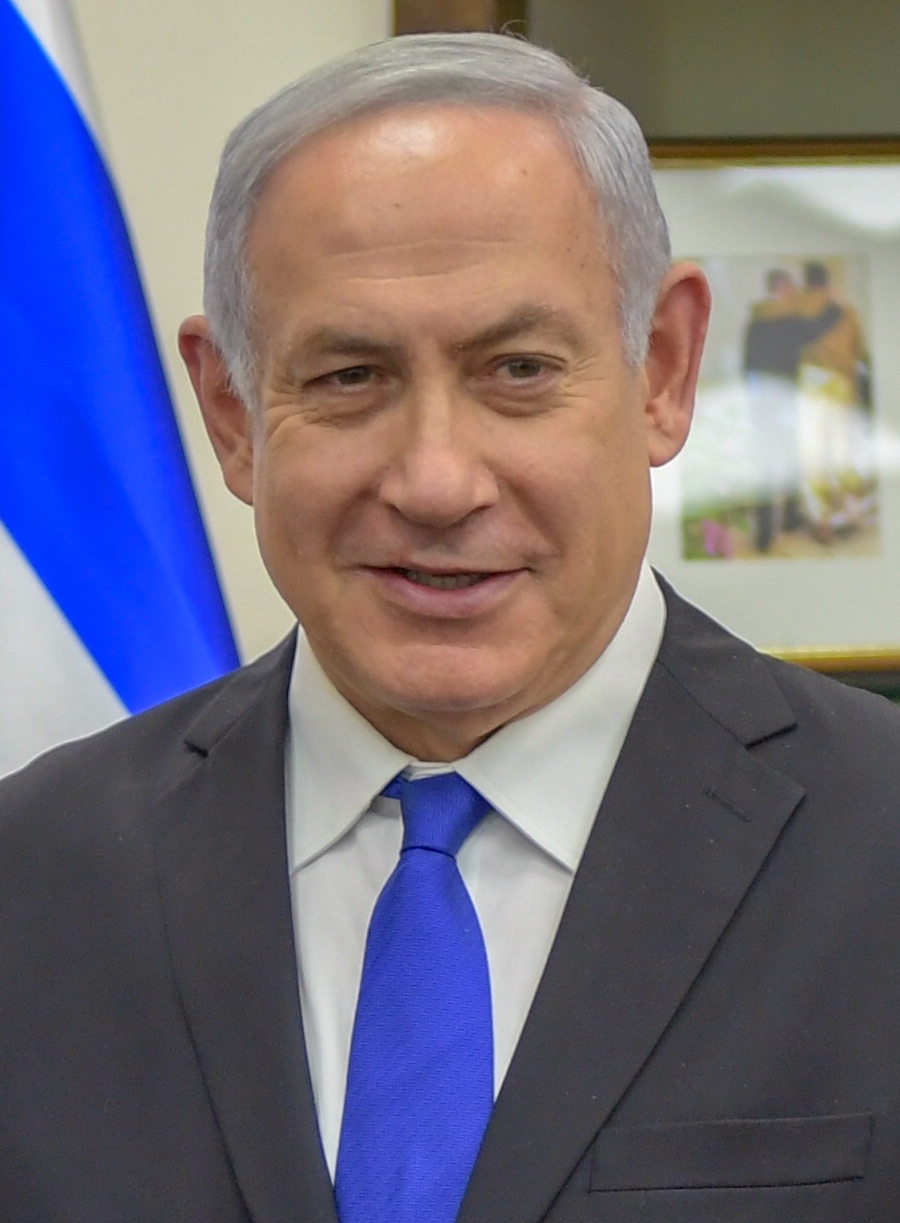
Benjamin Netanyahu
2026, 2019, 2015, 2012 and 2011
(Finalist in 2023, 2020, 2017, 2013, 2010, and 2009)

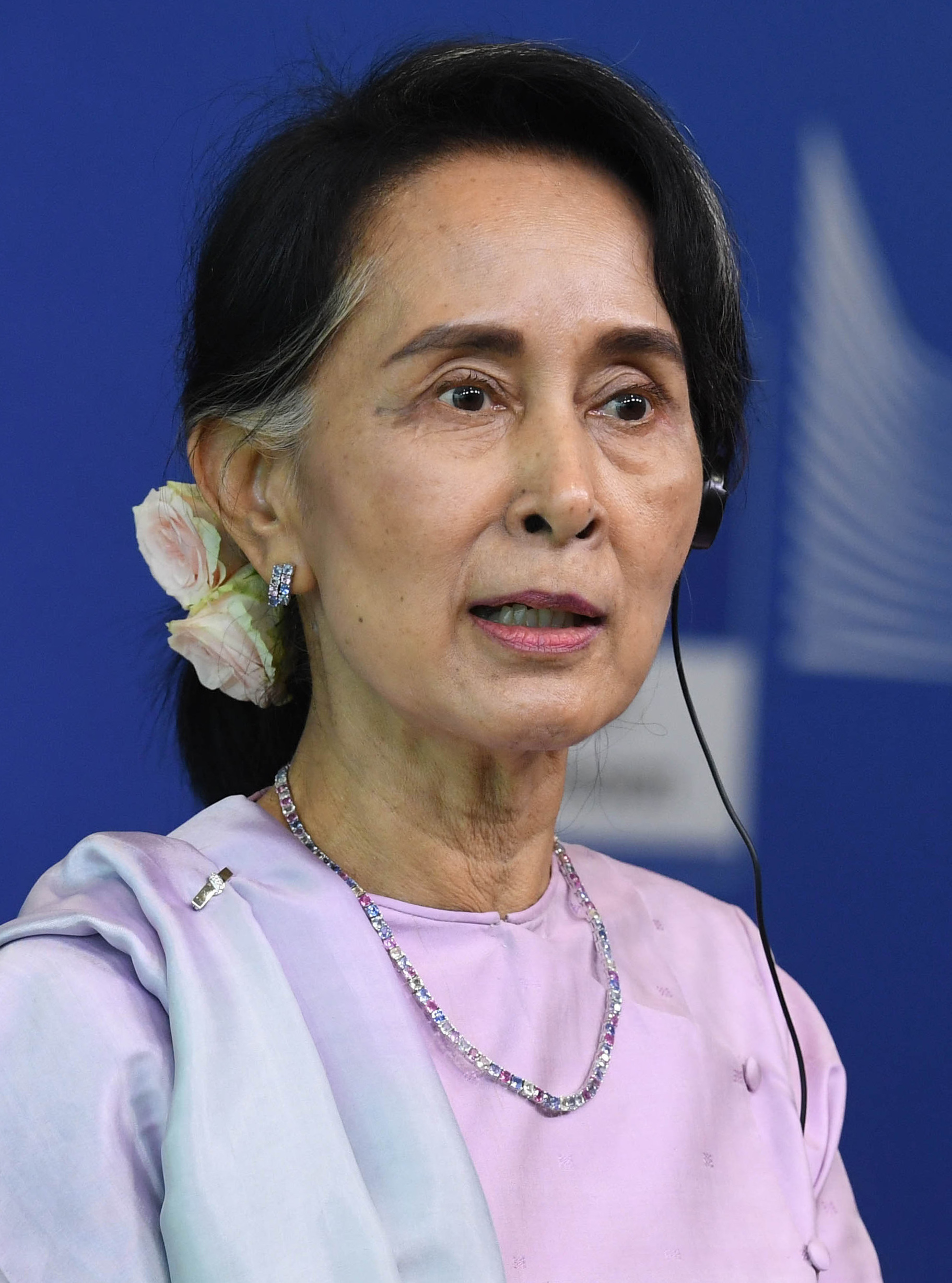
Aung San Suu Kyi
2016, 2013, 2011, 2008, and 2004
(Finalist in 2012 and 2009)

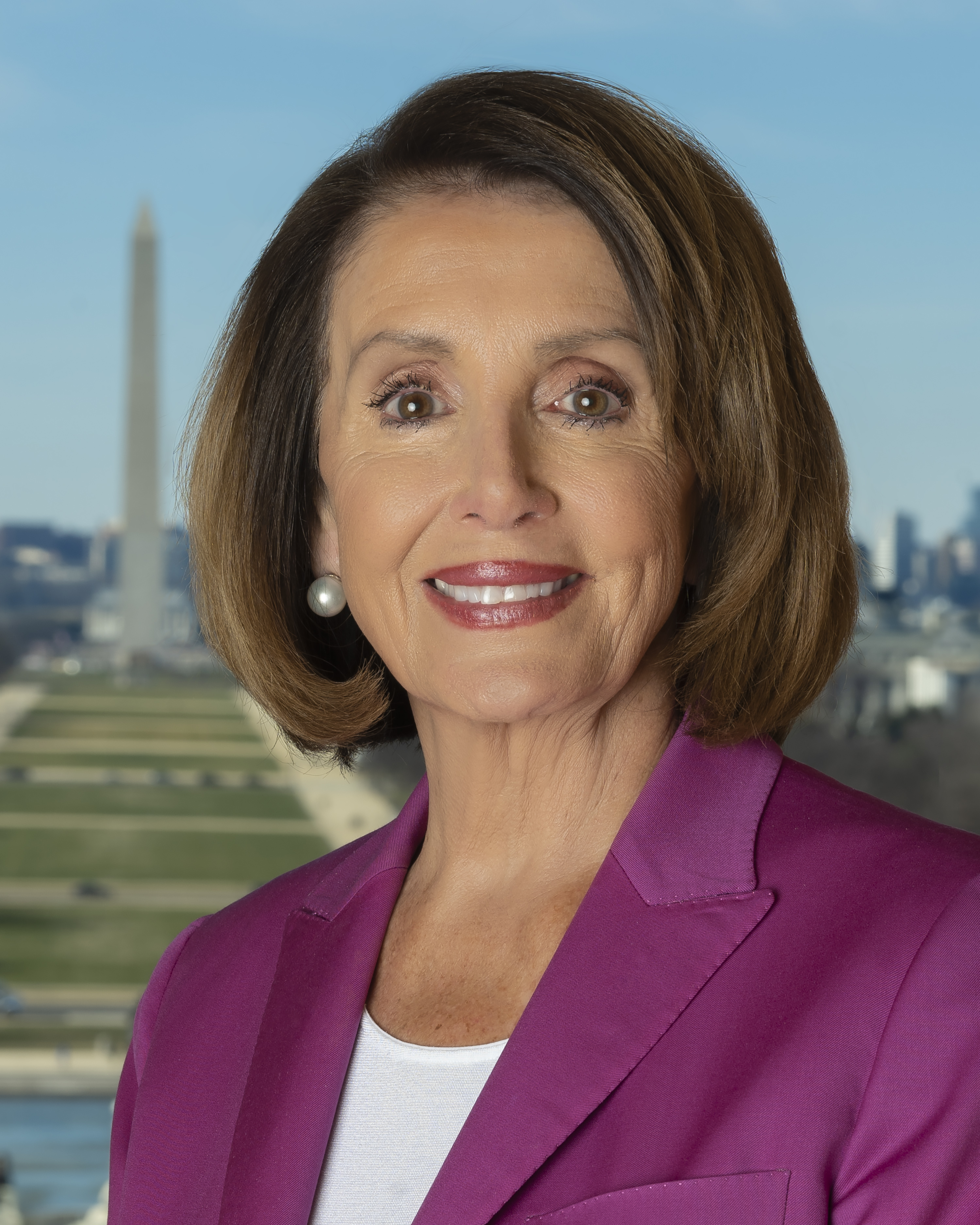
Nancy Pelosi
2020, 2019, 2018, 2010, and 2007
(Finalist in 2023, 2022, 2021, 2013, 2009, and 2008)

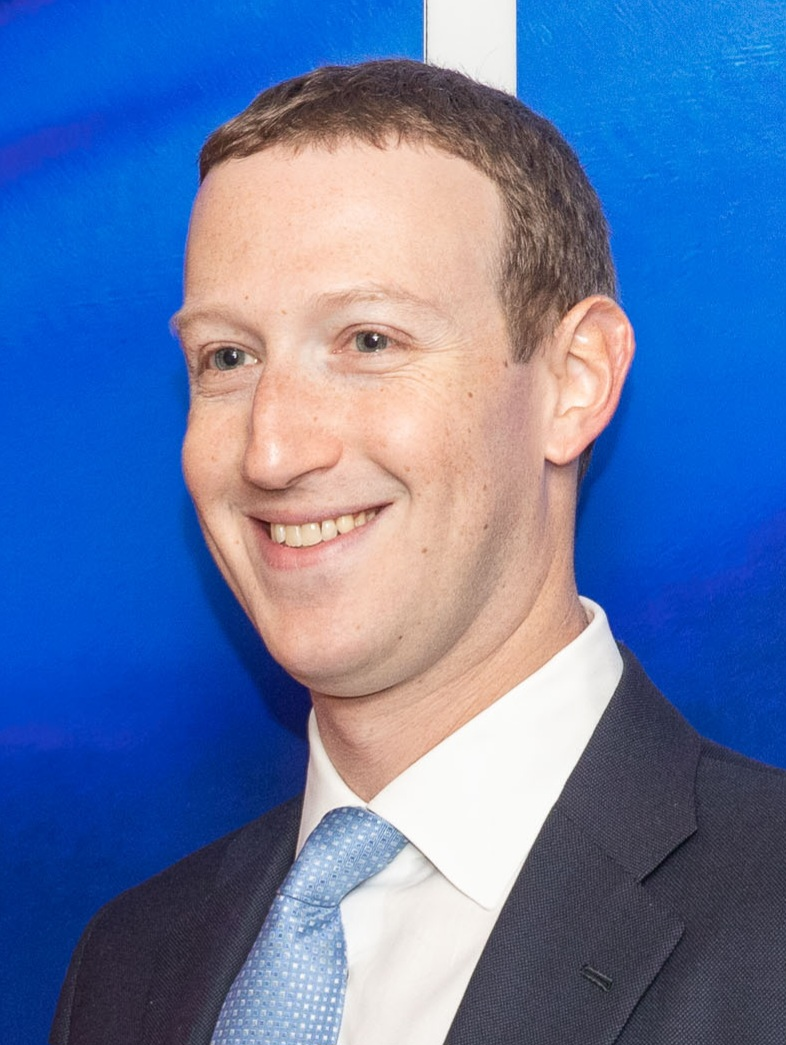
Mark Zuckerberg
2025, 2019, 2016, 2011, and 2008
(Finalist in 2023, 2022, 2021, 2020, 2018, 2017, 2015, 2014, 2012, and 2009)

=== Listed four times ===
George W. Bush
2008, 2006, 2005, and 2004
(Finalist in 2009 and 2007)

Bill Clinton
2010, 2006, 2005, and 2004
(Finalist in 2015, 2013, and 2007)

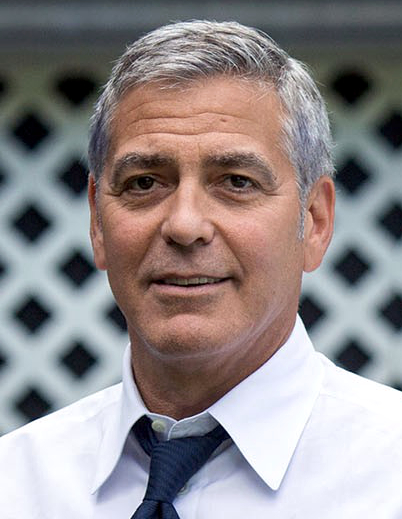
George Clooney
2009, 2008, 2007, and 2006
(Finalist in 2012, 2011, and 2010)

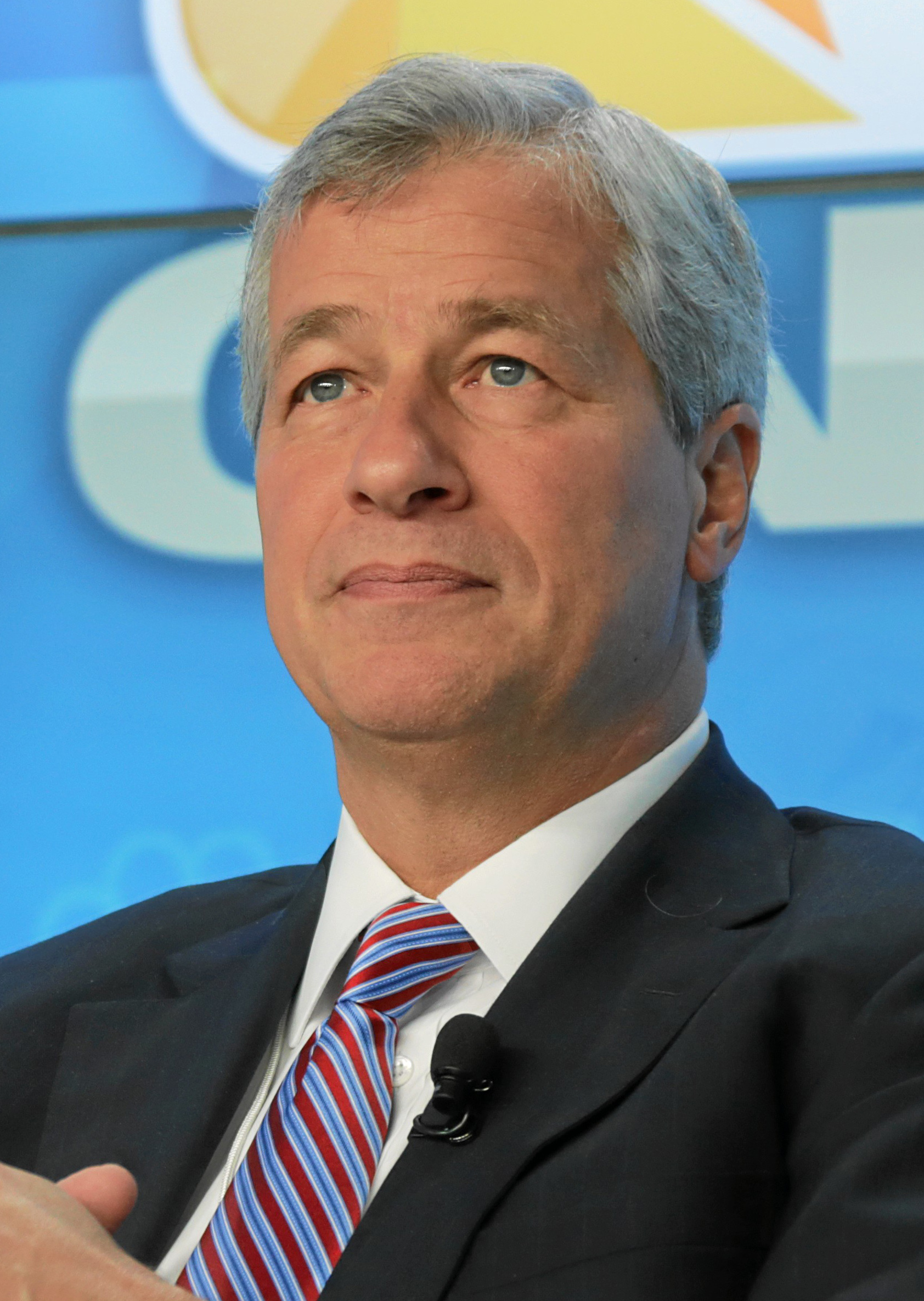
Jamie Dimon
2011, 2009, 2008, and 2006
(Finalist in 2015 and 2012)

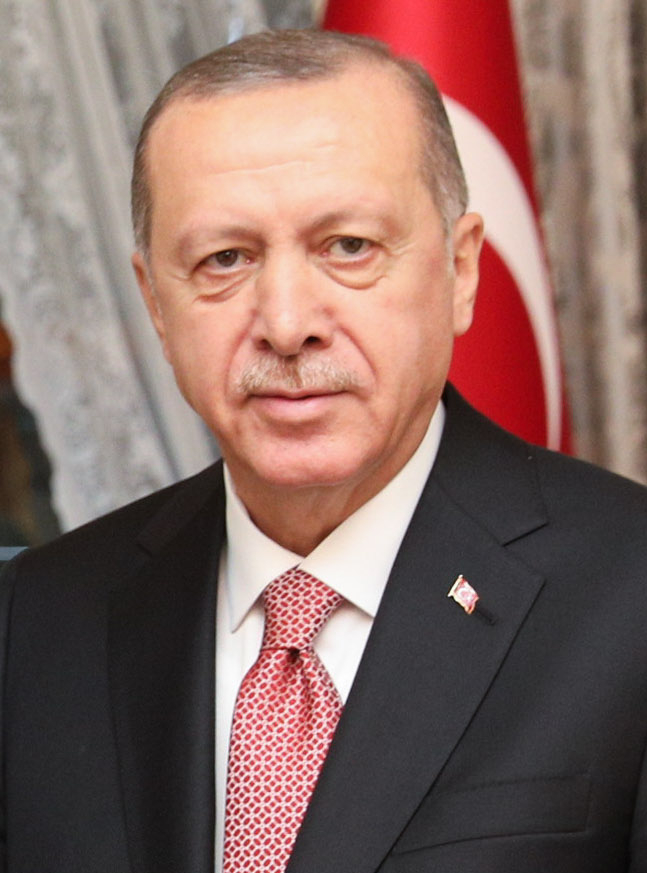
Recep Tayyip Erdoğan
2017, 2016, 2010, and 2004
(Finalist in 2023, 2022, 2021, 2019, 2015, 2014, and 2012)

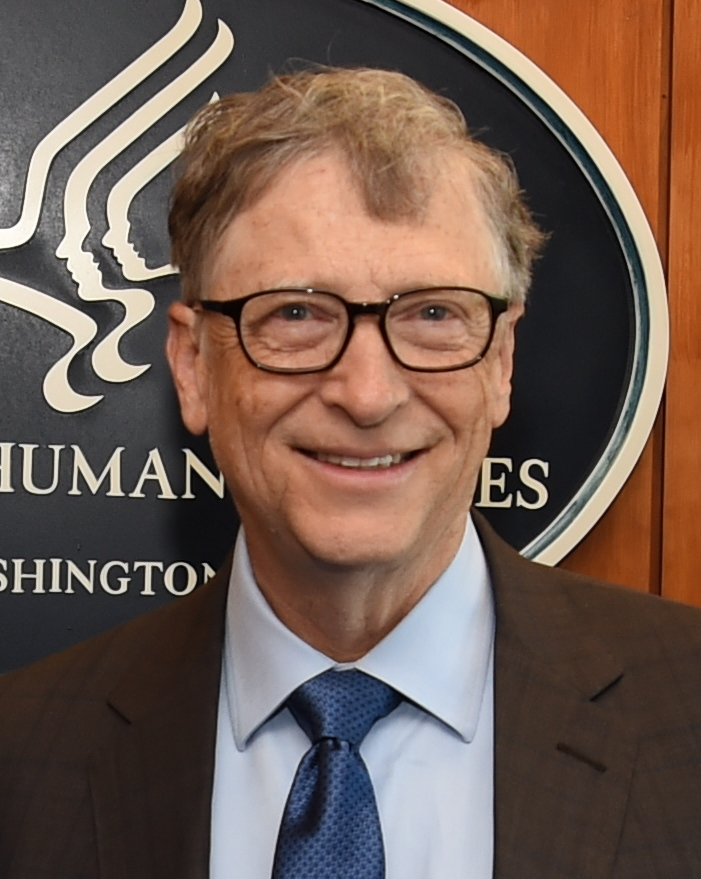
Bill Gates
2006, 2005, 2004, and the 20th century
(Finalist in 2019, 2018, 2017, 2016, 2014, 2010, and 2008)

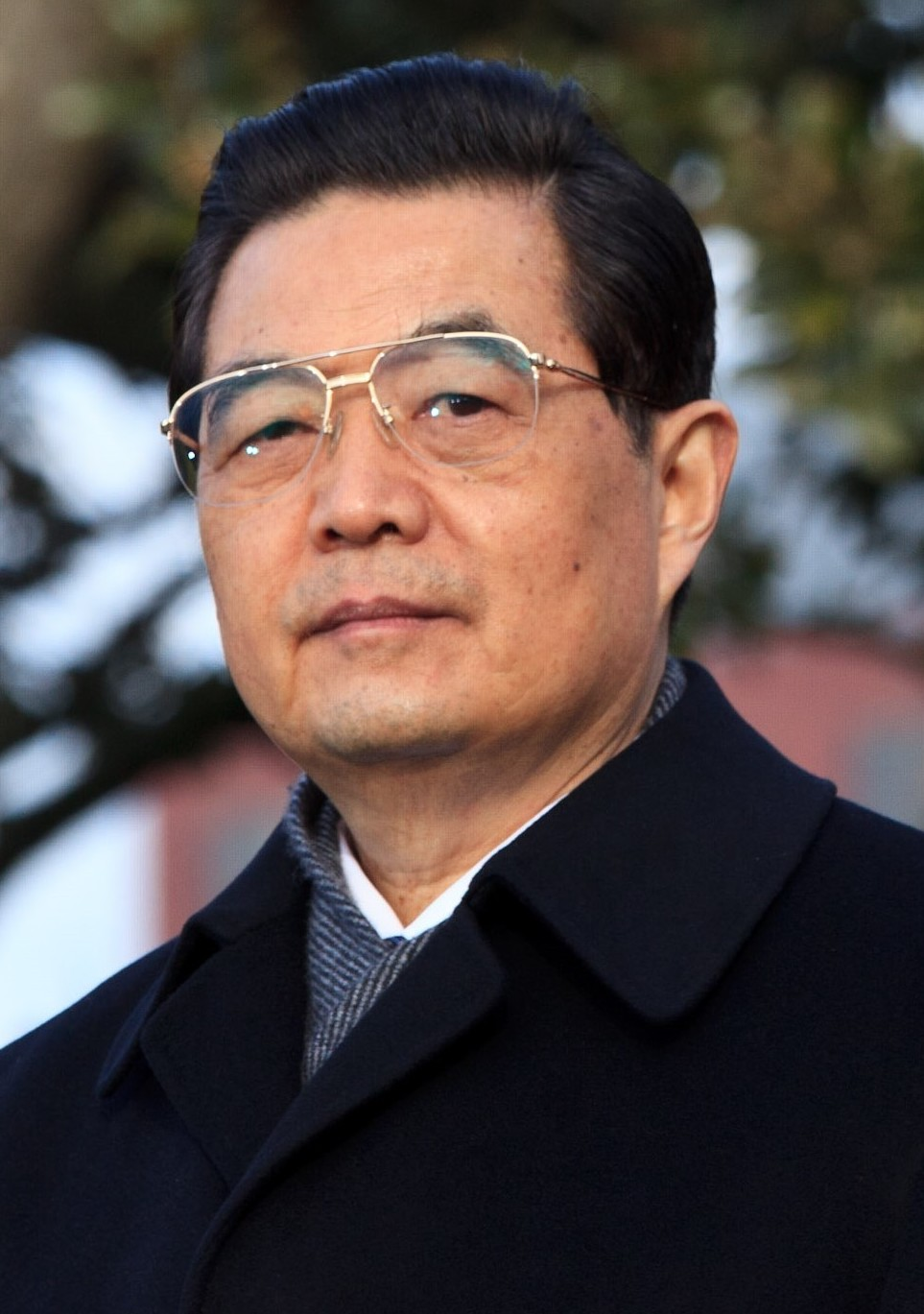
Hu Jintao
2008, 2007, 2005, and 2004
(Finalist in 2011 and 2009)

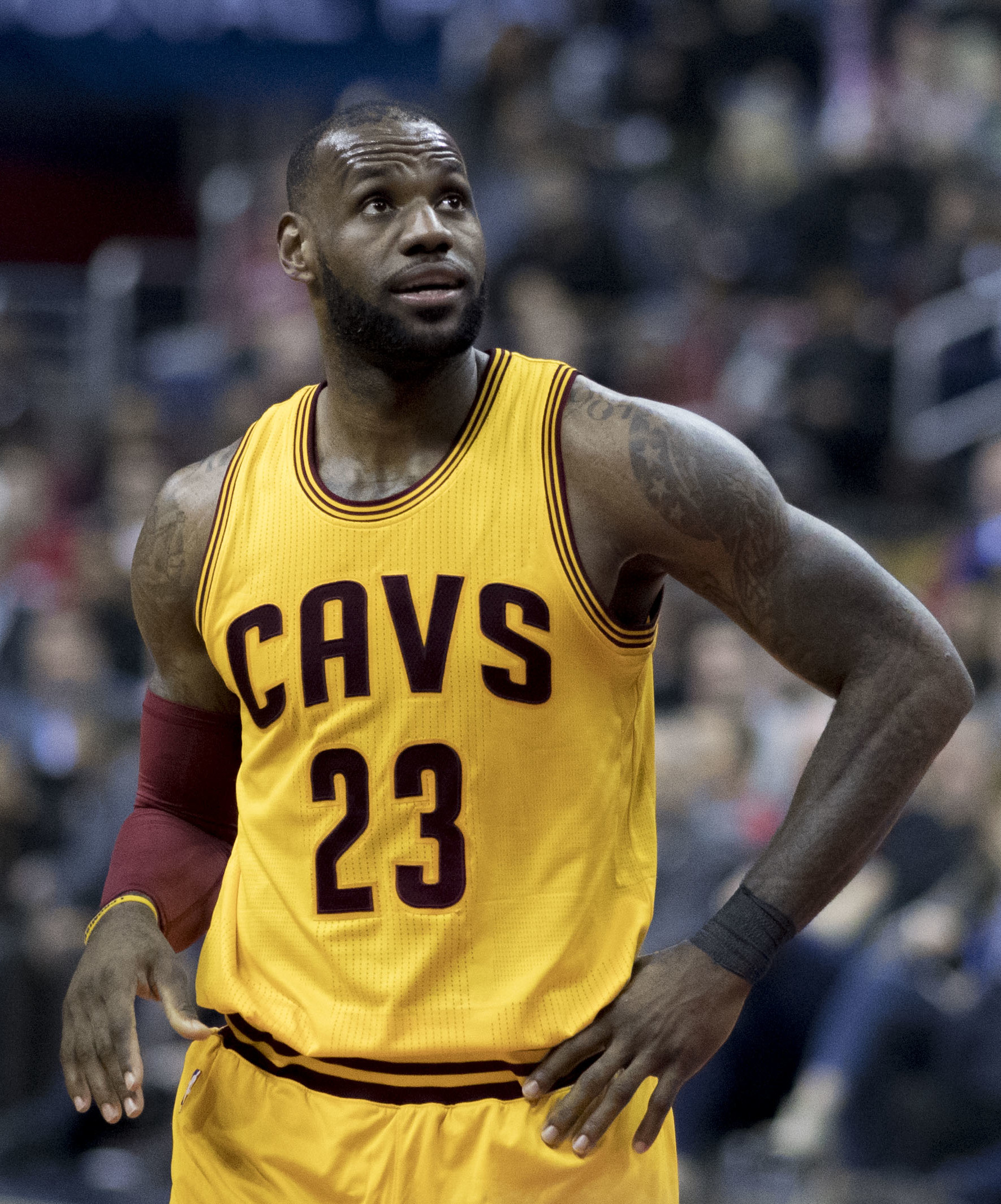
LeBron James
2019, 2017, 2013, and 2005
(Finalist in 2021, 2020, 2018, and 2015)

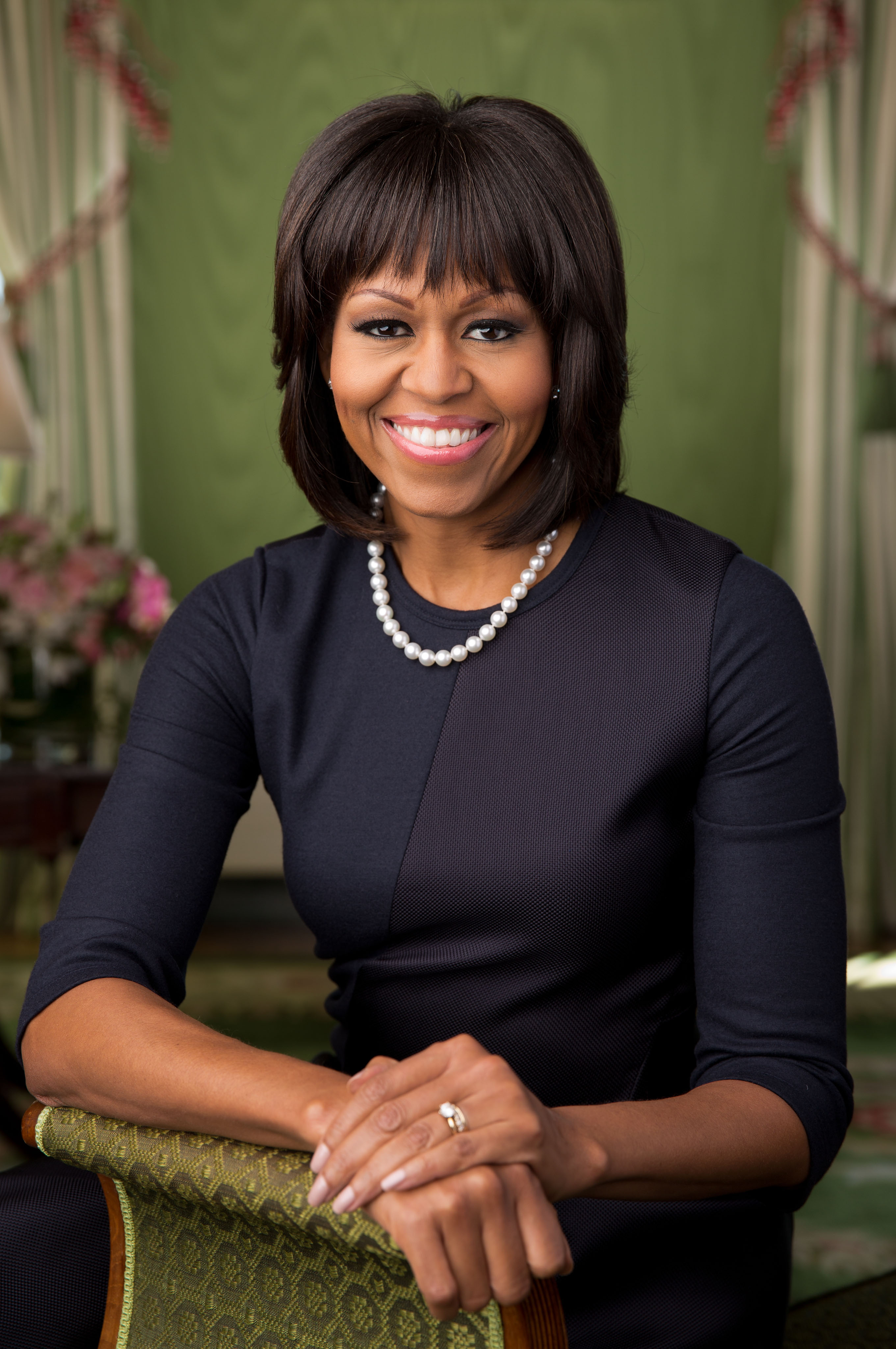
Michelle Obama
2019, 2013, 2011, and 2009
(Finalist in 2016, 2015, 2014, 2012, and 2010)

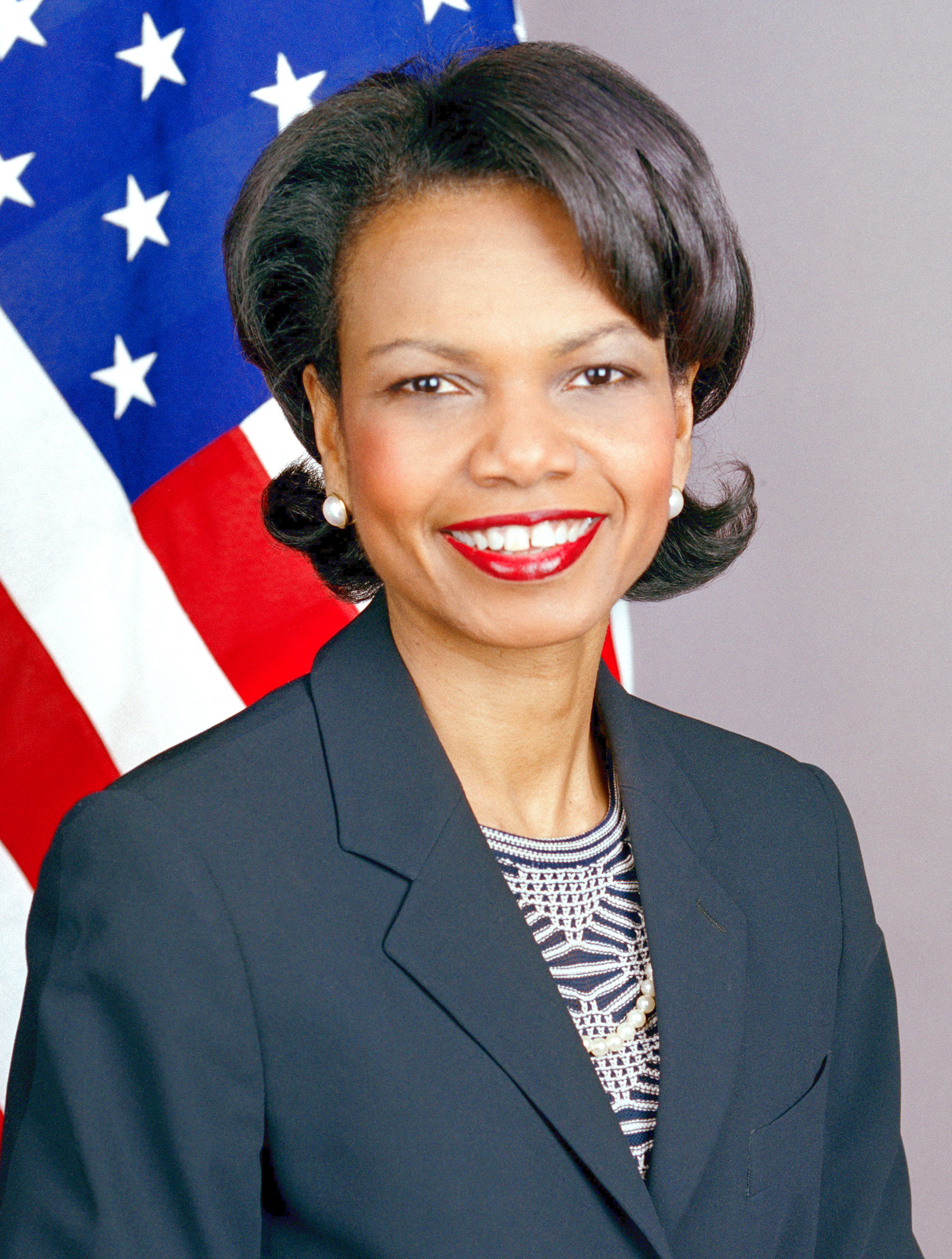
Condoleezza Rice
2007, 2006, 2005, and 2004
(Finalist in 2008)

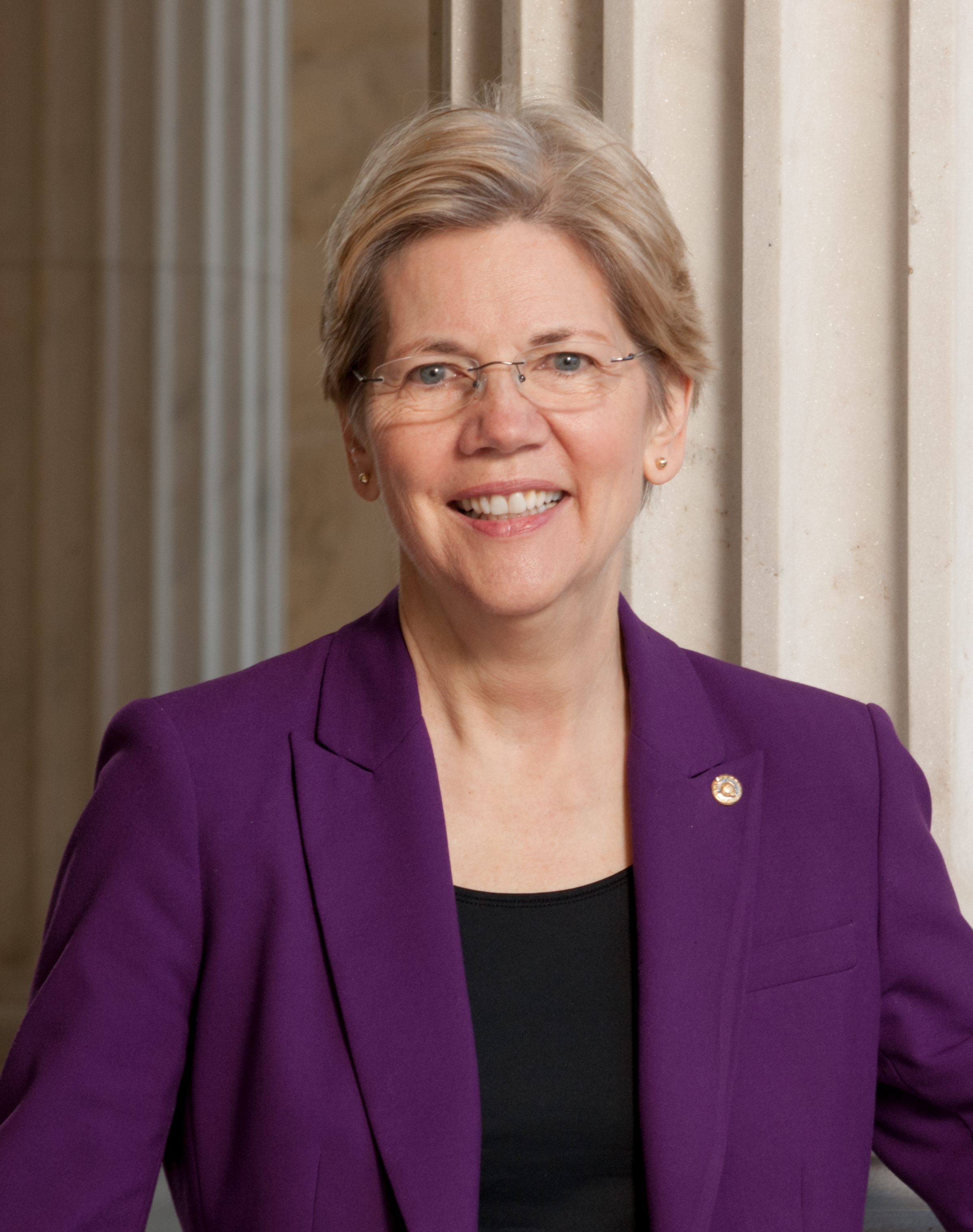
Elizabeth Warren
2017, 2015, 2010, and 2009
(Finalist in 2020, 2019, 2018, 2016, 2014, 2013, and 2011)

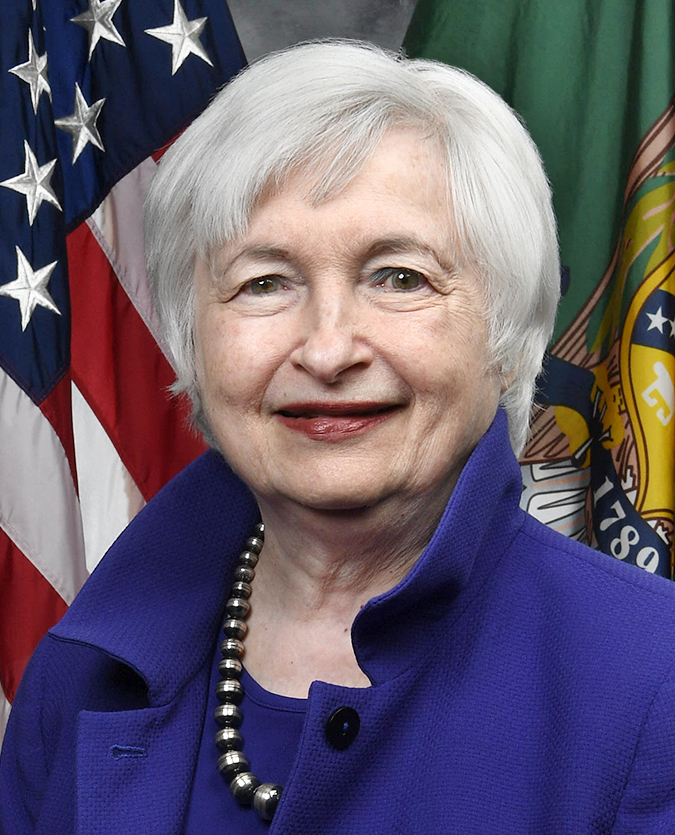
Janet Yellen
2023, 2017, 2015, and 2014
(Finalist in 2016)

=== Listed three times ===
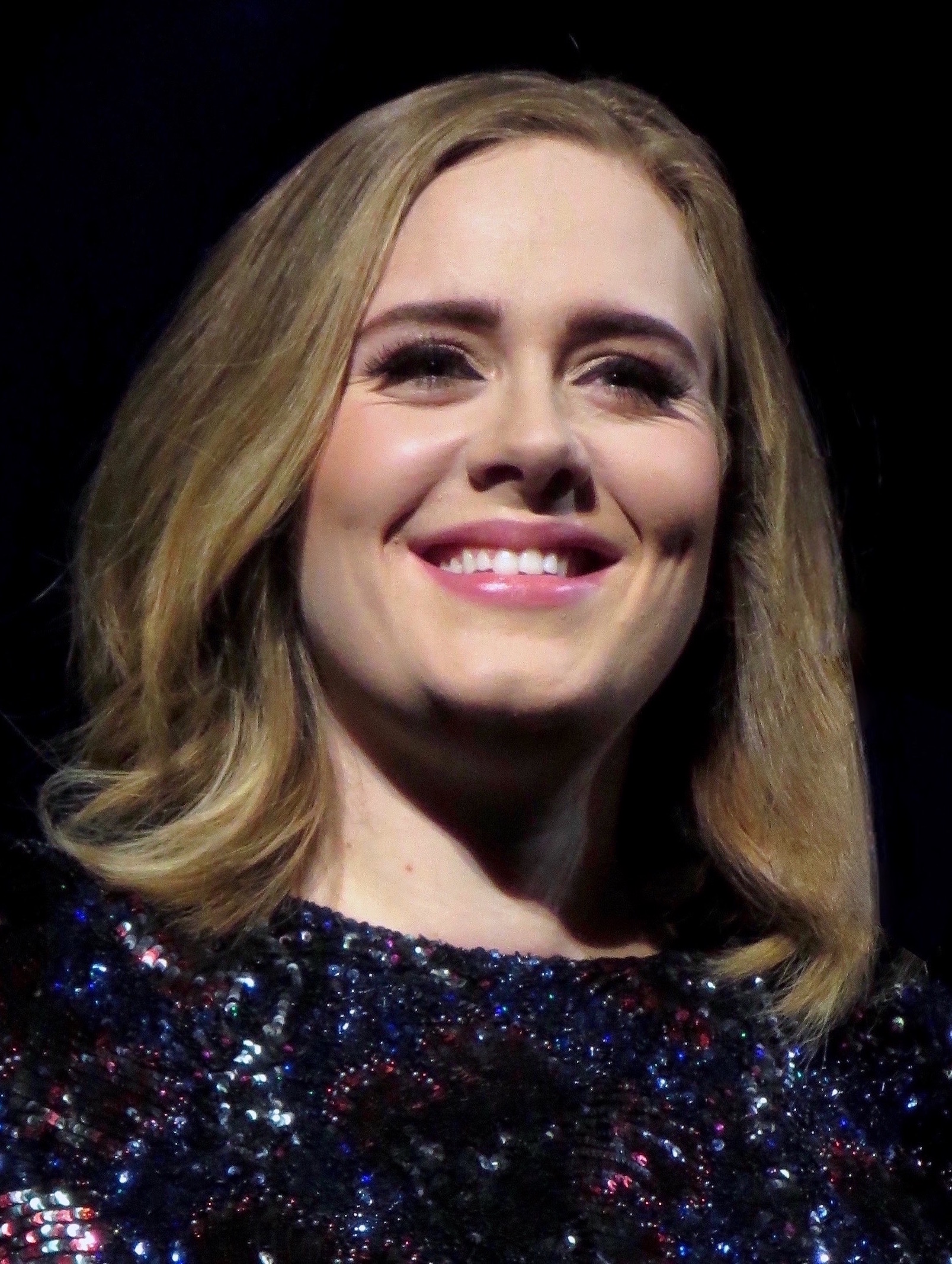
Adele
2022, 2016, and 2012
(Finalist in 2023)

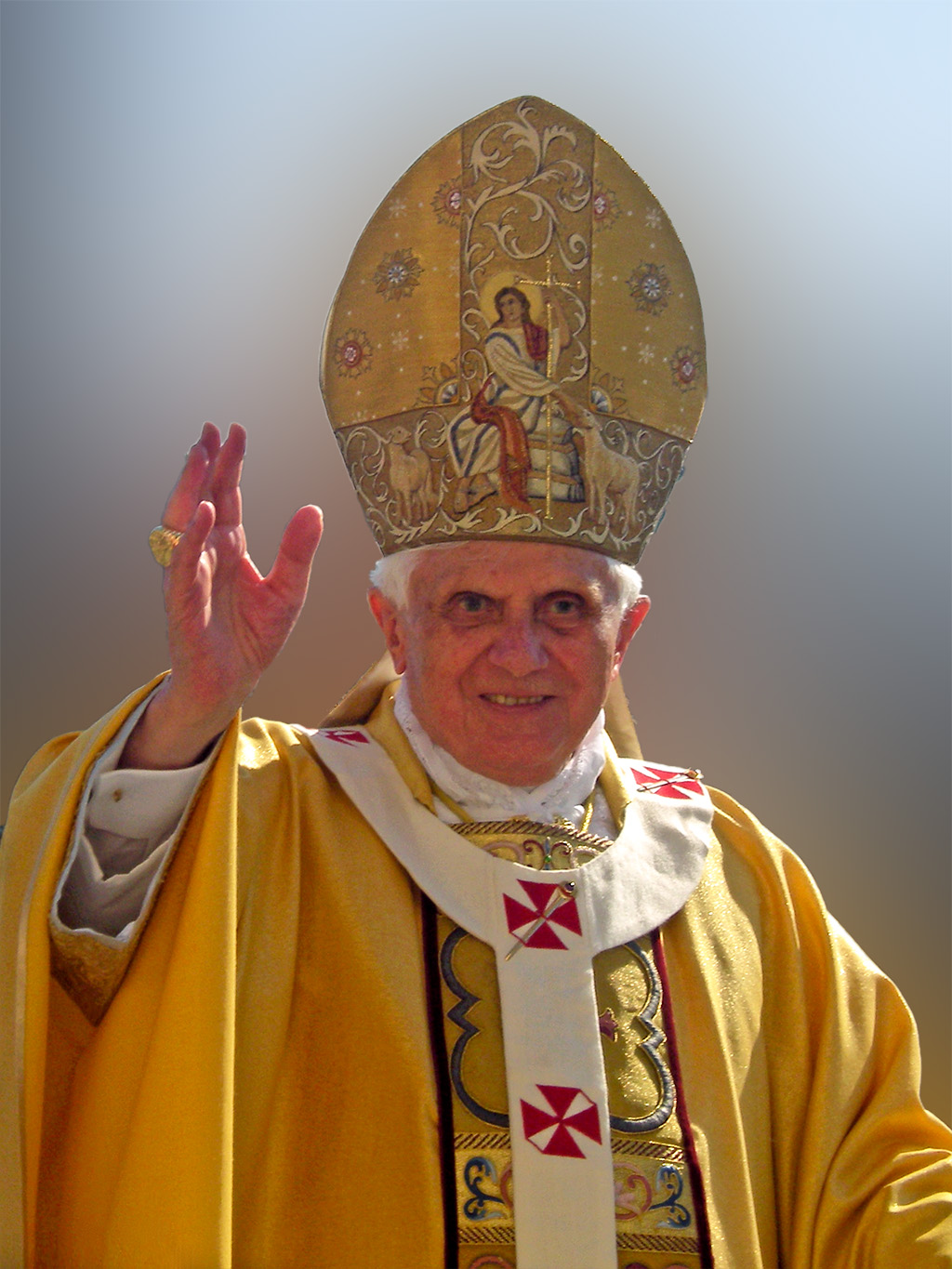
Pope Benedict XVI
2007, 2006, and 2005
(Finalist in 2013, 2009, and 2008)

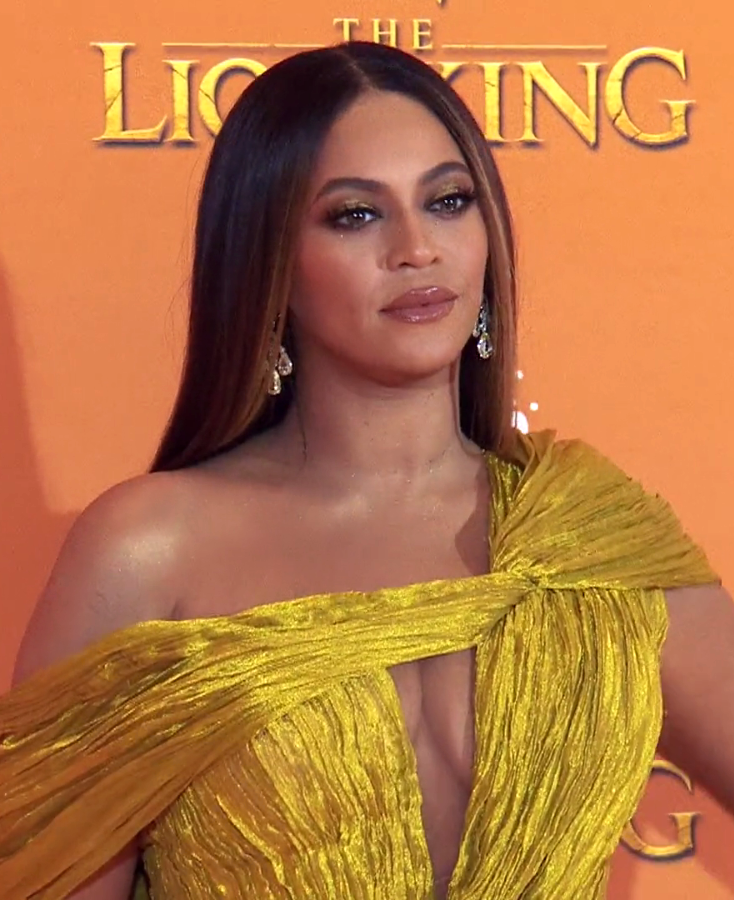
Beyoncé
2023, 2014, and 2013
(Finalist in 2021, 2020, 2019, 2018, 2017, 2016, 2015, 2012, 2011, and 2010)

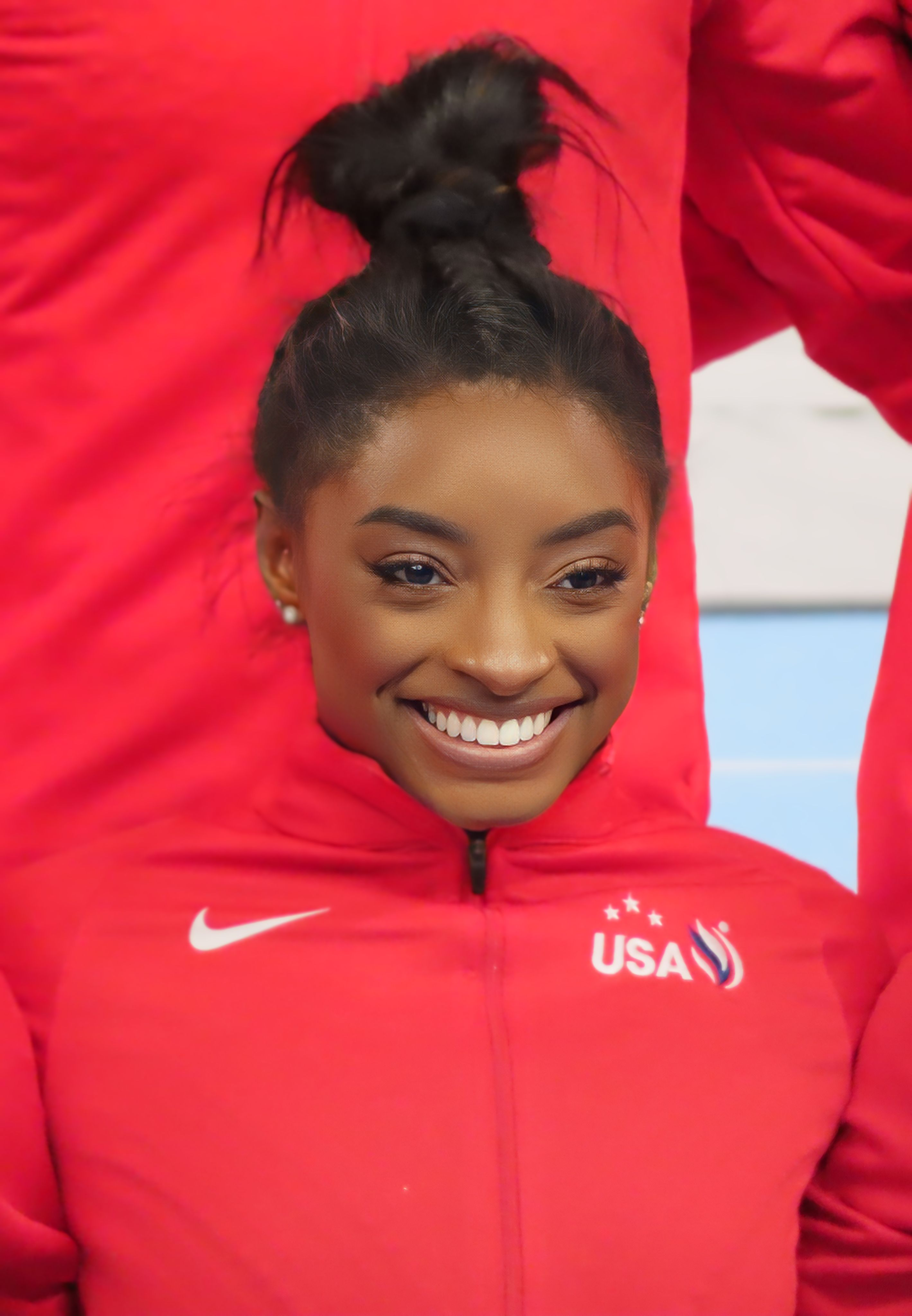
Simone Biles
2025, 2021, and 2017
(Finalist in 2019)

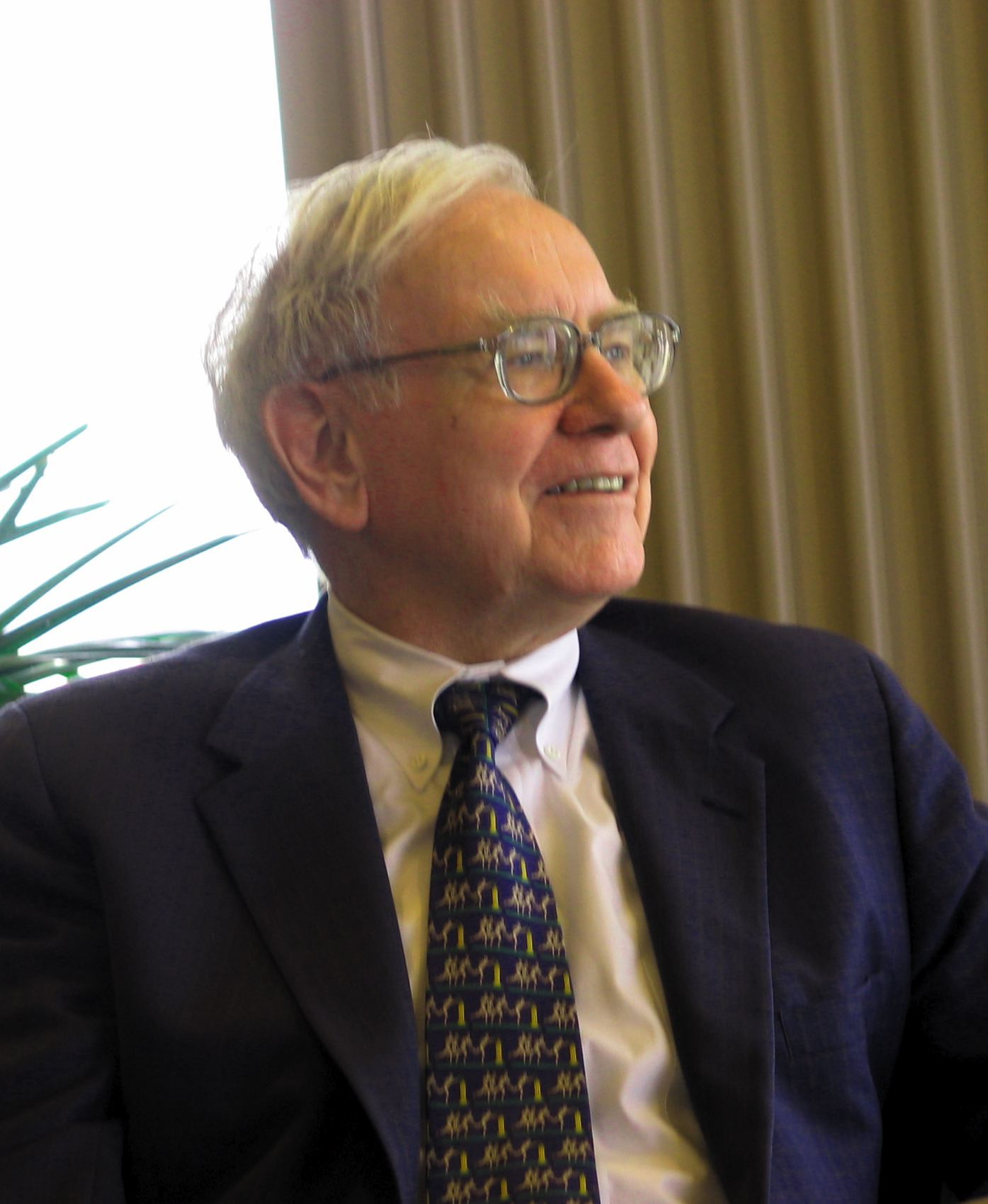
Warren Buffett
2012, 2007, and 2004
(Finalist in 2016, 2013, 2011, 2010, 2009, and 2008)

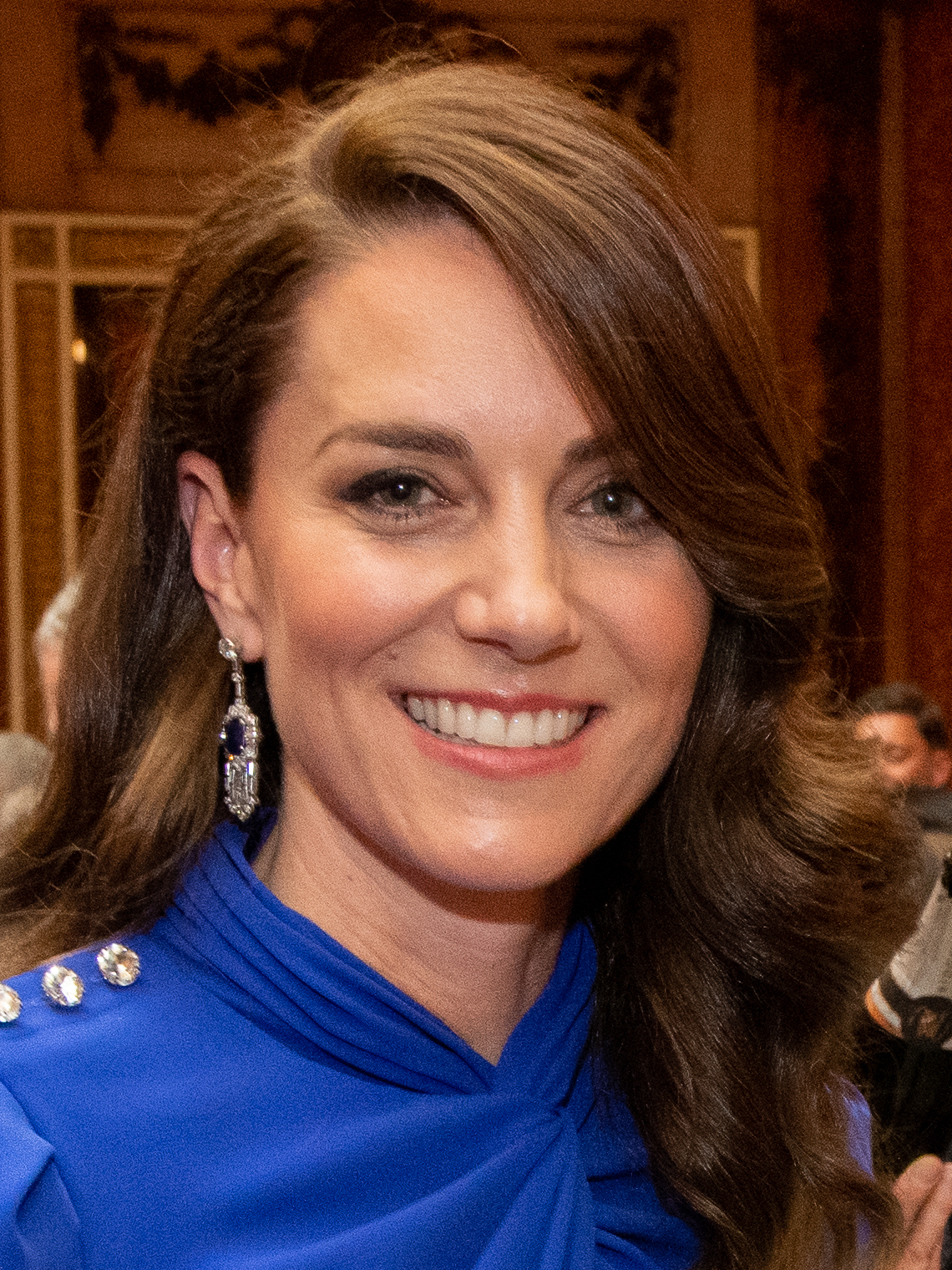
Catherine, Princess of Wales
2013, 2012, and 2011
(Finalist in 2018)

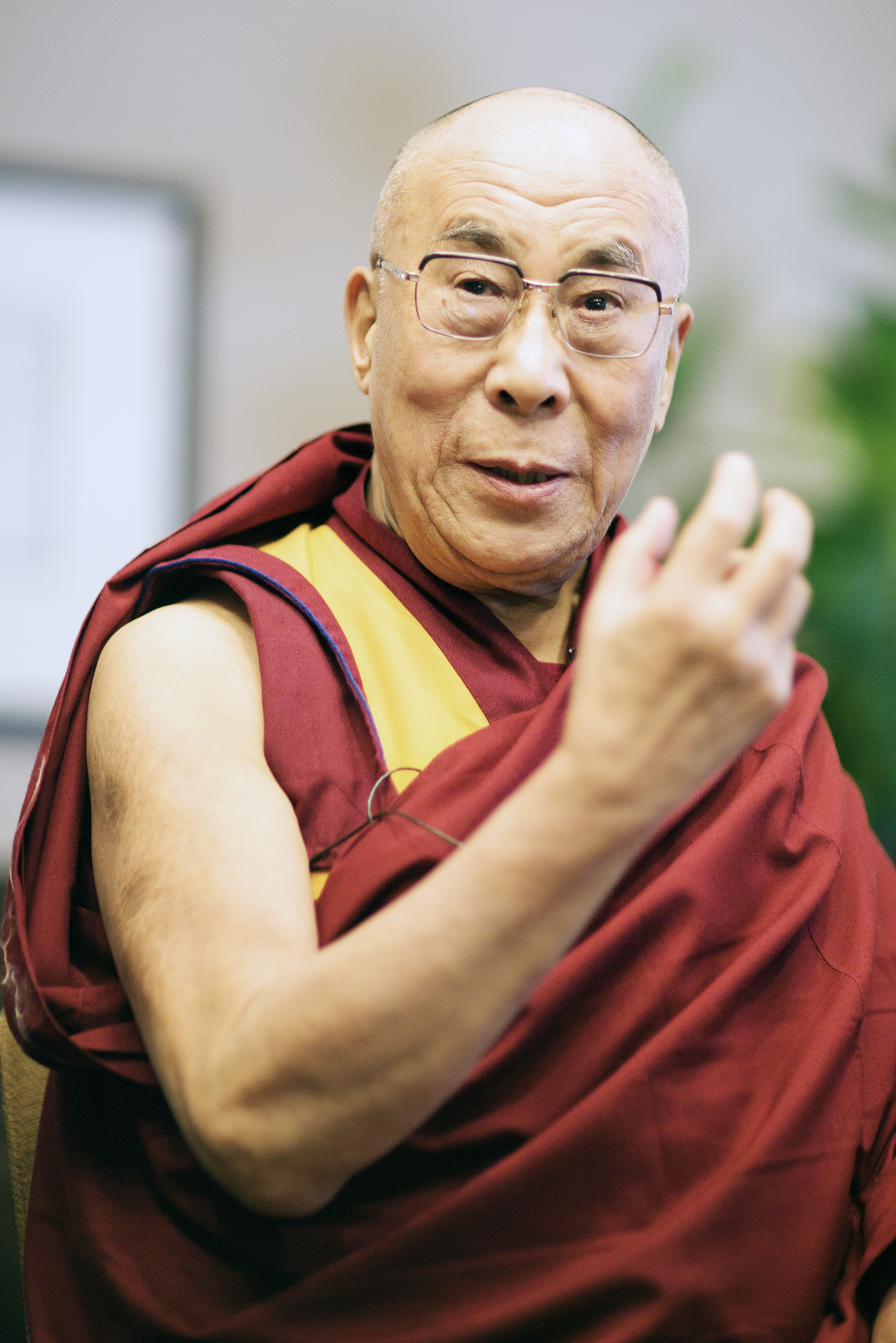
The 14th Dalai Lama, Tenzin Gyatso
2008, 2005, and 2004
(Finalist in 2015 and 2009)

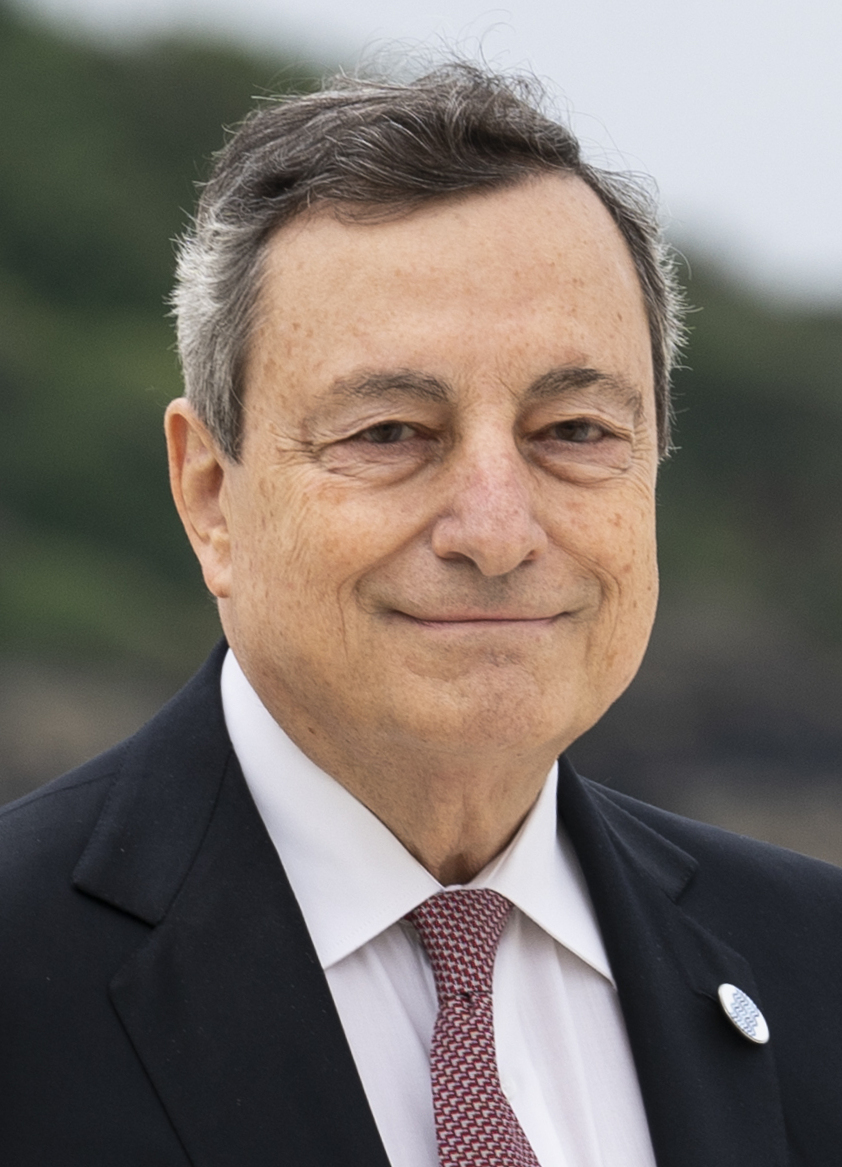
Mario Draghi
2021, 2013, and 2012

Kamala Harris
2021, 2020, and 2013
(Finalist in 2023, 2022, 2019, 2017, 2012, and 2011)

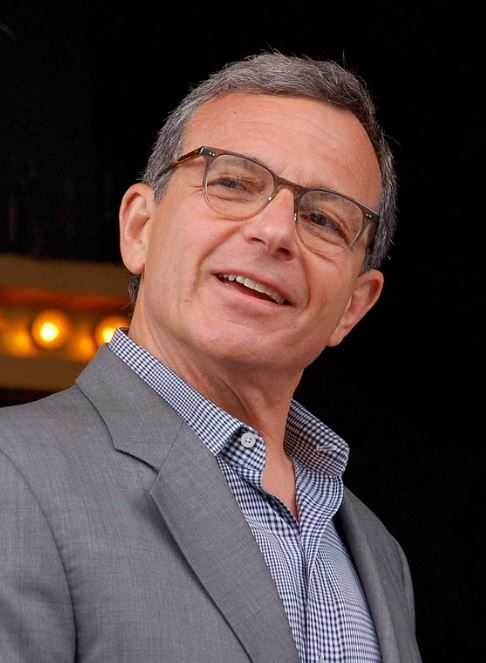
Bob Iger
2023, 2019, and 2015
(Finalist in 2018)

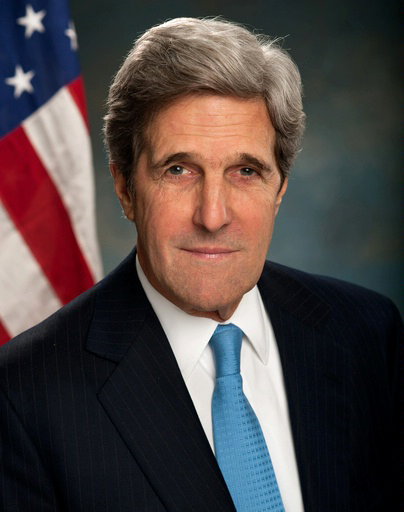
John Kerry
2016, 2014, and 2004
(Finalist in 2015 and 2013)

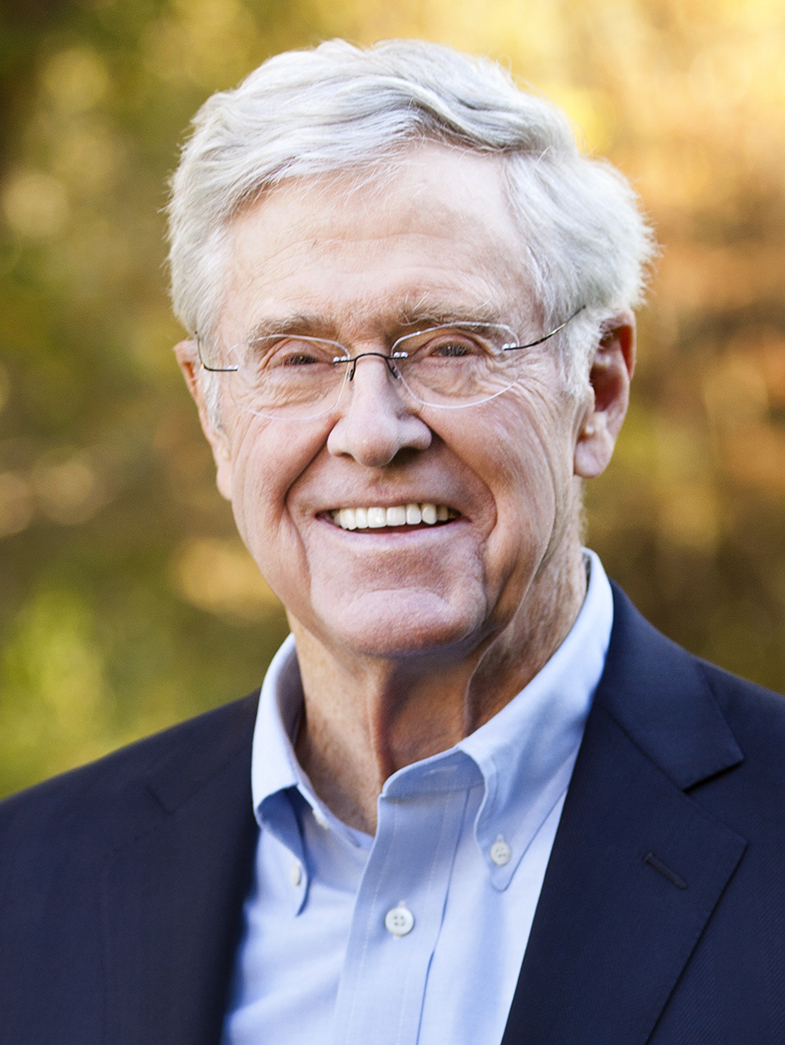
Charles Koch
2015, 2014, and 2011
(Finalist in 2016 and 2012)
(shared with brother David at all times)

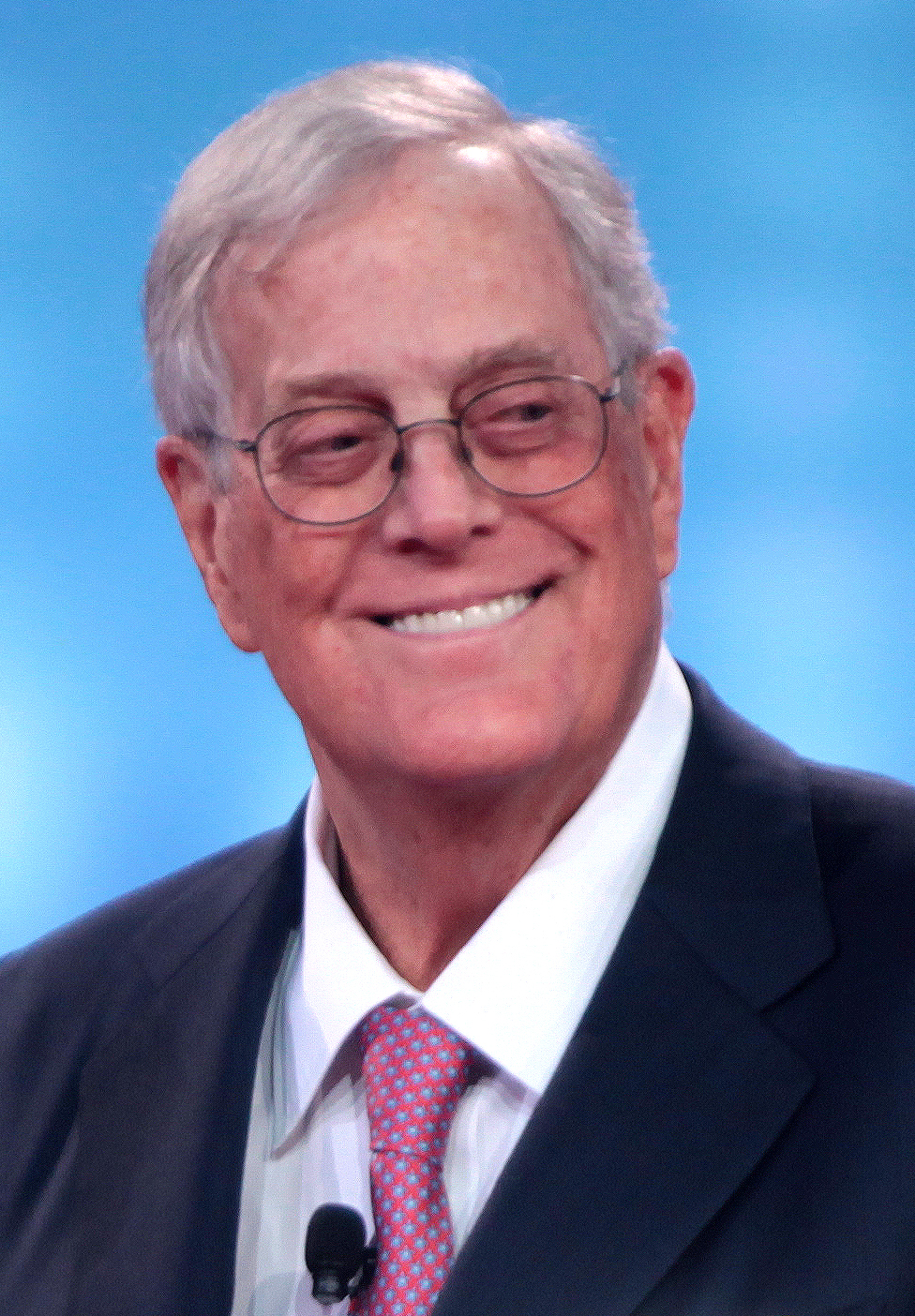
David Koch
2015, 2014, and 2011
(Finalist in 2016 and 2012)
(shared with brother Charles at all times)

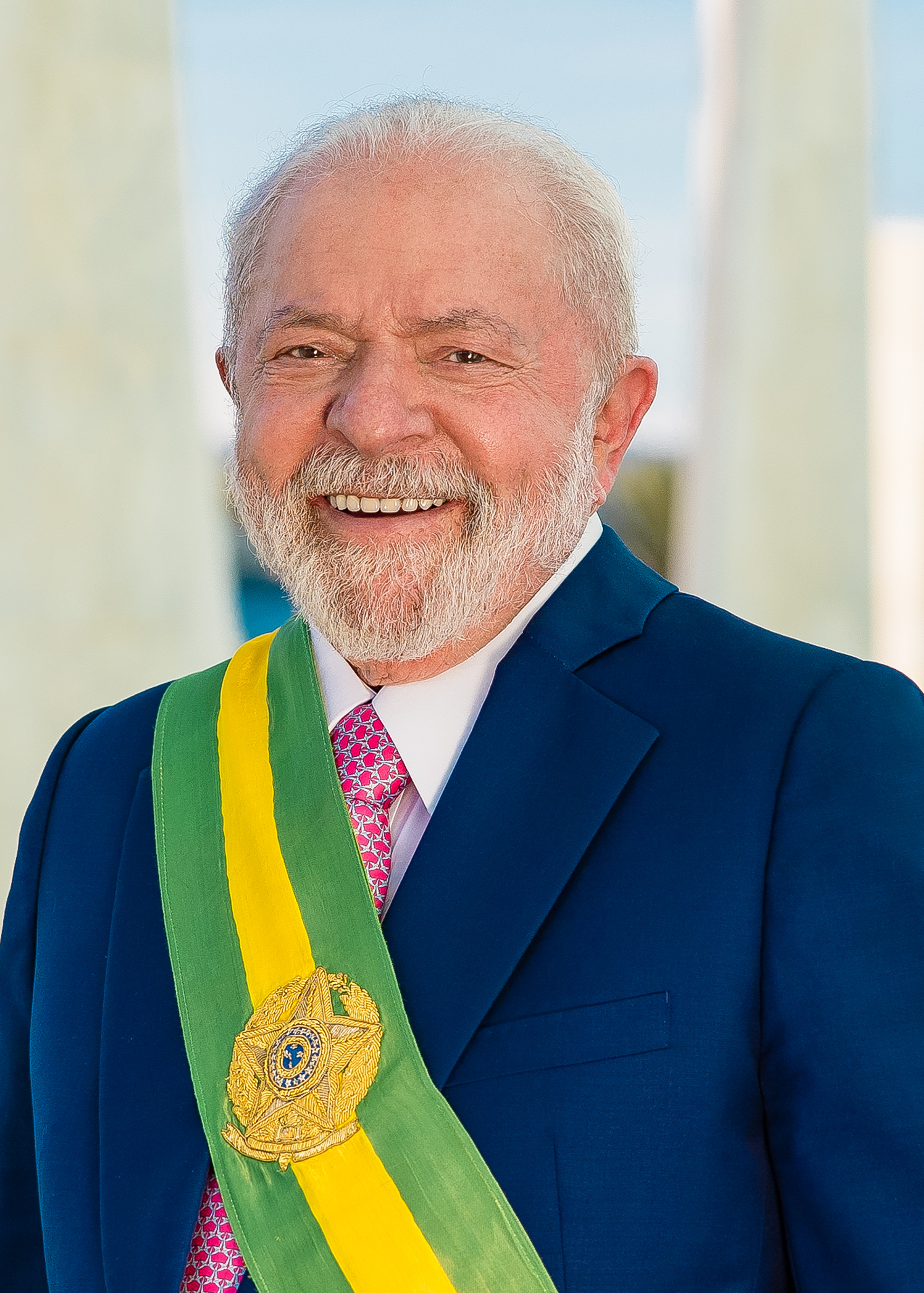
Luiz Inácio Lula da Silva
2023, 2010, and 2004

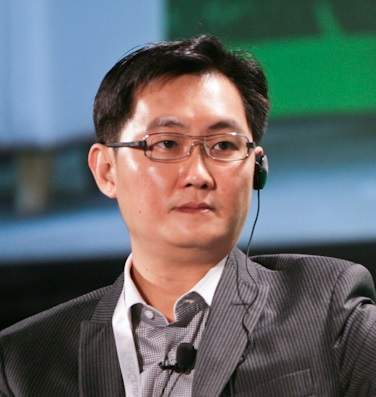
Ma Huateng
2018, 2014, and 2007
(Finalist in 2022, 2021, and 2019)

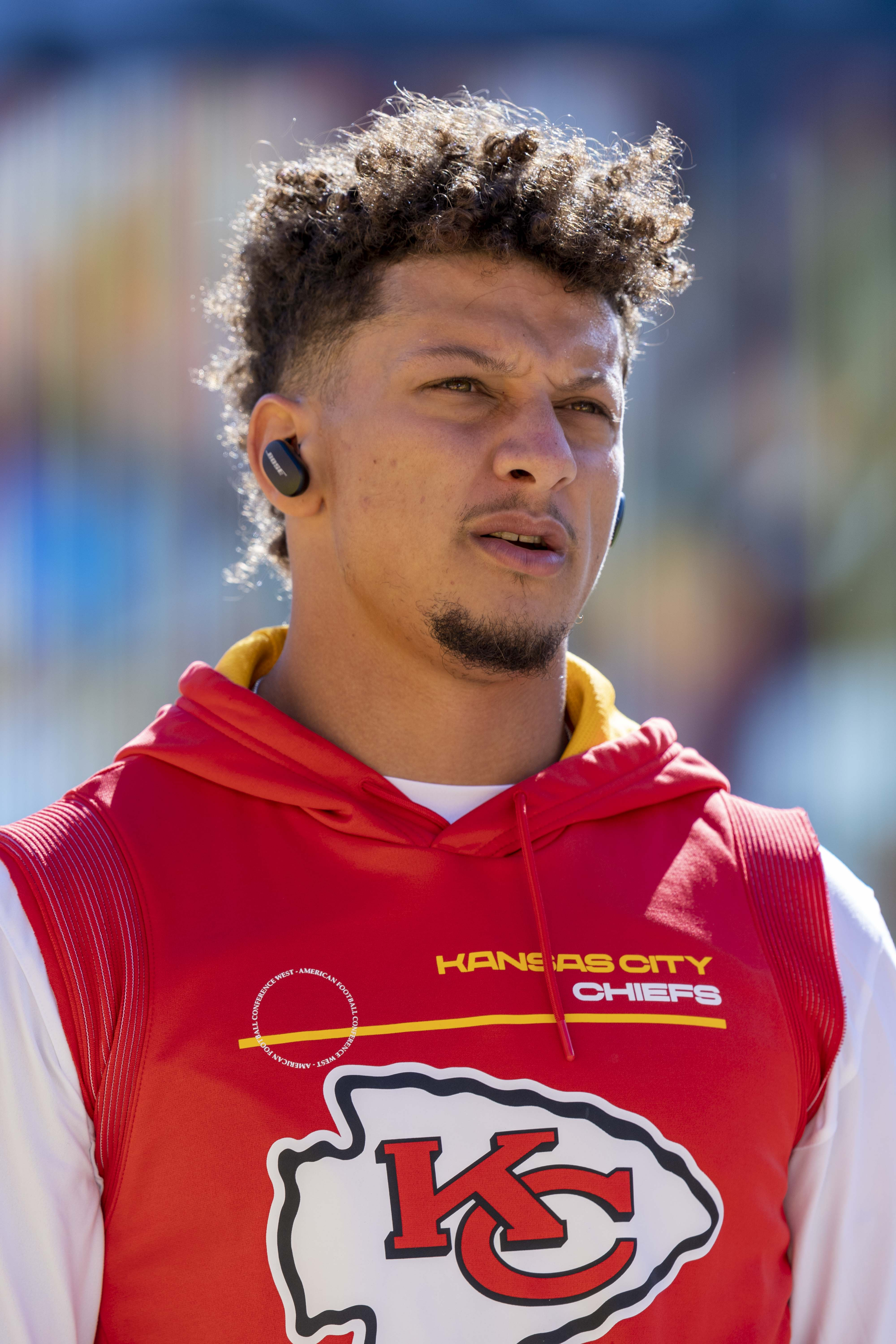
Patrick Mahomes
2024, 2023, 2020
(Finalist in 2019)

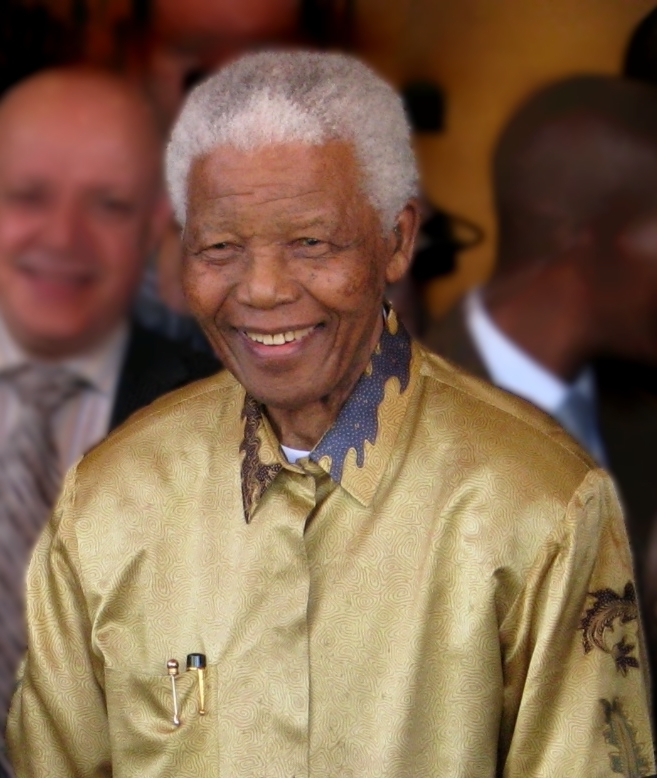
Nelson Mandela
2005, 2004, and the 20th century
(Finalist in 2008 and 2007)

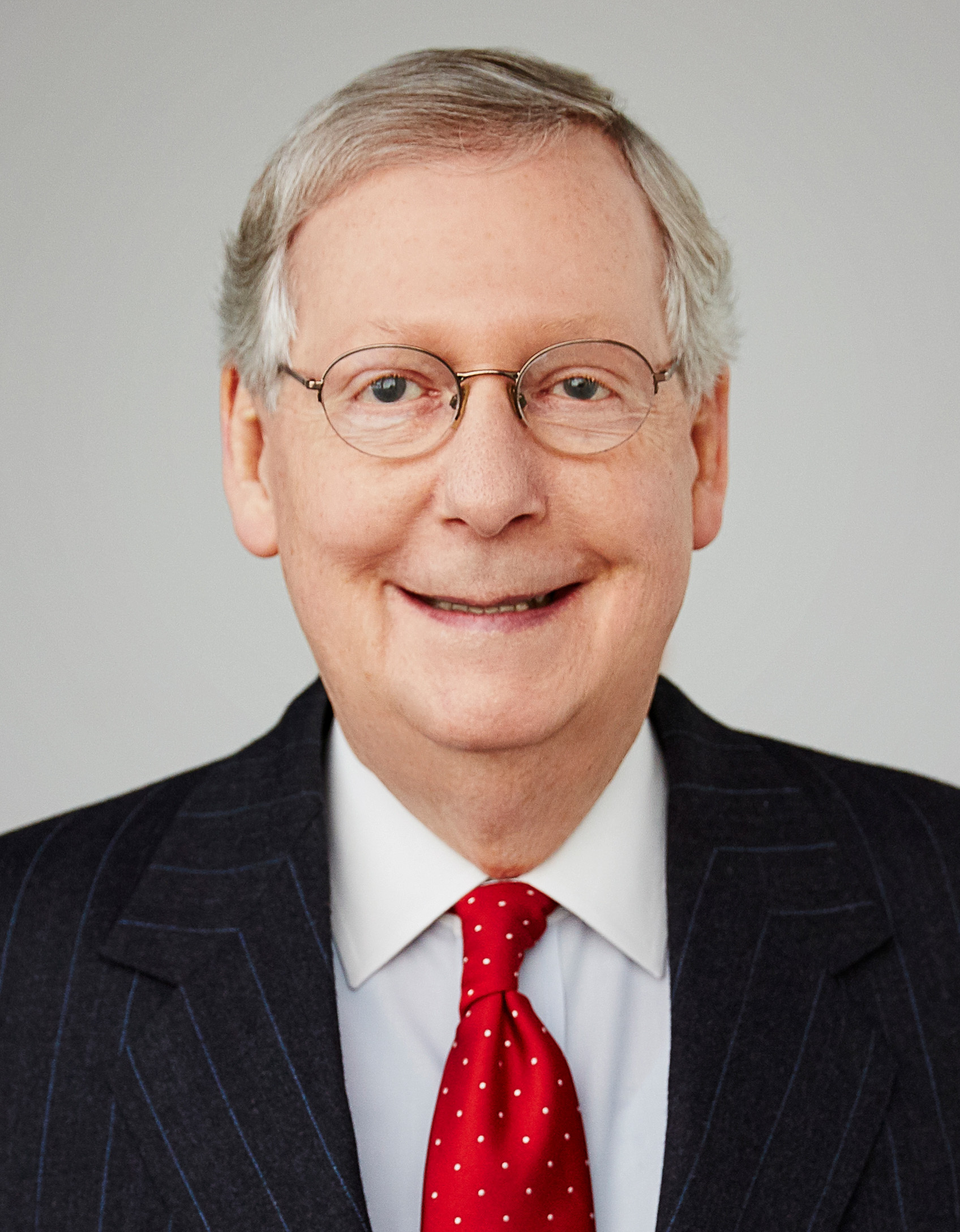
Mitch McConnell
2023, 2019, and 2015
(Finalist in 2022, 2021, and 2014)

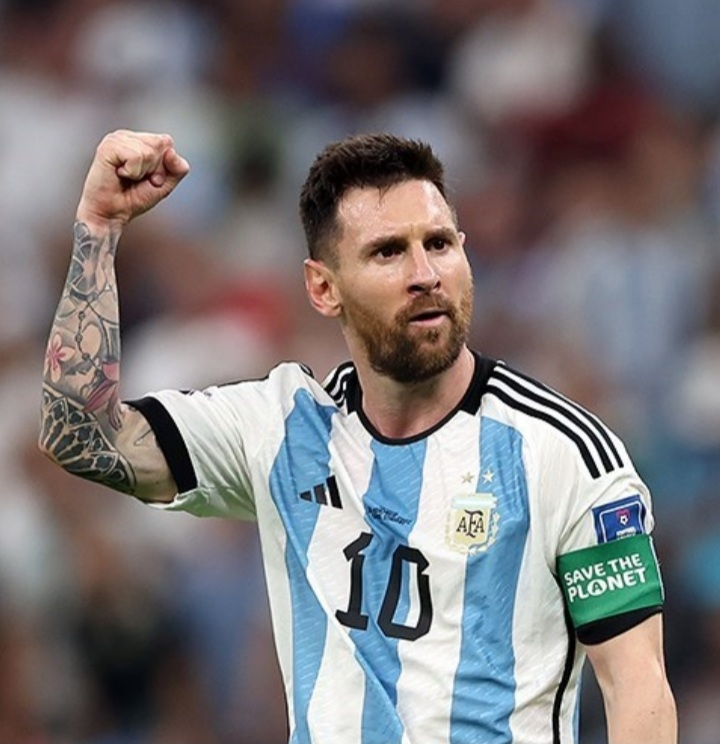
Lionel Messi
2023, 2012, and 2011
(Finalist in 2022, 2021, and 2016)

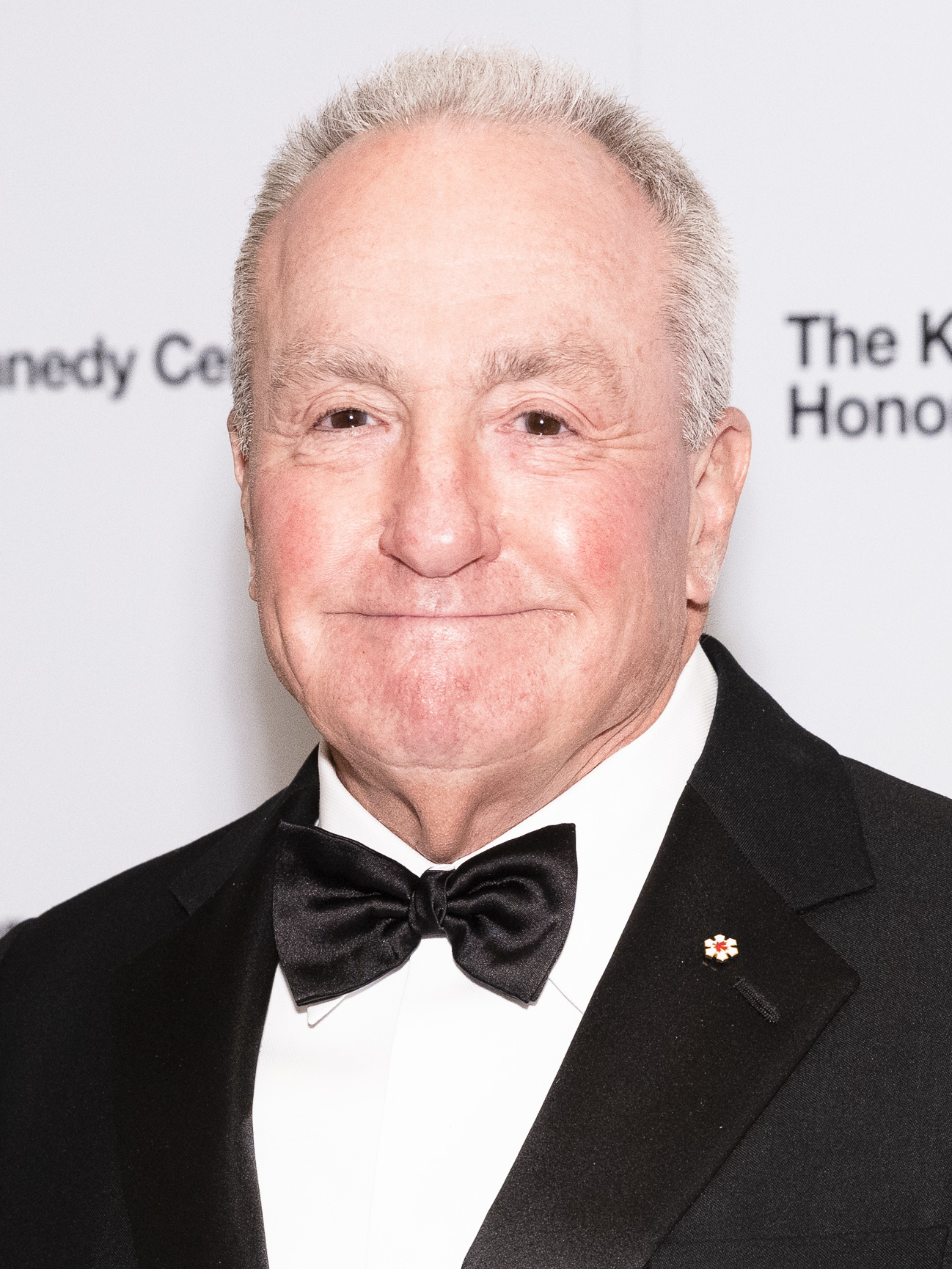
Lorne Michaels
2025, 2015, and 2008

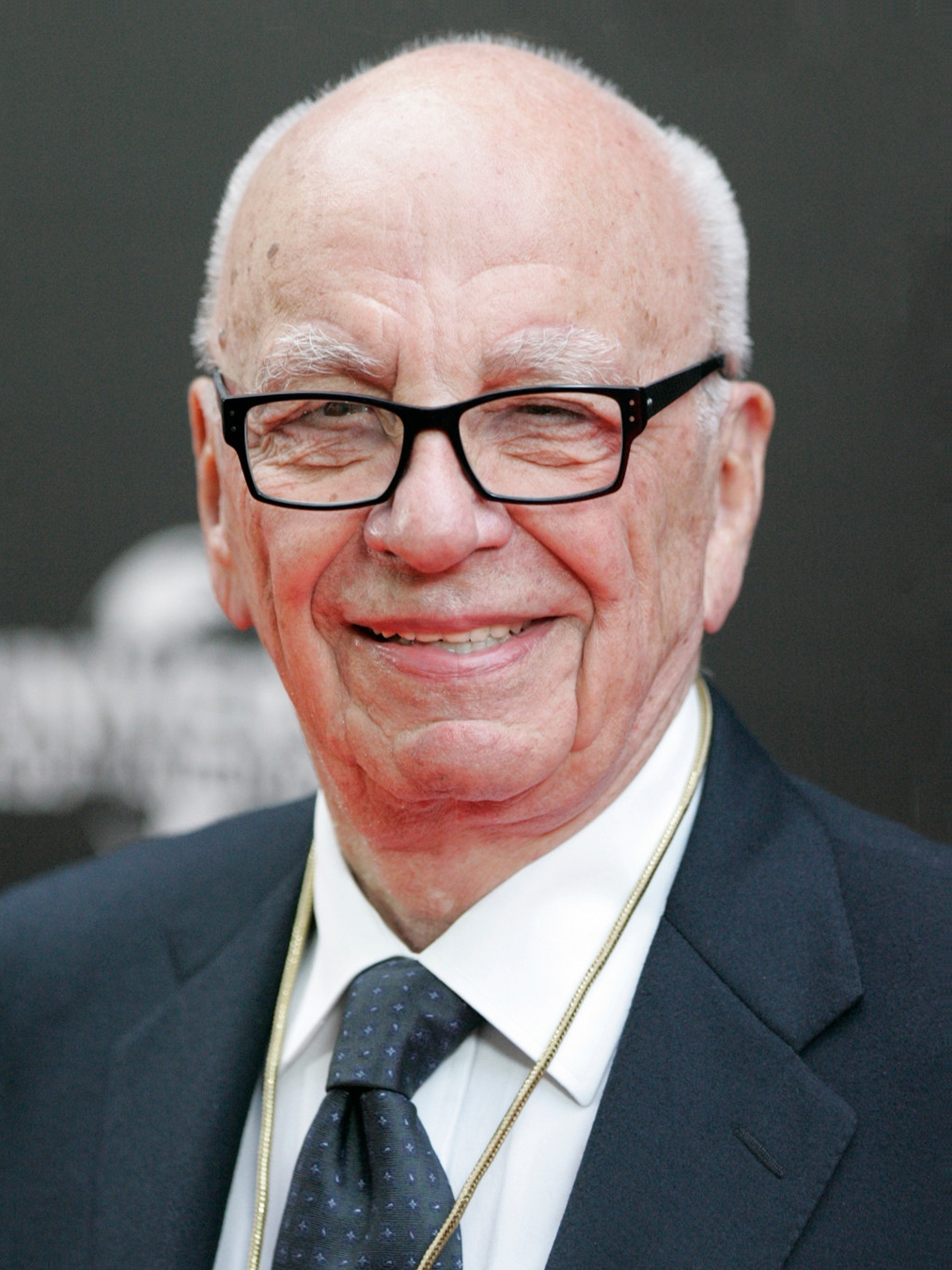
Rupert Murdoch
2008, 2005, and 2004
(Finalist in 2012, 2010, and 2009)

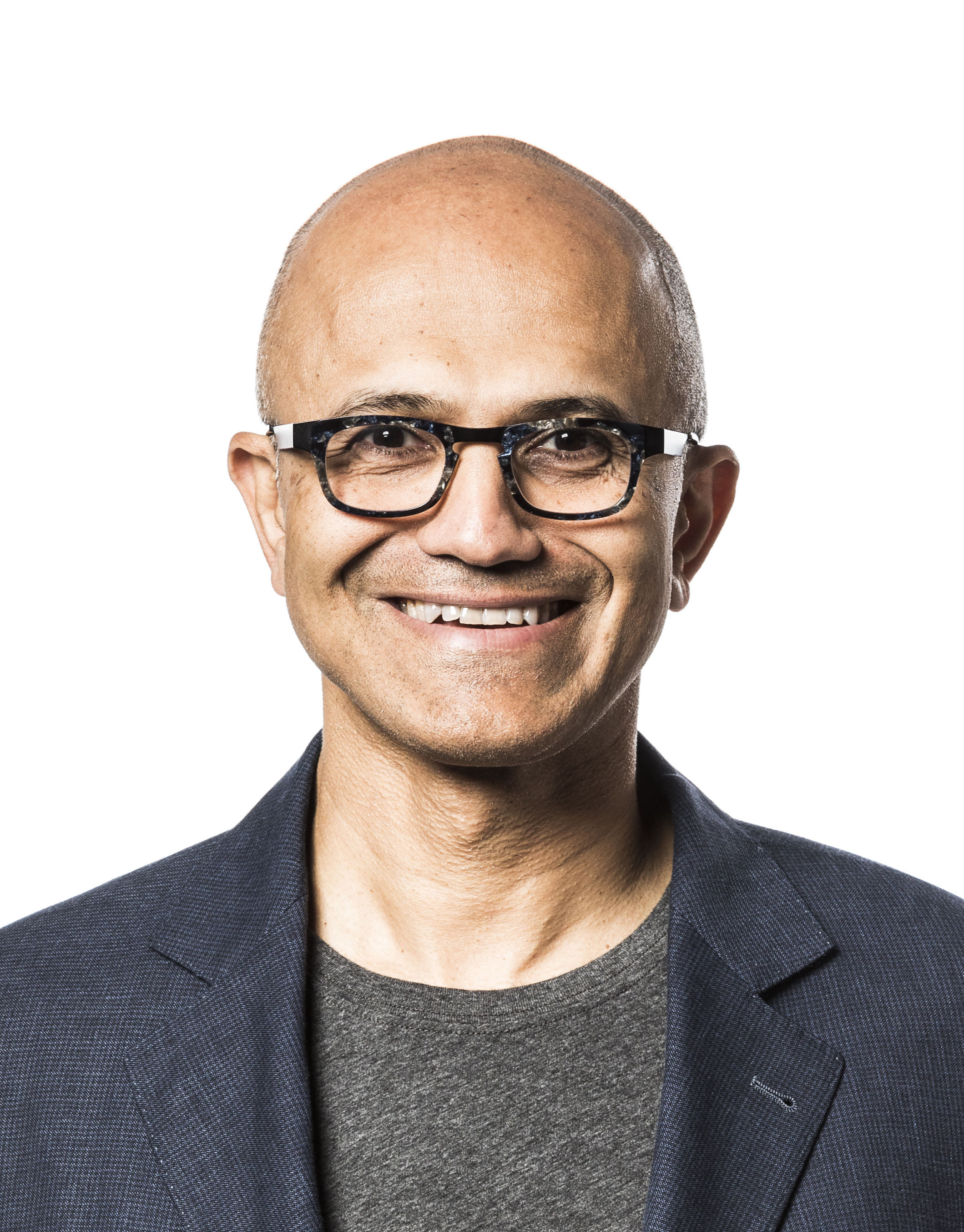
Satya Nadella
2024, 2018, and 2015
(Finalist in 2023, 2022, 2021, 2020, 2019, 2017, 2016, and 2014)

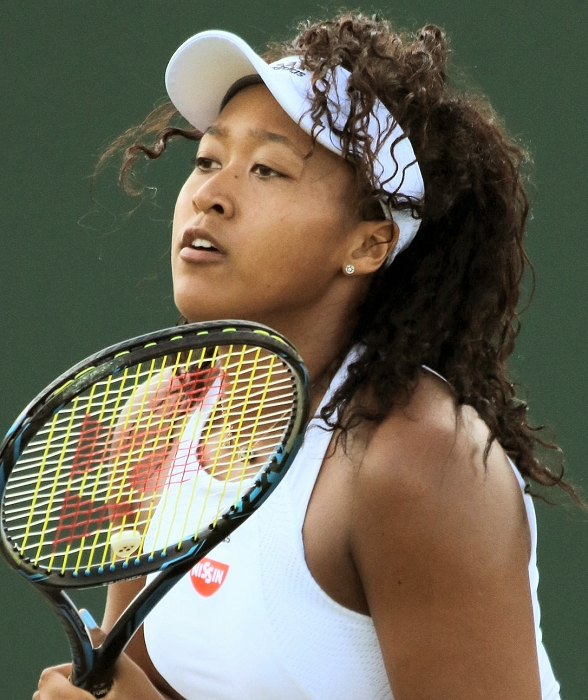
Naomi Osaka
2021, 2020, and 2019

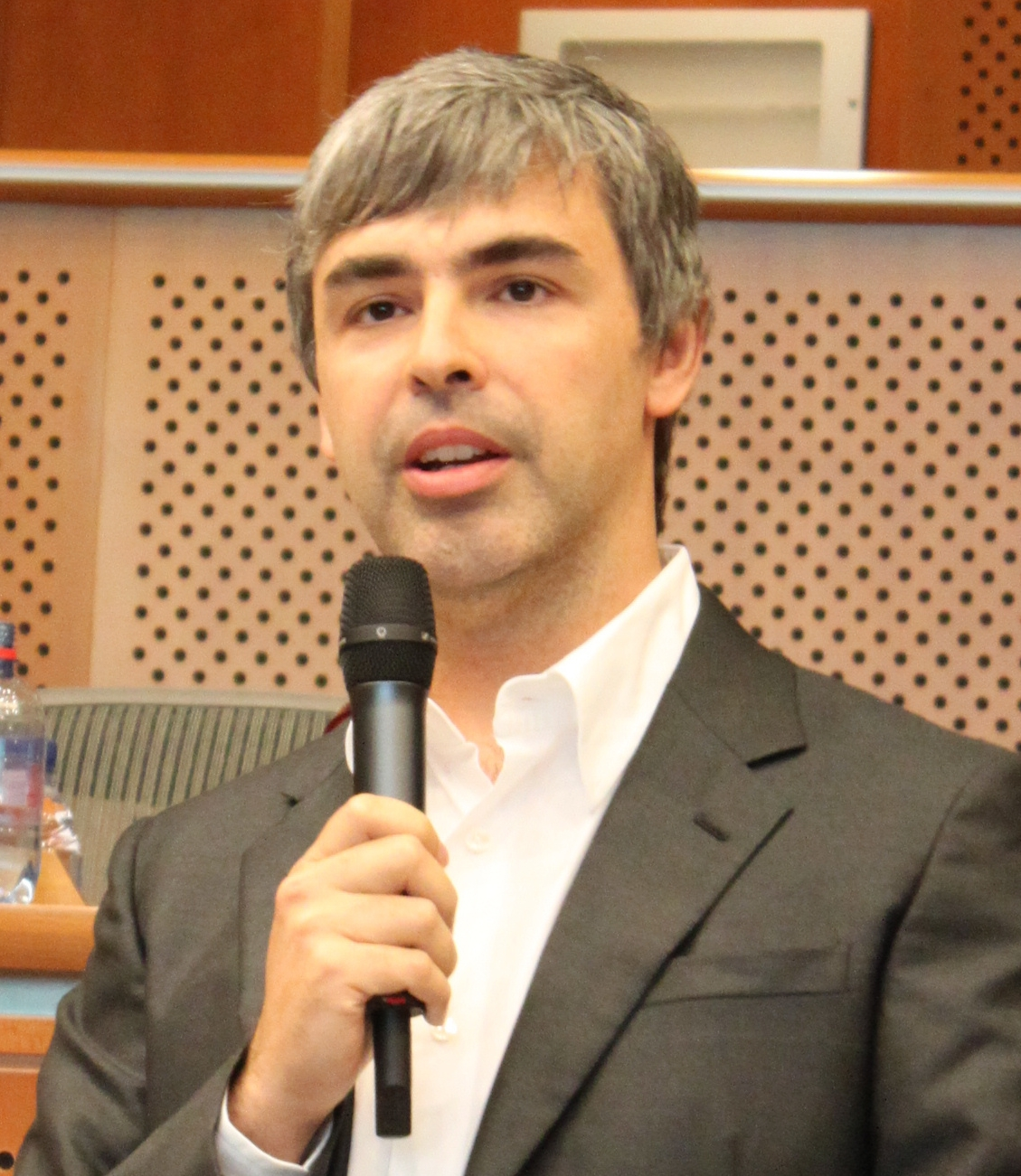
Larry Page
2011, 2005, and 2004
(Finalist in 2014, 2012, and 2008)

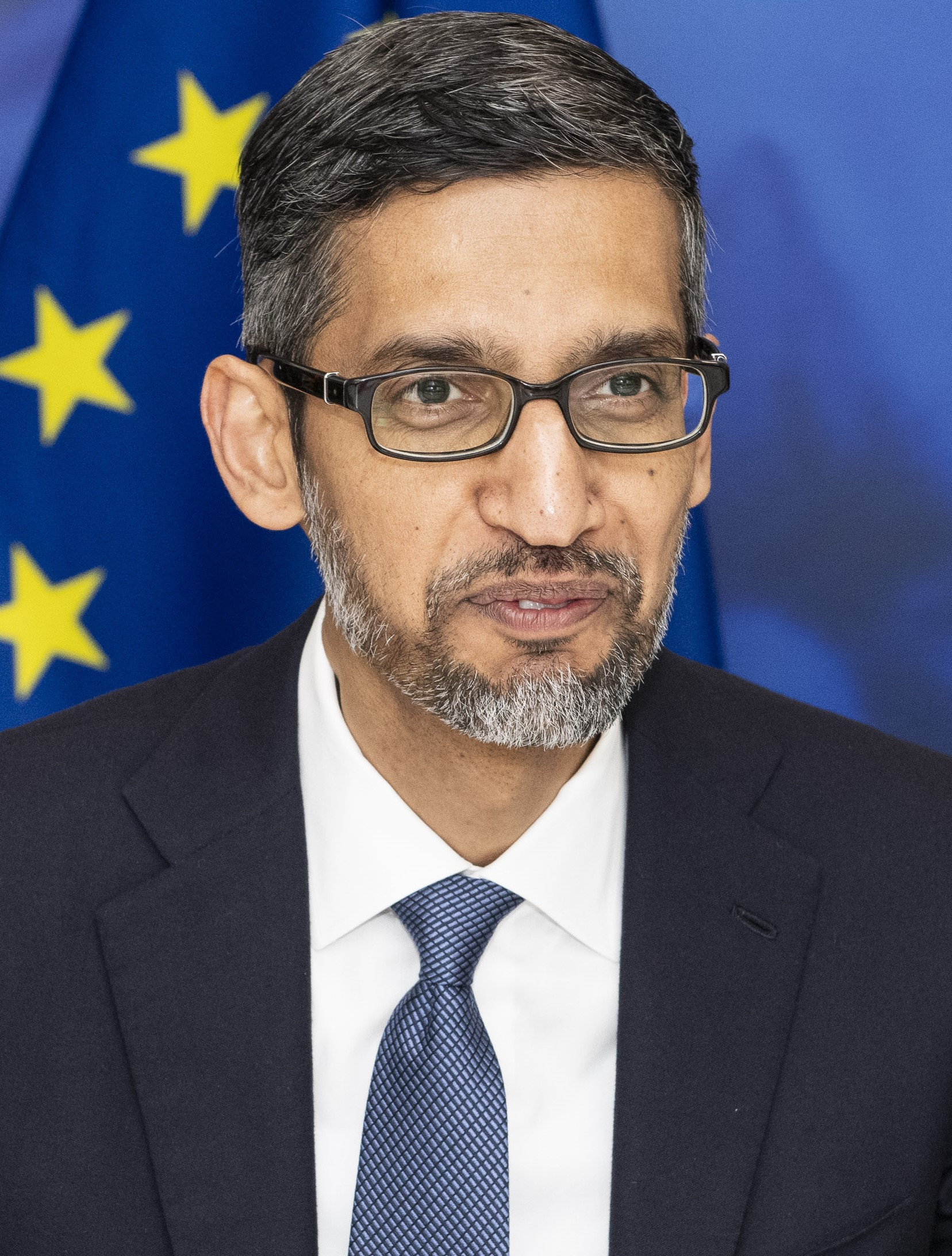
Sundar Pichai
2026, 2020, and 2016
(Finalist in 2023, 2022, and 2021)

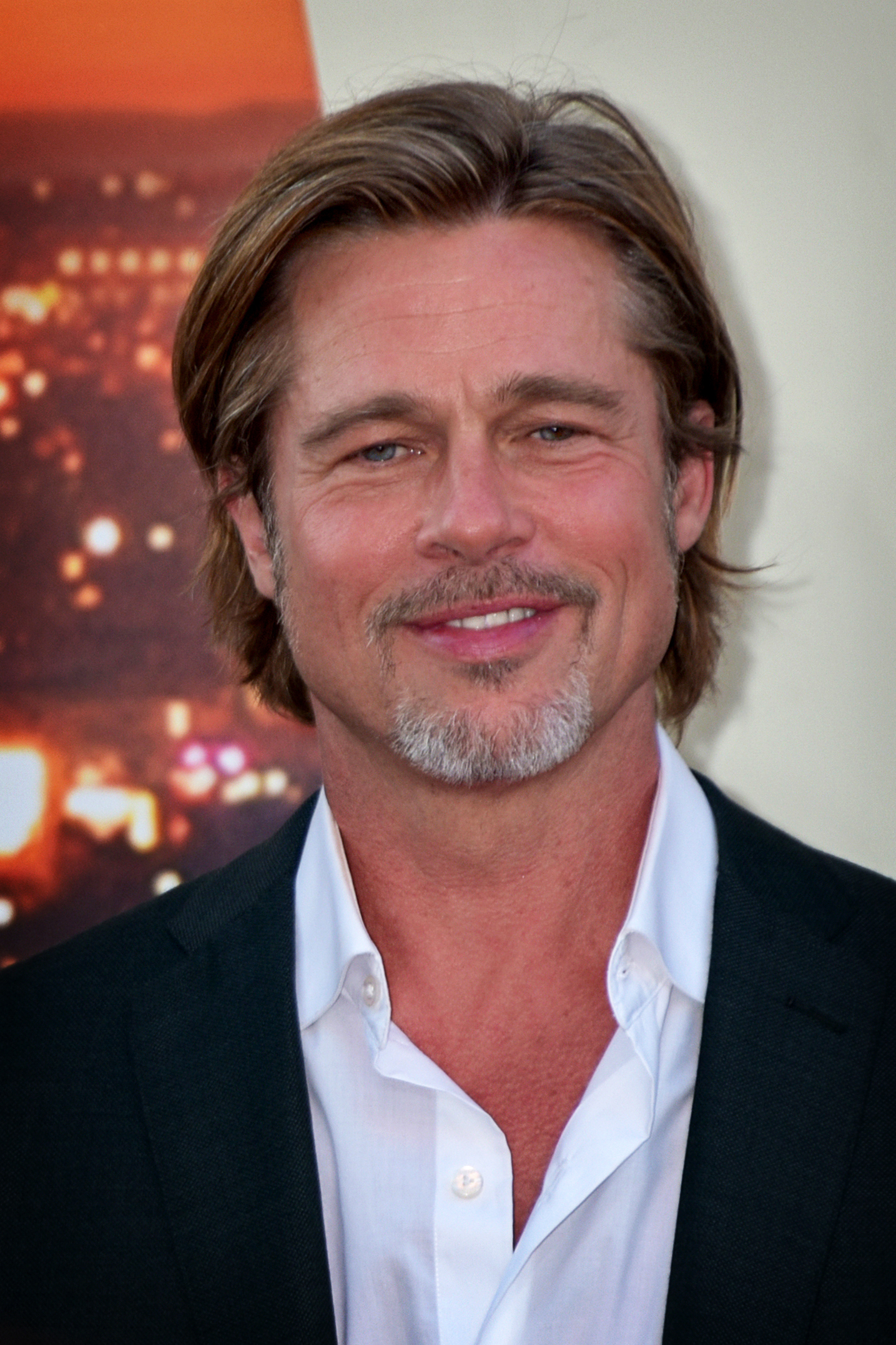
Brad Pitt
2009, 2008, and 2007
(Finalist in 2012 and 2011)

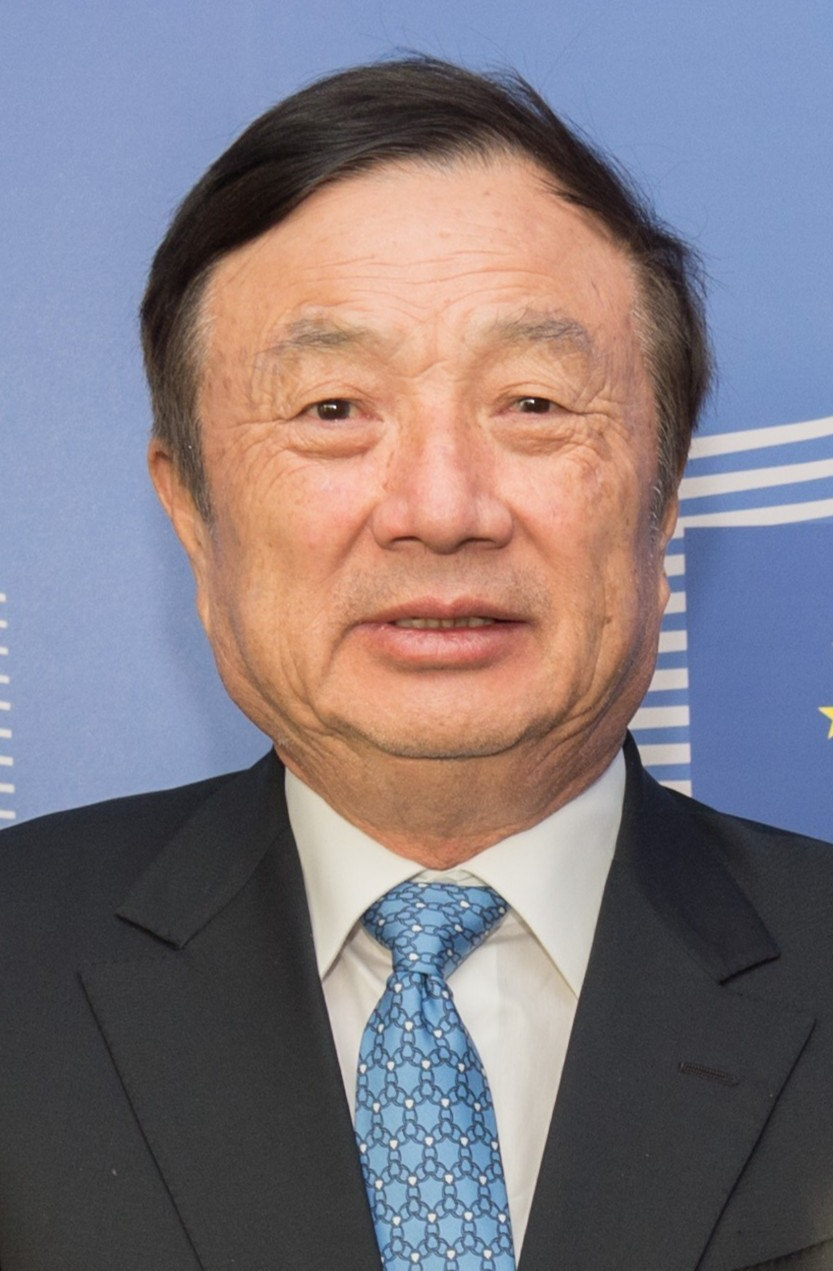
Ren Zhengfei
2019, 2013, and 2005

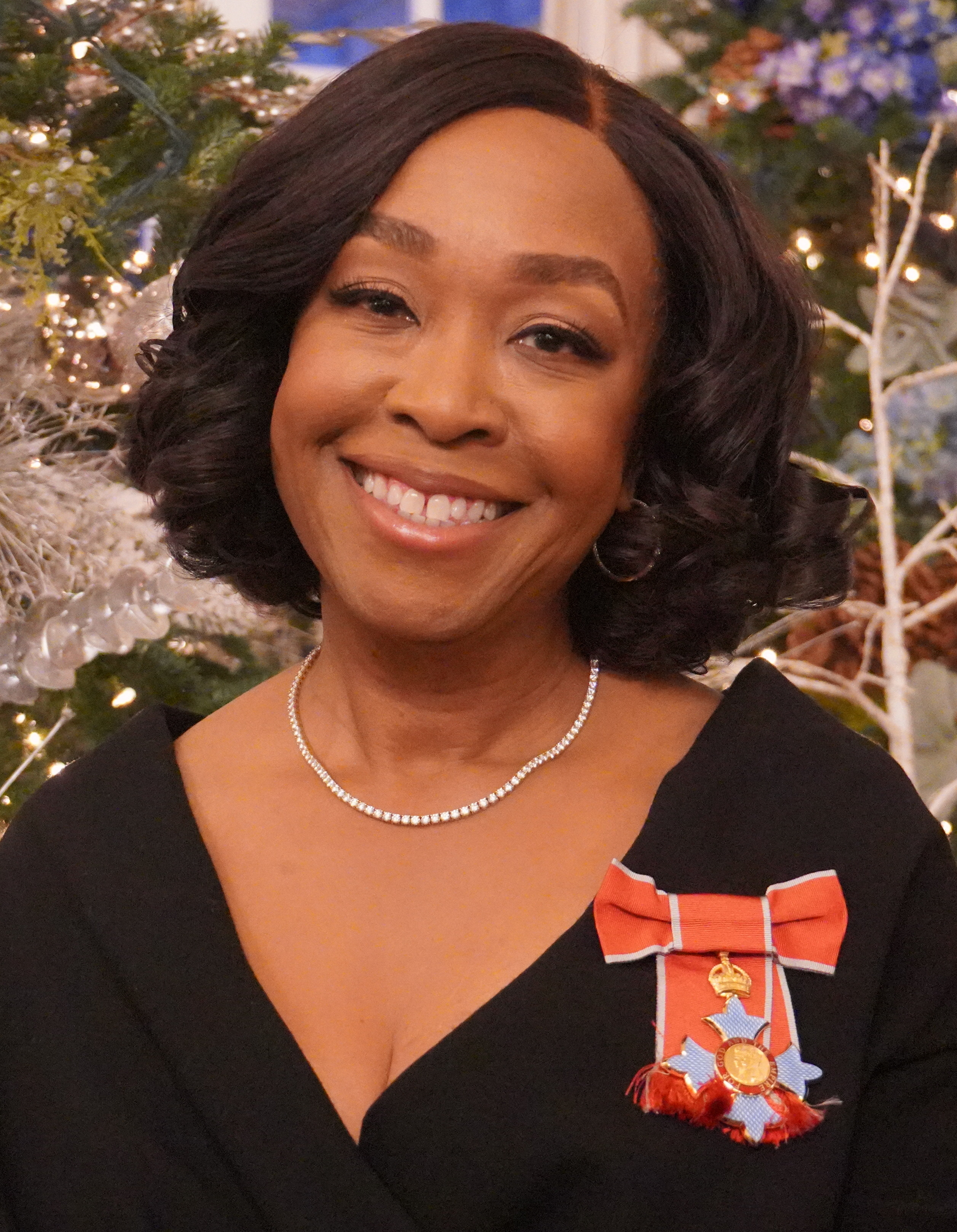
Shonda Rhimes
2021, 2013, and 2007
(Finalist in 2023, 2022, 2016, and 2015)

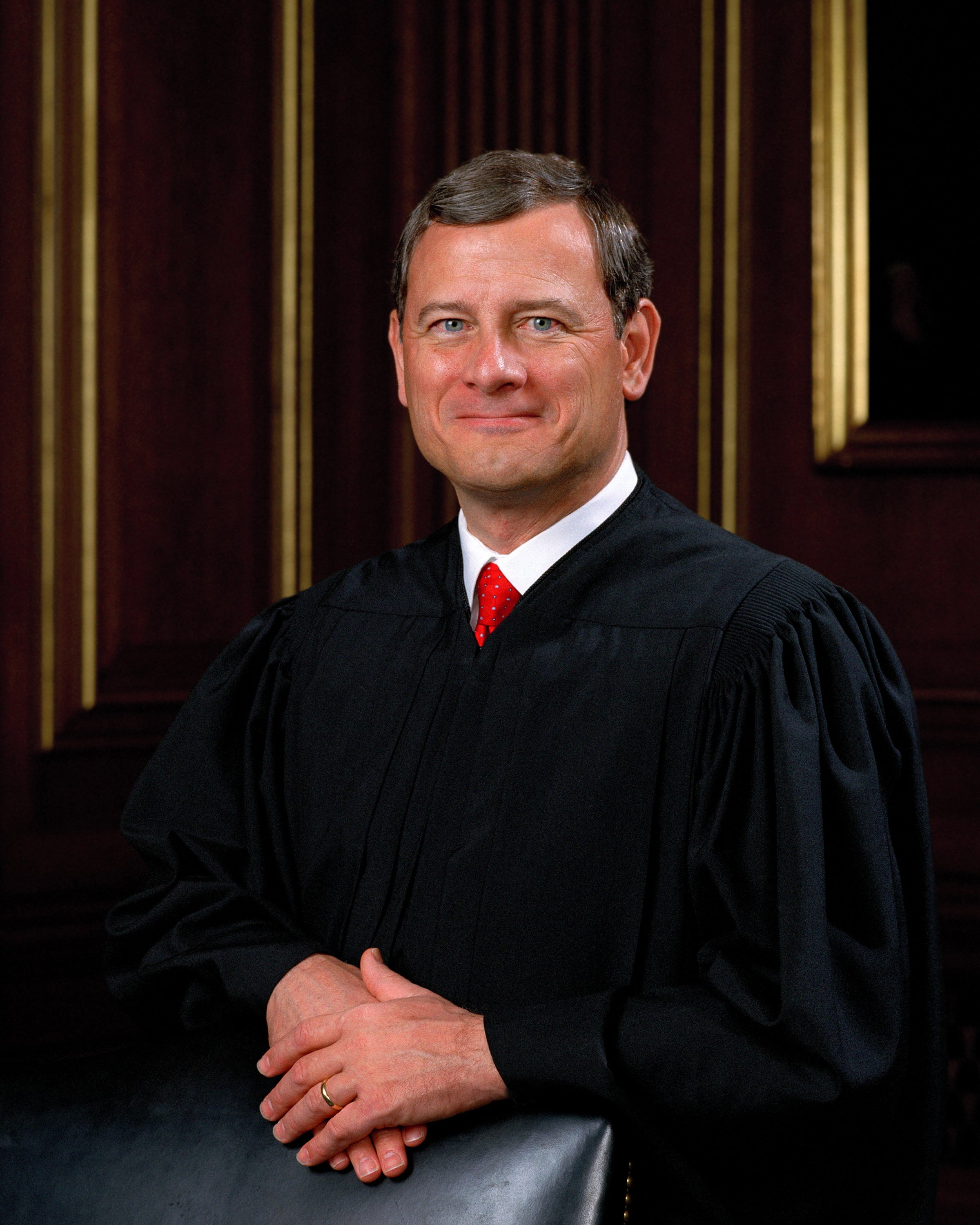
John Roberts
2020, 2007, and 2006
(Finalist in 2015, 2013, 2012, and 2008)

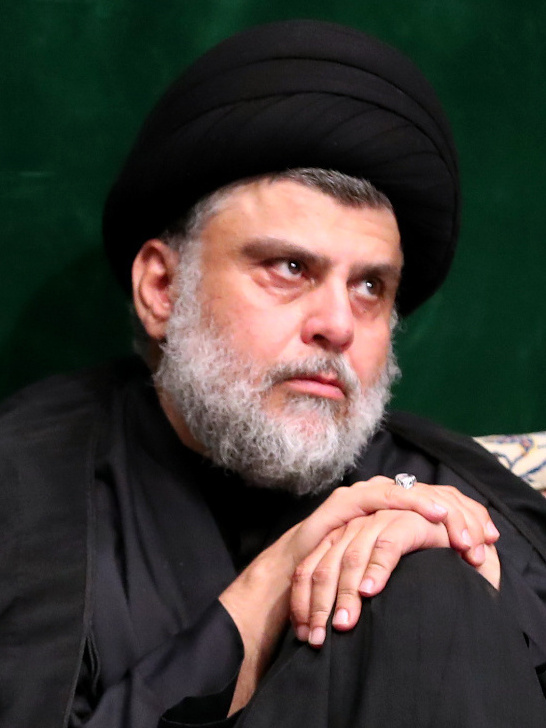
Muqtada al-Sadr
2011, 2008, and 2006
(Finalist in 2009 and 2007)

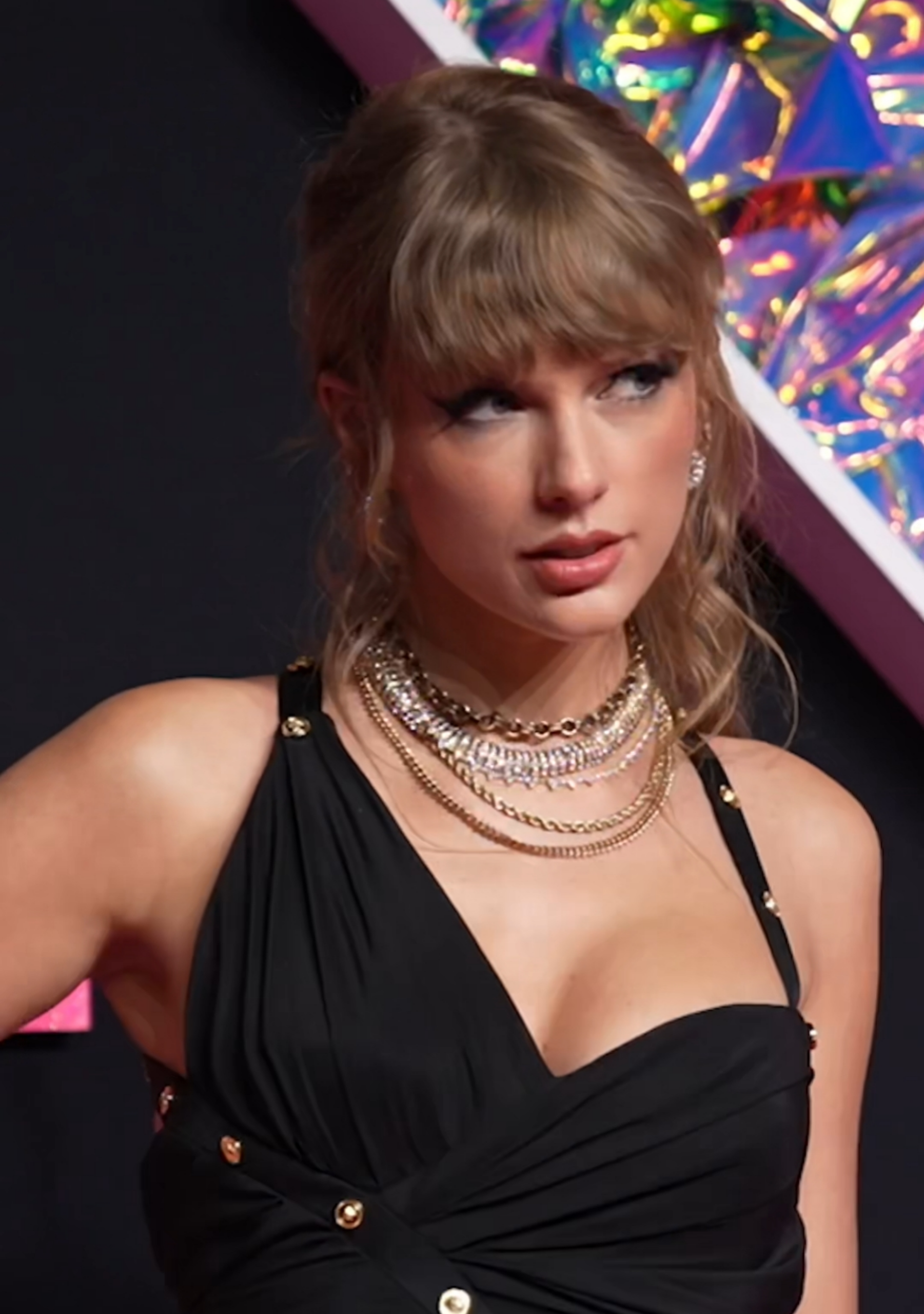
Taylor Swift
2019, 2015, and 2010
(Finalist in 2023, 2022, 2021, 2020, 2016, 2014, and 2009)

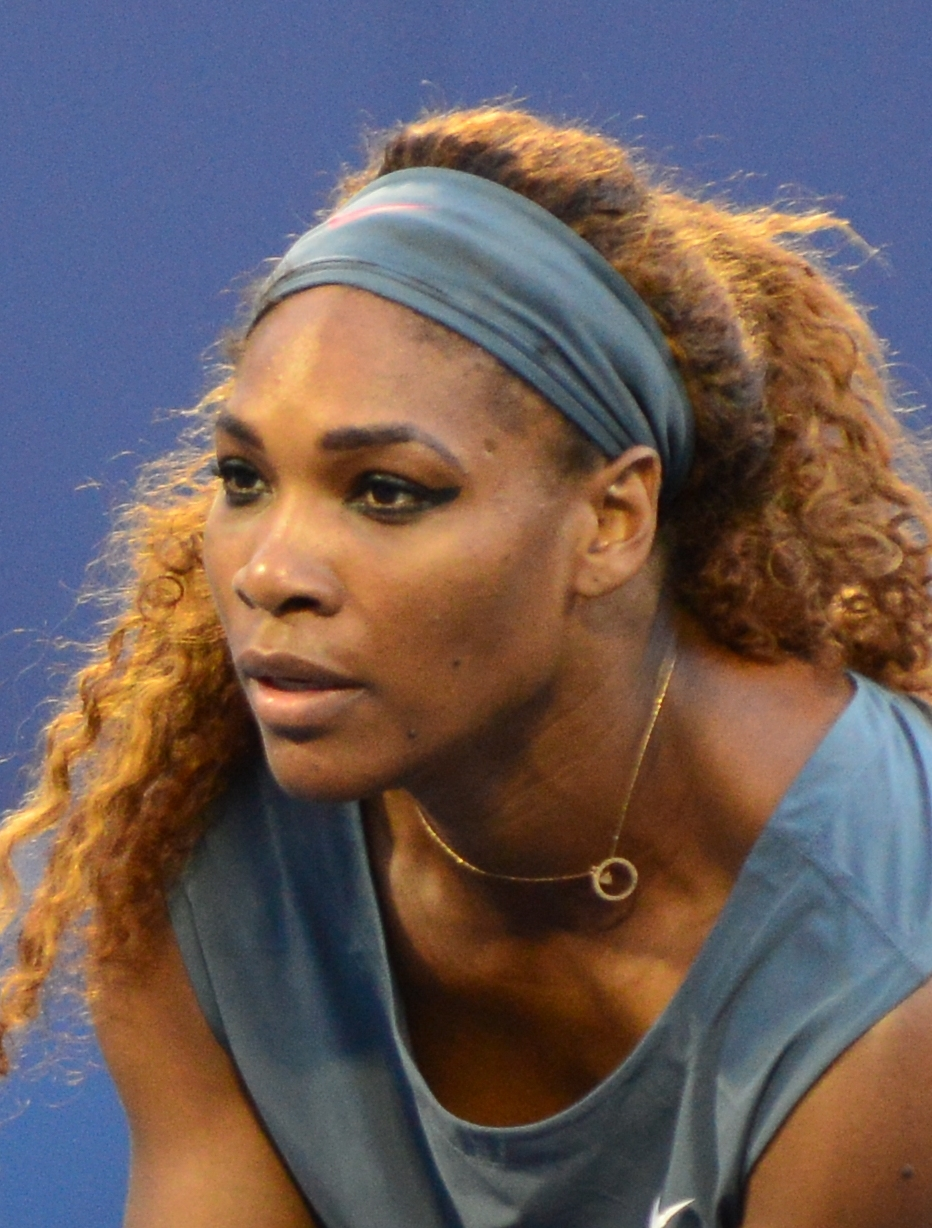
Serena Williams
2025, 2014, and 2010
(Finalist in 2023, 2020, 2019, 2018, 2017, 2016, and 2013)

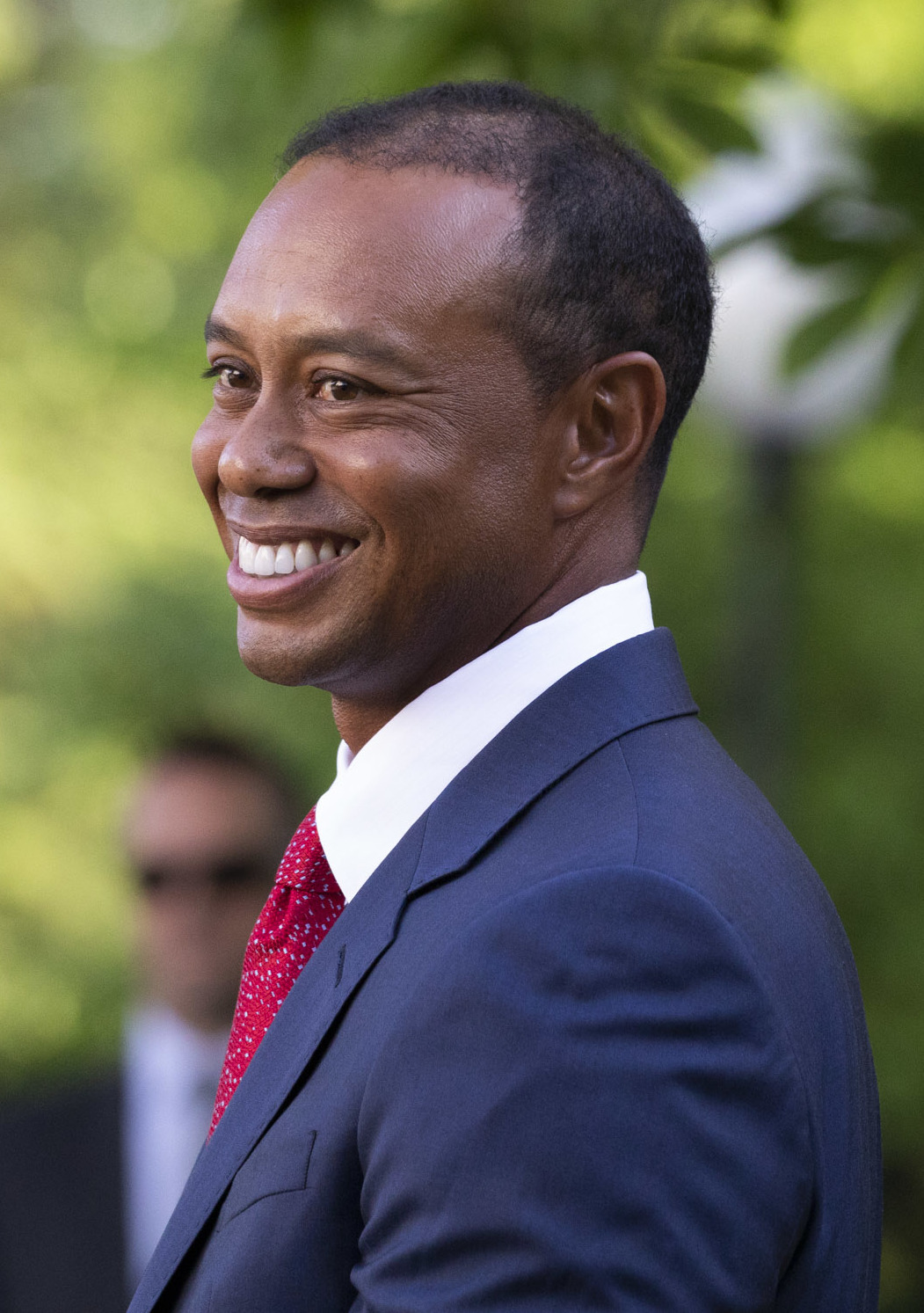
Tiger Woods
2019, 2009, and 2004
(Finalist in 2010, 2008, and 2007)

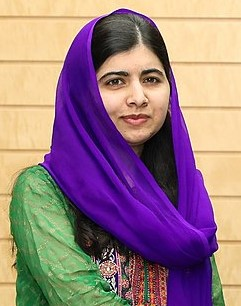
Malala Yousafzai
2015, 2014, and 2013

== Controversies ==
=== Exclusions ===
The exclusion of then-British prime minister Tony Blair from the 2004 list caused mild controversy. Time editor-at-large Michael J. Elliott defended the decision to consistently exclude Blair, saying that "Gerhard Schröder and Jacques Chirac are not there either. This is a worldwide list. There are no Western European political leaders on it because they are not that powerful or influential at this time." The exclusion of then-President of the United States George W. Bush in 2007 generated similar controversy. Former Senator Rick Santorum (R–PA) said on Fox News:

The fact of the matter is, the president of the United States, I don't care who's in that office, is the most powerful man on the face of the Earth and has more influence over various aspects of lives, not just in this country, but around the world. And for Time magazine to dismiss that just shows you how biased and, I would argue, hateful they are.

Adi Ignatius, Time's deputy managing editor who oversaw the list at the time, explained that "any U.S. president has a certain built-in influence ... Bush had actually squandered some of that built-in influence. His position on Iraq has cost him support in his own party. ... To a certain point, he sort of reached a lame-duck status".

=== Inclusions ===
The list has also generated controversy over inclusions. In 2005, conservative commentator Ann Coulter was listed, which led Salon to observe:

When Time magazine named Ann Coulter among its 100 "most influential people" last week, alongside such heavyweights as Ariel Sharon, Bill Clinton, Nelson Mandela, and the Dalai Lama, the choice produced guffaws online. Plugging the issue on Fox News last week, Time executive editor Priscilla Painton insisted it was Coulter's use of "humor" that made her so influential, stopping just short of suggesting that Coulter is the conservative Jon Stewart. But even Fox's Bill O'Reilly wasn't buying it. He pressed Painton: "Do you think people, Americans, listen to Ann Coulter? Do you think she has influence in public opinion?"

Time defended Coulter as a best-selling author whose controversial commentary strongly affected political debates in the United States. Coulter did not, however, make additional appearances on the list.

=== Mistakes ===
In February 2016, Time included the male British author Evelyn Waugh on its "100 Most Read Female Writers in College Classes" list, generating media attention and concerns regarding fact-checking at the magazine. Time later issued a retraction. In a BBC interview with Justin Webb, Oxford professor Valentine Cunningham said the mistake was "a piece of profound ignorance on the part of Time magazine".

== Other Time lists ==
=== Next Generation Leaders ===
Since 2014, in partnership with Rolex, Time has published a class of young pioneers "in politics, business, culture, science and sports" who are reshaping the world around them. It is, per the magazine's editor-in-chief Edward Felsenthal, "an opportunity to elevate" the trailblazers "who are building a better future". Included in the 2022 list was Lina Abu Akleh, a human rights advocate who is the niece of Shireen Abu Akleh, a journalist killed by Israeli soldiers.

=== The 25 Most Influential People on the Internet ===
From 2015 to 2019, Time also published a list titled "The 25 Most Influential People on the Internet", which featured people whose influence and dominance may have changed Internet culture; who have support, position, and prominence in various sections of social media; or who use and/or rely on the Internet as a platform for change. People who have been listed range from political figures, such as Donald Trump and Alexandria Ocasio-Cortez, to teenage YouTubers, such as JoJo Siwa and Emma Chamberlain.

Others who have been listed include Lil Nas X, whose debut hit broke the record for most weeks spent atop the Billboard Hot 100 after being created and distributed on the Internet, and actress and presenter Jameela Jamil, who is known widely beyond her profession for her online activism.

=== Time 100 Next list ===
In 2019, Time began publishing the Time 100 Next list, which "spotlights 100 rising stars who are shaping the future of business, entertainment, sports, politics, science, health and more". It is considered an expansion of the current Time 100 list. Although the list has no explicit age cap, it is more focused on up-and-coming figures and "rising stars". The Next list features profiles written by established Time 100 alumni.

=== Time 100 Women of the Year ===
In 2019, Time created 89 new covers to celebrate women of the year starting from 1920. The covers also include women who were originally honored as Person of the Year such as first lady Soong Mei-ling, as well as women who were retroactively honored for the first time such as pilot Amelia Earhart and researcher Tu Youyou.

=== Time 100 Most Influential Companies ===
In 2021, Time solicited company nominations from industry and journalistic sources, which were then evaluated on relevance, impact, innovation, leadership, ambition and success. The top 100 were compiled into the Time 100 Most Influential Companies list, which included well-known companies such as GM, Tesla, Volkswagen Group, Facebook, Google, Moderna, UPS, and Netflix. Along with the list, Time launched Time Business.

=== Time 100 Climate ===
In 2023, Time launched the Time 100 Climate list, which ranked the most influential climate action leaders based on recent and measurable achievements. Its first edition included American singer Billie Eilish, United Steelworkers executive Roxanne Brown, World Bank president Ajay Banga, DSM-Firmenich vice-president Mark van Nieuwland, and indigenous rights activist Nemonte Nenquimo.

=== Time 100 AI ===
In 2023, Time launched the Time 100 AI list, featuring the 100 most influential people in artificial intelligence. The first edition included business leaders such as Anthropic CEO and president Dario and Daniela Amodei, along with writers and academics including science fiction author Ted Chiang, researcher and policy advisor Alondra Nelson, and neural network pioneer Geoffrey Hinton, amongst others.

=== Time 100 Health ===
In 2024, Time launched the Time 100 Health list, which recognizes the 100 most influential people in health. The list included French President Emmanuel Macron, U.S. President Jimmy Carter, and several other luminaries.

=== Time 100 Philanthropy ===
In 2025, Time launched the Time 100 Philanthropy list, which recognizes the 100 most influential people in the field of philanthropy.

=== Time 100 Creators ===
In 2025, Time launched the Time 100 Creators list, which features the 100 most influential digital content creators.

=== Time 100 Sports ===
In 2026, Time launched the Time 100 Sports list, which features the 100 most influential people in sports.

== See also ==
- Time Person of the Year
- Time 100: The Most Important People of the Century
- Forbes list of the World's Most Powerful People
- Forbes list of the 100 World's Most Powerful Women
- Met Gala
