= Mayoral elections in Springfield, Massachusetts =

Elections are currently held every four years to elect the mayor of Springfield, Massachusetts.

Before 1961, mayoral elections were partisan. Starting in 1961, they have been nonpartisan.

Terms had, originally, been for a length of a single year, but were later extended to two years. Starting with the 2011 mayoral election, terms were extended further to four years.

== 1933 ==
In 1933, Henry Martens, a Republican was elected mayor.

== 1935 ==
In 1935, Henry Martens, a Republican was reelected.

== 1937 ==
In 1937, Roger Putnam, a Democrat was elected mayor.

== 1939 ==
In 1939, Roger Putnam, a Democrat was reelected to a second term.

== 1941 ==
In 1941, Roger Putnam, a Democrat was reelected to a third term.

== 1943 ==
In 1943, Acting Mayor J. Albin Anderson Jr., a Republican, won election to a full mayoral term.

== 1945 ==
In 1935, Daniel B. Brunton, a Democrat was elected.

== 1947 ==
In 1947, Daniel B. Brunton, a Democrat was reelected to a second term.

== 1949 ==
In 1949, Daniel B. Brunton, a Democrat was reelected to a third term.

== 1951 mayoral election ==
Springfield, Massachusetts mayoral election, 1951
- November 6, 1951
| Candidate | Daniel B. Brunton | Vernon E. Bradley |
| Party | Democratic | Republican |
| Popular vote | 25,482 | 23,501 |
| Percentage | 52.02% | 47.98% |
Mayor before election
Daniel B. Brunton
Democratic
Elected mayor
Daniel B. Brunton
Democratic

The 1951 Springfield, Massachusetts mayoral election was held on November 6, 1951. It saw incumbent mayor Daniel B. Brunton reelected to a fourth term.

=== Democratic Primary ===
==== Candidates ====
- Daniel B. Brunton, incumbent mayor
- Saul Silbergleit, business owner

1951 Springfield, Massachusetts mayoral Democratic primary results October 9, 1953
| Party | Candidate | Votes | % |
|---|---|---|---|
| Democratic | Daniel B. Brunton | 7,501 | 89.37% |
| Democratic | Saul Silbergleit | 892 | 10.63% |
| Total votes | | 8,393 | 100 |

=== Republican Primary ===
==== Candidates ====
- Vernon E. Bradley, member of Board of Assessors
- Saul Silbergleit, business owner
- Leland A. Stone, member of School Committee

1951 Springfield, Massachusetts mayoral Republican primary results October 9, 1953
| Party | Candidate | Votes | % |
|---|---|---|---|
| Republican | Vernon E. Bradley | 5,964 | 61.93% |
| Republican | Leland A. Stone | 3,667 | 38.07% |
| Republican | Saul Silbergleit | 0 | 0% |
| Total votes | | 9,631 | 100 |

=== General Election ===
1951 Springfield, Massachusetts mayoral general election results November 6, 1951
| Party | Candidate | Votes | % |
|---|---|---|---|
| Democratic | Daniel B. Brunton (incumbent) | 25,482 | 52.02% |
| Republican | Wendell P. Chamberlain | 23,501 | 47.98% |
| Total votes | | 54,087 | 100 |

== 1953 mayoral election ==
Springfield, Massachusetts mayoral election, 1953
- November 3, 1953
- Turnout: 64%

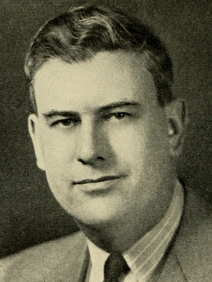
| Candidate | Daniel B. Brunton | Wendell P. Chamberlain |
| Party | Democratic | Republican |
| Popular vote | 32,839 | 21,248 |
| Percentage | 60.72% | 39.29% |
Mayor before election
Daniel B. Brunton
Democratic
Elected mayor
Daniel B. Brunton
Democratic

The 1953 Springfield, Massachusetts mayoral election was held on November 3, 1953. It saw incumbent mayor Daniel B. Brunton reelected to a fifth term.

The primaries marked the first instance in which the city of Springfield used voting machines in all of its precincts. Turnout for the primaries was over 20%.

=== Democratic primary ===
Incumbent mayor Daniel B. Brunton ran unopposed in the Democratic primary. More than 7,000 voters cast votes in the non-competitive Democratic primary.

=== Republican primary ===
In the Republican primary, Wendell P. Chamberlain (a Massachusetts state representative) defeated four candidates for the nomination. His competitors were ward 1 alderman Normand J. Beaudry, assessor Vernon E. Bradley (who had previously been the Republican nominee for mayor in 1951), ward 4 alderman and Springfield Board of Alderman president Henry Clay, and former school board member Theodore Wiel.

1953 Springfield, Massachusetts mayoral Republican primary results October 6, 1953
| Party | Candidate | Votes | % |
|---|---|---|---|
| Republican | Wendell P. Chamberlain | 3,700 | 35.50 |
| Republican | Thedore Wiel | 2,913 | 27.95 |
| Republican | Vernon E. Bradley | 1,987 | 19.06 |
| Republican | Normand J. Beaudry | 1,279 | 12.27 |
| Republican | Henry Clay | 545 | 5.23 |
| Total votes | | 10,424 | 100 |

=== General election ===
1953 Springfield, Massachusetts mayoral general election results November 3, 1953
| Party | Candidate | Votes | % |
|---|---|---|---|
| Democratic | Daniel B. Brunton (incumbent) | 32,839 | 60.72 |
| Republican | Wendell P. Chamberlain | 21,248 | 39.29 |
| Total votes | | 54,087 | 100 |

== 1955 mayoral election ==
Springfield, Massachusetts mayoral election, 1955
- November 8, 1955
| Candidate | Daniel B. Brunton | Leon H. Hutchins |
| Party | Democratic | Republican |
Mayor before election
Daniel B. Brunton
Democratic
Elected mayor
Daniel B. Brunton
Democratic

The 1955 Springfield, Massachusetts mayoral election was held on November 8, 1955. It saw incumbent mayor Daniel B. Brunton reelected to a sixth term.

=== Democratic primary ===
In the Democratic primary, incumbent Daniel B. Brunton faced Hampden County registrar of deeds John P. Lynch and Springfield superintendent of streets James J. Sullivan.

1955 Springfield, Massachusetts mayoral Democratic primary results October 11, 1955
| Party | Candidate | Votes | % |
|---|---|---|---|
| Democratic | Daniel B. Brunton (incumbent) | 9,318 | 49.13 |
| Democratic | John P. Lynch | 4,938 | 26.04 |
| Democratic | James J. Sullivan | 4,711 | 24.84 |
| Total votes | | 18,967 | 100 |

=== Republican primary ===
In the Republican primary, businessman and Springfield Fire Commission member Leon H. Hutchins defeated Board of Assessors member William G. Macauley.

1955 Springfield, Massachusetts mayoral Republican primary results October 11, 1955
| Party | Candidate | Votes | % |
|---|---|---|---|
| Republican | Leon H. Hutchins | 6,288 | 63.55 |
| Republican | William G. McCauley | 3,607 | 36.45 |
| Total votes | | 9,895 | 100 |

=== General election ===
Brunton defeated Hutchins.

== 1957 mayoral election ==
Springfield, Massachusetts mayoral election, 1957
- November 5, 1957
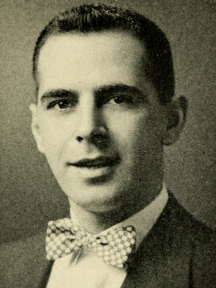

| Candidate | Thomas J. O'Connor | C. Clement Easton |
| Party | Democratic | Republican |
| Popular vote | 31,561 | 20,826 |
| Percentage | 60.25% | 39.75% |
Mayor before election
Daniel B. Brunton
Democratic
Elected mayor
Thomas J. O'Connor
Democratic

The 1957 Springfield, Massachusetts mayoral election was held on November 5, 1957. It saw incumbent mayor Daniel B. Brunton unseated, losing renomination in the Democratic primary to Thomas J. O'Connor, who went on to win the general election.

O'Connor became the youngest mayor in the city's history.

=== Democratic primary ===
Incumbent mayor Daniel B. Brunton lost renomination to Massachusetts state representative Thomas J. O'Connor in a landslide, losing in all of the city's 68 voting precincts.

When Brunton first announced his campaign against the longtime mayor, his odds of succeeding were seen as slim.

Significant issues debated in the primary included the city's police commission, off-street parking, and businesses leaving the city's downtown.

1957 Springfield, Massachusetts mayoral Democratic primary results October 8, 1957
| Party | Candidate | Votes | % |
|---|---|---|---|
| Democratic | Thomas J. O'Connor | 15,380 | 66.36 |
| Democratic | Daniel B. Brunton (incumbent) | 7,796 | 33.64 |
| Total votes | | 23,176 | 100 |

=== Republican primary ===
1957 Springfield, Massachusetts mayoral Republican primary results October 8, 1957
| Party | Candidate | Votes | % |
|---|---|---|---|
| Republican | C. Clement Easton | 5,068 | 77.09 |
| Republican | Norman E. Cowles | 644 | 9.80 |
| Republican | Harriet C. Teta | 537 | 8.17 |
| Republican | Albert B. Vincent | 325 | 4.94 |
| Total votes | | 6,574 | 100 |

=== General election ===
1957 Springfield, Massachusetts mayoral general election results November 5, 1957
| Party | Candidate | Votes | % |
|---|---|---|---|
| Democratic | Thomas J. O'Connor | 31,561 | 60.25 |
| Republican | C. Clement Easton | 20,826 | 39.75 |
| Total votes | | 52,387 | 100 |

== 1959 mayoral election ==
Springfield, Massachusetts mayoral election, 1959
- November 3, 1959
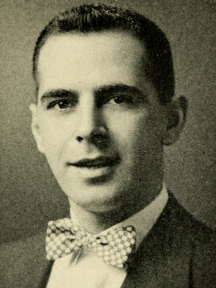

| Candidate | Thomas J. O'Connor | Paul E. Affleck |
| Party | Democratic | Republican |
| Popular vote | 39,409 | 11,424 |
| Percentage | 74.72% | 21.66% |
Mayor before election
Thomas J. O'Connor
Democratic
Elected mayor
Thomas J. O'Connor
Democratic

The 1959 Springfield, Massachusetts mayoral election was held on November 3, 1959. It saw the reelection of incumbent mayor Thomas J. O'Connor.

This was Springfield's final partisan mayoral election, as voters also voted to approve a move to nonpartisan elections. The measure that did so also switched from a weak mayor form of government to a strong mayor form.

=== Democratic primary ===
In a rematch of the 1957 Democratic primary, incumbent mayor Thomas J. O'Connor was challenged by former mayor Daniel B. Brunton. O'Connor handily defeated O'Connor, leading him in all 66 of the city's 68 voting precincts.

Results

1959 Springfield, Massachusetts mayoral Democratic primary results October 6, 1959
| Party | Candidate | Votes | % |
|---|---|---|---|
| Democratic | Thomas J. O'Connor (incumbent) | 21,975 | 76.82 |
| Democratic | Daniel B. Brunton | 6,630 | 23.18 |
| Total votes | | 28,605 | 100 |

Results by ward

| Ward | Brunton | | O'Connor | | Total Votes |
| Ward | Votes | % | Votes | % | Total Votes |
|---|---|---|---|---|---|
| 1st | 617 | 27.39% | 1,636 | 72.61% | 2,253 |
| 2nd | 1,557 | 23.21% | 5,152 | 76.79% | 6,709 |
| 3rd | 1,450 | 37.28% | 2,439 | 62.72% | 3,889 |
| 4th | 484 | 33.04% | 981 | 66.96% | 1,465 |
| 5th | 431 | 22.97% | 1,445 | 77.03% | 1,876 |
| 6th | 476 | 13.78% | 2,978 | 86.22% | 3,454 |
| 7th | 791 | 20.80% | 3,012 | 79.20% | 3803 |
| 8th | 824 | 16.30% | 4,232 | 83.70% | 5,056 |

=== Republican primary ===
Paul E. Affleck, the city councilman from the city's 5th ward, won the Republican primary unopposed.

=== General election ===
Running as an independent candidate was Daniel B. Brunton, who had failed to win the Democratic primary.

1959 Springfield, Massachusetts mayoral general election results November 3, 1959
| Party | Candidate | Votes | % |
|---|---|---|---|
| Democratic | Thomas J. O'Connor (incumbent) | 39,409 | 74.72 |
| Republican | Paul E. Affleck | 11,424 | 21.66 |
| Independent | Daniel B. Brunton | 1,910 | 3.62 |
| Total votes | | 52,743 | 100 |

== 1961 mayoral election ==
Springfield, Massachusetts mayoral election, 1961
- November 7, 1961

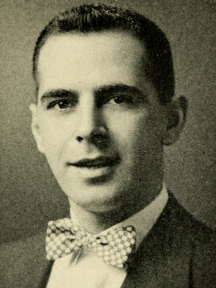
| Candidate | Charles Ryan | Thomas J. O'Connor |
| Popular vote | 28,999 | 26,471 |
| Percentage | 52.28% | 47.72% |
Mayor before election
Thomas J. O'Connor
Democratic
Elected mayor
Charles Ryan
Democratic

The 1961 Springfield, Massachusetts mayoral election was held on November 7, 1961, and was preceded by a primary on October 10. It saw Charles Ryan defeat incumbent mayor Thomas J. O'Connor. It was the city's first nonpartisan mayoral election

=== Candidates ===
- Norman E. Cowles
- Arbold R. Craven
- Thomas J. O'Connor, incumbent mayor since 1958
- Charles Ryan, lawyer
- Bernard M. Lapointe
- John P. Lynch, Hampden County registrar of deeds since 1952, and 1955 mayoral candidate
- Arthur J. McKenna
- Armand N. Tancrati, Massachusetts state representative
- Raymond N. Tuller Jr.

=== Campaign ===
The 1960 reassessment of all real estate in Springfield led to a furor when one-third of the city's homeowners received increases in their property tax over the previous year. On October 11, 1960, 4,500 residents attended a meeting at Springfield Auditorium where members of the Board of Assessors attempted to explain the tax increase. Each member was booed off the stage before they could speak. O'Connor, who had no role in the property reassessment, failed to quiet the crowd and police were called in. O'Connor planned to cut 578 jobs from the 1961 budget to reduce the city's taxes, but reversed this decision due to a lack of public support.

O'Connor's general election defeat was considered an upset.

Two weeks after O'Connor's loss, the city's percentage assessment system, which had been a major issue during the campaign, was declared unconstitutional by the Massachusetts Supreme Judicial Court.

=== Results ===
Primary

1961 Springfield, Massachusetts mayoral primary results October 10, 1961
| Candidate | Votes | % |
|---|---|---|
| Thomas J. O'Connor (incumbent) | 14,563 | 34.54 |
| Charles Ryan | 9,295 | 22.04 |
| Raymond N. Tuller Jr. | 7,874 | 18.67 |
| John P. Lynch | 5,554 | 13.17 |
| Armand N. Tancrati | 3,214 | 7.62 |
| Arthur J. McKenna | 1,282 | 3.04 |
| Norman E. Cowles | 177 | 0.42 |
| Bernard M. Lapointe | 112 | 0.27 |
| Arbold R. Craven | 97 | 0.23 |
| Total votes | 42,168 | 100 |

General election

1961 Springfield, Massachusetts mayoral general election results November 7, 1961
| Candidate | Votes | % |
|---|---|---|
| Charles Ryan | 28,999 | 52.28 |
| Thomas J. O'Connor (incumbent) | 26,471 | 47.72 |
| Total votes | 55,470 | 100 |

== 1963 mayoral election ==
Springfield, Massachusetts mayoral election, 1963
- November 6, 1963
| Candidate | Charles Ryan | John P. Lynch |
| Popular vote | 32,063 | 11,909 |
| Percentage | 72.92% | 27.08% |
Mayor before election
Charles Ryan
Democratic
Elected mayor
Charles Ryan
Democratic

The 1963 Springfield, Massachusetts mayoral election was held on November 6, 1963, and was preceded by a primary on October 8. It saw incumbent mayor Charles Ryan reelected.

=== Candidates ===
- Arthur R. Caney
- John P. Lynch, Hampden County registrar of deeds since 1952; 1955 and 1961 mayoral candidate
- Charles Ryan, incumbent mayor

=== Campaign ===
Incumbent mayor Charles Ryan and registrar of deeds John P. Lynch were considered the two major contenders. A third candidate in the primary, Arthur R. Caney, was regarded as a political unknown. Ryan and Lynch were the two who advanced to the general election.

Both Lynch and Ryan identified as Democrats. Ryan's campaign was managed by his brother, Donald Ryan.

The campaign turned tense when, eight days before the general election, Lynch accused Ryan of being an advocate of busing, bringing a racially-charged issue into the mix. The day before the election, in a television appearance, Ryan alleged that bussing had already started, and that Ryan had approved it. On the day of the election, the Springfield Union ran two full-paged advertisements which showed black children departing school buses at Memorial School in the fashionable, and largely white, East Forest Park neighborhood. The ads, again claimed that Ryan had begun busing in the city. Ryan responded by making a series of radio appearances on Election Day. In one he claimed that the photos actually were showing black children that had been transported to the school, not for the sake of racial integration, but due to overcrowding at schools in parts of the cities that were predominantly black. He also came out against using bussing to resolve de facto segregation.

=== Results ===
Primary

1963 Springfield, Massachusetts mayoral primary results October 8, 1963
| Candidate | Votes | % |
|---|---|---|
| Charles Ryan (incumbent) | 11,906 | 57 |
| John P. Lynch | 7,284 | |
| Arthur R. Caney | | |
| Total votes | | 100 |

General election

1963 Springfield, Massachusetts mayoral general election results. November 6, 1963
| Candidate | Votes | % |
|---|---|---|
| Charles Ryan (incumbent) | 32,063 | 72.92 |
| John P. Lynch | 11,909 | 27.08 |
| Total votes | 43,972 | 100 |

== 1965 mayoral election ==
Springfield, Massachusetts mayoral election, 1965
- November 2, 1965

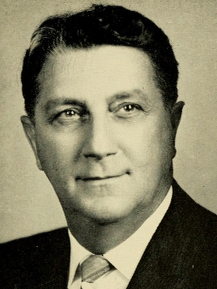
| Candidate | Charles Ryan | James Grimaldi |
Mayor before election
Charles Ryan
Democratic
Elected mayor
Charles Ryan
Democratic

The 1965 Springfield, Massachusetts mayoral election was held on November 2, 1965, and was preceded by a primary on October 4. It saw the reelection of Charles Ryan to a third term.

The primary, held October 4, had been moved from its original date of October 5. Unusually, this made Election Day a Monday instead of a Tuesday. The change of date was made to avoid the election overlapping with the Jewish holiday of Yom Kippur.

=== Candidates ===
- Charles E. Cobb, reverend at St. John's Congregational Church
- James Grimaldi, Massachusetts state representative and Springfield city councilor
- Rojer J. Lemelin, former Springfield assessor
- Charles Ryan, incumbent mayor
- Frances L. Shea, independent advertising agent

=== Campaign ===
In the general election Ryan faced state representative and Springfield city councilor James Grimaldi. He faced several additional candidates in the primary. In the primary, Charles E. Cobb was the first black candidate to run for mayor in the city's history. Frances L. Shea was among the earliest women to run for Springfield's mayoralty.

A major issue in the campaign was how to resolve inequality in the quality of the schools buildings serving the city's largely non-white neighborhoods compared those serving its largely-white neighborhoods. Mayor Ryan proposed limited open enrollment, and hoped for the state to pay for the expense of busing. He felt that black groups had failed to assist in making open enrollment successful in the city. Grimaldi hoped to resolve these inequalities by replacing the city's older school buildings, many of which were located in largely black neighborhoods. Rojer J. Lemelin pledged to follow state's racial imbalance law. Charles E. Cobb argued that students at Buckingham Junior High School (a 63.2% non-white school) were 2.5 years behind students at junior high schools with predominantly white student bodies. He argued against open enrollment, saying that it asked, "the very people least able to pay" to personally finance their children's transportation. Frances L. Shea promised to follow the state's racial imbalance law, but argued that, "all laws are flexible and we should make them fit our situation".

Other major issues included taxes, the proposed closure of the Springfield Armory, and allegations of police brutality in the city.

== 1967 mayoral election ==
Springfield, Massachusetts mayoral election, 1967
- November 7, 1967
Candidate
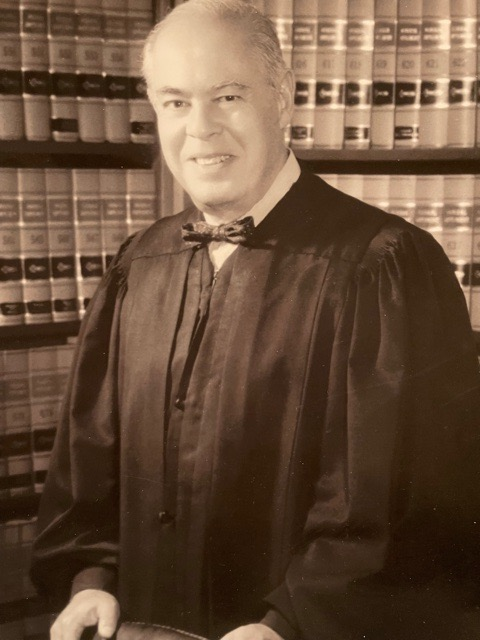
Frank Harlan Freedman
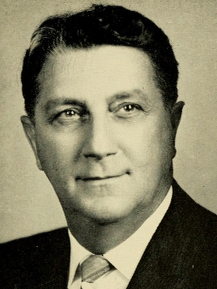
James Grimaldi
Mayor before election
Charles Ryan
Democratic
Elected mayor
Frank Harlan Freedman
Republican

The 1967 Springfield, Massachusetts mayoral election was held on November 7, 1967. It saw the election of Frank Harlan Freedman. Incumbent mayor Charles Ryan did not seek reelection, instead accepting a lecturing job at the Springfield College. It saw the elect of Frank Harlan Freedman.

=== Candidates ===
- James Grimaldi, Massachusetts state representative since 1965, former Springfield city councilor; 1965 and 1967 mayoral candidate
- Frank Harlan Freedman, Springfield city councilor and assistant attorney general

=== Campaign ===
While the election was officially nonpartisan, Freeman was a Republican and Grimaldi was a Democrat. Freedman became the city's first Jewish mayor. If elected, Grimaldi would have been its first Italian mayor.

== 1969 mayoral election ==
Springfield, Massachusetts mayoral election, 1969
- November 4, 1969
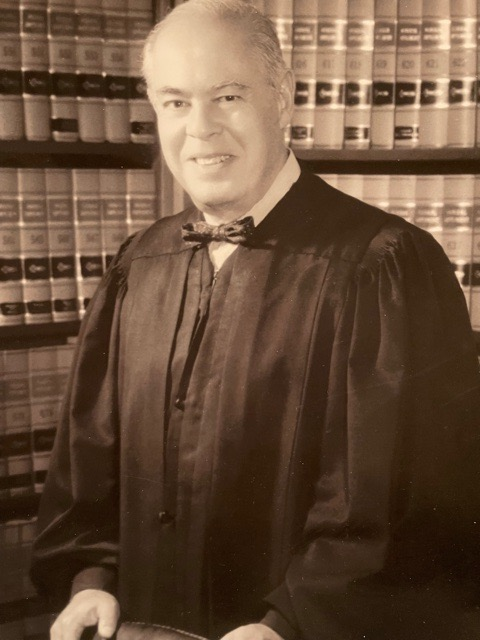

| Candidate | Frank Harlan Freedman | William J. Kingston |
| Popular vote | 32,442 | 8,499 |
| Percentage | 79.24% | 20.76% |
Mayor before election
Frank Harlan Freedman
Republican
Elected mayor
Frank Harlan Freedman
Republican

The 1969 Springfield, Massachusetts mayoral election was held on November 4, 1969, and was preceded by a primary held on October 7, 1969. It saw the reelection of Frank Harlan Freedman.

=== Candidates ===
- James Grimaldi, Massachusetts state representative since 1965, former Springfield city councilor; 1965 and 1967 mayoral candidate
- Frank Harlan Freedman, incumbent mayor since 1968
- Frederick Hurst
- William J. Kingston, parks commissioner and former Minor League Baseball player

=== Campaign ===
Democratic state representative James Grimaldi was a late entrant into the race.

Frederick Hurst's performance in the primary was regarded to have been surprisingly poor. He was one of the earliest black candidates to run for mayor of Springfield.

Freedman's reelection in the general election was aided by popular approval of how he had recently handled a public transit strike and welfare-related protests.

=== Results ===
Primary

1969 Springfield, Massachusetts mayoral primary election results October 7, 1969
| Candidate | Votes | % |
|---|---|---|
| Frank H. Freedman (incumbent) | 12,974 | 62.09 |
| William J. Kingston | 4,385 | 20.99 |
| James L. Grimaldi | 2,886 | 13.81 |
| Frederick A. Hurst | 651 | 3.12 |
| Total votes | 20,896 | 100 |

General election

1971 Springfield, Massachusetts mayoral general election results November 4, 1969
| Candidate | Votes | % |
|---|---|---|
| Frank H. Freedman (incumbent) | 32,442 | 79.24 |
| William J. Kingston | 8,499 | 20.76 |
| Total votes | 40,941 | 100 |

== 1971 mayoral election ==
Springfield, Massachusetts mayoral election, 1971
- November 2, 1971
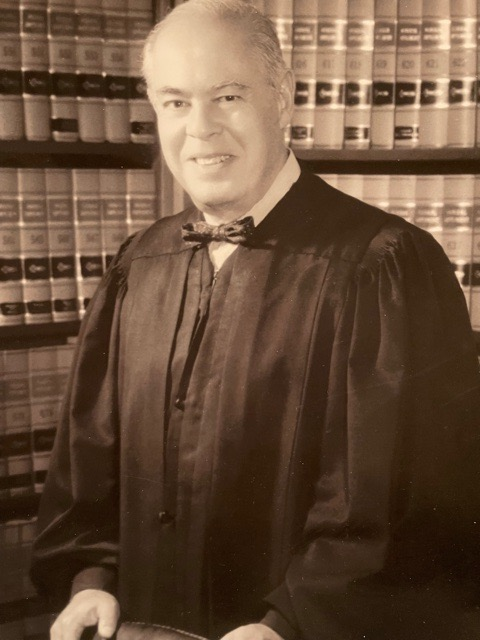

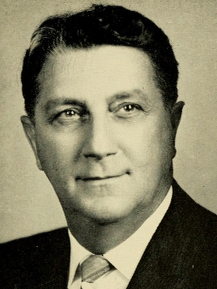
| Candidate | Frank Harlan Freedman | James Grimaldi |
| Popular vote | 36,205 | 13,635 |
| Percentage | 72.64% | 27.36% |
Mayor before election
Frank Harlan Freedman
Republican
Elected mayor
Frank Harlan Freedman
Republican

The 1971 Springfield, Massachusetts mayoral election was held on November 2, 1971, and was preceded by a primary on October 5, 1971. It saw the reelection of Frank Harlan Freedman to a third term.

=== Candidates ===
- Douglas Ariel, conservative activist, mail carrier
- Socrates Babacas, business owner
- Frank Harlan Freedman, incumbent mayor since 1968
- James L. Grimaldi, Massachusetts state representative since 1965, former Springfield city councilor; 1965, 1967 and 1969 mayoral candidate
- Wallace Hindes

=== Results ===
Primary

1971 Springfield, Massachusetts mayoral primary election results October 5, 1971
| Candidate | Votes | % |
|---|---|---|
| Frank H. Freedman (incumbent) | 11,111 | 59.41 |
| James L. Grimaldi | 5,393 | 28.84 |
| Socrates T. Babacas | 1,018 | 5.44 |
| Douglas D. Ariel | 986 | 5.27 |
| Wallace D. Hindes | 195 | 1.05 |
| Total votes | 18,703 | 100 |

General election

1971 Springfield, Massachusetts mayoral general election results November 2, 1971
| Candidate | Votes | % |
|---|---|---|
| Frank H. Freedman (incumbent) | 36,205 | 72.64 |
| James L. Grimaldi | 13,635 | 27.36 |
| Total votes | 49,840 | 100 |

== 1973 mayoral special election ==
Springfield, Massachusetts mayoral special election, 1973
- January 30, 1973
| Candidate | William C. Sullivan | Paul Mason |
| Popular vote | 13,738 | 2,790 |
| Percentage | 83.09% | 16.87% |
Mayor before election
Theodore Dimauro (acting)
Elected mayor
William C. Sullivan

The 1973 Springfield, Massachusetts mayoral special election was held on January 30, 1973, to fill the vacancy left after Frank Harlan Freedman resigned as mayor in October 1972 to accept an appointment as a U.S. district court judge. The election saw the election of William C. Sullivan.

Paul Mason was only the third black candidate to run for mayor in the city's history. He openly regarded his candidacy as more an effort to build up a following to help him run more successfully for the office two years later.

=== Candidates ===
- Paul Mason, Springfield city councilor
- William C. Sullivan, Springfield city clerk

=== Results ===
1973 Springfield, Massachusetts mayoral special election results January 30, 1973
| Candidate | Votes | % |
|---|---|---|
| William C. Sullivan | 13,738 | 83.09 |
| Paul R. Mason | 2,790 | 16.87 |
| Theodore Dimauro (incumbent) | 3 | 0 |
| William O'Neil | 1 | 0 |
| Schmidt & Anderson | 2 | 0 |
| Total votes | 16,534 | 100 |

== 1973 mayoral election ==
Springfield, Massachusetts mayoral election, 1973
- November 6, 1973
| Candidate | William C. Sullivan | Arnold B. Craven |
| Popular vote | 22,082 | 2,005 |
| Percentage | 91.68% | 8.32% |
Mayor before election
William C. Sullivan
Elected mayor
William C. Sullivan

The 1973 Springfield, Massachusetts mayoral election was held on November 6, 1973. It saw the reelection of incumbent William C. Sullivan (first elected earlier that year in a special election) to his first full term.

Because only two candidates ran, there was no need for a primary election.

=== Candidates ===
- Arnold B. Craven, 1961 mayoral candidate
- William C. Sullivan, incumbent mayor

=== Results ===
1971 Springfield, Massachusetts mayoral general election results November 6, 1973
| Candidate | Votes | % |
|---|---|---|
| William C. Sullivan (incumbent) | 22,082 | 91.68 |
| Arnold B. Craven | 2,005 | 8.32 |
| Total votes | 24,087 | 100 |

== 1975 mayoral election ==
Springfield, Massachusetts mayoral election, 1975
- November 4, 1975
| Candidate | William C. Sullivan | Stephen Desmond |
| Popular vote | 20,404 | 2,685 |
| Percentage | 88.37% | 11.63% |
Mayor before election
William C. Sullivan
Elected mayor
William C. Sullivan

The 1975 Springfield, Massachusetts mayoral election was held on November 4, 1975, and was preceded by a primary on October 5, 1975. It saw the reelection of William C. Sullivan to a second full, and third overall, term.

=== Candidates ===
- Stephen Desmond
- Wallace D. Hindes
- Peter Charles LeLuce
- William C. Sullivan, incumbent mayor

=== Campaign ===
Stephen Desmond was a first-time candidate for public office, and ran as a U.S. Labor Party-backed candidate.

=== Results ===
Primary

1975 Springfield, Massachusetts mayoral primary election results October 5, 1975
| Candidate | Votes | % |
|---|---|---|
| William C. Sullivan (incumbent) | 9,270 | 86.44 |
| Stephen Desmond | 661 | 6.16 |
| Wallace D. Hindes | 457 | 4.26 |
| Peter Charles LeLuce | 336 | 3.13 |
| Total votes | 10,724 | 20 |

General election

1975 Springfield, Massachusetts mayoral general election results November 4, 1975
| Candidate | Votes | % |
|---|---|---|
| William C. Sullivan (incumbent) | 20,404 | 88.37 |
| Stephen Desmond | 2,685 | 11.63 |
| Total votes | 23,089 | |

== 1977 mayoral election ==
Springfield, Massachusetts mayoral election, 1977
- November 8, 1977

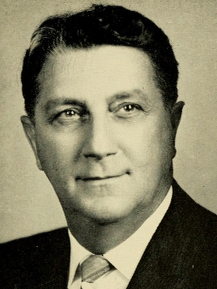
| Candidate | Theodore E. Dimauro | James Grimaldi |
| Popular vote | 20,644 | 8,115 |
| Percentage | 71.78% | 28.22% |
Mayor before election
William C. Sullivan
Elected mayor
Theodore E. Dimauro

The 1977 Springfield, Massachusetts mayoral election was held on November 8, 1977, and was preceded by a primary on October 11. It saw the election of Theodore E. Dimauro. Incumbent mayor William C. Sullivan did not seek reelection.

=== Candidates ===
- Theodore E. Dimauro, Springfield City Council president, Springfield city councilor since 1970, member of the Massachusetts Governor's Council since 1975, former acting mayor (1972–1973), and former Springfield School Committee member
- Winston Gaskins
- James L. Grimaldi, Massachusetts state representative since 1965, former Springfield city councilor; 1965, 1967, 1969 and 1971 mayoral candidate
- Wallace Hindes (write-in)
- William Kelly
- John P. Lynch, Hampden County registrar of deeds since 1952, 1972 United States Senate candidate; 1955, 1961 and 1963 mayoral candidate
- John D. McCarthy

=== Campaign ===
Theodore E. Dimauro campaigned on revitalizing the city's downtown, and talked about pursuing further public-private partnerships to accomplish this.

James L. Grimaldi, an experienced elected official (with 12 years experience on the Springfield City Council and 13 years experience in the Massachusetts House of Representatives) had long aspired to be Springfield's mayor, having run four times previously. By 1977, Grimaldi was 66 years of age, and likely saw the election as his last chance to win the city's mayoralty. He campaigned hard against Dimauro, accusing him of being a puppet for big business, of valuing the city's downtown at the expense of the remainder of the city, and criticizing him for his vote as a member of the Massachusetts Governor's Council to confirm a black woman to be an associate justice of the Boston Municipal Court.

With both Dimauro and Grimaldi being Italian-Americans, the general election matchup guaranteed that the city would elect its first mayor of Italian descent.

=== Results ===
Primary

1977 Springfield, Massachusetts mayoral primary election results October 11, 1977
| Candidate | Votes | % |
|---|---|---|
| Theodore E. Dimauro | 13,286 | 65.75 |
| James L. Grimaldi | 3,128 | 15.48 |
| John Pierce Lynch | 2,825 | 13.98 |
| Winston J. Gaskins | 470 | 2.33 |
| John D. McCarthy | 282 | 1.40 |
| William J. Kelly | 216 | 1.07 |
| Wallace Hindes | 1 | 0.00 |
| Total votes | 20,208 | 100 |

General election

1977 Springfield, Massachusetts mayoral general election results November 8, 1971
| Candidate | Votes | % |
|---|---|---|
| Theodore E. Dimauro | 20,644 | 71.78 |
| James L. Grimaldi | 8,115 | 28.22 |
| Total votes | 28,759 | 100 |

== 1979 mayoral election ==
Springfield, Massachusetts mayoral election, 1979
- November 6, 1979
| Candidate | Theodore Dimauro | Winston Gaskins |
| Popular vote | 20,553 | 3,518 |
| Percentage | 85.39% | 14.62% |
Mayor before election
Theodore Dimauro
Elected mayor
Theodore Dimauro

The 1979 Springfield, Massachusetts mayoral election was held on November 6, 1979, and was preceded by a primary on October 9, 1979. It saw the reelection of Theodore Dimauro to a second term.

=== Candidates ===
- Theodore E. Dimauro, incumbent mayor since 1978
- Winston Gaskins, 1979 mayoral candidate
- Wallace D Hindes

=== Results ===
Primary

1979 Springfield, Massachusetts mayoral primary election results October 9, 1979
| Candidate | Votes | % |
|---|---|---|
| Theodore E. Dimauro (incumbent) | 4,696 | 80.29 |
| Winston S. Gaskins | 782 | 13.37 |
| Wallace D Hindes | 371 | 6.34 |
| Total votes | 5,849 | 100 |

General election

1979 Springfield, Massachusetts mayoral general election results November 6, 1979
| Candidate | Votes | % |
|---|---|---|
| Theodore E. Dimauro (incumbent) | 20,553 | 85.39 |
| Winston S. Gaskins | 3,518 | 14.62 |
| Total votes | 24,071 | 100 |

== 1981 mayoral election ==
Springfield, Massachusetts mayoral election, 1981
- November 3, 1981
| Candidate | Theodore Dimauro | Winston Gaskins |
| Popular vote | 24,724 | 14,017 |
| Percentage | 63.82% | 36.18% |
Mayor before election
Theodore Dimauro
Elected mayor
Theodore Dimauro

The 1981 Springfield, Massachusetts mayoral election was held on November 3, 1981, and was preceded by a primary on October 6, 1981. It saw the reelection of Theodore Dimauro to a third term.

=== Results ===
Primary

1981 Springfield, Massachusetts mayoral primary election results October 6, 1981
| Candidate | Votes | % |
|---|---|---|
| Theodore E. Dimauro (incumbent) | 10,693 | 48.40 |
| Peter J. Jurzynski | 8,237 | 37.28 |
| Timothy T. Collins | 2,891 | 13.09 |
| Joseph B. Flynn | 210 | 0.95 |
| Joseph D. Harrington | 63 | 0.29 |
| Total votes | 22,094 | 100 |

General election

1981 Springfield, Massachusetts mayoral general election results November 3, 1981
| Candidate | Votes | % |
|---|---|---|
| Theodore E. Dimauro (incumbent) | 24,724 | 63.82 |
| Peter J. Jurzynski | 14,017 | 36.18 |
| Total votes | 38,741 | 100 |

== 1983 mayoral election ==
Springfield, Massachusetts mayoral election, 1983
- November 3, 1983
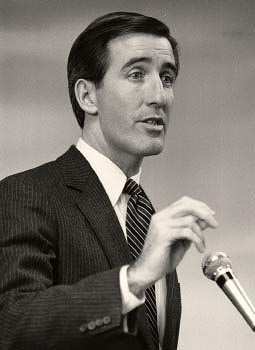

| Candidate | Richard Neal | William Montana |
| Popular vote | 25,462 | 4,373 |
| Percentage | 85.34% | 14.66% |
Mayor before election
Theodore Dimauro
Elected mayor
Richard Neal
Democratic

The 1983 Springfield, Massachusetts mayoral election was held on November 3, 1983, and was preceded by a primary on September 20, 1983. It saw the election of Richard Neal.

Facing a prospective challenge from city councilor Richard Neal, incumbent mayor Theodore Dimauro opted to instead retire.

=== Candidates ===
- Joseph Harrington, 1981 mayoral candidate
- William G. Montana
- Richard Neal, Springfield city councilor since 1979

=== Results ===
Primary

1983 Springfield, Massachusetts mayoral primary election results September 20, 1983
| Candidate | Votes | % |
|---|---|---|
| Richard E. Neal | 11,315 | 85.58 |
| William G. Montana | 1,113 | 8.42 |
| Joseph D. Harrington | 793 | 6.00 |
| Total votes | 13,221 | 100 |

General election

1983 Springfield, Massachusetts mayoral general election results November 3, 1983
| Candidate | Votes | % |
|---|---|---|
| Richard E. Neal | 25,462 | 85.34 |
| William G. Montana | 4,373 | 14.66 |
| Total votes | 29,835 | 100 |

== 1985 mayoral election ==
Springfield, Massachusetts mayoral election, 1985
- November 5, 1985
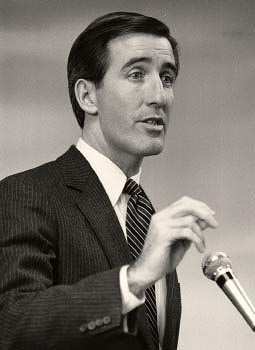

| Candidate | Richard Neal | Joseph Harrington |
| Popular vote | 19,382 | 1,658 |
| Percentage | 92.12% | 7.88% |
Mayor before election
Richard Neal
Democratic
Elected mayor
Richard Neal
Democratic

The 1985 Springfield, Massachusetts mayoral election was held on November 5, 1985. It saw the reelection of Richard Neal.

=== Candidates ===
- Joseph Harrington, 1981 and 1983 mayoral candidate
- Richard Neal, incumbent mayor since 1983

=== Results ===
1985 Springfield, Massachusetts mayoral general election results November 5, 1985
| Candidate | Votes | % |
|---|---|---|
| Richard E. Neal (incumbent) | 19,382 | 92.12 |
| Joseph D. Harrington | 1,658 | 7.88 |
| Total votes | 21,040 | 100 |

== 1987 mayoral election ==
Springfield, Massachusetts mayoral election, 1987
- November 3, 1987
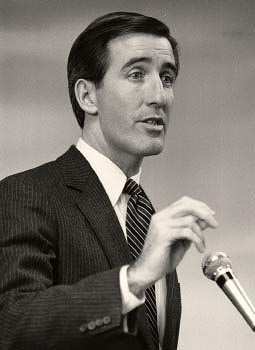

| Candidate | Richard Neal | Joseph Harrington |
| Popular vote | 20,612 | 1,879 |
| Percentage | 91.65% | 8.36% |
Mayor before election
Richard Neal
Democratic
Elected mayor
Richard Neal
Democratic

The 1987 Springfield, Massachusetts mayoral election was held on November 3, 1987. It saw the reelection of incumbent Richard Neal to a third term.

=== Candidates ===
- Joseph Harrington, 1981, 1983, and 1985 mayoral candidate
- Richard Neal, incumbent mayor since 1983

=== Results ===
1987 Springfield, Massachusetts mayoral general election results November 3, 1987
| Candidate | Votes | % |
|---|---|---|
| Richard E. Neal (incumbent) | 20,612 | 91.65 |
| Joseph D. Harrington | 1,879 | 8.36 |
| Total votes | 22,491 | 100 |

== 1989 mayoral special election ==
Springfield, Massachusetts mayoral special election, 1989
- April 25, 1989
| Candidate | Mary Hurley | Vincent DiMonaco |
| Popular vote | 16,636 | 7,536 |
| Percentage | 68.82% | 31.18% |
Mayor before election
Vincent DiMonaco (acting)
Elected mayor
Mary Hurley

The 1989 Springfield, Massachusetts mayoral special election was held on April 25, 1989, and was preceded by a primary on March 21, 1989. It was held to fill the vacancy left after mayor Richard Neal resigned to become a U.S. congressman. The election saw the election of the city's first female mayor Mary Hurley, who defeated acting mayor Vincent MiMonaco.

=== Candidates ===
- Vincent DiMonaco, acting mayor and Springfield city councilor since 1972
- Joseph Harrington, 1981, 1983, 1985, and 1987 mayoral candidate
- Mary Hurley, Springfield city councilor since 1980

=== Campaign ===
In his brief period as acting mayor, DiMonaco had taken a tough stance on drugs, and expressed criticism of what he deemed to be "insufficient" financial support coming from the state and federal governments. He also, with 18 years experience on the City Council and prior experience on the Springfield School Committee, made an effort to portray himself as the more experienced candidate

Hurley accused DiMonaco of "flip-flopping" on various issues, such as whether the National Guard should be used to fight against illegal drugs in the city, which he had previously advocated for, but since walked back his support for.

DiMonaco accused Hurley of receiving the back of a Richard Neal-led political machine. Neal, however, remained publicly neutral in the election, and questioned DiMonaco's assertion that a political machine existed in the city.

Hurley raised $240,000 for her campaign, almost five times as much as DiMonaco managed to raise for his. This fundraising advantage enabled her to run a last-minute battery of television advertisements.

=== Results ===
Primary

1989 Springfield, Massachusetts mayoral special election primary results March 21, 1989
| Candidate | Votes | % |
|---|---|---|
| Mary Hurley | 10,331 | 64.66 |
| Vincent DiMonaco (incumbent) | 5,318 | 33.28 |
| Joseph D. Harrington | 325 | 2.03 |
| Robert Markel | 2 | 0 |
| Dan Williams | 1 | 0 |
| "No name" | 1 | 0 |
| Total votes | 15,978 | 100 |

General election

1983 Springfield, Massachusetts mayoral general election results April 25, 1989
| Candidate | Votes | % |
|---|---|---|
| Mary Hurley | 16,636 | 68.82 |
| Vincent DiMonaco (incumbent) | 7,536 | 31.18 |
| Total votes | 24,172 | 100 |

== 1989 mayoral election ==
Springfield, Massachusetts mayoral election, 1989
- November 7, 1989
Mayor before election
Mary Hurley
Elected mayor
Mary Hurley

The 1989 Springfield, Massachusetts mayoral election was held on November 7, 1989, and saw the reelection of incumbent mayor Mary Hurley (first elected earlier that year in a special election) to her first full term.

== 1991 mayoral election ==
Springfield, Massachusetts mayoral election, 1991
- November 5, 1991
- Turnout: 47.16%
| Candidate | Robert Markel | Ray Dipasquale |
| Popular vote | 17,286 | 14,996 |
| Percentage | 53.55% | 46.45% |
Mayor before election
Mary Hurley
Elected mayor
Robert Markel

The 1991 Springfield, Massachusetts mayoral election was held on November 5, 1991, and was preceded by a primary on September 24, 1991. It saw the election of Robert Markel.

Incumbent mayor Mary Hurley did not seek reelection, announcing in February that she would not be running, to focus her attention on the city's budget problems. Hurleys' mayoralty had been beset by problems by this time, including wrangling with unions in the prior year.

=== Candidates ===
- Leroy Crenshaw, junior high school teacher
- Ray DiPasquale, Springfield city councilor since 1991 and former Springfield School Council member
- Paul Kalill, former Springfield city councilor (1974–1980)
- Robert Markel, Springfield city councilor
- William Montana, draftsman and 1983 mayoral candidate
- Benjamin Swan, black community activist; management and education consultant

=== Campaign ===
A major issue of the campaign ahead of the primary election was the problem of "white flight" to the city's suburbs.

The frontrunners ahead of the primary election were broadly considered to be Ray DiPasquale, Robert Markel, and Paul Kalill.

As a candidate, Markel advocated for increasing the amount of fees for city services and increasing the enforcement of city codes. Kalill called for a "clean sweep" of politicians in city government.

Benjamin Swan was a first-time candidate for elected office.

William Montana advocated for a curfew for minors, as well as a revival of school prayer and corporal punishment.

=== Results ===
Primary

1991 Springfield, Massachusetts mayoral primary election results September 24, 1991
| Candidate | Votes | % |
|---|---|---|
| Ray DiPasquale | 6,806 | 29.61 |
| Robert Markel | 6,634 | 28.86 |
| Paul Kalill | 6,047 | 26.31 |
| Benjamin Swan | 2,922 | 12.71 |
| Leroy Crenshaw | 440 | 1.91 |
| William Montana | 138 | 0.60 |
| Total votes | 22,987 | |

General election

1991 Springfield, Massachusetts mayoral general election results November 5, 1991
| Candidate | Votes | % |
|---|---|---|
| Robert Markel | 17,286 | 53.55 |
| Ray Dipasquale | 14,996 | 46.45 |
| Total votes | 32,282 | 47.16 |

== 1993 mayoral election ==
Springfield, Massachusetts mayoral election, 1993
- November 2, 1993
| Candidate | Robert Markel | Kateri Walsh |
| Popular vote | 16,804 | 10,560 |
| Percentage | 61.41% | 38.59% |
Mayor before election
Robert Markel
Elected mayor
Robert Markel

The 1993 Springfield, Massachusetts mayoral election was held on November 2, 1993, and was preceded by a primary on September 21, 1993. It saw the reelection of incumbent mayor Robert Markel.

=== Candidates ===
- Robert Markel, incumbent mayor since 1992
- Kateri Walsh, Springfield city councilor
- Benjamin Swan, president of the Springfield NAACP and 1991 mayoral candidate

=== Campaign ===
Merkel took credit for restoring services previously cut in past budgets. Walsh argued that Markel had been neglecting towards public safety. Swan said that safety, education, and employment were the top issues in the city.

=== Results ===
Primary

1993 Springfield, Massachusetts mayoral primary election results September 21, 1993
| Candidate | Votes | % |
|---|---|---|
| Robert T. Markel (incumbent) | 8,154 | 47.87 |
| Kateri Walsh | 4,624 | 27.15 |
| Ben Swan | 4,256 | 24.99 |
| Total votes | 17,034 | 100 |

General election

1993 Springfield, Massachusetts mayoral general election results November 2, 1993
| Candidate | Votes | % |
|---|---|---|
| Robert T. Markel (incumbent) | 16,804 | 61.41 |
| Kateri Walsh | 10,560 | 38.59 |
| Total votes | 27,364 | 100 |

== 1995 mayoral election ==
Springfield, Massachusetts mayoral election, 1995
- November 7, 1995
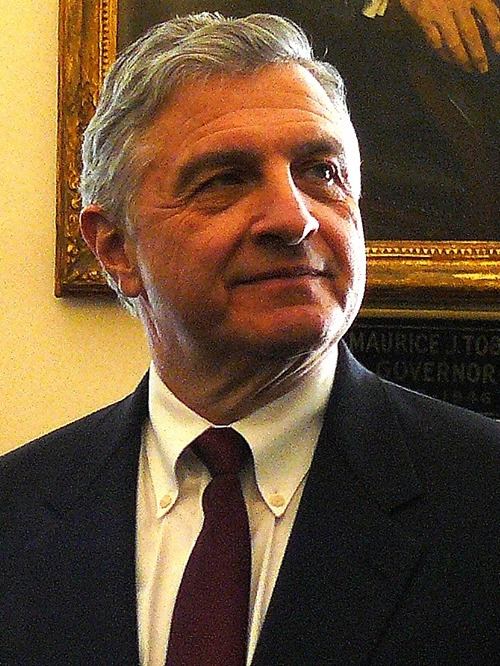

| Candidate | Michael Albano | Charles V. Ryan |
| Popular vote | 18,929 | 17,274 |
| Percentage | 52.29% | 47.71% |
Mayor before election
Robert Markel
Elected mayor
Michael Albano
Democratic

The 1995 Springfield, Massachusetts mayoral election was held on November 7, 1995, and was preceded by a primary on September 19, 1995. It saw the election of mayor Michael Albano, who unseated incumbent mayor Robert Markel. Markel placed third in the primary, thereby failing to make the general election.

=== Candidates ===
- Michael Albano, Springfield City Council president
- Chelan "Jenkins" Brown
- Frederick Hurst, 1969 mayoral candidate
- Robert Markel, incumbent mayor since 1992
- Charles V. Ryan, former mayor (1962–1968)

=== Campaign ===
Expected to be a central issue to voters in the general election was whether Springfield would receive a casino or not. A year prior, voters had rejected a referendum to allow casinos in the city. However, a new nonbonding ballot initiative was up for a vote coinciding with the mayoral general election, which, if approved, would show citizen approval for building a casino in the city's downtown. Albano supported passing the initiative, while Ryan opposed it. The issue dominated the campaign. In the end, however, despite the voters voting against the ballot initiative, Albano (who had supported it) beat Ryan (who had opposed it).

Ahead of the general election, Springfield Newspapers, the publisher of The Springfield Union News & Sunday Republican, backed both the casino ballot initiative and Albano's candidacy.

=== Results ===
Primary

1995 Springfield, Massachusetts mayoral primary election results September 20, 1995
| Candidate | Votes | % |
|---|---|---|
| Charles V. Ryan | 7,930 | 37.25 |
| Michael J. Albano | 6,764 | 31.77 |
| Robert Markel (incumbent) | 4,160 | 19.54 |
| Frederick Hurst | 1,740 | 8.17 |
| Chelan Jenkins | 694 | 3.26 |
| Total votes | 21,288 | 100 |

General election

1995 Springfield, Massachusetts mayoral general election results November 7, 1995
| Candidate | Votes | % |
|---|---|---|
| Michael J. Albano | 18,929 | 52.29 |
| Charles V. Ryan | 17,274 | 47.71 |
| Total votes | 36,203 | 100 |

== 1997 mayoral election ==
Springfield, Massachusetts mayoral election, 1997
- November 4, 1997
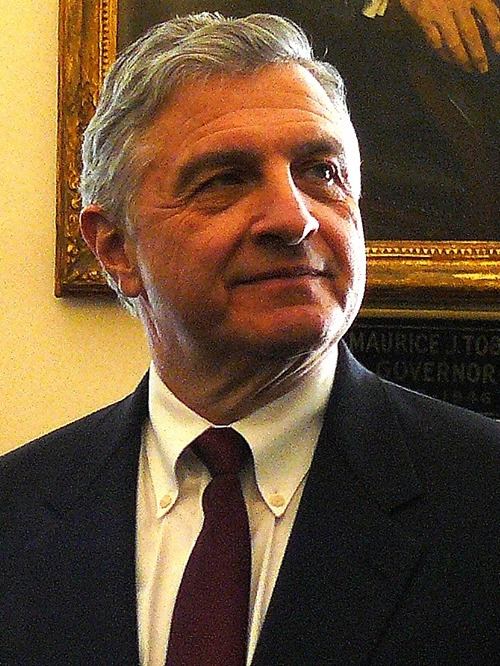
| Candidate | Michael Albano |
| Popular vote | 11,314 |
| Percentage | 100% |
Mayor before election
Michael Albano
Democratic
Elected mayor
Michael Albano
Democratic

The 1997 Springfield, Massachusetts mayoral election was held on November 4, 1997. It saw the reelection of incumbent mayor Michael Albano, who was running uncontested.

=== Results ===
1997 Springfield, Massachusetts mayoral general election results November 4, 1997
| Candidate | Votes | % |
|---|---|---|
| Michael J. Albano (incumbent) | 11,314 | 100 |
| Total votes | 11,314 | 100 |

== 1999 mayoral election ==
Springfield, Massachusetts mayoral election, 1999
- November 2, 1999
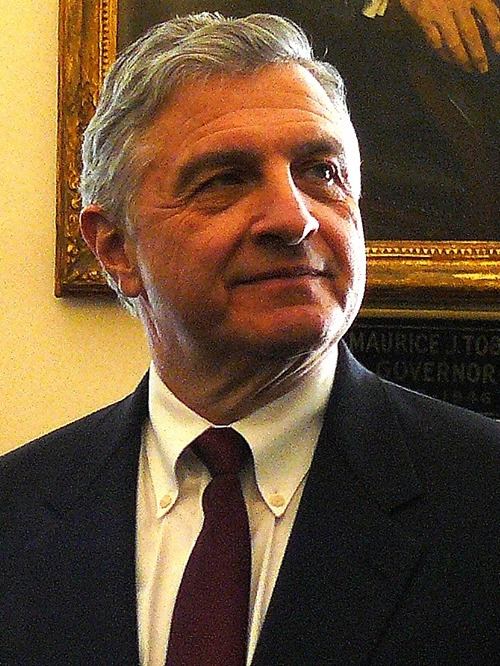
| Candidate | Michael Albano |
| Popular vote | 10,390 |
| Percentage | 100% |
Mayor before election
Michael Albano
Democratic
Elected mayor
Michael Albano
Democratic

The 1999 Springfield, Massachusetts mayoral election was held on November 2, 1999. It saw the reelection of incumbent mayor Michael Albano, running uncontested, to a third term. Because Albano had no opponent, critics of his administration ran Simon, the dog of a prominent activist, as a write-in candidate. Not being human, the votes of Simon were not recorded, but was rumored to be in the hundreds.

=== Results ===
1999 Springfield, Massachusetts mayoral general election results November 2, 1999
| Candidate | Votes | % |
|---|---|---|
| Michael J. Albano (incumbent) | 10,390 | 100 |
| Total votes | 10,390 | 100 |

== 2001 mayoral election ==
Springfield, Massachusetts mayoral election, 2001
- November 6, 2001
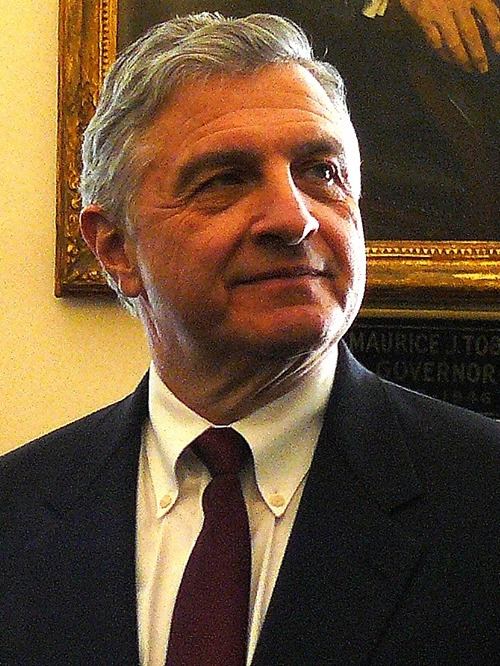

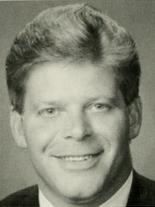
| Candidate | Michael Albano | Paul Caron |
| Popular vote | 19,021 | 14,742 |
| Percentage | 56.34% | 43.66% |
Mayor before election
Michael Albano
Democratic
Elected mayor
Michael Albano
Democratic

The 2001 Springfield, Massachusetts mayoral election was held on November 6, 2001, and was preceded by a primary on September 25, 2001. It saw the reelection of incumbent mayor Michael Albano to a fourth term.

=== Candidates ===
- Michael Albano, incumbent mayor since 1996
- Paul Caron, Massachusetts state representative since 1993
- Nicole Jones

=== Results ===
Primary election

2001 Springfield, Massachusetts mayoral primary election results September 25, 2001
| Candidate | Votes | % |
|---|---|---|
| Michael J. Albano (incumbent) | 9,682 | 53.4 |
| Paul E. Caron | 8,015 | 44.2 |
| Nicole Jones | 445 | 2.5 |
| Others | | |
| Total votes | | 100 |

General election

2001 Springfield, Massachusetts mayoral general election results November 6, 2001
| Candidate | Votes | % |
|---|---|---|
| Michael J. Albano (incumbent) | 19,021 | 56.34 |
| Paul E. Caron | 14,742 | 43.66 |
| Total votes | 33,763 | 100 |

== 2003 mayoral election ==
Springfield, Massachusetts mayoral election, 2003
- November 4, 2003
- Turnout: 33.15%

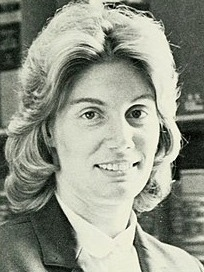
| Candidate | Charles Ryan | Lynda J. Melconian |
| Popular vote | 14,979 | 13,258 |
| Percentage | 52.81% | 46.75% |
Mayor before election
Michael Albano
Democratic
Elected mayor
Charles Ryan

The 2003 Springfield, Massachusetts mayoral election was held on November 4, 2003. It saw former three-term mayor Charles Ryan returned to office for a fourth non-consecutive term.

Incumbent mayor Michael Albano did not seek reelection.

=== Candidates ===
- Lynda J. Melconian, former majority leader of the Massachusetts Senate
- Charles Ryan, former mayor (1962–1968)

=== Results ===
2003 Springfield, Massachusetts mayoral general election results November 4, 2003
| Candidate | Votes | % |
|---|---|---|
| Charles V. Ryan | 14,979 | 52.81 |
| Lynda J. Melconian | 13,258 | 46.75 |
| Others | 125 | 0.44 |
| Total votes | 28,362 | 33.15 |

== 2005 mayoral election ==
Springfield, Massachusetts mayoral election, 2005
- November 8, 2005
- Turnout: 27.85%
| Candidate | Charles Ryan | Tom Ashe |
| Popular vote | 14,164 | 8,038 |
| Percentage | 63.48% | 36.02% |
Mayor before election
Charles Ryan
Elected mayor
Charles Ryan

The 2005 Springfield, Massachusetts mayoral election was held on November 8, 2005, and saw the reelection of incumbent mayor Charles Ryan reelected to a second consecutive, and fifth overall, term as mayor.

=== Candidates ===
- Tom Ashe, member of the Springfield School Committee since 2000 and former member of the Springfield License Commission (1998–1999)
- Charles Ryan, incumbent mayor

=== Results ===
2005 Springfield, Massachusetts mayoral general election results November 8, 2005
| Candidate | Votes | % |
|---|---|---|
| Charles V. Ryan (incumbent) | 14,164 | 63.48 |
| Thomas Ashe | 8,038 | 36.02 |
| Others | 112 | 0.50 |
| Total votes | 22,314 | 27.85 |

== 2007 mayoral election ==
Springfield, Massachusetts mayoral election, 2007
- November 6, 2007
- Turnout: 26.81%
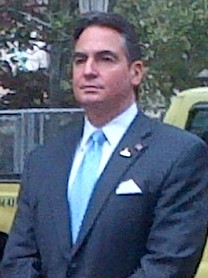

| Candidate | Domenic Sarno | Charles Ryan |
| Popular vote | 11,096 | 9,964 |
| Percentage | 52.54% | 47.18% |
Mayor before election
Charles Ryan
Elected mayor
Domenic Sarno
Democratic

The 2007 Springfield, Massachusetts mayoral election was held on November 6, 2007. It saw Domenic Sarno unseat incumbent mayor Charles Ryan.

When announcing his candidacy for reelection, Ryan had declared that he intended this to be his final campaign for mayor. At the age of 79, he was the oldest mayor in the state at the time he announced his reelection campaign in April.

Since only two candidates ran, no primary was held.

=== Candidates ===
- Charles Ryan, incumbent mayor
- Domenic Sarno, at-large member of the Springfield City Council since 1999

=== Finances ===
| Candidate | Receipts | Expenditures |
|---|---|---|
| Charles V. Ryan | $145,189.21 | $134,788.12 |
| Domenic J. Sarno | $158,495.38 | $127,283.25 |
| Total | $303,684.59 | $262,071.37 |

=== Results ===
2007 Springfield, Massachusetts mayoral general election results November 6, 2007
| Candidate | Votes | % |
|---|---|---|
| Domenic J. Sarno | 11,096 | 52.54 |
| Charles V. Ryan (incumbent) | 9,964 | 47.18 |
| Write-ins | 61 | 0.29 |
| Total votes | 21,121 | 26.81 |

== 2009 mayoral election ==
Springfield, Massachusetts mayoral election, 2009
- November 3, 2009
- Turnout: 24.45%
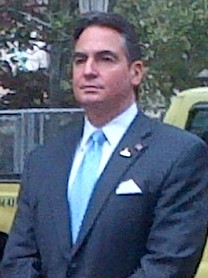

| Candidate | Domenic Sarno | Bud Williams |
| Popular vote | 14,968 | 6,418 |
| Percentage | 69.39% | 29.75% |
Mayor before election
Domenic Sarno
Democratic
Elected mayor
Domenic Sarno
Democratic

The 2009 Springfield, Massachusetts mayoral election was held on November 3, 2009. It saw the reelection on Domenic Sarno.

Since only two candidates ran, no primary was held.

=== Candidates ===
- Domenic Sarno, incumbent mayor since 2010
- Bud Williams, former Springfield city councilor (1993–2008)

=== Results ===
2009 Springfield, Massachusetts mayoral general election results November 3, 2009
| Candidate | Votes | % |
|---|---|---|
| Domenic J. Sarno (incumbent) | 14,968 | 69.39 |
| Bud L. Williams | 6,418 | 29.75 |
| Write-ins | 185 | 0.86 |
| Total votes | 21,571 | 24.45 |

== 2011 mayoral election ==
Springfield, Massachusetts mayoral election, 2011
- November 8, 2011
- Turnout: 21.81%
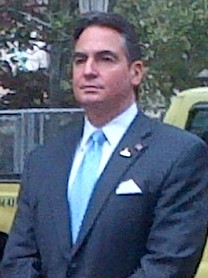

| Candidate | Domenic Sarno | Jose Tosado |
| Popular vote | 14,620 | 5,720 |
| Percentage | 71.68% | 28.04% |
Mayor before election
Domenic Sarno
Democratic
Elected mayor
Domenic Sarno
Democratic

The 2011 Springfield, Massachusetts mayoral election was held on November 8, 2011, and was preceded by a primary on September 20, 2011. Incumbent mayor Domenic Sarno won reelection to a second term.

This was the first election to a four-year mayoral term, Springfield voters had, in 2009, approved a change to the city's charter which extended the mayor's term in office from two to four years.

This was the first time since 2001 that more than two candidates ran, which triggered a primary election.

=== Candidates ===
- Antonette E. Pepe, Springfield School Committee member
- Domenic Sarno, incumbent mayor
- Jose F. Tosado, Springfield City Council president

=== Campaign ===
Both Tosado and Pepe were considered to be high-profile and politically experienced challengers to Sarno. Nevertheless, Sarno heavily led both in the primary, and handily defeated Tosado in the general election.

=== Results ===
Primary
Turnout in the primary, at 14.64%, was historically low.

2011 Springfield, Massachusetts mayoral primary election results September 20, 2011
| Candidate | Votes | % |
|---|---|---|
| Domenic J. Sarno (incumbent) | 8,271 | 60.15 |
| Jose F. Tosado | 3,191 | 23.21 |
| Antoine E. Pepe | 2,276 | 16.55 |
| Write-ins | 13 | 0.09 |
| Total votes | 13,751 | 14.64 |

General election

2011 Springfield, Massachusetts mayoral general election results November 8, 2011
| Candidate | Votes | % |
|---|---|---|
| Domenic J. Sarno (incumbent) | 14,620 | 71.68 |
| Jose F. Tosado | 5,720 | 28.04 |
| Write-ins | 56 | 0.27 |
| Total votes | 20,396 | 21.81 |

== 2015 mayoral election ==
Springfield, Massachusetts mayoral election, 2015
- November 3, 2015
- Turnout: 16.07%
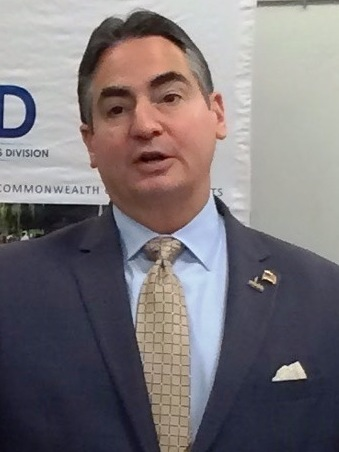

| Candidate | Domenic Sarno | Salvatore S. Circosta |
| Popular vote | 11,763 | 3,454 |
| Percentage | 76.80% | 22.55% |
Mayor before election
Domenic Sarno
Democratic
Elected mayor
Domenic Sarno
Democratic

The 2015 Springfield, Massachusetts mayoral election was held on November 3, 2015, and was preceded by a primary on September 8, 2015. Incumbent mayor Domenic Sarno won reelection to a third term.

=== Candidates ===
- Salvatore S. Circosta, member of Springfield Community Policing Board, business manager of a Catholic church, former business owner, former seminarian, former military chaplain, candidate for Springfield City Council in 2013
- Invelisse Gonzalez
- Michael Jones
- Johnnie Ray McKnight, former teacher
- Domenic J. Sarno, incumbent mayor since 2008
- Beverly L. Savage, candidate for mayor of New Haven, Connecticut in 1995

=== Campaign ===
Salvatore S. Circosta was politically conservative, closely tying his candidacy with his Catholicism. Early into his candidacy, Circosta publicly disclosed that he was a gay man. Circosta described himself as conservative on issues such as abortion rights and financial matters, but "progressive" on some issues such as gay rights.

=== Results ===
Primary

2015 Springfield, Massachusetts mayoral primary election results September 8, 2015
| Candidate | Votes | % |
|---|---|---|
| Domenic J. Sarno (incumbent) | 5,067 | 75.23 |
| Salvatore S. Circosta | 576 | 8.55 |
| Johnnie Ray McKnight | 488 | 7.25 |
| Invelisse Gonzalez | 202 | 3.00 |
| Beverly L. Savage | 187 | 2.78 |
| Michael Jones | 178 | 2.64 |
| Write-ins | 37 | 0.55 |
| Total votes | 6,735 | 7.12 |

General election

2015 Springfield, Massachusetts mayoral general election results November 3, 2015
| Candidate | Votes | % |
|---|---|---|
| Domenic J. Sarno (incumbent) | 11,763 | 76.80 |
| Salvatore S. Circosta | 3,454 | 22.55 |
| Write-ins | 100 | 0.65 |
| Total votes | 15,317 | 16.07 |

== 2019 mayoral election ==
Springfield, Massachusetts mayoral election, 2019
- November 5, 2019
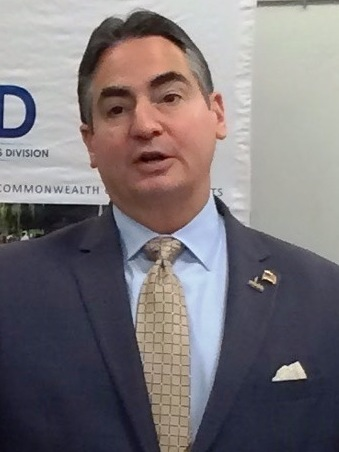

| Candidate | Domenic Sarno | Yolanda Cancel |
| Popular vote | 11,880 | 3,593 |
| Percentage | 76.54% | 23.15% |
Mayor before election
Domenic Sarno
Democratic
Elected mayor
Domenic Sarno
Democratic

The 2019 Springfield, Massachusetts mayoral election was held on November 5, 2019, and was preceded by a primary on September 10, 2019. It was held in the city of Springfield, Massachusetts, United States. Incumbent mayor Domenic Sarno won reelection to a fourth term.

By virtue of winning reelection to his fourth term, Sarno became poised to be the city's longest-serving mayor.

=== Candidates ===
- Yolanda Cancel, community organizer and candidate for Springfield City Council in 2007
- Jeffrey Donnelly, perennial candidate
- Linda Matys O'Connell, activist, League of Women Voters official, former journalist
- Domenic Sarno, incumbent mayor since 2008

=== Results ===
Primary

2019 Springfield, Massachusetts mayoral primary election results September 10, 2019
| Candidate | Votes | % |
|---|---|---|
| Domenic J. Sarno (incumbent) | 5,550 | 76.52 |
| Yolanda Cancel | 1,108 | 12.23 |
| Jeffery P. Donnelly | 300 | 8.47 |
| Linda Matys O'Connell | 281 | 1.46 |
| Write-ins | 14 | 0.34 |
| Total votes | 7,253 | |

General election

2019 Springfield, Massachusetts mayoral general election results November 5, 2019
| Candidate | Votes | % |
|---|---|---|
| Domenic J. Sarno (incumbent) | 11,880 | 76.54 |
| Yolanda Cancel | 3,593 | 23.15 |
| Write-ins | 49 | 0.32 |
| Total votes | 15,522 | |

== 2023 mayoral election ==
2023 Springfield, Massachusetts mayoral election
- November 7, 2023
- Turnout: 18.81%
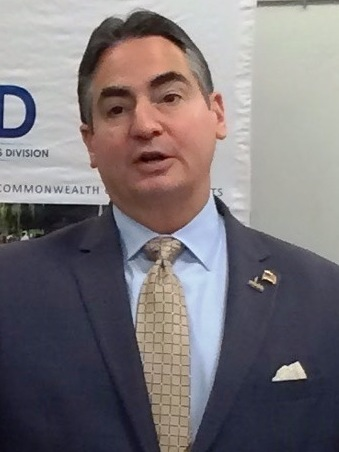

| Candidate | Domenic Sarno | Justin Hurst |
| Popular vote | 12,077 | 8,945 |
| Percentage | 57.11% | 42.30% |
- Sarno: 30–40% 40–50% 50–60% 60–70% Hurst: 30–40% 40–50% 50–60% 60–70% 70–80% Tie
Mayor before election
Domenic Sarno
Democratic
Elected mayor
Domenic Sarno
Democratic

The 2023 Springfield Massachusetts mayor election was held on November 7, 2023, and was preceded by a primary on September 12, 2023. Incumbent Domenic Sarno won reelection to a fifth term.

=== Candidates ===
- David Ciampi, psychotherapist
- Justin Hurst, Springfield city councilor
- Jesse Lederman, Springfield City Council president
- Orlando Ramos, Massachusetts State Representative
- Domenic Sarno, incumbent Springfield mayor

==== Endorsements ====
Justin Hurst

State legislators

- Adam Gomez, state senator from the Hampden district (2021-present)
- Orlando Ramos, state representative from the 9th Hampden district (2021-present)

Local officials

- Tracye Whitfield, Springfield at-large city councilor (2018-present)
- Zaida Govan, Springfield city councilor from the 8th ward (2022-present)
- LaTonia Monroe Naylor, Springfield School Committee member (2018-present)

Individuals

- David Ciampi, psychotherapist, former mayoral candidate
- Gumersindo Gomez, veterans activist, former Springfield city councilor from the 1st ward (2021)
Domenic Sarno

Newspapers

- The Republican

Labor unions

- Pioneer Valley Building Trades Council

=== Campaign ===
Nik DeCosta-Klipa of WBUR described Domenic Sarno as a relative "old-school, centrist Democrat" and his opponents as challenging him from the political left. He also described this as the largest field of prominent challengers that Sarno has faced for mayor.

=== Finances ===
| Candidate | Receipts | Expenditures |
|---|---|---|
| Domenic J. Sarno | $275,631.32 | $545,174.62 |
| Justin Hurst | $134,112.91 | $166,153.01 |
| Jesse Lederman | $69,724.82 | $88,593.25 |
| Orlando Ramos | $37,626.94 | $88,712.98 |
| David Ciampi | $36,928.93 | $41,117.31 |
| Total | $554,024.92 | $929,751.17 |

=== Results ===
Primary

2023 Springfield, Massachusetts mayoral primary election results September 12, 2023
| Candidate | Votes | % |
|---|---|---|
| Domenic J. Sarno (incumbent) | 7,120 | 47.79 |
| Justin Hurst | 4,292 | 28.81 |
| Orlando Ramos | 2,032 | 13.64 |
| Jesse Lederman | 1,344 | 9.02 |
| David Ciampi | 93 | 0.62 |
| Write-ins | 16 | 0.11 |
| Total votes | 14,897 | 13.49 |

General election

2023 Springfield, Massachusetts mayoral general election results November 7, 2023
| Candidate | Votes | % |
|---|---|---|
| Domenic J. Sarno (incumbent) | 12,077 | 57.11 |
| Justin Hurst | 8,945 | 42.30 |
| Write-ins | 125 | 0.59 |
| Total votes | 21,147 | 18.81 |
