= Domenic Sarno =

American politician (born 1963)

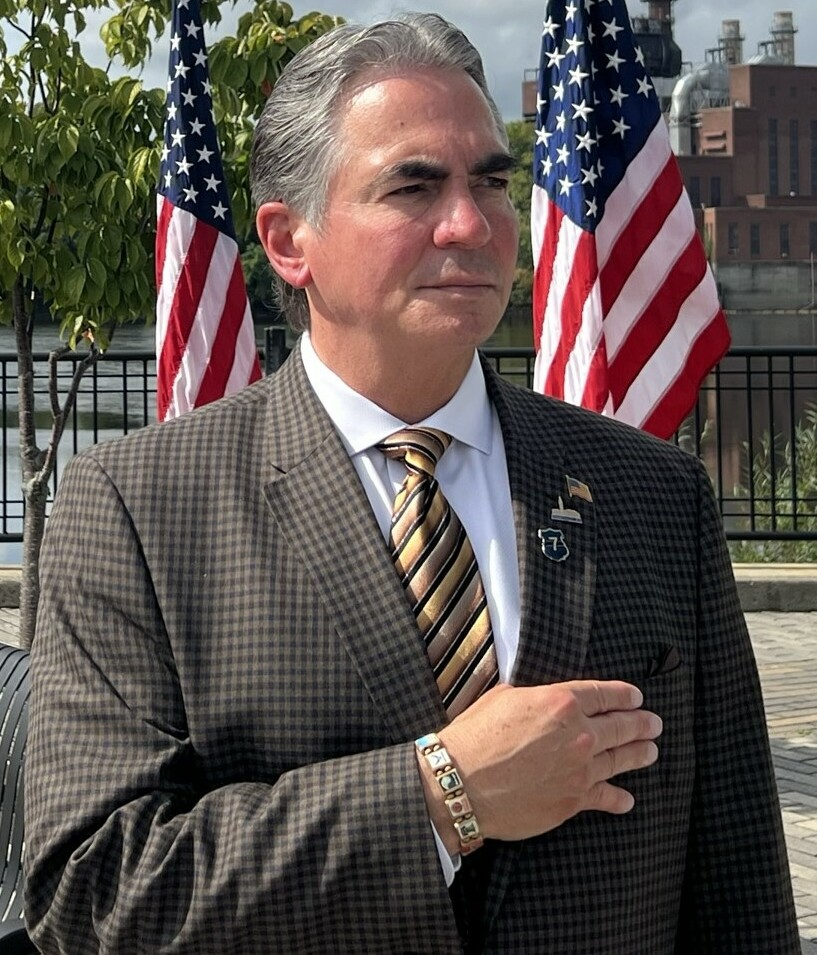
- Sarno in 2023

55th Mayor of Springfield
- Incumbent
- Assumed office January 7, 2008
- Preceded by: Charles Ryan

Member of the Springfield City Council; At-large
- In office 2000–2007

Personal details
- Born: May 4, 1963 (age 63) Springfield, Massachusetts, U.S.
- Party: Democratic
- Spouse: Carla Sarno
- Children: 2
- Education: Westfield State University (B.A.)
- Website: www.springfield-ma.gov/cos/mayor

Domenic J. Sarno (born May 4, 1963) is the current mayor of Springfield, Massachusetts. First elected in 2007, Sarno has won re-election five times since and is a member of the Democratic Party. Winning election to a fifth term overall in 2023 and the third four-year term, he is the longest-serving mayor in Springfield's history.

== Early life ==
Sarno was born in Springfield, Massachusetts to Alfonso and Clara Sarno, who were Italian immigrants and small business owners. He graduated from the High School of Commerce. He studied political science at American International College for some time, but ultimately graduated from Westfield State University with a degree in psychology. He is a practicing Roman Catholic.

Sarno worked as an aide to Springfield Mayor Mary Hurley from 1989 to 1991. From 1996 to 2002 he was an aide to Hampden County District Attorney William Bennett. Sarno later worked as executive director of the South End Community Center from 2002 to 2007. During this time, he also served as an at-large member of the Springfield City Council. Sarno was first elected to the city council in 1999, and he was subsequently elected to three more two-year terms.

== Mayoralty ==
=== Elections ===
In 2007, Sarno announced that he would challenge incumbent Mayor Charles Ryan, who was serving his fifth non-consecutive term in office. During the campaign, Sarno focused on Springfield's trash collection fee, while Ryan argued that he had helped to prevent the city from falling into bankruptcy. On November 6, 2007, Sarno won 53% of the vote to Ryan's 47%.

Sarno ran for reelection in 2009, facing City Councilor Bud Williams. Sarno received 69% of the vote to Williams’ 29%. In that same year, Springfield voters approved a change to the city's charter, which extended the mayor's term in office to four years. This provision did not, however, take effect until the 2011 municipal elections.

In 2011, Sarno won reelection to a four-year term. He defeated City Councilor Jose Tosado by winning 71% of the vote. While Tosado won several key labor union endorsements during the campaign, Sarno touted his fiscal management and response to the 2011 New England tornado outbreak.

In 2015 Sarno was reelected, defeating local business owner Salvatore Circosta with 77% of the vote, with Circosta winning 22.5%.

In 2019, Sarno won reelection, defeating challenger and local activist Yolanda Cancel with 77% of the vote to Cancel's 23%. With the expansion of terms to 4 years after 2011, following the 2019 election, Sarno became the longest-serving mayor in the city's history, a record preceded by Daniel B. Brunton in 1957.

=== Tenure ===
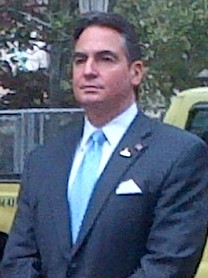
Sarno in 2012

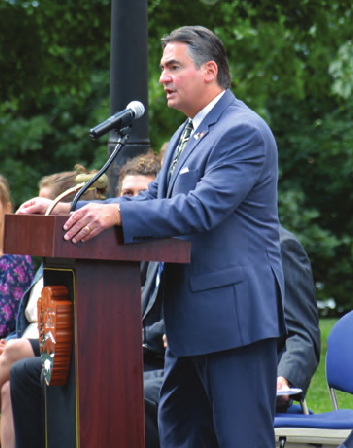
Sarno addresses a crowd at a naturalization ceremony at the Springfield Armory; though leading such ceremonies, Sarno has faced criticism from activists and Massachusetts Democrats for his stances against illegal immigration

When Sarno took office in 2007, Springfield was in the midst of a financial crisis. The city suffered from a shrinking industrial tax base, rising budget deficits, and the fact it had been downgraded to junk bond status by credit rating agencies. In 2004, the Massachusetts General Court and Governor Mitt Romney responded to this financial crisis by giving the city a no-interest $52 million loan. In return, a state-run Finance Control Board took authority over almost all municipal functions. During Sarno's first term in office, the city's financial standing improved, with Moody's Investors Service upgrading its bond rating. In January 2009, Governor Deval Patrick signed legislation disbanding the Finance Control Board and giving Springfield ten additional years to repay the loan.

Prior to elimination of the Finance Control Board, the body occasionally clashed with Sarno. Significantly, in 2007 the board voted in favor of conducting a full search for a new police commissioner after Edward A. Flynn left to become Chief of the Milwaukee Police Department. Sarno favored immediately appointing Springfield's Deputy Chief William Fitchet, who eventually won the position.

One of the most important moments of Sarno's second term came on June 1, 2011, when Springfield was struck by the 2011 New England tornado outbreak, which left three hundred people injured in the city and a significant amount of damage on Main Street. 500 people were left homeless and in temporary shelter in the MassMutual Center.

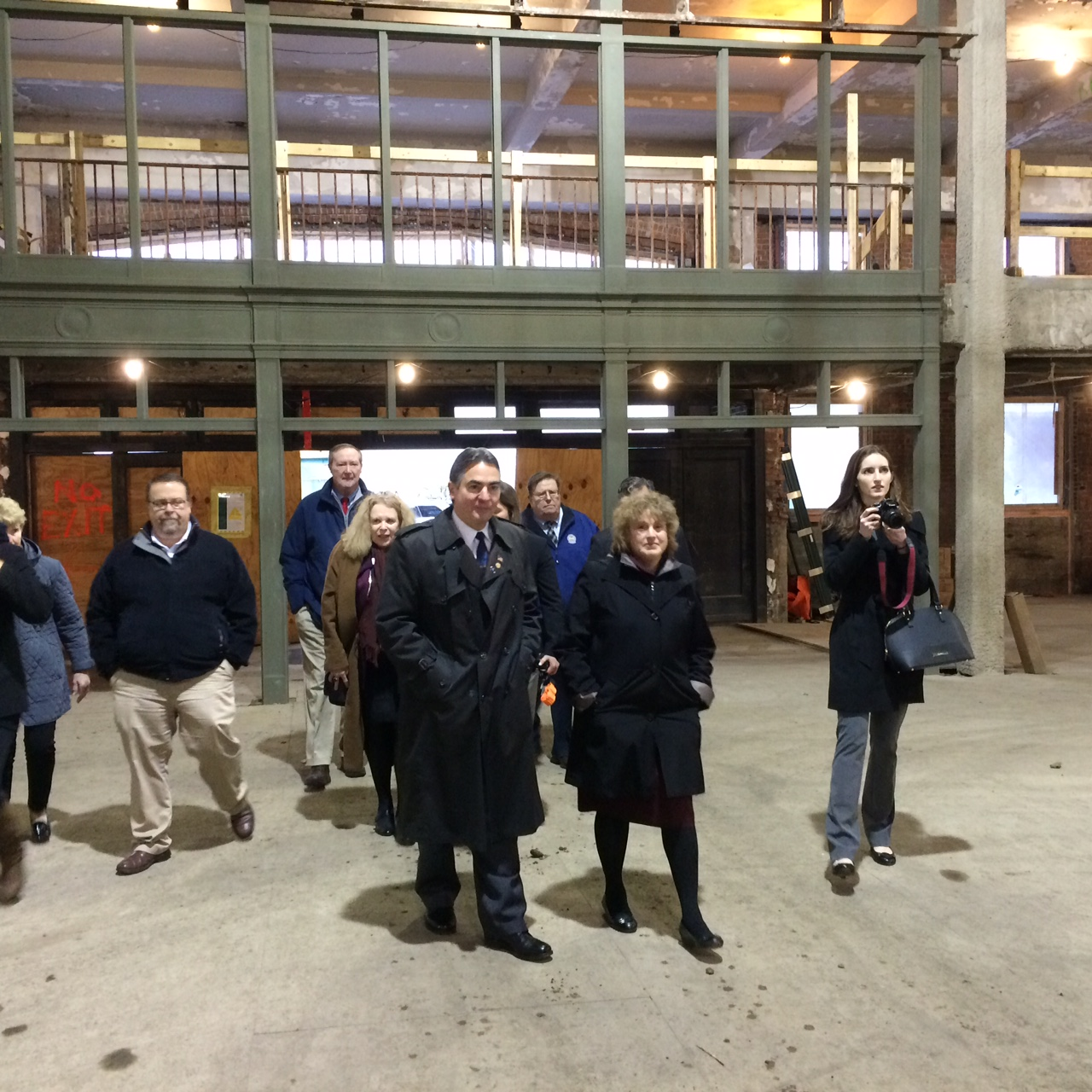
Mayor Sarno tours Springfield Union Station during its renovation with MA Secretary of Transportation, Stephanie Pollack, December 2015

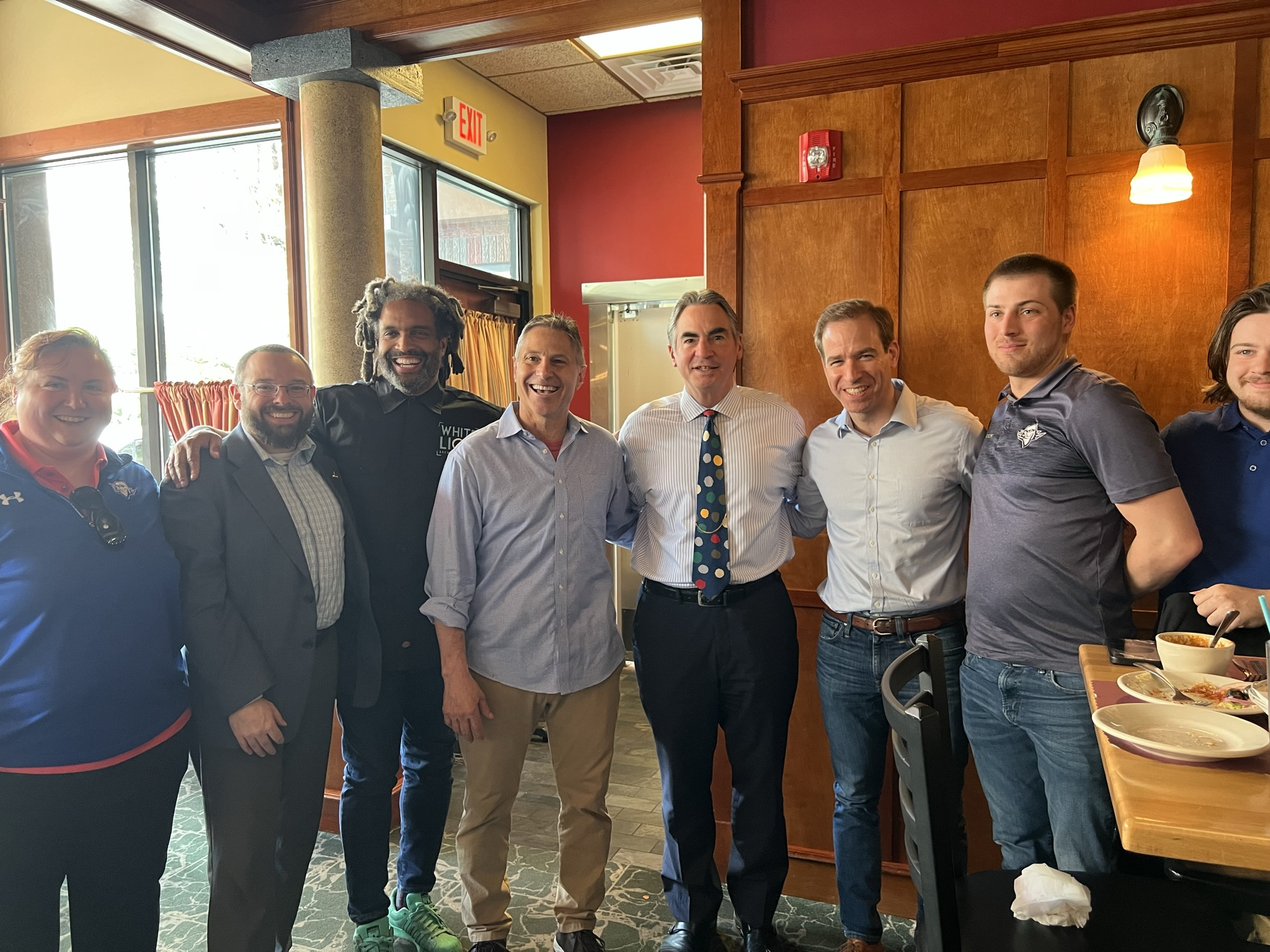
Mayor Sarno welcomes Hartford, CT Mayor Luke Bronin to the iconic Red Rose Pizzeria in downtown Springfield.

After Massachusetts passed an expanded gambling law in 2011, several casino companies began competing for the single casino license available for Western Massachusetts. Sarno's administration set a January 2013 deadline for companies to submit plans to the city. MGM Resorts International and Penn National Gaming met this deadline. In May 2013, Sarno selected MGM as the city's sole competitor for the Western Massachusetts casino license. As part of a host agreement, MGM pledged to pay the city $25 million per year in return for permission to build an $800 million resort in the city's South End.

== Electoral history ==
=== Mayor ===
2007 Springfield, Massachusetts mayoral election
Candidate	Votes	%
Domenic J. Sarno	11,096	52.54
Charles V. Ryan (incumbent)	9,964	47.18
Write-ins	61	0.29
Total votes	21,121	100

2009 Springfield, Massachusetts mayoral election
Candidate	Votes	%
Domenic J. Sarno (incumbent)	14,968	69.39
Bud L. Williams	6,418	29.75
Write-ins	185	0.86
Turnout	21,571	24.45%

2011 Springfield, Massachusetts mayoral election
Candidate	Primary election		General election	
Candidate	Votes	%	Votes	%
Domenic J. Sarno (incumbent)	8,271	60.15	14,620	71.68
Jose F. Tosado	3,191	23.21	5,720	28.04
Antoine E. Pepe	2,276	16.55		
Write-ins	13	0.09	56	0.27
Turnout	13,751	14.64	20,396	21.81

2015 Springfield, Massachusetts mayoral election
Candidate	Primary election		General election	
Candidate	Votes	%	Votes	%
Domenic J. Sarno (incumbent)	5,067	75.23	11,763	76.80
Salvatore S. Circosta	576	8.55	3,454	22.55
Johnnie Ray McKnight	488	7.25		
Invelisse Gonzalez	202	3.00		
Beverly L. Savage	187	2.78		
Michael Jones	178	2.64		
Write-ins	37	0.55	100	0.56
Turnout	6,735	7.12	15,317	16.07

2019 Springfield, Massachusetts mayoral election
Candidate	Primary election		General election	
Candidate	Votes	%	Votes	%
Domenic J. Sarno (incumbent)	5,550	76.52	11,880	76.54
Yolanda Cancel	1,108	12.23	3,593	23.15
Jeffery P. Donnelly	300	8.47		
Linda Matys O'Connell	281	1.46		
Write-ins	14	0.34	49	0.32
Turnout	7,253		15,522	

Political offices
Preceded by Charles Ryan	Mayor of Springfield, Massachusetts; 2008–present	Incumbent
