= We the People Party =

2024 American local political parties

We the People Party is the name of political third parties in the United States founded in January 2024 by Robert F. Kennedy Jr. to help obtain ballot access for his 2024 presidential campaign.

== Background ==
Kennedy, who was also running as an independent politician, created the parties to make it easier to obtain ballot access. Independent candidates require large numbers of signatures from voters to get on the ballot in most states. In some states that number is significantly lower for political parties. Registering a new political party in selected states reduced by 330,000 the total signatures needed to obtain ballot access in every state.

== Formation ==
Parties with that name were formed in California, Delaware, Hawaii, Mississippi, and North Carolina. Additionally, a party in Texas was created under the name of Texas Independent Party. Kennedy filed as an independent with the Texas Secretary of State.

Kennedy filed paperwork to create the party in California, Delaware, Hawaii, and North Carolina. Election officials in California, Delaware, Hawaii, and North Carolina confirmed that they had received a filing for the formation of We the People Parties in their states. Jane Nelson, the Secretary of State of Texas, also confirmed that filing for the formation of the Texas Independent Party had been received. As of June 19, 2024 officials in Mississippi had received some of the required documents, the remainder needed to be filed by September 6.

To obtain political party status in California, the We the People Party was required to have 75,000 registered members in the state. Delaware required 770 registered members to obtain political party status.

Kennedy supporters relaunched the party in September 2025, initially focusing on New York state.

== Ballot access ==
On February 29, 2024, the We the People Party received the necessary number of signatures to obtain ballot access in Hawaii, which was certified by the Hawaii Office of Elections. Kennedy withdrew his name from the ballot in September, and his name did not appear.

On April 1, the Kennedy campaign claimed that they had received enough signatures to obtain ballot access for the We the People Party in North Carolina, which was certified by the North Carolina State Board of Elections on July 16.

On April 28, Kennedy received the nomination of the American Independent Party, which meant that the We the People Party no longer needed to obtain ballot access in California.

On May 7, Kennedy received the nomination of the Independent Party of Delaware, which meant that the We the People Party no longer needed to obtain ballot access in Delaware. At the time of the nomination, the We the People Party of Delaware only had 175 of the 769 needed registered members.

On August 8, a lawsuit was filed in Pennsylvania "to set aside the nomination papers of Robert F. Kennedy, Jr. and Nicole Shanahan as the We The People Candidates for President and Vice President of the United States".

In 2026, the party lost its recognized minor party status in Oregon after failing to meet the minimum requirements for voter registration or electoral performance. This removed the party's legal ability to nominate candidates in the state.

== Other users of "We the People" party designation ==
"We the People" has previously been used as a party designation by other candidates. New York State Senator Joseph Addabbo Jr. was listed on the ballot as representing the We the People party in addition to the Democratic Party in his 2022 election. New Jersey gubernatorial candidate Vincent Ross used the same party label in the 2017 New Jersey gubernatorial election. Abraham Kasparian Jr. in 2022 was on the ballot for the Massachusetts legislature using We The People party.

In 2024 candidate Shelby Pikachu Billionaire was on the ballot for U.S. Senate in Hawaii using the We the People Party designation, receiving 1.8% of the vote.

In 2026 Da'Shone Hughey ran for Congress in New Jersey's 8th Congressional district as an "Independent under the banner 'We the People'", appearing on the ballot with "We the People" party designation.
