= Christopher Asselin =

American politician (born 1969)

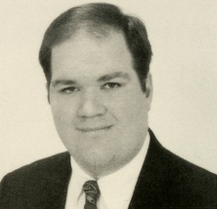

Christopher P. Asselin (born 1969) is an American former politician.

== Early life ==
Christopher Asselin was born on March 10, 1969, one of five children to parents Raymond Sr. and Janet Asselin. He graduated from Western New England College with a bachelor of arts degree. He later earned a master's of education degree at Westfield State College. Christopher Asselin is married to Merylina S. Asselin.

== Public office ==
Asselin first ran for public office in 1999, losing a Democratic Party primary to Jack Keough prior to a special election called to replace Dennis M. Murphy on the Massachusetts House of Representatives. Asselin defeated Keogh in a party primary the next year, and succeeded him in office. Asselin won reelection uncontested in 2002.

== Investigation ==
In September 2002, Christopher Asselin's house was raided during a joint investigation by the Federal Bureau of Investigation, the Internal Revenue Service, and the United States Department of Housing. Christopher Asselin's father Raymond Asselin ran the Springfield Housing Authority from the 1970s to May 2003.

Multiple members of the Asselin family were charged with stealing a total near $1 million in goods and services from the Springfield Housing Authority. Some of the money contributed to Christopher Asselin's 2002 campaign. The wife of Christopher Asselin's brother Raymond Jr. was credited with aiding the federal investigation. Raymond Jr. had been Christopher's campaign treasurer in 2000, and turned over those responsibilities to their mother Janet in 2002. Janet was charged with falsifying finance reports during the 2002 campaign cycle. Another brother, Joseph, was indicted for mailing several thousand dollars of campaign literature on Christopher's behalf though the insurance company at which Joseph worked, in 2002.

Christopher Asselin was charged for using funds to produce and distribute campaign literature, and also made home improvements, as did a number of his relatives. Asselin contested the 2004 Democratic Party primary for his state house district, losing to Sean Curran. Asselin pleaded guilty to the charges in September 2006. After serving an 18-month sentence in prison, Asselin was released in 2008. He ran in the 2010 state legislative elections, and did not unseat Curran.

Though the Springfield City Council granted Asselin a permit to establish a used car dealership in April 2013, the Springfield License Commission rejected his request for a license.
