= Benjamin Swan =

American politician (1933–2026)

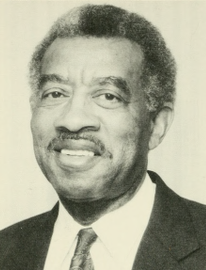
- Swan in 1995

Member of the Massachusetts House of Representatives from the 11th Hampden district
- In office January 7, 1995 – January 4, 2017
- Succeeded by: Bud Williams

Personal details
- Born: September 18, 1933 Belzoni, Mississippi, U.S.
- Died: May 25, 2026 (aged 92)
- Party: Democratic Party
- Education: Howard University; University of Massachusetts Amherst

Benjamin Swan (September 18, 1933 – May 25, 2026) was an American politician who served in the Massachusetts House of Representatives, and represented the 11th Hampden District from 1995 to 2016.

== Education and career ==
Swan attended Howard University, and received a Master's in education from the University of Massachusetts-Amherst in 1977.

On February 6, 2014, Swan was one of five members of the legislative body to vote against the expulsion of State Representative Carlos Henriquez, who had been convicted of assault.

Before being elected a state legislator, Swan served for a time as the president of the Springfield, Massachusetts NAACP and unsuccessfully ran for mayor of Springfield in the 1991 and 1993 mayoral elections Swan was a black community activist, and had a career as a management and education consultant. He was an Honorary Paramount Chief of Bo & Kwila in Nimba County, Liberia.

== Personal life and death ==
Benjamin was married to Alice, who brought two children from a previous marriage, William ("Billy") and Martha. Benjamin and Alice had three children together: Virginia, Halbert, and Benjamin Jr. Following that marriage, Benjamin married Bobbie Tate in 1972, and they had one son, Scott. Benjamin was also the father of two other children, Jonathan Jarret and Lisa. He was a member of the American Legion, Arise for Social Justice, Black Men of Greater Springfield, and numerous fraternal organizations. Swan died on May 25, 2026, at the age of 92.

== Legacy ==
The Benjamin Swan Elementary School in Springfield, established in 2023 to serve a pre-K through 5th grade student body, was named in Swan's honor.

== See also ==
- Massachusetts House of Representatives' 12th Hampden district
