= Frank Harlan Freedman =

American judge (1924–2003)

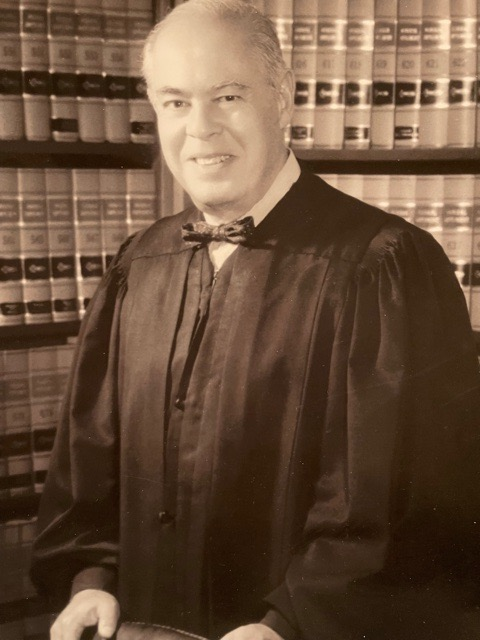

Senior Judge of the United States District Court for the District of Massachusetts
- In office January 1, 1992 – August 21, 2003

Judge of the United States Foreign Intelligence Surveillance Court
- In office May 30, 1990 – May 18, 1994
- Appointed by: William Rehnquist
- Preceded by: Conrad K. Cyr
- Succeeded by: John F. Keenan

Chief Judge of the United States District Court for the District of Massachusetts
- In office 1986–1992
- Preceded by: Andrew A. Caffrey
- Succeeded by: Joseph L. Tauro

Judge of the United States District Court for the District of Massachusetts
- In office October 17, 1972 – January 1, 1992
- Appointed by: Richard Nixon
- Preceded by: Levin H. Campbell
- Succeeded by: Michael Ponsor

Mayor of Springfield, Massachusetts
- In office 1968–1972
- Preceded by: Charles Ryan
- Succeeded by: Theodore Dimauro (acting)

Personal details
- Born: Frank Harlan Freedman; December 15, 1924 Springfield, Massachusetts, U.S.
- Died: August 21, 2003 (aged 78) Springfield, Massachusetts, U.S.
- Party: Republican
- Education: Boston University School of Law (LLB, LLM)

Frank Harlan Freedman (December 15, 1924 – August 21, 2003) was a United States district judge of the United States District Court for the District of Massachusetts.

== Education and career ==
Born in Springfield, Massachusetts, Freedman was a lieutenant in the United States Navy during World War II, from 1943 to 1946. He received a Bachelor of Laws from Boston University School of Law in 1949, and a Master of Laws from that school in 1950. He was in private practice in Springfield from 1950 to 1968, and served on the Springfield City Council from 1960 to 1967. He was an assistant state attorney general of Massachusetts and Chief of the Springfield Office from 1963 to 1967. He was the Mayor of Springfield from 1968 to 1972, having won the 1967, 1969, and 1971 mayoral races.

== Federal judicial service ==
On August 14, 1972, Freedman was nominated by President Richard Nixon to a seat on the United States District Court for the District of Massachusetts vacated by Judge Levin H. Campbell. Freedman was confirmed by the United States Senate on October 12, 1972, and received his commission on October 17, 1972. He served as Chief Judge from 1986 to 1992, assuming senior status on January 1, 1992, and serving in that capacity until his death on August 21, 2003, in Springfield.

== See also ==
- List of Jewish American jurists

== Sources ==
Legal offices
Preceded by Levin H. Campbell	Judge of the United States District Court for the District of Massachusetts; 1972–1992	Succeeded by Michael Ponsor
Preceded by Andrew A. Caffrey	Chief Judge of the United States District Court for the District of Massachusetts; 1986–1992	Succeeded by Joseph L. Tauro
Preceded by Conrad K. Cyr	Judge of the United States Foreign Intelligence Surveillance Court; 1990–1994	Succeeded by John F. Keenan
