= Athan Catjakis =

American politician (1931–2022)

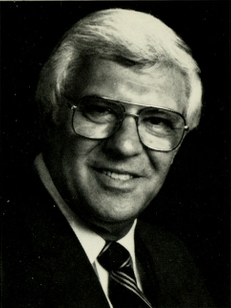

Athan Catjakis (May 22, 1931 – January 20, 2022) was an American politician.

Catjakis was born in Springfield, Massachusetts, and graduated from Springfield Technical High School. He served in the United States Army during the Korean War.

A member of the Democratic Party, Catjakis began his political career as chief of staff to mayor William C. Sullivan. Sullivan subsequently appointed Catjakis to Springfield Housing Authority. In 1979, Catjakis became a legislative aide to Arthur J. McKenna. Catjakis worked for McKenna for five years, until McKenna announced his retirement from politics in 1984. Catjakis ran for McKenna's open seat on the Massachusetts House of Representatives, and served until the end of his fourth term in 1992, when he was succeeded by his former legislative aide Dennis M. Murphy.

He died on January 20, 2022, in Agawam, Massachusetts, at the age of 90.
