= Massachusetts House of Representatives' 9th Hampden district =

American legislative district

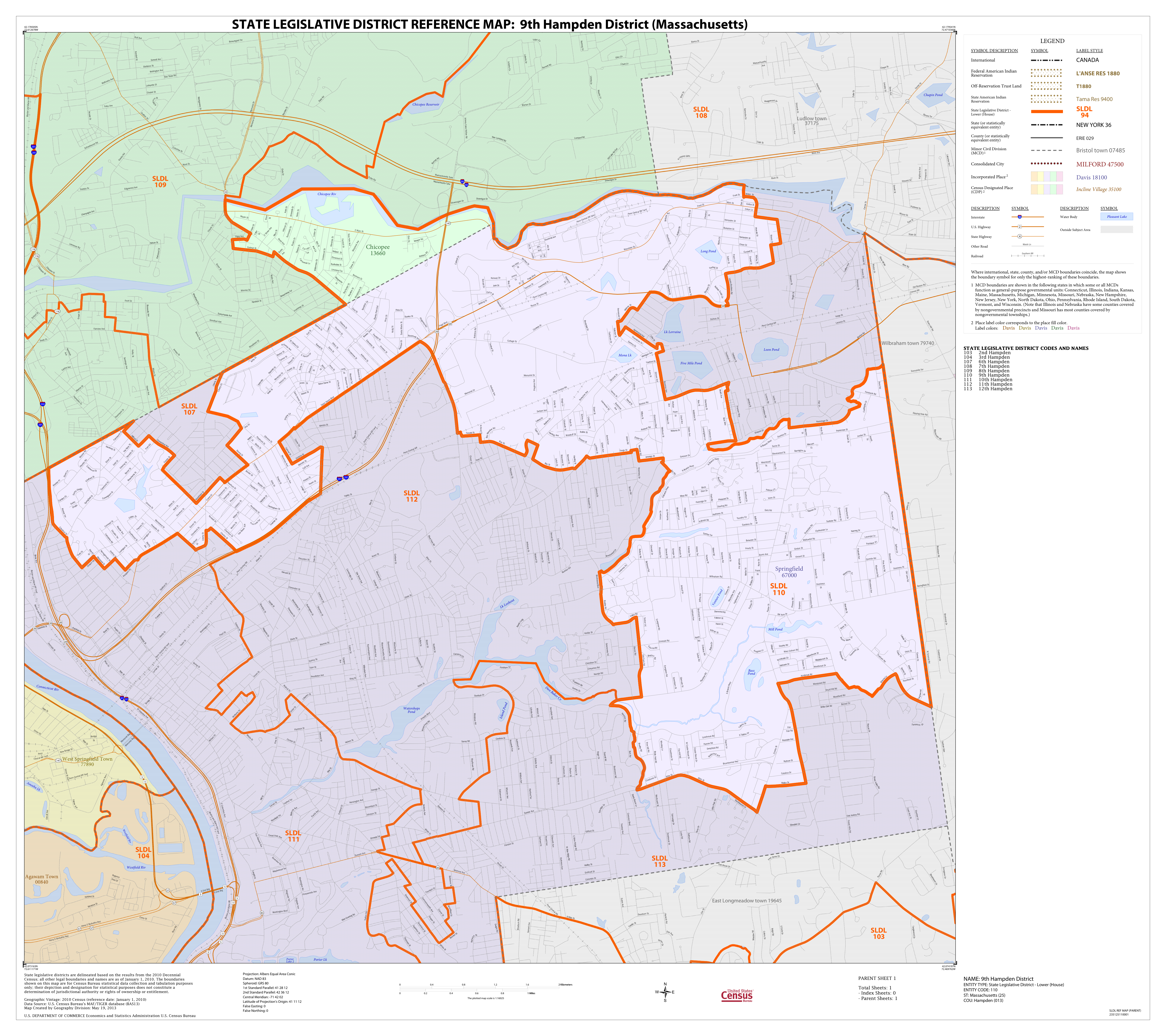
Map of Massachusetts House of Representatives' 9th Hampden district, based on the 2010 United States census.

Massachusetts House of Representatives' 9th Hampden district in the United States is one of 160 legislative districts included in the lower house of the Massachusetts General Court. It covers part of Hampden County. Democrat José Tosado of Springfield has represented the district since 2015. Candidates for this district seat in the 2020 primary included Denise Hurst. Candidates Orlando Ramos and Robert Underwood have been selected to run in the general election in November 2020.

== Locales represented ==
The district includes the following localities:

- part of Chicopee
- part of Springfield

The current district geographic boundary overlaps with those of the Massachusetts Senate's 1st Hampden and Hampshire district and Hampden district.

=== Former locales ===
The district previously covered:

- Blandford, circa 1872
- Chester, circa 1872
- Montgomery, circa 1872
- Russell, circa 1872
- Tolland, circa 1872

== Representatives ==
- Andrew J. Marvin, circa 1858
- Elisha F. Miner, circa 1859
- Henry Clark, circa 1888
- Hugh J. Lacey, circa 1920
- Wendell Phillips Chamberlain, circa 1951
- Rudy Chmura, circa 1975
- Christopher Asselin 2001–2005
- Sean Curran 2005–2015
- Jose Tosado, 2015–2021
- Orlando Ramos, 2021 present

== See also ==
- List of Massachusetts House of Representatives elections
- Other Hampden County districts of the Massachusetts House of Representatives: 1st, 2nd, 3rd, 4th, 5th, 6th, 7th, 8th, 10th, 11th, 12th
- Hampden County districts of the Massachusett Senate: Berkshire, Hampshire, Franklin, and Hampden; Hampden; 1st Hampden and Hampshire; 2nd Hampden and Hampshire
- List of Massachusetts General Courts
- List of former districts of the Massachusetts House of Representatives

== Images ==
Portraits of legislators

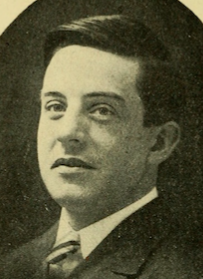
Francis Quigley

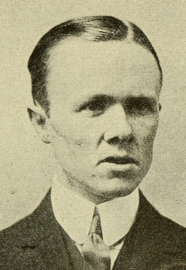
John Murphy

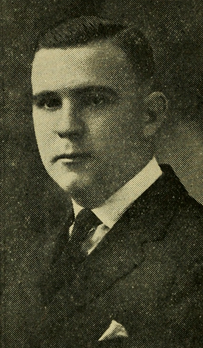
Joseph Francis Kelly

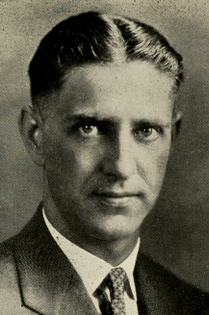
Ralph Clampit

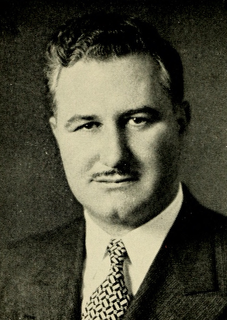
William Barry

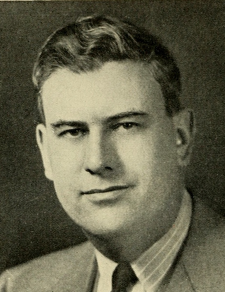
Wendell Phillips Chamberlain

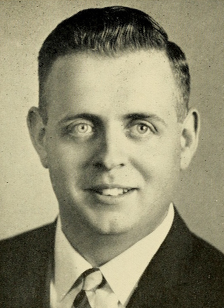
John O'Brien

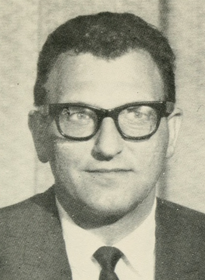
Rudy Chmura

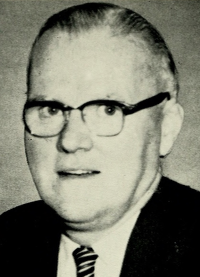
Arthur James McKenna

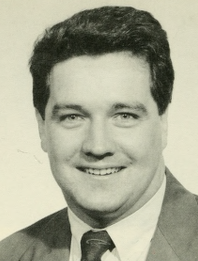
Dennis Murphy

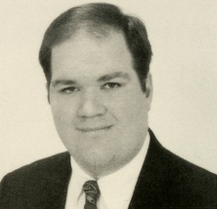
Christopher Asselin

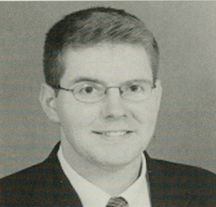
Sean Curran
