= Bud Williams =

Massachusetts politician

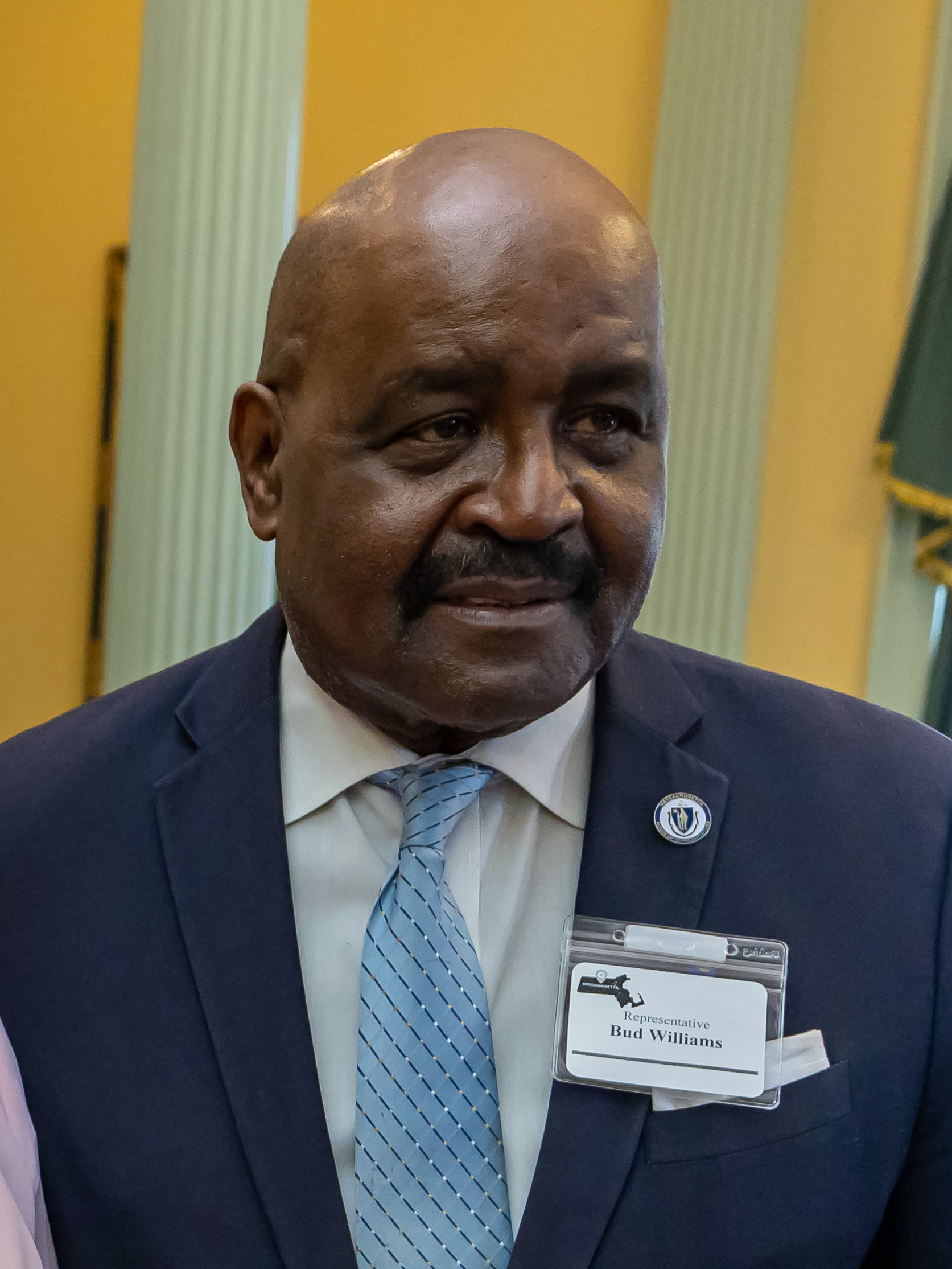
- Williams, in 2024

Member of the Massachusetts House of Representatives from the 11th Hampden district
- Incumbent
- Assumed office January 4, 2017
- Preceded by: Benjamin Swan

Member of the Springfield City Council
- In office 2011–2017
- In office 1993–2008

Personal details
- Born: 1947 or 1948 (age 77–78)
- Party: Democratic

Bud L. Williams (born 1947 or 1948) is an American politician who serves as a state representative for the 11th Hampden District in the Massachusetts House of Representatives. He represents the city of Springfield. Williams serves as the Vice Chair of the House Committee on Redistricting, and on the House Committee on Ways and Means, the Joint Committee on Economic Development and Emerging Technologies, the Joint Committee on Education, and the Joint Committee on Ways and Means.

He is a member of the Massachusetts Black and Latino Legislative Caucus.

Williams was born in 1947 or 1948. Before being elected to the state house, Williams was a member of the Springfield City Council, serving two tenures. He first served on the City Council from 1993 to 2008, and again served from 2011 to 2017. After being elected to the state house, he decided that he would continue to coincidently serve out the remainder of his term on the City Council, but not seek reelection afterwards.

In 2002 he ran unsuccessfully for State Representative, losing the Democratic primary for the 11th Hampden district seat to Benjamin Swan. In 2009, he challenged incumbent mayor of Springfield Domenic Sarno, losing the mayoral election 14,968 votes to 6,418. Before being elected to the City Council, he had run unsuccessfully for it in 1989 and 1993.

In early 2023, Williams cosponsored a bill to allow Massachusetts prisoners to earn time off from their sentences by immediately forfeiting some of their vital organs and/or bone marrow to the state.

== See also ==
- 2019–2020 Massachusetts legislature
- 2021–2022 Massachusetts legislature
