= Sean Curran (politician) =

American politician

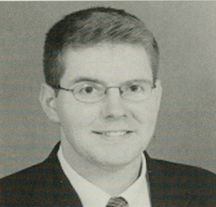
- Portrait of Sean Curran

Member of the Massachusetts House of Representatives from the 9th Hampden district
- In office 2005 – January 7, 2015
- Preceded by: Christopher Asselin
- Succeeded by: Jose Tosado

Personal details
- Born: August 23, 1977 (age 49) Springfield, Massachusetts
- Party: Democratic
- Education: Saint Anselm College; Suffolk University Law School
- Occupation: Attorney; Politician

Sean Curran (born August 23, 1977, in Springfield, Massachusetts) is an American politician who represented the 9th Hampden District in the Massachusetts House of Representatives from 2005 to 2015. After six terms he declined to seek re-election; his ended on January 7, 2015.
