= Thomas J. O'Connor =

American politician

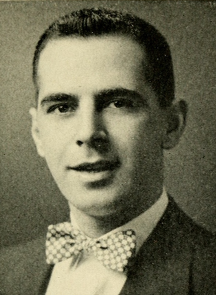
- O'Connor c. 1953

Mayor of Springfield, Massachusetts
- In office 1958–1961
- Preceded by: Daniel B. Brunton
- Succeeded by: Charles Ryan

Hampden County, Massachusetts Commissioner
- In office 1981–1996
- Preceded by: Richard S. Thomas
- Succeeded by: Abraham Kasparian

Member of the Massachusetts House of Representatives from the 5th Hampden District
- In office 1953–1958

Personal details
- Born: July 27, 1925 Springfield, Massachusetts
- Died: September 11, 1996 (aged 71) Springfield, Massachusetts
- Party: Democratic
- Occupation: Lawyer

Thomas Joseph O'Connor Jr. (July 27, 1925 – September 11, 1996) was an American politician who served as mayor of Springfield, Massachusetts.

== Early life ==
O'Connor was born on July 27, 1925, in Springfield. He was one of seven children of milkman Thomas J. O'Connor Sr. and grew up in Springfield's Hungry Hill neighborhood. O'Connor was part of a large family, he had more than 50 cousins that lived in the Springfield area, many of whom worked on his campaigns. His relatives included the O'Connor, Moriarty, Fitzgerald, and Martinelli families of Springfield. Never married, O'Connor lived in Springfield with a brother and two sisters.

O'Connor attended Springfield Classical High School, where he won class president. He received a four-year scholarship to Amherst College, where he also served as class president. He went on to attend Georgetown University Law School on a scholarship. In 1951 O'Connor became associated in a law firm with his brother Bernard, cousin S. Thomas Martinelli, and former Hampden Counrt District Attorney Thomas F. Moriarty. Moriarty was O'Connor's political mentor and Martinelli worked as O'Connor's campaign manager when he ran for U.S. Senate.

== Political career ==
=== State representative ===
O'Connor began his political career in 1952 as a candidate for the Massachusetts House of Representatives seat in the 5th Hampden District. He finished first in the fourteen candidate Democratic primary, which was tantamount to election.

=== Mayor of Springfield ===
In 1957, O'Connor swept all 68 of the city's precincts to defeated 12-year incumbent Daniel B. Brunton for the Democratic nomination for mayor of Springfield. He then beat Republican C. Clement Easton 31,561 votes to 20,826 in the general election. At 32 years old he was the youngest mayor ever elected in city history. In 1959 he easily defeated Brunton in a primary rematch 21,975 votes to 6,630 and Republican Paul E. Affleck and Brunton, who ran as an independent, 39,409 votes to Affleck's 11,424 and Brunton's 1,910. During the campaign he received the endorsement of The Springfield Union, a Republican newspaper.

During his tenure as Mayor, O'Connor oversaw a downtown road system and urban renewal project that received $3 million in federal funds. Due to these funds he was also able to lower the city's tax rate. In 1959 the University of Massachusetts' bureau of government research named Springfield "the outstanding city in the Commonwealth".

=== U.S. Senate campaign ===
On June 15, 1960, O'Connor announced he would challenge Governor Foster Furcolo for the Democratic nomination for United States Senate seat held by Leverett Saltonstall. Furcolo defeated O'Connor by a 3 to 1 margin at the Democratic State Convention, but O'Connor decided to remain in the race. In the primary, O'Connor upset Furcolo 48% to 39% with Edmund C. Buckley received the remaining 13%. O'Connor was able to sweep the western part of the state and top Furcolo by 10,000 in Boston.

During the general election, O'Connor contrasted his youth to Saltonstall's age, calling him "yesterday's senator" and "The Late George Apley of Massachusetts politics" and attacked the senator for "fail[ing] to act for the working man". Saltonstall in turn criticized O'Connor's campaign for lacking substance. After refusing to debate O'Connor, Saltonstall stated "If my opponent would express his opinions of some of the vital national and international issues, I would then consider whether I would debate on these subjects or not". Saltonstall defeated O'Connor 1,358,556 votes to 1,050,725 to hold on to his Senate seat.

=== Defeat for reelection ===
A 1960 reassessment of all of real estate in the city led to a furor when 1/3 of the Springfield's homeowners saw increases over their 1959 tax. On October 11, 1960, 4,500 residents attended a meeting at Springfield Auditorium where members of the Board of Assessors attempted to explain the tax increase. Each member was booed off the stage before they could speak and O'Connor, who had no role in the property reassessment, failed to quiet the crowd and police were called in. O'Connor planned to cut 578 jobs from the 1961 budget in order to reduce the city's taxes, however he reversed this decision due to a lack of public support.

In 1961, O'Connor faced eight challengers in the city's first non-partisian election. He finished first in the preliminary election with 34% of the vote. In the general election, attorney Charles V. Ryan upset O'Connor 28,999 (52%) votes to 26,271 (48%). Two weeks after O'Connor's loss, the city's percentage assessment system, which had been a major issue during the campaign, was declared unconstitutional by the Massachusetts Supreme Judicial Court.

=== County Commissioner ===
In 1980, O'Connor defeated incumbent Richard S. Thomas to win a seat on the Hampden County Commission. He was reelected in 1984, 1988, and 1992.

=== Run for district attorney ===
In 1990, Hampden County District Attorney Matthew J. Ryan, Jr. retired and O'Connor, his longtime friend, was seen as his favored successor. During the campaign, O'Connor tried to distance himself from the scandal-plagued Ryan by contrasting his liberal positions on the death penalty, affirmative action, and the war on drugs to those of the conservative Ryan. O'Connor spent $200,000 of his own money and turned over half of his campaign fund to noted political consultant Joseph Napolitan. O'Connor pledged to only serve two terms, although according to The Boston Globe's Kevin Cullen, given O'Connor age, smoking habit, and recovery from a near-fatal illness several years before "even his friends say they would be surprised if O'Connor would or could serve more than one".

O'Connor was seen as a co-front runner with William M. Bennett. Bennett, the more conservative candidate, was able to attract the majority of financial contributors and campaign volunteers, as well as endorsement from former federal prosecutors, Ryan's former assistants, and Judd Carhart, the president of the state district attorneys' association. The other two Democratic candidates Eugene J. Mulcahy and Michael T. Kogut, were described by Cullen as "credible candidates" who were "unable to raise a fraction of the money that O'Connor and Bennett have". The race ended up being close with Bennett winning by 513 votes. O'Connor finished in fourth place with 22% of the vote to Bennett's 27%, Kogut's 26%, and Mulcahy's 25%. O'Connor believed his defeat was due to Ryan's support of his campaign, explaining that "The people who supported Matty would ordinarily support me, but they didn't like my liberal positions and the liberals were suspicious of me because of my friendship with Matty."

== Death ==
On September 11, 1996, O'Connor died following a long illness. At the time of his death, O'Connor was running for reelection to the Hampden County Commission.

== See also ==
- 1953–1954 Massachusetts legislature
- 1955–1956 Massachusetts legislature

Party political offices
Preceded by Foster Furcolo	Democratic nominee for U.S. Senator from Massachusetts (Class 2); 1960	Succeeded by Endicott Peabody
