= Abraham Kasparian =

American politician

Hampden County, Massachusetts Commissioner
- In office 1996–1998
- Preceded by: Thomas J. O'Connor
- Succeeded by: Government abolished

Abraham Kasparian Jr. is an American politician who served on the Hampden County Commission from 1996 to 1998. In 2002 he was convicted of attempted murder after he stabbed his wife in a pizza parlor. While in jail he was awarded $311,000 in a civil suit related to his campaign for county commissioner.

== Political career ==
In 1996, Kasparian ran for a seat on the Hampden County Commission. On September 11, 1996, one of the incumbents, Thomas J. O'Connor, died, which left Kasparian and the other incumbent, Richard S. Thomas, unopposed. In 1997 Kasparian and the commission pitched a proposal to the New England Patriots for a new stadium on a site in Agawam, Massachusetts. This was one of many proposals submitted after plans for a South Boston stadium fell through. On July 1, 1998, the Hampden County Government was dismantled and the commission was eliminated. Kasparian filed suit challenging the Massachusetts General Court's authority to dismantle counties, but the suit was dismissed.

In 1998, Kasparian ran as an independent for the 8th District seat on the Massachusetts Governor's Council. He received 8% of the vote. In 1999 he finished fourth in the Agawam mayoral race with 1% of the vote. In 2000 he ran as independent for the Hampden district seat in the Massachusetts Senate. He lost to incumbent Linda Melconian 86% to 14%.

Kasparian later moved to Yarmouth, Massachusetts and served on the town's finance committee. In 2020 he was “Independent Unifying Thinking” candidate for Barnstable County commissioner. He finished a distant fourth place with 6% of the vote in an election where the top two candidates won. Kasparian in was on the ballot in 2022 for the Massachusetts legislature.

== Legal problems ==
During the 1996 county commissioner's race, Kasparian's criminal record was leaked to one of his opponents, Richard S. Thomas, who then turned it over to the Union-News. The record showed that since 1972, Kasparian had been charged 19 times, including charges related to an attack with a knife on a business partner that he had been acquitted of. Most of the charges had been dismissed, but he did receive a six-month suspended sentence in 1972 for fraudulently accepting $900 in welfare payments. Kasparian sued Thomas and two court officers for violating Massachusetts' state's Criminal Offender Record Information (CORI) laws by leaking his criminal record. The case finally went to trial in 2014 and Kasparian was awarded $311,000.

In 2000, Kasparian was jailed after judge William Abraskin found him in contempt of court. Kasparian had been ordered to make repairs an apartment building in Springfield, Massachusetts he owned as a result of a two-year court case. After Kasparian had failed to begin work despite racking up $2,100 in $100-a-day fines, Abraskin jailed him in order to get him to comply.

On July 22, 2002, Kasparian met with his wife at an Agawam pizza parlor. During the meeting, Kasparian allegedly begged his wife not to divorce him before attacking her with a butcher knife he brought to the restaurant. On August 2 he was charged with attempted murder, assault and battery with a dangerous weapon, and domestic assault. He was found guilty and received a 12 to 15-year sentence. He was released from prison on January 6, 2016. As of 2020 he works as a driver for an auto parts company.
