= Charles Ryan (mayor) =

American politician (1927–2021)

- Ryan in 2003

Mayor of Springfield
- In office 1962–1968
- Preceded by: Thomas J. O'Connor
- Succeeded by: Frank Harlan Freedman
- In office 2004–2008
- Preceded by: Michael Albano
- Succeeded by: Domenic Sarno

Personal details
- Born: September 15, 1927 Springfield, Massachusetts, U.S.
- Died: October 18, 2021 (aged 94)
- Party: Independent

Charles V. Ryan (September 15, 1927 – October 18, 2021) was an American politician who served as Mayor of Springfield, Massachusetts, from 1962 to 1968, and again from 2004 to 2008.

Ryan served as the city's mayor during the 1960s for three terms and for two additional terms beginning in 2004, making him the only Springfield mayor to serve in two different centuries. His terms in the 1960s occurred during a time of civil unrest. His administration’s controversial urban renewal projects resulted in dissolution of residential neighborhoods in the city’s North End and demolished the house at 51 Franklin Street, where the abolitionist John Brown resided while living in Springfield. Unsuccessful in preventing the closure of the Springfield Armory, which was a major economic blow to Springfield, Ryan attempted to blame the development on Congressman Edward P. Boland. Ryan ran against Boland for Congress in 1968, but was defeated in a landslide.

As a private citizen he became a prominent attorney and continued to be active in public affairs, serving as a member of the downtown economic development group Springfield Central and leading efforts to successfully defeat attempts to institute casino gambling. He also led successful efforts to place the privately owned Springfield libraries under public control.

Ryan's second act in Springfield's politics offered a twist on the well-known maxim from Karl Marx's The Eighteenth Brumaire of Louis Bonaparte, where Marx amplifies and extends Hegel's claim that particular historical forces occur twice, suggesting that they arrive "first as tragedy and then as farce."

He attempted to return to the mayoralty in 1995 but lost to city councilor Michael J. Albano. Ryan was elected mayor in 2003 following the decision of Albano not to seek reelection. He defeated the Albano endorsed State Senator Linda Melconian in a campaign that focused on the numerous corruption scandals of the Albano years. In November 2005, Ryan won reelection defeating the city's School Committee Vice-President, Thomas Ashe. On April 12, 2007, Ryan announced that he would run for re-election in the city's 2007 mayoral election and stated that this would be his final run. He lost this election to City Councilor Domenic Sarno.

Ryan died following a short illness on October 18, 2021, at the age of 94.

== Electoral history ==
1961 Springfield, Massachusetts mayoral election
Candidate	Primary election		General election	
Candidate	Votes	%	Votes	%
Charles Ryan	6,764	31.77	28,999	52.28
Thomas J. O'Connor (incumbent)	14,563	34.54	26,471	47.72
Raymond N. Tuller Jr.	7,874	18.67		
John P. Lynch	5,554	13.17		
Armand N. Tancrati	3,214	7.62		
Arthur J. McKenna	1,282	3.04		
Norman E. Cowles	177	0.42		
Bernard M. Lapointe	112	0.27		
Arbold R. Craven	97	0.23		
Total	42,168	100	55,470	100

1963 Springfield, Massachusetts mayoral election
Candidate	Primary election		General election	
Candidate	Votes	%	Votes	%
Charles Ryan (incumbent)	11,906	57	32,063	72.92
John P. Lynch	7,284		11,909	27.08
Arthur R. Caney				
Total		100	43,972	100

1968 United States House of Representatives Massachusetts's 2nd district Democratic primary
Party	Candidate	Votes	%
Democratic	Edward P. Boland (incumbent)	42,100	62.71
Democratic	Charles V. Ryan	25,038	37.29
Total votes		67,138	100

1995 Springfield, Massachusetts mayoral election
Candidate	Primary election		General election	
Candidate	Votes	%	Votes	%
Michael J. Albano	6,764	31.77	18,929	52.29
Charles V. Ryan	7,930	37.25	17,274	47.71
Robert Markel (incumbent)	4,160	19.54		
Frederick Hurst	1,740	8.17		
Chelan Jenkins	694	3.26		
Total	21,288	100	36,203	100

2003 Springfield, Massachusetts mayoral election
Candidate	Votes	%
Charles V. Ryan	14,979	52.81
Linda J. Melconian	13,258	46.75
Write-ins	125	0.44
Turnout	28,362	33.15%

2005 Springfield, Massachusetts mayoral election
Candidate	Votes	%
Charles V. Ryan (incumbent)	14,164	63.48
Thomas Ashe	8,038	36.02
Write-ins	112	0.50
Turnout	22,314	27.85%

2007 Springfield, Massachusetts mayoral election
Candidate	Votes	%
Domenic J. Sarno	11,096	52.54
Charles V. Ryan (incumbent)	9,964	47.18
Write-ins	61	0.29
Turnout	21,121	26.81%

Political offices
Preceded by Thomas J. O'Connor	Mayor of Springfield, Massachusetts; 1962-1968	Succeeded by Frank Harlan Freedman
Preceded by Michael Albano	Mayor of Springfield, Massachusetts; 2004-2008	Succeeded by Domenic Sarno
