= Orlando Ramos =

American politician

Member of the Massachusetts House of Representatives from the 9th Hampden district
- Incumbent
- Assumed office January 6, 2021
- Preceded by: Jose Tosado

Personal details
- Born: Springfield, Massachusetts, U.S.
- Party: Democratic
- Education: Springfield Technical Community College (AA); University of Massachusetts Amherst (BA); Westfield State University (MPA)

Orlando Ramos is an American politician serving as a member of the Massachusetts House of Representatives from the 9th Hampden district. Elected in November 2020, he assumed office on January 6, 2021.

== Early life and education ==
Ramos was born and raised in Springfield, Massachusetts. After graduating from Roger L Putnam Vocational-Technical High School, he earned an associate degree from Springfield Technical Community College, a Bachelor of Arts in public policy from the University of Massachusetts Amherst, and a Master of Public Administration from Westfield State University.

== Career ==
Ramos worked as an intern in the office of Governor Deval Patrick. He was later elected to the Springfield City Council, where he introduced legislation to improve infrastructure in the city. He was elected to the Massachusetts House of Representatives in November 2020 and assumed office on January 6, 2021.

== Personal life ==
Ramos is Puerto Rican.
