= Michael Albano =

American politician

Michael J. Albano
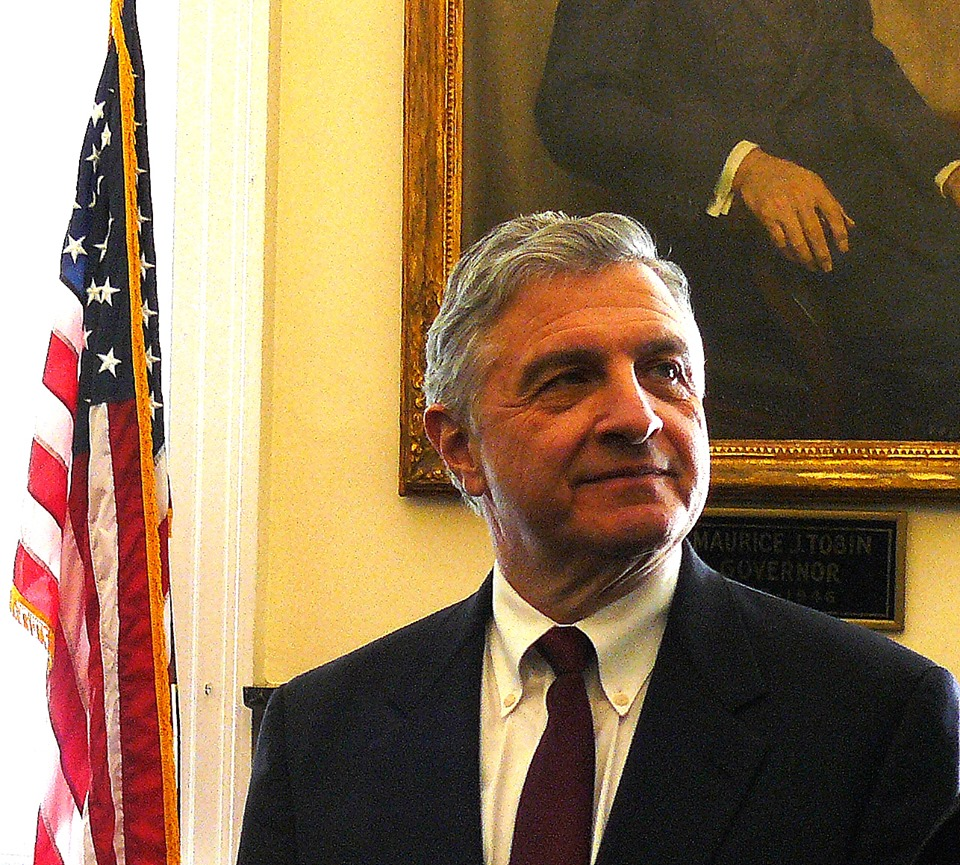
- Albano in 2012

Governor's Councilor from District 8 of Massachusetts
- In office January 4, 2013 – January 5, 2017
- Succeeded by: Mary Hurley

Mayor of Springfield, Massachusetts
- In office 1995–2003
- Preceded by: Robert Markel
- Succeeded by: Charles Ryan

Personal details
- Born: November 6, 1950 (age 75) Longmeadow, Massachusetts, U.S.
- Party: Democratic

Michael Albano (born November 6, 1950) is an American politician, college professor, and government affairs consultant who resides in Longmeadow, Massachusetts. He is the former mayor of Springfield, Massachusetts and the former Massachusetts Governor's Councilor representing western Massachusetts's 8th Council district. Albano began his public service career as a Probation Officer in the Westfield District Court in 1974. Subsequently, he was appointed to the Massachusetts State Parole Board in 1982 by Governor Edward J. King and reappointed by Governor Michael Dukakis in 1987. In 1992 Governor William Weld appointed Albano as a Special Parole Board Member. In 1994, State Auditor Joseph DeNucci appointed him as an Audit Specialist. Prior to his election to the Governor's Council, Albano's served on the Springfield School Committee from 1985–1989 (one 4-year term); the Springfield City Council 1991–1995 (two 2 year terms) 1995. Albano served as Council president in 1994 and 1995. In 1995, Albano was elected mayor of Springfield and went on to serve four two-year terms, leaving office in 2003.

On November 6, 2012, Albano was elected to the Governor's Council representing the counties of Hampden, Hampshire, Berkshire and Franklin of Massachusetts.

== Mayoralty ==
Albano defeated incumbent mayor Robert Markel in 1995's mayoral preliminary and faced off against Charles Ryan, who served as mayor in the 1960s. He defeated Ryan with 18929 votes to Ryan's 17274 votes. Much of the latter half of his time as mayor took place concurrently with a wide-ranging FBI mafia investigation that began targeting corruption in public officials in 2000, and which resulted in more than 30 convictions. These convictions included convictions of Albano's then chief of staff, Anthony M. Ardolino, and a political appointee and close friend, Gerald A. Phillips. Albano has claimed that the investigation was retaliation from the FBI stemming from his time on the Parole Board in the 1980s.

When Albano left office the Commonwealth of Massachusetts imposed a financial control board seven months later, removing local control of the budget.

== Political views ==
Michael Albano describes himself as a "Kennedy Liberal." Albano says he strongly supports the woman's right to choose an abortion, affirmative action, gay marriage, and labor unions. He opposes the death penalty. In his 2012 run for Governor's Council, Albano campaigned on the platform that there should be a "litmus test" for judges within Massachusetts on these issues.

== 2016 Candidacy for Sheriff ==
On January 29, 2016, Albano announced his candidacy for the Democratic Nomination for Sheriff of Hampden County. On September 8, 2016, Albano was defeated by Nick Cocchi for the Democratic nomination. Cocchi then went on become county sheriff.

Political offices
| Preceded by Robert Markel | Mayor of Springfield, Massachusetts; 1995–2003 | Succeeded by Charles Ryan |
