= Jack Keough =

American politician

John J. Keough Jr., (July 4, 1950 – February 2018), known as Jack or Righty, was an American politician.

Keough was born in Springfield, Massachusetts, on July 4, 1950, to parents John J. Keough Sr. and Marian Canavan. Keough Jr. attended Cathedral High School in his hometown, and subsequently graduated from Fairfield University. From 1979 until his death, Keough worked in insurance. He served on the Massachusetts House of Representatives as a Democrat in 1999 and 2000, after winning a special election to replace Dennis M. Murphy.

Keough died in February 2018, while vacationing in St. Petersburg, Florida.
