= Dennis M. Murphy =

American politician

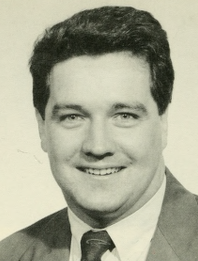

Dennis M. Murphy is an American former politician from Massachusetts.

Murphy worked for Athan Catjakis as a legislative aide. When Catjakis retired at the end of his fourth term in 1992, Murphy won the open seat. Murphy won four terms as well, serving in the Massachusetts House of Representatives until 1999, when Jack Keough won a special election to replace him.
