= Jose Tosado =

American politician

Member of the Massachusetts House of Representatives from the 9th Hampden district
- In office January 7, 2015 – January 6, 2021
- Preceded by: Sean Curran
- Succeeded by: Orlando Ramos

Personal details
- Born: December 18, 1953 (age 72)
- Party: Democratic
- Spouse: Irma Tosado (m. 1980)
- Children: 3
- Education: Westfield State College (BA); University of Connecticut (MSW)
- Website: Massachusetts legislature website

Military service
- Allegiance: United States
- Branch/service: United States Navy
- Years of service: 1972–1975

Jose F. Tosado is an American politician who served as a member of the Massachusetts House of Representatives from January 2015 to January 2021.

== Career ==
A resident of Springfield, Massachusetts he attended Carew Street School, Chestnut Junior High School and graduated from the High School of Commerce in 1972. After high school he joined the United States Navy where he served on active duty for three years. For over 25 years he was the Director of the Greater Springfield Area of the Massachusetts Department of Mental Health. He was elected as a Democrat to represent the 9th Hampden district. He is a member of the Massachusetts Black and Latino Legislative Caucus. Tosado is a former president of the Springfield City Council.

In October 2014, Tosado was endorsed by The Republican, which noted "As a native of Puerto Rico, Tosado understands the special concerns of Latinos and will bring that voice to Beacon Hill."

Tosado had previously been an unsuccessful candidate in the 2011 Springfield, Massachusetts mayoral election.

== See also ==
- 2019–2020 Massachusetts legislature
