= Linda Melconian =

American politician

Linda J. Melconian
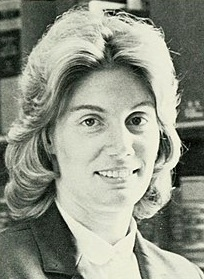
- Melconian c. 1991

Member of the Massachusetts Senate
- In office 1983–2005
- Preceded by: Alan Sisitsky
- Succeeded by: Stephen Buoniconti
- Constituency: 2nd Hampden and Hampshire (1983–1989); 1st Hampden (1989–1993); Hampden (1993–2005)

Personal details
- Born: Springfield, Massachusetts
- Party: Democratic
- Spouse: Andrew J. Scibelli
- Education: Mount Holyoke College; George Mason University; George Washington University
- Occupation: Attorney, educator, politician
- Known for: Massachusetts State Senator & First Woman Majority Leader of the Massachusetts Senate

Linda J. Melconian is a former American state legislator who served as the first woman Majority Leader in the history of the Massachusetts Senate. A member of the Democratic Party, she represented the greater Springfield area as its State Senator from 1983-2005. In 2017 Melconian was invited by the U. S. House of Representatives Historian’s Office to participate in an oral interview and transcript as part of the Oral History Project commemorating the 100th anniversary of the first woman elected to Congress.

== Early life and education ==
Melconian, the only child of George and Virginia Melconian, grew up in the Forest Park section of Springfield, Massachusetts. Melconian graduated with highest honors from Springfield's Classical High School and was a competitive swimmer in the backstroke events. A 1970 graduate of Mount Holyoke College, cum laude, Linda also earned a Master's Degree from the Elliott School of International Affairs at George Washington University, and a Doctor of Jurisprudence from George Mason University.

== Entry into politics ==
While in college, Melconian served as an intern for Congressman Edward P. Boland (D-MA). In 1971, she began her public service career as legislative assistant counsel to U. S. House of Representatives' Majority Thomas P. Tip O'Neill (D-MA). After "Tip" O'Neill was elected House Majority Leader and Speaker, Melconian became the first woman staff professional to merit standing U. S. House Floor privileges in all three majority leadership offices. She held staff positions including chief legislative assistant, speechwriter, House Floor scheduling and Member assistant, advisor on domestic and foreign policy and select/special committee assignments, and Assistant Counsel to the Speaker.

In 1974, Melconian assisted then Majority Leader Tip O'Neill in his efforts to assure the integrity of the U.S. House of Representatives during the constitutional crisis of the historic Richard Nixon impeachment hearings. Melconian had a role in assisting in the passage of House Resolution 148 which created April 24 as a national day of commemorating the Armenian Genocide as "Man's Inhumanity to Man".

== Massachusetts State Senate ==
For more than two decades, Melconian rose through the Democratic Party ranks to become Assistant Majority Leader and then Majority Floor Leader of the Massachusetts Senate where she often held the position of Acting Senate President. Appointed by the Senate President Thomas Birmingham (D-MA) and confirmed by the Senate Democratic Caucus as the first woman Majority Leader in the history of the Massachusetts Senate, Melconian managed to help shape the legislative agenda and led the Senate in all its deliberations and decision making on public policy issues.

In the State Senate Melconian also served as Senate Chairwoman of Insurance Committee where she was responsible for developing all major property/casualty, health and life insurance legislation in the Commonwealth and created a legislative Science and Technology Committee. Melconian held positions on the Senate Ways and Means (assistant vice chairwoman), Joint Committees on Judiciary, vice chairwoman Commerce and Labor, and Elderly and Human Service.

As Senator she authored numerous notable Massachusetts laws including the right of privacy and anti-discrimination in genetic testing, a comprehensive initiative. She created new laws that increased access to health care and insurance coverage for women and children generally, including insurance coverage for women in small businesses and third-party insurance benefits for women who practiced in traditionally female health care professions.

In 2003, she had run unsuccessfully for mayor of Springfield, winning 13,258 votes (46.75) to the 14,989 votes (52.81%) won by her opponent, former mayor Charles V. Ryan.

== Post public service ==
Currently, Melconian teaches at the Institute for Public Service and Business Law/Ethics Departments at Suffolk University's Business School. As Senior Fellow in the Moakley Center for Public Management, she works with business and government leaders. Through the Moakley Center, she developed a Moakley Fellows Internship Program and a Moakley Breakfast Series on current public policy issues at the federal, state and local levels. Linda presents locally, nationally, and internationally at forums, conferences, panels and summits on applied leadership and gender leadership in the political arena. She contributes to The Weissman Center for Leadership and the Liberal Arts at Mount Holyoke College, enhancing its program offerings on leadership for women. She was a past advisor and consultant to American International College Springfield, MA where she enriched its MPA program and developed its MSNPM program.

In 2012, Mount Holyoke College honored Melconian as one of its 175 alumnae "Women of Influence". and she was inducted into Suffolk University’s Chapter of Pi Alpha Alpha National Honor Society for Public Affairs and Public Administration for “Scholarship-Leadership-Excellence.” In 2018 she was honored with the Dean John Brennan Award for “Outstanding Instruction to Graduate Students” by Suffolk University Student Government Association. Melconian also serves on Greenfield Community College's Board of trustees and as a Hampden County Deputy Sheriff. In addition, she has published numerous articles.

== Published works ==
Linda has published material on political leadership including “Lead and Win: 78 keys and strategies,” and “Applied Leadership,” a book chapter. Her most recent published scholarly articles include: “Gender Pay Equality: Effectiveness of Federal Statutes and Recent U.S. Supreme Court Decisions,” “Health-care Nonprofits: Enhancing Governance and Public Trust,” "Evolving Corporate Governance Standards for HealthCare Nonprofits: Is Board Compensation a Breach of Fiduciary Duty?", “Enhancing Business Ethics and Governance Curriculum: Teaching Nonprofit Organizational Governance,” "State Oversight of Nonprofit Governance: Confronting the Challenge of Mission Adherence within a Multi-Dimensional Standard,” and "Social Enterprise: Reaffirming Public Purpose Governance Through Shared Value.”

== See also ==
- Massachusetts Senate's Hampden district
- Massachusetts Senate's 2nd Hampden and Hampshire district

Political offices
Preceded by Thomas C. Norton	Majority Leader of the Massachusetts Senate; 1999–2003	Succeeded by Frederick Berry
Preceded by Frederick Berry	Assistant Majority Floor Leader of the Massachusetts Senate; 1996–1999	Succeeded by Stan Rosenberg
