= John A. Denison =

American politician and judge

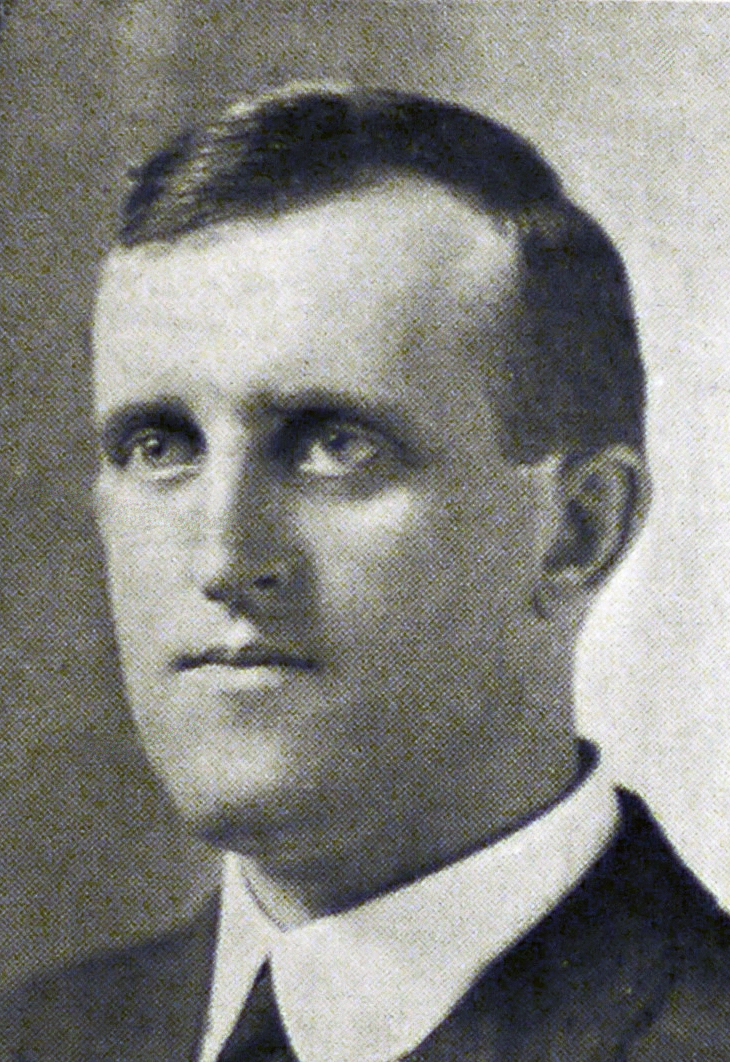
- Campaign portrait of John A. Denison, 1912

34th Mayor of the City of Springfield, Massachusetts
- In office 1913–1914
- Preceded by: Edward H. Lathrop
- Succeeded by: Frank E. Stacy

Personal details
- Born: August 17, 1875 Chicopee, Massachusetts
- Died: March 7, 1948 (aged 72) Longmeadow, Massachusetts
- Party: Republican

John Avery Denison (August 17, 1875 – March 7, 1948) was an American politician and judge. He was Mayor of Springfield, Massachusetts, and a judicial appointee of Calvin Coolidge.

== Early life and family ==
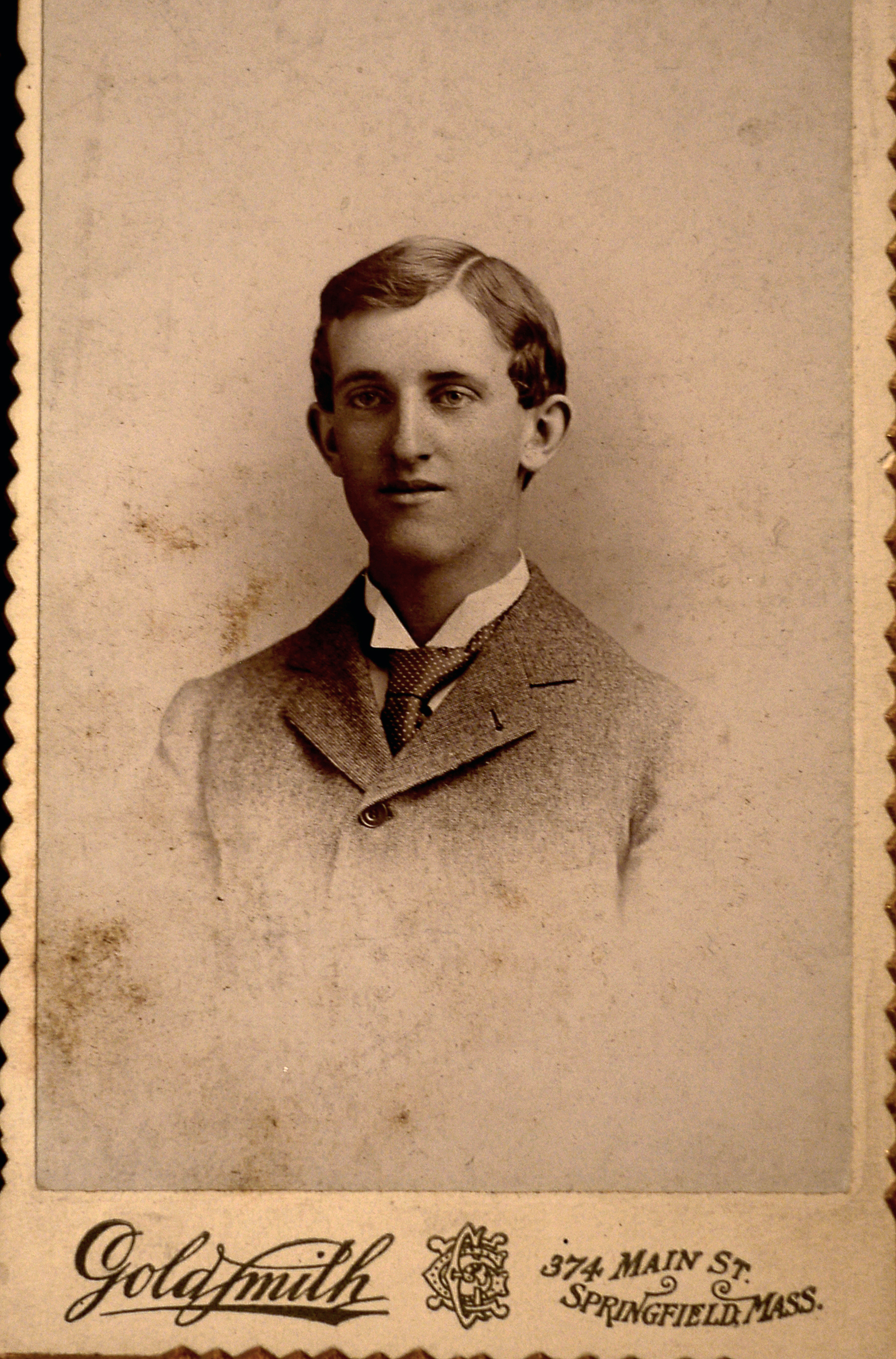
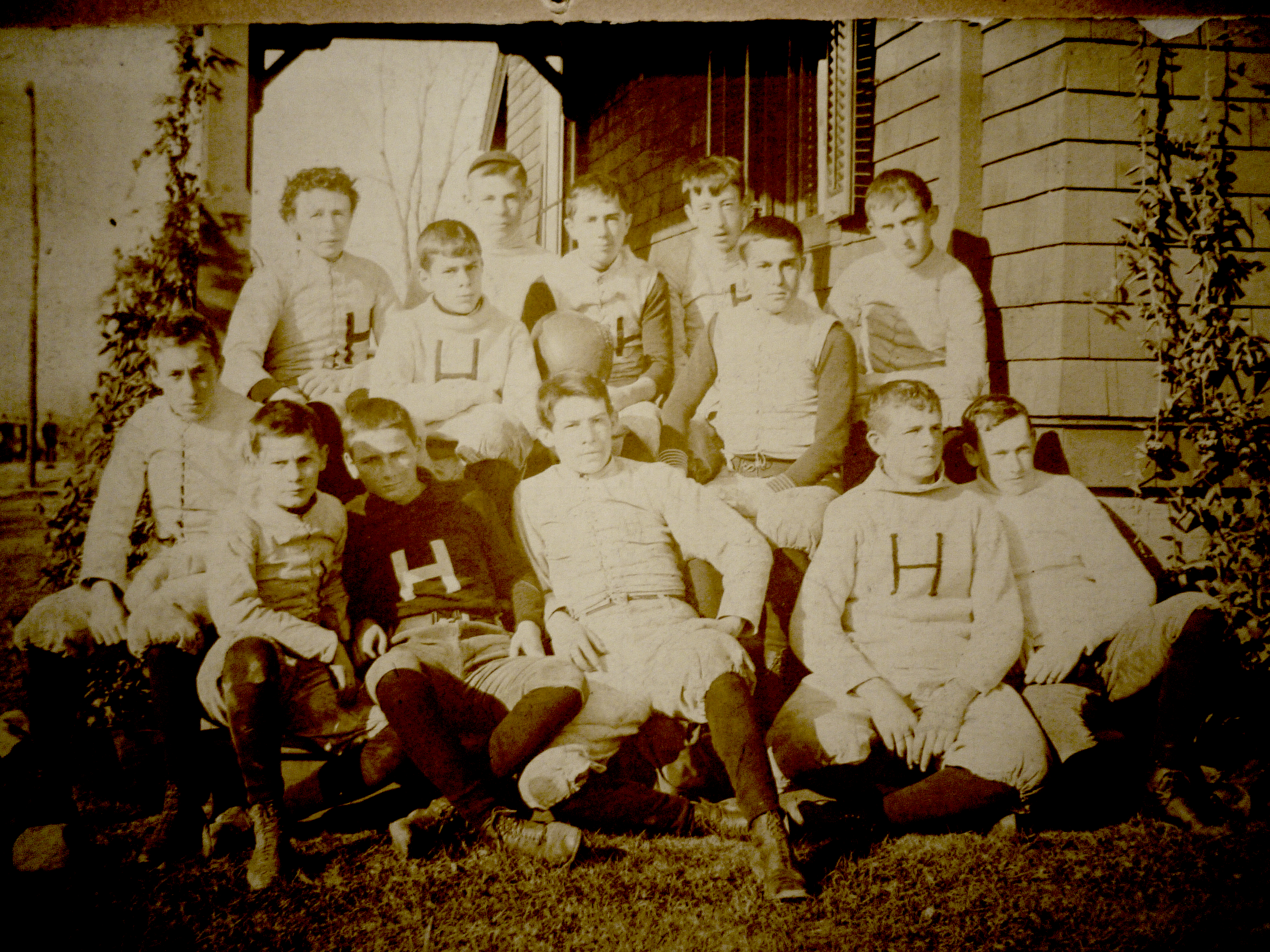
Portrait of a young Denison as a high school student, and as a member of the Harvard Football Team, c. 1897

Denison was born on August 17, 1875, in Chicopee, Massachusetts, near Springfield, Massachusetts. His father, George Denison, was the great-grandson of the founder of the Connecticut colony—Captain George Denison (b. Dec. 1620) of Mystic, Connecticut.

His mother, Elizabeth Chapin Denison, was the granddaughter of Samuel Chapin—a prominent early settler of Springfield, Massachusetts—whose statue stands in Springfield's Merrick Park. Through his mother, Denison was a close relative of United States Presidents Grover Cleveland and William Howard Taft, abolitionist and author Harriet Beecher Stowe, financier J.P. Morgan, and poet and playwright T.S. Eliot.

== Denison Homestead ==
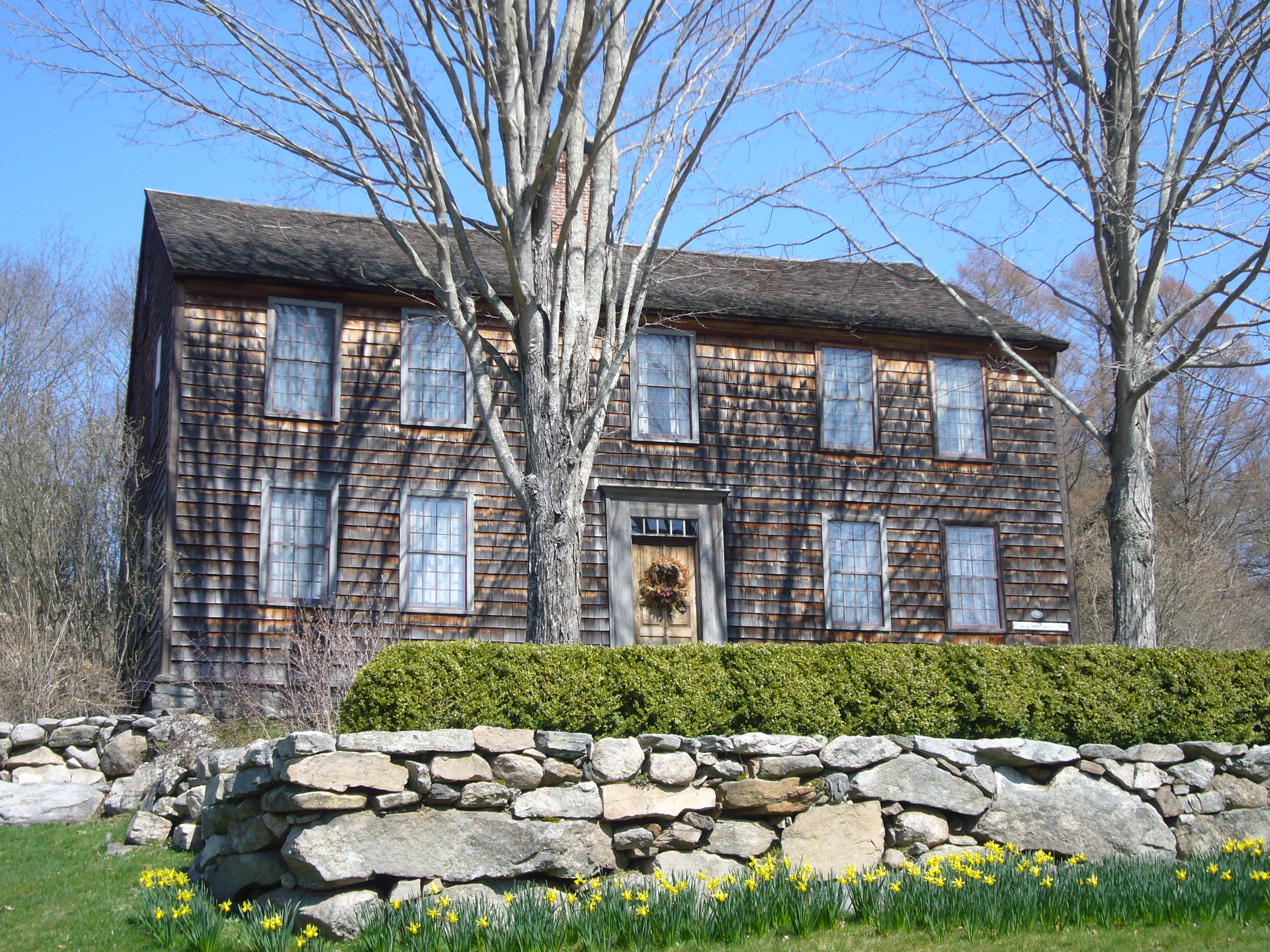
The Denison family home (Pequotsepos Manor) was constructed by George Denison in 1717 and is today one of the oldest continually held homes in America. It includes the Denison Homestead and Denison Pequotsepos Nature Center. The home was added to the National Register of Historic Places on June 15, 1979.

The Denison family's home (Pequotsepos Manor) was built in 1717 and has been continuously held by the same family since that date—one of the oldest homes to have been retained by the same family in the United States. Today, the Denison Homestead includes regional museum and the Denison Pequotsepos Nature Center—a 300-acre wildlife sanctuary, natural history museum, and educational facility in Mystic, Connecticut.

== Education ==
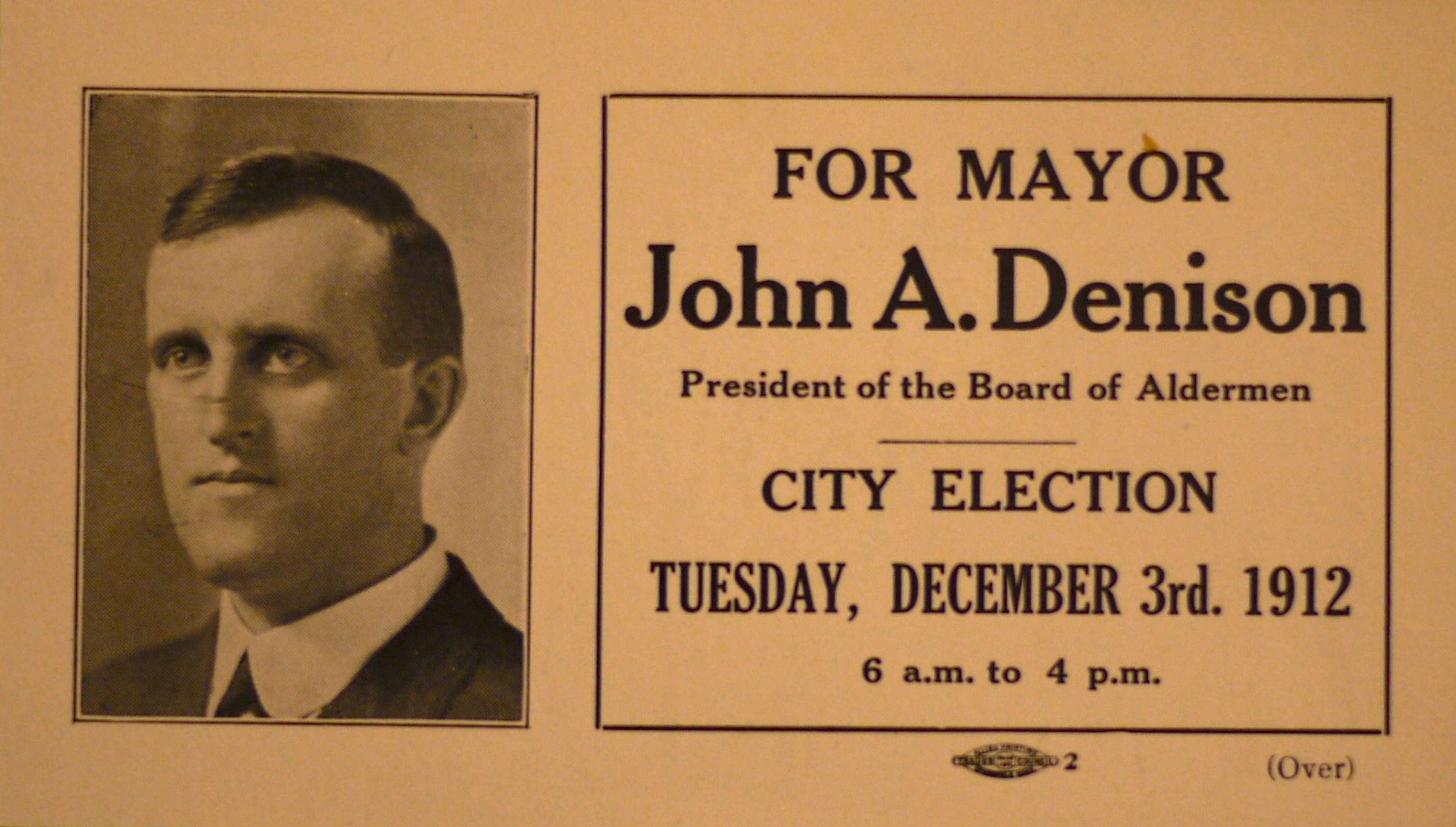
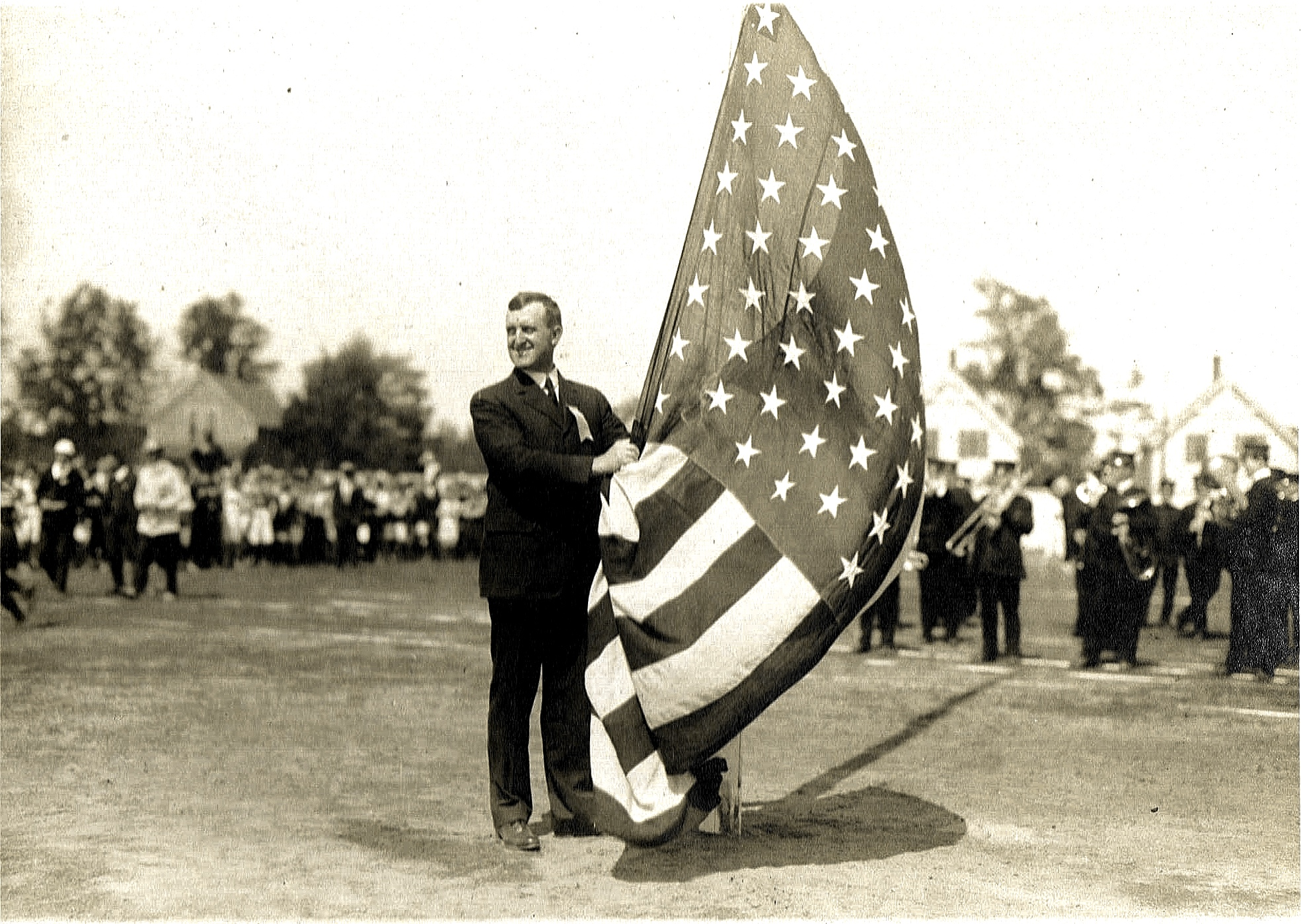
1912 Campaign flyer of Mayor John A. Denison; Mayor John A. Denison presiding over Independence Day celebrations on July 4, 1913 in Springfield, Massachusetts

Denison graduated with honors from Springfield High School. He then attended the University of Vermont. Later, like his father, attended Harvard University where he received his undergraduate degree in 1898 and his law degree in 1901. He was editor of the Harvard Crimson from 1896 to 1898.

== Mayor and judge ==
Denison was elected mayor in 1912 after serving as president of the city council.

As mayor, Denison oversaw construction and dedication of the Springfield Municipal Group, which includes City Hall, Bell Tower and Symphony Hall and which remain today as the seat of Springfield's government. On December 8, 1913, at the dedication of the three buildings, President Howard Taft, who was in attendance, referred to the three buildings Denison had spearheaded as "one of the most distinctive civic centers in the United States, and indeed the world." As mayor, Denison led efforts to develop Springfield's transportation system, including rebuilding and restoring the city's train station. In 1920, Calvin Coolidge appointed Denison to a judicial seat, where he served until his retirement. He died at his home in Longmeadow on March 7, 1948

== Record as mayor and judge ==
Denison was a progressive mayor and judge during a period of change in Massachusetts and an advocate for environmental conservation. His position set a tone of inclusivity in regional politics at the time.

At a 1912 campaign speech, Denison was quoted as saying:

"We have numerous classes of people. Each class has its special viewpoint and special need. All classes should have representation and a part in the city's government so that the needs of all can be best presented, appreciated, and met. Power should not be concentrated in the hands of a few, least of all if those few are drawn from the same walk of life."

Denison was also an advocate for public service. Denison's first acceptance speech as mayor in 1913 entitled "Endeavors in the Municipality" sought to reach all the City's residents noting "do your share in this city of ours and if you learn about and understand your government, if you give of yourselves freely to many kinds of public and quasi-public undertakings, you will find your return a hundredfold."

== 2013 centennial and return of city key ==
On October 4, 2013, Springfield mayor Domenic Sarno announced a centennial celebration of Mayor Denison's service and the Springfield Municipal Group. At the ceremony, Denison's great-grandson, Jonathan Fantini Porter, returned to Springfield the original key to City Hall which was given to Mayor Denison and President Howard Taft at the building's 1913 dedication.
