= List of mayors of Springfield, Massachusetts =

Mayor of Springfield
- Seal of Springfield

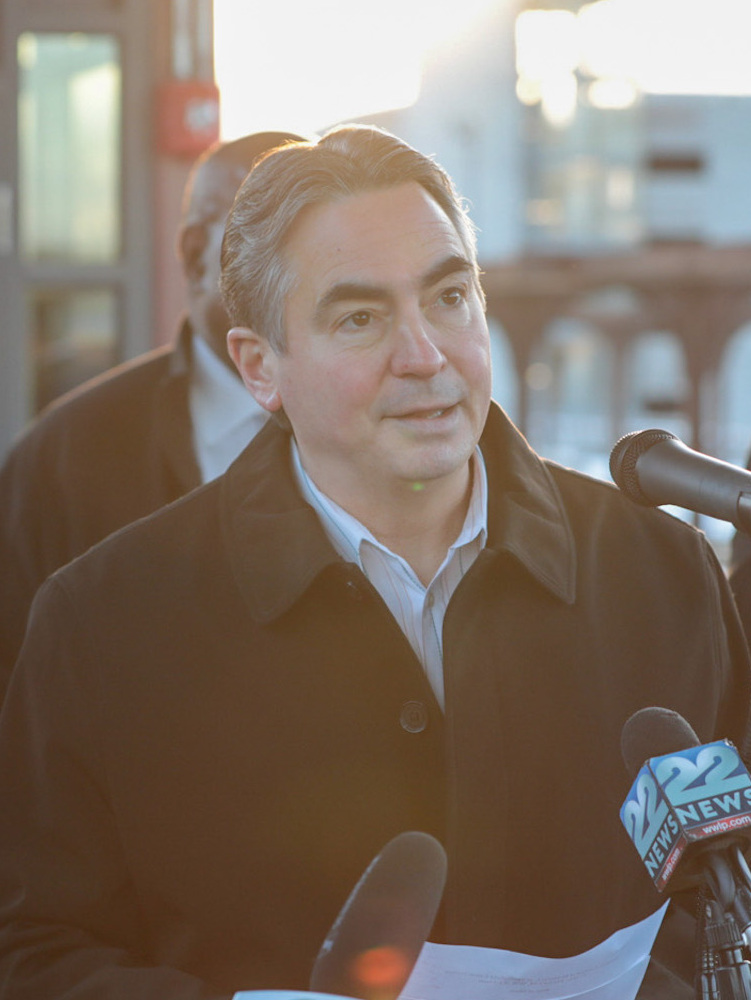
- Incumbent; Domenic J. Sarno since January 7, 2008
- Style: His/Her Honor
- Type: Chief executive
- Member of: School Committee
- Residence: None official
- Seat: Springfield City Hall
- Nominator: Non-partisan nominating petition
- Appointer: Popular vote
- Term length: Four years (2011-Present); Two years (1925-2011); One year (1852-1925)
- Constituting instrument: Springfield City Charter
- Precursor: Springfield Board of Selectmen (1636-1852)
- Formation: 1852
- First holder: Caleb Rice
- Salary: $175,000 (2024)
- Website: www.springfield-ma.gov/cos/mayor

The mayor of Springfield is the head of the municipal government in Springfield, Massachusetts. Springfield has a mayor-council government. Mayors of Springfield are appointed through direct, non-partisan elections to a four-year term; there are no term limits. The mayor's office oversees the enforcement of all laws and ordinances within the city, appoints and supervises a majority of appointed officials, and serves as an ex officio member of the Springfield School Committee. The mayor's office is located in Springfield City Hall, as part of the Municipal Group in Metro Center.

The current mayor of Springfield is Domenic Sarno.

== List of mayors ==
#	Picture	Mayor	Term		Party	Election
#	Picture	Mayor	Start	End	Party	Election
1	Portrait of Caleb Rice	Caleb Rice	May 25, 1852	January 10, 1854	Whig	May 1852 December 1852
2	Portrait of Philos B. Tyler	Philos B. Tyler	January 10, 1854	January 1, 1855	Democratic	1853–1854 (Note: Election required three ballots for any candidate to win a majority of votes between December 5, 1853 and January 9, 1854.)
3	Portrait of Eliphalet Trask	Eliphalet Trask	January 1, 1855	January 7, 1856	Know Nothing	1854
4	Portrait of Ansel Phelps, Jr.	Ansel Phelps, Jr.	January 7, 1856	January 3, 1859	Democratic	1855 1856 1857
5	Portrait of William Barron Calhoun	William Barron Calhoun	January 3, 1859	January 2, 1860	Whig	1858
6	Portrait of Daniel L. Harris	Daniel L. Harris	January 2, 1860	January 7, 1861	Republican	1859
7	Portrait of Stephen C. Bemis	Stephen C. Bemis	January 7, 1861	January 5, 1863	Democratic	1860 1861
8	Portrait of Henry Alexander Jr.	Henry Alexander, Jr.	January 5, 1863	January 2, 1865	Republican	1862 1863
9	Portrait of Albert D. Briggs	Albert D. Briggs	January 2, 1865	January 6, 1868	Republican (Anti-Refunder)	1864 1865 1866
10	Portrait of Charles A. Winchester	Charles A. Winchester	January 6, 1868	January 3, 1870	Republican	1867 1868
11	Portrait of William L. Smith	William L. Smith	January 3, 1870	January 1, 1872	Democratic	1869 1870
12	Portrait of Samuel B. Spooner	Samuel B. Spooner	January 1, 1872	January 5, 1874	Republican	1871 1872
13	Portrait of John M. Stebbins	John M. Stebbins	January 5, 1874	January 4, 1875	Democratic	1873
14	Portrait of Emerson Wight	Emerson Wight	January 4, 1875	January 6, 1879	Republican	1874 1875 1876 1877
15	Portrait of Lewis J. Powers	Lewis J. Powers	January 6, 1879	January 3, 1881	Democratic & Citizens Republican	1878 1879
16	Portrait of William H. Haile	William H. Haile	January 3, 1881	January 2, 1882	Republican	1880
17	Portrait of Edwin W. Ladd	Edwin W. Ladd	January 2, 1882	January 1, 1883	Democratic	1881
18	Photo of Henry M. Phillips in 1880	Henry M. Phillips	January 1, 1883	January 4, 1886	Republican	1882 1883 1884
19	Photo of Edwin D. Metcalf, 1890	Edwin D. Metcalf	January 4, 1886	January 3, 1887	Republican	1885
20	Portrait of Elisha B. Maynard	Elisha B. Maynard	January 3, 1887	January 7, 1889	Democratic	1886 1887
21	Portrait of Edward S. Bradford	Edward S. Bradford	January 7, 1889	January 4, 1892	Republican	1888 1889 1890
22	Photo of Lawson Sibley	Lawson Sibley	January 4, 1892	January 2, 1893	Democratic	1891
23	Photo of Edmund P. Kendrick	Edmund P. Kendrick	January 2, 1893	January 7, 1895	Republican	1892 1893
24	Photo of Charles L. Long	Charles L. Long	January 7, 1895	January 6, 1896	Republican	1894
25		Newrie D. Winter	January 6, 1896	January 4, 1897	Democratic	1895
26	Photo of Henry S. Dickinson	Henry S. Dickinson	January 4, 1897	January 2, 1899	Republican	1896 1897
27		Dwight O. Gilmore	January 2, 1899	January 1, 1900	Republican	1898
28	Photo of William P. Hayes	William P. Hayes	January 1, 1900	January 6, 1902	Democratic	1899 1900
29	Photo of Ralph W. Ellis	Ralph W. Ellis	January 6, 1902	January 5, 1903	Republican	1901
30		Everett E. Stone	January 5, 1903	January 2, 1905	Republican	1902 1903
31	Photo of Francke W. Dickinson	Francke W. Dickinson	January 2, 1905	January 7, 1907	Republican	1904 1905
32		William E. Sanderson	January 7, 1907	January 3, 1910	Republican	1906 1907 1908
33		Edward H. Lathrop	January 3, 1910	January 6, 1913	Democratic	1909 1910 1911
34	Portrait of John A. Denison	John A. Denison	January 6, 1913	January 4, 1915	Republican	1912 1913
35		Frank E. Stacy	January 4, 1915	January 6, 1919	Republican	1914 1915 1916 1917
36		Arthur A. Adams	January 6, 1919	January 3, 1921	Republican	1918 1919
37	Portrait of Edwin F. Leonard	Edwin F. Leonard	January 3, 1921	January 5, 1925	Republican	1920 1921 1922 1923
38	Portrait of Fordis C. Parker	Fordis C. Parker	January 5, 1925	January 6, 1930	Republican	1924 1925 1927
39		Dwight R. Winter	January 6, 1930	January 1, 1934	Democratic	1929 1931
40		Henry Martens	January 1, 1934	January 3, 1938	Republican	1933 1935
41		Roger L. Putnam	January 3, 1938	April 13, 1943	Democratic	1937 1939 1941
42		J. Albin Anderson, Jr.	April 13, 1943	January 7, 1946	Republican	Acting 1943
43		Daniel B. Brunton	January 7, 1946	January 6, 1958	Democratic	1945 1947 1949 1951 1953 1955
44	Portrait of Thomas J. O'Connor, 1953	Thomas J. O'Connor	January 6, 1958	January 1, 1962	Democratic	1957 1959
45		Charles V. Ryan	January 1, 1962	January 1, 1968	Democratic	1961 1963 1965
46	Portrait of Frank Harlan Freedman in 1972	Frank Harlan Freedman	January 1, 1968	October 17, 1972	Republican	1967 1969 1971
47		Theodore Dimauro	October 17, 1972	February 9, 1973	Democratic	Acting
48		William C. Sullivan	February 9, 1973	January 2, 1978	Democratic	January 1973 November 1973 1975
(47)		Theodore Dimauro	January 2, 1978	January 2, 1984	Democratic	1977 1979 1981
49	Photo of Richard Neal	Richard Neal	January 2, 1984	January 3, 1989	Democratic	1983 1985 1987
50		Vincent DiMonaco	January 3, 1989	May 5, 1989	Democratic	Acting
51		Mary Hurley	May 5, 1989	January 6, 1992	Democratic	April 1989 November 1989
52		Robert Markel	January 6, 1992	January 1, 1996	Democratic	1991 1993
53	Photo of Michael Albano	Michael Albano	January 1, 1996	January 5, 2004	Democratic	1995 1997 1999 2001
54		Charles V. Ryan	January 5, 2004	January 7, 2008	Democratic	2003 2005
55	photo of Domenic Sarno	Domenic J. Sarno	January 7, 2008	Incumbent	Democratic	2007 2009 2011 2015 2019 2023

== See also ==
- Mayoral elections in Springfield, Massachusetts
