= Edward S. Bradford =

American politician (1842-1914)

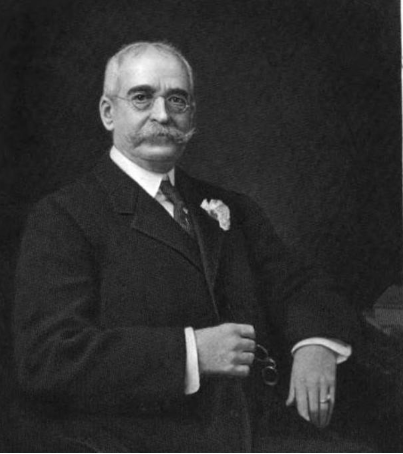

35th Massachusetts Treasurer
- In office 1900–1905
- Preceded by: Edward P. Shaw
- Succeeded by: Arthur Chapin

21st Mayor of Springfield, Massachusetts
- In office 1899–1901
- Preceded by: Elisha B. Maynard
- Succeeded by: Lawson Sibley

Member of the Springfield, Massachusetts Common Council Ward 5
- In office 1886–1888

Personal details
- Born: December 1, 1842 Pawtucket, Rhode Island
- Died: September 1, 1914 (aged 71)
- Party: Republican
- Spouse(s): Mary Slater, m. April 28, 1868
- Children: Edward Standish Bradford, Jr.
- Profession: Businessman, engaged in the manufacturer of woolen products

Edward Standish Bradford (December 1, 1842 - September 1, 1914) was an American wool manufacture and politician who served as a member of the Webster, Massachusetts Board of Selectmen, on the Common Council of the city of Springfield, Massachusetts, in both branches of the Massachusetts legislature, as the 21st Mayor of Springfield, Massachusetts and as the 35th Treasurer and Receiver-General of Massachusetts.

== Family life ==
Bradford married Mary (Slater) Standish, they had several children including a son Edward Standish Bradford, Jr.

== Bibliography ==
- City of Springfield, Municipal Register of the City of Springfield, Springfield, Massachusetts: City of Springfield, Massachusetts, pp 770–772, (1915).
- Eliot, Samuel Atkins, Editor Biographical History of Massachusetts: Biographies and Autobiographies of the Leading Men in the State, Volume 5,, non-pagenated, Boston, Massachusetts: Massachusetts Biographical Society (1914).
- "The Minute Man, Official Bulletin of the National Society of the Sons of the American Revolution Magazine, Volume XX, No. 2., New Members, page. 241, Washington, D.C. : National Society of the Sons of the American Revolution, (October 1925).

Political offices
Preceded by Edward P. Shaw	35th Treasurer and Receiver-General of Massachusetts; 1900–1905	Succeeded by Arthur Chapin
Preceded by Elisha B. Maynard	21st Mayor of Springfield, Massachusetts; 1889–1991	Succeeded by Lawson Sibley
