= Ajay Banga =

Indian-American business executive (born 1959)

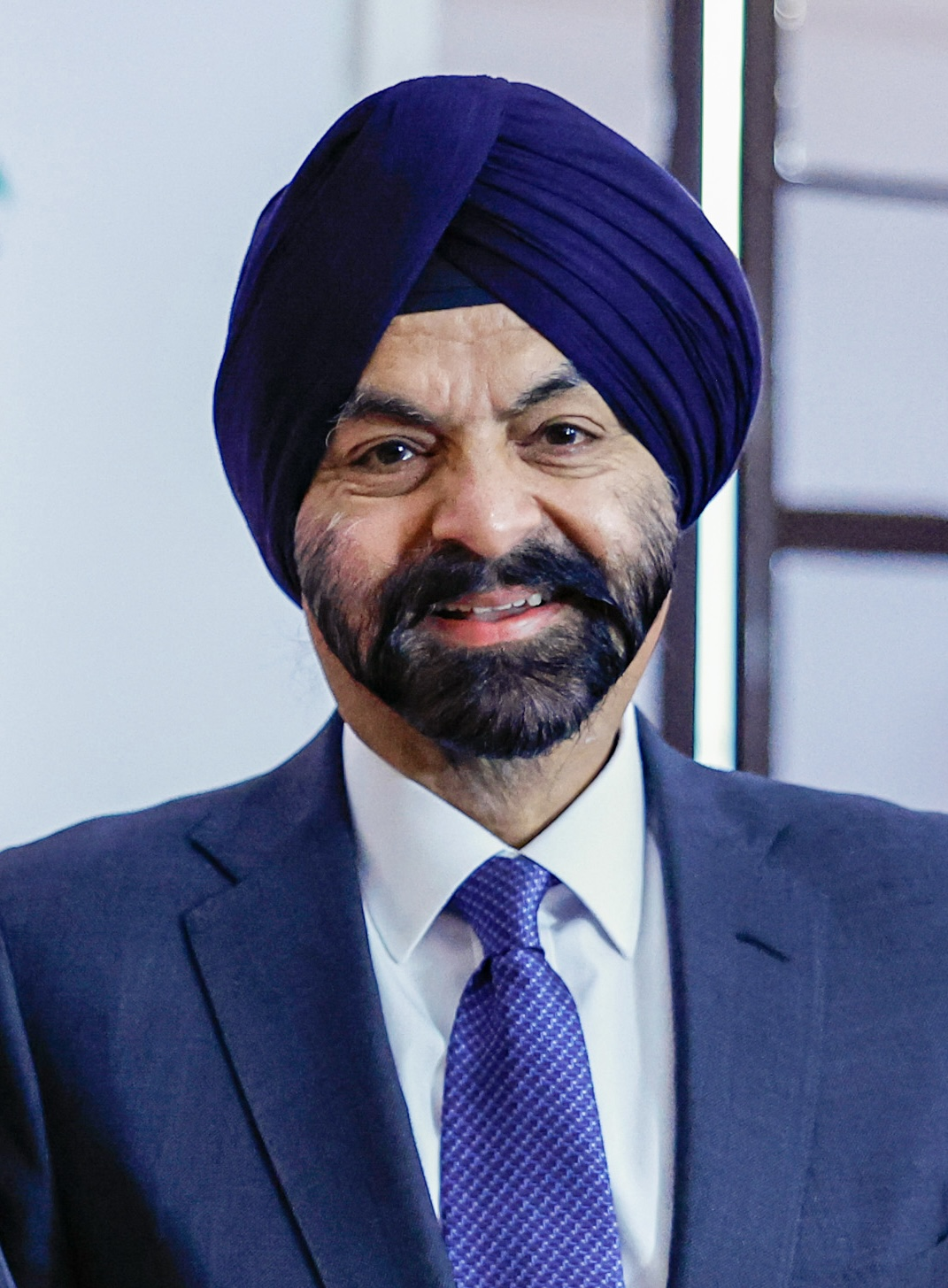
- Banga in 2024

President of the World Bank Group
- Incumbent
- Assumed office June 2, 2023
- Preceded by: David Malpass

Personal details
- Born: Ajaypal Singh Banga; November 10, 1959 (age 66) Poona, Bombay State, India
- Citizenship: India (1959–2007); United States (2007–present)
- Relatives: M. S. Banga (brother)
- Education: St. Stephen's College, Delhi (BA); Indian Institute of Management, Ahmedabad (MBA)
- Awards: Padma Shri (2016)

Ajaypal Singh "Ajay" Banga (born November 10, 1959) is an Indian-born American business executive, who is the president of the World Bank Group since 2023. He was the executive chairman of Mastercard, after having previously been president and chief executive officer (CEO) of the company from July 2010 until December 2020. He retired from this position in December 2021, and joined General Atlantic as its vice chairman.

Before being nominated to the World Bank, he was the chairman of Exor, the Agnelli-Elkann family holding company that controls its stakes in Stellantis and other industrial and financial businesses, and chairman of the public-private Partnership for Central America with U.S. vice president Kamala Harris.

Banga is the former chairman of the U.S.-India Business Council (USIBC) representing more than 300 of the largest international companies investing in India, and chairman of the International Chamber of Commerce.

Banga was elected President of the World Bank on 3 May 2023, having been nominated to the position in February 2023 by the Biden administration.

== Early life and education ==
Ajay Banga was born on November 10, 1959, into a Punjabi Sikh Saini family, in Khadki, Bombay State (now in Maharashtra), where his father, an army officer, was posted. His family is originally from Jalandhar, Punjab. His father, Harbhajan Singh Banga, was lieutenant-general in the Indian Army. He is the younger brother of businessman M. S. Banga.

Banga was educated at the St. Edward's School, in Shimla, Himachal Pradesh and at the Hyderabad Public School in Begumpet. He went on to graduate with a bachelor's degree in economics from the St. Stephen's College of the University of Delhi, subsequently earning his Post graduate program in management (equivalent to an MBA) from the Indian Institute of Management Ahmedabad in Gujarat.

== Business career ==
=== Early beginnings ===
Beginning his business career as a management trainee with Nestlé in 1981, Banga spent the next 13 years working in jobs spanning sales, marketing, and general management. He later joined PepsiCo and was involved in the launch of its international fast food franchises, including Pizza Hut and KFC, in India as the economy liberalized.

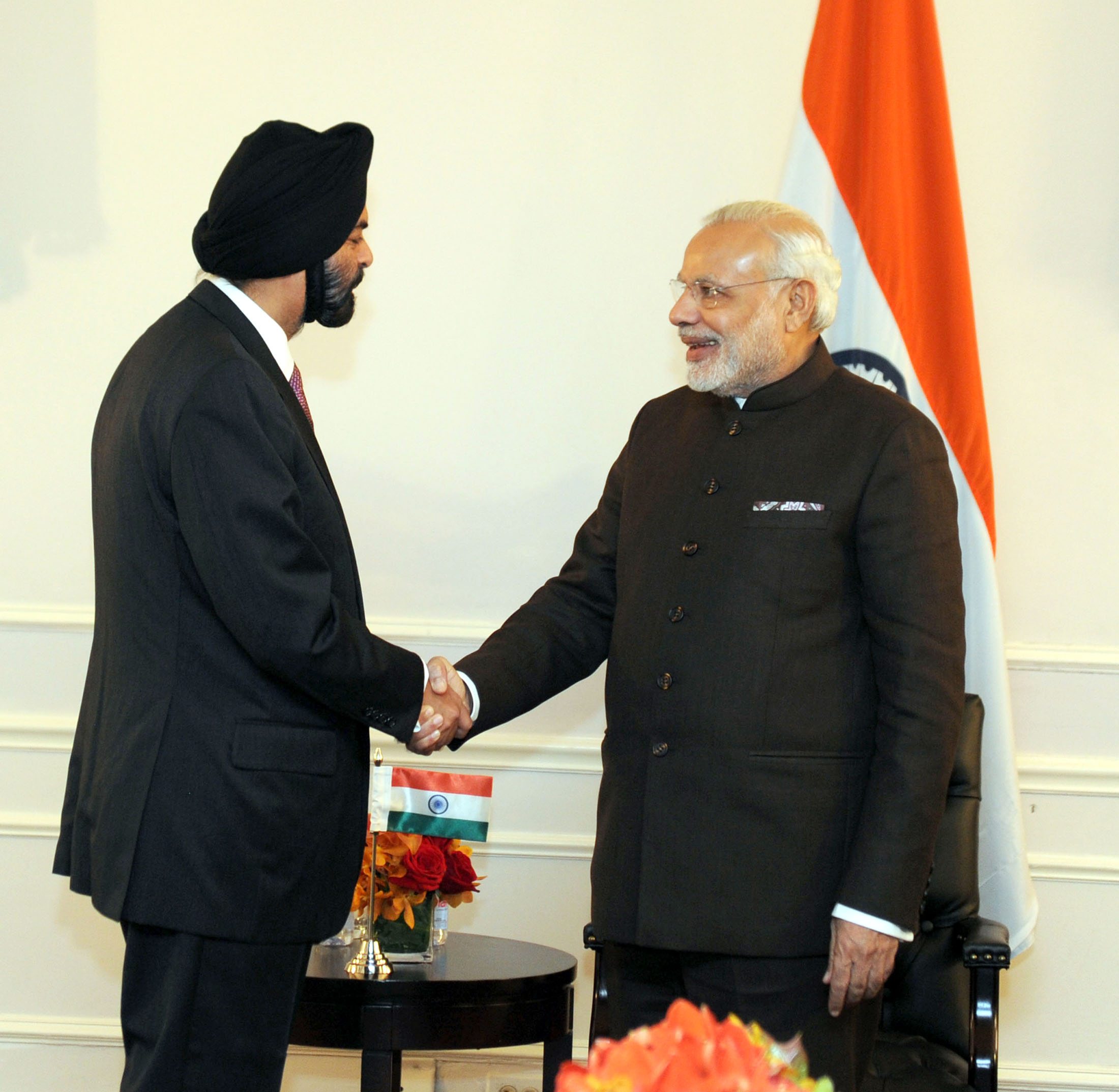
Banga with Prime Minister Narendra Modi

=== Citigroup, 1996–2009 ===
In 1996, Banga joined Citigroup, where he briefly worked as a debt collector as part of his training. He headed up CitiFinancial and the US Consumer Assets Division from 2000 to 2002 From 2005 to 2008 he was chief executive of Citi's International Global Consumer Group, which included all credit card and consumer banking operations outside of North America. During that time, he spearheaded Citi's strategy in the microfinance sector across the world.

In 2008, Banga became chief executive of the bank's Asia-Pacific business, and splitting time between New York and Hong Kong. In this capacity, he led a major reorganization of Citigroup's Asian operations in 2008 that gave regional heads increased authority across the bank's product lines. Banga received about $10 million in compensation in 2008 from Citigroup, making him one of the firm's highest paid executives that year.

=== Mastercard, 2010–2021 ===
Mastercard announced in April 2010 that Banga, previously its chief operating officer (COO), would become president and chief executive officer, effective July 1, 2010, and a member of the board of directors. Banga succeeded Robert W. Selander, who had been CEO since March 1997. In his first year, he received $13.5 million in compensation.

During his tenure, Banga tripled revenues, increased net income sixfold and grew market capitalization from under $30 billion to more than $360 billion. In 2020, he announced the creation of the Priceless Planet Coalition, a group of about 100 firms that make corporate investments to preserve the environment and launched Mastercard's pledge to plant 100 million trees.

=== Later career ===
In 2020, Banga was elected chairman of the International Chamber of Commerce (ICC), succeeding Paul Polman. He previously had been ICC's First Vice-chair since June 2018.

On January 1, 2022, Banga assumed responsibilities at General Atlantic as vice chairman.

On May 24, 2022, he was nominated non-executive chairman of Exor, the diversified holding company controlled by the Agnelli family, replacing John Elkann (who remained as CEO). Banga stepped down in May 2023, following his appointment to the World Bank.

== Career in the public sector ==
In February 2015, President Barack Obama appointed Banga as a member of the President's Advisory Committee for Trade Policy and Negotiations.

Following the 2020 elections, Banga was an outside adviser to then Vice President Kamala Harris as chairman of the Partnership for Central America, where he led a group of business leaders who advised her on the administration's work in El Salvador, Guatemala and Honduras.

On February 23, 2023, Banga was nominated by President Biden to lead the World Bank. On May 3, 2023, the World Bank confirmed Banga as its fourteenth president, and he started his term on June 2, 2023.

== Other activities ==
=== Corporate boards ===
- Exor, member of the Board of Directors (2021–2023) and chairman (2022–2023)
- Temasek Holdings, member of the Board of Directors (2021–2023)
- BeyondNetZero, member of the advisory board (since 2021)
- Dow Chemical Company, member of the Board of Directors (2013–2021)

=== Non-profit organizations ===
- Partnership for Central America (PCA), chair (since 2022)
- International Chamber of Commerce (ICC), chair (since 2020)
- American Red Cross (ARC), member of the Board of Governors (since 2014)
- Economic Club of New York, vice chair of the Board
- Peterson Institute for International Economics, member of the Board of Directors
- Trilateral Commission, member
- American India Foundation, co-chair of the Board of Directors (2016–2019)
- New York Hall of Science, vice chair of the Board of Trustee
- National Urban League, member of the Board
- Member of the Board of Trustees of the World Economic Forum.

== Personal life ==
Banga became a naturalized U.S. citizen in 2007. Banga has two daughters and three grandchildren.

== See also ==
- Indians in the New York City metropolitan area
- Gita Gopinath

Diplomatic posts
Preceded by David Malpass	President of the World Bank Group; 2023–present	Incumbent
