= Arthur Chapin =

American politician (1868-1943)

Arthur Beebe Chapin
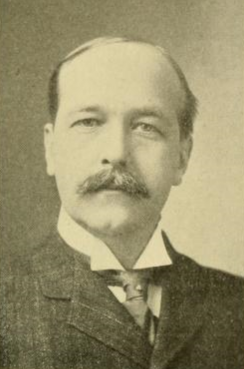

36th Treasurer and Receiver-General of Massachusetts
- In office 1905 – April 1, 1909
- Governor: William L. Douglas; Curtis Guild Jr.
- Preceded by: Edward S. Bradford
- Succeeded by: Elmer A. Stevens

19th Mayor of Holyoke, Massachusetts
- In office 1899–1904
- Preceded by: Michael Connors
- Succeeded by: Nathan P. Avery

Personal details
- Born: November 17, 1868 Chicopee, Massachusetts, U.S.
- Died: March 20, 1943 (aged 74) Holyoke, Massachusetts, U.S.
- Party: Republican
- Education: Amherst College
- Profession: Bank director Writer; Lawyer; Politician

Arthur Beebe Chapin (November 17, 1868 – March 20, 1943) was an American politician who served as the Treasurer and Receiver-General of Massachusetts from 1905 to 1909.

Chapin was born on November 17, 1868, in Chicopee, Massachusetts. He attended Phillips Andover Academy and graduated from Amherst College in 1891. He spent two years as a writer for The Youth's Companion. He was admitted to the Hampden County bar in 1895 after studying law under his father, Judge Henry Chapin.

Chapin was hired as the Solicitor of Holyoke, Massachusetts, in 1896 and two years later he was elected Mayor of the city. He was elected Treasurer and Receiver-General of Massachusetts in 1904, an office he held until April 1, 1909, when he resigned to become State Bank Commissioner. He resigned as bank commissioner on January 15, 1912, in order to become a vice-president of the American Trust Company.

Chapin died on March 20, 1943, in Holyoke, Massachusetts.

Political offices
Preceded by Edward S. Bradford	36th Treasurer and Receiver-General of Massachusetts; 1905 – April 1, 1909	Succeeded by Elmer A. Stevens
Preceded by Michael Connors	Mayor of Holyoke, Massachusetts; 1899–1904	Succeeded by Nathan P. Avery
