= Charles L. Long =

American politician

Charles Leonard Long
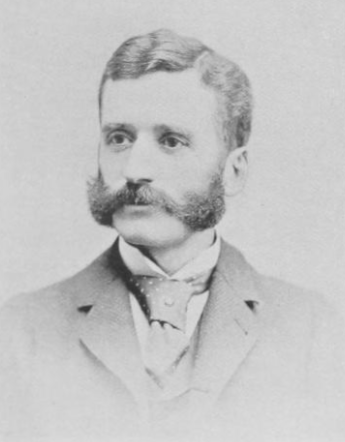

24th Mayor of Springfield, Massachusetts
- In office 1895–1895
- Preceded by: Edmund P. Kendrick
- Succeeded by: Newrie D. Winter

President of the Springfield, Massachusetts Common Council
- In office 1885–1886
- Preceded by: Edward C. Rogers
- Succeeded by: Henry H. Bowman

Member of the Springfield, Massachusetts Common Council Ward Four
- In office 1884–1886

Personal details
- Born: September 16, 1851 Lowell, Massachusetts
- Died: April 29, 1930 (aged 78) Springfield, Massachusetts
- Party: Republican
- Education: Harvard Law School, LL.B 1871
- Profession: Lawyer

Charles Leonard Long (1851-1930) was a Massachusetts lawyer, judge and politician who served as the Mayor of Springfield, Massachusetts in 1895.

== Biography ==
Long was born in Lowell, Massachusetts on September 16, 1851.

He died at his home in Springfield on April 29, 1930.

== Notes ==
Political offices
Preceded by Edmund P. Kendrick	24th Mayor of Springfield, Massachusetts; 1895 – 1895	Succeeded by Newrie D. Winter
Preceded by Edward C. Rogers	President of the Springfield, Massachusetts Common Council; 1885 – 1886	Succeeded by Henry H. Bowman
