= William P. Hayes =

American politician (1866–1940)

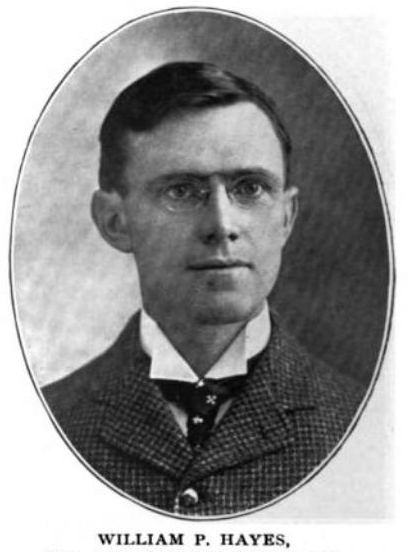

27th Mayor of Springfield, Massachusetts
- In office 1900–1901
- Preceded by: Dwight O. Gilmore
- Succeeded by: Ralph W. Ellis

Member of the Massachusetts Senate First Hampden District
- In office 1907–1907
- Preceded by: Fordis C. Parker
- Succeeded by: Francke W. Dickinson

Member of the Springfield, Massachusetts Common Council
- In office 1892–1893

Personal details
- Born: March 27, 1866 Springfield, Massachusetts
- Died: October 20, 1940 (aged 74) Massachusetts, U.S.
- Party: Democratic
- Education: Boston University School of Law, 1889
- Profession: Attorney

William P. Hayes (March 27, 1866 – October 20, 1940) was an American lawyer and politician who served as the twenty seventh Mayor of Springfield, Massachusetts.

== Early life ==
Hayes was born in Springfield, Massachusetts, on March 27, 1866, to John and Margaret Hayes.

== Education ==
Hays was educated at the Springfield grammar and High Schools. Hayes attended Ottawa College in Ottawa, Ontario, where he spent one year, and Boston University School of Law, from which he graduated in 1889.

== Early career ==
Hayes was the Assistant City Assessor of Springfield in 1887 and 1888. Hayes was admitted to the Massachusetts Bar at Springfield, Massachusetts, on November 12, 1889.

He was also the first Irish mayor of Springfield, Massachusetts.

Political offices
Preceded by Dwight O. Gilmore	27th Mayor of Springfield, Massachusetts; 1900–1901	Succeeded by Ralph W. Ellis
Preceded by Fordis C. Parker	Member of the Massachusetts Senate; First Hampden District; 1907–1907	Succeeded by Francke W. Dickinson

== See also ==
- 128th Massachusetts General Court (1907)
