= Dwight R. Winter =

American politician

39th Mayor of Springfield, Massachusetts
- In office 1930–1933
- Preceded by: Fordis C. Parker
- Succeeded by: Henry Martens

Personal details
- Born: November 22, 1887; Springfield, Massachusetts
- Died: February 23, 1943; Saranac Lake, New York, U.S.
- Political party: Democratic

Dwight R. Winter (November 22, 1887 – February 23, 1943) was an American politician and the 39th Mayor of Springfield, Massachusetts, and was the son of Springfield's 25th mayor, Newrie D. Winter. Winter ran on the Democratic ticket against Republican candidate Carlos B. Ellis. The 1929 campaign was his second; he had unsuccessfully run against incumbent mayor Fordis C. Parker in 1927. He won the election with 17,456 votes, compared to 15,350 for Ellis.

Because the country was at the start of the Great Depression, Winter's platform was very generic: he made no specific promises except to try and increase business in the city. Mr. Winter was tepidly endorsed by the Springfield Republican, which noted that the city would not be thrown backwards with the election of either candidate. Their endorsement focused on the fact that Mr. Winter was a Democrat, and the city had not had a Democratic mayor in 15 years. The Springfield Republican's post-election analysis surmised that Mr. Winter won because of his youth – Mr. Ellis was nearing the age of 70.

Winter handily won re-election in 1931, defeating state senator Chester W. Allen by a count of 22,798 votes to 11,992, riding a national Democratic wave.

In 1933, Mayor Winter failed to gain the nomination of the Democratic Party, losing to School Committeeman Theodore V. Quinlivan in the Democratic primary.
