= Caleb Rice =

American politician

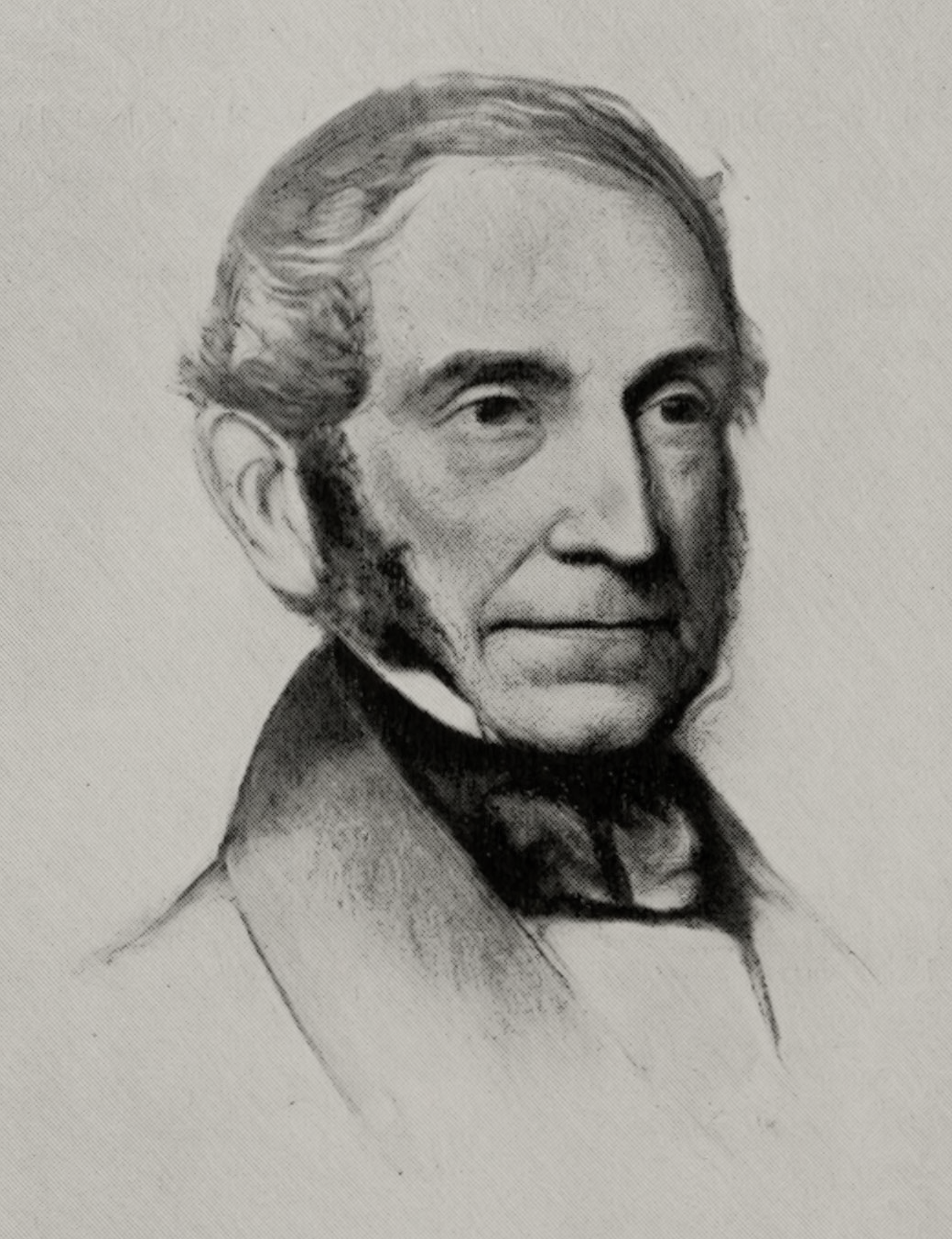

1st Mayor of Springfield, Massachusetts
- In office 1852–1853
- Preceded by: Board of Selectmen
- Succeeded by: Philos B. Tyler

3rd Sheriff of Hampden County, Massachusetts
- In office 1831–1851
- Preceded by: John Phelps
- Succeeded by: Patrick Boies

Member of the Board of Selectmen of West Springfield, Massachusetts
- In office 1826–1830

1st President of the Massachusetts Mutual Life Insurance Company
- In office June 1851 – March 1, 1873
- Preceded by: None
- Succeeded by: E. W. Bond

Personal details
- Born: April 4, 1792 Conway, Massachusetts
- Died: March 1, 1873 (aged 80)
- Spouse: Marietta Parsons Rice (m. 1826)
- Children: Joseph Rice (1828–1831); Benjamin Stebbins Rice (1829–1831); Elizabeth D. Rice (b. 1835)
- Education: Williams College
- Profession: Attorney, businessman

Caleb Rice (1792–1873) was an American politician and businessman. He was the first Mayor of Springfield, Massachusetts, when it became a city in 1852, and the first president of MassMutual Life Insurance Company, now a Fortune 100 company.

== Early years ==
Caleb Rice was born on April 4, 1792, in Conway, Massachusetts. He was the son of Joseph Rice and Betty (Dickerson) Rice. Rice married Marietta P. Parsons, daughter of Israel Parsons, in 1826.

== Career ==
Rice served as the first Mayor of Springfield, Massachusetts, when it became a city in 1852, and he was also the first president of MassMutual Life Insurance Company. Rice also served as the third Sheriff of Hampden County, Massachusetts, and on the Board of Selectmen of West Springfield, Massachusetts, Additionally, Rice served for five years in the Massachusetts House of Representatives from Springfield. He died March 1, 1873.

== Genealogy and family relations ==
Rice was a direct descendant of Edmund Rice an early immigrant to Massachusetts Bay Colony as follows:

- Caleb Rice, son of
  - Joseph Rice (1768-1823), son of
    - Israel Rice (1742-1833), son of
      - Joseph Rice (1712-1789), son of
        - Phineas Rice (1682-1768), son of
          - Joseph Rice (1638-1711), son of
            - Edmund Rice (circa 1594–1663)

Political offices
Preceded by Board of Selectmen	1st Mayor of Springfield, Massachusetts; 1852–1853	Succeeded by Philos B. Tyler
Preceded by John Phelps	3rd Sheriff of Hampden County, Massachusetts; 1831–1851	Succeeded by Patrick Boies
Business positions
Preceded by None	1st President of the Massachusetts Mutual Life Insurance Company; June 1851 – March 1, 1873	Succeeded by
Preceded by	President of the Springfield Aqueduct Company; 1864	Succeeded by
