= Ralph W. Ellis =

American politician

Ralph Waterbury Ellis
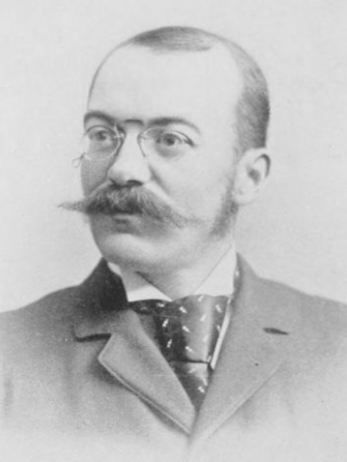

29th Mayor of Springfield, Massachusetts
- In office 1902–1902
- Preceded by: William P. Hayes
- Succeeded by: Everett E. Stone

Member of the Board of Aldermen of Springfield, Massachusetts Ward Four
- In office 1897–1898
- Preceded by: Henry S. Dickinson
- Succeeded by: Edwin A. Blodgett

Member of the Common Council of Springfield, Massachusetts Ward Four
- In office 1896–1896

Member of the Massachusetts House of Representatives
- In office 1893–1893

Personal details
- Born: November 25, 1856 South Hadley Falls, Massachusetts
- Died: September 28, 1945 (aged 88) Springfield, Massachusetts
- Party: Republican
- Spouse(s): Katherine Alice Rice, m. April 13, 1882
- Children: Theodore W. Ellis; Ralph W. Ellis
- Education: Harvard, 1879; Harvard Law School
- Profession: Attorney, banker

Ralph Waterbury Ellis (November 25, 1856 – September 28, 1945) was an American lawyer, banker and politician who served in the Massachusetts House of Representatives, as a member of the Springfield, Massachusetts Board of Aldermen and Common Council, and as the Mayor of Springfield in 1902.

== Biography ==
Ralph W. Ellis was born to Theodore Waterbury and Maria Louise (Van Boskerck) in South Hadley Falls, Massachusetts, November 25, 1856.

He graduated from Harvard University cum laude in 1879, and from Harvard Law School in 1881.

He died at his home in Springfield on September 28, 1945.

Political offices
Preceded by William P. Hayes	Mayor of Springfield, Massachusetts; 1902 – 1902	Succeeded by Everett E. Stone
