= Weber Shandwick =

American marketing communications firm

- Type: Subsidiary
- Industry: Marketing communications
- Predecessor: Weber Group; Shandwick International; BSMG
- Founded: January 2001; 25 years ago
- Headquarters: 909 Third Avenue, New York City 10022
- Number of locations: 65 offices
- Area served: Worldwide
- Key people: Susan Howe (CEO); Jim O'Leary (North America CEO and Global President); Karen Pugliese (Global President)
- Revenue: $831 million (2020)
- Number of employees: 4,670 (2020)
- Parent: Interpublic Group
- Website: www.webershandwick.com

Weber Shandwick is a global public relations and marketing communications firm headquartered in New York City. Formed in 2001 through the merger of the Weber Group, Shandwick International, and BSMG.The company is part of global agency network Interpublic Group (IPG), as part of the parent company's IPG DXTRA operating division. As of 2022, the firm maintained offices in more than 60 cities and has been recognized for its work in areas including crisis communications, content marketing, and employee engagement.

== History ==
Shandwick International, founded in 1974, was acquired by IPG in 1998. In September 2000, IPG announced it was merging Shandwick with IPG's Weber Group, itself founded in 1974, to form Weber Shandwick. The merger was completed on 1 January 2001, and in October, BSMG (formerly Bozell Sawyer Miller Group), which had been acquired by IPG as part of IPG's March 2001 acquisition of True North, merged with Weber Shandwick. BSMG Chairman Jack Leslie was named chairman of the new combined group, and CEO Harris Diamond became the group's CEO.

In 2010, Weber Shandwick's internal developers and social media teams created a social media crisis simulator called Firebell. In May, the agency was appointed global agency of record for the Tokyo 2020 Olympics.

In January 2012, after a Weber Shandwick executive moved to Hill & Knowlton, Weber Shandwick secured a restraining order after alleging the firm was taking their employees and clients. In May, the agency was appointed global agency of record for the Tokyo 2020 Olympics. In November 2012, Andy Polansky was named CEO.

In March 2013, Weber Shandwick launched MediaCo, a content marketing unit providing services to clients including native advertising and digital media buying.

In May 2014, the firm acquired a Sweden-based agency, Prime, and its business intelligence division, United Minds.

In October 2018, Weber Shandwick relaunched United Minds as a global management consultancy, combining the agency's global Employee Engagement & Change Management practice with United Minds Sweden, the management consultancy within Prime Weber Shandwick.

In July 2019, Gail Heimann was named president and CEO of Weber Shandwick, with Andy Polansky became the firm's Executive Chairman.

In May 2021, the United Minds consultancy and fellow IPG company KRC Research launched new diversity, equity, and inclusion (DE&I) research. United Minds also started a DE&I initiative called Code+ify, to help business leaders looking to improve their DE&I efforts. In June, Susan Howe was named president. In September, the firm partnered with AI-driven threat intelligence and detection platform Blackbird.AI to launch its Media Security Center, to help clients proactively identify and fight disinformation. In October, the firm announced that Chairman Jack Leslie was stepping down as chairman in March 2022.

In January 2022, it was announced that Andy Polansky, Weber Shandwick executive chairman and Interpublic Group Dxtra CEO, would retire in June 2022.

In 2023, Weber inaugurated its Women's Health Center of Excellence, an approach to help organizations research and educate the public about women's health issues. The company originally launched its offering in EMEA and eventually expanded it into North America, Latin America, and APAC. Weber worked with Kellanova to develop a humanoid Pop-Tart mascot for the first Pop-Tarts Bowl. The campaign won the Grand Prix in Brand Experience and Activation at the 2024 Cannes Festival of Creativity.

In March 2025, Weber launched Weber I/O, a service that combines analytics, data science, and experiential technology to help clients integrate AI and related technologies into their marketing and communications work. In April 2025, the company launched its Weber Advisory service, which counsels chief corporate affairs officers on reputation management, crisis communications, and public affairs strategies. In June 2025, Mars announced that it was putting Weber in charge of its earned media efforts.

In July 2026, Weber Shandwick announced senior leadership changes ahead of Karen Pugliese becoming CEO in September. The company appointed Michael Wehman as U.S. president, Joy Farber Kolo as chief innovation and integration officer, and expanded Mike Rosich's role to include president of Weber Shandwick New York.

== Operations ==
Weber Shandwick is based in New York City, and as of January 2022, listed offices in 67 cities worldwide, as well as other affiliate city offices in six continents. As of December 2021, Andy Polansky was Weber Shandwick's executive chairman, Jack Leslie was chairman, Gail Heimann served as the agency's CEO, and Susan Howe was the agency's president. The firm's network has expanded to a presence across 129 locations globally.

The agency and the eight sub-brands Cappuccino, Flipside, KRC Research, Powell Tate, Prime, Resolute, Revive Health, That Lot, and United Minds make up the Weber Shandwick Collective, within Interpublic Group's IPG DXTRA division, formerly known as IPG's Constituency Management Group.

The agency also does work as 3PM, a dedicated holding company group formed with fellow IPG company PMK-BNC to coordinate efforts for multinational brewing company InBev, primarily with the beer brands Bud and Bud Light.

In April 2026, journalist Venla Rossi wrote in a publication of the Finnish Journalists' Association that Weber Shandwick's Finnish representative Ahjo Communications had offered her a pre-written newspaper story, which had been produced together with the pharmaceutical company Boehringer Ingelheim, so that Rossi could offer the article to newspapers as her own.

== Research ==
Weber Shandwick conducts surveys and publishes research reports on business and social trends. Topics have included consumer activism, leadership, and corporate risk. Notable studies include:

- A February 2018 report identifying the growing trend of "buycotts", a form of consumer activism whereby consumers buy from good companies to show support.
- A November 2018 study of CEO activism along with involvement in politics, and its influence on government action.
- A 2019 study of company chief diversity officers identifying the challenges and benefits of pursuing DE&I initiatives.
- December 2020 employee activism research performed in conjunction with Weber Shandwick's United Minds consultancy.
- May 2021 DE&I research done by the United Minds consultancy and fellow IPG company KRC Research.
- An August 2021 report on geopolitics and major implications for corporate risk. (Fortune)
