= Jack Leslie (public relations executive) =

American public relations executive & political consultant

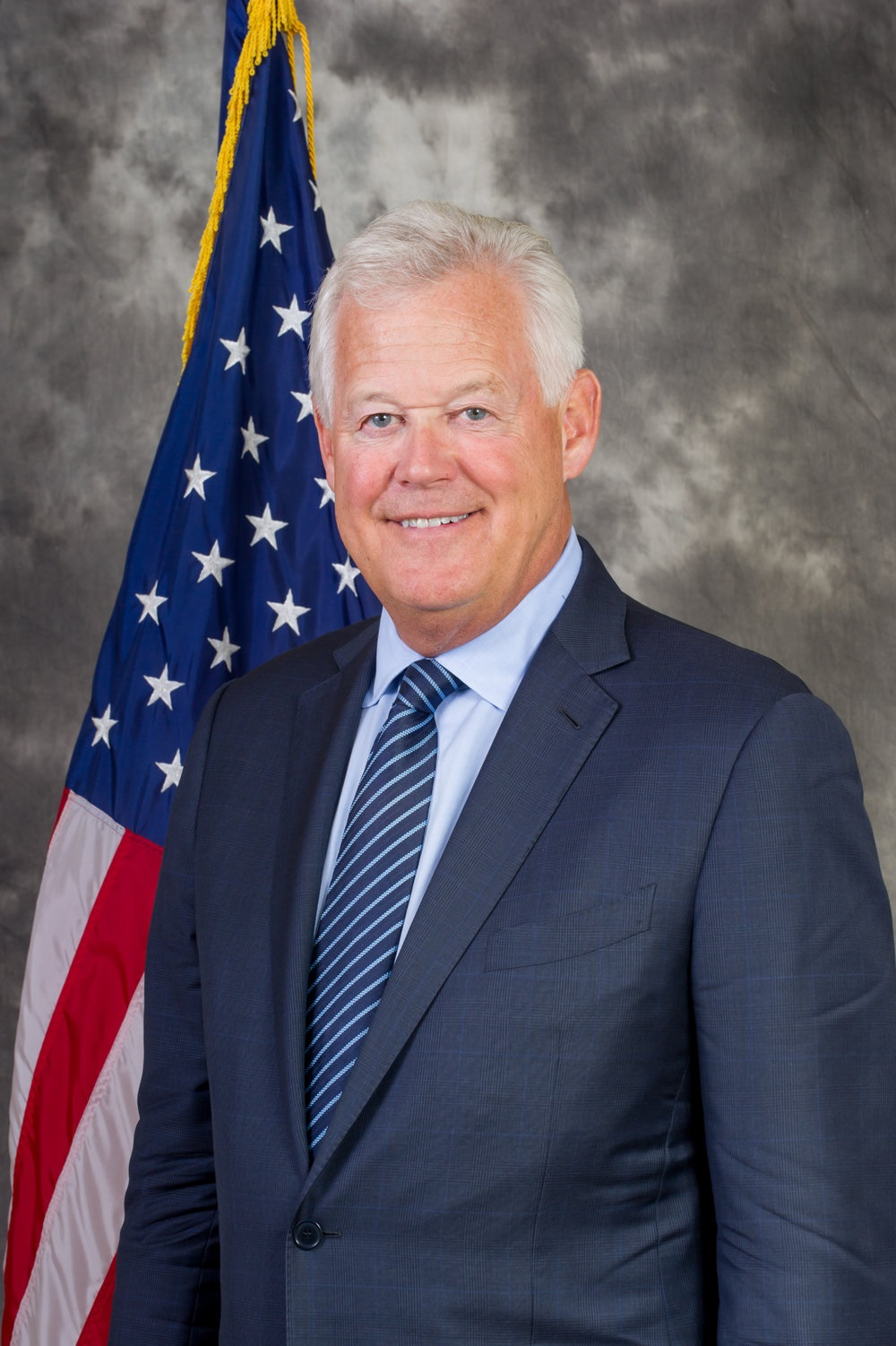
Official portrait, 2016

John W. Leslie, Jr., commonly known as Jack Leslie, is an American public relations executive, political consultant and international development activist. He is former chairman of Weber Shandwick, a global public relations firm, a role from which he retired in March 2022. President George W. Bush appointed him to the board of the U.S. African Development Foundation in 2003. In 2009, President Barack Obama appointed him chairman.

== Education and early career ==
Born in July, 1954 in Milwaukee, Wisconsin, Leslie initially aspired to be a physician. When he was 15, he received a scholarship from the English-Speaking Union of Oxford University, which stimulated his interested in International work. Leslie graduated from Georgetown University School of Foreign Service. He worked for Senator Edward M. Kennedy (D-MA) as legislative assistant and later as northeast regional director in the Kennedy for President campaign of 1980. After the presidential campaign, he served as executive director of the Fund for a Democratic Majority, a political action committee Kennedy founded to support Democratic candidates.

== Public relations career ==
In 1983, Leslie left Washington for New York City to join the media consultant David Sawyer, and in 1985 became president of Sawyer Miller Group, a campaign consulting and strategic communications firm.

Sawyer Miller Group was sold to the advertising firm Bozell Jacobs Kenyon & Eckhardt in 1992, then merged with Robinson Lake, a New York-based corporate communications consultancy chaired by Linda Robinson. The firm later split and became Bozell Sawyer Miller Group. Bozell was acquired by True North, which in turn was acquired by Interpublic Group (NYSE: IPG) in 2001. In 2001, Bozell Sawyer Miller Group (BSMG) was merged with Weber Shandwick. Leslie was named chairman, and Harris Diamond CEO.

During the 1980s and 1990s, Leslie provided political counsel to presidential and statewide campaigns in the United States, Latin America, Asia and Africa. He has advised five presidents of Colombia on peace and security initiatives, for which he received the Order of San Carlos, the highest honor Colombia gives to a non-citizen. Leslie served as a communications crisis advisor to the Port Authority of New York and New Jersey in the immediate aftermath of the 1993 World Trade Center bombing and to American Airlines following the attacks of September 11, 2001. Following the September 11 terrorist attacks, he testified before the House International Relations Committee on U.S. public diplomacy programs directed at the Muslim world. Leslie is a member of the Council on Foreign Relations, and served as a member of the group's Task Force on Terrorism and Public Diplomacy. He is also a member of the CuriosityStream Advisory Board.

== Nonprofit activities ==
Leslie has long been an activist in causes involving development, humanitarian assistance and global health. He was chairman of USA for UNHCR from 2003 to 2006 and participated in U.N. missions to Afghanistan, Kosovo and Tanzania. In addition to the Board of the U.S. African Development Foundation—whose USADF Leslie Award for high-performing grantees—Leslie also served on the advisory board of the International Business Leaders Forum (IBLF). He is former chairman of the Advisory Committee on Voluntary Foreign Aid of the U.S. Agency for International Development (ACVFA), former chairman of the Board of Advisors of the Duke Global Health Institute (DGHI), and chairman of the Board of Trustees of the Ron Brown Scholar Program (RBSP). He is also on the board of the Circumnavigators Foundation, an organization that provides scholarships for study abroad. Leslie is the chair of the board of the Elizabeth Glaser Pediatric AIDS Foundation and a member of the board of directors of Water.Org. In 2016, President Obama appointed him to the President's Advisory Council on Doing Business in Africa. In 2021, he joined the COVID Collaborative, which called for 70 percent of the world's population to be vaccinated against the novel coronavirus by the middle of 2022. In August 2021, members of the COVID Collaborative, including Leslie, published an open letter to world leaders in The Financial Times calling for urgent action on vaccination. He is a member of the executive committee of the Partnership for Central America, which seeks to promote inclusive economic growth in the Northern Triangle. In 2023, Leslie joined Georgetown University as a Distinguished Professor in the School of Health. He joined Duke University as a Senior Visiting Fellow at the Duke Global Health Institute (DGHI) and Visiting Fellow at the Duke-Margolis Center for Health Policy. Leslie also became a member of the National Institutes of Health Clinical Center Research Hospital Board.

== Personal life ==
Leslie is married to Caroline Pech, has three children and lives in Fairfield, Connecticut.
