= DRIFCA =

Consortium for climate risk insurance in Central America

Disaster Risk Insurance and Finance in Central America Consortium
- Abbreviation: DRIFCA
- Formation: 2022-11-16
- Founders: Partnership for Central America; World Bank; World Food Programme
- Type: Consortium
- Purpose: Development of climate-related agricultural insurance and disaster risk finance solutions
- Region served: Central America (Northern Triangle: Guatemala, El Salvador, Honduras)

The Disaster Risk Insurance and Finance in Central America Consortium (DRIFCA) is a consortium that was launched in November 2022 by the Partnership for Central America (PCA), World Bank (WB), and the World Food Programme (WFP) to identify and support climate-related agricultural insurance solutions for up to two million smallholder farmers in the Northern Triangle of Central America or North Central America (NCA) countries (Guatemala, El Salvador, and Honduras) to increase food security and financial resilience was announced at the 2022 United Nation Climate Change Conference (COP27).

== Official statements ==
The following are some of the official statements for the project:

Michel Kerf, World Bank Director for Central America and the Dominican Republic, stated:

At the World Bank, we recognize the need to enhance the financial resilience of smallholder farmers and vulnerable households affected by increasingly severe and frequent climate-related disasters in North Central America. Our global and regional experience has demonstrated the value of strong partnerships between the public and private sectors to design and implement effective disaster risk financing solutions.

Lola Castro, WFP Regional Director for Latin America and the Caribbean said:

Together we can support Central American smallholder farmers to mitigate risks related to climate shocks through scalable and sustainable transformation. Disaster Risk Finance is an innovative way to help smallholders effectively manage risks and reduce vulnerabilities so they can transition to sustainable food and nutrition security.

== Background ==
Agriculture is a key part of the economy of North Central America and key source of income and food security for poor and vulnerable populations there. Due to the region's location between the Pacific and Atlantic Oceans, the region is at risk to atmospheric, hydrometeorological, and geophysical perils. According to the International Disaster Database of EM-DAT, the NCA countries have been affected by naturals disasters at rate going from an average of 23 country-level disasters per decade from 1980–1999 to 57 from 2000 to 2019. The types of natural disasters include the following:

- Drought
- Flood
- Storm
- Wildfire

A strategy by governments and international development partners has been to prioritize the development of Disaster Risk Finance and Insurance (DRFI) solutions for the mitigation of extreme weather events and climate risks on the agricultural sector. From this, initial discussions were held in 2022 from the development of risk finance solutions for large-scale disasters, in order to improve the financial resilience of family farmers in the NCA countries (El Salvador, Honduras, and Guatemala). The organizations that were participants in this initial discussion were:

- Partnership for Central America (PCA): A non-profit, non-partisan, non-governmental organization that works with a multi-national coalition of private organizations to advance economic opportunity across underserved populations in the NCA countries.
- The United Nations World Food Programme (WFP): The world's largest humanitarian organization using food assistance to assist those who are recovering from natural disasters and the impact of climate change.
- The World Bank Group: An international finance organization providing loans to nations for international development.

== Project launch ==
On November 16, 2022, the PCA, the WFP, and the World Bank Group launched the Disaster Risk Insurance and Finance in Central America Consortium (DRIFCA) during the United Nations Climate Change Conference (COP27).
