= Elmer A. Stevens =

American politician (1862-1934)

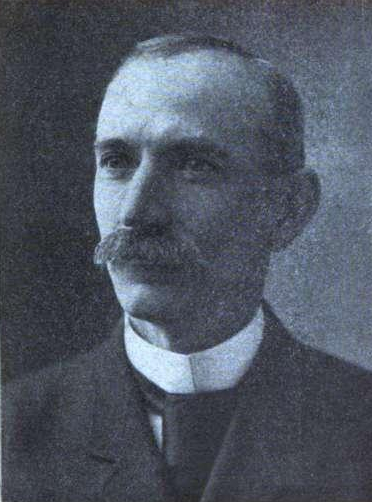
- Elmer A. Stevens circa 1912

37th Treasurer and Receiver-General of Massachusetts
- In office 1909–1914
- Governor: Eben Sumner Draper; Eugene Noble Foss
- Preceded by: Arthur Chapin
- Succeeded by: Frederick W. Mansfield

Massachusetts Senate Third Middlesex District
- In office 1906–1909
- Preceded by: John M. Woods
- Succeeded by: Charles V. Blanchard

Member of the Massachusetts House of Representatives
- In office 1904–1905

Member of the Massachusetts House of Representatives
- In office 1896–1896

Personal details
- Born: January 15, 1862 Anson, Maine, U.S.
- Died: 1934 (aged 71–72)
- Party: Republican
- Profession: Provision Dealer

Elmer A. Stevens (January 15, 1862 – 1934) was an American politician who served as a member of the Massachusetts House of Representatives the Massachusetts State Senate, and as the Treasurer and Receiver-General of Massachusetts.

== See also ==
- 130th Massachusetts General Court (1909)

== Bibliography ==
- Who's Who in State Politics, 1912, Boston, Massachusetts: Practical Politics (1912), p. 39.
- Who's Who in State Politics, 1908, Boston, Massachusetts: Practical Politics, (1908), p. 81.

Party political offices
Preceded by Arthur Chapin	Republican nominee for Treasurer and Receiver-General of Massachusetts; 1910, 1911, 1912	Succeeded by Charles L. Burrill
Political offices
Preceded by John M. Woods	Massachusetts State Senator; Third Middlesex District; January 1906-1909	Succeeded by Charles V. Blanchard
Preceded by Arthur B. Chapin	Treasurer and Receiver-General of Massachusetts; 1909 – 1914	Succeeded by Frederick W. Mansfield
