= Partnership for Central America =

Public Private Partnership in International Development for Central America

- Founded: 2021; 4 years ago
- Fields: Public Private Partnership International Development
- Board of directors: Ajay Banga, Board Co-Chairman; Blanca Treviño, Board Co-Chair; Ray Chambers, Vice-Chairman; Luis Alberto Moreno; Hamdi Ulukaya; Klaus Schwab; Brad Smith; Jack Leslie; Michelle Nunn; Guillaume Le Cunff, Helene Gayle; Michael Froman
- Key people: Jonathan Fantini Porter, Executive Director and CEO
- Affiliations: Memorandum of Understanding with U.S. State Department, USAID, and the World Bank
- Funding: $3.2 billion in commitments (as of January 2023).
- Website: www.centampartnership.org

The Partnership for Central America (PCA) is a public–private partnership focused on economic development in the Northern Triangle of Central America countries (Honduras, Guatemala, and El Salvador) addresses the economic roots of migration with job creation and social programs. The Partnership is a registered 501(c)3 non-profit organization that was launched in May 2021 with Vice President Kamala Harris in support of the White House Call to Action to the Private Sector to Deepen Investment in the Northern Triangle.

== Partners ==
The Partnership cites 75 strategic partners, including the:

- U.S. Department of State
- U.S. Agency for International Development
- Accion, Chobani, Davivienda, Duolingo, and Bancolombia
- Harvard T.H. Chan School of Public Health
- Mastercard, Microsoft, Nespresso, and Pro Mujer
- Tent Partnership for Refugees and the Bush Presidential Center
- World Economic Forum, CARE International, and Visa
- Millicom, Grupo Mariposa, and PriceSmart,
- The World Bank Group and Inter-American Development Bank.

The partnership has a Memorandum of Understanding (MOU) with the U.S. Department of State and USAID.

== Organization ==
The organization is co-chaired by Ajay Banga and Blanca Trevino and led by Jonathan Fantini Porter. On February 23, 2023, Banga was nominated by President Joe Biden to lead the World Bank.

== Mission ==
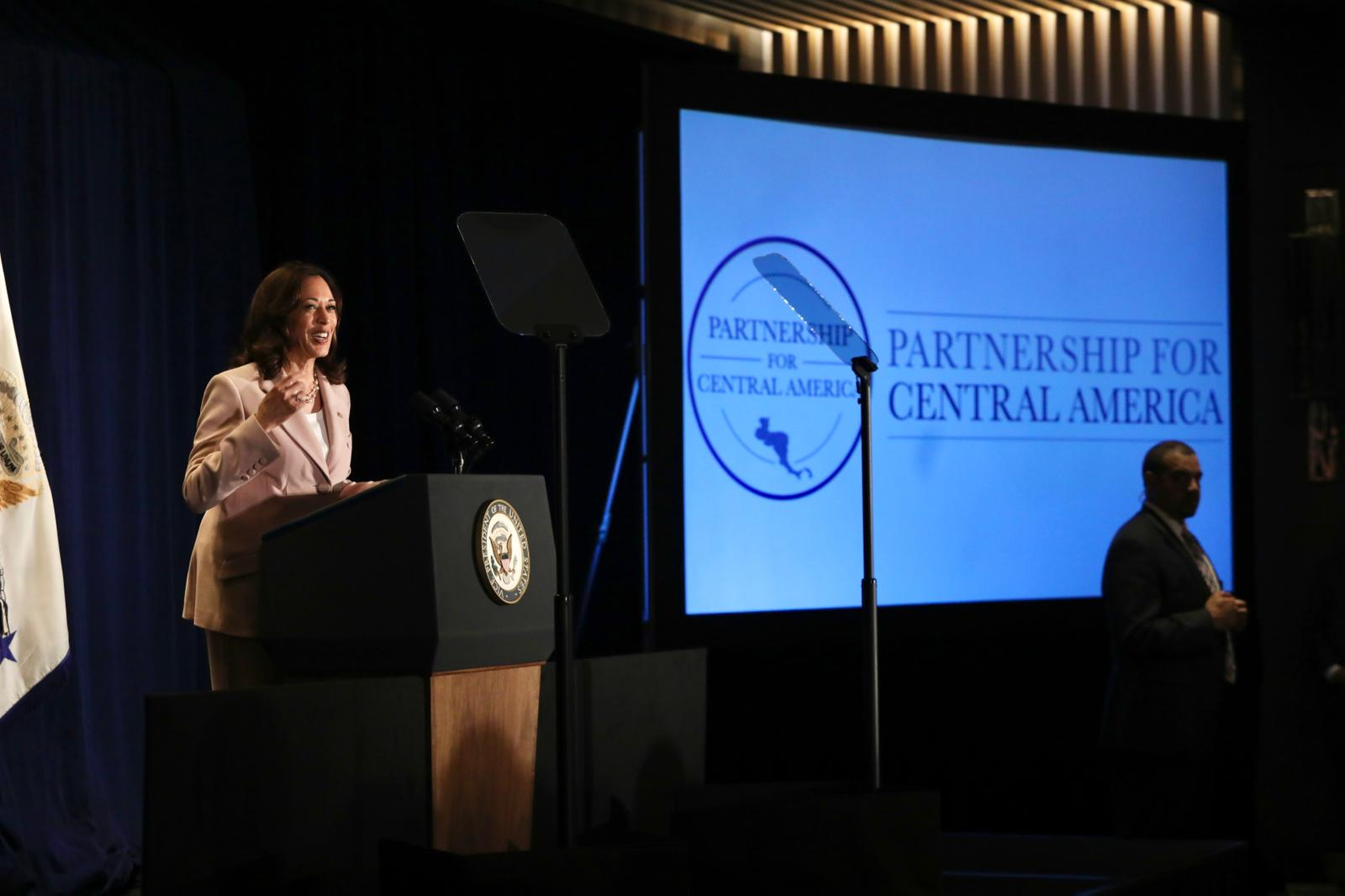
Vice President Kamala Harris launching PCA's in Her Hands initiative at the Summit of the Americas

The Partnership's stated mission is to reduce the root causes of poverty in Northern Central America to stem migration from El Salvador, Honduras, and Guatemala. To achieve this, the organization is mobilizing foreign direct investment and social investments to create one million new jobs and facilitate an enabling environment for investment through seven areas, including digital access, financial inclusion, job skilling, and women's empowerment. According to the website, their objectives include:

- Skill building for 250,000 individuals,
- Digital access for 5 million individual
- Financial inclusion for 11.5 million individuals
- Empowering 5 million women

== Programs ==
The Partnership has mobilized $3.2 billion in investments. It has focused on seven programs areas, including banking and financial inclusion, capital access, digital access, and job creation and skilling in business processes, production, and agriculture. In 2022, the Partnership was nominated for the P3 Impact Award, an award created by Concordia, the University of Virginia Darden School for Business, and the Office of Global Partnerships of the U.S. Department of State, as a leading Public Private Partnership model for bringing 450,000 individuals into the formal economy with Mastercard, connecting 4 million individuals with broadband access through Microsoft and Millicom; and $100 million in procurement contracts, including Nespresso sourcing the first coffee from Honduras

== Social Challenge ==
The Partnership's work is focused on addressing the root economic drivers of irregular migration from Guatemala, Honduras, and El Salvador to the United States, which is rooted in a complex mix of factors, including poverty and lack of economic opportunity, violence, weak governance and corruption, natural disasters, and a desire for family reunification. Of these challenges, poverty and lack of economic opportunity stand out as the leading driver for more than 74% of intended migrants.

A number of factors contribute to the challenge. Structural impediments and stagnant economic growth fail to create the number of quality formal jobs that the region's growing labor force requires. This is caused by low levels of foreign and domestic private sector investment; low labor productivity and a lack of skilled workers; high levels of labor informality; and challenges in promoting the rule of law, sound governance, and legal certainty. As a result, nearly 10 percent of the populations of Honduras, El Salvador, and Guatemala have left their homes in recent years.

== Recent Projects ==
Corporate Social Responsibility

In August 2022, PCA and the World Economic Forum launched an initiative to advance the implementation of environmental, social and governance (ESG) reporting standards and the adoption of various stakeholder metrics by the private sector.

In Her Hands

In June 2022, at the Summit of the Americas, PCA launched the women's empowerment initiative in Her Hands with Vice President Kamala Harris and Laurene Powell Jobs

The project will connect "1.4 million women and their communities to the financial system and digital economy, training more than 500,000 women and girls in high-tech skills and expanding gender parity in the private sector."

Crop Insurance

In November 2022, PCA, the World Bank, and the United Nations World Food Programme launched the Disaster Risk and Insurance in Central America (DRIFCA) to support climate-related agricultural insurance solutions for 2 million smallholder farmers in Guatemala, El Salvador, and Honduras to increase their food security and financial resilience.

=== Root Causes Strategy ===
Root Causes Strategy is a federal government/private sector approach to address the root causes of illegal immigration into the United States from the Northern Triangle of Central America). On March 25, 2024, the PCA, Vice President Harris, and U.S. Department of State announced private sector commitments totaling more than $3.2 billion for the project.

== Public Private Partnership Functions ==
The Partnership operates six business units:

=== Deal Facilitation ===
PCA identifies, diligences, and builds relationships to deliver deals and financing between partners with investable, high-impact projects and potential investors.

=== Shaping Joint ventures ===
PCA facilitates partnerships between private entities, government agencies, and nonprofits at the executive level to ensure the required ownership to mobilize groundbreaking investments in Northern Central America (e.g., Mastercard and Microsoft to support digitization of small businesses across the region).

=== Government Dialogue ===
PCA works with governments, regional governments, multilateral organizations, and development banks to facilitate dialogue between governments and the private sector and support the development of a business environment that is conducive to job growth.

=== Convening and Working Groups ===
The organization convenes dialogue amongst corporate, policy, and community leaders. PCA calls upon thought-leaders and systems-change advocates in forum settings to resolve barriers to change, identify areas of need, and facilitate collaboration.

=== Communications ===
PCA amplifies communications across all partners and manages communications campaigns

=== Accountability and Metrics ===
PCA tracks the impact of partners’ work to enable information sharing and progress in their commitments. and maintains a dashboard that contains community-level impact data to inform strategic investments in partnership with the Harvard T.H. Chan School of Public Health, and Gallup.
