= Root Causes Strategy =

Root Causes Strategy (RCS) or U.S. Strategy to Address the Root Causes of Migration in Central America is a federal government/private sector approach to address the root causes of illegal immigration into the United States from Guatemala, El Salvador, and Honduras (collectively called the Northern Triangle of Central America).

The strategy was initiated on February 2, 2021 when President Biden signed an Executive Order that called for the development of this plan. The plan, led by Vice President Harris, consists of private sector investment into the Northern Triangle countries in order to develop the region and curb illegal immigration into the U.S..

== Five pillars ==
The strategy consists of five pillars:

- Pillar I: Addressing economic insecurity and inequality;
- Pillar II: Combating corruption, strengthening democratic governance, and advancing the rule of law;
- Pillar III: Promoting respect for human rights, labor rights, and free press;
- Pillar IV: Countering and preventing violence, extortion, and other crimes perpetrated by criminal gangs, trafficking networks, and other organized criminal organizations; and
- Pillar V: Combating sexual, gender-based, and domestic violence.

== Chronology of events ==
In February 2021, President Biden signed the Executive Order Creating a Comprehensive Regional Framework to Address the Causes of Migration, to Manage Migration Throughout North and Central America, and to Provide Safe and Orderly Processing of Asylum Seekers at the United States Border. The order is referred to as the Collaborative Migration Management Strategy (Migration Strategy).

The following is the chronology of the events in terms of actions by Vice President Harris:

- In May 2021, a Call to Action for businesses and social enterprises to make significant commitments to promote economic opportunity for people in the Northern Triangle of Central America was launched.
- In July 2021, the U.S. Strategy to Address the Root Causes of Migration or Root Causes Strategy (RCS) was launched with the Biden-Harris Administration releasing the strategy and five pillars of the strategy.
- In December 2021, $1.2 billion in private sector commitments were announced by the vice president.
- In May 2021, the Partnership for Central America (PCA), a public–private partnership focused on economic development in the Northern Triangle of Central America.
- In February 2023, the vice president announced the launch of Central America Forward, which is a framework for addressing good governance and labor rights in the goals and objectives of the PCA.
- On March 25, 2024, the vice president, U.S. Department of State, and the PCA announced private sector commitments totaling more than $3.2 billion.

== Criticism and analysis ==
According to the Associated Press article Takeaways: Harris’ approach to migration was more nuanced than critics or allies portray it:

Migration from those three Central American countries did gradually drop, though experts say it’s unlikely that Harris’ plan was a major factor.

Ariel Ruiz Soto, a senior policy analyst with the Migration Policy Institute, a nonpartisan research group stated:

It was focused on a long-term scenario and it was focused on countries that are no longer the primary sending countries.

== USAID 2023 Results ==
In a 2023 report to Congress by the United States Agency for International Development (USAID), examples of the success were reported in terms of the pillars of the program:

2023 Report Results
Pillar	Very Robust (Note: Very Robust: Exceeding targets and increasing two results two years in a row.)	Robust (Note: Robust: Exceeding targets, but decreasing results compared to previous results.)
I	Success with assisting in the use of technology and assistance to small to medium-sized businesses.	Jobs, education reach, workforce development training, and children's nutrition
II	Anti-corruption training	Justice sector personnel
III	Human rights defenders, labor rights actors, and rights of journalists	
IV	Youth crime and violence prevention	
V		Gender-based violence crimes
