= Edwin F. Leonard =

American politician

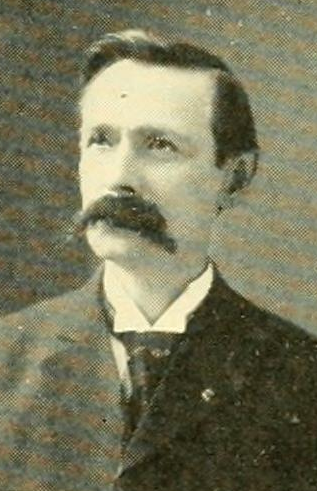
- Edwin F. Leonard in 1907 as a Member of the Massachusetts House of Representatives

37th Mayor of Springfield, Massachusetts
- In office 1921–1924
- Preceded by: Arthur A. Adams
- Succeeded by: Fordis C. Parker

Member of the Springfield, Massachusetts Board of Aldermen Ward 2
- In office 1918–1920

Member of the Massachusetts House of Representatives 3rd Hampden District
- In office 1906–1907

Personal details
- Born: July 15, 1862 Belmont, New Hampshire
- Died: November 1931 (aged 69)
- Party: Republican
- Profession: Druggist

Edwin F. Leonard (July 15, 1862 – November 1931) was an American druggist and politician who served in the Massachusetts House of Representatives and as the 37th Mayor of Springfield, Massachusetts.

== Trivia ==
In 1907, while he was in Massachusetts House of Representatives, Leonard served on the House Committee on Mercantile Affairs with future president Calvin Coolidge.

Political offices
Preceded by Arthur A. Adams	37th Mayor of Springfield, Massachusetts; 1921–1924	Succeeded by Fordis C. Parker
