= Francke W. Dickinson =

American politician (1849–1922)

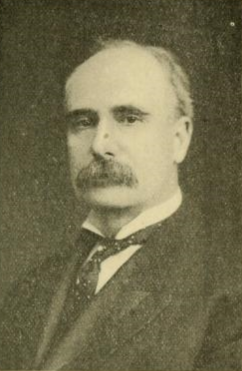
- Dickinson as a member of the Massachusetts Senate

Member of the Massachusetts Senate from the First Hampden district
- In office 1908–1909
- Preceded by: William P. Hayes
- Succeeded by: Thomas S. Walsh

Mayor of Springfield, Massachusetts
- In office 1905–1907
- Preceded by: Everett E. Stone
- Succeeded by: William E. Sanderson

Personal details
- Born: April 19, 1849 Springfield, Massachusetts, U.S.
- Died: April 7, 1922 (aged 72) St. Petersburg, Florida, U.S.
- Party: Republican

Francke Walden Dickinson (April 19, 1849 – April 7, 1922) was an American politician who was mayor of Springfield, Massachusetts from 1905 to 1907 and a member of the Massachusetts Senate from 1908 to 1909.

== Early life ==
Dickinson was born in Springfield, Massachusetts on April 19, 1849. He was the second son of Elijah W. and Mary A. (Crossett) Dickinson. On January 16, 1873, he married Katie May Allgood of Cincinnati, Ohio. They had three children – Emma Allgood (1873–1884), Ethel May (1875–1910), and Henry Walden (1876–1896).

== Business ==
Dickinson's father was an undertaker and in 1873, Dickinson, and his brother Arthur, formed the firm E. W. Dickson & Sons with their father. Elijah and Francke Dickinson bought out Arthur's interest the following year. Dickinson became the sole proprietor after his father's death. George W. Streeter began working with Dickinson in 1900 and was made a partner in 1910.

== Politics ==
Dickinson was a member of the Springfield Common Council from 1888 to 1890 and was council president in 1890. From 1903 to 1904, he was a member of the board of aldermen. In 1904, he was the Republican nominee for mayor and defeated Democratic Patrick J. Mitchell 4,905 votes to 4,181. He beat Mitchell in a rematch the following year, this time by an increased plurality of 792.

In 1907, Dickinson sought the First Hampden district seat in the Massachusetts Senate. He defeated former mayor and incumbent state senator William P. Hayes by 11 votes. It was the first time Hayes had ever lost an election. He defeated Democratic and Independence League candidate Richard A. Hennessey 60% to 33% in the 1908 Massachusetts Senate election. He was chairman of the committee on elections laws in the 1908 Massachusetts legislature and chaired the committee on cities in the 1909 Massachusetts legislature.

== Later life ==
Dickinson retired in 1919 and began spending his winters in Florida. He died on April 7, 1922, at his home in St. Petersburg, Florida. He was survived by his wife and one grandson.
