= Fordis C. Parker =

American politician

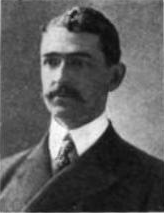

38th Mayor of Springfield, Massachusetts
- In office 1925–1929
- Preceded by: Edwin F. Leonard
- Succeeded by: Dwight R. Winter

Member of the Massachusetts Senate First Hampden District
- In office 1905–1906
- Preceded by: Henry F. Sampson
- Succeeded by: William P. Hayes

Member of the Massachusetts House of Representatives Fourth Hampden District
- In office 1901–1904

Member of the Springfield, Massachusetts Board of Aldermen Ward Five
- In office 1899–1900
- Preceded by: Charles C. Lewis
- Succeeded by: Henry H. Bosworth

President of the Springfield, Massachusetts Common Council
- In office 1898–1898
- Preceded by: Frank W. Barker
- Succeeded by: Fred O. Clapp

Member of the Springfield, Massachusetts Common Council Ward Five
- In office 1898–1898

Member of the Springfield, Massachusetts Common Council Ward Eight
- In office 1897–1897

Personal details
- Born: January 3, 1868 Wales, Massachusetts
- Died: February 10, 1945 (aged 77) Springfield, Massachusetts
- Party: Republican
- Spouse: Nellie Frances Puffer

Fordis Clifford Parker (1868-1945) was an American politician who served in both branches of the Massachusetts legislature, and in both branches of the city council, and as the 38th mayor of Springfield, Massachusetts.

Political offices
Preceded by Edwin F. Leonard	38th Mayor of Springfield, Massachusetts; 1925–1929	Succeeded by Dwight R. Winter
Preceded by Henry F. Sampson	Member of the Massachusetts Senate; First Hampden District; 1905–1906	Succeeded by William P. Hayes
Preceded by Charles C. Lewis	Member of the Springfield, Massachusetts; Board of Aldermen; Ward Five; 1899–1900	Succeeded by Henry H. Bosworth
Preceded by Frank W. Barker	President of the Springfield, Massachusetts; Common Council; 1898–1898	Succeeded by Fred O. Clapp
