= Jonathan Fantini Porter =

United States Government official

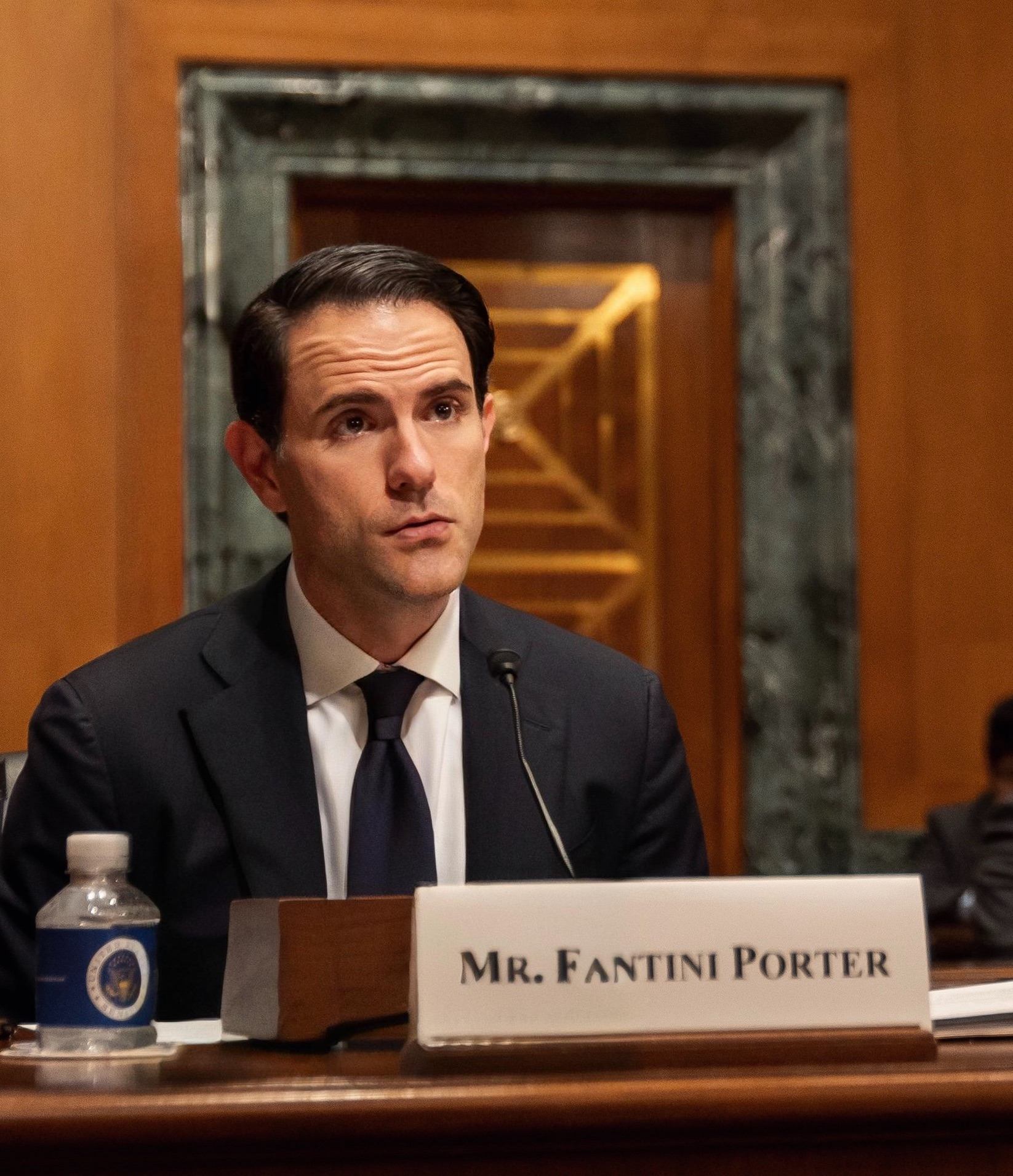
- Fantini Porter testifying to the U.S. Senate Finance Committee in 2023
- Education: Harvard Kennedy School of Government; Georgetown University
- Occupation(s): Government official, business executive

Jonathan Fantini Porter is an American government official and executive in the private and social sectors. He is CEO of the public-private Partnership for Central America and previously held leadership positions at the U.S. Department of Homeland Security, The White House, U.S. Congress, and McKinsey & Company.

== Career ==
As of 2023, Fantini Porter is executive director and CEO of the White House public-private Partnership for Central America. Under his tenure, the organization raised $4.2 billion in foreign direct investment, procurement, and lending and delivered programs to 5 million individuals across Environmental, social, and corporate governance programs to address the economic roots of migration in frontier and emerging markets.

He previously was an Associate Partner at McKinsey & Company; advisor on national security and private sector engagement to the Presidential transition of Joe Biden; a White House advisor on transnational security during the Presidency of Barack Obama; as a senior congressional aide in the U.S. Congress; and Chief of Staff in the U.S. Department of Homeland Security where he oversaw management operations of a $6 billion homeland security budget supporting 22,000 personnel in 48 countries.

He has been on advisory bodies to the U.N. High Commissioner for Refugees, World Economic Forum, and Amnesty International, and as a consulting fellow at the International Institute for Strategic Studies.

== Education ==
Fantini Porter is a graduate of the Harvard Kennedy School of Government and Georgetown University and was awarded an Eisenhower Fellowship.
