= Lawson Sibley =

American politician (1836-1898)

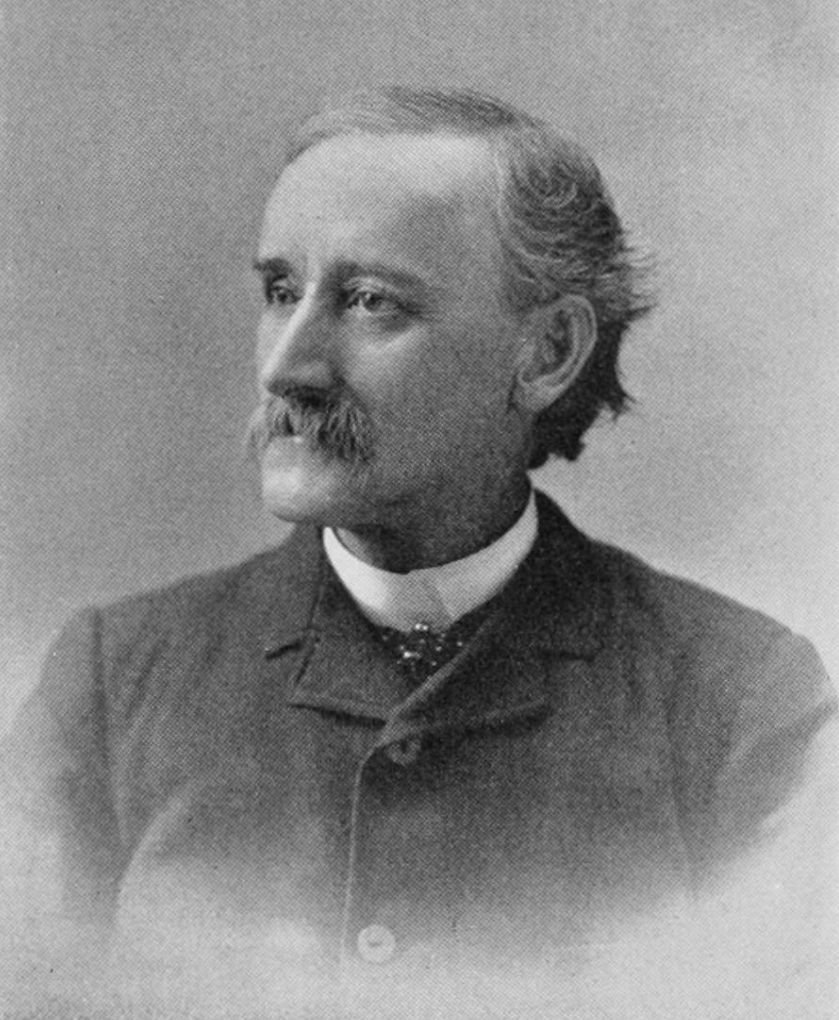

22nd Mayor of Springfield, Massachusetts
- In office 1892–1892
- Preceded by: Edward S. Bradford
- Succeeded by: Edmund P. Kendrick

County Commissioner of Hampden County, Massachusetts
- In office 1873–1876
- Succeeded by: N. S. Hubbard

Personal details
- Born: 1836 Barre, Massachusetts
- Died: March 18, 1898 (aged 61–62) Springfield, Massachusetts
- Political party: Democratic
- Spouse: Harriet Emmons Aiken (m. 1863)
- Profession: Flour and feed business

Lawson Sibley (1836 – March 18, 1898) was an American businessman and politician who served as the Mayor of Springfield, Massachusetts in 1892.

== Biography ==
Lawson Sibley was born in Barre, Massachusetts in 1836. He married Harriet Emmons Aiken in 1863, and they had two daughters. He worked in the flour and feed business.

A Democrat, he served as county commissioner of Hampden County, Massachusetts from 1873 to 1876.

He died at his home in Springfield on March 18, 1898.

== Notes ==
Political offices
Preceded by Edward S. Bradford	Mayor of Springfield, Massachusetts; 1902 – 1902	Succeeded by Edmund P. Kendrick
