= Robert Selander =

Robert W. Selander was the president and chief executive officer of MasterCard until 1 July 2010 when he was succeeded by Ajay Banga. He had held this position since April 1997. Before that he spent 20 years with Citibank, where he developed their global branch network and managed Citibank's Diners Club International credit card business throughout the United States, Canada and Europe.

== Early life and career ==
Selander earned his undergraduate degree in industrial engineering from Cornell University in 1972 and was a member of the Quill and Dagger society and the Sigma Chi Fraternity. He earned his MBA from the Harvard Business School. In 2005 Selander was presented with a Doctor of International Business Honoris Causa from Richmond The American International University in London.

Selander serves on the Board of Directors of Western Union Company, HealthEquity, Inc., and Fidelity Equity and High Income. He also served on the Board of Directors of MasterCard Incorporated, MasterCard International and Hartford Financial Services Group Inc.

In February 2006, Selander had surgery for prostate cancer, which delayed the initial public offering of MasterCard.
