= Pequotsepos Manor =

Historic house in Connecticut

- U.S. National Register of Historic Places
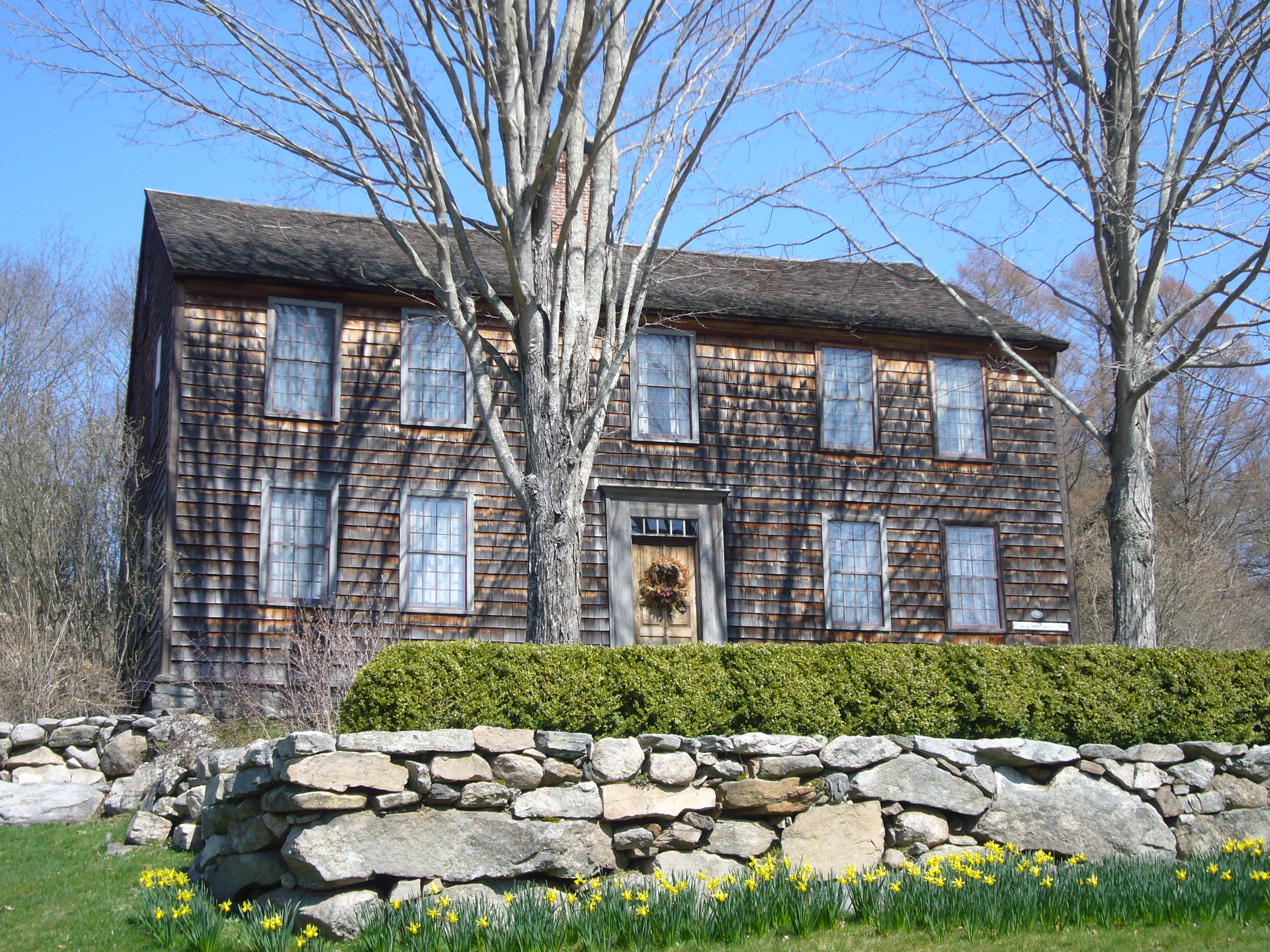

- Location within Connecticut Location within the United States
- Location: 120 Pequotsepos Road, Mystic, Connecticut
- Coordinates: 41°21′46″N 71°56′54″W
- Area: 9.3 acres (3.8 ha)
- Built: 1717
- NRHP reference No.: 79002650
- Added to NRHP: June 15, 1979

Pequotsepos Manor, known formally as Denison Homestead, is a historic house museum at 120 Pequotsepos Road in Mystic, Connecticut. The house was built in 1717 and stands on land that has been in continuous ownership of the Denison family since 1654. It is now owned and operated by the family-run Denison Society, and was added to the National Register of Historic Places on June 15, 1979.

== Description ==
The Denison Homestead is located in a rural setting of eastern Mystic on Pequotsepos Road, roughly midway between Mistuxet Avenue and Jerry Browne Road. The house is set facing south on the north side at a bend in the road. It is a 2 1/2-story timber-frame structure, with a gabled roof, central chimney, and shingled exterior, and is set mainly on a rock ledge, with only a small basement area in one corner. The main facade is five bays wide, with the entrance at the center. The door itself dates to about 1800, but is mounted using original iron strap hinges. The interior follows a central chimney plan, with a narrow entry vestibule that also houses a winding stair. There are parlor spaces on either side of the chimney, with the kitchen behind. The parlors have modestly carved fireplace paneling, and many rooms have original floorboards that are up to 2 feet (0.61 m) wide.

== History ==
The house was built in 1717 by George Denison (1690–1777). It was the third Denison-built house to stand on the property, which had been granted to an older George Denison (1620–1694) in 1654. The elder George Denison initially built a primitive home, and later built his "grate house". This second house burned down on the eve of his grandson's wedding, so the younger George Denison built a new home using salvaged timber from his grandfather's house. The Denison Society was established in 1930 and took over the Manor in 1941. In 1946, architect J. Frederick Kelly restored the house as a museum. The manor underwent additional renovations beginning in 2006.

== See also ==
- National Register of Historic Places listings in New London County, Connecticut
