= Elisha B. Maynard =

American politician (1842-1906)

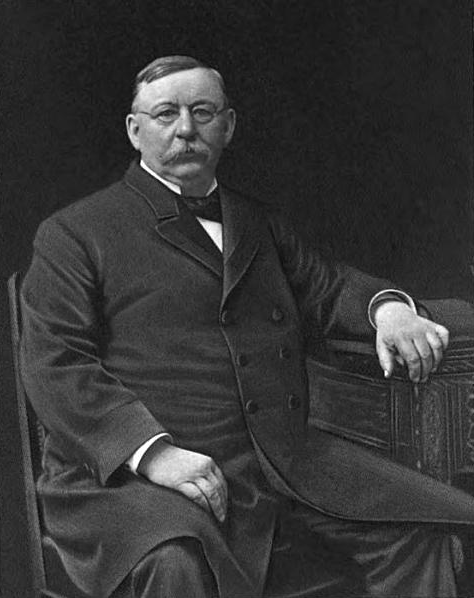

20th Mayor of Springfield, Massachusetts
- In office 1887–1888
- Preceded by: Edwin D. Metcalf
- Succeeded by: Edward S. Bradford

Member of the Massachusetts House of Representatives
- In office 1879–1879

Member of the Springfield, Massachusetts City Council
- In office 1871–1872

Personal details
- Born: November 21, 1842 Wilbraham, Massachusetts
- Died: May 28, 1906 (aged 63) Springfield, Massachusetts
- Party: Democratic

Elisha Burr Maynard (November 21, 1842 – May 28, 1906) was an American attorney and politician who served on the city council and as Mayor of Springfield, Massachusetts and as an associate justice of the Massachusetts Superior Court.

Legal offices
Preceded by	Associate Justice of the Massachusetts Superior Court; June 30, 1891 – May 28, 1906	Succeeded by
Political offices
Preceded by Edwin D. Metcalf	20th Mayor of Springfield, Massachusetts; 1887–1888	Succeeded by Edward S. Bradford
