= List of close election results =

This is a list of close election results on the national level and within administrative divisions. It lists results that have been decided by a margin of less than 1 vote in 1,000 (a margin of less than 0.1 percentage points): single-winner elections where the winning candidate was less than 0.1% ahead of the second-placed candidate, as well as party-list elections where a party was less than 0.1% short of the electoral threshold or two lists that obtained seats are less than 0.1% apart. This list is limited to elections in which at least 1,000 votes were cast.

To provide context, the section on "Distribution of elections" shows the distribution of winning margins in different areas. Depending on the area, from 1 in 40 to 1 in 500 election contests is decided by less than 1 vote in 1,000.

According to a 2001 study of state and federal elections in the United States between 1898 and 1992, "one of every 100,000 votes cast in U.S. [House of Representatives] elections, and one of every 15,000 votes cast in state [legislative] elections, 'mattered' in the sense that they were cast for a candidate that officially tied or won by one vote."

While not an election, a member of Congress once owed his seat to the drawing of lots. In 1902, after more than 7,000 votes at three conventions, the Democrats were unable to decide among three candidates for nomination to Texas's 12th congressional district. Two candidates put their names in a hat, drew one out and the loser agreed to withdraw and support the winner. Oscar W. Gillespie won the game of lots, the nomination and the following general election, serving in Congress for eight years.

There are a variety of ways in which tied elections are settled. Some are decided by drawing lots or other games of chance. Others lead to a runoff or special election. Still others are decided by some third party such as the legislature or a high-ranking elected official. In one case in Waynetown, Indiana, in 1891, two candidates for town treasurer agreed to settle their 339–339 tie by a foot-race. However, despite some fictionalized accounts, the town board overruled the agreement and determined that then-incumbent William Simms would remain in office for another term, and the proposed race never occurred.

== Table of close national and state elections ==
=== Tied elections ===
Year	Country / region	Election	District/race	Total votes cast for winner	Description
1985	(Australia) (Victoria (state))	Victorian Legislative Council	Nunawading	54,821	Bob Ives tied with Rosemary Varty, but won the seat with a vote cast by the returning officer, who drew Ives' name from a hat. Adding to the drama, the seat decided control of the Legislative Council. Before Ives could take his seat, the result was voided by a Court of Disputed Returns on the grounds that 44 votes had been incorrectly excluded from the count, and the court ordered a by-election. Varty then won the by-election.
2011	(Switzerland)	Swiss federal	Ticino	23,979	Marco Romano and Monica Duca Widmer both had 23,979 votes. Initially, a computer program was used to draw lots and Widmer was declared the winner. Following complaints and appeals, the Federal Supreme Court ruled against the Canton's decision to use a computer program for the lottery and ordered a new manual lottery. This was conducted on November 25 and Marco Romano emerged as the winner. (There were 760,995 votes cast in total for 8 seats. The PPD won two seats. Romano and Widmer, both of the PPD, were tied for the PPD's second seat.)
1994	(Canada) (Quebec)	National Assembly of Quebec	Saint-Jean	16,536	Incumbent Liberal Michel Charbonneau tied with Parti Québécois candidate Roger Paquin. Consequently, a new vote was held 42 days later, which Paquin won by 532 votes.
1971	(United States) (Virginia)	Virginia House of Delegates	District 19	16,410	The initial vote count had Republican William Moss ahead of Democrat Jim Burch by 1 vote for the sixth at-large seat in what was then a six-member district. But then a three-judge circuit court ruled that one of the ballots was "defaced" because the names of two candidates were crossed out with the notation "Do not desire to vote for these two". They did this even though the person who cast this vote (which was known because it was a signed absentee ballot) testified that he intended to vote for Moss. Throwing out the ballot created a tied vote. The names of the two candidates were placed in sealed envelopes, and a blindfolded Elections Board chairman plucked one from a silver loving cup. Moss won. Two years later Moss would lose re-election by 0.03% of the vote.
2003	(Canada) (Quebec)	National Assembly of Quebec	Champlain	11,852	PQ candidate Noëlla Champagne tied with Liberal Pierre Brouillette. Consequently, a new vote was held 36 days later, which Champagne won by 642 votes.
2017	(United States) (Virginia)	Virginia House of Delegates	District 94	11,608	The initial vote count had incumbent Republican David Yancey ahead by 13 votes. After a canvas that included provisional ballots, Yancey's lead was cut to 10 votes. Following a recount, Yancey trailed Democratic challenger Shelly Simonds by one vote out of 23,215 cast. After review by a three-judge panel appointed by the Virginia Supreme Court, a disputed ballot that had been excluded as an overvote was instead counted for Yancey and the race was certified as a tie with the candidates to draw lots to determine a winner. The drawing of lots was later postponed after Simonds asked a state court to reconsider the disputed ballot. On January 4, 2018, the names of each candidate were placed inside a film canister, both canisters were placed in a bowl and one canister was drawn at random by State Board of Elections chairman James Alcorn. David Yancey won the draw and the seat, giving Republicans control of the House 51–49. Had Simonds won instead, a 50–50 split would have prompted a power sharing arrangement between the two major parties. In 2019, the two met in a rematch in a redrawn district and Simonds won.
2010	(United States) (Massachusetts)	Massachusetts House of Representatives	6th Worcester district	6,587	After Peter J. Durant was initially declared the winner by 1 vote, judge Richard T. Tucker ruled that one absentee ballot that was initially discarded was to be counted for Geraldo Alicea creating an exact tie. Six months later, a special election was held where Durant beat Alicea by 56 votes.
1963	(Canada) (Quebec)	House of Commons of Canada	Pontiac–Témiscamingue	6,448	Paul Martineau (Progressive Conservative) and Paul-Oliva Goulet (Liberal) each received 6,448 votes in the Québec electoral district of Pontiac–Témiscamingue. Because the vote was tied, the returning officer cast his vote for Martineau.
1988	(United States) (Massachusetts)	Massachusetts Senate Democratic primary	Plymouth District	4,543	George F. Buckley and Michael Creedon tied, but Creedon secured the nomination and later the seat.
1996	(United States) (South Dakota)	South Dakota House of Representatives	District 12	4,191	Four candidates, Democrats John R. McIntyre and Dick Casey; and Republicans Hal Wick and Judy Rost, were contesting two seats. In the initial tally, they had respectively 4195 (24.73%), 3889 (22.93%), 4191 (24.71%), and 4687 (27.63%) votes (16,962 total votes). McIntyre was initially declared to have been elected by a four-vote margin. Wick petitioned for a recount in accordance with SDCL 12-21-12. The recount was conducted in the presence of representatives for both candidates. The results were certified on December 4, 1996, and showed that Wick had been elected by one vote: 4191 (24.71%), 3891 (22.94%), 4192 (24.71%), 4689 (27.64%) (16,963 total votes). The South Dakota Supreme Court examined several ballots and invalidated one vote for Wick. The House then voted, mostly along party lines, 46–20 to seat Wick. Remarkably, two years later, McIntyre and Wick would again tie (at least on the initial count).
2008	(United States) (West Virginia)	West Virginia House of Delegates	District 10	3,304	Four candidates were vying for three spots in the Democratic nomination primary. In initial returns, Iris McCrady appeared to place third, beating out Tim Fittro for the third nomination by three votes. However, after the canvass, McCrady and Fittro were shown to be tied with both receiving 3,304 votes, with Daniel Poling placing second and Brenda K. Brum placing first, with 4,437 and 5,329 votes respectively. A coin was tossed to break the tie, and McCrady won the toss, becoming the third Democratic nominee. McCrady went on to lose the general election, placing sixth in a field of three Democrats and three Republicans.
1999	(Canada) (Nova Scotia)	Nova Scotia House of Assembly	Shelburne	3,206	Progressive Conservative Cecil O'Donnell tied with Liberal Clifford Huskilson (3,206–3,206). The returning officer broke the tie by pulling Mr. O'Donnell's name from a box.
1886	(United Kingdom)	House of Commons of the United Kingdom	Ashton-under-Lyne	3,049	Conservative incumbent John Edmund Wentworth Addison and Liberal challenger (and English cricketer) Alexander Butler Rowley were tied, 3,049–3,049. The Returning Officer (and also mayor) James Walker broke the tie by casting a vote for Addison.
1978	(United States) (Rhode Island)	Rhode Island Senate	Senatorial District 29	4,110	Both Russell and Flynn had exactly 4,110 votes in the general election. On January 9, 1979, a special election was held where Flynn beat Russell 2,546–2,038.
1980	(United States) (New Hampshire)	New Hampshire Senate Republican primary	District 16	2,438	Incumbent Frank Wageman found himself in a tied election after a hospitalization left him unable to vote in the election. Two numbered balls were placed in a black leather bottle, and the first one to roll out was the winner. Wageman's ball came out first and challenger Eleanor P. Podles demanded a recount that did not change the outcome. Podles won a rematch in 1982.
1958	(United States) (Alaska)	Alaska Senate	District B	1,953	Republican candidate Boardman and Democrat "Bo" Smith both received 1,953 votes in Senate District B in Southeastern Alaska around Ketchikan. The Democratic-controlled Alaska Senate resolved the tie in favor of Smith.
1994	(United States) (Wyoming)	Wyoming House of Representatives	District 21	1,941	Republican Randall Luthi and independent candidate Larry Call each received 1,941 votes in a state House race in northern Lincoln County. On live TV (NBC's Today Show) Secretary of State Kathy Karpan drew a ping pong ball with Luthi's name out of Governor Sullivan's rumpled cowboy hat.
1826	(United States) (Pennsylvania)	United States House of Representatives	Pennsylvania's 2nd District	1,597	Adams Federalist John Sergeant and Jacksonian Henry Horn tied at 1,597, with a 3rd candidate getting 1,391 votes. The governor treated it as a vacancy, but did not call a new election until both Sergeant and Horn relinquished their claims. Sergeant defeated former Representative Joseph Hemphill in the special election a year later and was seated. Residents of the district contested the election, arguing that ballots were found that would have swung the regular election to Horn, but the House dismissed the contest because Horn had voluntarily relinquished his rights.
2006	(United States) (Alaska)	Alaska House of Representatives Democratic primary	District 37	1,534	After a recount, a state Supreme Court challenge and wrangling over five disputed ballots the race was decided by a coin toss, using a special coin with a walrus on one side and the seal of Alaska on the other. Bryce Edgmon, the winner of the coin toss, went on to be Speaker of the Alaska House of Representatives.
2004	(United States) (Montana)	Montana House of Representatives	District 12	1,559	The November 2, 2004 election resulted in the district 12 race being a 1,559–1,559 vote tie between Democratic candidate Jeanne Windham and Constitution candidate Rick Jore. On December 28, the Montana Supreme Court invalidated a small handful of ballots, which was enough to resolve the tie and give control of the state house to the Democratic Party.
1887	(Canada)	House of Commons of Canada	Joliette	1,532	Conservative Édouard Guilbault tied Liberal F. Neveu, but won the seat after the deciding vote was cast by the returning officer.
1896	(Canada)	House of Commons of Canada	Assiniboia West	1,502	Conservative Nicholas Flood Davin tied independent John K. McInnes. The deciding vote in Davin's favor was cast by the returning officer after the two candidates tied.
2015	(Canada)	Legislative Assembly of Prince Edward Island	Vernon River-Stratford	1,173	On Declaration Day, Mary Ellen McInnis and Alan McIsaac had 1,172–1,174 votes. McInnis filed a petition for a judicial recount. Provincial Court Judge John Douglas discovered that a vote for Ms. McInnis was mistakenly put in the pile for Mr. McIsaac. The result of the recount was thus that they were tied 1,173–1,173. Pursuant to section 102 of the Election Act, the toss of a coin was completed by the Returning Officer. The results of the coin toss were in favour of Alan McIsaac.
2025	(Uruguay) (Canelones Department)	Uruguayan municipal elections	San Bautista	857	Joaquín Farina (Colorado Party) tied with Roberto Siriani (National Party) in the race for mayor of the San Bautista Municipality in Canelones, Uruguay. Uruguayan law did not forestall how to break the tie and a second election could not be held as the election day is set by the Constitution. It was decided by the Uruguayan Electoral Court that the winner would be chosen by drawing a ballot from a ballot box containing only two closed envelopes. The event was broadcast on live TV, Joaquín Farina won the drawn and was proclaimed mayor.

=== List of close election results in single-winner, majoritarian and STV races ===
Year	Country region	Election	District/race	Margin		Total votes cast for winner	Description
Year	Country region	Election	District/race	(%)	(votes)	Total votes cast for winner	Description
2008	(India) (Rajasthan)	Rajasthan Legislative Assembly	Nathdwara	0.00076%	1	62,216	In the 2008 Rajasthan Legislative Assembly election, the result for the Nathdwara Assembly constituency became one of India's most significant electoral anomalies. Kalyan Singh Chauhan of the Bharatiya Janata Party (BJP) defeated incumbent four term representative C. P. Joshi of the Indian National Congress (INC) by a margin of exactly one vote as certified by the Election Commission of India in a major upset. At the time, C. P. Joshi was the President of the Rajasthan Pradesh Congress Committee and a leading candidate for the Chief Minister post. His single-vote defeat is widely credited with clearing the path for Ashok Gehlot to become Chief Minister instead. Joshi challenged the result in the Rajasthan High Court, alleging that Chouhan's wife, Kalpana Kunwar, had cast votes at two different polling stations (No. 39 and No. 40) under slightly different names. On August 31, 2012, while Joshi was serving as a Union Minister in Government of India, the High Court declared Chouhan's election void. The court found evidence of double voting and improper reception of certain votes, though Chouhan later challenged this in the Supreme Court. Following the High Court's 2012 order to void the election, a recount of specific disputed booths was conducted. This recount surprisingly resulted in a tie between Joshi and Chouhan. Upon discovering the tie, the Supreme Court asked Joshi to "rethink" the matter and decide whether he wanted to continue the legal pursuit, given that a tie would likely require a fresh election or a draw of lots—and the next regular assembly election was already approaching in 2013. Instead of pursuing a tie-breaker (which usually involves drawing lots), the parties moved toward the 2013 Assembly. Ultimately, the legal challenge did not result in a victory for Joshi. Reports indicate that after the recount ended in a tie, a draw was conducted, and Chouhan was declared the winner. Chouhan continued to serve his full term as the MLA for Nathdwara until the 2013 elections. In the following election, C. P. Joshi did not contest the Nathdwara seat himself; the Congress party fielded Devkinandan Gurjar, who lost to Chauhan by a much larger margin of 12,472 votes. Chauhan would die of cancer in 2018, months before the next elections, while still serving as an MLA. Joshi would go on to win the election from the seat in 2018, only to lose again in 2023.
2026	(India) (Tamil Nadu)	Tamil Nadu Legislative Assembly	Tiruppattur	0.000464%	1	83,375	In the 2026 Tamil Nadu Assembly election, 4-time incumbent MLA KR Periakaruppan of the Dravida Munnetra Kazhagam (DMK) was defeated by Seenivasa Sethupathy R of the newly-formed Tamilaga Vettri Kazhagam (TVK), by a single vote.
1974	(United States) (New Hampshire)	United States Senate	New Hampshire	0.000901%	2	110,926	On election day, Republican Louis Wyman won with a margin of just 355 votes out of more than 220,000. His opponent John A. Durkin then won the recount by 10 votes. After a second recount, Wyman won by just 2 votes. The Democratic-controlled Senate at first agreed to seat Wyman, who served the last 3 days of Norris Cotton's term, but began to deliberate again when the new Senate took office. When the Senate deadlocked for months, Durkin agreed to Wyman's proposal for a new election. The Senate declared the seat vacant and the governor appointed Cotton to hold the seat for six weeks until a special election on September 16. Durkin won the special by 27,000 votes.
1839	(United States) (Massachusetts)	Massachusetts gubernatorial	Governor of Massachusetts	0.00098%	1	51,034	Marcus Morton and the incumbent Whig Edward Everett received 51,034–50,725 votes respectively, with the remaining 307 votes went to scattering. The constitution of Massachusetts required a candidate to receive a majority of votes cast in order to win the office outright; otherwise, the legislature would have the authority to choose among the leading candidates. Morton exceeded this threshold by just 1 vote (50% of the 102,066 ballots cast), and had he not, the Whig controlled legislature would have been allowed to select the governor. The legislature could successfully deprive Morton of a majority if it disqualified the return from the town of Westfield. There was, moreover, an argument for doing so: the Westfield return was irregular and improper under the laws of the state because the attestation of its authenticity was not under seal. Instead, the return had been sealed first, and only afterward affixed with an attestation from the relevant local official. Despite pressure from partisans to contest this result, Everett refused. Historian and former Ohio Solicitor General Edward B. Foley notes: "In the annals of American history there is not an equivalent example of a candidate in a major statewide election willing to forgo a victory so tantalizingly within reach based on, first, such a narrow margin and, second, such a readily available legal argument for invalidating disputed ballots."
2020	(United States) (Iowa)	United States House of Representatives	Iowa's 2nd District	0.00152%	6	196,964	In the House election, Democrat Rita Hart lost by only six votes to Republican Mariannette Miller-Meeks. Unofficial results shortly after election day showed Miller-Meeks with a 282-vote lead. Official results, which included late-arriving absentee ballots and corrected canvassing errors, narrowed that lead to 44. A recount narrowed that vote still further to six votes. Hart chose not to appeal the election in the "contest court", arguing that Iowa law did not allow enough time, as from the November 30 certification date, the court would have had only eight days to organize and then carry out the recount. Instead she contested the election in the House of Representatives, asking for another recount, on the grounds that 22 votes were erroneously excluded due to poll worker error (and Iowa law had no way to remedy this) and that the recount was not done uniformly over the district. Miller-Meeks was provisionally sworn in and requested the House Committee on Administration dismiss the contest, but that request was denied. On March 31, after several Democratic House members publicly stated that they would not vote to change the result, Hart withdrew her contest. It was the 2nd closest House race in US history and the closest since 1824.
2025	(Canada)	Canadian federal	Terrebonne	0.00164%	1	23,352	Liberal candidate Tatiana Auguste defeated Bloc Québécois incumbent Nathalie Sinclair-Desgagné by one vote after a judicial recount.
1984	(United States) (Indiana)	United States House of Representatives	Indiana's 8th District	0.00171%	4	116,645	The initial count showed that Democrat Frank McCloskey had won by 72 votes, but Indiana's Republican Secretary of State refused to certify him pending a legal challenge by his Republican challenger Rick McIntyre. After a tabulation error was found a month later McIntyre took the lead by 34 votes and was certified by the Secretary, even though a recount was on-going. When the House opened it chose to seat neither person, but to pay them as though they were both members. The statewide recount was completed in late January and gave McIntyre a 418-vote lead, but against the Democratic-controlled House chose not to seat McIntyre, against the wishes of Republicans. The House conducted their own recount, in which they made several controversial decisions, and seated McCloskey after declaring him the winner by just four votes. Republicans, who sought to declare the election void and call for a special election, staged a procedural protest and a walk out to protest what they viewed as a stolen seat.
2013	(Australia)	Australian Senate	Western Australia	0.002125%	1	23,532	Before senate electoral reform in 2016, the Australian senate was elected by a series of complex preference deals. At one point the next party to be eliminated was between the Shooters and Fishers Party and the Australian Christians. The margin was effectively one vote at that point in the count, and depending on which party was ahead either the Labor Party and PUP or the Sports Party and the Greens would have been elected. As the recount was taking place it became apparent that there were some missing ballots, which was greater than the margin, so the election was voided and a re-run was conducted in 2014.
2023	(United States) (Louisiana)	Caddo Parish sheriff	Sheriff of Caddo Parish	0.002312%	1	21,624	In the runoff election, Henry Whitehorn, a Democrat, defeated Republican John Nickelson by one vote. After a court challenge, the election was rerun; Whitehorn won again with a larger margin.
1910	(United States) (New York (state))	United States House of Representatives	New York's 36th District	0.00242%	1	20,685	Charles Bennett Smith, a Democrat, defeated the incumbent, Representative De Alva S. Alexander, a Republican, by one vote, 20,685 to 20,684.
2025	(Germany)	German federal	Stuttgart I	0.00310%	5	45,668	Grüne's Simone Fischer defeated CDU's Elisabeth Schick-Ebert by 5 votes. The original count saw Fischer win with 16 votes.
1988	(United States) (Massachusetts)	Massachusetts Governor's Council Democratic primary	3rd District	0.00340%	1	14,716	Herbert L. Connolly lost to Robert B. Kennedy by one vote, and it was his own. Connolly arrived at his precinct a few minutes after the polls closed and was not able to vote. Kennedy won the following general.
2003	(Russia) (Sverdlovsk Oblast)	Russian legislative	Sverdlovsk Oblast District 163	0.00342%	5	73,083	Incumbent Georgy Leontyev held the seat by five votes, despite allegations of vote manipulation, later rejected by the Supreme Court.
1919	(Australia)	Australian House of Representatives	Ballarat	0.00369%	1	13,569	Edwin Kerby defeated incumbent MP Charles McGrath by a single vote. The result was voided by the Court of Disputed Returns, which criticised the "almost incredible carelessness" of the electoral officers. McGrath won the subsequent by-election.
1997	(United Kingdom)	United Kingdom general	Winchester	0.00383%	2	26,100	In the General Election, Mark Oaten led Gerry Malone by 2 votes (26,100–26,098). A total of 55 ballot papers were excluded from the count for want of official mark, of which 18 were votes in favor of Oaten and 22 in favor of Malone. Therefore, Malone would have had a majority of 2 votes had they been included in the count. On hearing an Election Petition in the High Court on 6 October 1997 Lord Justice Brooke and Mr. Justice Gage ordered that there should be a fresh election. The petition also stated that four voters cast tendered ballots after claiming to have been impersonated, but the impersonators could not be found and the allegation was not pursued. In the subsequent by-election, Oaten easily beat Malone (37,006–15,450).
1992	(Philippines)	Philippine Senate	At-large	0.00398%	966	3,964,966	The Philippine Senate is elected via multiple non-transferable vote. The 24th placed candidate, Butz Aquino of LDP, edged out Alfredo Bengzon of Lakas to win out the last Senate seat.
2022	(United States) (Massachusetts)	Massachusetts House of Representatives	2nd Essex	0.00425%	1	11,763	Kristin Kassner (D) defeated incumbent Leonard Mirra (R).
1882	(United States) (Virginia)	United States House of Representatives	Virginia's 1st District	0.00476%	1	10,505	The initial tally had incumbent Democrat George T. Garrison up 70 votes on Readjuster challenger Robert M. Mayo. The Readjuster-controlled State Board of Canvassers then threw out the votes of Gloucester County and Hog Island precinct (Garrison had received all 14 votes from Hog Island). The new totals then had Mayo up one: 10,505–10,504. (A third candidate, the Republican John W. Woltz, received 168 votes). Mayo was seated and served for a little over a year, but Garrison contested the result. The Committee of Elections then chose to accept the Gloucester County and Hog Island ballots and the House voted unanimously to seat Garrison.
1868	(United States) (North Carolina)	United States House of Representatives	North Carolina's 7th District	0.004841%	1	10,329	Plato Durham (D) was initially declared elected over Alexander H. Jones (R) with an 18-vote majority: 10,347–10,329. When Republicans began to complain of fraud, the votes were sent to General Canby at Charleston, who threw out enough for Jones to defeat Durham. Jones was then elected by 1 vote, 10,329–10,328.
2004	(United States) (Washington (state))	Washington gubernatorial	Governor of Washington	0.004842%	133	1,373,361	Democrat Christine Gregoire defeated Republican Dino Rossi, following two recounts, after the initial count and first recount showed Rossi as the winner.
2024	(India)	Lok Sabha	Mumbai North West	0.00503%	48	452,644	Ravindra Waikar (Shiv Sena) won with a 48-vote-lead against Amol Gajanan Kirtikar (Shiv Sena (UBT)).
2024	(Hungary) (Budapest)	Budapest local	Mayor of Budapest	0.00524%	41	371,578	The candidate of the centre-left opposition candidate Gergely Karácsony defeated LMP candidate Dávid Vitézy who was backed by the Fidesz–KDNP alliance by 324 votes (0.0415%). Vitézy demanded a recount, asserting that a large portion of the ballots had been wrongfully deemed invalid. After recounting these ballots, the Hungarian National Election Office declared Karácsony the winner by a margin of 41 votes.
1931	(United Kingdom)	United Kingdom general	Ilkeston	0.00569%	2	17,587	A.J. Flint (National Labour) gained the seat from George Oliver (Labour). After the polls closed it became clear that the Ilkeston election was very close. There were four recounts overnight, and the Returning Officer decided to call a halt in the early hours to return later in the day. At the end of the fifth recount, the Returning Officer declared Flint elected by a majority of two votes over the sitting Labour MP. This result remains the joint smallest majority in any individual constituency election since universal suffrage.
2002	(Republic of Ireland)	Irish general	Limerick West	0.00584%	1	8,564	Going into the fourth (and final) count, sitting Fine Gael TD Dan Neville trailed his party colleague Michael Finucane, also an outgoing TD, 7,862 to 7,867 in the race for the third and final seat. He picked up 702 votes transferred from the eliminated candidates, six more than his opponent, to win by one vote. Finucane requested a recount, but when it became clear that the margin of his defeat would only increase, he requested the returning officer to terminate the recount, thus leaving the official margin of defeat at one vote. "I am happy enough with the findings and I accept it. Democracy has spoken and I am sure there are many people out there feeling sorry at this stage that they didn't vote for me to tip me over the line."
1854	(United States) (Illinois)	United States House of Representatives	Illinois' 7th District	0.00592%	1	8,452	On the initial tally, incumbent Democrat James C. Allen was ahead of challenger Republican William B. Archer by one vote: 8452–8451. Archer contested. Livingston precinct had initially certified Allen and Archer's votes as 47–100 (in that precinct). But they later certified that they had made a mistake and the vote (in that precinct) should instead have been 46–102. In which case the overall vote should have been 8,451–8,453. The Committee of Elections concluded that Allen had won by at least 1 and probably 2 votes and recommended that he be seated. However, the House voted 94–90 that Allen was not qualified and also voted 91–89 that Archer would not be seated either. The seat was thus vacated. A special election in 1856 was a rematch between Allen and Archer, and Allen soundly defeated Archer 13,081–10,136.
2022	(United States) (Alabama)	Alabama State Senate Republican primary	District 27	0.00597%	1	8,373	Jay Hovey defeated incumbent Tom Whatley.
2000	(South Korea)	South Korean legislature	Gwangju	0.00614%	3	16,675	GNP Park Hyuk-kyu defeated MDP Moon Hak-jin by an official tally of a three-vote difference.
1966	(United Kingdom)	United Kingdom general	Peterborough	0.00626%	3	23,944	Conservative Party incumbent Sir Harmar Nicholls defeated Labour Party challenger Michael Ward 23,944–23,941. Ward would again challenge and lose in 1970 and Feb 1974, but would win in Oct 1974.
1847	(United States) (Indiana)	United States House of Representatives	Indiana's 6th District	0.0067%	1	7,455	Whig George G. Dunn defeated Democrat David M. Dobson 7,455–7,454.
2024	(Colorado)	Colorado House of Representatives	House District 16	0.00727%	3	41,279	Republican Rebecca Keltie defeated incumbent Democrat Stephanie Vigil by just 3 votes. The initial count had Keltie win by 6, and a one-point during the recount the two were tied but 3 votes were determined to have been erroneously counted for Vigil and they were removed. The race carried extra importance as the seat cost Democrats their supermajority in the House.
2017	(United Kingdom)	United Kingdom general	North East Fife	0.00728%	2	13,743	Stephen Gethins of the Scottish National Party saw off a challenge by Elizabeth Riches of the Liberal Democrats to retain the seat of former leader Menzies Campbell.
1962	(United States) (Minnesota)	Minnesota gubernatorial	Governor of Minnesota	0.00734%	91	619,842	The vote count after election day had Governor Elmer L. Andersen in the lead by 142 votes. Then-Lieutenant Governor Karl Rolvaag went to court and won the right for a recount. After the recount, it was determined that Rolvaag of the DFL had defeated Andersen, Republican, by 91 votes out of over 1.2 million cast. Rolvaag collected 619,842 votes to Andersen's 619,751.
2020	(United States) (North Carolina)	North Carolina Judicial	Chief Justice of the North Carolina Supreme Court	0.00744%	401	2,695,951	Following a count, recount and hand-to-eye recount in 1% of precincts, Incumbent Chief Justice Cheri Beasley was defeated by Justice Paul Newby. The result meant that Republicans won all 8 statewide judicial races in the 2020 general election.
1916	(United States) (Iowa)	United States House of Representatives	Iowa's 11th District	0.00768%	4	26,033	In the initial vote count, the sitting member Republican George C. Scott won by a majority of 131 votes, which Thomas J. Steele contested, alleging failure to count votes cast for the contestant and illegal counting of votes for the contestee. After a series of recounts, during which the lead switched back and forth and the contest was even tied at one point, the tally changed to 26,033–26,029 and after some legal wrangling (about lost ballots and votes by Iowa National Guardsmen serving at the Texas border), Scott was declared elected by the Democrat-controlled House.
1991	(United States) (Virginia)	Virginia House of Delegates	District 53	0.00770%	1	6,493	After a recount, Jim Scott won by a single vote, earning him the nickname "Landslide Jim".
2018	(United States) (Kentucky)	Kentucky House of Representatives	13th Representative District	0.0079%	1	6,319	In the initial count, Democrat Jim Glenn defeated Republican incumbent DJ Johnson by 1 vote, which was confirmed by a recanvass. Johnson filed for a recount, and Glenn was seated on January 8, 2019. The House later ordered another recount which was carried out over the weekend of January 30. Following that recount, Glenn emerged as the winner by 3 votes, but then the County Board of Electors voted to reinstate one of the votes taken from Johnson earlier in the day and later to count five of 17 rejected absentee ballot. The result was a 6,323–6,323 tie. On February 8, 2019, when Glenn threatened to sue if a coin toss were held and he lost, Johnson withdrew his challenge, thus settling the election.
2022	(United States) (New York (state))	New York State Senate	District 50	0.00812%	10	61,579	Incumbent Democrat John Mannion defeated Republican Rebecca Shiroff.
2014	(United States) (North Carolina)	North Carolina District Court	District 5	0.00813%	5	30,746	Lindsey McKee Luther defeated Kent Harrell for North Carolina District Court, District 5 by five votes: 30,746–30,741.
1974	(United Kingdom)	United Kingdom general	Carmarthen	0.00851%	3	17,165	Labour Party incumbent Gwynoro Jones defeated Plaid Cymru candidate Gwynfor Evans 17,165–17,162. Jones had also beaten Evans in 1970, but would lose to Evans in Oct 1974.
2002	(United States) (Washington (state))	Washington House of Representatives Republican primary	26th Legislative District	0.00852%	1	5,870	Ed Mitchell defeated Kevin Entze by one vote: 5,870–5,869. Adding insult to injury, one of Entze's friends admitted that they never got their ballot mailed. "He left his ballot on his kitchen counter and it never got sent out," Entze said. Mitchell went on to narrowly lose the general election.
1912	(United States) (Kansas)	Kansas gubernatorial	Governor of Kansas	0.00866%	29	167,437	George H. Hodges defeated the popular Republican Arthur Capper by a razor-thin margin of 29 votes out of 359,684 cast.
1948	(United States) (Texas)	United States Senate Democratic primary runoff	Texas	0.00880%	87	494,191	Lyndon B. Johnson was declared the winner over Coke R. Stevenson despite suspicion about 202 votes reported six days after the election from Precinct 13 of Jim Wells County.
1996	(United States) (Vermont)	Vermont Senate	Rutland County	0.00911%	2	10,978	There were six candidates for the three Rutland County Senate seats. On the night of the election, John H. Bloomer, Jr. and Cheryl M. Hooker received the first and second highest vote totals. Hull Maynard received the third highest total with 10,952 votes and Thomas Macaulay received the fourth highest total with 10,934 votes. Macaulay petitioned for a recount, whereupon the Rutland Superior Court determined that Maynard still beat Macaulay by two votes: 10,978–10,976. Macaulay's petition for further relief was dismissed by the Senate.
2000	(United States) (Florida)	United States presidential	Florida	0.00921%	537	2,912,790	Republican George W. Bush was ahead of Democrat Al Gore after the initial count by 1,784 votes. After a mandatory statewide recount his lead was cut to 327. After military and overseas ballots were added in, his lead increased to 930. An additional hand recount was halted by the United States Supreme Court which resulted in the certified margin. Florida was the tipping point state for Bush's presidential victory.
2001	(Italy)	Italian Senate	Marino	0.00929%	14	62,330	Olive Tree candidate Severino Lavagnini was elected, but the defeated House of Freedoms candidate won a seat via levelling seats.
1982	(United States) (New Hampshire)	New Hampshire Senate	District 8	0.00934%	1	5,352	Incumbent Republican George Wiggins defeated Democrat Fred Belair by 1 vote.
2010	(United Kingdom)	United Kingdom general	Fermanagh and South Tyrone	0.00939%	4	21,304	Michelle Gildernew (Sinn Féin) defeated Independent Unionist Rodney Connor by 4 votes. Connor had the support of the Democratic Unionist Party and the Ulster Unionist Party, the two main unionist parties in Northern Ireland. Connor lodged an election petition against Gildernew alleging irregularities in the counting of the votes, but the High Court found that there were only three ballot papers which could not be accounted for, and even if they were all votes for Connor, Gildernew would have had a plurality of one. The election was therefore upheld.
2022	(United States) (Connecticut)	Connecticut House of Representatives	District 81	0.00944%	1	10,593	Democrat Chris Poulos defeated Republican Tony Morrison by 1 vote.
2022	(United States) (California)	California State Senate	District 16	0.009495%	13	68,461	Democratic incumbent Melissa Hurtado defeated Republican David Shepard by 13 votes.
1970	(United States) (Missouri)	Missouri House of Representatives	District 116	0.01037%	1	4,819	Both the initial count and a recount showed that incumbent Gus Salley (R-Warsaw) had defeated Morran D. Harris (D-Osceola), though a clerical error cost Salley 100 votes, indicating the real result was not nearly as close. Harris brought the case to the House Election Committee to decide, but they chose not to overturn the results.
1832	(United States) (Maryland)	United States presidential	Maryland	0.01044%	4	19,160	National Republican Henry Clay carried Maryland by four votes over Democratic President Andrew Jackson, but this is trivial since all of the electors were chosen based on the outcome in four districts. Had Jackson won the statewide vote, it would not have changed the electoral college vote.
1910	(United Kingdom)	United Kingdom general	Exeter	0.0105%	1	4,777	Henry Duke (Conservative), the incumbent at the time of the general election, re-gained the seat from Harold St Maur (Liberal) on an election petition in 1911. The court changed the original result (under which the Liberal had won by four votes). The revised result was the smallest numerical majority in a UK Parliamentary election in the twentieth century.
2015	(United States) (Mississippi)	Mississippi House of Representatives	District 79	0.0109%	1	4,585	After Democratic incumbent Blaine Eaton tied Republican Mark Tullos with 4,589 votes each, he won re-election by drawing the long straw. However, Tullos asked the State House to review the results, which they did, resulting in them throwing out five affidavit ballots for Eaton. The ballots were cast by people who had moved within 30 days prior to the election and had not updated their address. The vote that seated Tullos was largely a party-line vote and gave Republicans a super-majority. Which five ballots were invalidated was never publicly stated, but they were all for Eaton and so the committee stopped evaluation the votes, because even if the other four were for Tullos and also invalid, Tullos would still win by one vote. The final official count is unknown, and the count here is based on that decision.
2022	(United States) (Arizona)	Arizona general	Arizona Attorney General	0.01116%	280	1,254,809	Democrat Kris Mayes originally defeated Republican Abraham Hamadeh by 511 votes, but after a recount, her lead narrowed to 280 votes.
2001	(Cape Verde)	Cape Verdean presidential	President of Cape Verde	0.0112%	17	75,828	Pedro Pires (African Party for the Independence of Cape Verde) defeated Carlos Veiga (Movement for Democracy) in the second round of the election after neither won more than 50% in the first round.
1924	(United Kingdom)	United Kingdom general	Leeds, West	0.0114%	3	13,057	Labour Party candidate Thomas Stamford defeated Conservative Party candidate A.F.G. Renton 13,057–13,054. This was the lowest margin of victory in a Leeds parliamentary election.
1908	(United States) (Massachusetts)	United States House of Representatives	Massachusetts's 10th District	0.0121%	4	16,533	Representative Joseph F. O'Connell, a Democrat, defeated J. Mitchel Galvin, a Republican, by four votes, 16,553 to 16,549. The record does not disclose the official returns, but a recount before a bipartisan board under the laws of Massachusetts gave O'Connell 16,553 votes, Galvin 16,549 votes, and two other candidates 1,380 and 1,187 votes, respectively, a plurality of 4 votes for Galvin, the sitting Member.
1923	(United Kingdom)	United Kingdom general	Devon, Tiverton	0.0122%	3	12,303	Liberal Party incumbent Francis Dyke Acland defeated Conservative Party candidate Gilbert John Acland-Troyte 12,303–12,300. Acland had also defeated Acland-Troyte in the by-election earlier that same year, but Acland-Troyte would defeat Acland in 1924.
1972	(Canada) (Ontario)	Canadian federal	Ontario	0.0123%	4	16,328	Liberal incumbent Norman Cafik defeated Progressive Conservative Frank Charles McGee. A PC win in this district would have resulted in a 108–108 tie with the Liberals in the overall seat count.
2022	(Bosnia and Herzegovina) (Republika Srpska)	Republika Srpska presidential election	Bosniak Vice-President	0.01254%	80	13,760	The vice-presidents are elected alongside President of Republika Srpska. Independent candidate Ćamil Duraković defeated Senad Bratić endorsed by SDP, SDA, and their allies.
2006	(Hungary)	Hungarian general election	District 8 of Borsod-Abaúj-Zemplén county	0.01263%	3	11,871	Socialist candidate Nándor Gúr defeated incumbent, conservative, Fidesz-candidate Oszkár Molnár by 9 votes. At Molnár's request, the Court decided to recount the votes and Gúr finally won by three votes.
2018	(Italy)	Italian Chamber of Deputies	Guidonia Montecelio	0.01269%	19	55,360	M5S candidate Sebastiano Cubeddu defeated CDX candidate Barbara Saltamartini.
2008	(United States) (Minnesota)	United States Senate	Minnesota	0.01287%	312	1,212,629	After the first count, Norm Coleman edged out Al Franken by 215 votes, but following a state mandated recount, Al Franken defeated Norm Coleman by 225. Coleman contested the recount, after which Franken's lead grew to 312. After the Minnesota Supreme Court unanimously rejected Coleman's appeals, he conceded the race to Franken on June 30, 2009, 238 days after the election.
1929	(United Kingdom)	United Kingdom general	Cheshire, Northwich	0.01292%	4	15,477	In this three-way race, Conservative Party incumbent Lord Colum Crichton-Stuart defeated Labour Party candidate Mrs Barbara Ayrton-Gould 15,477–15,473. Crichton-Stuart also defeated Mrs Gould in 1924 and 1931.
2024	(United States) (North Carolina)	North Carolina Supreme Court	Justice of the North Carolina Supreme Court	0.0132%	734	5,540,090	Following a count, recount and hand-to-eye recount in 1% of precincts, Incumbent Justice Allison Riggs defeated Court of Appeals judge Jefferson Griffin. Griffin filed hundreds of legal challenges to the vote, claiming that nearly 60,000 people voted illegally and on January 7, 2025, the Republican-controlled state Supreme Court blocked the certification of the election until Griffin's case could be heard by the court. The case worked its way through the state courts and then the federal courts until on May 5, 2025, Chief District Judge Richard E. Myers II ordered the North Carolina Board of Elections to certify the results and that the ballots challenged by Griffin should be counted. Griffin then conceded the election to Riggs on May 7, 2025.
1994	(United States) (Connecticut)	United States House of Representatives	Connecticut's 2nd district	0.0133%	21	79,188	In this three-way race between Democrat Sam Gejdenson, Republican Edward Munster, and Connecticut Party candidate David Bingham, the initial official tally was 79,169–79,167–27,729 (186,065 total votes). Following a recount, Gejdenson and Munster were 79,160–79,156 with 186,030 total votes cast. The Connecticut Supreme Court ruled instead that the correct final tally was 79,188–79,167, awarding the seat to Gejdenson. (However the Court did not mention what the correct total number of votes cast was.) Munster originally contested the election in the Republican-controlled House, but withdrew his contest citing the expense and time it would take.
1964	(Malaysia) (Selangor)	Selangor State Legislative Assembly	Kepong	0.0134%	2	7,487	Tan Chee Khoon, president of the Labour Party of Selangor, defeated the incumbent Chan Keong Hon of the Malaysian Chinese Association by two votes. At the time Chan was a member of the state executive council.
2016	(United States) (Vermont)	Vermont Senate Democratic primary	Washington County District	0.0135%	1	3,709	Superior Court Judge Timothy Tomasi determined that Francis K. Brooks defeated fourth-place finisher Ashley Hill by one vote in the Democratic primary for the three-member at-large Washington County district, 3,709 to 3,708. The victory hinged on a disputed ballot from Worcester that Tomasi determined contained a vote for Brooks, but not one for Hill. Brooks went on to finish third in the general election that fall, unseating longtime incumbent Republican Bill Doyle by 191 votes.
1968	(Australia) (South Australia)	South Australian House of Assembly	Seat of Millicent	0.0138%	1	3,635	On 2 March 1968, Martin Cameron contested the seat of Millicent for the House of Assembly, standing against the sitting member, and minister in the Labor Cabinet, Des Corcoran. Narrowly losing the seat by one vote (3635–3634), the Liberal and Country League challenged the decision and the election was referred to the South Australian Court of Disputed Returns. The court ordered a by-election, which was held on 22 June. This was won comfortably by Corcoran (3994–3564), the Dunstan-led Australian Labor Party running the campaign on electoral reform.
2026	(Japan)	Japanese general	Hokkaido 10th district	0.014%	21	74,908	Centrist Reform Alliance incumbent Hiroshi Kamiya defeated Liberal Democratic Party Candinate Koichi Watanabe by 21 votes (0.014%)
1930	(Canada)	Canadian federal	Yamaska	0.0143%	1	3,505	Liberal incumbent Aimé Boucher defeated Conservative Paul-François Comtois. The riding result was later declared void, and Boucher won the by-election in 1933 by 84 votes (0.1%).
1939	(Australia)	Australian House of Representatives	Griffith	0.0144%	8	27,790	Labor candidate William Conelan defeated United Australia Party candidate Peter McCowan, following the death of the Labor incumbent Frank Baker.
1968	(Canada)	Canadian federal	Leeds	0.01478%	4	13,536	Progressive Conservative Desmond Code defeated Liberal incumbent John Matheson.
1945	(United Kingdom)	United Kingdom general	Worcester	0.01479%	4	13,523	In this three-way race, Conservative Party candidate George Ward defeated Labour Party/Co-operative Party candidate J. Evans 13,523–13,519.
2020	(Australia) (Queensland)	Queensland Legislative Assembly	Bundaberg	0.0148%	9	30,287	Australian Labor Party candidate Tom Smith won the seat, unseating Liberal National Party MP David Batt, by just 9 votes, after distribution of minor candidate preferences. The margin had been initially reported as 11 votes, but was reduced to 9 votes after a formal recount.
1946	(Philippines)	Philippine Senate	At-large	0.0149%	384	557,156	The Philippine Senate is elected via multiple non-transferable vote. The 8th placed candidate, Salipada Pendatun of the Liberal Party, edged out partymate Prospero Sanidad to win out the last Senate seat. Sanidad later won an election protest to enter the Senate.
1949	(Canada)	Canadian federal	Annapolis—Kings	0.0152%	4	13,202	Liberal Angus Alexander Elderkin defeated Progressive Conservative incumbent George Nowlan.
2020	(United States) (Florida)	Florida State Senate	District 37	0.01529%	32	104,630	After the initial tally, challenger Ileana Garcia led incumbent Jose Javier Rodriguez by 21 votes. An automatic hand recount extended that lead to 32 votes. The race was marred by fraud as a 3rd party candidate, also with the last name Rodriquez, received more than 6000 votes after being funded by a mysterious donor who funded an ad campaign that seemed designed to confuse voters. A few months after the election the candidate, Alex Rodríguez, pleaded guilty to accepting illegal campaign donations and lying on campaign documents and agreed to testify against former Sen. Frank Artiles who had been charged with felony campaign fraud charges in March 2021.
1968	(United States) (Wisconsin)	Wisconsin House of Representatives	District 25	0.01533%	2	6,523	Official count showed a margin of 3 vote for Joseph L. Looby (D) over Wilmer R. Waters (R), but it was 1 after a recount. A case was filed with the circuit court, where the judge declared the margin was two votes. An election committee investigated, but could make no proclamation of the true margin. After Waters appealed to the Republican controlled assembly, it voted unanimously to seat Looby.
2018	(United States) (Pennsylvania)	Pennsylvania House of Representatives Republican primary	District 193	0.015366%	1	1,784	Republican Torren Ecker defeated three others.
2002	(United States) (Connecticut)	Connecticut House of Representatives	District 65	0.0155%	1	3,236	Republican Anne Ruwet defeated Democrat John S. Kovaleski by one vote (3,236–3,235).
1922	(United States) (New York (state))	United States House of Representatives	New York's 21st District	0.0156%	10	32,089	Sitting Member Royal H. Weller had been returned by an official plurality of 245 votes, which the contestant Martin C. Ansorge contested. Following a recount, the tally was 32,089–32,079 and Weller was declared elected.
1964	(United Kingdom)	United Kingdom general	Brighton Kemptown	0.0157%	7	22,308	Labour Party challenger Dennis Hobden defeated incumbent Conservative Party David James 22,308–22,301.
2022	(United States) (North Carolina)	2022 North Carolina state legislature Republican primary	North Carolina House of Representatives District 115	0.0159%	1	3,146	After a hand-eye recount that added one vote to his total, Pratik Bhakta defeated Sherry M. Higgins.
1870	(United States) (Indiana)	United States House of Representatives	Indiana's 4th District	0.0159%	4	12,561	Republican Jeremiah M. Wilson defeated Democrat David S. Gooding by 4 votes: 12561–12557. Gooding contested. The Committee's majority report gave Wilson a "clear legal majority of 8", while the minority report gave Gooding a majority of 17. The US House then voted 105–64 (71 abstentions) "on strictly party lines" to reject the minority report, accept the majority report, and thereby seat Wilson.
1950	(United States) (Maryland)	Maryland Senate	Garrett County	0.0162%	1	3,080	Republican incumbent Neil C. Fraley defeated Democratic challenger Bernard I. Gonder by one vote: 3,080–3,079. Gonder contested the result but to no avail.
1983	(United Kingdom)	United Kingdom general	Leicester South	0.0163%	7	21,424	Conservative Party challenger Derek Spencer defeated Labour Party incumbent Jim Marshall 21,424–21,417.
2004	(Malaysia) (Kelantan)	Kelantan State Legislative Assembly	Kemuning	0.01646%	2	6,078	The Kemuning state constituency was shifted east in the 2004 redelineation, absorbing most of the abolished Banggol Judah constituency. Incumbent Banggol Judah assemblyman Zakaria Yaacob retained the seat for PAS by two votes against UMNO candidate Wan Mohamad Zin Mat Amin, 6,078–6,076. Crucially, this allowed PAS to maintain control of the Kelantan assembly throughout the term as it won 24 seats to UMNO's 22, and UMNO subsequently cut PAS' margin to one seat by winning the 2005 Pengkalan Pasir by-election.
1988	(Canada)	Canadian federal	London—Middlesex	0.0165%	8	18,534	Progressive Conservative MP Terry Clifford narrowly edged out Liberal Garnet Bloomfield.
1959	(Japan)	Japanese House of Councillors	Tottori at-large	0.016529%	39	117,991	JSP's incumbent Yoshio Nakata defeated LDP's challenger Masao Miyazaki by 39 votes.
2005	(United States) (Virginia)	Virginia General	Virginia Attorney General	0.01663%	323	970,886	Bob McDonnell was certified as the victor over Creigh Deeds following a recount.
1988	(United States) (Massachusetts)	Massachusetts Governor's Council Democratic primary	3rd District	0.0170%	5	14,709	In the recount, Robert B. Kennedy led Herbert Connolly by one vote: 14,716–14,715. (Connolly had actually failed to vote for himself.) In the recount, Kennedy again led by one vote: 14,691–14,690. Connolly contested the result. The Supreme Judicial Court considered 116 contested votes and decided ultimately that Kennedy won by five votes: 14,709–14,704.
2022	(Bosnia and Herzegovina) (Republika Srpska)	Republika Srpska presidential election	Croat Vice-President	0.0176%	112	1,966	The vice-presidents are elected alongside President of Republika Srpska. Independent candidate Ćamil Duraković was defeated by Ivan Begić endorsed by HDZ and its allies.
1829	(United States) (Kentucky)	United States House of Representatives	Kentucky's 2nd District	0.0179%	1	5,591	Jacksonsian candidate Nicholas D. Coleman defeated Adams candidate Adam Beatty 2520–2519.
2018	(Pakistan)	Pakistani general	Mardan-II	0.0181%	35	78,911	Awami National Party's Ameer Haider Hoti defeated Pakistan Tehreek-e-Insaf's Atif Khan 78,911-78,876.
2025	(United Kingdom)	United Kingdom by-election	Runcorn and Helsby	0.0184%	6	12,645	Reform UK's Sarah Pochin defeated Labour's Karen Shore by 6 votes. Original count saw a lead of 4 votes.
2021	(Germany)	German federal	Dresden II – Bautzen II	0.0186%	35	35,014	CDU's Lars Rohwer defeated AfD's Andreas Harlaß by 35 votes.
2011	(Canada)	Canadian federal	Montmagny—L'Islet—Kamouraska—Rivière-du-Loup	0.0189%	9	17,285	Conservative incumbent Bernard Généreux was initially declared the winner by 311 votes. Subsequently, the returning officer determined that approximately 300 votes for the New Democratic candidate, François Lapointe, had been allocated to the Green Party candidate in error. After the correction, Lapointe was declared elected by 5 votes, prompting an automatic judicial recount. As a result of this recount, Lapointe was confirmed as the victor over Généreux by 9 votes, 17,285-17,276.
1936	(United States) (New Hampshire)	United States House of Representatives	New Hampshire's 1st District	0.0193%	20	51,702	After the initial count, Republican Arthur B. Jenks was declared the winner by 550 votes, however a recount left the vote tied at 51,690 votes each. Both parties contested ballots, 108 in total, to the state ballot-law commission which after ruling on each determined that Alphonse Roy had won 51,695-51,678. After those hearings were over, Jenks argued that there was a 36-ballot discrepancy between those cast and those counted in Newton. The ballot-law commission called for another recount, finding the count was now 51,702 to 51,678, but also that 34 ballots were missing and that they should be awarded to Jenks making him the winner by 10 votes. Roy contested, and though Jenks was not sworn in until two days after Congress met, he did take office. During Roy's contest the majority of the Committee on Elections found that though there was a discrepancy between the ballots and the tally sheet, there was no evidence that any ballots had disappeared due to fraud or mistake and that in such a conflict the ballots should be considered the best evidence of the votes cast; and they found that four additional ballots should be awarded to Jenks raising his total to 51,682. The minority of the committee argued that they could establish both by testimony and the tally sheets that more people had voted in Newton than there were ballots to count; that in every race in Newton Republicans had lost 34 votes in the recount and Democrats had lost zero; and that the number of ballots (used and unused) returned to the state was 34 lower than what was sent. In the end the Democrat-controlled House decided to accept the majority's position, and on June 9, 1938, Jenks was removed from office and Roy was seated. Jenks then won election five months later and served until 1943.
2003	(Somaliland)	Somaliland presidential	President of Somaliland	0.0195%	80	205,595	Dahir Riyale Kahin, of the For Unity, Democracy, and Independence party narrowly defeated the Peace, Unity, and Development Party's Ahmed M. Mahamoud Silanyo in a three-way race.
1974	(United Kingdom)	United Kingdom general	Bodmin	0.0196%	9	20,283	Liberal challenger Paul Tyler defeated Conservative Party incumbent Robert Hicks 20,283–20,274.
2001	(Italy)	Italian Senate	Rome Centre	0.0196%	29	68,773	House of Freedoms candidate Giulio Maceratini was elected but the defeated The Olive Tree Tana De Zulueta candidate won a seat via levelling seats.
2006	(United States) (Oklahoma)	Oklahoma House of Representatives	District 25	0.0208%	2	4,798	Initially Democrat Darrel Nemecek beat Republican Todd Thomsen by two votes for the Oklahoma House of Representatives seat in its 25th district. But during the recount, a Hughes County judge threw out four votes for Nemecek when it was discovered the voters who cast the contested ballots were not registered to vote in the district. Though Nemecek argued that the straight-party option was confusing and voter intent was clear on some ballots that were not counted for him, Thomsen was declared the winner and sworn in.
2024	(Maine)	Maine House of Representatives	House District 141	0.02018%	1	2,478	Republican incumbent Lucas Lanigan defeated Democratic challenger Patricia Kidder.
2006	(Netherlands)	1897 Dutch general election	Sneek	0.0204%	1	2,452	Jan Albert van Gilse defeated Theo Heemskerk in the Sneek district run-off by 1 vote.
2004	(United States) (Virginia)	Commonwealth's Attorney Special Election	Radford District	0.0211%	1	2,375	Chris E. Rehak defeated Patrick Moore by 1 vote, and a recount did not change the margin.
1820	(United States) (Maryland)	United States House of Representatives	Maryland's 6th District	0.02136%	1	2,341	The race for Maryland's 6th District House Seat was originally declared a tie, and so the Governor and Council of Maryland – in what they thought was accordance of the law – decided to seat Jeremiah Cosden. Philip Reed, who like Cosden was a Democratic-Republican, contested the election. The House decided that the Governor and Council were not allowed to choose a winner; that two votes for Reed that were excluded ought to count and that one that was counted for him was illegal. As a result, Cosden, who had been seated for 15 days, was removed and Reed was seated for the remainder of the term.
2021	(United States) (Florida)	United States House of Representatives Democratic primary	Florida's 20th District	0.02144%	5	11,662	In the Democratic primary for the chance to replace Alcee Hastings who had died in April, healthcare executive Sheila Cherfilus-McCormick defeated Broward County Commissioner Dale Holness by just five votes. The election day results had Cherfilus-McCormick ahead by 12 votes, but a recount narrowed that lead to five.
1896	(Canada)	Canadian federal	Ontario North	0.0215%	1	2,328	Liberal-Conservative John Alexander McGillivray defeated Patrons of Industry Duncan Graham.
2022	(United States) (New York (state))	New York State Assembly	New York's 99th State Assembly district	0.021575%	8	18,539	Democrat Chris Eachus defeated Republican Kathryn Luciani by eight votes following a hand recount.
2020	(Saint Vincent and the Grenadines)	Vincentian general	North Leeward	0.0218%	1	2,271	Unity Labour candidate Carlos James defeated New Democratic candidate Roland "Patel" Matthews by 1 vote.
1900	(Canada)	Canadian federal	Selkirk	0.0230%	1	2,172	Liberal William Forsythe McCreary defeated Conservative John Herber Haslam. This was the second time in a row that a Liberal candidate defeated his Conservative rival in this riding by a single vote.
2024	(United States) (Colorado)	Colorado House of Representatives Republican primary	District 58	0.0231%	3	6,489	Larry Don Suckla defeated J. Mark Roeber.
2025	(Australia)	Australian House of Representatives	Bradfield	0.0232%	26	56,114	The original count saw Liberal candidate Gisele Kapterian win against Teal independent Nicolette Boele 56,191 to 56,183 votes but the recount reduced the lead to 2 votes with 56,154 to 56,152 votes. Then Boele took the lead with 28 votes. The final results saw Boele ahead with 26 votes.
1904	(United States) (Maryland)	United States presidential	Maryland	0.0233%	51	109,497	Republican President Theodore Roosevelt barely carried Maryland over Democrat Alton Parker on his way to an electoral landslide.
1970	(United Kingdom)	United Kingdom general	Ipswich	0.0234%	13	27,704	Conservative Party challenger Ernle Money defeated Labour Party incumbent Dingle Foot 27,704–27,691.
1959	(United Kingdom)	United Kingdom general	South East Derbyshire	0.0236%	12	25,374	Conservative Party challenger John Jackson defeated Labour Party incumbent Arthur Champion 25,374–25,362.
2026	(United States) (Indiana)	Indiana State Senate primary	District 23	0.0237%	3	12,671	State Sen. Spencer Deery led his opponent Paula Copenhaver by 3 votes after the May primary. Copenhaver filed for a recount and the Recount Commission discarded multiple ballots for lacking clerk validations which put Copenhaver in the lead by 3 votes. Deery challenged the decision in Court and on September 10, 2026 the court overturned the Recount Commission's decision and declared Deery the winner, less than 2 months before the general election.
2010	(United States) (Texas)	Texas House of Representatives	District 48	0.02398%	12	25,023	Election Day results gave Democrat Donna Howard a 16-vote victory. Following a recount, that lead was cut to 12 votes. Republican Dan Neil requested the election by investigated by the House of Representatives. After a four-day hearing headed up by Representative Will Hartnett, Howard was found to have won the election by 4 votes and Neil ultimately dropped the contest. The Secretary of State still reports an official margin of 12 votes.
1964	(United Kingdom)	United Kingdom general	Reading	0.02402%	10	20,815	Conservative Party incumbent Peter Emery defeated Labour Party challenger John Lee 20,815–20,810. Lee would later defeat Emery in 1966.
1822	(United States) (New York (state))	United States House of Representatives	New York's 29th District	0.0241%	1	2,072	Initially, Isaac Wilson and Parmenio Adams had 2,093–2,077 votes. On a recount, the tally changed to 2,071–2,072. One voter had initially written Wilson's name on his ballot, then drew a line through it and stated that he wished his ballot counted as blank. The committee of elections said they could not rule on the ballot since it was not entered into evidence and that they considered it "doubtful, from the evidence, who ought to have been returned". The House then voted 116–85 to seat Adams.
2021	(Canada)	Canadian federal	Châteauguay—Lacolle	0.02412%	12	18,029	Liberal incumbent Brenda Shanahan Defeats Bloc Québécois candidate Patrick O'Hara after a recount.
1900	(Canada)	Canadian federal	Bruce North	0.02418%	1	2,065	Liberal-Conservative incumbent Alexander McNeill defeated Liberal J. E. Campbell. Later the election was voided.
2022	(Italy)	Italian Chamber of Deputies	Ravenna	0.02419%	44	75,596	CDX candidate Alice Buonguerrieri defeated CSX candidate Ouidad Bakkali.
1964	(United Kingdom)	United Kingdom general	Eton and Slough	0.024255%	11	22,681	Conservative Party challenger Anthony Meyer defeated Labour Party incumbent Fenner Brockway 22,681–22,670.
2024	(Germany) (Brandenburg)	Brandenburg state election	Spree-Neiße I	0.025153%	7	11,562	Incumbent minister president Dietmar Woidke barely loses his constituency.
1923	(United Kingdom)	United Kingdom general	Durham, Sedgefield	0.0252%	6	11,093	Conservative Party challenger Leonard Ropner defeated Labour Party incumbent John Herriotts 11,093–11,087.
2016	(United States) (New York (state))	New York Senate	8th District	0.0256%	33	64,499	John Brooks secured a spot in the State Senate by defeating incumbent Republican Michael Venditto.
2017	(Japan)	Japanese general	Niigata 3rd	0.025692%	50	95,644	Independent incumbent Takahiro Kuroiwa defeated LDP's challenger Hiroaki Saito by 50 votes.
1980	(United States) (Utah)	Utah House of Representatives	District 44	0.0259%	1	1,931	A recount gave Republican Bob Curran a 1-vote victory over the incumbent Democrat Jen Patterson, after leading by 2 votes following the official canvass.
2026	(United States) (Florida)	Boca Raton mayoral	Mayor of Boca Raton	0.0262%	5	7,572	The original count saw Andy Thomson win with 7,562-7,556 votes. The machine recount saw him win with a single vote (7,568-7,567) and the manual recount with 5 votes. He was the first Democrat to win in over 30 years.
2018	(United States) (Oregon)	Oregon House of Representatives Republican primary	District 53	0.0265%	2	3,771	Jack Zika defeated Ben Schimmoller.
1914	(Australia)	Australian House of Representatives	Werriwa	0.0266%	7	13,162	John Lynch defeated the sitting member Alfred Conroy by seven votes.
1930	(Canada)	Canadian federal	Norfolk—Elgin	0.0266%	5	9,424	Liberal William H. Taylor defeated Conservative John Lawrence Stansell.
1832	(United States) (Ohio)	United States House of Representatives	Ohio's 7th District	0.02675%	2	3,739	William Allen (later 31st governor of Ohio) defeated general and 11th governor of Ohio Duncan McArthur by two votes: 3739–3737. According to Niles' National Register, a third candidate by the name of Murphy also won 55 votes.
1899	(New Zealand)	New Zealand House of Representatives	Riccarton	0.02678%	1	1,867	Incumbent MP William Rolleston lost his seat to Liberal challenger George Russell after a margin of only 1 vote separated the two on the final count.
1876	(United States) (Massachusetts)	United States House of Representatives	Massachusetts' 3rd District	0.0268%	5	9,313 (depending on which count use)	After much investigation, the Committee of Elections gave Walbridge Field the 5-vote majority over Benjamin Dean.
1970	(United States) (Massachusetts)	Massachusetts House of Representatives Democratic primary	14th Essex	0.02722%	3	5,513	In a three-way race, Edward J. Grimley, Jr. topped Gerard A. Guilmette by three votes, but Guilmette ran in the general and topped him by 2.2%. The two would meet again in both the 1972 primary and general with Grimley winning both, also in close races. Guilmette would then serve two terms representing 25th Essex.
1970	(United States) (Massachusetts)	Massachusetts House of Representatives Democratic primary	17th Worcester	0.02723%	2	3,674	Andrew Collaro defeated Robert J. Bohigian, but then Bohigian defeated him by 900+ votes in the general. Collaro. Bohigian would repeat this process in 1972, and then Collaro would represent 22nd and 15th Worcester from 1974 to 1992. Bohigian would serve until he lost re-election in 1990.
2017	(France)	French legislative (2nd round)	Loiret's 4th constituency	0.0275%	8	14,561	Four-term incumbent Jean-Pierre Door of The Republicans (LR) narrowly defeated Mélusine Harlé of La République En Marche! by eight votes in the second round. Harlé filed an appealed the result to the Constitutional Council, which annulled the election on 18 December 2017 due to the number of ballots not corresponding to the number of signatures in one commune and the improper dissemination of electoral materials which was considered sufficient to potentially have altered the result of the election. Door won the seat in a 2018 election.
1843	(United States) (Indiana)	United States House of Representatives	Indiana's 7th District	0.0276%	3	5,441	Democrat Joseph A. Wright defeated Whig Edward W. McGaughey 5,441–5,438.
2007	(Australia)	Australian federal	Division of McEwen	0.02794%	31	48,339	Liberal Fran Bailey defeated Labor Rob Mitchell following a recount and court challenge.
1891	(Canada)	Canadian federal	Wentworth South	0.02821%	1	1,773	Conservative Franklin Carpenter defeated Liberal James T. Russell.
1914	(United States) (New York (state))	United States House of Representatives	New York's 1st District	0.02822%	10	17,726	Initial election returns handed Republican Frederick C. Hicks, a 15-vote win over Representative Lathrop Brown, a Democrat. A review of ballots by the New York Supreme Court took more than a year, and when it was completed the lead was cut to four votes, 17,726 to 17,722. A review by the Court of Appeals changed the plurality to 10 votes. Hicks was issued a certificate of election on December 21, 1915 – more than 13 months after he election, making this one of the longest in the history of the House. Brown contested the election, arguing that there were errors made by the inspectors (and that some precinct workers were drunk on election day), but the House found that they could not review the ballots unless the returns had been discredited, which they had not.
1970	(United States) (Rhode Island)	Rhode Island House of Representatives	District 26	0.0284%	1	1,760	After recounts, Democrat John F. Hagan beat the Republican nominee Benedetto A. Cerilli.
1997	(United Kingdom)	United Kingdom general	Torbay	0.0285%	12	21,094	Liberal Democrat candidate Adrian Sanders gained the seat from the sitting Conservative MP Rupert Allason.
1887	(Canada)	Canadian federal	Haldimand	0.02865%	1	1,746	Conservative Walter Humphries Montague defeated Liberal incumbent Charles Wesley Colter.
1896	(Canada)	Canadian federal	Selkirk	0.02920%	1	1,713	Liberal John Alexander MacDonell defeated Conservative Hugh Armstrong.
1979	(United States) (Virginia)	Virginia Senate	District 37	0.0293%	9	15,379	Madison Marye (D) defeated Edwin E. Stone (R) by 20 votes and a December 4, 1979 narrowed the margin to 9.
1935	(Canada)	Canadian federal	Vancouver—Burrard	0.0294%	6	10,215	Liberal Gerald Grattan McGeer defeated Co-operative Commonwealth candidate Arnold Alexander Webster by 6 votes.
2016	(Philippines)	Philippine House of Representatives	Northern Samar's 1st District	0.02951%	47	80,157	Liberal incumbent Raul Daza defeated Nacionalista Harlin Abayon in a rematch of the 2013 election where Abayon won by 52 votes. Daza won against Abayon's protest in the House of Representatives Electoral Tribunal.
2020	(Vanuatu)	Vanuatuan general election	Banks	0.0300%	1	1,091	Danny Silas defeated Jack Wona by 1 vote.
2004	(Philippines)	Philippine Senate	At-large	0.0301%	10,685	10,635,270	The Philippine Senate is elected via multiple non-transferable vote. The 12th placed candidate, Rodolfo Biazon of the Lakas, edged out partymate Robert Barbers to win out the last Senate seat.
1912	(United States) (California)	United States presidential	California	0.0307%	174	283,610	Former President Theodore Roosevelt, running on the Republican and Progressive ballot lines in California (Republican President William Howard Taft was not on the ballot in the state, although he did receive 3,914 write-in votes), narrowly edged out Democrat Woodrow Wilson in California, but Wilson won a landslide in the Electoral College due to divided Republican opposition.
1998	(United States) (New Hampshire)	New Hampshire Senate	District 16	0.0318%	5	7,867	Patricia Krueger (R) defeated Stephen DeStefano (D) by 16 votes. Following a recount that was narrowed to 7. DeStefano appealed the recount but the count was only changed by 2 votes.
1945	(United Kingdom)	United Kingdom general	Manchester, Rusholme	0.0324%	10	15,408	Labour Party candidate (unofficial) Hugh Lester Hutchinson defeated Conservative Party incumbent Frederick William Cundiff 15,408–15,398.
1976	(United States) (Massachusetts)	United States House of Representatives Democratic primary	Massachusetts's 1st District	0.0330%	13	19,694	Edward McColgan beat Edward O'Brien and then lost the general election.
1917	(Australia)	Australian House of Representatives	Macquarie	0.0331%	9	13,566	Samuel Nicholls defeated the sitting member Ernest Carr by nine votes.
1935	(Canada)	Canadian federal	Souris	0.0333%	3	4,504	Liberal-Progressive George William McDonald defeated Progressive Conservative incumbent Errick French Willis.
2011	(New Zealand)	New Zealand general	Waitakere	0.0334%	9	13,465	National incumbent Paula Bennett retained her seat over Labour challenger Carmel Sepuloni after a judicial recount was requested by Bennett. The original official result had Sepuloni winning with a margin of 11 votes.
1929	(United Kingdom)	United Kingdom general	Birmingham Ladywood	0.0335%	11	16,447	Labour Party candidate Wilfrid Whiteley defeated Conservative Party candidate Geoffrey Lloyd 16,447–16,436.
2018	(United States) (Virginia)	Virginia House of Delegates Republican primary	District 24	0.033523%	1	1,068	Ronnie R. Campbell beat Jimmy Ayers and two other challengers in a special primary election caused by Ben Cline being elected to the U.S. House of Representatives.
2011	(United Kingdom) (Scotland)	Scottish Parliament	Glasgow Anniesland	0.0339%	7	10,329	Incumbent Labour MSP Bill Butler was defeated by Bill Kidd of the Scottish National Party (SNP).
1964	(United Kingdom)	United Kingdom general	Preston North	0.0340%	14	20,566	Conservative Party incumbent Julian Amery defeated Labour Party challenger Russell Kerr 20,566–20,552.
2016	(Jamaica)	Jamaican general	Saint Mary South Eastern	0.0341%	5	7,324	People's National Party incumbent Winston Green defeated Jamaica Labour Party challenger Norman Alexander Dunn 7,324–7,319.
2006	(United States) (Connecticut)	United States House of Representatives	Connecticut's 2nd District	0.0342%	83	121,248	Democratic challenger Joe Courtney was up 167 votes on Republican incumbent Rob Simmons after the initial vote. On the recount, Courtney remained the victor by 83 votes: 121,248–121,165.
1955	(United States) (Virginia)	Virginia House of Delegates	District 55	0.0346%	2	2,891	John A. Mackenzie (D) defeated William J. Moody (D)
2020	(United States) (New York (state))	United States House of Representatives	New York's 22nd District	0.0349%	109	156,098	Republican Claudia Tenney, after a lengthy set of recounts and court cases, defeated Anthony Brindisi by 109 votes in a race that was not decided until early February. When the polls initially closed, Tenney held a large 28,422-vote lead based on the in-person vote. But as mail-in ballots poured in, her lead dwindled to 12 votes. As the courts reviewed ballots the lead grew and shrank until a judge ruled the race over and that Tenney should be certified. With appeals still pending, Brindisi conceded and dropped all legal challenges on February 8, 2021.
2018	(United States) (Kentucky)	Kentucky House of Representatives	District 96	0.035%	5	7,136	Incumbent Republican Jill York lost to Democrat Kathy Hinkle.
2015	(Argentina) (Córdoba Province, Argentina)	Córdoba Legislature	Pocho Department	0.03546%	1	1,106	Hugo Cuello (Union for Córdoba) won the seat for the Pocho Department by 1,106 votes against Raúl Recalde (Together for Córdoba) 1,105 votes.
1978	(United States) (New Hampshire)	New Hampshire Senate Republican primary	District 14	0.03560%	3	4,215	Incumbent Thomas J. Claveau (D) defeated Phyllis Keeney (R).
1922	(United States) (Illinois)	United States House of Representatives	Illinois' 6th District	0.03564%	42	58,928	Democrat James R. Buckley defeated incumbent Republican John J. Gorman by 42 votes. Gorman contested the election on the basis that there were many errors, mistakes, and irregularities and a recount would show he had won. However Gorman failed to submit his evidence within the 30 days required and therefore had no standing. In a rematch in 1924, Gorman regained his seat.
1964	(United States) (Nevada)	United States Senate	Nevada	0.03565%	48	67,336	Democratic incumbent Howard Cannon defeated Republican Paul Laxalt.
2013	(Philippines)	Philippine House of Representatives	Northern Samar's 1st District	0.03569%	52	72,857	Nacionalista Harlin Abayon defeated Liberal incumbent Raul Daza. Daza won on a recount by the House of Representatives Electoral Tribunal and replaced Abayon, but Abayon won an appeal in the Supreme Court. Abayon was still not seated in the last day of the 16th Congress.
1945	(Canada)	Canadian federal	Colchester—Hants	0.0357%	8	11,141	Progressive Conservative Frank Stanfield defeated Liberal incumbent Gordon Timlin Purdy.
1982	(United States) (Maine)	Maine House of Representatives	District 69	0.03606%	1	1,387	Unofficial counts said it was tied, but all subsequent counts were 1,387–1,386 Winner was Walter R. Sherburne.
1916	(United States) (North Carolina)	United States House of Representatives	North Carolina's 10th District	0.03611%	13	18,008	When ballots were originally canvassed, James J. Britt held a scant 13-vote lead over challenger Zebulon Weaver. However, Buncombe County decided to accept 90 unmarked ballots (ballots that were printed as either Republican or Democratic ballots) and those ballots gave Weaver an 8-vote lead. Weaver was certified and provisionally seated while Britt contested the election. The House found in his favor, but by the time he was sworn in, there was only four days remaining in his term.
1990	(United States) (Ohio)	Ohio general	Ohio Attorney General	0.03672%	1,234	1,680,698	Democratic candidate Lee Fisher defeated Republican Paul Pfeifer after a six-week recount, earning him the ironic nickname "Landslide Lee".
2000	(Canada)	Canadian federal	Champlain	0.03674%	15	20,423	Bloc Québécois candidate Marcel Gagnon narrowly edged out Liberal Julie Boulet.
1859	(United States) (Tennessee)	United States House of Representatives	Tennessee's 9th District	0.0371%	7	9,437	Emerson Etheridge defeated Democrat John DeWitt Clinton Atkins, 9,437–9,430.
1922	(United Kingdom)	United Kingdom general	Manchester, Clayton	0.0372%	11	14,800	Conservative Party candidate William Henry Flanagan defeated Labour Party candidate John Edward Sutton, 14,800–14,789. Sutton had beaten Flanagan in the by-election earlier that year.
2024	(United States) (New Hampshire)	2024 New Hampshire House of Representatives Republican primary	District Rockingham 40	0.0373%	1	1,340	Linda McGrath beat Richard Sawyer.
2018	(Australia) (Victoria (state))	Victoria Legislative Assembly	Electoral district of Ripon	0.03745%	15	20,035	Incumbent Louise Staley of the Liberal Party defeated Sarah de Santis of the Labor Party.
2018	(United States) (Alaska)	Alaska House of Representatives	District 1	0.03755%	1	2,663	Republican nominee Bart LeBon defeated Democrat Kathryn Dodge 2,663-2,662 following a recount and a state supreme court challenge. Dodge challenged the findings of the Division of Elections on three ballots, two that were counted and one that was not, but the Supreme Court upheld the count and Dodge conceded. The race decided control of the Alaska House of Representatives, technically giving Republicans a majority, but due to defections created a 20–20 tie instead of Democratic control. After weeks of deadlock, Bryce Edgmon (who originally won his seat with a coin toss) switched his party affiliation from Democratic to Independent and was re-elected Speaker and several committees were set up with bipartisan leadership.
1951	(United Kingdom)	United Kingdom general	Belfast West	0.03769%	25	33,174	Irish Labour candidate Jack Beattie defeated UUP incumbent Thomas Teevan, 33,174–33,149.
1968	(Canada)	Canadian federal	Comox—Alberni	0.03771%	9	11,939	Liberal Richard Durante defeated New Democratic incumbent Thomas Speakman Barnett. The result was later declared void and Durante lost the by-election to Barnett in 1969.
1935	(United Kingdom)	United Kingdom general	Kingswinford	0.0382%	16	20,925	Labour Party challenger Arthur Henderson defeated Conservative Party incumbent Alan Livesey Stuart Todd, 20,925–20,909.
2023	(United States) (Virginia)	Virginia State Senate Republican primary	29	0.0384%	2	2,605	Democrat Nikki Baldwin defeated Maria Martin.
1896	(Canada)	Canadian federal	York East	0.03841%	1	3,907	Independent Conservative incumbent William F. McLean defeated Liberal Henry R. Frankland. F
2008	(Canada)	Canadian federal	Kitchener—Waterloo	0.0390%	17	21,830	Conservative Peter Braid defeated Liberal Andrew Telegdi after a recount.
1828	(United States) (New York (state))	United States House of Representatives	New York's 20th District	0.03917%	7	8,939	In 1828, the 20th district had two representatives and all candidates ran in one race. Jacksonian Silas Wright, Jr. finished in 3rd place, 7 votes behind Adams-supporter George Fisher. Wright contested the outcome and a House investigation found that 130 votes for Wright had not been returned for him because of mistakes by election officials. The House removed Fisher, who did not object to the outcome and resigned, and gave the seat to Wright. Wright in the meantime had been elected state comptroller and so he refused to qualify for the seat, which was later filled by a special election.
1992	(United Kingdom)	United Kingdom general	Vale of Glamorgan	0.03923%	19	24,220	Conservative Party challenger Walter Sweeney defeated Labour Party incumbent John William Patrick Smith, 24,220–24,201. Smith would beat Sweeney in 1997.
2008	(United States) (Alaska)	Alaska House of Representatives	District 7	0.0398%	4	5,024	Incumbent Republican Mike Kelly defeated Democratic challenger Karl Kassel, 5,024–5,020, following a recount.
1990	(United States) (Illinois)	Illinois House of Representatives	55th district	0.0406%	6	7,392	Initially, Rosemary Mulligan and Penny Pullen were certified as having 7,431–7,400 votes and Mulligan was declared the winner. The trial court ordered a recount that then had them tied at 7,387–7,387. The Illinois Compiled Statutes required that ties be resolved by lot. Mulligan won the coin flip and was declared the winner by the trial court. Pullen then appealed, and the Illinois Supreme Court decided that the correct vote count was 7,392–7,386, with Pullen declared the winner. Two years later Mulligan took another swing at the seat, and defeated Pullen in a race so close it also required a recount.
2024	(United Kingdom)	United Kingdom general	Poole	0.04045%	18	14,168	Labour's candidate Neil Duncan-Jordan narrowly defeated the Conservative candidate Robert Syms by only 18 votes. The result was declared after three recounts.
2022	(United States) (New Hampshire)	New Hampshire House of Representatives	Coos 7 District	0.0407997%	2	2,452	Democrat Eamon Kelley defeated republican John Greer.
1991	(United States) (Virginia)	Virginia House of Delegates	District 58	0.0408%	7	8,561	C. Timothy Lindstrom (D) was originally declared the winner, but later it was discovered that election officials in Greene County misread a "9" as a "0" and Peter Way (R) went on to win the election.
2013	(United States) (Virginia)	Virginia General	Virginia Attorney General	0.0411%	907	1,105,045	Democratic candidate Mark Herring defeated Republican candidate Mark Obenshain. The initial count was 1,103,777–1,103–612—a 165 or 0.01% margin. The recount was 1,105,045–1,104,138 — a 907 or 0.04% margin.
1994	(United States) (Massachusetts)	Massachusetts Governor's Council Democratic primary	4th District	0.0420%	26	30,989	Christopher A. Iannella, Jr. defeated John J. Kerrigan. Iannella won the general unopposed.
2024	(United States) (Pennsylvania)	Pennsylvania House of Representatives Republican primary	District 117	0.04226%	4	4,735	Incumbent Mike Cabell lost to Jamie Walsh.
1870	(United States) (South Carolina)	United States House of Representatives	South Carolina's At-large District (unrecognized)	0.0425%	61	71,803	South Carolina was readmitted to Congress in 1868, after passage of the 14th Amendment. That amendment ended the three-fifths rule effectively raising the population of states that once had slavery. As a result, South Carolina and other slave states tried to seat extra members of Congress. South Carolina choose two additional congress members during at-large election. In one of those, Johann Peter Martin Epping defeated Lucius W. Wimbush by 61 votes: 71,803–71,742. But the House refused to seat him and the other at-large winner. "A number of southern states upon readmission claimed that since their slaves were emancipated, they were entitled to larger delegations in the House. Epping's election falls in this category. The claims were rejected by the House."
1995	(Australia) (Queensland)	Queensland Legislative Assembly	Mundingburra	0.04301%	16	18,600	General election saw return of Australian Labor Party MP Ken Davies over his Liberal Party rival, Frank Tanti, after distribution of preferences of minor candidates, by just 16 votes. However, due to the non-arrival of some overseas military ballots, a Court of Disputed Returns required a fresh election, at which Tanti won. As this seat was the difference between a Labor Party majority and a Liberal Party supported by an independent MP, the overturning of the result was a rare example of the fate of an entire government resting on a challenge to an ultra-close constituency.
2018	(United States) (Kentucky)	Kentucky House of Representatives	District 27	0.04326%	6	6,938	Incumbent Democrat Jeff Greer lost to Republican Nancy Tate.
2014	(Australia) (South Australia)	Parliament of South Australia	Fisher state by-election	0.04371%	9	10,299	A by-election was caused by the death of sitting independent MP Bob Such. The Australian Labor Party candidate Nat Cook beat the Liberal Party candidate, Heidi Harris, by nine votes.
1974	(Canada)	Canadian federal	Drummond	0.0447%	13	15,561	Liberal Yvon Pinard defeated Social Credit incumbent Jean-Marie Boisvert.
1979	(Canada)	Canadian federal	Halifax	0.0453%	15	16,570	Progressive Conservative George Cooper defeated Liberal Brian Flemming.
1996	(Japan)	Japanese general	Chiba 4th	0.045513%	105	73,792	LDP's candidate Shoichi Tanaka defeated NFP's candidate Yoshihiko Noda by 105 votes (new seat).
2006	(United States) (Vermont)	Vermont Auditor of Accounts	Vermont Auditor of Accounts	0.0456%	102	111,770	The initial count gave the victory to Randy Brock (R) by 137 votes, but after a recount, Thomas M. Salmon (D) was declared the winner by just 102 votes. The final tally gave Salmon 111,770 votes and Republican Brock 111,668.
1922	(United Kingdom)	United Kingdom general	Portsmouth, Central	0.0457%	7	7,666	In this four-way race, Conservative Party candidate Frank Privett defeated National Liberal candidate T. Fisher 7,666–7,659.
2005	(Canada)	British Columbia general	Vancouver-Burrard	0.0458%	11	12,009	On election night, Tim Stevenson of the British Columbia New Democratic Party had the lead over Lorne Mayencourt of the British Columbia Liberal Party, but Mayencourt had a 17-vote lead after a recount. When the absentee ballots were counted later, Maynecourt widened his lead by one vote. Following an additional recount ordered by the courts, Maynecourt retained an 11-vote lead and was declared the winner. Stevenson sued, arguing that 71 absentee ballots had improperly certified and thus uncounted and that a new election was needed, but then dropped the suit to run for a seat on the city council.
2024	(Canada)	British Columbia general	Surrey-Guildford	0.00116%	22	8,938	On election night, BC Conservative Candidate Honveer Singh Randhawa was ahead, but this flipped to a 27-vote victory for NDP incumbent Garry Begg after all mail-in ballots were counted. A recount reduced this margin down to 22 votes. Garry Begg was certified as the winner. However, Randhawa contested this election with a petition after 22 mail-in ballots were sent to a mental health facility without ensuring that an election official was present, as required by the Election Act. Elections BC would reject this claim, stating that a petition can only be made on the basis of alleged contraventions of sections 255-258 of the Election Act, and the petition was rejected. Further appeals would also be rejected.
1960	(United States) (Indiana)	United States House of Representatives	Indiana's 5th District	0.0461%	99	107,357	In the official count after election day, Republican George O. Chambers defeated Democrat J. Edward Roush by 3 votes and by 12 votes after the canvas. He was certified as the winner, but Roush contested the outcome and the Democrat-controlled House first decided that neither should be seated. After a review of the ballots, the House Committee determined that Roush had won the seat by 99 votes and on June 14, 1961, passed a resolution to seat him.
2024	(United Kingdom)	United Kingdom general	Basildon and Billericay	0.0464%	20	12,905	Before the election, Richard Holden, who was serving as the Chairman of the Conservative Party, was selected as a parachute candidate to this constituency. He won with 20 votes.
1965	(Philippines)	Philippine Senate	At-large	0.0469%	3,567	2,972,525	The Philippine Senate is elected via multiple non-transferable vote. The 8th placed candidate, Wenceslao Lagumbay of the Nacionalista Party, edged out Cesar Climaco of the Liberal Party to win out the last Senate seat.
2022	(United States) (New Hampshire)	New Hampshire House of Representatives	Grafton 18 District	0.0473%	4	4,229	Republican John Sellers defeated Democrat Carolyn Fluehr-Lobban.
2018	(United States) (Kentucky)	Kentucky House of Representatives	District 91	0.0474%	7	7,385	Incumbent Republican Toby Herald lost to Democrat Cluster Howard.
1993	(Canada)	Canadian federal	Edmonton Northwest	0.0476%	12	12,599	Liberal candidate Anne McLellan narrowly edged out Reform candidate Richard Kayler.
1853	(United States) (Georgia (U.S. state))	United States House of Representatives	Georgia's 3rd District	0.0478%	5	5,232	Democrat David J. Bailey defeated Whig Robert P. Trippe 5232–5227.
1972	(United States) (Connecticut)	Connecticut House of Representatives 65th district Democratic primary	Connecticut	0.0481%	1	2,079	Representatives Addo Bonetti and John J. Miscikowski were both moved into the 65th district after legislative redistricting in 1972. Bonetti was initially defeated in the primary by Miscikowski by one vote and a recount maintained Miscikowski's one vote victory. However, Judge George Saden invalidated the primary and ordered a new one due to a Republican having mistakenly voted in the primary. Bonetti defeated Miscikowski in the second primary and won in the general election against Republican nominee Edwin R. Chadwick.
2017	(United Kingdom)	United Kingdom general	Perth and North Perthshire	0.0482%	21	21,804	The incumbent Scottish National Party narrowly defeated Conservative candidate Ian Duncan.
1945	(United Kingdom)	United Kingdom general	Cheshire, Northwich	0.0486%	15	15,477	In this three-way race, Conservative Party candidate John Foster defeated Labour Party candidate Prof. Robert Chorley 15,477–15,473.
1968	(Canada)	Canadian federal	Oshawa—Whitby	0.0493%	15	15,224	New Democrat Ed Broadbent defeated Progressive Conservative incumbent Michael Starr.
2014	(Ukraine)	Ukrainian parliamentary	79th constituency (Vasylivka)	0.0495%	17	17,197	An independent representative of Zaporizhia Iron Ore Works Oleksandr Hryhorchuk initially defeated the pro-Party of Regions incumbent Volodymyr Bandurov by 138 votes. Bandurov contested the result and obtained a recount, and won with a margin of 17 votes following the recount. Hryhorchuk contested the recount as irregular.
2016	(United States) (Connecticut)	Connecticut House of Representatives	District 90	0.0496%	7	7,055	Incumbent Republican Craig C. Fishbein defeated Democratic challenger Jim Jinks.
2016	(United States) (Vermont)	Vermont House of Representatives	Windsor-Orange 1 District	0.0498%	1	1,004	This was the fourth matchup between incumbent Democrat Sarah Buxton and Republican David Ainsworth (their first matchup had also been decided by one vote). The initial tally had Buxton leading by 3 votes: 1,003–1,000. The first recount had them both tied at 1,000. The second recount then had Ainsworth win by one vote, 1,004–1,003. Buxton did not make any further appeals and this was the final result.
1940	(United States) (Kansas)	Kansas gubernatorial	Governor of Kansas	0.0505%	430	425,928	Burke came within 430 votes of beating Gov. Ratner for reelection.
1854	(United States) (Pennsylvania)	United States House of Representatives	Pennsylvania's 5th District	0.0510%	8	7,842	Democrat John Cadwalader defeated anti-Nebraska Whig Jones 7,842–7,834.
2009	(Canada) (Quebec)	Party Leader (second ballot)	Action démocratique du Québec	0.0511%	2	1,957	After longtime leader Mario Dumont stepped down from the leadership of the party, an election was held. In a very close race, Gilles Taillon defeated his opponent Éric Caire, by just 2 votes.
2024	(South Carolina)	South Carolina Senate	Senate District 17	0.05186%	9	27,953	Republican challenger Everett Stubbs defeated Democratic incumbent Mike Fanning.
1833	(United States) (Indiana)	United States House of Representatives	Indiana's 2nd District	0.0520%	2	1,921	In this 6-way race, Whig John Ewing defeated Democrat John W. Davis by 2 votes: 1921–1919.
2020	(United States) (Pennsylvania)	Pennsylvania Senate	District 45	0.0521%	69	66,261	When this race was certified in early December, after numerous court battles, Democrat Jim Brewster had 69 votes more than Republican Nicole Ziccarelli. However a dispute over 311 absentee and mail-in ballots that were signed, but not dated lingered in the courts into January. Though Brewster was certified, Republicans in the state Senate blocked Brewster from taking his oath of office and removed the Democratic lieutenant governor from his role overseeing the proceedings. A week later, after Ziccarelli lost her appeal, she conceded and Brewster was sworn in.
2024	(United States) (Idaho)	Idaho House of Representatives Republican primary	District 30	0.053%	4	3,764	Incumbent Julianne Young lost to Ben Fuhriman.
2025	(Canada) (Ontario)	Ontario general	Mississauga—Erin Mills	0.0531%	20	16,665	Progressive Conservative incumbent Sheref Sabawy narrowly won re-election by just 20 votes over Liberal candidate Qasir Dar.
1870	(United States) (Pennsylvania)	United States House of Representatives	Pennsylvania's 17th District	0.05324%	11	10,335	Democratic challenger Milton Speer defeated Republican incumbent Daniel J. Morrell by 11 votes: 10335–10324. Morrell declined to contest the results, blaming the loss on the "base treachery and debauchery of professed Republicans."
2024	(South Dakota)	South Dakota House of Representatives	House District 15	0.05236%	9	4,365	Democratic nominee Erik Muckey defeated Republican candidate Joni Tschetter for this district's second seat.
2020	(United States) (Michigan)	Michigan House of Representatives Republican primary	District 18	0.05348%	4	2,775	Michael Babat defeated Christine Timmon.
2016	(United States) (Arizona)	United States House of Representatives Republican primary	Arizona's 5th District	0.0535%	27	85,595	On the night of the Republican primary for the seat being vacated by Congressman Matt Salmon, State Senator Andy Biggs led by a total of 16 votes against Republican challenger Christine Jones. After a recount, that lead widened to 27 votes, and Jones conceded the election.
2022	(United States) (Iowa)	Iowa State Senate Republican primary	District 42	0.05353%	2	1,518	Charlie McClintock beat Colman Silbernagel and Justin Wasson.
2000	(United States) (Minnesota)	United States House of Representatives	Minnesota's 2ndd District	0.0537%	155	288,900	Republican Mark Kennedy won against DFL incumbent David Minge 138,957-138,802.
1945	(United Kingdom)	United Kingdom general	Caithness and Sutherland	0.0539%	6	5,564	In this very close three-way race where each candidate received 33% of the vote, Unionist Party candidate Eric Gandar Dower defeated Labour Party candidate Robert Ian Aonas MacInnes 5,564–5,558. The incumbent, Liberal Party leader Archibald Sinclair, had 5,503 votes.
1974	(United Kingdom)	United Kingdom general	Peterborough	0.05407%	22	20,353	Conservative Party incumbent Sir Harmar Nicholls defeated Labour Party challenger Michael Ward 20,353–20,331. Ward had also lost to Nicholls in 1966 and 1970, but would win in Oct 1974.
1983	(United Kingdom)	United Kingdom general	Hyndburn	0.05414%	21	19,405	Conservative Party candidate Ken Hargreaves defeated Labour Party candidate Arthur Davidson 19,405–19,384. This seat was created in 1983.
1838	(United States) (New Jersey)	United States House of Representatives	New Jersey's at-large District	0.05455%	31	28,426	For much of its early history, New Jersey chose all of its Congressional delegation in an at-large election, with each voter getting to vote for however many candidates that there were seats and usually each party's slate of candidates would thus have similar numbers of votes. In 1838, New Jersey had six seats and so each voter could vote for six candidates. The voting for the parties was very close and at first it appeared that all 6 Whig candidates had been re-elected and their election was certified by the Whig governor who applied the states "broad seal" to them. The Democrats contested the election on the grounds that the votes of two townships were excluded and that if included would have swung the election and this became known as the "Broad Seal War". The House, which held a 2-seat majority without the New Jersey delegation, decided to seat one of the Whigs but leave the other 5 seats vacant. After the contest was investigated, and the excluded votes counted, 5 of the 6 Democrats were declared winners. They were seated in July 1840. In the end only 197 votes separated the Democrat's best finisher from the Whig's worst. Charles C. Stratton came in 7th, only 31 votes behind Democrat Joseph Kille a difference of only 0.05455%. John P. B. Maxwell missed out by 40 votes, or 0.0703%. The 6 Democrats averaged 28,429 votes and the Whigs 28,360 for an average advantage of only 69 votes or 0.12%.
2014	(United States) (Tennessee)	United States House of Representatives Republican Primary	Tennessee's 4th District	0.05464%	38	69,548	Scandal-plagued Republican candidate Scott DesJarlais defeated candidate Jim Tracy.
1986	(United States) (North Carolina)	United States House of Representatives	North Carolina's 6th District	0.05465%	79	144,579	Republican candidate Howard Coble defeated Democratic candidate Robin Britt.
1964	(United Kingdom)	United Kingdom general	Ealing North	0.0561%	27	20,809	Labour Party challenger William Molloy defeated Conservative Party incumbent John Barter 20,809–20,782.
2024	(New Hampshire)	New Hampshire House of Representatives	Hillsborough 2 District	0.05635%	51	6,546	Republican candidate John Schneller defeated fellow Republican Peter Kujawski for this district's seventh seat.
2012	(United States) (Iowa)	United States presidential	Iowa Republican caucuses	0.0570%	34	29,839	Former U.S. Senator Rick Santorum defeated former Massachusetts Governor Mitt Romney in the statewide Republican caucuses, the closest GOP primary election in United States history. Romney had been declared the winner by 8 votes on caucus night.
1930	(United States) (Kansas)	Kansas gubernatorial	Governor of Kansas	0.0576%	251	217,171	Harry H. Woodring won a three-way race between himself (217,171 votes), Frank Haucke (216,920), and John R. Brinkley (183,278). Many of Brinkley's votes were misspelled and did not count.
1903	(Australia)	Australian House of Representatives	Riverina	0.0576%	5	4,341	Robert Blackwood defeated the sitting member John Chanter by five votes. The result was overturned and Chanter won a by-election by 363 votes.
2014	(Ukraine)	Ukrainian parliamentary	22nd constituency (Lutsk)	0.0578%	28	24,245	Ihor Lapin (People's Front), defeated Iryna Konstankevych, an ally of the incumbent Ihor Palytsia (who was a candidate on the Petro Poroshenko Bloc party list instead), 24,245–24,217.
1959	(United Kingdom)	United Kingdom general	Birmingham All Saints	0.05806%	20	17,235	Conservative Party challenger John Harold Hollingworth defeated Labour Party incumbent Denis Herbert Howell 17,235–17,215.
2011	(Canada)	Canadian federal	Nipissing—Timiskaming	0.05812%	18	15,495	Conservative Jay Aspin defeated Liberal incumbent Anthony Rota.
1870	(United States) (Pennsylvania)	United States House of Representatives	Pennsylvania's 16th District	0.0584%	15	12,859	Democratic challenger Benjamin F. Meyers defeated Republican incumbent John Cessna by 15 votes: 12,859–12,844. Cessna contested the election and on January 18, 1872, the House Committee on Elections decided in favor of Meyers. In a rematch later that year, Cessna reclaimed his seat.
1990	(United States) (Massachusetts)	Massachusetts House of Representatives Democratic primary	11th Essex	0.0599%	5	4,175	Edward J. Clancy Jr. defeated Thomas M. McGee.
1972	(Canada) (Newfoundland and Labrador)	Newfoundland general	Labrador South	0.06%	1	1,865	Josiah Harvey of the Liberal Party narrowly held onto his seat against Labrador Party candidate Michael Martin. A rematch was held later that year, in which Martin won the seat.
2005	(Japan)	Japanese general	Kyoto 4th	0.06012%	156	75,192	Kyoto 4th district's incumbent Hideo Tanaka belonged to LDP. However, LDP expelled Tanaka because he opposed the postal privatization bill. LDP nominated Yasuhiro Nakagawa as a candidate. As a result, Nakagawa defeated Tanaka by 156 votes.
2020	(Ghana)	Ghanaian general	Sene West	0.0606%	16	13,116	Incumbent Kwame Twumasi Ampofo of the National Democratic Congress narrowly won reelection against Joseph Kumah Mackey of the New Patriotic Party. The Electoral Commission took longer than expected to declare a winner, in part due to the closeness of the election and in part due to an incident in which a member of the NPP stole a ballot box which had to be inspected. This result led to a hung parliament as a single independent prevented either party from reaching a majority of seats (although the lone independent decided to vote with the NPP).
2012	(Ukraine)	Ukrainian parliamentary	184th constituency (Nova Kakhovka)	0.0607%	22	18,123	In a first-past-the-post race with 9 candidates, he Party of Regions candidate Mykola Dmytruk defeated an independent Ivan Vynnyk 18,123 (19.99%)–18,101 (19.96%). Vynnyk contested the result, stating that official counts from all polling places make him the winner with a margin of 177 votes and requested a new vote. The Supreme Administrative Court of Ukraine declined, Vynnyk appealed to the European Court of Human Rights.
2017	(France)	French legislative (2nd round)	Corrèze's 2nd constituency	0.06105%	23	18,849	Frédérique Meunier of The Republicans (LR) narrowly held onto his seat against ex-Socialist senator Patricia Bordas, invested by La République En Marche! (REM).
2017	(United Kingdom)	United Kingdom general	Kensington	0.06126%	20	16,333	Labour Emma Dent Coad defeated Conservative Victoria Borwick after three recounts over two days.
2016	(United States) (New Hampshire)	New Hampshire Senate	District 7	0.06128%	17	13,880	The initial count showed Republican Harold French with a 13-vote lead over Democrat Andrew Hosmer. Following a recount, that widened to 17 votes.
1950	(United States) (Michigan)	Michigan gubernatorial	Governor of Michigan	0.0614%	1,154	935,152	Incumbent Democratic G. Mennen Williams defeated Republican former Governor Harry Kelly.
2018	(United States) (Idaho)	Idaho Senate	District 15	0.0615%	11	8,947	The initial count showed Incumbent Republican Fred Martin ahead with a 6-vote lead over Democratic challenger Jim Bratnober. Following a recount, that widened to 11 votes.
2018	(United States) (Washington (state))	Washington State Senate	District 42	0.06204%	45	36,291	Republican incumbent Doug Erickson defeated Democrat Pinky Vargas by 45 votes after a recount.
2014	(Japan)	Japanese general	Niigata 2nd	0.062077%	102	70,589	LDP's incumbent Kenichi Hosoda defeated DPJ's challenger Eiichiro Washio by 102 votes.
2010	(United States) (Illinois)	Illinois gubernatorial Republican primary	Governor of Illinois	0.06209%	193	155,527	Bill Brady defeated Kirk Dillard.
1998	(United States) (South Dakota)	South Dakota House of Representatives	District 12	0.06217%	4	3,219	In this remarkable rematch, four candidates, Democrats John R. McIntyre and Robert Litz; and Republicans Hal Wick and Judy Rost, were contesting two seats. On the initial count, they had respectively 3,229 (25.84%), 2,250 (18.00%), 3,229 (25.84%), and 3,790 (30.32%) (12,498 total votes). As in 1996, Rost won the first seat, while McIntyre and Wick tied for the second seat. But on a recount, McIntyre was found to be ahead by 4 votes, with the final official tally being 3,219 (25.85%), 2,244 (18.02%), 3,215 (25.81%), 3,776 (30.32%) (12,454 total votes). The House then voted 36–33, this time to seat McIntyre.
1892	(United States) (California)	United States presidential	California	0.06224%	147	269,609	Former President Grover Cleveland narrowly carried California over Republican President Benjamin Harrison and went on to reclaim the presidency in a rematch of the 1888 presidential elections, thus becoming both the 22nd and 24th president of the United States.
1960	(United States) (Hawaii)	United States presidential	Hawaii	0.06226%	115	92,410	Just a year after becoming the fiftieth state, Hawaii surprised many political experts by voting for Democrat John F. Kennedy over Republican Richard Nixon, albeit by a very small margin. In early unofficial results Kennedy won the state by 92 votes and when the tabulated results were audited it was found to be incorrect and the results were changed to Nixon winning by 141 votes before a recount was done revealing that Kennedy won by 115 votes. The recount in Hawaii was the only state recount done in the 1960 presidential election.
1970	(United States) (Massachusetts)	Massachusetts House of Representatives Democratic primary	6th Hampden	0.0625%	3	2,400	In a three-way race, James L. Grimaldi topped Anthony M. Scibelli by three votes. Grimaldi would win the general, but then lose the 1972 primary to Scibelli. He would win the seat in 14th Hampden twice and then lose the seat for 10th Hampden to Scibelli. Scibelli would serve from 1972 to 2000.
1976	(United States) (Massachusetts)	Massachusetts Senate Democratic primary	2nd Essex and Middlesex	0.06262%	13	10,386	William X. Wall defeated James M. Shannon on his way to winning the seat.
2013	(Australia)	Australian federal	Division of Fairfax	0.06264%	53	42,330	Clive Palmer (Palmer United Party) defeated Ted O'Brien of the Liberal National Party of Queensland following two recounts in a ranked choice voting instant runoff.
2007	(Philippines)	Philippine Senate	At-large	0.0628%	18,519	11,005,866	The Philippine Senate is elected via multiple non-transferable vote. The 12th placed candidate, Migz Zubiri of TEAM Unity, edged out Koko Pimentel of GO to win out the last Senate seat. Pimentel later filed an electoral protest. Four years later, after recounts in the Senate Electoral Tribunal showed Pimentel taking the lead, Zubiri resigned; Pimentel was then proclaimed senator-elect, with Pimentel having a 258,166-vote lead over Zubiri.
1896	(United States) (Kentucky)	United States presidential	Kentucky	0.06352%	277	218,171	William McKinley was elected president twice by comfortable Electoral College majorities, but his only victory in a Southern state was his razor-thin win over William Jennings Bryan in Kentucky in his initial presidential run, becoming the first Republican ever to win Kentucky. McKinley won Kentucky; however one Elector cast a vote for Bryan.
2024	(United States) (Minnesota)	Minnesota House of Representatives	District 54A	0.06384%	15	10,980	Incumbent Democratic-Farmer-Labor party candidate Brad Tabke beat Republican Aaron Paul by 15 votes after a recount that extended his margin by 1 vote. Paul sued because 21 absentee ballots were lost, claiming that the winner can not be known and asking for a special election. At a December 17 hearing, 6 voters whose ballots were lost said they voted for Tabke, meaning that there were not enough votes for Paul to overcome the deficit. In a January decision, Judge Tracy Perzel ruled that Tabke's election should stand. After initially indicating that they would block him from being seated, Republicans relented as part of a power sharing deal struck in February 2025.
2000	(United States) (New Mexico)	United States presidential	New Mexico	0.06385%	366	286,783	Since Florida's electoral votes decided George W. Bush's electoral college win over Al Gore, little attention was paid to the fact that New Mexico's outcome was even closer (in terms of raw vote) than the Florida result, this time with Gore coming out ahead.
2012	(United States) (New Mexico)	New Mexico House of Representatives	District 37	0.06386%	8	6,267	Two weeks after the election was over, the vote was still tied and went to a recount, which Republican Terry McMillan won by 8 votes. After another close loss in 2014, Democrat Joanne Ferrary defeated McMillan in 2016.
1916	(United States) (New Hampshire)	United States presidential	New Hampshire	0.06400%	56	43,781	Although the 0.38% victory margin for President Woodrow Wilson in California—which gave Wilson the thirteen electoral votes he needed to win reelection over Republican Charles Evans Hughes—garnered most of the attention, Wilson's surprise 56-vote victory over Hughes in New Hampshire (the only Northeastern state that Hughes did not carry) was the closest contest in the election.
2024	(New Hampshire)	New Hampshire House of Representatives	Strafford 4 District	0.06406%	16	4,200	Democratic incumbent Heath Howard defeated Republican challenger Kurt Wuelper for this district's third seat.
1828	(United States) (Maine)	United States House of Representatives	Maine's 5th District	0.0642%	3	2,495	In the September 1828 election, Reuel Washburn and James Ripley had 2,495–2,180 votes. But Maine law required that the winner have an absolute majority of the votes, i.e. 2,498 votes and so Washburn was 3 short. A new election was held in December 1828 and Ripley won a majority. There was some further wrangling but eventually Ripley was declared elected.
2004	(United States) (Ohio)	Ohio Senate Republican primary	14th District	0.06438%	22	17,098	Jean Schmidt won the first count by 62 votes, but Tom Niehaus prevailed in a recount and went on to win the general election.
2016	(United States) (New Mexico)	New Mexico House of Representatives	29th District	0.0645%	9	6,976	Republican Dave Adkins recaptured his spot in the New Mexico House over challenger Ronnie Martinez. The original count had him ahead by just two votes. However, a recount widened that lead to 9.
2016	(Philippines)	Philippine House of Representatives	Leyte's 3rd District	0.06466%	56	43,333	NUP's Vicente Veloso won an open seat contest against Liberal Tingting Salvacion, daughter of term-limited Andres Salvacion.
2018	(United States) (Idaho)	Idaho House of Representatives	District 9B	0.06475%	6	4,636	Following redistricting, Republican incumbent Scott Syme lost to another Republican incumbent, Judy Boyle.
2018	(United States) (Iowa)	Iowa House of Representatives	District 55	0.06503%	9	6,924	Republican incumbent Michael Bergan won the initial vote count over Democrat Kayla Koether by seven votes and the recount by nine. Koether contested the election, arguing that 29 of 33 disputed absentee ballots were wrongly rejected. The ballots were received on time, and the barcode proved they were mailed prior to the election, as required by law, but the barcode used on the disputed ballot differed from the postage stamp or “intelligent mail barcode" called for by the Iowa Code and administrative rules. After a district judge declined to decide if the ballots should be counted, Koether petitioned the Iowa House to settle the matter. On party-line votes in both the committee (3–2) and the Iowa House (53–42), legislators decided that the Iowa House did not have the legal authority to open and count the ballots.
1961	(Sultanate of Zanzibar)	Zanzibar general	Chake Chake	0.06502%	1	1,538	Khamis Masoud Khamis of the Afro-Shirazi Party (ASP) defeated Ahmad Abdulrahman Idarus of the Zanzibar Nationalist Party (ZNP) by one vote in Chake Chake, giving the ASP a 10–9 lead in what the Guinness Book of Records listed as the closest ever general election. Three other MPs split, leaving the 22-member assembly deadlocked between two 11-member blocs. Dissatisfaction with the electoral system precipitated the 1964 Zanzibar Revolution.
2018	(United States) (Minnesota)	Minnesota House of Representatives	District 5A	0.06510%	11	8,454	Democratic-Farmer-Labor party candidate John Persell beat incumbent Republican Representative Matt Bliss by 11 votes after a recount that extended his margin by 3 votes.
2006	(Italy)	Italian general	Chamber of Deputies	0.06518%	24,755	19,002,598	The centre-left coalition The Union led by Romano Prodi defeated the centre-right House of Freedoms of incumbent Prime Minister Silvio Berlusconi. Thus winning the majority bonus.
1971	(United States) (Virginia)	Virginia House of Delegates	District 23	0.0677%	27	19,958	Herbert N. Morgan (R) narrowly defeated H. Richard Chew (D)
2008	(Canada)	Canadian federal	Vancouver South	0.06833%	22	16,110	Liberal Ujjal Dosanjh defeated Conservative Wai Young after two recounts.
1832	(United States) (New York (state))	United States House of Representatives	New York's 18th District	0.06834%	6	4,393	Democrat Daniel Wardwell defeated Anti-Masonic candidate Daniel Lee by 6 votes: 4,393–4,387.
2004	(United States) (North Carolina)	North Carolina general	North Carolina Commissioner of Agriculture	0.06868%	2,287	1,666,197	Republican Steve Troxler defeated Democrat Britt Cobb. A failure by poll workers to change the memory card in a voting machine used for early voting in Carteret County led to the loss of 4,000 votes. The State Board of Elections voted 3–2 in favor of calling a new statewide election for the seat over calling a new election in Carteret County alone; 4 votes would have been required to take action on either option. In early December, the North Carolina Board of Elections ordered a new election for January 11, 2005, in Carteret County alone, for voters whose ballots had been lost or who had not voted in the November 2 election. Both candidates appealed the decision, Cobb arguing that a statewide revote should be held, Troxler arguing that a revote should be limited to those voters whose votes were lost. A Wake County superior court judge overturned this decision on December 17, calling it "arbitrary and capricious" and "contrary to law," requiring the State Board of Elections to revisit the issue. On December 29, the State Board of Elections ordered a new statewide election for the post. On January 13, 2005, the superior court invalidated this order as well, and sent the contest back to the Elections Board for resolution. Following this ruling, Cobb chose to concede defeat rather than continue a court battle with no clear way to resolve the issue. On February 4, the State Board of Elections officially certified Troxler as the winner of the 2004 election.
1992	(Japan)	Japanese House of Councillors	Okinawa at-large	0.069595%	341	245,159	OSMP's challenger Soko Shimabuku defeated LDP's incumbent Shinjun Oshiro by 341 votes.
2025	(Canada) (Ontario)	Ontario general	Burlington	0.0698%	39	24,118	Progressive Conservative candidate Natalie Pierre narrowly won by just 39 votes over Liberal candidate Andrea Grebenc.
1930	(United States) (Missouri)	United States House of Representatives	Missouri's 3rd District	0.0704%	46	32,669	According to the returns as originally certified, incumbent Jacob L. Milligan and challenger H. F. Lawrence had 32,665–32,626 votes. The recount of this precinct gave Milligan a clear majority of 46 votes, with the vote being 32,669–32,623.
2022	(United States) (Pennsylvania)	United States Pennsylvania Senate Republican primary	Pennsylvania	0.0704%	950	1,346,091	Television presenter Mehmet Oz narrowly beat David McCormick, Carla Sands, and Kathy Barnette in a heavily contested multi-way primary after a recount.
1952	(United States) (Kentucky)	United States presidential	Kentucky	0.07065%	700	495,729	Dwight Eisenhower was elected president in a landslide, but lost Kentucky by the smallest margin of any state Presidential battle for thirty-six years, giving a sixth straight Democratic win in the Bluegrass State.
2025	(India) (Uttarakhand)	Pithoragarh mayoral election	Pithoragarh	0.070674%	17	9,466	BJP candidate Kalpana Deolal won a narrow plurality defeating independent candidate and Indian National Congress rebel Monika Mahar by 17 votes in an election marked with political defections and rebellion, in which there were at least 4 rebel candidates. Out of a total of 24,054 ballots cast, the number of spoiled ballots (134) exceeded the narrow victory margin by nearly eight times. Interestingly, every candidate in the election including None of the above (which received 125), exceeded the winning margin.
2024	(Iowa)	Iowa Senate	Senate District 14	0.07079%	29	20,467	Democratic incumbent Sarah Trone Garriott defeated Republican challenger Mark Hanson.
1974	(United Kingdom)	United Kingdom general	East Dunbartonshire	0.071%	22	15,551	In a three-way race, SNP challenger Margaret Bain defeated Conservative Party incumbent Barry Henderson 15,551–15,529. (Labour Party Edward McGarry candidate had 15,122 votes.) Henderson had defeated both Bain and McGarry earlier in the Feb 1974 election.
2021	(Japan)	Japanese general	Niigata 6th	0.071062%	130	90,679	CDP's challenger Mamoru Umetani defeated LDP's incumbent Shuichi Takatori by 130 votes.
2002	(United States) (Massachusetts)	Massachusetts House of Representatives	18th Worcester	0.0714%	4	2,803	Jennifer Callahan defeated Robert Dubois by 4 votes and then went on to win the seat. She lost re-election in 2010 and DuBois won nomination for the seat in 2012. He lose in the general.
2014	(United States) (Massachusetts)	Massachusetts House of Representatives	1st Essex	0.0717%	10	6,978	James M. Kelcourse (R) defeated Edward C. Cameron (D).
2021	(Japan)	Japanese general	Saga 1st	0.071981%	133	92,452	CDP's incumbent Kazuhiro Haraguchi defeated LDP's challenger Kazuchika Iwata by 133 votes.
2020	(Australia) (Northern Territory)	Northern Territory general election	Electoral division of Barkly	0.0727%	5	3,441	The sitting member, Gerry McCarthy, resigned and while the Labor candidate was ahead on the night, Country Liberal candidate Steve Edgington pulled ahead by 5 votes on postal votes making it the first time since 1990 that Labor had not held the seat.
1959	(Singapore)	Singaporean general	River Valley	0.07294%	5	3,430	People's Action Party candidate Lim Cheng Lock defeated Soh Ghee Soon of the Singapore People's Alliance.
2014	(United States) (Arizona)	United States House of Representatives	Arizona's 2nd district	0.07343%	161	109,704	Martha McSally defeated Ron Barber, officially announced a month after the election, after a legally mandated recount. McSally had lost to Barber in 2012 by 2,454 votes.
1919	(United States) (Maryland)	Maryland gubernatorial	Governor of Maryland	0.0735%	165	112,240	After several days of vote counting, Albert Ritchie was declared the winner over Harry Nice, 112,240 votes to 112,075. Ritchie would serve four terms as Governor, but would be defeated in 1934 by Nice, who won by 6,149.
1870	(United States) (Kentucky)	United States House of Representatives	Kentucky's 8th District	0.0737%	18	12,226	Democrat incumbent George M. Adams defeated Republican challenger Hugh F. Finley by 18 votes: 12,226–12,208.
2016	(United States) (Pennsylvania)	Pennsylvania House of Representatives	District 31	0.07381%	28	18,982	Democrat Perry Warren defeated Republican Ryan Gallagher for District 31 of the PA House of Representatives.
2002	(United States) (Colorado)	United States House of Representatives	Colorado's 7th district	0.07403%	121	81,789	In the first race in this newly created Congressional district, Republican Bob Beauprez narrowly beat out Democrat Mike Feeley.
1940	(Canada)	Canadian federal	Cumberland	0.07438%	12	8,073	Incumbent National Government MP Percy Chapman Black defeated Liberal Kenneth Judson Cochrane.
1923	(United Kingdom)	United Kingdom general	Huddersfield	0.0746%	26	17,430	Labour Party candidate James Hudson defeated Liberal Party candidate Arthur Marshall 17,430–17,404. (In this three-way race, Conservative Party C. Tinker won 12,694 votes.) In the previous year's General Election (1922), Marshall had narrowly beaten Hudson by a 0.5% margin.
1988	(Canada)	Canadian federal	Northumberland, Ontario	0.07533%	28	18,600	Liberal candidate Christine Stewart narrowly edged out Progressive Conservative Reg Jewell.
2018	(United States) (Florida)	Florida general	Commissioner of Agriculture	0.07535%	6,753	4,032,954	After a recount, Democrat Nikki Fried defeated Republican Matt Caldwell.
1987	(United States) (Virginia)	Virginia Senate	District 39	0.0755%	35	21,217	William C. Wampler Jr. (R) defeated John S. Bundy (D) by 32 votes and a December 15, 1987 recount widened the margin by 3 more votes.
2006	(Canada)	Canadian federal	Parry Sound-Muskoka	0.0756%	28	18,513	Conservative candidate Tony Clement narrowly edged out Liberal MP Andy Mitchell.
1916	(United States) (Arizona)	Arizona gubernatorial	Governor of Arizona	0.0766%	43	28,094	The initial count had Thomas Campbell up by 30 votes. George Hunt, the incumbent, contested; but before that could be settled his term expired. The courts then allowed Campbell to take office as de facto Governor in January 1917. After losing a case in the county court and winning at the state Supreme Court, Hunt became governor in December 1917, with the courts deciding he'd won by 43 votes. Had the initial count stood this race would have been even closer, with the margin just 0.0536%.
1974	(United States) (North Dakota)	United States Senate	North Dakota	0.0771%	177	114,852	Five-term Republican U.S. Senator Milton Young defeated former Democratic Governor William Guy by 177 votes out of 237,000 cast.
1990	(United States) (Massachusetts)	Massachusetts House of Representatives	7th Worcester	0.0780%	13	8,341	Democrat Paul Kollios defeated Independent Alan M. Tuttle.
2022	(United States) (New Hampshire)	New Hampshire House of Representatives	Hillsborough 45 District	0.0783%	7	4,474	Democrat Karen Calabro defeated Republican Colton Skorupan.
1981	(United States) (New Jersey)	New Jersey gubernatorial	Governor of New Jersey	0.0784%	1,797	1,145,999	The results of the initial ballot counting was close with Kean leading Florio by 1,677 votes. A recount took place over the next month and Kean was certified the winner besting Florio by 1,797 votes out of over 2.3 million votes cast.
1922	(United Kingdom)	United Kingdom general	South Shields	0.0794%	25	15,760	In this three-way race, Liberal Party candidate Edward Harney defeated Labour Party William Lawther 15,760–15,735.
2013	(United States) (New Jersey)	New Jersey General Assembly	District 2	0.07954%	40	25,164	Democrat Vince Mazzeo defeated incumbent Republican John F. Amodeo after a recount.
2024	(Illinois)	Illinois House of Representatives	House District 52	0.07967%	47	29,520	Republican incumbent Martin McLaughlin defeated Democratic challenger Maria Peterson.
2024	(New Hampshire)	New Hampshire House of Representatives	Hillsborough 12 District	0.07973%	95	7,479	Democratic incumbent Wendy Thomas defeated Republican challenger John Frechette for this district's eighth seat.
1922	(United Kingdom)	United Kingdom general	Derbyshire, North-Eastern	0.0802%	15	9,359	In this three-way race, Labour Party candidate Frank Lee defeated Liberal Party candidate Joseph Stanley Holmes 9,359–9,344.
1922	(United States) (Delaware)	United States Senate	Delaware	0.0812%	60	36,954	Democratic attorney Thomas Bayard defeated appointed U.S. Senator T. Coleman DuPont by 60 votes out of 74K+ votes cast in a special election. Bayard simultaneously defeated DuPont by 0.43 points in the election to the seat for the unexpired six-year term.
2015	(Argentina) (Santa Fe Province)	Santa Fe gubernatorial	Governor of Santa Fe	0.0813%	1,496	584,017	Miguel Lifschitz (584,017 votes) defeated Miguel del Sel (582,521 votes) and Omar Perotti (558,571 votes).
1990	(United States) (New Hampshire)	New Hampshire House of Representatives	Hillsborough 40 District	0.0818%	4	2,448	Robert Murphy (D) defeated Kathleen Souza (R) by 4 votes.
2018	(United States) (Illinois)	Illinois House of Representatives	54th District	0.0823%	37	22,484	Tom Morrison (R) defeated Maggie Trevor (D) by 37 votes.
2012	(Japan)	Japanese general	Saitama 6th	0.08266%	198	90,871	LDP's challenger Kazuyuki Nakane defeated DPJ's incumbent Atsushi Oshima by 198 votes.
1916	(United States) (Michigan)	United States House of Representatives	Michigan's 2nd District	0.0868%	46	26,530	The initial count for this House seat gave the win to Republican Mark R. Bacon by a margin of 49 votes. However his opponent, Democrat Samuel Beakes, discovered that canvassers had failed to include more than 70 ballots and those ballots were then counted which gave Beakes the lead by 46 votes. Bacon argued that the ballot boxes were not safely preserved and so any new ballots should be considered void. The local and state election boards felt unable to rule and the State Supreme Court was unwilling to call for a recount, so Beakes contested the election in the House where Bacon had been seated. The Democrat-controlled House, which had a 3-seat majority at the time, ruled that the new ballots should be counted and they replaced Bacon with Beakes.
1922	(United Kingdom)	United Kingdom general	Salford, North	0.0836%	19	11,368	In this three-way race, Labour Party incumbent Ben Tillett defeated Conservative Party challenger Samuel Finburgh 11,368–11,349. Tillett face Finbburgh again in the 1923 and 1924 General Elections, winning in 1923 but losing in 1924.
2024	(Arizona)	Arizona House of Representatives	House District 2	0.08381%	132	46,943	Incumbent Republican Justin Wilmeth defeated fellow Republican Ari Bradshaw for this district's second seat.
1984	(United States) (Idaho)	United States House of Representatives	Idaho's 2nd District	0.08399%	170	7,637	The first count showed that Richard H. Stallings had defeated the incumbent Republican George V. Hansen by 133 votes. A partial recount upped that margin to 170. Hansen, who in the spring prior to the election had been convicted of filing false financial disclosure statements, contested the election arguing that illegally registered voters were allowed to vote and that he was denied a full recount. A review by the Idaho Attorney General determined that no unqualified persons voted and that the partial recount did not show enough material differences for a full recount to change the outcome, so the House dismissed his contest.
1972	(Canada)	Canadian federal	Selkirk	0.08400%	30	17,872	New Democrat incumbent Doug Rowland defeated Progressive Conservative Dean Whiteway.
1966	(United States) (Massachusetts)	Massachusetts House of Representatives	2nd Bristol	0.08436%	28	16,609	Democrat Edward P. Coury defeated fellow Democrat Ronald Anthony Pina.
1924	(United States) (Iowa)	United States Senate	Iowa	0.08439%	755	447,706	Smith Brookhart won the election by 755 votes and was initially seated in the Senate without incident. After Brookhart was seated, Steck contested the election results. The investigation and recount took longer than a year, but on April 12, 1926, by a vote of 45–41, the Senate overturned the election results and gave the seat to Steck. This was the first time the Senate voted to overturn an election after the winner was seated. The recount was contentious with claims of fraud and destroyed ballots, and with the special subcommittee inspecting each discarded ballot to determine voter intent. In the end the fact that Democrats wanted Steck elected and Republicans wanted to punish Brookhart for failing to support Coolidge, partisan politics likely did him in.
1974	(United States) (Massachusetts)	Massachusetts House of Representatives Democratic Primary	41st Middlesex	0.08443%	3	1,778	Frank A. Antonelli topped Joseph Whelan by three votes and then lost the general election. He would win the nomination two more times and seek it two more than that, but never win the seat.
1978	(United States) (South Dakota)	United States House of Representatives	South Dakota's 1st District	0.08512%	110	64,683	Democrat Tom Daschle looked to have lost on election night, but an official canvas gave him a 6-vote margin. The final tally gave him a 14-vote lead and a recount increased that to 105. Daschle was seated and his opponent Leo Thorsness appealed the recount in state court. A review of 1,084 contested ballots increased Daschle's lead to 110 votes, though a final count of the vote was not reported. Thorsness then contested the election in the House, but the case was dismissed as the House was satisfied with the count of the Iowa court and found no grounds to change the results.
2015	(United Kingdom)	United Kingdom general	Gower	0.08518%	27	15,862	Labour candidate Liz Evans was defeated by the Conservative Byron Davies by 27 votes, less than 0.1% of votes cast, which made it the most marginal Conservative seat going into the next election. Davies' victory brought 105 consecutive years of Labour representation to an end, but Labour won the seat back in the 2017 general election with a majority of 3,269.
1858	(United States) (New York (state))	United States House of Representatives	New York's 9th District	0.0852%	13	7,637	Anti-Administration Democrat John B. Haskin defeated Democrat Gouverneur Kemble, 7,637–7,624. A third candidate Edward A. Andrews won 545 votes.
1998	(United States) (Massachusetts)	Massachusetts House of Representatives	1st Plymouth	0.0858%	11	6,417	Republican Vinny M. deMacedo defeated Democrat Joseph R. Gallitano.
2018	(Pakistan)	Pakistani general	Kasur-IV	0.0860%	249	124,644	Pakistan Tehreek-e-Insaf's Talib Hassan Nakai defeated Pakistan Muslim League-N's Rana Muhammad Hayat 124,644-124,395.
2002	(Brazil) (Ceará)	Ceará gubernatorial	Governor of Ceará	0.0863%	3,047	1,765,726	PSDB's Lúcio Alcântara defeated PT's José Airton 1,765,726-1,762,679.
2023	(Japan)	Japanese House of Councillors by-election	Ōita at-large	0.087011%	341	196,122	LDP's candidate Aki Shirasaka defeated CDP's candidate Tadatomo Yoshida by 341 votes.
2018	(United States) (Missouri)	Missouri House of Representatives Republican primary	102	0.0877%	4	2,282	Ron Hicks defeated Bryan Cooper.
2022	(United States) (Iowa)	Iowa House of Representatives	20	0.088%	6	3,403	Democrat Joshua Turek defeated Republican Sarag Abdouch.
2000	(Canada)	Canadian federal	Laval Centre	0.08851%	42	23,746	Bloc Québécois MP Madeleine Dalphond-Guiral narrowly edged out Liberal Pierre Lafleur.
2024	(United States) (California)	United States House of Representatives	California's 13th district	0.0887%	187	105,554	Democrat Adam Gray defeated incumbent Republican John Duarte.
2012	(France)	French legislative	Eure second constituency	0.08928%	39	21,860	Socialist Jean-Louis Destans defeated incumbent Jean-Pierre Nicolas
1846	(United States) (New Jersey)	United States House of Representatives	New Jersey's 3rd District	0.0895%	16	8,942	John Runk and Isaac G. Farlee 8,942–8,926 votes. There was a dispute over whether some 36 Princeton students' votes were legal due to residency. The majority of the committee investigating the contest chose to consider them as residents and the minority that they were not, which they estimated would have given Farlee the win by 3 votes. The full House voted that Farlee was ineligible and then voted on a resolution to remove Runk too and declare the seat vacant. The vote on Runk was a tie, broken by the Speaker in Runk's favor.
1880	(United States) (California)	United States presidential	California	0.08960%	144	80,426	Democrat Winfield Scott Hancock took advantage of the opposition to Chinese immigration for the first Democratic win in California since 1856, but narrowly lost the electoral vote and the popular vote to Garfield. The US presidential election is not decided by popular vote, but Garfield won the national popular vote by only 1,898 votes or 0.0213%. (Note: There is considerable disagreement among historians about the exact vote totals. As Kenneth Ackerman explained in his 2003 book: "Because (a) voting was decentralized, (b) states certified electoral votes, not popular votes as 'official', and (c) Democratic votes were divided among various splinter groups, there remains today a range of published 'final results' for the 1880 presidential popular vote." The federal government lists the margin of victory as 1,898, which is used in this article. Others give the margin as 7,018; 7,368; 9,070; or 9,457 among others.)
1908	(United States) (Missouri)	United States presidential	Missouri	0.09066%	629	347,203	William Howard Taft wins a comfortable first term but takes Missouri by fewer than a thousand votes.
1932	(United States) (Connecticut)	United States House of Representatives	Connecticut's 5th District	0.0926%	78	42,132	Republican Edward W. Goss defeated his challenger Martin Gormley by 78 votes. Gormley challenged the election in the House of Representatives arguing that "fraud, irregularities, corruption, and deceit" at a voting booth in Waterbury had cost him the votes to win. The House investigation showed confusion at the polling place, but no recorded complaints and inadequate evidence to overturn the election.
2000	(United States) (Washington (state))	United States Senate	Washington	0.09301%	2,229	1,199,437	Democrat Maria Cantwell unseated Republican Slade Gorton following a mandatory recount.
1961	(United States) (Virginia)	Virginia House of Delegates	District 66	0.09323%	5	2,684	James B. Fugate (D) defeated Dr. Conley E. Greear (R). The initial count showed the two tied. But two recounts put Fugate up by 5.
2018	(Italy)	Italian Senate	Ancona	0.09328%	264	93,601	M5S candidate Mauro Coltorti defeated CDX candidate Giuliano Pazzaglini.
1860	(United States) (Virginia)	United States presidential	Virginia	0.09347%	156	74,481	In a four-way race, Constitutional Union candidate John Bell defeated Southern Democrat John C. Breckinridge, 74,481–74,325, with a further 18,085 votes split between Democrat Stephen A. Douglas and Republican Abraham Lincoln. However, Lincoln won the Electoral College.
1874	(Canada)	Canadian federal	Leeds South	0.09372%	3	1,602	Conservative David Ford Jones beat challenger W. H. Fredenburgh.
1835	(United States) (North Carolina)	United States House of Representatives	North Carolina's 12th District	0.0938%	7	3,733	Anti-Jacksonian James Graham defeated National Republican David Newland by 7 votes. Newland contested the race and a review of ballots by the House gave the election to Newland by 12 votes, but the House ignored the committee's recommendation to replace Graham with Newland and voted 100–99 to instead vacate the seat. A special election was held in the summer of 1836 which Graham won easily.
1976	(United States) (Illinois)	United States House of Representatives	Illinois's 10th District	0.0941%	201	106,804	Democrat Abner V. Mikva was declared the winner by 201 votes. Following a discovery recount and the failure to get a judicial recount, Republican Samuel H. Young contested the election arguing that there were election irregularities or errors. The Committee on House Administration decided that there Young had failed to provide sufficient evidence to support his claims and awarded the seat to Mikva. The election was a rematch of the 1974 race, and in that race Young had also contested the election to the House claiming fraud and violations of the law and that case was also dismissed for lack of evidence.
1848	(United States) (Ohio)	United States House of Representatives	Ohio's 10th District	0.0947%	16	8,454	Democrat Charles Sweetzer defeated Whig Daniel Duncan 8,454–8,438.
1962	(Canada)	Canadian federal	St. John's West	0.09495%	24	12,650	Liberal Richard Cashin defeated Progressive Conservative incumbent William Joseph Browne.
1857	(United States) (Connecticut)	United States House of Representatives	Connecticut's 4th District	0.0953%	16	8,403	Democrat William D. Bishop defeated a Republican named Orris S. Ferry 8403–8387.
1923	(United Kingdom)	United Kingdom general	Hertfordshire, Hemel Hempstead	0.0956%	17	8,892	Liberal Party challenger John Freeman Dunn defeated Conservative Party incumbent J C C Davidson 8,892–8,875. Dunn would regain the seat in 1924.
1956	(United States) (Maine)	United States House of Representatives	Maine's 1st District	0.0957%	111	58,024	In the initial count Republican Robert Hale won the race by 29 votes. A recount was held in which more than 4,000 ballots were disputed. Hale sued for a certificate, which the Governor first refused and then issued after asking the Supreme Court of Maine for decisions on matters of law. James Oliver, his opponent, then contested the election in the House. After a review of the disputed ballots, the House Committee ruled that Hale had won by a vote of 58,024-57,913.
1922	(United Kingdom)	United Kingdom general	Nottingham, Central	0.0959%	22	11,481	Liberal Party candidate Reginald Berkeley defeated Conservative Party incumbent Albert Atkey 11,481–11,459. Berkeley was later and briefly a Hollywood screenwriter.
1998	(United States) (Nevada)	United States Senate	Nevada	0.0961%	401	208,621	Democratic incumbent Harry Reid defeated Republican John Ensign who did not contest the results.
2000	(United States) (Montana)	Montana Democratic primary	Montana Superintendent of Public Instruction	0.09650%	61	31,634	In this 3-way race, the initial tally for Linda McCulloch, Gail Gray, and Mike Schwinden was 31,572–31,508–28,739. Gray requested a recount and McCulloch still won by 61 votes: 31,634–31,573–28,765 votes. McCulloch would also go on to win the general election.
1839	(United States) (Virginia)	United States House of Representatives	Virginia's 15th District	0.09652%	4	2,074	Democrat William Lucas defeated Whig Richard Barton 2,074–2,070.
1984	(Canada)	Canadian federal	Renfrew—Nipissing—Pembroke	0.09752%	38	19,502	Liberal MP Len Hopkins narrowly edged out Progressive Conservative Don Whillans.
2020	(United States) (California)	United States House of Representatives	California's 25th District	0.0982%	333	169,638	Republican Mike Garcia defeated Democrat Christy Smith by 333 votes. On election day, Smith appeared to be up by 1,287 votes but by the next day she was down by 157 votes. Further vote drops extended Garcia's lead and at the end of the month, Smith conceded.
2002	(United States) (Massachusetts)	Massachusetts House of Representatives	3rd Barnstable	0.0983%	17	8,655	Democrat Matthew C. Patrick defeated Republican Larry F. Wheatley.
1884	(United States) (New York (state))	United States presidential	New York	0.09844%	1,149	563,154	Democrat Grover Cleveland won his home state by less than 1,200 votes to earn New York's 36 electoral votes and clinch an Electoral College victory of 219–182. A swing of less than 0.1% would have made Republican James G. Blaine president with an Electoral College tally of 218–183.
2024	(Kansas)	Kansas Senate	Senate District 5	0.09862%	31	15,732	Republican nominee Jeff Klemp defeated Democratic incumbent Jeff Pittman.
1878	(Canada)	Canadian federal	Jacques Cartier	0.09911%	2	1,010	Conservative Désiré Girouard defeated Liberal incumbent Rodolphe Laflamme.
1894	(Netherlands)	Dutch general (2nd round)	Beverwijk	0.09944%	3	1,510	Catholic incumbent T.L.M.H. Borret defeated Liberal J. van Loenen Martinet.
1852	(United States) (New York (state))	United States House of Representatives	New York's 26th District	0.09956%	17	8,546	Democrat Andrew Oliver defeated the Whig candidate, James H. Woods, 8,546–8,529.
2017	(France)	French legislative (2nd round)	Loire's 1st constituency	0.09972%	23	11,544	Régis Juanico of the Socialist Party (PS), a supporter of Benoît Hamon, held onto his seat narrowly against Magalie Viallon, candidate of La République En Marche! (REM).

=== List of close election results between candidates in the first round of a two-round election ===
Year	Country / region	Election	District/race	Margin (%)	Margin (votes)	Total votes cast for higher-placed candidate	Description
2026	(Czech Republic)	2026 Czech Senate election	Senate district 51 – Žďár nad Sázavou	0.0023%	1	11,373	Incumbent KDU-ČSL senator Josef Klement placed second and advanced to the second round of the election by a margin of one vote ahead of Civic Democratic Party candidate Radek Černý. In a repeat of the second round matchup of 2020, Klement subsequently beat Volt-nominated Michal Šmarda by 8% of the vote. On 18 November 2026, a repeat of the election was ordered by the Supreme Administrative Court, after irregularities were found that affected the outcome of the election.
1962	(United States) (Alabama)	1962 Alabama Senate election	District 22 special Democratic primary (Note: While the election was held to select nominees for a general election, it is considered to be a special election as it was made necessary by late-term redistricting that took place after the regularly-scheduled Democratic primaries.)	0.0222%	1	1,047	The first round of the special Democratic primary saw state representative Rush "Doc" Smith beat out Roy H. Coshatt for the second-place spot in the runoff by a single vote. After the results were made official, Coshatt contested the election results, but his case was thrown out by the state Democratic executive committee, allowing Smith to advance to the September runoff. Smith lost the runoff by 442 votes to radio executive L. D. Bentley.
2024	(Romania)	Romanian presidential	President of Romania	0.0297%	2,742	1,769,761	Prime minister Marcel Ciolacu was narrowly defeated by Elena Lasconi who went on to face the nationalist Călin Georgescu in a run-off. Ciolacu was ahead until 99.91% of the votes were counted. This was the first time since 2000 that a nationalist candidate made it into the second round instead of either the National Liberals nor the now defunct Democratic Liberal Party. It is also first time in the post-communist period that Social Democrats failed to reach the run-off. The run-off was eventually cancelled.
2022	(Brazil) (Rio Grande do Sul)	2022 Rio Grande do Sul gubernatorial election	Governor of Rio Grande do Sul	0.0384%	2,441	1,702,815	PT candidate Edegar Pretto was narrowly defeated by incumbent governor Eduardo Leite who went on to face the pro-government candidate Onyx Lorenzoni. Leite ended up winning the election and was reelected.

=== List of close election results between parties passing the threshold in party-list proportional races ===
Year	Country / region	Election	Legislature	District/race	Margin (%)	Margin (votes)	Total votes cast for higher-placed party	Description
1992	(Czechoslovakia) (Czech Republic)	Czech legislative	Czech National Council	Statewide results	0.05%	3,321	387,026	Statewide, the far-right Rally for the Republic – Republican Party of Czechoslovakia (SPR–RSČ, sixth place), and center-right Civic Democratic Alliance (ODA) were only 0.05% apart while Movement for Autonomous Democracy–Party for Moravia and Silesia (HSD–SMS) was only 0.06% behind ODA.
1992	(Czechoslovakia) (Czech Republic)	Czech legislative	Czech National Council	Statewide results	0.06%	3,617	383,705	Statewide, the far-right Rally for the Republic – Republican Party of Czechoslovakia (SPR–RSČ, sixth place), and center-right Civic Democratic Alliance (ODA) were only 0.05% apart while Movement for Autonomous Democracy–Party for Moravia and Silesia (HSD–SMS) was only 0.06% behind ODA.
1996	(Czech Republic)	Czech legislative	Chamber of Deputies	National results	0.07%	4,277	489,349	Nationally, the centrist Christian and Democratic Union – Czechoslovak People's Party and the far-right Rally for the Republic – Republican Party of Czechoslovakia were only 0.07% apart.
1999	(Austria)	Austria legislative	National Council	National results	0.0167%	415	1,244,087	Nationally, the far-right Freedom Party of Austria (FPÖ, second place) and the center-right Austrian People's Party (ÖVP, third place) were only 415 votes apart. They won 52 seats each in the 183-seat national council. This is significant as the two parties had enough seats to form a majority coalition government on their own. The traditional rule is that the Chancellor comes from the largest party in the coalition, but since the FPÖ and ÖVP each had an equal number of seats, the ranking between them had to be decided based on the popular vote – which would mean a Chancellor from the far-right, which drew domestic and international controversy. Eventually, an FPÖ-ÖVP coalition government was formed, but under an ÖVP Chancellor.
2004	(European Union) (Cyprus)	European Parliament	European Parliament	Cyprus	0.0111%	37	36,112	Due to the traditional size of the parties, all European elections ended up with the seat ratio 2-2-1-1. In this election, For Europe managed to win the last seat instead of EDEK with just 37 votes.
2017	(Argentina) (La Pampa Province)	Argentina legislative	Chamber of Deputies	La Pampa	0.0395%	76	96,121	The first-placed Justicialist Party won 96,121 votes to second-placed Cambiemos' 96,045. The Justicialist Party won 2 Deputies and Cambiemos 1 Deputy.
2018	(Germany) (Hesse)	Hesse state	Landtag	State results	0.002%	66	570,512	Grüne narrowly topped the SPD, leading to the failure of negotiations for a potential traffic light coalition, as the FDP vowed to only join a government led by the SPD, but not by Grüne.
2021	(Liechtenstein)	Liechtenstein legislative	Landtag	Liechtenstein	0.021%	42	72,361	The Patriotic Union (VU) narrowly defeated the Progressive Citizens' Party (FBP), with VU's candidate Daniel Risch becoming new Prime Minister.
2023	(Germany) (Berlin)	Berlin state	Abgeordnetenhaus	State results	0.003%	53	279,017	The SPD of incumbent mayor Franziska Giffey got slightly more votes than Grüne led by Bettina Jarasch destroying their chances of forming a Green-led government.

=== List of parties close to the threshold in proportional races ===
Year	Country / region	Election	Legislature	District/race	Party	Votes (%)	Votes (#)	Electoral threshold in percentage	Electoral threshold in votes	Margin (%)	Margin (votes)	Description
2010	(Slovakia)	Slovak parliamentary	National Council	National results	Slovak National Party	5.08%	128,908	5%	126,470	0.08%	2,438	SNS narrowly crosses 5% threshold.
2024	(European Union) (Romania)	European Parliament	European Parliament	Romania	Nicu Ștefănuță	3.08%	275,228	3.03%	270,727	0.05%	4,501	Ștefănuță crosses the threshold (1/33) by 0.05%.
1990	(Germany) (North Rhine-Westphalia)	North Rhine-Westphalia state	Landtag of North Rhine-Westphalia	Statewide results	The Greens	5.05%	469,098	5%	464,599	0.05%	4,499	Grüne narrowly passed the threshold by 0.05%
1973	(Israel)	Israeli legislative election	Knesset	National results	Arab List for Bedouin and Villagers	1.05%	16,408	1%	15,669	0.05%	739	The list narrowly crosses threshold.
2019	(Germany) (Brandenburg)	Brandenburg state parliament	Landtag of Brandenburg	Statewide results	Brandenburg United Civic Movements/Free Voters	5.05%	63,851	5%	63,256	0.05%	595	BVB/FW narrowly crosses threshold.
2006	(Hungary)	Hungarian parliamentary	Országgyűlés	National results	Hungarian Democratic Forum	5.04%	272,831	5%	270,403	0.04%	2,428	MDF narrowly crossed the threshold.
2016	(Serbia)	Serbian parliamentary	National Assembly	National results	Dveri–Democratic Party of Serbia	5.04%	190,530	5%	188,947	0.04%	1,583	Dveri–DSS narrowly crossed the threshold.
2024	(European Union) (Greece)	European Parliament	European Parliament	Greece	Voice of Reason	3.04%	120,753	3%	119,283	0.04%	1,470	FL narrowly crossed the threshold.
1988	(Denmark)	Danish general	Folketing	National results	Christian People's Party	2.04%	68,047	2%	66,583	0.04%	1,464	KF narrowly crossed the threshold.
2014	(European Union) (Hungary)	European Parliament	European Parliament	Hungary	Politics Can Be Different	5.04%	116,904	5%	115,975	0.04%	929	LMP wins one MEP.
2008	(Lithuania)	Lithuanian parliamentary	Seimas	National results	Liberal and Centre Union	5.04%	66,078	5%	65,499	0.04%	579	LiCS crosses the threshold by less than 600 votes.
2012	(Germany) (Saarland)	Saarland state parliament	Landtag of Saarland	Statewide results	Alliance 90/The Greens	5.04%	24,252	5%	24,065	0.04%	187	Greens narrowly crossed the threshold.
2014	(European Union) (Italy)	European Parliament	European Parliament	Italy	The Other Europe	5.03%	1,108,457	4%	1,097,957	0.03%	10,500	It was the only time as of 2019, that a left-wing coalition was able to win a MEP since the introduction of the 4% threshold.
1992	(Romania)	Romanian general	Chamber of Deputies	National results	Socialist Party of Labour	3.03%	328,283	3%	324,766	0.03%	3,517	With the PSM, the "Red Quadrilateral" gained a majority of 5 seats in the Chamber.
2024	(European Union) (Romania)	European Parliament	European Parliament	Romania	S.O.S. Romania	5.03%	450,040	5%	446,700	0.04%	3,340	S.O.S. Romania crosses the threshold.
2023	(Germany) (Hesse)	Hessian state	Landtag of Hesse	Statewide results	Free Democratic Party	5.03%	141,608	5%	140,628	0.03%	980	FDP narrowly passed the threshold by 0.03%.
2013	(Germany) (Hesse)	Hessian state	Landtag of Hesse	Statewide results	Free Democratic Party	5.03%	157,451	5%	156,540	0.03%	911	FDP narrowly passed the threshold by 0.03%
2016	(Serbia)	Serbian parliamentary	National Assembly	National results	Alliance for a Better Serbia	5.02%	189,564	5%	188,947	0.02%	617	CZBS narrowly crossed the threshold.
2024	(Lithuania)	Lithuanian parliamentary	Seimas	National results	Lithuanian Farmers and Greens Union	7.02%	87,182	7%	86,893	0.02%	289	LVŽS narrowly crosses threshold for coalitions.
2023	(Italy) (Friuli-Venezia Giulia)	Friuli-Venezia Giulia regional	Regional Council of Friuli-Venezia Giulia	Statewide results	Slovene Union	1.02%	4,016	1%	3,950	0.02%	66	SSk narrowly crosses threshold for linguistic minorities.
2016	(Georgia (country))	Georgian parliamentary	Parliament	National results	Alliance of Patriots of Georgia	5.01%	88,097	5%	87,982	0.01%	116	APG narrowly crossed the threshold.
2019	(Germany) (Thuringia)	Thuringia state parliament	Landtag of Thuringia	Statewide results	Free Democratic Party	5.01%	55,493	5%	55,420	0.01%	73	FDP narrowly crosses threshold, later forms 28-day government.
2023	(Italy) (Friuli-Venezia Giulia)	Friuli-Venezia Giulia regional	Regional Council of Friuli-Venezia Giulia	Statewide results	Open – Left FVG	1.51%	5,957	1.5%	5,925	0.01%	32	OPEN narrowly crosses threshold for parties inside of coalitions.
2026	(Bosnia and Herzegovina) (Canton 10)	Canton 10 parliamentary	Assembly	Cantonwide results	SNP FBiH	3.008%	740	3%	739	0.008%	1	Originally the party was thought to have missed the threshold by one vote. The SNSD lost a seat to them.
2024	(Bulgaria)	Bulgarian parliamentary	National Assembly	National results	Velichie	4.004%	97,497	4%	97,391	0.004%	106	Velichie narrowly missed the threshold in the original count with just 36 votes. During the first vote count, the party passed the threshold, until the very last count update.
1968	(Denmark)	Danish general	Folketing	National results	Left Socialists	2.003%	57,184	2%	57,093	0.003%	91	Left Socialists narrowly crossed the threshold in their first election.
2020	(Georgia (country))	Georgian parliamentary	Parliament	National results	Georgian Labour Party	1.003%	19,314	1%	19,244	0.003%	70	Georgian Labour Party narrowly crosses threshold but withdrew from parliament later.
2018	(Bosnia and Herzegovina) (Federation of Bosnia and Herzegovina)	Bosnian general	House of Representatives	Federation of Bosnia and Herzegovina	Party of Democratic Activity	3.001%	29,726	3%	29,676	0.001%	50	The Party of Democratic Activity (A-SDA) had already won enough votes for a direct seat in their district, however if they had not done so, they would have been awarded a compensational seat and still be represented in the House of Representatives.
2010	(Austria) (Burgenland)	Burgenland state	Landtag	Statewide results	List Burgenland	4.00032%	7,559	4%	7,559	0.00032%	0	The party passed the threshold by a single vote. Though this result is controversial, since it was later admitted by ÖVP Landtag member and mayor of Unterrabnitz-Schwendgraben Wilhelm Heißenberger, that twelve votes in his municipality were manipulated, and it is believed that these twelve votes came advantageous for List Burgenland. Demands for a reelection were dismissied.
2020	(Czech Republic) (Vysočina Region)	Vysočina regional	Regional Council of Vysočina	Regional results	Pro TOP Vysočinu	4.99978%	7,972	5%	7,973	-0.00022%	-1	Coalition of TOP 09, KAN and Koruna Česká narrowly missed 5% threshold by a single vote.
1959	(Netherlands)	Dutch general	Second Chamber	National results	Reformed Political League	0.6624%	39,972	0.6667%	39,998	-0.00043%	-26	The party initially had enough votes to get into the Tweede Kamer and the leader of the party, L.P. Laning, met with the Dutch Queen Juliana to discuss forming the government a day after the election. However, the party was ultimately 26 votes short, and its seat awarded to the PvdA.
2019	(European Union) (Greece)	European Parliament	European Parliament	Greece	MeRA25	2.999%	169,635	3%	169,684	-0.001%	-49	MeRA25 narrowly missed the threshold making their European party DiEM25 unrepresented in the European Parliament.
2022	(Germany) (Saarland)	Saarland state parliament	Landtag of Saarland	Statewide results	Alliance 90/The Greens	4.995%	22,598	5%	22,621	-0.005%	-23	Greens narrowly missed the threshold by 0.005%.
1967	(Netherlands)	Dutch general	Second Chamber	National results	The Emergency Council	0.6604%	45,421	0.6667%	45,854	-0.0063%	-433	The Emergency Council narrowly missed the threshold by less than 500 votes.
2024	(Czech Republic) (Liberec)	Liberec regional	Regional Council of Liberec	Regional results	Stačilo!	4.993%	5,670	5%	5,679	-0.007%	-19	Stačilo! narrowly missed 5% threshold.
1967	(Netherlands)	Dutch general	Second Chamber	National results	Christian-Democratic Union	0.6591%	45,346	0.6667%	45,854	-0.008%	-508	The CDU narrowly missed the threshold by less than 600 votes.
2026	(Armenia)	Armenian parliamentary	National Assembly	National results	Prosperous Armenia	3.989%	58,287	4%	58,443	-0.011%	-156	Originally, they had 3.996%. It was reported to be at 4% because the CEC website misleadingly rounded them up. The other two opposition parties implied that they might not take their seats if BHK fails. The party claimed that the CEC website differed from the actual election results in some polling stations demanding a recount. After a recount, BHK gained 147 votes but the CEC also invalidated the results of three polling stations removing 213 votes again without holding a by-election leading to criticism.
2023	(Montenegro)	Montenegrin parliamentary	Parliament	National results	Social Democratic Party of Montenegro	2.98%	9,010	3%	9,073	-0.02%	-63	SDP narrowly missed the threshold by 0.02%
2023	(Italy) (Friuli-Venezia Giulia)	Friuli-Venezia Giulia regional	Regional Council of Friuli-Venezia Giulia	Statewide results	Together Free	3.98%	15,712	4%	15,799	-0.02%	-87	IL narrowly missed the threshold by 0.02%.
2024	(Hungary) (Budapest)	Budapest Local	Capital City Assembly	Citywide results	Momentum Movement	4.98%	39,471	5%	39,615	-0.02%	-144	MM narrowly missed the threshold by 0.02%
1997	(Germany) (Hamburg)	Hamburg state	Hamburg Parliament	Statewide results	German People's Union	4.98%	40,957	5%	41,126	-0.02%	-169	DVU narrowly missed the threshold by 0.02%
1971	(Denmark)	Danish general	Folketing	National results	Christian People's Party	1.98%	57,072	2%	57,678	-0.02%	-606	KF narrowly missed the threshold in their first election.
1980	(Germany) (North Rhine-Westphalia)	North Rhine-Westphalia state	Landtag of North Rhine-Westphalia	Statewide results	Free Democratic Party	4.98%	489,225	5%	490,926	-0.02%	-1,699	FDP narrowly missed the threshold by 0.02%
1992	(Romania)	Romanian general	Chamber of Deputies	National results	Democratic Agrarian Party of Romania	2.98%	322,990	3%	324,766	-0.02%	-1,776	PDAR narrowly missed the threshold by 0.02%
2025	(Germany)	German federal	Bundestag	National results	Sahra Wagenknecht Alliance	4.98%	2,472,947	5%	2,482,476	-0.02%	-9,529	The BSW narrowly misses the threshold in their first election. Requests for a recount were later dismissed by the Election audit committee of the Bundestag.
1977	(Netherlands)	Dutch general	Second Chamber	National results	Reformatory Political Federation	0.640%	53,220	0.667%	55,451	-0.027%	-2,231	RPF narrowly missed the threshold in their first election.
2020	(Italy) (Aosta Valley)	Valdostan regional council	Regional Council of Aosta Valley	Regional results	Centre-right	5.68%	3,761	5.71%	3,788	-0.03%	-27	CDX narrowly missed the threshold.
2015	(Germany) (Bremen (state))	Bremen state parliament	Bürgerschaft of Bremen	Bremerhaven	Alternative for Germany	4.97%	7,936	5%	7,985	-0.03%	-49	AfD narrowly missed the threshold in Bremerhaven and only get seats from Bremen.
2022	(Latvia)	Latvian parliamentary	Saeima	National results	Development/For!	4.97%	45,452	5%	45,701	-0.03%	-249	Development/For narrowly missed the 5% threshold, and initially had enough to obtain seats in the Saeima but eventually failed to meet the threshold within the last minute.
1992	(Germany) (Schleswig-Holstein)	Schleswig-Holstein state	Landtag of Schleswig-Holstein	Statewide results	Alliance 90/The Greens	4.97%	74,014	5%	74,396	-0.03%	-382	Grüne narrowly missed the threshold by 0.03%
2020	(Slovakia)	Slovak parliamentary	National Council	National results	Progressive Slovakia–Together	6.97%	200,780	7%	201,706	-0.03%	-926	PS/Spolu needed 7% to meet the threshold as a coalition of two parties.
2020	(Germany) (Hamburg)	Hamburg state	Hamburg Parliament	Statewide results	Free Democratic Party	4.97%	202,059	5%	203,118	-0.03%	-1,059	FDP missed the 5% threshold.
2019	(Israel)	Israel legislative	Knesset	National results	The New Right	3.22%	138,598	3.25%	140,052	-0.03%	-1,454	The New Right party missed the threshold of 3.25% necessary to obtain seats in the Knesset. Initially, the margin was close enough that absentee votes could affect it; however, after absentee ballots were counted the party remained out of the Knesset, and demanded a recount.
1967	(Netherlands)	Dutch general	Second Chamber	National results	Party for the Unmarried	0.630%	43,340	0.667%	45,854	-0.037%	-2,514	PVO narrowly missed the threshold in their only election.
2016	(Czech Republic) (Vysočina Region)	Vysočina regional	Regional Council of Vysočina	Regional results	Žijeme Vysočinou	4.96%	7,531	5%	7,590	-0.04%	-59	Coalition of TOP 09 and Zelení narrowly missed 5% threshold by 59 votes.
2019	(European Union) (Slovakia)	European Parliament	European Parliament	Slovakia	Party of the Hungarian Community	4.96%	48,929	5%	49,284	-0.04%	-355	SMK-MKP lost their MEP thus no Hungarian party from Slovakia won seats.
2014	(Slovenia)	Slovenian parliamentary	National Assembly	National results	Slovenian People's Party	3.95%	34,548	4%	34,972	-0.05%	-424	SLS narrowly missed the threshold for the first time.
2014	(Germany) (Saxony)	Saxony state	Landtag of Saxony	Statewide results	National Democratic Party of Germany	4.95%	81,051	5%	81,875	-0.05%	-824	NPD narrowly missed the threshold losing its representation.
2016	(Slovakia)	Slovak parliamentary	National Council	National results	Christian Democratic Movement	4.94%	128,908	5%	130,388	-0.06%	-1,480	KDH narrowly missed the threshold by 0.06%.

== See also ==
- Election audits
- Elections
- Electoral integrity
