= Ouidad Bakkali =

Italian politician (born 1986)

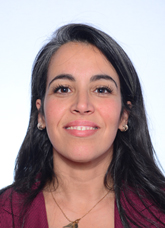
- Bakkali in 2022

Member of the Chamber of Deputies
- Incumbent
- Assumed office 13 October 2022
- Constituency: Emilia-Romagna – 03

Personal details
- Born: 15 March 1986 (age 40)
- Party: Democratic Party (since 2007)

Ouidad Bakkali (born 15 March 1986) is a Moroccan-born Italian politician serving as a member of the Chamber of Deputies since 2022. From 2021 to 2022, she served as president of the municipal council of Ravenna.

== Biography ==
Born in Agadir,Morocco, into a family of Berber descent, Bakkali moved to Italy at the age of two, along with her mother and older sister, as part of a family reunification with her father; she has a younger sister who was born in Italy. She has lived in Casal Borsetti, a hamlet in the municipality of Ravenna, since childhood and acquired Italian citizenship at the age of 23.

She graduated from the language high school in Ravenna and earned a bachelor’s degree in International and Diplomatic Studies from the Forlì Campus of the University of Bologna, subsequently, in November 2013, she participated in an intensive master’s program in European project management. In May 2014, through the U.S. Consulate in Florence, she was selected to participate in the International Visitors Leadership Program, an intensive professional and cultural exchange program organized by the United States Department of State.

On November 13, 2015, she was caught up in the terrorist attacks in Paris but was unharmed.
