= List of people named in the Pandora Papers =

This is a partial list of people named in the Pandora Papers as shareholders, directors and beneficiaries of offshore companies. In total, 35 current and former national leaders appear in the leaked documents, alongside 400 officials from nearly 100 countries. More than 100 billionaires, 29,000 offshore accounts, 30 current and former leaders, and 300 public officials were named in the first leaks in October 2021.

== Heads of state ==
=== Current heads of state at the time of the release ===
- Ilham Aliyev, President of Azerbaijan
- Sebastián Piñera, President of Chile
- Denis Sassou Nguesso, President of the Republic of the Congo
- Nicos Anastasiades, President of Cyprus
- Luis Abinader, President of the Dominican Republic
- Guillermo Lasso, President of Ecuador
- Ali Bongo Ondimba, President of Gabon
- Abdullah II, King of Jordan
- Uhuru Kenyatta, President of Kenya
- Tamim bin Hamad Al Thani, Emir of Qatar
- Volodymyr Zelenskyy, President of Ukraine

=== Former heads of state ===
- César Gaviria, former president of Colombia.
- Andrés Pastrana, former president of Colombia.
- Alfredo Cristiani, former president of El Salvador
- Francisco Flores Pérez, former president of El Salvador
- Porfirio Lobo Sosa, former president of Honduras
- Milo Đukanović, former president of Montenegro
- Ricardo Martinelli, former president of Panama
- Ernesto Pérez Balladares, former president of Panama
- Juan Carlos Varela, former president of Panama
- Horacio Cartes, former president of Paraguay
- Pedro Pablo Kuczynski, former president of Peru

== Heads of government ==
=== Current heads of government at the time of the release ===
- Patrick Achi, Prime Minister of Ivory Coast
- Najib Mikati, Prime Minister of Lebanon
- Sheikh Mohammed bin Rashid Al Maktoum, Prime Minister of the United Arab Emirates and Emir of Dubai

=== Former heads of government ===
- Andrej Babiš, prime minister of the Czech Republic
- Sheikh Khalifa bin Salman Al Khalifa, former prime minister of Bahrain
- (Georgia (country)) Bidzina Ivanishvili, former prime minister of Georgia
- Laurent Lamothe, former prime minister of Haiti
- Leung Chun-ying, former chief executive of Hong Kong
- Tung Chee-hwa, former chief executive of Hong Kong
- Abdul Karim Kabariti, former prime minister of Jordan
- Hassan Diab, former prime minister of Lebanon
- Sükhbaataryn Batbold, former prime minister of Mongolia
- Chimed Saikhanbileg, former prime minister of Mongolia
- Aires Ali, former prime minister of Mozambique
- Tony Blair, former prime minister of the United Kingdom

== Heads of organizations ==
- (France) (United Nations) Dominique Strauss-Kahn, former managing director of the International Monetary Fund.
- Ivan Bakanov, former Head of the Security Service of Ukraine.

== Ministers ==
- (Mexico) Jorge Arganis Díaz Leal, Secretary of Communications and Transport
- (Brazil) Paulo Guedes, Minister of the Economy
- (Russia) Andrey Vavilov, former Russian Deputy Finance Minister
- (Netherlands) Wopke Hoekstra, minister of finance and Leader of the Christian Democratic Appeal
- Shaukat Tarin, Finance Minister of Pakistan
- (Pakistan) Moonis Elahi, Minister for Water Resources
- Raja Nadir Pervez, Former Minister for Interior of Pakistan
- Charles Sipanje, former permanent secretary of Zambia
- (United Kingdom) Jonathan Aitken, former Chief Secretary to the Treasury
- John Dalli, former minister of economy, finance and foreign affairs of Malta, and EU Commissioner
- (Philippines) Arthur Tugade, incumbent secretary of transportation
- (Indonesia) Airlangga Hartarto, Coordinating Minister for Economic Affairs
- (Indonesia) Luhut Binsar Pandjaitan, Coordinating Minister for Maritime and investments Affairs
- (Uganda) Jim Muhwezi, Ugandan Security Minister
- (Malaysia) Daim Zainuddin, former Malaysian Minister of Finance and Chief of the Council of Eminent Persons (CEP)
- (Malaysia) Tengku Zafrul Aziz, Malaysian Minister of International Trade and Industry
- (Malaysia) Yamani Hafez Musa, former Malaysian Deputy Minister of Finance
- Ahmad Zahid Hamidi, Deputy Prime Minister of Malaysia and President of the United Malays National Organisation (UMNO)
- (Serbia) Siniša Mali, Minister of Finance and former Mayor of Belgrade
- (Serbia) Novica Tončev, Minister without portfolio and former mayor of Surdulica
- (Mauritania) Mohamed Abdellahi Ould Yaha, former Mauritanian minister of investment
- Nirupama Rajapaksa, former deputy minister of Water Supply & Drainage of Sri Lanka
- (Tunisia) Mohsen Marzouk, secretary-general of the Arab Democracy Foundation
- Ángela María Orozco, Minister of Transport of Colombia
- Rafael Ramírez Carreño, former minister of Oil and Mining and former president of Petróleos de Venezuela (PDVSA) between 2004 and 2013.
- (Venezuela) Nervis Villalobos, viceminister of energy during the government of Hugo Chávez between 2004 and 2006
- (Russia) Konstantin Goloshchapov, Russian economic minister

== Bankers ==
- Roberto Campos Neto, president of the Central Bank of Brazil
- (Lebanon) Marwan Kheireddine, Lebanese banker, businessperson and former minister
- Riad Salameh, Governor of Lebanon's central bank, Banque du Liban
- Khan Arif Usmani, President of National Bank of Pakistan
- (Philippines) Helen Dee, daughter of Alfonso Yuchengco, Chairman of Rizal Commercial Banking Corporation
- (Switzerland) Tito Tettamanti, founder of Fidinam
- (Morocco) Nessim El Maleh, former director of HSBC Private Bank Suisse
- (Russia) Vitaly Zhogin, former board member of Interprombank
- (Uruguay) Jorge Peirano Basso, Dante Peirano Basso, José Peirano Basso, Juan Peirano Basso, Luisa Peirano Basso, Blanca Peirano Basso, María Peirano Basso and Jorge Peirano Facio: Uruguayan family of bankers, convicted for money laundering and fraud
- (Italy) Alessandro Falciai, former president of Banca Monte dei Paschi di Siena

== Media ==
- (Pakistan) Hameed Haroon, CEO of Dawn Media Group
- (Pakistan) Sultan Ali Lakhani, CEO of Express Media Group
- Arif Nizami, journalist and editor of Pakistan Today
- (Pakistan) Mir Shakilur Rehman, editor-in-chief of Jang Media Group
- Konstantin Ernst, CEO of Channel One Russia

== Legislators ==
- (France) Sylvain Maillard, member of the National Assembly and general director of Alantys Technology
- (Israel) Nir Barkat, former mayor of Jerusalem and current member of the Knesset
- Haim Ramon - former Vice Prime Minister of Israel and former member of the Knesset
- Chaudhry Moonis Elahi, Member of the National Assembly of Pakistan
- (Pakistan) Aleem Khan, Senior Minister of Punjab and Minister of Food, Member of the Provincial Assembly of the Punjab
- (Pakistan) Sharjeel Memon, former member of the Provincial Assembly of Sindh
- Faisal Vawda, member of the Senate of Pakistan, former member of the National Assembly and former Minister for Water Resources
- The family of Win Gatchalian, Rex Gatchalian and Wes Gatchalian, Senator of the Philippines, the Mayor of Valenzuela and Member of the House of Representatives of the Philippines
- (Russia) Alexei Chepa, Russian Member of the Federal Assembly
- (United Kingdom) Paul Deighton, member of the House of Lords and Chairman of The Economist Group
- (Malaysia) William Leong, member of the Dewan Rakyat

== Politicians ==
- Satish Sharma, former member of the Union Cabinet in the Government of India.
- Harish Salve, former Solicitor General of India
- (Chad) Zakaria Idriss Déby Itno, Chadian Ambassador to the United Arab Emirates and stepbrother of President Mahamat Déby
- (Bulgaria) Delyan Peevski, Bulgarian politician and oligarch, former member of the National Assembly
- (Honduras) Nasry Asfura, mayor of Tegucigalpa
- (Russia) Alexander Mamut, Russian billionaire and former advisor to Boris Yeltsin
- (United Kingdom) Ben Elliot, co-chairman of the Conservative Party
- (United Kingdom) Patrick Robertson, British political advisor and founder of the Bruges Group
- Glenn Godfrey, former Attorney-General of Belize
- (Ecuador) Jaime Durán Barba, consultant of former president of Argentina Mauricio Macri
- Zulema María Eva Menem, former First Lady of Argentina and daughter of former president of Argentina Carlos Menem
- Daniel Muñoz, secretary of former president of Argentina Néstor Kirchner
- (Mexico) Julio Scherer Ibarra, former advisor of Mexican President Andrés Manuel López Obrador
- (Mexico) Enrique Martinez y Martinez, former governor of Coahuila (1999–2015)
- (Mexico) José Manuel Sanz Rivera,
- (Philippines) Andres Bautista, former chairman of the Commission on Elections and chairman of the Presidential Commission on Good Government
- Rolando Gapud, executive chairman of Del Monte Pacific Limited, former member of the board of governors of the Development Bank of the Philippines and former associate of the late dictator Ferdinand Marcos
- Dennis Uy, chairman and CEO of Udenna Corporation, and CEO of CSO of Phoenix Petroleum, Honorary Consul of the Philippines in Kazakhstan and associate of Philippine President Rodrigo Duterte
- (Switzerland) Jürg Wissmann, Swiss attorney and politician for the Christian Democratic People's Party
- (France) Aymeric Chauprade, former member of the European Parliament
- (France) Nicolas Perruchot, former mayor of Blois and former member of the French National Assembly
- (Colombia) Lisandro Junco Riveira, chairman of National Directorate of Taxes and Customs
- (Colombia) Guillermo Botero, Colombian Ambassador to Chile and former Minister of Defense
- (Colombia) Luis Diego Monsalve, Colombian Ambassador to China
- (Colombia) Fuad Char Abdala, former congressman.
- (Colombia) Alejandro Char Chaljub, former mayor of Barranquilla and former governor of Atlántico.
- (Colombia) Arturo Char Chaljub, senator and former president of Congress.
- (Colombia) David Char Navas, former congressman indicted for colliding with paramilitaries.
- Carlos Morales Troncoso, former Vice President of the Dominican Republic
- (Nigeria) Peter Obi, former Governor of Anambra, former vice presidential candidate for the People's Democratic Party and presidential aspirant.
- (Nigeria) Abubakar Atiku Bagudu, governor of Kebbi State
- (Morocco) Yassir Znagui, advisor of Moroccan king Mohammed VI and former minister
- Marta Lucía Ramírez, Vice President of Colombia.
- Ricardo Álvarez, current Vice President of Honduras and former mayor of Tegucigalpa.
- (Spain) Xavier García Albiol, mayor of Badalona and former senator and member of the Catalan parliament.
- (Italy) Bernabò Bocca, president of Federalberghi and former senator of Forza Italia
- (Morocco) Youssef Benjelloun, member of the parliament for the Justice and development party.
- (India) Sushil Gupta, former income tax chief commissioner

== Relatives and associates of government officials ==
- (Belarus) Sergei Sheiman, son of Viktor Sheiman, Belarusian politician
- (Cameroon) Marie Gisèle Minlo Momo, wife of Babel Ndanga Ndinga, former Cameroonian minister of mining, trade and expertise growth
- (Comoros) Nour-El-Fath Azali, son of President Azali Assoumani
- Faharate Mahamoud, sister of the Comoros Minister of Interior, Mahamoud Fakridine
- (Nigeria) Ibrahim Bagudu, brother of Abubakar Atiku Bagudu
- (Russia) Svetlana Krivonogikh, associate and alleged former lover of Russian president Vladimir Putin
- (Russia) Gennady Timchenko, billionaire Russian oligarch and close friend of President Vladimir Putin
- (Russia) Petr Kolbin, businessman and close friend of President Vladimir Putin
- (United Kingdom) Cherie Blair, wife of former British prime minister Tony Blair
- (United Kingdom) Helena de Chair, wife of Jacob Rees-Mogg, Leader of the House of Commons
- (Italy) Marina Berlusconi, daughter of Silvio Berlusconi
- (Italy) Silvia Tucci, ex-wife of Gianni De Michelis, member of the Italian Socialist Party, who served as minister in many Italian governments

== Royalty ==
- (Germany) (Denmark) Corinna zu Sayn-Wittgenstein-Sayn, German-born Danish princess and entrepreneur
- Abdullah II, King of Jordan
- Lalla Hasnaa, Princess of Morocco
- Tamim bin Hamad Al Thani, Emir of Qatar
- (Qatar) House of Thani, Qatari Royal family
- Juan Carlos I, former King of Spain
- Crown Estate of the United Kingdom

== Religious figures ==
- (Mexico) Father Luis Garza Medina, former Vicar General of the Legion of Christ

== Businesspeople ==
- (Nepal) Binod Chaudhary, Nepalese billionaire businessman
- (Morocco) Taib, chairman of Comsquare.
- (Morocco) Saïd Alj, Moroccan businessman. Founder of the Sanam Holding.
- (Morocco) Moulay Abdallah Lalami, CEO of Societe Fiduciaire du Maroc or SFM.
- (Morocco) Faïçal Mekouar, CEO of Fidaroc Grant Thornton.
- (Morocco) Omar Alaoui, Moroccan architect.
- (South Korea) Lee Jae Yong, chairman of Samsung.
- (Saudi Arabia) Abu Jamal, Saudi Arabian billionaire.
- (India) Niranjan Hiranandani, Indian businessperson
- (India) Pramod Mittal, Indian businessperson
- (India) Anil Ambani, Indian businessperson
- (India) Nirav Modi, Indian businessperson
- (India) Vinod Adani, Indian businessperson
- (India) Kiran Mazumdar-Shaw, Indian businessperson
- (India) (United Kingdom) John Shaw, British businessperson and husband of Kiran Mazumdar-Shaw
- (United States) Robert F. Smith, American investor and CEO of Vista Equity Partners and Democratic Party donor
- (United States) Robert T. Brockman, American billionaire and CEO of Reynolds & Reynolds and Republican Party donor
- (United States) Jared Wheat, drug smuggler and former CEO of Hi-Tech Pharmaceuticals
- (United States) David R. Hinkson, convicted criminal and founder of WaterOz
- (United States) (Belarus) Aleksandr Zingman, Belarusian-American businessperson
- (Turkey) Erman Ilıcak, businessperson, investor, and president of Rönesans Holding
- (Russia) Yuri Kovalchuk, Russian shareholder in Bank Rossiya
- (Russia) Victor Fedotov, Russian oil tycoon
- (Russia) Semyon Vainshtok, CEO of Transneft
- (Russia) Mikhail Gutseriev, Russian oligarch
- (Russia) Suleyman Kerimov, Russian oligarch
- (Russia) (United Kingdom) Lubov Chernukhin, Russian-born British banker and major donor to the British Conservative Party
- (Equatorial Guinea) Antonio Oburu, managing director of GePetrol
- (Pakistan) Javed Afridi, Owner of the Peshawar Zalmi franchise, Pakistani business executive and entrepreneur.
- (Mexico) María Asunción Aramburuzabala, Mexican businessperson
- (Mexico) Germán Larrea Mota-Velasco, Mexican businessperson
- (Belgium) Bernard de Laguiche, board director of Solvay S.A.
- (Belgium) Hubert de Wangen, former executive at Solvay S.A.
- (Canada) Bruce Rockowitz, Chairman of Rock Media International
- (Australia) Graeme Briggs, founder of the Asiaciti Trust.
- (Malaysia) Lim Kok Thay, Malaysian billionaire, Chairman & CEO Genting Group
- (Taiwan) Joseph Tsai, co-founder and executive vice chairman of Alibaba Group
- (Hong Kong) Allan Zeman, CEO of Mesco Shipyard Ltd
- (China) Du Shuanghua, Chinese billionaire
- (Montenegro) Aco Đukanović, Montenegrin businessperson, brother of Milo Đukanović
- (Montenegro) Blažo Đukanović, Montenegrin businessperson, son of Milo Đukanović
- (Serbia) Nikola Petrović, Serbian businessman and best man of Aleksandar Vučić
- Sattar Hajee Abdoula, CEO of Grant Thornton Mauritius
- (Ukraine) Ihor Kolomoisky, Ukrainian oligarch
- (Malaysia) Jho Low, Malaysian financier and mastermind of the 1MDB embezzlement scandal
- (Brazil) Antonio Jose, vulgo Pai, construction tycoon
- (Israel) Beny Steinmetz, Israeli businessperson
- (Israel) (Cyprus) Teddy Sagi, Israeli-Cypriot billionaire
- (Israel) Idan Ofer, Israeli billionaire
- (Israel) (Monaco) Eyal Ofer, Israeli-Monégasque billionaire
- (Israel) Moshe Hogeg, Israeli businessperson
- (Israel) Eytan Stibbe, Israeli businessperson and astronaut
- (Israel) Arnon Milchan, Israeli billionaire and film producer
- (Botswana) Ramachandran Ottapathu, Botswanan CEO of Choppies
- (Nigeria) Aliko Dangote, Nigerian industrialist.
- (Zimbabwe) Billy Rautenbach, Zimbabwean mining magnate
- (Mexico) Olegario Vázquez Aldir, Mexican businessperson
- (Malaysia) Tony Fernandes, Malaysian founder of AirAsia
- (Japan) Masayoshi Son, Japanese billionaire technology entrepreneur
- (Philippines) The Aboitiz family, Philippine businesspersons
- Joselito Campos, Jr., son of Jose Yao Campos, chairman and CEO of NutriAsia, vice-chairman of Del Monte Philippines and Chairman of the Fort Bonifacio Development Corporation
- (Philippines) The Gaisano family, Philippine businesspeople
- (Philippines) Oscar Hilado, Chairman of Phinma Corporation
- (Philippines) Elmer Serrano, chairman and President of the ES Consultancy Group and business associate of the Sy family
- (Philippines) Enrique K. Razon, chairman and CEO of International Container Terminal Services and Chairman of Bloomberry
- (Philippines) Peter Rodriguez, Founder of Asian Aerospace Corporation
- (Philippines) The estate of Henry Sy, including Teresita Sy-Coson and his other children, Philippine businesspersons
- (Philippines) Zenaida Tantoco and Anthony Tantoco Huang, CEO of SSI Group, Inc. and president and director of SSI Group, Inc.
- (Philippines) The Wenceslao family, Philippine businesspeople
- (Italy) Flavio Briatore, Italian Formula One businessperson
- (Italy) Giampaolo Angelucci, Italian businessman and entrepreneur
- (Hong Kong) (Macau) Stanley Ho, former chairman of Shun Tak Holdings
- (Guatemala) Federico Kong Vielman, Guatemalan Director of Banco Industrial
- (United Kingdom) Mohamed Amersi, British businessperson
- (United Kingdom) Ben Goldsmith, British financier and member of the Goldsmith Family
- (Russia) (United Kingdom) Alexander Temerko, Russian-born British businessman and Conservative Party donor
- (United Kingdom) Bernie Ecclestone, British Formula One business magnate
- (Iran) Ata Ahsani, Iranian founder and chairman of Unaoil
- (Iran) (United Kingdom) Cyrus Ahsani, Iranian-British treasurer of Monaco's Ambassador's Club
- (United Kingdom) Saman Ahsani, Iranian-British trustee of the Iran Heritage Foundation
- (France) Pierre Castel, French CEO of Castel Group
- (Chile) Carlos Alberto Délano, Chilean businessperson
- (Colombia) Alejandro Santo Domingo, Colombian businessperson
- (Colombia) Luis Carlos Sarmiento, Colombian businessperson
- (Colombia) Isaac, Jaime and Gabriel Gilinski, Colombian businesspersons
- (Colombia) Eduardo Pacheco Cortés, Colombian businessperson
- (Colombia) The Barberi family, Colombian businesspersons
- (Colombia) The Char family, Colombian businesspersons and political group
- (Colombia) The Echavarría family, Colombian businesspersons
- (Sri Lanka) Thirukumar Nadesan, former director of Capital Maharaja Organisation
- (Mauritania) Mohamed Abdellahi Ould Yaha, Mauritanian businessperson and former minister
- (Uruguay) Juan Salgado, Uruguayan businessman
- (Spain) Francisco Correa Sánchez, Spanish businessman
- (Spain) Pedro Mouriño, Spanish businessman

== Sports personalities ==
- (Argentina) Ángel Di María, Argentine football player
- (Canada) Jacques Villeneuve, Canadian racing driver
- (Canada) Elvis Stojko, Canadian figure skater
- (France) Guy Forget, French tennis administrator and retired professional tennis player
- (India) Sachin Tendulkar, Indian cricketer
- (Italy) Carlo Ancelotti, Italian football manager
- (Italy) Roberto Mancini, Italian football manager and former player
- (Italy) (Netherlands) Mino Raiola, Dutch-Italian football agent
- (Italy) Gianluca Vialli, Italian football player
- (Italy) Walter Zenga, Italian footballer and manager
- (Spain) Pep Guardiola, Spanish football manager
- (Uruguay) Diego Godín, Uruguayan football player
- (Uruguay) Luis Suarez, Uruguayan football player

== Media personalities ==
- (Canada) David Furnish, Canadian filmmaker
- (Colombia) Shakira, Colombian singer
- (Germany) Claudia Schiffer, German model
- (India) Jackie Shroff, Indian Bollywood actor
- (Morocco) Morjana Alaoui, Moroccan actress. She is a daughter of the Moroccan architect, Omar Alaoui.
- (Morocco) RedOne, Moroccan singer, songwriter, record producer and record executive
- (Peru) (Spain) Mario Vargas Llosa, Peruvian-Spanish Nobel Prize in Literature laureate
- (Philippines) Robbie Santos and the Santos family, Philippine fashion designer, businessperson and educator
- (South Korea) Lee Soo-man, South Korean record executive and record producer (SM Entertainment)
- (Spain) Julio Iglesias, Spanish singer
- (Spain) Miguel Bosé, Spanish singer
- (Spain) Paloma San Basilio, Spanish singer
- (Spain) José María Dols Samper, Spanish bullfighter
- (Sweden) Swedish House Mafia, Swedish house music group
- (Russia) Sergei Roldugin, Russian musician
- (United Kingdom) Elton John, British singer
- (United Kingdom) Ringo Starr, British drummer and former member of The Beatles
- (Italy) Monica Bellucci, Italian actress and model
- (Italy) (Brazil) Alessandra Ambrosio, Italian-Brazilian model

== Organised crime ==
- (Italy) Raffaele Amato, Italian crime boss and head of the Scissionisti di Secondigliano
- (Italy) Delfo Zorzi, Italian-born Japanese neo-fascist and alleged terrorist
- (Canada) Alexandre Cazes, Canadian citizen and founder of the dark web site AlphaBay

== Other ==
- (Comoros) Afif Mshangama, Comorian lawyer
- (France) Éric Fiorile, founder of French far-right conspiracy theorist movement Conseil National de Transition
- Homi Rajvansh, Ex-Indian Revenue Service Officer and Additional Managing Director of National Agricultural Cooperative Marketing Federation of India
- (Italy) Massimo Bochicchio, Italian broker
- (Serbia) Igor Isailović, Serbian lawyer, friend and associate of Ana Brnabić and Siniša Mali
- (Spain) Ricardo Bofill, Spanish architect
- (Spain) Santiago Calatrava, Spanish architect
- (Switzerland) Susanne Reinhardt, Swiss wealth advisor
- (United Kingdom) Douglas Latchford, British art dealer
- (United Kingdom) Lady Tina Green, British treasurer to Charlene, Princess of Monaco and wife of Sir Phillip Green
- (United States) Robert Durst, convicted murderer and real estate heir
- (United States) Carlos Kepce, American lawyer

== Organisations ==
- (Belgium) Solvay S.A., Belgian chemical company
- (Mexico) Legionaries of Christ, Roman Catholic clerical religious order
- Unaoil, Monaco based energy company
- (Panama) Alcogal, Panamanian law firm
- (Russia) Rostec, Russian arms manufacturer
- (Russia) VTB Bank, Russian financial services provider
- (Singapore) Asiaciti, Singaporean wealth management company
- (Malaysia) Gedeihen Engineering Pte Ltd, Malaysian Based Construction Firm & Denmark Offshore Investment Proxy Firm
- (Switzerland) Fidinam, Swiss wealth consultancy
- (United Kingdom) Bloomsbury Publishing, British publisher
- (United Kingdom) Farrer & Co, British law firm
- (United States) Abbott Laboratories, American healthcare company
- (United States) Apple Inc., American technology company
- (United States) Baker McKenzie, American law firm
- (United States) Nike, American clothing company
- (United States) RJR Nabisco, American tobacco manufacturer

== See also ==
- List of people named in the Panama Papers
- List of people and organisations named in the Paradise Papers
- Reactions to the Pandora Papers
