= Monica Duca Widmer =

Swiss politician (born 1959)

Member of the Grand Council of Ticino
- In office 1995–2011

President of the Grand Council of Ticino
- In office 2007–?

President of the Università della Svizzera italiana Council
- Incumbent
- Assumed office December 2016

Personal details
- Born: 1959 (age 66–67) Ascona, Ticino, Switzerland
- Party: Christian Democratic People's Party
- Children: 2
- Education: ETH Zurich; University of Milan
- Occupation: Politician; businesswoman; chemical engineer

Monica Duca Widmer (born 1959) is a Swiss politician, businesswoman, chemical engineer, and public administrator. After obtaining chemistry degrees from the ETH Zurich and University of Milan, she founded environment and waste management company EcoRisana in 1992 and has served as its manager for more than two decades. She served in the Grand Council of Ticino from 1995 to 2011. She ran for one of the National Council's Ticino seats in the 2011 Swiss federal election, but after a tie lost to Marco Romano in a manual draw. She has also served as a public administrator, including as president of the Federal Commission for Atomic, Biological and Chemical Protection (1995–2007) and the Università della Svizzera italiana Council (2016–present).

== Biography ==
Originally from Ascona, Ticino, Monica Duca Widmer was born in 1959 in nearby Arosio. She studied chemistry at ETH Zurich, where she graduated with a chemical engineering degree in 1984. She obtained a doctorate in chemistry from the University of Milan in 1987.

Duca Widmer originally worked in the international food industry before moving to environmental safety. In 1992, she founded an environment and waste management company named EcoRisana. She has served as its manager and board chair for more than two decades.

=== Political career ===
In 1995, Duca Widmer was elected to the Grand Council of Ticino as a Christian Democratic People's Party member. She became its president in 2007 and served in the Grand Council until 2011. and, in that capacity, imposed a stricter dress code within the parliament building. She is known for her work against human trafficking, advocating the Nordic model of prostitution that criminalizes clients and not sex workers.

Duca Widmer ran in the 2011 Swiss federal election as a candidate for one of the National Council's Ticino seats, where both she and Marco Romano received 23,979 votes. Initially, a computer program was used to draw lots and Duca Widmer was declared the winner. Following complaints and appeals, the Federal Supreme Court ruled against the Canton's decision to use a computer program for the lottery. A new manual lottery was conducted on 25 November and Romano emerged as the winner.

Following her loss, Duca Widmer withdrew from active political life.

=== Public sector career ===
Duca Widmer served as president of the Federal Commission for Atomic, Biological and Chemical Protection from 1995 to 2007. In 2001, she became chair of the Board of Directors of Migros Ticino. She has sat on several other commissions, including the Swiss Academy of Engineering Sciences, the Armaments Commission, and the Federal Commission for Energy Research. Since December 2016, she has served as president of the Università della Svizzera italiana Council.

In 2015, Duca Widmer was appointed to the Council of the Swiss Federal Nuclear Safety Inspectorate. In 2019, the Federal Council appointed her as chair of the RUAG board of directors, with her role to oversee the group's restructuring. She was also part of the ETH Board from 1998 to 2008 and SUPSI board from 2004 to 2015.

In 2019, Duca Widmer was selected by 100 Women and Thousands More.

=== Personal life ===
Duca Widmer is married to a chemical engineer and has two sons. She cites Daniel Barenboim and Rita Levi-Montalcini as inspirations.
