= Ersilia Fossati =

Swiss politician

- Born: 25 March 1921
- Died: 9 October 1999 (aged 78)
- Known for: Swiss politician, campaigner for women's suffrage, one of first eleven women elected to the Grand Council of Ticino in 1971.

Ersilia Fossati (25 March 1921 - 9 October 1999) was a Swiss politician from the canton of Ticino. She was a member of the Christian Democratic People's Party of Switzerland and a campaigner for women's suffrage. When Switzerland eventually granted women the federal vote on 7 February 1971, Fossati was one of the first eleven women elected to the Grand Council of Ticino in 1971.

== Early life and education ==
Ersilia Fossati was born on 25 March 1921 in Veneto near Piave, in Italy, where her father ran a cooperative. She was the eldest of eleven children born to Rosa (née Scala) and Andrea Fossati, an engineer from Carona. Her father's family came from Meride, in the canton of Ticino, in Switzerland.

During her childhood, she was in regular contact with her Swiss relatives in Ticino and spent her summer holidays at her paternal family's house. In 1939, the imminence of the Second World War led to her family moving back from Italy to live in Meride in Switzerland.

Ersilia Fossati attended primary and secondary school at the Ghislanzoni Institute in Milan, in Italy run by the Ursulines of Saint Charles.

She continued her studies at the teacher training college, the Magistrale di Locarno, where she earned a teaching certificate in 1941.

== Second World War ==
From 1941 to 1942, Fossati taught Italian at the Institute of the Sisters of Ingenbohl, during which time she also learned German.

In 1940, Fossati volunteered for the Frauenhilfsdienst (FHD), the Swiss Women's Army Auxiliary Service, in response to a national call from General Henri Guisan. Although Switzerland remained neutral throughout the Second World War, the country was prepared to defend itself from a potential Nazi invasion through National Redoubt plans. The Swiss army was mobilised in September 1939, and women's organisations stepped up in support and the FHD was founded. The Frauenhilfsdienst was officially recognised in April 1940, and its female volunteers worked for the army in communications, logistics, and as medical orderlies. Until the end of the Second World War, Fossati carried out administrative and assistance tasks as part of the FHD, first in Berne and then in Cugnasco for which she was later awarded an honour for her service during the war. She continued her membership of the FHD until 1978, from 1951 to 1964, whilst president of the Ticino section of the FHD, she ran refresher courses in both German and Italian.

From 1941 to 1942, Fossati taught Italian at the Institute of the Sisters of Ingenbohl, during which time she also learned German.

== Career ==
Fossati had a varied work career before becoming an elected politician. Between 1942 and 1971, she worked on cataloguing dialect terms as part of the team run by Silvio Sganzini, a Swiss linguist, teacher and lexicographer, who was director of the Vocabolario dei dialetti della Svizzera italiana, an ongoing project recording and publishing the vocabulary of the dialects of Italian Switzerland.

From 1963, she was in charge of the adult education college in Lugano.

From 1971 to 1975, Fossati worked as a secretary at Fidinam, a private consultancy company. After this, she worked for the homecare service in Lugano and the surrounding area until 1983. During this time, she succeeded in tripling the number of partner municipalities.

== Political career ==
Ersilia Fossati became involved in politics in 1962, when she joined the Ticino Association for Women's Suffrage. At this point, women in Switzerland did not have the vote, despite demands being made since the later nineteenth century. In February 1959, a referendum of all male voters had voted 66.9% to 33% against granting female suffrage in all but three cantons. Fossati became involved in campaigning for women's suffrage in Switzerland, speaking at conferences organised in various communes prior to the successful 1969 cantonal and 1971 federal votes which eventually granted women's suffrage.

In 1964, Fossati founded the Lugano branch of the Zonta International club. She was president from 1964 to 1966, and again from 1970 to 1971. From 1987 to 1990, she was a member and then cantonal president of the Catholic association Pro Filia, supporting young people in educational and people of all ages in need of help.

She is also a member of the foundation board of the Pro Senectute section, which includes the canton of Ticino and the district of Moesa.

Fossati was a member of the Christian Democratic People's Party of Switzerland (PDC). She was one of the first eleven women elected to the Grand Council of Ticino in 1971, when Switzerland eventually granted women the vote. The other ten women elected were Marili Terribilini-Fluck, Elsa Franconi-Poretti, Linda Brenni, Elda Marazzi, Alice Moretti, Dina Paltenghi-Gardosi, Dionigia Duchini, Rosita Genardini, Rosita Mattei and Ilda Rossi. Fossati served until 1983, and acted as a mentor to the next generation of Catholic women in Ticino politics, including Chiara Simoneschi-Cortesi.

During the 1970s, she also chaired the Lugano PDC women's group and became the first treasurer of the cantonal PDC women's association, founded in 1985.

As a legislator and member of parliament, she campaigned for the establishment of a teacher training college for kindergarten teachers in Lugano and Locarno, fought against the abolition of maintenance payments in the event of the insolvency of a former spouse, and opposed the mining works of Saceba SA in Balerna on environmental grounds.

== Death and commemoration ==
Ersilia Fossati died in Lugano on 9 October 1999.

In 2021, the commune de Mendrisio named a road in the Meride area in Fossati's honour. In 2021, Fossati was featured in a street based exhibition in Bern featuring 52 women from across Switzerland to celebrate the 50th anniversary of women's right to vote in Switzerland. The outdoor format was designed to be safely accessible during the Covid pandemic.

== Publications ==
- Fossati, S Ersilia (1981). "1941-1981 quarantesimo di fondazione del Servizio Complementare" (pdf). Rivista militare della Svizzera italiana (in Italian). 53 (6): 18.

== Bibliography ==
- Susanna Castelletti; Lisa Fornara (2007). Donne in movimento. Massagno: FAFT.
- Association des Archives Unies des Femmes Tessin (AARDT), Melano, Ersilia Fossati (1921-1999).
