= AQUIND Interconnector =

Proposed HVDC submarine power cable between the UK and France

Location
- Country: France, United Kingdom
- General direction: North-south
- From: Pourville, France
- Passes through: English Channel
- To: Portsmouth, England

Construction information
- Construction started: Awaiting decision by UK Government. Previous refusal by UK Government in January 2022 was overturned by the High Court in January 2023.

Technical information
- Type: Submarine cable
- Current type: HVDC
- Capacity: 2000 MW
- DC voltage: 320kV

The AQUIND Interconnector is a proposed HVDC submarine power cable proposed to link France and England.

Independent research carried out in Portsmouth by Savanta suggests public support for a new transmission link between Portsmouth and Normandy. These results were reported in a number of Energy industry publications in 2024. However there was also considerable local opposition to the specific route and overall proposal

The project has faced local opposition and attracted controversy due to claims regarding its environmental impact and links between the company's backers and the Conservative Party.

A decision on the project is currently awaited from the Secretary of State for Energy Security and Net Zero. Under the previous Government, the project was refused by then Business Secretary, Kwasi Kwarteng in January 2022. This decision was subsequently overturned by judicial review in the High Court and a new decision is currently awaited from the UK Government.

== Route ==
The cable is proposed to run between the Lovedean substation in Hampshire in England to the Barnabos substation in the Normandy region of France. Landfall is proposed at Eastney in Portsmouth (UK), and Pourville in Seine-Maritime (France). The route is 242 km (150 miles) long, with 187 km (116 miles) under the sea, 25 km (16 miles) on land in the UK and 30 km (19 miles) on land in France.

== Specification ==
The HVDC link would consist of four main cables, together with two much thinner fibre optic cables for operational control and communications. HVDC involves lower transmission losses than the conventional alternating current (AC) technology used in most existing electricity networks. Land cables would be laid mainly under existing roads to minimize the environmental impact of the development.

The link was to be built as two separate 1,000 MW circuits, each with its own control and protection systems and auxiliary power supplies. The DC circuits would run at 320 kV, and operate as symmetrical monopoles. The project is expected to cost £1.1 billion.

== Controversy ==
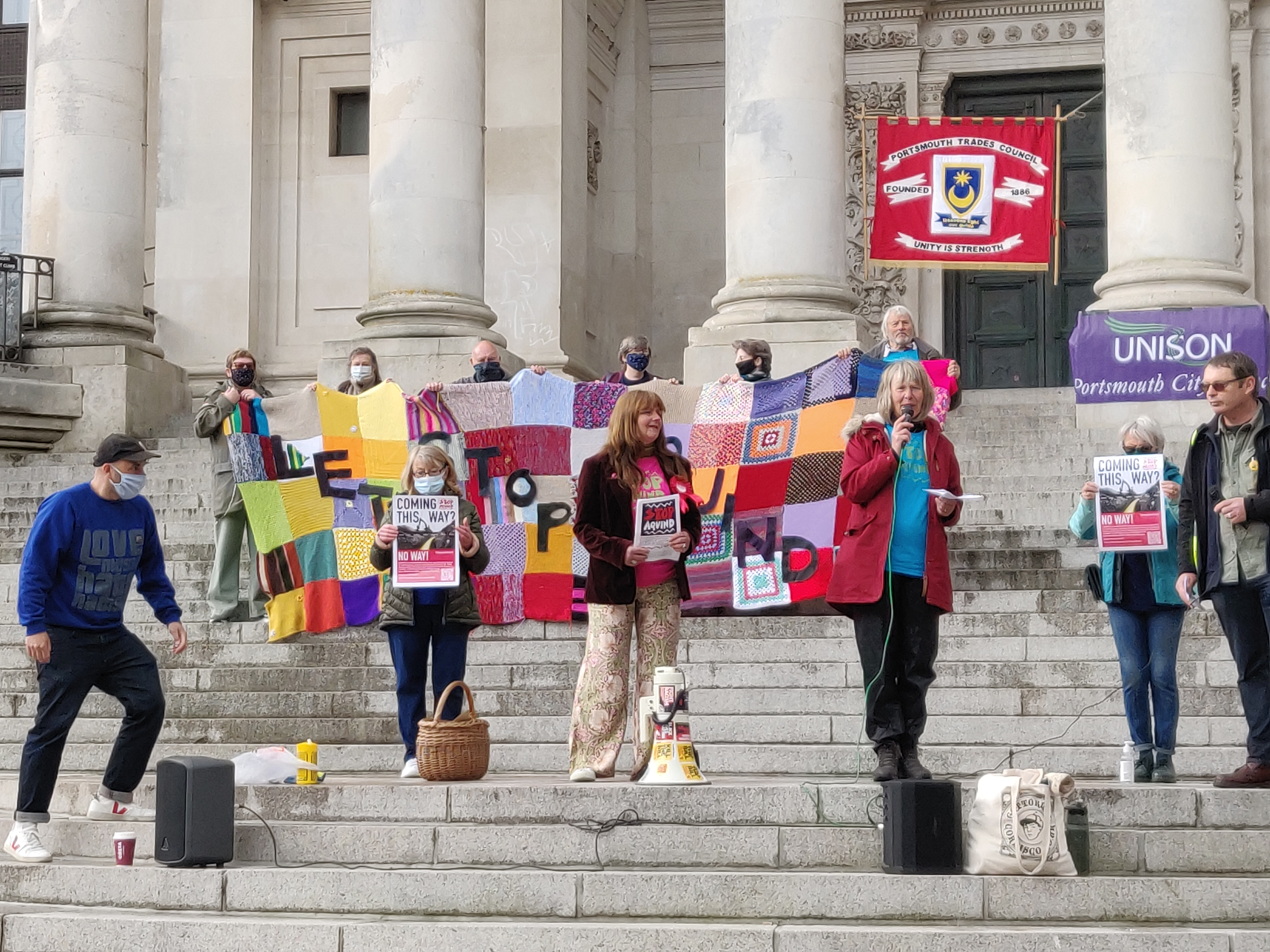
Protesters on the steps of Portsmouth Guildhall in May 2021

Campaigners and local MPs have urged the cancellation of the project. The Portsmouth South MP Stephen Morgan claims that the cable and its associated data connections pose a risk to UK national security. The Guardian newspaper reported that the promoters of the project, Viktor Fedotov and Alexander Temerko, are both substantial donors to the Conservative party and MPs, and that "Three Conservative ministers have already had to recuse themselves from the decision-making process over the Aquind undersea cable because of their links to the company." Almost 10% of MPs have received donations from companies linked to Fedotov. The minister and peer Martin Callanan was a former director of Aquind and another peer, James Wharton is a consultant to the company.

In October 2021, AQUIND vehemently denied any wrongdoing, and stated that it would "not stand silently and accept slander based on xenophobia and the principles of guilt by association." The company stated that it was considering taking legal action against the media involved.

After the development had been refused in January 2022, Temerko described Minister of State for Trade Policy Penny Mordaunt, who had represented constituents' concerns with the development, as an "absolutely uncontrollable woman" and a "threat to national security". Mordaunt subsequently said the Conservative Party's code of conduct should apply to all members, including donors, and suggested that party colleagues should not accept funds from Temerko. Aquind and Temerko had donated £1.1 million to the Conservative Party, including to 21 MPs and ministers.

In spite of attracting criticism from some political figures - independent research reported in a number of Energy industry publications in 2024 indicated strong public support for the project locally. However, there has been significant public opposition to the project including a petition with over 6,200 signatures.

== History ==
When the project was announced in June 2016, the company said that the project would come online in 2021.

In July 2019, Portsmouth Council formally objected to the plans, on the grounds that they would cause unacceptable disruption in a built-up area. Between February and April 2019, the company undertook a statutory consultation exercise. In November 2019, Aquind submitted a formal planning application for the link in the UK.

In June 2020, Aquind submitted to Ofgem and the Commission de Régulation de l'Energie (CRE) a request for partial exemption from Articles 19(2) and 19(3) of Regulation (EU) 2019/943 concerning Use of Revenues obligations, for a period of 25 years from the start of commercial operations. In December 2020, Ofgem and CRE published a joint consultation document; this consultation was intended to close on 29 January 2021. In January 2021, the CRE and Ofgem announced that they had discontinued a public consultation for the AQUIND Interconnector, as this exemption request process is only available to interconnector projects developed between EU member states, the UK ceased to be a member state and the Brexit transition period had ended.

In October 2020, there was a protest against the project in Portsmouth.

In November 2020, Aquind won an appeal in the General Court of the European Union against the Agency for the Cooperation of Energy Regulators' (ACER) decision to reject an application for exemption pursuant to Article 17 of Regulation (EC) No 714/2009.

On 26 January 2021, the French authorities in Normandy refused to give the project the green light.

In March 2021, the examination by Portsmouth City Council closed.

In May 2021, there was another protest in Portsmouth. The Conservative MP for Portsmouth North, Penny Mordaunt, called the proposals "sinister". The Labour MP for Portsmouth South, Stephen Morgan, also voiced his opposition. The following month, Mordaunt handed in a petition against the project. Another protest was planned for July 2021.

A final decision by the British government on whether to permit construction was postponed several times. On 21 October 2021, the business secretary Kwasi Kwarteng set a new deadline of 21 January 2022 for deciding on the planning application.

After the decision in January 2021 by the French regional government in Normandy to refuse permission, the company stated that this "does not prevent AQUIND from securing the relevant French planning consents required to construct and operate AQUIND Interconnector".

In October 2021, after growing criticism, the company vowed to "continue the development of the AQUIND Interconnector project".

On 20 January 2022, Business Secretary Kwasi Kwarteng refused permission for the project, stating that he was not satisfied that "more appropriate alternatives to the proposed route" had been fully considered. In November 2022, that ruling by the Business Secretary was the subject of a judicial review at the High Court brought by Aquind Ltd. Justice Lieven has reserved her decision.

In January 2023, the decision by Kwasi Kwarteng to block the cable was overturned by judicial review. In March 2024 the UK Ministry of Defence raised security concerns if the project went ahead. In November 2024 the British regulator Ofgem decided to reject AQUINDs application for a cap and floor regime due to concerns with the negative effect of the project

In January 2025, Havant Borough Council voted on Cllr Antonia Harrison's motion to raise awareness of opposition to the project, seeking publicity to further that awareness and pressure the Secretary of State to make a decision. It was carried by all five parties.

Whilst some local MPs and the local campaign group Stop AQUIND reasserted their opposition to the plans, public support for the project has since been reported in a number of industry publications.
