= Marco Romano (politician) =

Swiss politician (born 1982)

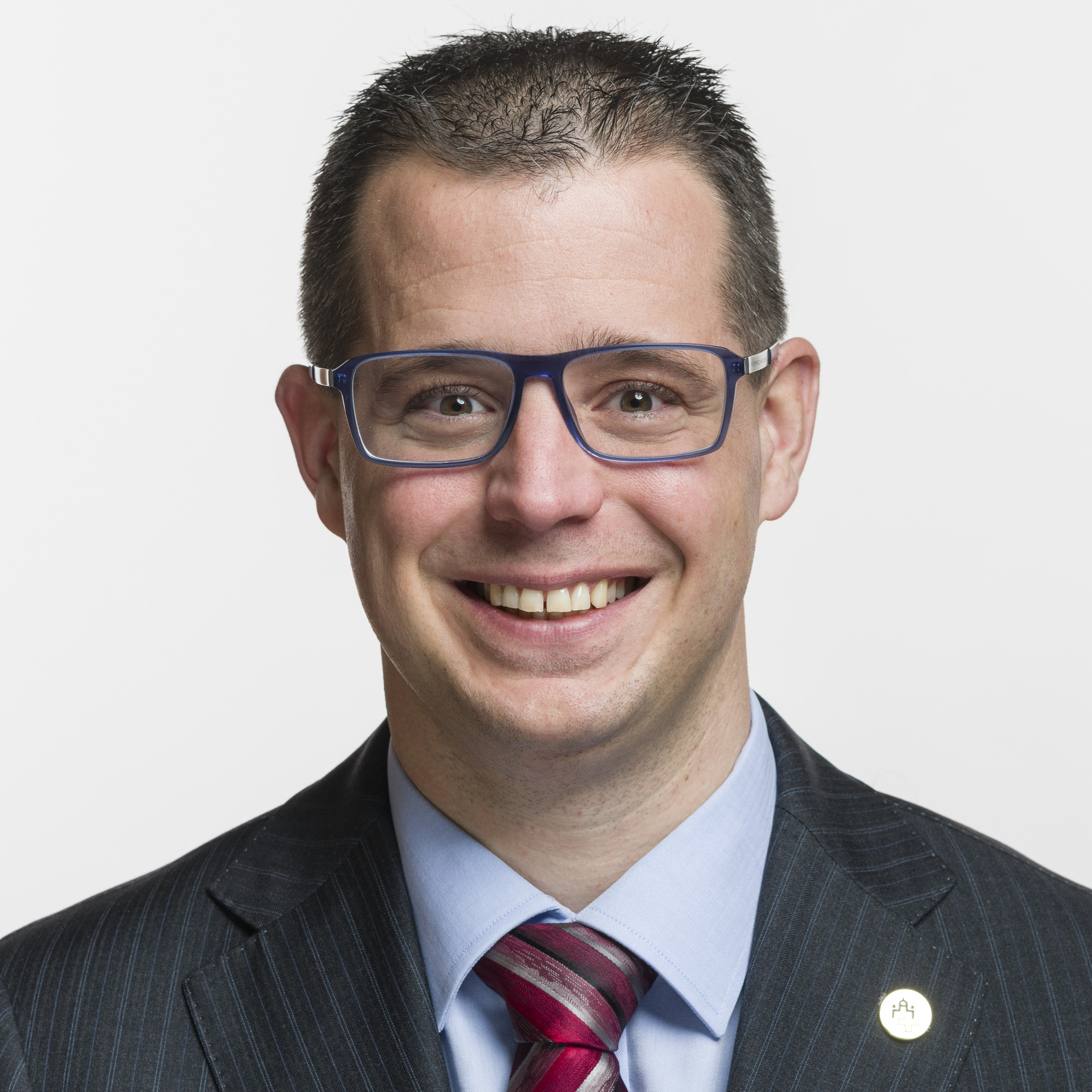
- Romano in 2019

Member of the National Council
- In office 5 December 2011 – 3 December 2023

Personal details
- Born: 6 November 1982 (age 43) Sorengo, Ticino, Switzerland
- Party: Christian Democratic People's Party
- Education: University of Bern
- Occupation: Politician

Marco Romano (born 6 November 1982) is a Swiss politician. Originally serving in both the legislative branch (2004–2016) and executive branch (2016–2020) of the Mendrisio municipal council, he was elected to the National Council in 2011 after a tie-breaking manual lottery; he served until 2023. He is now deputy director and head of health policy for health insurers association Prio.Swiss.

== Biography ==
=== Early life and career ===
Marco Romano, originally from Mendrisio, Ticino, was born on 6 November 1982 in nearby Sorengo. His father Pietro Romano was a Mendrisino municipal official who served as secretary of the Regional Transport Commission of Mendrisiotto and Basso Ceresio, and his mother is German. He studied at the University of Bern, where he obtained a degree in political science in 2006.

In April 2004, Romano joined the municipal council of Mendrisio, serving in the legislative branch until April 2016. He worked as a personal assistant to Ticino State Councillor Luigi Pedrazzini from 2006 to 2007. He also chaired the Finance, Economics, and Municipal Enterprises Department in Mendrisio's executive branch from April 2016 to 2020. Within the Christian Democratic People's Party (CVP), he served as secretary-general of their Ticino cantonal branch from 2007 to 2012, and as editor of the weekly house organ Popolo e Libertà.

Romano ran in the 2018 Mendrisio mayoral election, but despite being retiring incumbent Carlo Croci's successor as the CVP candidate, he lost to Free Democratic Party candidate Samuele Cavadini. He did not appear on his party list for that year's municipal elections, effectively putting his electoral focus on national politics.

=== National politics ===
Romano ran in the 2011 Swiss federal election as a candidate for one of the National Council's Ticino seats, where both he and Monica Duca Widmer received 23,979 votes. Initially, a computer program was used to draw lots and Duca Widmer was declared the winner. Following complaints and appeals, the Federal Supreme Court ruled against the Canton's decision to use a computer program for the lottery. A new manual lottery was conducted on 25 November and Romano emerged as the winner.

In the National Council, Romano chaired the drafting committee (2019–2021), the drafting committee for the Italian language (2019–2023), and the commission of political institutions (2021–2023), and served as group president of the Office of the National Council (2019–2021). He was also vice-president of the National Council's Centre Group coalition (consisting of the CVP, the Evangelical People's Party of Switzerland, and the Conservative Democratic Party of Switzerland). In 2017, he became chair of Ticino's National Council delegation.

Romano was a founding member of a Ticino committee opposed to the eventually successful 2021 Swiss same-sex marriage referendum. He chaired the Fondazione IPT's Ticino office from 2020 until 2024.

=== Post-political career and personal life ===
In April 2023, Romano announced that he would not be running for a fourth term in that year's federal election, citing his desire to spend time with his family. In April 2024, he was appointed deputy director and head of health policy of health insurers association Curafutura; following Curafutura's merger into Prio.Swiss, he carried these roles to the new organization in 2025.

Romano is bilingual in German and Italian, though he has some non-speaking understanding of French. As a member of the Swiss Armed Forces, Romano holds the rank of soldat.
