= Movement for Socialism (Switzerland) =

The Movement for Socialism (Italian: Movimento per il Socialismo, French: Mouvement pour le Socialisme, MpS; German: Bewegung für den Sozialismus, BfS) is a Swiss leftist political organisation founded in March 2002. It has observer status in the United Secretariat of the Fourth International. The MpS has 2 members in the Grand Council of Ticino as of 2023.

== History ==
The organisation was founded in 2002 amid the growth of the anti-globalization movement in Switzerland.

Its organizational roots lie in the Revolutionary Marxist League (RML), founded in 1969 and later renamed the Socialist Workers' Party (SAP). However, in contrast to its historical predecessors, the BFS does not explicitly describe itself as "Trotskyist".

== Political positions ==
The Movement for Socialism holds itself in the Marxist traditions of Rosa Luxemburg and the anti-Stalinist left, and describes itself as "anti-capitalist", "feminist", "internationalist", "anti-racist", "eco-socialist", "revolutionary", and "anti-authoritarian". The Movement for Socialism has points of contact with the Trotskyist movement in Switzerland in terms of both personnel and messaging as well.

== Activities ==
Every January in Zurich, the Movement for Socialism organizes "Das Andere Davos" (lit. 'The Other Davos'), a political counter-event to the World Economic Forum. The focus is on the networking of different social movements and an internationalist perspective on global problems.

It publishes the magazine Solidarietà in Ticino and the magazine antikap in German-speaking Switzerland.
