= Alice Moretti =

Swiss politician (1921–2022)

Member of the Grand Council of Ticino
- In office 1971–1987

Personal details
- Born: 19 June 1921 Melide, Switzerland
- Died: 6 February 2022 (aged 100) Paradiso, Switzerland
- Party: FDP

Alice Moretti (19 June 1921 – 6 February 2022) was a Swiss politician. A member of the Free Democratic Party of Switzerland, she was one of the first eleven women elected served on the Grand Council of Ticino from 1971 when Switzerland eventually granted women the federal vote. She was elected alongside Marili Terribilini-Fluck, Elsa Franconi-Poretti, Linda Brenni, Elda Marazzi, Ersilia Fossati, Dina Paltenghi-Gardosi, Dionigia Duchini, Rosita Genardini, Rosita Mattei and Ilda Rossi. She served until 1987.

Moretti died in Paradiso on 6 February 2022, at the age of 100.
