= Tito Tettamanti =

Swiss lawyer, politician and businessman

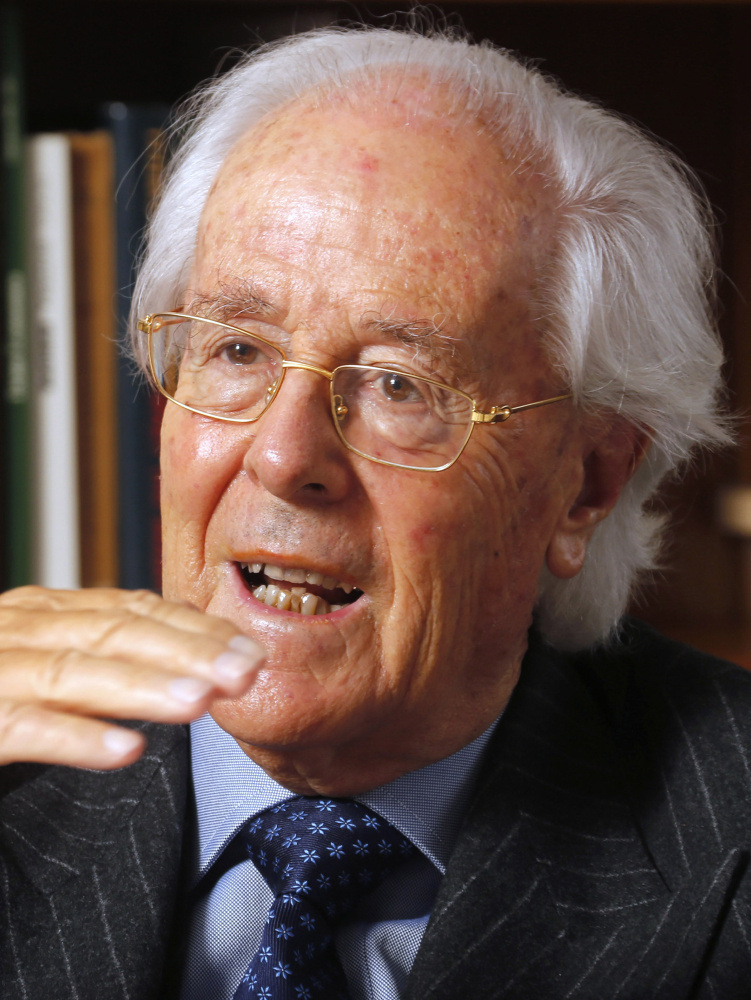

Counselor of State Ticino
- In office 1959–1960

Member of the Grand Council of Ticino
- In office 1955 – 1959

Personal details
- Born: Tito Tettamanti; 6 October 1930 (age 95) Lugano, Switzerland
- Party: Christian Democratic People's Party
- Spouse: Dolores Gilardi Cossi (m. 2001)
- Children: 3
- Education: University of Bern
- Occupation: Lawyer, businessman, financier, author, politician

Tito Tettamanti (Italian pronunciation: [ˈti.to tet.taˈman.ti]; born 6 October 1930) is a Swiss lawyer, businessman and politician who served as Council of State of Ticino briefly from 1959 to 1960, and previously on the Grand Council of Ticino from 1955 to 1959 for the Christian Democratic People's Party.

In 1960, Tettamanti founded Fidinam SA, which would become a multinational investment vehicle, initially in real estate in Ticino, later abroad, primarily in Canada. During Black Monday (1987), he acquired significant stakes in the Swiss industrial sector, primarily in Saurer, Sulzer and Rieter, as well as in media (Jean Frey AG).

His net worth is estimated at 950 million Swiss Francs (2018).

== Early life and education ==
Tettamanti was born 6 October 1930 in Lugano, Switzerland, the only child to Otto Tettamanti, a banker, and Maddalena Tettamanti (née Moccetti). During his upbringing monetary and professional success was highly encouraged by his parents.

He once referred to his upbringing as being a spoiled only child from a middle class background. He completed the Handelsmatura in Bellinzona in 1949 followed by completing a Juris Doctor at age 23 in 1953 graduating summa cum laude. In 1955, Tettamanti completed the bar entrance exam and became an appointed attorney and notary public.

== Professional career ==
In 1959 Tettamanti founded the law and notary firm Tettamanti-Spiess-Dotta and at the end of 1960 he founded the fiduciary company Fidinam SA, which initially assist

ed said law and notary firm Tettamanti-Spiess-Dotta in providing administrative and accounting services to its clients and later became one of the 10 most important Swiss fiduciary companies. He served as Managing Director of Fidinam for 25 years and today he holds the title of Honorary Chairman of the Fidinam Group.

In the 60's and 70's, he worked as a real estate investor, among others, in Ticino and Canada, and he collaborated with the Banca della Svizzera Italiana, of which he was an important shareholder. In the 80's, he transferred the center of his activities as an investor to New York, remaining active in Wall Street until 1987.

Afterwards, Tettamanti returned to Switzerland and specialized in the acquisition and management of large Swiss companies such as Sulzer, and Saurer (between 1988 and 1992 he was appointed president of the Saurer Group Holding AG and Saurer Group Investment Ltd, whereas in June 1994 he served as member of the board of directors and until 2000 as honorary president), Rieter, Ascom Holding, and SIG. In Spring 2010 Tettamanti acquired the Basler Zeitung, the main newspaper of the northwestern part of Switzerland, whose control was held, with a short interruption, until the final sale in 2014. From March 2002 to the end of 2006 Tettamanti was the largest shareholder of the Swiss publishing house Jean Frey AG, which was eventually sold to the Axel-Springer-Verlag.

From 13 December 2002 until 15 May 2006 Tettamanti served as member and Chairman of the Board of Directors of the pharmaceutical consultancy company Interpacific International Limited.

Tettamanti served as Chairman of the Board of Directors of Sterling Strategic Value Limited until 2012 and after that, he served as Honorary Chairman. In January 2017 Sterling Strategic Value Limited was converted into a Luxembourg alternative investment fund and Tettamanti still serves as Honorary Chairman. He has furthermore been Chairman of the Board of Directors of several companies including ST Group Holding Inc., ST Real Estate Holding Inc., and ST Services Holding Inc. and he is currently honorary Chairman of ST Real Estate Holding Inc., ST Australia Real Estate Inc., and ST USA Real Estate Inc.

Tettamanti is founder of the Swiss Civil Society Association and served as Chairman until 2013 and has also held the position of "Governor" and Vice President of the European Policy Forum in London. Since 2008 Tettamanti has been Chairman of the Fidinam Foundation, a nonprofit entity whose aim is to support initiatives in the fields of education, research, health, and various projects with social and economic needs background in Ticino and other regions of Switzerland. The Fidinam Foundation is under the supervision of the Swiss Federal Department of Internal Affairs. The board of the Fidinam Foundation is also composed of Massimo Pedrazzini, Roberto Grassi, Tiziano Moccetti, Alessandra Niedecker and Konrad Hummler. In addition, since 2009 Tettamanti has been Chairman of the Fidinam International Charity Foundation.

== Personal life ==
In 2001, Tettamanti thirdly married to Dolores Gilardi Cossi, a native of Uruguay.

After several years spent in London, since 2010 Tettamanti has lived in Lugano. He frequently participates in conferences, public discussions, TV, and radio programs. A dedicated scholar of political, cultural, and international economic issues, he writes regularly as a columnist in the Corriere del Ticino and Die Zeit, often dealing with socio-economic topics.

== Bibliography ==
Tettamanti is the author of several books. His works include Quale Europa?, published in 1993 by Giampiero Casagrande Editore in Italian (ISBN 88-7795-082-X), in German (ISBN 3-250-10229-6, ISBN 9783250102298) and in French (ISBN 2-84100-021-4). Together with Alfredo Bernasconi in 1996 he wrote Manifesto per una società liberale, published in German by Ammann Verlag, Zurich, (ISBN 3-250-10296-2) and in Italian in 1995 by Sperling & Kupfer, Milan, (ISBN 88-200-2103-X). In 2002 he was the author of The seven sins of the Capital, published by Sperling & Kupfer, Milan (ISBN 88-200-3484-0 ), which in its German version is named "Die sieben Sünden des Kapitals", Bilanz, Zurich, 2003 (ISBN 3-909167-94-2), in 2017 he was co-author of T contro T - Te lo do io il liberismo, published in Italian by Edizioni San Giorgio, Muzzano (ISBN 88-905-0701-2) and in 2018 he wrote Flash, published by Armando Dado' Editore, Locarno (ISBN 978-88-8281-506-6). In 2019 he wrote together with Alfonso Tuor the book named "T contro T - Disuguaglianza, disagio, democrazia" published in Italian by Edizioni San Giorgio, Muzzano (ISBN 978-88-90507-03-8). His last book named ''T contro T - Un mondo in crisi - rivolte o rivoluzione'' published in Italian by Edizioni San Giorgio, Muzzano (ISBN 978-88-90507-08-3), wrote together with Alfonso Tuor, was published in 2021.
