= Semyon Vainshtok =

Russian-Israeli industrialist (born 1947)

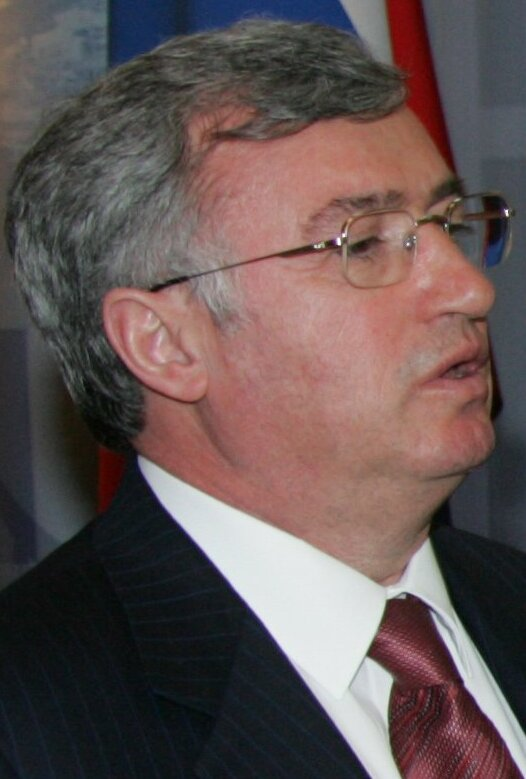
- Semyon Vainshtok in 2006
- Born: October 5, 1947 (age 78); Mogilev, Byelorussian SSR, Soviet Union
- Education: Kyiv National University of Construction and Architecture; Tyumen State Oil and Gas University
- Occupation: Industrialist
- Known for: Russian state owned oil executive

Semyon Mikhailovich Vainshtok (born October 5, 1947) is a Russian-Israeli industrialist, former head of the Russian state-controlled companies Transneft (1999–2007) and Olympstroy (2007–2008).

== Early life and education ==
Semyon Vainshtok was born on October 5, 1947, in Mogilev. In 1950, when he was three years old, his family relocated to Moldova. His father, Mikhail Semenovich, initially worked as a gas station attendant at a Machine and Tractor Station (MTS) in the village of Climăuți, located in the Dondușeni District. Later, he advanced to become the director of the oil depot in Dondușeni.

Vainshtok graduated from the Kyiv Civil Engineering Institute with a degree in civil engineering and later completed postgraduate studies at the Tyumen State Oil and Gas University.

== Career ==
From 1982, he was deputy head of the Povkhneft Oil and Gas Production Department and deputy general director of the Kogalymneftegaz Production Association of Glavtyumenneftegaz, USSR Ministry of the Oil Industry.

From 1988, he was deputy general director, and from 1993, general director of Lukoil-Kogalymneftegaz OJSC. From 1995 to 1999, he was Vice President of Lukoil and General Director of Lukoil - Western Siberia LLC.

From 1999 to September 11, 2007, Vainshtok was the president of Transneft, a member of the board of directors, and chairman of the management board. He oversaw the initial stage of the construction of the ESPO pipeline. Vainshtok emphasized his commitment to expanding oil exports eastward, even potentially at the expense of Western markets, stating that the West had been "overfed with oil." He also championed the construction of a pipeline to China, initially proposing a route along the shores of Lake Baikal, despite environmental concerns. This plan was later revised following Vladimir Putin's intervention to protect the environmentally sensitive area.

In November 2010, activist Alexei Navalny accused the former Transneft management of large-scale embezzlement during the project and demanded criminal prosecution of former top managers. Deputy Chairman of the Accounts Chamber of Russia, Valery Goreglyad] confirmed "serious violations," resulting in damages of about 3.5 billion rubles. However, Chairman Sergei Stepashin denied Navalny's claim of $4 billion stolen, stating that "after the violations were eliminated, the project was implemented quite well."

Upon the creation of Olympstroy, Vainshtok was appointed to lead preparations for the Sochi Olympics. From September 11, 2007 to April 17, 2008, he was president of the State Corporation for the Construction of Olympic Facilities and Development of Sochi as a Mountain Climatic Resort.

After leaving Olympstroy in 2008, Vainshtok moved to London, then in the spring of 2010, he moved to Israel. That same year, it was reported he had acquired Israeli citizenship. In August 2010, Vainshtok became chairman of the board of directors of the Israeli company Israel's Financial Levers ("Manofim Finansim Le-Israel").

== Recognition ==
- Order "For Merit to the Fatherland", 3rd class (July 10, 2008)
- Order "For Merit to the Fatherland", 4th class (May 19, 2003)
- Medal of the Order "For Merit to the Fatherland", 2nd class
- Medal "For the Development of Mineral Resources and Development of the Oil and Gas Complex of Western Siberia"
- Order of St. Sergius of Radonezh, 3rd class
