= Viktor Fedotov =

Russian-British businessman

- Born: 1947 (age 78–79); Ufa, Bashkortostan, Soviet Union
- Occupation: Businessman
- Known for: Donated more than £1 million to the UK Conservative Party

Viktor Fedotov (Russian: Виктор Федотов) is a Russian-British businessman. He was a vice-president of Lukoil in 1990-1998 and headed a number of other companies in the Russian oil industry, including the Caspian Pipeline Consortium. He is now the majority owner of Aquind, a company that plans to build a HVDC submarine power cable that would link France and England.

Aquind donated more than £1 million to the Conservative Party. After Fedotov's link with Aquind was discovered, the Conservative Party was criticised for accepting these donations by Angela Rayner, Labour’s deputy leader, and by Conservative MPs.

According to the Guardian, documents from Pandora Papers suggest that he was one of the owners of the Russian company VNIIST and "made at least $98m from an offshore financial structure that appears to have funnelled profits from VNIIST via multiple tax havens."

Fedotov owns a £7 million house in Hampshire.
