= Unaoil =

Monégasque oil company

- Type: Private
- Industry: Oil industry
- Founded: 1991
- Headquarters: La Rousse, Monaco
- Key people: Ahsani family

Unaoil is a Monaco-based company which provides "industrial solutions to the energy sector in the Middle East, Central Asia and Africa." Unaoil is incorporated in the British Virgin Islands, a tax haven with an opaque banking system.

== History ==
The company, which is run by the Ahsani family, was founded in 1991.

== Bribery Scandal ==
In 2010 Unaoil entered into an agreement with Leighton Holdings with the aim of securing a $500 million oil pipeline contract in Iraq. In 2011 Leighton Holdings referred the deal to the police as corruption. In 2014 a High Court of Justice judge queried the corruption claims after Unaoil denied them in a civil litigation matter involving Leighton Holdings. In 2016, the Serious Fraud Office (United Kingdom) (SFO) alleged before the High Court of Justice in a separate case brought by Unaoil that the firm was engaged in "extensive" corruption. Unaoil's litigation, in which it alleged the SFO had acted unlawfully, was dismissed by the High Court.

In March 2016, the SFO began investigating allegations Unaoil acting corruptly in facilitating business deals involving Rolls-Royce, Halliburton-KBR, Petrofac, ABB, Leighton Holdings and Amec Foster Wheeler.

In the United States, KBR, FMC Technologies and Core Laboratories all disclosed in 2016 that they had been contacted by the Department of Justice (DOJ) in connection with a probe of Unaoil.

The SFO and DOJ inquiries followed media reports that Unaoil allegedly facilitated extensive corruption and bribery in the oil industry. A leaked cache of Unaoil internal company emails dating from 2001 to 2012 were the subject of a series of articles published by Fairfax Media investigative reporters Nick McKenzie, Richard Baker and Michael Bachelard in the Australian newspaper The Age, and The Huffington Post in March 2016. Under headlines such as "Unaoil: World's Biggest Bribe Scandal" and "Unaoil: Company that Bribed the World", The Age wrote that "How they make their money is simple. Oil-rich countries often suffer poor governance and high levels of corruption. Unaoil's business plan is to play on the fears of large Western companies that they cannot win contracts without its help. Its operatives then bribe officials in oil-producing nations to help these clients win government-funded projects. The corrupt officials might rig a tender committee. Or leak inside information. Or ensure a contract is awarded without a competitive tender".

In Iraq, Unaoil was alleged to have paid "multi-million dollar lump sums" to senior politicians. Other oil producing countries that Unaoil have operated in include Iran, Libya, Syria, Yemen, Kuwait, and the UAE.

In March 2016 the Sydney Morning Herald published a letter from a legal representative of Unaoil in which the allegations of corruption and bribery are denied.

On 31 March 2016, Monaco authorities announced that they had raided the offices of Unaoil and the homes of some of its executives, following an urgent request for assistance from the SFO. The statement said, "These searches and interviews were carried out in the presence of British officials as part of a vast, international corruption scandal implicating numerous foreign oil industry firms. The information collected is going to be examined by the British authorities as part of their investigation." The UK National Crime Agency carried out their investigation in collaboration with the Australian Federal Police and the Federal Bureau of Investigation.

On 27 February 2017, an article in the News Corp-owned The Australian presented an alternative perspective on the Unaoil bribery scandal. This claimed that the Fairfax Media newspapers had settled claims made against them regarding false allegations and indicated that "within weeks, the publisher will be confronted with yet another legal action, this time from the company at the centre of the allegations that triggered these backdowns. That company is Unaoil, a Monaco-based business that is a player in the international oil industry and is owned by the Ashani family." The article claimed that the leaker of the company emails was an extortionist who had hacked Unaoil, and stated that Unaoil would seek through court to identify the sources for the 2016 articles. The Australian had previously reported Unaoil's denials of the allegations, and accusation that it was the victim of extortion, on 17 May 2016.

In November 2016, the UK Treasury announced it was giving the SFO 'blockbuster funding' to resource the agency's Unaoil probe. That same month, a former Unaoil country manager told the BBC's Panorama programme he had bribed a Libyan government official. The whistleblower, Lindsay Mitchell, said that in 2009 he handed an envelope filled with US dollars to a manager at a subsidiary of the state-owned Libyan National Oil Company.

In January 2017, the DOJ announced in a statement that Rolls-Royce had agreed to pay a $170 million fine to settle corruption allegations involving its use of several facilitators to win contracts, including Unaoil.

Ongoing investigations by the SFO were reported in April 2017. In May 2017, listed UK company Petrofac suspended a top executive in connection to the Unaoil investigation.

On March 25, 2019, CEO Cyrus Ahsani and COO Saman Ahsani pled guilty for their roles in a scheme to corruptly facilitate millions of dollars in bribe payments to officials in multiple countries.

=== Corruption charges laid by Serious Fraud Office ===
On 17 November 2017, the Serious Fraud Office charged two former Unaoil Iraq managers with conspiring to pay bribes to win Dutch company SBM Offshore contracts in Iraq. The Iraq officials allegedly bribed were not named. The SFO also issued extradition proceedings against Unaoil Chief Operations Officer Saman Ahsani.

On 30 July 2020 Stephen Whiteley, the company's former territory manager for Iraq was sentenced to 3 years in prison. Ziad Akle, another former Iraq territory manager, received 5 years in prison. In December 2021 the UK Court of Appeal overturned the bribery conviction of a Ziad Akle after finding that the U.K.'s Serious Fraud Office committed a "serious failure" in refusing to turn over evidence that would have helped him at trial.

In December 2021, the Court of Appeal quashed the conviction of Unaoil’s former territory manager for Iraq Ziad Akle after the SFO disclosed evidence of ‘wholly inappropriate’ contacts with David Tinsley, a former US Drug Enforcement Administration agent who acted on behalf of the Ahsanis.

In March 2022 a second man convicted in Britain over the Unaoil case had his conviction overturned on the same basis as Ziad Akle. The ruling piles more pressure on SFO director Lisa Osofsky one month after UK Attorney General Suella Braverman appointed former Director of Public Prosecutions and High Court judge David Calvert-Smith to lead a "forensic and robust" review into SFO failings in the case.

In June 2022 it was reported that Stephen Whiteley, another former Unaoil Manager also had launched an appeal against his conviction, based on the two quashed convictions in the same matter. This was commented as a further blow to the SFO’s investigation.

On 21 July 2022 the Review led by Sir David Calvert Smith was published. The review was criticizing the conduct of SFO's head in leading the Unaoil Investigation: "It is clear that [Lisa] Osofsky was faced with a difficult situation very early in her tenure and made a number of mistakes and misjudgements which, with the benefit of hindsight, she now accepts." Calvert-Smith said further that Osofsky "was not supposed to be personally involved in contact" with a fixer, who had no recognised legal role in the so called Unaoil case. Labour Shadow Attorney General Emily Thornberry MP stated that the report "lays bare a catalogue of woeful mismanagement and inexplicable misjudgements at the top of the SFO".
