= Alexander Temerko =

Soviet-born British businessman

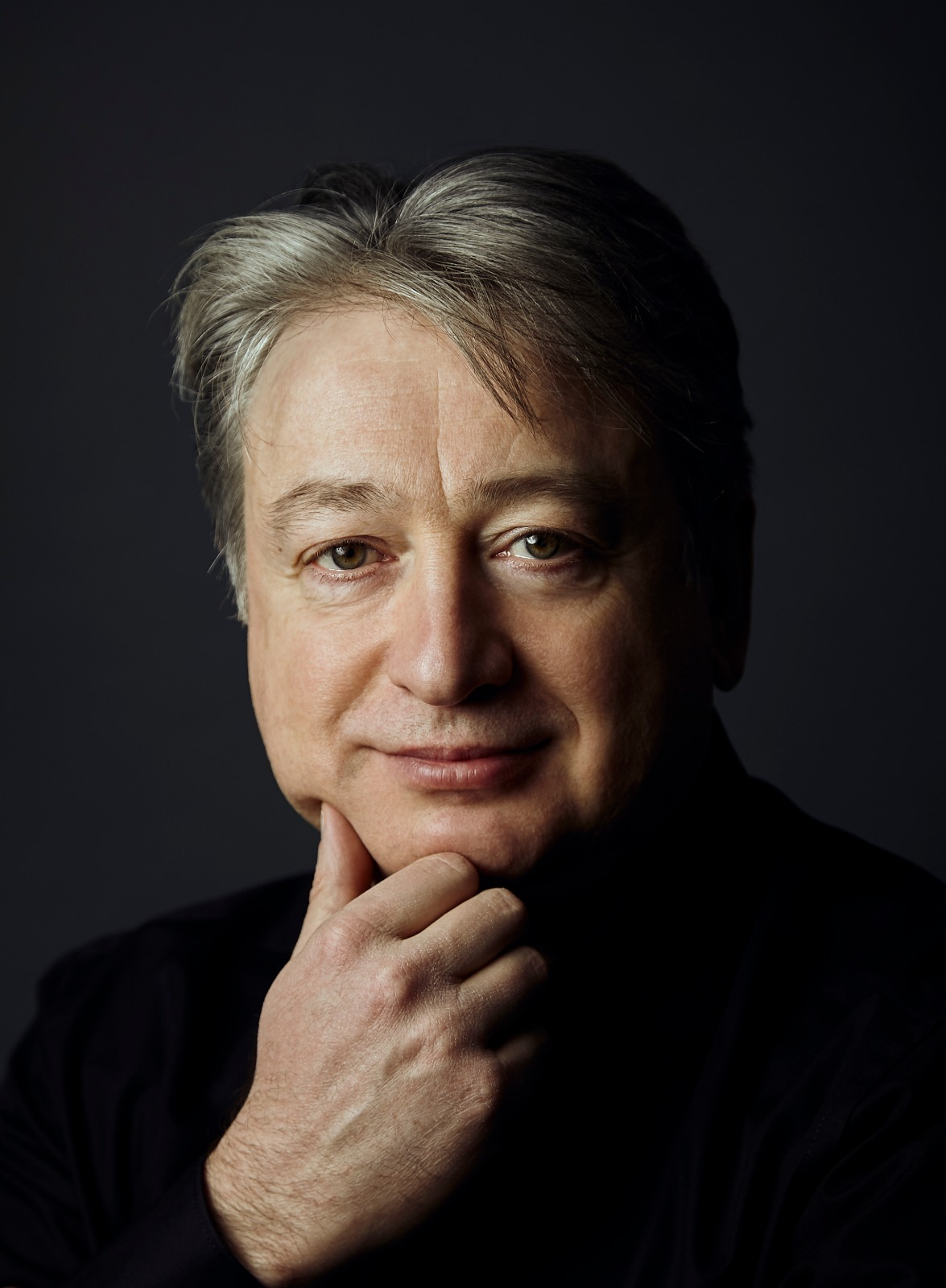
Alexander Temerko

Alexander Viktorovich Temerko (born 9 September 1966) is a Ukrainian businessman in the energy sector, currently a director of the British company Aquind Limited. Previously, he was director and deputy chairman of the British company OGN Group. While in Russia, he held senior posts in the Russian Defence Ministry in the 1990s and, from 1999, was a senior executive and director at the Russian oil and gas company Yukos. He has resided in the United Kingdom since 2004. He became a British citizen in 2011.

Temerko is a member and advocate of the UK Conservative Party. He has donated more than £1.3 million to the party. He is also a member of the advisory council of right-wing think tank the Institute of Economic Affairs. In November 2019, he called for the publication of the Intelligence and Security Committee of Parliament′s report ("The Russia report") on Russian influence in British politics. In connection with the report, Temerko has denied he has ties with the Kremlin.

== Biography ==
Temerko was born in the Ukrainian Soviet Socialist Republic (present-day Ukraine, then a part of the Soviet Union) on 9 September 1966.

In 1987, he graduated from the Moscow Institute of Electronic Machine Building (MIEM). He also graduated from the Institute of Public Administration in 1999. He began his career in the field of environmental science, initially as the chief engineer of capital construction at the State Committee of the USSR on Environmental Protection, and then as director of the Department of Environmental Protection under the Ministry of Forestry.

During the events preceding the dissolution of the USSR, Temerko became a prominent figure in the team of Boris Yeltsin.

From early 1992, he held a series of positions in Russian state agencies under the Defence Ministry in charge of supplies and armaments.

From 1999, he held executive positions in the Russian oil company Yukos. In 2003, upon the arrest of Yukos CEO Mikhail Khodorkovsky, Temerko became the company's vice president. He was in charge of interaction with state bodies. He resigned from the post on 15 March 2005.

Temerko also served as a Director and vice chairman of the Newcastle-based OGN Group, a provider of engineering and construction services in offshore oil and gas and renewable energy companies. Among its clients were Apache, EnQuest, ConocoPhillips and others. The company management publicly called the UK government to support British supply chain in the oil and gas and renewable developments.

In 2016, Temerko was appointed as a director at Aquind, which mounted a bid that was later rejected to build a $1.4 billion power link between the United Kingdom and France, with power equivalent to 5% or 3% of British and French consumption respectively.

== Flight to London, criminal prosecution and extradition case ==
Temerko fled to London shortly after he was examined by criminal investigators in October 2004. In May 2005, Russian prosecutors charged Temerko with having stolen shares in the oil company Yeniseineftegaz, forgery, and perverting the course of justice.

Russia's bid to have Temerko extradited from the United Kingdom failed as Judge Timothy Workman in December 2005 ruled: "I have come to the conclusion that the motivation for the charges against Mr Temerko are inextricably entwined with the motivation for the prosecution of Mr Khodorkovsky. I therefore find that the prosecution of Mr Temerko is politically motivated and the request for his extradition is made for the purpose of prosecuting or punishing him on account of his political opinions."

Temerko himself alleged that the motivation of the Russian state's assault on Yukos was president Vladimir Putin's desire to silence those who challenged him politically. The ruling on his extradition case was in line with a dozen other similar cases of former Yukos employees who absconded to the UK.

== Views and political activism in the UK ==
Temerko's views on Russia's economy and the Yukos affair were cited by the Financial Times in the late 2000s. He himself contributed articles on the Russian oil industry developments to outlets such as The Observer and The Wall Street Journal.

Temerko is a member of, and major donor to, the British Conservative Party where he is a member of the Leader's Group. He also actively supports local Party associations in the North-East England where his company is based and Cities of London & Westminster association where his office and residence are located. He has commented on the impact that developments in politics and business would have on the North-East, in particular regarding the North Sea.

Temerko is a member of Carlton Club, a private member's club in London, where he donated a £90,000 bust of David Cameron.

Temerko regularly criticizes President Vladimir Putin of Russia and his policies in the media, including over the Russo-Ukrainian war.

During the 2014 Scottish independence referendum, Temerko publicly supported the campaign for Scotland to remain in the United Kingdom. He has publicly voiced his support for Britain to remain in the European Union. After the Referendum, Temerko advocated for a soft Brexit or even a general election, rather than a "no-deal" Brexit. Le Monde quoted Temerko as stating that the most sensible solution for London would be to stop the Brexit process and support the French through reforming the European Union. In August 2019, Temerko suggested that an extension of Article 50 or a second referendum were the only options to avoid the "unfolding travesty" of a no-deal exit on 31 October.

During the 2019 Conservative leadership campaign, Temerko supported Jeremy Hunt. The Daily Telegraph quoted Temerko as saying that the other leading candidate, and subsequent leader of the Conservative Party, Boris Johnson, remained a "friend", but he was being "held hostage" by the European Research Group of Brexiteer MPs. Temerko was also quoted by the Huffington Post as saying that the choice between Hunt and Johnson was one of "populism" against "professionalism".

He has advocated for greater support for British manufacturers. Temerko has particularly emphasised the role of interconnectors in the energy market in spite of Brexit proceedings, due to the increased volatility caused by increased reliance on renewable sources.

In July 2019, Temerko was quoted by Reuters, based on a series of interviews with him conducted in the course of three years, as applauding Brexit, endorsing Boris Johnson's bid to lead Britain out of the EU, lauding senior Russian security officials (including the current and former heads of the Federal Security Service such as Nikolai Patrushev), and proudly recalling his past work with Russia's Defence Ministry during the Yeltsin era.

== AQUIND Interconnector planning rejection ==
The AQUIND Interconnector is a proposed HVDC power link between the United Kingdom and France. On 20 January 2022, the UK Business Secretary refused consent for the proposal, citing concerns including the impact on the local community facilities at the location of the UK connection point, and the alternative possibilities at other sites.

Temerko later described Minister of State for Trade Policy Penny Mordaunt, who had represented constituents concerns with the development, as an "absolutely uncontrollable woman" and a "threat to national security". Mordaunt subsequently said the Conservative Party's code of conduct should apply to all members including donors, and suggested that party colleagues should not accept funds from Temerko. Aquind and Temerko had donated £1.1 million to the Conservative Party, including to 21 MPs and ministers.

In January 2023, Aquind won a judicial review against the Secretary of State's previous decision, returning the project's planning permission to consideration by the Department of Energy Security and Net Zero.

== Awards ==
Temerko has received Witte's gold medal "For Thoughts and Deeds", established by the Congress of Russian Business People. He received the medal of For Merit to the Fatherland of II degree and the Defender of Free Russia in 1993, and was also formally recognised and thanked by the president of the Russian Federation for his contribution towards ensuring the holding of the 100th conference of the Inter-Parliamentary Union in 1998.
