= Ahsani family =

Monaco-based business family of Iranian origin

The Ahsani family
- Current region: Monaco, United Kingdom
- Origin: Iran
- Estate: Unaoil

The Ahsani family are a prominent Monaco-based business family of Iranian origin. The family is headed by Ata Ahsani. Ata and his two sons Cyrus and Saman run the energy industry consultancy Unaoil; his third son, Sassan, heads the British property company Lumina Real Estate Capital.

The Aria Trust is the family trust of the Ahsani family. In 2007 the trust held €63 million in bank accounts and private equity with its international property holdings in Monaco, France, the United States and London having an estimated value of €130 million. The Ahsani family have a charitable organisation, Unakids. The Ahsani family control shell companies in the tax havens of the Channel Islands, the Marshall Islands, and the British Virgin Islands, through which Unaoil's business is conducted. In March 2016 The Age described Unaoil as "the unseen intermediary in massive deals between the world's biggest energy companies and notoriously corrupt governments in the Middle East, Eastern Europe and Africa." The family’s portfolio of real estate includes German nursing homes, and properties in multiple countries.

On 31 October 2019, Cyrus and Saman Ahsani pleaded guilty to conspiring to facilitate bribes on behalf of multinational firms to secure oil and gas contracts. They laundered money in order to conceal the bribes and caused the destruction of evidence to obstruct investigators in the US and elsewhere, according to US prosecutors.

== Family members ==
Ata Ahsani was born in 1940 in Kerman, Iran, and later studied engineering in England and the United States before working for an oil company in Iran. Ata Ahsani left Iran for the United Kingdom in the wake of the 1979 Iranian Revolution, and established Unaoil in 1990.

Cyrus Ahsani is Ata Ahsani’s oldest son. He is the treasurer of Monaco's Ambassador's Club, the club is headed by Prince Albert II of Monaco.

Saman Ahsani was born in December 1973. He was formerly a Trustee of the Iran Heritage Foundation. Ata Ahsani's third son, Sassan Ahsani (born January 1978), is based in London and is the head of Lumina Real Estate Capital, a property investment company. Ata Ahsani was a shareholder in Lumina between 2012 and 2016.

== Bribery scandal ==
Cyrus and Saman Ahsani pled guilty on March 25, 2019 to conspiring to facilitate bribes on behalf of multinational firms to secure oil and gas contracts.

Hundreds of thousands of emails sent within Unaoil and between members of the Ahsani family from 2001 to 2012 were leaked to investigative journalists and formed the basis for a series of reports in Fairfax Media's The Age and Sydney Morning Herald newspapers and the Huffington Post in March 2016.

From approximately 1999 to 2016, the Ahsanis conspired with others, including multiple companies and individuals, to make millions of dollars in bribe payments to government officials in Algeria, Angola, Azerbaijan, the Democratic Republic of Congo, Iran, Iraq, Kazakhstan, Libya and Syria, according to US prosecutors.
