= Fidinam =

Multinational consultancy founded in Switzerland

- Founded: 1960; 65 years ago
- Founder: Tito Tettamanti
- Headquarters: Switzerland
- Area served: Europe; Asia; Africa; Australia
- Key people: Roberto Grassi

Fidinam is a multinational private consultancy company, which was founded in 1960 in Switzerland by Swiss lawyer, politician, and entrepreneur Tito Tettamanti, currently the Honorary Chairman of the Group. Fidinam is based in Ticino (Switzerland) and with an established team of c. 250 professionals has offices in Europe, Asia, Africa, and Australia. The CEO of Fidinam is Roberto Grassi.

== Locations ==
Fidinam offices are located in Lugano (headquarters), Bellinzona, Mendrisio, Zurich, Geneva, Milan, Barcelona, Luxembourg, Principality of Monaco, Hong Kong, Dubai, Sydney, Singapore, Ho Chi Minh City, and Ebene (Mauritius).
