= Grand Council of Ticino =

Parliament of the canton of Ticino, Switzerland

Grand Council of Ticino Gran Consiglio di Ticino

Type
- Type: Unicameral

Leadership
- President: Fabio Schnellmann, PLR since 19 May 2025
- First Vice-President: Daria Lepori, PS since 19 May 2025
- Second Vice-President: Giovanni Berardi, The Centre since 19 May 2025

Structure
- Seats: 90
- Political groups: FDP/PLR (21) The Centre (16); Ticino League (14); SP/PS (12); SVP/UDC (9); Greens (5); Avanti con Ticino y Lavoro (3); Più Donne (2); GLP/PVL (2); Communist Party (2); BfS/MpS (2) HelvEthica (2)

Elections
- Voting system: Canton-wide proportional representation
- Last election: 2 April 2023
- Next election: 2027

Meeting place
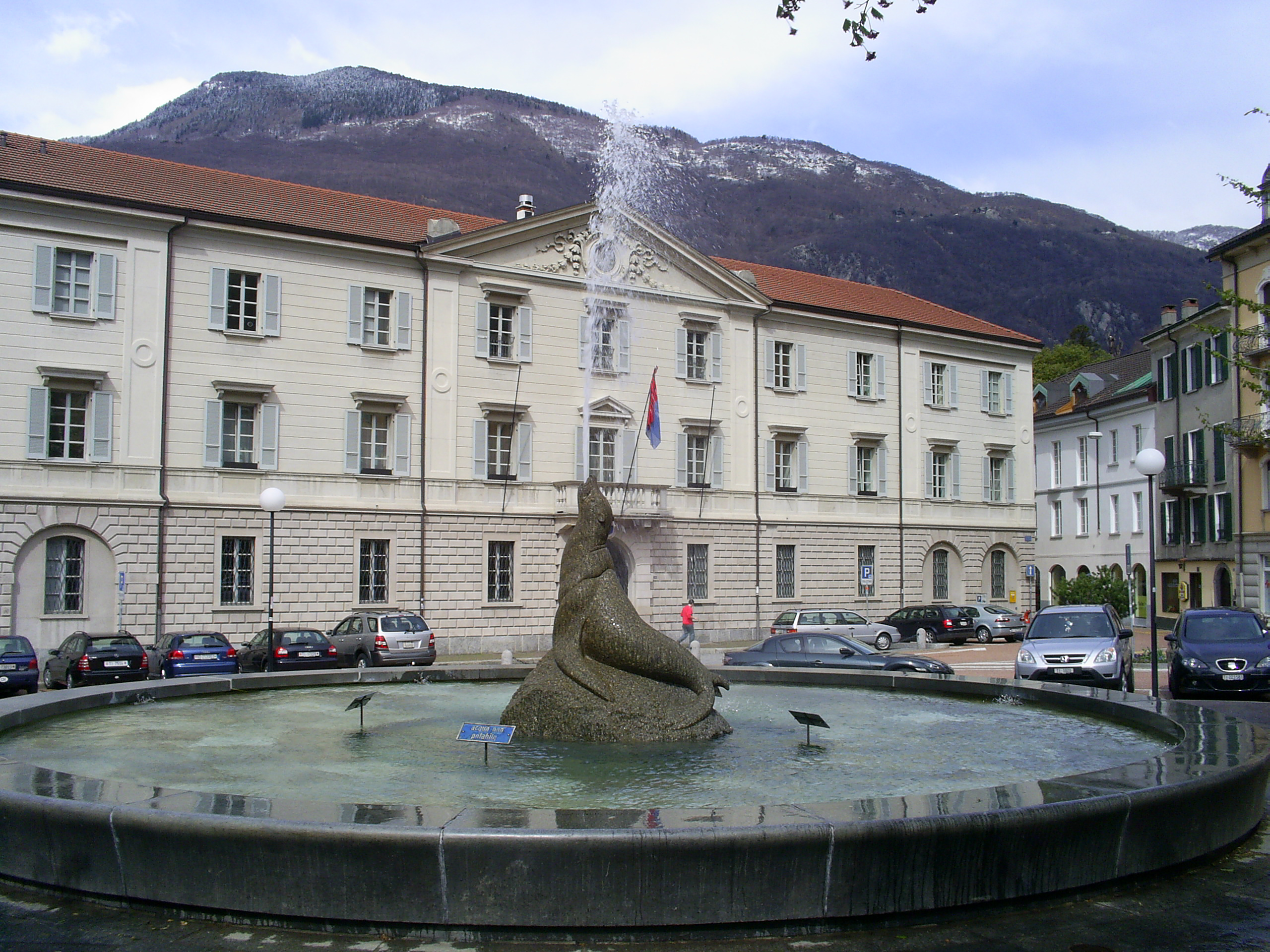
- Palazzo delle Orsoline, Bellinzona

The Grand Council of Ticino (Italian: Gran Consiglio di Ticino) is the legislature for the Swiss canton of Ticino. The 90-member council is elected every four years by proportional representation in a single constituency comprising the citizens resident in the canton, and meets at the Ursoline Palace in the capital, Bellinzona. Members are called deputies (deputati).

Elections coincide with those of the canton's executive body, the Council of State. The last elections were in 2023. The president and two vice-presidents are selected by the members of the Grand Council, and not the electorate. Minutes of meetings are made public.

The Grand Council appoints the members of the canton's judiciary (save for justices of the peace, who are elected in their area by the citizens) and public prosecutors.

== Composition ==
- Liberal Radical Party (Partito Liberale Radicale, PLR): 24
- Ticino League (Lega dei Ticinesi, Lega): 22
- Democratic People's Party (Partito Popolare Democratico, PPD): 17
- Swiss Socialist Party (Partito Socialista Svizzero, PSS): 13
- The Greens (I Verdi): 6
- Democratic Union of the Centre (Unione Democratica di Centro, UDC): 5
- Communist Party (Partito Comunista, PC): 2
- Mountain Party (Partito della Montagna): 1
- Groups

== Building ==
Both the Ticinese Council of State and the Grand Council meet at the Ursuline Palace. The palace was first built as a convent in 1738 for Ursuline nuns. The legislative and executive organs first convened in the palace on 20 May 1803, the year of the canton's admission to the confederation, at a Benedictine monastery. On 26 August 1803, the first session was held. In 1848, the Law on the Suppression of Monasteries forced the Ursuline nuns to leave, and the premises have been solely occupied by the legislative and executives organs of the canton of Ticino since.

The first eleven women were elected to the Grand Council of Ticino in 1971 – they were Ersilia Fossati, Marili Terribilini-Fluck, Elsa Franconi-Poretti, Linda Brenni, Elda Marazzi, Alice Moretti, Dina Paltenghi-Gardosi, Dionigia Duchini, Rosita Genardini, Rosita Mattei and Ilda Rossi.
