= Massachusetts Senate's 2nd Plymouth and Bristol district =

American legislative district

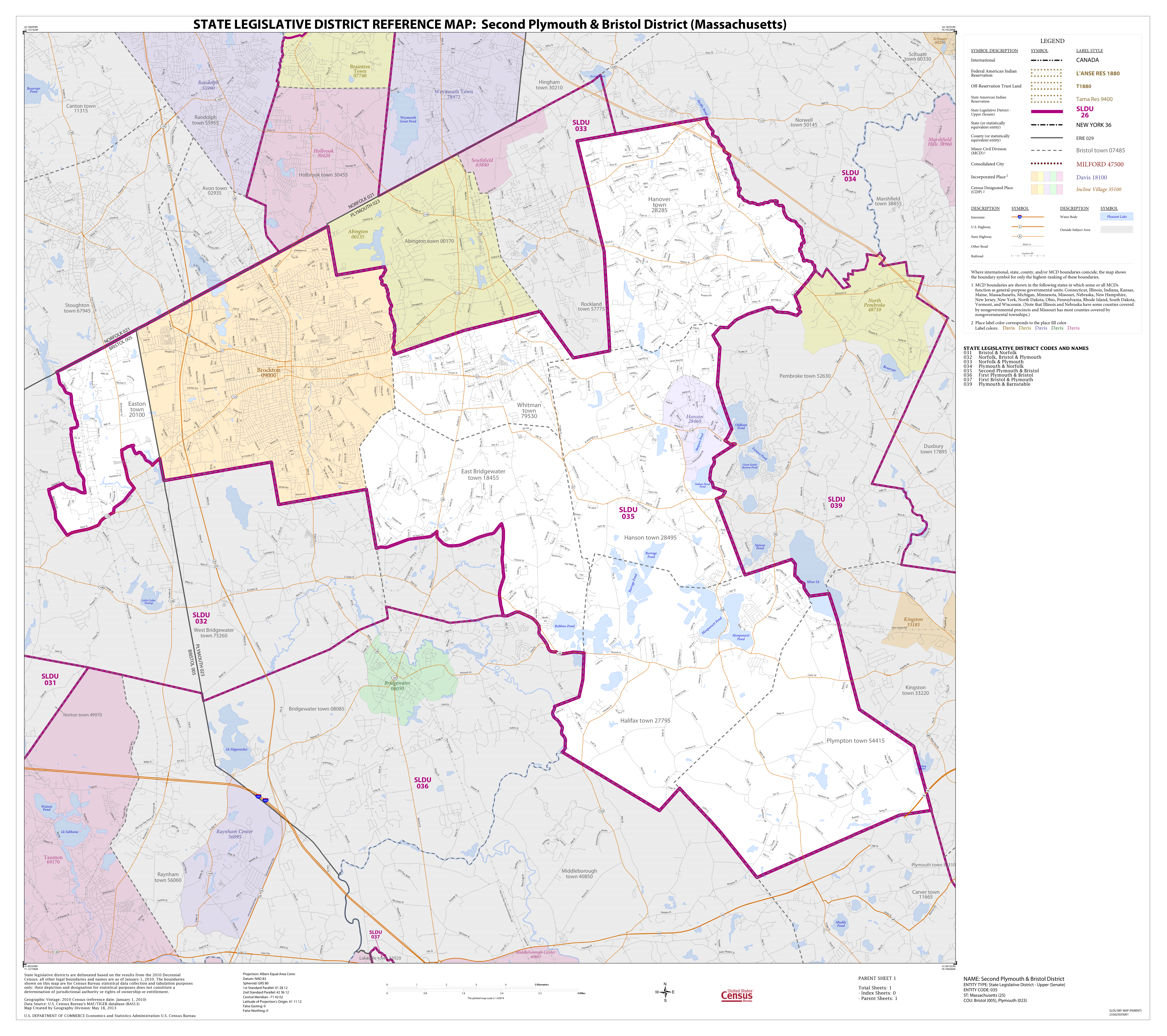
Map of Massachusetts Senate's 2nd Plymouth and Bristol district, based on the 2010 United States census.

Massachusetts Senate's 2nd Plymouth and Bristol district in the United States is one of 40 legislative districts of the Massachusetts Senate. It covers 1.4% of Bristol County and 31.0% of Plymouth County population in 2010. Democrat Michael Brady of Brockton has represented the district since 2015. Candidates running for this district seat in the 2020 Massachusetts general election include Moises Rodrigues.

== Towns represented ==
The district includes the following localities:

- Brockton
- parts of East Bridgewater
- parts of Easton
- Halifax
- Hanover
- Hanson
- Plympton
- Whitman

== Senators ==
- Michael C. Creedon, 1995–1997
- Robert S. Creedon Jr., 1997–2008
- Thomas P. Kennedy, 2009–2015
- Michael D. Brady, 2015-current

== See also ==
- List of Massachusetts Senate elections
- List of Massachusetts General Courts
- List of former districts of the Massachusetts Senate
- Bristol County districts of the Massachusetts House of Representatives: 1st, 2nd, 3rd, 4th, 5th, 6th, 7th, 8th, 9th, 10th, 11th, 12th, 13th, 14th
- Plymouth County districts of the Massachusetts House of Representatives: 1st, 2nd, 3rd, 4th, 5th, 6th, 7th, 8th, 9th, 10th, 11th, 12th

== Images ==
Portraits of legislators

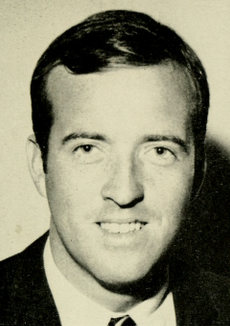
Robert S. Creedon Jr.

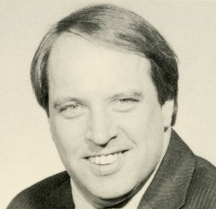
Thomas Patrick Kennedy
