= Massachusetts Senate's 1st Plymouth and Bristol district =

American legislative district

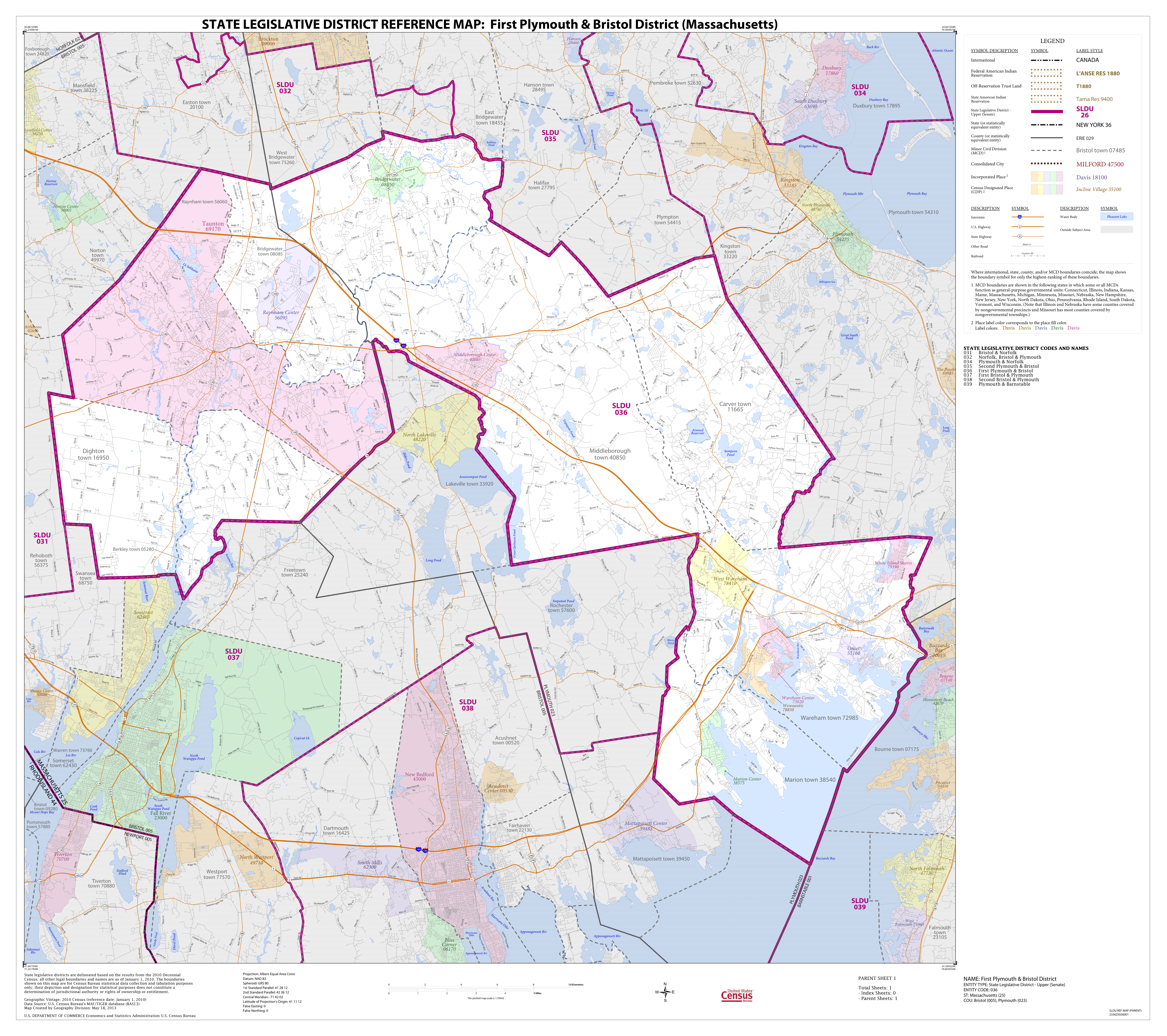
Map of Massachusetts Senate's 1st Plymouth and Bristol district, based on the 2010 United States census.

Massachusetts Senate's 1st Plymouth and Bristol district in the United States is one of 40 legislative districts of the Massachusetts Senate. It covers 15.1% of Bristol County and 17.8% of Plymouth County population. Republican Kelly Dooner of Taunton has represented the district since 2025.

== Locales represented ==
The district includes the following localities:

- Berkley
- Bridgewater
- Carver
- Dighton
- Marion
- Middleborough
- Raynham
- Taunton
- Wareham

== Senators ==
- Marc R. Pacheco, 1993-2025
- Kelly Dooner, 2025-current

== See also ==
- List of Massachusetts Senate elections
- List of Massachusetts General Courts
- List of former districts of the Massachusetts Senate
- Bristol County districts of the Massachusetts House of Representatives: 1st, 2nd, 3rd, 4th, 5th, 6th, 7th, 8th, 9th, 10th, 11th, 12th, 13th, 14th
- Plymouth County districts of the Massachusetts House of Representatives: 1st, 2nd, 3rd, 4th, 5th, 6th, 7th, 8th, 9th, 10th, 11th, 12th
