= Massachusetts Senate's 1st Bristol and Plymouth district =

American legislative district

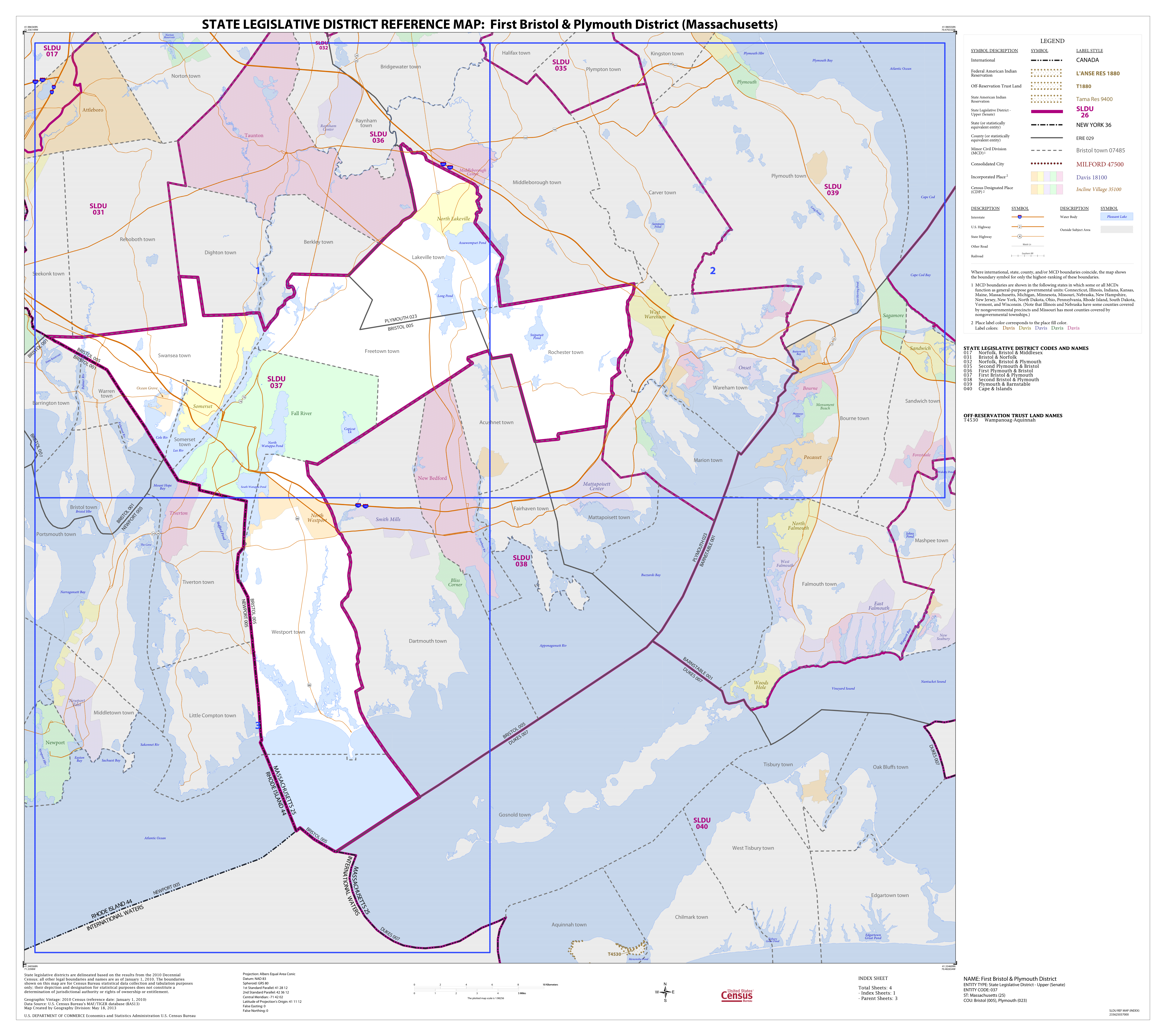
Map of Massachusetts Senate's 1st Bristol and Plymouth district, based on the 2010 United States census.

Massachusetts Senate's 1st Bristol and Plymouth district in the United States is one of 40 legislative districts of the Massachusetts Senate. It covers 26.9% of Bristol County and 3.2% of Plymouth County population. Democrat Michael Rodrigues of Westport has represented the district since 2011.

== Locales represented ==
The district includes the following localities:

- Fall River
- Freetown
- Lakeville
- Rochester
- Somerset
- Swansea
- Westport

The current district geographic boundary overlaps with those of the Massachusetts House of Representatives' 4th Bristol, 5th Bristol, 6th Bristol, 7th Bristol, 8th Bristol, 10th Bristol, and 12th Bristol districts.

== List of senators ==
Senator	Party	Years	Electoral history
District created in 2002.
Joan Menard	Democratic	2003 – 2011	Redistricted from the 1st Bristol district. Re-elected in 2002. Re-elected in 2004. Re-elected in 2006. Re-elected in 2008. Retired.
Michael J. Rodrigues	Democratic	2011–	Elected in 2010. Re-elected in 2012. Re-elected in 2014. Re-elected in 2016. Re-elected in 2018. Re-elected in 2020.

== See also ==
- List of Massachusetts Senate elections
- List of Massachusetts General Courts
- List of former districts of the Massachusetts Senate
- Bristol County districts of the Massachusetts House of Representatives: 1st, 2nd, 3rd, 4th, 5th, 6th, 7th, 8th, 9th, 10th, 11th, 12th, 13th, 14th
- Plymouth County districts of the Massachusetts House of Representatives: 1st, 2nd, 3rd, 4th, 5th, 6th, 7th, 8th, 9th, 10th, 11th, 12th
