= Antone S. Aguiar Jr. =

American judge and politician

Antone Aguiar
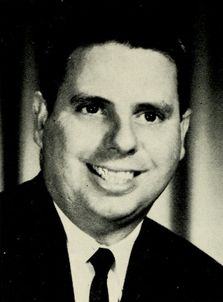

Member of the Massachusetts House of Representatives
- In office 1965–1982
- Preceded by: Ernest L. Goff Jr.
- Succeeded by: Philip Travis
- Constituency: 5th Bristol district (1965–69); 10th Bristol district (1969–75); 13th Bristol district (1975–79); 4th Bristol district (1979–82)

Swansea Town Selectman
- In office 1961–1969

Personal details
- Born: January 2, 1930 Fall River, Massachusetts
- Died: February 1, 2014 (aged 84) Fall River, Massachusetts
- Party: Democratic
- Spouse: Gertrud Aguiar
- Education: Yale University; Georgetown Law School
- Occupation: Lawyer, Politician; Judge, Civil servant

Antone S. Aguiar Jr. (January 2, 1930 – February 1, 2014) was an American judge and politician. He spent 18 years as a judge in the Attleboro District Court and two in the Fall River District Court before retiring in late 1999. He previously served in the Massachusetts House of Representatives from 1965 until 1982, when he was appointed to the bench by Governor Edward King. He was a Democrat who spent much of his life in Swansea, Massachusetts, where he graduated from Joseph Case High School in 1948.

== See also ==
- 1965–1966 Massachusetts legislature
- 1977–1978 Massachusetts legislature
