= Massachusetts House of Representatives' 10th Bristol district =

American legislative district

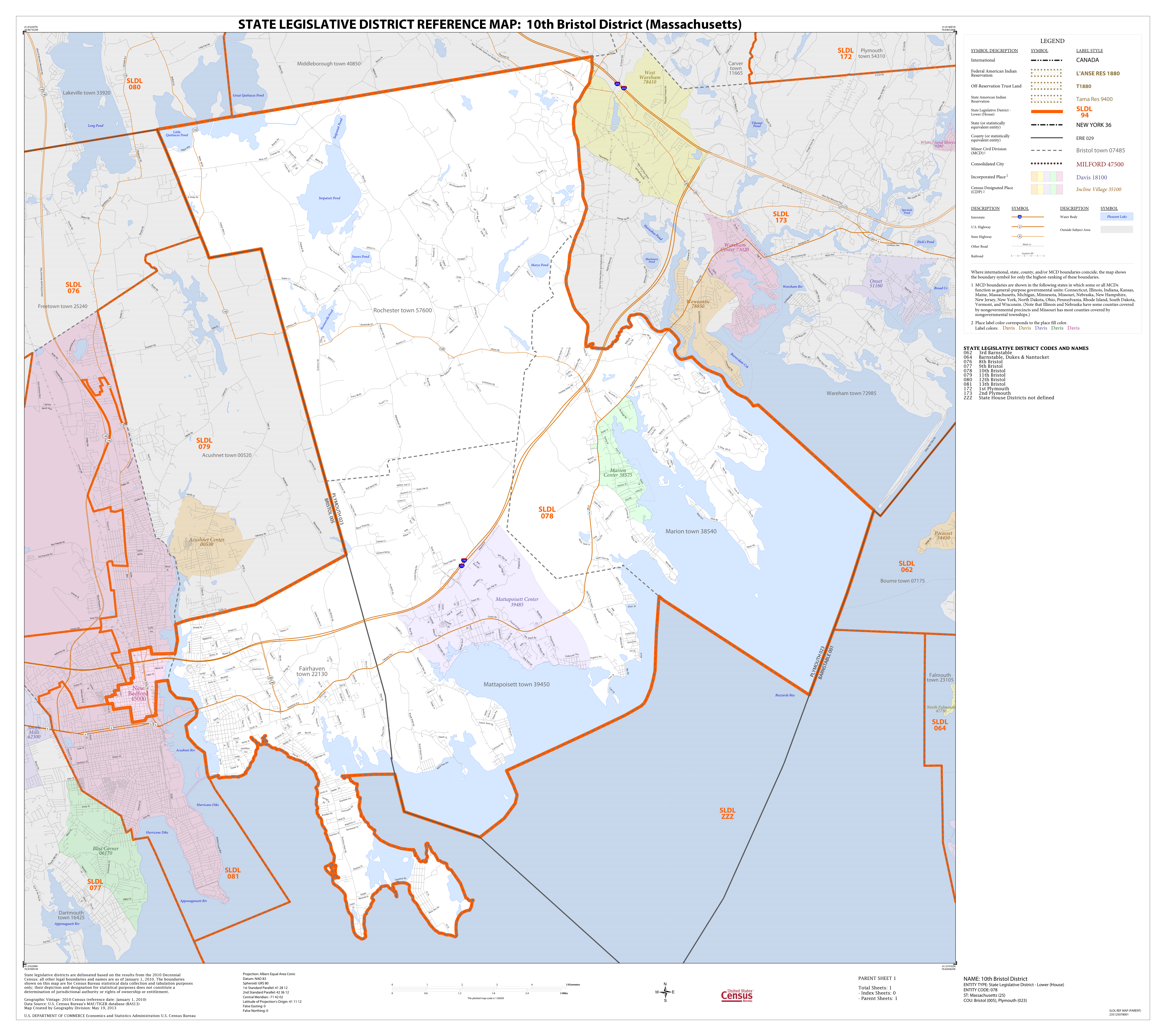
Map of Massachusetts House of Representatives' 10th Bristol district, based on the 2010 United States census.

Massachusetts House of Representatives' 10th Bristol district in the United States is one of 160 legislative districts included in the lower house of the Massachusetts General Court. It covers parts of Bristol County and Plymouth County. Democrat Mark Sylvia has represented the district since 2025.

== Towns represented ==
The district includes the following localities:

- Fairhaven
- Marion
- Mattapoisett
- part of New Bedford
- Rochester

The current district geographic boundary overlaps with those of the Massachusetts Senate's 1st Bristol and Plymouth, 2nd Bristol and Plymouth, and 1st Plymouth and Bristol districts.

=== Former locale ===
The district previously covered part of Fall River, circa 1927.

== Representatives ==
- Wm. H. Allen, circa 1858
- Hattil Kelley, circa 1858
- Alanson Borden, circa 1859
- Saben P. Chamberlain, circa 1859
- Edmund A. Davis, circa 1888
- William S. Conroy, circa 1920
- Edward F. Harrington, circa 1920
- William Thomas O'Brien, circa 1951
- Frank B. Oliveira, circa 1951
- Antone S. Aguiar Jr.
- Maniel Raposa, Jr., circa 1975
- Roger Tougas, circa 1984
- John C. Bradford, 1985–1993
- William M. Straus, 1993-2025
- Mark Sylvia, 2025-Present

== See also ==
- List of Massachusetts House of Representatives elections
- Other Bristol County districts of the Massachusetts House of Representatives: 1st, 2nd, 3rd, 4th, 5th, 6th, 7th, 8th, 9th, 11th, 12th, 13th, 14th
- List of Massachusetts General Courts
- List of former districts of the Massachusetts House of Representatives

== Images ==
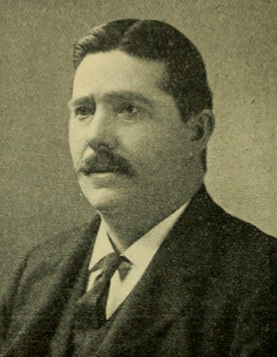
Francis Fennelly

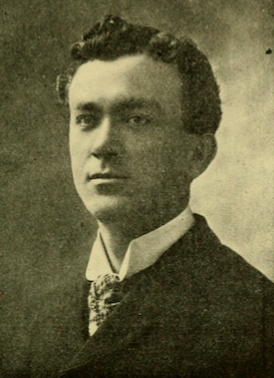
Joseph Parks

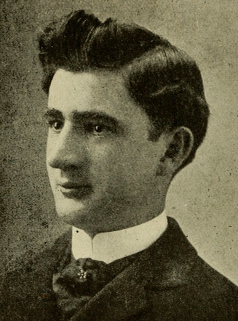
Edward Harrington

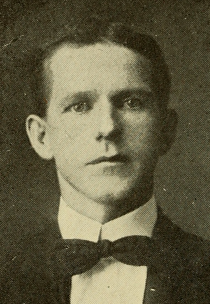
William Conroy

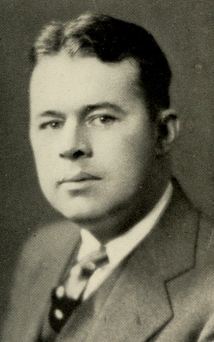
George Driscoll

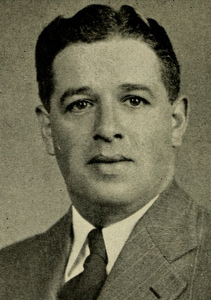
Frank Oliveira

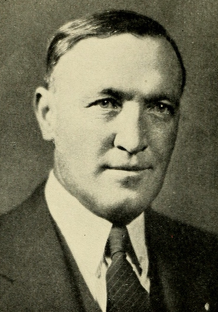
William O'Brien

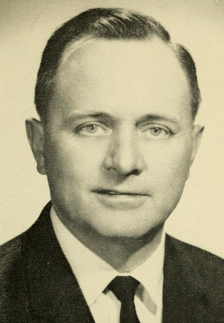
Bernard Paquette

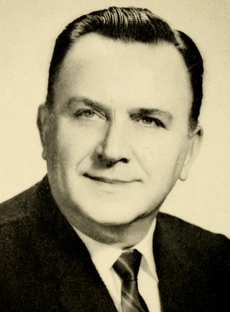
Matthew Kuss

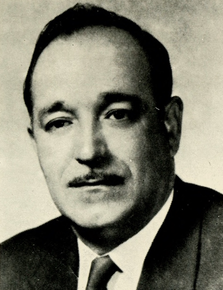
Manuel Raposa

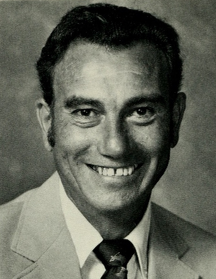
Walter Silveira

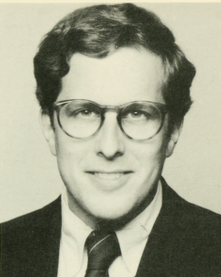
William Straus
