= Michael Rodrigues (politician) =

American politician

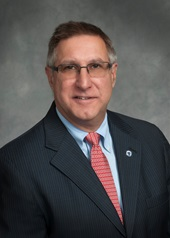

Member of the Massachusetts Senate from the 1st Bristol and Plymouth district
- Incumbent
- Assumed office January 5, 2011
- Preceded by: Joan Menard

Member of the Massachusetts House of Representatives from the 8th Bristol district
- In office January 4, 1996 – January 5, 2011
- Preceded by: Edward M. Lambert, Jr.
- Succeeded by: Paul Schmid

Personal details
- Born: May 30, 1959 (age 67) Fall River, Massachusetts
- Party: Democratic
- Spouse: Patricia
- Children: 2
- Education: Southeastern Massachusetts University, B.S. Accounting (1983)

Michael J. Rodrigues (born May 30, 1959) is a Democratic politician from Southeast Massachusetts who has served in the Massachusetts Legislature since 1996. He is currently a member of the Massachusetts Senate representing the 1st Bristol and Plymouth district. He serves as Chair of the Senate Ways and Means Committee.

== Early life and education ==
Rodrigues was born on born May 30, 1959 in Fall River. He is a third-generation Luso-American and has been a resident of neighboring Westport for decades. He attended the University of Massachusetts Dartmouth, where he received a degree in accounting.

== Political career ==
Prior to serving in the Massachusetts legislature, he was a member of the Westport Democratic Town Committee and chairman of the Westport Finance Committee.

From 1996 to 2011, he was a member of the Massachusetts House of Representatives, where he represented the 8th Bristol district.

He ran for the Senate in 2010, winning a three-way Democratic primary race. He has not been challenged in the primary since then and has often been unopposed in the general election.

== Personal life ==
He has been President and Treasurer of ABC Floor Covering, Westport, Massachusetts since 1982.

== See also ==
- 2019–2020 Massachusetts legislature
- 2021–2022 Massachusetts legislature
- 2023–2024 Massachusetts legislature
- 2025–2026 Massachusetts legislature
