= Massachusetts House of Representatives' 12th Bristol district =

American legislative district

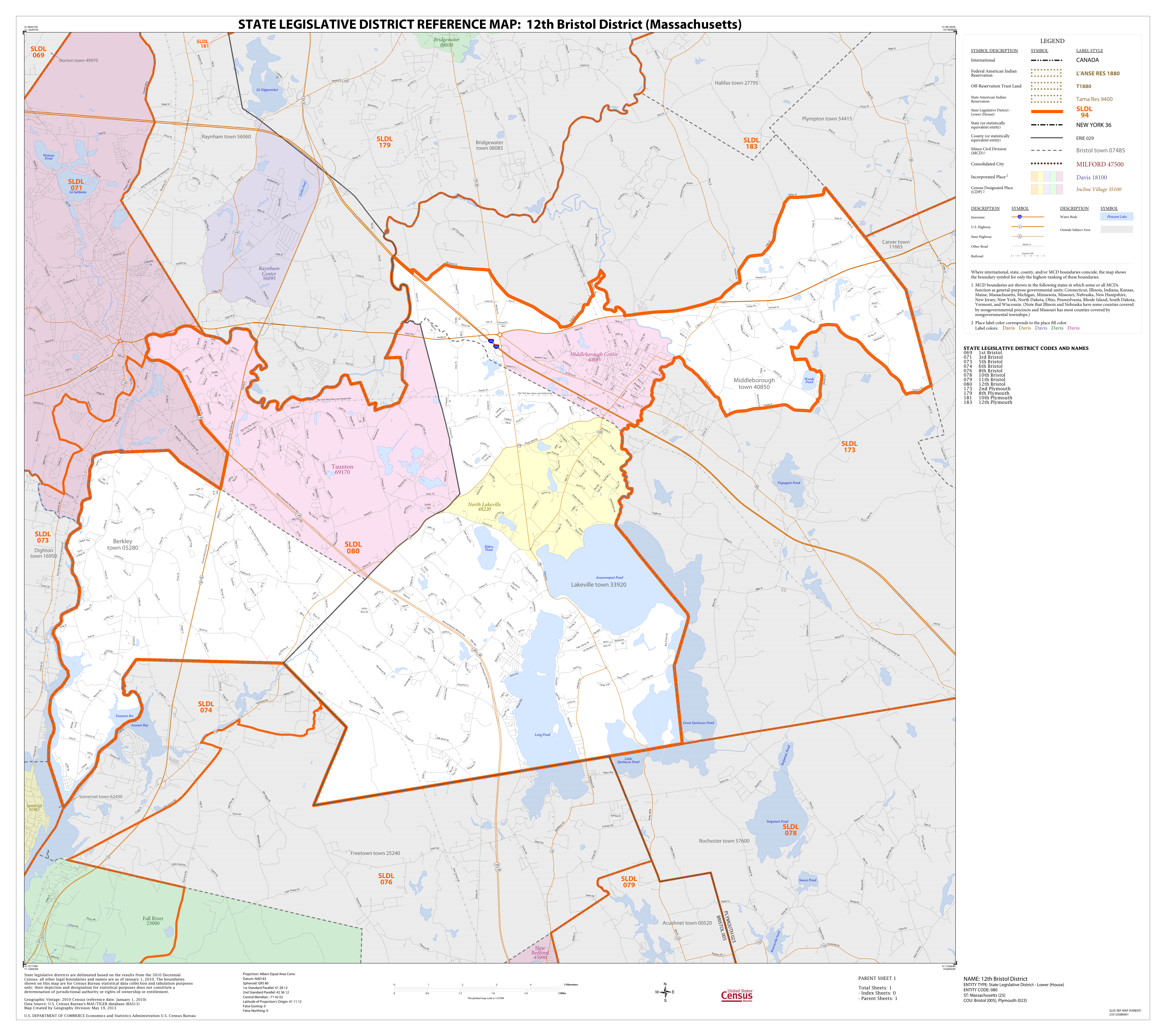
Map of Massachusetts House of Representatives' 12th Bristol district, based on the 2010 United States census.

Massachusetts House of Representatives' 12th Bristol district in the United States is one of 160 legislative districts included in the lower house of the Massachusetts General Court. It covers parts of Bristol County and Plymouth County. Republican Norman Orrall of Lakeville has represented the district since 2019.

== Towns represented ==
The district includes the following localities:

- Berkley
- Lakeville
- Middleborough
- part of Taunton

The current district geographic boundary overlaps with those of the Massachusetts Senate's 1st Bristol and Plymouth and 1st Plymouth and Bristol districts.

=== Former locales ===
The district previously covered:

- Acushnet, circa 1872
- Fairhaven, circa 1872
- part of Fall River, circa 1927
- Westport, circa 1927

== Representatives ==
- Thomas G. Nichols, circa 1858
- William S. Crane, circa 1859
- Martin L. Eldridge, circa 1858-1859
- Thomas Edward Kitchen, circa 1951
- Matthew J. Kuss, circa 1975
- Stephen Canessa, circa 2011
- Keiko Orrall, September 22, 2011 – January 5, 2019
- Norman J. Orrall, 2019-current

== See also ==
- List of Massachusetts House of Representatives elections
- Other Bristol County districts of the Massachusetts House of Representatives: 1st, 2nd, 3rd, 4th, 5th, 6th, 7th, 8th, 9th, 10th, 11th, 13th, 14th
- List of Massachusetts General Courts
- List of former districts of the Massachusetts House of Representatives

== Images ==
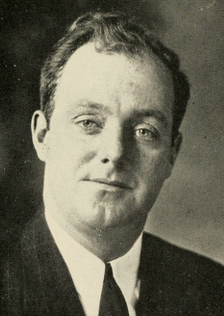
James Hathaway

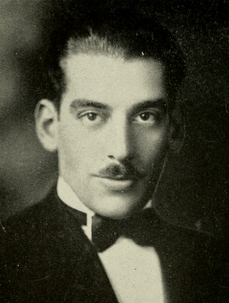
Joseph Theberge

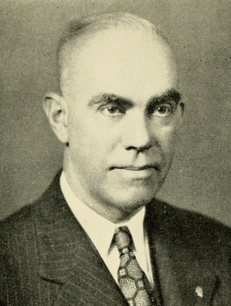
Clifton Dwelly

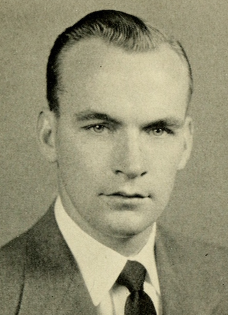
Thomas Edward Kitchen

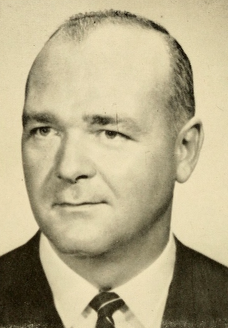
Wilfred Driscoll

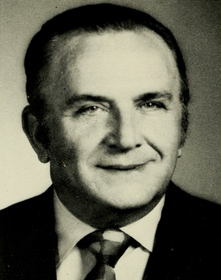
Matthew Kuss

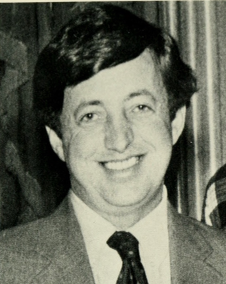
David Nelson

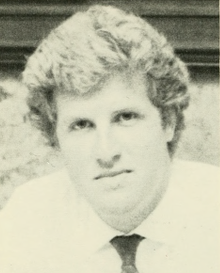
Joseph McIntyre

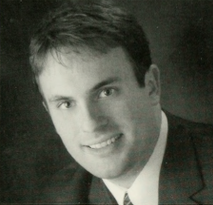
Stephen Canessa
