= Antonio Cabral =

American politician

Tony Cabral
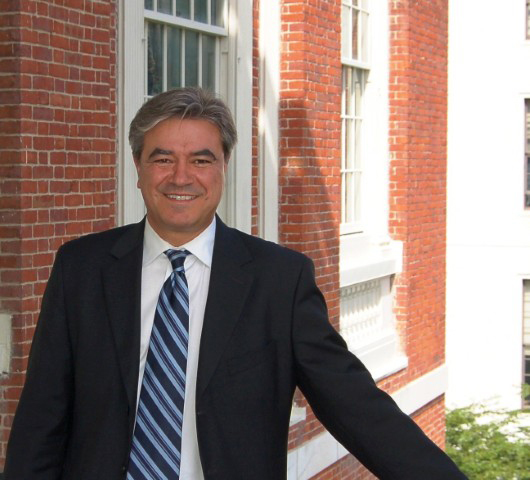

Member of the Massachusetts House of Representatives from the 13th Bristol district
- Incumbent
- Assumed office January 2, 1991
- Preceded by: Denis Lawrence

Personal details
- Born: January 26, 1955 (age 71) Pico Island
- Party: Democratic
- Education: Bristol Community College; Southeastern Massachusetts University
- Occupation: Teacher; Politician

Antonio F. D. "Tony" Cabral is the current member of the Massachusetts House of Representatives for the 13th Bristol district. He is of Portuguese descent.

== Early life ==
In 1969, when Cabral was 14 years old, he and his family emigrated from Pico Island in the Azores to Bristol, Rhode Island. When he first came to the United States, no one in his family spoke English.

He attended school during the day, and worked at night to help support his family. Cabral graduated from Bristol Community College and Southeastern Massachusetts University (now UMass Dartmouth) and began a career as a public school teacher. Cabral taught languages and social studies in Taunton, Massachusetts, Plymouth, Massachusetts, and Carver, Massachusetts before entering politics.

== Massachusetts House of Representatives ==
Cabral was elected to the Massachusetts House of Representatives in 1990. He is the current chairman of the House Committee on Bonding, Capital Expenditures, and State Assets and also serves on the Special Joint Committee on Redistricting.

As a State Representative, Cabral worked to extend historic tax credits, pass anti-bullying legislation, secure education funds for New Bedford, and strengthen registration requirements for sex offenders.

He is also a supporter of New Bedford's fishermen and South Coast Rail.

He has also supported a proposal that would allow for hearings to be held in cases involving certain types of gun crime.

== 2011 mayoral campaign ==
On June 6, 2011, Cabral announced that he was running for Mayor of New Bedford. He ran against City Councilor Linda M. Morad and Assistant United States Attorney Jon Mitchell. Incumbent Mayor Scott W. Lang did not run for re-election.

On November 8, 2011, Cabral was defeated in the mayoral race by Mitchell 52%-48%, taking a total of 9,039 votes to Jon Mitchell's 9,878 votes.

== Honours ==
Cabral has received the Collar of the Order of Timor-Leste in 2017.

== See also ==
- 2019–2020 Massachusetts legislature
- 2021–2022 Massachusetts legislature
