= Massachusetts House of Representatives' 4th Bristol district =

American legislative district

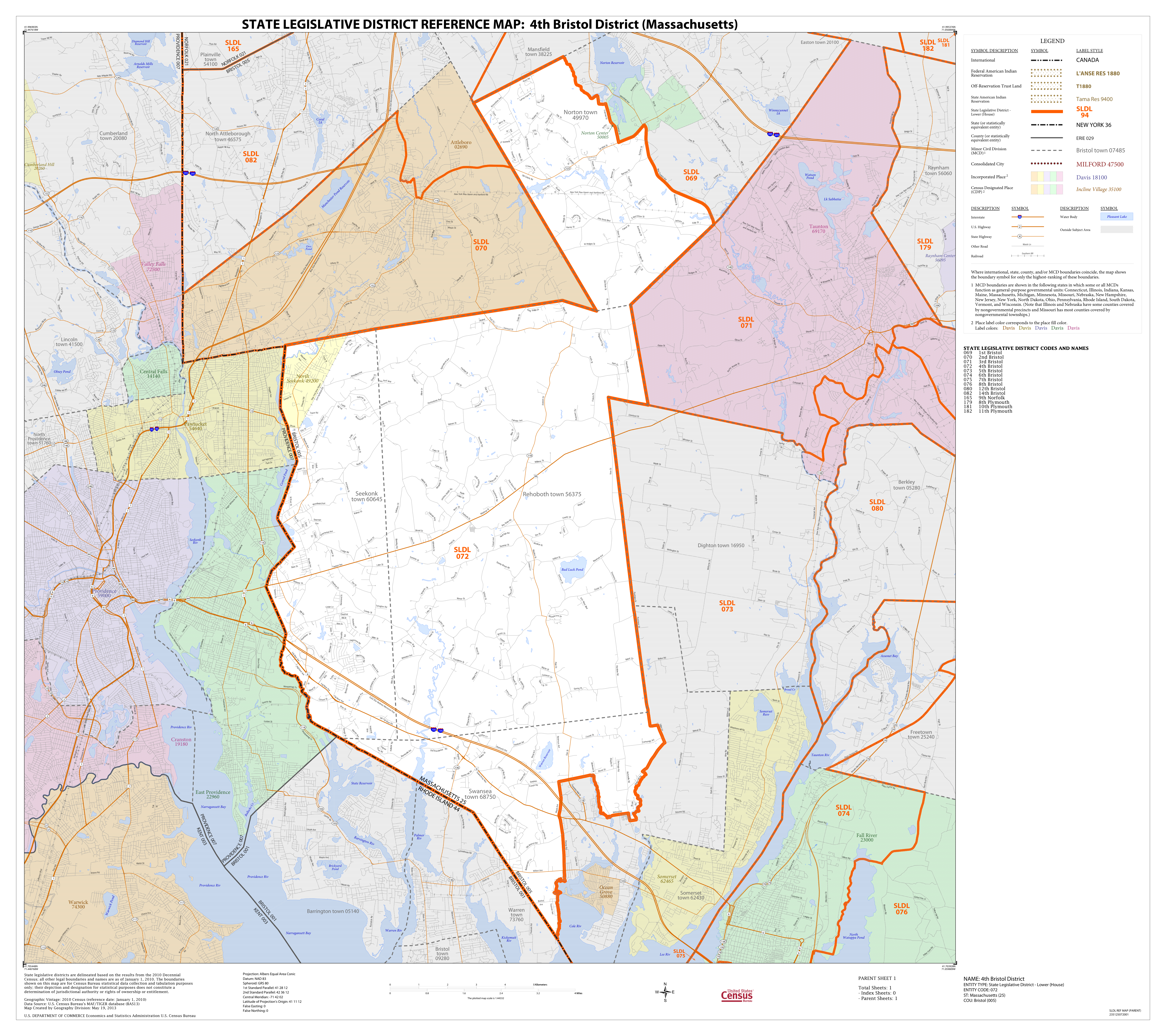
Map of Massachusetts House of Representatives' 4th Bristol district, based on the 2010 United States census.

Massachusetts House of Representatives' 4th Bristol district in the United States is one of 160 legislative districts included in the lower house of the Massachusetts General Court. It covers part of Bristol County. Republican Steven Howitt of Seekonk has represented the district since 2011.

== Towns represented ==
The district includes the following localities:

- part of Norton
- Rehoboth
- Seekonk
- part of Swansea

The current district geographic boundary overlaps with those of the Massachusetts Senate's 1st Bristol and Plymouth and Bristol and Norfolk districts.

=== Former locales ===
The district previously covered Taunton, circa 1872.

== Representatives ==
- Charles Foster, circa 1858
- Marcus Morton, circa 1858
- Harrison Tweed, circa 1858
- Elisha Copeland, circa 1859
- Henry H. Fox, circa 1859
- Henry Sproat, circa 1859
- Arthur G. Rounseville, circa 1888
- Joseph E. Warner, circa 1920
- Peter B. Gay, circa 1951
- Ronald Anthony Pina, circa 1975
- Antone S. Aguiar Jr., 1979–1982
- Philip Travis, 1983–2007
- Steven D'Amico, 2007–2011
- Steven S. Howitt, 2011-current

== See also ==
- List of Massachusetts House of Representatives elections
- Other Bristol County districts of the Massachusetts House of Representatives: 1st, 2nd, 3rd, 5th, 6th, 7th, 8th, 9th, 10th, 11th, 12th, 13th, 14th
- List of Massachusetts General Courts
- List of former districts of the Massachusetts House of Representatives

== Images ==
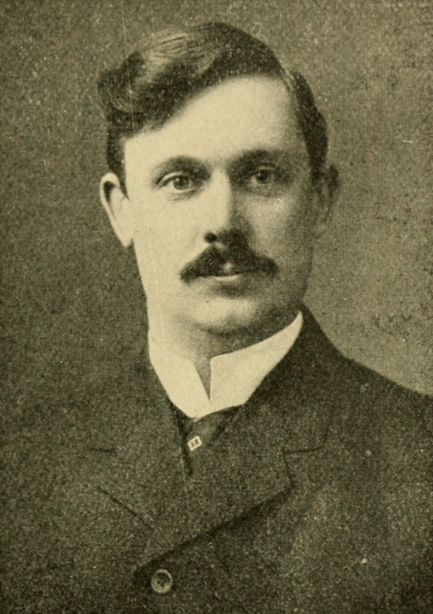
William Dean

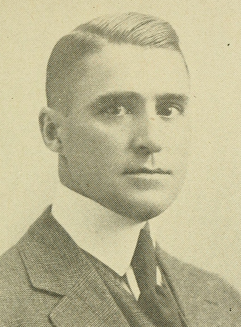
Joseph Warner

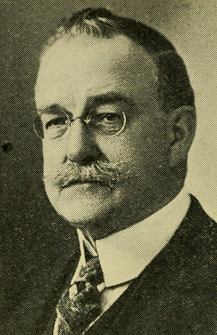
Thomas Morton

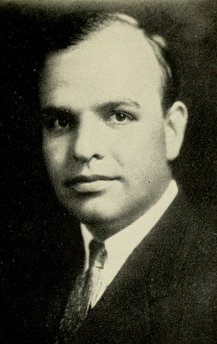
Walter Baylies

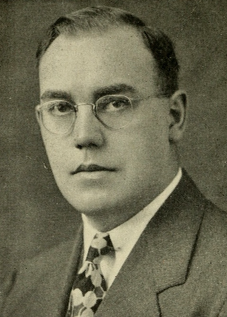
Talbot Tweedy

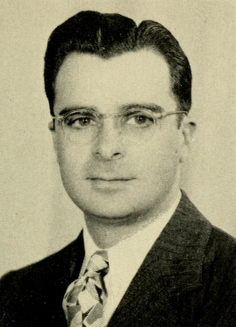
Peter Gay

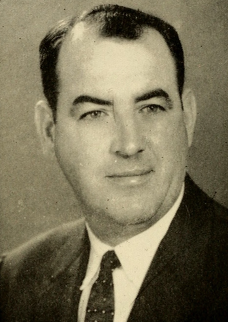
Charles Flannery

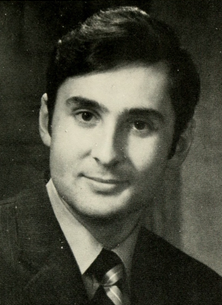
Ronald Pina

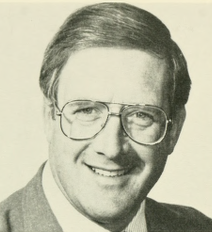
Philip Travis
