= Massachusetts House of Representatives' 5th Bristol district =

American legislative district

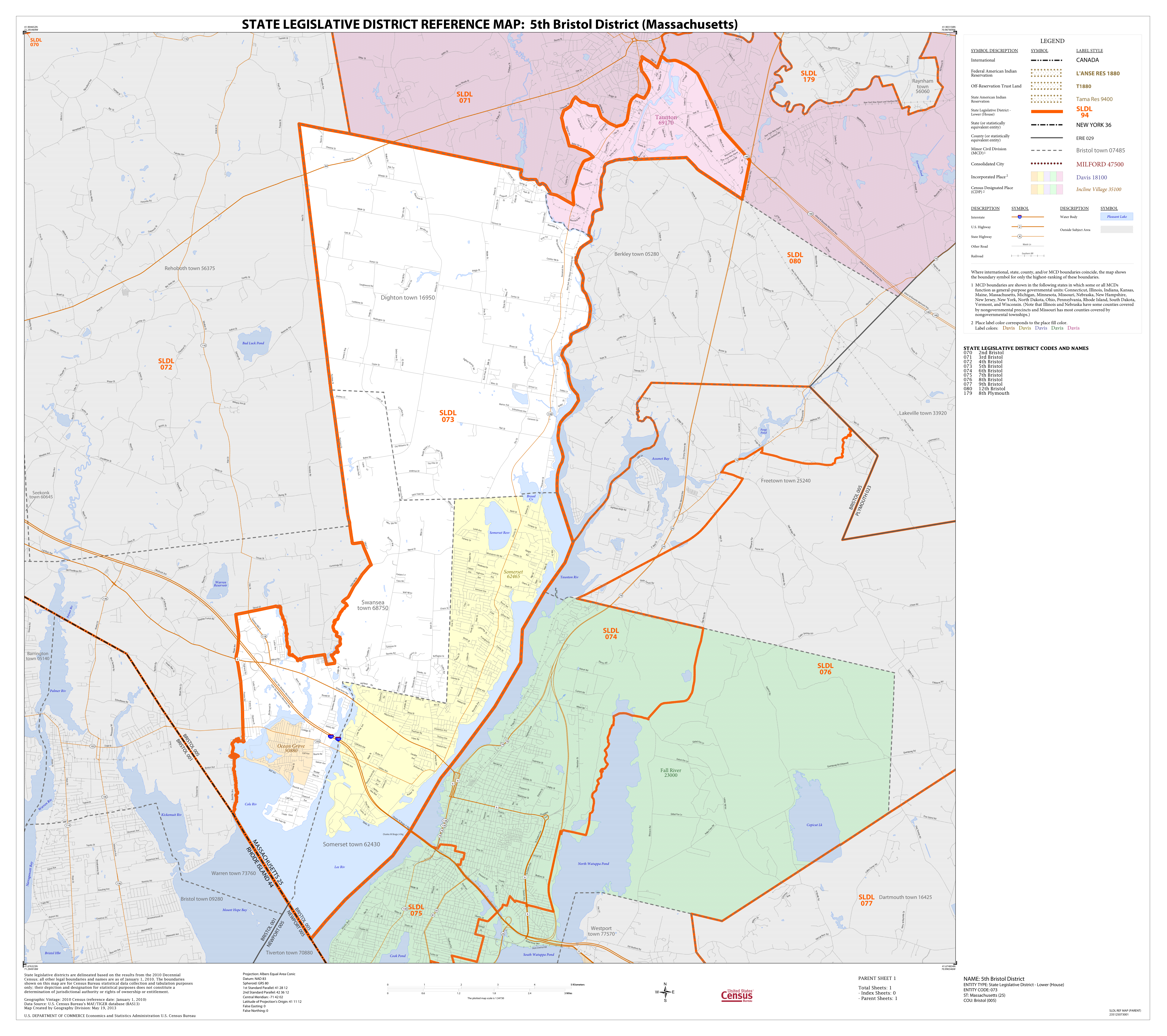
Map of Massachusetts House of Representatives' 5th Bristol district, based on the 2010 United States census.

Massachusetts House of Representatives' 5th Bristol district in the United States is one of 160 legislative districts included in the lower house of the Massachusetts General Court. It covers part of Bristol County. Republican Justin Thurber of Somerset has represented the district since 2025.

== Towns represented ==
The district includes the following localities:

- Dighton
- Somerset
- part of Swansea
- part of Taunton

The current district geographic boundary overlaps with those of the Massachusetts Senate's 1st Bristol and Plymouth and 1st Plymouth and Bristol districts.

=== Former locales ===
The district previously covered:

- Berkley, circa 1872, 1927
- Freetown, circa 1927
- Rehoboth, circa 1872, 1927
- Seekonk, circa 1872, 1927

== Representatives ==
- Joel Marble, circa 1858
- John C. Marvel, circa 1859
- Isaac B. Tompkins, circa 1888
- Rufus H. Willis, circa 1888
- Albert C. Goff, circa 1920
- Stephen L. French, circa 1951
- Raymond S. Peck, circa 1975
- Manuel Raposa, circa 1978
- Joan Menard, 1979–2000
- Patricia A. Haddad, 2001-2025
- Justin Thurber, 2025-Current

== See also ==
- List of Massachusetts House of Representatives elections
- Other Bristol County districts of the Massachusetts House of Representatives: 1st, 2nd, 3rd, 4th, 6th, 7th, 8th, 9th, 10th, 11th, 12th, 13th, 14th
- List of Massachusetts General Courts
- List of former districts of the Massachusetts House of Representatives

== Images ==
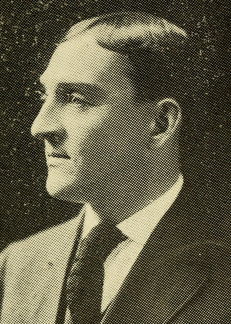
Benjamin Jones

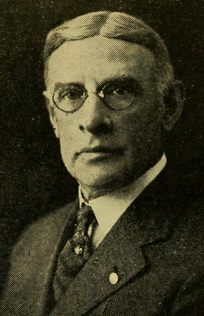
Frank Guillo

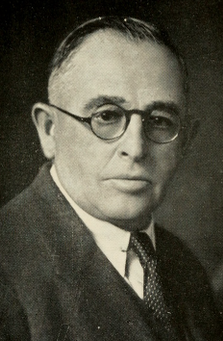
Frank Horton

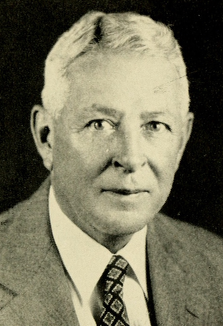
Stephen French

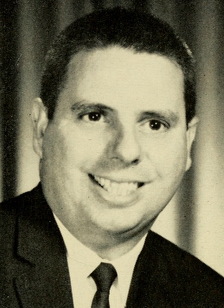
Antone Aguiar

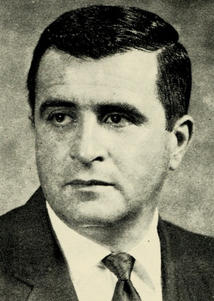
Raymond Peck

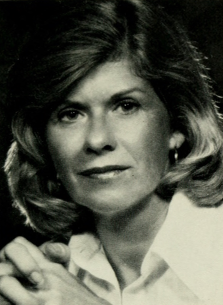
Joan Menard

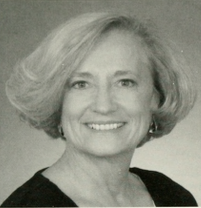
Patricia Haddad
