= Massachusetts House of Representatives' 8th Bristol district =

American legislative district

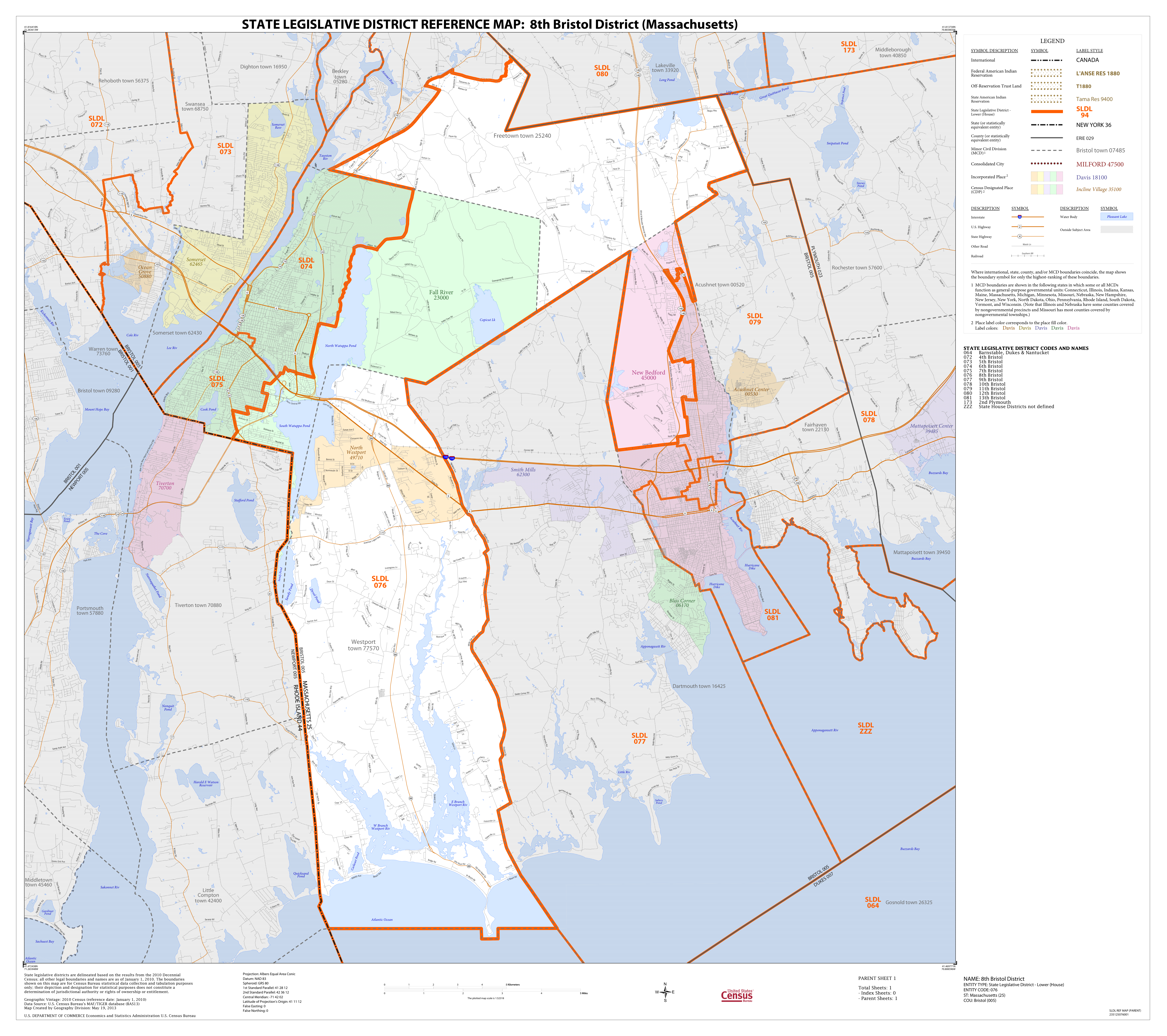
Map of Massachusetts House of Representatives' 8th Bristol district, based on the 2010 United States census.

Massachusetts House of Representatives' 8th Bristol district in the United States is one of 160 legislative districts included in the lower house of the Massachusetts General Court. It covers part of Bristol County. Democrat Steven J. Ouellette has represented the district since 2025.

== Locales represented ==
The district includes the following localities:

- part of Fall River
- part of Freetown
- part of New Bedford
- Westport

The current district geographic boundary overlaps with those of the Massachusetts Senate's 1st Bristol and Plymouth and 2nd Bristol and Plymouth districts.

=== Former locale ===
The district previously covered Dartmouth, circa 1927.

== Representatives ==
- Ezra P. Brownell, circa 1858-1859
- William Alexander Carman, circa 1888
- James Conroy, circa 1888
- Andrew Quinn, circa 1888
- Joseph F. Mooney, 1894, 1895
- William J. Bullock, circa 1920
- Andrew P. Doyle, circa 1920
- Edgar F. Howland, circa 1920
- Joseph Douglas Saulnier, circa 1951
- John J. Long, circa 1975
- Charles E. Silvia
- Edward M. Lambert Jr.
- Michael Rodrigues
- Paul Schmid, III, 2011-2025
- Steven J. Ouellette, 2025-Present

== See also ==
- List of Massachusetts House of Representatives elections
- Other Bristol County districts of the Massachusetts House of Representatives: 1st, 2nd, 3rd, 4th, 5th, 6th, 7th, 9th, 10th, 11th, 12th, 13th, 14th
- List of Massachusetts General Courts
- List of former districts of the Massachusetts House of Representatives

== Images ==
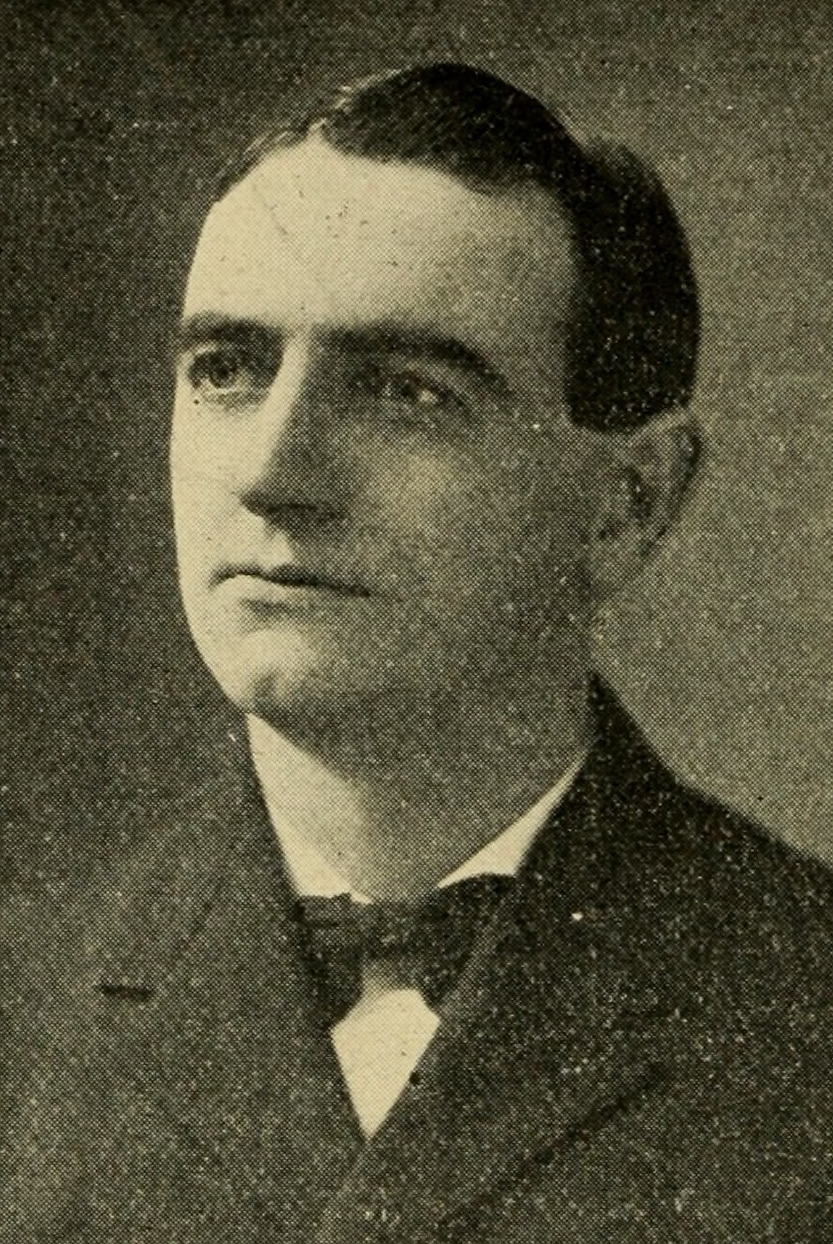
Andrew Doyle

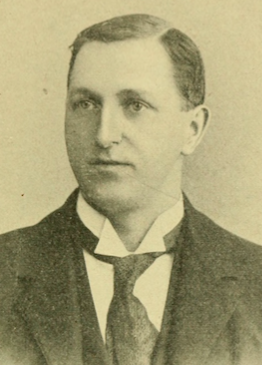
Sidney Lees

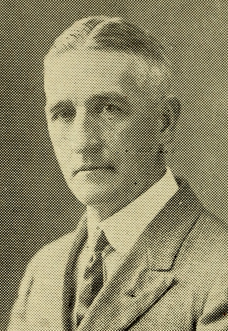
Edgar Howland

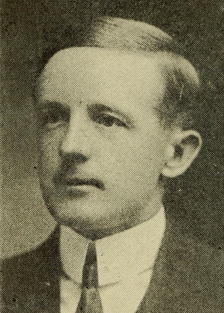
Gilbert Southworth

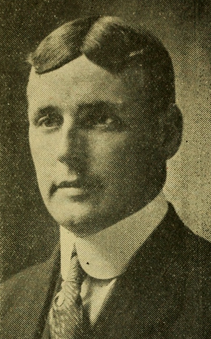
Frederick Dexter Sowle

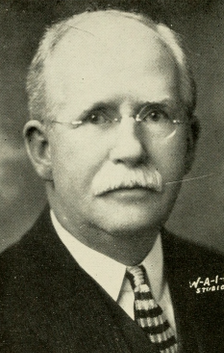
John Halliwell

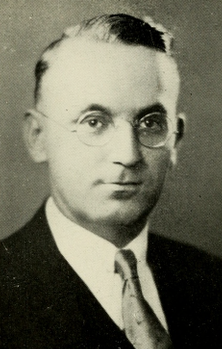
Leo Carney

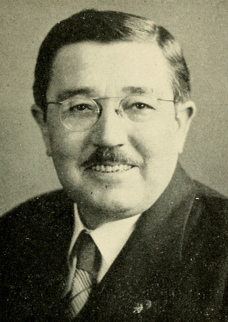
Jacinto Diniz

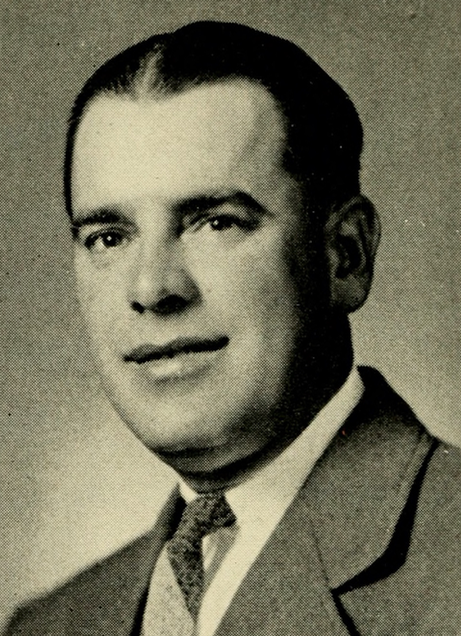
Joseph Douglas Saulnier

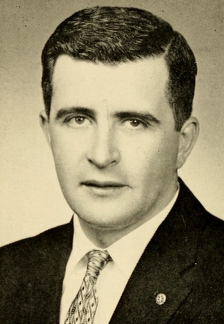
Raymond Peck

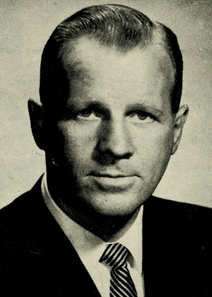
John Long

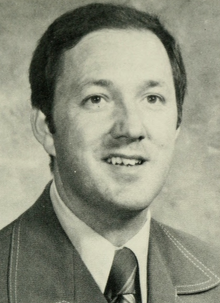
Charles Silvia

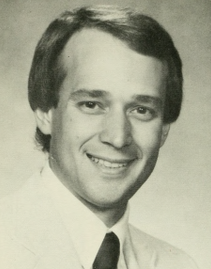
Edward Lambert

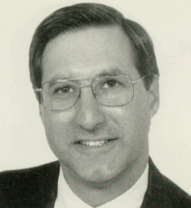
Michael Rodrigues
