= Massachusetts House of Representatives' 6th Bristol district =

American legislative district

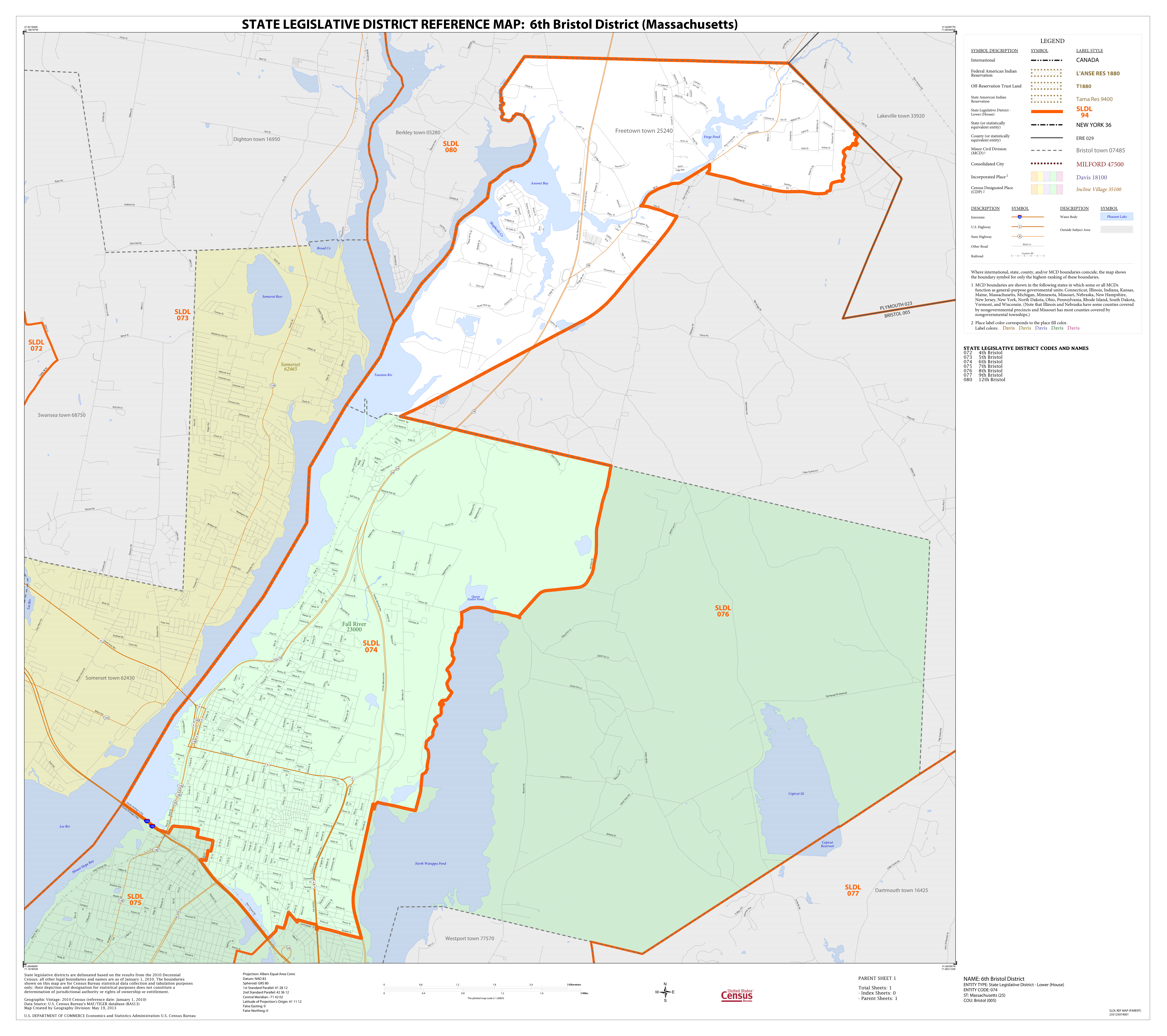
Map of Massachusetts House of Representatives' 6th Bristol district, based on the 2010 United States census.

Massachusetts House of Representatives' 6th Bristol district in the United States is one of 160 legislative districts included in the lower house of the Massachusetts General Court. It covers part of Bristol County. Democrat Carole Fiola of Fall River has represented the district since 2013.

== Locales represented ==
The district includes the following localities:

- part of Fall River
- part of Freetown

The current district geographic boundary overlaps with that of the Massachusetts Senate's 1st Bristol and Plymouth district.

=== Former locales ===
The district previously covered:

- Acushnet, circa 1927
- part of New Bedford, circa 1927
- Somerset, circa 1872
- Swansea, circa 1872

== Representatives ==
- Jervis Shove, circa 1858
- William Lawton Slade, circa 1859
- William Gordon Jr., circa 1888
- Charles P. Rugg, circa 1888
- Herbert Wing, circa 1920
- G. Leo Bessette, circa 1951
- Theophile Jean Desroches, circa 1951
- William Q. Maclean, Jr., circa 1975
- Thomas C. Norton
- Albert Herren
- David B. Sullivan
- Carole A. Fiola, 2013-current

== See also ==
- List of Massachusetts House of Representatives elections
- Other Bristol County districts of the Massachusetts House of Representatives: 1st, 2nd, 3rd, 4th, 5th, 7th, 8th, 9th, 10th, 11th, 12th, 13th, 14th
- List of Massachusetts General Courts
- List of former districts of the Massachusetts House of Representatives

== Images ==
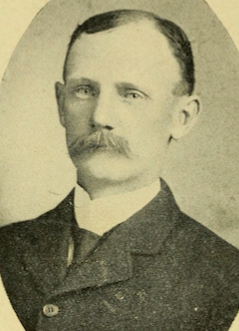
Herbert Wing

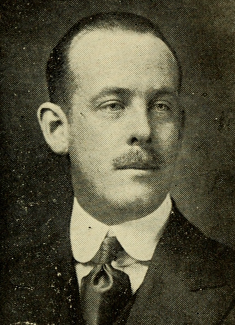
David Kelley

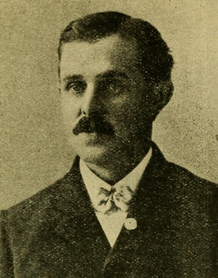
Walter Franklyn Douglas

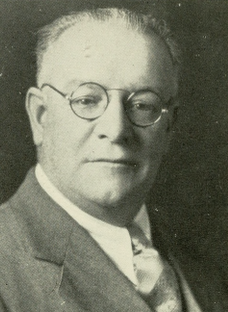
Alfred Bessette

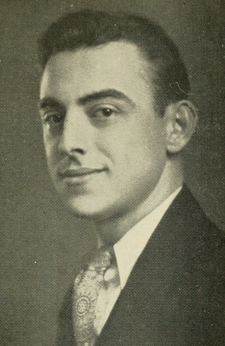
Rodolphe Bessette

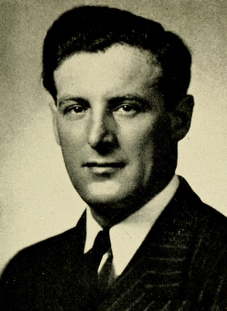
G. Leo Bessette

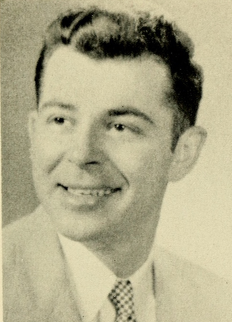
Leo James Normandin

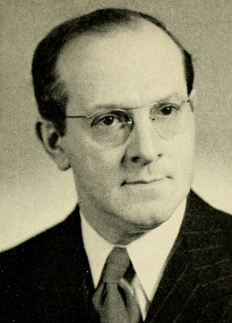
Theophile Jean Desroches

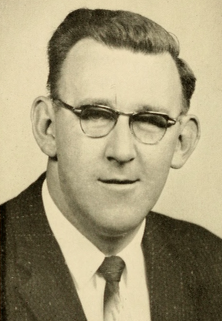
Donald Gaudette

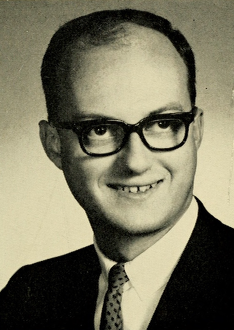
J. Louis Leblanc

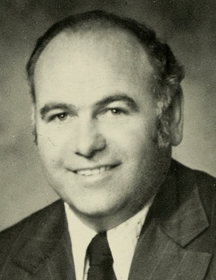
William MacLean

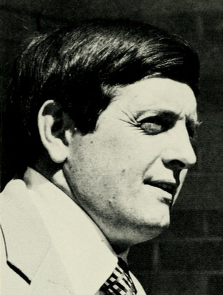
Thomas Norton

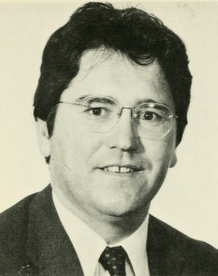
Albert Herren

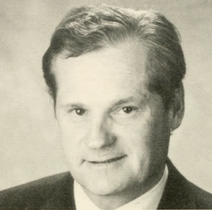
David Sullivan
