= Massachusetts House of Representatives' 7th Bristol district =

American legislative district

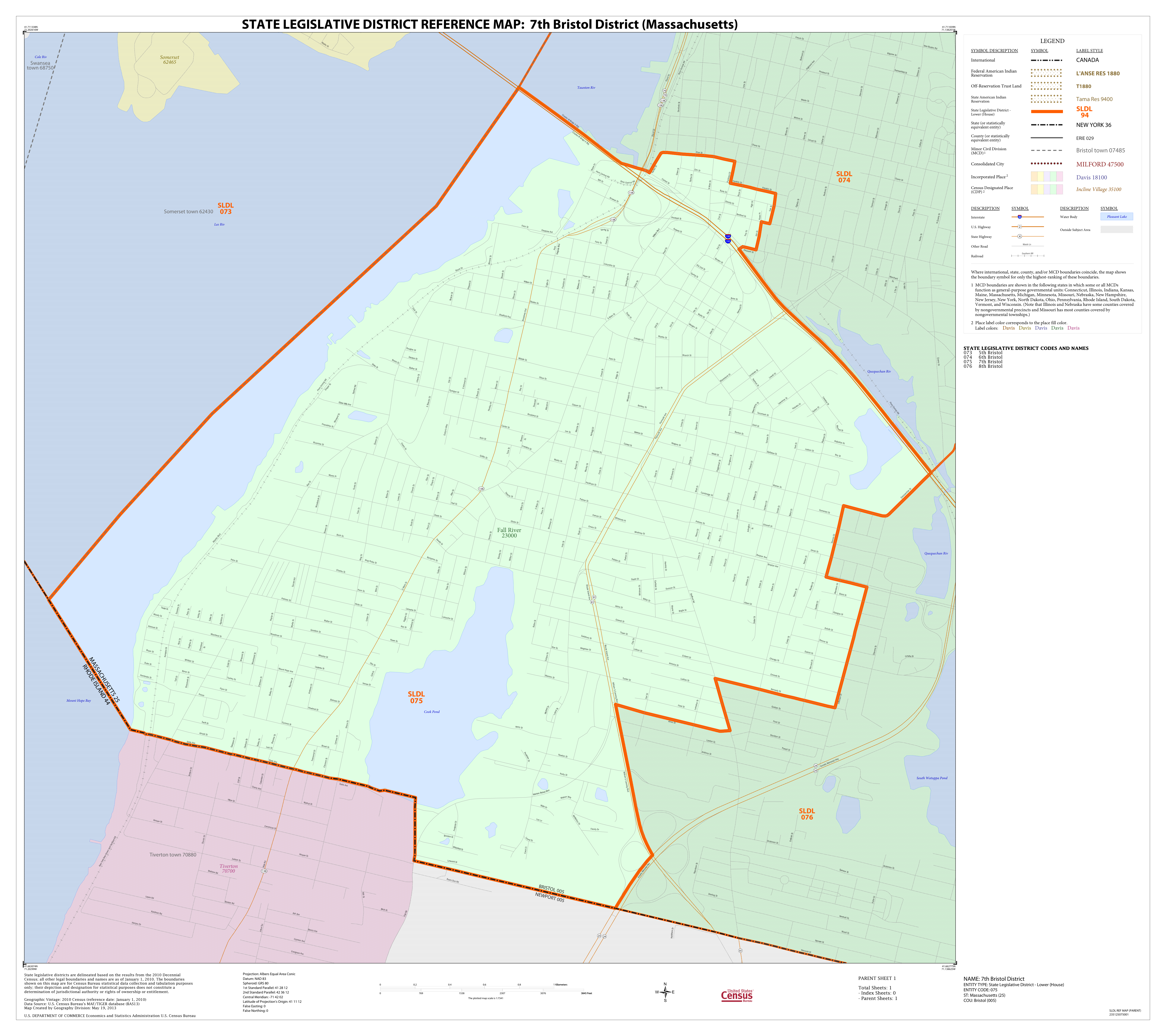
Map of Massachusetts House of Representatives' 7th Bristol district, based on the 2010 United States census.

Massachusetts House of Representatives' 7th Bristol district in the United States is one of 160 legislative districts included in the lower house of the Massachusetts General Court. It covers part of the city of Fall River in Bristol County. Democrat Alan Silvia of Fall River has represented the district since 2013.

The current district geographic boundary overlaps with that of the Massachusetts Senate's 1st Bristol and Plymouth district.

== Representatives ==
- Josiah C. Blaisdell, circa 1858
- Jona. E. Morrill, circa 1858
- Thomas T. Potter, circa 1859
- Stephen C. Wrightington, circa 1859
- George W. Slocum, circa 1888
- Alfred M. Bessette, circa 1920
- D. Herbert Cook, circa 1920
- Allison Rice Dorman, circa 1951
- Joseph A. Sylvia, Jr., circa 1951
- James Anthony O'Brien, Jr., circa 1975
- Henry S. Gillet, Jr. 1976
- Robert Correia
- Kevin Aguiar
- Alan Silvia, 2013-current

== Former locales ==
The district previously covered:

- Fairhaven, circa 1927
- part of New Bedford, circa 1927

== See also ==
- List of Massachusetts House of Representatives elections
- Other Bristol County districts of the Massachusetts House of Representatives: 1st, 2nd, 3rd, 4th, 5th, 6th, 8th, 9th, 10th, 11th, 12th, 13th, 14th
- List of Massachusetts General Courts
- List of former districts of the Massachusetts House of Representatives

== Images ==
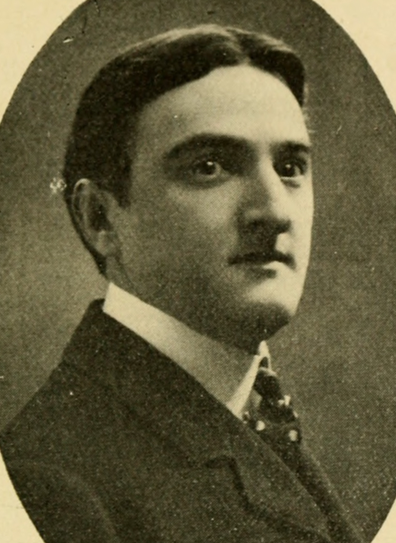
Joseph Desmond

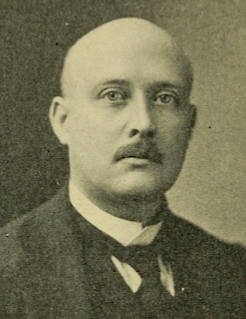
Samuel Ross

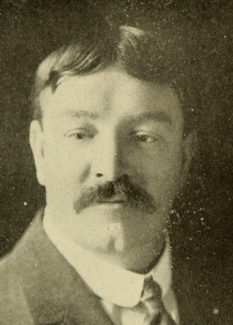
Alfred Bessette

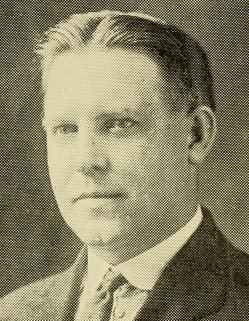
George Walker

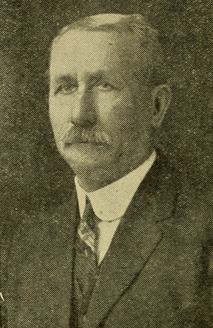
Herbert Cook

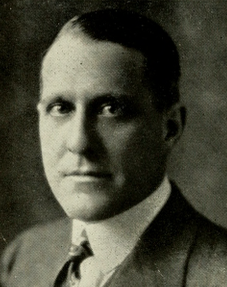
Chester Chase

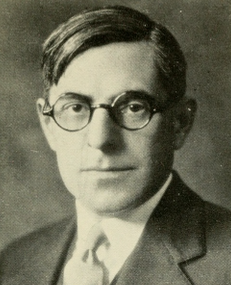
Philip Barnet

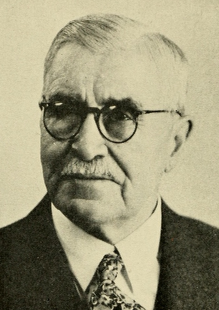
Samuel McLeod

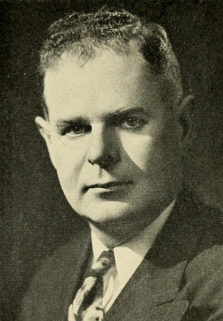
Timothy Moriarty

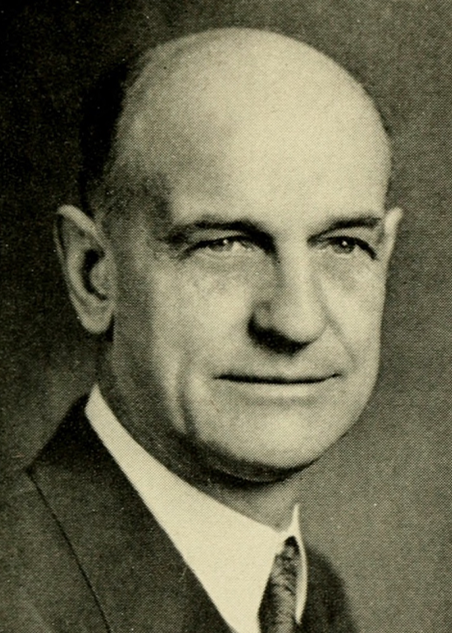
Allison Rice Dorman

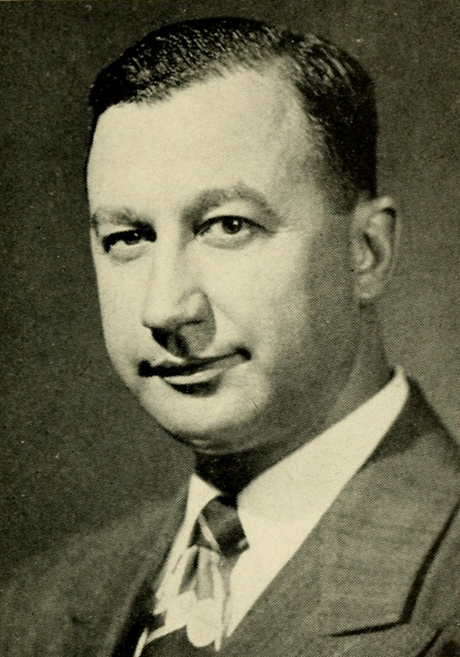
Joseph A. Sylvia Jr.

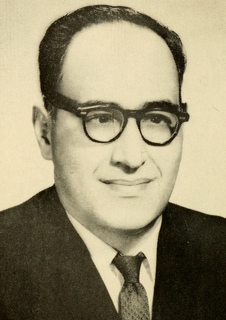
Edward Coury

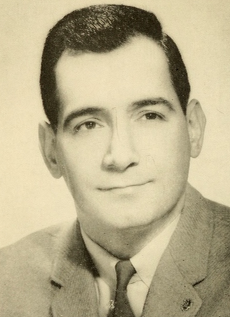
George Rogers

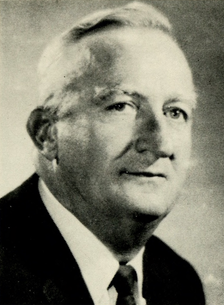
James O'Brien

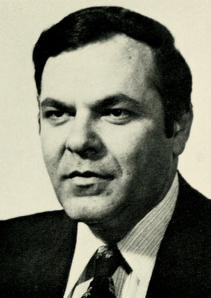
Robert Correia
