= Massachusetts House of Representatives' 9th Bristol district =

American legislative district

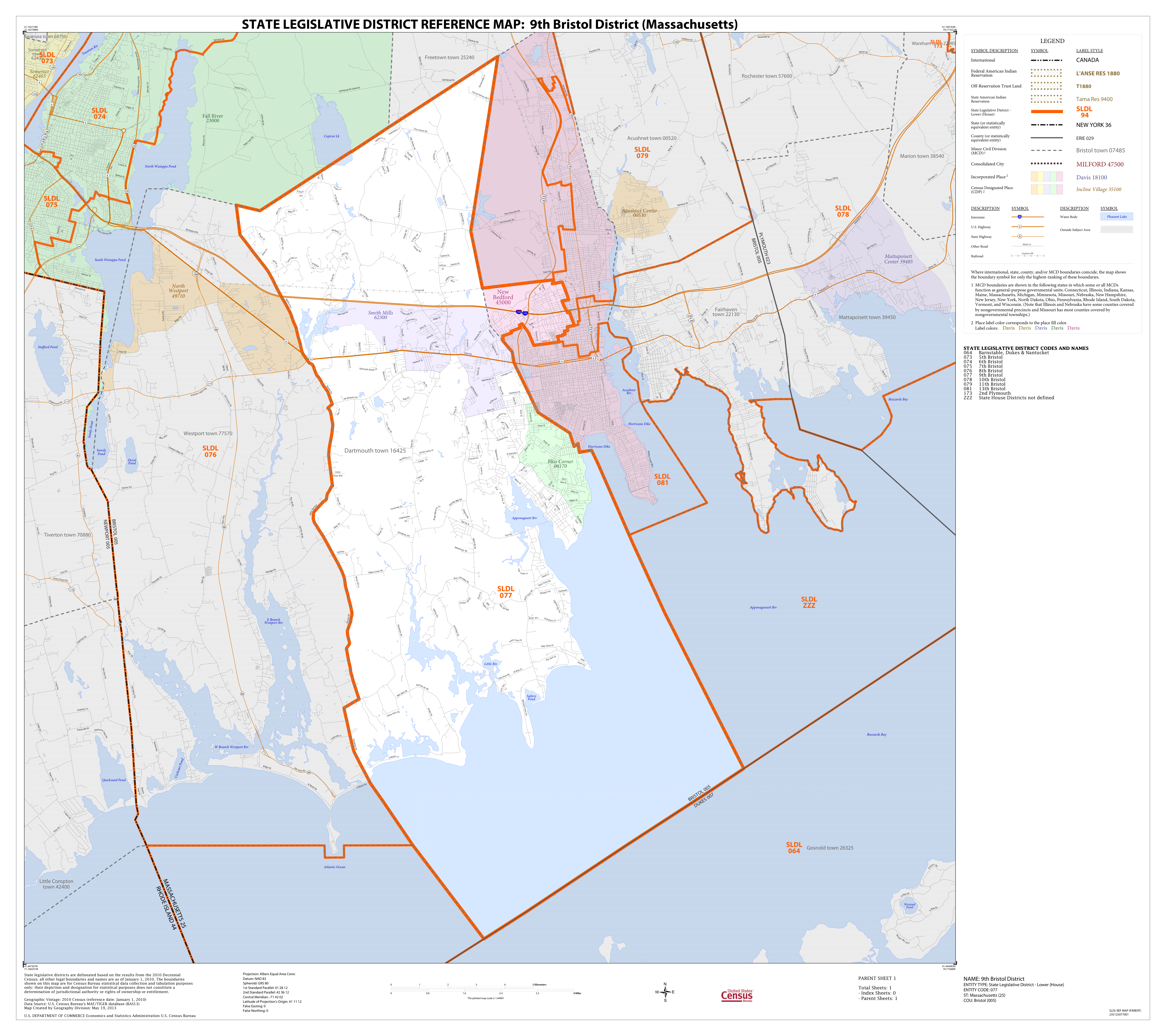
Map of Massachusetts House of Representatives' 9th Bristol district, based on the 2010 United States census.

Massachusetts House of Representatives' 9th Bristol district in the United States is one of 160 legislative districts included in the lower house of the Massachusetts General Court. It covers part of Bristol County. Democrat Christopher Markey of Dartmouth has represented the district since 2011.

== Locales represented ==
The district includes the following localities:

- Dartmouth
- In New Bedford: Ward 3, Precincts D, E, and F

The current district geographic boundary overlaps with that of the Massachusetts Senate's 2nd Bristol and Plymouth district.

=== Former locale ===
The district previously covered part of Fall River, circa 1927.

== Representatives ==
- Nathaniel Potter, Jr, circa 1858-1859
- Robert Henry, circa 1888
- John C. Milne, circa 1888
- Robert L. Manley, circa 1920
- Isaac U. Wood, circa 1920
- Frank Eben Brown, circa 1951
- Thomas C. Norton, circa 1975
- Leonard Gonsalves
- John F. Quinn
- Christopher M. Markey, 2011-current

== See also ==
- List of Massachusetts House of Representatives elections
- Other Bristol County districts of the Massachusetts House of Representatives: 1st, 2nd, 3rd, 4th, 5th, 6th, 7th, 8th, 10th, 11th, 12th, 13th, 14th
- List of Massachusetts General Courts
- List of former districts of the Massachusetts House of Representatives

== Images ==
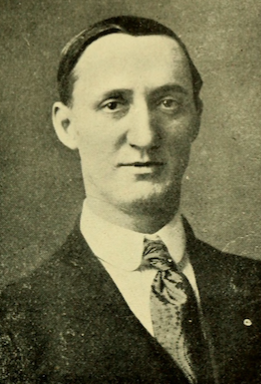
Fred Moore

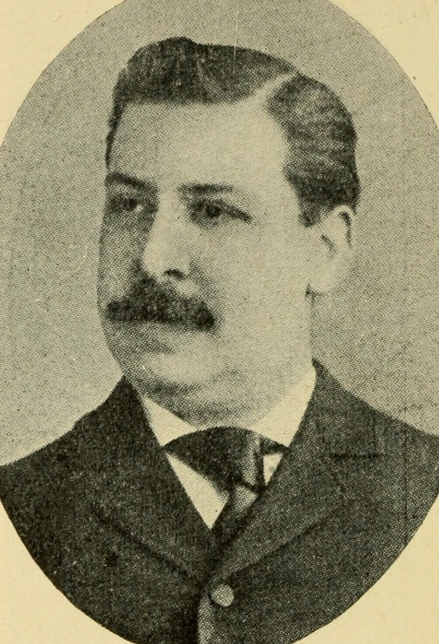
William Cook

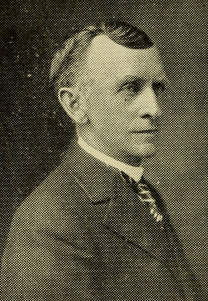
Isaac Wood

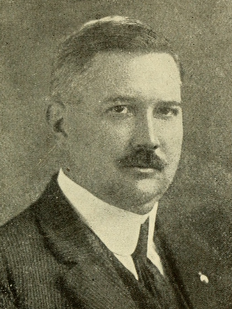
Joseph Freeling

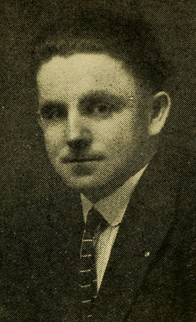
John Farrell

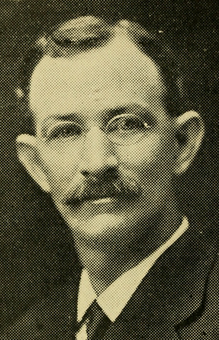
Robert Manley

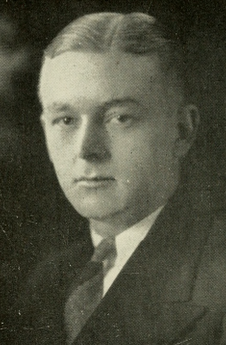
Frank O'Brien

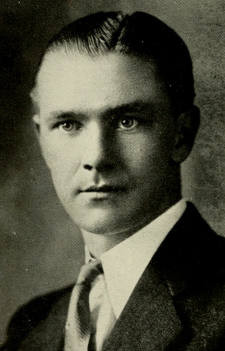
Terrance Lomax

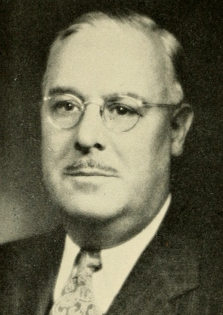
Frank Brown

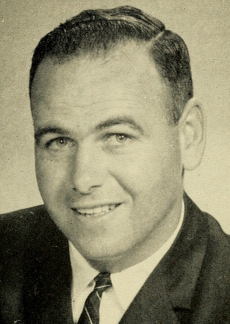
William MacLean

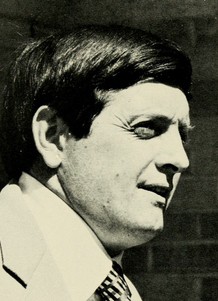
Thomas Norton

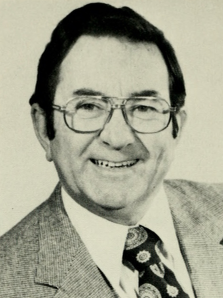
Roger Tougas

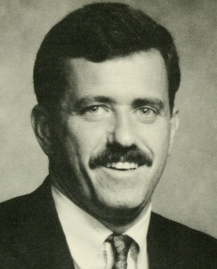
John Quinn
