= Massachusetts House of Representatives' 13th Bristol district =

American legislative district

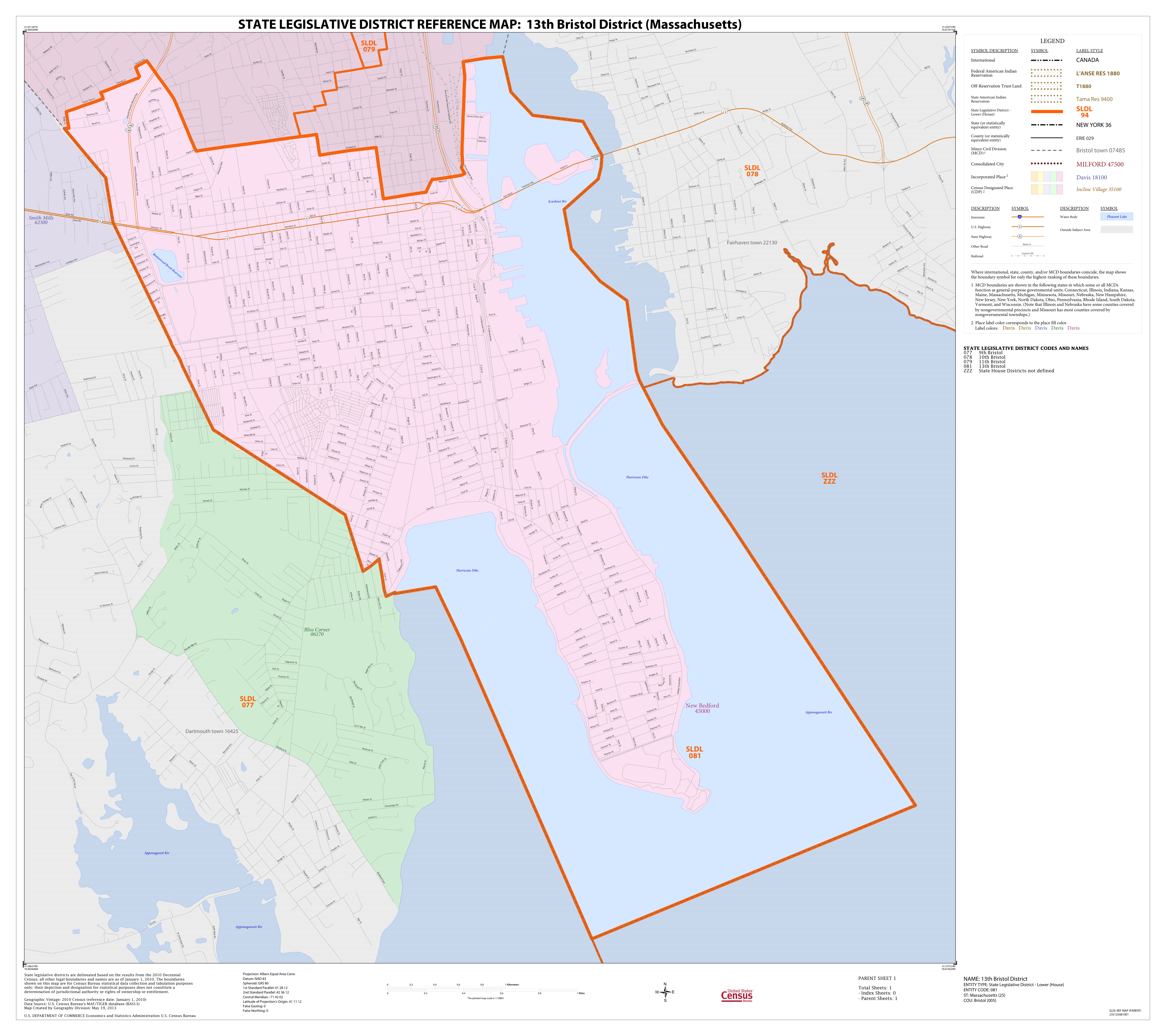
Map of Massachusetts House of Representatives' 13th Bristol district, based on the 2010 United States census.

Massachusetts House of Representatives' 13th Bristol district in the United States is one of 160 legislative districts included in the lower house of the Massachusetts General Court. It covers part of the city of New Bedford in Bristol County. Since 1991, Antonio Cabral of the Democratic Party has represented the district.

The current district geographic boundary overlaps with that of the Massachusetts Senate's 2nd Bristol and Plymouth district.

== Representatives ==
- Robert Taylor
- J. Roger Sisson
- Manuel Raposa
- Antone S. Aguiar Jr.
- Denis Lawrence
- Antonio F.D. Cabral, 1991-current

== See also ==
- List of Massachusetts House of Representatives elections
- List of Massachusetts General Courts
- Other Bristol County districts of the Massachusetts House of Representatives: 1st, 2nd, 3rd, 4th, 5th, 6th, 7th, 8th, 9th, 10th, 11th, 12th, 14th
- List of former districts of the Massachusetts House of Representatives

== Images ==
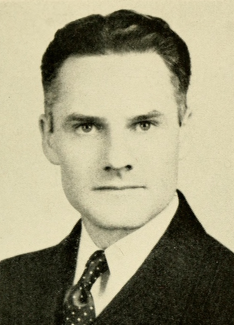
Robert Taylor

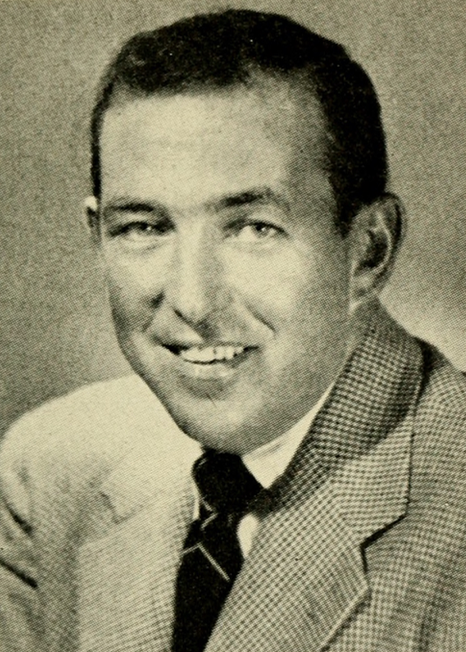
J. Roger Sisson

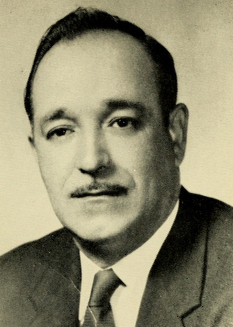
Manuel Raposa

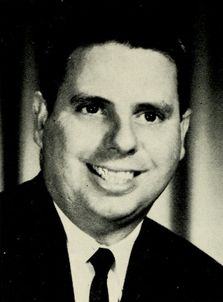
Antone Aguiar

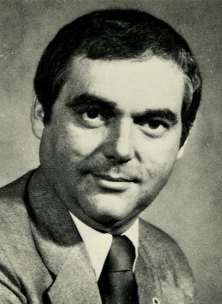
Denis Lawrence

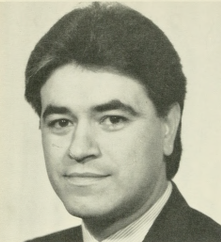
Antonio Cabral
