= Massachusetts House of Representatives' 2nd Bristol district =

American legislative district

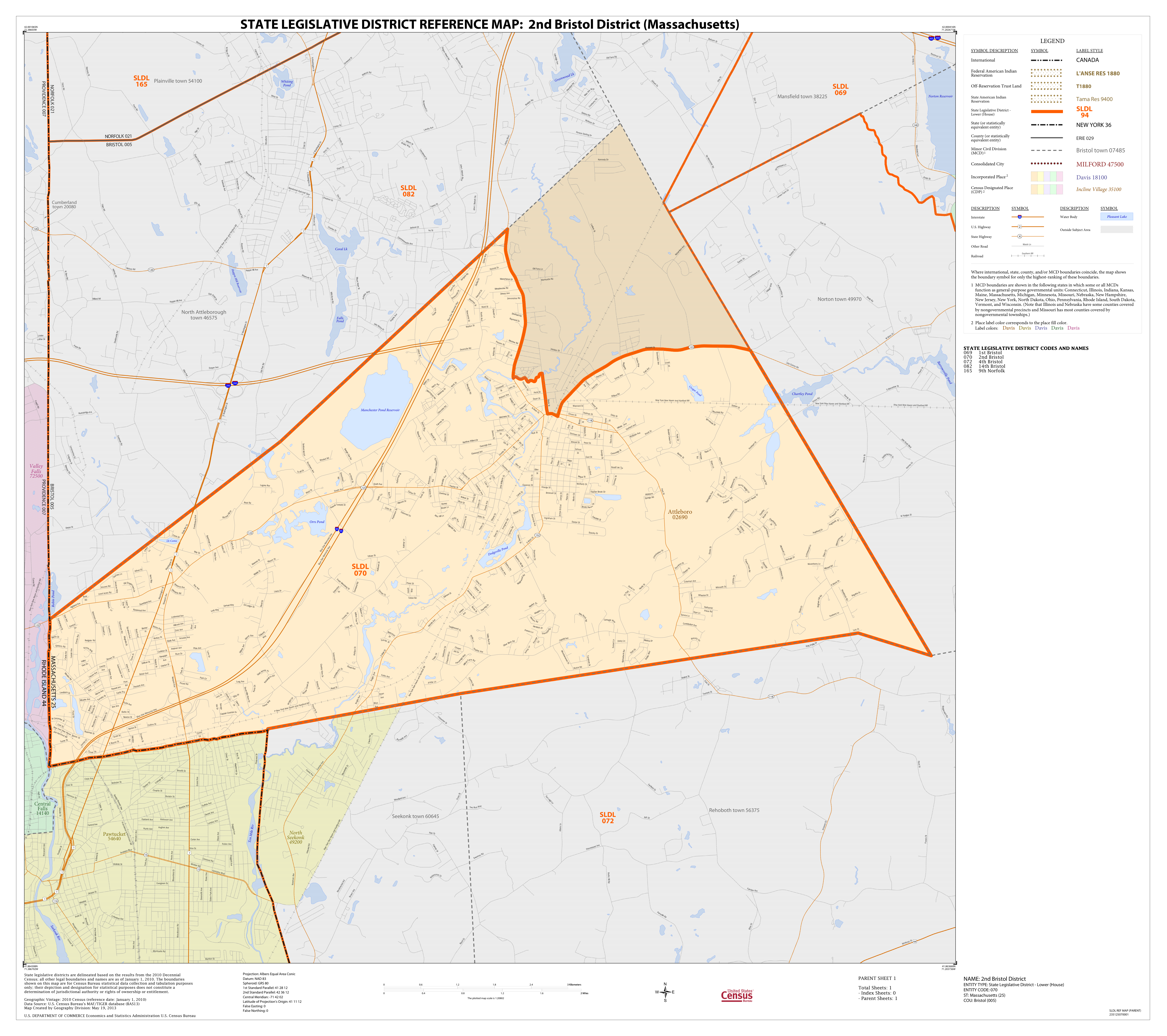
Map of Massachusetts House of Representatives' 2nd Bristol district, based on the 2010 United States census.

Massachusetts House of Representatives' 2nd Bristol district in the United States is one of 160 legislative districts included in the lower house of the Massachusetts General Court. It covers most of the City of Attleboro in Bristol County. Democrat Jim Hawkins of Attleboro has represented the district since 2018.

The current district geographic boundary overlaps with those of the Massachusetts Senate's Bristol and Norfolk and Norfolk, Bristol and Middlesex districts.

== Representatives ==
- John Crane, circa 1858
- Daniel S. Cobb, circa 1859
- William Blanding Rogerson, circa 1888
- Kenneth W. Keith, circa 1920
- Albert E. Wood, circa 1951
- Edward Paul Coury, circa 1975
- Stephen Karol, circa 1994
- John Lepper, 1995–2009
- Bill Bowles, 2009–2011
- George T. Ross, 2011–2013
- Paul Heroux, January 5, 2013 – January 2, 2018
- Jim Hawkins, 2018-current

== Former locales ==
The district previously covered:

- Easton, circa 1927
- Mansfield, circa 1872
- Norton, circa 1872

== See also ==
- List of Massachusetts House of Representatives elections
- Other Bristol County districts of the Massachusetts House of Representatives: 1st, 3rd, 4th, 5th, 6th, 7th, 8th, 9th, 10th, 11th, 12th, 13th, 14th
- List of Massachusetts General Courts
- List of former districts of the Massachusetts House of Representatives

== Images ==
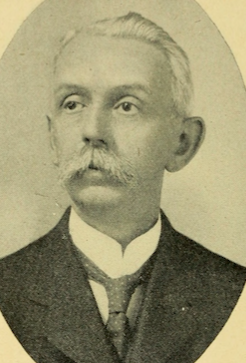
William L. Robinson

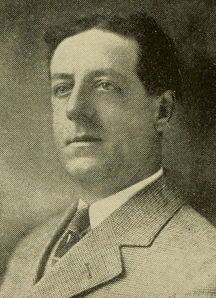
James Moran

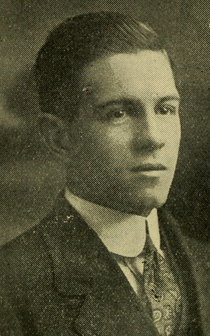
Everett William

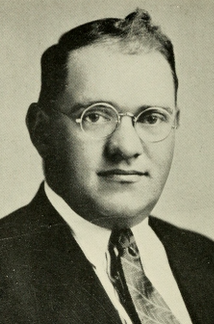
Roger McNamara

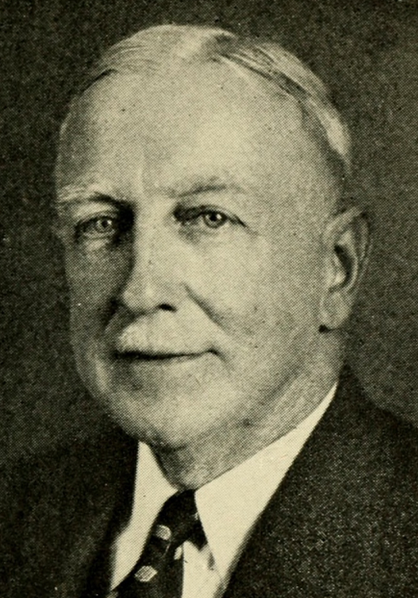
Albert Wood

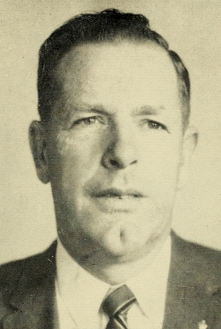
Walter O'Brien

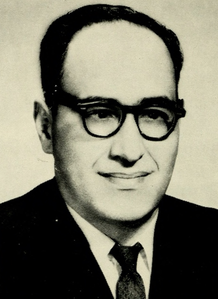
Edward Coury

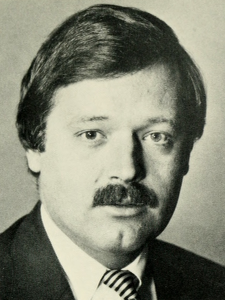
Stephen Karol

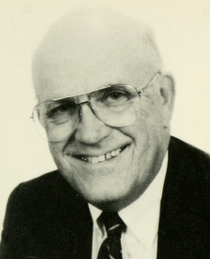
John Lepper
