= Massachusetts House of Representatives' 11th Bristol district =

American legislative district

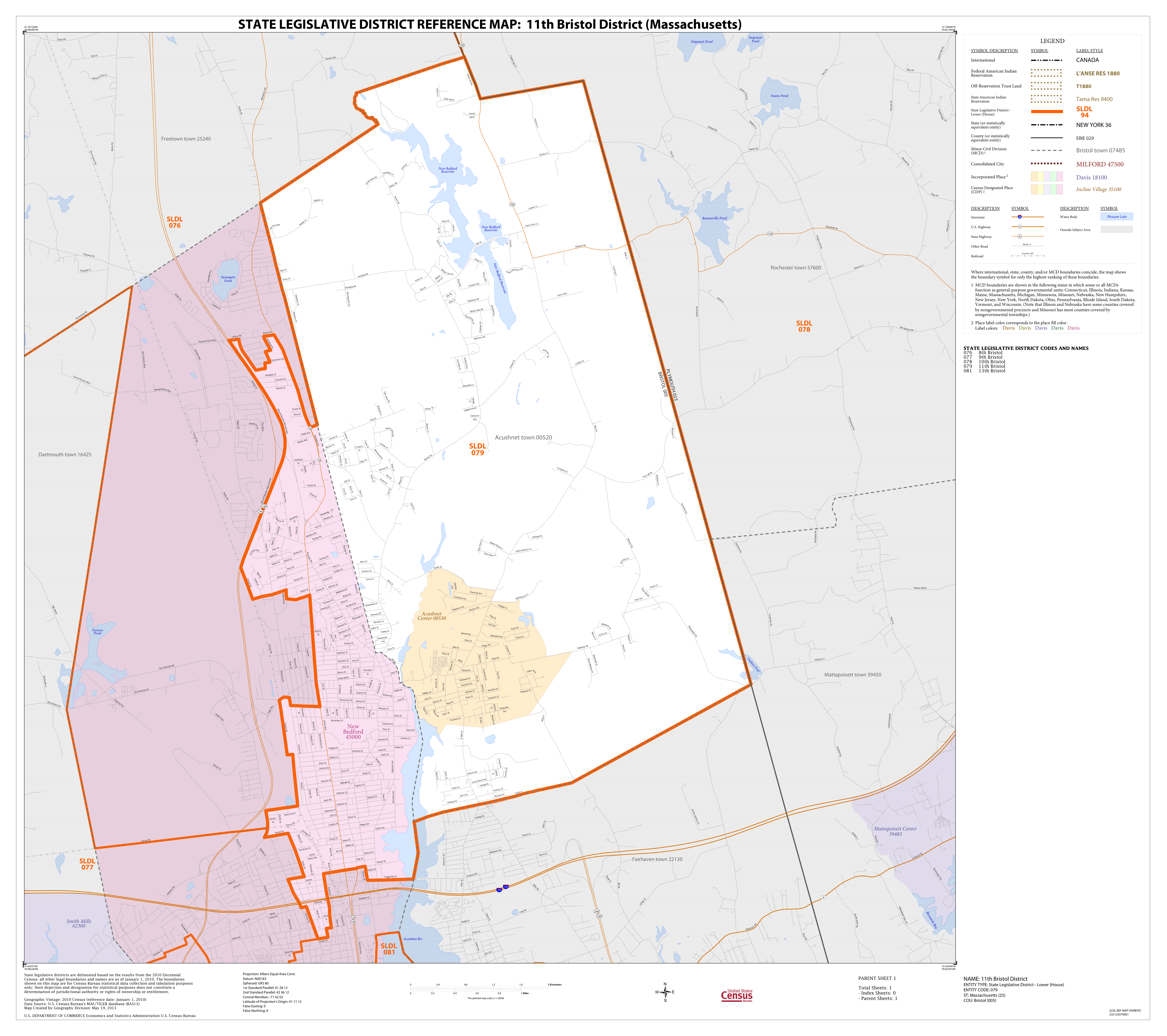
Map of Massachusetts House of Representatives' 11th Bristol district, based on the 2010 United States census.

Massachusetts House of Representatives' 11th Bristol district in the United States is one of 160 legislative districts included in the lower house of the Massachusetts General Court. It covers part of Bristol County. Democrat Chris Hendricks of New Bedford has represented the district since 2019.

== Locales represented ==
The district includes the following localities:

- Acushnet
- part of New Bedford

The current district geographic boundary overlaps with that of the Massachusetts Senate's 2nd Bristol & Plymouth district.

=== Former locales ===
The district previously covered:

- part of Fall River, circa 1927
- Somerset, circa 1927

== Representatives ==
- Robert L. Pitman, circa 1858
- Thomas H. Soule, circa 1858
- Samuel Watson, circa 1858–1859
- Nathan B. Gifford, circa 1859
- Augustus L. West, circa 1859
- James T. Bagshaw, circa 1920
- William Cyril Crossley, circa 1920
- Ernest A. Larocque, circa 1920
- Harold Clinton Nagle, circa 1951
- James Anthony O'Brien, circa 1951
- Carlton M. Viveiros, circa 1975
- Roger R. Goyette, 1979-1987
- Christopher Hendricks, 2019–current

== See also ==
- List of Massachusetts House of Representatives elections
- Other Bristol County districts of the Massachusetts House of Representatives: 1st, 2nd, 3rd, 4th, 5th, 6th, 7th, 8th, 9th, 10th, 12th, 13th, 14th
- List of Massachusetts General Courts
- List of former districts of the Massachusetts House of Representatives

== Images ==
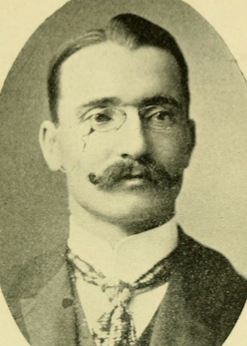
Charles Boivin

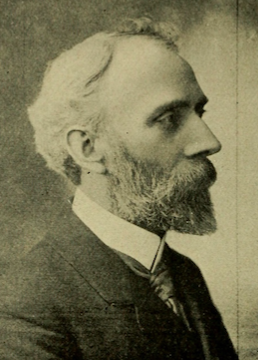
David Keefe

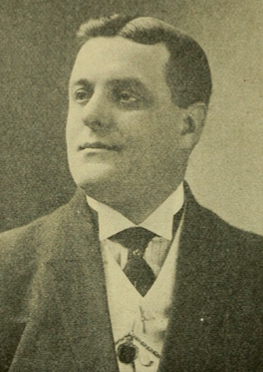
Isaac Willetts

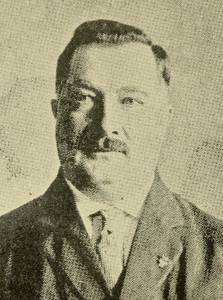
Ernest LaRocque

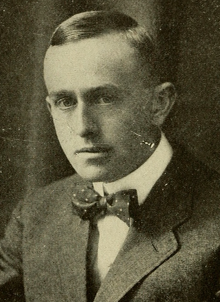
Frank Mulveny

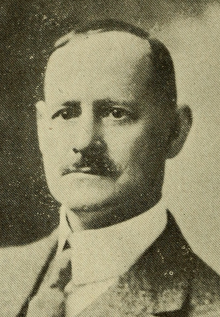
James Bagshaw

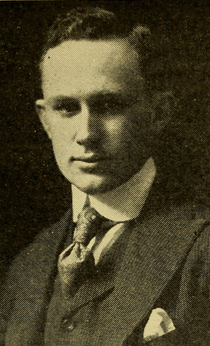
Thomas Charles Crowther

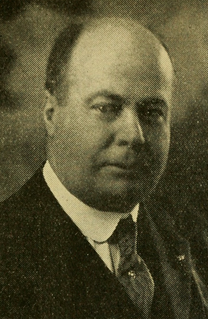
William Franklin Thomas

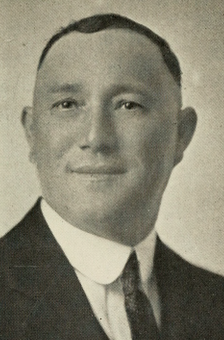
Albert Rubin

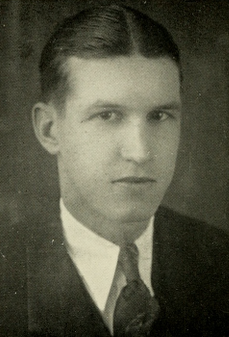
William Grant

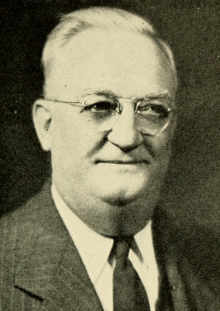
James O'Brien

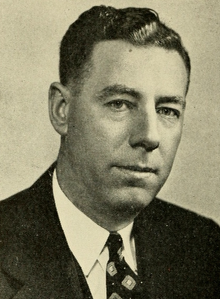
William White

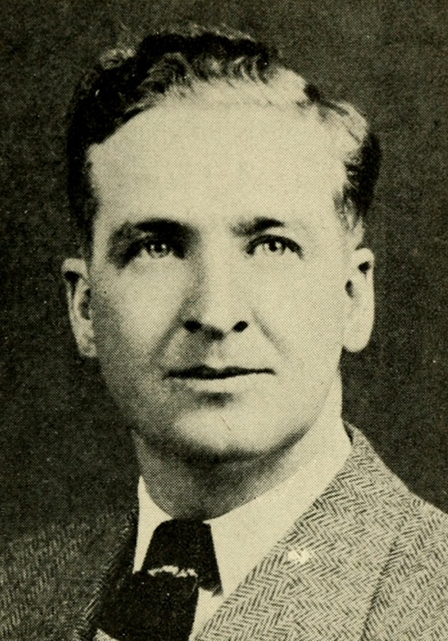
Harold Clinton Nagle

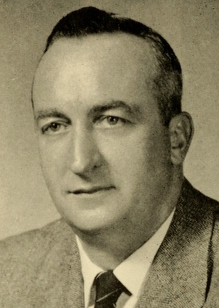
James Anthony O'Brien Jr.

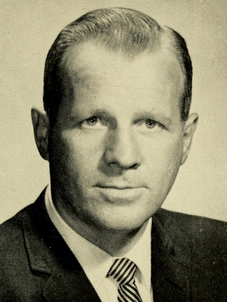
John Long

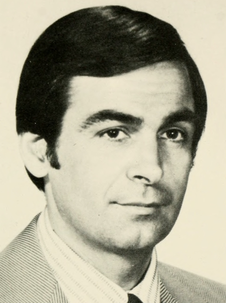
Carlton Viveiros

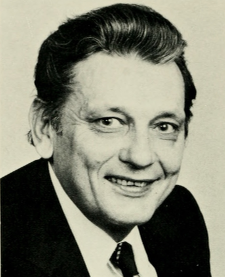
Roger Goyette

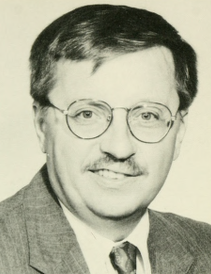
Robert Koczera
