= Massachusetts House of Representatives' 1st Bristol district =

American legislative district

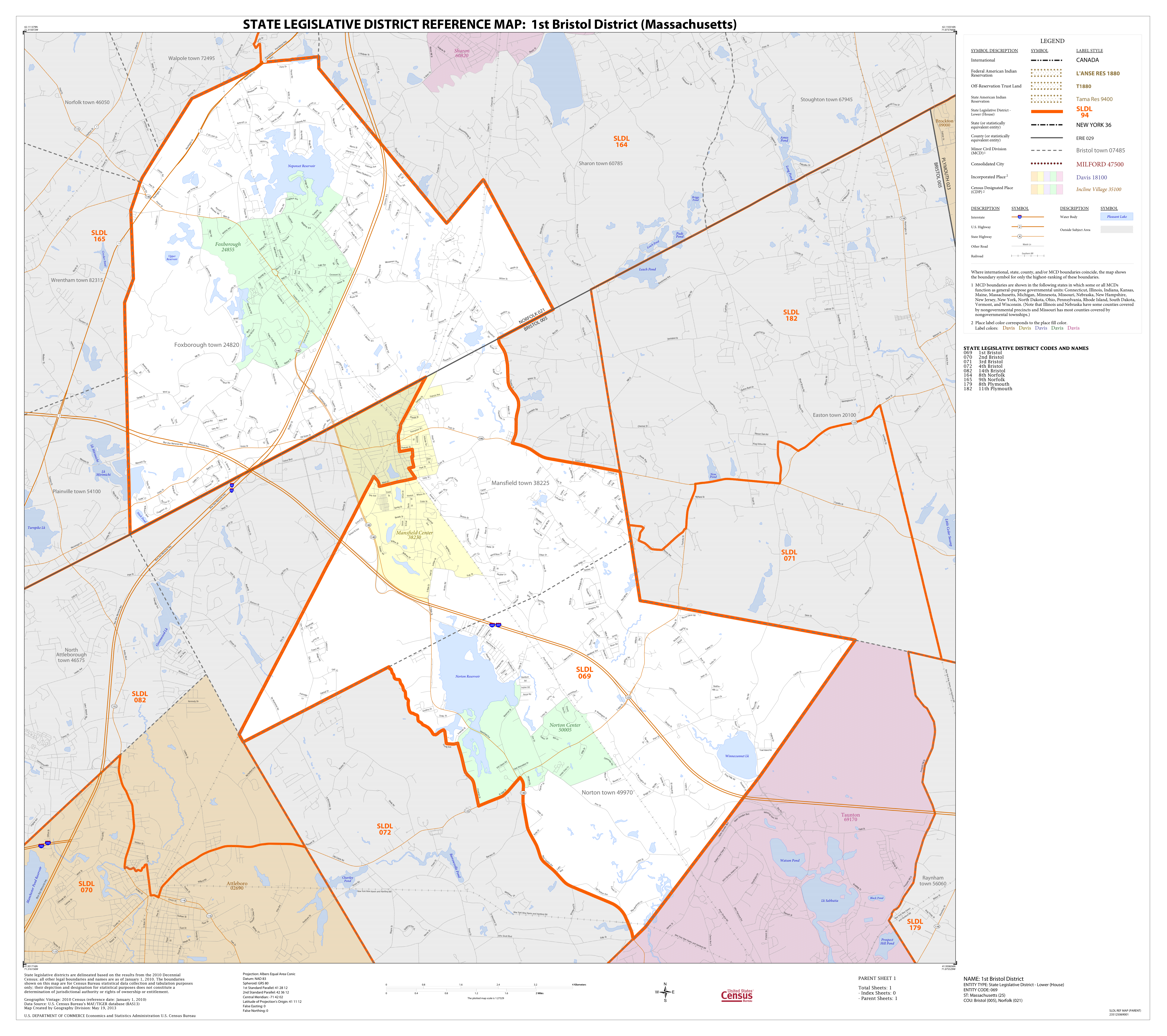
Map of Massachusetts House of Representatives' 1st Bristol district, based on the 2010 United States census.

Massachusetts House of Representatives' 1st Bristol district in the United States is one of 160 legislative districts included in the lower house of the Massachusetts General Court. It covers parts of Bristol County and Norfolk County. Republican Michael Chaisson has represented the district since 2025.

== Towns represented ==
The district includes the following localities:

- Foxborough
- Mansfield
- Norton

The current district geographic boundary overlaps with that of the Massachusetts Senate's Bristol and Norfolk district.

=== Former locales ===
The district previously covered:

- Attleboro, circa 1872, 1927
- North Attleborough, circa 1927

== Representatives ==
- William W. Blodgett, circa 1858-1859
- Horatio N. Richardson, circa 1858
- William D. Earl, circa 1859
- George R. Perry, circa 1888
- Abijah T. Wales, circa 1888
- Frank Coombs, circa 1908
- Samuel Holman, circa 1908
- William Bartlett, circa 1918
- William Plattner, circa 1920
- George M. Worrall, circa 1920
- Charles Sumner Holden, circa 1923
- Harry Kent, circa 1923
- Francis Kelley, circa 1935
- Fred Briggs, circa 1935
- Arthur Eaton Young, circa 1951
- Carlton Bliss, circa 1953
- George Spatcher, circa 1967
- Donald R. Gaudette, circa 1975
- Roger R. Goyette, 1977-1978
- William B. Vernon, circa 1991
- Barbara Hyland, 1992–2001
- Michael J. Coppola, 2001–2005
- Ginny Coppola, 2006–2007
- Fred Jay Barrows, 2009-2025
- Michael Chaisson, 2025-Present

== See also ==
- List of Massachusetts House of Representatives elections
- Other Bristol County districts of the Massachusetts House of Representatives: 2nd, 3rd, 4th, 5th, 6th, 7th, 8th, 9th, 10th, 11th, 12th, 13th, 14th
- List of Massachusetts General Courts
- List of former districts of the Massachusetts House of Representatives

== Images ==
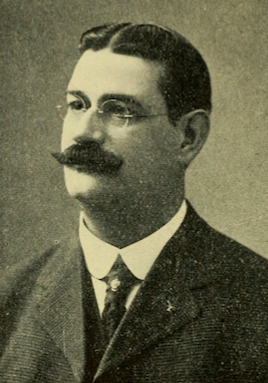
Frank Coombs

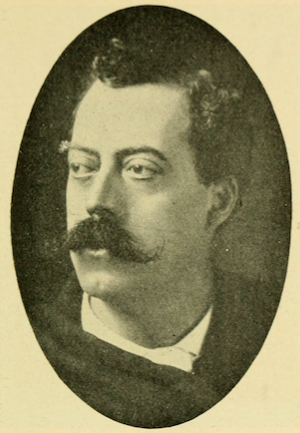
Samuel Holman

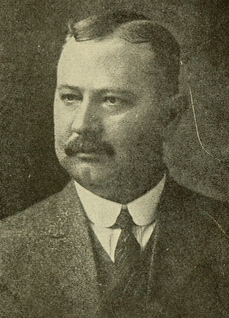
George Worrall

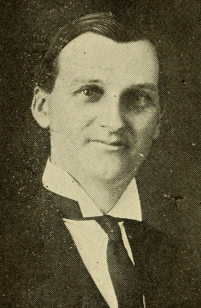
William Bartlett

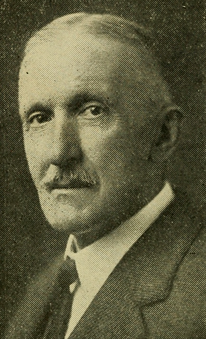
Charles Sumner Holden

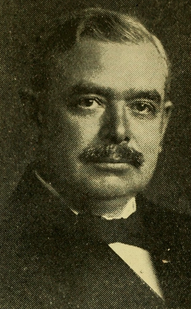
Harry Kent

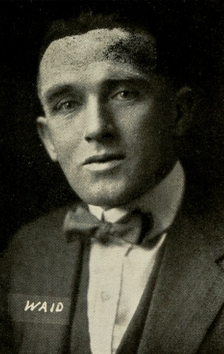
Francis Kelley

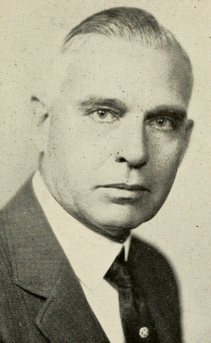
Fred Briggs

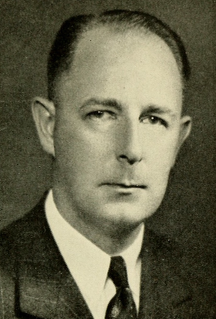
Arthur Young

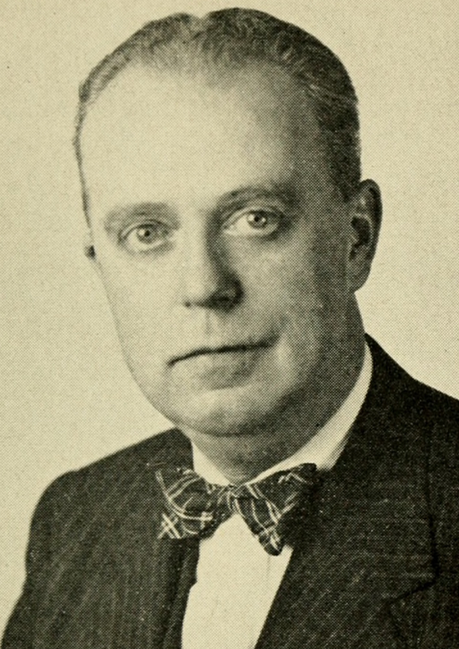
Carlton Bliss

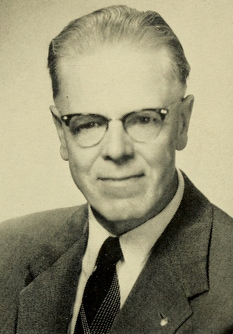
George Spatcher

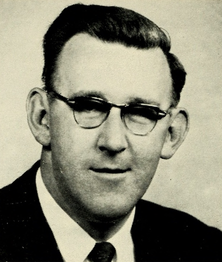
Donald Gaudette

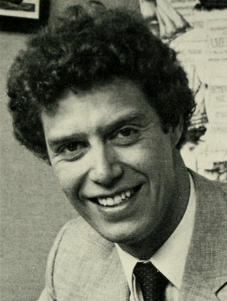
William Vernon

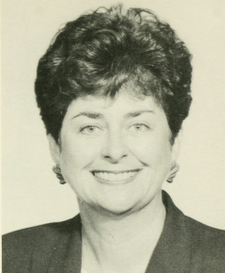
Barbara Hyland

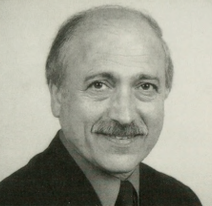
Michael Coppola
