= Massachusetts House of Representatives' 14th Bristol district =

American legislative district

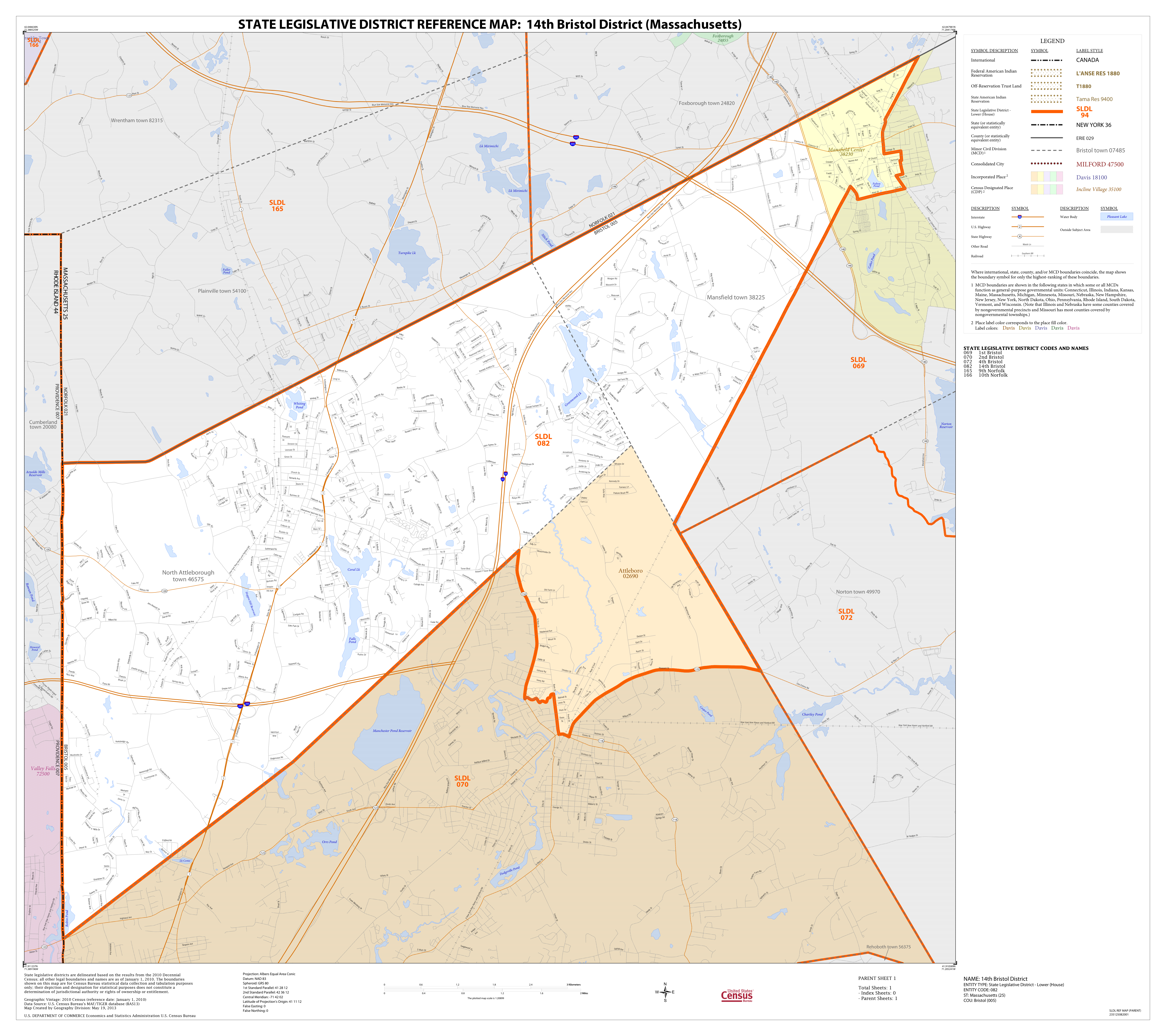
Map of Massachusetts House of Representatives' 14th Bristol district, based on the 2010 United States census.

Massachusetts House of Representatives' 14th Bristol district in the United States is one of 160 legislative districts included in the lower house of the Massachusetts General Court. It covers part of Bristol County. Democrat Adam Scanlon has represented the district since 2021.

== Locales represented ==
The district includes the following localities:

- part of Attleboro
- part of Mansfield
- North Attleborough

The current district geographic boundary overlaps with those of the Massachusetts Senate's Bristol and Norfolk district and Norfolk, Bristol and Middlesex district.

== Representatives ==
- John S. Ames, III
- Theodore J. Aleixo, Jr.
- Kevin Poirier
- Elizabeth A. Poirier, 2000-2021
- Adam Scanlon 2021-current

== See also ==
- List of Massachusetts House of Representatives elections
- List of Massachusetts General Courts
- Other Bristol County districts of the Massachusetts House of Representatives: 1st, 2nd, 3rd, 4th, 5th, 6th, 7th, 8th, 9th, 10th, 11th, 12th, 13th
- List of former districts of the Massachusetts House of Representatives

== Images ==
Portraits of legislators

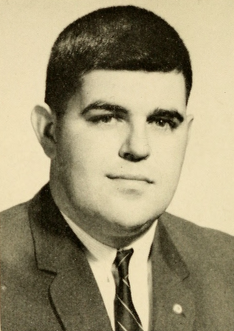
Donald Bliss

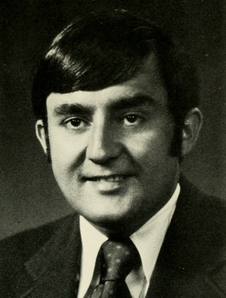
Theodore Aleixo

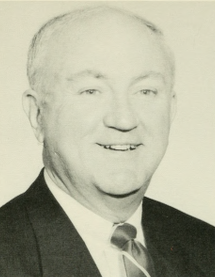
Kevin Poirier

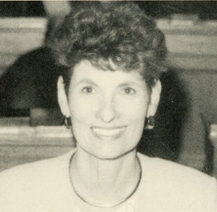
Elizabeth Poirier
