= List of former districts of the Massachusetts House of Representatives =

The following is a list of former districts of the Massachusetts House of Representatives in the United States. Legislative districts for elected representation in the Massachusetts House of Representatives are apportioned based on census information. Apportionment has occurred generally every ten years: in 1857, 1866, 1876, 1886, 1896, 1906, 1916, 1926, 1939, 1947,...2011.

There were no districts before 1857. Representatives were elected from each town and city. The number of House members "fluctuated from a low of 131 members in 1782 to a high of 748 members in 1812." Starting in 1857, 240 House districts were "drawn by county boards on the basis of statutory assignment of seats to each county." A 1974 referendum, supported by the League of Women Voters, reduced the number of seats from 240 to 160.

== Former districts ==
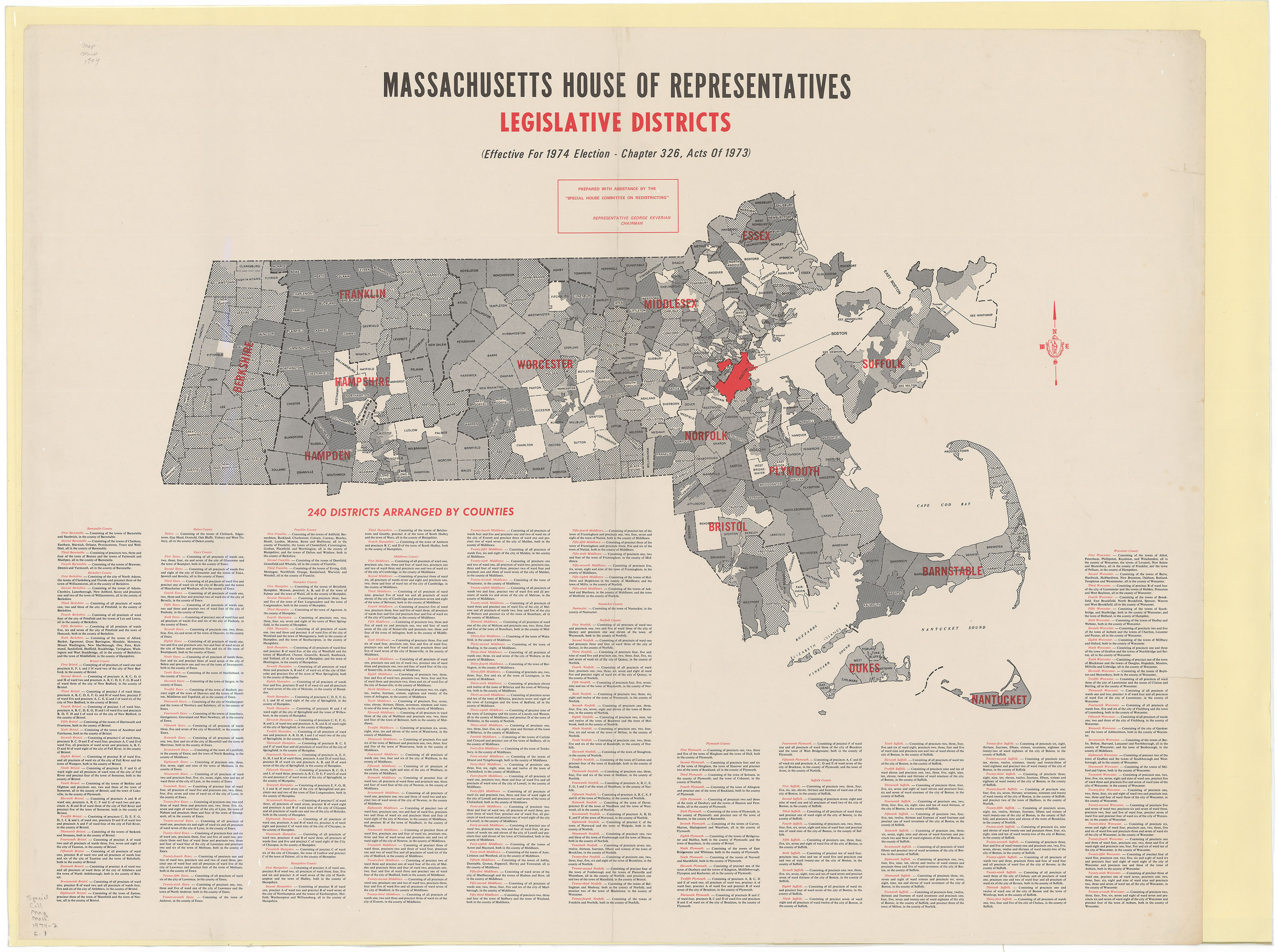
Map of 240 districts of the Massachusetts House of Representatives apportioned in 1973

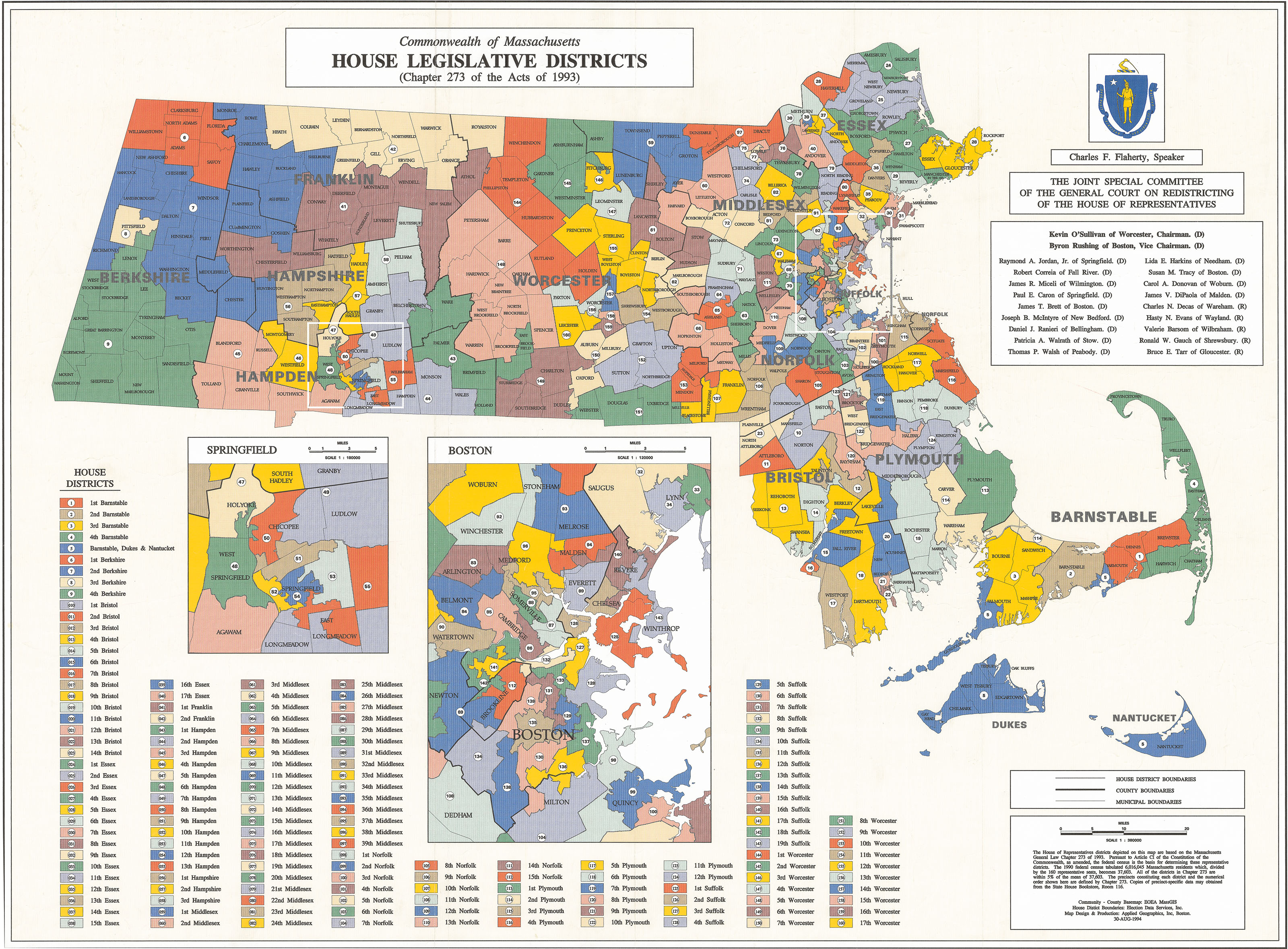
Map of the 160 districts of the Massachusetts House of Representatives apportioned in 1993

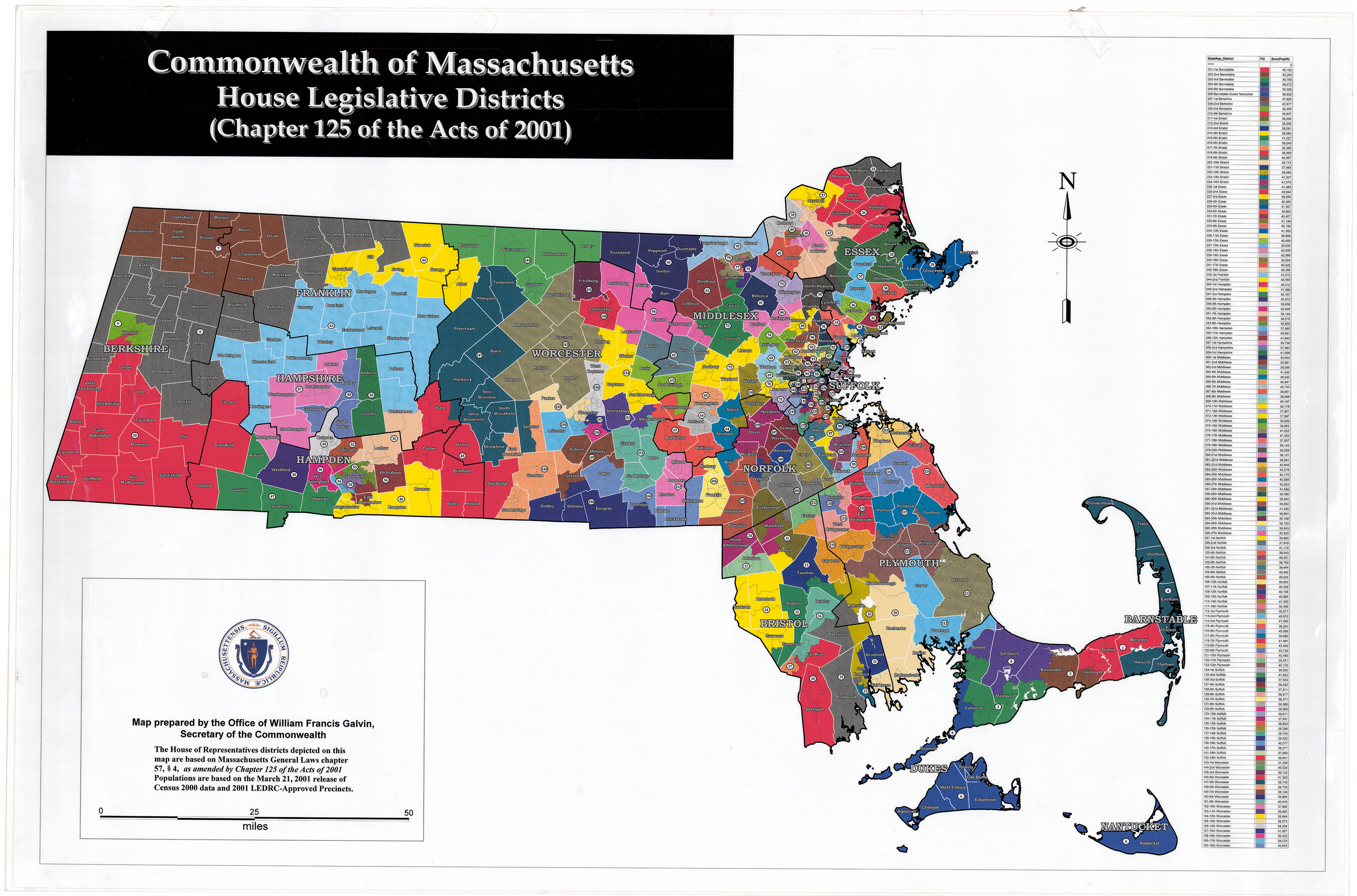
Map of the 160 districts of the Massachusetts House of Representatives apportioned in 2001

- 4th Berkshire district
- 5th Berkshire district
- 6th Berkshire district
- 7th Berkshire district
- 8th Berkshire district
- 9th Berkshire district
- 15th Bristol district
- 16th Bristol district
- 17th Bristol district
- 18th Bristol district
- 1st Dukes district
- Cape and Islands district
- 19th Essex district
- 20th Essex district
- 21st Essex district
- 22nd Essex district
- 23rd Essex district
- 24th Essex district
- 25th Essex district
- 26th Essex district
- 27th Essex district
- 3rd Franklin district
- 4th Franklin district
- 5th Franklin district
- 6th Franklin district
- 7th Franklin district
- 13th Hampden district
- 14th Hampden district
- 15th Hampden district
- 16th Hampden district
- 17th Hampden district
- 18th Hampden district
- 19th Hampden district
- 20th Hampden district
- 4th Hampshire district
- 5th Hampshire district
- 6th Hampshire district
- 38th Middlesex district
- 39th Middlesex district
- 40th Middlesex district
- 41st Middlesex district
- 42nd Middlesex district
- 43rd Middlesex district
- 44th Middlesex district
- 45th Middlesex district
- 46th Middlesex district
- 47th Middlesex district
- 48th Middlesex district
- 49th Middlesex district
- 50th Middlesex district
- 51st Middlesex district
- 52nd Middlesex district
- 53rd Middlesex district
- 54th Middlesex district
- 55th Middlesex district
- 56th Middlesex district
- 57th Middlesex district
- 58th Middlesex district
- 59th Middlesex district
- 1st Nantucket district
- 16th Norfolk district
- 17th Norfolk district
- 18th Norfolk district
- 19th Norfolk district
- 20th Norfolk district
- 21st Norfolk district
- 22nd Norfolk district
- 23rd Norfolk district
- 24th Norfolk district
- 13th Plymouth district
- 14th Plymouth district
- 15th Plymouth district
- 20th Suffolk district
- 21st Suffolk district
- 22nd Suffolk district
- 23rd Suffolk district
- 24th Suffolk district
- 25th Suffolk district
- 26th Suffolk district
- 27th Suffolk district
- 28th Suffolk district
- 29th Suffolk district
- 30th Suffolk district
- 31st Suffolk district
- 19th Worcester district
- 20th Worcester district
- 21st Worcester district
- 22nd Worcester district
- 23rd Worcester district
- 24th Worcester district
- 25th Worcester district
- 26th Worcester district
- 27th Worcester district
- 28th Worcester district
- 29th Worcester district
- 30th Worcester district

== See also ==
- List of current districts of the Massachusetts House of Representatives
- History of the Massachusetts General Court
- List of Massachusetts General Courts
- List of former districts of the Massachusetts Senate
- Apportionment in US state legislatures
