= Velis =

Velis is a surname. Notable people with the surname include:

- Andrea Velis, American operatic tenor
- John Velis, American politician
- Peter A. Velis, American judge

== See also ==
- Veliš (disambiguation), several locations in the Czech Republic
- Pipistrel Velis Electro, a Slovenian electric aircraft design
