= Massachusetts House of Representatives' 1st Hampden district =

American legislative district

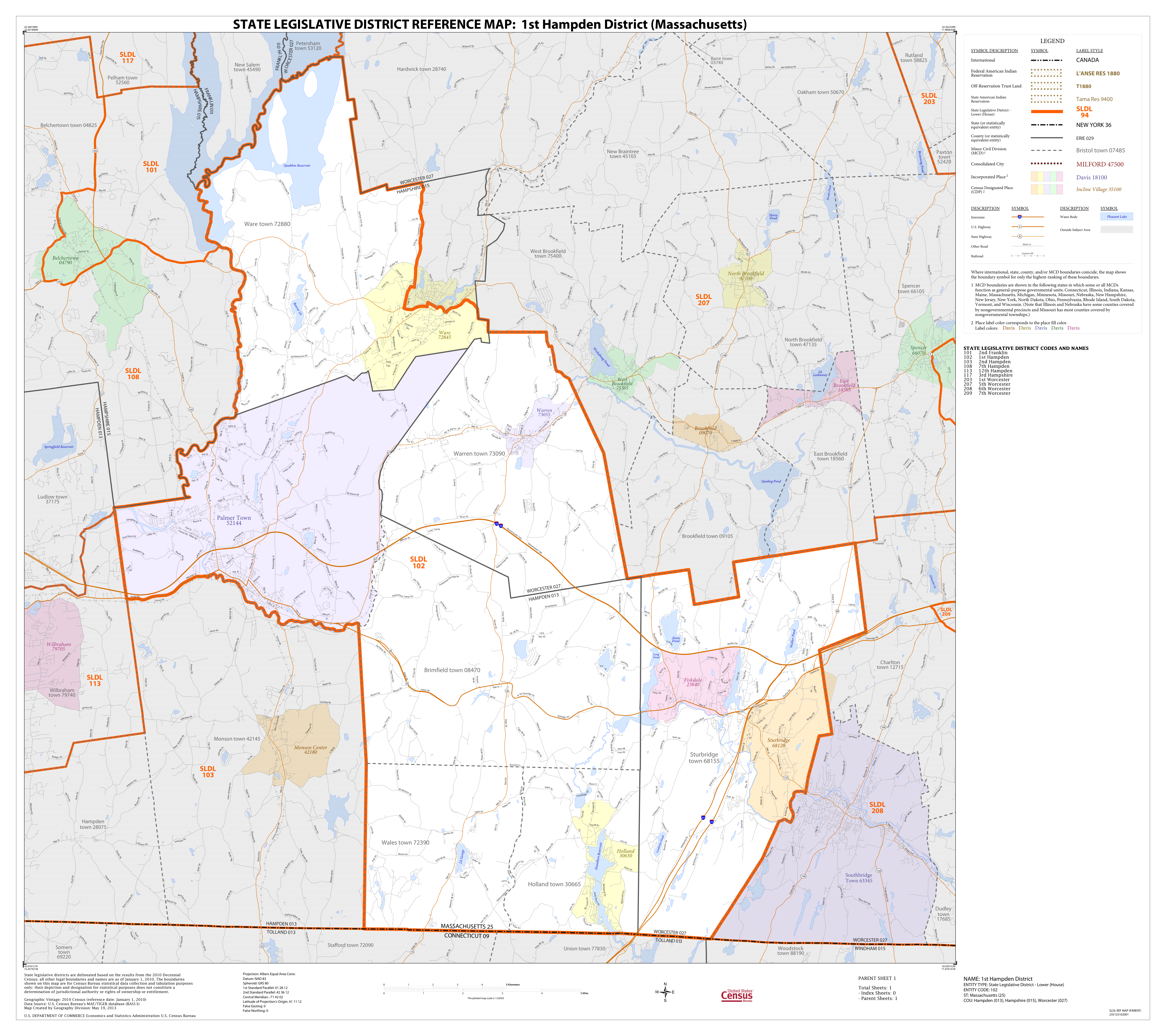
Map of Massachusetts House of Representatives' 1st Hampden district, based on the 2010 United States census.

Massachusetts House of Representatives' 1st Hampden district in the United States is one of 160 legislative districts included in the lower house of the Massachusetts General Court. It covers parts of Hampden County, Hampshire County, and Worcester County. Republican Todd Smola of Warren has represented the district since 2005.

== Towns represented ==
The district includes the following localities:

- Brimfield
- Holland
- Palmer
- Sturbridge
- Wales
- part of Ware
- Warren

The current district geographic boundary overlaps with that of the Massachusetts Senate's Worcester, Hampden, Hampshire and Middlesex district.

=== Former locales ===
The district previously covered Monson, circa 1872.

== Representatives ==
- John W. Foster, circa 1858
- Paul W. Paige, circa 1859
- Charles Henry Knox, circa 1888
- Ernest Hobson, circa 1908
- John Hamilton, circa 1918
- Daniel W. O'Connor, circa 1920
- Frank Smith, circa 1935
- Raymond H. Beach, circa 1951
- Clarence B. Brown, circa 1951
- George Smith, circa 1953
- Alexander Lolas, circa 1967
- John B. Perry, circa 1975
- William Moriarty, circa 1986
- Patrick Landers, 1987–1999
- Reed V. Hillman, 1999–2005
- Todd M. Smola, 2005-current

== See also ==
- List of Massachusetts House of Representatives elections
- Other Hampden County districts of the Massachusetts House of Representatives: 2nd, 3rd, 4th, 5th, 6th, 7th, 8th, 9th, 10th, 11th, 12th
- Hampden County districts of the Massachusett Senate: Berkshire, Hampshire, Franklin, and Hampden; Hampden; 1st Hampden and Hampshire; 2nd Hampden and Hampshire
- List of Massachusetts General Courts
- List of former districts of the Massachusetts House of Representatives

== Images ==
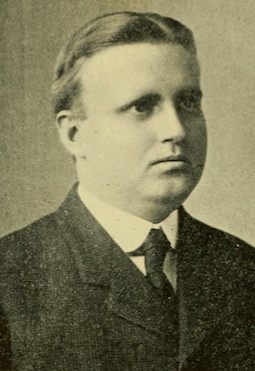
Ernest Hobson

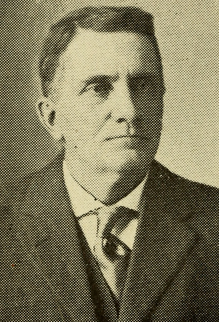
John Hamilton

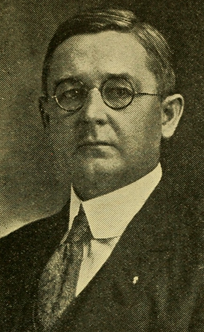
Daniel O'Connor

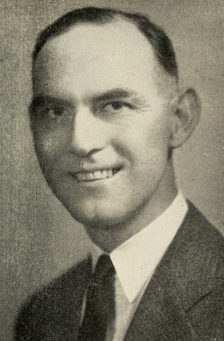
Frank Smith

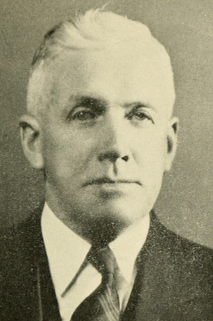
Clarence Brown

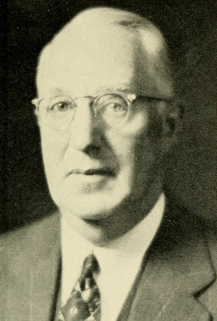
Raymond Beach

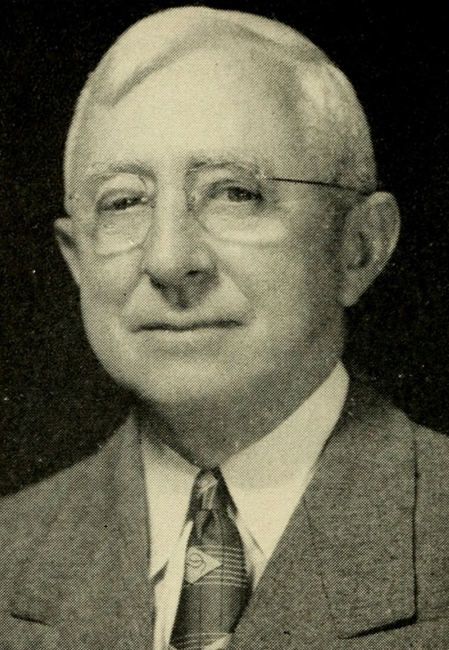
George Smith

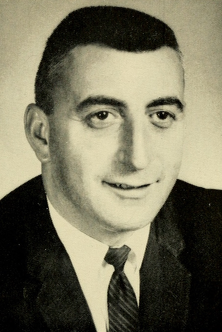
Alexander Lolas

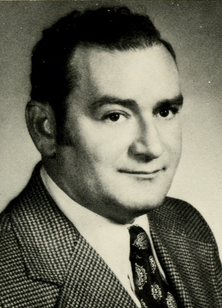
John Perry

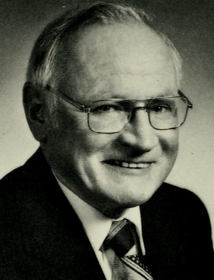
William Moriarty

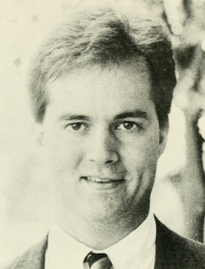
Patrick Landers
