= Massachusetts House of Representatives' 3rd Hampden district =

American legislative district

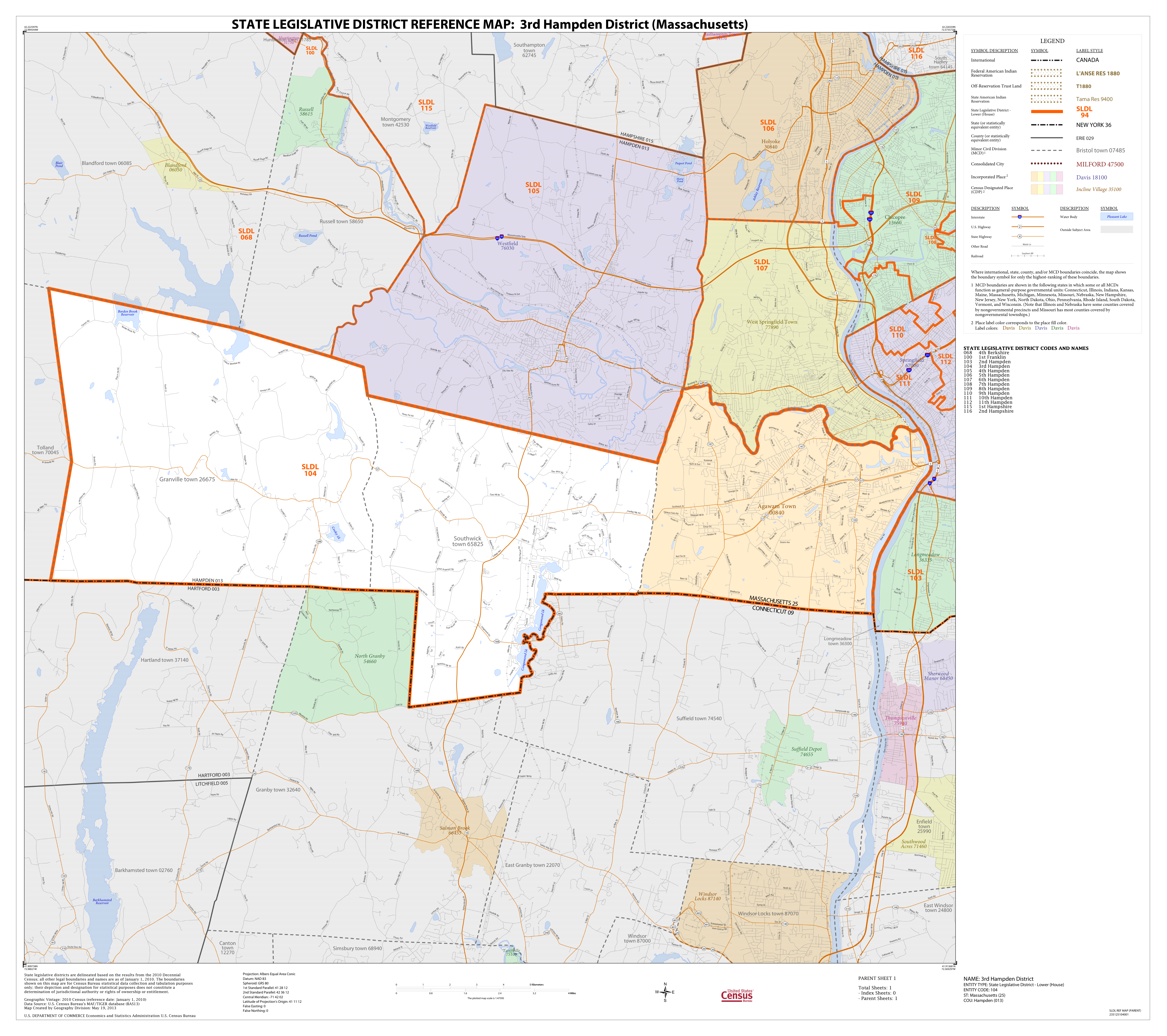
Map of Massachusetts House of Representatives' 3rd Hampden district, based on the 2010 United States census.

Massachusetts House of Representatives' 3rd Hampden district in the United States is one of 160 legislative districts included in the lower house of the Massachusetts General Court. It covers part of Hampden and Hampshire Counties. Republican Nick Boldyga of Southwick has represented the district since 2011.

== Towns represented ==
The district includes the following localities:

- Agawam
- Blandford
- Chester
- Granville
- Huntington
- Middlefield
- Montgomery
- Russell
- Southwick
- Tolland

The current district geographic boundary overlaps with that of the Massachusetts Senate's 2nd Hampden and Hampshire district.

=== Former locale ===
The district previously covered part of Springfield, circa 1872.

== Representatives ==
- Roderick Burt, circa 1858
- Randolph Stebbins, circa 1859
- Reuben Winchester, circa 1888
- William H. Grady, circa 1920
- John Mitchell, circa 1920
- Ernest Deroy, circa 1951
- Edward W. Connelly, circa 1975
- Nicholas A. Boldyga, 2011-current

== See also ==
- List of Massachusetts House of Representatives elections
- Other Hampden County districts of the Massachusetts House of Representatives: 1st, 2nd, 4th, 5th, 6th, 7th, 8th, 9th, 10th, 11th, 12th
- Hampden County districts of the Massachusett Senate: Berkshire, Hampshire, Franklin, and Hampden; Hampden; 1st Hampden and Hampshire; 2nd Hampden and Hampshire
- List of Massachusetts General Courts
- List of former districts of the Massachusetts House of Representatives

== Images ==
Portraits of legislators

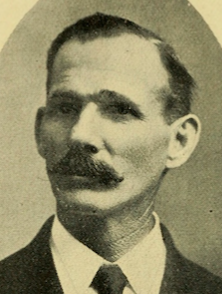
Thomas Walsh

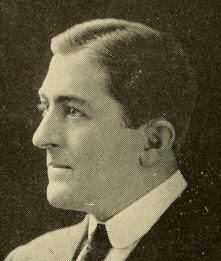
John Mitchell

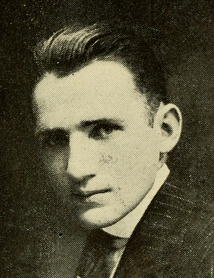
William Granfield

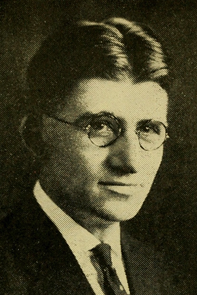
Patrick Granfield

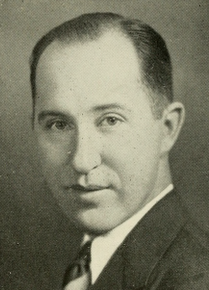
Raymond O'Connell

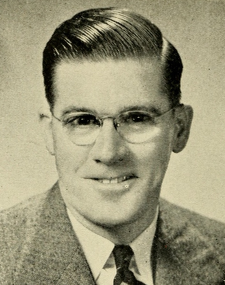
John Riordan

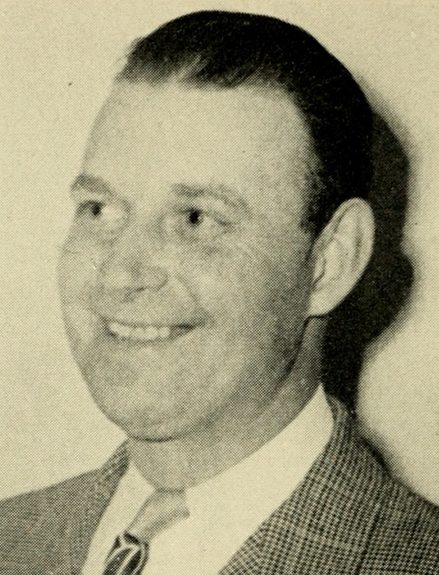
George Raymand Como

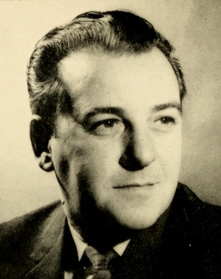
Roger Bernashe

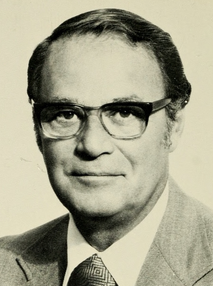
Edward Connelly

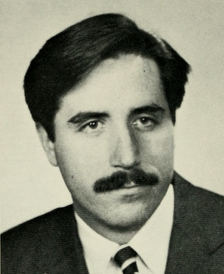
Michael Walsh

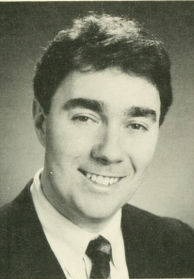
Daniel Keenan

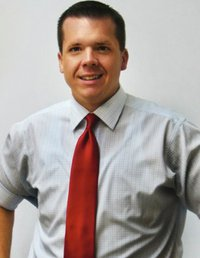
Nicholas Boldyga
