= Massachusetts Senate's Berkshire, Hampden, Franklin and Hampshire district =

American legislative district

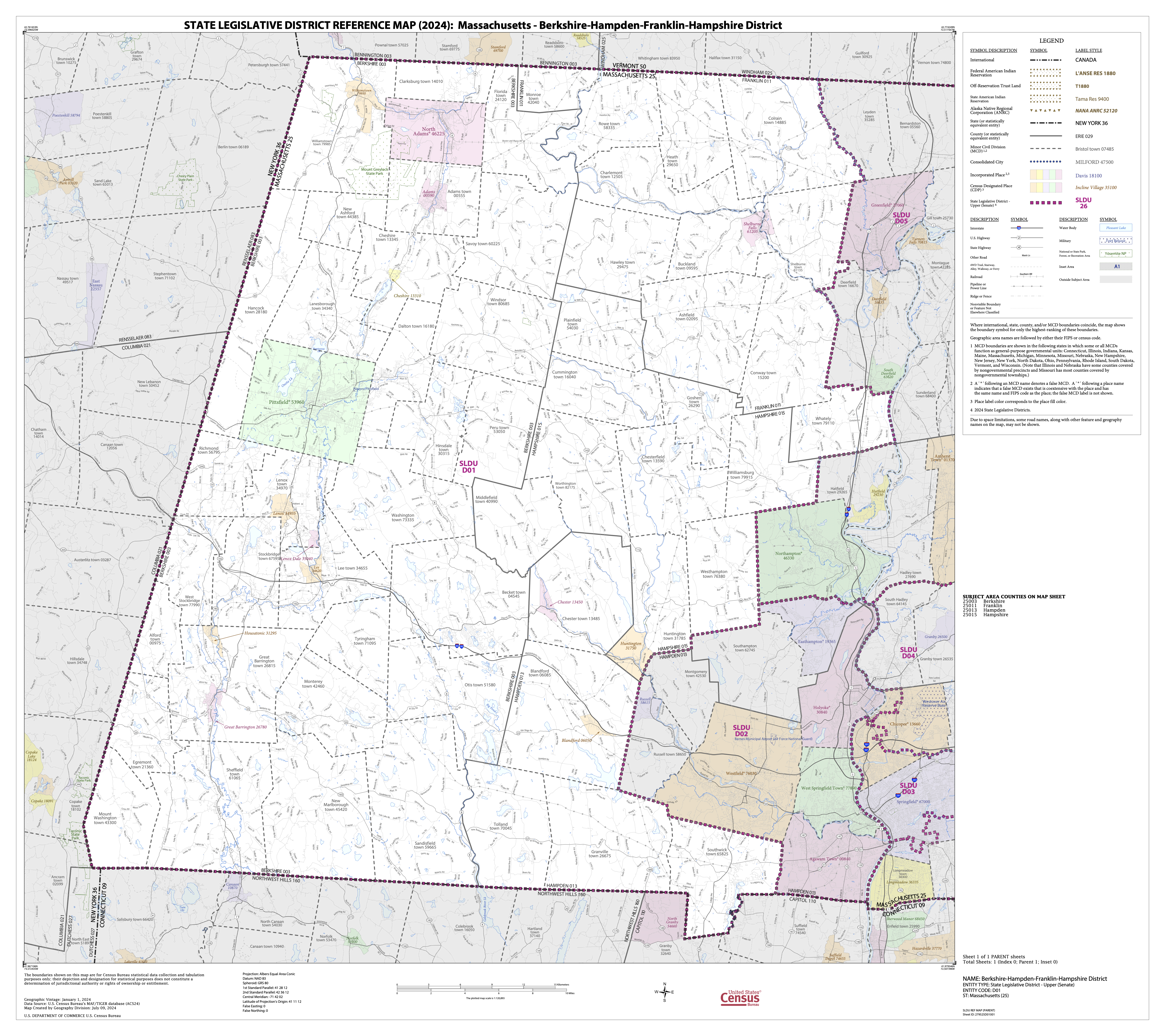
Map of Massachusetts Senate's Berkshire, Hampden, Franklin and Hampshire district, based on the 2020 United States census.

Berkshire, Hampden, Franklin and Hampshire district is one of 40 districts in the Massachusetts Senate. The district comprises all of Berkshire County and parts of Hampden, Franklin and Hampshire counties. Democrat Paul Mark of Pittsfield has represented the district since 2023.

The district had been used from 1991 through 2003 before it was eliminated in redistricting. It was restored as the Berkshire, Hampshire, Franklin and Hampden district in 2013 and renamed in 2023.

== List of senators ==
Senator	Party	Years	Legis.	Electoral history
Jane Swift	Republican	1993 – 1997	177th 178th 179th	Redistricted from the Berkshire district. Re-elected in 1992. Re-elected in 1994. Retired to run for U.S. House of Representatives.
Andrea F. Nuciforo Jr.	Democratic	1997 – 2003	180th 181st 182nd	Elected in 1996. Re-elected in 1998. Re-elected in 2000. Redistricted to the Berkshire, Hampshire and Franklin district.
District eliminated in 2003. District restored in 2013 as the Berkshire, Hampshire, Franklin and Hampden district.
Benjamin Downing	Democratic	2013 – January 4, 2017	188th 189th	Redistricted from the Berkshire, Hampshire and Franklin district. Re-elected in 2012. Re-elected in 2014. Retired.
Adam G. Hinds	Democratic	January 4, 2017 – September 25, 2022	190th 191st 192nd	Elected in 2016. Re-elected in 2018. Re-elected in 2020. Retired to run for lieutenant governor of Massachusetts. Resigned to become chief executive officer of the Edward M. Kennedy Institute.
Renamed to the Berkshire, Hampden, Franklin and Hampshire district.
Paul Mark	Democratic	January 4, 2023 – Present	193rd 194th	Elected in 2022. Re-elected in 2024.

== See also ==
- Other Hampden County districts of the Massachusett Senate: Hampden; 1st Hampden and Hampshire; 2nd Hampden and Hampshire
- Other Hampshire County districts of the Massachusett Senate: 1st Hampden and Hampshire; 2nd Hampden and Hampshire; Hampshire, Franklin and Worcester
- Berkshire County districts of the Massachusetts House of Representatives: 1st, 2nd, 3rd, 4th
- Franklin County districts of the Massachusetts House of Representatives: 1st, 2nd
- Hampden County districts of the Massachusetts House of Representatives: 1st, 2nd, 3rd, 4th, 5th, 6th, 7th, 8th, 9th, 10th, 11th, 12th
- Hampshire County districts of the Massachusetts House of Representatives: 1st, 2nd, 3rd
