= Steven Pierce =

American politician

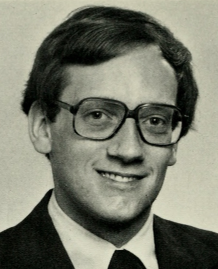
- Pierce c. 1983

Member of the Massachusetts House of Representatives from the 4th Hampden district
- In office 1979–1991
- Preceded by: John F. Coffey
- Succeeded by: Michael Knapik

Personal details
- Born: October 10, 1949 (age 76) Johnstown, New York
- Party: Republican
- Education: Union College (BA); Duke University (JD)
- Profession: Attorney

Steven D. Pierce (born October 10, 1949) is a retired Massachusetts jurist and politician who most recently served as chief justice of the Massachusetts Housing Court. He retired from the Housing Court September 2015.

A graduate of Union College and the Duke University School of Law, Pierce worked as an attorney before being elected to the Massachusetts House of Representatives in 1978. He was the House Minority Whip (1983–1987) and the House Minority Leader (1987–1991).

Pierce sought the Republican nomination for Governor in 1990. Pierce was considered the favorite to win the nomination. He won the vote at the State Convention and led his opponent William Weld in opinion polls by as much as 25%. However, on September 18, he lost the Republican Primary to Weld 61%-39%. Weld later appointed Pierce to the position of Secretary of Communities and Development.

In 1991, Pierce ran in a special election for the Massachusetts's 1st congressional seat. He won the Republican nomination, but lost in the general election to Democrat John Olver.

Pierce rejoined the Weld administration in 1993 as a senior adviser to the governor. In 1994, he was appointed executive director of the Massachusetts Housing Finance Agency (later known as MassHousing). He left MassHousing in 2001 to serve as chief legal counsel to acting governor Jane M. Swift.

Shortly before her term expired, Swift nominated Pierce to be the chief justice of the Massachusetts Housing Court. He was confirmed by the Massachusetts Governor's Council 6–2.

Political offices
Preceded by William G. Robinson	Minority Leader of the Massachusetts House of Representatives; 1987 – 1991	Succeeded by Peter Forman
Preceded by Iris Holland	Minority Whip of the Massachusetts House of Representatives; 1983 – 1987	Succeeded by Lucile Hicks
Preceded by Amy Anthony	Secretary of Communities and Development; 1991 – 1991	Succeeded by Mary L. Padula
