= Massachusetts House of Representatives' 10th Hampden district =

American legislative district

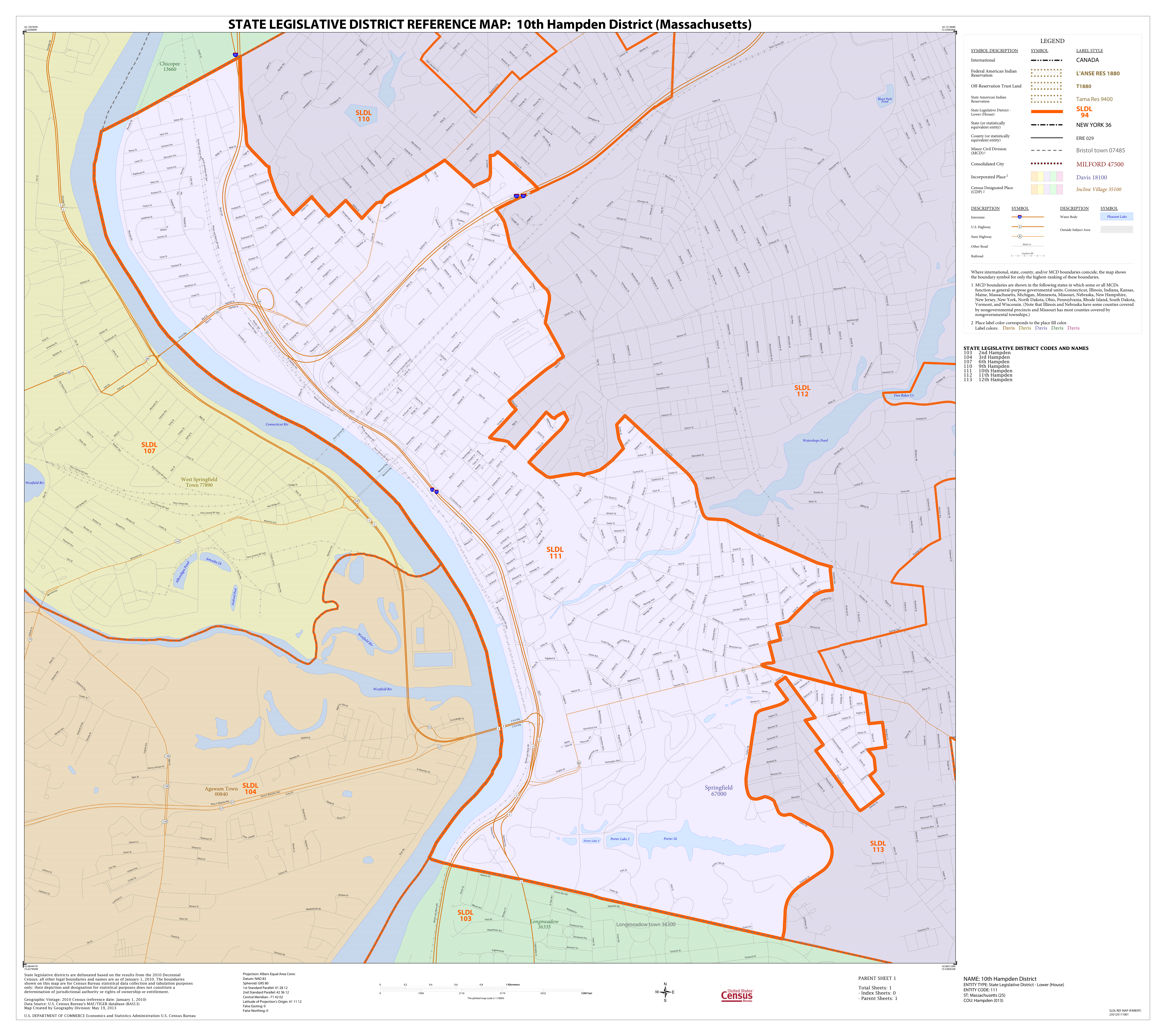
Map of Massachusetts House of Representatives' 10th Hampden district, based on the 2010 United States census.

Massachusetts House of Representatives' 10th Hampden district in the United States is one of 160 legislative districts included in the lower house of the Massachusetts General Court. It covers part of the city of Springfield in Hampden County. Democrat Carlos González of Springfield has represented the district since 2015.

The current district geographic boundary overlaps with those of the Massachusetts Senate's 1st Hampden and Hampshire district and Hampden district.

== Representatives ==
- Geo. Green, circa 1858
- Addison Gage, circa 1859
- Charles F. Grosvenor, circa 1888
- Lawrence F. Dowd, circa 1920
- Daniel Joseph Bresnahan, circa 1951
- Theodore J. Trudeau, circa 1975
- Anthony M. Scibelli
- Cheryl Coakley-Rivera
- Carlos González, 2015-current

== See also ==
- List of Massachusetts House of Representatives elections
- Other Hampden County districts of the Massachusetts House of Representatives: 1st, 2nd, 3rd, 4th, 5th, 6th, 7th, 8th, 9th, 11th, 12th
- Hampden County districts of the Massachusett Senate: Berkshire, Hampshire, Franklin, and Hampden; Hampden; 1st Hampden and Hampshire; 2nd Hampden and Hampshire
- List of Massachusetts General Courts
- List of former districts of the Massachusetts House of Representatives

== Images ==
Portraits of legislators

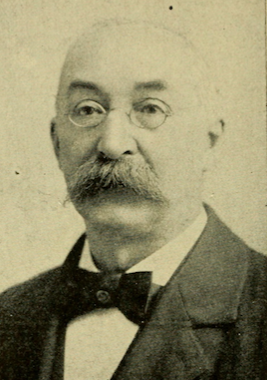
Adam Leining

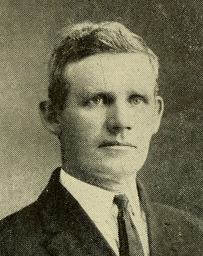
John Cronin

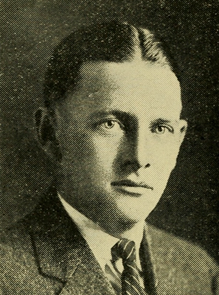
Francis Peter Clark

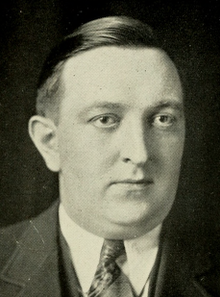
Andrew Coakley

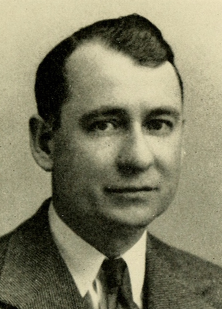
Francis Gregory

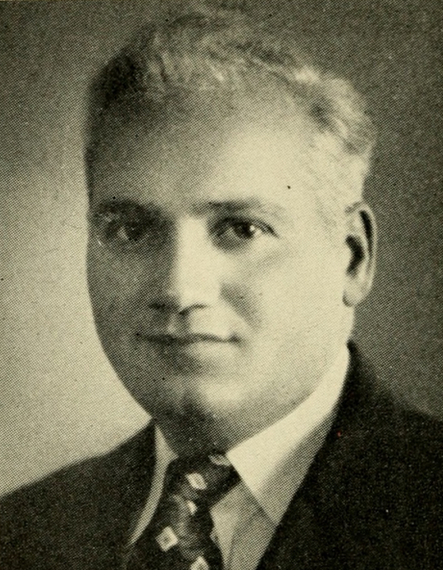
Armand Tancrati

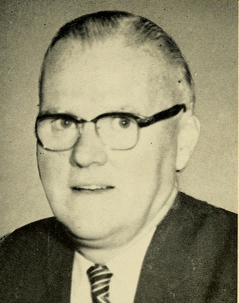
Arthur McKenna

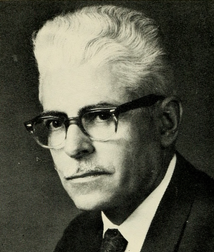
Theodore Trudeau

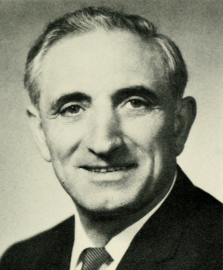
Anthony Scibelli

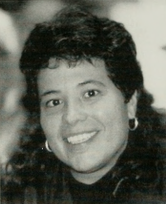
Cheryl Rivera

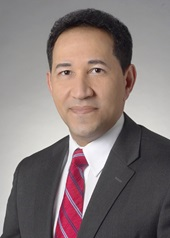
Carlos González
