= Massachusetts House of Representatives' 6th Hampden district =

American legislative district

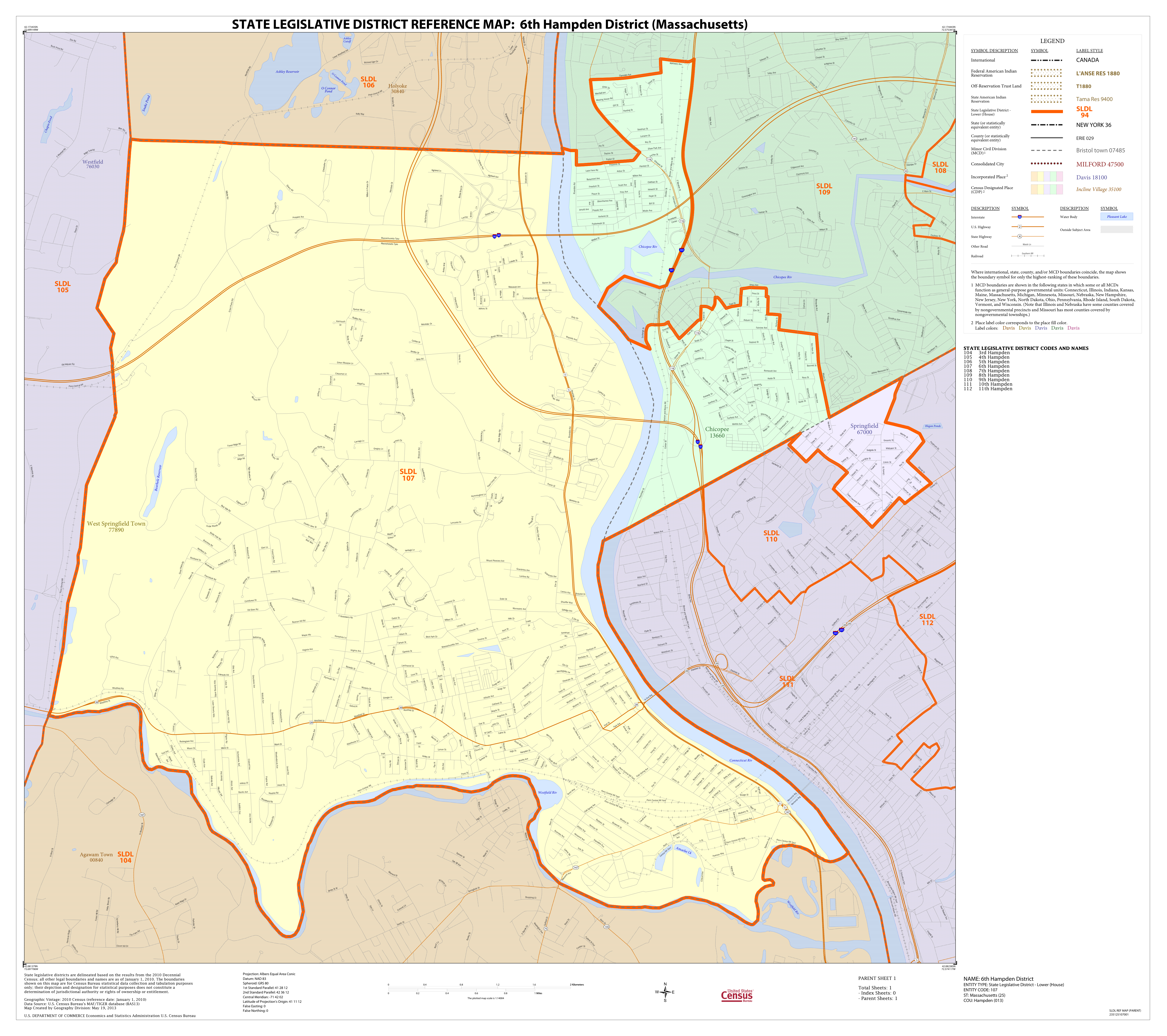
Map of Massachusetts House of Representatives' 6th Hampden district, based on the 2010 United States census.

Massachusetts House of Representatives' 6th Hampden district in the United States is one of 160 legislative districts included in the lower house of the Massachusetts General Court. It covers part of Hampden County. Democrat Michael Finn of West Springfield has represented the district since 2011.

== Towns represented ==
The district includes the following localities:

- part of Chicopee
- part of Springfield
- West Springfield

The current district geographic boundary overlaps with that of the Massachusetts Senate's Hampden district.

=== Former locales ===
The district previously covered:

- Holyoke, circa 1872
- Ludlow, circa 1872

== Representatives ==
- Hiram Q. Sanderson, circa 1858
- Otis A. Seamans, circa 1859
- William F. Ferry, circa 1888
- Ethan C. Robinson, circa 1888
- Arthur E. Marsh, circa 1920
- Emma E. Brigham 1928-1936
- Michael P. Pessolano, circa 1951
- Anthony M. Scibelli, circa 1951
- Garreth Lynch, circa 1975
- Walter A. DeFilippi, 1991-2001
- Stephen Buoniconti
- James T. Welch
- Michael J. Finn, 2011-current

== See also ==
- List of Massachusetts House of Representatives elections
- Other Hampden County districts of the Massachusetts House of Representatives: 1st, 2nd, 3rd, 4th, 5th, 7th, 8th, 9th, 10th, 11th, 12th
- Hampden County districts of the Massachusett Senate: Berkshire, Hampshire, Franklin, and Hampden; Hampden; 1st Hampden and Hampshire; 2nd Hampden and Hampshire
- List of Massachusetts General Courts
- List of former districts of the Massachusetts House of Representatives
