= Massachusetts House of Representatives' 4th Hampden district =

American legislative district

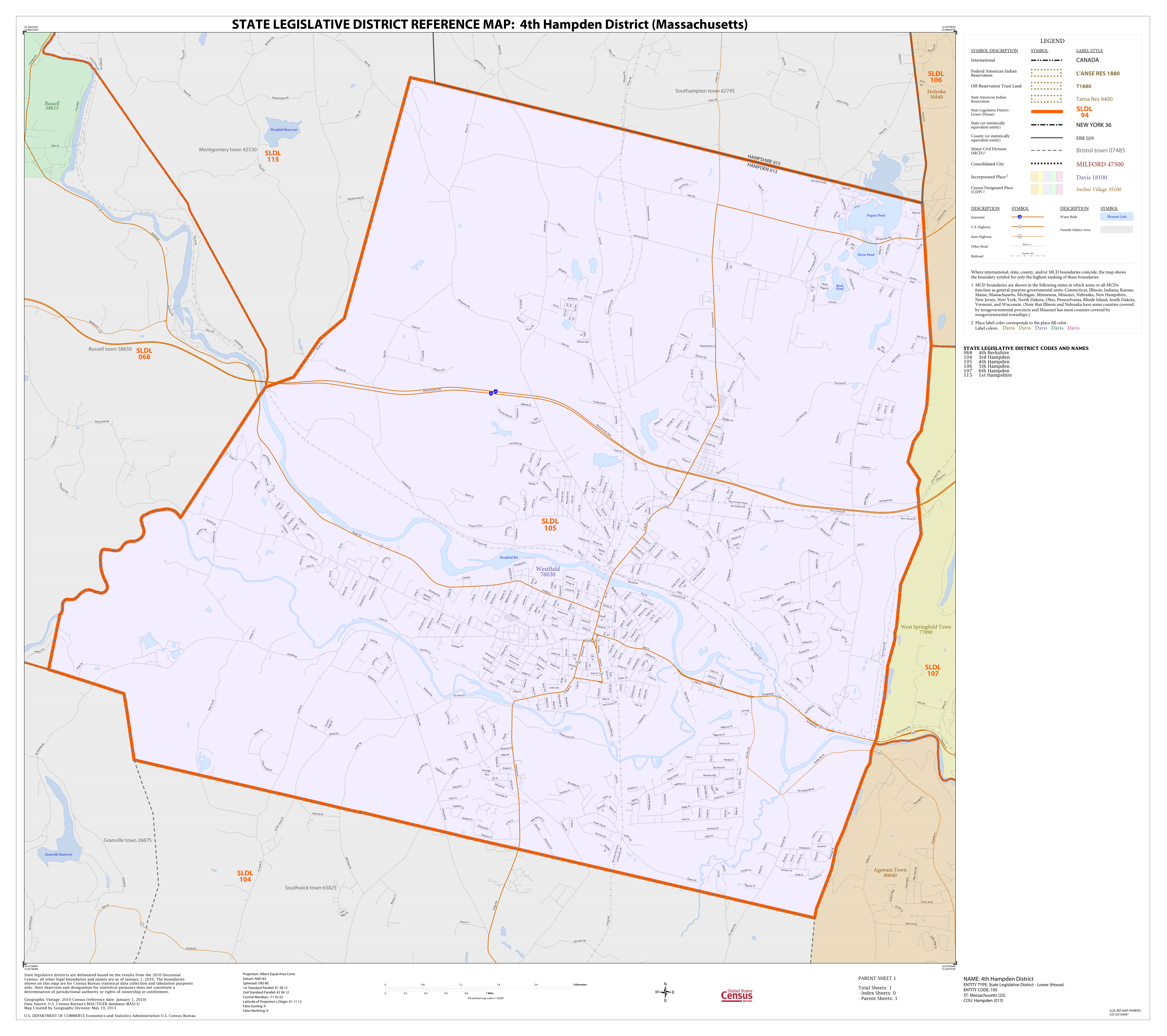
Map of Massachusetts House of Representatives' 4th Hampden district, based on the 2010 United States census.

Massachusetts House of Representatives' 4th Hampden district in the United States is one of 160 legislative districts included in the lower house of the Massachusetts General Court. It covers the city of Westfield in Hampden County. Democrat John Velis of Westfield represented the district from 2014 to 2020. Candidates for this district seat in the 2020 Massachusetts general election include Independent Conservative Dan Allie, Democrat Matt Garlo, and Republican Kelly Pease.

The current district geographic boundary overlaps with that of the Massachusetts Senate's 2nd Hampden and Hampshire district.

== Representatives ==
- Marvin Chapin, circa 1858
- Joseph Stone, circa 1859
- Jeremiah J. Keane, circa 1888
- Chauncey A. Bennett, circa 1920
- Julius F. Carman, circa 1920
- Frederick David Griggs, circa 1925-1928
- Walter Frank Szetela, circa 1951
- John F. Coffey, circa 1975
- Steven Pierce
- Michael Knapik
- Cele Hahn
- Donald Humason Jr.
- John Velis, April 16, 2014 – May 28, 2020
- Kelly Pease, 2021-

== Former locale ==
The district previously covered part of Springfield, circa 1872.

== See also ==
- List of Massachusetts House of Representatives elections
- Other Hampden County districts of the Massachusetts House of Representatives: 1st, 2nd, 3rd, 5th, 6th, 7th, 8th, 9th, 10th, 11th, 12th
- Hampden County districts of the Massachusett Senate: Berkshire, Hampshire, Franklin, and Hampden; Hampden; 1st Hampden and Hampshire; 2nd Hampden and Hampshire
- List of Massachusetts General Courts
- List of former districts of the Massachusetts House of Representatives

== Images ==
Portraits of legislators

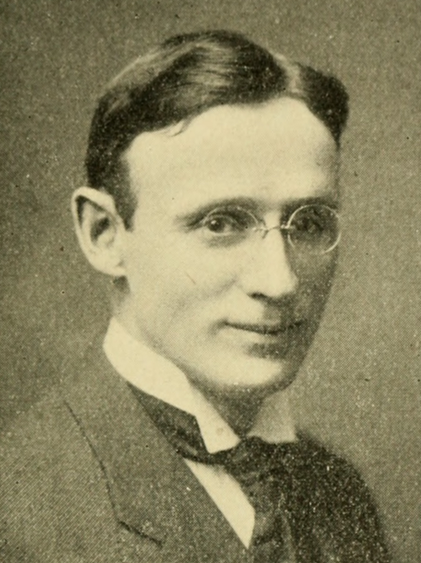
John Bennett

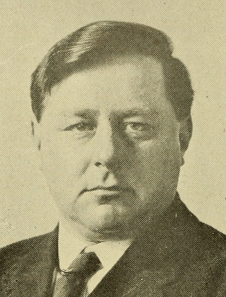
Chauncey Bennett

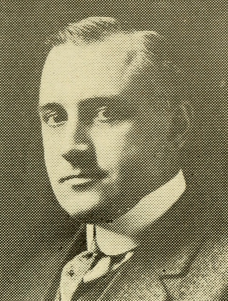
Giles Blague

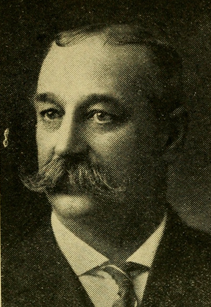
Julius Carman

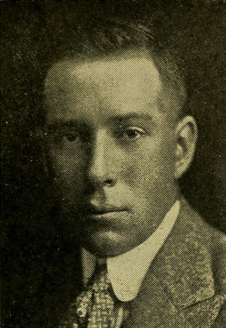
Merle Dixon Graves

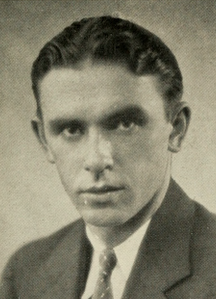
Edward Boland

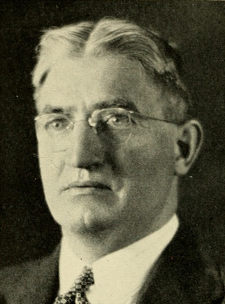
Eugene Sweeney

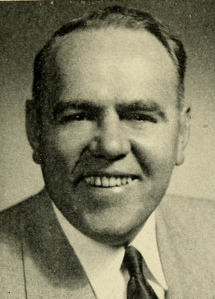
Joseph Wisniowski

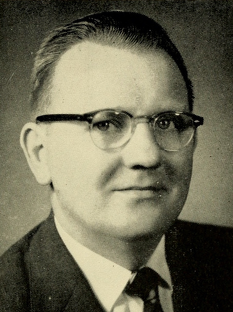
Mitsie Kulig

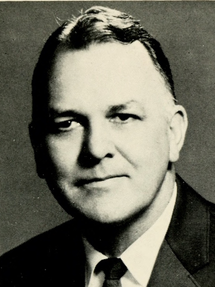
John Coffey

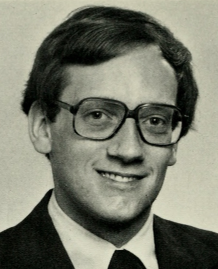
Steven Pierce

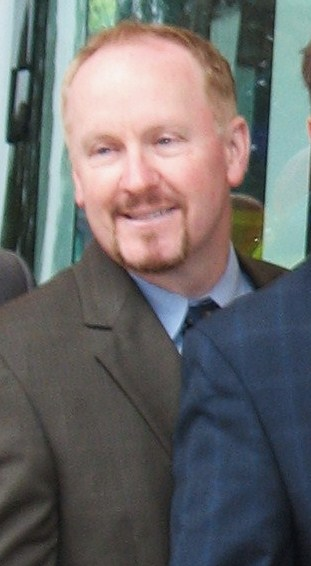
Michael Knapik

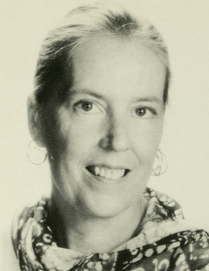
Cele Hahn

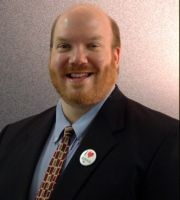
Donald Humason

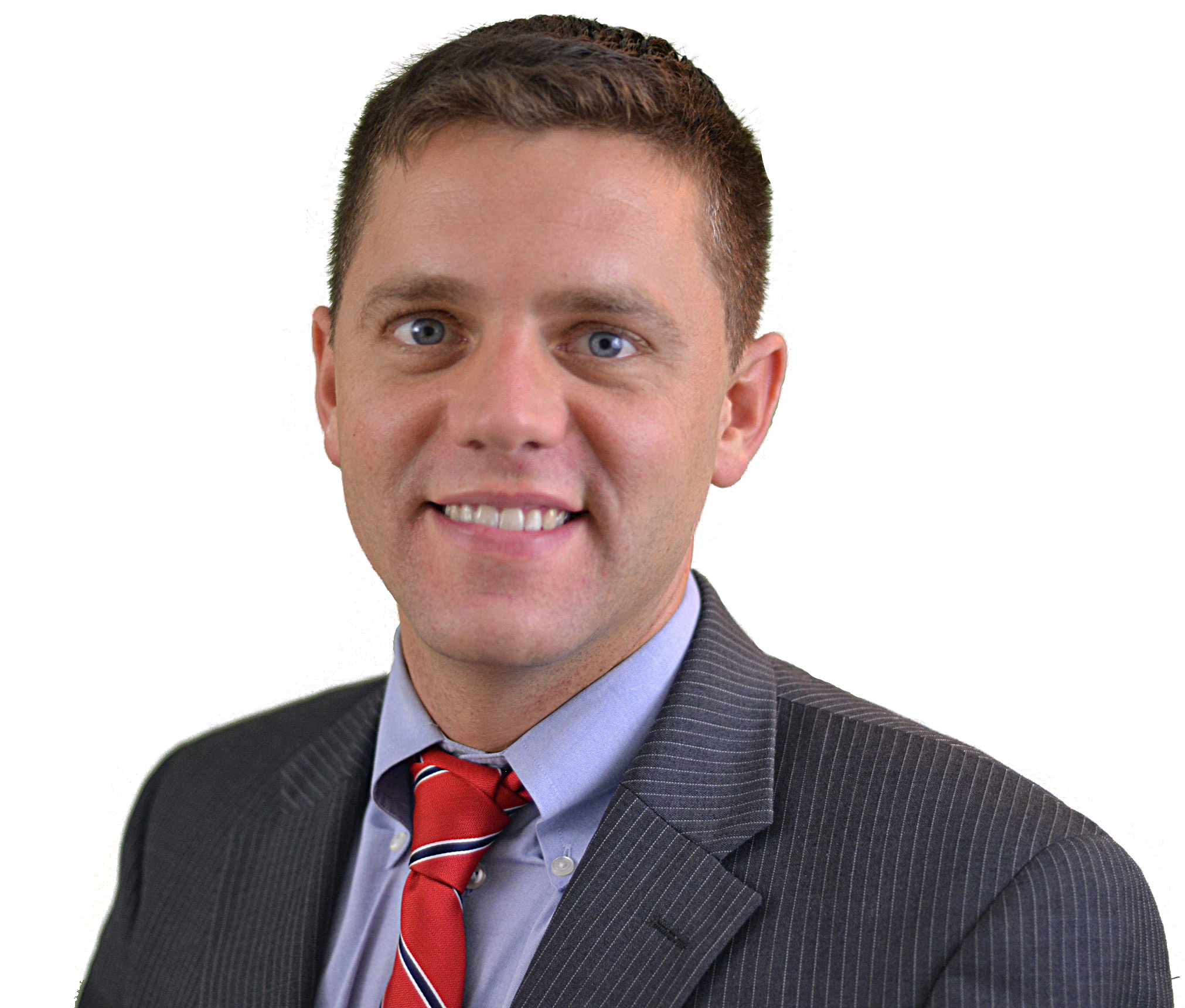
John Velis
