= Massachusetts House of Representatives' 2nd Hampden district =

American legislative district

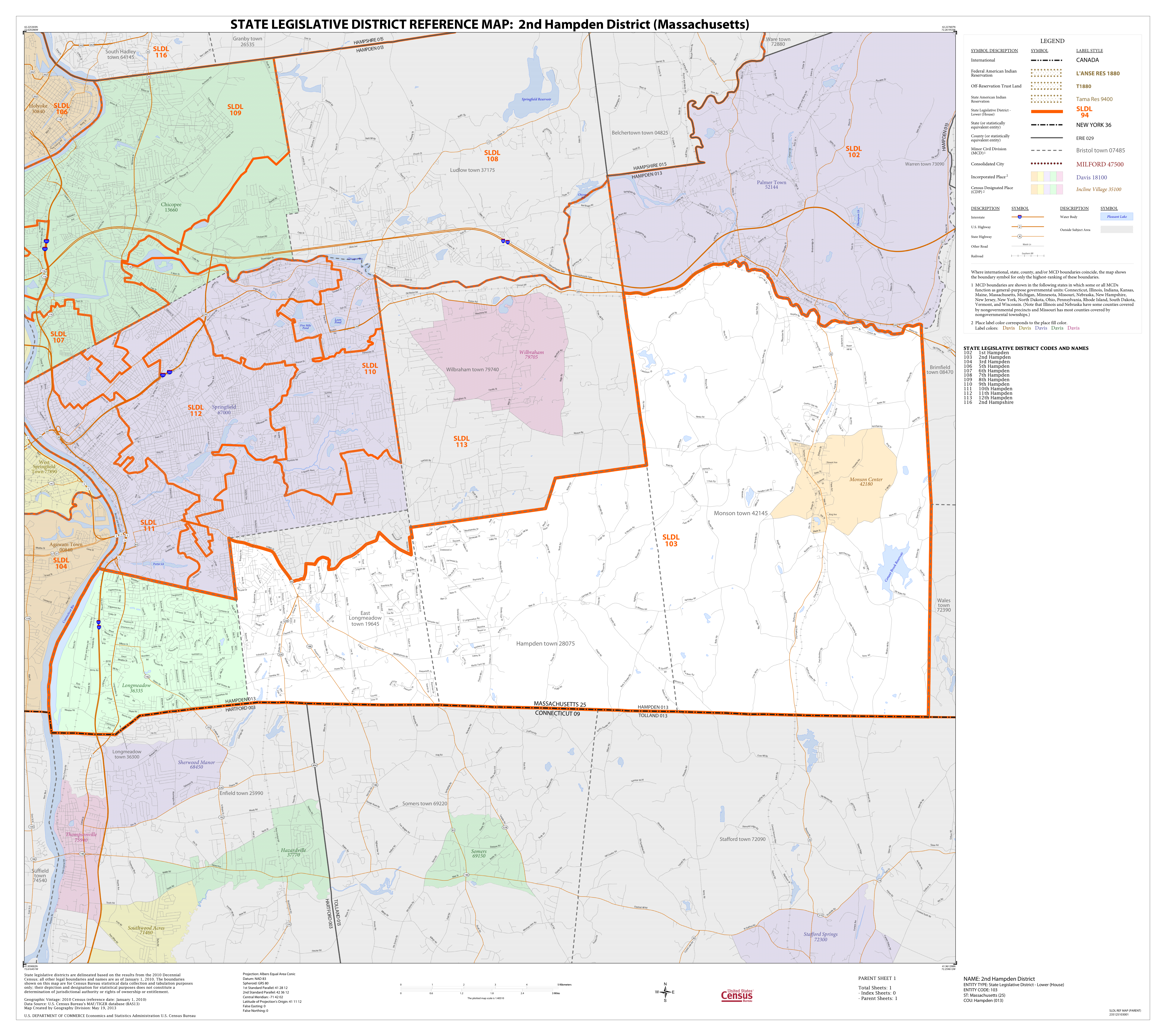
Map of Massachusetts House of Representatives' 2nd Hampden district, based on the 2010 United States census.

Massachusetts House of Representatives' 2nd Hampden district in the United States is one of 160 legislative districts included in the lower house of the Massachusetts General Court. It covers part of Hampden County. Democrat Brian Ashe of Longmeadow has represented the district since 2009.

== Towns represented ==
The district includes the following localities:

- part of East Longmeadow
- Hampden
- Longmeadow
- part of Monson
- part of Springfield

=== Former locales ===
The district previously covered:

- Palmer, circa 1872
- Wilbraham, circa 1872

== Representatives ==
- Solomon A. Fay, circa 1858
- Henry Scism, circa 1859
- William Provin, circa 1888
- Charles Fay Shepard, circa 1888
- Herbert L. Miller, circa 1920
- Frederick A. Warren, circa 1920
- John Forbes Thompson, circa 1951
- Iris K. Holland, circa 1975
- Mary Rogeness
- Brian M. Ashe, 2009-current

== See also ==
- List of Massachusetts House of Representatives elections
- Other Hampden County districts of the Massachusetts House of Representatives: 1st, 3rd, 4th, 5th, 6th, 7th, 8th, 9th, 10th, 11th, 12th
- Hampden County districts of the Massachusett Senate: Berkshire, Hampshire, Franklin, and Hampden; Hampden; 1st Hampden and Hampshire; 2nd Hampden and Hampshire
- List of Massachusetts General Courts
- List of former districts of the Massachusetts House of Representatives
