= Massachusetts House of Representatives' 8th Hampden district =

American legislative district

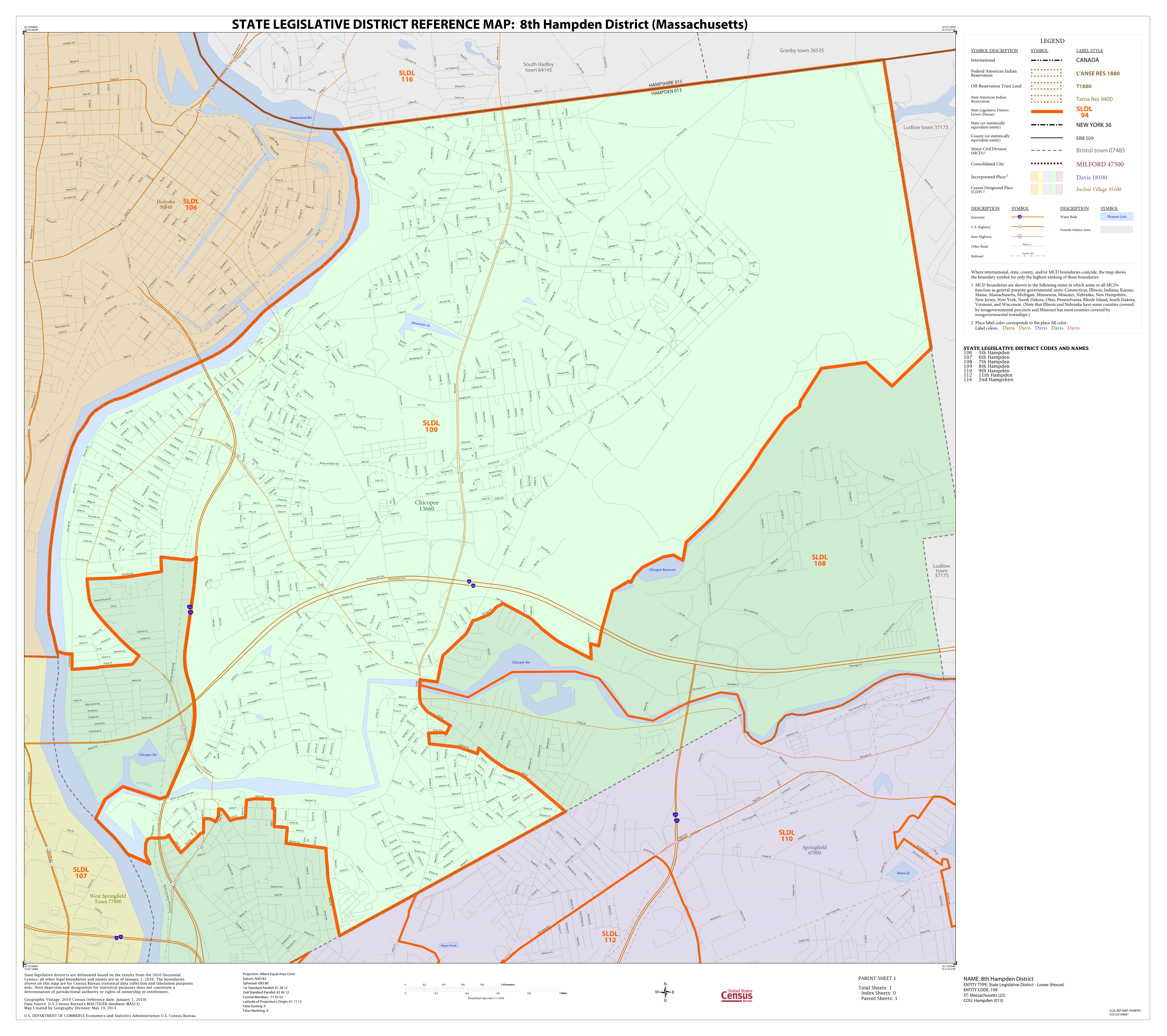
Map of Massachusetts House of Representatives' 8th Hampden district, based on the 2010 United States census.

Massachusetts House of Representatives' 8th Hampden district in the United States is one of 160 legislative districts included in the lower house of the Massachusetts General Court. It covers part of the city of Chicopee in Hampden County. Democrat Joseph Wagner of Chicopee represented the district until 1991. Upon his retirement, Democrat Shirley Arriaga has taken over as Representative.

The district geographic boundary overlaps with those of the Massachusetts Senate's 1st Hampden and Hampshire district, 2nd Hampden and Hampshire district, and Hampden district.

== Representatives ==
- Elbridge G. Pierce, circa 1858
- George L. Wright, circa 1859
- Charles Henry Bennett, circa 1888
- Charles Amos Call, circa 1888
- Leo P. Senecal (Republican), 1920-1925
- Daniel J. Coakley (Democrat), 1925-1927
- Julius F. Carman (Republican), 1927-1929
- Richard H. Stacy (Republican), 1929-1941
- Archie Edward Bruce (Republican), 1941-49
- Philip Kimball (Republican), 1949-1969
- John P. O'Brien (Democrat), 1969-1973
- Peter H. Lappin (Democrat), 1973-1975
- James E. O'Leary (Democrat), 1975
- Robert J. Rohan (Democrat), 1976–79
- Richard H. Demers (Democrat), 1979-1981
- Kenneth M. Lemanski (Democrat), 1981-1991 (1982-84 as Republican, 1984-91 as Democrat)
- Joseph Wagner (Democrat), 1991-2023
- Shirley Arriaga (Democrat), 2023-Current

== Former locale ==
The district previously covered Westfield, circa 1872.

== See also ==
- List of Massachusetts House of Representatives elections
- Other Hampden County districts of the Massachusetts House of Representatives: 1st, 2nd, 3rd, 4th, 5th, 6th, 7th, 9th, 10th, 11th, 12th
- Hampden County districts of the Massachusett Senate: Berkshire, Hampshire, Franklin, and Hampden; Hampden; 1st Hampden and Hampshire; 2nd Hampden and Hampshire
- List of Massachusetts General Courts
- List of former districts of the Massachusetts House of Representatives

== Images ==
Portraits of legislators

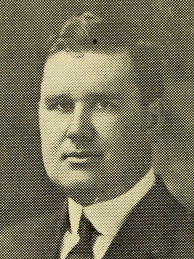
John O'Connor

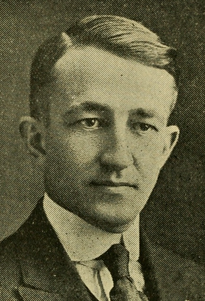
Leo Senecal

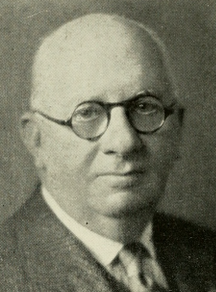
Richard Stacy

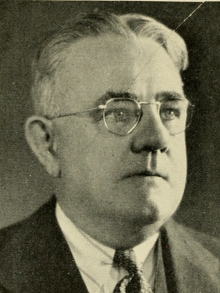
Archie Bruce

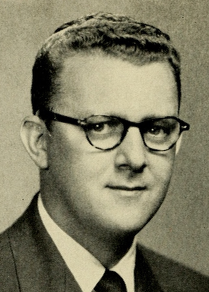
Philip Kimball

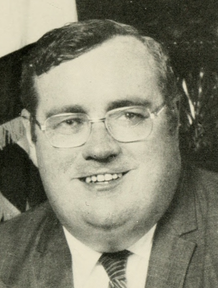
James O'Leary

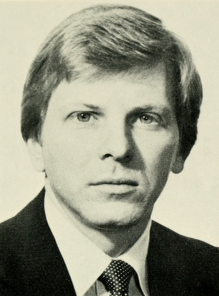
Kenneth Lemanski

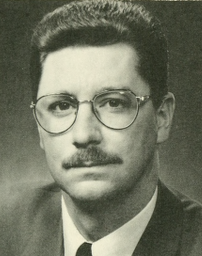
Joseph Wagner
