= Velits =

Velits is a surname. Notable people with the surname include:

- Martin Velits (born 1985), Slovak cyclist
- Peter Velits (born 1985), Slovak cyclist

== See also ==
- Velis
