= Massachusetts Senate's 2nd Hampden and Hampshire district =

American legislative district

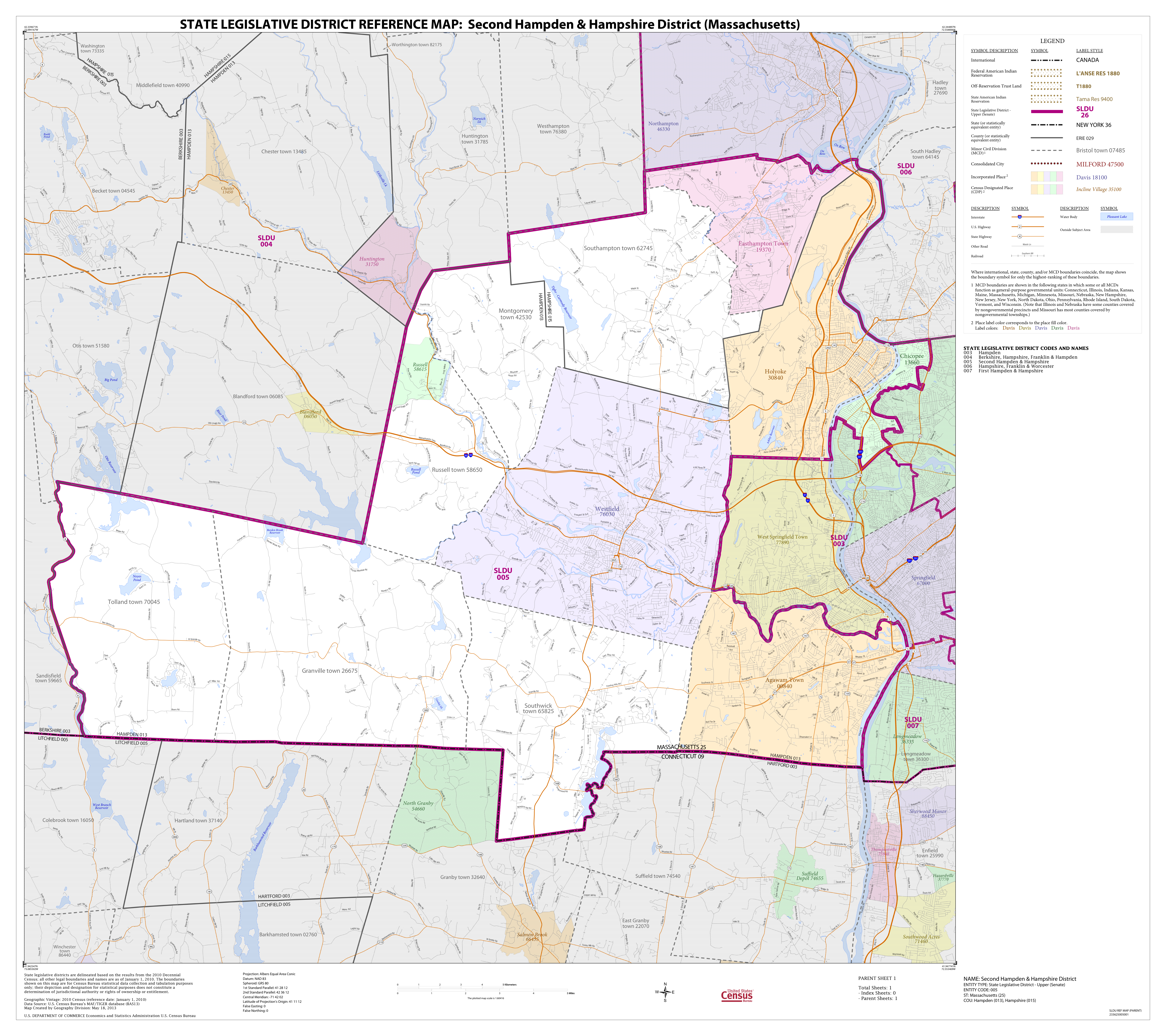
Map of Massachusetts Senate's 2nd Hampden and Hampshire district, based on the 2010 United States census.

Massachusetts Senate's 2nd Hampden and Hampshire district in the United States is one of 40 legislative districts of the Massachusetts Senate. It covers 29.3% of Hampden County and 13.8% of Hampshire County population in 2010. Democrat John Velis has represented the district since May 2020.

== Towns represented ==
The district includes the following localities:

- Agawam
- part of Chicopee
- Easthampton
- Granville
- Holyoke
- Montgomery
- Russell
- Southampton
- Southwick
- Tolland
- Westfield

The current district geographic boundary overlaps with those of the Massachusetts House of Representatives' 4th Berkshire, 3rd Hampden, 4th Hampden, 5th Hampden, 8th Hampden, 1st Hampshire, and 2nd Hampshire districts.

== Senators ==
- Alan D. Sisitsky
- Linda Melconian, circa 1985
- Michael R. Knapik, circa 2002
- Donald F. Humason, Jr., November 20, 2013 – January 5, 2020
- John Velis, May 28, 2020 – present

== Images ==
Portraits of legislators

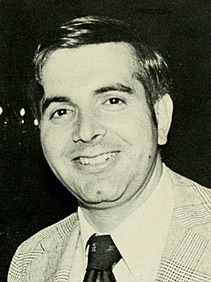
Alan Sisitsky

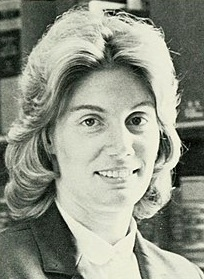
Linda Melconian

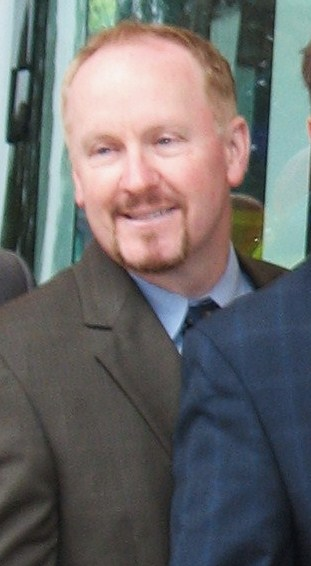
Michael Knapik

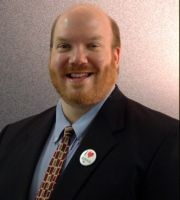
Donald Humason

== See also ==
- List of Massachusetts Senate elections
- Other Hampden County districts of the Massachusett Senate: Berkshire, Hampshire, Franklin, and Hampden; Hampden; 1st Hampden and Hampshire
- Other Hampshire County districts of the Massachusett Senate: Berkshire, Hampshire, Franklin, and Hampden; 1st Hampden and Hampshire; Hampshire, Franklin and Worcester
- Hampden County districts of the Massachusetts House of Representatives: 1st, 2nd, 3rd, 4th, 5th, 6th, 7th, 8th, 9th, 10th, 11th, 12th
- Hampshire County districts of the Massachusetts House of Representatives: 1st, 2nd, 3rd
- List of Massachusetts General Courts
- List of former districts of the Massachusetts Senate
