= Massachusetts House of Representatives' 11th Hampden district =

American legislative district

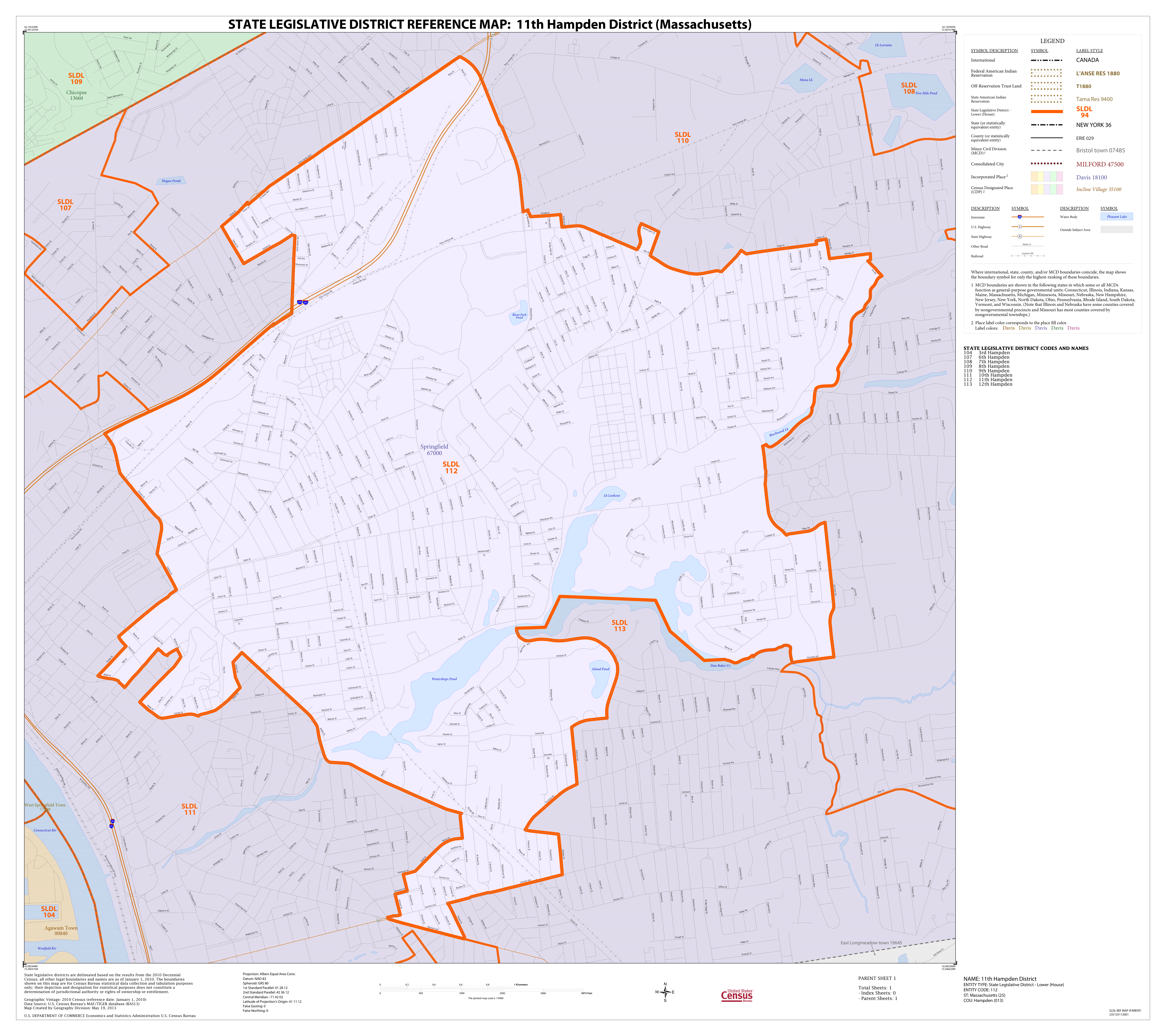
Map of Massachusetts House of Representatives' 11th Hampden district, based on the 2010 United States census.

Massachusetts House of Representatives' 11th Hampden district in the United States is one of 160 legislative districts included in the lower house of the Massachusetts General Court. It covers part of the city of Springfield in Hampden County. Democrat Bud Williams of Springfield has represented the district since 2017. Candidates running for this district seat in the 2020 Massachusetts general election include Republican Prince Golphin Jr.

The current district geographic boundary overlaps with those of the Massachusetts Senate's 1st Hampden and Hampshire district and Hampden district.

== Representatives ==
- Charles W. Knox, circa 1858
- David Cannon, circa 1859
- James F. Sweeney, circa 1920
- William A. Cowing, circa 1951
- George William Porter, circa 1951
- Sean Cahillane, circa 1975
- Benjamin Swan
- Bud L. Williams, 2017–present

== See also ==
- List of Massachusetts House of Representatives elections
- Other Hampden County districts of the Massachusetts House of Representatives: 1st, 2nd, 3rd, 4th, 5th, 6th, 7th, 8th, 9th, 10th, 12th
- Hampden County districts of the Massachusett Senate: Berkshire, Hampshire, Franklin, and Hampden; Hampden; 1st Hampden and Hampshire; 2nd Hampden and Hampshire
- List of Massachusetts General Courts
- List of former districts of the Massachusetts House of Representatives

== Images ==
Portraits of legislators

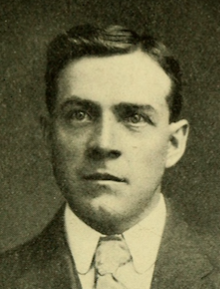
Jens Madsen

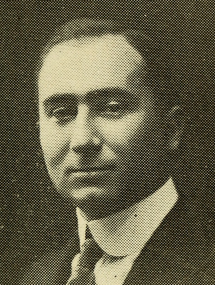
Michael Slotnick

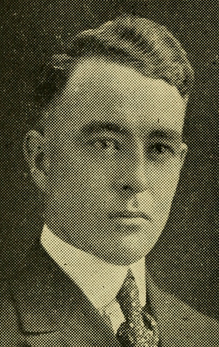
James Sweeney

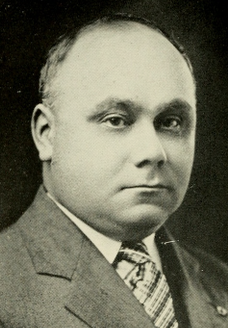
Joseph Harnisch

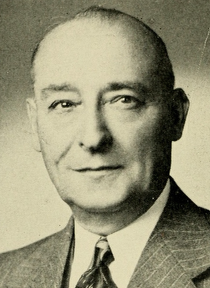
Ernest DeRoy

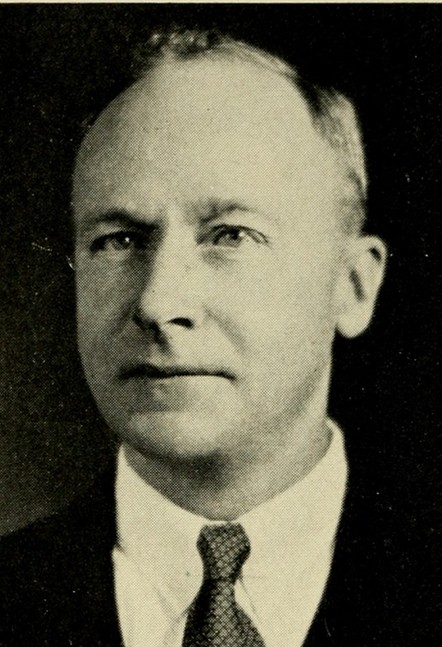
George William Porter

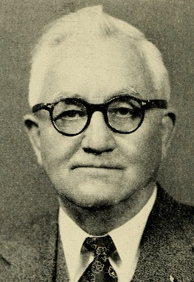
William Cowing

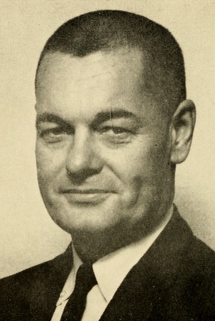
Walter Kerr

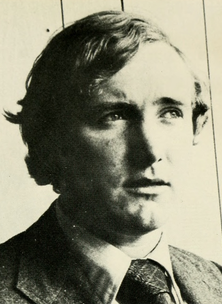
Sean Cahillane

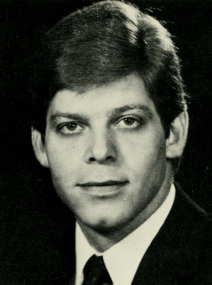
Paul Caron

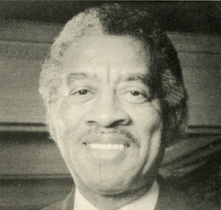
Benjamin Swan
