= Massachusetts House of Representatives' 7th Hampden district =

American legislative district

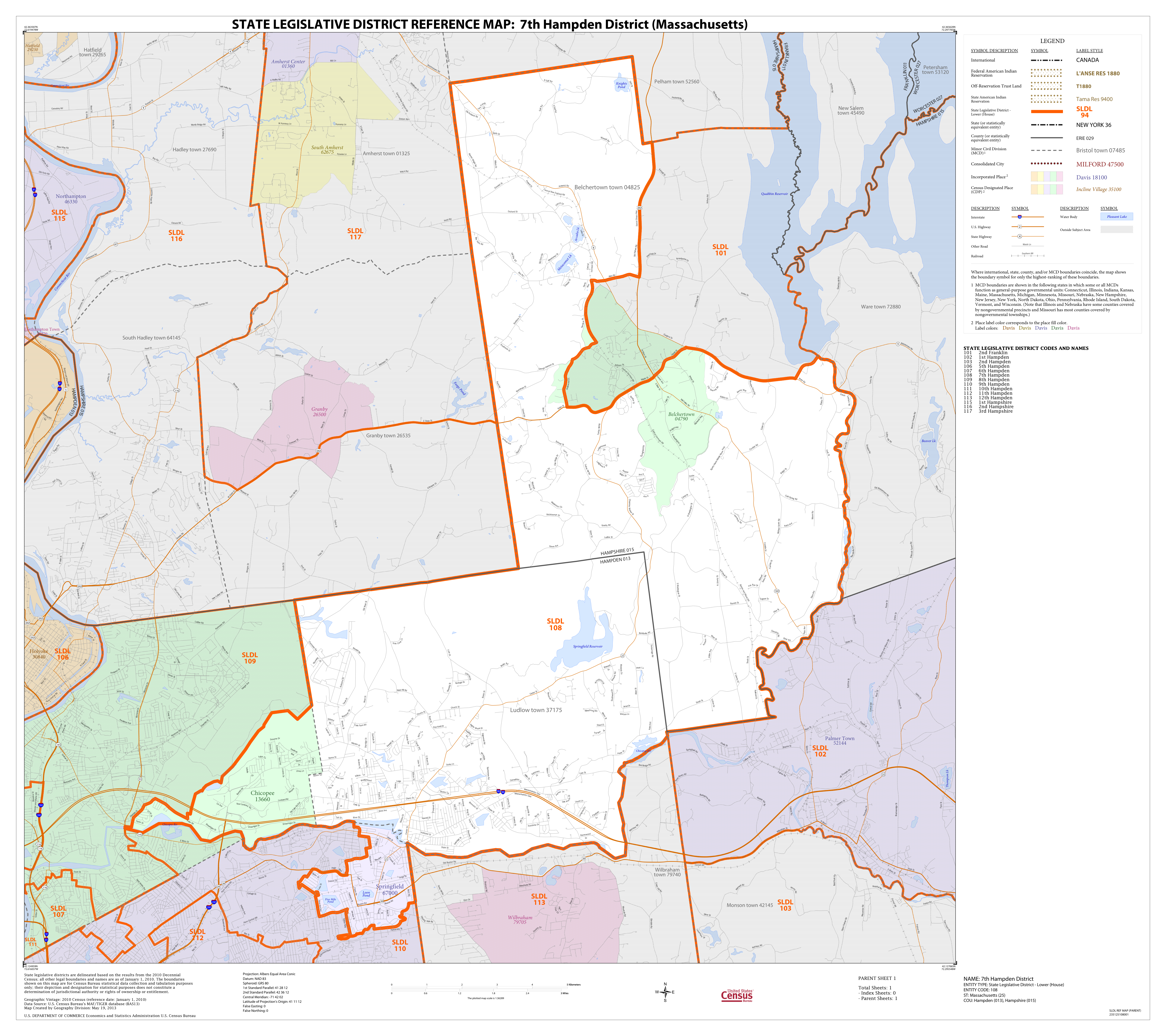
Map of Massachusetts House of Representatives' 7th Hampden district, based on the 2010 United States census.

Massachusetts House of Representatives' 7th Hampden district in the United States is one of 160 legislative districts included in the lower house of the Massachusetts General Court. It covers parts of Hampden County and Hampshire County. Democrat Aaron Saunders of Belchertown has represented the district since 2023.

== Towns represented ==
The district includes the following localities:

- part of Belchertown
- part of Chicopee
- Ludlow
- part of Springfield

The current district geographic boundary overlaps with those of the Massachusetts Senate's 1st Hampden and Hampshire district and Hampden district.

=== Former locales ===
The district previously covered:

- Agawam, circa 1872
- Granville, circa 1872
- Longmeadow, circa 1872
- Southwick, circa 1872
- West Springfield, circa 1872

== Representatives ==
- George H. Chapman, circa 1858
- James Renney, circa 1858
- George M. Stearns, circa 1859
- Albert Fuller, circa 1859
- A. Olin Brooks, circa 1888
- Samuel F. Brown, circa 1920
- Thomas T. Gray, circa 1951
- David Michael Hartley, circa 1975
- William D. Mullins, 1977–1986
- Thomas Petrolati, 1987-2021
- Jacob R. Oliveira, 2021-Current

== See also ==
- List of Massachusetts House of Representatives elections
- Other Hampden County districts of the Massachusetts House of Representatives: 1st, 2nd, 3rd, 4th, 5th, 6th, 8th, 9th, 10th, 11th, 12th
- Hampden County districts of the Massachusett Senate: Berkshire, Hampshire, Franklin, and Hampden; Hampden; 1st Hampden and Hampshire; 2nd Hampden and Hampshire
- List of Massachusetts General Courts
- List of former districts of the Massachusetts House of Representatives

== Images ==
Portraits of legislators

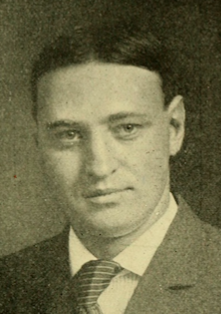
Frank Hodskins

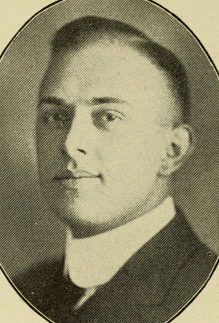
Bion Wheeler

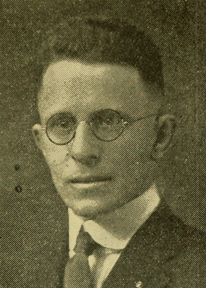
Chester Arthur Pike

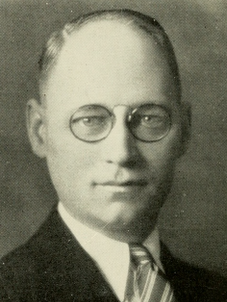
Tycho Peterson

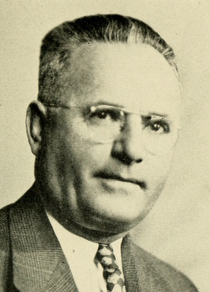
Thomas Gray

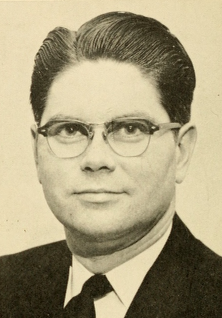
Frederick Whitney

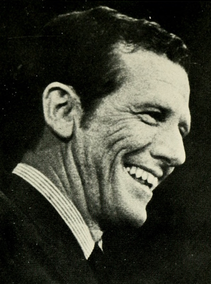
David Bartley

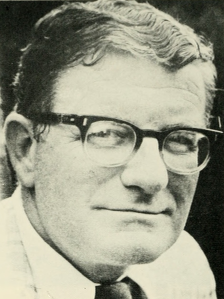
William Mullins

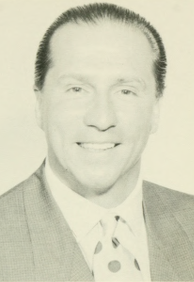
Thomas Petrolati

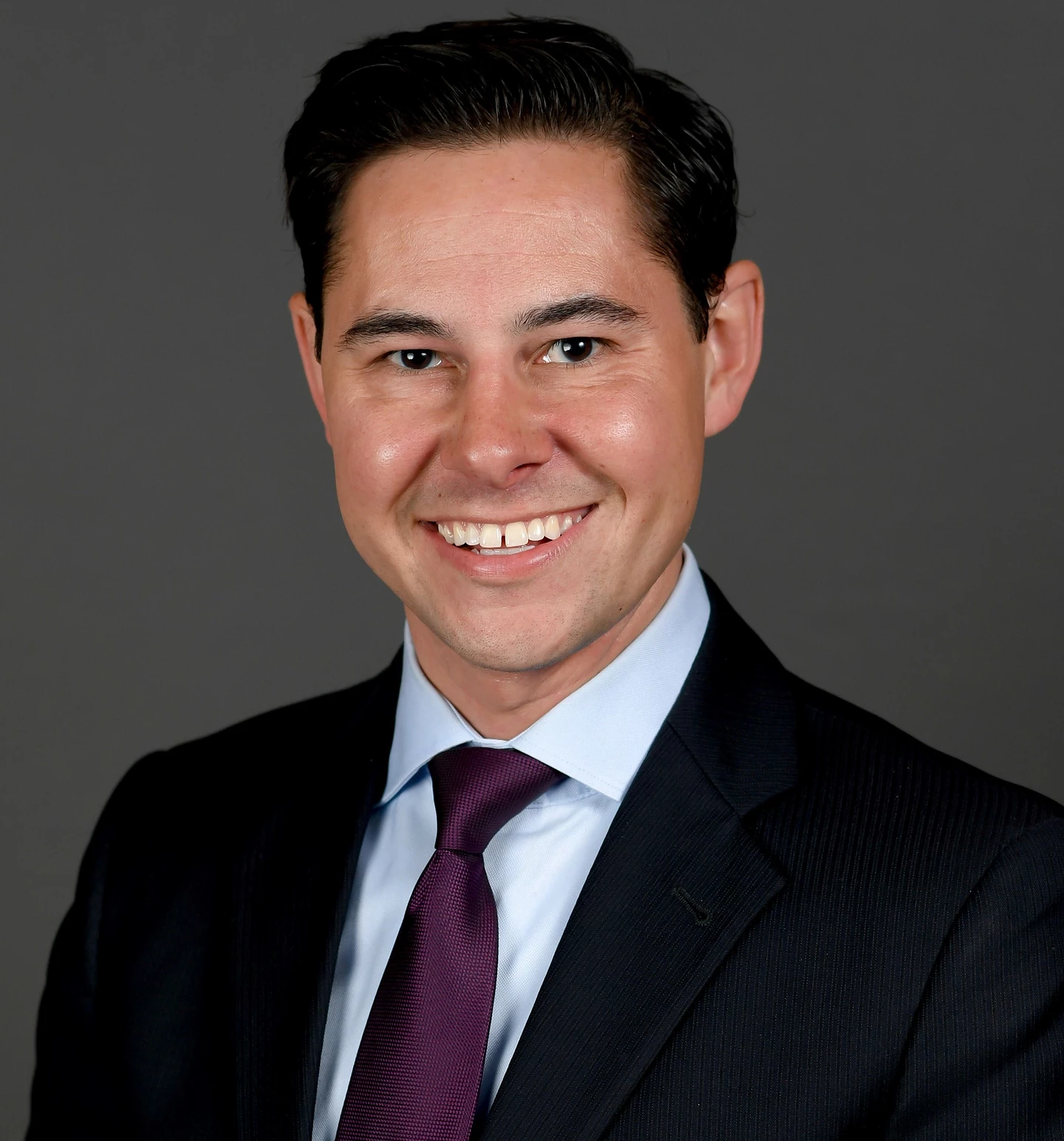
Jacob Oliveira
