= Massachusetts Senate's 1st Hampden and Hampshire district =

American legislative district

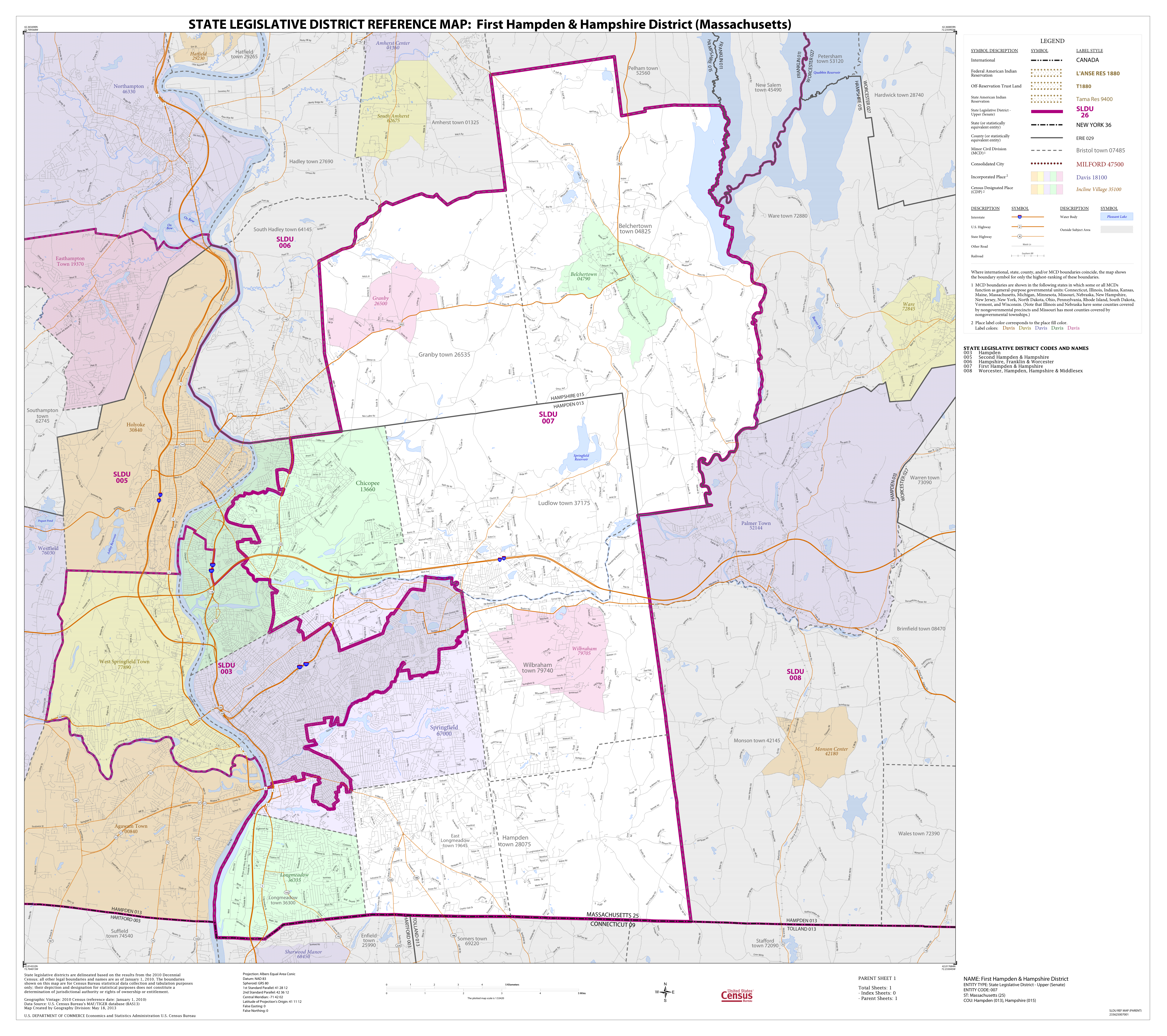
Map of Massachusetts Senate's 1st Hampden and Hampshire district, based on the 2010 United States census.

Massachusetts Senate's 1st Hampden & Hampshire District in the United States was one of 40 legislative districts of the Massachusetts Senate. Due to redistricting from the 2020 census, this district was eliminated and redrawn into the newly formed Hampden, Hampshire and Worcester district.

== Locales represented ==
The district includes the following localities:

- Belchertown
- part of Chicopee
- East Longmeadow
- Granby
- Hampden
- Longmeadow
- Ludlow
- part of Springfield
- Wilbraham

The current district geographic boundary overlaps with those of the Massachusetts House of Representatives' 2nd Hampden, 7th Hampden, 8th Hampden, 9th Hampden, 10th Hampden, 11th Hampden, 12th Hampden, 2nd Hampshire, and 3rd Hampshire districts.

== Senators ==
- John P. Burke, circa 1979-1985
- Brian Lees, 1989-2007
- Gale D. Candaras, 2007-2015
- Eric Lesser, 2015–2023

== Images ==
Portraits of legislators

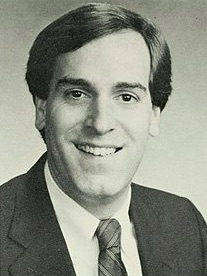
Brian Lees

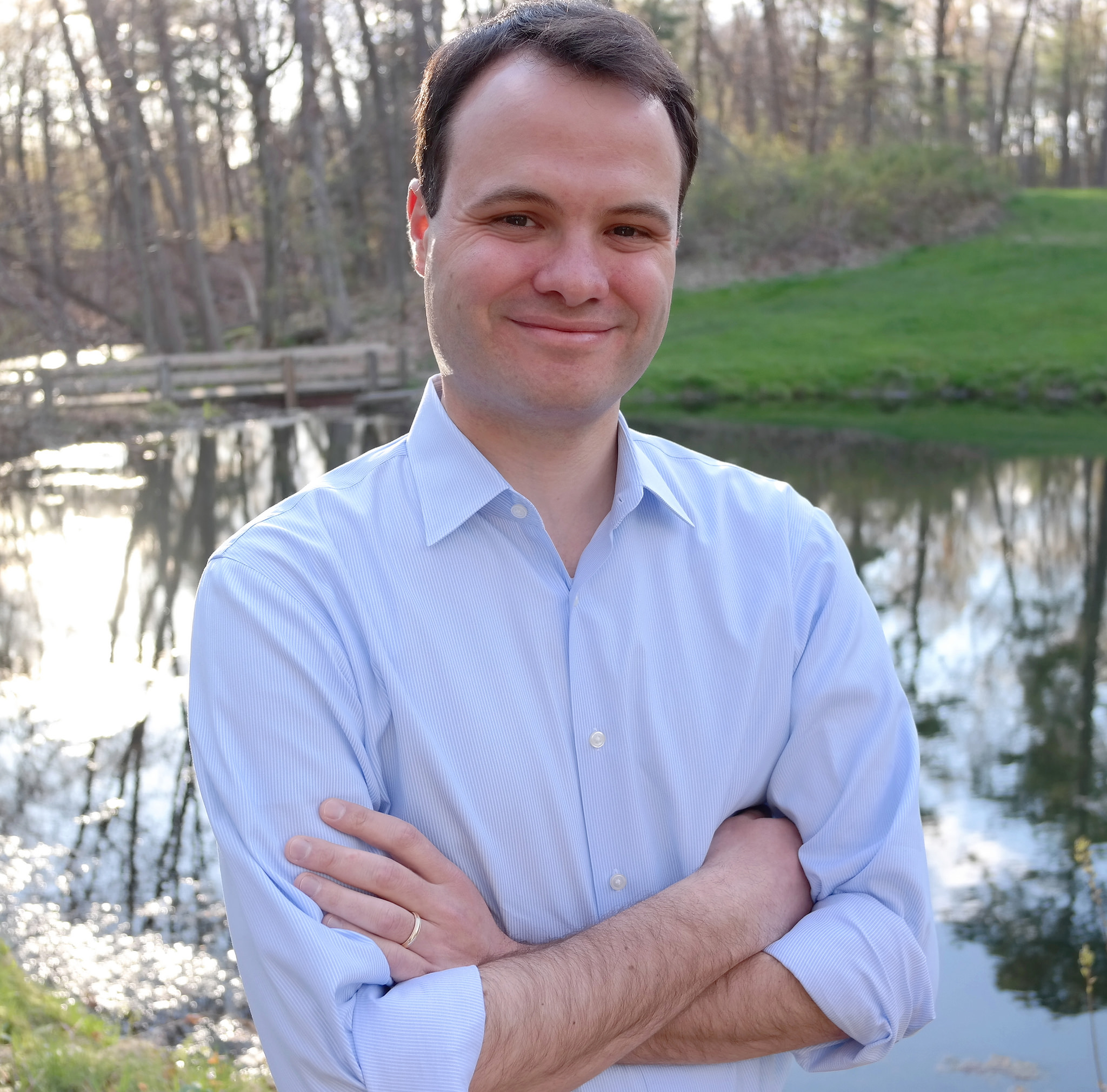
Eric Lesser

== See also ==
- List of Massachusetts Senate elections
- Other Hampden County districts of the Massachusett Senate: Berkshire, Hampshire, Franklin, and Hampden; Hampden; 2nd Hampden and Hampshire
- Other Hampshire County districts of the Massachusett Senate: Berkshire, Hampshire, Franklin, and Hampden; 2nd Hampden and Hampshire; Hampshire, Franklin and Worcester
- Hampden County districts of the Massachusetts House of Representatives: 1st, 2nd, 3rd, 4th, 5th, 6th, 7th, 8th, 9th, 10th, 11th, 12th
- Hampshire County districts of the Massachusetts House of Representatives: 1st, 2nd, 3rd
- List of Massachusetts General Courts
- List of former districts of the Massachusetts Senate
