= Massachusetts Senate's Hampden, Hampshire, and Worcester district =

American legislative district

Massachusetts Senate's Hampden, Hampshire, and Worcester district in the United States is one of 40 legislative districts of the Massachusetts Senate. This district was created due to redistricting after the 2020 census. This district consists mostly of the old 1st Hampden and Hampshire district and additional towns from the represented counties. Jacob Oliveira of Ludlow has represented this district since 2023.

== Locales represented ==
The district includes the following localities:

- Belchertown
- part of Chicopee
- East Longmeadow
- Granby
- Hampden
- Longmeadow
- Ludlow
- Palmer
- South Hadley
- part of Springfield
- Warren
- Wilbraham

== Recent Elections ==
State Election 2024: State Senate Hampden, Hampshire, and Worcester District
| Party | Candidate | Votes | % | ±% |
|---|---|---|---|---|
| Democratic | Jacob Oliveira | 68,420 | 98.0 | |
| | All Others | 1,380 | 2 | |
| | Blanks | 25,855 | | |
| Majority | | | | |
| Turnout | | 95,655 | | |
| Democratic hold | | Swing | | |

State Election 2022: State Senate Hampden, Hampshire, and Worcester District
| Party | Candidate | Votes | % | ±% |
|---|---|---|---|---|
| Democratic | Jacob Oliveira | 37,410 | 56.3 | |
| Republican | William Johnson | 29,027 | 43.7 | |
| | All Others | 31 | 0 | |
| Majority | | 8,383 | | |
| Turnout | | 68,149 | | |
| Democratic hold | | Swing | | |
