= Donald Humason Jr. =

American politician

Don Humason
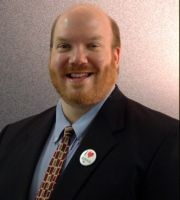

Town Administrator of Chester
- Incumbent
- Assumed office September 6, 2022
- Preceded by: Jill Strong

Mayor of Westfield
- In office January 6, 2020 – January 3, 2022
- Preceded by: Brian P. Sullivan
- Succeeded by: Michael A. McCabe

Member of the Massachusetts Senate from the 2nd Hampden and Hampshire district
- In office November 20, 2013 – January 5, 2020
- Preceded by: Michael Knapik
- Succeeded by: John Velis

Member of the Massachusetts House of Representatives from the 4th Hampden district
- In office 2003 – November 20, 2013
- Preceded by: Cele Hahn
- Succeeded by: John Velis

Personal details
- Born: July 31, 1967 (age 59) Westfield, Massachusetts
- Party: Republican
- Spouse: Janice Humason (m. 2006)
- Children: Quinn (b. 2011)
- Education: Westfield State College (B.S.)
- Occupation: Politician
- Website: Massachusetts Legislature website Campaign website

Donald F. Humason Jr. (born July 31, 1967) is an American politician who served as mayor of Westfield, Massachusetts from 2020 to 2022 and current town administrator of Chester, beginning September 6, 2022. A member of the Republican Party, he previously represented the 2nd Hampden and Hampshire District in the Massachusetts Senate from 2013 to 2020, and as representative for the 4th Hampden District in the Massachusetts House of Representatives between 2003 and 2013.

== Political career ==
=== Massachusetts House of Representatives ===
In his first bid for public office, Humason was elected on November 5, 2002 with 63% of the vote and was re-elected in 2004, 2006, 2008, 2010, and 2012. He resigned on November 20, 2013 after he was elected to the State Senate.

Humason's committee assignments were as follows.

186th General Court (2009–2011)

- Joint Committee on Consumer Protection and Professional Licensure
- Joint Committee on Higher Education
- Joint Committee on Public Health
- Joint Committee on Transportation
- Joint Committee on Economic Development and Emerging Technologies

187th General Court (2011–2013)

- Joint Committee on Consumer Protection and Professional Licensure
- Joint Committee on Rules
- Committee on Rules

188th General Court (2013–2015)

- Joint Committee on Consumer Protection and Professional Licensure
- Joint Committee on Economic Development and Emerging Technologies

189th General Court (2015–2017)

- Joint Committee on Children, Families and Persons with Disabilities
- Joint Committee on Public Service
- Joint Committee on Veterans and Federal Affairs
- Joint Committee on Ways and Means
- Committee on Intergovernmental Affairs
- Committee on Bonding, Capital Expenditures and State Assets
- Committee on Ways and Means
- Special Committee to Improve Government

=== Massachusetts Senate ===
On August 9, 2013, incumbent State Senator Michael Knapik resigned to become Executive Director of Advancement at Westfield State University. Humason defeated Michael Franco in the Republican primary on October 8 and defeated Democratic opponent David K. Bartley 53%-47%. A few weeks later, Humason was named as the new Senate Minority Whip by Senate Minority Leader Bruce Tarr. As Minority Whip, Humason worked to coordinate votes within the Senate Republican Caucus and assist the Minority Leader in developing policy. He submitted his letter of resignation to Massachusetts Senate President Karen Spilka on December 4 upon being elected Mayor of Westfield. A special election was scheduled for March 31, 2020, but was delayed by the COVID-19 pandemic until May 16; it was won by Representative John Velis, who previously won the 2014 special election to succeed Humason in the House.

During his tenure in the Senate, Humason's committee assignments were as follows:

188th General Court (2013–2014)

- Joint Committee on Children, Families and Persons with Disabilities
- Joint Committee on Consumer Protection and Professional Licensure
- Joint Committee on Public Health
- Joint Committee on Public Service
- Joint Committee on Revenue
- Joint Committee on Telecommunications, Utilities and Energy
- Joint Committee on Veterans and Federal Affairs
- Joint Committee on Ways and Means
- Committee on Ways and Means
- Committee on Bonding, Capital Expenditures and State Assets

189th General Court (2015–2016)

- Joint Committee on Children, Families and Persons with Disabilities
- Joint Committee on Education
- Joint Committee on Public Service
- Joint Committee on Veterans and Federal Affairs
- Committee on Intergovernmental Affairs
- Committee on Bonding, Capital Expenditures and State Assets
- Committee on Ways and Means

190th General Court (2017–2018)

- Joint Committee on Rules
- Joint Committee on Children, Families and Persons with Disabilities
- Joint Committee on Public Service
- Joint Committee on Transportation
- Joint Committee on Veterans and Federal Affairs
- Joint Committee on Ways and Means
- Special Committee to Review the Sexual Harassment Policies and Procedures
- Committee on Bonding, Capital Expenditures and State Assets
- Committee on Intergovernmental Affairs
- Committee on Rules
- Committee on Ways and Means

191st General Court (2019–2020)

- Joint Committee on Children, Families and Persons with Disabilities
- Joint Committee on Public Health
- Joint Committee on Public Service
- Joint Committee on Veterans and Federal Affairs
- Joint Committee on Ways and Means
- Committee on Bonding, Capital Expenditures and State Assets (Ranking Member)
- Committee on Ethics (Ranking Member)
- Committee on Post Audit and Oversight
- Committee on Ways and Means

==== Towns represented ====
In Hampden County: Chicopee (Ward 7 - Precinct A and B, Ward 8 - Precinct A, Ward 9 - Precinct A), Holyoke, Westfield, Agawam, Granville, Montgomery, Russell, Southwick and Tolland.
In Hampshire County: Easthampton and Southampton.

==== Appointments ====
- Senate Minority Whip (2013–2017)
- Military Asset and Security Strategy Task Force
- Senate Assistant Minority Leader (2017–2020)

=== Mayor of Westfield ===
In January 2019, two-term incumbent Mayor Brian P. Sullivan announced he would not seek re-election. On March 21, Humason ran for mayor against Michael McCabe, a 34-year captain of the Westfield Police Department. Humason narrowly defeated McCabe in a close race, winning 4,983 votes while McCabe received 4,886. Neither side declared victory as the results were within the margin of error, but McCabe chose not to seek a recount and conceded. He ran for re-election to a second term in 2021, but lost to McCabe in a rematch.

=== Town administrator of Chester ===
After his tenure as Mayor of Westfield ended, Humason was chosen by the Chester selectboard to be the next town administrator.

== Electoral history ==
State Legislature

Election results
Year	Office	Election	Subject	Party	Votes	%	Opponent	Party	Votes	%
2002	State Representative	General	Donald F. Humason Jr.	Republican	8,250	63.0%	Bo Sullivan	Democratic	4.827	36.9%
2004	State Representative	General	Donald F. Humason Jr.	Republican	13,720	99.1%				
2006	State Representative	General	Donald F. Humason Jr.	Republican	9,925	98.9%				
2008	State Representative	General	Donald F. Humason Jr.	Republican	11,521	69.3%	Brian R. Hoose	Democratic	5,080	30.6%
2010	State Representative	General	Donald F. Humason Jr.	Republican	10,286	99.3%				
2012	State Representative	General	Donald F. Humason Jr.	Republican	14,732	99.2%				
2013	State Senator	Special	Donald F. Humason Jr.	Republican	18,182	52.6%	David K. Bartley	Democratic	16,314	47.4%
2014	State Senator	General	Donald F. Humason Jr.	Republican	27,817	54.3%	Patrick T. Leahy	Democratic	16,314	47.4%
2016	State Senator	General	Donald F. Humason Jr.	Republican	43,097	59.5%	J.D. Parker-O'Grady	Democratic	29,285	40.4%
2018	State Senator	General	Donald F. Humason Jr.	Republican	45,300	97.9%				

Westfield mayoral election, 2019

Candidates	Preliminary election		General election	
	Votes	%	Votes	%
Donald F. Humason, Jr.	1,793	46%	4,983	50%
Michael A. McCabe	1,690	44%	4,886	50%
Kristen Mello	355	9%		
Andrew Mullen	29	1%		

Westfield mayoral election, 2021

Candidates	General election	
	Votes	%
Michael A. McCabe	4,714	55.1%
Donald F. Humason, Jr. (incumbent)	3,846	44.9%

== See also ==
- 2019–2020 Massachusetts legislature
