= Massachusetts Senate's Hampden district =

American legislative district

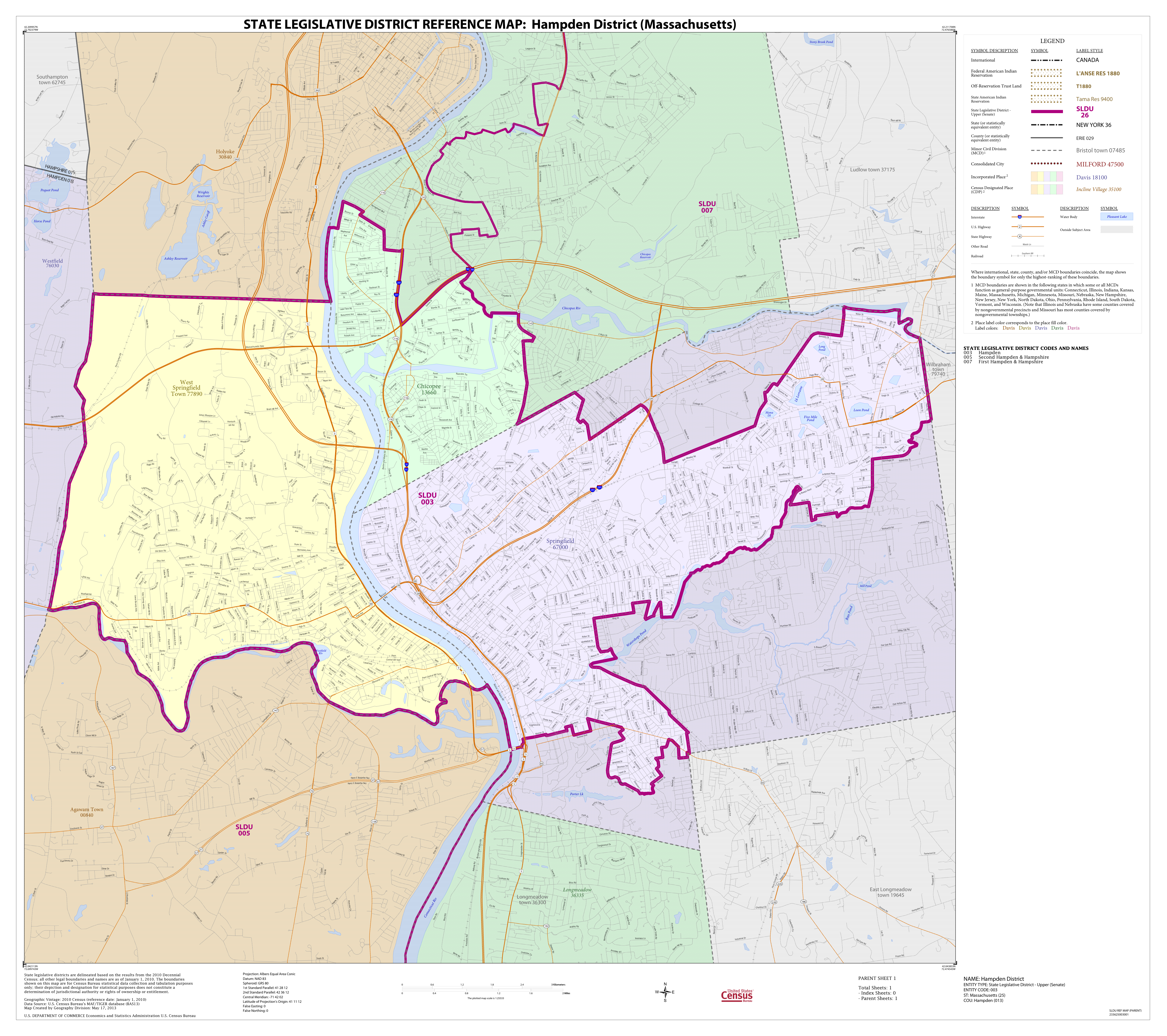
Map of Massachusetts Senate's Hampden district, based on the 2010 United States census.

Massachusetts Senate's Hampden district in the United States is one of 40 legislative districts of the Massachusetts Senate. It covers portions of Hampden county including most of the majority of in Springfield (7/8), and a half of Chicopee . Democrat Adam Gomez of Springfield, Massachusetts has represented the district since 2021.

== Locales represented ==
The district includes the following localities:

- 50 percent part of Chicopee
- 7/8 part of Springfield

The current district geographic boundary overlaps with those of the Massachusetts House of Representatives' 6th Hampden, 7th Hampden, 8th Hampden, 9th Hampden, 10th Hampden, 11th Hampden, and 12th Hampden districts.

== List of senators ==
- Amasa Holcomb, senator in 1852
- Stanley John Zarod, circa 1979

Senator	Party	Years	Legis.	Electoral history	District towns
District created in 1975.
Stanley J. Zarod	Democratic	1975 – 1981	169th 170th 171st	Redistricted from 1st Hampden district. Re-elected in 1974. Re-elected in 1976. Re-elected in 1978. Lost Democratic primary in 1980.	
Martin T. Reilly	Democratic	1981 – 1987	172nd 173rd 174th	Elected in 1980. Re-elected in 1982. Re-elected in 1984. Retired.	
District eliminated in 1987. District restored in 1995.
Linda Melconian	Democratic	1995 – 2005	179th 180th 181st 182nd 183rd	Redistricted from 1st Hampden district. Re-elected in 1994. Re-elected in 1996. Re-elected in 1998. Re-elected in 2000. Re-elected in 2002.	
Stephen Buoniconti	Democratic	January 2005– January 5, 2011	184th 185th 186th	Elected in 2004. Re-elected in 2006. Re-elected in 2008. Re-elected in 2012. Resigned on April 2, 2012.	
James T. Welch	Democratic	January 5, 2011 – January 5, 2021	187th 188th 189th 190th 191st	Elected in 2010. Re-elected in 2012. Re-elected in 2014. Re-elected in 2016. Re-elected in 2018. Lost Democratic primary in 2020.	
Adam Gomez	Democratic	January 6, 2021–	192nd	Elected in 2020.	

== See also ==
- List of Massachusetts Senate elections
- List of Massachusetts General Courts
- List of former districts of the Massachusetts Senate
- Other Hampden County districts of the Massachusett Senate: Berkshire, Hampshire, Franklin, and Hampden; 1st Hampden and Hampshire; 2nd Hampden and Hampshire
- Hampden County districts of the Massachusetts House of Representatives: 1st, 2nd, 3rd, 4th, 5th, 6th, 7th, 8th, 9th, 10th, 11th, 12th
