= Brian P. Sullivan =

American politician

Brian Sullivan
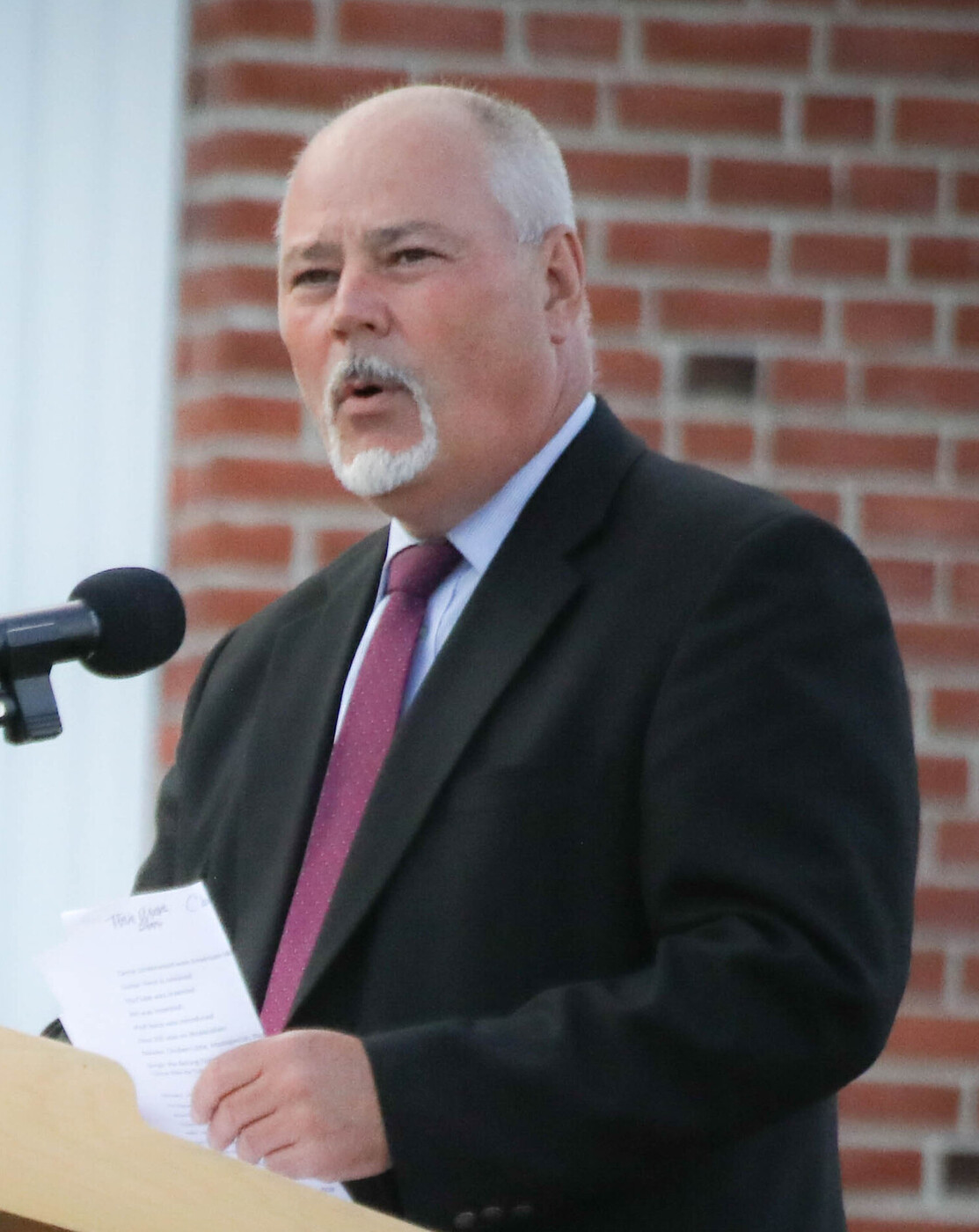

Director of the Green Communities Division of the Department of Energy Resources
- In office November 12, 2019 – January 3, 2022
- Preceded by: Joanne Bissetta (acting)
- Succeeded by: Joanne Bissetta

Mayor of Westfield
- In office January 4, 2016 – November 8, 2019; Acting: November 9, 2015 – January 4, 2016
- Preceded by: Daniel Knapik
- Succeeded by: Donald Humason Jr.

Member of the Westfield City Council, At-large
- In office 1998–2016

Personal details
- Born: Brian Patrick Sullivan; April 2, 1963 (age 63) Westfield, Massachusetts, U.S.
- Party: Democratic
- Relations: Rick Sullivan (brother)
- Education: Assumption College (Class of 1985)
- Occupation: Politician
- Website: Campaign website Government website

Brian Patrick Sullivan (born April 2, 1963) is an American politician who served as mayor of Westfield, Massachusetts from 2016 to 2019. Prior to his election, he served as a Westfield City Councilor from 1998 to 2016. He is a member of the Democratic Party.

In 1998, Sullivan was elected as an At-Large city councilor and has been re-elected nine times. During his tenure, he has served a total of 5 one-year terms as council president, the highest leadership position on the council. As president of the city council, he is first in line to succeed the mayor. When incumbent Mayor Daniel Knapik opted to not run for a fourth term in 2015, Sullivan declared his candidacy and defeated challenger Michael L. Roeder in the November municipal election.

When Knapik resigned to take a position in Governor Charlie Baker's administration, Sullivan was sworn in as acting mayor and served the remainder of his predecessor's term before beginning his first term on January 4, 2016. He was sworn into office on January 6, 2016, at the Westfield Technical Academy by his father and was succeeded as City Council president by Councilor Brent Bean, II. In January 2019, Sullivan stated that he would not be running for re-election. On November 8, 2019, he resigned and on November 12 joined Charlie Baker's cabinet as the Director of Green Communities within the Massachusetts Department of Energy and Environmental Affairs. City Council President and Ward 2 Councilor Ralph J. Figy was sworn in as Acting Mayor of Westfield on November 12.

== Electoral history ==
Westfield mayoral election, 2015
Party	Candidate	Votes	%
Nonpartisan	Brian Sullivan	4,430	56
Nonpartisan	Michael Roeder	3,425	44
