= Kelly Pease =

American politician from Massachusetts

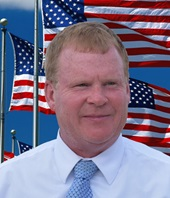

Member of the Massachusetts House of Representatives from the 4th Hampden district
- Incumbent
- Assumed office January 6, 2021
- Preceded by: John Velis

Member of the Board of Selectmen for Chester
- In office 1987–1990

Personal details
- Born: September 24, 1965 (age 60) Chester, Massachusetts, US
- Party: Republican
- Spouse: Serena Pease (m. 2010)
- Children: 2
- Education: Excelsior University (B.S); Westfield State University; Western New England University (M.S.)
- Website: Legislative website

Military service
- Allegiance: United States
- Branch/service: US Army
- Years of service: 1991–2011
- Rank: Chief Warrant Officer

Kelly W. Pease is an American state legislator and Republican member of the Massachusetts House of Representatives from the 4th Hampden district.

== See also ==
- 2021–2022 Massachusetts legislature
