= John Velis =

American politician

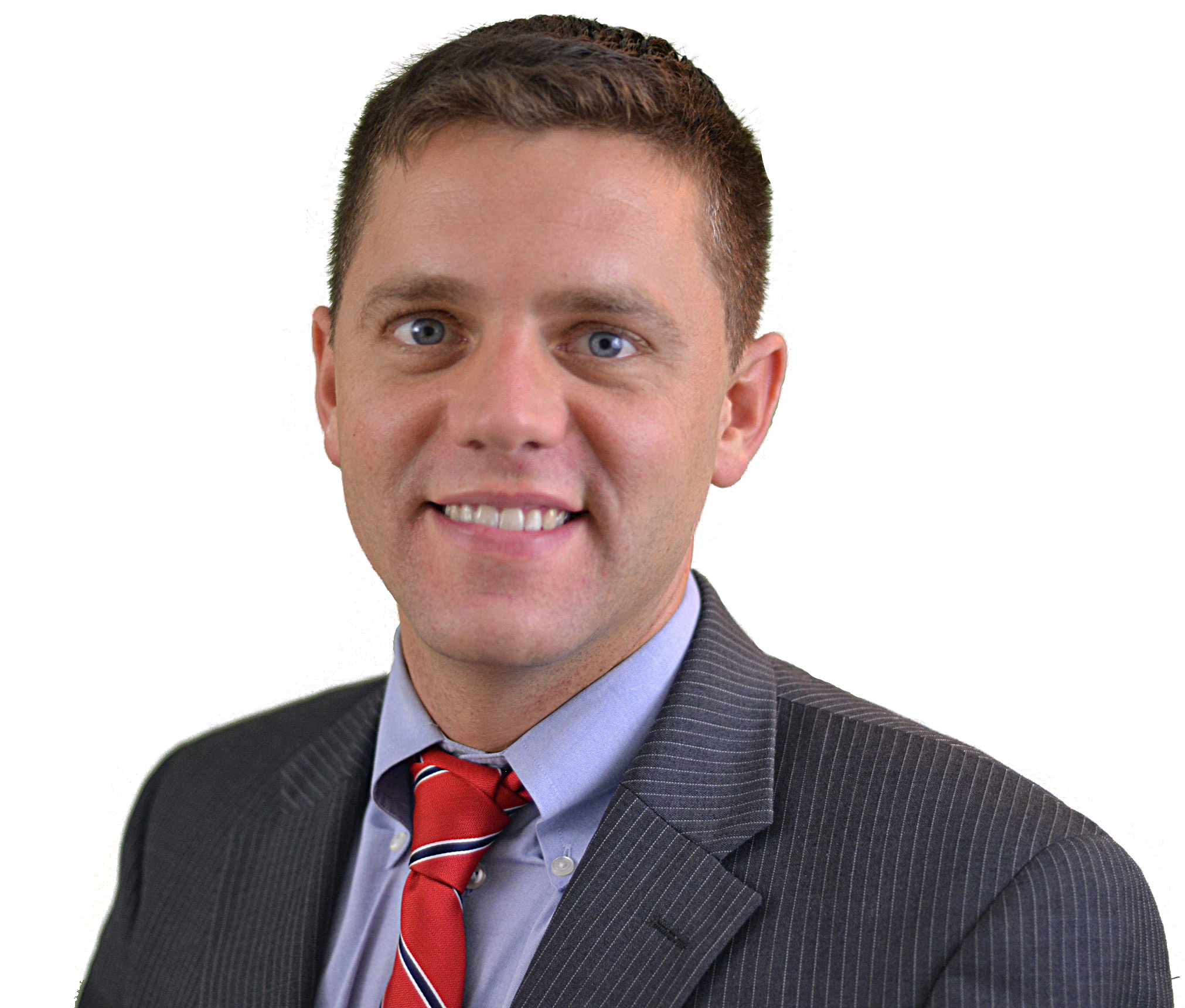

Member of the Massachusetts Senate
- Incumbent
- Assumed office May 28, 2020
- Preceded by: Donald Humason Jr.
- Constituency: 2nd Hampden and Hampshire (2020–2023); Hampden and Hampshire (2023–present)

Member of the Massachusetts House of Representatives from the 4th Hampden district
- In office April 16, 2014 – May 28, 2020
- Preceded by: Donald Humason Jr.
- Succeeded by: Kelly Pease

Personal details
- Born: John Christopher Velis Westfield, Massachusetts
- Party: Democratic
- Relations: Peter Velis (uncle)
- Children: 1
- Education: University of South Florida (BS); Suffolk University (JD)
- Occupation: Attorney
- Website: Legislative website Campaign website

Military service
- Allegiance: United States
- Branch/service: United States Army: United States Army Reserve
- Years of service: 2011–present
- Rank: Major
- Unit: 3rd Legal Operations Detachment, Judge Advocate General's Corps
- Battles/wars: War in Afghanistan
- Awards: Bronze Star

John Christopher Velis is an American state legislator and Democratic member of the Massachusetts Senate since 2020. He previously represented the 2nd Hampden and Hampshire district, which includes his hometown of Westfield, and currently represents the Hampden and Hampshire district after the 2020 census. Prior his election to the state senate, Velis was a member of the Massachusetts House of Representatives from 2014 to 2020.

== Early life, education, and career ==
Velis was born in Westfield, Massachusetts to Susan and Jim Velis, one of three children with his brother Adam and sister Jennifer. His uncle, Peter Velis, served as a Hampden Superior Court Judge from 1999 to 2012 and member of the Massachusetts House of Representatives, where he represented the 5th Hampden district (Southampton, Montgomery, and Westfield) from 1973 to 1979. He was educated at Westfield High School and graduated in 1998, attended Roxbury Community College, graduated from University of South Florida in 2004 with a Bachelor of Science in political science, and from Suffolk University Law School in 2008 with a Juris Doctor.

Prior to practicing law with his uncle, Velis spent time a number of government settings holding internships in the Hampden County District attorney's office, Hampden County Superior Court and the Massachusetts Treasurer's office. He was also an intern at the White House during the term of President George W. Bush. After returning to civilian life, Velis was appointed by Westfield Mayor Daniel Knapik to the Commission for Citizens with Disabilities and is a volunteer basketball coach for the Greater Westfield Boys & Girls Club.

== Political career ==
=== Massachusetts House of Representatives ===
In 2014, Velis declared his candidacy for the Massachusetts House of Representatives, representing the 4th Hampden District seat held by incumbent Republican state representative Donald Humason Jr. During the same year, however, Humason won a special election to the Massachusetts Senate after State Senator Michael Knapik resigned to take a job at Westfield State University, triggering another special election. He was unopposed in the Democratic primary and defeated Republican opponent At-large City Councilor Dan Allie in the general election on April 1, becoming the first Democrat to represent Westfield in 35 years. He began serving the remaining seven months of Humason's House term and campaigned for a first full-term in the regular November election, defeating Allie in a rematch.

In 2016 and 2018, he was re-elected to a respective second and third term unopposed.

=== Massachusetts Senate ===
On November 8, 2019, Velis announced his candidacy for the Massachusetts Senate's 2nd Hampden and Hampshire district seat following his predecessor Donald Humason Jr.'s election as Mayor of Westfield. He was challenged by Republican John Cain of Southwick, a businessman and former Navy officer. On May 19, 2020, with the election delayed by the COVID-19 pandemic, Velis won the Senate seat over Cain with 64 percent of the vote, becoming the first Democrat in 25 years to represent the 2nd Hampden and Hampshire district. He defeated Cain in a rematch. Velis was re-elected to a second term in 2022, defeating Agawam city councilor Cecilia Calabrese.

==== Towns represented ====
In Hampden County: Agawam, Chicopee (Ward 7 - Precinct 7A, Precinct 9A), Holyoke, Montgomery, Russell, Westfield, and West Springfield.
In Hampshire County: Easthampton and Southampton.

== Military service ==
Velis enlisted in the United States Army Reserve in 2011 and is currently serving in the Judge Advocate General (JAG) Corps as part of the 3rd Legal Operations Detachment. While on active duty in Afghanistan, Velis participated in the War in Afghanistan's Operation Enduring Freedom and taught the Rule of Law to tribal leaders and brought warring parties together to achieve peaceful solutions, overseeing all ISAF-NATO rule of law efforts throughout the Zabul Province in the war-torn nation.

In August 2017, Velis was sent to South Korea for about a month to participate in joint military training exercises with the U.S. Army and allies. On July 4, 2018, Velis was promoted to the rank of major while on deployment in Afghanistan.

== Political positions ==
Velis describes himself as a fiscally conservative Democrat. Prior to running for state representative in 2014, Velis described himself as a fiscally conservative Republican.

=== Taxes ===
Velis supported a $36.3 billion fiscal year 2015 budget with no tax increases and voted in favor of in-state tuition for veterans at Massachusetts State colleges and universities at about 12:00 AM on Thursday, May 1, securing about $165,000 in the house budget for the city of Westfield. How the funds are allocated, $100,000 to Noble Hospital will increase ease of access to the front entrance for older adults and the disabled; $50,000 grant for new Senior Center furnishings to make it more inviting to a wider range of older adults, host more activities and increase its use; and $15,000 to stimulate the local business community.

He did not vote on Bill H.4111, a bill that appropriates funds for the expansion of the Boston Convention and Exhibition Center; rather deciding to abstain from voting, showing neither support or opposition.

He voted in favor of increasing the minimum wage from $8.00 per hour to $11.00 per hour by 2017.

He voted for the 2018 Car Rental Tax Surcharge, which added a $2 tax surcharge to automobile rentals.

=== Education ===
Velis cosponsored Bill H.4200 with Representative John Scibak, a petition relative to the scheduling of high school athletic contests. He was one of 35 legislators to vote "no" on Bill H.4091, a bill that authorizes the expansion of charter schools in certain communities.

=== Disability rights ===
Velis cast his first vote in support of Bill H.4047, a bill relative to assisting individuals with autism and other intellectual or developmental disabilities. This legislation is intended to improve educational opportunities and access to services for people with autism or other intellectual disabilities. Bill H.4047 would also create a special commission to look at state policies dealing with individuals with autism, and allow families to set aside money tax free in savings accounts to pay and plan for the long-term care and housing of children with intellectual disabilities.

=== Transportation ===
Velis has cosponsored Bill S.2169 with Senator Donald Humason Jr., a petition with the approval of the mayor and city council for legislation relative to the acceptance of Paper Mill Road as a public way in the city of Westfield.

=== Crime ===
Velis voted in support of Bill S.714, an act relative to juvenile life without parole sentences. Under the measure, people convicted of first-degree murder for crimes that occurred while they were between the ages of 14 and 18 could be eligible for parole after serving 20 to 25 years in prison. For crimes that were deemed to involve deliberate premeditated malice or extreme atrocity or cruelty, the wait would be 25 to 30 years.

=== Manufacturing ===
Velis has cosponsored Docket HD4311 with Representatives Diana DiZoglio and Jonathan Zlotnik, otherwise known as An Act Relative to the Taxation of Inventory in Manufacturing. According to DiZoglio, the bill is designed to gradually eliminate the inventory tax manufacturers pay on raw materials over a period of four years.

=== Gun rights ===
In 2015, Velis introduced legislation on behalf of Gun Owners Action League (GOAL) and the Massachusetts affiliate of the National Rifle Association of America that would create a commission to review policies regarding the alleged dangers of gun free zones, which GOAL said had become targets for terrorists and murderers. Velis is opposed to legislation limiting the gun rights of law-abiding citizens. He was one of 11 Democrats to vote against House Speaker Robert DeLeo's bill aimed at preventing gun violence.

=== Israel ===
In January 2025, Velis was criticized for accepting a free trip to Israel funded by the Israeli government, while also acting as cochair for a commission on antisemitism in Massachusetts. Velis, along with Simon Cataldo, have been accused of political grandstanding and misleading conduct toward educators at the February 2025 combatting antisemitism commission hearing.

== Electoral history ==
State Legislature

Election results
Year	Office	Election	Subject	Party	Votes	%	Opponent	Party	Votes	%
2014	State Representative	Special	John C. Velis	Democratic	2,697	53.4%	Daniel J. Allie	Republican	2,354	46.6%
2014	State Representative	General	John C. Velis	Democratic	7,327	58.9%	Daniel J. Allie	Republican	5,111	41.1%
2016	State Representative	General	John C. Velis	Democratic	15,399	99.4%				
2018	State Representative	General	John C. Velis	Democratic	11,734	99.1%				
2020	State Senator	Special	John C. Velis	Democratic	10,083	64.2%	John F. Cain	Republican	5,619	35.8%
2020	State Senator	General	John C. Velis	Democratic	49,656	64.0%	John F. Cain	Republican	27,907	36.0%
2022	State Senator	General	John C. Velis	Democratic	37,130	65.6%	Cecilia P. Calabrese	Republican	19,388	34.3%
2024	State Senator	General	John C. Velis	Democratic	62,335	98.7%				

== See also ==
- 2019–2020 Massachusetts legislature
- 2021–2022 Massachusetts legislature

Massachusetts House of Representatives
Preceded by Donald Humason Jr.	Member of the Massachusetts House of Representatives from the 4th Hampden district 2014–2020	Succeeded by Kelly Pease
Massachusetts Senate
Preceded by Donald Humason Jr.	Member of the Massachusetts Senate from the 2nd Hampden and Hampshire district 2020–2023	Succeeded by Constituency abolished
Preceded by Constituency established	Member of the Massachusetts Senate from the Hampden and Hampshire district 2023–present	Incumbent
