= Cele Hahn =

American broadcaster and politician

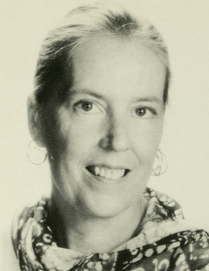

Member of the Massachusetts House of Representatives from the 4th Hampden District
- In office 1995–2003
- Preceded by: Michael Knapik
- Succeeded by: Donald Humason Jr.

Personal details
- Born: March 21, 1942 Sioux City, Iowa
- Died: April 11, 2014 (aged 72) San Pancho, Mexico
- Party: Republican
- Education: University of Iowa
- Occupation: Broadcaster; Politician

Cele Ferner Hahn (March 21, 1942 – April 11, 2014) was an American broadcaster and politician who represented the 4th Hampden District in the Massachusetts House of Representatives from 1995–2003. Born in Sioux City, Iowa, Hahn received her bachelor's degree in journalism from University of Iowa. Hahn and her husband Curt owned WNNZ radio in Springfield, Massachusetts. She also edited several newspapers.

== Early life ==
Cele's parents were Arnold and Celia Ferner and she attended public schools in Iowa, including East High School where she edited the school paper.
