= Veliš =

Veliš may refer to places in the Czech Republic:

- Veliš (Benešov District), a municipality and village in the Central Bohemian Region
- Veliš (Jičín District), a municipality and village in the Hradec Králové Region
