= Iris Holland =

American politician (1920-2001)

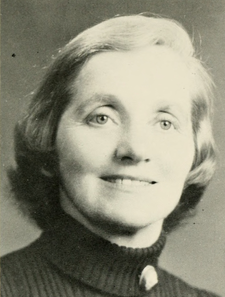
Iris Holland, circa 1975

Iris Kaufman Holland (September 30, 1920 – July 19, 2001) was an American politician.

Born in Springfield, Massachusetts, Holland went to Rider College. She lived in New London, Connecticut for twelve years, then moved back to Springfield, Massachusetts, and subsequently moved to Longmeadow, Massachusetts. Holland served in the Massachusetts House of Representatives from 1973 until 1991 as a Republican. She died in Longmeadow, Massachusetts. She was Jewish.

== See also ==
- Massachusetts House of Representatives' 2nd Hampden district
- 169th Massachusetts General Court
