= Peter A. Velis =

American politician

Peter Velis
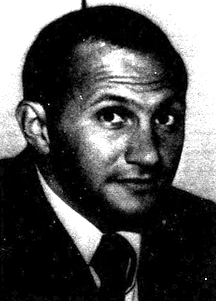

Associate Justice of the Massachusetts Superior Court
- In office 1999–2012
- Appointed by: Paul Cellucci
- Succeeded by: Edward J. McDonough Jr.

Member of the Massachusetts House of Representatives from the 5th Hampden district
- In office 1973–1979
- Preceded by: James J. Bowler
- Succeeded by: Robert Rohan

Personal details
- Born: October 8, 1942 (age 83) Springfield, Massachusetts
- Party: Republican
- Relations: John Velis (nephew)
- Education: Boston University (B.S.); Suffolk University Law School (J.D.)
- Occupation: Attorney

Peter A. Velis (born October 8, 1942) is a former American judge who served on the Massachusetts Superior Court from 1999 to 2012. From 1973 to 1979 he was a Republican state legislator who served in the Massachusetts House of Representatives, representing the Fifth Hampden district from Westfield, Massachusetts.
