= Michael Knapik =

American politician

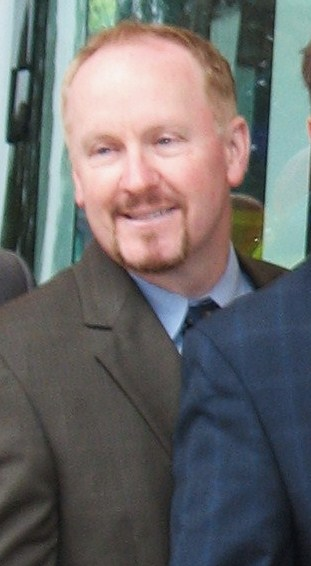

Member of the Massachusetts Senate from the 2nd Hampden and Hampshire district
- In office 1995 – August 9, 2013
- Preceded by: District created
- Succeeded by: Donald Humason Jr.

Member of the Massachusetts House of Representatives from the 4th Hampden district
- In office 1991–1995
- Preceded by: Steven Pierce
- Succeeded by: Cele Hahn

Personal details
- Born: February 11, 1963 (age 63) Westfield, Massachusetts, U.S.
- Party: Republican
- Spouse: Kathleen Ann Duggan
- Education: College of the Holy Cross (BA)

Michael R. Knapik (born February 11, 1963) is an American politician who served in the Massachusetts Senate (1995–2013) and Massachusetts House of Representatives (1991–1995). In the state Senate he represented the 2nd Hampden and Hampshire District. He is a member of the Republican Party.

He was born in Westfield, Massachusetts. Prior to being sworn into the Senate in 1995, he was a member of the Massachusetts House of Representatives from 1991 to 1995 and a member of the Westfield School Committee from 1986-1990. He was also worked as an aide to State Representative Steven Pierce. His Senate district included Chicopee, Holyoke, Westfield, Easthampton, Granville, Montgomery, Russell, Southampton, Southwick, and Tolland, Massachusetts.

Knapik resigned August 9, 2013 to take a position at Westfield State University, leaving only three Republicans in the state Senate.

He is the brother of Daniel Knapik, who served as Mayor of Westfield from 2010 to 2015.
