= Massachusetts House of Representatives' 12th Hampden district =

American legislative district

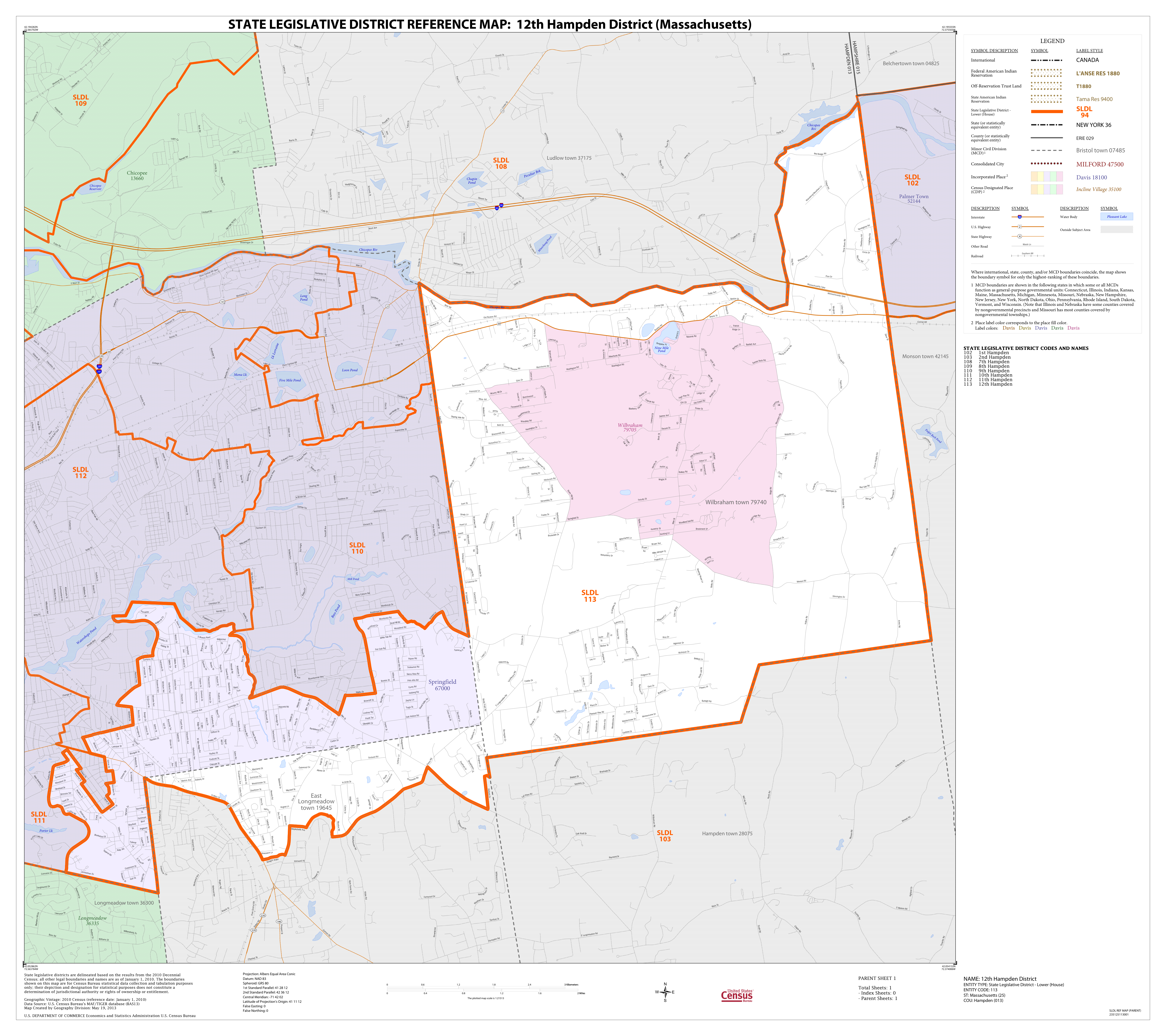
Map of Massachusetts House of Representatives' 12th Hampden district, based on the 2010 United States census.

Massachusetts House of Representatives' 12th Hampden district in the United States is one of 160 legislative districts included in the lower house of the Massachusetts General Court. It covers part of Hampden County. Since 2007, Angelo J. Puppolo, Jr. of the Democratic Party has represented the district.

== Towns represented ==
The district includes the following localities:

- part of East Longmeadow
- part of Springfield
- Wilbraham

The current district geographic boundary overlaps with those of the Massachusetts Senate's 1st Hampden and Hampshire district and Hampden district.

== Representatives ==
- Raymond A. Jordan
- Benjamin Swan
- Gale D. Candaras
- Angelo J. Puppolo, Jr., 2007-current

== See also ==
- List of Massachusetts House of Representatives elections
- List of Massachusetts General Courts
- List of former districts of the Massachusetts House of Representatives

== Images ==
Portraits of legislators

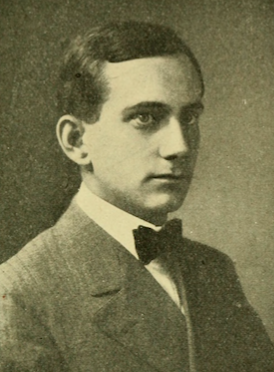
Lewis Parker

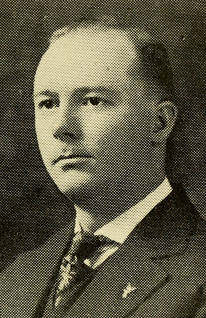
Dexter Snow

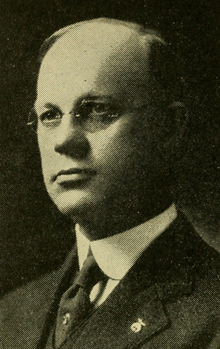
Harold Howard

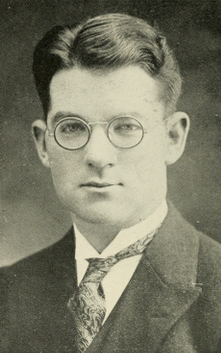
John Falvey

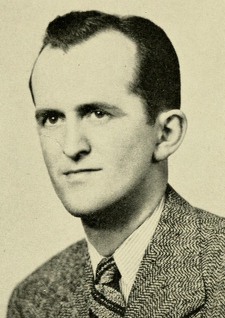
Howard Driscoll

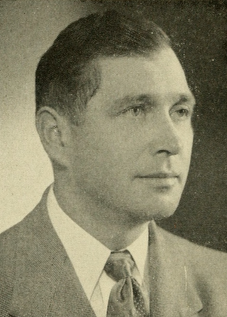
Stephen Thomas Chmura

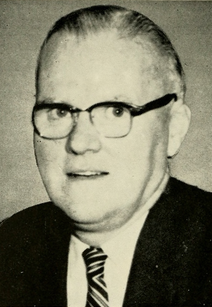
Arthur McKenna

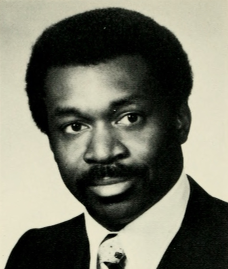
Raymond Jordan

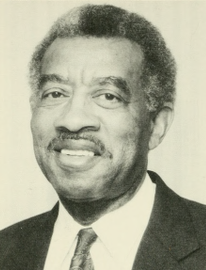
Benjamin Swan

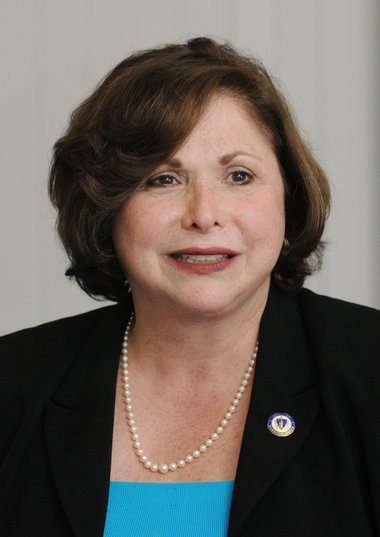
Gale Candaras
