= 2026 Massachusetts Senate election =

- November 3, 2026

All 40 seats in the Massachusetts Senate 21 seats needed for a majority
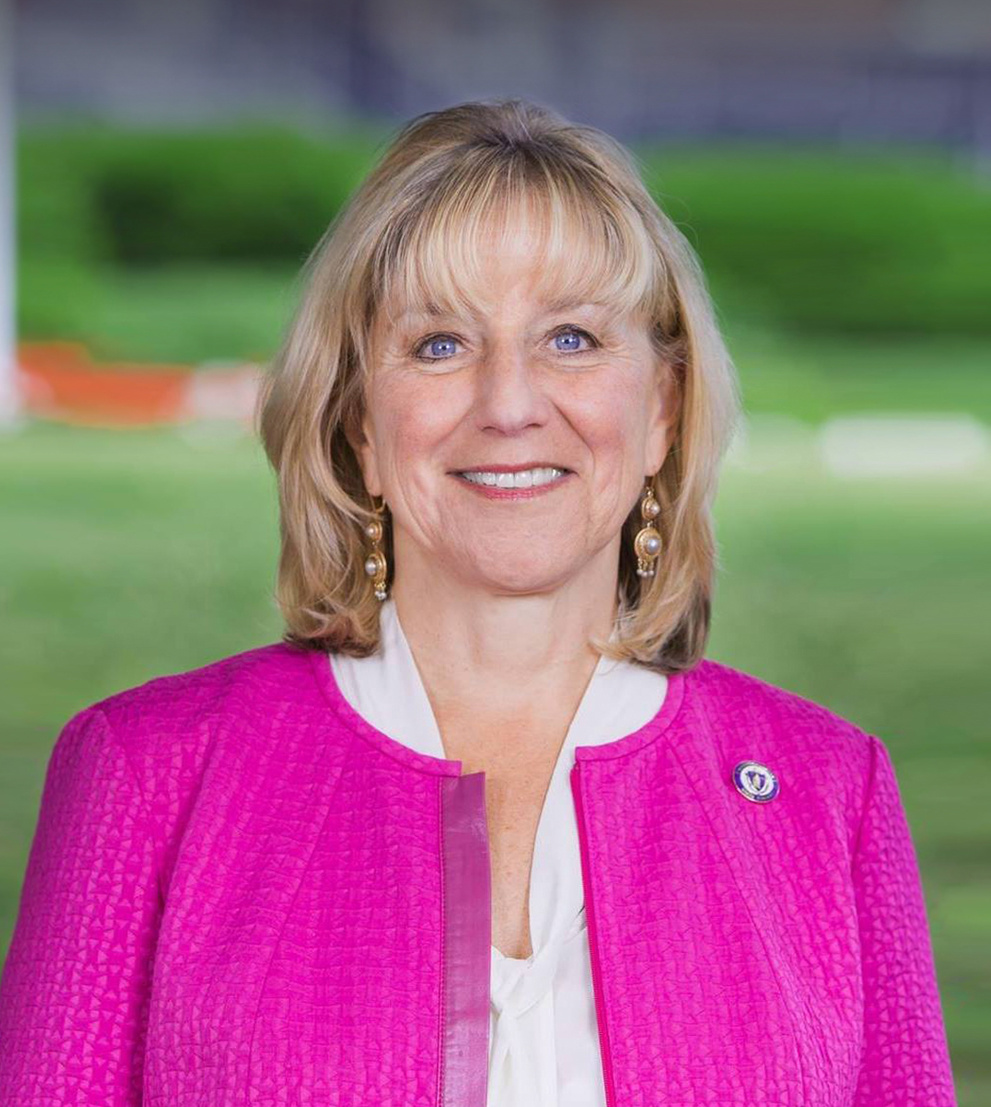

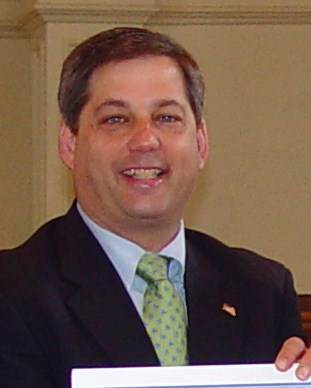
	Majority party	Minority party
Leader	Karen Spilka	Bruce Tarr
Party	Democratic	Republican
Leader since	February 28, 2018	January 3, 2011
Leader's seat	Middlesex and Norfolk	1st Essex and Middlesex
Last election	35 seats	5 seats
Seats before	35	5
Seats after	35	5
Seat change	Steady	Steady
President before election
Karen Spilka
Democratic
Elected President
TBD

The 2026 Massachusetts Senate election was held on November 3, 2026, alongside the other 2026 United States elections. Primary elections were held on September 1, 2026. Voters elected members of the Massachusetts Senate in all 40 of the U.S. state of Massachusetts's legislative districts to serve a two-year term. The election coincided with United States national elections and Massachusetts state elections, including U.S. Senate, U.S. House, Governor, and Massachusetts House.

Democrats won 35 seats in 2024. This fell to 34 after state senator Ed Kennedy died in October 2025. He was replaced in a special election by fellow Democrat Vanna Howard, bringing Democrats back to 35 seats. Republicans would need to net 16 seats to flip control of the chamber. However, Republicans are leaving 29 seats—a majority—uncontested.

== 2026 special election: 1st Middlesex ==
A special election in the 1st Middlesex district was called after Democratic senator Ed Kennedy died in October 2025. The election was won by Democratic state representative Vanna Howard.

Primary election results
Party	Candidate	Votes	%
Democratic Party primary results
Democratic	Vanna Howard	3,339	58.14%
Democratic	Rodney Elliot	2,375	41.35%
Write-in		29	0.50%
Total votes		5,743	100.00%
Republican Party primary results
Republican	Sam Meas (write-in)	372	59.42%
Write-in		254	40.58%
Total votes		626	100.00%

General election results
Party	Candidate	Votes	%
Democratic	Vanna Howard	4,306	58.19%
Republican	Sam Meas	1,699	22.96%
Independent	Joe Espinola	1,379	18.64%
Write-in		16	0.22%
Total votes		7,400	100.00%
Democratic hold			

== Retirements ==
1. 2nd Middlesex: Patricia D. Jehlen is retiring.
2. 5th Middlesex: Jason Lewis is retiring.

== Predictions ==
Source	Ranking	As of
Sabato's Crystal Ball	Safe D	January 22, 2026
State Navigate	Safe D	October 21, 2026

== Summary of results by Senate district ==
Senate district	2024 Pres.	Incumbent	Party	Elected Senator	Party
Berkshire, Hampden, Franklin and Hampshire	D+33.3	Paul Mark	Dem	Paul Mark	Dem
Bristol and Norfolk	D+15.8	Paul Feeney	Dem	Paul Feeney	Dem
1st Bristol and Plymouth	R+6.9	Michael Rodrigues	Dem	Michael Rodrigues	Dem
2nd Bristol and Plymouth	D+3.1	Mark Montigny	Dem	Mark Montigny	Dem
3rd Bristol and Plymouth	R+4.7	Kelly Dooner	Rep	Kelly Dooner	Rep
Cape and Islands	D+27.6	Julian Cyr	Dem	Julian Cyr	Dem
1st Essex	D+9.8	Pavel Payano	Dem	Pavel Payano	Dem
2nd Essex	D+23.0	Joan Lovely	Dem	Joan Lovely	Dem
3rd Essex	D+18.7	Brendan Crighton	Dem	Brendan Crighton	Dem
1st Essex and Middlesex	D+22.6	Bruce Tarr	Rep	Bruce Tarr	Rep
2nd Essex and Middlesex	D+14.4	Barry Finegold	Dem	Barry Finegold	Dem
Hampden	D+29.3	Adam Gomez	Dem	Adam Gomez	Dem
Hampden, Hampshire and Worcester	D+8.0	Jacob Oliveira	Dem	Jacob Oliveira	Dem
Hampden and Hampshire	D+9.0	John Velis	Dem	John Velis	Dem
Hampshire, Franklin and Worcester	D+42.0	Jo Comerford	Dem	Jo Comerford	Dem
1st Middlesex	D+11.0	Vanna Howard	Dem	Vanna Howard	Dem
2nd Middlesex	D+61.7	Patricia Jehlen	Dem	Erika Uyterhoeven	Dem
3rd Middlesex	D+42.8	Michael Barrett	Dem	Michael Barrett	Dem
4th Middlesex	D+32.2	Cindy Friedman	Dem	Cindy Friedman	Dem
5th Middlesex	D+31.8	Jason Lewis	Dem	Kate Lipper-Garabedian	Dem
Norfolk and Middlesex	D+61.9	Cynthia Creem	Dem	Cynthia Creem	Dem
Middlesex and Norfolk	D+40.0	Karen Spilka	Dem	Karen Spilka	Dem
Middlesex and Suffolk	D+55.7	Sal DiDomenico	Dem	Sal DiDomenico	Dem
Middlesex and Worcester	D+40.8	James Eldridge	Dem	James Eldridge	Dem
Norfolk, Plymouth and Bristol	D+20.2	William Driscoll	Dem	William Driscoll	Dem
Norfolk, Worcester and Middlesex	D+23.3	Rebecca Rausch	Dem	Rebecca Rausch	Dem
Norfolk and Plymouth	D+13.9	John Keenan	Dem	John Keenan	Dem
Norfolk and Suffolk	D+34.4	Michael Rush	Dem	Persis Yu	Dem
Plymouth and Barnstable	D+10.5	Dylan Fernandes	Dem	Dylan Fernandes	Dem
1st Plymouth and Norfolk	D+18.5	Patrick O'Connor	Rep	Patrick O'Connor	Rep
2nd Plymouth and Norfolk	D+22.2	Michael Brady	Dem	Michael Brady	Dem
1st Suffolk	D+48.5	Nicholas Collins	Dem	Nicholas Collins	Dem
2nd Suffolk	D+74.0	Liz Miranda	Dem	Liz Miranda	Dem
3rd Suffolk	D+34.1	Lydia Edwards	Dem	Lydia Edwards	Dem
Suffolk and Middlesex	D+61.6	William Brownsberger	Dem	William Brownsberger	Dem
1st Worcester	D+29.5	Robyn Kennedy	Dem	Robyn Kennedy	Dem
2nd Worcester	D+19.9	Michael Moore	Dem	Michael Moore	Dem
Worcester and Hampshire	D+0.3	Peter Durant	Rep	Peter Durant	Rep
Worcester and Middlesex	D+15.3	John Cronin	Dem	John Cronin	Dem
Worcester and Hampden	R+4.7	Ryan Fattman	Rep	Ryan Fattman	Rep

== Detailed results ==
Candidate lists and election results according to the Secretary of the Commonwealth of Massachusetts.

=== Berkshire, Hampden, Franklin and Hampshire ===
Incumbent Democrat Paul Mark is running for re-election. No candidates filed to run in the Republican primary, though one ran a write-in campaign.

Democratic primary
Party	Candidate	Votes	%
Democratic	Paul Mark (incumbent)	23,514	99.48%
Write-in		122	0.52%
Total votes		23,636	100.00%

Republican primary
Party	Candidate	Votes	%
Republican	Gabriel Greenspan (write-in)	81	39.51%
Write-in		124	60.49%
Total votes		205	100.00%

=== Bristol and Norfolk ===
Incumbent Democrat Paul Feeney is running for re-election. No candidates filed to run in the Republican primary.

Democratic primary
Party	Candidate	Votes	%
Democratic	Paul Feeney (incumbent)	17,955	99.81%
Write-in		35	0.19%
Total votes		17,990	100.00%

=== 1st Bristol and Plymouth ===
Incumbent Democrat Michael Rodrigues is running for re-election. He will face Gabriel "Boomer" Amaral, the winner of the Republican primary.

Democratic primary
Party	Candidate	Votes	%
Democratic	Michael Rodrigues (incumbent)	11,929	99.81%
Write-in		23	0.19%
Total votes		11,952	100.00%

Republican primary
Party	Candidate	Votes	%
Republican	Gabriel "Boomer" Amaral	3,573	50.47%
Republican	Manny Silva	3,488	49.27%
Write-in		19	0.27%
Total votes		7,080	100.00%

=== 2nd Bristol and Plymouth ===
Incumbent Democrat Mark Montigny is running for re-election and was unopposed in the Democratic primary. Robert McConnell ran unopposed for the Republican nomination.

Democratic primary
Party	Candidate	Votes	%
Democratic	Mark Montigny (incumbent)	12,866	99.31%
Write-in		89	0.69%
Total votes		12,955	100.00%

Republican primary
Party	Candidate	Votes	%
Republican	Robert McConnell	6,210	99.03%
Write-in		61	0.97%
Total votes		6,271	100.00%

=== 3rd Bristol and Plymouth ===
Incumbent Republican Kelly Dooner is running for re-election. No candidates filed to run in the Democratic primary.

Republican primary
Party	Candidate	Votes	%
Republican	Kelly Dooner (incumbent)	8,437	99.75%
Write-in		21	0.25%
Total votes		8,458	100.00%

=== Cape and Islands ===
Incumbent Democrat Julian Cyr is running for re-election. No candidates filed to run in the Republican primary.

Democratic primary
Party	Candidate	Votes	%
Democratic	Julian Cyr (incumbent)	27,905	99.57%
Write-in		120	0.43%
Total votes			100.00%

=== 1st Essex ===
Incumbent Democrat Pavel Payano is running for re-election. No candidates filed to run in the Republican primary, though one write-in candidate filed.

Democratic primary
Party	Candidate	Votes	%
Democratic	Pavel Payano (incumbent)	7,447	98.05%
Write-in		148	1.95%
Total votes		7,595	100.00%

Republican primary
Party	Candidate	Votes	%
Republican	Fraylin S. Angelina (write-in)	76	13.26%
Write-in		497	86.74%
Total votes		573	100.00%

=== 2nd Essex ===
Incumbent Democrat Joan Lovely is running for re-election. No candidates filed to run in the Republican primary.

Democratic primary
Party	Candidate	Votes	%
Democratic	Joan Lovely (incumbent)	23,628	98.79%
Write-in		92	0.38%
Total votes		23,918	100.00%

=== 3rd Essex ===
Incumbent Democrat Brendan Crighton is running for re-election. No candidates filed to run in the Republican primary.

Democratic primary
Party	Candidate	Votes	%
Democratic	Brendan Crighton (incumbent)	16,630	99.62%
Write-in		63	0.38%
Total votes		16,693	100.00%

=== 1st Essex and Middlesex ===
Incumbent Republican Bruce Tarr is running for re-election. No candidates filed to run in the Democratic primary.

Republican primary
Party	Candidate	Votes	%
Republican	Bruce Tarr (incumbent)	9,995	99.36%
Write-in		64	0.64%
Total votes		10,059	100.00%

=== 2nd Essex and Middlesex ===
Incumbent Democrat Barry Finegold is running for re-election and was unopposed in the Democratic primary. Ted Semesnyei ran unopposed for the Republican nomination.

Democratic primary
Party	Candidate	Votes	%
Democratic	Barry Finegold (incumbent)	21,178	99.65%
Write-in		74	0.35%
Total votes		21,252	100.00%

Republican primary
Party	Candidate	Votes	%
Republican	Ted Semesnyei	6,909	99.11%
Write-in		62	0.89%
Total votes		6,971	100.00%

=== Hampden ===
Incumbent Democrat Adam Gomez is running for re-election. No candidates filed to run in the Republican primary.

Democratic primary
Party	Candidate	Votes	%
Democratic	Adam Gomez (incumbent)	10,739	98.88%
Write-in		122	1.12%
Total votes		10,861	100.00%

=== Hampden, Hampshire and Worcester ===
Incumbent Democrat Jacob Oliveira is running for re-election. No candidates filed to run in the Republican primary.

Democratic primary
Party	Candidate	Votes	%
Democratic	Jacob Oliveira (incumbent)	21,217	99.61%
Write-in		83	0.39%
Total votes		21,300	100.00%

=== Hampden and Hampshire ===
Incumbent Democrat John Velis is running for re-election. No candidates filed to run in the Republican primary.

Democratic primary
Party	Candidate	Votes	%
Democratic	John Velis (incumbent)	16,684	99.50%
Write-in		83	0.50%
Total votes		16,767	100.00%

=== Hampden, Franklin and Worcester ===
Incumbent Democrat Jo Comerford is running for re-election. No candidates filed to run in the Republican primary.

Democratic primary
Party	Candidate	Votes	%
Democratic	Jo Comerford (incumbent)	23,570	99.78%
Write-in		53	0.22%
Total votes		23,623	100.00%

=== 1st Middlesex ===
Incumbent Democrat Vanna Howard is running for re-election after previously winning a special election to succeed deceased representative Edward J. Kennedy. She was unopposed in the Democratic primary. Sam Meas ran unopposed for the Republican nomination.

Democratic primary
Party	Candidate	Votes	%
Democratic	Vanna Howard (incumbent)	12,604	98.88%
Write-in		143	1.12%
Total votes		12,747	100.00%

Republican primary
Party	Candidate	Votes	%
Republican	Sam Meas	4,000	99.08%
Write-in		37	0.92%
Total votes		4,037	100.00%

=== 2nd Middlesex ===
Incumbent Patricia D. Jehlen is retiring. The district covers Medford, Somerville, Winchester, and parts of northwest Cambridge. Five candidates qualified for the Democratic primary, which was won by Erika Uyterhoeven. No candidates filed to run in the Republican primary.

==== Democratic primary ====
===== Candidates =====
====== Nominee ======
- Erika Uyterhoeven, state representative from the 27th Middlesex district (2021–present)

====== Eliminated in primary ======
- Burhan Azeem, Cambridge city councilor and vice mayor
- Christine Barber, state representative from the 34th Middlesex district (2015–present)
- Tom Hopcroft, Winchester school committee member and climate entrepreneur
- Matt McLaughlin, Somerville city councilor from Ward 1

====== Declined ======
- Patricia D. Jehlen, incumbent state senator (2005–present)

===== Results =====
Democratic primary
Party	Candidate	Votes	%
Democratic	Erika Uyterhoeven	12,546	36.89%
Democratic	Christine Barber	10,340	30.40%
Democratic	Burhan Azeem	6,201	18.23%
Democratic	Matt McLaughlin	4,218	12.40%
Democratic	Tom Hopcroft	666	1.96%
Write-in		38	0.11%
Total votes		34,009	100.00%

=== 3rd Middlesex ===
Incumbent Democrat Michael J. Barrett is running for re-election. No candidates filed to run in the Republican primary.

Democratic primary
Party	Candidate	Votes	%
Democratic	Michael J. Barrett (incumbent)	22,343	99.73%
Write-in		60	0.27%
Total votes		22,403	100.00%

=== 4th Middlesex ===
Incumbent Democrat Cindy Friedman is running for re-election. No candidates filed to run in the Republican primary.

Democratic primary
Party	Candidate	Votes	%
Democratic	Cindy Friedman (incumbent)	23,319	99.75%
Write-in		59	0.25%
Total votes		22,403	100.00%

=== 5th Middlesex ===
Incumbent Jason Lewis is retiring. The district covers Melrose, Malden, Reading, Stoneham, Wakefield, and Winchester. Kate Lipper-Garabedian won the Democratic primary, which three candidates qualified for. No candidates filed to run in the Republican primary.

==== Democratic primary ====
===== Candidates =====
====== Nominee ======
- Kate Lipper-Garabedian, state representative from the 32nd Middlesex district (2020–present)

====== Eliminated in primary ======
- Carey McDonald, Malden city councilor-at-large
- Ryan O'Malley, Malden city councilor from Ward 4

====== Declined ======
- Jason Lewis, incumbent state senator (2014–present)
- Steve Ultrino, state representative from the 33rd Middlesex district (2015–present)
- Michael Day, state representative from the 31st Middlesex district (2015–present)

===== Endorsements =====
Kate Lipper-Garabedian

State senators

- Jason Lewis, incumbent state senator (2014–present)
Carey McDonald

Organizations

- Massachusetts Working Families Party

===== Results =====
Democratic primary
Party	Candidate	Votes	%
Democratic	Kate Lipper-Garabedian	15,890	63.23%
Democratic	Carey McDonald	5,825	23.18%
Democratic	Ryan O'Malley	3,319	13.21%
Write-in		98	0.39%
Total votes		25,132	100.00%

=== Norfolk and Middlesex ===
Incumbent Democrat Cynthia Stone Creem is running for re-election. No candidates filed to run in the Republican primary.

Democratic primary
Party	Candidate	Votes	%
Democratic	Cynthia Stone Creem (incumbent)	24,439	99.31%
Write-in		170	0.69%
Total votes		24,609	100.00%

=== Middlesex and Norfolk ===
Incumbent Democrat Karen Spilka is running for re-election. No candidates filed to run in the Republican primary.

Democratic primary
Party	Candidate	Votes	%
Democratic	Karen Spilka (incumbent)	21,480	99.56%
Write-in		94	0.44%
Total votes		21,574	100.00%

=== Middlesex and Suffolk ===
Incumbent Democrat Sal DiDomenico is running for re-election. No candidates filed to run in the Republican primary.

Democratic primary
Party	Candidate	Votes	%
Democratic	Sal DiDomenico (incumbent)	14,079	99.30%
Write-in		99	0.70%
Total votes		14,178	100.00%

=== Middlesex and Worcester ===
Incumbent Democrat Jamie Eldridge is running for re-election and was unopposed in the Democratic primary. Tim Shea ran unopposed for the Republican nomination.

Democratic primary
Party	Candidate	Votes	%
Democratic	Jamie Eldridge (incumbent)	23,038	99.73%
Write-in		63	0.27%
Total votes		23,101	100.00%

Republican primary
Party	Candidate	Votes	%
Republican	Tim Shea	4,515	99.25%
Write-in		34	0.75%
Total votes		4,549	100.00%

=== Norfolk, Plymouth and Bristol ===
Incumbent Democrat William Driscoll is running for re-election and defeated Tony King and Michael Zullas in the Democratic primary. No candidates filed to run in the Republican primary.

Democratic primary
Party	Candidate	Votes	%
Democratic	William Driscoll (incumbent)	12,787	62.19%
Democratic	Michael Zullas	5,331	25.93%
Democratic	Tony King	2,316	11.26%
Write-in		128	0.62%
Total votes		20,562	100.00%

=== Norfolk, Worcester and Middlesex ===
Incumbent Democrat Becca Rausch is running for re-election. No candidates filed to run in the Republican primary, though one write-in candidate registered.

Democratic primary
Party	Candidate	Votes	%
Democratic	Becca Rausch (incumbent)	20,531	99.42%
Write-in		120	0.58%
Total votes		20,651	100.00%

Republican primary
Party	Candidate	Votes	%
Republican	Charles Francis Bailey, III (write-in)	231	35.16%
Write-in		426	64.84%
Total votes		657	100.00%

=== Norfolk and Plymouth ===
Incumbent Democrat John F. Keenan is running for re-election. No candidates filed to run in the Republican primary.

Democratic primary
Party	Candidate	Votes	%
Democratic	John F. Keenan (incumbent)	16,218	99.22%
Write-in		127	0.78%
Total votes		16,345	100.00%

=== Norfolk and Suffolk ===
Incumbent Democrat Mike Rush ran for re-election but was defeated by Persis Yu in the Democratic primary. No candidates filed to run in the Republican primary.

Democratic primary
Party	Candidate	Votes	%
Democratic	Persis S. Yu	15,730	50.95%
Democratic	Mike Rush (incumbent)	15,103	48.92%
Write-in		38	0.12%
Total votes		30,871	100.00%

=== Plymouth and Barnstable ===
Incumbent Democrat Dylan Fernandes is running for re-election and was unopposed in the Democratic primary. Kari MacRae ran unopposed for the Republican nomination.

Democratic primary
Party	Candidate	Votes	%
Democratic	Dylan Fernandes (incumbent)	25,206	99.84%
Write-in		41	0.16%
Total votes		25,247	100.00%

Republican primary
Party	Candidate	Votes	%
Republican	Kari MacRae	10,967	99.13%
Write-in		96	0.87%
Total votes		11,063	100.00%

=== 1st Plymouth and Norfolk ===
Incumbent Republican Patrick O'Connor is running for re-election. No candidates filed to run in the Democratic primary.

Republican primary
Party	Candidate	Votes	%
Republican	Patrick O'Connor (incumbent)	9,876	99.87%
Write-in		13	0.13%
Total votes		9,889	100.00%

=== 2nd Plymouth and Norfolk ===
Incumbent Democrat Michael Brady is running for re-election. No candidates filed to run in the Republican primary.

Democratic primary
Party	Candidate	Votes	%
Democratic	Michael Brady (incumbent)	12,007	99.75%
Write-in		30	0.25%
Total votes		12,037	100.00%

=== 1st Suffolk ===
Incumbent Democrat Nick Collins is running for re-election. He faced a primary challenge in part due to his conflicts with Boston Mayor Michelle Wu over property taxes. Collins was renominated in the Democratic primary. The district covers South Boston. No candidates filed to run in the Republican primary.

==== Democratic primary ====
===== Candidates =====
====== Declared ======
- Nick Collins, incumbent state senator
- Latoya Gayle, community activist
- Juwan Skeens, candidate for this seat in 2024

===== Endorsements =====
Nick Collins (incumbent)

Statewide officials

- Maura Healey, governor of Massachusetts (2023–present)
Latoya Gayle

Local officials

- Michelle Wu, mayor of Boston (2022–present)

Unions

- AFSCME Council 93
- SEIU 32BJ

Political parties

- Working Families Party

Democratic primary
Party	Candidate	Votes	%
Democratic	Nick Collins (incumbent)	11,276	53.87%
Democratic	Latoya Gayle	9,105	43.50%
Democratic	Juwan Skeens	506	2.42%
Write-in		45	0.21%
Total votes		20,932	100.00%

=== 2nd Suffolk ===
Incumbent Democrat Liz Miranda is running for re-election. No candidates filed to run in the Republican primary.

Democratic primary
Party	Candidate	Votes	%
Democratic	Liz Miranda (incumbent)	16,034	99.18%
Write-in		132	0.82%
Total votes		16,166	100.00%

=== 3rd Suffolk ===
Incumbent Democrat Lydia Edwards is running for re-election. No candidates filed to run in the Republican primary.

Democratic primary
Party	Candidate	Votes	%
Democratic	Lydia Edwards (incumbent)	12,420	98.56%
Write-in		181	1.44%
Total votes		12,601	100.00%

=== Suffolk and Middlesex ===
Incumbent Democrat William Brownsberger is running for reelection. He faced a primary challenge in part due to his conflicts with Boston Mayor Michelle Wu over property taxes. Brownsberger was narrowly renominated in the Democratic primary. No candidates filed to run in the Republican primary.

==== Democratic primary ====
===== Candidates =====
====== Declared ======
- William Brownsberger, incumbent state senator
- Daniel Lander, former senior aide to Boston mayor Michelle Wu

===== Endorsements =====
William Brownsberger

Statewide officials

- Maura Healey, governor of Massachusetts (2023–present)
Daniel Lander

U.S. senators

- Elizabeth Warren, Massachusetts (2013-present)

Local officials

- Michelle Wu, mayor of Boston (2022–present)
- Marc McGovern, city councillor and former mayor of Cambridge

Labor unions

- International Brotherhood of Electrical Workers Local 2222

Political parties

- Working Families Party

Democratic primary
Party	Candidate	Votes	%
Democratic	William Brownsberger (incumbent)	12,293	50.03%
Democratic	Daniel Lander	12,258	49.89%
Write-in		18	0.07%
Total votes		24,569	100.00%

=== 1st Worcester ===
Incumbent Democrat Robyn Kennedy is running for re-election. No candidates filed to run in the Republican primary.

Democratic primary
Party	Candidate	Votes	%
Democratic	Robyn Kennedy (incumbent)	13,064	99.33%
Write-in		88	0.67%
Total votes		13,152	100.00%

=== 2nd Worcester ===
Incumbent Democrat Michael O. Moore is running for re-election. No candidates filed to run in the Republican primary.

Democratic primary
Party	Candidate	Votes	%
Democratic	Michael O. Moore (incumbent)	13,038	99.76%
Write-in		32	0.24%
Total votes		13,070	100.00%

=== Worcester and Hampshire ===
Incumbent Republican Peter Durant is running for re-election and was unopposed in the Republican primary. Shannon Teabo ran unopposed for the Democratic nomination.

Republican primary
Party	Candidate	Votes	%
Republican	Peter Durant (incumbent)	9,381	99.42%
Write-in		55	0.58%
Total votes		9,436	100.00%

Democratic primary
Party	Candidate	Votes	%
Democratic	Shannon Teabo	14,881	99.75%
Write-in		38	0.25%
Total votes		14,919	100.00%

=== Worcester and Middlesex ===
Incumbent Democrat John Cronin is running for re-election. No candidates filed to run in the Republican primary.

Democratic primary
Party	Candidate	Votes	%
Democratic	John Cronin (incumbent)	14,955	99.60%
Write-in		60	0.40%
Total votes		15,015	100.00%

=== Worcester and Hampden ===
Incumbent Republican Ryan Fattman is running for re-election. No candidates filed to run in the Democratic primary.

Republican primary
Party	Candidate	Votes	%
Republican	Ryan Fattman (incumbent)	8,870	99.65%
Write-in		31	0.35%
Total votes		8,901	100.00%

== See also ==
- 2027-28 Massachusetts legislature
- 2026 United States elections
- 2026 United States Senate election in Massachusetts
- 2026 United States House of Representatives elections in Massachusetts
- 2026 Massachusetts gubernatorial election
- 2026 Massachusetts Attorney General election
- 2026 Massachusetts Treasurer and Receiver-General election
- 2026 Massachusetts State Auditor election
- 2026 Massachusetts House of Representatives election
- 2023-24 Massachusetts legislature
- 2025-26 Massachusetts legislature
