= 2024 Massachusetts Senate election =

- November 5, 2024

All 40 seats in the Massachusetts Senate 21 seats needed for a majority
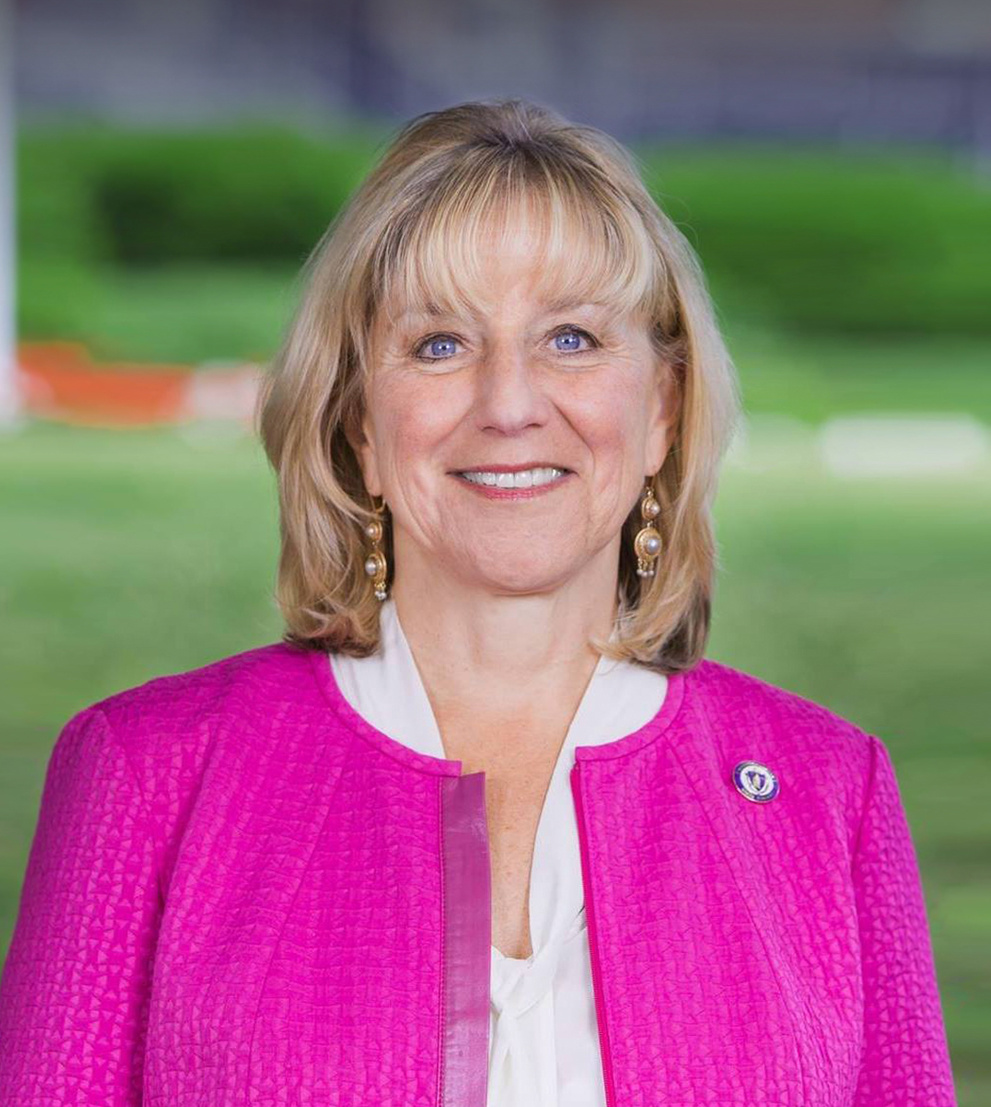

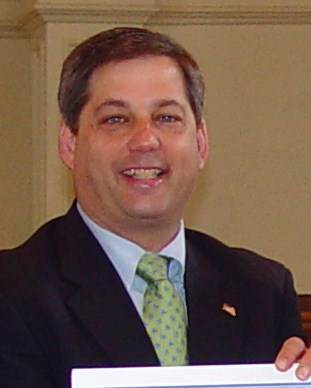
	Majority party	Minority party
Leader	Karen Spilka	Bruce Tarr
Party	Democratic	Republican
Leader since	February 28, 2018	January 3, 2011
Leader's seat	Middlesex and Norfolk	1st Essex and Middlesex
Last election	37 seats	3 seats
Seats before	36	4
Seats won	35	5
Seat change	▼1	▲1
Popular vote	2,194,884	600,698
Percentage	76.80%	21.02%
- Results: Republican gain Democratic hold Republican hold
President before election
Karen Spilka
Democratic
Elected President
Karen Spilka
Democratic

The 2024 Massachusetts State Senate election was held on Tuesday, November 5, 2024, with the primary election held on Tuesday, September 3, 2024. Massachusetts voters elected all 40 members of the State Senate to serve two-year terms in the Massachusetts General Court. The election coincided with United States national elections and Massachusetts state elections, including U.S. Senate, U.S. House, U.S. President, and Massachusetts House.

Democrats started the 2023 legislative session with 37 members. However, Democratic Senator Anne Gobi resigned on June 4, 2023 and Republican Peter Durant won the subsequent special election, flipped the district for his party, and assumed office on November 29, 2023. Therefore, Democrats held a supermajority of 36 seats compared to the four seats held by Republicans. Republicans would have to net 17 seats to flip control of the chamber.

Republicans flipped a second seat on election day, with Kelly Dooner succeeding retiring incumbent Democrat Marc Pacheco. Democrats held their supermajority, winning 35 seats.

== Pre-election special elections ==
=== 2023: Worcester and Hampshire ===
Primary election results
Party	Candidate	Votes	%
Democratic Party primary results
Democratic	Jonathan D. Zlotnik	2,793	98.62%
Write-in		39	1.38%
Total votes		2,832	100.00%
Republican Party primary results
Republican	Peter J. Durant	2,830	60.50%
Republican	Bruce K. Chester	1,840	39.33%
Write-in		8	0.17%
Total votes		4,678	100.00%

General election results
Party	Candidate	Votes	%
Republican	Peter J. Durant	12,646	54.46%
Democratic	Jonathan D. Zlotnik	10,546	45.41%
Write-in		30	0.13%
Total votes		23,222	100.00%
Republican gain from Democratic			

== Retirements ==
Three incumbents did not seek re-election.

=== Democrats ===
1. 3rd Bristol and Plymouth: Marc Pacheco retired.
2. Norfolk, Plymouth and Bristol: Walter Timilty retired to run for Norfolk County Clerk of Courts.
3. Plymouth and Barnstable: Susan Moran retired to run for Barnstable County Clerk of Courts.

== Predictions ==
Due to the size of the Democrats' majority and the low number of competitive seats, most analysts consider a change in control of the chamber to be unlikely.

=== Statewide ===
Source	Ranking	As of
CNalysis	Solid D	October 11, 2024

=== Competitive districts ===
District	Incumbent	Last result	CNalysis (Note: CNalysis has two separate sets of predictions: Classic (Analyst ratings only), and Expanded (Classic alongside recent statewide election results). This table uses the Classic set.) Oct. 11, 2024
Norfolk, Worcester and Middlesex	Rebecca L. Rausch	54.87% D	Very Likely D
3rd Bristol and Plymouth	Marc R. Pacheco	54.29% D	Tilt R
Plymouth and Barnstable	Susan Lynn Moran	56.35% D	Likely D

Republicans won 3 districts that Kamala Harris carried, the 5th district Harris won by less than 0.3%, the 1st by 22.6% and the 30th by 18.5%. Conversely, Democrats won the 13th district that Trump carried by 6.9%.

== Overview ==
=== Election ===
2024 Massachusetts Senate election General election — November 5, 2024
Party	Votes	Percentage	Seats	+/–
Democratic	2,194,884	76.80	35	▼1
Republican	600,698	21.02	5	▲1
Workers Party	22,360	0.78	0	Steady
Independents	7,230	0.25	0	Steady
All Others	32,603	1.14	0	Steady
Valid votes	2,857,775	81.35	—	—
Invalid votes	654,854	18.65	—	—
Totals	3,512,629	100	40	—

== Summary of results by Senate district ==
Italics denote an open seat held by the incumbent party; bold text denotes a gain for a party.

Senate district	Incumbent	Party	Elected Senator	Party
Berkshire, Hampden, Franklin and Hampshire	Paul Mark	Dem	Paul Mark	Dem
Bristol and Norfolk	Paul Feeney	Dem	Paul Feeney	Dem
1st Bristol and Plymouth	Michael Rodrigues	Dem	Michael Rodrigues	Dem
2nd Bristol and Plymouth	Mark Montigny	Dem	Mark Montigny	Dem
3rd Bristol and Plymouth	Marc Pacheco	Dem	**Kelly Dooner**	**Rep**
Cape and Islands	Julian Cyr	Dem	Julian Cyr	Dem
1st Essex	Pavel Payano	Dem	Pavel Payano	Dem
2nd Essex	Joan Lovely	Dem	Joan Lovely	Dem
3rd Essex	Brendan Crighton	Dem	Brendan Crighton	Dem
1st Essex and Middlesex	Bruce Tarr	Rep	Bruce Tarr	Rep
2nd Essex and Middlesex	Barry Finegold	Dem	Barry Finegold	Dem
Hampden	Adam Gomez	Dem	Adam Gomez	Dem
Hampden, Hampshire and Worcester	Jacob Oliveira	Dem	Jacob Oliveira	Dem
Hampden and Hampshire	John Velis	Dem	John Velis	Dem
Hampshire, Franklin and Worcester	Jo Comerford	Dem	Jo Comerford	Dem
1st Middlesex	Edward Kennedy	Dem	Edward Kennedy	Dem
2nd Middlesex	Patricia Jehlen	Dem	Patricia Jehlen	Dem
3rd Middlesex	Michael Barrett	Dem	Michael Barrett	Dem
4th Middlesex	Cindy Friedman	Dem	Cindy Friedman	Dem
5th Middlesex	Jason Lewis	Dem	Jason Lewis	Dem
Norfolk and Middlesex	Cynthia Creem	Dem	Cynthia Creem	Dem
Middlesex and Norfolk	Karen Spilka	Dem	Karen Spilka	Dem
Middlesex and Suffolk	Sal DiDomenico	Dem	Sal DiDomenico	Dem
Middlesex and Worcester	James Eldridge	Dem	James Eldridge	Dem
Norfolk, Plymouth and Bristol	Walter Timilty	Dem	William Driscoll	Dem
Norfolk, Worcester and Middlesex	Rebecca Rausch	Dem	Rebecca Rausch	Dem
Norfolk and Plymouth	John Keenan	Dem	John Keenan	Dem
Norfolk and Suffolk	Michael Rush	Dem	Michael Rush	Dem
Plymouth and Barnstable	Susan Moran	Dem	Dylan Fernandes	Dem
1st Plymouth and Norfolk	Patrick O'Connor	Rep	Patrick O'Connor	Rep
2nd Plymouth and Norfolk	Michael Brady	Dem	Michael Brady	Dem
1st Suffolk	Nicholas Collins	Dem	Nicholas Collins	Dem
2nd Suffolk	Liz Miranda	Dem	Liz Miranda	Dem
3rd Suffolk	Lydia Edwards	Dem	Lydia Edwards	Dem
Suffolk and Middlesex	William Brownsberger	Dem	William Brownsberger	Dem
1st Worcester	Robyn Kennedy	Dem	Robyn Kennedy	Dem
2nd Worcester	Michael Moore	Dem	Michael Moore	Dem
Worcester and Hampshire	Peter Durant (Note: Democratic Senator Anne Gobi resigned on June 4, 2023. Republican Peter Durant won the subsequent special election, flipped the district for his party, and assumed office on November 29, 2023.)	Rep	Peter Durant	Rep
Worcester and Middlesex	John Cronin	Dem	John Cronin	Dem
Worcester and Hampden	Ryan Fattman	Rep	Ryan Fattman	Rep

== Detailed results ==
Sources for election results:

General election results are as reported by the Associated Press.

=== Berkshire, Hampden, Franklin and Hampshire ===
2024 Massachusetts Berkshire, Hampden, Franklin and Hampshire Senate election
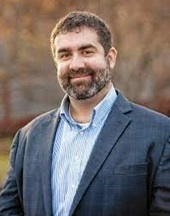

Candidate	Paul Mark	David A. Rosa
Party	Democratic	Republican
Popular vote	61,747	25,448
Percentage	70.81%	29.19%
state senator before election
Paul Mark
Democratic
Elected state senator
Paul Mark
Democratic

The incumbent was Democrat Paul W. Mark, who was first elected in 2022. He ran for re-election.

==== Democratic primary ====
- Paul W. Mark, incumbent state senator

Democratic primary
Party	Candidate	Votes	%
Democratic	Paul W. Mark (incumbent)	17,058	100.00%
Total votes		17,058	100.00%

=== Republican primary ===
- David A. Rosa, perennial candidate

Republican primary
Party	Candidate	Votes	%
Republican	David A. Rosa	3,095	100.00%
Total votes		3,095	100.00%

==== General election ====
General election results
Party	Candidate	Votes	%
Democratic	Paul Mark (incumbent)	61,747	70.81%
Republican	David A. Rosa	25,448	29.19%
Total votes		87,195	100.00%

=== Bristol and Norfolk ===
2024 Massachusetts Bristol and Norfolk Senate election
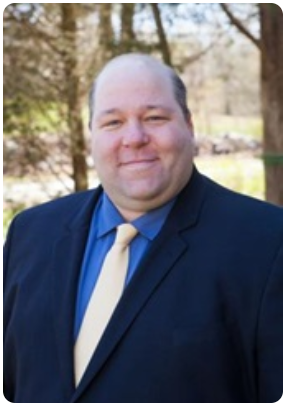

Candidate	Paul Feeney	Laura Saylor
Party	Democratic	Workers Party
Popular vote	60,748	22,360
Percentage	72.97%	27.03%
state senator before election
Paul Feeney
Democratic
Elected state senator
Paul Feeney
Democratic

The incumbent was Democrat Paul R. Feeney, who was first elected in 2016. He ran for re-election.

==== Democratic primary ====
- Paul R. Feeney, incumbent state senator

Democratic primary
Party	Candidate	Votes	%
Democratic	Paul R. Feeney (incumbent)	13,802	100.00%
Total votes		13,802	100.00%

==== Workers Party ====
- Laura Saylor, candidate for this district in 2022

==== General election ====
General election results
Party	Candidate	Votes	%
Democratic	Paul Feeney (incumbent)	60,378	72.97%
Workers Party	Laura Saylor	22,360	27.03%
Total votes		82,738	100%

=== 1st Bristol and Plymouth ===
2024 Massachusetts 1st Bristol and Plymouth Senate election
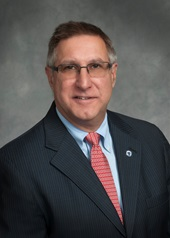
Candidate	Michael J. Rodrigues
Party	Democratic
Incumbent state senator
Michael J. Rodrigues
Democratic

The incumbent was Democrat Michael J. Rodrigues, who was first elected in 2010. He ran for re-election.

=== Democratic primary ===
- Michael J. Rodrigues, incumbent state senator

Democratic primary
Party	Candidate	Votes	%
Democratic	Michael J. Rodrigues (incumbent)	11,151	100.00%
Total votes		11,151	100.00%

==== General election ====
General election results
Party	Candidate	Votes	%
Democratic	Michael J. Rodrigues (incumbent)	55,377	97.6%
Write-in		1,346	2.4%
Total votes		56,723	100%

=== 2nd Bristol and Plymouth ===
2024 Massachusetts 2nd Bristol and Plymouth Senate election
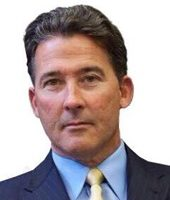
Candidate	Mark C. Montigny
Party	Democratic
Incumbent state senator
Mark C. Montigny
Democratic

The incumbent was Democrat Mark C. Montigny, who was first elected in 1992. He ran for re-election.

=== Democratic primary ===
- Molly Kivi, grant auditor
- Mark C. Montigny, incumbent state senator

Democratic primary
Party	Candidate	Votes	%
Democratic	Mark C. Montigny (incumbent)	8,616	80.21%
Democratic	Molly Kivi	2,126	19.79%
Total votes		10,742	100.00%

==== General election ====
General election results
Party	Candidate	Votes	%
Democratic	Mark C. Montigny (incumbent)	55,918	97.8%
Write-in		1,229	2.2%
Total votes		57,147	100%

=== 3rd Bristol and Plymouth ===
2024 Massachusetts 3rd Bristol and Plymouth Senate election
Candidate	Kelly Dooner	Joseph Richard Pacheco	Jim DuPont
Party	Republican	Democratic	Independent
Incumbent state senator
Marc R. Pacheco
Democratic

The incumbent was Democrat Marc R. Pacheco, who was first elected in 1992. He did not run for re-election.

==== Democratic primary ====
- Joseph Richard Pacheco, Raynham selectman
- Barry Christopher Sanders, social worker

Democratic primary
Party	Candidate	Votes	%
Democratic	Joseph Richard Pacheco	7,779	61.19%
Democratic	Barry Christopher Sanders	4,933	38.81%
Total votes		12,712	100.00%

=== Republican primary ===
- Kelly Dooner, Taunton city councilor

Republican primary
Party	Candidate	Votes	%
Republican	Kelly Dooner	7,182	100.00%
Total votes		7,182	100.00%

==== Independents ====
- Jim DuPont, former Republican Raynham selectman

==== General election ====
General election results
Party	Candidate	Votes	%
Republican	Kelly Dooner	45,251	48.52%
Democratic	Joseph Richard Pacheco	43,355	46.49%
Independent	Jim DuPont	4,647	4.98%
Total votes		93,253	100%

=== Cape and Islands ===
Primary election results
Party	Candidate	Votes	%
Democratic Party primary results
Democratic	Julian Andre Cyr (incumbent)	20,168	100.00%
Total votes		20,168	100.00%
Republican Party primary results
Republican	Christopher Robert Lauzon	8,405	100.00%
Total votes		8,405	100.00%

General election results
Party	Candidate	Votes	%
Democratic	Julian Andre Cyr (incumbent)	63,860	60.82%
Republican	Christopher Robert Lauzon	38,686	36.84%
Unenrolled	Joe van Nes	2,453	2.34%
Total votes		104,999	100%
Democratic hold			

=== 1st Essex ===
Primary election results
Party	Candidate	Votes	%
Democratic Party primary results
Democratic	Pavel M. Payano (incumbent)	7,115	100.00%
Total votes		7,115	100.00%

General election results
Party	Candidate	Votes	%
Democratic	Pavel M. Payano (incumbent)	39,632	96.3%
Write-in		1,515	3.7%
Total votes		41,147	100%

=== 2nd Essex ===
Primary election results
Party	Candidate	Votes	%
Democratic Party primary results
Democratic	Joan B. Lovely (incumbent)	14,724	100.00%
Total votes		14,724	100.00%
Republican Party primary results
Republican	Damian M. Anketell	4,649	100.00%
Total votes		4,649	100.00%

General election results
Party	Candidate	Votes	%
Democratic	Joan B. Lovely (incumbent)	58,109	66.8%
Republican	Damian M. Anketell	28,813	33.1%
Write-in		86	0.1%
Total votes		87,008	100%

=== 3rd Essex ===
Primary election results
Party	Candidate	Votes	%
Democratic Party primary results
Democratic	Brendan P. Crighton (incumbent)	11,524	100.00%
Total votes		11,524	100.00%

General election results
Party	Candidate	Votes	%
Democratic	Brendan P. Crighton (incumbent)	56,430	97.8%
Write-in		1,277	2.2%
Total votes		57,707	100%

=== 1st Essex and Middlesex ===
Primary election results
Party	Candidate	Votes	%
Republican Party primary results
Republican	Bruce E. Tarr (incumbent)	7,197	100.00%
Total votes		7,197	100.00%

General election results
Party	Candidate	Votes	%
Republican	Bruce E. Tarr (incumbent)	88,918	98.8%
Write-in		1,112	1.2%
Total votes		90,030	100%

=== 2nd Essex and Middlesex ===
Primary election results
Party	Candidate	Votes	%
Democratic Party primary results
Democratic	Barry R. Finegold (incumbent)	13,416	100.00%
Total votes		13,416	100.00%

General election results
Party	Candidate	Votes	%
Democratic	Barry R. Finegold (incumbent)	73,764	98.4%
Write-in		1,208	1.6%
Total votes		74,972	100%

=== Hampden ===
Primary election results
Party	Candidate	Votes	%
Democratic Party primary results
Democratic	Adam Gomez (incumbent)	7,236	70.62%
Democratic	Malo L. Brown	3,011	29.38%
Total votes		10,247	100.00%

General election results
Party	Candidate	Votes	%
Democratic	Adam Gomez (incumbent)	43,211	97%
Write-in		1,340	3%
Total votes		44,551	100%

=== Hampden, Hampshire and Worcester ===
Primary election results
Party	Candidate	Votes	%
Democratic Party primary results
Democratic	Jacob R. Oliveira (incumbent)	13,107	100.00%
Total votes		13,107	100.00%

General election results
Party	Candidate	Votes	%
Democratic	Jacob R. Oliveira (incumbent)	68,420	98%
Write-in		1,380	2%
Total votes		69,800	100%

=== Hampden and Hampshire ===
Primary election results
Party	Candidate	Votes	%
Democratic Party primary results
Democratic	John C. Velis (incumbent)	11,129	100.08%
Total votes		11,129	100.00%

General election results
Party	Candidate	Votes	%
Democratic	John C. Velis (incumbent)	62,335	98.7%
Write-in		831	1.3%
Total votes		63,166	100%

=== Hampshire, Franklin and Worcester ===
Primary election results
Party	Candidate	Votes	%
Democratic Party primary results
Democratic	Jo Comerford (incumbent)	15,447	100.00%
Total votes		15,447	100.00%

General election results
Party	Candidate	Votes	%
Democratic	Jo Comerford (incumbent)	67,078	98.5%
Write-in		988	1.5%
Total votes		68,066	100%

=== 1st Middlesex ===
Primary election results
Party	Candidate	Votes	%
Democratic Party primary results
Democratic	Edward J. Kennedy, Jr (incumbent)	10,222	100.00%
Total votes		10,222	100.00%
Republican Party primary results
Republican	Karla J. Miller	3,827	100.00%
Total votes		3,827	100.00%

General election results
Party	Candidate	Votes	%
Democratic	Edward J. Kennedy, Jr (incumbent)	40,887	63.4%
Republican	Karla J. Miller	23,422	36.3%
Write-in		147	0.2%
Total votes		64,456	100%

=== 2nd Middlesex ===
Primary election results
Party	Candidate	Votes	%
Democratic Party primary results
Democratic	Patricia D. Jehlen (incumbent)	22,105	100.00%
Total votes		22,105	100.00%

General election results
Party	Candidate	Votes	%
Democratic	Patricia D. Jehlen (incumbent)	72,232	98.4%
Write-in		1,183	1.6%
Total votes		73,415	100%

=== 3rd Middlesex ===
Primary election results
Party	Candidate	Votes	%
Democratic Party primary results
Democratic	Michael J. Barrett (incumbent)	17,433	100.00%
Total votes		17,433	100.00%

General election results
Party	Candidate	Votes	%
Democratic	Michael J. Barrett (incumbent)	65,186	99.2%
Write-in		496	0.8%
Total votes		65,682	100%

=== 4th Middlesex ===
Primary election results
Party	Candidate	Votes	%
Democratic Party primary results
Democratic	Cindy F. Friedman (incumbent)	17,808	100.00%
Total votes		17,808	100.00%

General election results
Party	Candidate	Votes	%
Democratic	Cindy F. Friedman (incumbent)	70,460	98.3%
Write-in		1,235	1.7%
Total votes		71,695	100%

=== 5th Middlesex ===
Primary election results
Party	Candidate	Votes	%
Democratic Party primary results
Democratic	Jason M. Lewis (incumbent)	14,762	100.00%
Total votes		14,762	100.00%

General election results
Party	Candidate	Votes	%
Democratic	Jason M. Lewis (incumbent)	63,221	98.4%
Write-in		1,043	1.6%
Total votes		64,264	100%

=== Norfolk and Middlesex ===
Primary election results
Party	Candidate	Votes	%
Democratic Party primary results
Democratic	Cynthia Stone Creem (incumbent)	20,442	100.00%
Total votes		20,442	100.00%

General election results
Party	Candidate	Votes	%
Democratic	Cynthia Stone Creem (incumbent)	68,002	98.7%
Write-in		924	1.3%
Total votes		68,926	100%

=== Middlesex and Norfolk ===
Primary election results
Party	Candidate	Votes	%
Democratic Party primary results
Democratic	Karen E. Spilka (incumbent)	17,526	100.00%
Total votes		17,526	100.00%

General election results
Party	Candidate	Votes	%
Democratic	Karen E. Spilka (incumbent)	68,762	98.3%
Write-in		1,223	1.7%
Total votes		69,985	100%

=== Middlesex and Suffolk ===
Primary election results
Party	Candidate	Votes	%
Democratic Party primary results
Democratic	Sal N. DiDomenico (incumbent)	11,432	100.00%
Total votes		11,432	100.00%

General election results
Party	Candidate	Votes	%
Democratic	Sal N. DiDomenico (incumbent)	47,113	98.5%
Write-in		736	1.5%
Total votes		47,849	100%

=== Middlesex and Worcester ===
Primary election results
Party	Candidate	Votes	%
Democratic Party primary results
Democratic	James B. Eldridge (incumbent)	16,585	100.00%
Total votes		16,585	100.00%

General election results
Party	Candidate	Votes	%
Democratic	James B. Eldridge (incumbent)	75,178	98.8%
Write-in		927	1.2%
Total votes		76,105	100%

=== Norfolk, Plymouth and Bristol ===
Primary election results
Party	Candidate	Votes	%
Democratic Party primary results
Democratic	William J. Driscoll Jr.	7,425	45.24%
Democratic	Erin G. Bradley	10,732	32.49%
Democratic	Kathleen Crogan-Camara	7,002	22.26%
Total votes		16,412	100.00%
Republican Party primary results
Republican	Steven David Fruzzetti (Note: The candidate ran a write-in campaign in this election.)	101	100.00%
Total votes		101	100.00%

General election results
Party	Candidate	Votes	%
Democratic	William J. Driscoll Jr.	63,145	98.4%
Write-in		1,010	1.6%
Total votes		64,155	100%

=== Norfolk, Worcester and Middlesex ===
Primary election results
Party	Candidate	Votes	%
Democratic Party primary results
Democratic	Rebecca L. Rausch (incumbent)	15,391	100.00%
Total votes		15,391	100.00%
Republican Party primary results
Republican	Dashe M. Videira	1,066	100.00%
Total votes		1,066	100.00%

General election results
Party	Candidate	Votes	%
Democratic	Rebecca L. Rausch (incumbent)	57,309	58.8%
Republican	Dashe M. Videira	39,983	41%
Write-in		184	0.2%
Total votes		97,476	100%

=== Norfolk and Plymouth ===
Primary election results
Party	Candidate	Votes	%
Democratic Party primary results
Democratic	John F. Keenan (incumbent)	12,827	100.00%
Total votes		12,827	100.00%

General election results
Party	Candidate	Votes	%
Democratic	John F. Keenan (incumbent)	61,091	97.9%
Write-in		1,325	2.1%
Total votes		62,416	100%

=== Norfolk and Suffolk ===
Primary election results
Party	Candidate	Votes	%
Democratic Party primary results
Democratic	Michael F. Rush (incumbent)	17,070	100.00%
Total votes		17,070	100.00%

General election results
Party	Candidate	Votes	%
Democratic	Michael F. Rush (incumbent)	72,352	98.2%
Write-in		1,289	1.8%
Total votes		73,641	100%

=== Plymouth and Barnstable ===
Primary election results
Party	Candidate	Votes	%
Democratic Party primary results
Democratic	Dylan Fernandes	19,831	100.00%
Total votes		19,831	100.00%
Republican Party primary results
Republican	Matt Muratore	7,005	50.14%
Republican	Kari Macrae	6,966	49.68%
Total votes		14,021	100.00%

General election results
Party	Candidate	Votes	%
Democratic	Dylan Fernandes	59,137	51.2%
Republican	Matt Muratore	56,335	48.7%
Write-in		107	0.1%
Total votes		115,579	100%

=== 1st Plymouth and Norfolk ===
Primary election results
Party	Candidate	Votes	%
Republican Party primary results
Republican	Patrick O'Connor (incumbent)	8,061	100.00%
Total votes		8,061	100.00%

General election results
Party	Candidate	Votes	%
Republican	Patrick O'Connor (incumbent)	82,720	98.9%
Write-in		935	1.1%
Total votes		83,655	100%

=== 2nd Plymouth and Norfolk ===
Primary election results
Party	Candidate	Votes	%
Democratic Party primary results
Democratic	Michael D. Brady (incumbent)	10,006	100.00%
Total votes		10,006	100.00%

General election results
Party	Candidate	Votes	%
Democratic	Michael D. Brady (incumbent)	55,766	99.1%
Write-in		487	0.9%
Total votes		56,253	100%

=== 1st Suffolk ===
Primary election results
Party	Candidate	Votes	%
Democratic Party primary results
Democratic	Nicholas P. Collins (incumbent)	10,386	78.81%
Democratic	Juwan Khiry Skeens	2,792	21.19%
Total votes		13,178	100.00%

General election results
Party	Candidate	Votes	%
Democratic	Nicholas P. Collins (incumbent)	61,127	97.7%
Write-in		1,437	2.3%
Total votes		62,564	100%

=== 2nd Suffolk ===
Primary election results
Party	Candidate	Votes	%
Democratic Party primary results
Democratic	Liz Miranda (incumbent)	12,970	100.00%
Total votes		12,970	100.00%

General election results
Party	Candidate	Votes	%
Democratic	Liz Miranda (incumbent)	52,072	98.3%
Write-in		897	1.7%
Total votes		52,969	100%

=== 3rd Suffolk ===
Primary election results
Party	Candidate	Votes	%
Democratic Party primary results
Democratic	Lydia Marie Edwards (incumbent)	9,346	100.00%
Total votes		9,346	100.00%
Republican Party primary results
Republican	Jeannamarie Tamas	1,817	100.00%
Total votes		1,817	100.00%

General election results
Party	Candidate	Votes	%
Democratic	Lydia Marie Edwards (incumbent)	41,690	69.9%
Republican	Jeannamarie Tamas	17,681	29.6%
Write-in		281	0.5%
Total votes		59,652	100%

=== Suffolk and Middlesex ===
Primary election results
Party	Candidate	Votes	%
Democratic Party primary results
Democratic	William N. Brownsberger (incumbent)	14,027	100.00%
Total votes		14,027	100.00%

General election results
Party	Candidate	Votes	%
Democratic	William N. Brownsberger (incumbent)	56,815	98.8%
Write-in		685	1.2%
Total votes		57,500	100%

=== 1st Worcester ===
Primary election results
Party	Candidate	Votes	%
Democratic Party primary results
Democratic	Robyn K. Kennedy (incumbent)	9,078	100.00%
Total votes		9,078	100.00%

General election results
Party	Candidate	Votes	%
Democratic	Robyn K. Kennedy (incumbent)	49,613	97%
Write-in		1,531	3%
Total votes		51,144	100%

=== 2nd Worcester ===
Primary election results
Party	Candidate	Votes	%
Democratic Party primary results
Democratic	Michael O. Moore (incumbent)	9,522	100.00%
Total votes		9,522	100.00%

General election results
Party	Candidate	Votes	%
Democratic	Michael O. Moore (incumbent)	59,686	98.3%
Write-in		1,052	1.7%
Total votes		60,738	100%

=== Worcester and Hampshire ===
Primary election results
Party	Candidate	Votes	%
Republican Party primary results
Republican	Peter J. Durant (incumbent)	7,488	100.00%
Total votes		7,488	100.00%
Democratic Party primary results
Democratic	Sheila H. Dibb	1,003	100.00%
Total votes		1,003	100.00%

General election results
Party	Candidate	Votes	%
Republican	Peter J. Durant (incumbent)	52,465	58.3%
Democratic	Sheila H. Dibb	37,346	41.5%
Write-in		160	0.2%
Total votes		89,971	100%

=== Worcester and Middlesex ===
Primary election results
Party	Candidate	Votes	%
Democratic Party primary results
Democratic	John J. Cronin (incumbent)	11,214	100.00%
Total votes		11,214	100.00%
Republican Party primary results
Republican	Nicholas A. Pirro, III	5,747	100.00%
Total votes		5,747	100.00%

General election results
Party	Candidate	Votes	%
Democratic	John J. Cronin (incumbent)	52,465	58.3%
Republican	Nicholas A. Pirro, III	37,346	41.5%
Write-in		160	0.2%
Total votes		89,971	100%

=== Worcester and Hampden ===
Primary election results
Party	Candidate	Votes	%
Republican Party primary results
Republican	Ryan C. Fattman (incumbent)	8,099	100.00%
Total votes		8,099	100.00%
Democratic Party primary results
Democratic	Anthony Allard	9,677	100.00%
Total votes		9,677	100.00%

General election results
Party	Candidate	Votes	%
Republican	Ryan C. Fattman (incumbent)	65,438	65.8%
Democratic	Anthony Allard	33,911	34.1%
Write-in		153	0.2%
Total votes		99,502	100%

== See also ==
- 2025–2026 Massachusetts legislature
- 2024 United States elections
- 2024 United States presidential election in Massachusetts
- 2024 United States Senate election in Massachusetts
- 2024 United States House of Representatives elections in Massachusetts
- 2024 Massachusetts House of Representatives election
- 2021–2022 Massachusetts legislature
- 2023–2024 Massachusetts legislature
