= 2025–2026 Massachusetts legislature =

194th Massachusetts General Court

194th Massachusetts General Court
←	193rd	195th	→

Overview
- Legislative body: Massachusetts General Court
- Term: January 1, 2025 – January 2027

Massachusetts Senate
- Members: 40
- Senate President: Karen Spilka (D)
- Senate Minority Leader: Bruce Tarr (R)

Massachusetts House of Representatives
- Members: 160
- House Speaker: Ron Mariano (D)
- House Minority Leader: Brad Jones (R)

The 194th Massachusetts General Court is the current meeting of the legislative branch of the state government of Massachusetts in the United States. The legislature consists of elected members of the Senate and House of Representatives. It convened in Boston at the State House on January 1, 2025 and is expected to continue through the end of December 2026, during the third and fourth years of the governorship of Maura Healey. Senate and House districts are drawn based on the 2020 census.

== Major events ==
- January 1, 2025: General Court convened. Ron Mariano (D) was elected Speaker of the House and Karen Spilka was elected President of the Massachusetts Senate. Members-elect of the Massachusetts Senate and the Massachusetts House of Representatives were sworn in, except for Jerry Parisella, who declined to be seated after he was nominated and confirmed as an associate justice of the District Court.

== Leadership ==
=== Senate ===
Position	Leader	District	Party
President of the Senate	Karen E. Spilka	Middlesex and Norfolk	Democratic
Majority Leader	Cynthia Stone Creem	Norfolk and Middlesex	Democratic
President Pro Tempore	William N. Brownsberger	Suffolk and Middlesex	Democratic
Assistant Majority Leader	Joan Lovely	Second Essex	Democratic
Assistant Majority Leader	Michael J. Barrett	Third Middlesex	Democratic
Assistant Majority Leader	Sal N. DiDomenico	Middlesex and Suffolk	Democratic
Senate Majority Whip	Michael F. Rush	Norfolk and Suffolk	Democratic
Assistant Majority Whip	Julian Cyr	Cape and Islands	Democratic
Minority Leader	Bruce E. Tarr	First Essex and Middlesex	Republican
Assistant Minority Leader	Patrick M. O'Connor	First Plymouth and Norfolk	Republican
Assistant Minority Leader	Ryan C. Fattman	Worcester and Norfolk	Republican
Assistant Minority Leader	Peter Durant	Worcester and Hampshire	Republican
Assistant Minority Leader	Kelly Dooner	Third Bristol and Plymouth	Republican

=== House ===
Position	Representative	Municipality	Party
Speaker of the House	Ron Mariano	Quincy	Democratic
Majority Leader	Michael J. Moran	Brighton	Democratic
Speaker Pro Tempore	Kate Hogan	Stow	Democratic
Assistant Majority Leader	Alice Peisch	Wellesley	Democratic
Second Assistant Majority Leader	Frank A. Moran	Lawrence	Democratic
Second Assistant Majority Leader	Paul Donato	Medford	Democratic
First Division Chair	Danielle Gregoire	Marlborough	Democratic
Second Division Chair	Jeffrey Roy	Franklin	Democratic
Third Division Chair	Carlos González	Springfield	Democratic
Fourth Division Chair	Jim O'Day	West Boylston	Democratic
Minority Leader	Bradley H. Jones, Jr.	North Reading	Republican
First Assistant Minority Leader	Kimberly N. Ferguson	Holden	Republican
Second Assistant Minority Leader	Paul K. Frost	Auburn	Republican
Third Assistant Minority Leader	David Muradian	Grafton	Republican
Third Assistant Minority Leader	David Vieira	East Falmouth	Republican

== Current members ==
=== Senators ===
District	No.	Name	Start	Party
Berkshire, Hampden, Franklin and Hampshire		Paul Mark	January 4, 2023	Democratic
Bristol and Norfolk		Paul Feeney	November 1, 2017	Democratic
Bristol and Plymouth	1	Michael Rodrigues	January 5, 2011	Democratic
Bristol and Plymouth	2	Mark Montigny	January 6, 1993	Democratic
Bristol and Plymouth	3	Kelly Dooner	January 1, 2025	Republican
Cape and Islands		Julian Cyr	January 4, 2017	Democratic
Essex	1	Pavel Payano	January 4, 2023	Democratic
Essex	2	Joan Lovely	January 2, 2013	Democratic
Essex	3	Brendan Crighton	March 7, 2018	Democratic
Essex and Middlesex	1	Bruce Tarr	January 3, 1995	Republican
Essex and Middlesex	2	Barry Finegold	January 2, 2019	Democratic
Hampden and Hampshire		John Velis	May 28, 2020	Democratic
Hampshire		Adam Gomez	January 6, 2021	Democratic
Hampshire, Franklin and Worcester		Jo Comerford	January 2, 2019	Democratic
Middlesex	1	Vanna Howard	March 18, 2026	Democratic
Middlesex	2	Patricia Jehlen	October 12, 2005	Democratic
Middlesex	3	Michael Barrett	January 2, 2013	Democratic
Middlesex	4	Cindy Friedman	July 27, 2017	Democratic
Middlesex	5	Jason Lewis	April 16, 2014	Democratic
Middlesex and Norfolk		Karen Spilka	January 5, 2005	Democratic
Middlesex and Suffolk		Sal DiDomenico	May 20, 2010	Democratic
Middlesex and Worcester		James Eldridge	January 7, 2009	Democratic
Norfolk and Middlesex		Cynthia Creem	January 6, 1999	Democratic
Norfolk and Plymouth		John Keenan	January 5, 2011	Democratic
Norfolk, Plymouth and Bristol		William Driscoll	January 1, 2025	Democratic
Norfolk and Suffolk		Mike Rush	January 5, 2011	Democratic
Norfolk, Worcester and Middlesex		Rebecca Rausch	January 2, 2019	Democratic
Plymouth and Barnstable		Dylan Fernandes	January 1, 2025	Democratic
Plymouth and Norfolk	1	Patrick O'Connor	May 18, 2016	Republican
Plymouth and Norfolk	2	Michael Brady	November 3, 2015	Democratic
Suffolk	1	Nick Collins	May 9, 2018	Democratic
Suffolk	2	Liz Miranda	January 5, 2023	Democratic
Suffolk	3	Lydia Edwards	January 20, 2022	Democratic
Suffolk and Middlesex		Will Brownsberger	January 24, 2012	Democratic
Worcester	1	Robyn Kennedy	January 4, 2023	Democratic
Worcester	2	Michael Moore	January 7, 2009	Democratic
Worcester and Hampden		Ryan Fattman	January 7, 2015	Republican
Worcester and Hampshire		Peter Durant	November 29, 2023	Republican
Worcester and Middlesex		John Cronin	January 6, 2021	Democratic

=== Representatives ===
District	No.	Representative	Party
Barnstable	1	Christopher Flanagan	Democratic
Barnstable	2	Kip Diggs	Democratic
Barnstable	3	David Vieira	Republican
Barnstable	4	Hadley Luddy	Democratic
Barnstable	5	Steven Xiarhos	Republican
Barnstable, Dukes and Nantucket		Thomas Moakley	Democratic
Berkshire	1	John Barrett	Democratic
Berkshire	2	Tricia Farley-Bouvier	Democratic
Berkshire	3	Leigh Davis	Democratic
Bristol	1	Michael Chaisson	Republican
Bristol	2	James Hawkins	Democratic
Bristol	3	Lisa Field	Democratic
Bristol	4	Steven Howitt	Republican
Bristol	5	Justin Thurber	Republican
Bristol	6	Carole Fiola	Democratic
Bristol	7	Alan Silvia	Democratic
Bristol	8	Steven Ouellette	Democratic
Bristol	9	Christopher Markey	Democratic
Bristol	10	Mark Sylvia	Democratic
Bristol	11	Christopher Hendricks	Democratic
Bristol	12	Norman Orrall	Republican
Bristol	13	Antonio Cabral	Democratic
Bristol	14	Adam Scanlon	Democratic
Essex	1	Dawne Shand	Democratic
Essex	2	Kristin Kassner	Democratic
Essex	3	Andres Vargas	Democratic
Essex	4	Estela Reyes	Democratic
Essex	5	Andrew Tarr	Democratic
Essex	6	Hannah Bowen	Democratic
Essex	7	Manny Cruz	Democratic
Essex	8	Jennifer Balinsky Armini	Democratic
Essex	9	Donald Wong	Republican
Essex	10	Daniel Cahill	Democratic
Essex	11	Sean Reid	Democratic
Essex	12	Thomas Walsh	Democratic
Essex	13	Sally Kerans	Democratic
Essex	14	Adrianne Ramos	Democratic
Essex	15	Ryan Hamilton	Democratic
Essex	16	Francisco Paulino	Democratic
Essex	17	Frank Moran	Democratic
Essex	18	Tram Nguyen	Democratic
Franklin	1	Vacant	
Franklin	2	Susannah Whipps	Unenrolled
Hampden	1	Todd Smola	Republican
Hampden	2	Brian Ashe	Democratic
Hampden	3	Nicholas Boldyga	Republican
Hampden	4	Kelly Pease	Republican
Hampden	5	Patricia Duffy	Democratic
Hampden	6	Michael Finn	Democratic
Hampden	7	Aaron Saunders	Democratic
Hampden	8	Shirley Arriaga	Democratic
Hampden	9	Orlando Ramos	Democratic
Hampden	10	Carlos González	Democratic
Hampden	11	Bud Williams	Democratic
Hampden	12	Angelo Puppolo	Democratic
Hampshire	1	Lindsay Sabadosa	Democratic
Hampshire	2	Homar Gomez	Democratic
Hampshire	3	Mindy Domb	Democratic
Middlesex	1	Margaret Scarsdale	Democratic
Middlesex	2	James Arciero	Democratic
Middlesex	3	Kate Hogan	Democratic
Middlesex	4	Danielle Gregoire	Democratic
Middlesex	5	David Linsky	Democratic
Middlesex	6	Priscila Sousa	Democratic
Middlesex	7	Jack Lewis	Democratic
Middlesex	8	James Arena-DeRosa	Democratic
Middlesex	9	Thomas Stanley	Democratic
Middlesex	10	John Lawn	Democratic
Middlesex	11	Amy Sangiolo	Democratic
Middlesex	12	Greg Schwartz	Democratic
Middlesex	13	Carmine Gentile	Democratic
Middlesex	14	Simon Cataldo	Democratic
Middlesex	15	Michelle Ciccolo	Democratic
Middlesex	16	Vacant	
Middlesex	17	Vacant	
Middlesex	18	Tara Hong	Democratic
Middlesex	19	David Robertson	Democratic
Middlesex	20	Bradley Jones	Republican
Middlesex	21	Kenneth Gordon	Democratic
Middlesex	22	Marc Lombardo	Republican
Middlesex	23	Sean Garballey	Democratic
Middlesex	24	David Rogers	Democratic
Middlesex	25	Marjorie Decker	Democratic
Middlesex	26	Mike Connolly	Democratic
Middlesex	27	Erika Uyterhoeven	Democratic
Middlesex	28	Joseph McGonagle	Democratic
Middlesex	29	Steven Owens	Democratic
Middlesex	30	Richard Haggerty	Democratic
Middlesex	31	Michael Day	Democratic
Middlesex	32	Kate Lipper-Garabedian	Democratic
Middlesex	33	Steven Ultrino	Democratic
Middlesex	34	Christine Barber	Democratic
Middlesex	35	Paul Donato	Democratic
Middlesex	36	Colleen Garry	Democratic
Middlesex	37	Danillo Sena	Democratic
Norfolk	1	Bruce Ayers	Democratic
Norfolk	2	Tackey Chan	Democratic
Norfolk	3	Ronald Mariano	Democratic
Norfolk	4	James Murphy	Democratic
Norfolk	5	Mark Cusack	Democratic
Norfolk	6	William Galvin	Democratic
Norfolk	7	Richard Wells	Democratic
Norfolk	8	Edward Philips	Democratic
Norfolk	9	Marcus Vaughn	Republican
Norfolk	10	Jeffrey Roy	Democratic
Norfolk	11	Paul McMurtry	Democratic
Norfolk	12	John Rogers	Democratic
Norfolk	13	Joshua Tarsky	Democratic
Norfolk	14	Alice Peisch	Democratic
Norfolk	15	Tommy Vitolo	Democratic
Plymouth	1	Michelle Badger	Democratic
Plymouth	2	John Gaskey	Republican
Plymouth	3	Joan Meschino	Democratic
Plymouth	4	Patrick Kearney	Democratic
Plymouth	5	David DeCoste	Republican
Plymouth	6	Kenneth Sweezey	Republican
Plymouth	7	Alyson Sullivan-Almeida	Republican
Plymouth	8	Dennis Gallagher	Democratic
Plymouth	9	Bridget Plouffe	Democratic
Plymouth	10	Michelle DuBois	Democratic
Plymouth	11	Rita Mendes	Democratic
Plymouth	12	Kathleen LaNatra	Democratic
Suffolk	1	Adrian Madaro	Democratic
Suffolk	2	Daniel Ryan	Democratic
Suffolk	3	Aaron Michlewitz	Democratic
Suffolk	4	David Biele	Democratic
Suffolk	5	Christopher Worrell	Democratic
Suffolk	6	Russell Holmes	Democratic
Suffolk	7	Chynah Tyler	Democratic
Suffolk	8	Jay Livingstone	Democratic
Suffolk	9	John Moran	Democratic
Suffolk	10	William MacGregor	Democratic
Suffolk	11	Judith Garcia	Democratic
Suffolk	12	Brandy Fluker-Reid	Democratic
Suffolk	13	Daniel Hunt	Democratic
Suffolk	14	Rob Consalvo	Democratic
Suffolk	15	Samantha Montaño	Democratic
Suffolk	16	Jessica Giannino	Democratic
Suffolk	17	Kevin Honan	Democratic
Suffolk	18	Michael Moran	Democratic
Suffolk	19	Jeffrey Turco	Democratic
Worcester	1	Kimberly Ferguson	Republican
Worcester	2	Jonathan Zlotnik	Democratic
Worcester	3	Michael Kushmerek	Democratic
Worcester	4	Natalie Higgins	Democratic
Worcester	5	Donald Berthiaume	Republican
Worcester	6	John Marsi	Republican
Worcester	7	Paul Frost	Republican
Worcester	8	Michael Soter	Republican
Worcester	9	David Muradian	Republican
Worcester	10	Brian Murray	Democratic
Worcester	11	Hannah Kane	Republican
Worcester	12	Meghan Kilcoyne	Democratic
Worcester	13	John Mahoney	Democratic
Worcester	14	James O'Day	Democratic
Worcester	15	Mary Keefe	Democratic
Worcester	16	Daniel Donahue	Democratic
Worcester	17	David LeBoeuf	Democratic
Worcester	18	Joseph McKenna	Republican
Worcester	19	Kate Donaghue	Democratic

== See also ==
- 2024 Massachusetts House of Representatives election
- 2024 Massachusetts Senate election
- 2022 Massachusetts gubernatorial election
- List of Massachusetts General Courts
