= 2022 Massachusetts Senate election =

- November 8, 2022

All 40 seats in the Massachusetts Senate 21 seats needed for a majority
- Registered: 4,884,076 (▲1.48 pp)
- Turnout: 51.42% (▼24.58 pp)
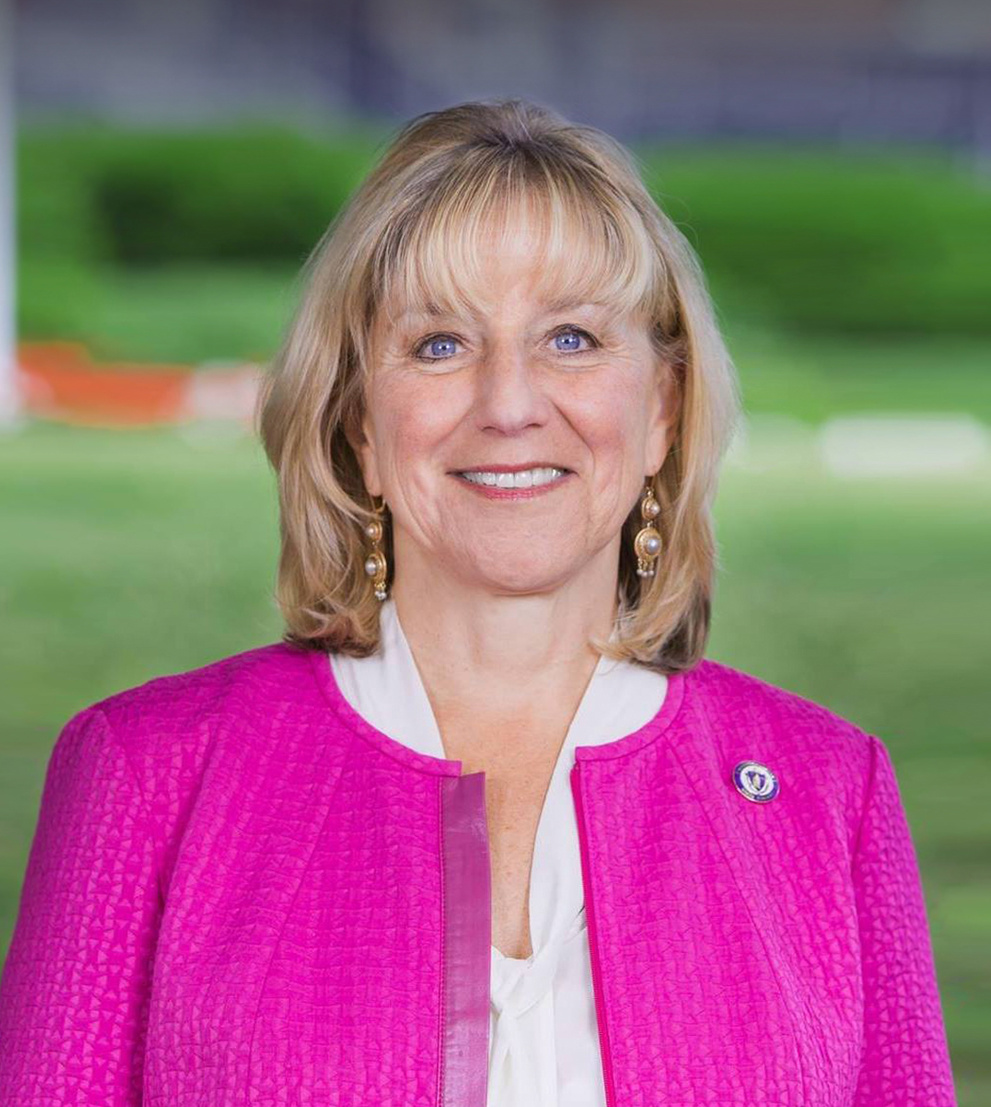

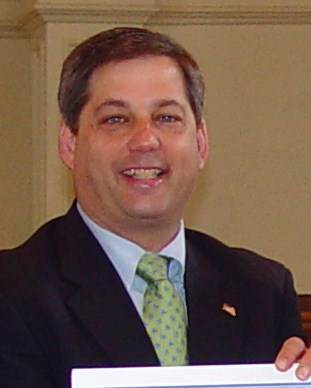
	Majority party	Minority party
Leader	Karen Spilka	Bruce Tarr
Party	Democratic	Republican
Leader since	February 28, 2018	January 3, 2011
Leader's seat	2nd Middlesex and Norfolk	1st Essex and Middlesex
Last election	37 seats	3 seats
Seats won	37	3
Seat change	Steady	Steady
Popular vote	1,539,792	602,112
Percentage	69.24%	27.08%
- Results: Democratic hold Republican hold
President before election
Karen Spilka
Democratic
Elected President
Karen Spilka
Democratic

The 2022 Massachusetts State Senate election was held on Tuesday, November 8, 2022, with the primary election having been held on Tuesday, September 6, 2022. Massachusetts voters selected all 40 members of the State Senate to serve two-year terms in the 2023–2024 Massachusetts legislature. The election coincided with United States national elections and Massachusetts state elections, including U.S. House, Governor, and Massachusetts House.

Democrats maintained their supermajority of 37 out of 40 seats. Simultaneously with gains in the state House, and Maura Healey's win in the gubernatorial race, Democrats won a trifecta in the state for the first time since 2014.

These were the first elections in Massachusetts following the 2020 United States redistricting cycle, which resulted in some members being assigned to new districts.

== Pre-election special elections ==
=== 2022: 1st Suffolk and Middlesex ===
A special election in the 1st Suffolk and Middlesex district was called after Democratic senator Joseph Boncore resigned in September 2021 to take a private sector biotechnology position. The election was won by Democrat Lydia Edwards, a member of the Boston City Council.

==== Democratic primary ====
===== Candidates =====
====== Nominee ======
- Lydia Edwards, Boston city councillor

====== Eliminated in primary ======
- Anthony D'Ambrosio, member of the Revere School Committee

===== Results =====
Democratic primary results
Party	Candidate	Votes	%
Democratic	Lydia Edwards	8,147	60.05%
Democratic	Anthony D'Ambrosio	5,386	39.70%
Write-in		34	0.25%
Total votes		13,567	100.00%

==== General election ====
===== Results =====
General election results
Party	Candidate	Votes	%
Democratic	Lydia Edwards	1,764	94.89%
Write-in		95	5.11%
Total votes		1,859	100.00%
Democratic hold			

== Predictions ==
Source	Ranking	As of
Sabato's Crystal Ball	Safe D	May 19, 2022

== Overview ==
=== Election ===
2022 Massachusetts Senate election General election — November 8, 2022
Party	Votes	Percentage	Seats	+/–
Democratic	1,539,792	69.24	37	Steady
Republican	602,112	27.08	3	Steady
Independents	62,929	2.83	0	Steady
Workers Party	2,168	0.10	0	Steady
All Others	16,743	0.75	0	Steady
Valid votes	2,223,744	88.54	—	—
Invalid votes	287,717	11.46	—	—
Totals	2,511,461	100	40	—
Registered voter/turnout	4,884,076	51.42		

Popular vote
Democratic	69.24%
Republican	27.08%
Independent	2.83%
Other	0.75%

Percentage seats won
Democratic	92.50%
Republican	7.50%

=== Closest races ===
Seats where the margin of victory was under 10%:

1. Norfolk, Worcester & Middlesex District, 9.7%
2. 3rd Bristol & Plymouth District, 8.6%
3. Worcester & Hampshire District, 8.7%

== Summary of results by Senate district ==
Italics denote an open seat held by the incumbent party; bold text denotes a gain for a party.

Senate District	Incumbent	Party	Elected Senator	Party
Berkshire, Hampden, Franklin and Hampshire	Vacant		Paul Mark	Dem
Bristol and Norfolk	Paul Feeney	Dem	Paul Feeney	Dem
1st Bristol and Plymouth	Michael Rodrigues	Dem	Michael Rodrigues	Dem
2nd Bristol and Plymouth	Mark Montigny	Dem	Mark Montigny	Dem
3rd Bristol and Plymouth	Marc Pacheco (Note: Redistricted from 1st Plymouth and Bristol to 3rd Bristol and Plymouth.)	Dem	Marc Pacheco	Dem
Cape and Islands	Julian Cyr	Dem	Julian Cyr	Dem
1st Essex	Diana DiZoglio	Dem	Pavel Payano	Dem
2nd Essex	Joan Lovely	Dem	Joan Lovely	Dem
3rd Essex	Brendan Crighton	Dem	Brendan Crighton	Dem
1st Essex and Middlesex	Bruce Tarr	Rep	Bruce Tarr	Rep
2nd Essex and Middlesex	Barry Finegold	Dem	Barry Finegold	Dem
Hampden	Adam Gomez	Dem	Adam Gomez	Dem
Hampden, Hampshire and Worcester	Eric Lesser (Note: Redistricted from 1st Hampden and Hampshire to Hampden, Hampshire and Worcester.)	Dem	Jacob Oliveira	Dem
Hampden and Hampshire	John Velis (Note: Redistricted from 2nd Hampden and Hampshire to Hampden and Hampshire.)	Dem	John Velis	Dem
Hampshire, Franklin and Worcester	Jo Comerford	Dem	Jo Comerford	Dem
1st Middlesex	Edward J. Kennedy	Dem	Edward J. Kennedy	Dem
2nd Middlesex	Patricia D. Jehlen	Dem	Patricia D. Jehlen	Dem
3rd Middlesex	Michael J. Barrett	Dem	Michael J. Barrett	Dem
4th Middlesex	Cindy Friedman	Dem	Cindy Friedman	Dem
5th Middlesex	Jason Lewis	Dem	Jason Lewis	Dem
Norfolk and Middlesex	Cynthia Stone Creem (Note: Redistricted from 1st Middlesex and Norfolk to Norfolk and Middlesex.)	Dem	Cynthia Stone Creem	Dem
Middlesex and Norfolk	Karen Spilka (Note: Redistricted from 2nd Middlesex and Norfolk to Middlesex and Norfolk.)	Dem	Karen Spilka	Dem
Middlesex and Suffolk	Sal DiDomenico	Dem	Sal DiDomenico	Dem
Middlesex and Worcester	Jamie Eldridge	Dem	Jamie Eldridge	Dem
Norfolk, Plymouth and Bristol	Walter Timilty (Note: Redistricted from Norfolk, Bristol and Plymouth to Norfolk, Plymouth and Bristol.)	Dem	Walter Timilty	Dem
Norfolk, Worcester and Middlesex	Becca Rausch (Note: Redistricted from Norfolk, Bristol and Middlesex to Norfolk, Worcester and Middlesex.)	Dem	Becca Rausch	Dem
Norfolk and Plymouth	John Keenan	Dem	John Keenan	Dem
Norfolk and Suffolk	Mike Rush	Dem	Mike Rush	Dem
Plymouth and Barnstable	Susan Moran	Dem	Susan Moran	Dem
1st Plymouth and Norfolk	Patrick O'Connor (Note: Redistricted from Plymouth and Norfolk to 1st Plymouth and Norfolk.)	Rep	Patrick O'Connor	Rep
2nd Plymouth and Norfolk	Michael Brady (Note: Redistricted from 2nd Plymouth and Bristol to 2nd Plymouth and Norfolk.)	Dem	Michael Brady	Dem
1st Suffolk	Nick Collins	Dem	Nick Collins	Dem
2nd Suffolk	Sonia Chang-Díaz	Dem	Liz Miranda	Dem
3rd Suffolk	Lydia Edwards (Note: Redistricted from 1st Suffolk and Middlesex to 3rd Suffolk.)	Dem	Lydia Edwards	Dem
Suffolk and Middlesex	Will Brownsberger (Note: Redistricted from 2nd Suffolk and Middlesex to Suffolk and Middlesex.)	Dem	Will Brownsberger	Dem
1st Worcester	Harriette L. Chandler	Dem	Robyn Kennedy	Dem
2nd Worcester	Michael O. Moore	Dem	Michael O. Moore	Dem
Worcester and Hampshire	Anne Gobi (Note: Redistricted from Worcester, Hampden, Hampshire and Middlesex to Worcester and Hampshire.)	Dem	Anne Gobi	Dem
Worcester and Middlesex	John J. Cronin	Dem	John J. Cronin	Dem
Worcester and Hampden	Ryan Fattman (Note: Redistricted from Worcester and Norfolk to Worcester and Hampden.)	Rep	Ryan Fattman	Rep

== Detailed Results ==
Sources for election results:

=== Berkshire, Hampden, Franklin and Hampshire ===
Primary Election Results
Party	Candidate	Votes	%
Democratic Party Primary Results
Democratic	Paul W. Mark	22,797	85.64%
Democratic	Huff Tyler Templeton, III	3,824	14.36%
Total votes		26,621	100.00%

General Election Results
Party	Candidate	Votes	%
Democratic	Paul W. Mark	47,989	76.42%
Independent	Brendan M. Phair (Note: The candidate's party was officially listed as "Unenrolled" in Massachusetts election results.)	14,806	23.58%
Total votes		62,795	100.00%
Democratic hold			

=== Bristol and Norfolk ===
Primary Election Results
Party	Candidate	Votes	%
Democratic Party Primary Results
Democratic	Paul R. Feeney (incumbent)	14,698	100.00%
Total votes		14,698	100.00%
Republican Party Primary Results
Republican	Michael Chaisson (Note: The candidate ran a write-in campaign in this election.)	713	100.00%
Total votes		713	100.00%

General Election Results
Party	Candidate	Votes	%
Democratic	Paul R. Feeney (incumbent)	40,353	58.70%
Republican	Michael Chaisson	26,221	38.14%
Workers Party	Laura L. Saylor	2,168	3.15%
Total votes		68,742	100.00%
Democratic hold			

=== 1st Bristol and Plymouth ===
Primary Election Results
Party	Candidate	Votes	%
Democratic Party Primary Results
Democratic	Michael J. Rodrigues (incumbent)	11,909	100.00%
Total votes		11,909	100.00%
Republican Party Primary Results
Republican	Russell T. Protentis	4,789	100.00%
Total votes		4,789	100.00%

General Election Results
Party	Candidate	Votes	%
Democratic	Michael J. Rodrigues (incumbent)	29,420	57.66%
Republican	Russell T. Protentis	21,600	42.34%
Total votes		51,020	100.00%
Democratic hold			

=== 2nd Bristol and Plymouth ===
Primary Election Results
Party	Candidate	Votes	%
Democratic Party Primary Results
Democratic	Mark C. Montigny (incumbent)	12,861	100.00%
Total votes		12,861	100.00%

General Election Results
Party	Candidate	Votes	%
Democratic	Mark C. Montigny (incumbent)	35,193	100.00%
Total votes		35,193	100.00%
Democratic hold			

=== 3rd Bristol and Plymouth ===
Primary Election Results
Party	Candidate	Votes	%
Democratic Party Primary Results
Democratic	Marc R. Pacheco (incumbent)	11,884	100.00%
Total votes		11,884	100.00%
Republican Party Primary Results
Republican	Maria S. Collins	7,005	100.00%
Total votes		7,005	100.00%

General Election Results
Party	Candidate	Votes	%
Democratic	Marc R. Pacheco (incumbent)	35,556	54.29%
Republican	Maria S. Collins	29,937	45.71%
Total votes		65,493	100.00%
Democratic hold			

=== Cape and Islands ===
Primary Election Results
Party	Candidate	Votes	%
Democratic Party Primary Results
Democratic	Julian Andre Cyr (incumbent)	24,454	100.00%
Total votes		24,454	100.00%
Republican Party Primary Results
Republican	Christopher Robert Lauzon	7,344	59.73%
Republican	Daralyn Andrea Heywood	4,951	40.27%
Total votes		12,295	100.00%

General Election Results
Party	Candidate	Votes	%
Democratic	Julian Andre Cyr (incumbent)	54,714	63.70%
Republican	Christopher Robert Lauzon	31,176	36.30%
Total votes		85,890	100.00%
Democratic hold			

=== 1st Essex ===
Primary Election Results
Party	Candidate	Votes	%
Democratic Party Primary Results
Democratic	Pavel M. Payano	5,685	51.29%
Democratic	Eunice Delice Zeigler	4,445	40.10%
Democratic	Doris V. Rodriguez	955	8.62%
Total votes		11,085	100.00%

General Election Results
Party	Candidate	Votes	%
Democratic	Pavel M. Payano	21,591	100.00%
Total votes		21,591	100.00%
Democratic hold			

=== 2nd Essex ===
Primary Election Results
Party	Candidate	Votes	%
Democratic Party Primary Results
Democratic	Joan B. Lovely (incumbent)	17,429	74.84%
Democratic	Kyle Alexander Davis	5,858	25.16%
Total votes		23,287	100.00%
Republican Party Primary Results
Republican	Damian M. Anketell	5,565	100.00%
Total votes		5,565	100.00%

General Election Results
Party	Candidate	Votes	%
Democratic	Joan B. Lovely (incumbent)	44,277	67.72%
Republican	Damian M. Anketell	21,108	32.28%
Total votes		65,385	100.00%
Democratic hold			

=== 3rd Essex ===
Primary Election Results
Party	Candidate	Votes	%
Democratic Party Primary Results
Democratic	Brendan P. Crighton (incumbent)	15,269	100.00%
Total votes		15,269	100.00%

General Election Results
Party	Candidate	Votes	%
Democratic	Brendan P. Crighton (incumbent)	34,620	71.34%
Independent	Annalisa Salustri	13,910	28.66%
Total votes		48,530	100.00%
Democratic hold			

=== 1st Essex and Middlesex ===
Primary Election Results
Party	Candidate	Votes	%
Republican Party Primary Results
Republican	Bruce E. Tarr (incumbent)	9,498	100.00%
Total votes		9,498	100.00%

General Election Results
Party	Candidate	Votes	%
Republican	Bruce E. Tarr (incumbent)	58,838	71.54%
Independent	Terence William Cudney	23,408	28.46%
Total votes		82,246	100.00%
Republican hold			

=== 2nd Essex and Middlesex ===
Primary Election Results
Party	Candidate	Votes	%
Democratic Party Primary Results
Democratic	Barry R. Finegold (incumbent)	16,641	100.00%
Total votes		16,641	100.00%
Republican Party Primary Results
Republican	SalvatorE Paul Defranco	8,090	100.00%
Total votes		8,090	100.00%

General Election Results
Party	Candidate	Votes	%
Democratic	Barry R. Finegold (incumbent)	42,932	57.35%
Republican	SalvatorE Paul Defranco	31,926	42.65%
Total votes		74,858	100.00%
Democratic hold			

=== Hampden ===
Primary Election Results
Party	Candidate	Votes	%
Democratic Party Primary Results
Democratic	Adam Gomez (incumbent)	8,980	100.00%
Total votes		8,980	100.00%

General Election Results
Party	Candidate	Votes	%
Democratic	Adam Gomez (incumbent)	23,665	100.00%
Total votes		23,665	100.00%
Democratic hold			

=== Hampden, Hampshire and Worcester ===
Primary Election Results
Party	Candidate	Votes	%
Democratic Party Primary Results
Democratic	Jacob R. Oliveira	12,932	64.97%
Democratic	Sydney R. Levin-Epstein	6,974	35.03%
Total votes		19,906	100.00%
Republican Party Primary Results
Republican	William E. Johnson	6,327	100.00%
Total votes		6,327	100.00%

General Election Results
Party	Candidate	Votes	%
Democratic	Jacob R. Oliveira	37,410	56.31%
Republican	William E. Johnson	29,027	43.69%
Total votes		66,437	100.00%
Democratic hold			

=== Hampden and Hampshire ===
Primary Election Results
Party	Candidate	Votes	%
Democratic Party Primary Results
Democratic	John C. Velis (incumbent)	14,304	100.00%
Total votes		14,304	100.00%
Republican Party Primary Results
Republican	Cecilia P. Calabrese	5,449	100.00%
Total votes		5,449	100.00%

General Election Results
Party	Candidate	Votes	%
Democratic	John C. Velis (incumbent)	37,130	65.70%
Republican	Cecilia P. Calabrese	19,388	34.30%
Total votes		56,518	100.00%
Democratic hold			

=== Hampshire, Franklin and Worcester ===
Primary Election Results
Party	Candidate	Votes	%
Democratic Party Primary Results
Democratic	Jo Comerford (incumbent)	20,513	100.00%
Total votes		20,513	100.00%

General Election Results
Party	Candidate	Votes	%
Democratic	Jo Comerford (incumbent)	51,232	100.00%
Total votes		51,232	100.00%
Democratic hold			

=== 1st Middlesex ===
Primary Election Results
Party	Candidate	Votes	%
Democratic Party Primary Results
Democratic	Edward J. Kennedy, Jr (incumbent)	10,538	100.00%
Total votes		10,538	100.00%

General Election Results
Party	Candidate	Votes	%
Democratic	Edward J. Kennedy, Jr (incumbent)	32,003	100.00%
Total votes		32,003	100.00%
Democratic hold			

=== 2nd Middlesex ===
Primary Election Results
Party	Candidate	Votes	%
Democratic Party Primary Results
Democratic	Patricia D. Jehlen (incumbent)	22,556	100.00%
Total votes		22,556	100.00%

General Election Results
Party	Candidate	Votes	%
Democratic	Patricia D. Jehlen (incumbent)	53,866	100.00%
Total votes		53,866	100.00%
Democratic hold			

=== 3rd Middlesex ===
Primary Election Results
Party	Candidate	Votes	%
Democratic Party Primary Results
Democratic	Michael J. Barrett (incumbent)	20,191	100.00%
Total votes		20,191	100.00%

General Election Results
Party	Candidate	Votes	%
Democratic	Michael J. Barrett (incumbent)	50,728	100.00%
Total votes		50,728	100.00%
Democratic hold			

=== 4th Middlesex ===
Primary Election Results
Party	Candidate	Votes	%
Democratic Party Primary Results
Democratic	Cindy F. Friedman (incumbent)	20,466	100.00%
Total votes		20,466	100.00%

General Election Results
Party	Candidate	Votes	%
Democratic	Cindy F. Friedman (incumbent)	54,112	100.00%
Total votes		54,112	100.00%
Democratic hold			

=== 5th Middlesex ===
Primary Election Results
Party	Candidate	Votes	%
Democratic Party Primary Results
Democratic	Jason M. Lewis (incumbent)	17,817	100.00%
Total votes		17,817	100.00%
Republican Party Primary Results
Republican	Edward F. Dombroski, Jr	5,083	100.00%
Total votes		5,083	100.00%

General Election Results
Party	Candidate	Votes	%
Democratic	Jason M. Lewis (incumbent)	42,130	63.61%
Republican	Edward F. Dombroski, Jr	24,104	36.39%
Total votes		66,234	100.00%
Democratic hold			

=== Norfolk and Middlesex ===
Primary Election Results
Party	Candidate	Votes	%
Democratic Party Primary Results
Democratic	Cynthia Stone Creem (incumbent)	22,453	100.00%
Total votes		22,453	100.00%
Republican Party Primary Results
Republican	Vladislav S. Yanovsky (Note: The candidate did not advance from the primary to the general election.)	81	100.00%
Total votes		81	100.00%

General Election Results
Party	Candidate	Votes	%
Democratic	Cynthia Stone Creem (incumbent)	55,022	100.00%
Total votes		55,022	100.00%
Democratic hold			

=== Middlesex and Norfolk ===
Primary Election Results
Party	Candidate	Votes	%
Democratic Party Primary Results
Democratic	Karen E. Spilka (incumbent)	18,538	100.00%
Total votes		18,538	100.00%

General Election Results
Party	Candidate	Votes	%
Democratic	Karen E. Spilka (incumbent)	52,484	100.00%
Total votes		52,484	100.00%
Democratic hold			

=== Middlesex and Suffolk ===
Primary Election Results
Party	Candidate	Votes	%
Democratic Party Primary Results
Democratic	Sal N. DiDomenico (incumbent)	12,860	100.00%
Total votes		12,860	100.00%

General Election Results
Party	Candidate	Votes	%
Democratic	Sal N. DiDomenico (incumbent)	33,355	100.00%
Total votes		33,355	100.00%
Democratic hold			

=== Middlesex and Worcester ===
Primary Election Results
Party	Candidate	Votes	%
Democratic Party Primary Results
Democratic	James B. Eldridge (incumbent)	19,164	100.00%
Total votes		19,164	100.00%
Republican Party Primary Results
Republican	Anthony Christakis	5,195	100.00%
Total votes		5,195	100.00%

General Election Results
Party	Candidate	Votes	%
Democratic	James B. Eldridge (incumbent)	51,574	70.27%
Republican	Anthony Christakis	21,819	29.73%
Total votes		73,393	100.00%
Democratic hold			

=== Norfolk, Plymouth and Bristol ===
Primary Election Results
Party	Candidate	Votes	%
Democratic Party Primary Results
Democratic	Walter F. Timilty, Jr. (incumbent)	10,732	60.52%
Democratic	Kathleen Crogan-Camara	7,002	39.48%
Total votes		17,734	100.00%
Republican Party Primary Results
Republican	Brian R. Muello	5,313	100.00%
Total votes		5,313	100.00%

General Election Results
Party	Candidate	Votes	%
Democratic	Walter F. Timilty, Jr. (incumbent)	40,311	66.13%
Republican	Brian R. Muello	20,648	33.87%
Total votes		60,959	100.00%
Democratic hold			

=== Norfolk, Worcester and Middlesex ===
Primary Election Results
Party	Candidate	Votes	%
Democratic Party Primary Results
Democratic	Rebecca L. Rausch (incumbent)	16,584	100.00%
Total votes		16,584	100.00%
Republican Party Primary Results
Republican	Shawn C. Dooley	7,263	100.00%
Total votes		7,263	100.00%

General Election Results
Party	Candidate	Votes	%
Democratic	Rebecca L. Rausch (incumbent)	41,893	54.87%
Republican	Shawn C. Dooley	34,452	45.13%
Total votes		76,345	100.00%
Democratic hold			

=== Norfolk and Plymouth ===
Primary Election Results
Party	Candidate	Votes	%
Democratic Party Primary Results
Democratic	John F. Keenan (incumbent)	13,755	100.00%
Total votes		13,755	100.00%
Republican Party Primary Results
Republican	Gary M. Innes	5,842	100.00%
Total votes		5,842	100.00%

General Election Results
Party	Candidate	Votes	%
Democratic	John F. Keenan (incumbent)	36,063	63.66%
Republican	Gary M. Innes	20,586	36.34%
Total votes		56,649	100.00%
Democratic hold			

=== Norfolk and Suffolk ===
Primary Election Results
Party	Candidate	Votes	%
Democratic Party Primary Results
Democratic	Michael F. Rush (incumbent)	20,323	100.00%
Total votes		20,323	100.00%

General Election Results
Party	Candidate	Votes	%
Democratic	Michael F. Rush (incumbent)	54,915	100.00%
Total votes		54,915	100.00%
Democratic hold			

=== Plymouth and Barnstable ===
Primary Election Results
Party	Candidate	Votes	%
Democratic Party Primary Results
Democratic	Susan Lynn Moran (incumbent)	20,356	100.00%
Total votes		20,356	100.00%
Republican Party Primary Results
Republican	Kari Macrae	11,454	100.00%
Total votes		11,454	100.00%

General Election Results
Party	Candidate	Votes	%
Democratic	Susan Lynn Moran (incumbent)	49,686	56.35%
Republican	Kari Macrae	38,493	43.65%
Total votes		88,179	100.00%
Democratic hold			

=== 1st Plymouth and Norfolk ===
Primary Election Results
Party	Candidate	Votes	%
Democratic Party Primary Results
Democratic	Robert William Stephens, Jr	16,510	100.00%
Total votes		16,510	100.00%
Republican Party Primary Results
Republican	Patrick Michael O'Connor (incumbent)	10,126	81.23%
Republican	Ronald J. Patuto	2,340	18.77%
Total votes		12,466	100.00%

General Election Results
Party	Candidate	Votes	%
Republican	Patrick Michael O'Connor (incumbent)	48,668	60.63%
Democratic	Robert William Stephens, Jr	31,609	39.37%
Total votes		80,277	100.00%
Republican hold			

=== 2nd Plymouth and Norfolk ===
Primary Election Results
Party	Candidate	Votes	%
Democratic Party Primary Results
Democratic	Michael D. Brady (incumbent)	8,827	69.57%
Democratic	Katrina M. Huff-Larmond	3,861	30.43%
Total votes		12,688	100.00%
Republican Party Primary Results
Republican	Jim Gordon	4,949	100.00%
Total votes		4,949	100.00%

General Election Results
Party	Candidate	Votes	%
Democratic	Michael D. Brady (incumbent)	29,297	63.70%
Republican	Jim Gordon	16,693	36.30%
Total votes		45,990	100.00%
Democratic hold			

=== 1st Suffolk ===
Primary Election Results
Party	Candidate	Votes	%
Democratic Party Primary Results
Democratic	Nicholas P. Collins (incumbent)	15,455	100.00%
Total votes		15,455	100.00%

General Election Results
Party	Candidate	Votes	%
Democratic	Nicholas P. Collins (incumbent)	41,069	100.00%
Total votes		41,069	100.00%
Democratic hold			

=== 2nd Suffolk ===
Primary Election Results
Party	Candidate	Votes	%
Democratic Party Primary Results
Democratic	Liz Miranda	6,806	33.21%
Democratic	Nika Elugardo	5,600	27.32%
Democratic	Dianne Wilkerson	4,388	21.41%
Democratic	Miniard Culpepper	3,147	15.35%
Democratic	James E. Grant	554	2.70%
Total votes		20,495	100.00%

General Election Results
Party	Candidate	Votes	%
Democratic	Liz Miranda	35,207	100.00%
Total votes		35,207	100.00%
Democratic hold			

=== 3rd Suffolk ===
Primary Election Results
Party	Candidate	Votes	%
Democratic Party Primary Results
Democratic	Lydia Marie Edwards (incumbent)	11,497	100.00%
Total votes		11,497	100.00%

General Election Results
Party	Candidate	Votes	%
Democratic	Lydia Marie Edwards (incumbent)	32,396	100.00%
Total votes		32,396	100.00%
Democratic hold			

=== Suffolk and Middlesex ===
Primary Election Results
Party	Candidate	Votes	%
Democratic Party Primary Results
Democratic	William N. Brownsberger (incumbent)	15,977	100.00%
Total votes		15,977	100.00%

General Election Results
Party	Candidate	Votes	%
Democratic	William N. Brownsberger (incumbent)	42,713	100.00%
Total votes		42,713	100.00%
Democratic hold			

=== 1st Worcester ===
Primary Election Results
Party	Candidate	Votes	%
Democratic Party Primary Results
Democratic	Robyn K. Kennedy	8,082	55.68%
Democratic	Joseph M. Petty	6,434	44.32%
Total votes		14,516	100.00%

General Election Results
Party	Candidate	Votes	%
Democratic	Robyn K. Kennedy	30,138	73.61%
Independent	Lisa K. Mair	10,805	26.39%
Total votes		40,943	100.00%
Democratic hold			

=== 2nd Worcester ===
Primary Election Results
Party	Candidate	Votes	%
Democratic Party Primary Results
Democratic	Michael O. Moore (incumbent)	11,105	100.00%
Total votes		11,105	100.00%

General Election Results
Party	Candidate	Votes	%
Democratic	Michael O. Moore (incumbent)	40,946	100.00%
Total votes		40,946	100.00%
Democratic hold			

=== Worcester and Hampshire ===
Primary Election Results
Party	Candidate	Votes	%
Democratic Party Primary Results
Democratic	Anne M. Gobi (incumbent)	13,044	100.00%
Total votes		13,044	100.00%
Republican Party Primary Results
Republican	James Anthony Amorello	8,149	100.00%
Total votes		8,149	100.00%

General Election Results
Party	Candidate	Votes	%
Democratic	Anne M. Gobi (incumbent)	35,409	54.36%
Republican	James Anthony Amorello	29,734	45.64%
Total votes		65,143	100.00%
Democratic hold			

=== Worcester and Middlesex ===
Primary Election Results
Party	Candidate	Votes	%
Democratic Party Primary Results
Democratic	John J. Cronin (incumbent)	12,569	100.00%
Total votes		12,569	100.00%
Republican Party Primary Results
Republican	Kenneth B. Hoyt	6,889	100.00%
Total votes		6,889	100.00%

General Election Results
Party	Candidate	Votes	%
Democratic	John J. Cronin (incumbent)	36,784	60.28%
Republican	Kenneth B. Hoyt	24,238	39.72%
Total votes		61,022	100.00%
Democratic hold			

=== Worcester and Hampden ===
Primary Election Results
Party	Candidate	Votes	%
Republican Party Primary Results
Republican	Ryan C. Fattman (incumbent)	8,902	100.00%
Total votes		8,902	100.00%

General Election Results
Party	Candidate	Votes	%
Republican	Ryan C. Fattman (incumbent)	53,456	100.00%
Total votes		53,456	100.00%
Republican hold			

== See also ==
- 2020 Massachusetts general election
- 2020 Massachusetts House of Representatives election
- 2019–2020 Massachusetts legislature
- 2021–2022 Massachusetts legislature
