= Thomas Moakley =

American politician

Member of the Massachusetts House of Representatives from the Barnstable, Dukes and Nantucket district
- Incumbent
- Assumed office January 1, 2025
- Preceded by: Dylan Fernandes

Personal details
- Born: Falmouth, Massachusetts
- Party: Democratic
- Education: Georgetown University
- Profession: Prosecutor
- Website: www.thomasmoakley.com

Thomas W. Moakley is an American politician. He serves in the Massachusetts House of Representatives, representing a district containing Dukes County, Nantucket County, and part of Barnstable County.

== Biography ==
Moakley is from Falmouth, Massachusetts and is the great-nephew of Joe Moakley. He earned a bachelor's degree from Georgetown University in 2017, and a J.D. degree from Suffolk University Law School in 2021.

== Career ==
Moakley is a former Cape and Islands Assistant District Attorney, and was assigned to the Edgartown District Court, the Martha's Vineyard Juvenile Court, and the Dukes County Grand Jury.

He was elected to the Massachusetts House of Representatives in 2024.

== Committee Assignments ==
For the 2025-26 Session, Moakley sits on the following committees in the House:

- Joint Committee on the Judiciary
- Joint Committee on Tourism, Arts and Culture
- Joint Committee on Children, Families and Persons with Disabilities
- Joint Committee on Advanced Information Technology, the Internet and Cybersecurity
- House Committee on Federal Funding, Policy and Accountability

== Caucuses ==
Moakley is a member of the following caucuses:

- Coastal Caucus
- Clean Energy Caucus
- LGBTQ Legislative Caucus.

== Electoral record ==
2024 Massachusetts House of Representatives Barnstable, Dukes, and Nantucket District General Election
Party	Candidate	Votes	%
Democratic	Thomas Moakley	21,075	98.9%
	Other/Write-in	240	1.1%
Total votes		21,315	100.0%

2024 Massachusetts House of Representatives Barnstable, Dukes, and Nantucket District Primary Election
Party	Candidate	Votes	%
Democratic	Thomas Moakley	3,523	56.2%
Democratic	Arielle Faria	2,739	43.7%
	Other/Write-in	6	0.1%
Total votes		6,268	100.0%
