= Timothy Madden =

American politician

Member of the Massachusetts House of Representatives from the Barnstable, Dukes and Nantucket district
- In office January 7, 2009 – January 4, 2017
- Preceded by: Eric Turkington
- Succeeded by: Dylan Fernandes

Personal details
- Party: Democratic

Timothy R. Madden was a member of the Massachusetts House of Representatives for the Barnstable, Dukes and Nantucket district. Madden was succeeded by Dylan Fernandes.

Prior to becoming a state representative, Madden served as a Nantucket Selectman, Chairman of the Land Bank Commission, Chairman of the Harbor Planning Committee, Town Meeting Moderator, and as a member of County Commission, Planning & Economic Development Commission, member of the Board of Health, Zoning Board, and Town & County Charter Committee.
