= Susan Moran =

American politician

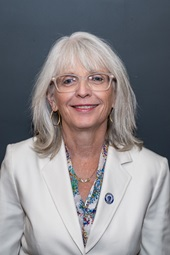

Member of the Massachusetts Senate from the Plymouth and Barnstable district
- In office May 28, 2020 – Jan 01, 2025
- Preceded by: Vinny deMacedo
- Succeeded by: Dylan Fernandes

Personal details
- Born: November 21, 1959 (age 66)
- Party: Democratic
- Education: Stoneham High School
- Alma mater: Tufts University (BA); Suffolk University Law School (JD)
- Website: Legislative website Campaign website

Susan Lynn Moran (born November 21, 1959) is an American politician from Massachusetts. She was previously a member of the Massachusetts Senate for the Plymouth and Barnstable district.

Moran graduated from Tufts University and Suffolk University Law School. She served as a selectman for Falmouth, Massachusetts. She won a special election for the seat on May 19, 2020. She was sworn into office on May 28.

Moran announced that she would not seek re-election during the 2024 Massachusetts Senate elections. She instead ran for Clerk of the Barnstable County Superior Court. She succeeded 23-year incumbent Republican Scott Nickerson in the general election after he declined to seek re-election.

== See also ==
- 2019–2020 Massachusetts legislature
- 2021–2022 Massachusetts legislature
