= William Driscoll =

Massachusetts politician

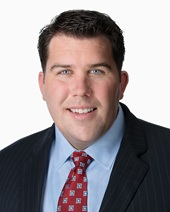

Member of the Massachusetts Senate from the Norfolk, Plymouth and Bristol district
- Incumbent
- Assumed office January 1, 2025
- Preceded by: Walter Timilty

Member of the Massachusetts House of Representatives from the 7th Norfolk District
- In office January 4, 2017 – January 1, 2025
- Preceded by: Timothy Madden
- Succeeded by: Richard Wells

Personal details
- Party: Democratic Party
- Spouse: Beca
- Children: 2 sons
- Education: Boston College, Bachelor of Arts, Communications (2005)

William J. Driscoll, Jr. is an American politician who has represented districts south of Boston first in the Massachusetts House of Representatives and currently the Massachusetts Senate.

== Early life and career ==
He attended St. Agatha School in Milton for grades K-8 (1988-1997) before attending Boston College High School.

For more than a decade prior to becoming State Rep., Bill, worked in the U.S. disaster response and humanitarian aid sector. His last position was Executive Director (2011-2016) of NECHAMA – Jewish Response to Disaster.

== Political career ==
Driscoll was first elected to the Massachusetts House of Representatives in 2016, winning the Democratic primary with 21.3% of the vote against six other candidates and facing no opposition in the general election. He was a full-time legislator. He ran unopposed in all subsequent House elections. He represented the 7th Norfolk District in the Massachusetts House of Representatives. A member of the Democratic Party, his district includes portions of the towns of Milton and Randolph. He served as House Chair of the Joint Committee on Emergency Preparedness and Management.

In 2024, he won the three-way Democratic primary for the Norfolk, Plymouth and Bristol Senate District. He won in the November General Election in an uncontested race.

== See also ==
- 2019–2020 Massachusetts legislature
- 2021–2022 Massachusetts legislature
- 2023–2024 Massachusetts legislature
- 2025–2026 Massachusetts legislature
