= Dylan Fernandes =

American politician (born 1989)

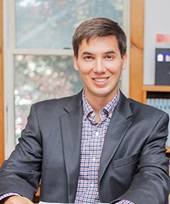

Member of the Massachusetts Senate from the Plymouth and Barnstable district
- Incumbent
- Assumed office January 1, 2025
- Preceded by: Susan Moran

Member of the Massachusetts House of Representatives from the Barnstable, Dukes and Nantucket district
- In office January 4, 2017 – January 1, 2025
- Preceded by: Timothy Madden
- Succeeded by: Thomas Moakley

Personal details
- Born: 1989 (age 36–37)
- Party: Democratic
- Education: College of Charleston (BS); Harvard University (MPA)

Dylan A. Fernandes (born 1989) is an American politician from Massachusetts. He is currently a member of the Massachusetts Senate from the Plymouth and Barnstable district. He is a member of the Democratic Party.

Born in Falmouth, Fernandes graduated from College of Charleston in 2013. He served as the political director for Maura Healey's campaign for attorney general of Massachusetts in 2014. After the election, he worked in the Massachusetts Attorney General's office in civil rights, where he worked on cases combatting discrimination. He ran for office in 2016 in a five-way primary and won by 13 percentage points, then faced a three-way general election, which he also won by 13 percentage points.

== Early life and education ==
Fernandes is a fourth-generation resident of Falmouth, Massachusetts, and grew up in Woods Hole, Massachusetts. He is the son of Tessa Lineaweaver of Woods Hole who owns Flying Pig Pottery and of Mario Fernandes of Falmouth who owns a small landscaping company. Fernandes's paternal great-grandparents came to Massachusetts from the Azores and Puerto Rico. He is of Portuguese, Puerto Rican, and English descent.

Fernandes initially attended American University in Washington, D.C. He transferred to the College of Charleston and graduated there, earning a Bachelor of Science degree and majors in economics and political science. In 2022, he graduated with a Master of Public Administration from the Harvard Kennedy School.

== Early career ==
In 2012, Fernandes worked on Senator Elizabeth Warren's campaign in his native Cape Cod region. Fernandes served as political director for Maura Healey's Attorney General of Massachusetts campaign in 2014. He went on to work as digital director in the attorney general's office. He worked as a mediator in the Civil Rights Division. His work there included founding pro-LGBT rights and women's rights events, including the 'Everyone Welcome' campaign to support the bill for transgender rights.

=== 2016 State Representative election ===
In 2016, Fernandes ran for the Massachusetts House representing precincts 1, 2, 5 and 6, of Falmouth, in Barnstable County; Chilmark, Edgartown, Aquinnah, Gosnold, Oak Bluffs, Tisbury and West Tisbury, all in Dukes County; Nantucket, Nantucket County. Fernandes was endorsed by Democratic Senator Elizabeth Warren. He was elected on November 8, 2016, running only against independents.

Work as a Legislator

In 2017, Fernandes made his maiden speech on combating climate change and compelled the House of Representatives to vote for his bill signing Massachusetts onto the Paris Climate Agreement. The bill passed 146–10.

Over the course of his tenure, Fernandes has passed 30 bills into law including legislation on ocean acidification, electric bicycles, and ensuring project-labor agreements and environmental protection in the offshore wind energy.

Fernandes currently serves as the Vice Chair of the Committee on the Environment and Natural Resources, and has seats on the Committee on Ways and Means, the Committee on Telecommunications, Utilities & Energy, and the Committee on Global Warming and Climate Change.

=== 2024 State Senator election ===
Fernandes won the general election for the Massachusetts State Senate Plymouth and Barnstable District seat against Republican State Representative Mathew Muratore (R-Plymouth) on November 5, 2024. The district covers Bourne, Falmouth, Kingston, Pembroke, Plymouth, and Sandwich. Democrat Susan Moran, the incumbent, did not run for reelection.

== Committee assignments ==
For the 2025-26 Session, Fernandes sits on the following committees in the Senate:

- Agriculture and Fisheries - Chairperson
- Cannabis Policy - Vice Chair
- Environment and Natural Resources - Vice Chair
- Intergovernmental Affairs
- Public Safety and Homeland Security
- Telecommunications, Utilities and Energy
- Transportation

== Caucuses ==
Fernandes is a member of the following caucuses:

- Climate and Coastal Resilience
- Blue Economy
- Affordable Housing

== Task forces and commissions ==
Fernandes is a member of the following task forces and commissions:

- Martha's Vineyard Climate Action Task Force
- Energy Infrastructure Coordination Task Force
- Special Commission on Sentencing Guidelines in Houses of Correction
- Special Commission on School Building Program Equity

=== Electoral history ===
2016 Democratic Primary
Party	Candidate	Vote Percent	Votes
Democrat	Dylan Fernandes (won)	48.40%	3,385
Democrat	T. Ewell Hopkins Jr.	35.09%	2,454
Democrat	Micheal G. Heylin	7.15%	500
Democrat	Timothy M. Soverino	5.13%	359
Democrat	Jessica G. Lambert	4.23%	296

2016 State Representative Seat
Party	Candidate	Vote Percent	Votes
Democrat	Dylan Fernandes (won)	51.71%	13,030
Independent	Tobias Glidden	38.10%	9,601
Independent	Jacob Ferry	10.18%	2,566

2024 State Senator Seat
Party	Candidate	Vote Percent	Votes
Democrat	Dylan Fernandes (won)	51.0%	57,953
Republican	Mathew Moratore	49.0%	55,640

== See also ==
- 2019–2020 Massachusetts legislature
- 2021–2022 Massachusetts legislature
