= Kelly Dooner =

American politician

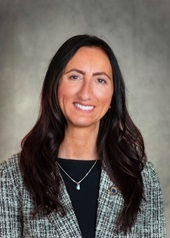

Member of the Massachusetts Senate from the 3rd Bristol and Plymouth district
- Incumbent
- Assumed office January 1, 2025
- Preceded by: Marc Pacheco

Member of the Taunton City Council
- In office 2021–2024

Personal details
- Party: Republican
- Spouse: Louis Picardi
- Education: Boston University

Kelly Dooner (born October 3, 1993) is an American politician and member of the Massachusetts State Senate for the 3rd Bristol and Plymouth district. Dooner previously served as a member of the Taunton City Council, elected in 2021.

== Early life and education ==
Dooner grew up in Randolph, Massachusetts, and attended Norfolk County Agricultural High School. She attended Suffolk University for two years before transferring to Boston University, pursuing a degree in Political Science. She obtained her paralegal certificate from Boston University in 2015. She moved to Taunton around 2015, and worked as a paralegal.

== Political career ==
=== Taunton City Politics ===
In 2021, Dooner was elected to the Taunton City Council, becoming the youngest woman ever to hold the position. During her tenure, she served as the council president and worked to designate Taunton as a Purple Heart City. She also collaborated with Mayor Shaunna O'Connell to double the senior tax credit and addressed the city's financial issues.

In 2023, she was elected to the Taunton Planning Board, serving concurrently on the City Council. She resigned both positions in November 2024, shortly after she was elected to the State Senate.

In 2020, she ran in a special election for a seat in the Massachusetts House of Representatives, but lost with 42% of the vote.

=== Massachusetts State Senate ===
In November 2024, Dooner won election to the 1st Plymouth and Bristol district State Senate seat, turning the seat Republican for the first time in decades. She was also the first Republican woman to win a State Senate seat since 2002. She defeated Democrat and long-term Raynham Selectman Joe Pacheco, and an unenrolled candidate in a tight race. Dooner assumed office on January 1, 2025.

== Political positions ==
Dooner has expressed concerns about the state's spending and policies regarding undocumented migrants. She has criticized the use of hotels as emergency shelters for migrants, advocating for prioritizing housing for military veterans and indignant families who are U.S. citizens. Additionally, she made headlines when she called for audits of the state's Electronic benefit transfer (EBT) card system, saying the state was "handing them out like candy"; she claimed that the (larger) number of cards issued compared to the number of food stamp recipients indicated potential fraud. However, a spokesperson for the Department of Transitional Assistance explained that the number of "active cards" also includes former recipients of aid, and those who have applied but have not been approved. In addition, 200,000 new EBT cards were issued to administer the federally-funded Summer Child Nutrition Program".

== Personal life ==
Dooner lives in Taunton with her husband, Louis Picardi. She works as a paralegal for a Boston law firm.
