= Jacob Oliveira =

American politician

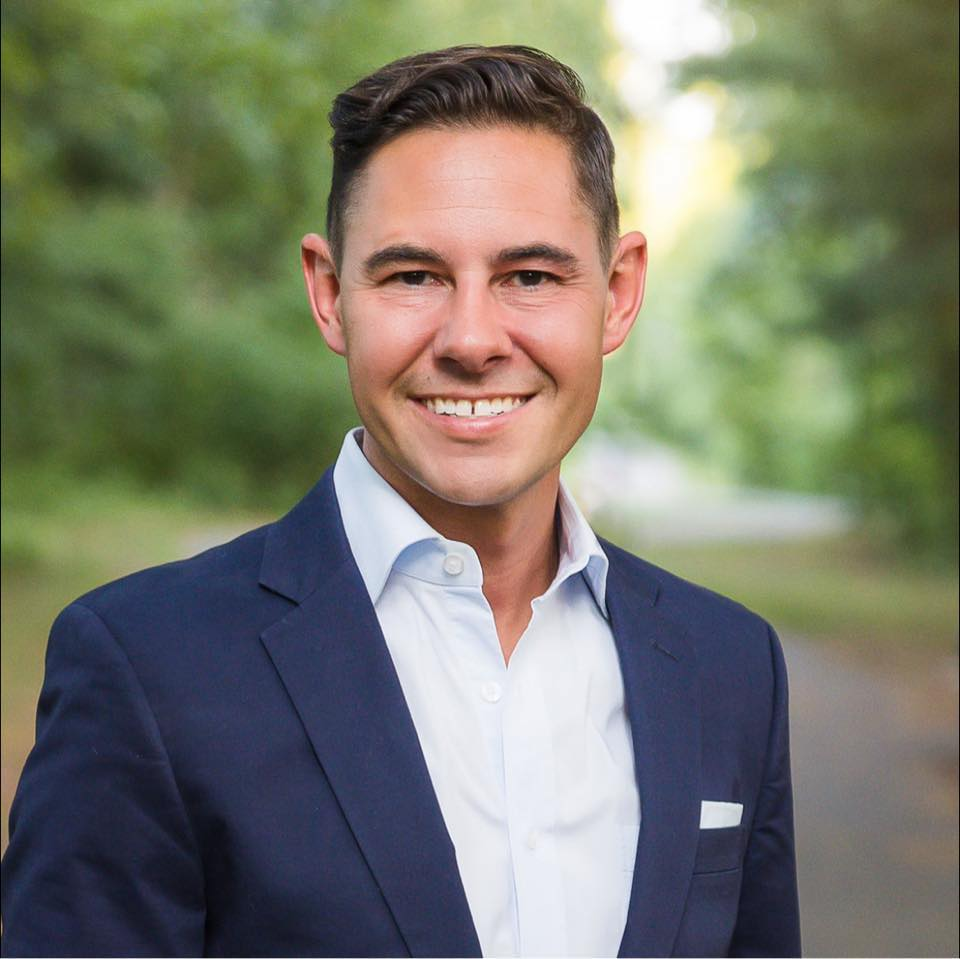

Member of the Massachusetts Senate from the Hampden, Hampshire and Worcester District district
- Incumbent
- Assumed office January 4, 2023
- Preceded by: Eric Lesser

Member of the Massachusetts House of Representatives from the 7th Hampden district
- In office January 6, 2021 – January 4, 2023
- Preceded by: Thomas Petrolati
- Succeeded by: Aaron Saunders

Personal details
- Born: July 6, 1986 (age 40) Holyoke, Massachusetts, U.S.
- Party: Democratic
- Education: Framingham State University (BA)

Jacob R. Oliveira is an American politician serving as a member of the Massachusetts State Senate. Elected in November 2022, he assumed office on January 4, 2023.

== Early life and education ==
Oliveira was born in Holyoke, Massachusetts and raised in nearby Ludlow, a descendant of immigrants from Portugal and Poland. He earned a Bachelor of Arts degree in government from Framingham State University.

== Career ==
Oliveira was elected to the Ludlow School Committee at the age of 22, where he served for 12 years. Through his work on the school committee, Oliveira was elected as the youngest president of the Massachusetts Association of School Committees in 2016. In addition, he served as a member of the National School Boards Association board of directors and a board member of the Lower Pioneer Valley Collaborative that oversees vocational and technical education for Ludlow students.

Prior to being elected to the Massachusetts House of Representatives, Oliveira served as the Assistant Executive Officer of the Massachusetts State Universities Council of Presidents, where he played a key role in renaming seven state colleges to state universities. Earlier in his career, he worked as legislative director for State Senator Michael Rodrigues.

=== Massachusetts Legislature ===
Oliveira represents the Hampden, Hampshire & Worcester District, which includes Ludlow, Belchertown, Granby, Palmer, Warren, Hampden, South Hadley, Longmeadow, East Longmeadow, parts of Springfield, parts of Chicopee, and Wilbraham. Before being elected in 2022, Senator Oliveira served as the state representative for the 7th Hampden district from his hometown in Ludlow.

Jake was elected to the Massachusetts House of Representatives in 2020 and served the 7th Hampden District before being elected to the State Senate in 2022. In the Senate, he is the Chair of the Joint Committee on Labor and Workforce Development and Vice Chair of the Joint Committee on Election Laws.
