= Pavel Payano =

American politician

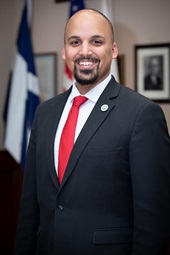

Member of the Massachusetts Senate from the 1st Essex district
- Incumbent
- Assumed office January 4, 2023
- Preceded by: Diana DiZoglio

Member of the Lawrence City Council
- In office 2018–2022

Personal details
- Born: Dominican Republic
- Party: Democratic
- Education: University of Massachusetts Amherst (BA); University of Massachusetts Boston (MS); Suffolk University (JD)

Pavel Payano is an American politician who is a member of the Massachusetts Senate for the 1st Essex district. Elected in November 2022, he assumed office on January 4, 2023.

== Education ==
Payano earned a Bachelor of Arts degree in political science from the University of Massachusetts Amherst, a Master of Science in public affairs from the University of Massachusetts Boston, and a Juris Doctor from the Suffolk University Law School.

== Career ==
In 2006 and 2007, Payano worked as the Massachusetts outreach director for the Democratic National Committee. From 2007 to 2009, he served as a special assistant and immigration specialist for Congresswoman Niki Tsongas. From 2009 to 2011, he served as a benefits eligibility social worker in the Massachusetts Executive Office of Health and Human Services. Payano later worked as a project manager for the University of Massachusetts Lowell and managed Juana Matias's 2016 campaign for the Massachusetts House of Representatives. He was also an adjunct professor at Merrimack College and chaired the Boston chapter of the Association of Latino Professionals For America. Payano served as a member of the Lawrence City Council from 2018 to 2022.
