= Adam Gomez =

American politician

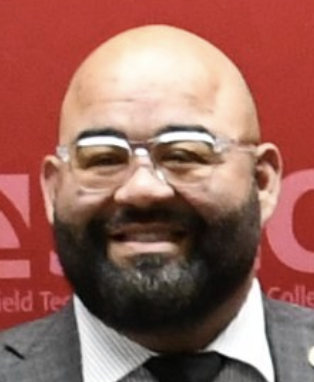
- Gomez in 2026

Member of the Massachusetts Senate from the Hampden district
- Incumbent
- Assumed office January 6, 2021
- Preceded by: James Welch

Personal details
- Born: Massachusetts, U.S.
- Party: Democratic
- Education: Springfield Technical Community College (AA); Westfield State University (BA)

Adam Gomez is an American politician who serves in the Massachusetts Senate representing the Hampden District. Prior to his election in 2020, Gomez previously represented Ward 1 as a councillor on the Springfield City Council, first taking office in January 2016. In January 2020, he was selected as vice president of the council.

During the September 1, 2020, Democratic primary, Gomez defeated incumbent Jim Welch to become the Democratic Party nominee for the Massachusetts State Senator from the Hampden District - encompassing Springfield, West Springfield, and Chicopee. Gomez was elected to the seat during the November 3, 2020, general election while unopposed, becoming the Commonwealth's first state senator of Puerto Rican descent.

Prior to his first election in November 2015, Gomez worked as a community organizer in Springfield. He lives in the Brightwood neighborhood of Springfield, and is affiliated with the Democratic Party.

== See also ==
- 2021–2022 Massachusetts legislature
