= John F. Keenan (politician) =

American politician (born 1964)

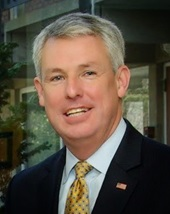

Member of the Massachusetts Senate from the Norfolk and Plymouth district
- Incumbent
- Assumed office January 5, 2011
- Preceded by: Michael W. Morrissey

City Councilor At-Large, Quincy, Massachusetts
- In office 2003–2012

Personal details
- Born: 1964 (age 61–62)
- Party: Democratic
- Spouse: Jeanne Keenan
- Occupation: Legislator
- Website: www.senatorjohnkeenan.com

John F. Keenan (born 1964) is a member of the Massachusetts State Senate for the Norfolk and Plymouth district.

Prior to being elected to the Massachusetts State Senate he served on the Quincy City Council from 2003 to 2012. He finished his term on the Quincy City Council in January 2012 and did not seek re-election. He was sworn in to the State Senate on January 5, 2011, has been re-elected several times, and is now serving his eighth 2 year term.

== Early life, education, and early career ==
John was born the fourth of seven children of Philip and Loretta Keenan. His father worked in the mailing room of the Record American, and then the Boston Herald, while his mother worked at Filene’s department store and then CNA Insurance. John was raised in Quincy and attended the Quincy Public Schools, graduating in 1982 from North Quincy High School. He went to Harvard University, earning his way through by working in the athletic department equipment room. He also worked the Saturday overnight shift at the Herald. John graduated with honors from Harvard in 1986, with a government concentration. Three years later, he graduated from Suffolk University Law School. A lifelong learner, John attended the Harvard Kennedy School as a Rappaport/Boston Urban Scholar, graduating in 2019 with a Master's Degree in Public Administration.

After law school, John worked first as a litigator, then as a public defender, followed by work as an attorney combating insurance fraud. He is admitted to practice in all Massachusetts State Courts, the Federal District Court for the District of Massachusetts, the Federal First Circuit Court of Appeals, and the United States Supreme Court.

While in law school, John was appointed to serve as the Chairperson of the Quincy Mayor’s Commission on Handicapped Affairs, and was then appointed to the Quincy Zoning Board of Appeals, on which he served for seven years. In 1997 he was appointed Executive Secretary in the administration of Quincy Mayor Jim Sheets. As Executive Secretary he managed 22 municipal department heads and was responsible for the preparation and presentation of Quincy’s budget and the review of all financial matters. In 2001, John became Executive Director of the Norfolk County Retirement System, a public pension system with approximately 10,000 active and retired members, and assets of over $500 million.

== Quincy City Council ==
In 2003, John was appointed to the Quincy City Council to fill a vacant seat, and was elected Councilor at Large in 2004. He was re-elected Councilor at Large four times, the last time as the highest vote getter. He served as Chairman of the Council’s Finance Committee for eight years.

== Massachusetts State Senate ==
=== 2010 elections ===
In 2010, John F. Keenan ran for the Massachusetts State Senate, for the Norfolk and Plymouth district. He beat a Democratic Party primary challenger, Arthur Steven Tobin, with 9,539 to Tobin's 8,146, well over 55% of the vote. In the general election, Keenan defeated Republican Daniel M. Dewey and Independent Laura Innis, 29,982 votes to 18,582 for Dewey and 5,152 for Innis.

=== 2012 elections ===
In 2012, Keenan, running for reelection, was unopposed in the Democratic primary, receiving all 5,309 votes cast. In the general election, he was unopposed, but garnered about 75% of the vote, with over 16,000 blank votes being submitted. His second term began in January, 2013.

=== 2014 election ===
In 2014, Keenan faced Republican challenger Les Gosule. A resident of Quincy, Massachusetts who is the father of a murder victim and one of the 'Three Strikes Activists', who worked over a decade to pass "Melissa’s Law" since his daughter Melissa Gosule was murdered in 1999. On November 4, 2014, Senator Keenan won reelection to a third term which started in January 2015.

2016, 2018, 2020, 2022 and 2024 Elections

John was re-elected to the State Senate in 2016, 2018, and 2020, each time challenged by Alexander Mendez. He was challenged in the 2022 election by Republican Gary Innes of Hanover and received 64% of the vote. He was unopposed in the 2024 election.

=== Tenure ===
Since being elected to the Senate, John has served as the Senate Chair of the Joint Committee on Mental Health and Substance Abuse, the Senate Chair of the Joint Committee on Public Health, the Chair of the Senate Committee on Bonding, Capital Expenditures and State Assets, and as Chair of the Senate Committee on Post Audit and Oversight. In the 2021-2022 session, John serves as the Senate Chair of the Joint Committee on Housing and as Vice-Chair of the Joint Committee on Transportation.

Throughout his legislative career, John's policy focus has been on substance use, mental health, and other public health issues, as well as transportation and housing.

In the areas of drug policy, behavioral health, and public health, John has collaborated closely with public and behavioral health advocates producing impactful legislation and policies, with many becoming national models. For instance, he drafted and introduced legislation known as Chapter 55, a data collection model that has helped inform drug policy in Massachusetts. The Institute for Excellence in Government calls it, “a model of data-driven and interdisciplinary resolve with results that have begun to turn the tide.” The Massachusetts Medical Association has recognized it as, “the first of its kind in the country . . . generating breakthrough findings on the manifestations of opioid use disorder.” Also, in 2019 John was the Senate sponsor of Chapter 133 of the Acts of 2019, An Act Modernizing Tobacco Control, first in the nation legislation banning all flavored e-cigarette/vaping products and all flavored tobacco products in Massachusetts. The Wall Street Journal called it the “U.S.’s toughest flavored-tobacco ban.”

== Personal life ==
John is married with three children. He is a member of the Merrymount Association, the Ward One Democratic Committee, the Quincy City Club, Friends of the Thomas Crane Public Library, and the Harvard Club of Quincy. He served for seven years as a member of the Quincy Zoning Board of Appeals, and also coached in the Sacred Heart Youth Basketball Program for several years.

Keenan is also a practicing Catholic.

== See also ==
- 2019–2020 Massachusetts legislature
- 2021–2022 Massachusetts legislature
