= Robyn Kennedy =

American politician

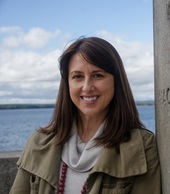

Member of the Massachusetts Senate from the 1st Worcester district
- Incumbent
- Assumed office January 4, 2023
- Preceded by: Harriette L. Chandler

Personal details
- Born: Worcester, Massachusetts, U.S.
- Party: Democratic
- Education: Assumption University (BA); Clark University (MPA)

Robyn Kennedy is an American politician who is a member of the Massachusetts Senate for the 1st Worcester district. Elected in November 2022, she assumed office on January 4, 2023.

== Early life and education ==
Born and raised in Worcester, Massachusetts, Kennedy graduated from Holy Name High School. She earned a Bachelor of Arts degree from Assumption University in 2003 and a Master of Public Administration from Clark University in 2021.

== Career ==
From 2005 to 2007, Kennedy served as a legislative aide for State Senator Edward M. Augustus Jr. In 2007 and 2008, she was the deputy director of appointments for Governor Deval Patrick. From 2008 to 2013, she served as deputy chief of staff in the office of Lieutenant Governor Tim Murray. From 2013 to 2016, she served as deputy secretary of the Massachusetts Executive Office of Health and Human Services. Since 2017, she has been the associate executive director of the YWCA of Central Massachusetts. She was elected to the Massachusetts Senate in November 2022.
