= Jo Comerford =

Massachusetts politician

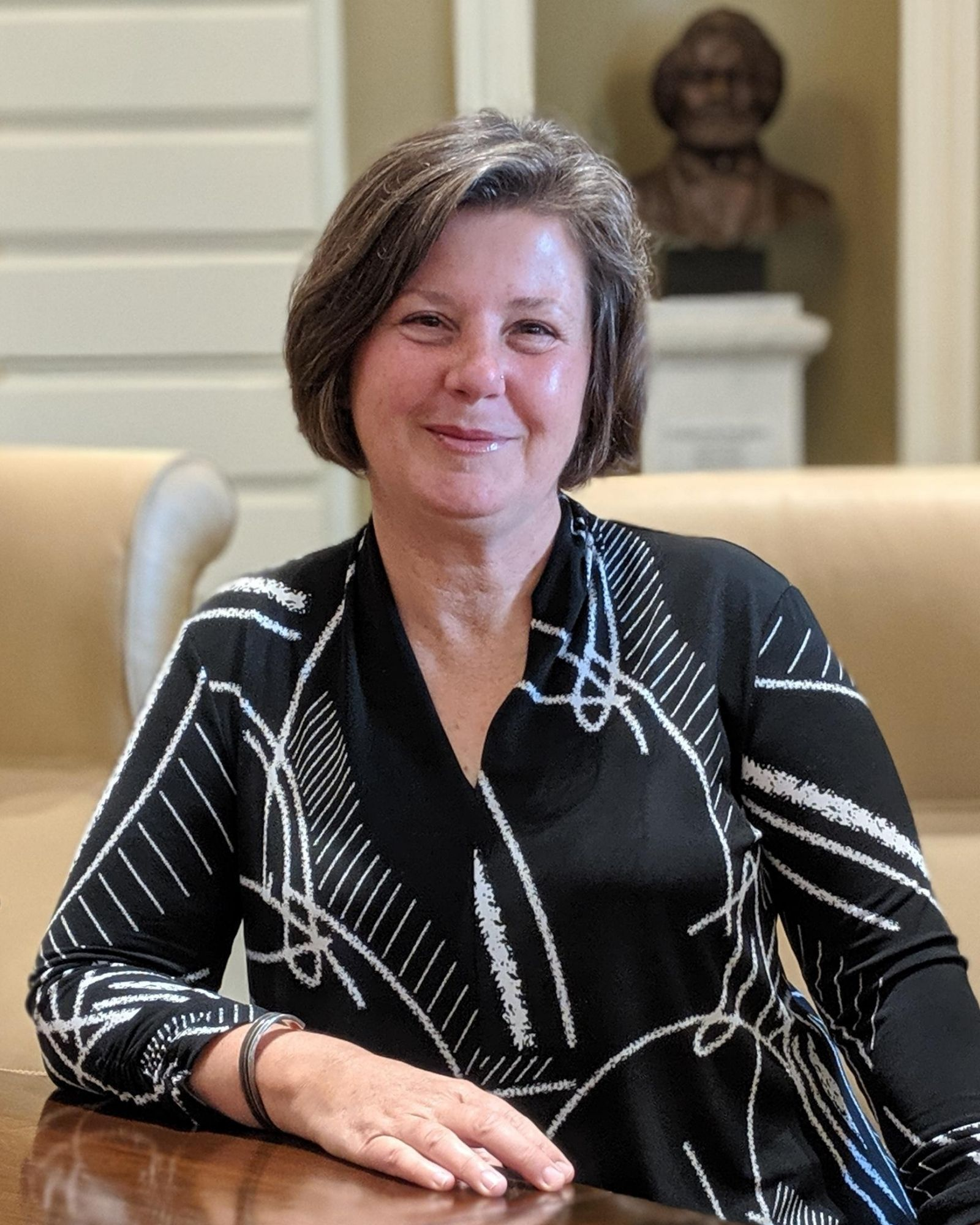

Member of the Massachusetts Senate from the Hampshire, Franklin and Worcester district
- Incumbent
- Assumed office January 2, 2019
- Preceded by: Stan Rosenberg

Personal details
- Born: September 3, 1963 (age 62)
- Party: Democratic

Joanne M. Comerford (born September 3, 1963) is an American politician who currently serves in the Massachusetts Senate. She is the first woman to hold the seat. Before being elected senator she had worked for the National Priorities Project, the Center for Human Development, the American Friends Service Committee, The Food Bank of Western Massachusetts and MoveOn.

Comerford won her first race, a primary election for state senate, entirely on write-in votes. The long-time incumbent senator for her district resigned abruptly in May 2018 in the face of an ethics scandal, after the filing deadline for potential challengers. After an energized grassroots campaign that mobilized over 650 registered volunteers and adopted the rallying cry "Go With Jo," 14,196 voters wrote in Comerford as their preferred candidate, defeating the only candidate whose name was printed on the ballot and two other write-in candidates.

The Massachusetts Women’s Political Caucus endorsed Comerford as an incumbent candidate in the 2020 Massachusetts general election.

In 2021, Comerford was appointed as the Massachusetts state senate's leader of a COVID-19 working group, helping to provide oversight of the state’s pandemic response. She has advocated for full funding for public schools, turning Massachusetts into a zero emissions state, health care reform, revenue equity, a police reform bill that passed the Legislature in 2020, and work on bringing rail to the western part of the state, among other priorities. In 2021, she filed a bill to establish a five-year moratorium on the construction of new prisons and jails in the commonwealth, in partnership with Representative Chynah Tyler.

She is married to Ann Hennessey, a public school teacher who represented Ward 5 on the Northampton School Committee.

== See also ==
- 2019–2020 Massachusetts legislature
- 2021–2022 Massachusetts legislature
