= Massachusetts Senate's Plymouth and Barnstable district =

American legislative district

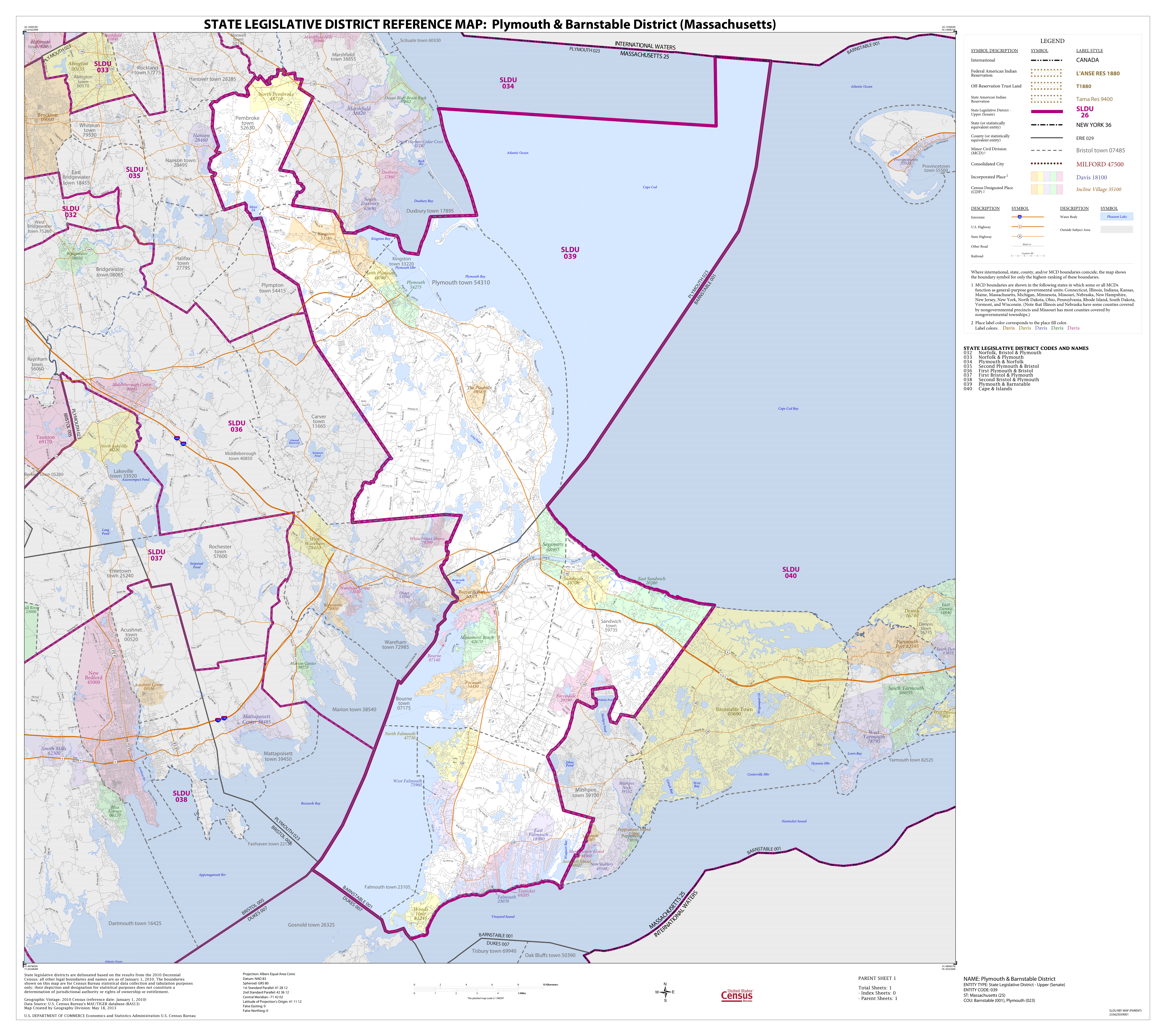
Map of Massachusetts Senate's Plymouth and Barnstable district, based on the 2010 United States census.

Massachusetts Senate's Plymouth and Barnstable district in the United States is one of 40 legislative districts of the Massachusetts Senate. It covers 33.3% of Barnstable County and 17.6% of Plymouth County population. As of January 2025, it is represented by Democrat Dylan Fernandes.

== Towns represented ==
The district includes the following localities:

- Bourne
- Falmouth
- Kingston
- Mashpee
- Pembroke
- Plymouth
- Plympton
- Sandwich

== Senators ==
- Edward Kirby, circa 1991
- Therese Murray, circa 1993-2015
- Vinny M. deMacedo, 2015-2019
- Susan L. Moran, 2020-2025
- Dylan Fernandes, 2025-present

== Images ==
Portraits of legislators

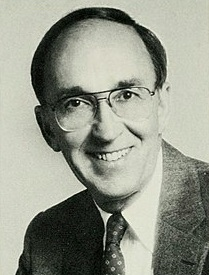
Edward Kirby

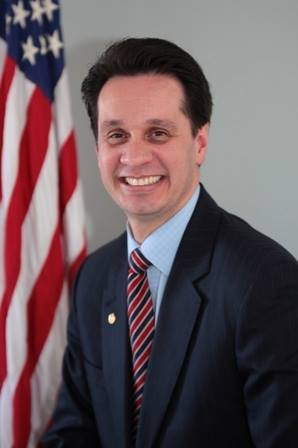
Vinny deMacedo

== See also ==
- List of Massachusetts Senate elections
- Barnstable County districts of the Massachusetts House of Representatives: 1st, 2nd, 3rd, 4th, 5th; Barnstable, Dukes and Nantucket
- Plymouth County districts of the Massachusetts House of Representatives: 1st, 2nd, 3rd, 4th, 5th, 6th, 7th, 8th, 9th, 10th, 11th, 12th
- List of Massachusetts General Courts
- List of former districts of the Massachusetts Senate
