= Paul Mark =

American politician

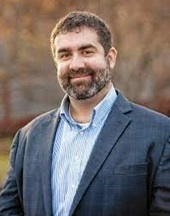

Member of the Massachusetts Senate from the Berkshire, Hampshire, Franklin, and Hampden district
- Incumbent
- Assumed office January 4, 2023
- Preceded by: Adam G. Hinds

Member of the Massachusetts House of Representatives from the 2nd Berkshire district
- In office January 5, 2011 – January 4, 2023
- Preceded by: Denis Guyer
- Succeeded by: Tricia Farley-Bouvier

Personal details
- Party: Democratic
- Occupation: Politician
- Website: votepaulmark.com

Paul W. Mark is an American politician serving as a Democratic member of the Massachusetts Senate. He represents the Berkshire, Hampden, Franklin and Hampshire District, which includes 57 cities and towns throughout Berkshire, Franklin, Hampden, and Hampshire counties. Paul Mark previously served in the Massachusetts House of Representatives.

Before running for office, Mark was employed for over ten years as a splice-service technician at Verizon Communications. He earned several college degrees at night and on the weekends while working full-time and commuting across Massachusetts. Mark holds an associate degree in telecommunications from Springfield Technical Community College, a bachelor's degree in economics and finance from Southern New Hampshire University, a master's degree in labor relations studies from the University of Massachusetts Amherst, a Juris Doctor degree from Suffolk University Law School, and a doctorate in law and policy from Northeastern University. Mark has been admitted to practice as an attorney in Massachusetts since 2009. Mark is also a member of the International Brotherhood of Electrical Workers and has held many positions in the local union including steward, political director, press secretary, and executive board member. Mark was named the 2010 Berkshire Central Labor Council Person of the Year.

Mark announced his candidacy for the Massachusetts State Senate in the Berkshire, Hampshire, Franklin, and Hampden district on October 18, 2021. Former Senator Adam G. Hinds ran for Lieutenant Governor and did not seek reelection to the Senate.

== See also ==
- 2019–2020 Massachusetts legislature
- 2021–2022 Massachusetts legislature
