= 2014 Massachusetts Senate election =

- November 4, 2014

All 40 seats in the Massachusetts Senate 21 seats needed for a majority
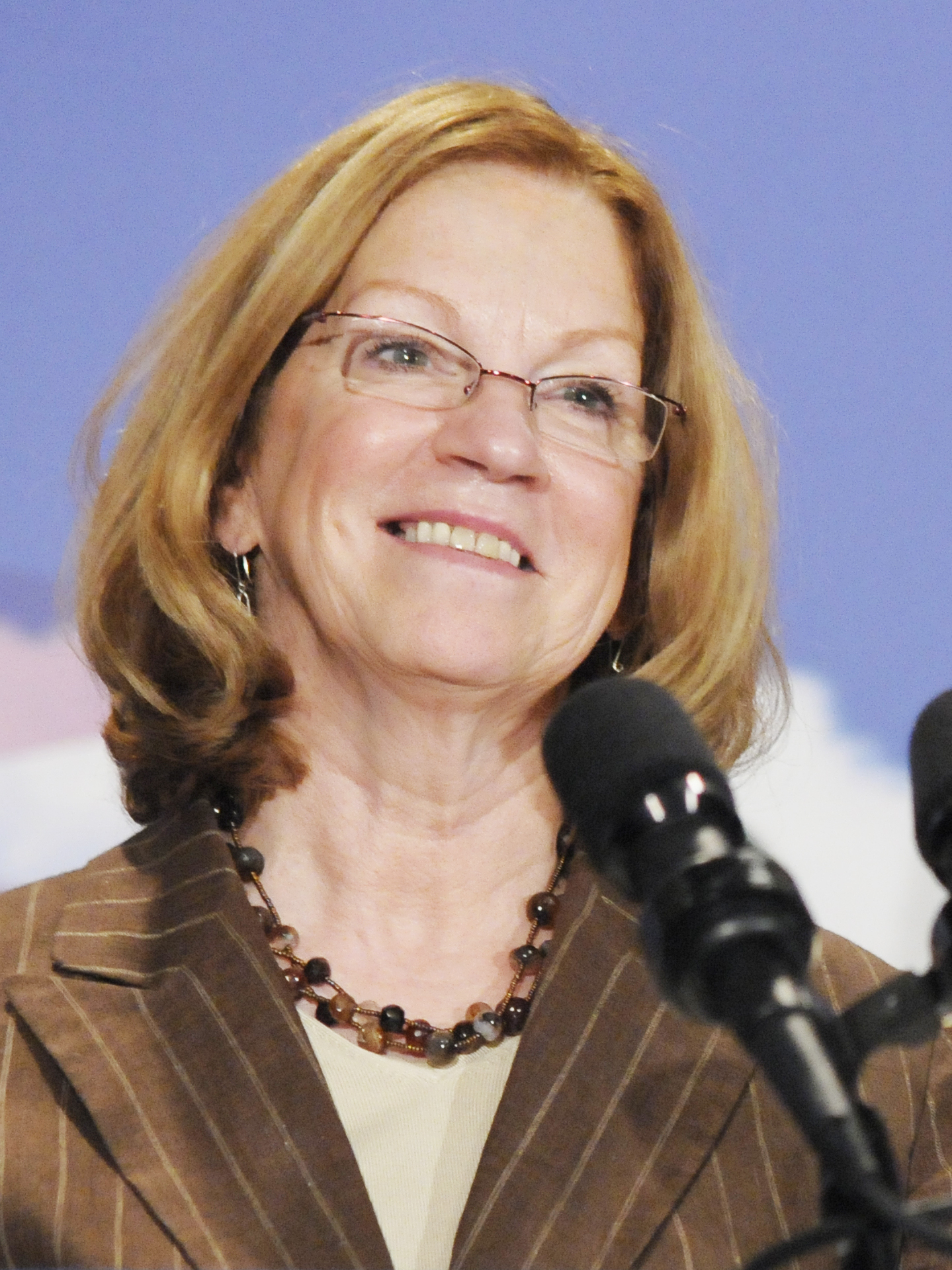

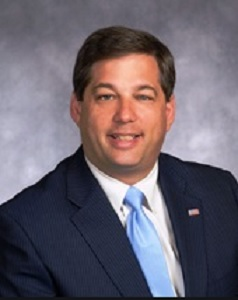
	Majority party	Minority party
Leader	Therese Murray (retired)	Bruce Tarr
Party	Democratic	Republican
Leader since	March 21, 2007	January 3, 2011
Leader's seat	Plymouth and Barnstable	1st Essex and Middlesex
Last election	36	4
Seats after	34	6
Seat change	▼2	▲2
Popular vote	1,280,527	540,101
Percentage	69.50%	29.31%
President before election
Therese Murray
Democratic
Elected President
Stan Rosenberg
Democratic

The 2014 Massachusetts Senate election was held on November 4, 2014, to determine which party would control the Massachusetts Senate for the following two years in the 189th Massachusetts General Court. All 40 senate seats were up for election and the primary was held on September 9, 2014. Prior to the election 36 seats were held by Democrats and 4 were held by Republicans. The general election saw Republicans gain two seats, despite this, Democrats still retained control of the Massachusetts Senate.

== Predictions ==
Source	Ranking	As of
Governing	Safe D	October 20, 2014

== Retirements ==
1. 2nd Essex and Middlesex district: Barry Finegold (D) retired.
2. 1st Hampden and Hampshire district: Gale D. Candaras (D) retired.
3. Plymouth and Barnstable district: Therese Murray (D) retired.
4. Worcester, Hampden, Hampshire and Middlesex district: Stephen Brewer (D) retired.

== Incumbents defeated ==
1. Worcester and Norfolk district: Richard T. Moore (D) lost re-election to Ryan Fattman.

== Results ==
=== Berkshire, Hampshire and Franklin district ===
Berkshire, Hampshire and Franklin district election, 2014
Party	Candidate	Votes	%
Democratic	Benjamin Downing (incumbent)	40,795	99.60%
	Scattering	154	0.40%
Total votes		40,949	100.0%
Democratic hold			

=== Bristol and Norfolk district ===
Bristol and Norfolk district election, 2014
Party	Candidate	Votes	%
Democratic	James E. Timilty (incumbent)	38,762	99.10%
	Scattering	351	0.90%
Total votes		39,113	100.0%
Democratic hold			

=== 1st Bristol and Plymouth district ===
1st Bristol and Plymouth district election, 2014
Party	Candidate	Votes	%
Democratic	Michael Rodrigues (incumbent)	26,022	65.30%
Republican	Derek A. Maksy	13,787	34.60%
	Scattering	23	0.10%
Total votes		39,832	100.0%
Democratic hold			

=== 2nd Bristol and Plymouth district ===
2nd Bristol and Plymouth district election, 2014
Party	Candidate	Votes	%
Democratic	Mark Montigny (incumbent)	28,945	98.70%
	Scattering	373	1.30%
Total votes		29,318	100.0%
Democratic hold			

=== Cape and Islands district ===
Cape and Islands district election, 2014
Party	Candidate	Votes	%
Democratic	Dan Wolf (incumbent)	46,960	62.40%
Republican	Ronald R. Beaty, Jr.	27,902	37.10%
Republican	Allen R. Waters (Write-in)	360	0.50%
	Scattering	75	0.00%
Total votes		75,297	100.0%
Democratic hold			

=== 1st Essex district ===
1st Essex district election, 2014
Party	Candidate	Votes	%
Democratic	Kathleen O'Connor Ives (incumbent)	30,107	53.80%
Republican	Shaun P. Toohey	25,830	46.10%
	Scattering	33	0.10%
Total votes		55,970	100.0%
Democratic hold			

=== 2nd Essex district ===
2nd Essex district election, 2014
Party	Candidate	Votes	%
Democratic	Joan Lovely (incumbent)	44,386	98.80%
	Scattering	548	1.20%
Total votes		44,934	100.0%
Democratic hold			

=== 3rd Essex district ===
3rd Essex district election, 2014
Party	Candidate	Votes	%
Democratic	Thomas M. McGee (incumbent)	39,528	98.90%
	Scattering	449	1.10%
Total votes		39,977	100.0%
Democratic hold			

=== 1st Essex and Middlesex district ===
1st Essex and Middlesex district election, 2014
Party	Candidate	Votes	%
Republican	Bruce Tarr (incumbent)	57,641	99.40%
	Scattering	371	0.60%
Total votes		58,012	100.0%
Republican hold			

=== 2nd Essex and Middlesex district ===
2nd Essex and Middlesex district election, 2014
Party	Candidate	Votes	%
Democratic	Barbara L'Italien	24,559	53.20%
Republican	Alex J. Vispoli	21,529	46.60%
	Scattering	64	0.20%
Total votes		46,152	100.0%
Democratic hold			

=== Hampden district ===
Hampden district election, 2014
Party	Candidate	Votes	%
Democratic	James T. Welch (incumbent)	25,271	98.00%
	Scattering	523	2.00%
Total votes		25,794	100.0%
Democratic hold			

=== 1st Hampden and Hampshire district ===
1st Hampden and Hampshire district election, 2014
Party	Candidate	Votes	%
Democratic	Eric Lesser	28,153	50.40%
Republican	Debra A. Boronski	24,964	44.70%
Independent	Mike Franco	2,705	4.80%
	Scattering	85	0.10%
Total votes		55,907	100.0%
Democratic hold			

=== 2nd Hampden and Hampshire district ===
2nd Hampden and Hampshire district election, 2014
Party	Candidate	Votes	%
Republican	Donald Humason Jr. (incumbent)	27,817	56.60%
Democratic	Patrick T. Leahy	21,275	43.30%
	Scattering	32	0.10%
Total votes		49,124	100.0%
Republican hold			

=== Hampshire, Franklin and Worcester district ===
Hampshire, Franklin and Worcester district election, 2014
Party	Candidate	Votes	%
Democratic	Stan Rosenberg (incumbent)	44,012	99.10%
	Scattering	388	0.90%
Total votes		44,400	100.0%
Democratic hold			

=== 1st Middlesex district ===
1st Middlesex district election, 2014
Party	Candidate	Votes	%
Democratic	Eileen Donoghue (incumbent)	32,835	98.00%
	Scattering	659	2.00%
Total votes		33,494	100.0%
Democratic hold			

=== 2nd Middlesex district ===
2nd Middlesex district election, 2014
Party	Candidate	Votes	%
Democratic	Patricia D. Jehlen (incumbent)	41,685	75.50%
Republican	Robert L. Cappucci, Jr.	13,406	24.30%
	Scattering	123	0.20%
Total votes		55,214	100.0%
Democratic hold			

=== 3rd Middlesex district ===
3rd Middlesex district election, 2014
Party	Candidate	Votes	%
Democratic	Michael J. Barrett (incumbent)	34,750	59.20%
Republican	Sandi Martinez	23,911	40.70%
	Scattering	40	0.10%
Total votes		58,701	100.0%
Democratic hold			

=== 4th Middlesex district ===
4th Middlesex district election, 2014
Party	Candidate	Votes	%
Democratic	Ken Donnelly (incumbent)	45,974	98.90%
	Scattering	493	1.10%
Total votes		46,467	100.0%
Democratic hold			

=== 5th Middlesex district ===
5th Middlesex district election, 2014
Party	Candidate	Votes	%
Democratic	Jason Lewis (incumbent)	32,143	56.80%
Republican	Monica C. Medeiros	24,406	43.10%
	Scattering	59	0.10%
Total votes		56,608	100.0%
Democratic hold			

=== 1st Middlesex and Norfolk district ===
1st Middlesex and Norfolk district election, 2014
Party	Candidate	Votes	%
Democratic	Cynthia Stone Creem (incumbent)	43,655	98.80%
	Scattering	510	1.20%
Total votes		44,165	100.0%
Democratic hold			

=== 2nd Middlesex and Norfolk district ===
2nd Middlesex and Norfolk district election, 2014
Party	Candidate	Votes	%
Democratic	Karen Spilka (incumbent)	38,191	98.30%
	Scattering	676	1.70%
Total votes		38,867	100.0%
Democratic hold			

=== Middlesex and Suffolk district ===
Middlesex and Suffolk district election, 2014
Party	Candidate	Votes	%
Democratic	Sal DiDomenico (incumbent)	31,575	98.80%
	Scattering	381	1.20%
Total votes		31,956	100.0%
Democratic hold			

=== Middlesex and Worcester district ===
Middlesex and Worcester district election, 2014
Party	Candidate	Votes	%
Democratic	Jamie Eldridge (incumbent)	45,379	98.60%
	Scattering	622	1.40%
Total votes		46,001	100.0%
Democratic hold			

=== Norfolk, Bristol and Middlesex district ===
Norfolk, Bristol and Middlesex district election, 2014
Party	Candidate	Votes	%
Republican	Richard J. Ross (incumbent)	34,952	61.00%
Democratic	Dylan Hayre	22,267	38.90%
	Scattering	52	0.10%
Total votes		57,271	100.0%
Republican hold			

=== Norfolk, Bristol and Plymouth district ===
Norfolk, Bristol and Plymouth district election, 2014
Party	Candidate	Votes	%
Democratic	Brian A. Joyce (incumbent)	41,348	98.90%
	Scattering	468	1.10%
Total votes		41,816	100.0%
Democratic hold			

=== Norfolk and Plymouth district ===
Norfolk and Plymouth district election, 2014
Party	Candidate	Votes	%
Democratic	John F. Keenan (incumbent)	32,679	66.00%
Republican	Leslie C. Gosule	16,786	33.90%
	Scattering	72	0.10%
Total votes		49,537	100.0%
Democratic hold			

=== Norfolk and Suffolk district ===
Norfolk and Suffolk district election, 2014
Party	Candidate	Votes	%
Democratic	Mike Rush (incumbent)	42,954	98.70%
	Scattering	586	1.30%
Total votes		43,540	100.0%
Democratic hold			

=== Plymouth and Barnstable district ===
Plymouth and Barnstable district election, 2014
Party	Candidate	Votes	%
Republican	Vinny deMacedo	38,250	61.10%
Democratic	Matthew Patrick	22,053	35.20%
Libertarian	Heather M. Mullins	2,272	3.60%
	Scattering	12	0.10%
Total votes		62,587	100.0%
Republican gain from Democratic			

=== Plymouth and Norfolk district ===
Plymouth and Norfolk district election, 2014
Party	Candidate	Votes	%
Republican	Bob Hedlund (incumbent)	55,294	99.10%
	Scattering	525	0.90%
Total votes		55,819	100.0%
Republican hold			

=== 1st Plymouth and Bristol district ===
1st Plymouth and Bristol district election, 2014
Party	Candidate	Votes	%
Democratic	Marc Pacheco (incumbent)	31,538	60.90%
Republican	David A. Rosa	20,174	39.00%
	Scattering	56	0.10%
Total votes		51,768	100.0%
Democratic hold			

=== 2nd Plymouth and Bristol district ===
2nd Plymouth and Bristol district election, 2014
Party	Candidate	Votes	%
Democratic	Thomas P. Kennedy (incumbent)	29,522	66.50%
Republican	Viola A. Ryerson	14,883	33.50%
	Scattering	22	0.00%
Total votes		44,427	100.0%
Democratic hold			

=== 1st Suffolk district ===
1st Suffolk district election, 2014
Party	Candidate	Votes	%
Democratic	Linda Dorcena Forry (incumbent)	32,298	83.70%
Independent	Robert E. Powers, Jr	6,119	15.90%
	Scattering	152	0.40%
Total votes		38,569	100.0%
Democratic hold			

=== 2nd Suffolk district ===
2nd Suffolk district election, 2014
Party	Candidate	Votes	%
Democratic	Sonia Chang-Díaz (incumbent)	33,742	89.80%
Republican	David James Wyatt	3,733	9.90%
	Scattering	114	0.30%
Total votes		37,589	100.0%
Democratic hold			

=== 1st Suffolk and Middlesex district ===
1st Suffolk and Middlesex district election, 2014
Party	Candidate	Votes	%
Democratic	Anthony Petruccelli (incumbent)	30,523	98.10%
	Scattering	579	1.90%
Total votes		31,102	100.0%
Democratic hold			

=== 2nd Suffolk and Middlesex district ===
2nd Suffolk and Middlesex district election, 2014
Party	Candidate	Votes	%
Democratic	Will Brownsberger (incumbent)	30,514	98.20%
	Scattering	566	1.80%
Total votes		31,080	100.0%
Democratic hold			

=== Worcester and Middlesex district ===
Worcester and Middlesex district election, 2014
Party	Candidate	Votes	%
Democratic	Jennifer Flanagan (incumbent)	29,133	60.40%
Republican	Richard M. Bastien	19,074	39.50%
	Scattering	27	0.10%
Total votes		48,234	100.0%
Democratic hold			

=== Worcester and Norfolk district ===
Worcester and Norfolk district election, 2014
Party	Candidate	Votes	%
Republican	Ryan Fattman	29,774	55.70%
Democratic	Richard T. Moore (incumbent)	23,662	44.30%
	Scattering	37	0.00%
Total votes		53,473	100.0%
Republican gain from Democratic			

=== Worcester, Hampden, Hampshire and Middlesex district ===
Worcester, Hampden, Hampshire and Middlesex district election, 2014
Party	Candidate	Votes	%
Democratic	Anne Gobi	27,847	50.30%
Republican	Michael J. Valanzola	27,449	49.60%
	Scattering	39	0.10%
Total votes		55,335	100.0%
Democratic hold			

=== 1st Worcester district ===
1st Worcester district election, 2014
Party	Candidate	Votes	%
Democratic	Harriette L. Chandler (incumbent)	27,576	60.20%
Republican	Paul J. Franco	18,179	39.70%
	Scattering	71	0.10%
Total votes		45,826	100.0%
Democratic hold			

=== 2nd Worcester district ===
2nd Worcester district election, 2014
Party	Candidate	Votes	%
Democratic	Michael O. Moore (incumbent)	37,909	98.80%
	Scattering	442	1.20%
Total votes		38,351	100.0%
Democratic hold			

== See also ==
- 2015–2016 Massachusetts legislature
- List of Massachusetts General Courts
