= 2012 Massachusetts State Senate election =

2012 Massachusetts Senate election
- November 6, 2012

All 40 seats in the Massachusetts Senate 21 seats needed for a majority
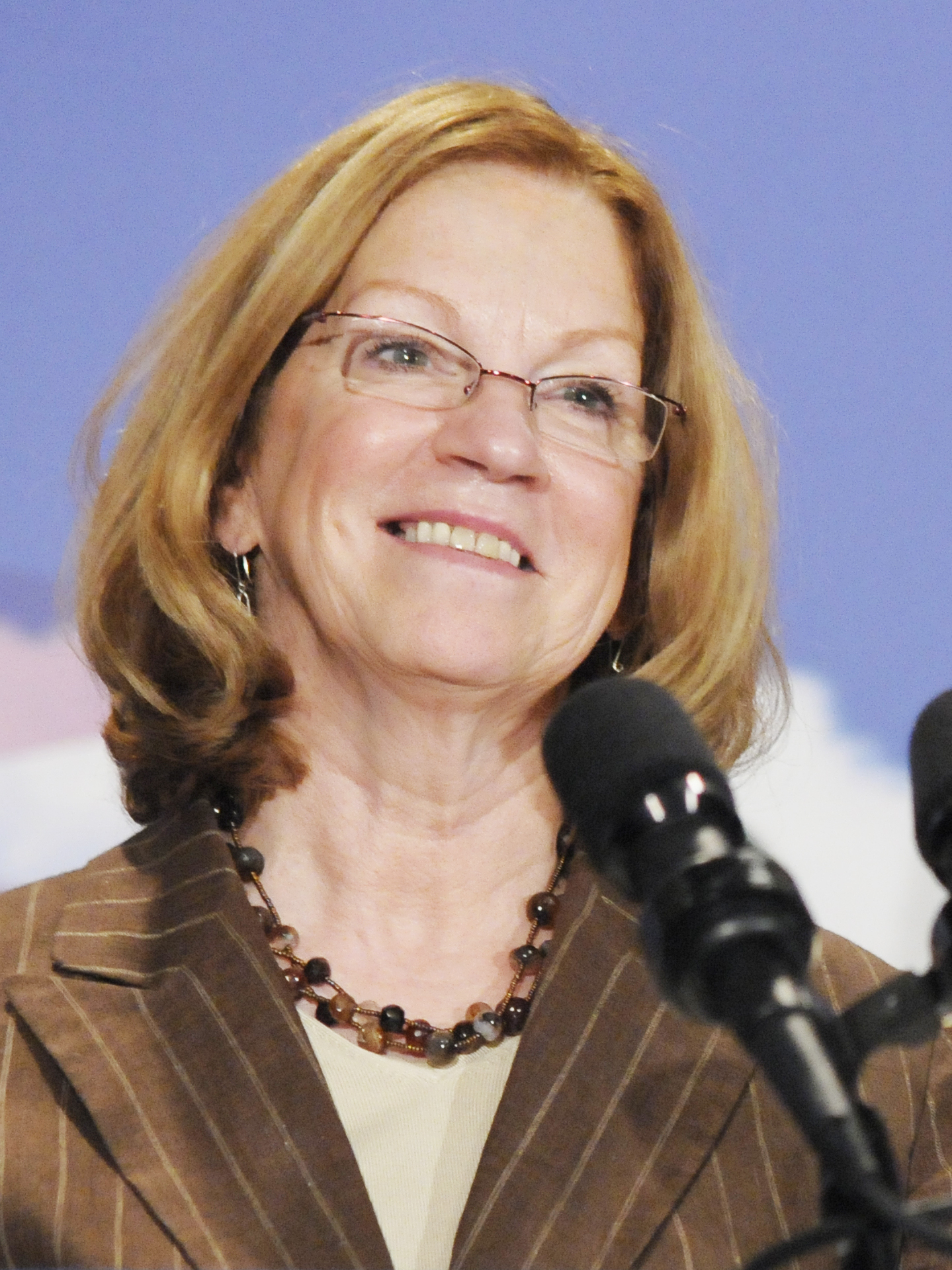

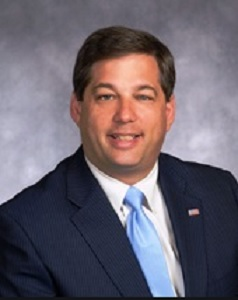
	Majority party	Minority party
Leader	Therese Murray	Bruce Tarr
Party	Democratic	Republican
Leader since	March 21, 2007	January 3, 2011
Leader's seat	Plymouth and Barnstable	1st Essex and Middlesex
Last election	36	4
Seats after	36	4
Seat change	Steady	Steady
Popular vote	2,012,117	545,523
Percentage	77.52%	21.02%
President before election
Therese Murray
Democratic
Elected President
Therese Murray
Democratic

The 2012 Massachusetts Senate election was held on November 6, 2012, to determine which party would control the Massachusetts Senate for the following two years in the 188th Massachusetts General Court. All 40 senate seats were up for election and the primary was held on September 6, 2012. Prior to the election 36 seats were held by Democrats and 4 were held by Republicans. The general election saw both parties holding on to the same amount of seats as the previous election, meaning that Democrats retained control of the Massachusetts Senate.

== Predictions ==
Source	Ranking	As of
Governing	Safe D	October 24, 2012

== Retirements ==
1. 2nd Essex district: Fred Berry (D) retired.
2. 3rd Middlesex district: Susan Fargo (D) retired.

== Results ==
=== Berkshire, Hampshire and Franklin district ===
Berkshire, Hampshire and Franklin district election, 2012
Party	Candidate	Votes	%
Democratic	Benjamin Downing (incumbent)	64,679	99.50%
	Scattering	307	0.50%
Total votes		64,986	100.0%
Democratic hold			

=== Bristol and Norfolk district ===
Bristol and Norfolk district election, 2012
Party	Candidate	Votes	%
Democratic	James E. Timilty (incumbent)	47,333	62.50%
Republican	Jeffrey Robert Bailey	28,354	37.40%
	Scattering	65	0.10%
Total votes		75,752	100.0%
Democratic hold			

=== 1st Bristol and Plymouth district ===
1st Bristol and Plymouth district election, 2012
Party	Candidate	Votes	%
Democratic	Michael Rodrigues (incumbent)	53,169	99.60%
	Scattering	197	0.40%
Total votes		53,366	100.0%
Democratic hold			

=== 2nd Bristol and Plymouth district ===
2nd Bristol and Plymouth district election, 2012
Party	Candidate	Votes	%
Democratic	Mark Montigny (incumbent)	55,059	99.20%
	Scattering	465	0.80%
Total votes		55,524	100.0%
Democratic hold			

=== Cape and Islands district ===
Cape and Islands district election, 2012
Party	Candidate	Votes	%
Democratic	Dan Wolf (incumbent)	80,236	99.50%
	Scattering	414	0.50%
Total votes		80,650	100.0%
Democratic hold			

=== 1st Essex district ===
1st Essex district election, 2012
Party	Candidate	Votes	%
Democratic	Kathleen O'Connor Ives	36,405	45.90%
Republican	Shaun P. Toohey	26,654	33.60%
Independent	Paul A. Magliocchetti	12,870	16.20%
Independent	James M. Kelcourse	3,358	4.20%
	Scattering	40	0.10%
Total votes		79,327	100.0%
Democratic hold			

=== 2nd Essex district ===
2nd Essex district election, 2012
Party	Candidate	Votes	%
Democratic	Joan Lovely	56,088	70.60%
Republican	Richard A. Jolitz	23,185	29.20%
	Scattering	126	0.20%
Total votes		79,399	100.0%
Democratic hold			

=== 3rd Essex district ===
3rd Essex district election, 2012
Party	Candidate	Votes	%
Democratic	Thomas M. McGee (incumbent)	56,936	98.90%
	Scattering	648	1.10%
Total votes		57,584	100.0%
Democratic hold			

=== 1st Essex and Middlesex district ===
1st Essex and Middlesex district election, 2012
Party	Candidate	Votes	%
Republican	Bruce Tarr (incumbent)	78,386	99.10%
	Scattering	731	0.90%
Total votes		79,117	100.0%
Republican hold			

=== 2nd Essex and Middlesex district ===
2nd Essex and Middlesex district election, 2012
Party	Candidate	Votes	%
Democratic	Barry Finegold (incumbent)	44,394	65.10%
Republican	Paul Adams	23,716	34.80%
	Scattering	112	0.10%
Total votes		68,222	100.0%
Democratic hold			

=== Hampden district ===
Hampden district election, 2012
Party	Candidate	Votes	%
Democratic	James T. Welch (incumbent)	44,180	98.60%
	Scattering	636	1.40%
Total votes		44,816	100.0%
Democratic hold			

=== 1st Hampden and Hampshire district ===
1st Hampden and Hampshire district election, 2012
Party	Candidate	Votes	%
Democratic	Gale D. Candaras (incumbent)	59,213	98.60%
	Scattering	829	1.40%
Total votes		60,042	100.0%
Democratic hold			

=== 2nd Hampden and Hampshire district ===
2nd Hampden and Hampshire district election, 2012
Party	Candidate	Votes	%
Republican	Michael Knapik (incumbent)	54,649	99.10%
	Scattering	479	0.90%
Total votes		55,128	100.0%
Republican hold			

=== Hampshire, Franklin and Worcester district ===
Hampshire, Franklin and Worcester district election, 2012
Party	Candidate	Votes	%
Democratic	Stan Rosenberg (incumbent)	66,072	99.40%
	Scattering	391	0.60%
Total votes		66,463	100.0%
Democratic hold			

=== 1st Middlesex district ===
1st Middlesex district election, 2012
Party	Candidate	Votes	%
Democratic	Eileen Donoghue (incumbent)	44,177	71.10%
Republican	James J. Buba	17,884	28.80%
	Scattering	110	0.10%
Total votes		62,171	100.0%
Democratic hold			

=== 2nd Middlesex district ===
2nd Middlesex district election, 2012
Party	Candidate	Votes	%
Democratic	Patricia D. Jehlen (incumbent)	66,267	98.60%
	Scattering	968	1.40%
Total votes		67,235	100.0%
Democratic hold			

=== 3rd Middlesex district ===
3rd Middlesex district election, 2012
Party	Candidate	Votes	%
Democratic	Michael J. Barrett	49,213	60.50%
Republican	Sandi Martinez	32,003	39.40%
	Scattering	97	0.10%
Total votes		81,313	100.0%
Democratic hold			

=== 4th Middlesex district ===
4th Middlesex district election, 2012
Party	Candidate	Votes	%
Democratic	Ken Donnelly (incumbent)	56,100	68.00%
Republican	Gerry Dembrowski	26,210	31.80%
	Scattering	130	0.20%
Total votes		82,440	100.0%
Democratic hold			

=== 5th Middlesex district ===
5th Middlesex district election, 2012
Party	Candidate	Votes	%
Democratic	Katherine Clark (incumbent)	58,256	98.80%
	Scattering	696	1.20%
Total votes		58,952	100.0%
Democratic hold			

=== 1st Middlesex and Norfolk district ===
1st Middlesex and Norfolk district election, 2012
Party	Candidate	Votes	%
Democratic	Cynthia Stone Creem (incumbent)	61,397	98.90%
	Scattering	655	1.10%
Total votes		62,052	100.0%
Democratic hold			

=== 2nd Middlesex and Norfolk district ===
2nd Middlesex and Norfolk district election, 2012
Party	Candidate	Votes	%
Democratic	Karen Spilka (incumbent)	57,863	98.40%
	Scattering	915	1.60%
Total votes		58,778	100.0%
Democratic hold			

=== Middlesex and Suffolk district ===
Middlesex and Suffolk district election, 2012
Party	Candidate	Votes	%
Democratic	Sal DiDomenico (incumbent)	47,586	98.90%
	Scattering	511	1.10%
Total votes		48,097	100.0%
Democratic hold			

=== Middlesex and Worcester district ===
Middlesex and Worcester district election, 2012
Party	Candidate	Votes	%
Democratic	Jamie Eldridge (incumbent)	52,922	64.50%
Republican	Dean J. Cavaretta	28,797	35.10%
	Scattering	268	0.40%
Total votes		81,987	100.0%
Democratic hold			

=== Norfolk, Bristol and Middlesex district ===
Norfolk, Bristol and Middlesex district election, 2012
Party	Candidate	Votes	%
Republican	Richard J. Ross (incumbent)	60,885	98.90%
	Scattering	669	1.10%
Total votes		61,554	100.0%
Republican hold			

=== Norfolk, Bristol and Plymouth district ===
Norfolk, Bristol and Plymouth district election, 2012
Party	Candidate	Votes	%
Democratic	Brian A. Joyce (incumbent)	64,019	98.00%
	Scattering	1,277	2.00%
Total votes		65,296	100.0%
Democratic hold			

=== Norfolk and Plymouth district ===
Norfolk and Plymouth district election, 2012
Party	Candidate	Votes	%
Democratic	John F. Keenan (incumbent)	56,518	98.70%
	Scattering	735	1.30%
Total votes		57,253	100.0%
Democratic hold			

=== Norfolk and Suffolk district ===
Norfolk and Suffolk district election, 2012
Party	Candidate	Votes	%
Democratic	Mike Rush (incumbent)	60,699	98.60%
	Scattering	868	1.40%
Total votes		61,567	100.0%
Democratic hold			

=== Plymouth and Barnstable district ===
Plymouth and Barnstable district election, 2012
Party	Candidate	Votes	%
Democratic	Therese Murray (incumbent)	49,723	58.10%
Republican	Thomas F. Keyes	35,776	41.80%
	Scattering	51	0.10%
Total votes		85,550	100.0%
Democratic hold			

=== Plymouth and Norfolk district ===
Plymouth and Norfolk district election, 2012
Party	Candidate	Votes	%
Republican	Bob Hedlund (incumbent)	61,686	68.30%
Democratic	Genevieve S. Davis	28,579	31.60%
	Scattering	88	0.10%
Total votes		90,353	100.0%
Republican hold			

=== 1st Plymouth and Bristol district ===
1st Plymouth and Bristol district election, 2012
Party	Candidate	Votes	%
Democratic	Marc Pacheco (incumbent)	61,506	98.70%
	Scattering	787	1.30%
Total votes		62,293	100.0%
Democratic hold			

=== 2nd Plymouth and Bristol district ===
2nd Plymouth and Bristol district election, 2012
Party	Candidate	Votes	%
Democratic	Thomas P. Kennedy (incumbent)	53,717	99.40%
	Scattering	345	0.60%
Total votes		54,062	100.0%
Democratic hold			

=== 1st Suffolk district ===
1st Suffolk district election, 2012
Party	Candidate	Votes	%
Democratic	Jack Hart (incumbent)	54,191	98.30%
	Scattering	942	1.70%
Total votes		55,134	100.0%
Democratic hold			

=== 2nd Suffolk district ===
2nd Suffolk district election, 2012
Party	Candidate	Votes	%
Democratic	Sonia Chang-Díaz (incumbent)	54,886	98.60%
	Scattering	791	1.40%
Total votes		55,677	100.0%
Democratic hold			

=== 1st Suffolk and Middlesex district ===
1st Suffolk and Middlesex district election, 2012
Party	Candidate	Votes	%
Democratic	Anthony Petruccelli (incumbent)	45,230	81.30%
Republican	Thomas J. Dooley, III	10,199	18.30%
	Scattering	174	0.40%
Total votes		55,603	100.0%
Democratic hold			

=== 2nd Suffolk and Middlesex district ===
2nd Suffolk and Middlesex district election, 2012
Party	Candidate	Votes	%
Democratic	Will Brownsberger (incumbent)	45,852	76.10%
Republican	Steven W. Aylward	14,190	23.60%
	Scattering	183	0.30%
Total votes		60,225	100.0%
Democratic hold			

=== Worcester and Middlesex district ===
Worcester and Middlesex district election, 2012
Party	Candidate	Votes	%
Democratic	Jennifer Flanagan (incumbent)	55,228	99.30%
	Scattering	392	0.70%
Total votes		55,620	100.0%
Democratic hold			

=== Worcester and Norfolk district ===
Worcester and Norfolk district election, 2012
Party	Candidate	Votes	%
Democratic	Richard T. Moore (incumbent)	59,561	95.30%
	Scattering	2,949	4.70%
Total votes		62,510	100.0%
Democratic hold			

=== Worcester, Hampden, Hampshire and Middlesex district ===
Worcester, Hampden, Hampshire and Middlesex district election, 2012
Party	Candidate	Votes	%
Democratic	Stephen Brewer (incumbent)	63,777	99.20%
	Scattering	520	0.80%
Total votes		64,297	100.0%
Democratic hold			

=== 1st Worcester district ===
1st Worcester district election, 2012
Party	Candidate	Votes	%
Democratic	Harriette L. Chandler (incumbent)	52,477	98.20%
	Scattering	976	1.80%
Total votes		53,453	100.0%
Democratic hold			

=== 2nd Worcester district ===
2nd Worcester district election, 2012
Party	Candidate	Votes	%
Democratic	Michael O. Moore (incumbent)	48,609	67.80%
Republican	Stephen R. Simonian	22,949	32.00%
	Scattering	115	0.20%
Total votes		71,673	100.0%
Democratic hold			

== See also ==
- 2013–2014 Massachusetts legislature
- List of Massachusetts General Courts
