= Massachusetts Senate's 2nd Middlesex and Norfolk district =

American legislative district

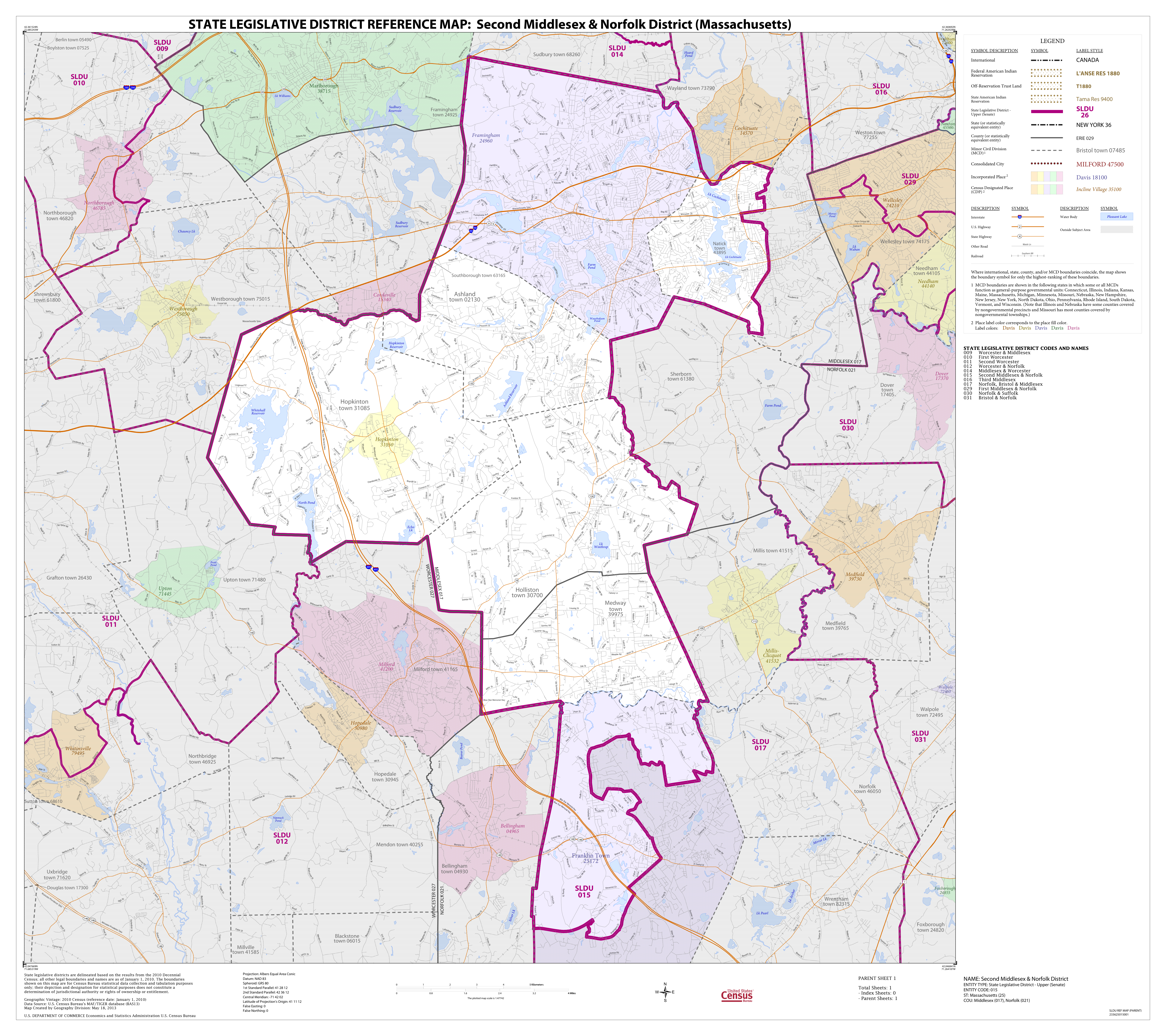
Map of Massachusetts Senate's 2nd Middlesex and Norfolk district, based on the 2010 United States census.

Massachusetts Senate's 2nd Middlesex and Norfolk district is one of 40 legislative districts of the Massachusetts Senate. It covers 9.9% of Middlesex County and 1.8% of Norfolk County by population. Democrat Karen Spilka of Ashland has represented the district since 2005.

== Locales represented ==
The district includes the following localities:

- Ashland
- Framingham
- Holliston
- Hopkinton
- Medway
- Natick

The current district geographic boundary overlaps with those of the Massachusetts House of Representatives' 4th Middlesex, 5th Middlesex, 6th Middlesex, 7th Middlesex, 8th Middlesex, 10th Norfolk, 8th Worcester, and 19th Worcester districts.

== Senators ==
- David H. Locke
- Jack H. Backman, 1979-1987
- Lois Pines
- David P. Magnani, circa 2002
- Karen E. Spilka, 2005-current

== See also ==
- List of Massachusetts Senate elections
- List of Massachusetts General Courts
- List of former districts of the Massachusetts Senate
- Middlesex County districts of the Massachusetts House of Representatives: 1st, 2nd, 3rd, 4th, 5th, 6th, 7th, 8th, 9th, 10th, 11th, 12th, 13th, 14th, 15th, 16th, 17th, 18th, 19th, 20th, 21st, 22nd, 23rd, 24th, 25th, 26th, 27th, 28th, 29th, 30th, 31st, 32nd, 33rd, 34th, 35th, 36th, 37th
- Norfolk County districts of the Massachusetts House of Representatives: 1st, 2nd, 3rd, 4th, 5th, 6th, 7th, 8th, 9th, 10th, 11th, 12th, 13th, 14th, 15th
