= Massachusetts Senate's Norfolk and Middlesex district =

American legislative district

Massachusetts Senate's Norfolk and Middlesex district, formerly the 1st Middlesex and Norfolk district, is one of 40 legislative districts of the Massachusetts Senate. It covers 5.4% of Middlesex County and 12.8% of Norfolk County population. Democrat Cindy Creem of Newton has represented the district since 1999.

== Locales represented ==
The district includes the following localities:

- Brookline
- Newton
- part of Wellesley

The current district geographic boundary overlaps with those of the Massachusetts House of Representatives' 10th Middlesex, 11th Middlesex, 12th Middlesex, 14th Norfolk, 15th Norfolk, 10th Suffolk, and 17th Suffolk districts.

== Senators ==
- Edward Lawrence Burke, 1974-1987
- Lois Pines, 1987-1999
- Cynthia Stone Creem, 1999-current

== See also ==
- List of Massachusetts Senate elections
- List of Massachusetts General Courts
- List of former districts of the Massachusetts Senate
- Middlesex County districts of the Massachusetts House of Representatives: 1st, 2nd, 3rd, 4th, 5th, 6th, 7th, 8th, 9th, 10th, 11th, 12th, 13th, 14th, 15th, 16th, 17th, 18th, 19th, 20th, 21st, 22nd, 23rd, 24th, 25th, 26th, 27th, 28th, 29th, 30th, 31st, 32nd, 33rd, 34th, 35th, 36th, 37th
- Norfolk County districts of the Massachusetts House of Representatives: 1st, 2nd, 3rd, 4th, 5th, 6th, 7th, 8th, 9th, 10th, 11th, 12th, 13th, 14th, 15th
