= Massachusetts Senate's Plymouth and Norfolk district =

American legislative district

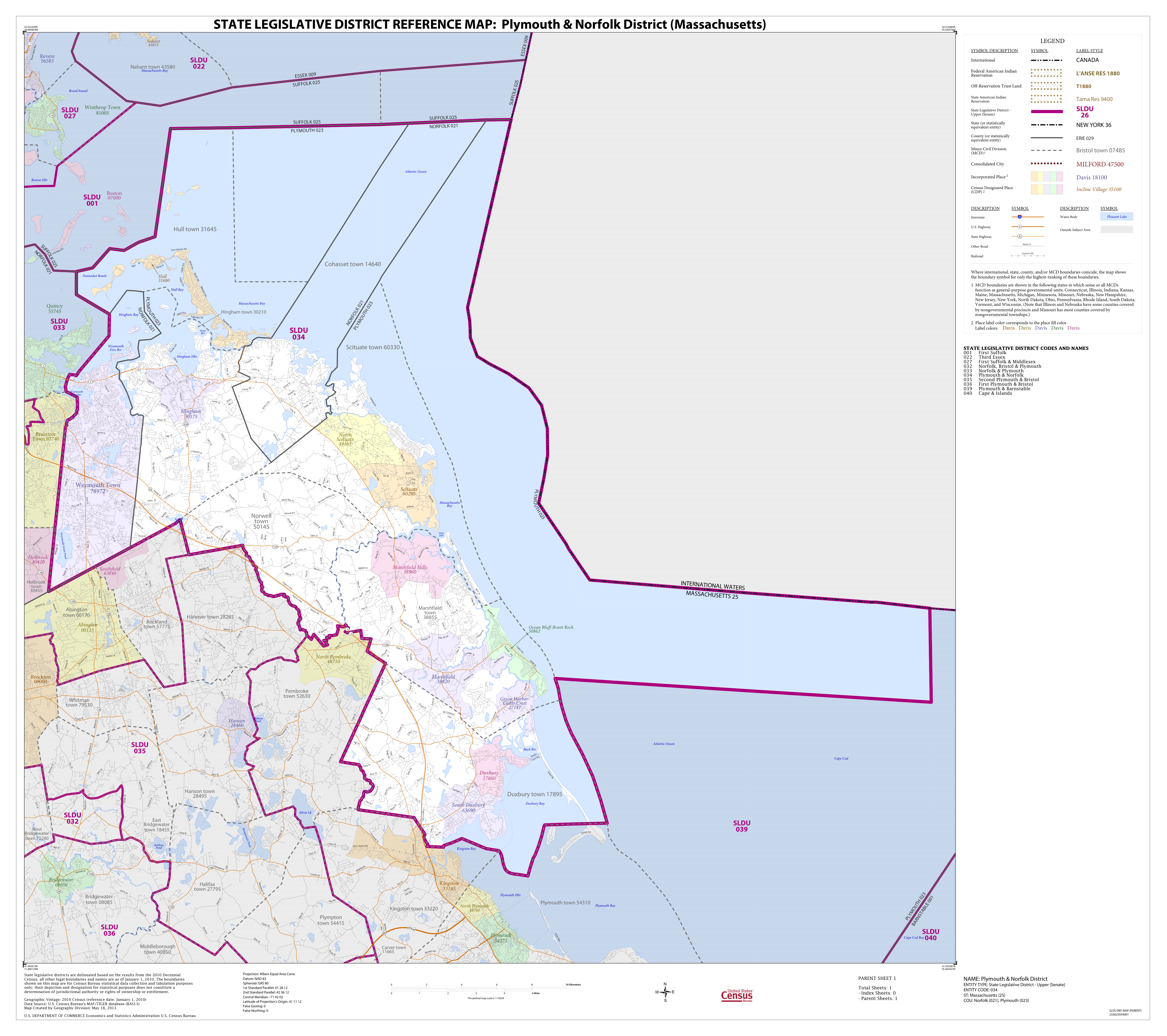
Map of Massachusetts Senate's Plymouth and Norfolk district, based on the 2010 United States census.

Massachusetts Senate's Plymouth and Norfolk district in the United States is one of 40 legislative districts of the Massachusetts Senate. It covers 9.1% of Norfolk County and 20.5% of Plymouth County population. Republican Patrick O'Connor of Weymouth has represented the district since 2016.

Candidates for this district seat in the 2020 Massachusetts general election include Meg Wheeler.

== Towns represented ==
The district includes the following localities:

- Cohasset
- Duxbury
- Hingham
- Hull
- Marshfield
- Norwell
- Scituate
- Weymouth

== Senators ==
- Anna Buckley
- Robert L. Hedlund, Jr., circa 2002
- Patrick M. O'Connor, 2016-current

== See also ==
- List of Massachusetts Senate elections
- List of Massachusetts General Courts
- List of former districts of the Massachusetts Senate
- Norfolk County districts of the Massachusetts House of Representatives: 1st, 2nd, 3rd, 4th, 5th, 6th, 7th, 8th, 9th, 10th, 11th, 12th, 13th, 14th, 15th
- Plymouth County districts of the Massachusetts House of Representatives: 1st, 2nd, 3rd, 4th, 5th, 6th, 7th, 8th, 9th, 10th, 11th, 12th

== Images ==
Portraits of legislators

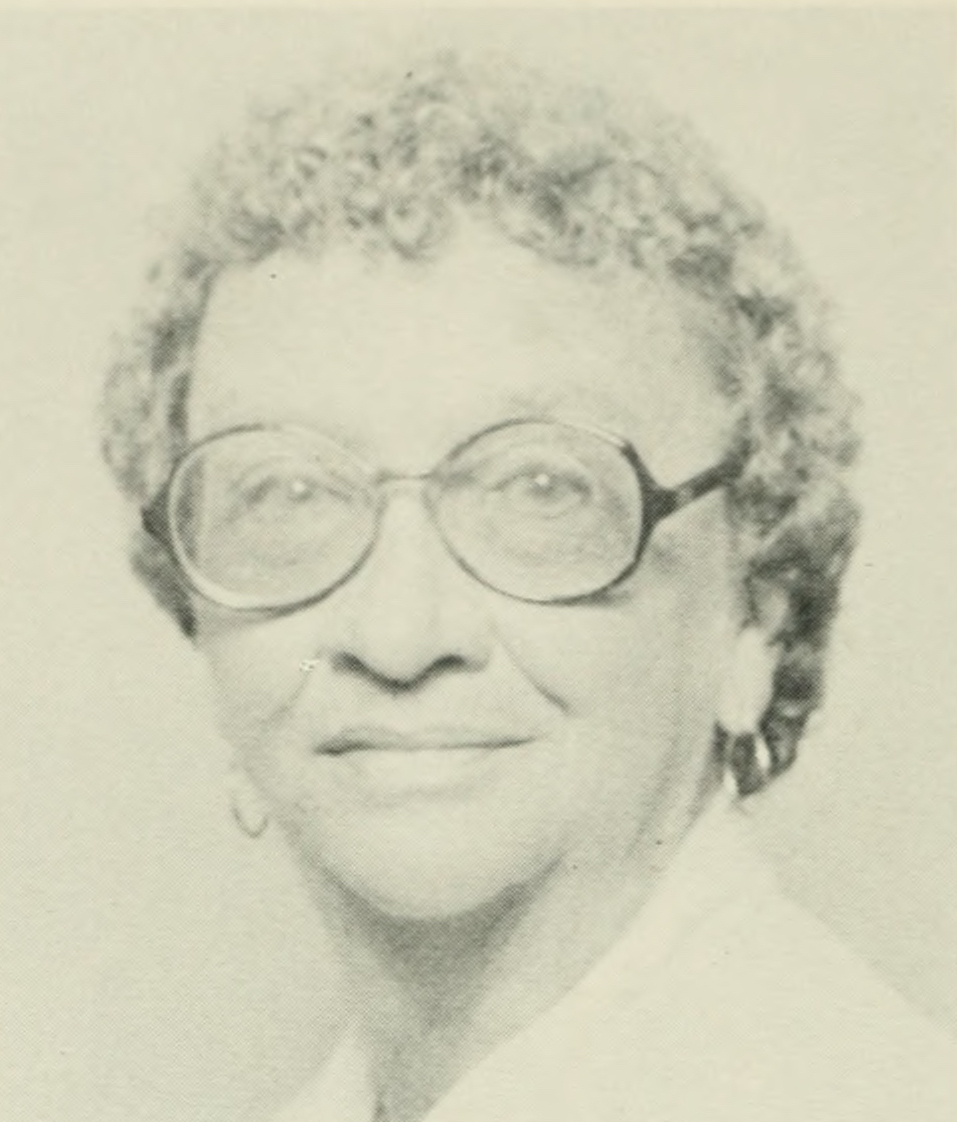
Anna Buckley

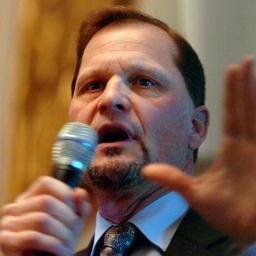
Robert L. Hedlund

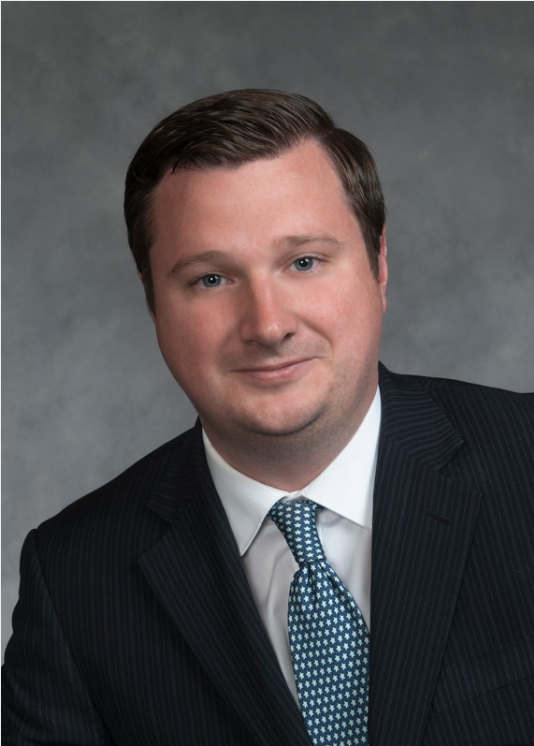
Patrick O'Connor
