= Massachusetts Senate's Norfolk, Plymouth and Bristol district =

American legislative district

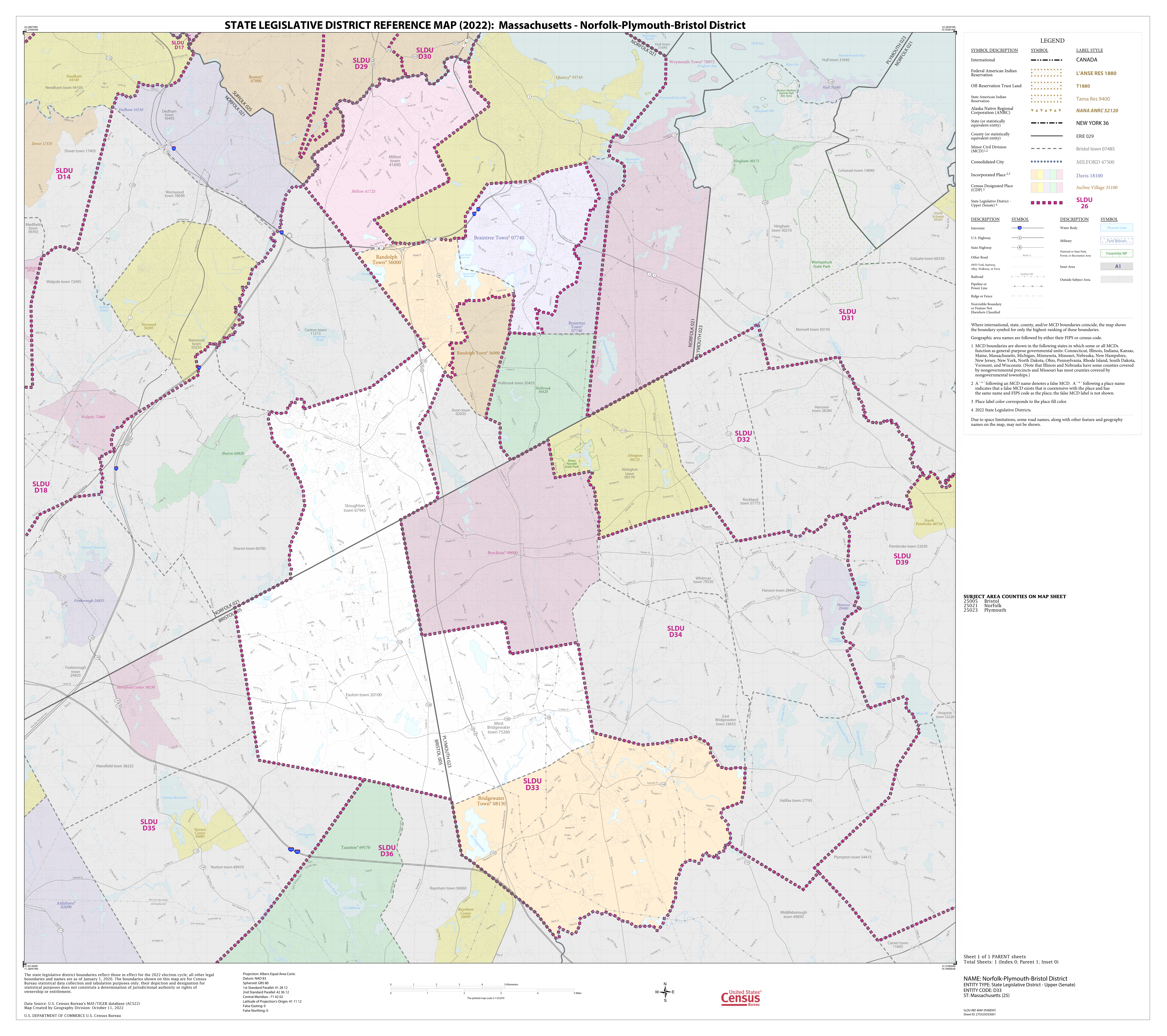
Map of Massachusetts Senate's Norfolk, Plymouth and Bristol district, based on the 2020 United States census.

Massachusetts Senate's Norfolk, Plymouth and Bristol district is one of 40 legislative districts of the Massachusetts Senate. It covers portions of Bristol, Plymouth, and Norfolk counties.

The district, previously known as the Norfolk, Bristol and Plymouth district, is currently represented by William Driscoll of the Democratic Party.

== Locales represented ==
As of 2023, district includes the following localities:

- part of Braintree
- Bridgewater
- Easton
- Milton
- part of Randolph
- Stoughton
- West Bridgewater

== Senators ==
- John M. Quinlan, circa 1973
- William R. Keating, circa 1995-1997
- Jo Ann Sprague, 1999-2001
- Brian A. Joyce, 2003-2017
- Walter F. Timilty Jr., 2017-2025
- William Driscoll, 2025-Present

== See also ==
- List of Massachusetts Senate elections
- List of Massachusetts General Courts
- Bristol County districts of the Massachusetts House of Representatives: 1st, 2nd, 3rd, 4th, 5th, 6th, 7th, 8th, 9th, 10th, 11th, 12th, 13th, 14th
- Norfolk County districts of the Massachusetts House of Representatives: 1st, 2nd, 3rd, 4th, 5th, 6th, 7th, 8th, 9th, 10th, 11th, 12th, 13th, 14th, 15th
- Plymouth County districts of the Massachusetts House of Representatives: 1st, 2nd, 3rd, 4th, 5th, 6th, 7th, 8th, 9th, 10th, 11th, 12th
- List of former districts of the Massachusetts Senate

== Images ==
Portraits of legislators

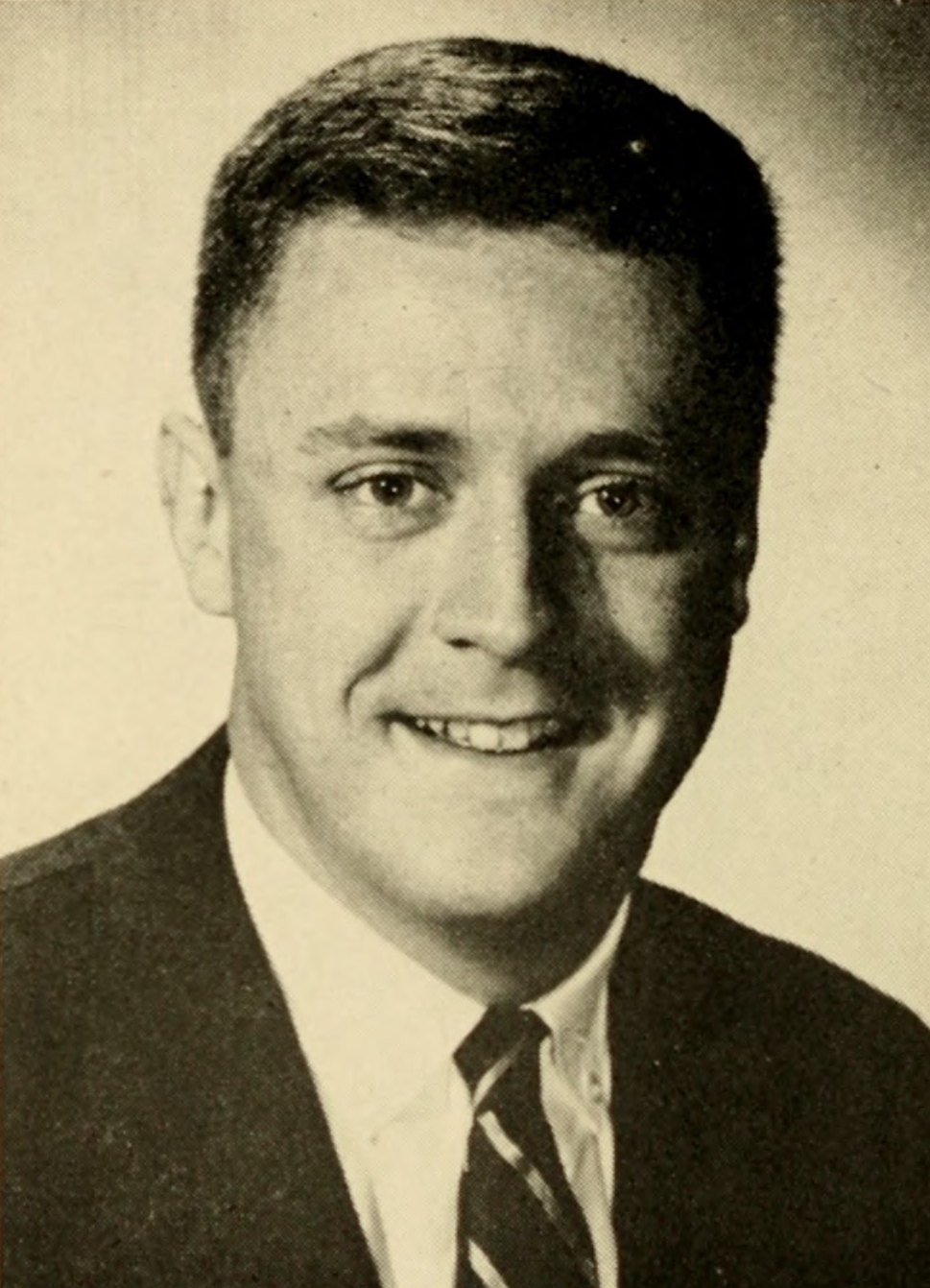
John Quinlan

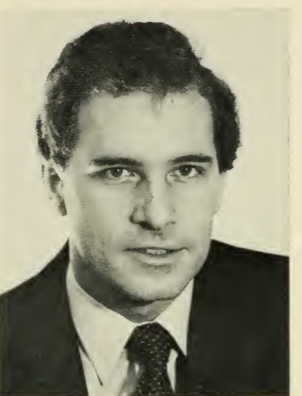
William Keating

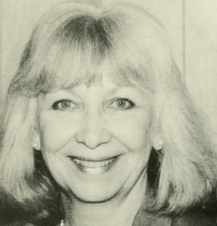
Jo Ann Sprague

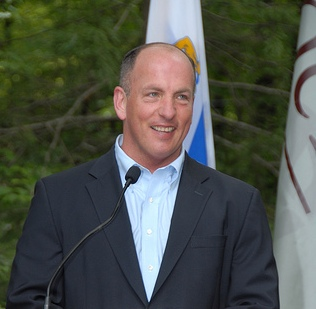
Brian Joyce

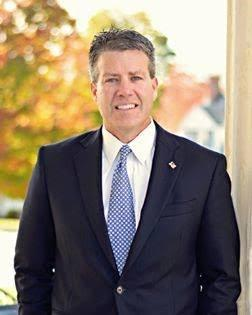
Walter Timilty
