= Massachusetts Senate's Norfolk and Plymouth district =

American legislative district

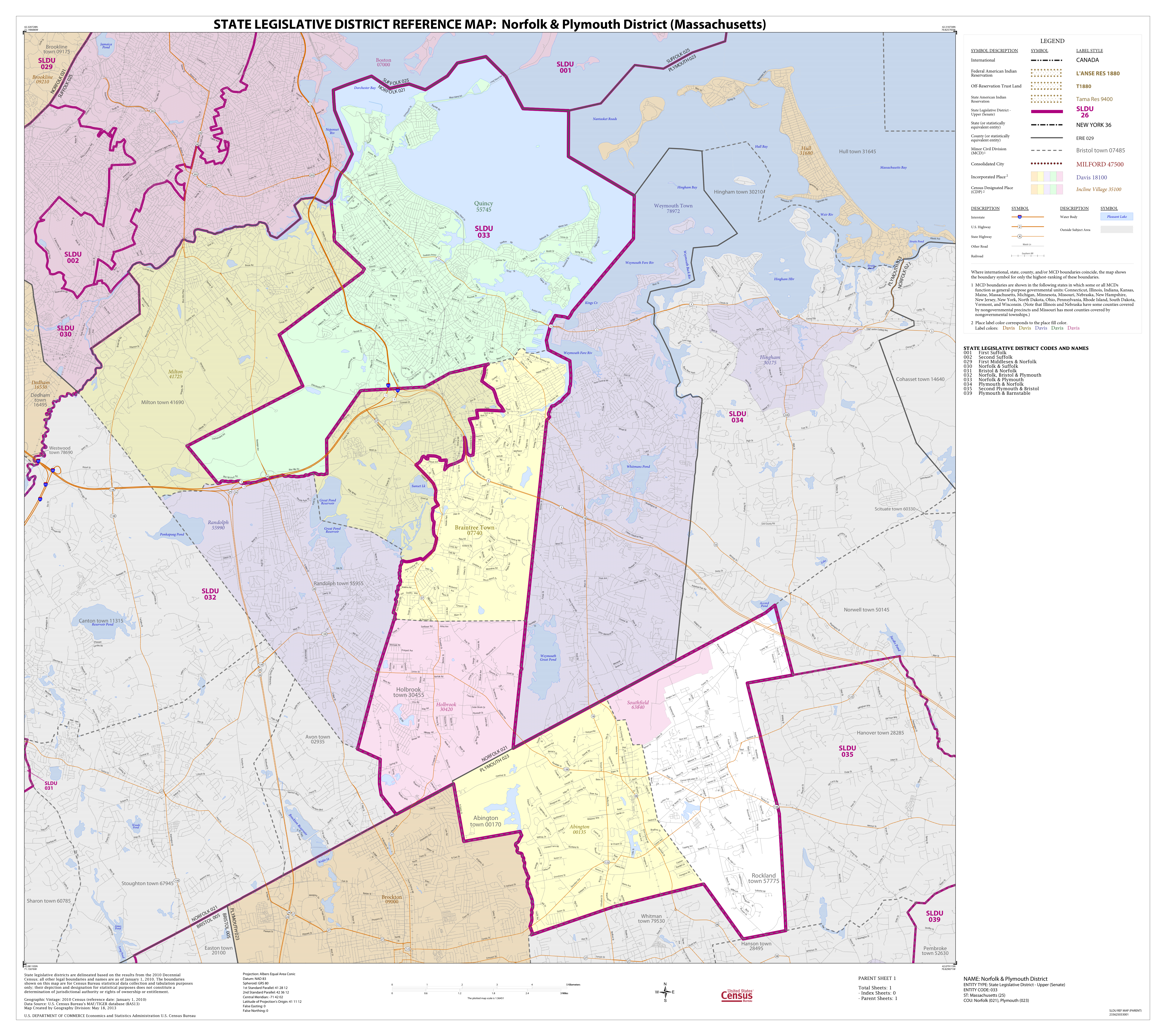
Map of Massachusetts Senate's Norfolk and Plymouth district, based on the 2010 United States census.

Massachusetts Senate's Norfolk and Plymouth district in the United States is one of 40 legislative districts of the Massachusetts Senate. It covers 18.9% of Norfolk County and 6.8% of Plymouth County population. Democrat John Keenan of Quincy has represented the district since 2011.

== Locales represented ==
The district includes the following localities:

- Abington
- Braintree
- Hanover
- Holbrook
- Quincy
- Rockland

== Senators ==
- Kenneth Nash
- Walter Shuebruk
- Newland H. Holmes, circa 1935-1957
- William D. Weeks, circa 1969
- Allan Robert McKinnon, circa 1979
- William Brownell Golden, circa 1985
- Robert Hedlund, circa 1991
- Brian J. McDonald, circa 1993
- Michael W. Morrissey, circa 2002
- John F. Keenan, 2011-current

== Images ==
Portraits of legislators

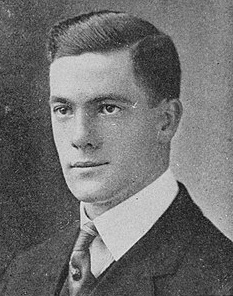
Kenneth Nash

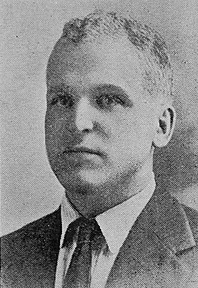
Walter Shuebruk

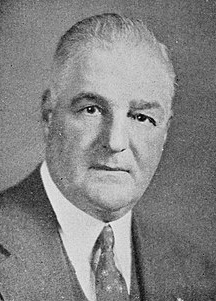
Newland Holmes

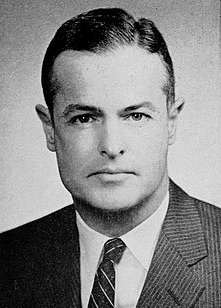
William Weeks

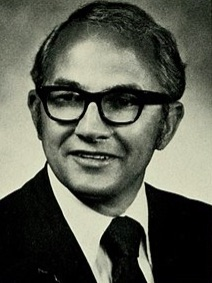
Allan Robert McKinnon

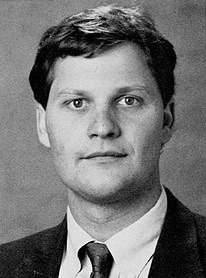
Robert Hedlund

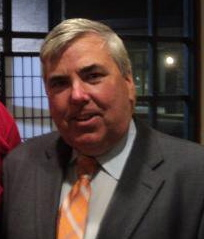
Michael W. Morrissey

== See also ==
- List of Massachusetts Senate elections
- List of Massachusetts General Courts
- List of former districts of the Massachusetts Senate
- Plymouth County districts of the Massachusetts House of Representatives: 1st, 2nd, 3rd, 4th, 5th, 6th, 7th, 8th, 9th, 10th, 11th, 12th
- Norfolk County districts of the Massachusetts House of Representatives: 1st, 2nd, 3rd, 4th, 5th, 6th, 7th, 8th, 9th, 10th, 11th, 12th, 13th, 14th, 15th
