= Massachusetts Senate's Norfolk and Suffolk district =

American legislative district

- inline Constituency of the Massachusetts State Senate
Current
–[[, Massachusetts|]]
- Demographics: 72.0% White; 11.5% Black/African American; 5.2% Asian; 0.7% Other race; 1.8% Two or more races; 8.8% Hispanic
- Population: 164,397

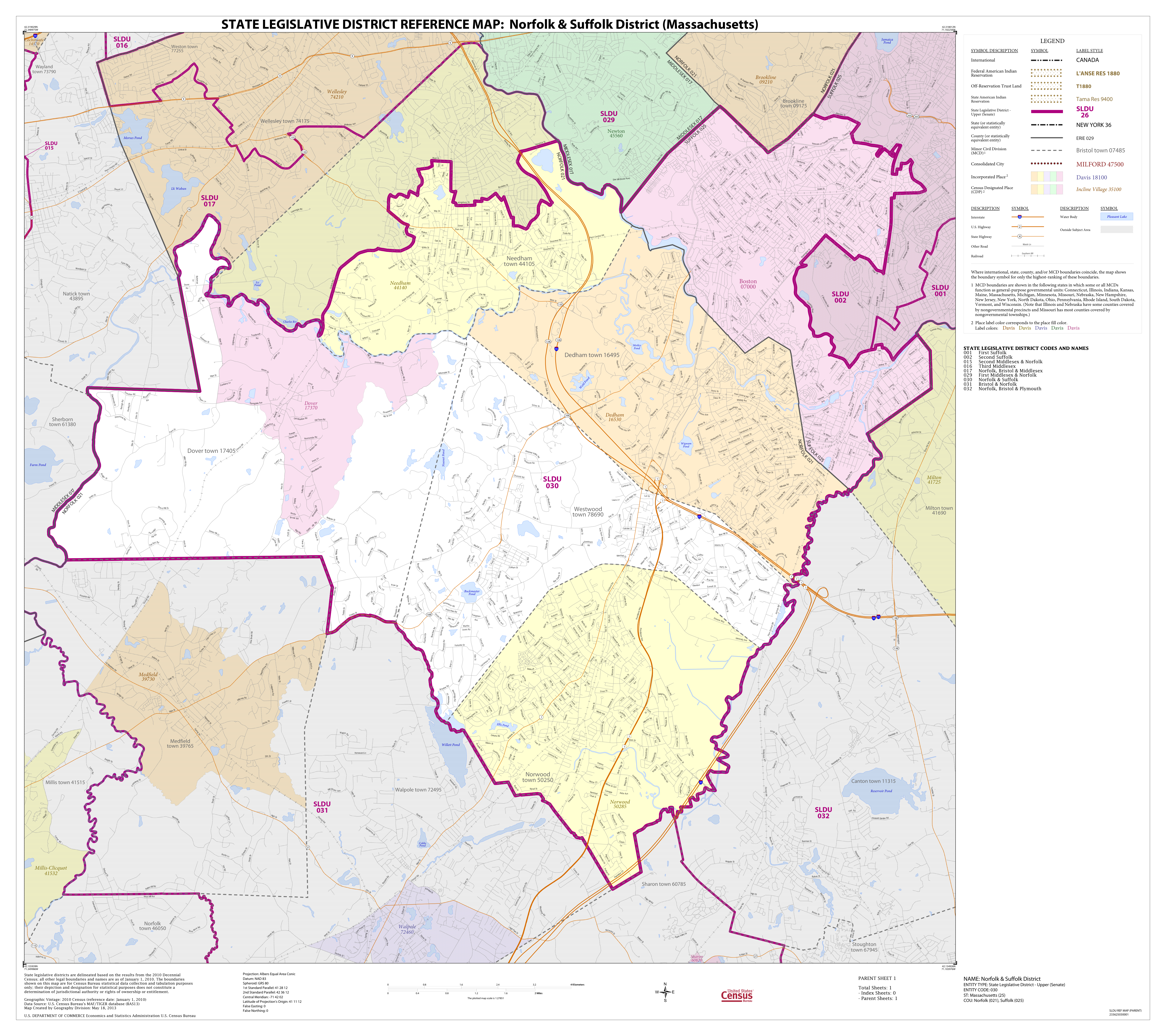
Map of Massachusetts Senate's Norfolk and Suffolk district, based on the 2010 United States census.

Norfolk and Suffolk is a district of the Massachusetts Senate. Democrat Mike Rush of West Roxbury has represented the district since 2011.

In Suffolk County, the district currently encompasses Boston Ward 18, Pcts. 9–12, 16–17, 19–20, 22–23; Ward 19, Pcts. 2, 3, 5, 8–11, 13; and Ward 20.

In Norfolk County, the district currently encompasses Dedham, Norwood, Walpole, and Westwood.

== List of senators ==
Senator	Party	Years
Erland F. Fish		
Richard S. Bowers		
Philip G. Bowker		
Beryl W. Cohen	Democratic	1969 – 1970
Jack H. Backman	Democratic	1971 – 1974
Joseph F. Timilty	Democratic	1975 – 1984
William R. Keating	Democratic	1985 – 1988
District eliminated		1989 – 1994
Marian Walsh	Democratic	1995 – 2000
District eliminated		2001 – 2012
Mike Rush	Democratic	2013 – Present

== See also ==
- List of former districts of the Massachusetts Senate
- Norfolk County districts of the Massachusetts House of Representatives: 1st, 2nd, 3rd, 4th, 5th, 6th, 7th, 8th, 9th, 10th, 11th, 12th, 13th, 14th, 15th
- Suffolk County districts of the Massachusetts House of Representatives: 1st, 2nd, 3rd, 4th, 5th, 6th, 7th, 8th, 9th, 10th, 11th, 12th, 13th, 14th, 15th, 16th, 17th, 18th, 19th
