= Massachusetts Senate's Bristol and Norfolk district =

American legislative district

- inline Constituency of the Massachusetts State Senate
Current
–[[, Massachusetts|]]
- Demographics: 91.21%% White; 2.34%% Black/African American; 0.05%% Native American; 4.07%% Asian; 0.04%% Hawaiian/Pacific Islander; 0.80%% Other race; 1.48%% Two or more races
- Population (2012): 157,172

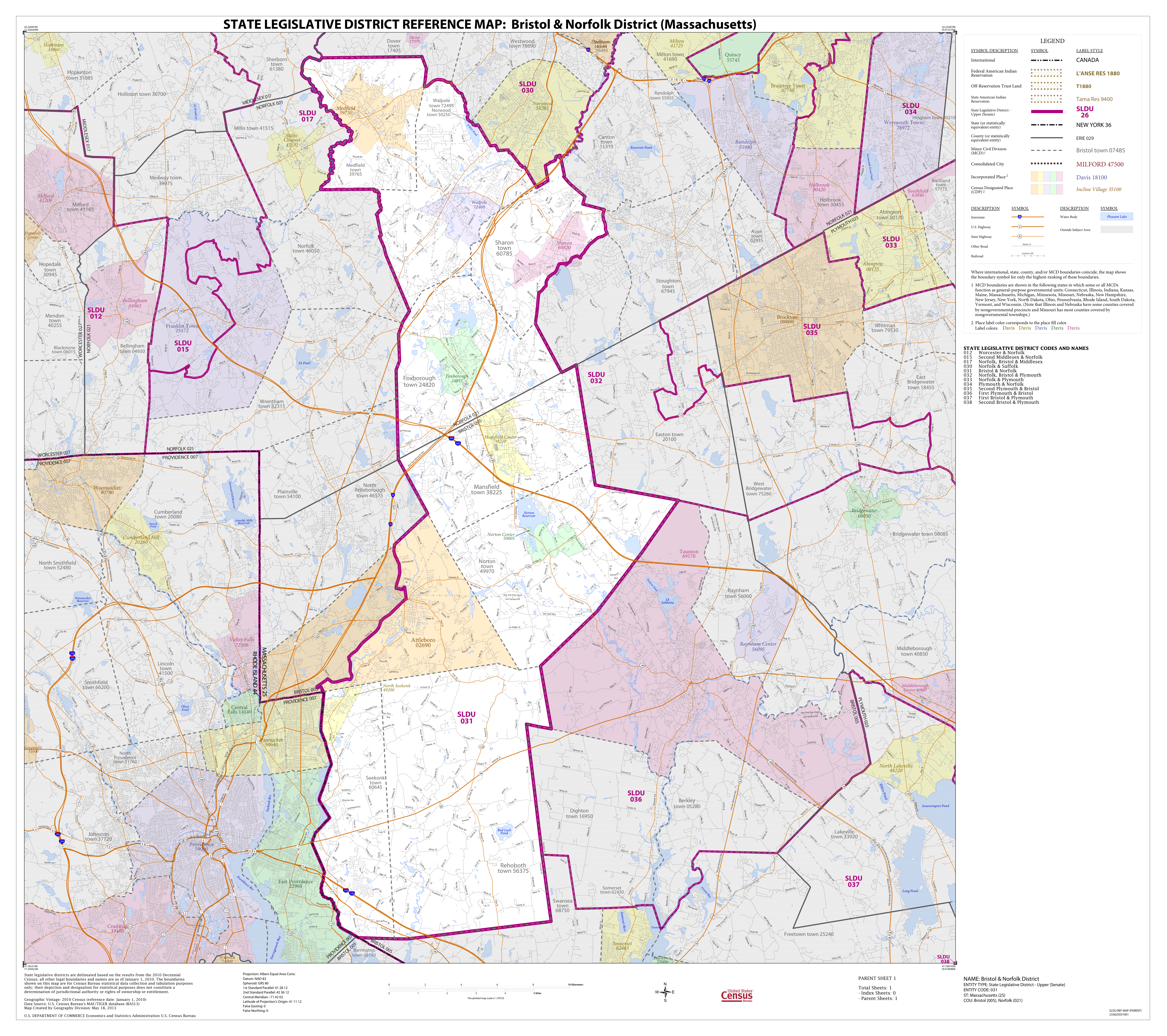
Map of Massachusetts Senate's Bristol and Norfolk district, based on the 2010 United States census.

Bristol and Norfolk is a district of the Massachusetts Senate. It covers 17.0% of Bristol County and 9.5% of Norfolk County population in 2010. Democrat Paul Feeney of Foxborough has represented the district since 2017.

== Towns represented ==
The district includes the following localities:

- Attleboro
- Foxborough
- Mansfield
- Medfield
- Norton
- Rehoboth
- Seekonk
- Sharon
- Walpole

The current district geographic boundary overlaps with those of the Massachusetts House of Representatives' 1st Bristol, 2nd Bristol, 4th Bristol, 14th Bristol, 8th Norfolk, 9th Norfolk, 11th Norfolk, 12th Norfolk, and 13th Norfolk districts.

== List of senators ==
Senator	Party	Years	Legis.	Electoral history
John Francis Parker	Republican	1975– 1979	169th 170th	Redistricted from 1st Bristol district. Re-elected in 1974. Re-elected in 1976. Redistricted to 1st Bristol district.
District eliminated in 1979. District restored in 2003.
Jo Ann Sprague	Republican	2003 – 2005	183rd	Redistricted from the Norfolk, Bristol and Plymouth district. Re-elected in 2002. Retired.
James E. Timilty	Democratic	2005–April 28, 2017	184th 185th 186th 187th 188th 189th	Elected in 2004. Re-elected in 2006. Re-elected in 2008. Re-elected in 2010. Re-elected in 2012. Re-elected in 2014. Re-elected in 2016. Resigned to become treasurer of Norfolk County.
Paul Feeney	Democratic	November 1, 2017– Present	190th 191st 192nd 193rd 194th	Elected in 2017. Re-elected in 2018. Re-elected in 2020. Re-elected in 2022. Re-elected in 2024.

== See also ==
- Bristol County districts of the Massachusetts House of Representatives: 1st, 2nd, 3rd, 4th, 5th, 6th, 7th, 8th, 9th, 10th, 11th, 12th, 13th, 14th
- Norfolk County districts of the Massachusetts House of Representatives: 1st, 2nd, 3rd, 4th, 5th, 6th, 7th, 8th, 9th, 10th, 11th, 12th, 13th, 14th, 15th
