= William Whittem Jenness =

Massachusetts politician (1904–1976)

Member of the Massachusetts House of Representatives from the 2nd Norfolk district
- In office 1945–1958

Personal details
- Born: April 3, 1904 Quincy, Massachusetts, US
- Died: March 6, 1976 (aged 71) Quincy, Massachusetts, US
- Education: Harvard College (BA); Harvard Kennedy School (MPA)

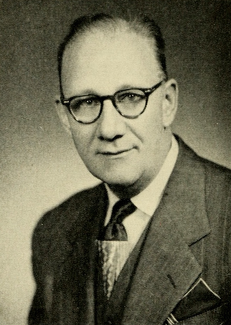
Portrait of William Whittem Jenness, member of the Massachusetts House of Representatives

William Whittem Jenness (April 3, 1904 – March 6, 1976) was an American politician who was the member of the Massachusetts House of Representatives from the 2nd Norfolk district.
