= Freyda Koplow =

American politician (1907–1999)

Freyda Peck Koplow
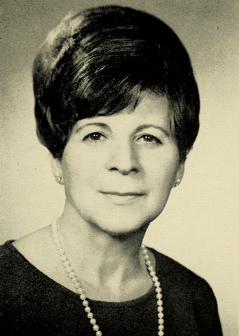
- Koplow, circa 1967

Member of the Massachusetts House of Representatives from the 10th Norfolk district
- In office 1955–1967

Personal details
- Born: October 26, 1907 Willimantic, Connecticut
- Died: January 10, 1999 (aged 91) Waltham, Massachusetts
- Party: Republican

Freyda Peck Koplow (October 26, 1907 – January 10, 1999) was an American politician who served in the Massachusetts House of Representatives and as banking commissioner for the state of Massachusetts.

== Biography ==
Koplow was born on October 26, 1907, in Willimantic, Connecticut. A member of the League of Women Voters, she was first elected to the Massachusetts House of Representatives in 1955, and served in the House of Representatives until 1967, where she was known for campaigning for seat belt laws in Massachusetts. She was appointed by Governor John Volpe as the state's first female banking commissioner, a position which she held until 1975. She was paid $15,000 per year.

In 1975, President Gerald Ford appointed Koplow to the Presidential Commission on Electronic Funds Transfer. The Commission was responsible for investigating ATMs and other forms of electronic banking at a time when these technologies were beginning to become commonplace.

Koplow died on January 10, 1999 in Waltham, Massachusetts, at the age of 91.
