= Massachusetts House of Representatives' 13th Norfolk district =

American legislative district

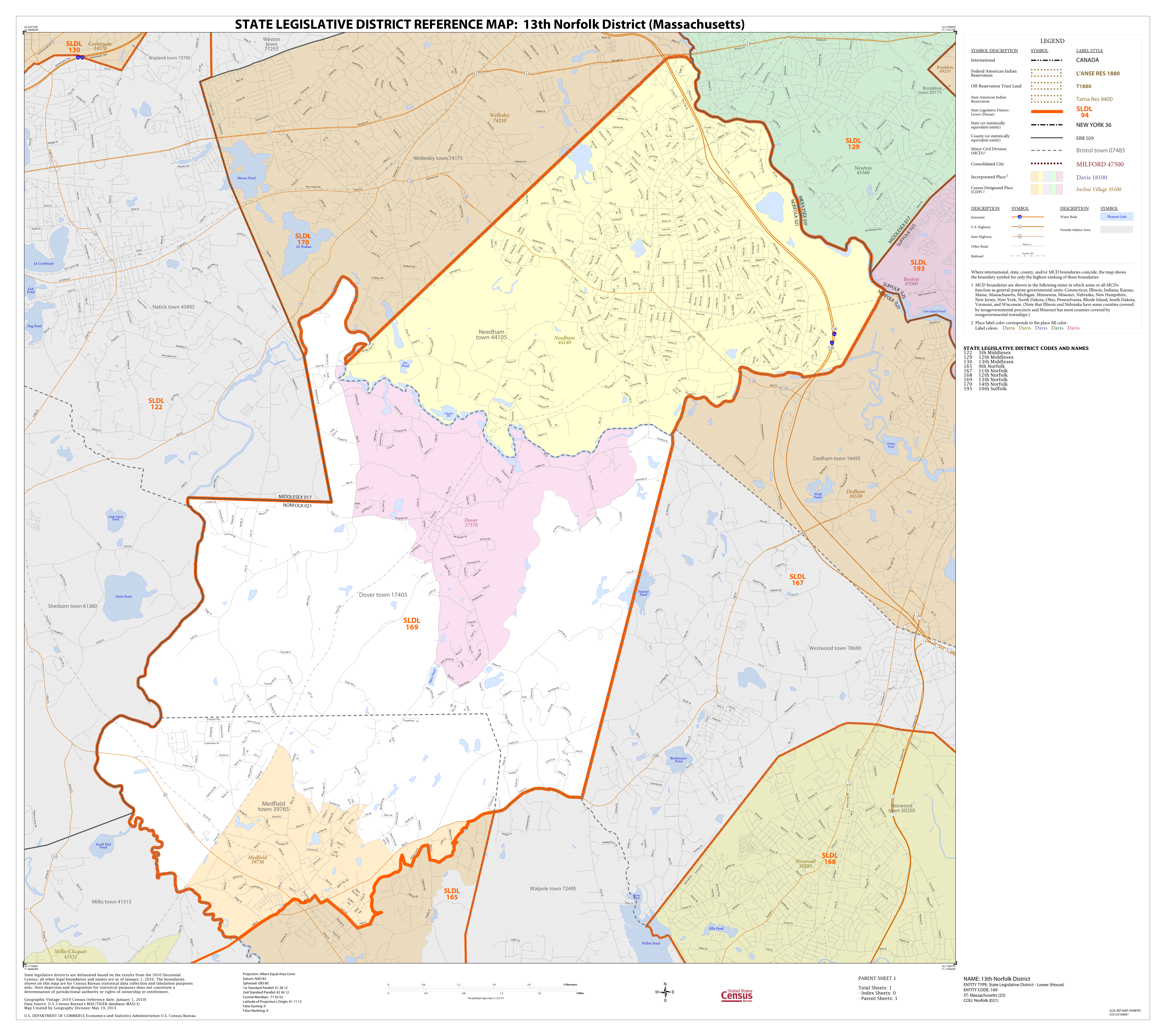
Map of Massachusetts House of Representatives' 13th Norfolk district, based on the 2010 United States census.

Massachusetts House of Representatives' 13th Norfolk district in the United States is one of 160 legislative districts included in the lower house of the Massachusetts General Court. It covers part of Norfolk County. Democrat Joshua Tarsky has represented the district since 2025.

== Towns represented ==
The district includes the following localities:

- Dover
- part of Medfield
- Needham

The current district geographic boundary overlaps with those of the Massachusetts Senate's Bristol and Norfolk district, Norfolk and Suffolk district, and Norfolk, Bristol and Middlesex district.

=== Former locales ===
The district previously covered:

- Bellingham, circa 1872
- Franklin, circa 1872

== Representatives ==
- Stephen W. Richardson, circa 1858
- Horace Rockwood, circa 1859
- Jack H. Backman, 1965-1970
- John A. Businger, 1971-1974
- Michael Dukakis
- Charles M. McGowan, circa 1975
- Lida E. Harkins, 1989-2011
- Denise C. Garlick, 2011-2025
- Joshua Tarsky, 2025-Present

== See also ==
- List of Massachusetts House of Representatives elections
- Other Norfolk County districts of the Massachusetts House of Representatives: 1st, 2nd, 3rd, 4th, 5th, 6th, 7th, 8th, 9th, 10th, 11th, 12th, 14th, 15th
- List of Massachusetts General Courts
- List of former districts of the Massachusetts House of Representatives

== Images ==
Portraits of legislators

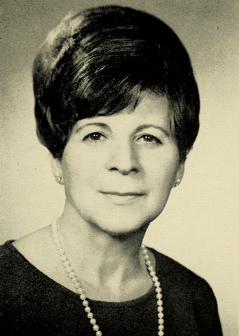
Freyda Koplow

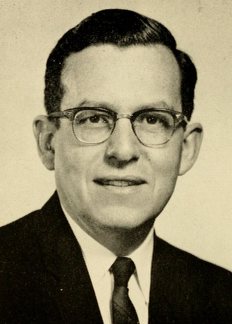
Jack Backman

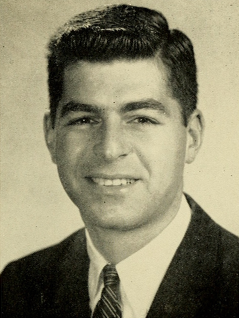
Michael Dukakis

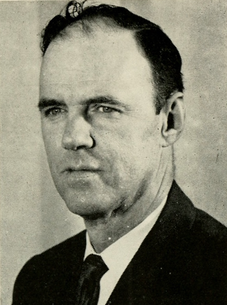
Charles McGowan

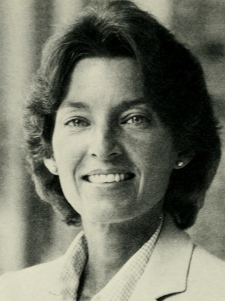
Ellen M. Canavan

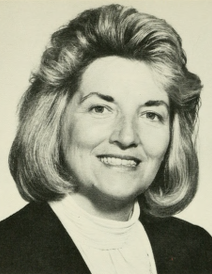
Lida Eisenstadt Harkins
