= Massachusetts House of Representatives' 1st Norfolk district =

American legislative district

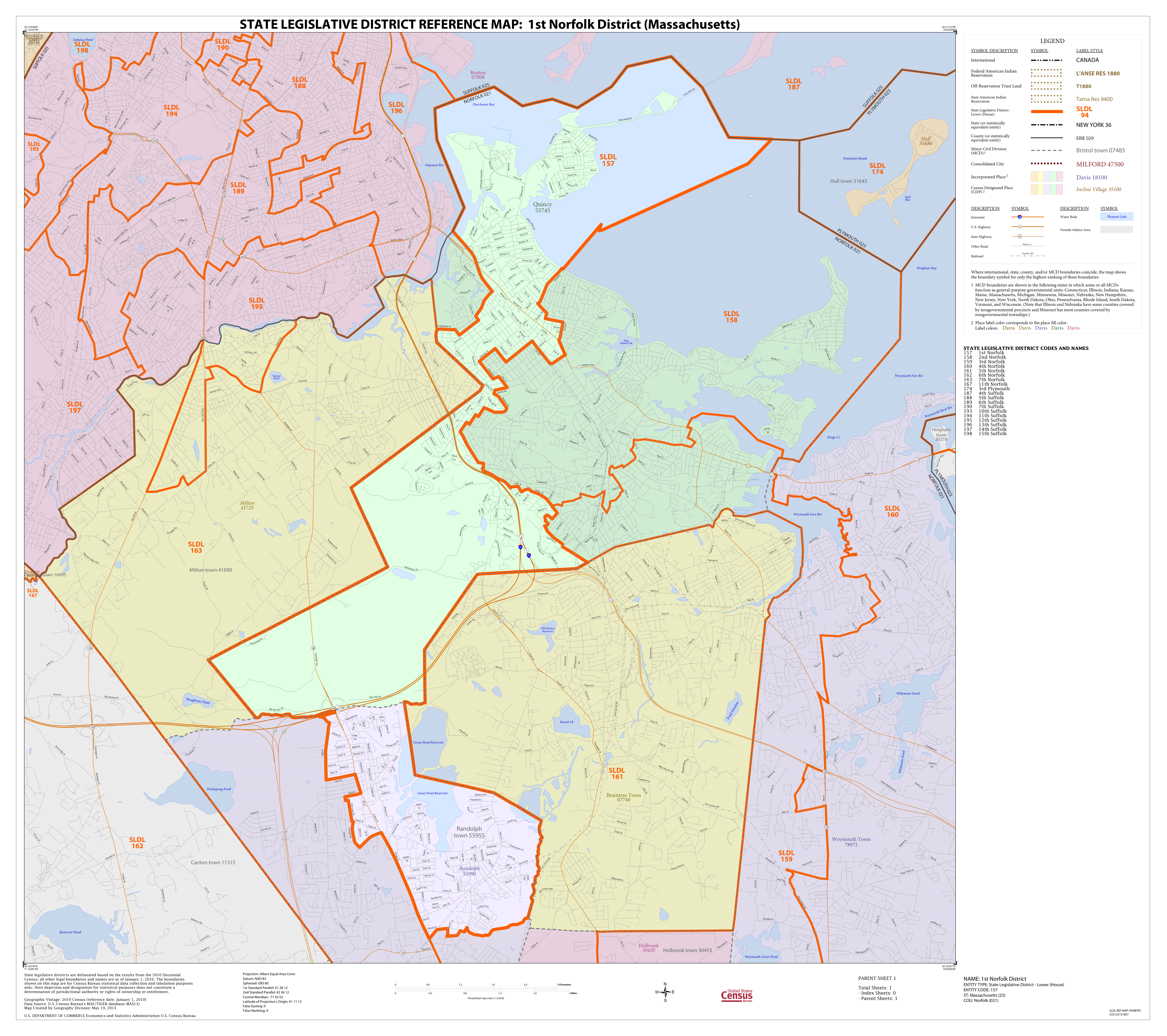
Map of Massachusetts House of Representatives' 1st Norfolk district, based on the 2010 United States census.

Massachusetts House of Representatives' 1st Norfolk district in the United States is one of 160 legislative districts included in the lower house of the Massachusetts General Court. It covers part of Norfolk County. Democrat Bruce Ayers of Quincy has represented the district since 1999.

== Locales represented ==
The district includes the following localities:

- part of Quincy
- Randolph

The current district geographic boundary overlaps with those of the Massachusetts Senate's Norfolk and Plymouth district and Norfolk, Bristol and Plymouth district.

=== Former locales ===
The district previously covered:

- Dedham, circa 1872, 1927
- Needham, circa 1927
- Wellesley, circa 1927

== Representatives ==
- Ezra W. Taft, circa 1858-1859
- Frank A. Fales, circa 1888
- George S. Winslow, 1892
- Joseph Soliday, circa 1908
- John Hirsch, circa 1918
- Samuel H. Wragg, circa 1920
- James M. McCracken, circa 1935
- Mason Sears, circa 1935
- Leslie Bradley Cutler, circa 1939
- Alfred Keith, circa 1945
- Avery Gilkerson, circa 1945
- John Taylor, circa 1945
- Clifton H. Baker, circa 1951
- Carter Lee, circa 1951
- Amelio Della Chiesa, circa 1953
- Joseph Brett, circa 1967
- Walter Hannon, circa 1967
- Thomas F. Brownell
- Robert A. Cerasoli, 1975-1979
- Michael W. Morrissey, 1979–1993
- Michael G. Bellotti, 1993–1999
- Bruce J. Ayers, 1999-current

== See also ==
- List of Massachusetts House of Representatives elections
- Other Norfolk County districts of the Massachusetts House of Representatives: 2nd, 3rd, 4th, 5th, 6th, 7th, 8th, 9th, 10th, 11th, 12th, 13th, 14th, 15th
- List of Massachusetts General Courts
- List of former districts of the Massachusetts House of Representatives

== Images ==
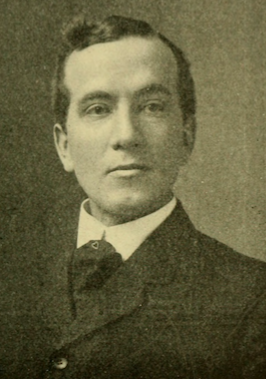
Joseph Soliday

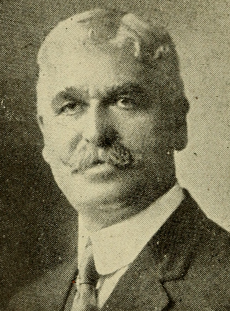
John Hirsch

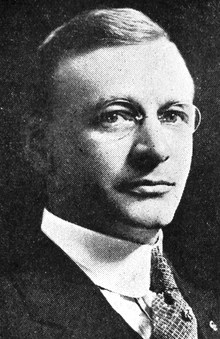
Samuel Wragg

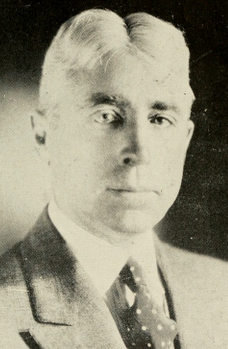
James McCracken

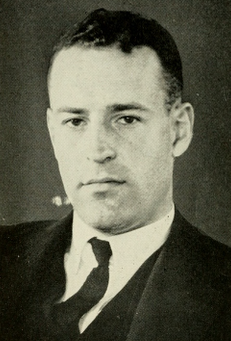
Mason Sears

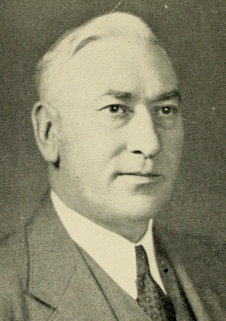
Alfred Keith

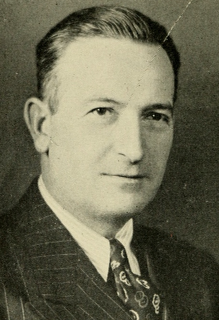
Avery Gilkerson

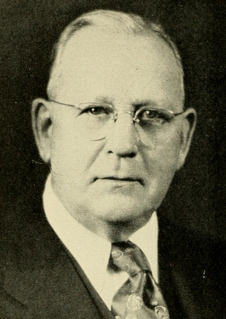
John Taylor

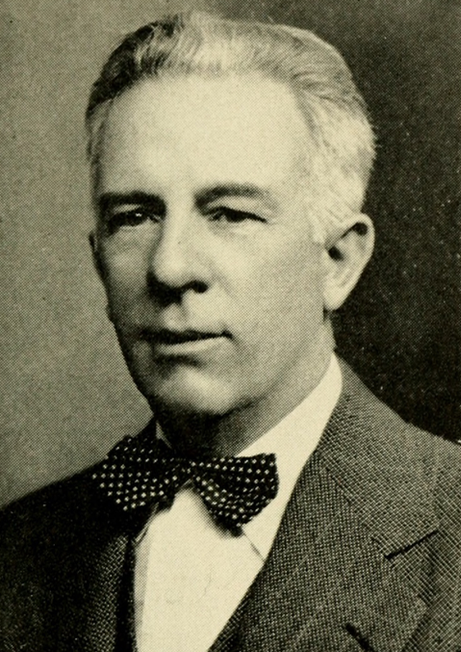
Amelio Della Chiesa

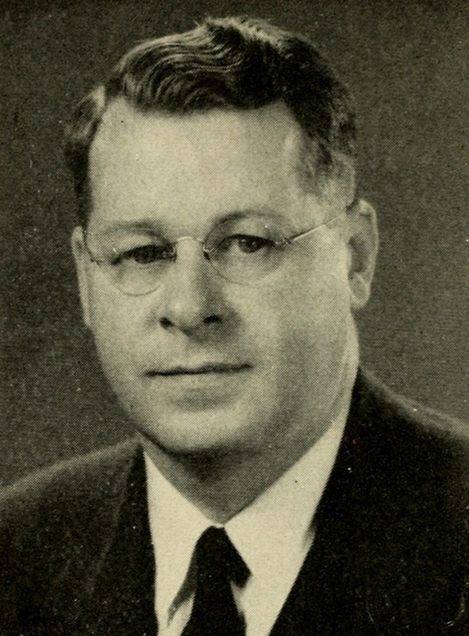
Carter Lee

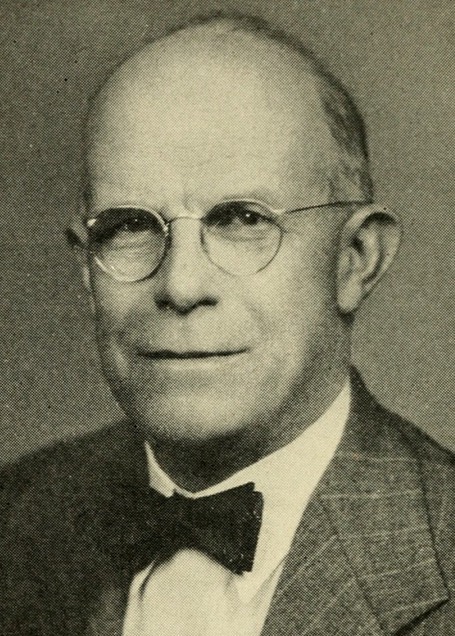
Clifton Baker

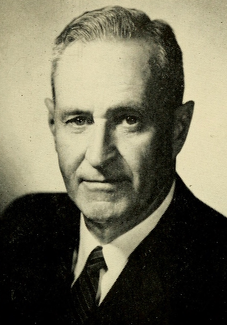
Joseph Brett

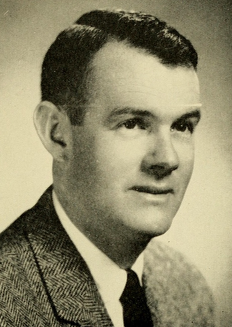
Walter Hannon

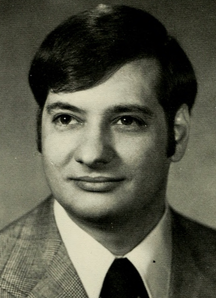
Robert Cerasoli

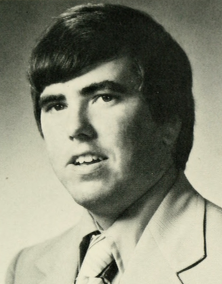
Michael Morrissey

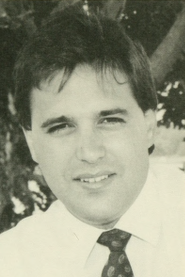
Michael Bellotti
