= Massachusetts House of Representatives' 12th Norfolk district =

American legislative district

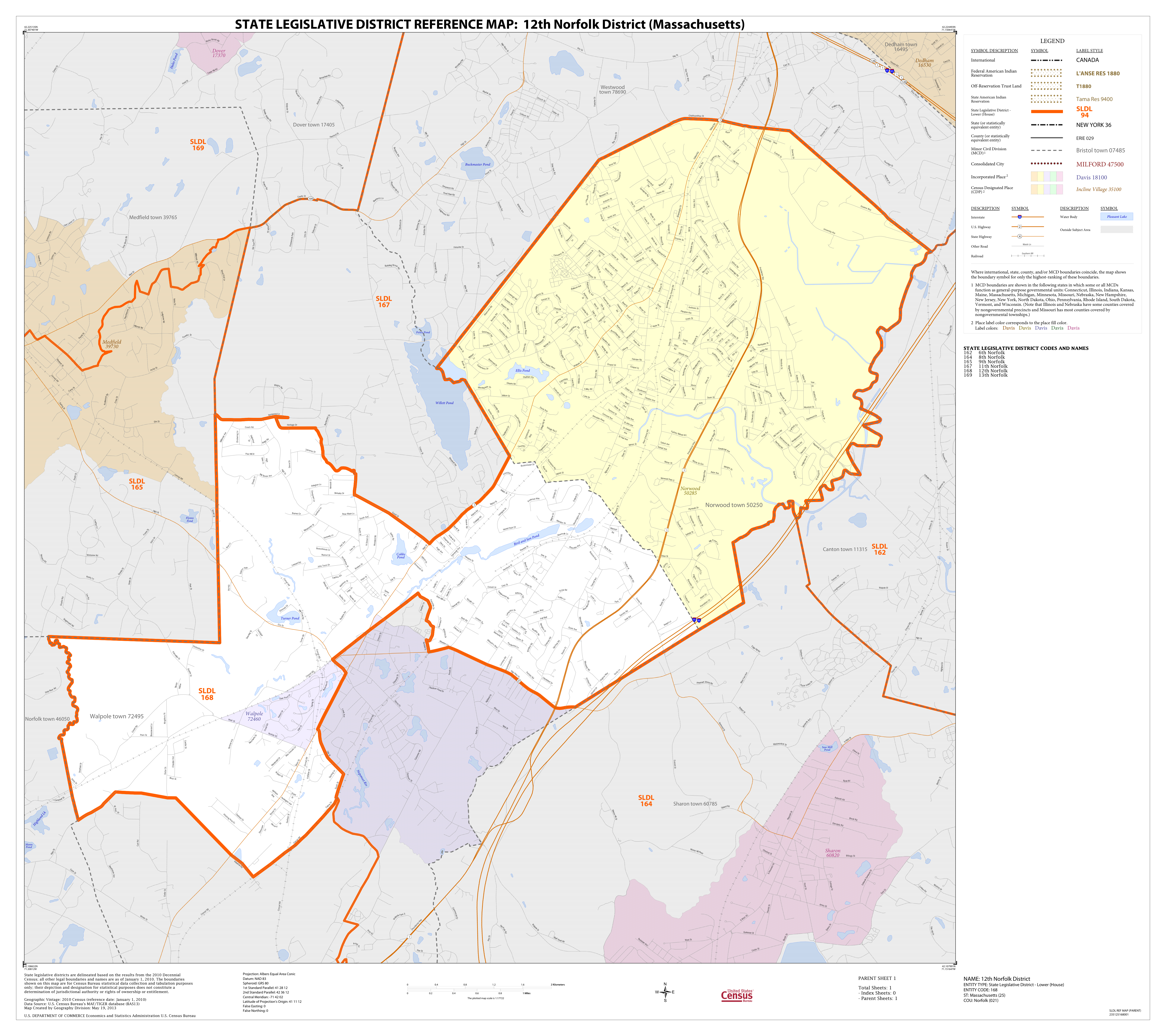
Map of Massachusetts House of Representatives' 12th Norfolk district, based on the 2010 United States census.

Massachusetts House of Representatives' 12th Norfolk district in the United States is one of 160 legislative districts included in the lower house of the Massachusetts General Court. It covers part of Norfolk County. Democrat John Rogers of Norwood has represented the district since 1993. Candidates running for this district seat in the 2020 Massachusetts general election include Mike Dooley.

== Towns represented ==
The district includes the following localities:

- Norwood
- part of Walpole

The current district geographic boundary overlaps with those of the Massachusetts Senate's Bristol and Norfolk district and Norfolk and Suffolk district.

=== Former locales ===
The district previously covered:

- Foxborough, circa 1872
- Medway, circa 1872
- Wrentham, circa 1872

== Representatives ==
- William B. Boyd, circa 1858
- Daniels Carpenter, circa 1858
- Edward C. Craig, circa 1859
- William H. Temple, circa 1859
- Maurice E. Ronayne, Jr., circa 1975
- Gregory Sullivan
- John H. Rogers, 1993-current

== See also ==
- List of Massachusetts House of Representatives elections
- Other Norfolk County districts of the Massachusetts House of Representatives: 1st, 2nd, 3rd, 4th, 5th, 6th, 7th, 8th, 9th, 10th, 11th, 13th, 14th, 15th
- List of Massachusetts General Courts
- List of former districts of the Massachusetts House of Representatives

== Images ==
Portraits of legislators

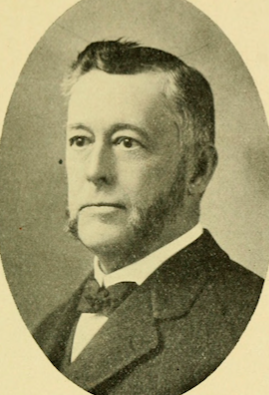
Frederick Lane

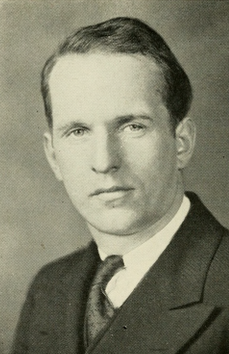
Henry McLaren

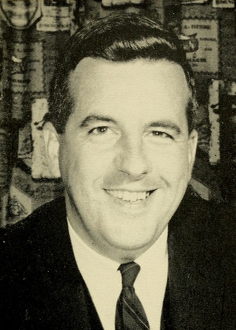
John St. Cyr

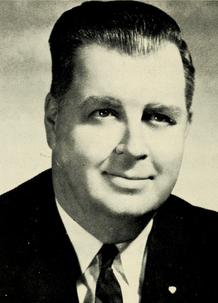
Maurice Ronayne

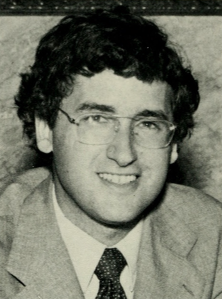
Gregory Sullivan

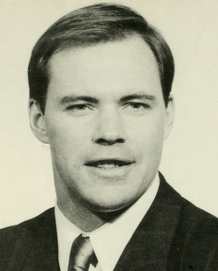
John Rogers
