= Massachusetts House of Representatives' 8th Norfolk district =

American legislative district

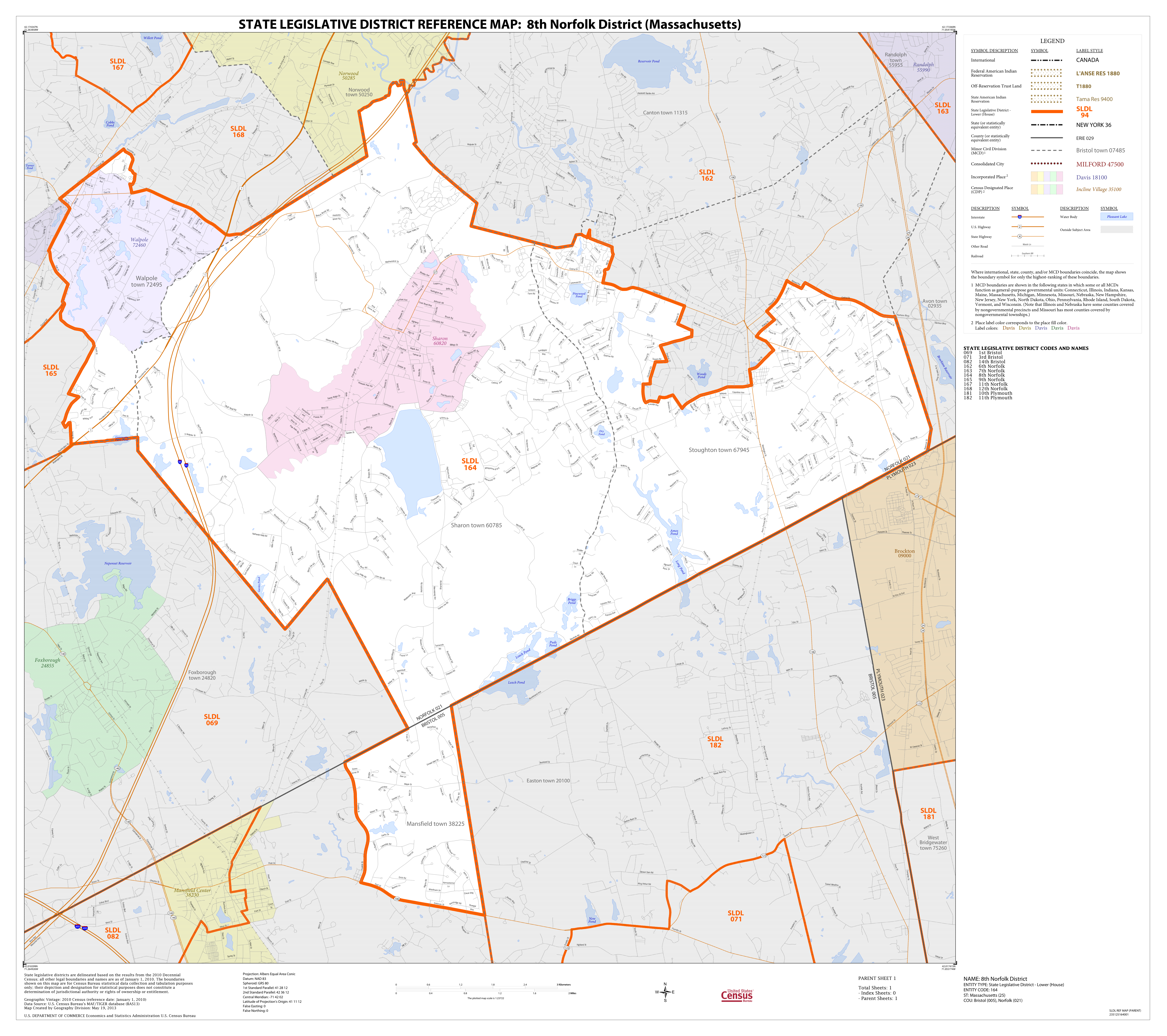
Map of Massachusetts House of Representatives' 8th Norfolk district, based on the 2010 United States census.

Massachusetts House of Representatives' 8th Norfolk district in the United States is one of 160 legislative districts included in the lower house of the Massachusetts General Court. It covers parts of Bristol County and Norfolk County. Democrat Lou Kafka of Stoughton represented the district from 1991 to 2020. Since January 2021, the district has been represented by Ted Philips of Sharon.

== Towns represented ==
The district includes the following localities:

- part of Mansfield
- Sharon
- part of Stoughton
- part of Walpole

The current district geographic boundary overlaps with those of the Massachusetts Senate's Bristol and Norfolk district and Norfolk, Bristol and Plymouth district.

=== Former locales ===
The district previously covered:

- Norwood, circa 1927
- Weymouth, circa 1872

== Representatives ==
- Lot W. Bicknell, circa 1858
- Nathaniel Shaw, circa 1858
- Elias S. Beals, circa 1859
- Daniel Lovell, circa 1859
- Charles W. Seavey, circa 1888
- Elijah Baron Stowe, circa 1888
- Frederic W. Kingman, circa 1920
- Frank D. McCarthy, circa 1951
- Andrew H. Card, Jr., circa 1975
- William Richard Keating, 1979–1985
- Marjorie Clapprood, 1985–1991
- Louis L. Kafka, 1991-2020
- Ted Philips, 2020–present

== See also ==
- List of Massachusetts House of Representatives elections
- Other Norfolk County districts of the Massachusetts House of Representatives: 1st, 2nd, 3rd, 4th, 5th, 6th, 7th, 9th, 10th, 11th, 12th, 13th, 14th, 15th
- List of Massachusetts General Courts
- List of former districts of the Massachusetts House of Representatives

== Images ==
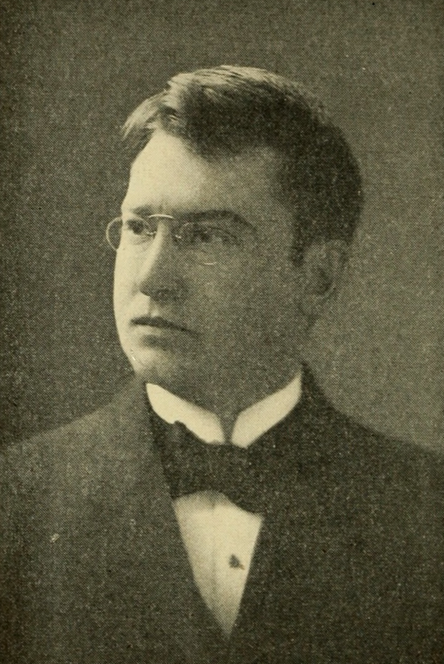
Louis Flye

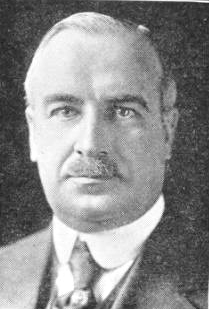
Frank Allen

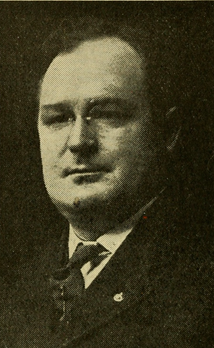
George Frederick James

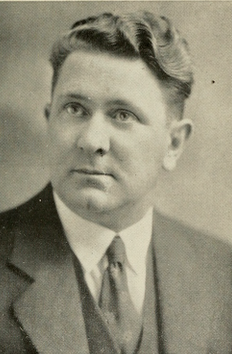
Frank Coughlin

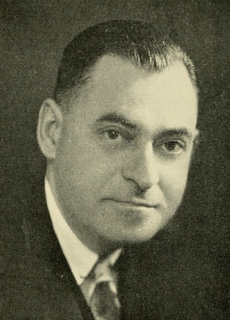
Frank McCarthy

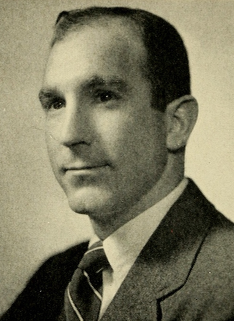
William Nourse

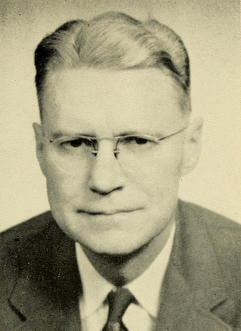
Daniel Rider

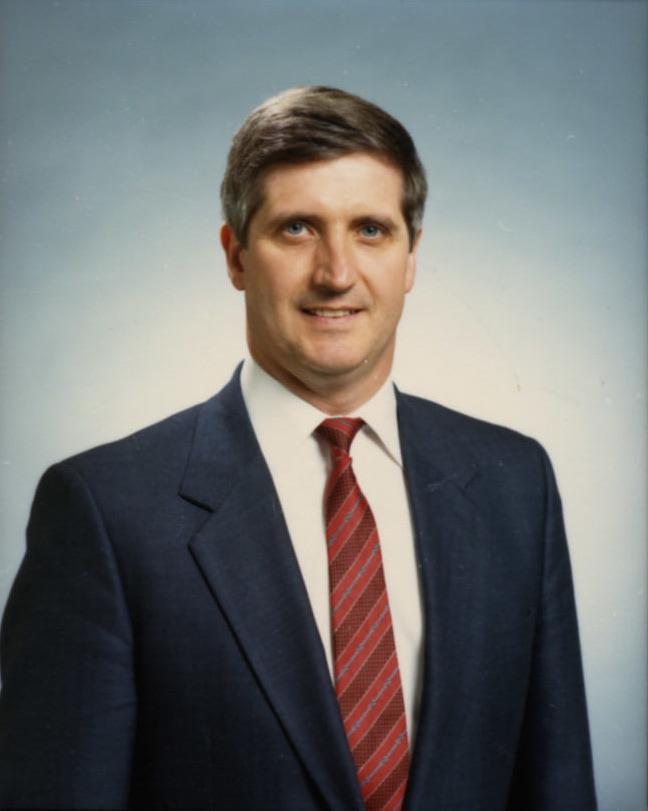
Andrew Card

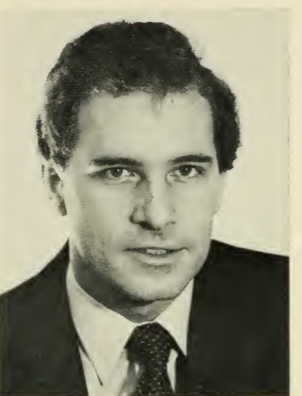
William Keating

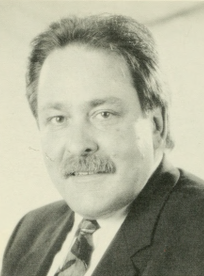
Louis Kafka
