= Massachusetts House of Representatives' 11th Norfolk district =

American legislative district

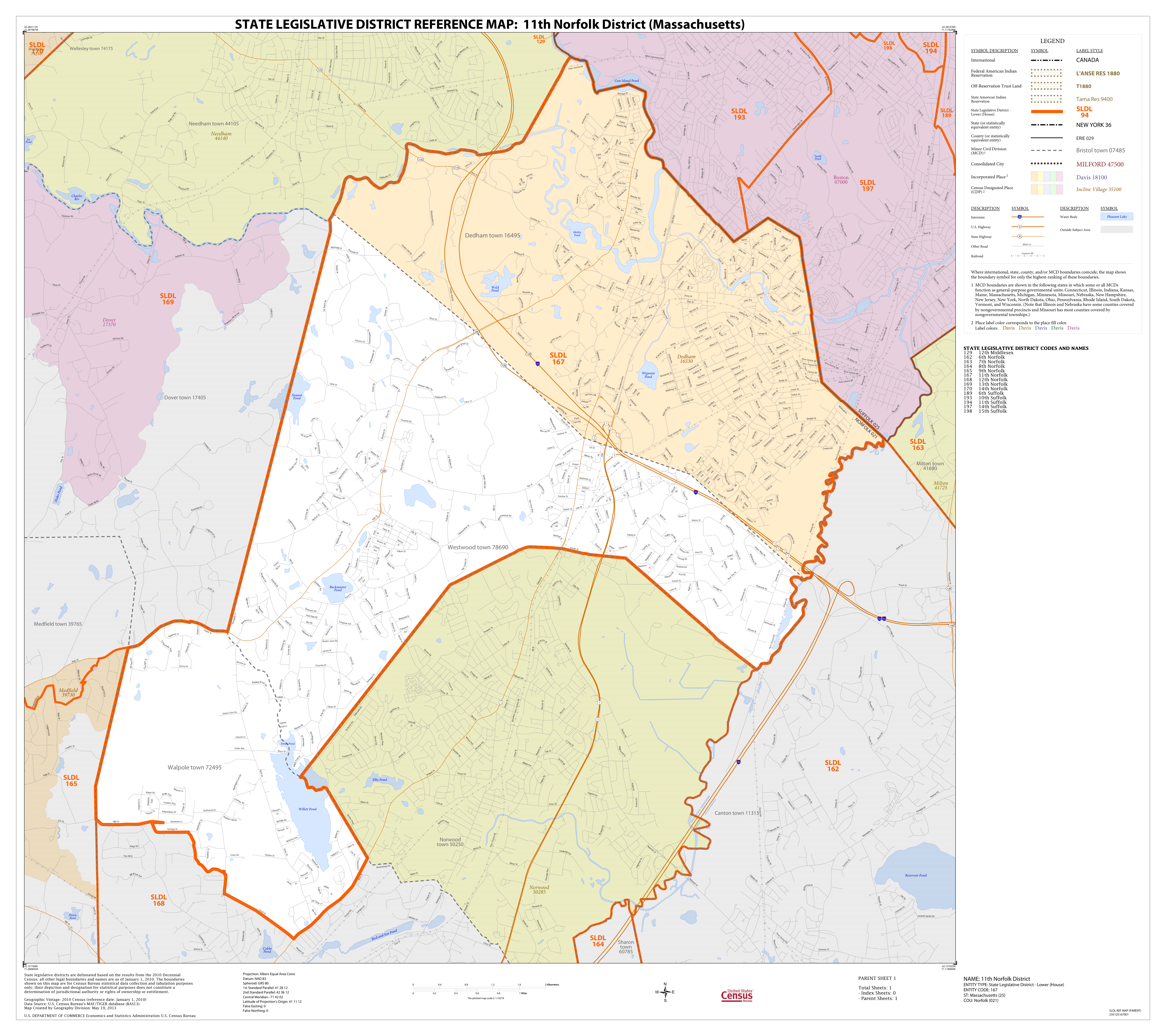
Map of Massachusetts House of Representatives' 11th Norfolk district, based on the 2010 United States census.

Massachusetts House of Representatives' 11th Norfolk district in the United States is one of 160 legislative districts included in the lower house of the Massachusetts General Court. It covers part of Norfolk County. Democrat Paul McMurtry of Dedham has represented the district since 2007.

== Towns represented ==
The current district geographic boundary overlaps with those of the Massachusetts Senate's Bristol and Norfolk district and Norfolk and Suffolk district.

- 1859-1867*:Canton, Milton, Walpole, Sharon
  (*)Two representatives
- 1869-1875*:Canton, Milton, Sharon, Walpole (including that part of Walpole incorporated into the towns of Norfolk and Norwood)
  (*)Two representatives
- 1975-1979:Stoughton
- 1981-1989:Dedham, Westwood Precincts 1 and 2
- 1989-1995:Dedham, Needham Precincts E and H, Westwood Precincts 1 and 3
- 1995-2003:Dedham, Westwood
- 2003 – Present:Dedham, Walpole Precinct 8, Westwood

== Representatives ==
Representative	Portrait	Years	Party	Hometown
David C. Ahearn		1965- 1975	Democratic	Norwood
Paul Goulston		1975- 1979	Democratic	Stoughton
Deborah R. Cochran		1979- 1983	Republican	Dedham
Marie-Louise Kehoe		1983- 1995	Democratic	Dedham
Maryanne Lewis		1995- 2003	Democratic	Dedham
Robert K. Coughlin		2003- January 29, 2007	Democratic	Dedham
Paul McMurtry		May 30, 2007 - Present	Democratic	Dedham

== See also ==
- List of Massachusetts House of Representatives elections
- Other Norfolk County districts of the Massachusetts House of Representatives: 1st, 2nd, 3rd, 4th, 5th, 6th, 7th, 8th, 9th, 10th, 12th, 13th, 14th, 15th
- List of Massachusetts General Courts
- List of former districts of the Massachusetts House of Representatives

== Images ==
Portraits of legislators

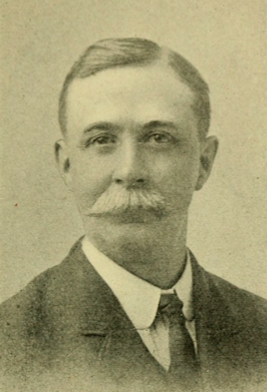
Fred Johnson

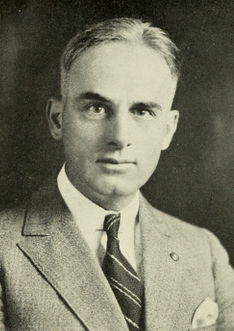
Martin Donahue

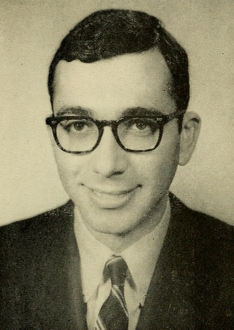
Alan Danovitch

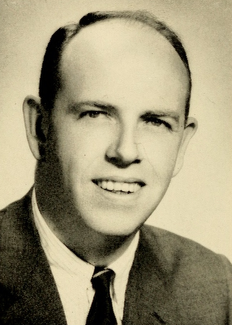
David Ahearn

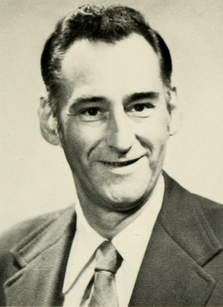
Paul Goulston

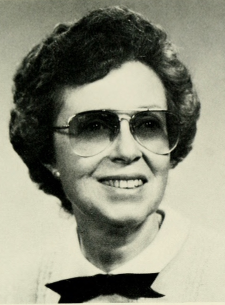
Marie Louise Kehoe

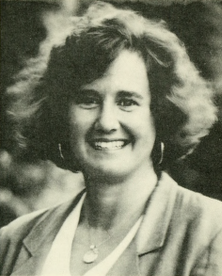
Maryanne Lewis

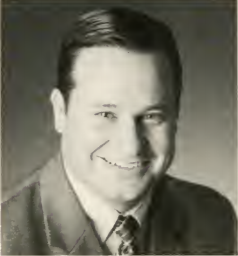
Robert Coughlin

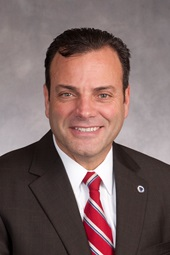
Paul McMurtry
