= Massachusetts House of Representatives' 3rd Norfolk district =

American legislative district

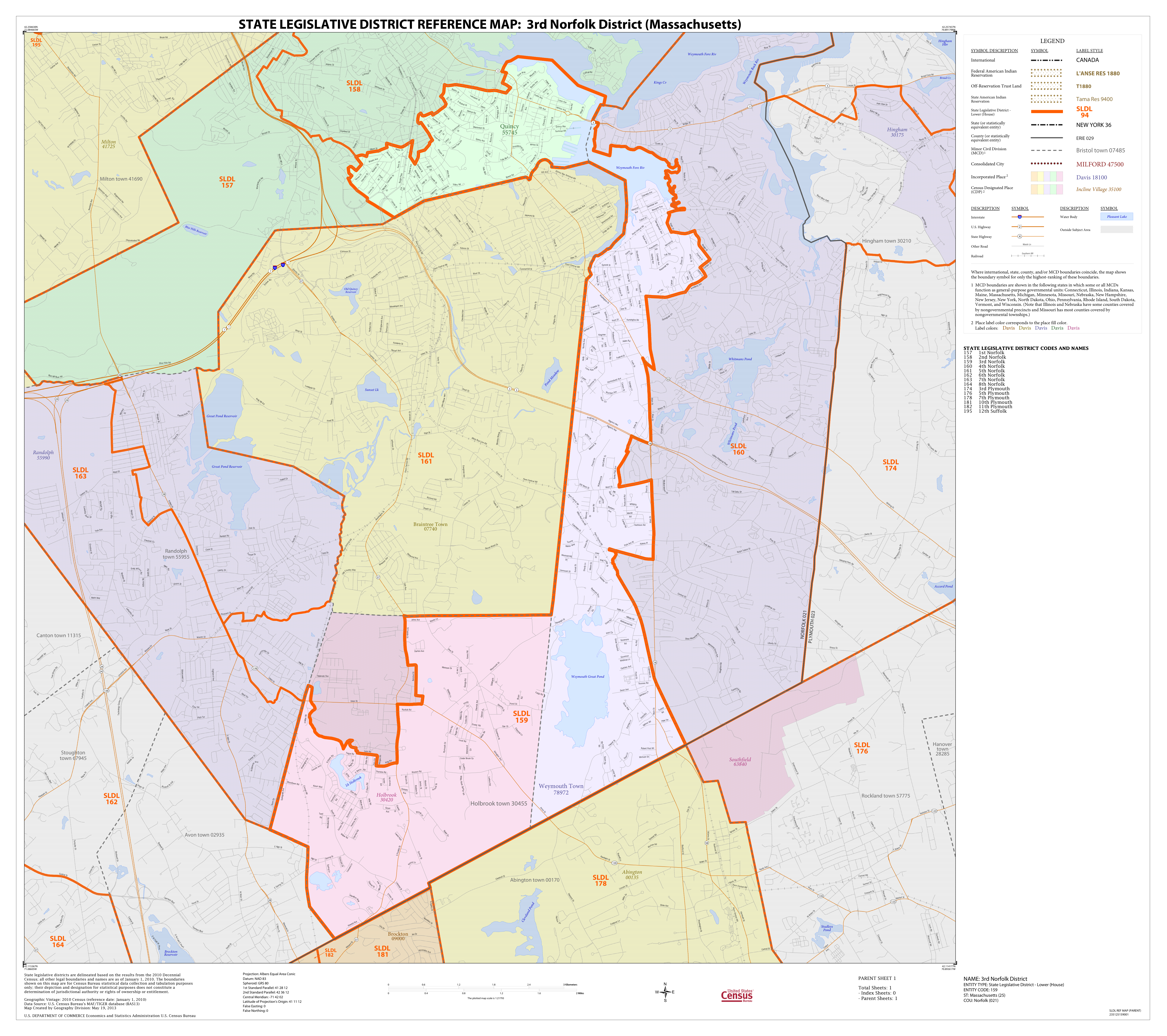
Map of Massachusetts House of Representatives' 3rd Norfolk district, based on the 2010 United States census.

Massachusetts House of Representatives' 3rd Norfolk district in the United States is one of 160 legislative districts included in the lower house of the Massachusetts General Court. It covers part of Norfolk County. Democrat Ron Mariano of Quincy has represented the district since 1991.

== Locales represented ==
The district includes the following localities:

- part of Holbrook
- part of Quincy
- part of Weymouth

The current district geographic boundary overlaps with those of the Massachusetts Senate's Norfolk and Plymouth district and Plymouth and Norfolk district.

=== Former locale ===
The district previously covered part of Roxbury, circa 1872.

== Representatives ==
- Thomas Parsons, circa 1858-1859
- Ferdinand Adolphus Wyman, circa 1888
- Russell T. Bates, circa 1920
- Allan R. McDonald, circa 1920
- John R. Nelson, circa 1920
- John L. Gallant, circa 1951
- Raymond P. Palmer, circa 1951
- Albert E. Roberts, circa 1951
- Joseph E. Brett, circa 1975
- Michael W. Morrissey
- Robert A. Cerasoli
- Ronald Mariano, 1991-current

== See also ==
- List of Massachusetts House of Representatives elections
- Other Norfolk County districts of the Massachusetts House of Representatives: 1st, 2nd, 4th, 5th, 6th, 7th, 8th, 9th, 10th, 11th, 12th, 13th, 14th, 15th
- List of Massachusetts General Courts
- List of former districts of the Massachusetts House of Representatives
