= Massachusetts House of Representatives' 2nd Norfolk district =

American legislative district

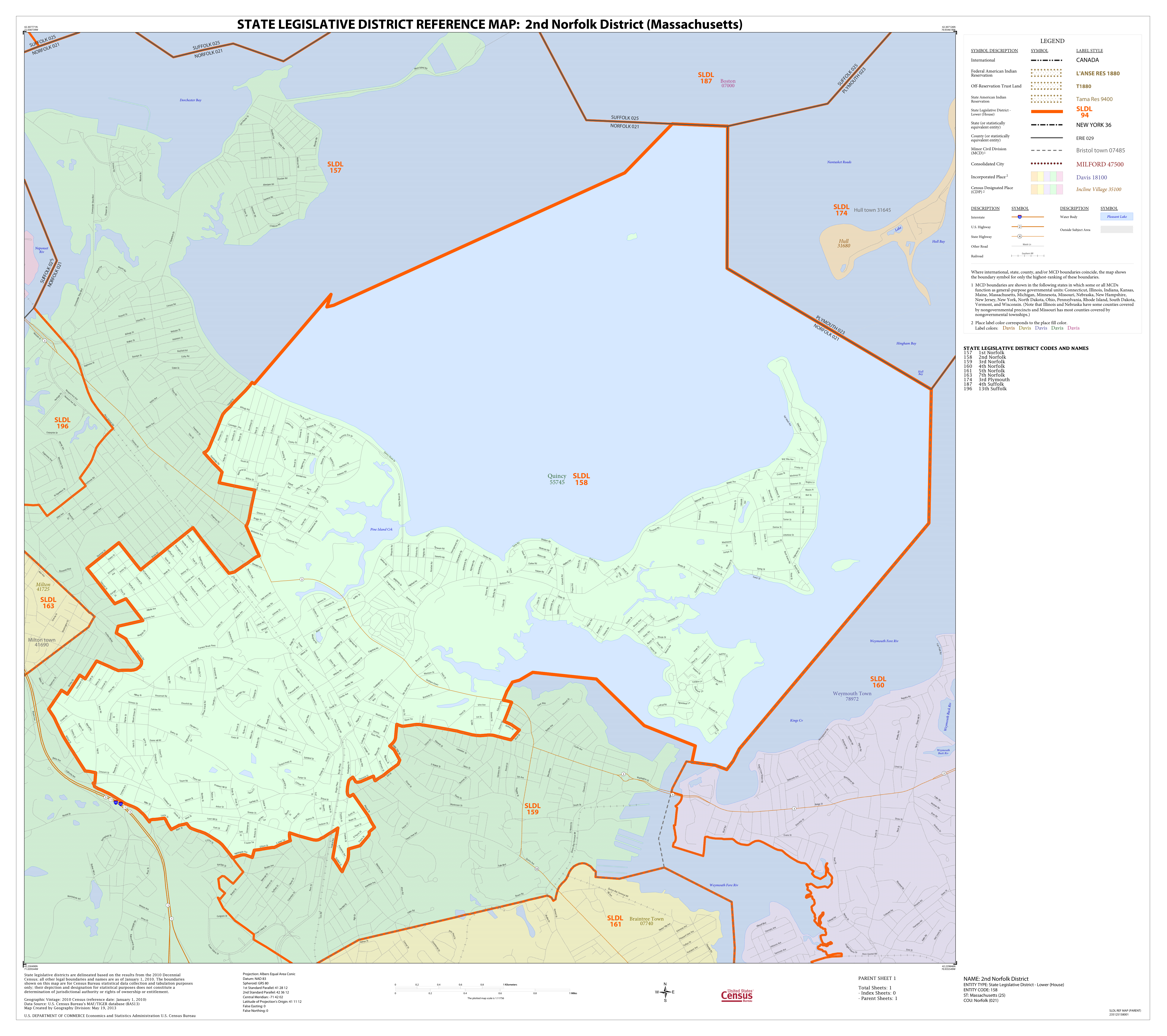
Map of Massachusetts House of Representatives' 2nd Norfolk district, based on the 2010 United States census.

Massachusetts House of Representatives' 2nd Norfolk district in the United States is one of 160 legislative districts included in the lower house of the Massachusetts General Court. It covers part of the city of Quincy in Norfolk County. Democrat Tackey Chan of Quincy has represented the district since 2011.

The current district geographic boundary overlaps with that of the Massachusetts Senate's Norfolk and Plymouth district.

== Representatives ==
- Abijah W. Draper, circa 1858
- William McCarty, circa 1859
- George Nathaniel Carpenter, circa 1888
- Erland F. Fish, circa 1920
- Renton Whidden, circa 1920
- William Whittem Jenness, circa 1951
- Thomas F. Brownell, circa 1975
- Arthur S. Tobin
- Tackey Chan, 2011-current

== Former locales ==
The district previously covered:

- Brookline, circa 1927
- West Roxbury, circa 1872

== See also ==
- List of Massachusetts House of Representatives elections
- Other Norfolk County districts of the Massachusetts House of Representatives: 1st, 3rd, 4th, 5th, 6th, 7th, 8th, 9th, 10th, 11th, 12th, 13th, 14th, 15th
- List of Massachusetts General Courts
- List of former districts of the Massachusetts House of Representatives

== Images ==
Portraits of legislators

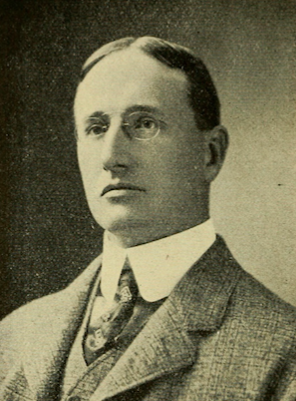
Joseph Walker

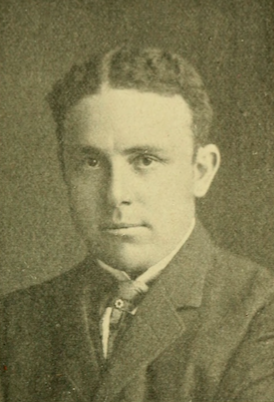
Norman White

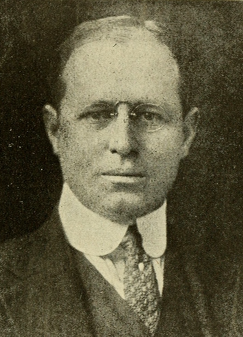
Charles Rowley

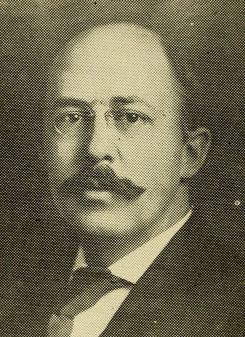
George Baldwin

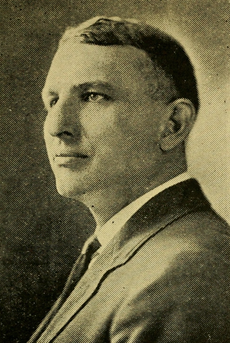
Erland Fish

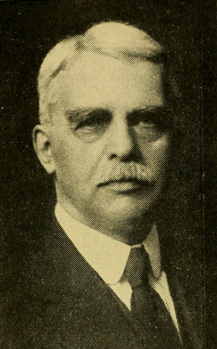
Renton Whidden

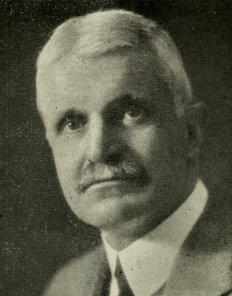
Albert Bigelow

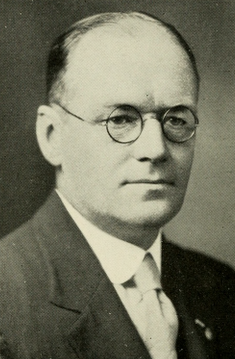
John Comerford

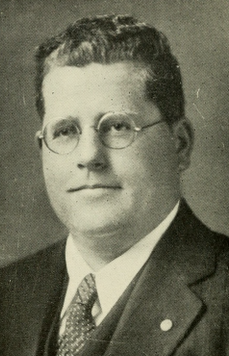
Philip Bowker

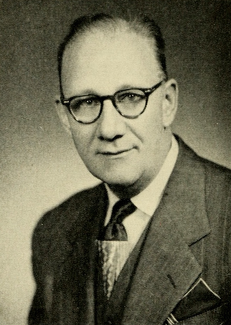
William Whittem Jenness

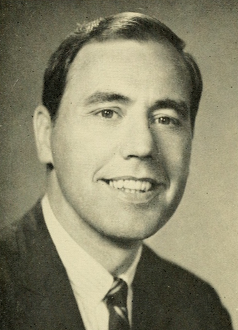
Arthur H. Tobin

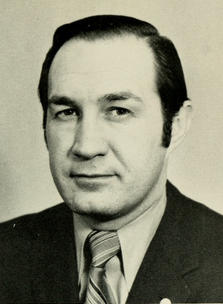
Thomas Brownell

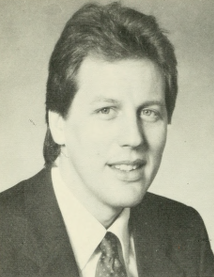
A. Stephen Tobin
