= Massachusetts House of Representatives' 10th Norfolk district =

American legislative district

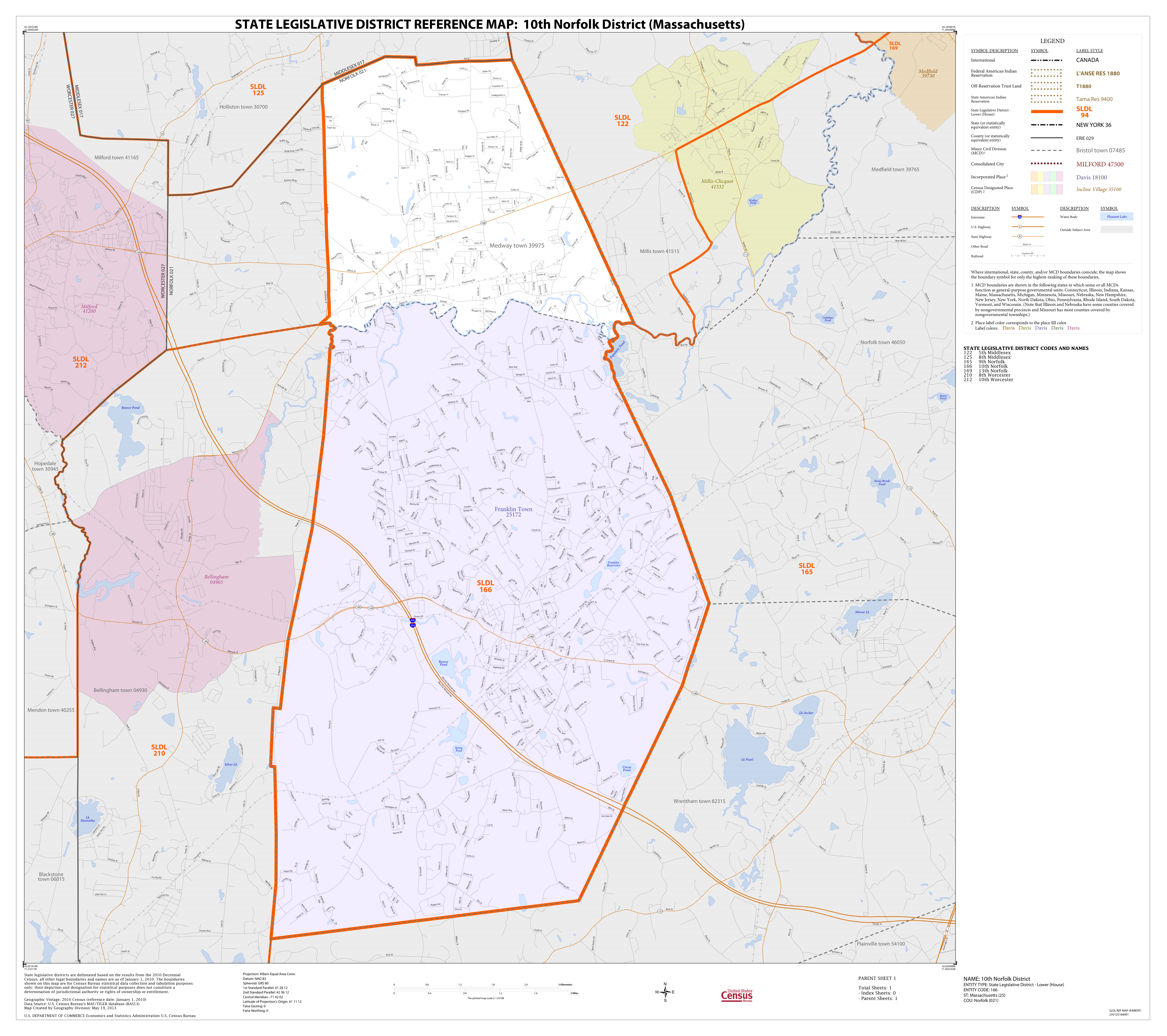
Map of Massachusetts House of Representatives' 10th Norfolk district, based on the 2010 United States census.

Massachusetts House of Representatives' 10th Norfolk district in the United States is one of 160 legislative districts included in the lower house of the Massachusetts General Court. It covers part of Norfolk County. Democrat Jeff Roy of Franklin has represented the district since 2013.

== Towns represented ==
The district includes the following localities:

- Franklin
- part of Medway

The current district geographic boundary overlaps with a portion of the Massachusetts Senate's Norfolk, Worcester and Middlesex district.

=== Former locales ===
The district previously covered:

- Canton, circa 1927
- Sharon, circa 1927
- Stoughton, circa 1872, 1927

== Representatives ==
- Cyrus S. Mann, circa 1858
- William H. Tucker, circa 1859
- George R. Ellis, circa 1920
- Richard James Allen, circa 1951
- Everett Murray Bowker, circa 1951
- Hibbard Richter, circa 1951
- Joseph J. Semensi, circa 1975
- James Vallee
- Jeffrey N. Roy, 2013-current

== See also ==
- List of Massachusetts House of Representatives elections
- Other Norfolk County districts of the Massachusetts House of Representatives: 1st, 2nd, 3rd, 4th, 5th, 6th, 7th, 8th, 9th, 11th, 12th, 13th, 14th, 15th
- List of Massachusetts General Courts
- List of former districts of the Massachusetts House of Representatives

== Images ==
Portraits of legislators

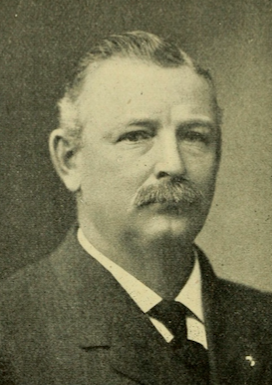
Frederick Fisher

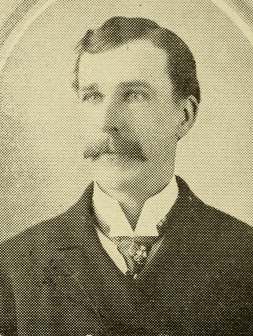
Clarence Crooks

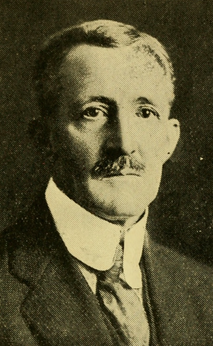
Harlie Thompson

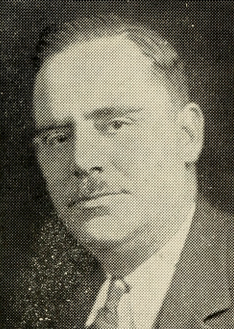
Richard Paul

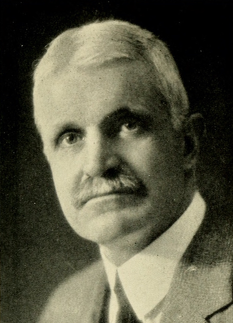
Albert Bigelow

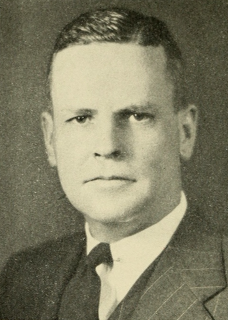
Everett Bowker

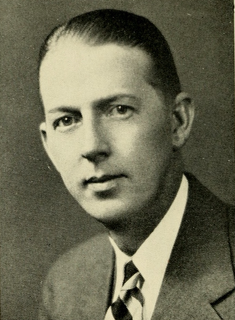
Richard Allen

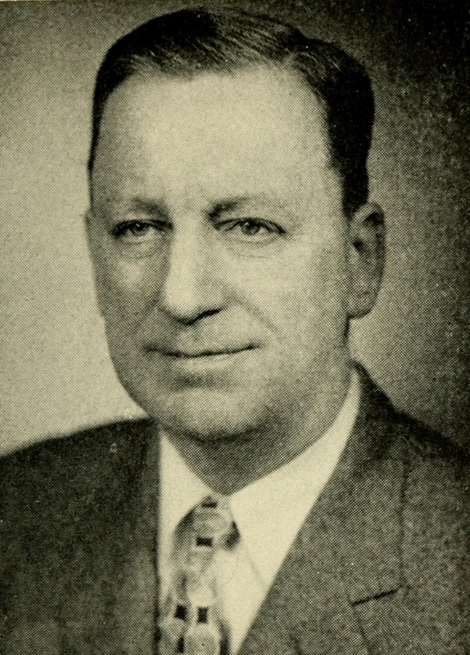
Hibbard Richter

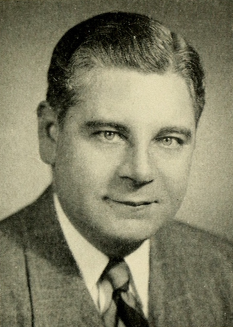
Joseph Silvano

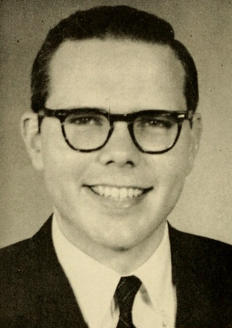
Charles Long

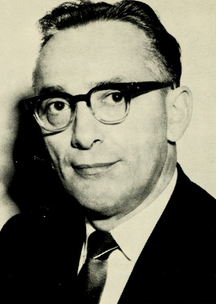
Joseph Semensi

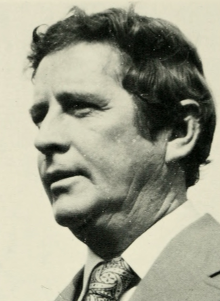
Charles Francis McNally

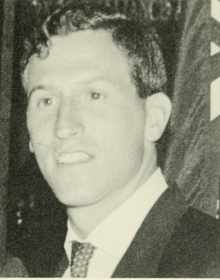
James Vallee
