= Massachusetts Senate's Worcester and Middlesex district =

American legislative district

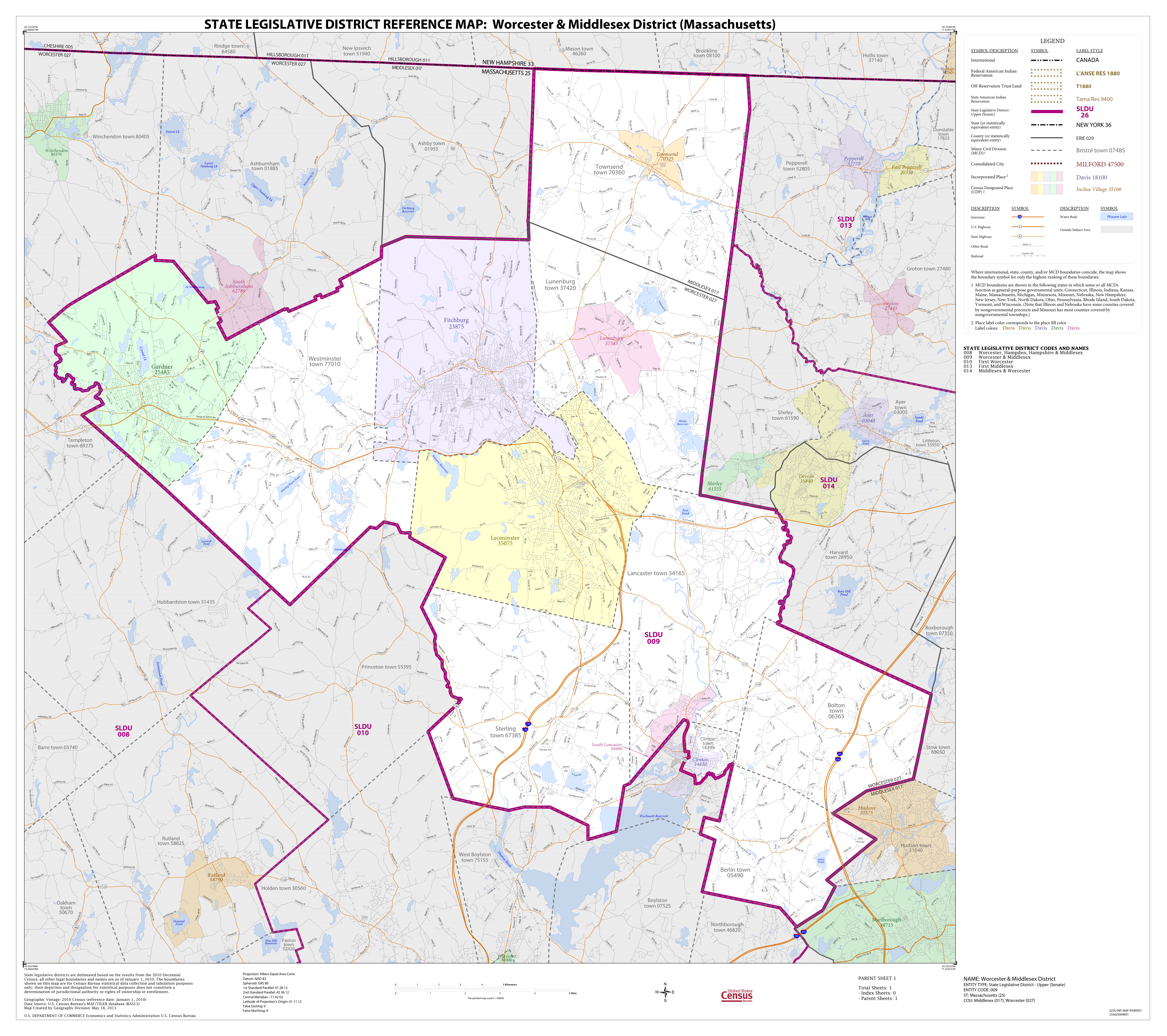
Map of Massachusetts Senate's Worcester and Middlesex district, based on the 2010 United States census.

Massachusetts Senate's Worcester and Middlesex district in the United States is one of 40 legislative districts of the Massachusetts Senate. It covered 0.6% of Middlesex County and 18.7% of Worcester County population in 2010. Democrat John Cronin of Lunenberg has represented the district since 2021.

== Locales represented ==
The district includes the following localities:

- Berlin
- Bolton
- Clinton
- Fitchburg
- Gardner
- Lancaster
- Leominster
- Lunenburg
- Sterling
- Townsend
- Westminster

== Senators ==
- Louis Peter Bertonazzi, circa 1985
- Robert A. Antonioni, circa 2002
- Jennifer Flanagan, 2009-2017
- Dean Tran, December 6, 2017-January, 2021
- John Cronin, 2021-current.

== See also ==
- List of Massachusetts Senate elections
- List of Massachusetts General Courts
- List of former districts of the Massachusetts Senate
- Other Worcester County districts of the Massachusett Senate: 1st, 2nd; Hampshire, Franklin and Worcester; Middlesex and Worcester; Worcester, Hampden, Hampshire and Middlesex; Worcester and Norfolk
- Middlesex County districts of the Massachusetts House of Representatives: 1st, 2nd, 3rd, 4th, 5th, 6th, 7th, 8th, 9th, 10th, 11th, 12th, 13th, 14th, 15th, 16th, 17th, 18th, 19th, 20th, 21st, 22nd, 23rd, 24th, 25th, 26th, 27th, 28th, 29th, 30th, 31st, 32nd, 33rd, 34th, 35th, 36th, 37th
- Worcester County districts of the Massachusetts House of Representatives: 1st, 2nd, 3rd, 4th, 5th, 6th, 7th, 8th, 9th, 10th, 11th, 12th, 13th, 14th, 15th, 16th, 17th, 18th
