= Massachusetts House of Representatives' 5th Worcester district =

American legislative district

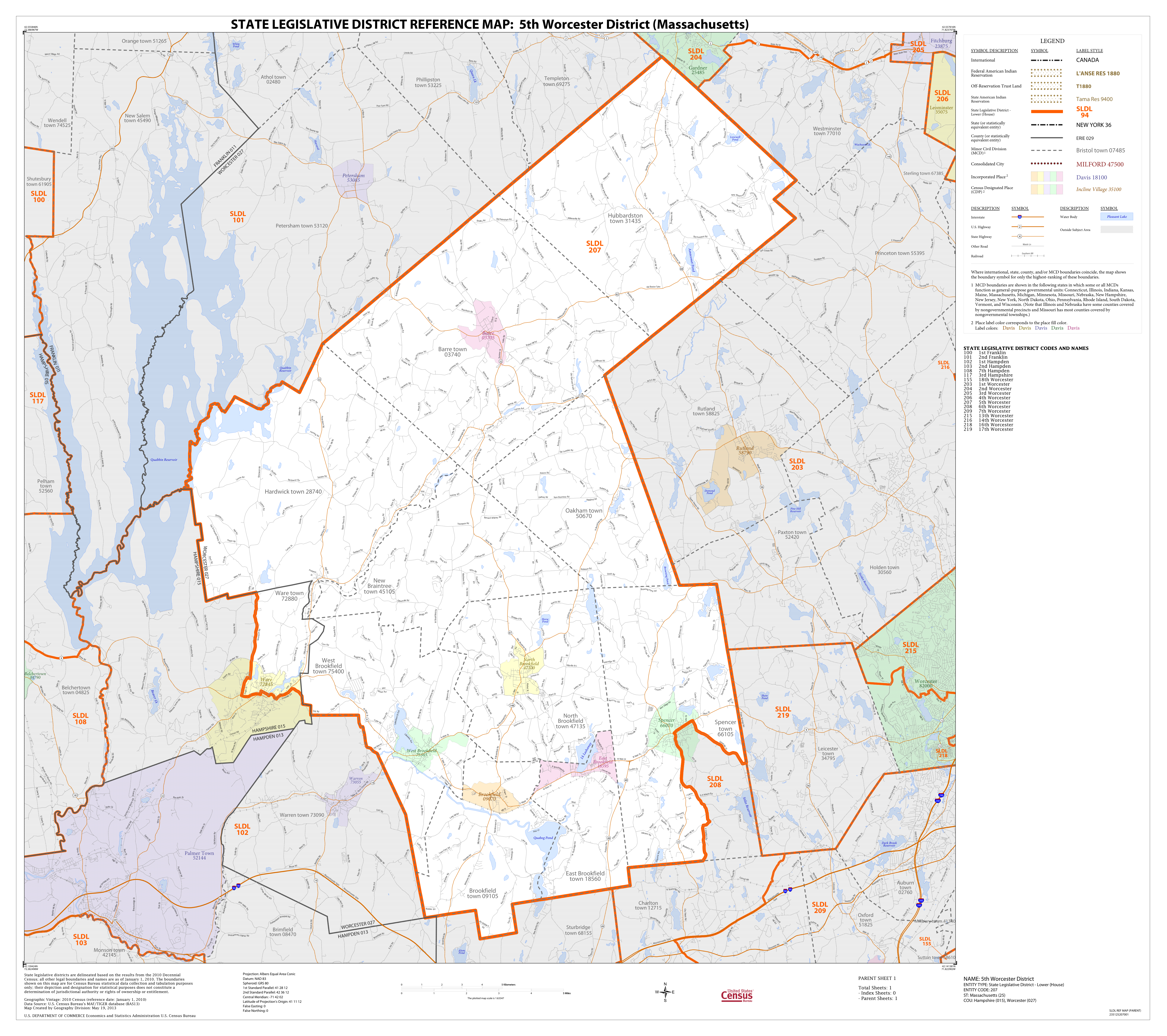
Map of Massachusetts House of Representatives' 5th Worcester district, based on the 2010 United States census.

Massachusetts House of Representatives' 5th Worcester district in the United States is one of 160 legislative districts included in the lower house of the Massachusetts General Court. It covers parts of Hampshire County and Worcester County. Republican Donnie Berthiaume of Spencer has represented the district since 2015.

== Towns represented ==
The district includes the following localities:

- Barre
- Brookfield
- East Brookfield
- Hardwick
- Hubbardston
- New Braintree
- North Brookfield
- Oakham
- part of Spencer
- part of Ware
- West Brookfield

The current district geographic boundary overlaps with that of the Massachusetts Senate's Worcester, Hampden, Hampshire and Middlesex district.

=== Former locales ===
The district previously covered:

- Fitchburg, circa 1872
- Leominster, circa 1872
- Lunenburg, circa 1872
- Westminster, circa 1872

== Representatives ==
- Thomas E. Glazier, circa 1858
- William Mayo, circa 1859
- George H. Coolidge, circa 1888
- Henry D. Haynes, circa 1888
- Wilfrid J. Lamoureux, circa 1920
- Leo Joseph Cournoyer, circa 1951
- John F. Farland, circa 1975
- Donald R. Berthiaume, Jr, 2015-current

== See also ==
- List of Massachusetts House of Representatives elections
- Other Worcester County districts of the Massachusetts House of Representatives: 1st, 2nd, 3rd, 4th, 6th, 7th, 8th, 9th, 10th, 11th, 12th, 13th, 14th, 15th, 16th, 17th, 18th
- Worcester County districts of the Massachusett Senate: 1st, 2nd; Hampshire, Franklin and Worcester; Middlesex and Worcester; Worcester, Hampden, Hampshire and Middlesex; Worcester and Middlesex; Worcester and Norfolk
- List of Massachusetts General Courts
- List of former districts of the Massachusetts House of Representatives

== Images ==
Portraits of legislators

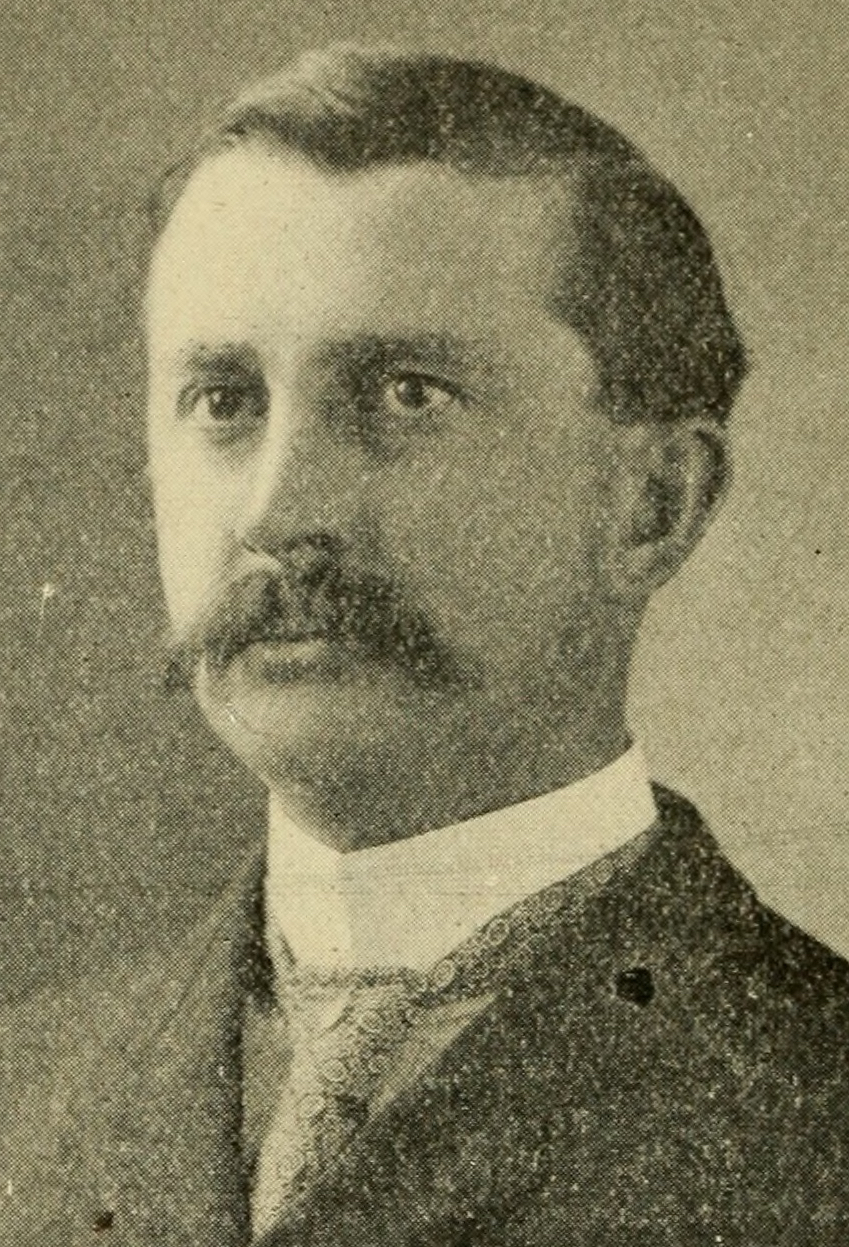
Alexis Boyer

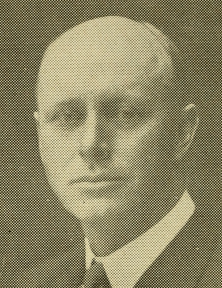
Herman Stanley Cheney

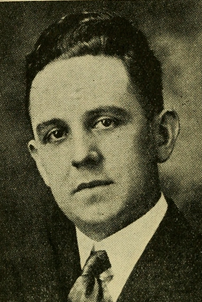
Valmore Tetreault

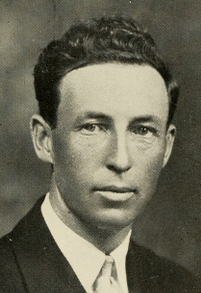
Ignatius Cleary

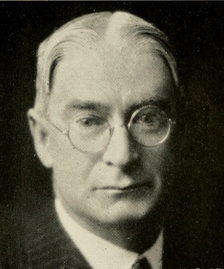
Joseph O'Kane

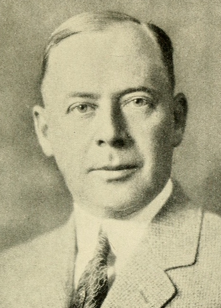
Edward Staves

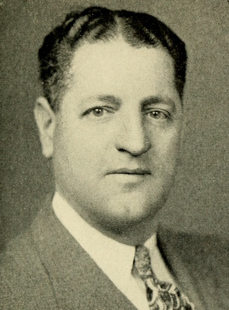
Leo Joseph Cournoyer

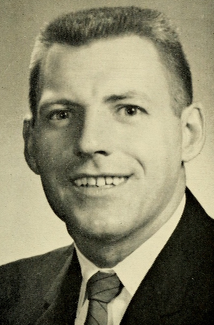
Paul Corriveau

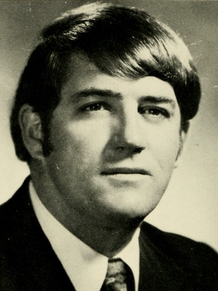
John Farland

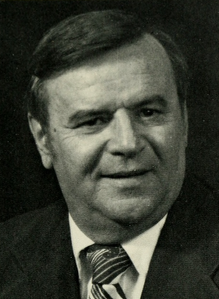
Henry Grenier

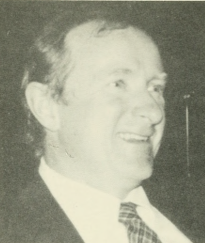
Stephen Brewer

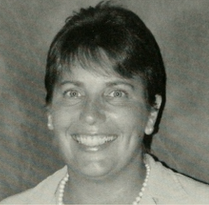
Anne Gobi
