= Massachusetts House of Representatives' 4th Worcester district =

American legislative district

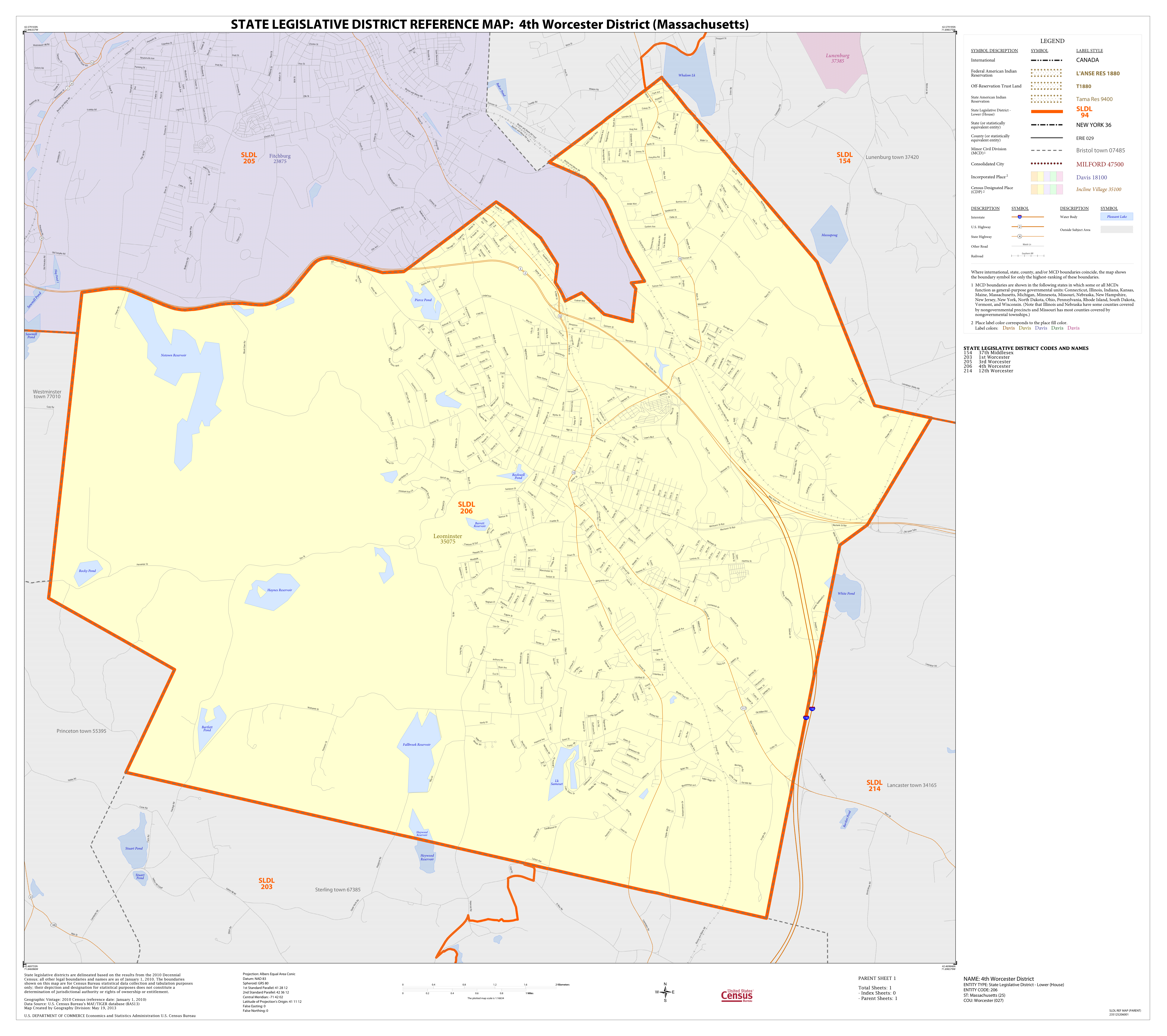
Map of Massachusetts House of Representatives' 4th Worcester district, based on the 2010 United States census.

Massachusetts House of Representatives' 4th Worcester district in the United States is one of 160 legislative districts included in the lower house of the Massachusetts General Court. It covers the city of Leominster in Worcester County. Democrat Natalie Higgins of Leominster has represented the district since 2017.

The current district geographic boundary overlaps with that of the Massachusetts Senate's Worcester and Middlesex district.

== Representatives ==
- Gerard Bushnell, circa 1858
- Aaron Greenwood, circa 1859
- Samuel Dwight Simonds, circa 1888
- Edgar J. Buck, circa 1920
- Philip Andrew Quinn, circa 1951
- Fredrick W. Schlosstein 1965-1973
- Henry R. Grenier, 1973-1976
- Angelo Picucci 1979-1989
- Robert A. Antonioni 1989-1993
- Mary Jane Simmons, 1993-2004
- Jennifer L. Flanagan 2005-2009
- Dennis A. Rosa 2009-2017
- Natalie Higgins, 2017-current

== Former locales ==
The district previously covered:

- Barre, circa 1872
- Dana, circa 1872
- Hardwick, circa 1872
- Hubbardston, circa 1872
- New Braintree, circa 1872
- Petersham, circa 1872
- Phillipston, circa 1872

== See also ==
- List of Massachusetts House of Representatives elections
- Other Worcester County districts of the Massachusetts House of Representatives: 1st, 2nd, 3rd, 5th, 6th, 7th, 8th, 9th, 10th, 11th, 12th, 13th, 14th, 15th, 16th, 17th, 18th
- Worcester County districts of the Massachusett Senate: 1st, 2nd; Hampshire, Franklin and Worcester; Middlesex and Worcester; Worcester, Hampden, Hampshire and Middlesex; Worcester and Middlesex; Worcester and Norfolk
- List of Massachusetts General Courts
- List of former districts of the Massachusetts House of Representatives

== Images ==
Portraits of legislators

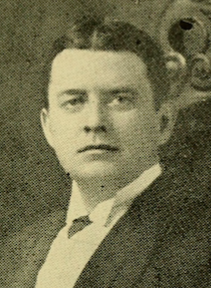
Herbert Maynard

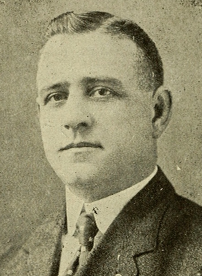
Warren Tarbell

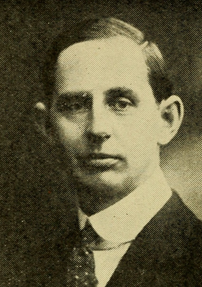
Herbert King Davidson

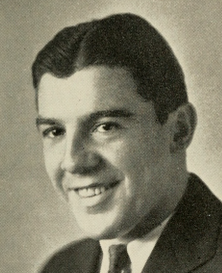
Albert Boyer

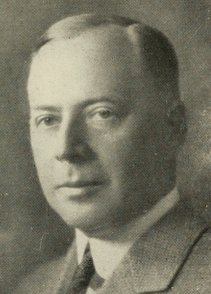
Edward Staves

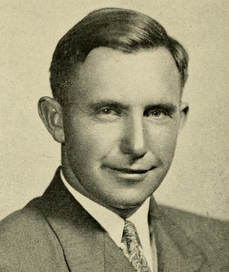
Charles Shepard

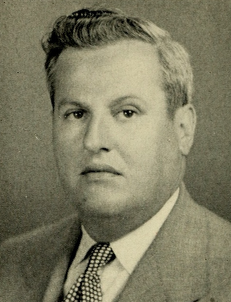
Philip Andrew Quinn

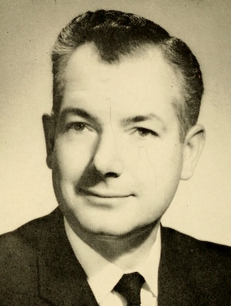
Frederic Schlosstein

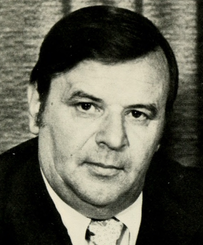
Henry Grenier

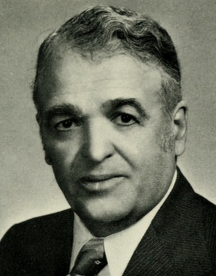
Angelo Picucci

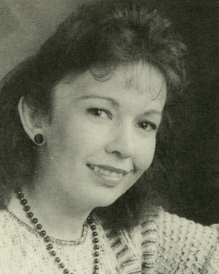
Mary Jane Simmons

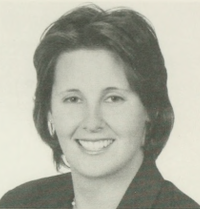
Jennifer Flanagan
