= Massachusetts Senate's 2nd Worcester district =

American legislative district

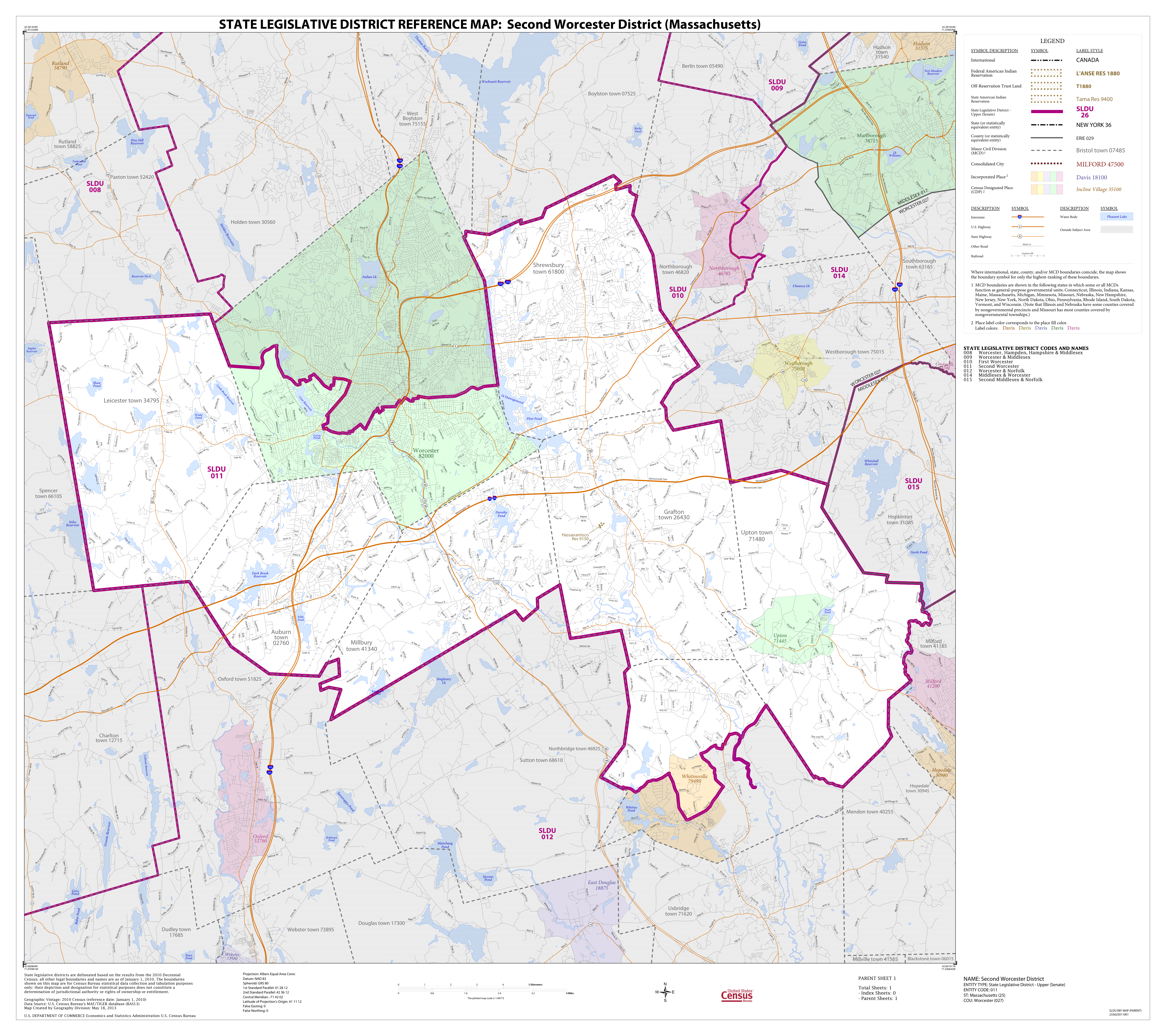
Map of Massachusetts Senate's 2nd Worcester district, based on the 2010 United States census.

Massachusetts Senate's 2nd Worcester district in the United States is one of 40 legislative districts of the Massachusetts Senate. It covers portions of Worcester county. Democrat Mike Moore of Millbury has represented the district since 2009.

== Locales represented ==
The district includes the following localities:

- Auburn
- Grafton
- Leicester
- Millbury
- part of Northbridge
- Shrewsbury
- Upton
- part of Worcester

=== Former locales ===
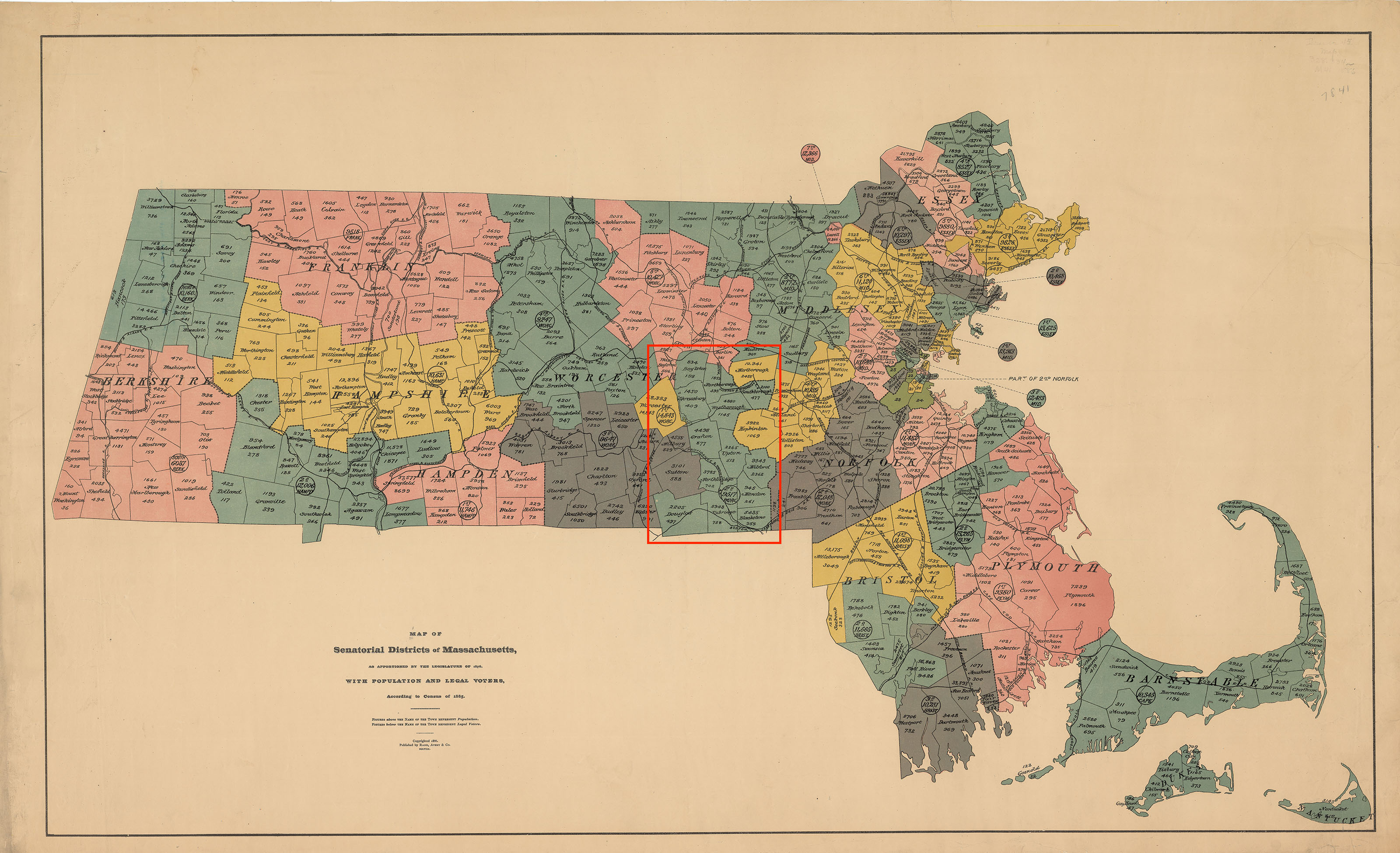
Map of the 1876 apportionment of the 2nd Worcester senatorial district

The district previously covered the following:

- Blackstone, circa 1860s
- Douglas, circa 1860s
- Mendon, circa 1860s
- Milford, circa 1860s
- Northborough, circa 1860s
- Southborough, circa 1860s
- Uxbridge, circa 1860s
- Westborough, circa 1860s

== Senators ==
- Edward Cowee
- Clarence Hobbs
- Albert Taylor Rhodes
- Edgar C. Erickson, circa 1935
- Stephen F. Loughlin, circa 1945
- Harold R. Lundgren, circa 1957
- John Joseph Conte, circa 1969
- Robert A. Hall, circa 1975
- Guy Glodis, circa 2002
- Edward M. Augustus, Jr., 2005-2008
- Michael O. Moore, 2009-current

== Images ==
Portraits of legislators

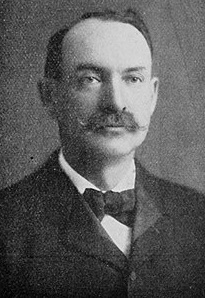
Edward Cowee

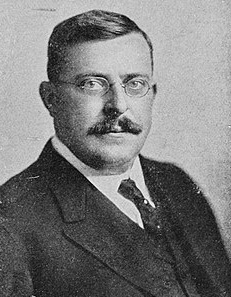
Clarence Hobbs

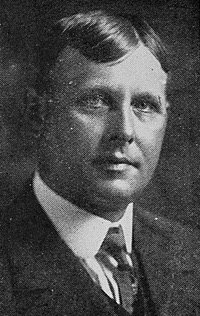
Albert Taylor Rhodes

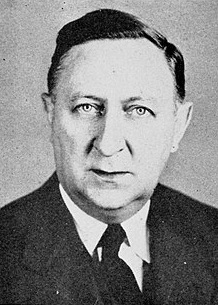
Stephen Loughlin

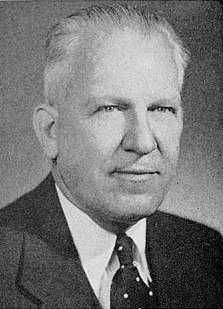
Harold Lundgren

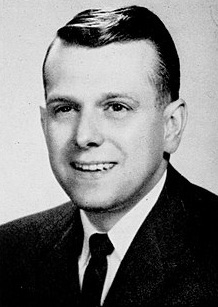
John Joseph Conte

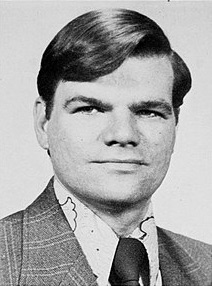
Robert A. Hall

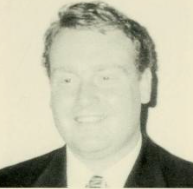
Guy Glodis

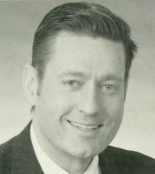
Edward M. Augustus, Jr.

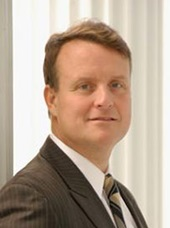
Michael O'Moore

== See also ==
- List of Massachusetts Senate elections
- List of Massachusetts General Courts
- List of former districts of the Massachusetts Senate
- Other Worcester County districts of the Massachusett Senate: 1st, Hampshire, Franklin and Worcester; Middlesex and Worcester; Worcester, Hampden, Hampshire and Middlesex; Worcester and Middlesex; Worcester and Norfolk
- Worcester County districts of the Massachusetts House of Representatives: 1st, 2nd, 3rd, 4th, 5th, 6th, 7th, 8th, 9th, 10th, 11th, 12th, 13th, 14th, 15th, 16th, 17th, 18th
