= Massachusetts's 17th Worcester House district =

American legislative district

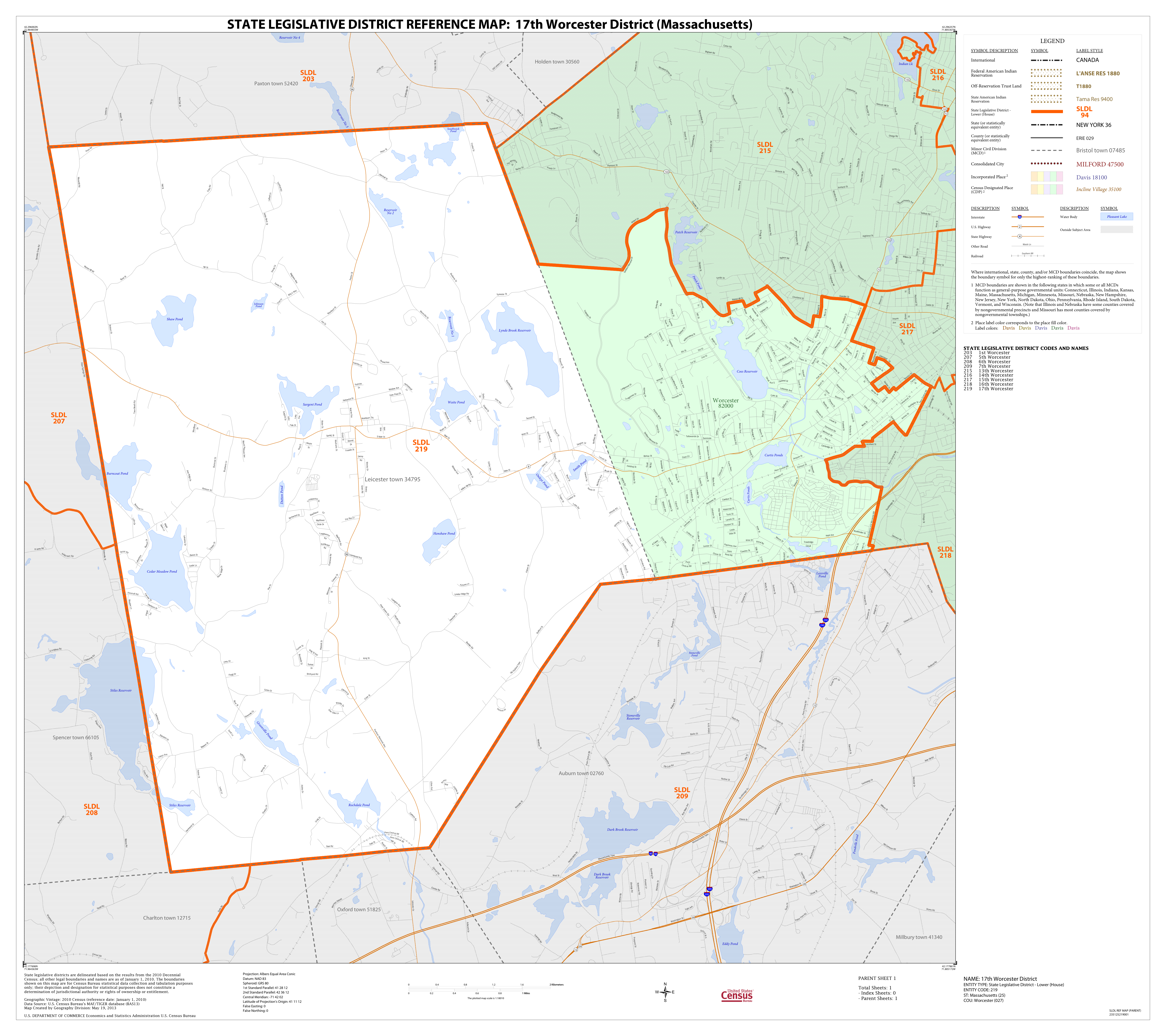
Map of Massachusetts House of Representatives' 17th Worcester district, based on the 2010 United States census.

The 17th Worcester district is one of 160 state legislative districts for the Massachusetts House of Representatives. It is located in Central Massachusetts.

Democrat David LeBoeuf of Worcester has represented the district since 2019. He is running for reelection in the 2020 Massachusetts general election.

== District profile ==
As of the last redistricting in 2011, the district encompasses all of the town of Leicester, including the villages of Cherry Valley and Rochdale, and the southwestern portion of the city of Worcester, including the neighborhoods of Main South and Webster Square. It has maintained these boundaries since 1995.

Leicester is a small town and developing suburb. It contains the Leicester campus of Becker College and is over 90 percent non-Hispanic white The Worcester portion of the district is an urban section of New England's second largest city. It contains Clark University and has significant Latino, Asian, and Black communities.

- Leicester
- Worcester's Ward 7; and Worcester's Ward 8: Precincts 2, 3, and 4

The current district geographic boundary overlaps with those of the Massachusetts Senate's 1st Worcester and 2nd Worcester districts.

=== Former locations ===
- c. 1872: Auburn, Charlton, Southbridge, and Spencer

== List of members representing the district ==
- Gilbert C. Taft, circa 1859
- Alfred S. Pinkerton, circa 1888
- Michael J. Fitzgerald, circa 1920

General Court	Representative	Party	Term	District location
145th	G. Adolph Johnson	Republican	January 5, 1927 – 1928	Worcester's Ward 6
146th	Victor Rolander	Republican	January 2, 1929 – October 10, 1935	Worcester's Ward 6
147th	Victor Rolander	Republican	January 2, 1929 – October 10, 1935	Worcester's Ward 6
148th	Victor Rolander	Republican	January 2, 1929 – October 10, 1935	Worcester's Ward 6
149th	Axel Sternlof	Republican	December 11, 1935 – 1937	Worcester's Ward 6
150th	Gustaf Carlson	Republican	January 6, 1937 – 1941	Worcester's Ward 6
151st	Gustaf Carlson	Republican	January 6, 1937 – 1941	Worcester's Ward 6
152nd	Sven Erickson	Republican	January 1, 1941 – 1947	Worcester's Ward 2
153rd	Sven Erickson	Republican	January 1, 1941 – 1947	Worcester's Ward 2
154th	Sven Erickson	Republican	January 1, 1941 – 1947	Worcester's Ward 2
155th	Stanley Johnson	Republican	January 1, 1947 – 1949	Worcester's Ward 2
156th	Joseph Aspero	Democratic	January 5, 1949 – 1953	Worcester's Ward 3
157th	Joseph Aspero	Democratic	January 5, 1949 – 1953	Worcester's Ward 3
158th	Domenic DePari	Democratic	January 7, 1953 – 1961	Worcester's Ward 3
159th	Domenic DePari	Democratic	January 7, 1953 – 1961	Worcester's Ward 3
160th	Domenic DePari	Democratic	January 7, 1953 – 1961	Worcester's Ward 3
161st	Domenic DePari	Democratic	January 7, 1953 – 1961	Worcester's Ward 3
162nd	Leo Turo	Democratic	January 4, 1961 – 1965	Worcester's Ward 3
163rd	Leo Turo	Democratic	January 4, 1961 – 1965	Worcester's Ward 3
164th	Robert Bohigian	Democratic	January 6, 1965 – January 1, 1975	Worcester's Ward 2 and Ward 3
165th	Robert Bohigian	Democratic	January 6, 1965 – January 1, 1975	Worcester's Ward 2 and Ward 3
166th	Robert Bohigian	Democratic	January 6, 1965 – January 1, 1975	Worcester's Ward 2 and Ward 3
167th	Robert Bohigian	Democratic	January 6, 1965 – January 1, 1975	Worcester's Ward 2 and Ward 3
168th	Robert Bohigian	Democratic	January 6, 1965 – January 1, 1975	Worcester's Ward 2 and Ward 3
169th	Robert Reynolds	Republican	January 1, 1975 – 1977	Berlin, Bolton, Boxborough, Harvard, Lancaster, and Northborough
170th	Walter Bickford	Democratic	January 5, 1977 – 1979	Berlin, Bolton, Boxborough, Harvard, Lancaster, and Northborough
171st	Robert McNeil	Democratic	January 3, 1979 – 1985	Leicester; Worcester's Ward 7; and Worcester's Ward 8: Precincts 1, 2, 4, 5, 6, and 7
172nd	Robert McNeil	Democratic	January 3, 1979 – 1985	Leicester; Worcester's Ward 7; and Worcester's Ward 8: Precincts 1, 2, 4, 5, 6, and 7
173rd	Robert McNeil	Democratic	January 3, 1979 – 1985	Leicester; Worcester's Ward 7; and Worcester's Ward 8: Precincts 1, 2, 4, 5, 6, and 7
174th	William Donovan	Democratic	January 2, 1985 – 1987	Leicester; Worcester's Ward 7; and Worcester's Ward 8: Precincts 1, 2, 4, 5, 6, and 7
175th	John Binienda	Democratic	January 7, 1987 – 1989	Leicester; Worcester's Ward 7; and Worcester's Ward 8: Precincts 1, 2, 4, 5, 6, and 7
176th	John Binienda	Democratic	January 4, 1989 – 1995	Leicester; Worcester's Ward 7; and Worcester's Ward 8: Precincts 2, 5, 6, 7, and 8
177th	John Binienda	Democratic	January 4, 1989 – 1995	Leicester; Worcester's Ward 7; and Worcester's Ward 8: Precincts 2, 5, 6, 7, and 8
178th	John Binienda	Democratic	January 4, 1989 – 1995	Leicester; Worcester's Ward 7; and Worcester's Ward 8: Precincts 2, 5, 6, 7, and 8
179th	John Binienda	Democratic	January 4, 1995 – August 22, 2014	Leicester; Worcester's Ward 7; and Worcester's Ward 8: Precincts 2, 3, and 4
180th	John Binienda	Democratic	January 4, 1995 – August 22, 2014	Leicester; Worcester's Ward 7; and Worcester's Ward 8: Precincts 2, 3, and 4
181st	John Binienda	Democratic	January 4, 1995 – August 22, 2014	Leicester; Worcester's Ward 7; and Worcester's Ward 8: Precincts 2, 3, and 4
182nd	John Binienda	Democratic	January 4, 1995 – August 22, 2014	Leicester; Worcester's Ward 7; and Worcester's Ward 8: Precincts 2, 3, and 4
183rd	John Binienda	Democratic	January 4, 1995 – August 22, 2014	Leicester; Worcester's Ward 7; and Worcester's Ward 8: Precincts 2, 3, and 4
184th	John Binienda	Democratic	January 4, 1995 – August 22, 2014	Leicester; Worcester's Ward 7; and Worcester's Ward 8: Precincts 2, 3, and 4
185th	John Binienda	Democratic	January 4, 1995 – August 22, 2014	Leicester; Worcester's Ward 7; and Worcester's Ward 8: Precincts 2, 3, and 4
186th	John Binienda	Democratic	January 4, 1995 – August 22, 2014	Leicester; Worcester's Ward 7; and Worcester's Ward 8: Precincts 2, 3, and 4
187th	John Binienda	Democratic	January 4, 1995 – August 22, 2014	Leicester; Worcester's Ward 7; and Worcester's Ward 8: Precincts 2, 3, and 4
188th	John Binienda	Democratic	January 4, 1995 – August 22, 2014	Leicester; Worcester's Ward 7; and Worcester's Ward 8: Precincts 2, 3, and 4
189th	Kate Campanale	Republican	January 7, 2015 – January 2, 2019	Leicester; Worcester's Ward 7; and Worcester's Ward 8: Precincts 2, 3, and 4
190th	Kate Campanale	Republican	January 7, 2015 – January 2, 2019	Leicester; Worcester's Ward 7; and Worcester's Ward 8: Precincts 2, 3, and 4
191st	David LeBoeuf	Democratic	January 9, 2019 – Present	Leicester; Worcester's Ward 7; and Worcester's Ward 8: Precincts 2, 3, and 4

== Electoral history ==
Election	Political result	Candidate	Party	Votes	%	±%
2018 general election Campanale did not seek re-election to run for Worcester Register of Deeds; Turnout: 11,487	Democratic gain from Republican; Majority: 2,146 (18.7%); Swing: 13.7% from Republican to D	David LeBoeuf	Democratic	6,808	59.3	+14
2018 general election Campanale did not seek re-election to run for Worcester Register of Deeds; Turnout: 11,487	Democratic gain from Republican; Majority: 2,146 (18.7%); Swing: 13.7% from Republican to D	Paul Fullen	Republican	4,662	40.6	−13.8
2016 general election Turnout: 14,713	Republican hold Majority: 1,340 (9.1%)	Kate Campanale	Republican	8,011	54.4	+4.2
2016 general election Turnout: 14,713	Republican hold Majority: 1,340 (9.1%)	Moses Dixon	Democratic	6,671	45.3	−4.4
2014 general election Binienda did not seek re-election and planned to retire (but died in August); Turnout: 9,344	Republican gain from Democratic; Majority: 43 (0.5%); Swing: 26.5% from D to Republican	Kate Campanale	Republican	4,688	50.2	+26.9
2014 general election Binienda did not seek re-election and planned to retire (but died in August); Turnout: 9,344	Republican gain from Democratic; Majority: 43 (0.5%); Swing: 26.5% from D to Republican	Doug Belanger	Democratic	4,645	49.7	−26.6
2012 general election Turnout: 13,878	Democratic hold Majority: 7,365 (53.1%)	John Binienda	Democratic	10,595	76.3	-21.3
2012 general election Turnout: 13,878	Democratic hold Majority: 7,365 (53.1%)	William LeBeau	Republican	3,230	23.3	+23.3
2010 general election Turnout: 8,082	Democratic hold Majority: 7,692 (95.2%)	John Binienda	Democratic	7,887	97.6	-0.9
2010 general election Turnout: 8,082	Democratic hold Majority: 7,692 (95.2%)	All others		195	2.4	
2008 general election Turnout: 11,813	Democratic hold Majority: 11,449 (96.9%)	John Binienda	Democratic	11,631	98.5	-0.9
2008 general election Turnout: 11,813	Democratic hold Majority: 11,449 (96.9%)	All others		182	1.5	
2006 general election Turnout: 8,309	Democratic hold Majority: 8,215 (98.9%)	John Binienda	Democratic	8,262	99.4	+0.5
2006 general election Turnout: 8,309	Democratic hold Majority: 8,215 (98.9%)	All others		47	0.6	

== Elections results from statewide races ==
Year	Office	District Results	Statewide Results
2012	President	Obama 63.2 – 34.1%	Obama 60.7 – 37.5%
2012	Senator	Warren 56.0 – 42.9%	Warren 53.7 – 46.2%
2013	Senator	Markey 50.1 – 49.0%	Markey 54.8 – 44.6%
2014	Governor	Baker 46.6 – 45.9%	Baker 48.4 – 46.5%
2014	Senator	Markey 58.9 – 35.7%	Markey 61.9 – 38.0%
2016	President	Clinton 57.4 – 33.7%	Clinton 60.0 – 32.8%
2018	Governor	Baker 64.2 – 33.4%	Baker 66.6 – 33.1%
2018	Senator	Warren 57.4 – 36.9%	Warren 60.3 – 36.2%

== See also ==
- Massachusetts General Court
- Massachusetts House of Representatives
- Other Worcester County districts of the Massachusetts House of Representatives: 1st, 2nd, 3rd, 4th, 5th, 6th, 7th, 8th, 9th, 10th, 11th, 12th, 13th, 14th, 15th, 16th, 18th
- Worcester County districts of the Massachusett Senate: 1st, 2nd; Hampshire, Franklin and Worcester; Middlesex and Worcester; Worcester, Hampden, Hampshire and Middlesex; Worcester and Middlesex; Worcester and Norfolk
- List of former districts of the Massachusetts House of Representatives

== Images ==
Portraits of legislators

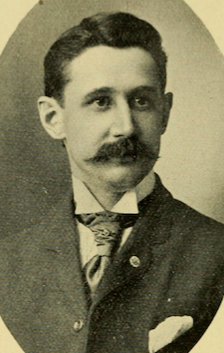
John H. Thompson

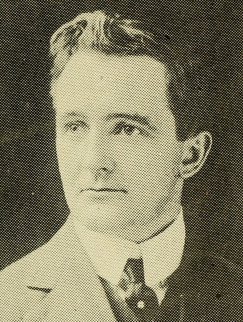
Francis McKeon

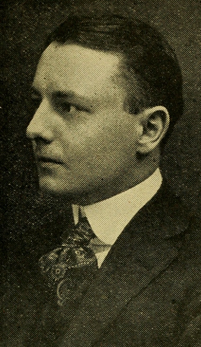
George Foley

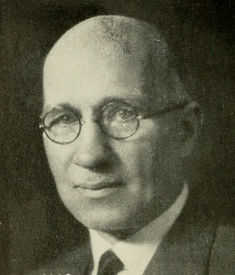
Victor Rolander

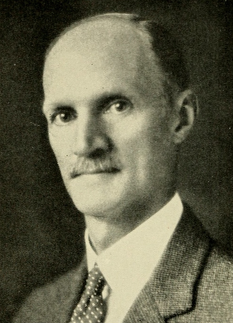
Sven Erickson

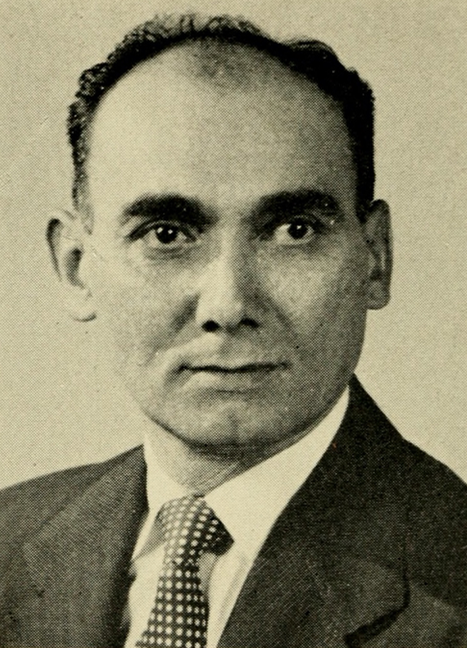
Domenic Victor DePari

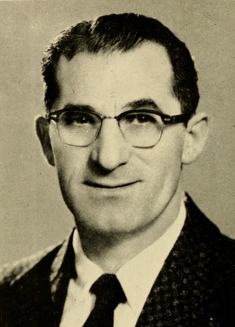
Andrew Collaro

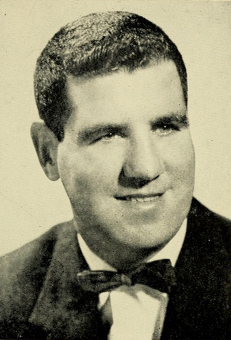
Robert Bohigian

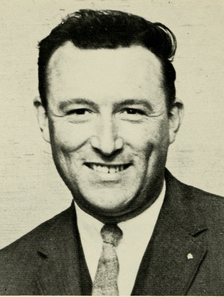
Robert Reynolds

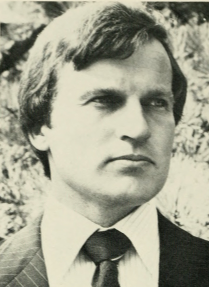
Walter Bickford

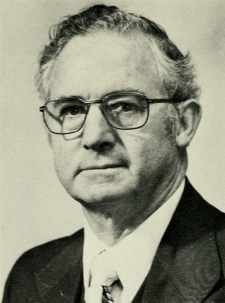
Robert McNeil

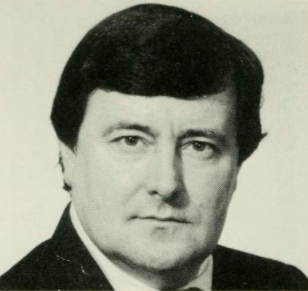
John Binienda
