= Massachusetts House of Representatives' 12th Worcester district =

American legislative district

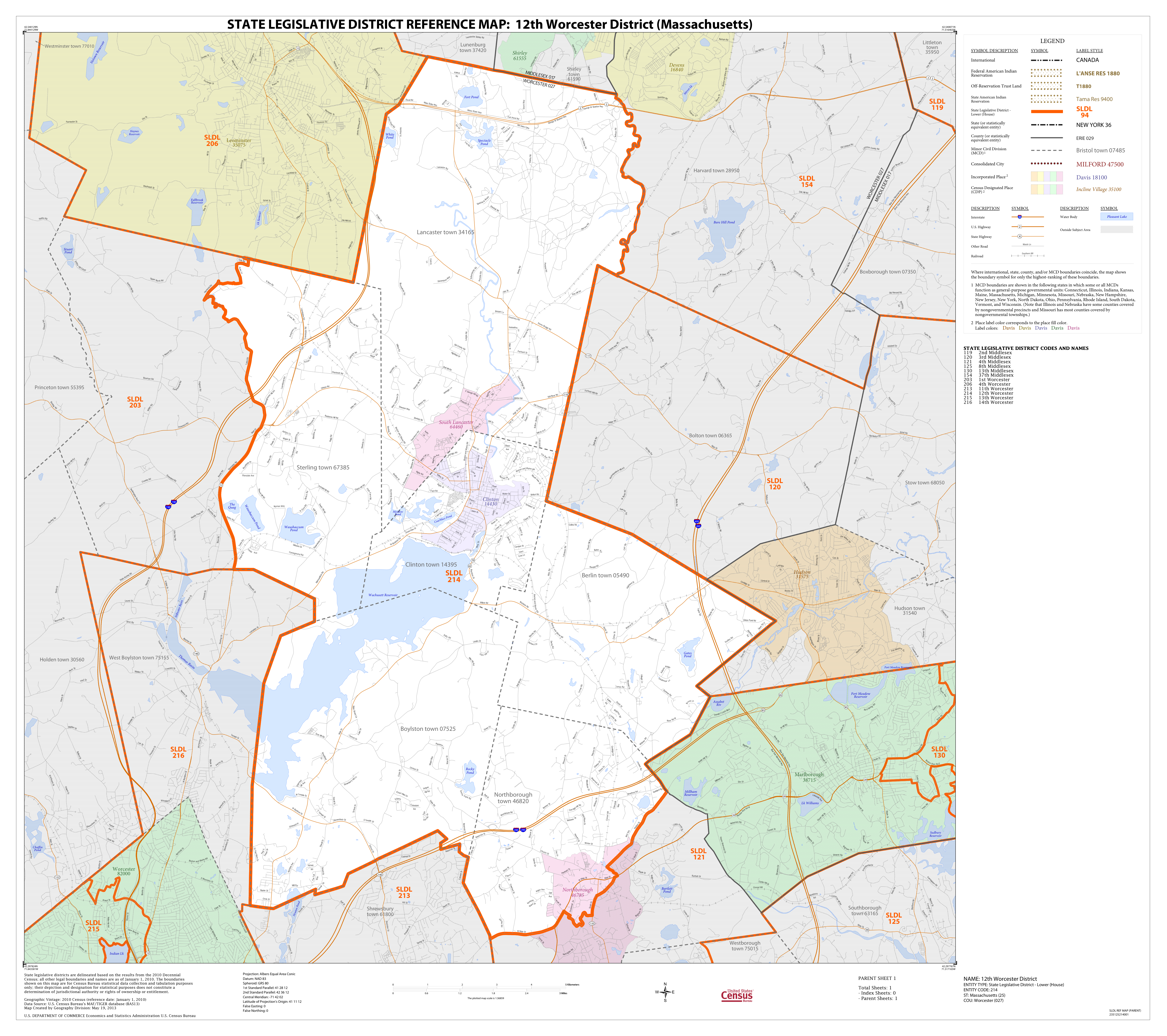
Map of Massachusetts House of Representatives' 12th Worcester district, based on the 2010 United States census.

Massachusetts House of Representatives' 12th Worcester district in the United States is one of 160 legislative districts included in the lower house of the Massachusetts General Court. It covers part of Worcester County. Democrat Meghan Kilcoyne has represented the district since 2021.

== Towns represented ==
The district includes the following localities:

- Berlin
- Boylston
- Clinton
- Lancaster
- part of Northborough
- Sterling

The current district geographic boundary overlaps with those of the Massachusetts Senate's 1st Worcester, Worcester and Middlesex, and Worcester and Hampshire districts.

=== Former locales ===
The district previously covered:

- Grafton, circa 1872
- Shrewsbury, circa 1872

== Representatives ==
- Amasa Walker, circa 1858
- Luther Stowell, circa 1859
- Albert L. Fisher, circa 1888
- J. Henry Robinson, circa 1888
- Henry H. Wheelock, circa 1920
- Arthur Ulton Mahan, circa 1951
- Thomas Francis Fallon, circa 1975
- William Constantino Jr.
- Harold P. Naughton, Jr., 1995-2021
- Meghan Kilcoyne, 2021-current

== See also ==
- List of Massachusetts House of Representatives elections
- Other Worcester County districts of the Massachusetts House of Representatives: 1st, 2nd, 3rd, 4th, 5th, 6th, 7th, 8th, 9th, 10th, 11th, 13th, 14th, 15th, 16th, 17th, 18th
- Worcester County districts of the Massachusett Senate: 1st, 2nd; Hampshire, Franklin and Worcester; Middlesex and Worcester; Worcester, Hampden, Hampshire and Middlesex; Worcester and Middlesex; Worcester and Norfolk
- List of Massachusetts General Courts
- List of former districts of the Massachusetts House of Representatives

== Images ==
Portraits of legislators

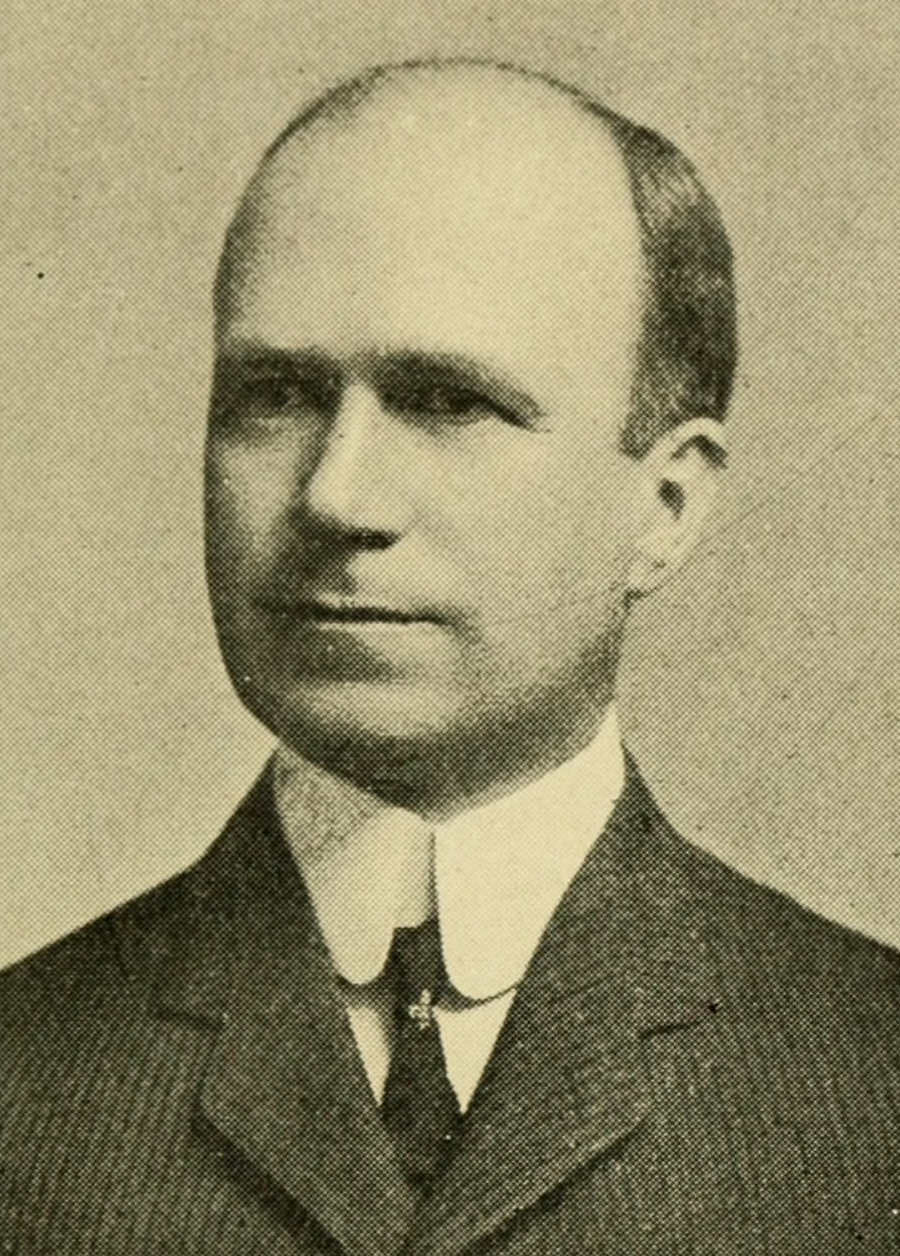
Benjamin Cook

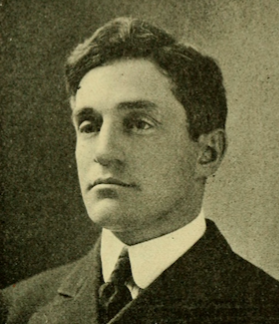
M. Fred O'Connell

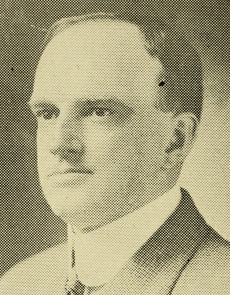
Frederic Nichols

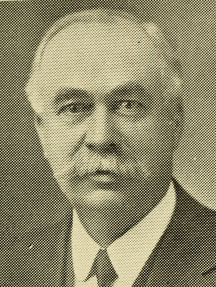
Henry Cowdrey

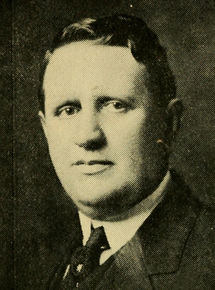
Henry Wheelock

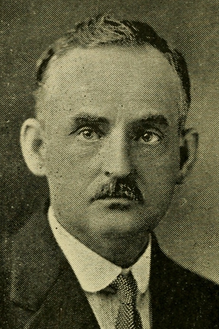
Louis Deschenes

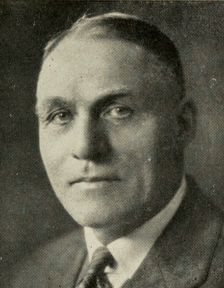
Martin Swanson

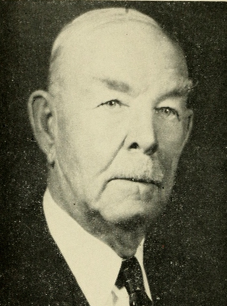
Adin Custance

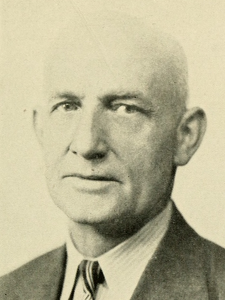
E. Guy Sawyer

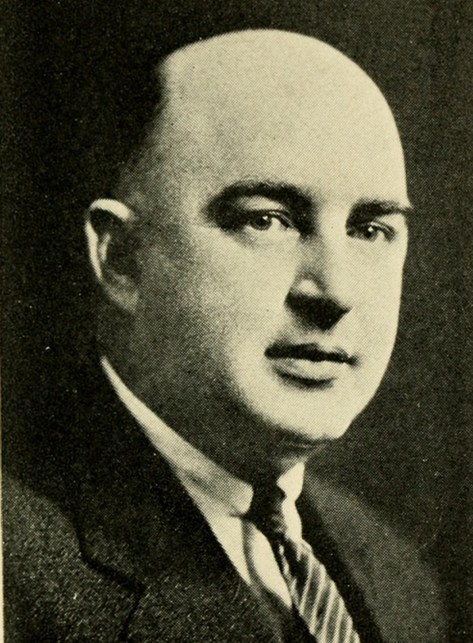
Arthur Ulton Mahan

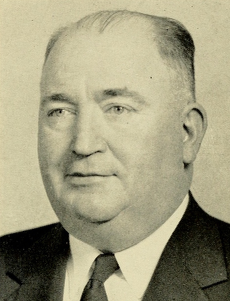
J. Robert Mahan

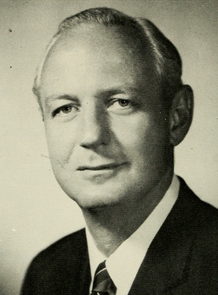
Thomas Fallon

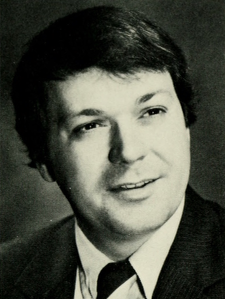
William Constantino

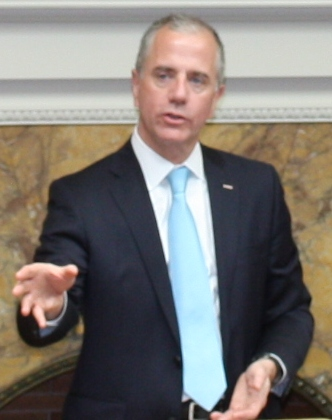
Harold Naughton
