= Massachusetts House of Representatives' 6th Worcester district =

American legislative district

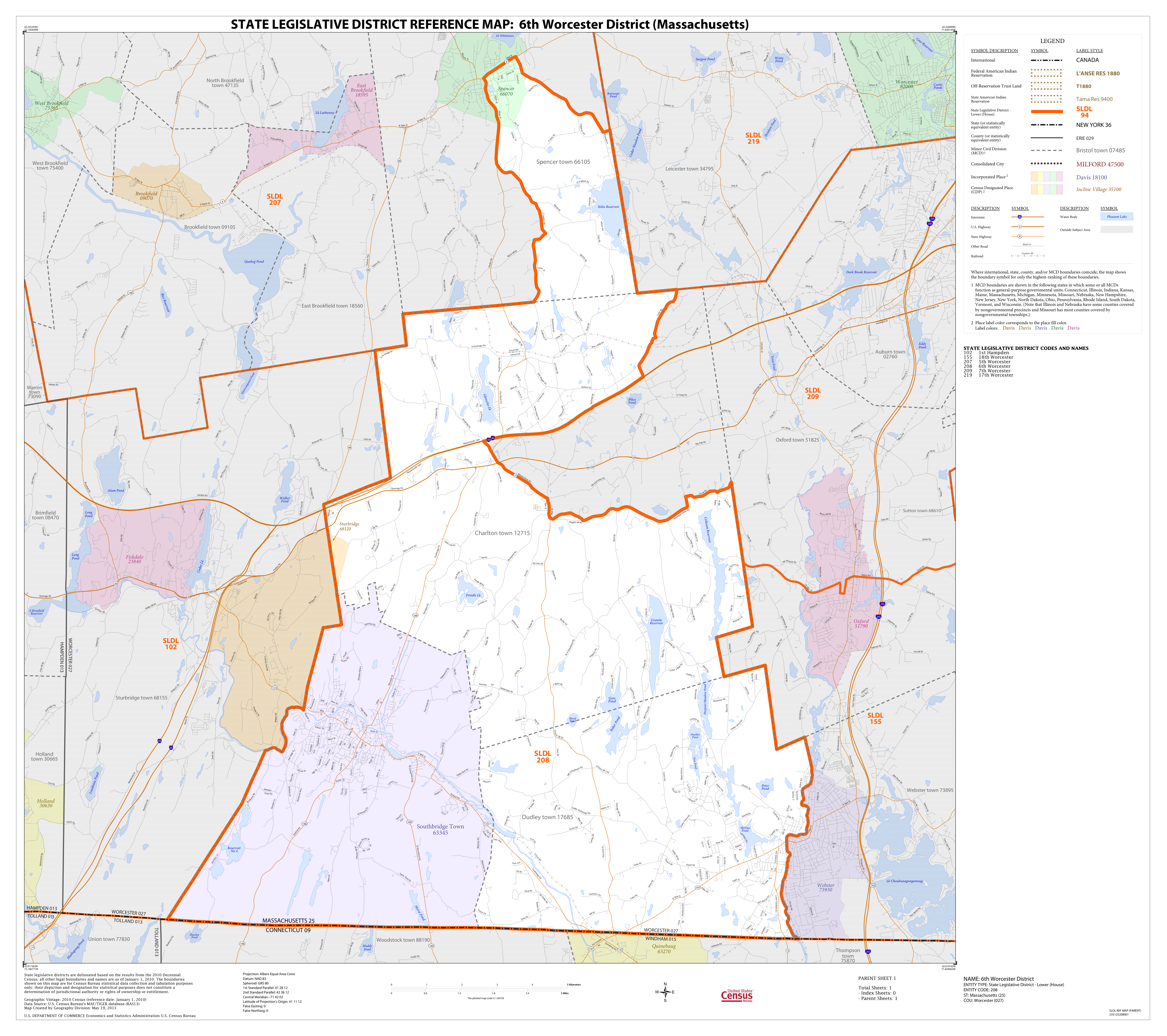
Map of Massachusetts House of Representatives' 6th Worcester district, based on the 2010 United States census.

Massachusetts House of Representatives' 6th Worcester district in the United States is one of 160 legislative districts included in the lower house of the Massachusetts General Court. It covers part of Worcester County. Republican State Representative John Marsi has represented the district since March 2024.

== Towns represented ==
The district includes the following localities:

- part of Charlton
- Dudley
- Southbridge
- part of Spencer

The current district geographic boundary overlaps with those of the Massachusetts Senate's Worcester and Norfolk district and Worcester, Hampden, Hampshire and Middlesex district.

=== Former locales ===
The district previously covered:

- Bolton, circa 1872
- Harvard, circa 1872
- Lancaster, circa 1872

== Representatives ==
- James Bennett, circa 1858
- Amasa Norcross, circa 1858-1859
- Samuel Osgood, circa 1858
- Charles L. Josselyn, circa 1859
- Edwin Upton, circa 1859
- Luther Hill, circa 1888
- Louis Adelard Breault, circa 1920
- Charles J. Skladzien, circa 1951
- William A. Starzec, circa 1975
- Marilyn Travinski, 1983–1991
- David M. Peters
- Mark J. Carron
- Geraldo Alicea
- Peter Durant, 2011–2023
- John Marsi, 2024–present

== See also ==
- List of Massachusetts House of Representatives elections
- Other Worcester County districts of the Massachusetts House of Representatives: 1st, 2nd, 3rd, 4th, 5th, 7th, 8th, 9th, 10th, 11th, 12th, 13th, 14th, 15th, 16th, 17th, 18th
- Worcester County districts of the Massachusett Senate: 1st, 2nd; Hampshire, Franklin and Worcester; Middlesex and Worcester; Worcester, Hampden, Hampshire and Middlesex; Worcester and Middlesex; Worcester and Norfolk
- List of Massachusetts General Courts
- List of former districts of the Massachusetts House of Representatives

== Images ==
Portraits of legislators

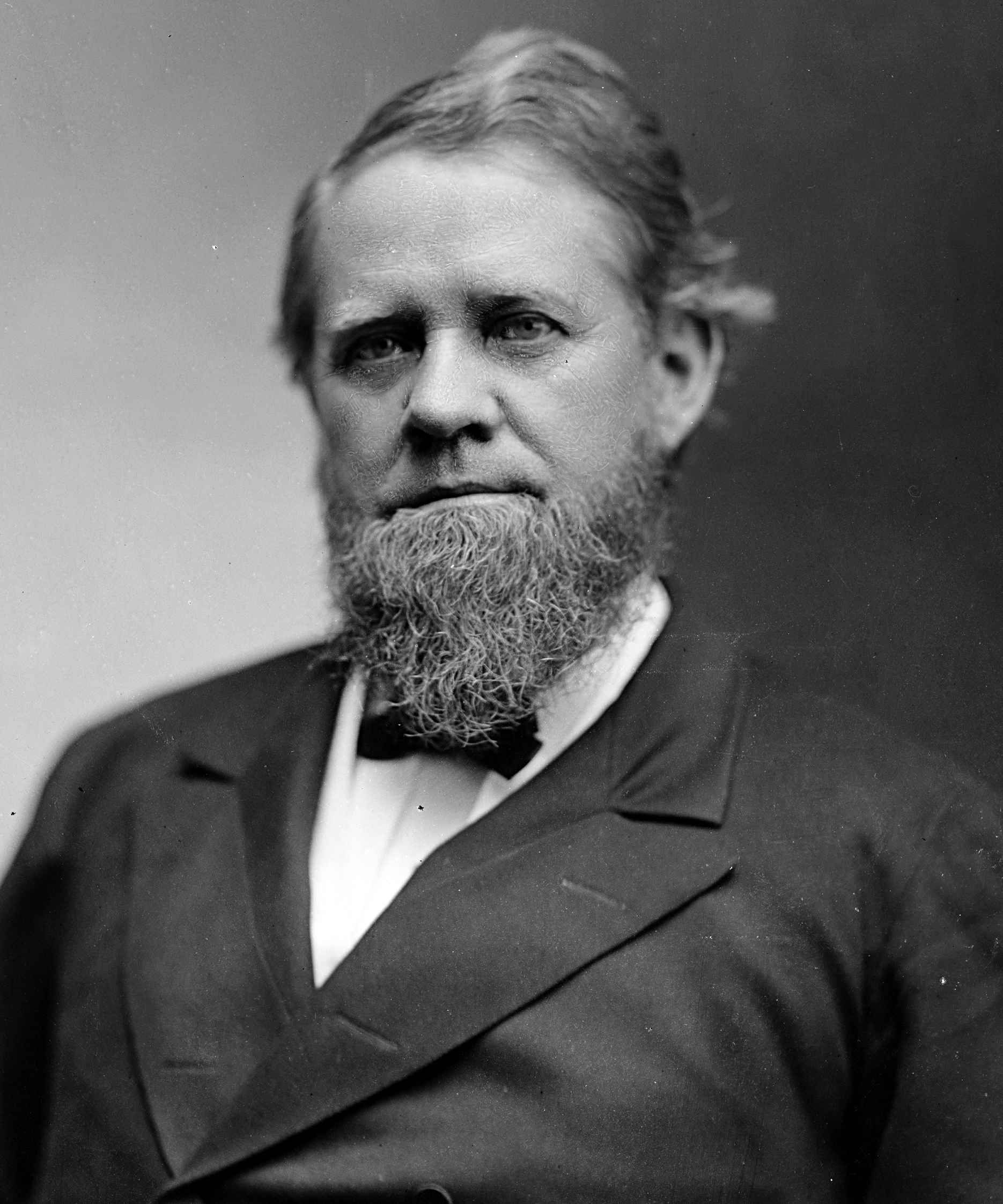
Amasa Norcross

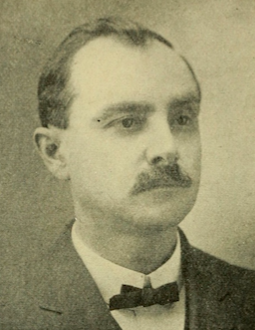
Frank Collette

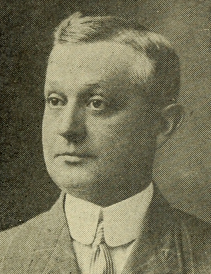
George Brunell

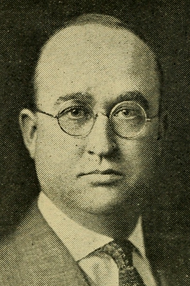
Francis Cassidy

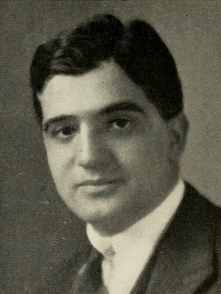
George Kurzon

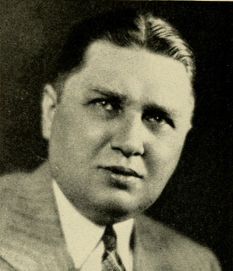
Charles Skladzien

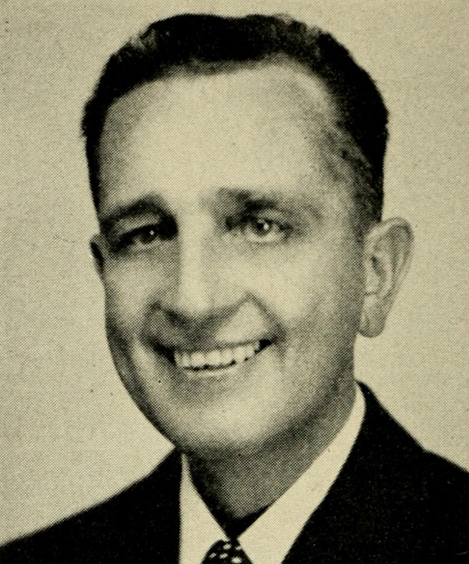
John Peter Ivascyn

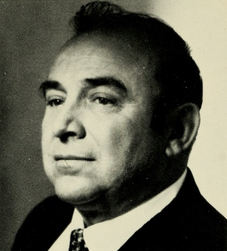
William Starzec

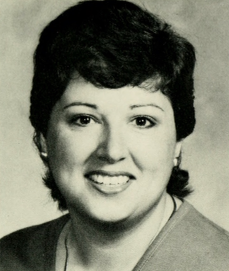
Marilyn Travinski

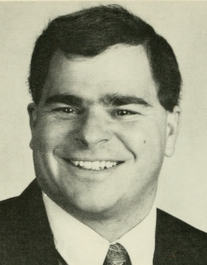
David Peters

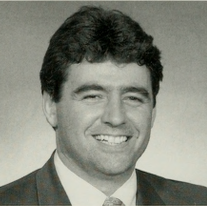
Mark Carron
