= Massachusetts House of Representatives' 8th Worcester district =

American legislative district

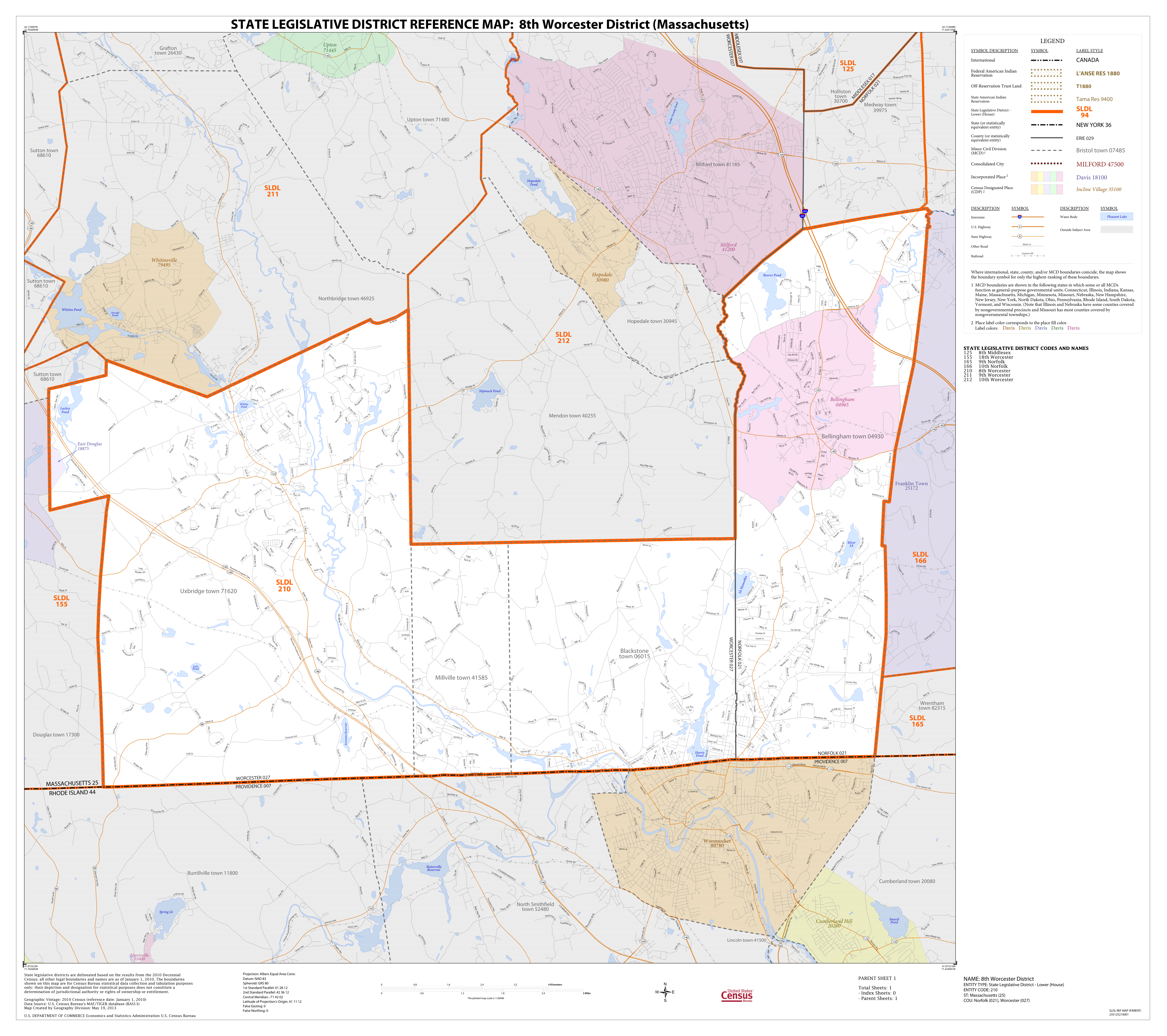
Map of Massachusetts House of Representatives' 8th Worcester district, based on the 2010 United States census.

Massachusetts House of Representatives' 8th Worcester district in the United States is one of 160 legislative districts included in the lower house of the Massachusetts General Court. It covers parts of Norfolk County and Worcester County. Republican Mike Soter of Bellingham has represented the district since 2019.

== Towns represented ==
The district includes the following localities:

- Bellingham
- Blackstone
- Millville
- Uxbridge

The current district geographic boundary overlaps with that of the Massachusetts Senate's Worcester and Norfolk district.

=== Former locales ===
The district previously covered:

- Boylston, circa 1872
- Sterling, circa 1872
- West Boylston, circa 1872

== Representatives ==
- Horace Faulkner, circa 1858
- John M. Washburn, circa 1859
- John J. Allen, circa 1888
- Samuel V. Crane, circa 1920
- Peter F. Fitzgerald, circa 1951
- Charles A. Mullaly, Jr., circa 1951
- Richard James Dwinell, circa 1975
- Kevin Kuros, 2011–2018
- Michael J. Soter, 2019-current

== See also ==
- List of Massachusetts House of Representatives elections
- Other Worcester County districts of the Massachusetts House of Representatives: 1st, 2nd, 3rd, 4th, 5th, 6th, 7th, 9th, 10th, 11th, 12th, 13th, 14th, 15th, 16th, 17th, 18th
- Worcester County districts of the Massachusett Senate: 1st, 2nd; Hampshire, Franklin and Worcester; Middlesex and Worcester; Worcester, Hampden, Hampshire and Middlesex; Worcester and Middlesex; Worcester and Norfolk
- List of Massachusetts General Courts
- List of former districts of the Massachusetts House of Representatives

== Images ==
Portraits of legislators

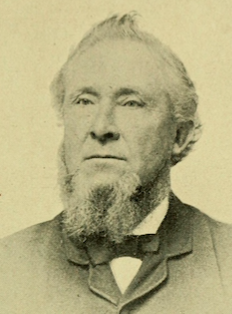
Aaron Jones

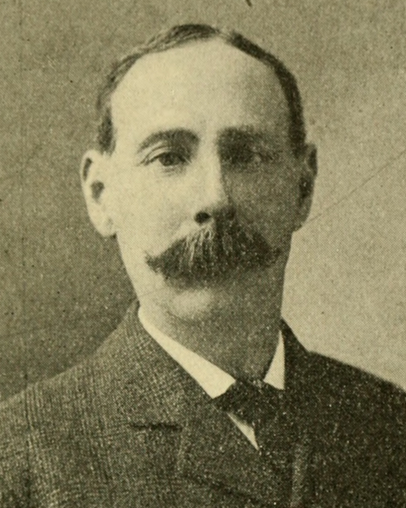
Samuel Crane

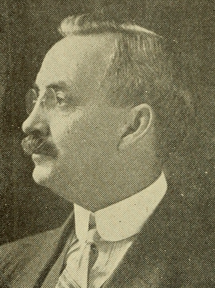
James Ferry

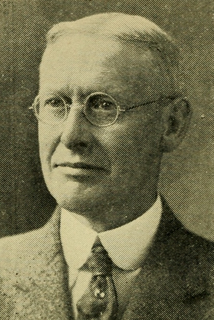
Herbert George

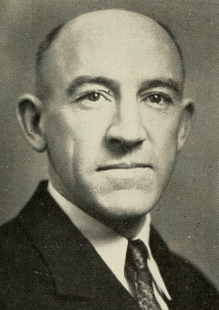
Christopher Tyrrell

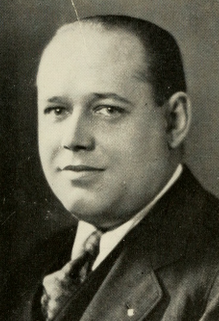
Elmer Nelson

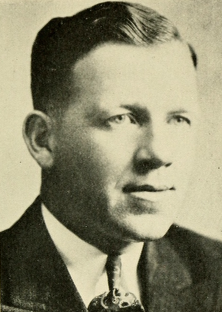
Michael Conway

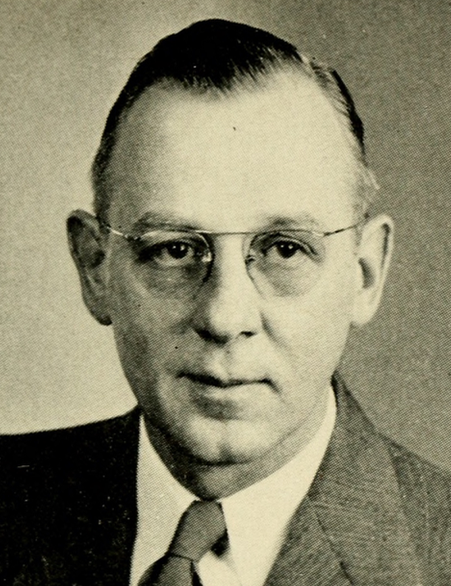
Charles Luke Driscoll

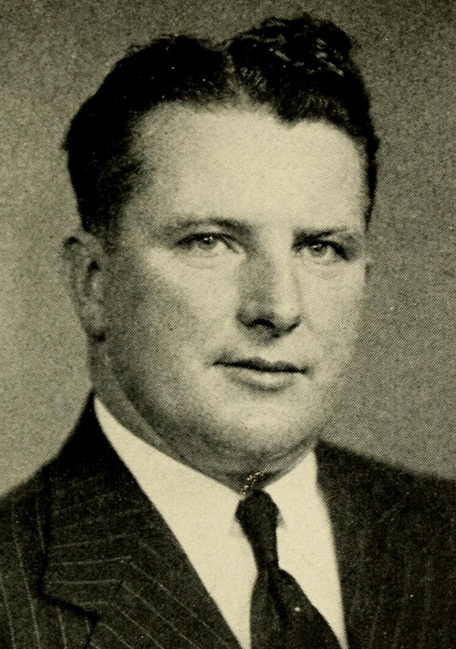
Charles Mullaly

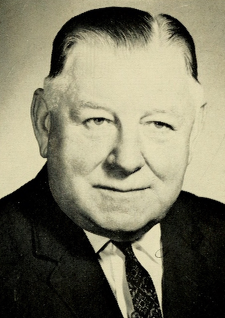
F. Leo Kenney

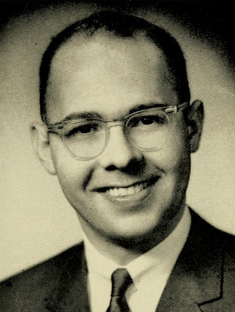
Harold Gould

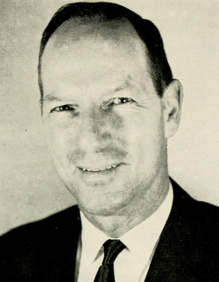
Richard Dwinell

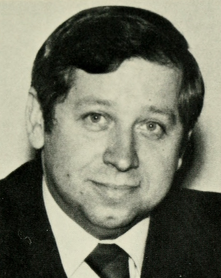
Richard Moore

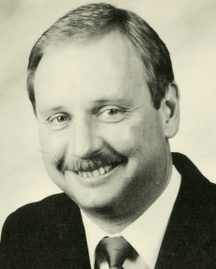
Paul Kujawski

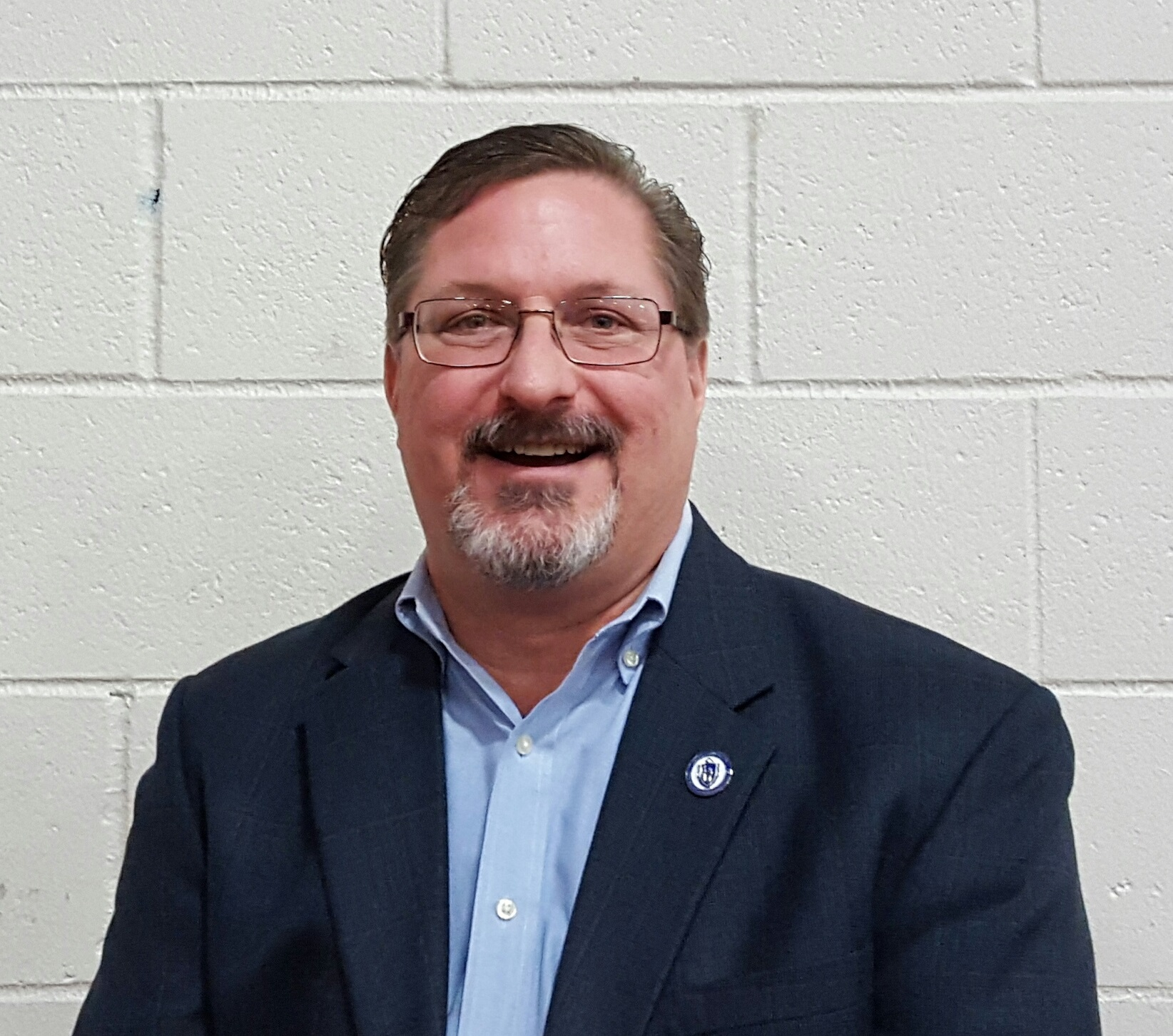
Kevin Kuros
