= Massachusetts House of Representatives' 7th Worcester district =

American legislative district

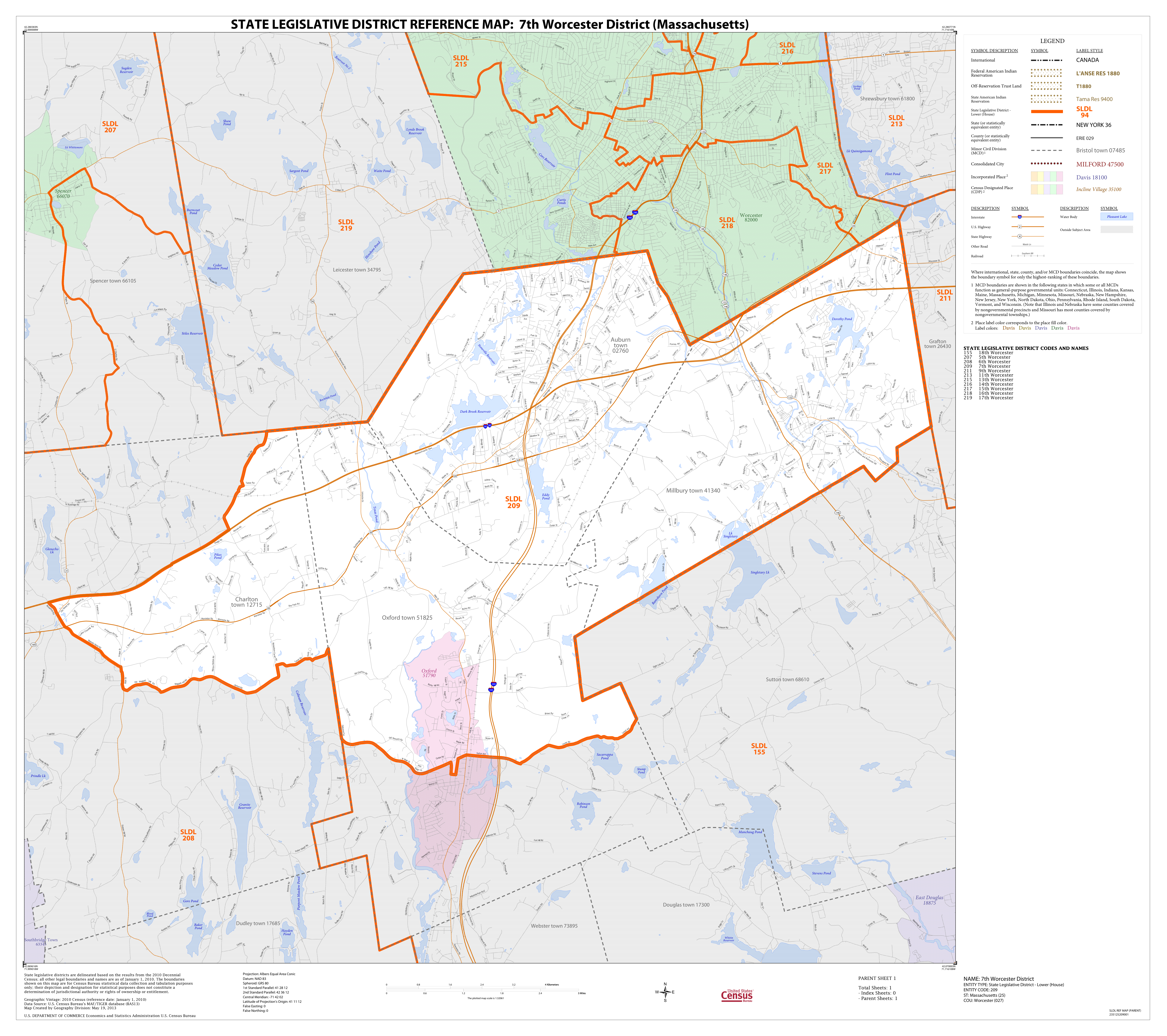
Map of Massachusetts House of Representatives' 7th Worcester district, based on the 2010 United States census.

Massachusetts House of Representatives' 7th Worcester district in the United States is one of 160 legislative districts included in the lower house of the Massachusetts General Court. It covers part of Worcester County. Republican Paul Frost of Auburn has represented the district since 1997.

== Towns represented ==
The district includes the following localities:

- Auburn
- part of Charlton
- Millbury
- part of Oxford

The current district geographic boundary overlaps with those of the Massachusetts Senate's 2nd Worcester district, Worcester and Norfolk district, and Worcester, Hampden, Hampshire and Middlesex district.

=== Former locales ===
The district previously covered:

- Berlin, circa 1872
- Clinton, circa 1872
- Northboro, circa 1872

== Representatives ==
- John E. Fry, circa 1858
- George E. Burt, circa 1859
- Charles Haggerty, circa 1888
- John F. Freeland, circa 1920
- Frank Haskell Allen, circa 1951
- Robert D. McNeil, circa 1975
- Paul K. Frost, 1997-current

== See also ==
- List of Massachusetts House of Representatives elections
- Other Worcester County districts of the Massachusetts House of Representatives: 1st, 2nd, 3rd, 4th, 5th, 6th, 8th, 9th, 10th, 11th, 12th, 13th, 14th, 15th, 16th, 17th, 18th
- Worcester County districts of the Massachusett Senate: 1st, 2nd; Hampshire, Franklin and Worcester; Middlesex and Worcester; Worcester, Hampden, Hampshire and Middlesex; Worcester and Middlesex; Worcester and Norfolk
- List of Massachusetts General Courts
- List of former districts of the Massachusetts House of Representatives

== Images ==
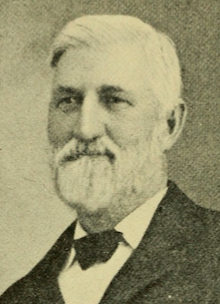
Louis Pattison

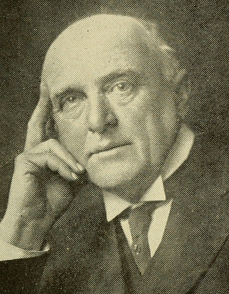
William Johnson

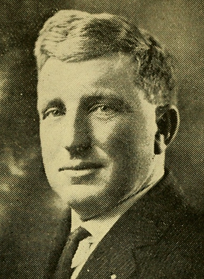
Howard King

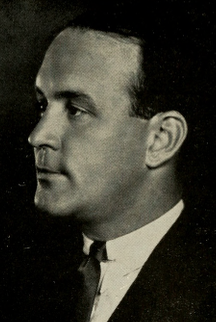
John Lasell

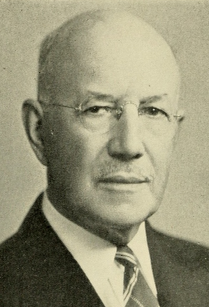
Louis Elliot

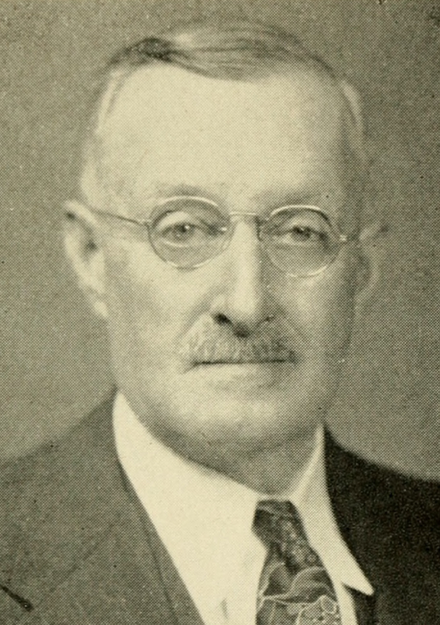
Frank Haskell Allen

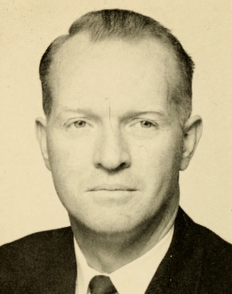
Albert Nash

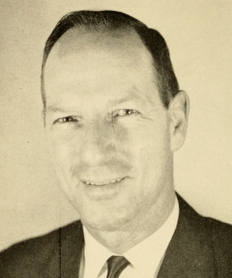
Richard Dwinell

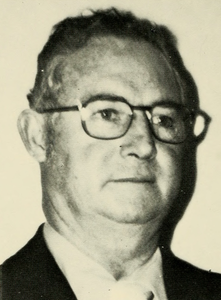
Robert McNeil

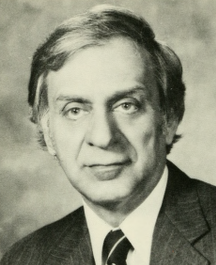
Paul Kollios
