= Massachusetts House of Representatives' 15th Worcester district =

American legislative district

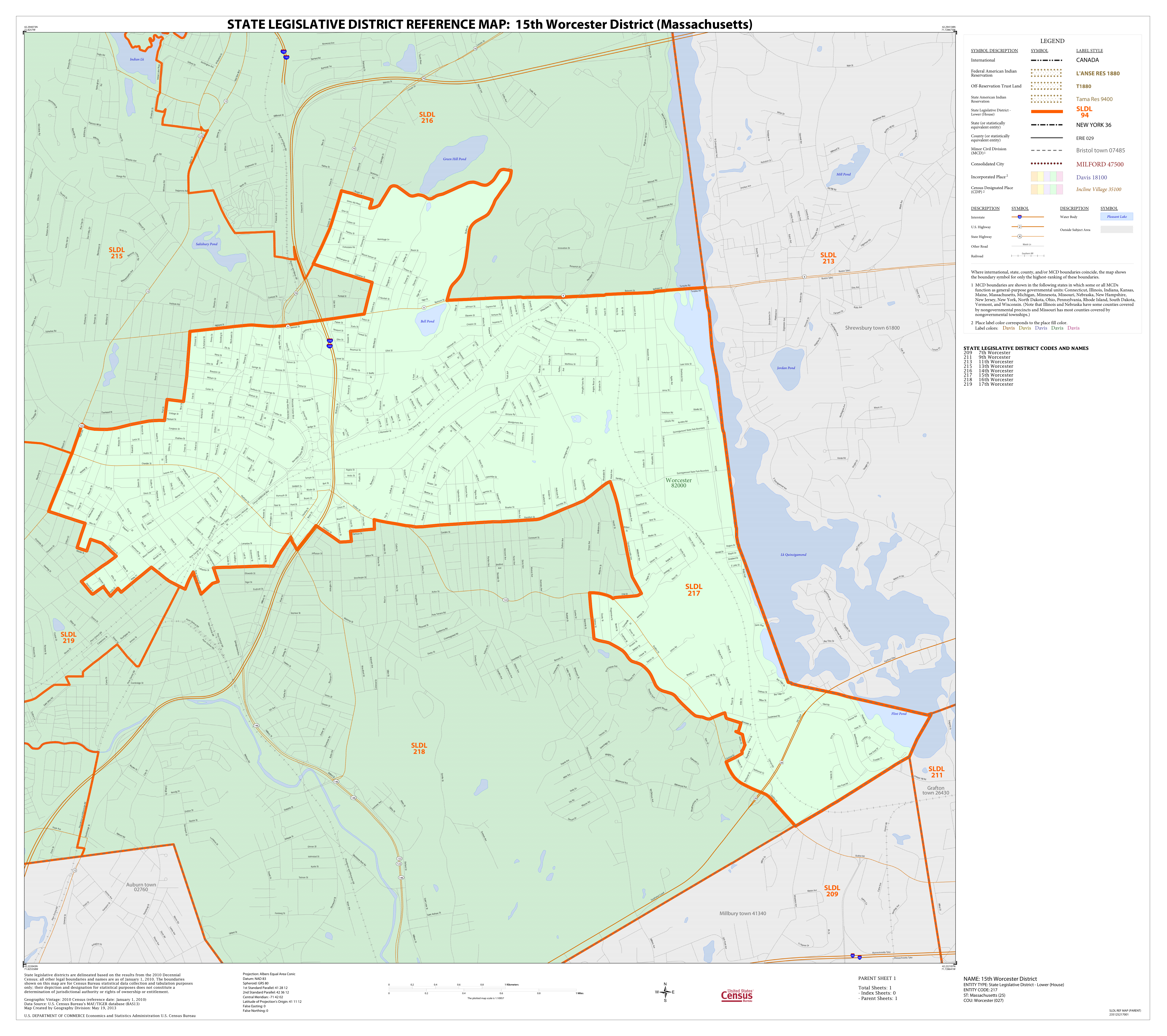
Map of Massachusetts House of Representatives' 15th Worcester district, based on the 2010 United States census.

Massachusetts House of Representatives' 15th Worcester district in the United States is one of 160 legislative districts included in the lower house of the Massachusetts General Court. It covers part of the city of Worcester in Worcester County. Democrat Mary Keefe of Worcester has represented the district since 2013.

The current district geographic boundary overlaps with those of the Massachusetts Senate's 1st Worcester and 2nd Worcester districts.

== Representatives ==
- Milo Hildreth, circa 1858
- Nathan W. Williams, circa 1859
- Horace M. Kendall, circa 1888
- John W. Kimball, circa 1888
- Daniel J. Marshall, circa 1920
- Ernest A. Johnson, circa 1951
- George J. Bourque, circa 1975
- Mary S. Keefe, 2013-current

== Former locales ==
The district previously covered:

- Blackstone, circa 1872
- Mendon, circa 1872
- Milford, circa 1872
- Uxbridge, circa 1872

== See also ==
- List of Massachusetts House of Representatives elections
- Other Worcester County districts of the Massachusetts House of Representatives: 1st, 2nd, 3rd, 4th, 5th, 6th, 7th, 8th, 9th, 10th, 11th, 12th, 13th, 14th, 16th, 17th, 18th
- Worcester County districts of the Massachusett Senate: 1st, 2nd; Hampshire, Franklin and Worcester; Middlesex and Worcester; Worcester, Hampden, Hampshire and Middlesex; Worcester and Middlesex; Worcester and Norfolk
- List of Massachusetts General Courts
- List of former districts of the Massachusetts House of Representatives

== Images ==
Portraits of legislators

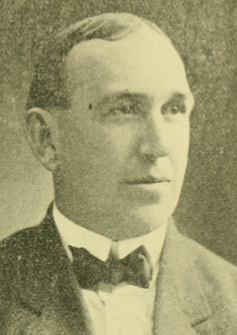
Cornelius Carmody

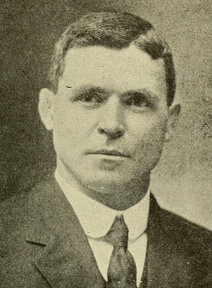
Michael Malone

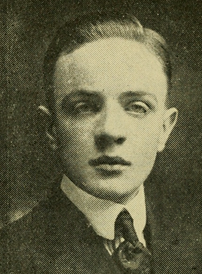
Edward Kelley

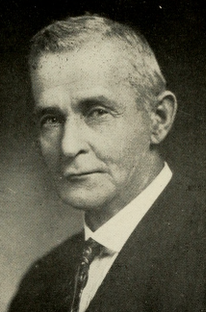
Charles Kelley

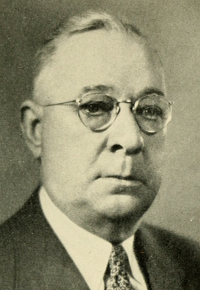
Thomas Matthews

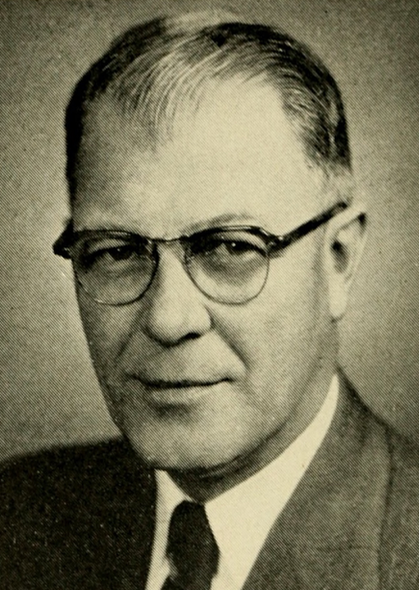
Ernest Johnson

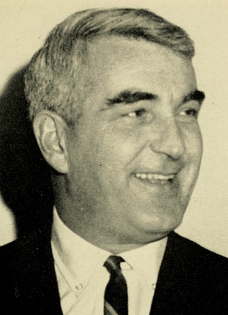
Raymond LaFontaine

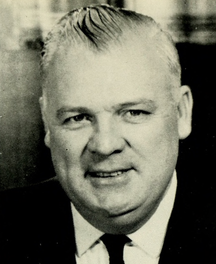
George Bourque

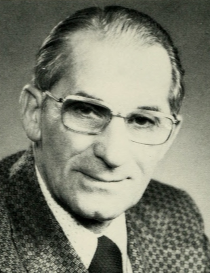
Andrew Collaro

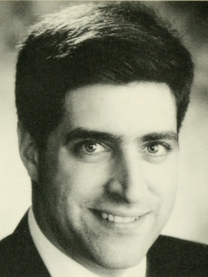
Vincent Pedone

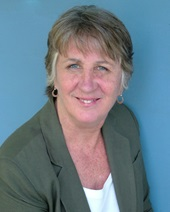
Mary Keefe
