= Massachusetts Senate's 1st Worcester district =

American legislative district

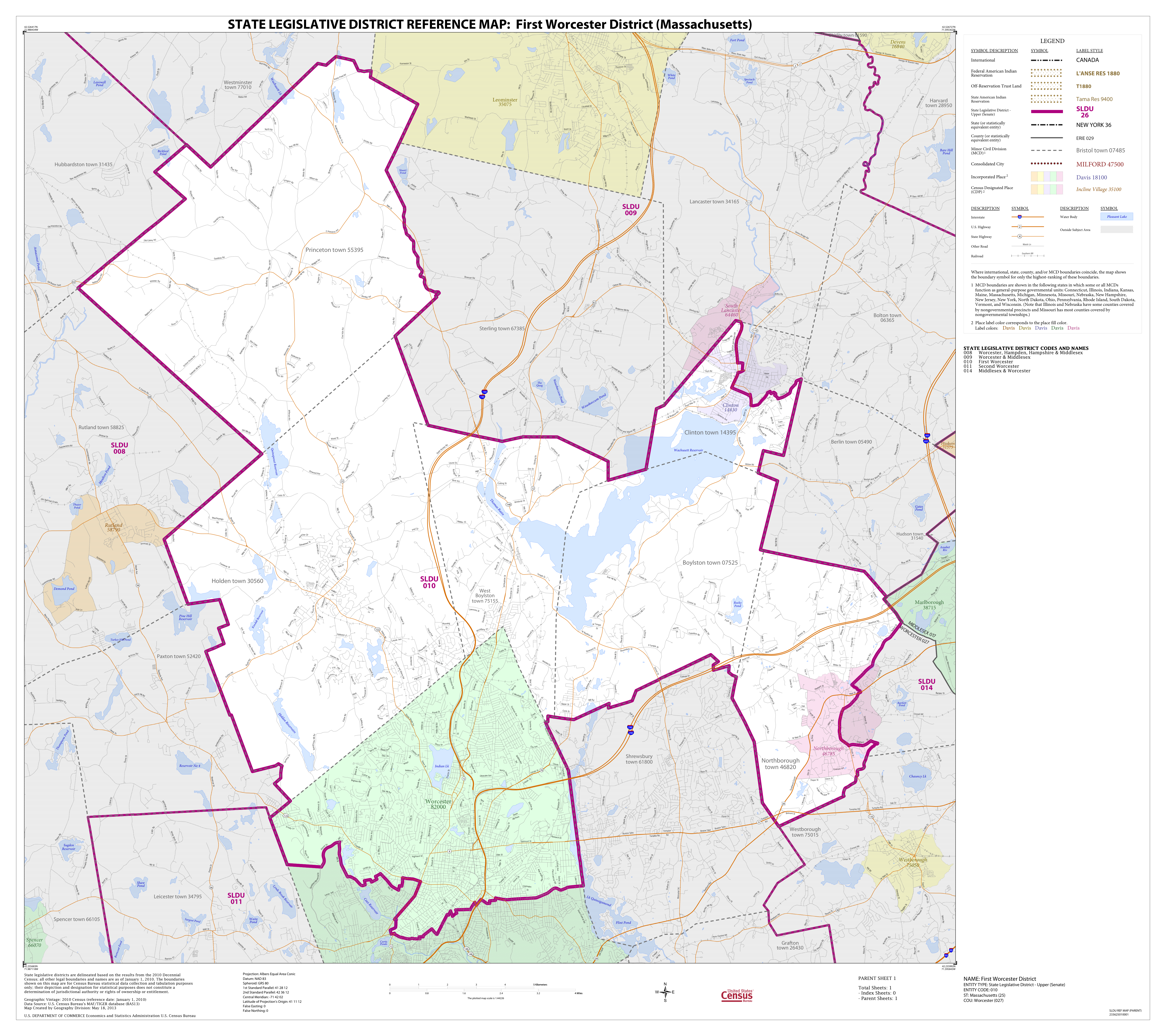
Map of Massachusetts Senate's 1st Worcester district, based on the 2010 United States census.

Massachusetts Senate's 1st Worcester district in the United States is one of 40 legislative districts of the Massachusetts Senate. It covers portions of Worcester county. Democrat Robyn Kennedy of Worcester has represented the district since 2023.

== Locales represented ==
The district includes the following localities:

- Boylston
- part of Clinton
- Holden
- part of Northborough
- Princeton
- West Boylston
- part of Worcester

== Senators ==
- Elmer Potter
- James Harrop
- Christian Nelson
- John S. Sullivan, 1933–1936
- Joseph Patrick McCooey, 1937–1940
- Charles F. Jeff Sullivan, 1941–1936
- William Daniel Fleming, circa 1957
- Vite Pigaga

Senator	Party	Years	Legis.	Electoral history	District towns
Daniel J. Foley	Democratic	c. 1969 – 1975	167th 168th	Elected in 1970. Re-elected in 1972.	
John J. Conte	Democratic	1975 — 1977	169th	Elected in 1974.	
Gerard D'Amico	Democratic	1977 — 1979	170th	Elected in 1976. Redistricted to Worcester district.	Boylston, Clinton, Shrewsbury, West Boylston, Worcester
Defunct from 1979 to 1995.
Robert A. Bernstein	Democratic	1995 – 2001	179th 180th 181st	Elected in 1994. Re-elected in 1996. Re-elected in 1998. Retired.	
Harriette L. Chandler	Democratic	2001 – 2023	182nd 183rd 184th 185th 186th 187th 188th 189th 190th 191st 192nd	Elected in 2000. Re-elected in 2002. Re-elected in 2004. Re-elected in 2006. Re-elected in 2008. Re-elected in 2010. Re-elected in 2012. Re-elected in 2014. Re-elected in 2016. Re-elected in 2018. Re-elected in 2020. Retired.	
Robyn Kennedy	Democratic	2023 –	193rd	Elected in 2022.	

== Images ==
Portraits of legislators

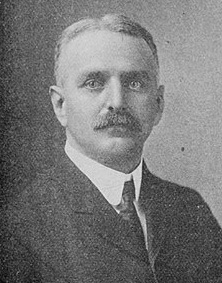
Elmer Potter

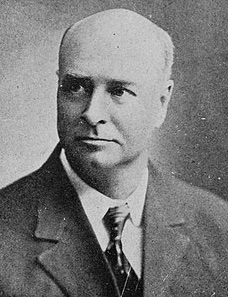
James Harrop

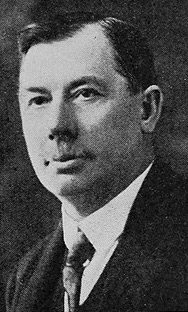
Christian Nelson

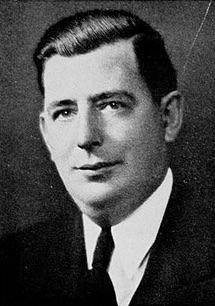
Charles F. Jeff Sullivan

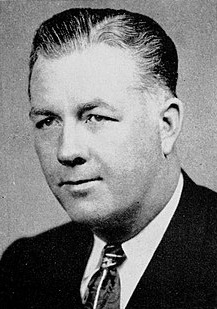
William Daniel Fleming

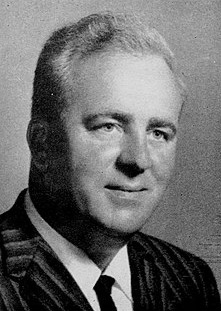
Vite Pigaga

== See also ==
- List of Massachusetts Senate elections
- List of Massachusetts General Courts
- List of former districts of the Massachusetts Senate
- Other Worcester County districts of the Massachusett Senate: 2nd; Hampshire, Franklin and Worcester; Middlesex and Worcester; Worcester, Hampden, Hampshire and Middlesex; Worcester and Middlesex; Worcester and Norfolk
- Worcester County districts of the Massachusetts House of Representatives: 1st, 2nd, 3rd, 4th, 5th, 6th, 7th, 8th, 9th, 10th, 11th, 12th, 13th, 14th, 15th, 16th, 17th, 18th
