= Massachusetts House of Representatives' 11th Worcester district =

American legislative district

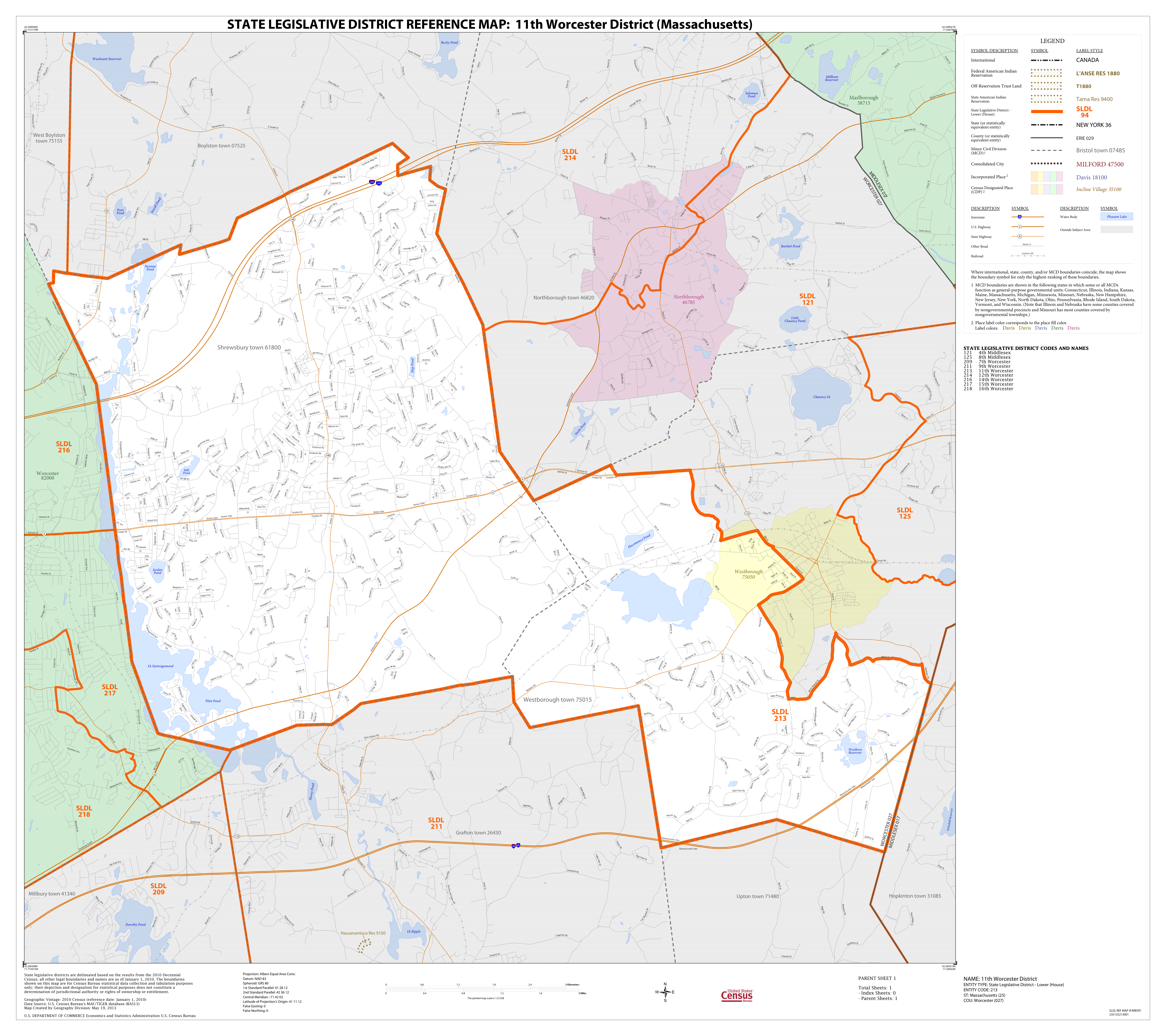
Map of Massachusetts House of Representatives' 11th Worcester district, based on the 2010 United States census.

Massachusetts House of Representatives' 11th Worcester district in the United States is one of 160 legislative districts included in the lower house of the Massachusetts General Court. It covers part of Worcester County. Republican Hannah Kane of Shrewsbury has represented the district since 2015.

== Locales represented ==
The district includes the following localities:

- Shrewsbury
- part of Westborough

The current district geographic boundary overlaps with those of the Massachusetts Senate's Middlesex and Worcester district and 2nd Worcester district.

=== Former locale ===
The district previously covered part of the city of Worcester, circa 1872.

== Representatives ==
- Samuel E. Blair, circa 1858
- Nelson Carpenter, circa 1859
- James Lally Jr., circa 1888
- Thomas McCooey, circa 1888
- John Carpenter Hull, circa 1920
- Alfred H. Whitney, circa 1920
- William Paul Constantino, circa 1951
- Albert Fairbanks Higgins, circa 1951
- Bessie I. Murray, 1957-58
- Leo R. Corazzini, circa 1975
- Ronald W. Gauch, 1993-2001
- Karyn Polito
- Matthew Beaton
- Hannah Kane, 2015-current

== Elections results from statewide races ==
| Year | Office | District Results | Statewide Results |
|---|---|---|---|
| 2012 | President | Obama 53.0 – 45.1% | Obama 60.7 – 37.5% |
| 2012 | Senator | Brown 55.2 – 44.0% | Warren 53.7 – 46.2% |
| 2013 | Senator | Gomez 55.8 – 43.8% | Markey 54.8 – 44.6% |
| 2014 | Governor | Baker 60.9 – 35.2% | Baker 48.4 – 46.5% |
| 2014 | Senator | Markey 49.8 – 45.6% | Markey 61.9 – 38.0% |
| 2016 | President | Clinton 56.4 – 34.1% | Clinton 60.0 – 32.8% |
| 2018 | Governor | Baker 74.9 – 23.0% | Baker 66.6 – 33.1% |
| 2018 | Senator | Warren 55.1 – 39.3% | Warren 60.3 – 36.2% |

== See also ==
- List of Massachusetts House of Representatives elections
- Other Worcester County districts of the Massachusetts House of Representatives: 1st, 2nd, 3rd, 4th, 5th, 6th, 7th, 8th, 9th, 10th, 12th, 13th, 14th, 15th, 16th, 17th, 18th
- Worcester County districts of the Massachusett Senate: 1st, 2nd; Hampshire, Franklin and Worcester; Middlesex and Worcester; Worcester, Hampden, Hampshire and Middlesex; Worcester and Middlesex; Worcester and Norfolk
- List of Massachusetts General Courts
- List of former districts of the Massachusetts House of Representatives

== Images ==
Portraits of legislators

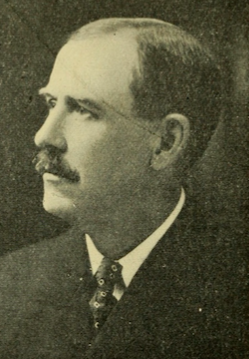
David Curtis Nickerson

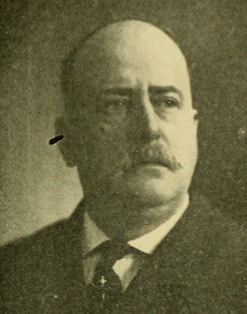
Frank Pope

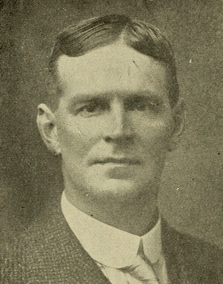
Edward Nutting

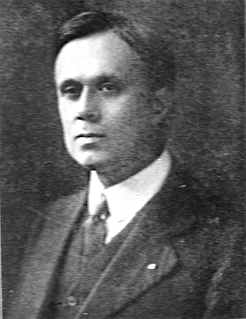
John Hull

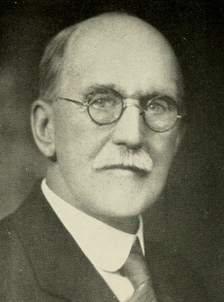
Henry Estabrook

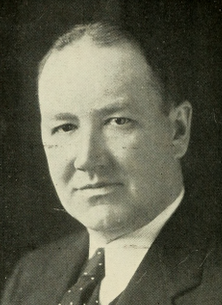
John Gilmartin

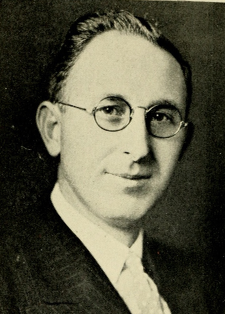
Fred Blake

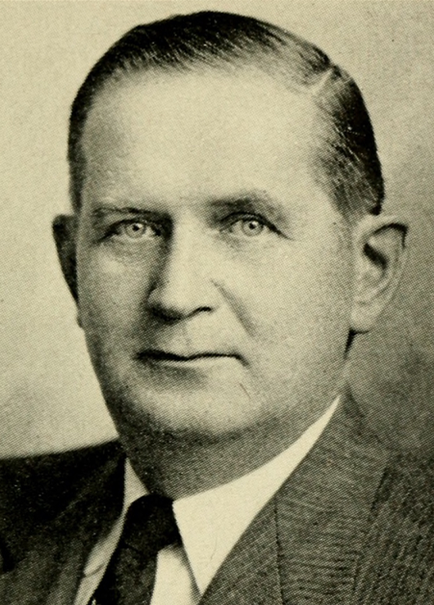
Eino Oliver Toko

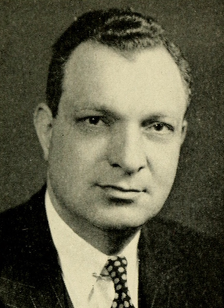
William Paul Constantino

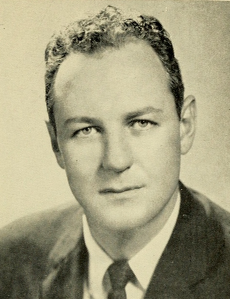
Thomas Fallon

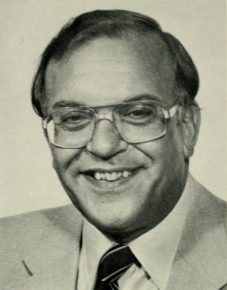
Leo Corazzini

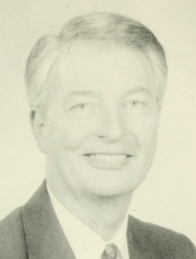
Ronald Gauch

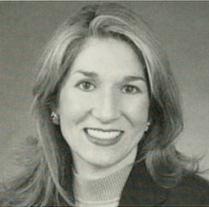
Karyn Polito
