= Bessie I. Murray =

American politician

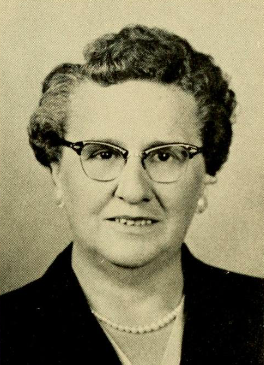

Member of the Massachusetts House of Representatives from the 11th Worcester district
- In office 1957–1958

Bessie I. Murray was an American Republican politician from Northborough, Massachusetts. She represented the 11th Worcester district in the Massachusetts House of Representatives from 1957 to 1958.

== See also ==
- 1957-1958 Massachusetts legislature
