= Massachusetts Senate's Hampshire, Franklin and Worcester district =

American legislative district

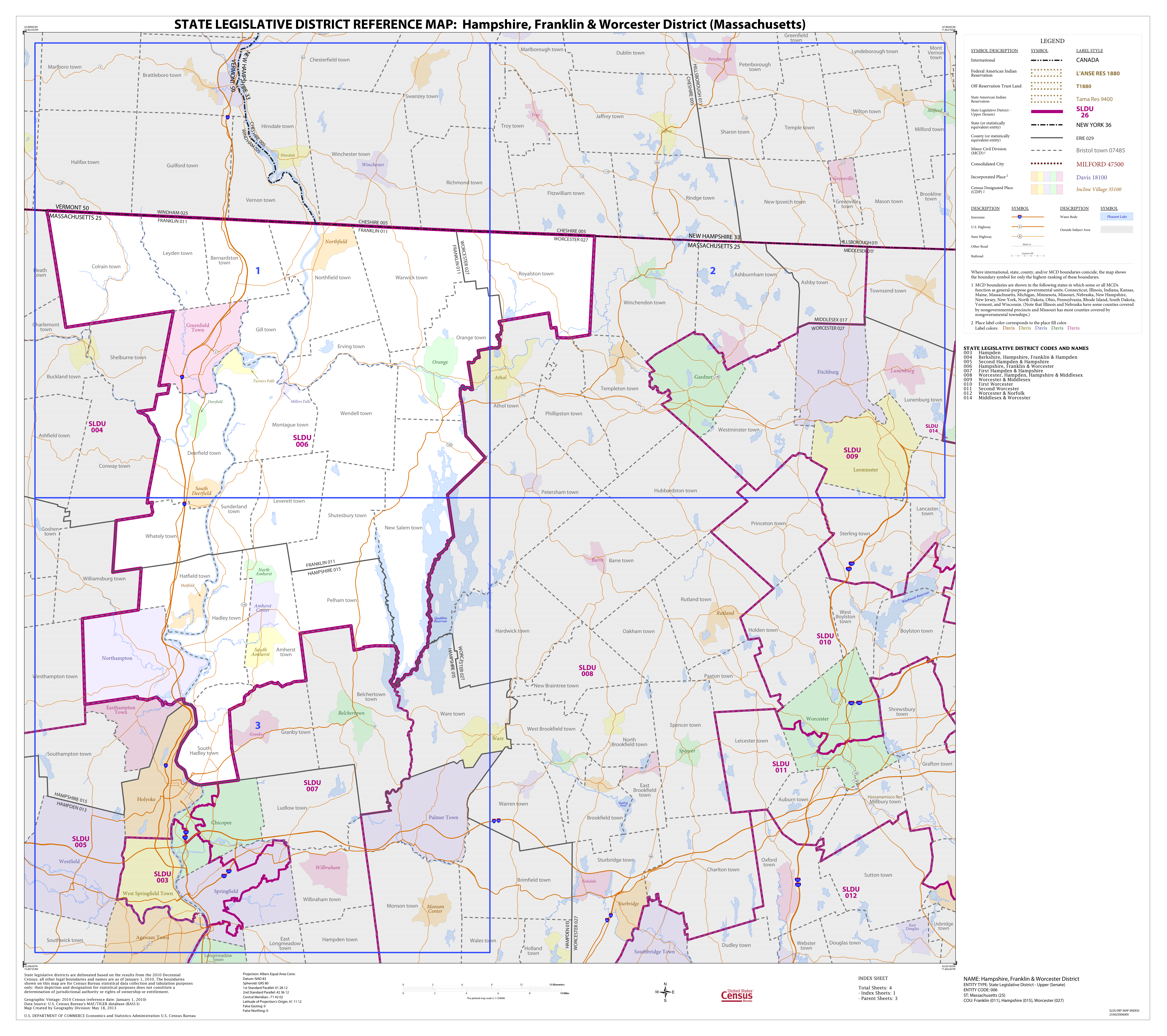
Map of Massachusetts Senate's Hampshire, Franklin and Worcester district, based on the 2010 United States census.

Massachusetts Senate's Hampshire, Franklin and Worcester district in the United States is one of 40 legislative districts of the Massachusetts Senate. It covers portions of Franklin, Hampshire, and Worcester counties. Since 2019 it is represented in the State Senate by Joanne M. Comerford of the Democratic Party. Comerford is running unopposed for re-election in the 2020 Massachusetts general election.

== Towns represented ==
The district includes the following localities:

- Amherst
- Bernardston
- Colrain
- Deerfield
- Erving
- Gill
- Greenfield
- Hadley
- Hatfield
- Leverett
- Leyden
- Montague
- New Salem
- Northampton
- Northfield
- Orange
- Pelham
- Royalston
- Shutesbury
- South Hadley
- Sunderland
- Warwick
- Wendell
- Whately

The current district geographic boundary overlaps with those of the Massachusetts House of Representatives' 2nd Berkshire, 1st Franklin, 2nd Franklin, 1st Hampshire, 2nd Hampshire, and 3rd Hampshire districts.

== Senators ==
- Stanley C. Rosenberg
- Joanne M. Comerford, 2019-current

== See also ==
- List of Massachusetts Senate elections
- List of Massachusetts General Courts
- List of former districts of the Massachusetts Senate
