= Massachusetts Senate's Worcester, Hampden, Hampshire and Middlesex district =

American legislative district

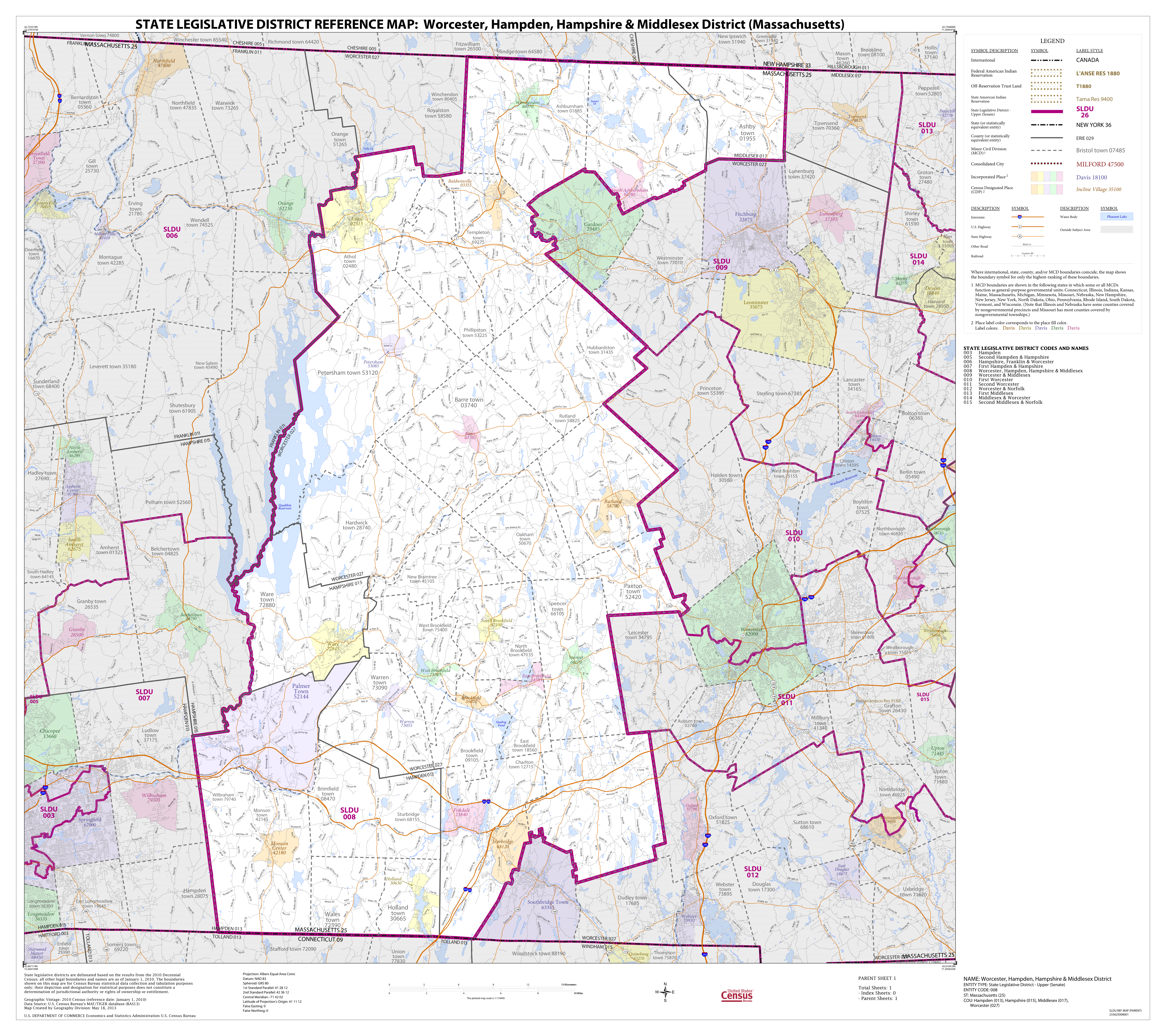
Map of Massachusetts Senate's Worcester, Hampden, Hampshire and Middlesex district, based on the 2010 United States census.

Massachusetts Senate's Worcester, Hampden, Hampshire and Middlesex district in the United States was one of 40 legislative districts of the Massachusetts Senate. It covered portions of Hampden, Hampshire, Middlesex, and Worcester counties. In the 2020 United States presidential election, the district was the only one in the state where incumbent President Donald Trump won. The district was last represented in the State Senate by Anne Gobi of the Democratic Party before it was abolished following 2021 redistricting.

== Towns represented ==
The district includes the following localities:

- Ashburnham
- Ashby
- Athol
- Barre
- Brimfield
- Brookfield
- Charlton
- East Brookfield
- Hardwick
- Holland
- Hubbardston
- Monson
- New Braintree
- North Brookfield
- Oakham
- Palmer
- Paxton
- Petersham
- Phillipston
- Rutland
- Spencer
- Sturbridge
- Templeton
- Wales
- Ware
- Warren
- West Brookfield
- Winchendon

== Senators ==
- Robert D. Wetmore
- Stephen Brewer
- Anne Gobi, 2015-2023

== See also ==
- List of Massachusetts Senate elections
- List of Massachusetts General Courts
- List of former districts of the Massachusetts Senate
