= Massachusetts Senate's Worcester and Hampden district =

American legislative district

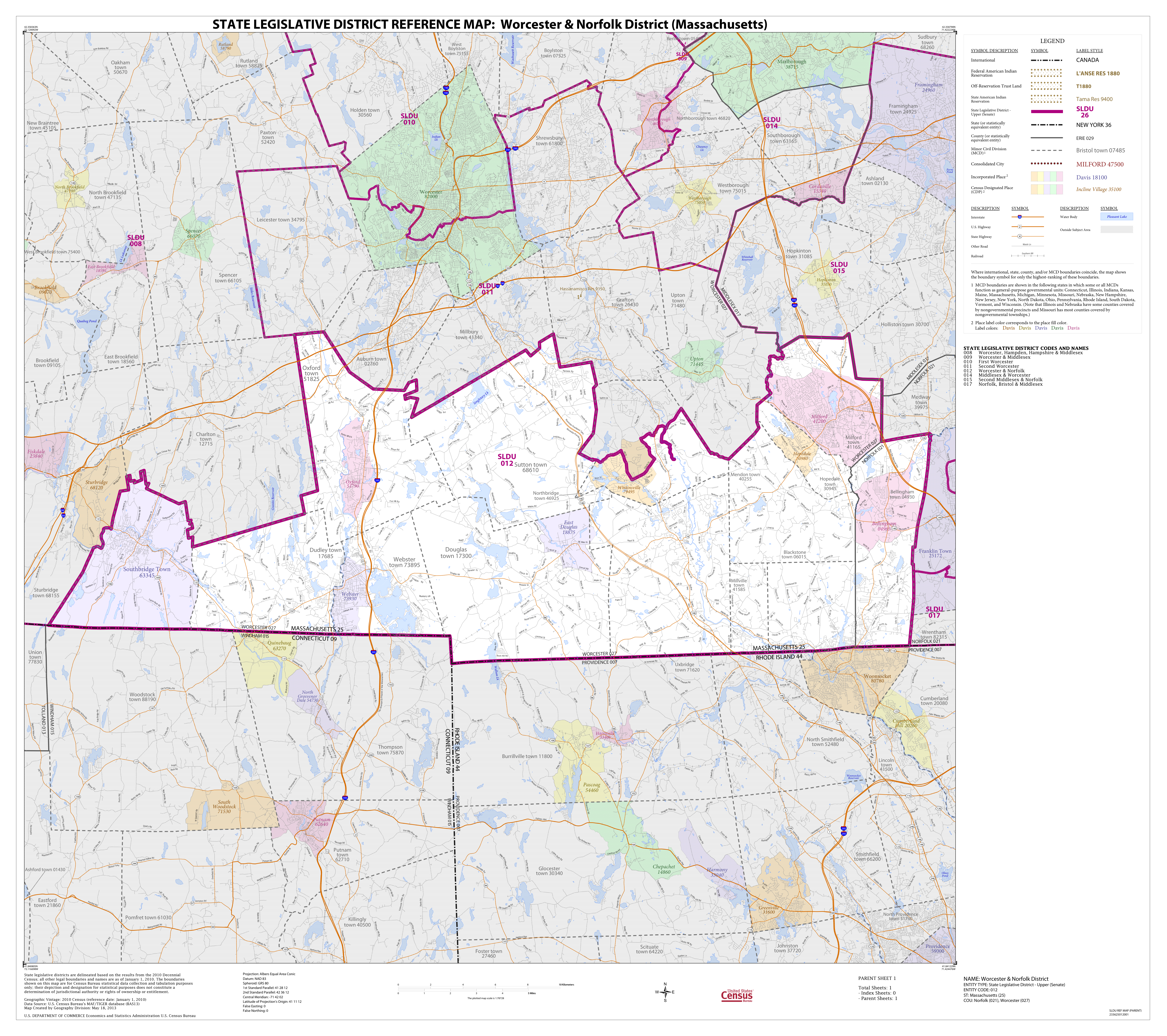
Map of Massachusetts Senate's Worcester and Norfolk district, the previous iteration of this district, based on the 2010 United States census.

Massachusetts Senate's Worcester and Hampden district in the United States is one of 40 legislative districts of the Massachusetts Senate. Ryan Fattman of Webster has represented the district since 2015.

== Towns represented ==
The district includes the following localities:

- Blackstone
- Brimfield
- Charlton
- Douglas
- Dudley
- Hopedale
- Mendon
- Millville
- Northbridge
- Oxford
- Southbridge
- Sturbridge
- Sutton
- Upton
- Uxbridge
- Wales
- Webster

== Senators ==
- James A. Kelly, circa 1975
- Louis Peter Bertonazzi, circa 1979-1993
- Richard T. Moore, circa 2002
- Ryan C. Fattman, 2015-current

== Images ==
Portraits of legislators

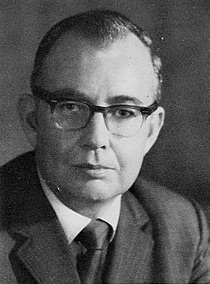
James A. Kelly

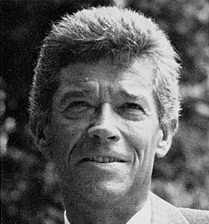
Louis Peter Bertonazzi

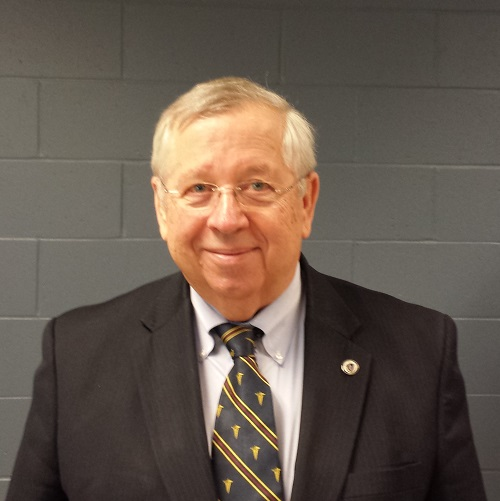
Richard Moore

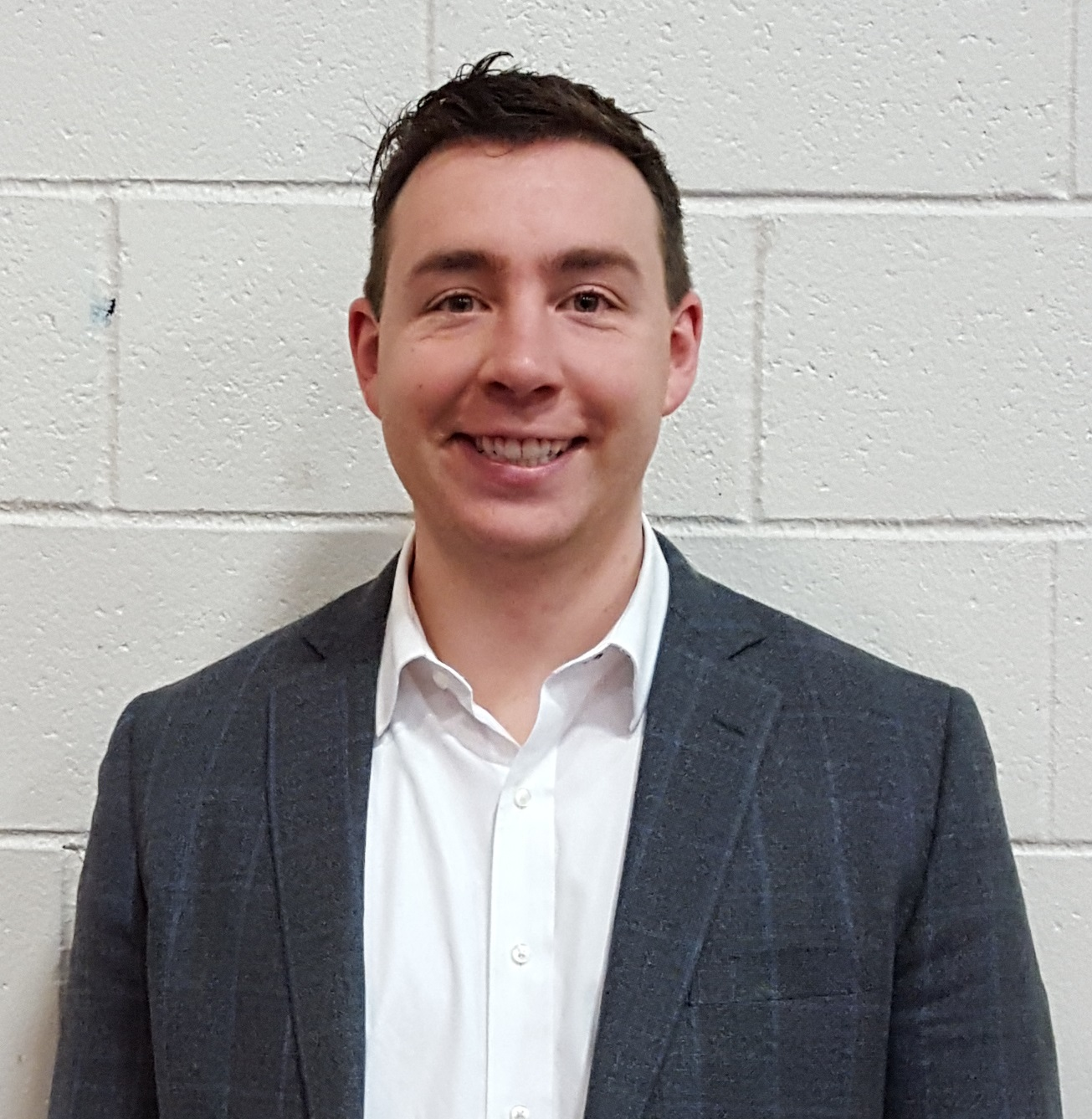
Ryan Fattman

== See also ==
- List of Massachusetts Senate elections
- List of Massachusetts General Courts
- List of former districts of the Massachusetts Senate
