= 2026 Massachusetts Attorney General election =

- November 3, 2026
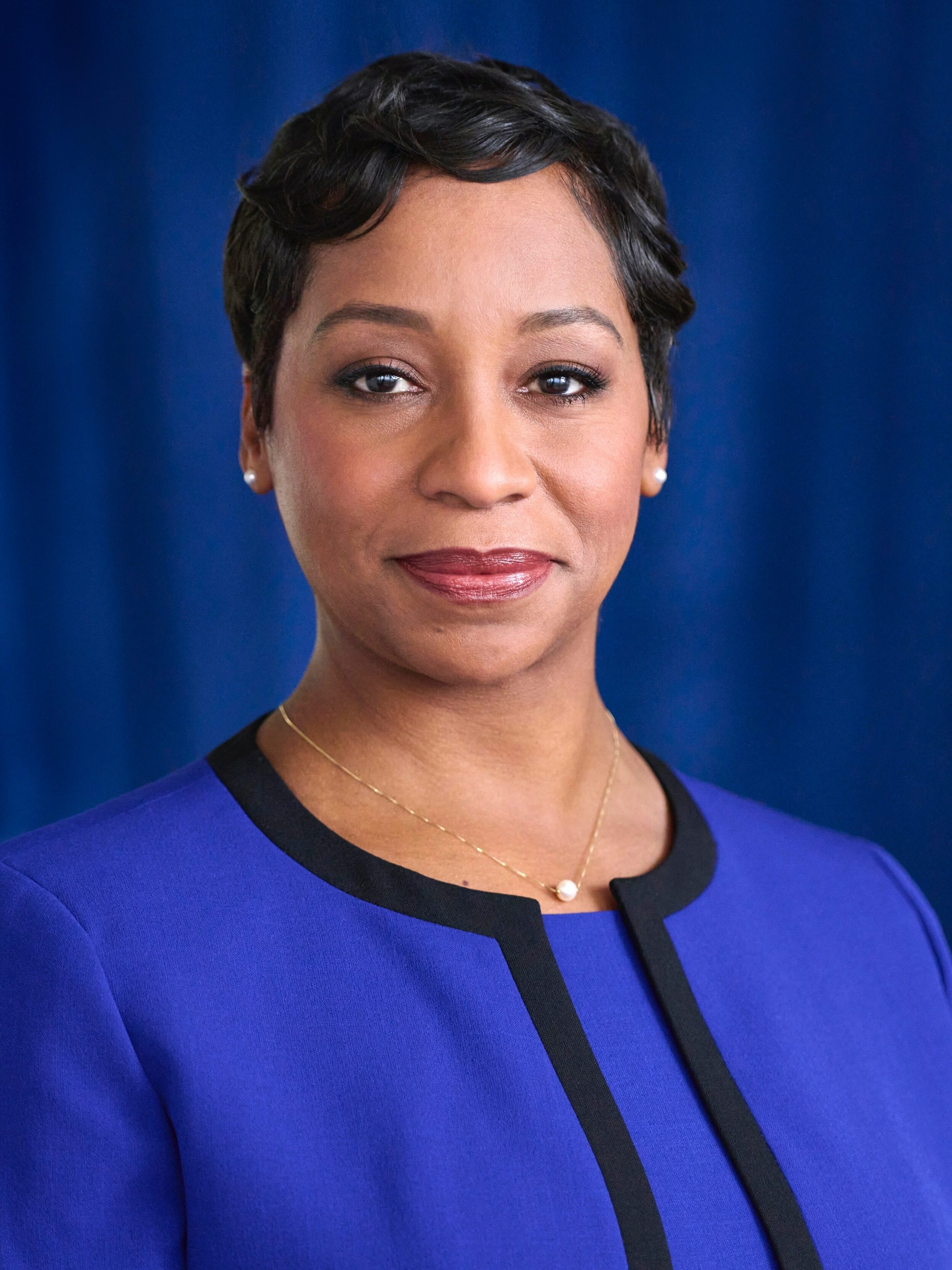

Nominee	Andrea Campbell	Michael Walsh
Party	Democratic	Republican
Popular vote	1,690,219	887,489
Percentage	65.5%	34.4%
attorney general before election
Andrea Campbell
Democratic
Elected attorney general
Andrea Campbell
Democratic

The 2026 Massachusetts Attorney General election was held on November 3, 2026, to elect the attorney general of Massachusetts. Incumbent Democratic Attorney General Andrea Campbell won re-election to a second term in office.

== Democratic primary ==
=== Candidates ===
==== Nominee ====
- Andrea Campbell, incumbent attorney general (2023–present)

=== Endorsements ===
Andrea Campbell

U.S. representatives

- Jim McGovern, U.S. representative from Massachusetts's 2nd congressional district (1997–present)

State legislators

- John Cronin, state senator from the Worcester and Middlesex district (2021–present)
- Kate Donaghue, state representative from the 19th Worcester district (2023–present)
- Dan Donahue, state representative from the 16th Worcester district (2013–present)
- Natalie Higgins, state representative from the 4th Worcester district (2017–present)
- Mary Keefe, state representative from the 15th Worcester district (2013–present)
- Robyn Kennedy, state senator from the 1st Worcester district (2023–present)
- David LeBoeuf, state representative from the 17th Worcester district (2019–present)
- John J. Mahoney, state representative from the 13th Worcester district (2011–present)
- Brian Murray, state representative from the 10th Worcester district (2017–present)
- Jonathan Zlotnik, state representative from the 2nd Worcester district (2013–present)

Organizations

- EMILYs List
- Massachusetts Democratic Party
- Planned Parenthood Action Fund
- Reproductive Freedom for All

=== Results ===
Democratic primary results
Party	Candidate	Votes	%
Democratic	Andrea Campbell (incumbent)	742,871	99.3
Write-in		5,222	0.7
Total votes		748,093	100.0

== Republican primary ==
=== Candidates ===
==== Nominee ====
- Michael Walsh, attorney

=== Endorsements ===
Michael Walsh

Political parties

- Massachusetts Republican Party

=== Results ===
Republican primary results
Party	Candidate	Votes	%
Republican	Michael Walsh	214,932	99.4
Write-in		1,317	0.6
Total votes		216,249	100.0

== General election ==
=== Predictions ===
Source	Ranking	As of
Sabato's Crystal Ball	Safe D	August 31, 2025

=== Polling ===
Poll source	Date(s) administered	Sample size (Note: Key: A – all adults RV – registered voters LV – likely voters V – unclear)	Margin of error	Andrea Campbell (D)	Michael Walsh (R)	Other	Undecided
Suffolk University (Note: Poll sponsored by The Boston Globe.)	October 14–18, 2026	500 (LV)	± 4.4%	54%	28%	2% (Note: "Refused" with 2%)	16%
UMass Amherst/YouGov (Note: Poll sponsored by WCVB-TV.)	October 5–12, 2026	800 (RV)	± 4.2%	55%	31%	3% (Note: "Other" with 3%)	11%

=== Results ===
2026 Massachusetts Attorney General election
Party	Candidate	Votes	%	±%
Democratic	Andrea Campbell (incumbent)			
Republican	Michael Walsh			
Write-in				
Total votes			100.0	

== Notes ==
Partisan clients
