= 2022 Massachusetts Attorney General election =

- November 8, 2022
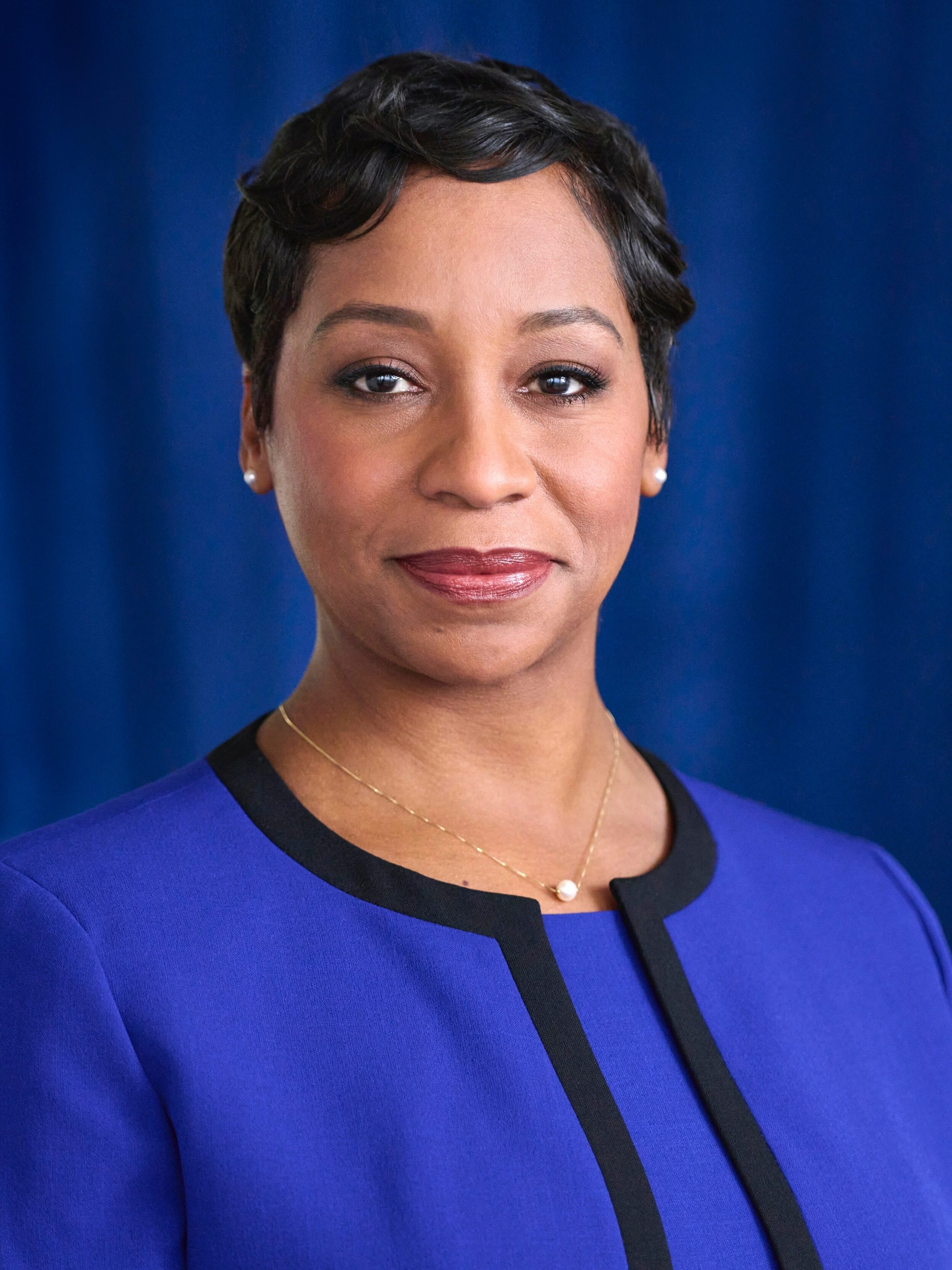

Nominee	Andrea Campbell	Jay McMahon
Party	Democratic	Republican
Popular vote	1,539,624	908,608
Percentage	62.85%	37.09%
- Campbell: 40–50% 50–60% 60–70% 70–80% 80–90% >90% McMahon: 40–50% 50–60% 60–70% 70–80% 80–90% Tie: 40–50% 50% No votes
Attorney General before election
Maura Healey
Democratic
Elected Attorney General
Andrea Campbell
Democratic

The 2022 Massachusetts Attorney General election took place on November 8, 2022, to elect the next attorney general of Massachusetts. Incumbent Democratic Attorney General Maura Healey was eligible to seek a third term, but instead announced she would run for governor.

== Democratic primary ==
=== Candidates ===
==== Nominee ====
- Andrea Campbell, former president of the Boston City Council and candidate for mayor of Boston in 2021

==== Eliminated in primary ====
- Shannon Liss-Riordan, labor attorney and candidate for U.S. Senate in 2020

==== Withdrew ====
- Quentin Palfrey, former deputy general counsel at the U.S. Department of Commerce and nominee for lieutenant governor in 2018 (endorsed Campbell; remained on ballot)

==== Declined ====
- Maura Healey, Massachusetts attorney general (2015–2023) (running for governor)
- Jon Mitchell, mayor of New Bedford
- Marian Ryan, Middlesex County district attorney (running for reelection)

=== Endorsements ===
Andrea Campbell

Federal officials

- Jake Auchincloss, U.S. Representative from Massachusetts's 4th congressional district (2021–)
- Katherine Clark, U.S. Representative from Massachusetts's 5th congressional district (2013–)
- Joe Kennedy III, former U.S. Representative from Massachusetts's 4th congressional district (2013–2021)
- Stephen Lynch, U.S. Representative from Massachusetts's 8th congressional district (Note: Numbered as the 9th district from 2001–2013) (2001–)
- Ed Markey, U.S. Senator from Massachusetts (2013–)
- Ayanna Pressley, U.S. Representative from Massachusetts's 7th congressional district (2019–)

State officials

- Maura Healey, incumbent Attorney General

State legislators

- Jon Cutler, state representative
- Ron Mariano, Speaker of the Massachusetts House of Representatives (2020–) from the 3rd Norfolk district (1991–)
- Karen Spilka, president of the Massachusetts Senate

Mayors

- Brian Arrigo, mayor of Revere

Individuals

- Danielle Allen, Harvard professor
- Barbara Lee, philanthropist

Newspapers

- The Boston Globe

Organizations

- Democracy for America
- EMILY's List
- Planned Parenthood Advocacy Fund of Massachusetts

Labor unions

- Service Employees International Union State Council
Shannon Liss-Riordan

Federal officials

- Elizabeth Warren, U.S. Senator from Massachusetts (2013–present)

District attorneys

- Michael W. Morrissey, District Attorney of Norfolk County

State legislators

- Jamie Belsito, state representative
- Mike Connolly, state representative
- Carol Doherty, state representative
- Paul Feeney, state senator
- Anne Gobi, state senator (previously endorsed Palfrey)
- Ken Gordon, state representative
- Christopher Markey, state representative
- Adam Scanlon, state representative (previously endorsed Palfrey)
- Erika Uyterhoeven, state representative

City officials

- Kim Janey, acting Mayor of Boston (2021)
- Michelle Wu, Mayor of Boston (2021–present)

City councilmembers

- Jesse Clingan, Somerville councilman
- Ben Ewen-Campen, Somerville councilman
- Matt McLaughlin, Somerville councilman
- Jonathan Paz, Waltham city councilman
- Holly Ryan, Newton city councilor (previously endorsed Palfrey)
- Jake Wilson, Somerville councilman

Individuals

- Jay Gonzalez, former Secretary of Administration and Finance of Massachusetts (2009–2013) and Democratic nominee for governor in 2018
- Sara Nelson, international president of the Association of Flight Attendants

Unions

- Alliance of Unions of the MBTA
- CWA Local 201
- IBEW Local 1228
- Iron Workers Local 7
- Massachusetts AFL–CIO
- National Association of Government Employees
- OPEIU Local 453
- Painters and Allied Trades District Council 35
- Pipefitters Local 537
- Plasterers and Cement Masons Local 534
- SEIU Local 888
- Sheet Metal Workers Local 17
- Sheet Metal Workers Local 63
- Teamsters Local 122
- UNITE HERE New England Joint Board
- United Steelworkers District 4

Organizations

- Our Revolution Massachusetts (previously endorsed Palfrey)
Quentin Palfrey (withdrew)

State officials

- James Aloisi, former Massachusetts Secretary of Transportation (2009)
- Philip W. Johnston, former Secretary of Health and Human Services of Massachusetts (1984–1991)

State legislators

- ~~Anne Gobi, state senator~~ (switched endorsement to Liss-Riordan after Palfrey withdrew)
- Natalie Higgins, state representative from the 4th Worcester district (2017–)
- Jack Patrick Lewis, state representative from the 7th Middlesex district (2017–)
- Brian Murray, state representative from the 10th Worcester district (2017–)
- Steven Owens, state representative from the 29th Middlesex district (2021–)
- Matthew Patrick, former state representative from the 3rd Barnstable district (2001–2011)
- Lois Pines, former state senator from the 1st Middlesex and Norfolk district (1987–1999)
- ~~Adam Scanlon, state representative from the 14th Bristol district (2021–)~~ (switched endorsements to Liss-Riordan after Palfrey withdrew)
- Eric Turkington, former state representative from the Barnstable, Dukes and Nantucket district (1989–2009)

Local officials

- Susan Albright, Newton city council president
- Caroline Bays, Watertown city councilor
- Susan Falkoff, former Watertown at-large councilor
- Bill Humphrey, Newton city councilor
- David Kalis, Newton city councilor
- Jesse Lederman, member of the Springfield, Massachusetts city council
- Richard Lipof, Newton city council vice-president
- ~~Holly Ryan, Newton city councilor~~ (switched endorsements to Liss-Riordan after Palfrey withdrew)
- Greg Schwartz, former Newton city councilor
- Adam Steiner, Framingham city councilman
- Cesar Stewart-Morales, Framingham city councilman
- Ty Waterman, Attleboro city councilor

Individuals

- Donald Berwick, former administrator of the Centers for Medicare & Medicaid Services (2010–2011)
- Victoria Danberg, Newton city councilor

Organizations

- Massachusetts Democratic Party
- Massachusetts Sierra Club
- ~~Our Revolution Massachusetts~~ (switched endorsements to Liss-Riordan after Palfrey withdrew)

=== Debates ===
2022 Massachusetts Attorney General Democratic primary debates
No.	Date	Host	Moderator	Link	Democratic	Democratic	Democratic
Key: P Participant A Absent N Not invited I Invited W Withdrawn							
Key: P Participant A Absent N Not invited I Invited W Withdrawn					Andrea Campbell	Shannon Liss-Riordan	Quentin Palfrey
1	Aug. 1, 2022	WGBH-TV	Jim Braude	YouTube	P	P	P
2	Aug. 10, 2022	WBUR-FM; The Boston Globe; WCVB-TV	Tiziana Dearing; Sharman Sacheti	YouTube	P	P	P

=== Polling ===
Poll source	Date(s) administered	Sample size (Note: Key: A – all adults RV – registered voters LV – likely voters V – unclear)	Margin of error	Andrea Campbell	Shannon Liss-Riordan	Quentin Palfrey	Other	Undecided
UMass Amherst	August 26–29, 2022	500 (LV)	± 5.1%	28%	29%	11%	1%	31%
UMass Lowell	August 16–25, 2022	800 (LV)	± 3.9%	32%	30%	11%	2%	25%
Advantage, Inc. (R) (Note: Poll sponsored by the Massachusetts Fiscal Alliance, a Republican-aligned group)	August 22–23, 2022	563 (LV)	± 4.1%	25%	20%	5%	–	49%
MassINC Polling Group (D) (Note: Poll sponsored by Priorities for Progress, a Democratic-aligned group)	August 19–21, 2022	401 (LV)	± 4.9%	28%	26%	10%	2%	32%
MassINC Polling Group	August 5–9, 2022	520 (LV)	± 5.1%	24%	16%	4%	4%	50%
UMass Amherst	June 15–21, 2022	557 (LV)	± 4.7%	21%	11%	9%	0%	59%
MassINC Polling Group (D)	June 2022	– (LV)	–	24%	6%	12%	4%	50%
UMass Lowell	April 2–11, 2022	800 (LV)	± 3.9%	30%	11%	6%	2%	52%
MassINC Polling Group (D)	January 18–20, 2022	310 (LV)	± 5.6%	31%	3%	2%	2%	54%

=== Results ===
==== Convention ====
Democratic convention vote first round, June 4
Party	Candidate	Votes	%
Democratic	Andrea Campbell	1,622	39.2
Democratic	Quentin Palfrey	1,605	38.8
Democratic	Shannon Liss-Riordan	906	21.9
Total votes		4,133	100.0%

Democratic convention vote second round, June 4
Party	Candidate	Votes	%
Democratic	Quentin Palfrey	1,920	54
Democratic	Andrea Campbell	1,631	46
Total votes		3,551	100%

==== Primary ====
Results by Municipality: Campbell: 30–40%; 40–50%; 50–60%; 60–70%; Liss-Riordan: 30–40%; 40–50%; 50–60%

Results by precinct: Campbell: 30–40%; 40–50%; 50–60%; 60–70%; 70–80%; 80–90%; 90–100%; Liss-Riordan: 30–40%; 40–50%; 50–60%; Palfrey: 40–50%; Tie No data/No votes

Democratic primary results
Party	Candidate	Votes	%
Democratic	Andrea Campbell	365,362	50.10%
Democratic	Shannon Liss-Riordan	248,648	34.10%
Democratic	Quentin Palfrey (withdrawn)	115,200	15.80%
Total votes		729,210	100.0%

== Republican primary ==
=== Candidates ===
==== Nominee ====
- Jay McMahon, Bourne attorney and nominee for attorney general in 2018

==== Declined ====
- Andrew Lelling, former U.S. Attorney for the District of Massachusetts

=== Results ===
Republican primary results
Party	Candidate	Votes	%
Republican	James R. McMahon, III	215,283	100.0%
Total votes		215,283	100.0%

== General election ==
=== Pre-primary candidate forum ===
2022 Massachusetts Attorney General pre-primary candidate forum
No.	Date	Host	Moderator	Link	Democratic	Democratic	Republican	Democratic
Key: P Participant A Absent N Not invited I Invited W Withdrawn								
Key: P Participant A Absent N Not invited I Invited W Withdrawn					Andrea Campbell	Shannon Liss-Riordan	James McMahon	Quentin Palfrey
1	May 23, 2022	Rappaport Center for Law and Public Policy	Kimberly Atkins; Stohr	YouTube	P	P	A	P

=== Debate ===
2022 Massachusetts Attorney General debate
No.	Date	Host	Moderator	Link	Democratic	Republican
Key: P Participant A Absent N Not invited I Invited W Withdrawn						
Key: P Participant A Absent N Not invited I Invited W Withdrawn					Andrea Campbell	James McMahon
1	Oct. 21, 2022	WBZ-TV	Jon Keller	YouTube	P	P

=== Predictions ===
Source	Ranking	As of
Sabato's Crystal Ball	Safe D	September 14, 2022
Elections Daily	Safe D	November 1, 2022

=== Polling ===
Poll source	Date(s) administered	Sample size	Margin of error	Andrea Campbell (D)	James McMahon (R)	Other	Undecided
UMass Amherst/YouGov	October 20–26, 2022	700 (RV)	± 4.3%	58%	33%	1% (Note: "Other" with 1%)	7%
UMass Lowell/YouGov	October 18–25, 2022	1,000 (LV)	± 4.1%	55%	28%	0% (Note: "Another candidate" with 0%)	16%
Suffolk University	October 13–16, 2022	500 (LV)	± 4.4%	50%	30%	1% (Note: "Refused" with 1%)	19%
Suffolk University	September 10–13, 2022	500 (RV)	± 4.4%	50%	24%	1%	25%

=== Results ===
2022 Massachusetts Attorney General election
Party	Candidate	Votes	%	±%
Democratic	Andrea Campbell	1,539,624	62.85%	−7.06%
Republican	James R. McMahon, III	908,608	37.09%	+7.07%
Write-in		1,550	0.06%	-0.01%
Total votes		2,449,782	100.0%	
Democratic hold				

==== By county ====
By county

County	Andrea Campbell Democratic		James McMahon III Republican		Write-in	
County	#	%	#	%	#	%
Barnstable	65,521	56.14%	51,152	43.83%	40	0.03%
Berkshire	34,950	72.05%	13,542	27.92%	14	0.03%
Bristol	95,882	53.1%	84,650	46.88%	53	0.03%
Dukes	7,044	76.06%	2,214	23.91%	3	0.03%
Essex	172,011	60.97%	109,943	38.97%	185	0.07%
Franklin	22,108	70.79%	9,110	29.17%	13	0.04%
Hampden	73,936	54.28%	62,192	45.65%	95	0.07%
Hampshire	46,092	71.97%	17,895	27.94%	56	0.09%
Middlesex	416,872	69.85%	179,542	30.09%	356	0.06%
Nantucket	3,152	65.3%	1,674	34.68%	1	0.02%
Norfolk	177,169	63.22%	102,886	36.71%	175	0.06%
Plymouth	110,012	51.96%	101,635	48.0%	79	0.04%
Suffolk	157,594	79.35%	40,698	20.49%	315	0.16%
Worcester	157,281	54.44%	131,475	45.51%	165	0.06%
Totals	1,539,624	62.85%	908,608	37.09%	1,550	0.06%

==== By congressional district ====
Campbell won all nine congressional districts.

District	Campbell	McMahon	Representative
1st	57%	43%	Richard Neal
2nd	62%	38%	Jim McGovern
3rd	60%	40%	Lori Trahan
4th	61%	39%	Jake Auchincloss
5th	73%	27%	Katherine Clark
6th	60%	40%	Seth Moulton
7th	85%	15%	Ayanna Pressley
8th	63%	37%	Stephen Lynch
9th	54%	46%	Bill Keating

== Notes ==
Partisan clients
