= Salvatore Cimino =

American politician

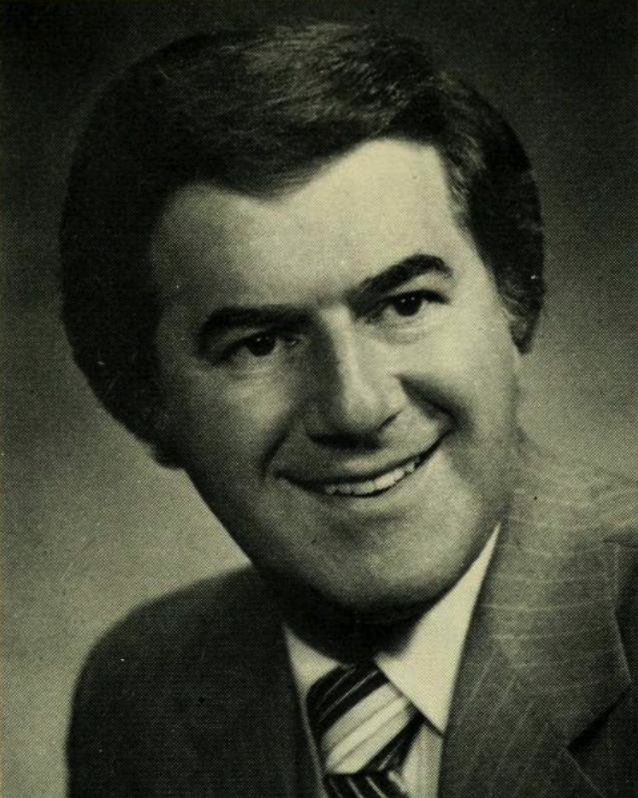
- Official portrait, circa 1979

Member of the Massachusetts House of Representatives from the 10th Worcester district
- In office January 3, 1979 – January 7, 1981
- Preceded by: Richard T. Moore
- Succeeded by: Marie Parente

Personal details
- Born: Salvatore Peter Cimino; October 27, 1933 (age 92) Milford, Massachusetts
- Party: Democratic
- Education: Cornell University

Salvatore Peter Cimino (born October 27, 1933) is an American politician who served one term in the Massachusetts House of Representatives. He lost reelection in 1980 to Marie Parente, who challenged him as an independent.

Massachusetts House of Representatives
Preceded by Richard T. Moore	Massachusetts Representative from the 10th Worcester District; 1979–1981	Succeeded by Marie Parente
