= Jim O'Day =

American politician

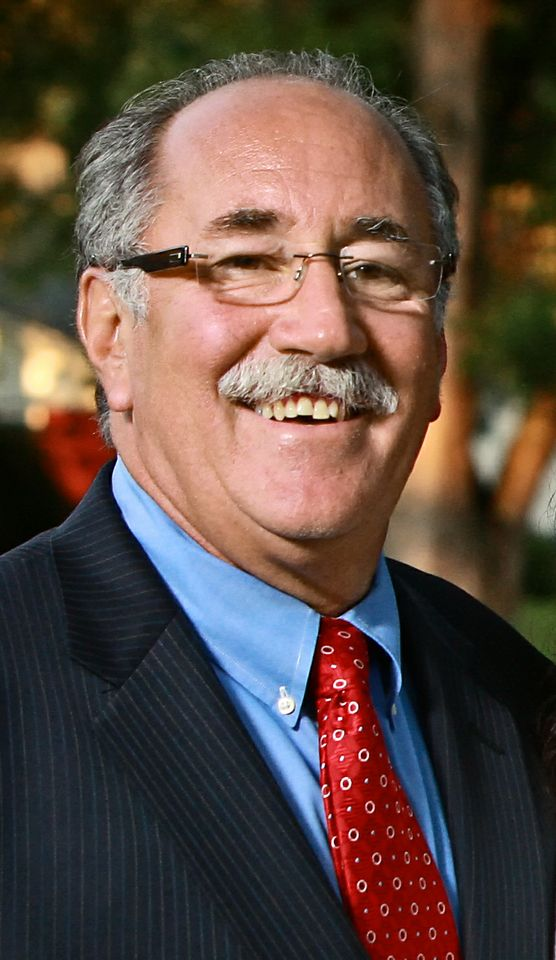
- O'Day in September 2012

Member of the Massachusetts House of Representatives from the 14th Worcester district
- Incumbent
- Assumed office May 3, 2007
- Preceded by: James B. Leary

Personal details
- Born: James J. O'Day; May 23, 1954 (age 72) Worcester, Massachusetts, United States
- Party: Democratic
- Spouse: Marybeth Murphy
- Children: 4 sons
- Education: Worcester State University
- Occupation: Social worker
- Website: www.repjimoday.com

James J. O'Day (born May 23, 1954 in Worcester) is an American social worker and politician in the Massachusetts House of Representatives.

== Career ==
Born and raised in Worcester, O'Day attended Worcester Academy, then received his Bachelor of Science degree in urban studies and management from Worcester State University in 1983. After college, O'Day became a social worker for the Commonwealth of Massachusetts Department of Social Services, where he worked for 24 years.

In 2007, O'Day ran in a special election to represent the 14th Worcester district in the Massachusetts House of Representatives. He won the election in April 2007 and was sworn in the following month. He is also a member of the Steering, Policy, and Scheduling Committee.

== Personal life ==
O'Day is married to Marybeth Murphy, with whom he has four sons: Tyler, Max, Patrick, and Kevin. The family resides in West Boylston, Massachusetts.

== See also ==
- 2019–2020 Massachusetts legislature
- 2021–2022 Massachusetts legislature
