= Guy Glodis =

American politician

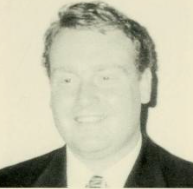
- Glodis circa 2003

Sheriff of Worcester County, Massachusetts
- In office 2005–2011
- Preceded by: John M. Flynn
- Succeeded by: Lewis Evangelidis

Member of the Massachusetts Senate from the Second Worcester District
- In office 1999–2005
- Preceded by: Matthew J. Amorello
- Succeeded by: Edward M. Augustus, Jr.

Member of the Massachusetts House of Representatives from the 16th Worcester District
- In office 1997–1999
- Preceded by: William Glodis
- Succeeded by: John Fresolo

Personal details
- Born: February 15, 1969 (age 57)
- Party: Democratic
- Education: University of Massachusetts Amherst
- Occupation: Temporary Correctional Officer; Politician

Guy William Glodis (born February 15, 1969, in Worcester, Massachusetts) is an American politician who served as Sheriff of Worcester County, Massachusetts, from 2005 to 2011. Prior to becoming Sheriff, Glodis served in the Massachusetts Senate and the Massachusetts House of Representatives.

He was an unsuccessful candidate for Massachusetts State Auditor in 2010.

He is the son of former State Representative William Glodis.
