= Ryan Fattman =

American state legislator

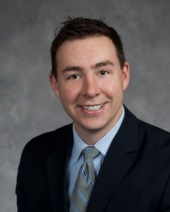

Member of the Massachusetts Senate from the Worcester and Hampden district
- Incumbent
- Assumed office January 7, 2015
- Preceded by: Richard T. Moore

Member of the Massachusetts House of Representatives from the 18th Worcester district
- In office January 5, 2011 – January 7, 2015
- Preceded by: Jennifer Callahan
- Succeeded by: Joseph D. McKenna

Member of the Sutton, Massachusetts Board of Selectmen
- In office 2006–2011

Personal details
- Born: Ryan C. Fattman; July 1, 1984 (age 42) Sutton, Massachusetts, U.S.
- Party: Republican
- Spouse: Stephanie Kotseas (m. 2013)
- Children: 4
- Education: Suffolk University (BA); Tufts University (MPP)
- Occupation: Politician
- Website: www.fattman.com

Ryan C. Fattman (born July 1, 1984) is an American politician who currently serves in the Massachusetts State Senate. Previously, Fattman represented the 18th Worcester district in the Massachusetts House of Representatives as a Republican.

== Early life and education ==
A native of Sutton, Fattman graduated from Sutton High School in 2003. He then received a Bachelor of Arts in Government from Suffolk University in 2007 and a Master of Public Policy from Tufts University in 2010. While at Tufts, Fattman received a Public Policy Summer Fellowship from the Rappaport Institute for Greater Boston of Harvard University.

== Political career ==
In 2006, while a student at Suffolk, Fattman launched his political career by announcing his candidacy for the Sutton Board of Selectman. On May 23, he earned seventy-percent of the vote, defeating two long-term incumbents. At the age of twenty-two, Fattman became the youngest selectman in the history of the town and Massachusetts. He was reelected in 2009 for a second term that lasted until 2011. During Fattman's tenure, he was credited with the restoration of Marion's Camp, a public beach in Sutton, senior citizen property tax relief, town capital stabilization, and improved cell phone coverage. He also worked as a Quality Assurance Analyst for MassHousing during this time.

In 2010, Fattman ran for a seat in the Massachusetts House of Representatives. In a close race, he defeated the eight-year incumbent Jennifer Callahan for the 18th Worcester district seat. The Worcester Telegram described the win as "the most surprising upset" in Central Massachusetts. The Boston Globe called Fattman the "...new standard bearer for beleaguered Massachusetts Republications." He remained in the House for two terms from 2011 through 2015.

In 2014, Fattman was elected to the Massachusetts State Senate, becoming the first Republican to hold the Worcester and Hampden (then Worcester and Norfolk) seat since 1938. He defeated the twenty-two year incumbent Richard T. Moore.

On March 17, 2021, Fattman and members of the Republican Town Committee in Sutton filed a lawsuit against Michael Sullivan, Director of the Massachusetts Office of Campaign and Political Finance, concerning the manner in which the office was conducting investigations into potential violations of state campaign finance rules by Fattman and related campaign committees. A request by Fattman and the other plaintiffs to block Sullivan from providing evidence to the Massachusetts Attorney General was denied on March 30. Fattman has denied the allegations and insisted that all campaign contributions were legal and common practice.

== Personal life ==
Fattman met his wife, Stephanie Kotseas, at Sutton High School. She is currently the Worcester County Register of Probate. The couple, who has four children, currently resides in Sutton, Massachusetts.

== See also ==
- 2019–2020 Massachusetts legislature
- 2021–2022 Massachusetts legislature
