= Shannon Liss-Riordan =

American labor attorney (born 1969)

- Liss-Riordan in 2022

Personal details
- Born: 1969 (age 56–57)
- Party: Democratic
- Education: Harvard University (BA, JD)
- Website: Lichten & Liss-Riordan, P.C., Bio

Shannon Liss-Riordan (née Liss; born 1969) is an American labor attorney. She is best known for her class-action cases against companies such as Uber, FedEx, and Starbucks. Liss-Riordan was a candidate in the 2020 United States Senate election in Massachusetts, unsuccessfully challenging incumbent Ed Markey for his senate seat.

Liss-Riordan also unsuccessfully ran for the Democratic nomination for Massachusetts attorney general in the 2022 Massachusetts Attorney General election.

== Early life and education ==
Shannon Liss grew up in Houston, Texas. She graduated with a bachelor's degree from Harvard College in 1990, after which she went to work for women's movement leader, Bella Abzug. An activist during the early 1990s and the feminist movement, Liss-Riordan co-founded the Third Wave Direct Action Coalition with writer Rebecca Walker to "mobilize young women." She was coordinator of a seminar at Hunter College in 1992, which featured lawyer Anita Hill and other feminist leaders.

While a first-year student at Harvard Law School, in 1994 Liss organized an auction that featured a copy of the Constitution signed by Justice Ruth Bader Ginsburg and a copy of the Roe v. Wade decision signed by Justice Harry Blackmun and other items. She also wrote a column in the law school newspaper. In 1996, Liss graduated from Harvard Law School.

== Career ==
After law school, Liss-Riordan clerked for two years for Judge Nancy F. Atlas of the United States District Court for the Southern District of Texas. In 1998, she joined the Boston labor law firm, Pyle Rome Lichten & Ehrenberg, where she became a partner in 2002, litigating employment rights, First Amendment, and other labor cases. In 2009, Liss-Riordan co-founded the firm Lichten & Liss-Riordan, where she has been recognized as one of the nation's leading attorneys protecting workers' rights.

Early in her career, Liss-Riordan won two disability discrimination trials in federal court, in 2002 against the Boston Police Department on behalf of a hearing-impaired police recruit, and later that year for a deaf airline mechanic who had been denied a job from United Airlines. In 2002, she won a First Amendment case reinstating a State Police recruit who had been disqualified because he owned two adult bookstores. Starting in 2001, Liss-Riordan began a string of more 40 cases representing waitstaff challenging their employers for taking a share of their tips. This line of cases developed a previously unused 1952 Massachusetts law protecting tipped employees and resulted in verdicts against the Hilltop Steak House, the Federalist restaurant, and other settlements including against the Four Seasons Hotel, the Weston Golf Club, Northeastern University, the Palm, Ruth's Chris, and Starbucks. She then sued establishments in other states and won victories and settlements in New York, Florida, Hawaii, and California. In 2006, Liss-Riordan won a class action discrimination lawsuit against the state of Massachusetts, where the court ruled that a civil service cognitive ability test discriminated against minority applicants. A federal judge ordered fire departments across Massachusetts to offer jobs to about 50 minority firefighter applicants. In 2008, Liss-Riordan brought a series of cases for skycaps against American Airlines, United Airlines, and US Airways claiming they had retained a $2 baggage fee that passengers believed was a tip for the workers. In the case against American Airlines, a jury ruled for the skycaps and found that American had violated the Massachusetts tips law. After the trial, the airlines dropped the charge nationwide. The cases received extensive coverage from the Boston Globe, including an editorial “Kicked at the Curb”, and earned Liss-Riordan the nickname “Sledgehammer Shannon”.

In 2005, Liss-Riordan began suing many companies for misclassifying their workers as independent contractors. She sued FedEx, ultimately winning for drivers in Massachusetts and obtaining multimillion dollar settlements. She challenged the cleaning industry for misclassifying mostly immigrant workers as franchisees, winning victories against companies including Coverall and Jani-King. The Massachusetts Supreme Judicial Court ruled that these companies misused the franchise model to “sell low-paying jobs”, a practice they then stopped in Massachusetts. Liss-Riordan continued to challenge them in other states, including California, where she won rulings that Jan-Pro misclassified franchisees and had to reimburse them for expenses. Liss-Riordan also sued many strip clubs for misclassifying dancers and taking part of their tips. She headed more than a dozen class action lawsuits, which led to litigation that swept the country. Some strippers, including Stormy Daniels, a spokesperson for the chain Deja Vu, argued that a change in employment status would hurt dancers, but the Boston Globe praised the litigation in an editorial, writing “Attorney Shannon Liss-Riordan, a labor law specialist, can now add strippers to the list of skycaps, baristas, wait staff, and other workers who sought her counsel and received justice.” In 2010, Liss-Riordan sued Upper Crust, a Boston-area pizza chain, for demanding that its Brazilian workers repay sums that their employer was ordered to pay them following an overtime investigation by the U.S. Department of Labor. That case led to the certification of a class action and ultimately the company filed for bankruptcy. Liss-Riordan then purchased the Harvard Square location of Upper Crust at the bankruptcy auction with her husband. They renamed the shop "The Just Crust," which they ran as a worker-friendly pizza shop for several years. Senator Elizabeth Warren attended the grand opening.

Beginning in 2013, Liss-Riordan filed suits against a number of tech companies in the "gig economy", including Lyft, Uber and Amazon. Other suits were filed against GrubHub, Doordash, Square, Inc., Caviar, PostMates, Shyp, Washio, Handy, Homejoy, and InstaCart. These cases involved the question of whether the companies improperly classified their workers as independent contractors. Liss-Riordan is best known for leading a class action case on behalf of Massachusetts and California drivers against ride-sharing company Uber, filed in 2013 and known as O'Connor v. Uber. The case argued that Uber drivers were misclassified as independent contractors, which she said allowed the company to "save massively by shifting many costs of running a business to the workers, profiting off the backs of their workers” Because of that case and similar ones she litigated against other gig companies, in 2015 the Wall Street Journal called her "one of the most influential—and controversial—figures in Silicon Valley." Politico included her in 2016 on the "Politico 50" which is list of the people who are "transforming American politics." In 2016 San Francisco Magazine said that “Liss-Riordan has achieved a kind of celebrity unseen in the legal world since Ralph Nader sued General Motors.”

In 2016, Liss-Riordan advocated for a controversial settlement against Uber estimated at totaling up to $100 million. Nine different competing attorneys representing drivers argued against the deal, and about thirty drivers out of 385,000 filed objections to the settlement or sought to remove Liss-Riordan as the leader of the class action lawsuits. Liss-Riordan defended the settlement based on the risks that the case may not win before a jury and that the appeals court could overturn the class action certification she had won for the drivers at the district court, based on her defeating Uber's arbitration clause. She also requested to reduce her firm's fee by $10 million in a bid to save the settlement. The court nevertheless rejected the settlement and, several months later, as Liss-Riordan had warned, the appeals court reversed her victory. In 2019, she reached a final settlement for $20 million covering a much smaller class. She defended her choice to settle the case in order to get money back for drivers, after some drivers were dissatisfied with still being classified as independent contractors.

After gig companies in 2020 passed “Proposition 22”, a California ballot initiative for which they spent $200 million to declare gig workers to be independent contractors, Liss-Riordan co-founded "Massachusetts is Not For Sale", an organization that opposed Uber and Lyft's push to enact a similar measure in Massachusetts. In 2022, Liss-Riordan was part of the effort that succeeded at the Supreme Judicial Court in blocking the measure from appearing on the Massachusetts ballot.

In 2018, Liss-Riordan brought an age discrimination class action against IBM, alleging that the company was working to "build a younger workforce" by laying off thousands of older workers. Through the litigation, Liss-Riordan uncovered documents showing top executives referring to older workers as “dino-babies” and plotting how to make them an “extinct species,” which were reported in The New York Times.

In 2022, Liss-Riordan started representing former Twitter employees in a class action lawsuit against Twitter for violation of the Federal and California Warn Act after Elon Musk purchased the platform. Vanity Fair spotlighted the range of Liss-Riordan's efforts against Musk specifically, which included suing America PAC.

== Political career ==
=== 2020 U.S. Senate campaign ===
On May 20, 2019, Liss-Riordan announced that she was running for the United States Senate for Massachusetts as a Democrat in the 2020 election. She told journalist Jim Braude that she was inspired by Representative Ayanna Pressley's win against an incumbent congressman. Liss-Riordan reported raising $1.1 million by the Federal Election Commission deadline on June 30, 2019, which included a $1 million personal loan from Liss-Riordan and $145,481 in individual contributions. On January 17, 2020, she withdrew from the race.

=== 2022 Attorney General campaign ===
In 2021, it was reported that Liss-Riordan was considering a candidacy for Massachusetts Attorney General. On January 25, five days after incumbent Maura Healey announced that she would vacate the seat in order to run for governor, Liss-Riordan launched her campaign for attorney general. She was endorsed by the Massachusetts AFL-CIO, in addition to more than 50 other unions, including the Massachusetts Teachers Association, the Massachusetts Nurses Association, and the Professional Fire Fighters of Massachusetts. She was also endorsed by over 80 elected officials, including US Senator for Massachusetts Elizabeth Warren and Boston Mayor Michelle Wu. Liss-Riordan lost in the primary to candidate Andrea Campbell.
