= John V. Fernandes =

American state legislator

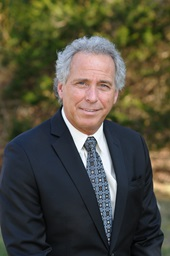
- Official portrait

Member of the Massachusetts House of Representatives from the 10th Worcester district
- In office January 3, 2007 – January 4, 2017
- Preceded by: Marie Parente
- Succeeded by: Brian Murray

Personal details
- Born: John Victor Fernandes; November 16, 1952 (age 73) Milford, Massachusetts
- Party: Democratic
- Spouse: Jennifer DiMola
- Education: University of Massachusetts Amherst (BA); Suffolk University (JD)

John Victor Fernandes (born November 16, 1952) is an American state legislator who served in the Massachusetts House of Representatives. He is a Milford resident and a member of the Democratic Party.
