= Massachusetts House of Representatives' 14th Worcester district =

American legislative district

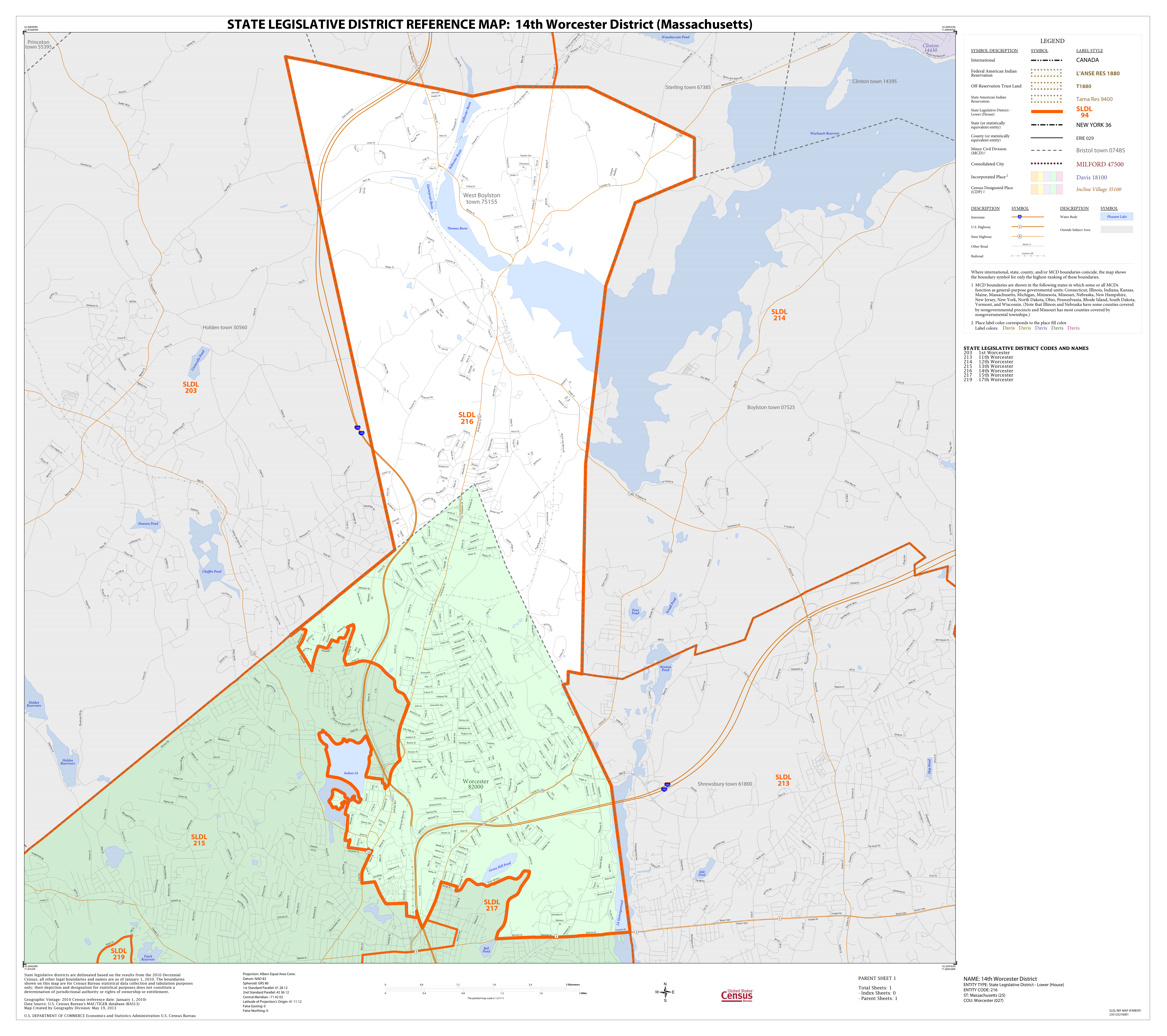
Map of Massachusetts House of Representatives' 14th Worcester district, based on the 2010 United States census.

Massachusetts House of Representatives' 14th Worcester district in the United States is one of 160 legislative districts included in the lower house of the Massachusetts General Court. It covers part of Worcester County. Democrat Jim O'Day of West Boylston has represented the district since 2007.

== Locales represented ==
The district includes the following localities:

- West Boylston
- part of the city of Worcester

The current district geographic boundary overlaps with that of the Massachusetts Senate's 1st Worcester district.

=== Former locales ===
The district previously covered:

- Northbridge, circa 1872
- Upton, circa 1872

== Representatives ==
- James E. Cheney, circa 1858
- Ralph E. Bigelow, circa 1859
- Jonathan C. Taylor, 1867
- Morrill A. Greenwood, circa 1888
- Albert T. Wall, circa 1920
- Gerald P. Lombard, circa 1951-1975
- James B. Leary
- James J. O'Day, 2007-current

== See also ==
- List of Massachusetts House of Representatives elections
- Other Worcester County districts of the Massachusetts House of Representatives: 1st, 2nd, 3rd, 4th, 5th, 6th, 7th, 8th, 9th, 10th, 11th, 12th, 13th, 15th, 16th, 17th, 18th
- Worcester County districts of the Massachusett Senate: 1st, 2nd; Hampshire, Franklin and Worcester; Middlesex and Worcester; Worcester, Hampden, Hampshire and Middlesex; Worcester and Middlesex; Worcester and Norfolk
- List of Massachusetts General Courts
- List of former districts of the Massachusetts House of Representatives

== Images ==
Portraits of legislators

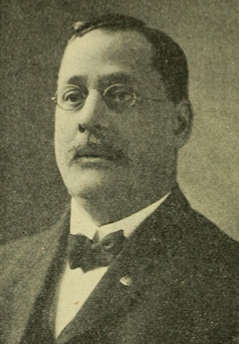
Alonzo Hoyle

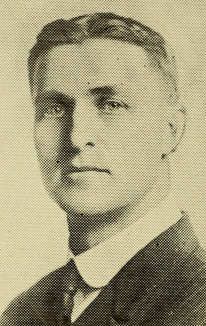
Albert Wall

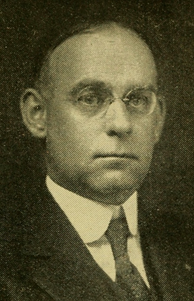
Edward Brastow Moor

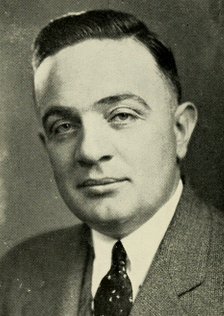
Edward Kelley

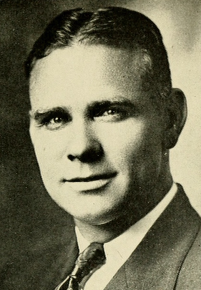
James Violette

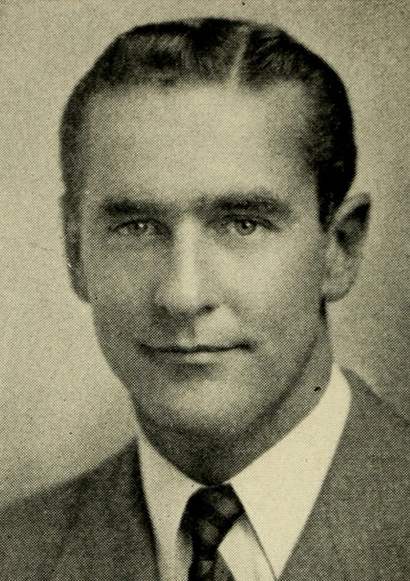
Gerald Lombard

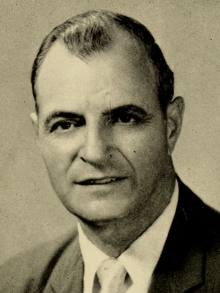
Peter Levanti

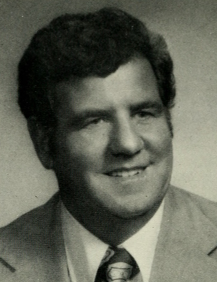
Robert Joseph Bohigian

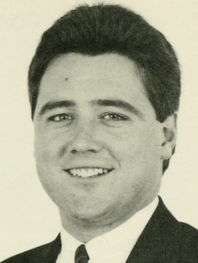
William McManus

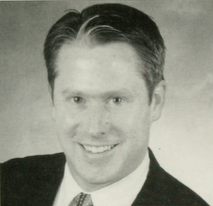
James Leary

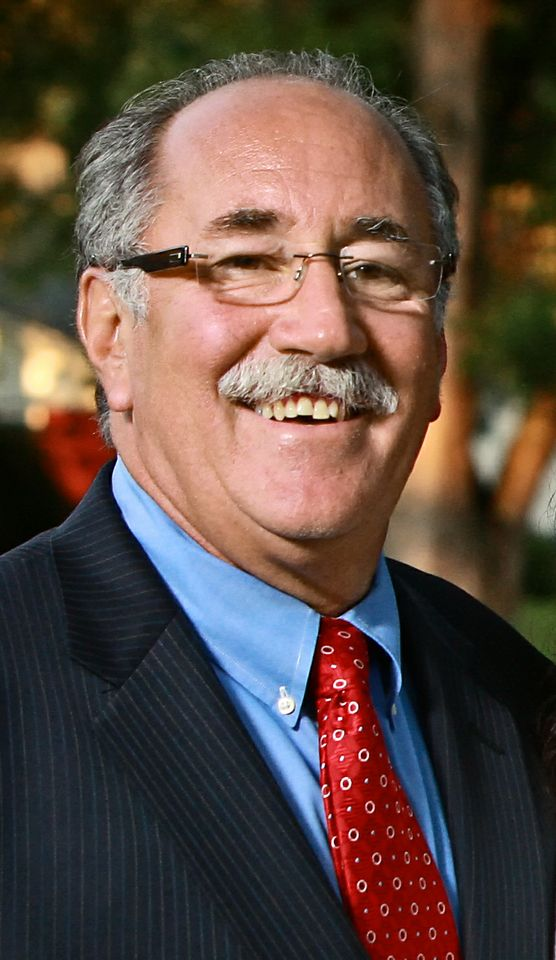
James O'Day
