= Marie Parente =

American politician (1928–2019)

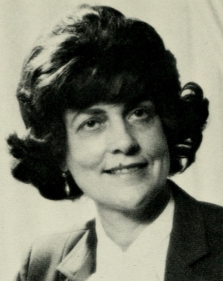
- Official portrait, circa 1983

Member of the Massachusetts House of Representatives from the 10th Worcester district
- In office January 7, 1981 – January 3, 2007
- Preceded by: Salvatore Cimino
- Succeeded by: John V. Fernandes

Personal details
- Born: Marie Josephine Longhi; May 22, 1928 Springfield, Massachusetts
- Died: September 20, 2019 (aged 91) Milford, Massachusetts
- Party: Democratic; Independent (1980)
- Spouse: Francis Anthony Parente
- Education: University of Massachusetts Boston (BS, MS)

Marie Josephine Parente (May 22, 1928 – September 20, 2019) was an American politician who served in the Massachusetts House of Representatives from 1981 to 2007. A member of the Democratic Party, she ran for reelection in 2006 but lost renomination to primary challenger John V. Fernandes.

Parente died of natural causes on September 20, 2019.
