= Massachusetts House of Representatives' 18th Worcester district =

American legislative district

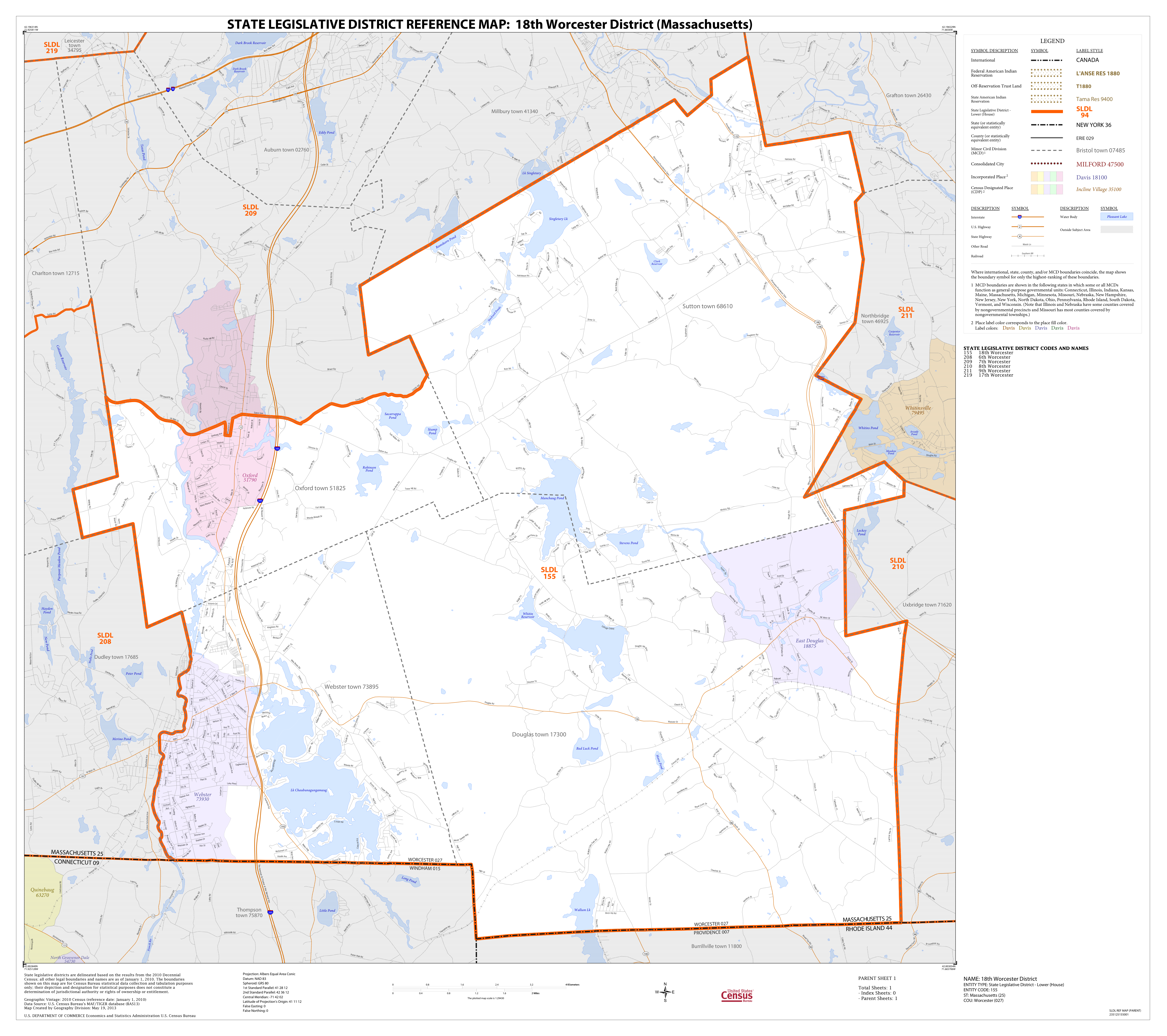
Map of Massachusetts House of Representatives' 18th Worcester district, based on the 2010 United States census.

Massachusetts House of Representatives' 18th Worcester district in the United States is one of 160 legislative districts included in the lower house of the Massachusetts General Court. It covers part of Worcester County. Republican Joseph McKenna of Webster has represented the district since 2015.

== Towns represented ==
The district includes the following localities:

- Douglas
- part of Oxford
- Sutton
- Webster

The current district geographic boundary overlaps with that of the Massachusetts Senate's Worcester and Norfolk district.

=== Former locales ===
The district previously covered:

- Brookfield, circa 1872
- North Brookfield, circa 1872
- Sturbridge, circa 1872
- Warren, circa 1872
- West Brookfield, circa 1872

== Representatives ==
- Henry D. Johnson, circa 1858
- Charles P. Whitin, circa 1859
- Peter T. Carroll, circa 1888
- Carl J. Rolander, circa 1920
- John M. Shea, circa 1951
- Richard A. Rogers, circa 1975
- Jennifer Callahan
- Ryan Fattman
- Joseph D. McKenna, 2015-current

== See also ==
- List of Massachusetts House of Representatives elections
- Other Worcester County districts of the Massachusetts House of Representatives: 1st, 2nd, 3rd, 4th, 5th, 6th, 7th, 8th, 9th, 10th, 11th, 12th, 13th, 14th, 15th, 16th, 17th
- Worcester County districts of the Massachusett Senate: 1st, 2nd; Hampshire, Franklin and Worcester; Middlesex and Worcester; Worcester, Hampden, Hampshire and Middlesex; Worcester and Middlesex; Worcester and Norfolk
- List of Massachusetts General Courts
- List of former districts of the Massachusetts House of Representatives

== Images ==
Portraits of legislators

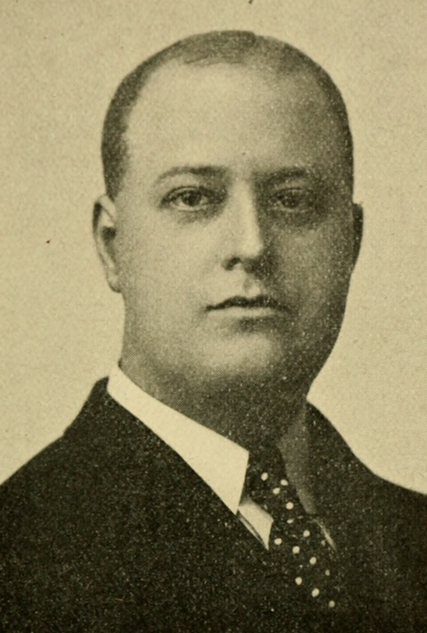
Oscar Hammarstrom

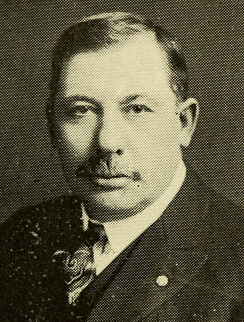
Christian Nelson

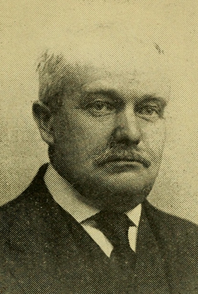
Olof Ohlson

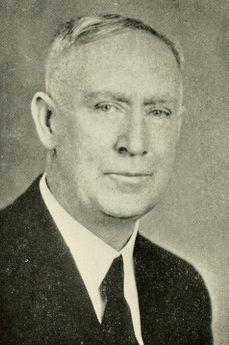
Joseph McCooey

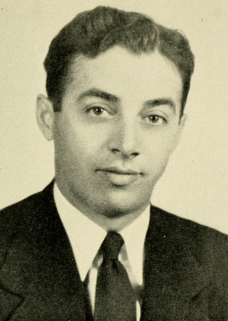
Joseph Aspero

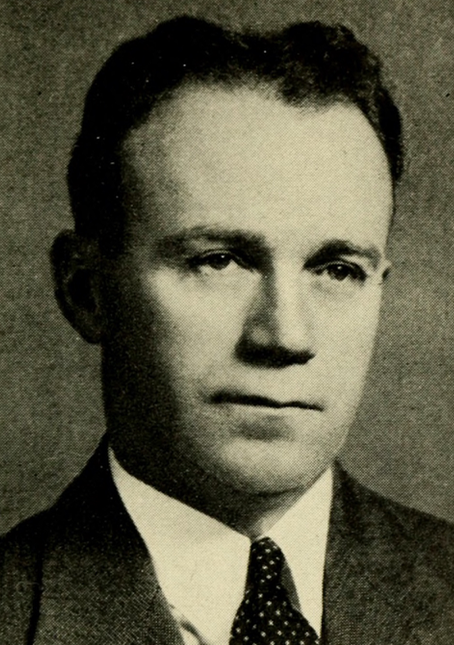
John Shea

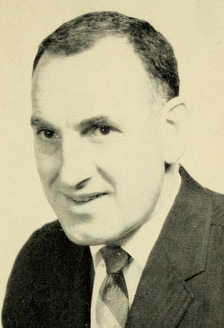
Charles Buffone

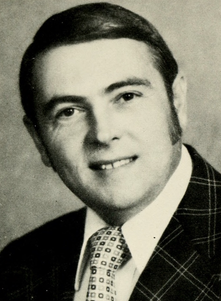
Richard Rogers

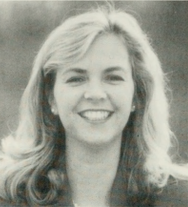
Jennifer Callahan

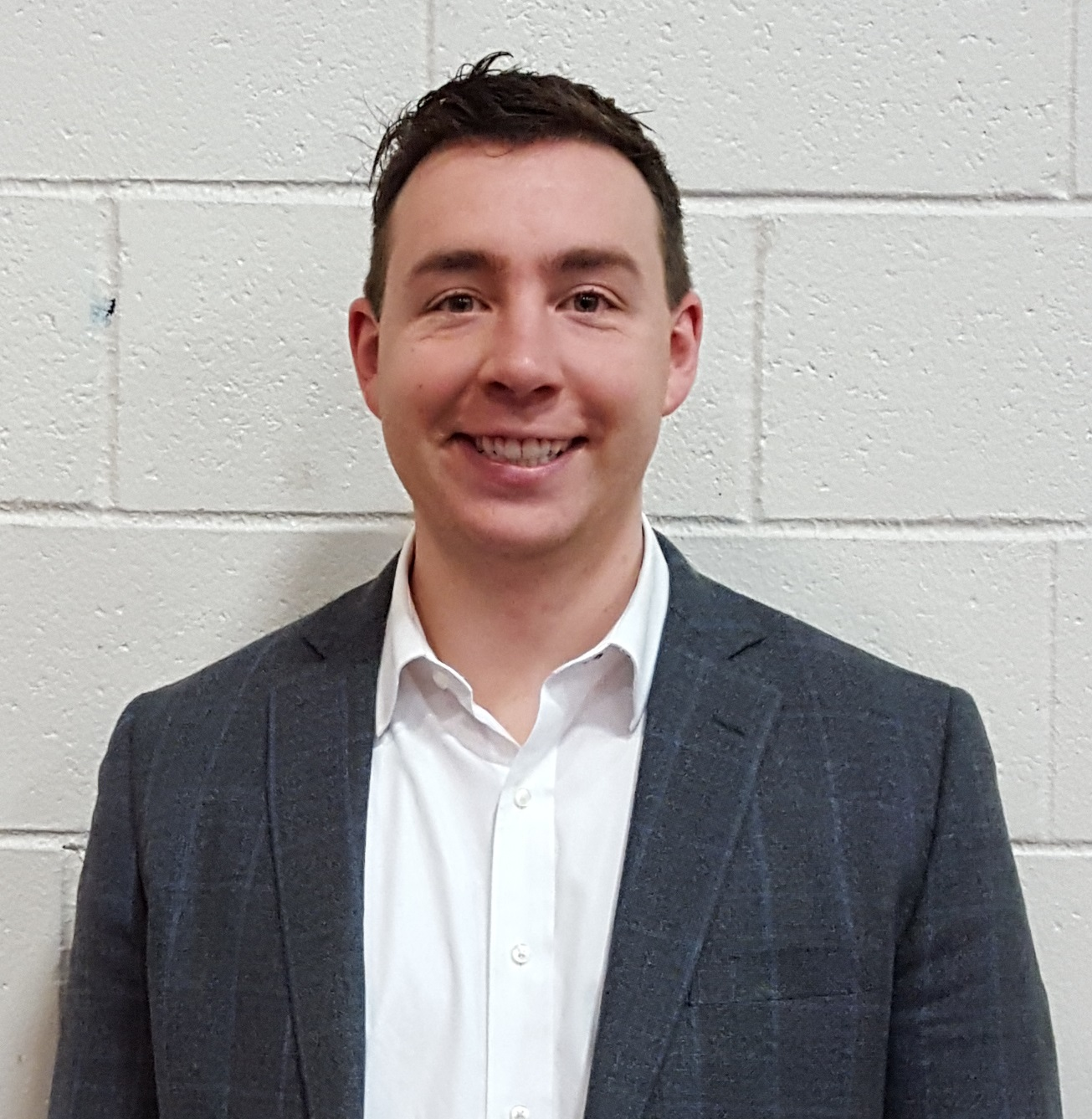
Ryan Fattman

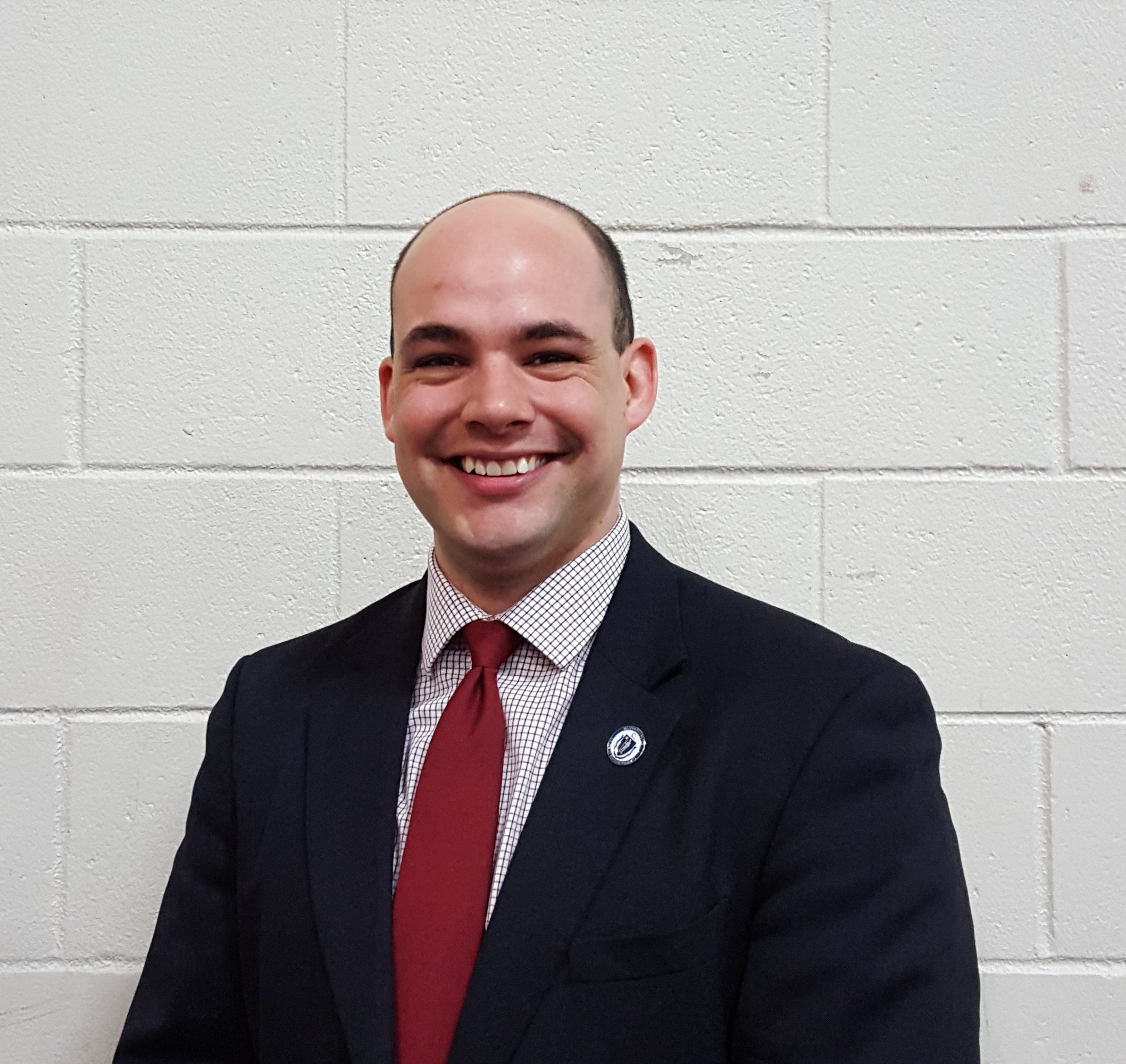
Joseph McKenna
