= John Fresolo =

American politician

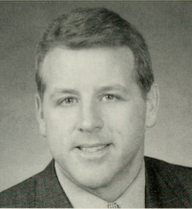
- Portrait of John Fresolo

Member of the Massachusetts House of Representatives
- Preceded by: Guy Glodis
- Succeeded by: Dan Donahue

Personal details
- Born: John Paul Fresolo; October 11, 1964 (age 61) Worcester, Massachusetts
- Education: Worcester Technical High School; Central New England College

John Paul Fresolo (born October 11, 1964) is an American politician who served in the Massachusetts House of Representatives from 1999 to 2013. He is a Worcester resident and a member of the Democratic Party.

== See also ==
- Massachusetts House of Representatives' 16th Worcester district
