= Andrea Campbell =

American politician (born 1982)

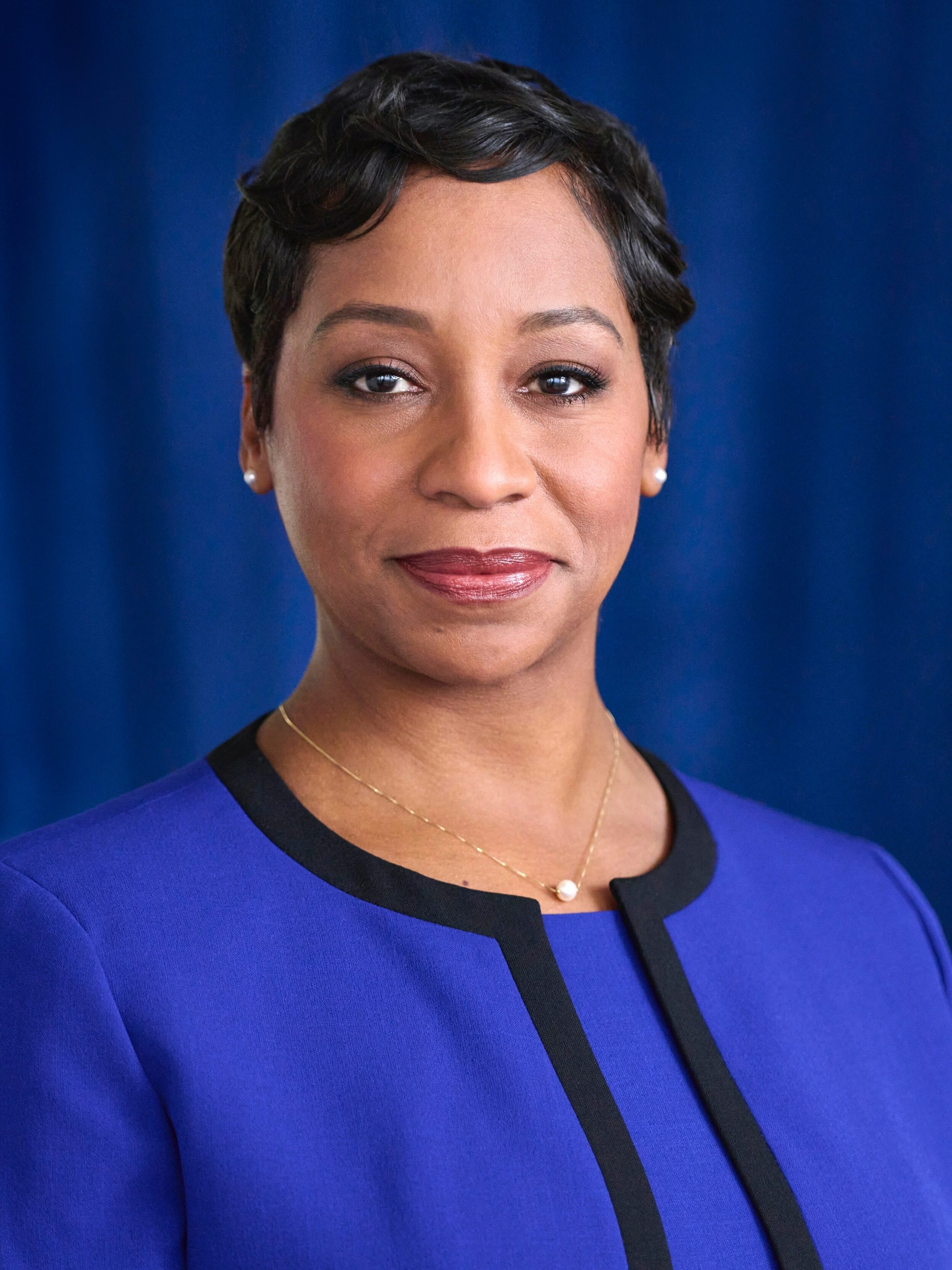
- Official portrait, 2023

45th Attorney General of Massachusetts
- Incumbent
- Assumed office January 18, 2023
- Governor: Maura Healey
- Preceded by: Maura Healey

President of the Boston City Council
- In office January 2018 – January 2020
- Preceded by: Michelle Wu
- Succeeded by: Kim Janey

Member of the Boston City Council from the 4th district
- In office January 4, 2016 – January 3, 2022
- Preceded by: Charles Yancey
- Succeeded by: Brian Worrell

Personal details
- Born: June 11, 1982 (age 44) Boston, Massachusetts, U.S.
- Party: Democratic
- Spouse: Matthew Scheier
- Children: 2
- Education: Princeton University (BA); University of California, Los Angeles (JD)
- Website: Campaign website

Andrea Joy Campbell (born June 11, 1982) is an American lawyer and politician who has served as the 45th attorney general of Massachusetts since 2023. A member of the Democratic Party, she previously served on the Boston City Council from 2016 to 2022, serving as council president from 2018 to 2020. She unsuccessfully ran for mayor of Boston in 2021, placing third in the nonpartisan primary election.

In 2022, Campbell announced her candidacy in that year's election for attorney general of Massachusetts. Campbell was the first Black woman to qualify for ballot access for statewide office in Massachusetts. Winning the Democratic Party's nomination with a sizable victory in the Democratic primary, Campbell won the general election by a large margin. In January 2023, she was sworn in as attorney general, becoming the first Black woman to hold the office and only the second Black person to hold it, preceded by Edward Brooke.

== Early life and education ==
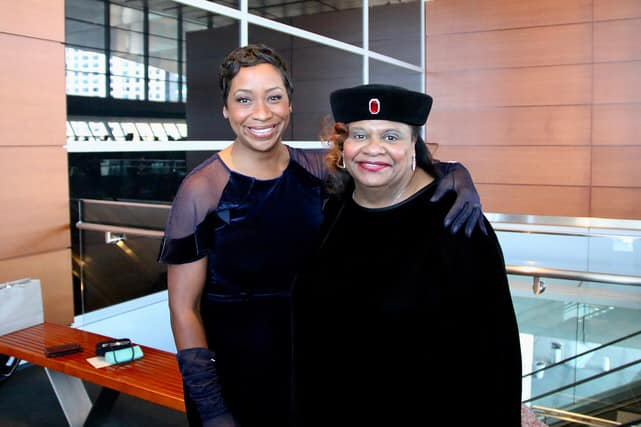
Campbell poses with Lois Savage, her aunt and mother-figure, on the day of her swearing-in as attorney general. With Campbell's birth mother deceased and her birth father imprisoned for much of her childhood, Savage and her husband played a major role in Campbell's upbringing.

Campbell and her twin brother, Andre, were born in Boston, Massachusetts. She has an older brother named Alvin Jr. Soon after she was born, her birth father, Alvin Campbell Sr., was sentenced to an eight-year prison term. When Campbell was only eight months old, her birth mother, Denise, was killed in a car accident while driving to visit Campbell's birth father in prison. As a result, Campbell and her brothers resided in foster care and with various relatives. Among the relatives Campbell lived with were her grandmother, an alcoholic, as well as her aunt and uncle Lois and Ron Savage. The Savages played a major role in her upbringing, and Campbell refers to them as being her parents. Campbell did not know her birth father until she was eight, at which time he was released from prison and she and her siblings began living with him.

Campbell was raised in the Roxbury and South End neighborhoods of Boston in a majority Black area. Over the course of her youth, she attended five different schools within the Boston Public Schools system. Shell graduated from Boston Latin School. By the time she was a high school student, both of her brothers had served prison sentences.

Campbell attended Princeton University for college. While she was 19 years of age and attending Princeton, her birth father died, leaving her an orphan. Campbell graduated from Princeton in 2004. When Campbell was 29, her twin brother, who suffered from scleroderma, died while in state custody awaiting trial. Campbell has said that the cause of her brother's death is not known to her. Following her graduation from Princeton, Campbell enrolled at the UCLA School of Law, where she received her J.D. degree.

== Early career ==
After graduating from UCLA School of Law, Campbell began her legal career by spending a year working as a staff attorney at EdLaw, a nonprofit in Roxbury that provided students and parents with free legal services pertaining to education rights and access to education. After this, Campbell spent two years at the Proskauer Rose legal firm where she provided advice to companies located in Boston and New York City on matters related to employment law and labor relations.

Campbell spent three months working as the interim general counsel for Boston's Metropolitan Area Planning Council. She later worked as deputy legal counsel to Governor Deval Patrick.

== Boston City Council ==
=== First term (2016 and 2017) ===
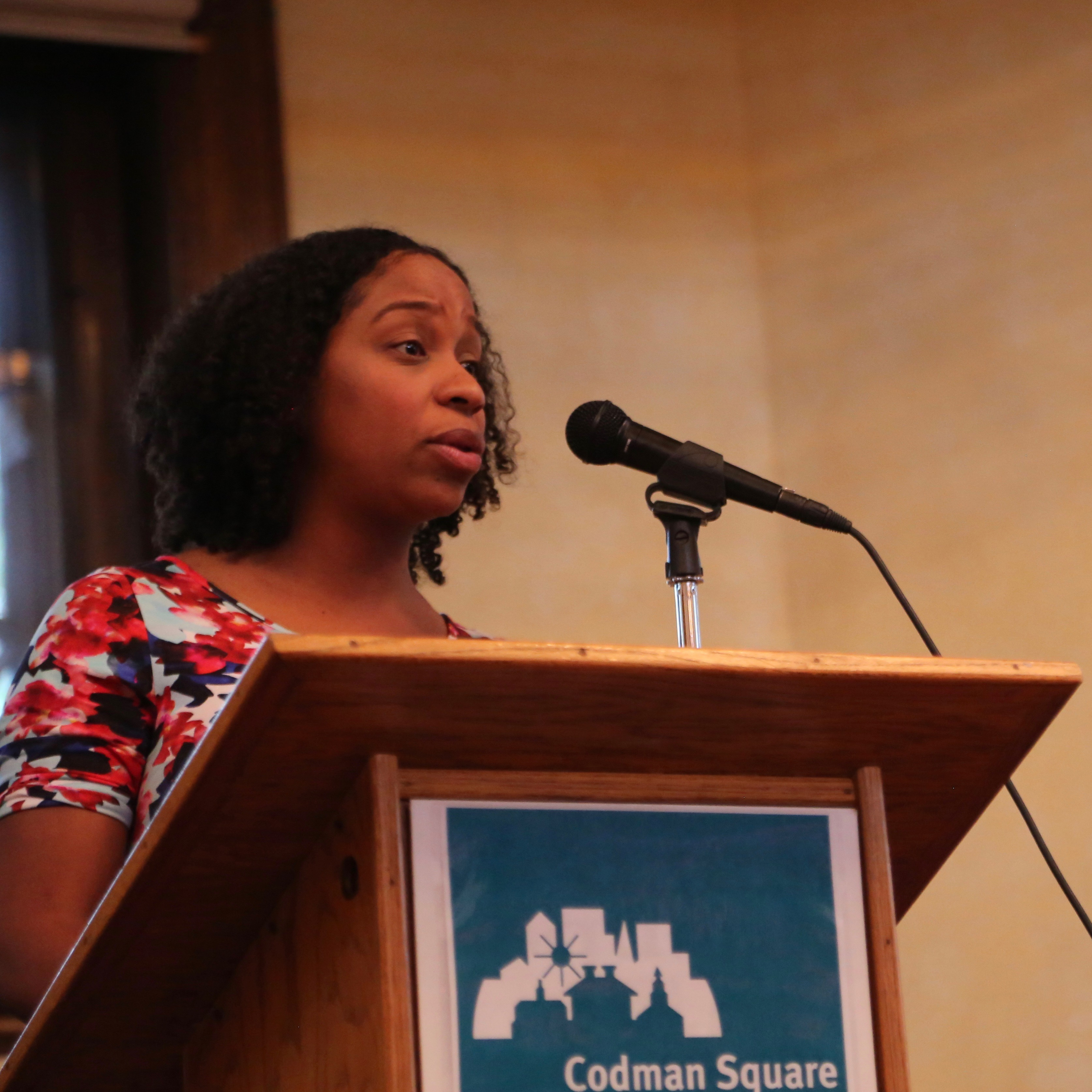
Campbell speaking in 2017

In the 2015 Boston City Council election, first-time candidate Campbell placed first in the 4th district's preliminary election and went on to defeat sixteen-term incumbent Charles Yancey in the general election with 61% of the vote. Campbell was the first woman to represent her council district.

Campbell was a supporter of voting "yes" on the Massachusetts Charter School Expansion Initiative referendum in 2016, a ballot measure which would have authorized an expansion of the number of charter schools in the state. Campbell was one of only two city councilors to vote against a resolution to voice the City Council's opposition to the ballot measure. The resolution overwhelmingly passed the council 11–2. Campbell faced criticisms from teachers' unions and progressive activists for supporting charter schools. The referendum wound up being heavily defeated by voters.

In 2016 Campbell and Councilor Ayanna Pressley introduced an ordinance that would have banned the use of credit scores by employers to negatively assess job applicants and existing hires.

Campbell supported the proposed federal Second Chance Reauthorization Act of 2015, which would have reauthorized the 2007 Second Chance Act. She introduced an ordinance to the Boston City Council to express support for this.

=== Second term and council presidency (2018 and 2019) ===
Campbell was reelected in November 2017, having run unopposed. Campbell was one of two members of the Boston City Council not to give an endorsement in the coinciding 2017 Boston mayoral election. Besides Campbell, Ayanna Pressley remained neutral (citing her husband's employment by Mayor Walsh). Tito Jackson was running against Walsh, and the other ten city councilors endorsed Walsh's reelection campaign.

On December 9, 2017, Campbell announced that she had unanimous support of her colleagues to be the next president of the council. She was elected council president on January 1, 2018. Campbell was the first African-American woman to hold the position.

In 2019, as City Council president, Campbell proposed an ordinance to create a city inspector general. Mayor Marty Walsh came out in opposition to it. The ordinance was rejected by the City Council in a 9–4 vote. Also in 2019, Campbell and fellow councilor Matt O'Malley proposed the idea of a vacancy tax on abandoned residential and commercial properties.

Campbell promoted the idea of extending City Council terms from two years to four years in duration. She argued that longer terms would strengthen the City Council's power in city government and make it a more effective body. Such a proposal would require a home-rule petition to garner state consent. In February 2019, during hearings on this, Campbell proposed making further changes to city election laws, including creating a prohibition from running for more than one municipal office at the same time and changing the law so that special elections would be held to fill vacant at-large seats rather than the seat being offered to the first runner-up of the previous at-large election. This latter proposal notably came at a moment when Althea Garrison had just joined the Boston City Council to fill the at-large seat left vacant by Ayanna Pressley (who had resigned to join the U.S. House of Representatives) because Garrison had been the first runner-up in the 2017 at-large Boston City Council election. Campbell denied that her proposal was in response to Garrison, instead claiming it came from a belief that giving a seat to someone who had not outright won election to it is undemocratic. Campbell, ultimately, did not combine these ideas into a single petition. She separated them into two different petitions. One petition, which passed the City Council 11–2, requested that the state allow the city to extend Boston City Council term limits to four years. Campbell introduced a separate petition to hold special elections to fill vacant at-large seats.

After the chaotic right-wing "Straight Pride Parade" event held in Boston in 2019, Campbell called on the city to reassess its approval process for public event permits. Campbell was critical of the event and the public resources that went to providing crowd control and security around it, writing, "while I am a firm believer in free speech, I’m not okay with wasting tens of thousands of taxpayer dollars for a group to come into Boston from out of state to create chaos and spread hate."

Campbell endorsed Kamala Harris's campaign in the 2020 Democratic Party presidential primaries.

In April 2018, during her City Council presidency, Boston magazine ranked Campbell 51st on its list of the "100 Most Influential People in Boston". The magazine wrote that political insiders anticipated a continued political ascent for Campbell. She was one of only three city councilors included in these rankings, joined by Ayanna Pressley (ranked 20th after having won an upset primary election victory that made her poised to be elected to the U.S. House of Representatives) and Michelle Wu (ranked 31st). At the end of Campbell's council presidency, Milton J. Valencia of The Boston Globe opined that during both Campbell's City Council presidency and the preceding tenure Michelle Wu as City Council president, the council had, "been, perhaps, the most aggressive in recent history in pushing reforms, often to the left of the mayor, on issues addressing climate change and economic and racial equity."

=== Third term (2020 and 2021) ===
Campbell won reelection to the council in November 2019. She was succeeded as president by Kim Janey in January 2020.

In June 2020, Campbell was one of the five city councilors in the minority that voted against Mayor Walsh's $3.61 billion operating budget proposal. She argued that it failed to include changes necessary for the city to address its racial inequality and systemic racism. That month, when Walsh announced the creation of a philanthropic fund focused on racial inequities, Campbell was somewhat critical. While she supported the creation of the fund itself and acknowledged that she believed philanthropy could play an important role, she argued that it was more important for the city to focus its own budget on such problems. Campbell was also critical of Walsh's coinciding move to create a new cabinet position within his administration dedicated to equity and inclusion, considering it a "duplicative position" and criticizing Walsh for not instead implementing other "actionable ideas" to "transform inequitable systems" that had been proposed to Walsh by her and others.

In July 2020, amid the George Floyd protests, Campbell proposed an ordinance to create a police oversight board. Ultimately, the Boston City Council voted later that year to approve a different ordinance creating an Office of Police Accountability that features a civilian police review board and oversight panel for internal affairs, which Mayor Walsh signed into law.

In 2021, Campbell and fellow councilor Kim Janey proposed an ordinance that would have banned almost all employers in Boston from running credit checks on job seekers, arguing that credit checks are most detrimental to low-income applicants.

In April 2021, in her capacity as chair of the public safety committee, Campbell refused to push forward $1.2 million in proposed grants for the Boston Police Department. Amid this, she engaged in a social media conflict with the account of the Boston Police Patrolmen's Association, which had issued criticism of Campbell. Campbell contrasted the union's vocal criticism of her with the union's failure to comment on the former child abuse allegations made against a past president of the police union.

In May 2021, the City Council passed an ordinance by Campbell and Ricardo Arroyo which limits the use of crowd control weapons by officers of the Boston Police Department. Acting Mayor Kim Janey signed the ordinance into law. Another such ordinance authored by Campbell and Arroyo had previously been passed by the City Council in December 2020, but had been vetoed by Mayor Marty Walsh in January 2021.

Campbell voiced opposition to the police department's use of exams which she contended were "biased" in order to weigh promotions of officers. She criticized Acting Mayor Janey for her initial defense of such exams. After Janey changed her position, Campbell criticized her for being late to address the matter.

As of January 2020, Campbell served on several council committees, including Community Preservation Act, Public Safety & Criminal Justice, Rules and Administration, and Whole.

Campbell did not run for reelection to the council in 2021, as she instead opted to run for mayor.

== 2021 mayoral campaign ==
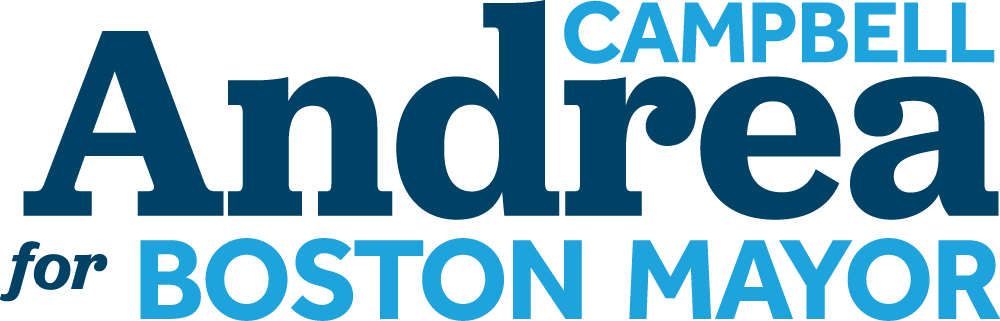
Mayoral campaign logo

On September 24, 2020, Campbell announced her candidacy in the 2021 Boston mayoral election from her childhood home in Roxbury. In an announcement video that was released, she declared, "I'm running for mayor, because every neighborhood deserves real change and a real chance." Campbell's mayoral campaign launch followed the launch of her council colleague Michelle Wu's own campaign for mayor earlier that month.

During her campaign, Campbell was critical of Acting Mayor Kim Janey, who was also a candidate in the election. Campbell worked to illustrate a strong contrast between herself and Janey. Campbell held press conferences criticizing Janey on various topics, including urging her to release legal documents related to a police scandal and to make greater cuts to the city's police department budget. In early August, Campbell called for Janey to put in place rules which would require that many businesses require patrons provide proof of vaccination. Campbell also criticized Janey for having, per her criticism, waited too long to put in place a vaccine mandate for city employees.

Campbell received the endorsement of The Boston Globe's editorial board.

Campbell's campaign platform included a proposal to reallocate ten percent of the Boston Police Department's budget ($50 million) to other programs matters related to public health, economic justice, and youth issues. She also proposed removing the Boston Public Schools' 125 school resource officers and reutilizing those funds to pay for more mental health specialists.

Ahead of the primary election, a super PAC associated with UNITE HERE Local 26, supporting Kim Janey's candidacy, ran a negative radio advertisement against Campbell which attacked her past support for charter school expansion, and which alleged that Campbell was "supported by special interests that want to take money from our schools, and give it to other schools that discriminate against kids with special needs". The latter accusation was seen as alluding to the fact that a super PAC supporting Campbell's candidacy received funding from wealthy charter school proponents, such as Reed Hastings. Campbell publicly took issue with the characterization of her in this ad, and urged Janey to disavow it, which Janey did not. Janey's campaign manager accused Campbell of being a hypocrite, characterizing Campbell's campaign as being entirely, "based on negative political attacks on Mayor Janey".

Campbell delivered a concession speech on the night of the nonpartisan mayoral primary, despite extremely little of the vote having yet been officially reported. Once the votes were fully reported, Campbell had finished third in the primary, meaning that she did not advance to the general election.

Following her loss, Campbell stated that she would have a publicly transparent process in contemplating which general election candidate (Annissa Essaibi George or Michelle Wu) to endorse, if any. She stated that she would seek firm commitments to the Black community to be made by any candidate she might endorsed. She ultimately gave no endorsement to either remaining candidate.

== Attorney general of Massachusetts ==
=== 2022 election ===
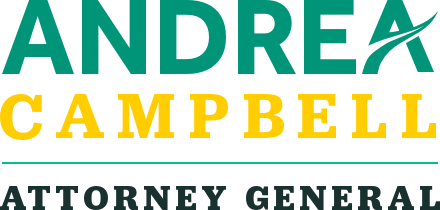
Logo for Campbell's 2022 attorney general campaign

On February 2, 2022, Campbell announced her candidacy for Massachusetts attorney general in the 2022 election. Campbell's announcement came after incumbent attorney general Maura Healey announced that she would not seek reelection and run for governor of Massachusetts instead.

Campbell's inclusion on the ballot for the election's Democratic primary made her the first Black woman in the history of Massachusetts to qualify for inclusion on the ballot for election to statewide office. Healey endorsed Campbell in August, prior to the primary election. Campbell won the Democratic nomination and, in the general election, was elected to serve as attorney general. She is the first Black woman to hold the office, and the second Black person to hold the office, after only Edward Brooke. Other focuses of her platform included addressing public safety as well as housing-related matters.

As a candidate, Campbell pledged to approach the position through what she dubbed an "equity lens". She pledged that she would use the office to address matters such as disparities of health and economics negatively impacting the rural parts of the state prison reform, and juvenile justice. She promised that she would seek to ensure that nobody would be treated as "above the law". She also promised to revive public faith in the criminal justice system. Campbell made criminal justice reform a focus of her candidacy. Campbell also made addressing police misconduct one of the focuses of her campaign. Among the positions she staked out was a promise to end the practice of qualified immunity. Campbell's Republican opponent, Jay McMahon, attempted to paint her as being "soft" on crime. After the Dobbs v. Jackson decision by the United States Supreme Court overturned the federal protections of abortion rights that had been previously protected by the Roe v. Wade decision, Campbell pledged that as attorney general she would establish a reproductive justice unit under the Office of the Attorney General.

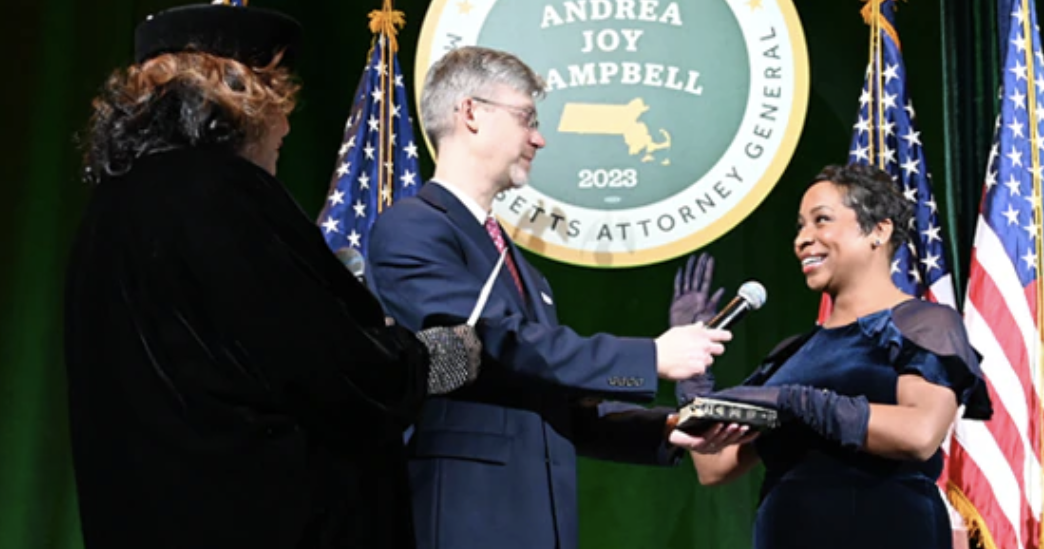
Campbell (far right) taking her oath of office as attorney general

Campbell won the November general election 62.6% to 37.4%. In early December, Campbell announced that she had established a committee to facilitate her end of the Attorney General's Office's transition of leadership. Campbell took office on January 18, 2023. Her swearing-in ceremony took place at the Boston Convention and Exhibition Center. Campbell has said that she views primary role for the office of attorney general as being to serve as the "people's lawyer". Campbell's husband, Matthew Scheier, held the Bible upon which she took her oath. Her aunt, Lois Savage (who Campbell regards as a mother figure), administered the oath.

=== Establishment of new units within office ===
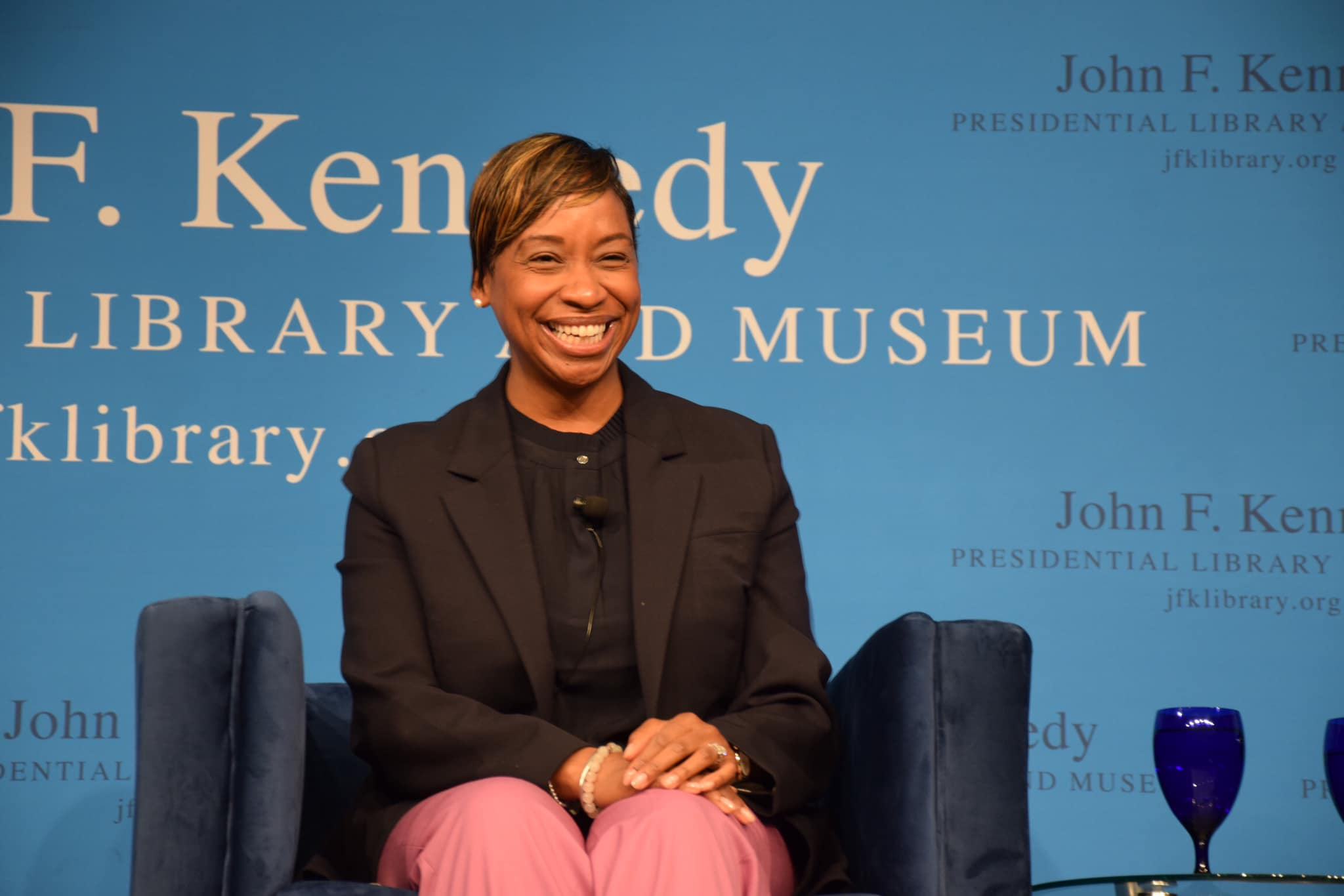
Campbell at the John F. Kennedy Presidential Library in 2023

On April 4, 2023, Campbell spoke to the state legislature to request that the state's upcoming budget fund the creation of four new departments under the Office of the Attorney General: a Reproductive Justice Unit, an Elder Justice Unit, a Gun Violence Prevention Unit and a Police Accountability Unit. The creation of a reproductive health unit had been a campaign promise of hers. By the start of 2024, Campbell had established the first three units, and was pledging to establish the latter. In March 2024, Campbell further proposed creating a unit dedicated to housing affordability.

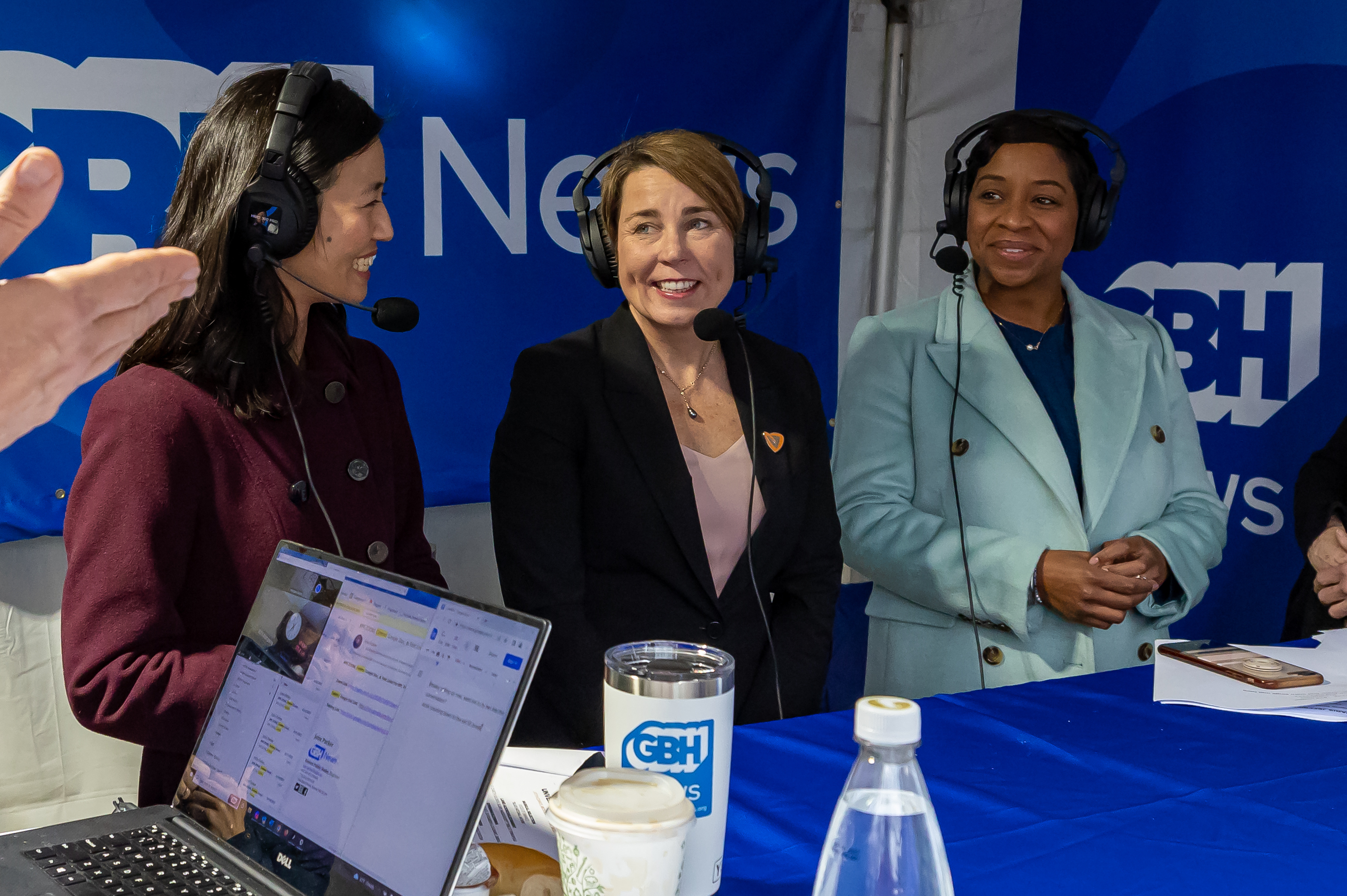
Campbell (far right) in 2023 with Boston Mayor Michelle Wu and Massachusetts Governor Maura Healey

=== MBTA Communities Zoning Law lawsuit against Milton ===
In March 2023, Campbell threatened legal action against Massachusetts Bay Transportation Authority municipalities that were not adhering to the transit-oriented housing policy of the MBTA Communities Zoning Law. The law, adopted in 2021, requires all municipalities within the service area of the MBTA transit agency to have at least one zoning district permitting multi-family housing by right.

In February 2024, Campbell filed a lawsuit against the town of Milton seeking to compel the town into compliance with the law. Earlier that month, the town's voters had voted in a referendum against adopting new zoning that would allow multifamily housing in the manner that the law requires. Proponents of the referendum contended that municipalities have the final authority on such zoning matters, not the state. Campbell's suit challenges this contention. The municipal government of Milton opposes Campbell's lawsuit. She has requested for the Massachusetts Supreme Judicial Court to hear the matter.

=== Other matters ===
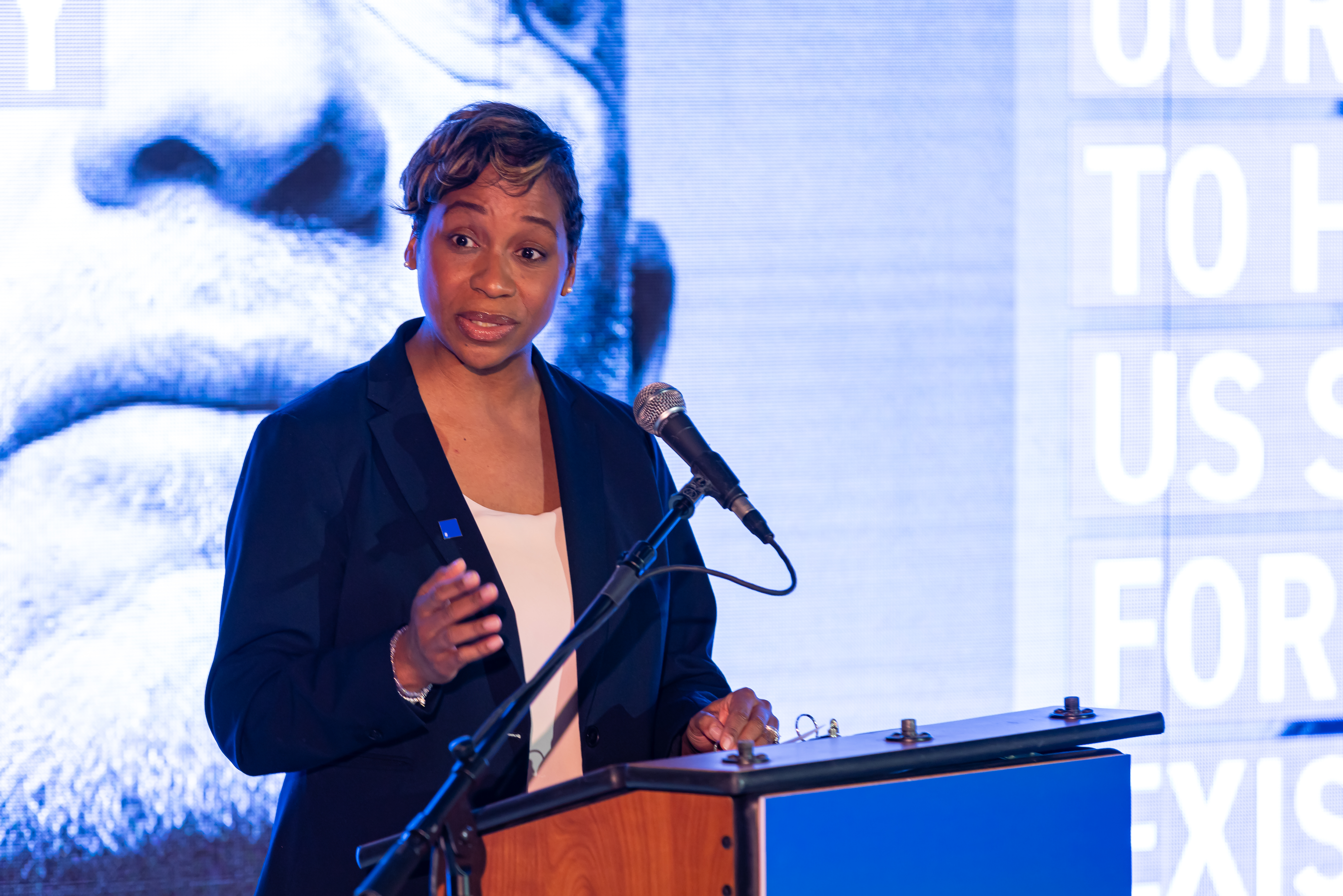
Campbell at a 2023 event advocating against antisemitism

While Campbell stands by her personal opposition to qualified immunity, within months of taking office she had backed away from her promise of ending it, viewing such a pursuit as detrimental to the working relationship her office needs to maintain with law enforcement officials.

In a June 2023 filing with the Massachusetts Department of Public Utilities, Campbell advised that it would be wiser to grant only a much smaller procurement of offshore wind power than Governor Healey had requested approval from the department to procure. Campbell argued that the a 20-year contract to procure energy should be for a smaller amount of power than Healey was proposing, arguing that it was unwise to make an agreement for larger purchase at a time when prices for offshore wind power had increased.

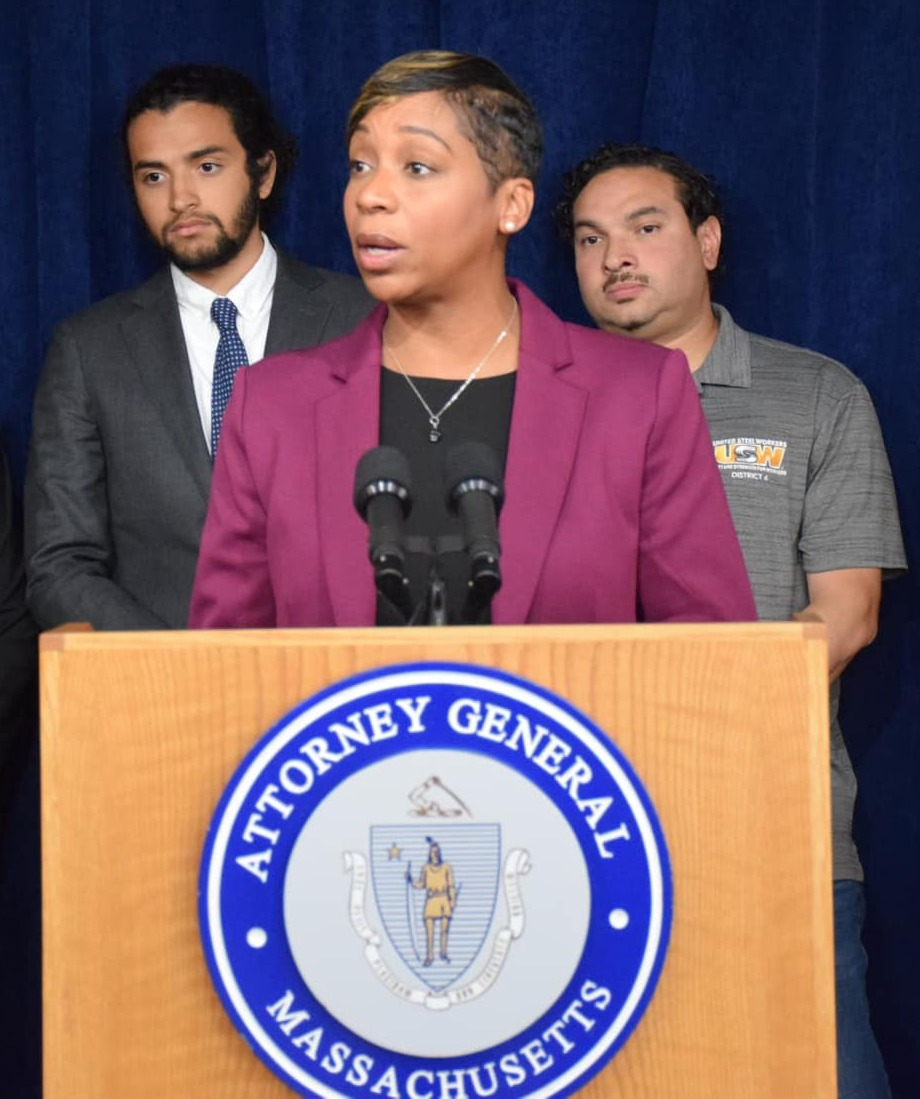
Campbell holding a press conference in 2023

In February 2024, Campbell announced that the state of Massachusetts would receive $8 million from a national $350 million multi-state national settlement with Publicis Health over that company's role in the opioid epidemic in the United States.

In May 2023, Campbell announced that the Attorney General's Office was probing allegations of racial bias within the gang unit and gang database of the Boston Police Department.

In April 2024, Campbell had the state of Massachusetts join a multi-state lawsuit seeking to reinstate protections for transgender individuals and other vulnerable populations. A Trump administration-era rule change had eliminated these protections.

In 2023, Campbell proposed regulations that would seek to prohibit junk fees.

In October 2023, months after the United States Supreme Court's Students for Fair Admissions v. Harvard decision declared race-based college admissions affirmative action programs to be unconstitutional, Campbell and Governor Healey jointly released new statewide guidelines for colleges and university's to promote campus diversity. The guidelines allow the institutions to consider life experiences that have shaped the lives of applicants, which can include race-related life experiences. This is in keeping with new federal recommendations on the matter.

In March 2024, Campbell launched The Youth Sports Betting Safety Coalition in partnership with the NCAA. The private-public partnership aims to educate youth on the potential perils of participation in sports gambling.

In November 2023, Campbell issued an opinion that State Auditor Diana DiZoglio lacked authority to audit the operations of the Massachusetts General Court (state legislature). DiZoglio had been attempting to undertake such an audit, but had faced strong opposition from state legislative leaders.

In December 2023, Campbell launched civil rights litigation against the National Socialist Club 131, a regional neo-Nazi organization. This made her the second states attorney to sue the organization, as New Hampshire Attorney General John Formella had earlier that year filed a civil rights lawsuit against the group. The suit Campbell filed alleges that the group has committed "violent" and "coercive" actions that amount to harassment and civil rights violations, including targeted disrupting of drag queen story hour events and intimidation actions towards hotels that are allowing their facilities to be used as shelters for migrants.

== Political positions ==
Campbell is regarded to be a progressive member of the Democratic Party.

=== Criminal justice ===
Campbell has expressed her belief that policing and the criminal justice system in Massachusetts are in need of reform. Campbell has supported progressive-leaning measures related to criminal justice reform.

Campbell has highlighted combatting government corruption as an important priority for her as attorney general, remarking, "No one should be above the law...When something goes wrong that is not in compliance with our law, that is in violation of the spirit of our laws and stands in the way of justice, an AG has a responsibility to stand up."

=== Abortion ===
Campbell supports access to reproductive healthcare, including abortion care. She has highlighted preserving abortion access as an important priority for her as attorney general. Her 2022 campaign for attorney general received endorsements from the abortion rights advocacy groups Planned Parenthood, EMILY's List, NARAL Pro-Choice America, and Reproductive Equity Now. EMILY's List had previously endorsed her 2019 re-election as city councilor.

Campbell has voiced her opposition to efforts to restrict access to the medical abortion medicine Mifepristone.

=== LGBTQ matters ===
Campbell supports access to gender-affirming care. She also supports the participation of transgender student athletes in sports on teams consistent with their gender identity.

=== Education ===
Campbell is a longtime support of charter schools. In 2016, she endorsed a "yes" vote on the unsuccessful Massachusetts Charter School Expansion Initiative referendum.

=== Drug policy ===
As a candidate for mayor, Campbell was supportive of safe consumption sites for illegal drugs as a tool for addressing drug addiction in the city and encouraging recovery. These would be similar to supervised injection sites. When she ran for attorney general the following year, she opposed safe consumption sites from the standpoint of state-level policy.

=== Diversity and equity policies ===
Campbell criticizing the 2023 U.S. Supreme Court ruling in Students for Fair Admissions v. Harvard

Campbell criticized the 2023 U.S. Supreme Court ruling in Students for Fair Admissions v. Harvard, which found race-based affirmative action in college admissions to be unconstitutional. Saying that the ruling, "undermine[s] and discount[s]" the history of the United States, Campbell remarked,

Race at the outset was used to marginalize and exclude Black residents, for example, from accessing all types of benefits, some of that perpetuated by the Supreme Court itself. This history, this context is critically important because it explains the racial disparities that exist in our health care system today, in our criminal legal system today, in our housing system and our economy and so much more.

After the case, Campbell partnered with Governor Healey to create new state guidelines for colleges and university's promotion of diversity.

Campbell is supportive of private companies having their own diversity efforts.

== Personal life ==
Campbell was born in Boston. Her mother and father died when she was very young; she refers to an aunt and uncle as her parents. By the time Campbell was a high school student, both of Campbell's brothers had served prison sentences. When she was 29, her twin brother, who suffered from scleroderma, died while in state custody awaiting trial. Her other brother, Alvin, is an accused serial rapist currently awaiting trial on nine sexual assault charges. Campbell, in 2022, stated that she had not visited her brother Alvin since he was arrested, remarking, "I view my older brother's charges and what is happening there as just another brother lost, which is sad and tragic for me. So now I have two brothers who are lost."

Campbell has often discussed traumas such as the death of her mother, childhood absence of her father, and her experience in foster care, as well as her twin brother's life story. Campbell once remarked to a reporter from The Associated Press,

One thing I do frequently is share my story because I think there are so many who carry their story with a sense of shame and don’t want to talk about it, including the criminal aspects of my family. But there is no shame in one sharing their story. There is power in it.

Campbell has credited family members, teachers, and employers with helping her to find a path to success. Throughout her political career, she has cited her family's experience with inequity and the criminal justice system, particularly her twin brother's life experience, as impacting her views and priorities.

Campbell is married to Matthew Scheier. She and her husband have two sons. She lived in the Mattapan neighborhood of Boston. In November 2024, Campbell and her husband purchased a home in Dartmouth, Massachusetts which they intend to make their new residence.

== Electoral history ==
=== City council ===
2015 Boston City Council 4th district election
Candidate	Primary election		General election	
Candidate	Votes	%	Votes	%
Andrea Campbell	1,982	57.92	4,311	61.32
Charles Yancey (incumbent)	1,159	33.87	2,701	38.42
Terrance J. Williams	217	6.34		
Jovan J. Lacet	60	1.75		
all others	4†	0.12	18†	0.26
Total	3,422	100	7,030	100

† write-in votes

2017 Boston City Council 4th district election
Candidate	Votes	%
Andrea Campbell (incumbent)	8,027	98.64
Write-ins	111	1.36
Total votes	8,138	100

2019 Boston City Council 4th district election
Candidate	Votes	%
Andrea Campbell (incumbent)	4,558	87.15
Jeff Durham	637	12.18
Write-ins	35	0.67
Total votes	5,230	100

=== Mayor ===
2021 Boston mayoral election
Candidate	Primary election		General election	
Candidate	Votes	%	Votes	%
Michelle Wu	36,060	33.40	91,794	63.96
Annissa Essaibi George	24,268	22.48	51,125	35.62
Andrea Campbell	21,299	19.73		
Kim Janey (acting incumbent)	21,047	19.49		
John Barros	3,459	3.20		
Robert Cappucci	1,185	1.10		
Jon Santiago (withdrawn)	368	0.34		
Richard Spagnuolo	286	0.26		
Scattering	0	0.00	595	0.41
Total	107,972	100	144,380	100

=== Attorney general ===
2022 Massachusetts Attorney General Democratic convention vote first round
Party	Candidate	Votes	%
Democratic	Andrea Campbell	1,622	39.2
Democratic	Quentin Palfrey	1,605	38.8
Democratic	Shannon Liss-Riordan	906	21.9
Total votes		4,133	100.0%

2022 Massachusetts Attorney General Democratic convention vote second round
Party	Candidate	Votes	%
Democratic	Quentin Palfrey	1,920	54
Democratic	Andrea Campbell	1,631	46
Total votes		3,551	100%

2022 Massachusetts Attorney General Democratic primary results
Party	Candidate	Votes	%
Democratic	Andrea Campbell	365,362	50.10%
Democratic	Shannon Liss-Riordan	248,648	34.10%
Democratic	Quentin Palfrey (withdrawn)	115,200	15.80%
Total votes		729,210	100.0%

2022 Massachusetts Attorney General election
Party	Candidate	Votes	%	±%
Democratic	Andrea Campbell	1,539,624	62.85%	−7.06%
Republican	James R. McMahon, III	908,608	37.09%	+7.07%
Write-in		1,550	0.06%	-0.01%
Total votes		2,449,782	100.0%	
Democratic hold				

== Commentaries and op-eds authored ==
- "Is Boston's Booming Economy Making Our City Better Or Destroying It? The Truth Lies Somewhere In Between", WBUR, February 13, 2020.
- "What The Pandemic Is Doing To My Boston Neighborhood", WBUR, April 24, 2020.
- "We Can't Make Sweeping Structural Change If Our Leaders Don't Understand Racial Equity", WBUR, June 4, 2020, by
- "Boston Needs to Take More Decisive Measures on COVID-19", The Boston Globe, August 19, 2021.
- "How Will Mayoral Candidates Address Inequities and Empower Black Bostonians?", The Boston Globe, September 24, 2021.
- "Massachusetts Should Ban Third-party Electric Suppliers", The Boston Globe, September 29, 2024 –co-authored with Michelle Wu

Political offices
Preceded by Michelle Wu	President of the Boston City Council; 2018–2020	Succeeded by Kim Janey
Party political offices
Preceded by Maura Healey	Democratic nominee for Attorney General of Massachusetts; 2022, 2026	Most recent
Legal offices
Preceded by Bessie Dewar; Acting	Attorney General of Massachusetts; 2023–present	Incumbent
