= Dan Donahue =

Massachusetts politician

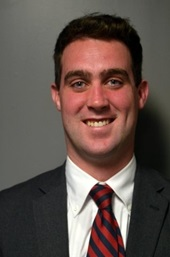

Member of the Massachusetts House of Representatives from the 16th Worcester district
- Incumbent
- Assumed office September 25, 2013
- Preceded by: John Fresolo

Personal details
- Born: May 1, 1987 (age 39)
- Party: Democratic
- Education: College of the Holy Cross (BA)

Daniel M. Donahue (born May 1, 1987) is an American politician serving in the Massachusetts House of Representatives since September 2013. He is a Worcester resident and a member of the Democratic Party. His district includes Grafton Hill, Vernon Hill, College Hill, the Massasoit Road area, Green Island, and Quinsigamond Village within Worcester.

== Electoral history ==
Massachusetts 16th Worcester State Representative General Election, 2016
Party	Candidate	Votes	%
Democratic	Dan Donahue	7,783	67.0
United Independent	John Fresolo	3,804	32.7
Write-in		32	0.3
Total votes		11,619	100.0

In 2014 Donahue went unopposed in the general election.

Massachusetts 16th Worcester State Representative Democratic Primary, 2014
Party	Candidate	Votes	%
Democratic	Dan Donahue	1,679	53.1
Democratic	Joshua Perro	1,474	46.7
Write-in		6	0.2
Total votes		3,159	100.0

Massachusetts 16th Worcester State Representative Special General Election, 2013
Party	Candidate	Votes	%
Democratic	Dan Donahue	1,614	63.6
Republican	Carol E. Claros	912	35.9
Write-in		12	0.5
Total votes		2,538	100.0

Massachusetts 16th Worcester State Representative Special Democratic Primary, 2013
Party	Candidate	Votes	%
Democratic	Dan Donahue	858	27.3
Democratic	Joshua Perro	761	24.2
Democratic	Khrystian E. King	675	21.5
Democratic	James M. O'Brien	534	17.0
Democratic	Daniele F. Nanni	286	9.1
Write-in		29	0.9
Total votes		3,143	100.0

== See also ==
- 2019–2020 Massachusetts legislature
- 2021–2022 Massachusetts legislature
