= Richard T. Moore =

American politician

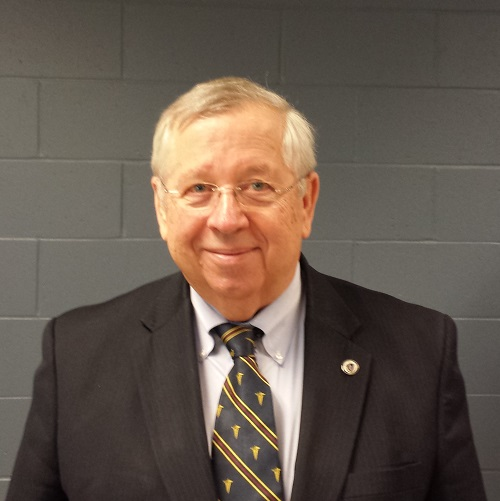
- Moore in 2014

President pro tempore of the Massachusetts State Senate
- In office 2013 – January 7, 2015

Member of the Massachusetts State Senate Worcester and Norfolk district
- In office 1996 – January 7, 2015
- Succeeded by: Ryan Fattman

President of the National Conference of State Legislatures
- In office 2010–2011
- Preceded by: Don Balfour
- Succeeded by: Stephen Morris

Member of the Massachusetts House of Representatives
- In office 1977–1994

Personal details
- Born: July 7, 1943 (age 83) Milford, Massachusetts
- Party: Democratic
- Spouse: Joanne Moore (née Bednarz)
- Education: Colgate University; Clark University
- Profession: Educational Administrator

Richard T. Moore (born July 7, 1943) is a Democratic politician from Massachusetts and a former member of the Massachusetts State Senate.

== Biography ==
Richard T. Moore was born in Milford, Massachusetts. He is married to the former Joanne Bednarz of Uxbridge, Massachusetts. The couple lives in Uxbridge.

Moore is a graduate of Clark University, and he earned a master's degree in Student Personnel Administration from Colgate University. He has completed additional graduate-level courses at Clark and the University of Massachusetts Amherst.

== Massachusetts Senate (1977–1994) ==
From 1977 to 1994, Moore was, for nine terms, a member of the Massachusetts House of Representatives. During that tenure, Moore chaired three standing committees — Taxation, State Administration, and Election Laws — and served on numerous other committees and commissions.

In 1986, Moore unsuccessfully sought the Democratic nomination for Massachusetts state auditor. His opponents were state senator A. Joseph DeNucci and Boston city councilors Maura Hennigan and Charles Yancey. The four contenders launched their campaigns after the incumbent auditor, John J. Finnegan, made the surprise announcement in March that he would not seek another term. At the party's state convention in May, Moore was eliminated from contention. Mike add received 10% delegate support, below the 15% threshold of delegate support needed to qualify for the ballot in the September primary election. He was the only of the four contenders to be eliminated at the convention.

Moore co-chaired the 1992 Bill Clinton for President campaign in Massachusetts and was chosen as a member of the Presidential Electoral College that year. In 1994, President Clinton nominated Moore to serve as Associate Director of the Federal Emergency Management Agency (FEMA). He was subsequently confirmed by the United States Senate and served in that role under the Clinton Administration for two years, during which he led efforts to develop a National Mitigation Strategy — a comprehensive, nationwide plan to help individuals, communities, and states reduce the risk of disaster from natural and technological hazards. In 1996, he was presented with the "Distinguished Service Award" by FEMA Director James Lee Witt.

== Massachusetts Senate (1996–2015) ==
Moore was elected to the Massachusetts State Senate on April 23, 1996. He served as Chairman of the Joint Committee on Health Care Financing and was a member of the Senate Committee on Bills in Third Reading; the Senate Committee on Post-Audit and Oversight; the Joint Committee on Higher Education; and the Joint committee on Bonding, Capital Expenditures and State Assets.

Moore was a member of the Emergency Management Section of the American Society for Public Administration and co-chair, of the National Conference of State Legislatures' (NCSL) Task Force on Homeland Security and Emergency Response — created in the aftermath of the September 11 terrorist attacks. He was also a member of Executive Committee of the NCSL. In 2009 he was elected the President-elect of the National Conference of State Legislatures. He took office as president of NCSL, at the annual meeting in Louisville, KY on July 28, 2010.

In early 2013, Moore was promoted to the third highest post in the Massachusetts State Senate, President Pro Tempore.

On Tuesday, November 4, 2014, Moore was defeated by Ryan Fattman in the Massachusetts general election.

== See also ==
- 2013–2014 Massachusetts legislature

== Sources ==
- General Court profile
- Official Policy and Constituent Services web site
