= Massachusetts House of Representatives' 16th Worcester district =

American legislative district

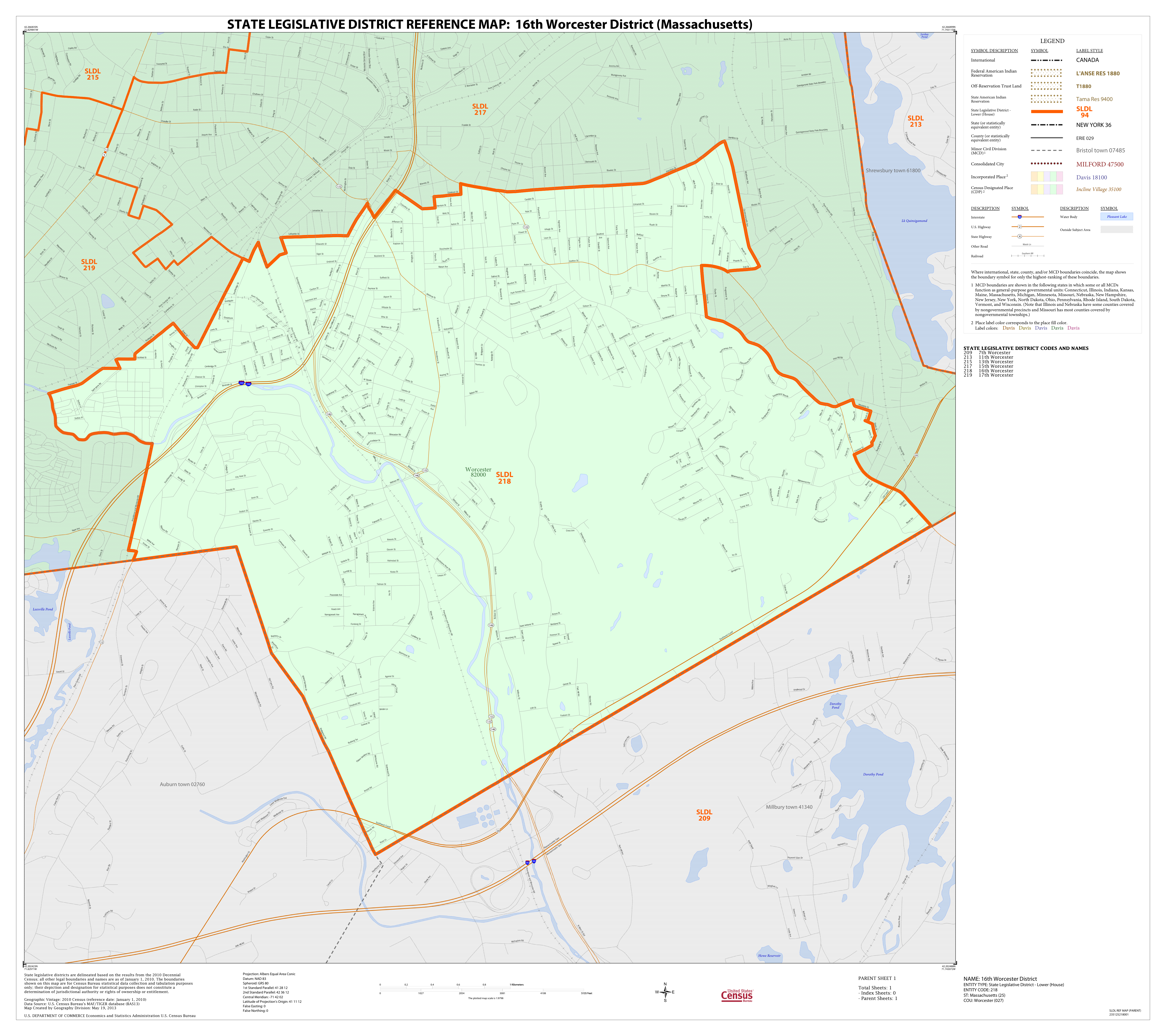
Map of Massachusetts House of Representatives' 16th Worcester district, based on the 2010 United States census.

Massachusetts House of Representatives' 16th Worcester district in the United States is one of 160 legislative districts included in the lower house of the Massachusetts General Court. It covers part of the city of Worcester in Worcester County. Democrat Dan Donahue of Worcester has represented the district since 2013.

The current district geographic boundary overlaps with that of the Massachusetts Senate's 2nd Worcester district.

== Representatives ==
- Otis Newton, circa 1858
- Jonas Fay, circa 1859
- Joseph P. Cheney Jr., circa 1888
- James Joseph Early, circa 1920
- Stanley Everett Johnson, circa 1951
- Raymond Michael Lafontaine, circa 1975
- William Glodis
- Guy Glodis
- John Fresolo
- Daniel M. Donahue, 2013-current

== Former locales ==
The district previously covered:

- Douglas, circa 1872
- Dudley, circa 1872
- Millbury, circa 1872
- Oxford, circa 1872
- Sutton, circa 1872
- Webster, circa 1872

== See also ==
- List of Massachusetts House of Representatives elections
- Other Worcester County districts of the Massachusetts House of Representatives: 1st, 2nd, 3rd, 4th, 5th, 6th, 7th, 8th, 9th, 10th, 11th, 12th, 13th, 14th, 15th, 17th, 18th
- Worcester County districts of the Massachusetts Senate: 1st, 2nd; Hampshire, Franklin and Worcester; Middlesex and Worcester; Worcester, Hampden, Hampshire and Middlesex; Worcester and Middlesex; Worcester and Norfolk
- List of Massachusetts General Courts
- List of former districts of the Massachusetts House of Representatives

== Images ==
Portraits of legislators

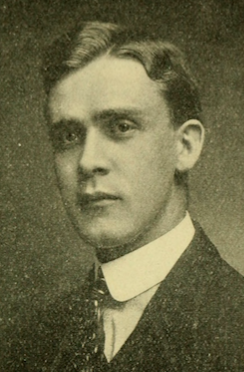
John McGrath

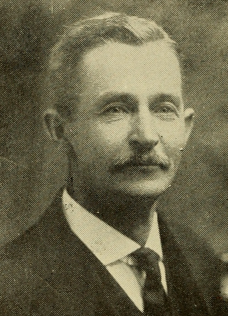
Charles Kelley

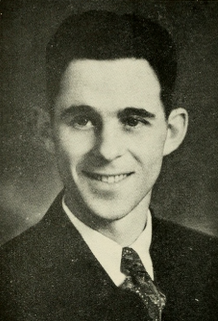
Timothy Cooney

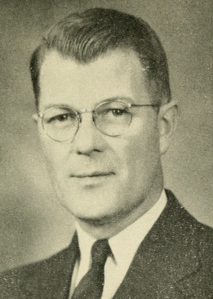
Ernest Johnson

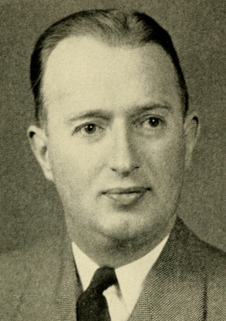
Stanley Everett Johnson

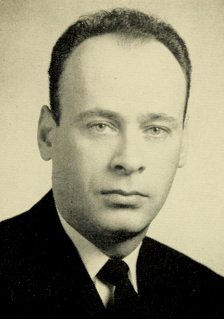
Albert Gammal

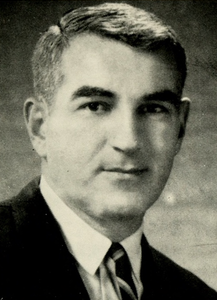
Raymond LaFontaine

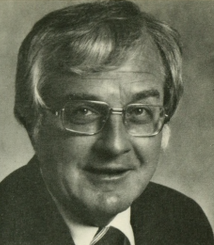
William Glodis

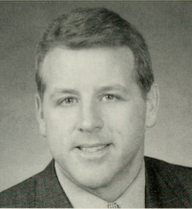
John Fresolo

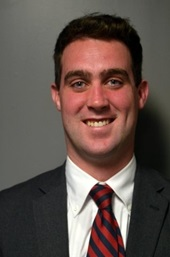
Dan Donahue
