= Massachusetts House of Representatives' 10th Worcester district =

American legislative district

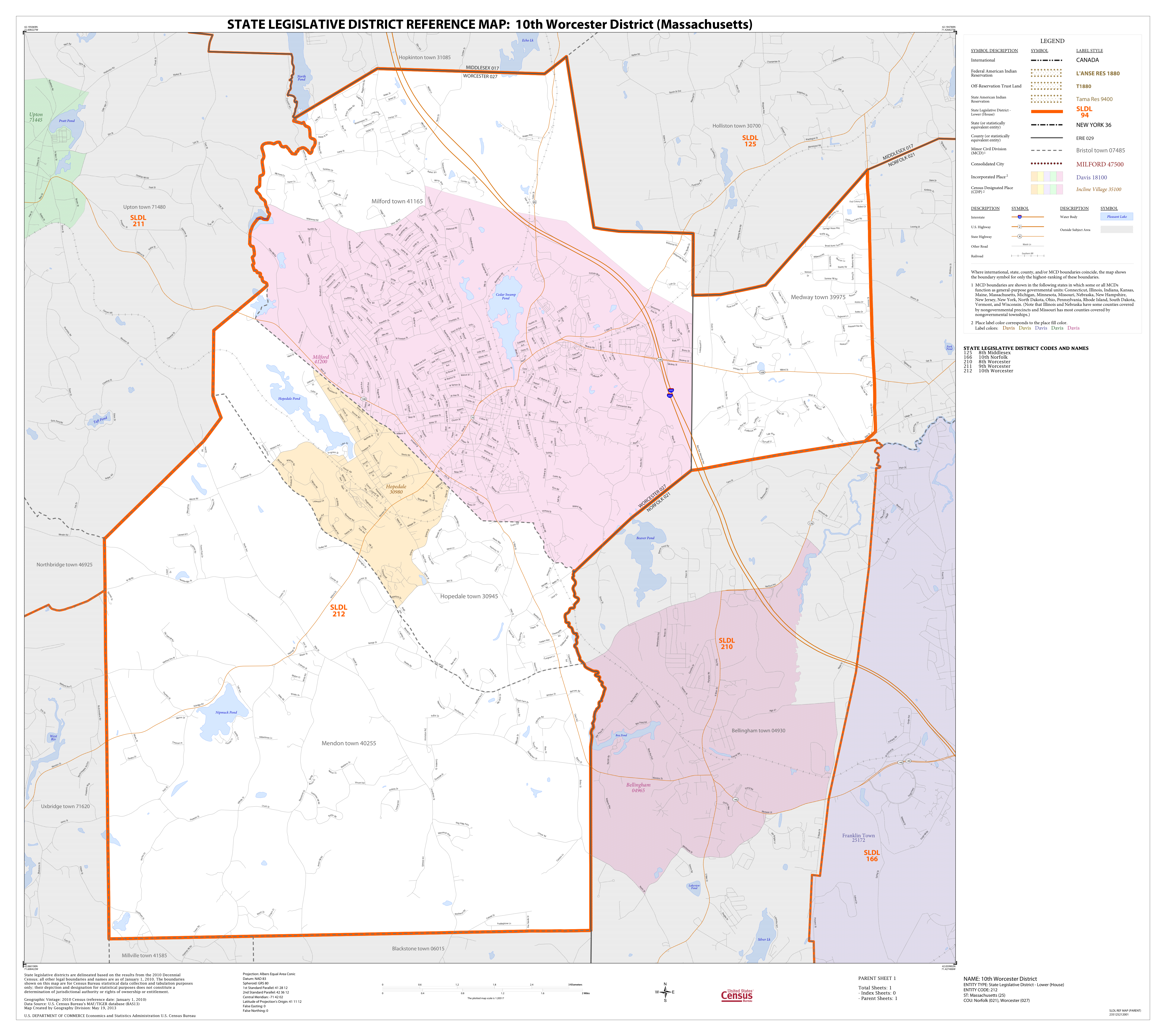
Map of Massachusetts House of Representatives' 10th Worcester district, based on the 2010 United States census.

Massachusetts House of Representatives' 10th Worcester district in the United States is one of 160 legislative districts included in the lower house of the Massachusetts General Court. It covers parts of Norfolk County and Worcester County. Democrat Brian Murray of Milford has represented the district since 2017.

== Towns represented ==
The district includes the following localities:

- Hopedale
- part of Medway
- Mendon
- Milford

The current district geographic boundary overlaps with those of the Massachusetts Senate's 2nd Middlesex and Norfolk district and Worcester and Norfolk district.

=== Former locales ===
The district previously covered:

- Paxton, circa 1872
- part of the city of Worcester, circa 1872

== Representatives ==
- Charles Brimblecom, circa 1858-1859
- Rowse Reynolds Clarke, circa 1888
- George C. F. Hudson, circa 1920
- Arthur H. Turner, circa 1920
- Fred Arthur Blake, circa 1951
- Thomas E. Creighton, circa 1975
- Salvatore Cimino, January 3, 1979 – January 7, 1981
- Marie Parente, January 7, 1981 – January 3, 2007
- John V. Fernandes, January 3, 2007 – January 4, 2017
- Brian W. Murray, 2017-current

== See also ==
- List of Massachusetts House of Representatives elections
- Other Worcester County districts of the Massachusetts House of Representatives: 1st, 2nd, 3rd, 4th, 5th, 6th, 7th, 8th, 9th, 11th, 12th, 13th, 14th, 15th, 16th, 17th, 18th
- Worcester County districts of the Massachusett Senate: 1st, 2nd; Hampshire, Franklin and Worcester; Middlesex and Worcester; Worcester, Hampden, Hampshire and Middlesex; Worcester and Middlesex; Worcester and Norfolk
- List of Massachusetts General Courts
- List of former districts of the Massachusetts House of Representatives

== Images ==
Portraits of legislators

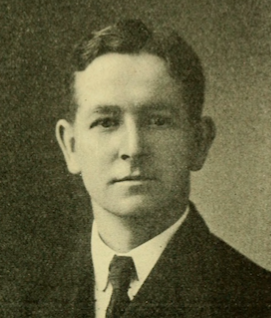
Charles Mayberry

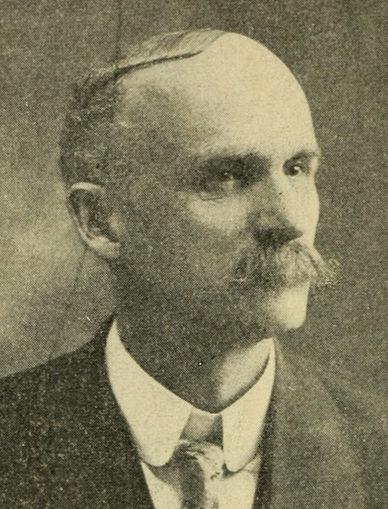
Joseph Gates

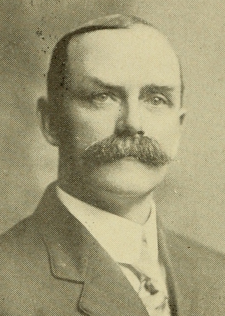
Edwin Corey

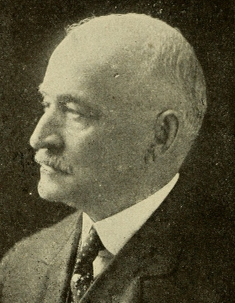
George Whitney

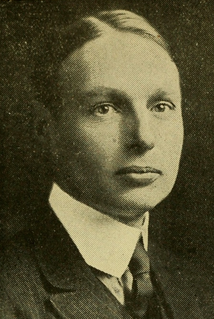
John Thayer

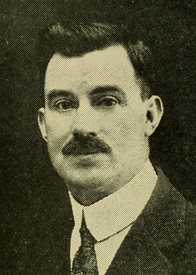
Thomas Johnston

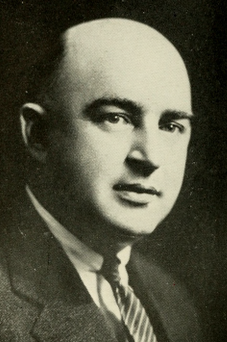
Arthur Mahan

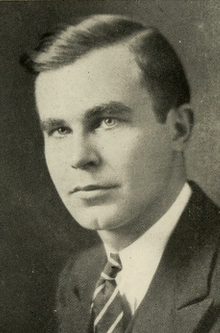
Richard Comerford

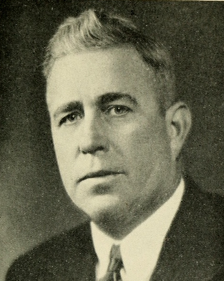
Earl Crockett

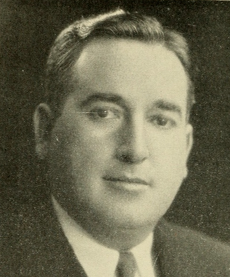
James Catusi

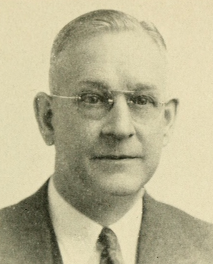
Marcus Newell Wright

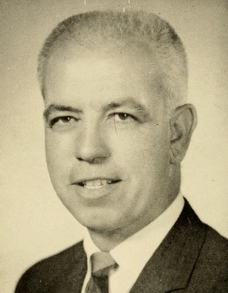
Anthony Grosso

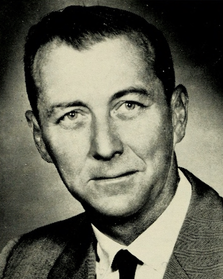
Thomas Creighton

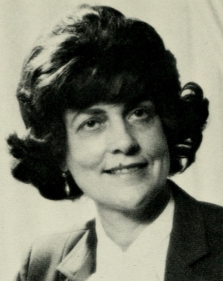
Marie Parente

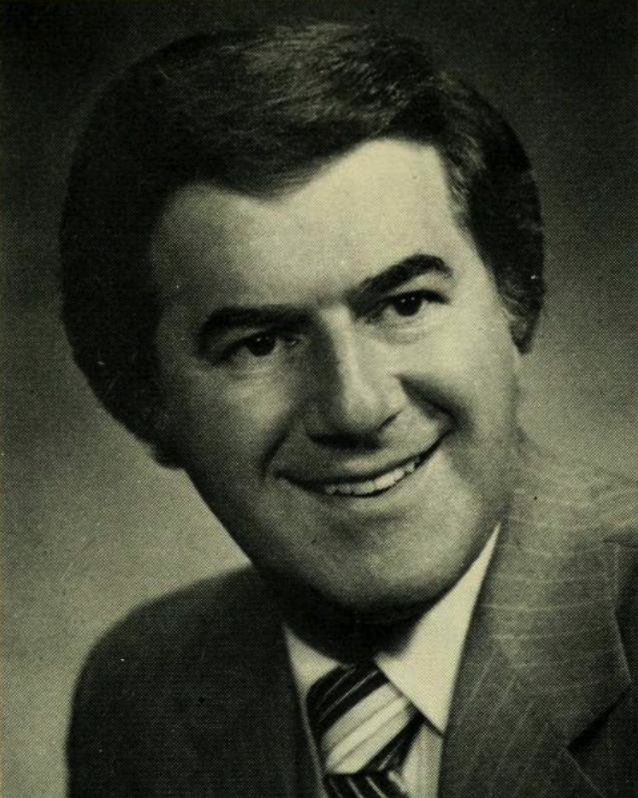
Salvatore Cimino
