= Brian Murray (politician) =

American politician

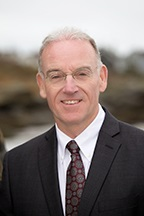
- Official portrait

Member of the Massachusetts House of Representatives from the 10th Worcester district
- Incumbent
- Assumed office January 4, 2017
- Preceded by: John V. Fernandes

Personal details
- Born: Milford, Massachusetts
- Party: Democratic
- Spouse: Emily
- Education: Stonehill College; New England School of Law

Brian W. Murray is an American state legislator serving in the Massachusetts House of Representatives. He is a Milford resident and a member of the Democratic Party.

== See also ==
- 2019–2020 Massachusetts legislature
- 2021–2022 Massachusetts legislature
