= Question 2 =

Question 2 is the name of various ballot measures in the United States:

- Maine Question 2 (disambiguation):
  - 2016 Maine Question 2, An Act to Establish The Fund to Advance Public Kindergarten to Grade 12 Education
  - 2017 Maine Question 2, An Act To Enhance Access to Affordable Health Care
- Massachusetts Question 2 (disambiguation):
  - 1980 Massachusetts Proposition 2½, ballot measure
  - 2002 Massachusetts Question 2, the Massachusetts English Language Education in Public Schools Initiative
  - Question 2, 2006 ballot
  - 2008 Massachusetts Question 2, the Massachusetts Sensible Marijuana Policy Initiative
  - 2010 Massachusetts Question 2, the Massachusetts Comprehensive Permits and Regional Planning Initiative
  - 2012 Massachusetts Question 2, the Massachusetts Death with Dignity Initiative
  - 2014 Massachusetts Question 2, the Massachusetts Expansion of Bottle Deposits Initiative
  - 2016 Massachusetts Question 2, the Massachusetts Charter School Expansion Initiative
  - Advisory Commission for Amendments to the U.S. Constitution, 2018 ballot
  - 2020 Massachusetts Question 2, the Massachusetts Ranked-Choice Voting Initiative
- Minnesota:
  - 2021 Minneapolis Question 2, the failed voter initiative to replace the police department with a public safety department
- Nevada Question 2 (disambiguation):
  - 2002 Nevada Question 2, a voter initiative to prohibit same-sex marriage in Nevada
  - Nevada Question 2 (2016), a voter initiative to legalize cannabis
  - 2020 Nevada Question 2, a voter initiative to allow same-sex marriage in Nevada
