= Massachusetts Question 2 =

Massachusetts Question 2 may refer to:

- 1980 Massachusetts Proposition 2½, 1980 ballot
- 2002 Massachusetts Question 2, the Massachusetts English Language Education in Public Schools Initiative
- Question 2, 2006 ballot
- 2008 Massachusetts Question 2, the Massachusetts Sensible Marijuana Policy Initiative
- 2010 Massachusetts Question 2, the Massachusetts Comprehensive Permits and Regional Planning Initiative
- 2012 Massachusetts Question 2, the Massachusetts Death with Dignity Initiative
- 2014 Massachusetts Question 2, the Massachusetts Expansion of Bottle Deposits Initiative
- 2016 Massachusetts Question 2, the Massachusetts Charter School Expansion Initiative
- Advisory Commission for Amendments to the U.S. Constitution, 2018 ballot
- 2020 Massachusetts Question 2, the Massachusetts Ranked-Choice Voting Initiative
