= 2026 Massachusetts ballot measures =

2026 Massachusetts referendums
- November 3, 2026

Nine ballot measures were on the ballot during the 2026 Massachusetts elections. Eleven measures were initially certified in January 2026, in addition to one veto referendum. However, three measures were subsequently struck from the ballot due to legal challenges.

The Massachusetts General Court had until May 2026 to either implement the proposals, reach a compromise with organizers, or do nothing, allowing organizers to gather more signatures to officially place the measures on the ballot. The state legislature did not choose to take action on any of the measures, allowing organizers to move forward with signature gathering. Twenty-five further measures were not certified. Legislative leaders have raised concerns about the number of ballot measures, which they claim are often crafted by special interest groups. A poll by the CommonWealth Beacon in September 2026 found that 76% of respondents described the increased number of ballot measures as a "good thing" while only 15% believed the state legislature should decide the issues rather than voters. By October 2026, committees supporting and opposing the various questions had raised a collective $24.3 million and spent a collective $22.1 million.

Topics of certified questions included a limit on lot size requirements to allow for single-family homes to be built on more plots of land (rejected), implementation of same-day voter registration (passed), a proposal to repeal Massachusetts's law allowing for recreational marijuana use (rejected), a proposal to replace party primaries with a single all-party primary that has the top two finishers advance to the general election (rejected), a proposal to place gubernatorial and legislative records under the state's public records law (passed), creation of a new land conservation fund to be funded by sales tax revenue (passed), a new limit to how much the state can collect in tax revenue (rejected), and a proposal to allow Committee for Public Counsel Services (a board which oversees the state's public defender system) employees to form a union (passed). One veto referendum, a proposal to repeal new gun control laws passed in 2024, was on the ballot in 2026. The new gun laws were kept in place.

A measure on legislative stipend reform to reduce extra pay received by lawmakers was initially certified, but an advisory opinion by the Supreme Judicial Court led to the measure being struck from the ballot. Another measure, which would have reduced the state income tax from 5% to 4%, was also struck down by the Supreme Judicial Court, which found that the ballot summary crafted by the attorney general was misleading. In addition, a proposal to re-implement rent control was also blocked by the Supreme Judicial Court due to mixing unrelated topics.

== Electoral system ==
In Massachusetts, a constitutional amendment or proposed law can be placed on the ballot by popular petition. If a petition collects 74,574 signatures, it will be considered by the General Court. If the General Court does not pass the proposal as is or reach a compromise with organizers, the petitioners can have their proposal placed on the ballot at the next general election if they collect 12,429 more signatures. In addition, a law passed by the General Court can be put to a veto referendum, in which the law must be passed by popular vote.

The first round of signatures needed to be submitted by December 3, 2025. The legislature had until May 5, 2026 to decide whether to implement the proposals. Organizers had until June 17 to gather the second round of signatures to place the measures on the ballot.

== Measures on the ballot ==
No.	Question				Status
1	Initiative Petition for a Law to Improve Access to Public Records	Full text of measure	Proponent website		Approved
2	Initiative Petition for a Law Relative to Labor Relations Policies for Committee for Public Counsel Services Employees	Full text of measure	Proponent website		Approved
3	Initiative Petition for a Law to Implement All-Party State Primaries	Full text of measure	Proponent website	Opponent website	Rejected
4	Initiative Petition for a Law Relative to Election Day Registration	Full text of measure	Proponent website		Approved
5	Initiative Petition for a Law Relative to Limiting State Tax Collection Growth and Returning Surpluses to Taxpayers	Full text of measure	Proponent website	Opponent website	Rejected
6	Initiative Petition for a Law to Protect Water & Nature	Full text of measure	Proponent website		Approved
7	Initiative Petition for a Law to Allow Single-Family Homes on Small Lots in Areas with Adequate Infrastructure	Full text of measure	Proponent website		Rejected
8	Initiative Petition for a Law Relative to Regulating Marijuana	Full text of measure	Proponent website	Opponent website	Rejected
9	Referendum on an Existing Law on an Act Modernizing Firearm Laws (Note: This measure is a veto referendum on a law already passed by the legislature. A "yes" vote means the law will be kept in place and a "no" vote means the law will be repealed.)	Full text of law	Keep law website	Repeal law website	Approved
Cit.

== Question 1 ==
A measure to make legislative and gubernatorial records fall under the state's public records law will be on the ballot. Massachusetts is the only state in which gubernatorial, legislative, and judicial records are not publicly accessible. The measure would contain some exceptions for sensitive information. Multiple attempts to pass similar laws through the legislature were met with failure in the past, leading organizers to go through the ballot initiative process instead. Question 1 passed.

The petition was filed in August 2025 by the Coalition for Healthy Democracy, a group led by former gubernatorial candidate Danielle Allen, alongside its all-party primaries petition (Question 3). Diana DiZoglio, a Democrat and the state auditor, endorsed the measure soon after and by late 2025 had taken over leading the campaign through her own committee, the Committee for Transparency and Democracy. DiZoglio donated $150,000 from her campaign account to the effort in October 2025.

The measure comes two years after the passage of 2024 Massachusetts Question 1, another measure supported by DiZoglio which gave her the ability to audit the state legislature. Since the passage of the 2024 measure, DiZoglio has been engaged in a protracted conflict with the legislature, which has resisted her calls for an audit, citing concerns about constitutional separation of powers.

The Massachusetts Senate challenged the proposed measure, along with another proposal regarding legislative stipend reform, at the Massachusetts Supreme Judicial Court. In April 2026, the court declined to make a ruling on the public records proposal, preferring to wait to see whether the new law is passed by voters. The measure was approved by voters in an extremely comfortable margin, with about 86% of voters approving of it.

=== Endorsements ===
Yes

State executive officials

- Maura Healey, 73rd Governor of Massachusetts (2023-present) (Democratic)
- Diana DiZoglio, 23rd Auditor of Massachusetts (2023–present) (Democratic)

2026 gubernatorial candidates

- Mike Minogue, Businessman (Republican)

Political parties

- Massachusetts Democratic Party
- Massachusetts Republican Party

Organizations

- Americans for Tax Reform
- Our Revolution Massachusetts
- Pioneer Institute
- River Valley Democratic Socialists of America
- League of Women Voters of Massachusetts
No

State legislators

- Karen Spilka, Senate President of Massachusetts (Democratic)

=== Polling ===
Poll source	Date(s) administered	Sample size (Note: Key: A – all adults RV – registered voters LV – likely voters V – unclear)	Margin of error	Yes (for the proposed law)	No (against the proposed law)	Undecided
Suffolk University/The Boston Globe	October 14–18, 2026	500 (LV)	± 4.4%	62%	20%	18% (Note: Includes "Refused" with <1%)
UMass Amherst/YouGov (Note: Poll sponsored by WCVB-TV.)	October 5–12, 2026	800 (RV)	± 4.2%	84%	6%	11% (Note: Includes "Do Not Understand Ballot Question" with 3%)
CommonWealth Beacon/MassINC Polling Group	September 14–22, 2026	800 (LV)	± 4.0%	63%	14%	23%
UMass Amherst/WCVB-TV	August 5–12, 2026	800 (RV)	± 4.4%	84%	7%	10% (Note: Includes "Do Not Understand Ballot Question" with 3%)
Suffolk University/The Boston Globe	November 19–23, 2025	500 (RV)	± 4.4%	84%	7%	9% (Note: Includes "Prefer not to say" with <1%)

=== Results ===
Question 1
Choice	Votes	%
For	2,200,938	85.92
Against	360,717	14.08
Total	2,561,655	100.00

== Question 2 ==
A measure to allow a labor union to be formed for the employees of the Committee for Public Counsel Services (CPCS), the government organization which employs the state's public defenders, will be on the ballot. The push comes in the aftermath of a strike by bar advocates, who are outside lawyers hired by the state as independent contractors to augment the public defenders which are direct employees of the CPCS. Bar advocates in Massachusetts are paid much less than comparable attorneys in neighboring states. The strike led to many defendants being released since there were not enough lawyers to provide counsel. The proposal, which is backed by existing labor unions, would allow CPCS employees to form a union through the same mechanisms that other state employees can. The measure was approved by voters, and CPCS employees will now be allowed to form a union.

=== Endorsements ===
Yes

U.S. representatives

- Stephen Lynch, MA‑8 (2013–present) (Democratic)

State legislators

- 8 state senators
- 6 state representatives

Local officials

- Sumbul Siddiqui, Mayor of Cambridge (2020–present) (Democratic)

Political parties

- Massachusetts Democratic Party
- Massachusetts Working Families Party

Labor Unions

- Massachusetts American Federation of Teachers
- National Association of Government Employees

Organizations

- Our Revolution Massachusetts
No

Organizations

- Americans for Tax Reform

=== Polling ===
Poll source	Date(s) administered	Sample size	Margin of error	Yes (for the proposed law)	No (against the proposed law)	Undecided
Suffolk University/The Boston Globe	October 14–18, 2026	500 (LV)	± 4.4%	56%	25%	18% (Note: Includes "Refused" with 1%)
UMass Amherst/WCVB-TV	October 5–12, 2026	800 (RV)	± 4.2%	53%	29%	28% (Note: Includes "Do Not Understand Ballot Question" with 14%)
CommonWealth Beacon/MassINC Polling Group	September 14–22, 2026	800 (LV)	± 4.0%	48%	25%	27% (Note: Includes "Prefer not to say" with 1%)
UMass Amherst/WCVB-TV	August 5–12, 2026	800 (RV)	± 4.4%	45%	24%	18% (Note: Includes "Do Not Understand Ballot Question" with 3%)

=== Results ===
Question 2
Choice	Votes	%
For	1,617,019	64.01
Against	909,148	35.99
Total	2,526,167	100.00

== Question 3 ==
A measure to introduce all-party primaries, or top-two primaries, will be on the ballot. The measure would implement a system similar to the one used in states like Washington, California and others, where all candidates participate on the same primary ballot, regardless of party, with the top two candidates advancing to the general election. Primary elections in Massachusetts are often uncontested, with proponents of the measure claiming that it could lead to more competition and higher turnout for primaries. Despite picking up a lot of support from many Democrats and Republicans, including state auditor Diana DiZoglio, former Democratic governor Deval Patrick, and former Republican governor Charlie Baker, the measure failed. About 61% of voters rejected the measure. Petersham ended up being the only municipality to approve of the measure.

The proposal has been met with opposition from state party leadership of both major parties. The Democratic State Committee also voted to formally oppose the measure, and two Democratic Party members initiated a lawsuit attempting to stop the measure from appearing on the ballot, which the Supreme Judicial Court rejected on June 22, 2026. On the other hand, some Republicans worry that the system may lead to general elections in which one Democrat faces off against another Democrat, with no Republican making it to the general election. The Massachusetts Republican Party opposes the measure. While the party itself opposes the proposal, some prominent individual Democrats have expressed support for it, including state auditor Diana DiZoglio, former governor Deval Patrick, and former state treasurer Steve Grossman.

The petition was filed in August 2025 by the Coalition for Healthy Democracy, whose convening chair is Danielle Allen, a Democratic candidate for governor in 2022. Its "Yes on 3" campaign raised over $2 million in 2025, much of which came from large donations from people with connections to private equity or investment firms. DiZoglio, Patrick, former Republican lieutenant governor Kerry Healey, and former congressman Joe Kennedy III are involved in the coalition.

By October 2026, proponents of the measure had spend $5.77 million in support of the measure, while opponents had spend just $50,000. The spending from proponents made Question 3 one of the most expensive Massachusetts ballot question campaign in 2026.

=== Endorsements ===
Yes

U.S. representatives

- Jake Auchincloss, MA‑4 (2021–present) (Democratic)
- Joe Kennedy III, MA‑4 (2013–2021) (Democratic)
- Seth Moulton, MA‑6 (2015–present) (Democratic)

State executive officials

- Charlie Baker, 72nd Governor of Massachusetts (2015–2023) (Republican)
- Deval Patrick, 71st Governor of Massachusetts (2007–2015) (Democratic)
- Tim Murray, 71st Lieutenant Governor of Massachusetts (2007–2013) (Democratic)
- Kerry Healey, 70th Lieutenant Governor of Massachusetts (2003–2007) (Forward)
- Diana DiZoglio, 23rd Auditor of Massachusetts (2023–present) (Democratic)
- Steve Grossman, 57th Treasurer and Receiver-General of Massachusetts (2011–2015) and former general Democratic National Committee chair (1997–1999) (Democratic)

Party officials

- Jennifer Nassour, former chairwoman of the Massachusetts Republican Party (2009–2011) (Republican)

Newspapers

- Boston Globe

State legislators

- 2 state senators
- 4 former state representatives

Local officials

- Gary Christenon, Mayor of Malden (2012–present) (Democratic)

Political parties

- Massachusetts Forward Party

Organizations

- Conservation Law Foundation
No

U.S. senators

- Ed Markey, Massachusetts (2013–present) (Democratic)

U.S. representatives

- Ayanna Pressley, MA‑7 (2019–present) (Democratic)

State legislators

- 7 state senators
- 11 state representatives

Local officials

- Michelle Wu, Mayor of Boston (2021–present) (Democratic)
- Brian Worrell, Boston City Councillor (2022–present) (Democratic)

Political parties

- Massachusetts Democratic Party
- Massachusetts Republican Party
- Massachusetts Working Families Party

Organizations

- Massachusetts AFL–CIO

=== Polling ===
Poll source	Date(s) administered	Sample size	Margin of error	Yes (for the proposed law)	No (against the proposed law)	Undecided
Suffolk University/The Boston Globe	October 14–18, 2026	500 (LV)	± 4.4%	47%	41%	12% (Note: Includes "Refused" with 1%)
UMass Amherst/WCVB-TV	October 5–12, 2026	800 (RV)	± 4.2%	49%	39%	12% (Note: Includes "Do Not Understand Ballot Question" with 3%)
CommonWealth Beacon/MassINC Polling Group	September 14–22, 2026	800 (LV)	± 4.0%	43%	36%	21% (Note: Includes "Prefer not to say" with 1%)
University of New Hampshire	September 17–21, 2026	564 (LV)	± 4.1%	41%	39%	19%
UMass Amherst/WCVB-TV	August 5–12, 2026	800 (RV)	± 4.4%	51%	32%	17% (Note: Includes "Do Not Understand Ballot Question" with 3%)

=== Results ===
Question 3
Choice	Votes	%
For	999,746	38.96
Against	1,566,336	61.04
Total	2,566,082	100.00

== Question 4 ==
A measure to introduce same-day voter registration will be on the ballot. The measure would scrap the existing registration deadline which requires voters in Massachusetts to register at least 10 days before election day. One of the main proponents of the measure is longtime Massachusetts Secretary of the Commonwealth William F. Galvin. Galvin is the elected official in charge of administering elections in the state. Galvin decided to gather signatures to place the measure directly on the ballot after the legislature refused to take up the issue over multiple legislative sessions. This measure passed.

Some local election officials have expressed worry about the extra work which may be required on election days. However, Galvin contends that same-day voter registration will actually reduce the burden on local officials by removing the need for unregistered voters to cast provisional ballots, which require officials to verify the eligibility of said voters after they have cast their ballots.

=== Endorsements ===
Yes

State executive officials

- Maura Healey, 73rd Governor of Massachusetts (2023-present) (Democratic)
- Andrea Campbell, 45th Attorney General of Massachusetts (2023-present) (Democratic)
- William Galvin, 27th Secretary of the Commonwealth (1995-present) (Democratic)

Political Parties

- Massachusetts Democratic Party

Labor Unions

- International Brotherhood of Teamsters
- Massachusetts American Federation of Teachers

Organizations

- ACLU of Massachusetts
- Common Cause of Massachusetts
- River Valley Democratic Socialists of America
- League of Women Voters of Massachusetts
No

Political parties

- Massachusetts Republican Party

Organizations

- Americans for Tax Reform

=== Polling ===
Poll source	Date(s) administered	Sample size	Margin of error	Yes (for the proposed law)	No (against the proposed law)	Undecided
Suffolk University/The Boston Globe	October 14–18, 2026	500 (LV)	± 4.4%	59%	33%	8% (Note: Includes "Refused" with 2%)
UMass Amherst/WCVB-TV	October 5–12, 2026	800 (RV)	± 4.2%	67%	26%	8% (Note: Includes "Do Not Understand Ballot Question" with 2%)
CommonWealth Beacon/MassINC Polling Group	September 14–22, 2026	800 (LV)	± 4.0%	53%	33%	14% (Note: Includes "Prefer not to say" with 1%)
University of New Hampshire	September 17–21, 2026	564 (LV)	± 4.1%	59%	38%	4%
UMass Amherst/WCVB-TV	August 5–12, 2026	800 (RV)	± 4.4%	69%	22%	5% (Note: Includes "Do Not Understand Ballot Question" with 3%)
Suffolk University/The Boston Globe	November 19–23, 2025	500 (RV)	± 4.4%	63.4%	31.8%	4.8%

=== Results ===
Question 4
Choice	Votes	%
For	1,445,864	56.35
Against	1,120,100	43.65
Total	2,565,964	100.00

== Question 5 ==
A measure to introduce new limits on how much tax revenue the state can collect while increasing tax rebates will be on the ballot. The measure would change the existing calculation which sets a limit to the amount of revenue the state can collect in a year to cut taxes. It would also include the new revenue gathered from a 2022 ballot measure which introduced a new tax on income over $1,000,000 in the calculation. The measure is backed by a coalition of business and trade groups. This measure failed.

The measure is opposed by labor unions and legislative leaders, who claim the measure (along with the other measure which would reduce the state income tax) would lead to deep cuts to social services and state spending. Supporters of the measure maintain that tax cuts would spur growth.

=== Endorsements ===
Yes

Political parties

- Massachusetts Republican Party

2026 gubernatorial candidates

- Mike Minogue, Businessman (Republican)

State legislators

- Ryan Fattman, State Senator (2015-present) (Republican)

Organizations

- Americans for Tax Reform
- Pioneer Institute
- National Federation of Independent Business
No

Political parties

- Massachusetts Democratic Party

Labor Unions

- Massachusetts American Federation of Teachers

Organizations

- River Valley Democratic Socialists of America
- League of Women Voters of Massachusetts

State legislators

- Karen Spilka, Senate President of Massachusetts (Democratic)

=== Polling ===
Poll source	Date(s) administered	Sample size	Margin of error	Yes (for the proposed law)	No (against the proposed law)	Undecided
Suffolk University/The Boston Globe	October 14–18, 2026	500 (LV)	± 4.4%	40%	38%	22% (Note: Includes "Refused" with 3%)
UMass Amherst/WCVB-TV	October 5–12, 2026	800 (RV)	± 4.2%	58%	20%	21% (Note: Includes "Do Not Understand Ballot Question" with 8%)
CommonWealth Beacon/MassINC Polling Group	September 14–22, 2026	800 (LV)	± 4.0%	47%	26%	26% (Note: Includes "Prefer not to say" with 1%)
UMass Amherst/WCVB-TV	August 5–12, 2026	800 (RV)	± 4.4%	67%	22%	8% (Note: Includes "Do Not Understand Ballot Question" with 3%)

=== Results ===
Question 5
Choice	Votes	%
For	1,209,498	47.71
Against	1,325,489	52.29
Total	2,534,987	100.00

== Question 6 ==
A measure to establish a fund to purchase land for conservation, water quality improvement, and recreation using state sales tax revenue from sporting goods will be on the ballot. The measure is supported by a coalition of nonprofit organizations and private companies which previously tried unsuccessfully to lobby the state legislature to pass a similar piece of legislation. In 2021, Massachusetts ranked last in the nation in funding per capita for state parks. This measure passed.

While no group arose to oppose the measure, state lawmakers still chose not to pass the measure, clearing the way for organizers to gather more signatures to place it on the ballot. Lawmakers could choose not to fund the new land conservation fund even if the measure passes.

Proponents spent over $3.5 million to promote the measure, making Question 6 one of the three most expensive ballot question campaigns in Massachusetts in 2026, despite no committee forming to oppose the measure.

=== Endorsements ===
Yes

State executive officials

- Maura Healey, 73rd Governor of Massachusetts (2023-present) (Democratic)
- Kim Driscoll, 73rd Lieutenant Governor of Massachusetts (2023-present) (Democratic)
- Deval Patrick, 71st Governor of Massachusetts (2007–2015) (Democratic)

Political parties

- Massachusetts Democratic Party

Corporations

- REI

Organizations

- Appalachian Mountain Club
- Conservation Law Foundation
- Massachusetts Audubon Society
- Mount Grace Land Conservation Trust
- The Nature Conservancy
- The Trustees of Reservations
- Trust for Public Land
No

2026 gubernatorial candidates

- Mike Minogue, Businessman (Republican)

Political parties

- Massachusetts Republican Party

Organizations

- Americans for Tax Reform

=== Polling ===
Poll source	Date(s) administered	Sample size	Margin of error	Yes (for the proposed law)	No (against the proposed law)	Undecided
Suffolk University/The Boston Globe	October 14–18, 2026	500 (LV)	± 4.4%	49%	39%	13% (Note: Includes "Refused" with 2%)
UMass Amherst/WCVB-TV	October 5–12, 2026	800 (RV)	± 4.2%	70%	19%	11% (Note: Includes "Do Not Understand Ballot Question" with 3%)
CommonWealth Beacon/MassINC Polling Group	September 14–22, 2026	800 (LV)	± 4.0%	56%	24%	20% (Note: Includes "Prefer not to say" with <1%)
University of New Hampshire	September 17–21, 2026	564 (LV)	± 4.1%	69%	15%	16%
UMass Amherst/WCVB-TV	August 5–12, 2026	800 (RV)	± 4.4%	59%	14%	16% (Note: Includes "Do Not Understand Ballot Question" with 3%)

=== Results ===
Question 6
Choice	Votes	%
For	1,547,696	60.83
Against	996,803	39.17
Total	2,544,499	100.00

== Question 7 ==
A ballot proposal to prohibit any law or zoning ordinance from requiring minimum lot sizes higher than 5,000 square feet will be on the ballot. The proposal, called "Legalize Starter Homes" by supporters, would also prohibit local authorities from implementing special permitting requirements to build single-family residences in residential zoning districts. The measure aims to alleviate the high cost of housing in Massachusetts by allowing for more homes to be built. This measure narrowly failed.

It has been compared to the rent control proposal, which was set to be on the ballot until it was struck by the Supreme Judicial Court. Organizers for the rent control measure criticized the lot size measure and vice versa. While both measures aimed to alleviate the state's housing crisis, the lot size measure aims to do so by increasing supply while the rent control measure aimed to restrict cost.

Municipal organizations have criticized the measure, which would apply to all municipalities in Massachusetts except Boston, for bypassing local control. Organizers for the measure claim that the measure could cause 2,200 to 5,700 homes to be built each year and that 700,000 new buildable lots would be created.

=== Endorsements ===
Yes

U.S. representatives

- Jake Auchincloss, MA‑4 (2021–present) (Democratic)

State executive officials

- Maura Healey, 73rd Governor of Massachusetts (2023-present) (Democratic)
- Kim Driscoll, 73rd Lieutenant Governor of Massachusetts (2023-present) (Democratic)

State legislators

- 6 state senators
- 7 state representatives

Local officials

- Sumbul Siddiqui, Mayor of Cambridge (2020–present) (Democratic)
- Jared Nicholson, Mayor of Lynn (2022–present) (Democratic)
- Jon Mitchell, Mayor of New Bedford (2012–present) (Democratic)
- Joshua Garcia, Mayor of Holyoke (2021–present) (Democratic)

2026 gubernatorial candidates

- Mike Minogue, Businessman (Republican)

Political parties

- Massachusetts Democratic Party

Corporations

- Airbnb

Organizations

- American Planning Association Massachusetts
- Boston Democratic Socialists of America
- League of Women Voters of Massachusetts
No

Political parties

- Massachusetts Republican Party

Organizations

- Americans for Tax Reform

=== Polling ===
Poll source	Date(s) administered	Sample size	Margin of error	Yes (for the proposed law)	No (against the proposed law)	Undecided
Suffolk University/The Boston Globe	October 14–18, 2026	500 (LV)	± 4.4%	41.2%	40.6%	18.2% (Note: Includes "Refused" with 1.8%)
UMass Amherst/WCVB-TV	October 5–12, 2026	800 (RV)	± 4.2%	65%	21%	14% (Note: Includes "Do Not Understand Ballot Question" with 4%)
CommonWealth Beacon/MassINC Polling Group	September 14–22, 2026	800 (LV)	± 4.0%	51%	24%	25% (Note: Includes "Prefer not to say" with 1%)
University of New Hampshire	September 17–21, 2026	564 (LV)	± 4.1%	59%	14%	26%
UMass Amherst/WCVB-TV	August 5–12, 2026	800 (RV)	± 4.4%	59%	21%	14% (Note: Includes "Do Not Understand Ballot Question" with 3%)

=== Results ===
Question 7
Choice	Votes	%
For	1,255,840	49.35
Against	1,288,793	50.65
Total	2,544,633	100.00

== Question 8 ==
A measure to re-criminalize the retail sale of recreational marijuana will be on the ballot. The measure would repeal a measure passed by voters in 2016 which legalized and regulated recreational marijuana. The measure is backed by the national anti-legalization group Smart Approaches to Marijuana. Adults over 21 years old would still be allowed to possess up to one ounce of marijuana, but the legal dispensaries which have opened since legalization would be shut down. Perhaps being the most notorious measure on the ballot, it failed in a very large margin. Every single municipality voted no.

Advocates for the measure claim that legalization has harmed public health and safety. Opponents of the measure contend that the measure would hurt the economy and eliminate jobs by dismantling the new industry. Opponents have initiated legal action against organizers. A complaint was filed accusing organizers of misleading voters during the signature gathering phase, although the complaint was dismissed. A separate lawsuit brought before the Supreme Judicial Court claimed that the measure illegally mixes unrelated subjects by also including a requirement that young adults attend a drug awareness program if they are caught with marijuana. The lawsuit was dismissed by the court, which ruled that the question did not excessively mix topics.

Advocates of Question 8 in favor of banning the sale of marijuana spent over $3.6 million to promote the measure, almost all of which came from Smart Approaches to Marijuana. Opponents of the measure spent $1.5 million, mostly funded by cannabis businesses in the state. The high spending made it one of the three most expensive ballot question campaigns in 2026.

=== Endorsements ===
Yes

Organizations

- Smart Approaches to Marijuana
No

U.S. senators

- Ed Markey, Massachusetts (2013–present) (Democratic)
- Elizabeth Warren, Massachusetts (2013–present) (Democratic)

U.S. representatives

- Ayanna Pressley, MA‑7 (2019–present) (Democratic)

State legislators

- 19 state senators
- 44 state representatives

Local officials

- Michelle Wu, Mayor of Boston (2021–present) (Democratic)
- Joseph Petty, Mayor of Worcester (2021–present) (Democratic)

2026 gubernatorial candidates

- Mike Minogue, Businessman (Republican)

State executive officials

- Maura Healey, 73rd Governor of Massachusetts (2023-present) (Democratic)

Political parties

- Massachusetts Democratic Party

Organizations

- ACLU of Massachusetts
- Marijuana Policy Project
- National Association of Social Workers
- River Valley Democratic Socialists of America
- Worcester City Council

=== Polling ===
Poll source	Date(s) administered	Sample size	Margin of error	Yes (for the proposed law)	No (against the proposed law)	Undecided
Suffolk University/The Boston Globe	October 14–18, 2026	500 (LV)	± 4.4%	21%	71%	7% (Note: Includes "Refused" with 1%)
UMass Amherst/WCVB-TV	October 5–12, 2026	800 (RV)	± 4.2%	31%	61%	8% (Note: Includes "Do Not Understand Ballot Question" with 3%)
CommonWealth Beacon/MassINC Polling Group	September 14–22, 2026	800 (LV)	± 4.0%	27%	61%	12% (Note: Includes "Prefer not to say" with 1%)
University of New Hampshire	September 17–21, 2026	564 (LV)	± 4.1%	24%	71%	5%
UMass Amherst/WCVB-TV	August 5–12, 2026	800 (RV)	± 4.4%	33%	55%	10% (Note: Includes "Do Not Understand Ballot Question" with 3%)

=== Results ===
Question 8
Choice	Votes	%
For	632,881	24.37
Against	1,964,006	75.63
Total	2,596,887	100.00

== Question 9 ==
On July 25, 2024, Governor Maura Healey signed into law a bill cracking down on homemade firearms. The new law expanded on existing red flag laws in the state. The bill banned anyone besides law enforcement officials from carrying guns inside a school, government building, or polling site and created new restrictions on gun modifications while also adding new requirements for people applying for gun licenses, including a new standardized test. The legal definition of assault weapons was expanded to include more types of weapons. This measure passed, and the law will be retained.

Gun rights activists quickly organized against the new law, believing it to erode the constitutional right to bear arms. They gathered over 90,000 signatures to place the law on the 2026 ballot as a veto referendum, in which the law must be passed by popular vote before it can come into effect. They gathered the required number of signatures by October 2024. While a veto referendum reaching the required number of signatures would normally suspend a law, Governor Healey declared the law an emergency, meaning the law would be in effect before the referendum.

Unlike other types of measures, veto referendums can be placed on the ballot immediately after the first round of signature gathering is completed and do not have to wait for the state legislature to decide whether or not to implement the law. As such, the gun law veto referendum was formally placed on the ballot before the initiative petitions.

=== Endorsements ===
Yes

U.S. representatives

- Jake Auchincloss, MA‑4 (2021–present) (Democratic)
- Ayanna Pressley, MA‑7 (2019–present) (Democratic)
- Katherine Clark, MA‑5 (2013–present) (Democratic)

State executive officials

- Maura Healey, 73rd Governor of Massachusetts (2023-present) (Democratic)
- Andrea Campbell, 45th Attorney General of Massachusetts (2023-present) (Democratic)

State legislators

- 1 state senator
- 9 state representatives

Local officials

- Michelle Wu, Mayor of Boston (2021–present) (Democratic)

Political Parties

- Massachusetts Democratic Party

Labor Unions

- 1199SEIU United Healthcare Workers East
- SEIU 32BJ
- Massachusetts American Federation of Teachers
- Massachusetts AFL–CIO

Organizations

- Brady Campaign
- Everytown for Gun Safety
- League of Women Voters of Massachusetts
- March for Our Lives
No

2026 gubernatorial candidates

- Mike Minogue, Businessman (Republican)

Political parties

- Massachusetts Republican Party

State legislators

- 2 state representatives

Corporations

- Smith & Wesson

=== Polling ===
Poll source	Date(s) administered	Sample size	Margin of error	Yes (uphold the law)	No (overturn the law)	Undecided
Suffolk University/The Boston Globe	October 14–18, 2026	500 (LV)	± 4.4%	57%	31%	11% (Note: Includes "Refused" with 2%)
UMass Amherst/WCVB-TV	October 5–12, 2026	800 (RV)	± 4.2%	70%	21%	10% (Note: Includes "Do Not Understand Ballot Question" with 3%)
CommonWealth Beacon/MassINC Polling Group	September 14–22, 2026	800 (LV)	± 4.0%	70% (Note: The September CommonWealth Beacon/MassINC Polling Group poll asked two questions regarding Question 9. The first asks if the election were held today, would the respondent vote yes or no on Question 9.)	18%	12% (Note: Includes "Prefer not to say" with 1%)
CommonWealth Beacon/MassINC Polling Group	September 14–22, 2026	800 (LV)	± 4.0%	65% (Note: The September CommonWealth Beacon/MassINC Polling Group poll asked two questions regarding Question 9. The second asks the following: "Just to clarify, do you think the firearm law as described above should be kept in place, or should it be repealed?)	19%	16% (Note: Includes "Prefer not to say" with 1%)
University of New Hampshire	September 17–21, 2026	564 (LV)	± 4.1%	38%	27%	35%
UMass Amherst/WCVB-TV	August 5–12, 2026	800 (RV)	± 4.4%	70%	22%	5% (Note: Includes "Do Not Understand Ballot Question" with 3%)

=== Results ===
Question 9
Choice	Votes	%
For	1,755,479	67.32
Against	852,112	32.68
Total	2,607,591	100.00

== Measures not on ballot ==
=== Reduction in state income tax ===
A measure to reduce the state income tax from the current 5% to 4% was proposed. The ballot initiative would have gradually reduced Massachusetts's state tax rates for personal taxable income, which includes salaries, wages, interest and dividends. In the 2027 financial year, the tax rate would be 4.67%, down from 5%, followed by 4.33% in 2028. From the following year, taxable income would be taxed at a rate of 4.00%.

Opponents of the measure, including many state lawmakers, have claimed that deep cuts to services would be required if the measure were to be passed. Proponents contend that the tax cut would help address the state's affordability crisis. In June, the state legislature moved to halt proposed tax reforms which would benefit businesses. This was done to reduce the potential impact of the ballot measure on the state budget. The move would reduce the benefits businesses would gain from the tax cut.

Labor unions sued to attempt to keep the measure off the ballot, asserting that the ballot summary drafted by attorney general Andrea Campbell was misleading. The Supreme Judicial Court ruled in their favor, finding that the summary was misleading to voters as it did not mention the fact that the measure would also reduce capital gains tax. As such, the measure was struck from the November ballot and blocked from proceeding further. Organizers announced that they would consider a fresh attempt at a similar measure for the 2028 election cycle.

=== Legislative stipend reform ===
An initiative to reform how legislative stipends are given out was certified to be on the ballot in January 2026. However, it was blocked from proceeding to the ballot in May. In Massachusetts, the base pay for all members of the state legislature earn a base pay of around $82,000. However, legislative leaders, such as committee chairs, vice chairs, and leaders of both houses earn significantly more thanks to legislative stipends paid to lawmakers to compensate them for their additional responsibilities. The proposed ballot measure seeks to reduce this excess pay, with organizers claiming that the current system allows leadership to reward loyalty by paying their appointed committee chairs significantly more than regular legislators.

The Massachusetts Senate challenged the proposed measure, along with another measure concerning an expansion to the state's public records law, at the Massachusetts Supreme Judicial Court. In April 2026, after the measure had already been certified as constitutional by the attorney general, the court issued an advisory opinion which found that the proposal was unconstitutional. Initiative petitions in Massachusetts can only concern either laws or constitutional amendments, and the court found that the stipend proposal concerned the internal rules of the legislature. The opinion did not immediately strike it from the ballot; it was essentially a recommendation that the attorney general should not allow the measure to move forward. In May, the attorney general's office sent a letter to the secretary of state which declared that the measure could not legally be placed on the ballot. The secretary of state's office informed petition organizers that they would no longer be able to collect signatures. Organizers vowed to place a similar measure on the ballot in 2028.

=== Rent control ===
A ballot proposal to re-institute rent control was proposed for the 2026 Massachusetts ballot. (Note: In September 2025, Attorney General Andrea Campbell verified a ballot petition to implement rent control across the state, allowing supporters to collect nearly 75,000 signatures to put the measure on the ballot. In November 2025, supporters claimed they collected enough signatures to move it forward in the process.) If adopted, it would have become the strictest rent control law in the country. Unlike the previous version of rent control, in which individual cities and towns could choose whether or not they wanted to have rent control, this measure would cap rent increases at the rate of inflation, or 5% a year, whichever is lower, across the entire Commonwealth. The real estate industry pledged to spend $30 million against the measure. The coalition Keep Massachusetts Home, formed in support of the measure, reported $57,000 raised in 2025 year-end campaign finance reports.

On June 23, 2026, the Supreme Judicial Court disallowed the question from appearing on the ballot. The Court said the exemption in the proposed law for religious institutions violated the Massachusetts Constitution because, "to enforce the proposed law, the exemption would require the government to determine if a facility is ‘operated solely for... religious... purposes,’ and then make an enforcement decision based on the facility’s religious purpose (or lack thereof)." Supporters called the ruling a "massive disappointment" and said "the issue raised by the court is easily fixable and doesn’t effect the substance of our proposal." They pledged to bring it back at a future election.

==== Market reactions ====
After the ballot question was certified, Governor Maura Healey announced that funding had been pulled for multiple housing projects representing thousands of new units, with funding flowing instead to projects in other states without rent control. In March 2026, National Real Estate Advisors, who had previously invested billions of dollars in Massachusetts over the prior 20 years, announced that they would stop investing in Massachusetts because of the prospect of rent control returning. The proposed ballot measure would exempt new construction for 10 years; developers of multifamily housing base their projects on timelines of between 20 and 40 years.

Other developers have announced they will stop building in Massachusetts if the measure were to pass. Banks also reported a "sharp drop" in the number of loans to build multifamily housing because of concerns about the ballot measure. Developers are telling the banks that "[w]e don’t have to invest in Massachusetts. We can invest in Connecticut or New York."

According to Cabot, Cabot & Forbes, "the prospect of rent control has effectively suspended investor appetite for new investments in Massachusetts." The company's CEO, Jay Doherty, said that investors, which include pension funds, endowments, and bundles of private investors, "will not even look at [a CC&F] project" because the returns would be too low with rent control. "Rent control is just another piece of iron rebar on the camel’s back," according to Doherty.

==== Economic projections ====
A report from the Greater Boston Real Estate Board and the Center for State Policy Analysis at Tufts University found that adoption of the law would trigger a "fiscal tsunami" by wiping out $300 billion from home and property values. This, in turn, would cause a "cascade of effects" by reducing how much municipalities were able to take in property taxes, leading to cuts to services in urban areas and rural areas alike. Because the value of apartments would decrease, and because landlords would have less money to invest in them, buildings would begin to deteriorate. This would reduce the value of the homes around it, and decrease the tax base as a result.

According to Worcester mayor Joseph Petty, removing this much of the tax base would be "catastrophic to local municipal budgets." The mayor predicts that Worcester would lose 18.53% of the city’s property value by 2036 if the measure passed. This would require the residential tax rate to increase by 22.74%.

"Rent control would devalue properties with crushing effects on our budgets that support teachers and education, police, fire, and public safety, and infrastructure maintenance and improvement in our cities and towns," according to Methuen Mayor D.J. Beauregard.

A study by the Fiscal Alliance Foundation found that homeowners would see a 6% increase in the tax rate as more value was placed on owner-occupied properties and values fell on rental units. In Boston, tax rates on the average home would rise by $1,117, in Lowell by $570, and in Amherst by $889. Paul Craney, the executive director of the Fiscal Alliance Foundation, calls the proposal "a tax increase on homeowners."

Wealthy renters would benefit more from rent control than poorer renters would in pure dollar amount terms because the base rent is already higher. The economic benefit of rent control would flow from landlords to those who are already renting apartments, and not to those most in need.

==== Public opinion ====
A poll conducted by Suffolk University in November 2025 found 62.6% of all respondents supported capping rent increases, with 30.6% opposed. A poll in February 2026 found 56% in favor.

==== Politicians in favor ====
Boston mayor Michelle Wu considered the measure imperfect, but planned to vote for it, citing the need to make housing more affordable. Other officials in Cambridge and Somerville have also voiced support for the initiative. The Homes for All coalition was formed to support the measure.

==== Politicians opposed ====
Governor Maura Healey opposed the ballot measure, saying that if “you look at the studies, you effectively halt production” with rent control. Others who supported rent control in general opposed this particular measure, saying that "as proposed, this ballot question is a terrible idea."

A group of 12 mayors, including those from some of the Commonwealth's densest cities and those with the highest population of renters, opposed the measure. They cited its likely effect of slowing down housing production, the negative impacts it would have on municipal budgets, and how it would ultimately hurt, not help, the effort to bring down housing prices. The cons, they say, outweighed the pros, making it counterproductive. Worcester mayor Joseph Petty opposed the measure, saying it would have "disastrous consequences."

==== Business groups opposed ====
The non-partisan, business-backed Massachusetts Taxpayers Foundation declared that passage would result in "worsening the housing shortage in Massachusetts and degrading the existing housing stock. Rent control should not be adopted because it will exacerbate housing shortages, drive up housing costs, and increase property taxes for homeowners."

The Worcester Chamber of Commerce opposed the measure question because of "the significant harm it [would] inflict on the housing development pipeline across Worcester and Central Massachusetts." In February 2026, a campaign opposing the ballot measure, Housing for Massachusetts, was launched. The chairman of Housing for Massachusetts called the ballot question "the nation’s most extreme rent control proposal."

== Notes ==
Partisan clients

Preceded by 2024	Massachusetts Ballot Measures; 2026	Succeeded by 2028
