= 2028 Massachusetts ballot measures =

2028 Massachusetts referendums
- November 7, 2028

Several ballot measures may be on the ballot during the 2028 Massachusetts elections.

== Electoral system ==
In Massachusetts, a constitutional amendment or proposed law can be placed on the ballot by popular petition. If a petition collects enough signatures, it will be considered by the General Court. If the General Court does not pass the proposal, the petitioners can have their proposal placed on the ballot at the next general election if they collect additional signatures. In addition, a law passed by the General Court can be put to a veto referendum, in which the law must be passed by popular vote.

== Measures potentially on the ballot ==
The final list and ordering is not yet finalized. Massachusetts Secretary of the Commonwealth William F. Galvin decides the final ordering of questions on the ballot.

=== Abortion ===
In 2026, the General Court passed a law (Note: Chapter 188 of the Acts of 2026) which allows abortions to be performed up until the moment of birth. Opponents collected nearly 100,000 signatures to repeal the law, nearly double the 49,716 required to suspend the law until voters could decide if it should be repealed in 2028.

In November 2026, Governor Maura Healey appended an emergency preamble to the law which caused the law to go into effect immediately, preventing it from being suspended. A law would normally be suspended when a repeal campaign meets the signature threshold. (Note: Two years prior, Healey used the same power to immediately implement a gun control law, which was subsequently passed by voters in 2026.)

=== Data center restrictions ===
An initiative to restrict the construction and expansion of data centers may be on the ballot. In November 2026, the Committee to Restrict Data Centers filed paperwork to launch a campaign to place the measure on the ballot.

The new proposed requirements and restrictions include a requirement for new projects to receive support of two-thirds of voters in effected towns, a requirement that electricity providers agree not to shift the costs on other customers, and a requirement that new projects use exclusively renewable energy. It would restrict non-disclosure agreements and water use. State senator John Velis supported the campaign and organizers stated that one of the goals of the campaign was to prompt legislative action.

=== Legislative stipend reform ===
An initiative to reform how legislative stipends are given out was certified to be on the 2026 ballot. In Massachusetts, the base pay for all members of the state legislature earn a base pay of around $82,000. However, legislative leaders, such as committee chairs, vice chairs, and leaders of both houses earn significantly more thanks to legislative stipends paid to lawmakers to compensate them for their additional responsibilities. The proposed ballot measure sought to reduce this excess pay, with organizers claiming that the current system allows leadership to reward loyalty by paying their appointed committee chairs significantly more than regular legislators.

Initiative petitions in Massachusetts can only concern either laws or constitutional amendments, and the Supreme Judicial Court found in an advisory opinion that the stipend proposal concerned the internal rules of the legislature. The opinion did not immediately strike it from the ballot; it was essentially a recommendation that the attorney general should not allow the measure to move forward. In May, the attorney general's office sent a letter to the secretary of state which declared that the measure could not legally be placed on the ballot. The secretary of state's office informed petition organizers that they would no longer be able to collect signatures. Organizers vowed to place a similar measure on the ballot in 2028.

=== Rent control ===
A ballot proposal to re-institute rent control was proposed for the 2026 Massachusetts ballot. If adopted, it would have become the strictest rent control law in the country. Unlike the previous version of rent control, in which individual cities and towns could choose whether or not they wanted to have rent control, this measure would cap rent increases at the rate of inflation, or 5% a year, whichever is lower, across the entire Commonwealth.

On June 23, 2026, the Supreme Judicial Court disallowed the question from appearing on the ballot. The Court said the exemption in the proposed law for religious institutions violated the Massachusetts Constitution because "to enforce the proposed law, the exemption would require the government to determine if a facility is ‘operated solely for... religious... purposes,’ and then make an enforcement decision based on the facility's religious purpose (or lack thereof)". Supporters pledged to bring it back at a future election.

== Notes ==
Preceded by 2026	Massachusetts Ballot Measures; 2028	Succeeded by 2030
