= 2020 Massachusetts ballot measures =

2020 Massachusetts referendums
- November 3, 2020
- Questions: 1. Enhance, Update, and Protect the 2013 Motor Vehicle Right to Repair Law; 2. Law to Implement Ranked-Choice Voting in Elections

Question 1: Right to repair
Yes	74.97%
No	25.03%
Proposal approved

Question 2: Ranked-choice voting
Yes	45.22%
No	54.78%
Proposal rejected

Two ballot measures were certified for the November 3, 2020, general election in the state of Massachusetts. Multiple other ballot measures that were initiated by supporters did not meet requirements, thus they did not appear on the ballot.

The Constitution of Massachusetts can be amended through initiative, and state statutes can be proposed through initiative. In Massachusetts, after the Attorney General determines which measure(s) will appear on the ballot, an official name is assigned to each question. The Secretary of the Commonwealth has discretion over the ordering of questions on the ballot.

== Measures on the ballot ==
As of April 2020, four measures (19–06, 19–10, 19–11, and 19–14) had achieved the required number of initial signatures and were pending in the Massachusetts General Court. The measures could be passed by the legislature before May 5, 2020, or if that failed to happen, petitioners were required collect an additional 13,347 signatures in support of each measure to be placed on the ballot. Due to the COVID-19 pandemic and the effects of social distancing on in-person signature collection, a lawsuit to allow for electronic signatures in support of ballot initiatives was raised with the Massachusetts Supreme Judicial Court. In late April, a court judgement to allow for electronic signatures was agreed to by Massachusetts Secretary of the Commonwealth William F. Galvin and supporters of the four measures. In early July, supporters of two of the four measures (19-06 and 19–10) announced that they had submitted a sufficient number of signatures to qualify for the ballot. Galvin certified both measures to appear on the 2020 ballot.

No.	Question	Status
1	Initiative Law to Enhance, Update and Protect the 2013 Motor Vehicle Right to Repair Law: Full text of measure; Website Link	Approved
2	Initiative Petition for a Law to Implement Ranked-Choice Voting in Elections: Full text of measure; Website link	Rejected
Cit.

== Measures not on the ballot ==
Several measures were not certified to circulate because they went against Massachusetts law on ballot measures. Others were cleared for circulation but did not collect enough initial signatures for the December 4, 2019 deadline

Despite reaching a sufficient number of signatures in the first round, supporters of two measures (19-11 and 19–14) failed to collect the necessary number of signatures in the second round. By early July both initiatives had "effectively dropped their 2020 efforts".

No.	Status	Title	Summary	Text	Website
19-01	Did not collect signatures	Petition for a Constitutional Amendment Regarding the Public Funding of Abortion	This proposed constitutional amendment would permit the state to exclude abortion services from state-funded health care.		
19-02	Did not collect signatures	Mass Gun Safe Law	This proposed law would hold gun owners in Massachusetts liable for harm caused by anyone using an unsecured weapon obtained, with or without consent of the weapon's owner, from any residence, business, or vehicle. It would require all gun owners in Massachusetts to keep all weapons in their residence, business, or vehicle secured in a gun safe.		
19-03	Did not collect signatures	Initiative Petition for a Constitutional Amendment to Restore the Right to Vote	This proposed constitutional amendment would remove the existing prohibition against voting by persons incarcerated because of a felony conviction. Such persons would become able to vote in elections for governor, lieutenant governor, state senator, state representative, governor's council, secretary of state, state treasurer, state auditor, state attorney general, and United States senator and representative in Congress.		
19-04	Did not collect signatures	Initiative Petition for a Law Relative to the Humane Treatment of the Disabled	This proposed law would prohibit state-funded, state-operated, or state-licensed facilities from administering painful punishment or behavioral modification procedures to persons with disabilities.		
19-05	Did not collect signatures	Initiative Petition for Law Relative to the Treatment of Persons with Disabilities	This proposed law would prohibit the use of electric shocks on any person with a physical, intellectual, or developmental disability for punishment, behavior modification, or for any reason other than medical resuscitation or for electroconvulsive treatment to which the person has consented. This prohibition would not apply to authorized law enforcement officers engaged in law enforcement duties.		
19-07	Not certified for circulation	Initiative Petition Relative to Corporate Rights and Political Spending	The first section of the proposed amendment declares that corporations are not people and may be regulated. The second section provides that the Legislature may regulate and set reasonable limits on political contributions and expenditures		
19-08	Did not collect signatures	Initiative Petition Relative to Political Spending by Non-Residents of Massachusetts	This proposed law would limit monetary contributions that state, county, or local political candidates or ballot question committees could accept from political action committees organized outside Massachusetts or from individuals who reside outside Massachusetts.		
19-09	Did not collect signatures	Whale Safe Fishing Act	This proposed law would ban the use of commercial fishing gear likely to entangle whales and sea turtles.		
19-12	Not Certified for circulation	Initiative Petition for a Law Relative to Primary Elections	Replacing the current system of party primaries with an open "voter nomination" primary, under which all candidates from all parties would appear on a single primary ballot and voters could choose any candidate. The top two vote-getters, regardless of party affiliation, would advance to the general election.		
19-11	Did not collect signatures	An Act Establishing Adequate Funding for Residents of Massachusetts Nursing Homes	Update the Medicaid reimbursement for nursing homes, including updating the base year for average costs.		
19-13	Not certified for circulation	Initiative Petition for a Law Relative to Reducing the Risks of Technology	Proposes a law that would create the Reducing Risks of Technology Commission (RRTC). The RRTC would be charged with drafting legislation to address a broad array of topics pertaining to technology.		
19-14	Did not collect signatures	Initiative Petition for a Law Relative to the Sale of Beer and Wine by Food Stores	Increase the number of food stores able to sell alcoholic beverages and lift the cap of number of licenses to sell alcohol a person may have.		
19-15	Did not collect signatures	Petition for a Law to Prevent Massachusetts From Becoming a Sanctuary State	This proposed law would provide new authority to state and local law enforcement officers to detain someone who would otherwise be released in order to transfer custody to federal immigration officials, if such federal officials assert that the person is subject to deportation and if specific facts indicate that the person poses a threat to public safety.		
19-16	Did not collect signatures	Petition for a Law to Limit Taxpayer-Funded Payouts to Employees Leaving State Service	This proposed law would limit to 1,000 hours the credits for unused sick leave that employees of state agencies, state authorities, and public institutions of higher education could accrue.		

== Polling ==
Massachusetts Question 1

Poll source	Date(s) administered	Sample size (Note: Key: A – all adults RV – registered voters LV – likely voters V – unclear)	Margin of error	Yes (for the amendment)	No (against the amendment)	Other	Undecided
YouGov/UMass Amherst	October 14–21, 2020	713 (LV)	–	75%	15%	–	11%
Ipsos/Spectrum News	October 7–15, 2020	1,001 (A)	± 3.5%	58%	22%	–	20%
MassInc./WBUR	August 6–9, 2020	501 (LV)	± 4.4%	57%	31%	0% (Note: "Refused" with 0%)	12%

Massachusetts Question 2

Poll source	Date(s) administered	Sample size	Cohort	Margin of error	Yes (for the initiative)	No (against the initiative)	Other	Undecided
YouGov/UMass Amherst	October 14–21, 2020	713 (LV)	All	± 4.5%	48%	43%	–	9%
Ipsos/Spectrum News	October 7–15, 2020	1,001 (A)	All	± 3.5%	45%	34%	–	21%
MassInc./WBUR	August 6–9, 2020	501 (LV)	All	± 4.4%	36%	36%	1% (Note: "Refused" with 1%)	27%
MassInc./WBUR	August 6–9, 2020	323 (LV)	Respondents who say they understand RCV very well or somewhat well	± 5.6%	48%	35%	2% (Note: "Refused" with 2%)	15%
MassInc./WBUR	August 6–9, 2020	161 (LV)	Respondents who say they do not understand RCV very well or do not understand it at all	± 7.9%	14%	38%	0%	48%

== See also ==
- 2019–2020 Massachusetts legislature
- 2020 Massachusetts general election
- Direct Democracy in Massachusetts

== Notes ==
Preceded by 2018	Massachusetts Ballot Measures; 2020	Succeeded by 2022
