= 2024 Massachusetts Question 1 =

- November 5, 2024
- A Law Expressly Authorizing the Auditor to Audit the Legislature

Results
Choice	Votes	%
Yes	1,720,406	71.62%
No	681,703	28.38%
Total votes	2,402,109	100.00%

2024 Massachusetts Question 1 was an initiative petition which authorized the Massachusetts State Auditor to conduct an audit of the state legislature. The measure passed overwhelmingly, but state auditor Diana DiZoglio faced difficulties implementing the new law, which the state legislature maintained was unconstitutional. Andrea Campbell, the attorney general of Massachusetts, declined to represent DiZoglio in her lawsuit against leaders of the legislature.

== Background ==
Diana DiZoglio was first elected state auditor in 2022, defeating Republican Anthony Amore. During her campaign, she promised to conduct an audit of the state legislature. The legislature has always maintained that an audit of the legislature by the auditor, a member of the executive branch, would be an unconstitutional violation of separation of powers. When DiZoglio attempted to conduct an audit of the legislature in 2023, attorney general Andrea Campbell ruled that an audit could not be conducted without the consent of the legislature.

With the legislature and attorney general declining to allow DiZoglio to conduct an audit, DiZoglio shifted her tactics. She helped put Question 1 on the ballot, helping with signature gathering and heavily campaigning in favor of the measure. The measure would specifically enshrine the ability of the auditor to audit the state legislature into law.

== Impact ==
Question 1 gave the state auditor explicit legal permission to conduct an audit of the state legislature. However, auditor Diana DiZoglio faced difficulties implementing the new law, kicking off a years-long battle with her fellow Democrats over the issue of the audit. DiZoglio took a combative approach, directly criticizing legislative leaders and other figures she saw as insufficiently supportive of the audit. The Boston Globe stated that she "may be the most polarizing political figure in the Massachusetts Democratic Party." The fight over the audit elevated the usually obscure office of the state auditor to a prominent place in the public eye.

The state legislature consistently resisted any potential audit from DiZoglio in the aftermath of the passage of Question 1. House leaders hired an attorney to protect themselves against potential legal action from DiZoglio and a Senate subcommittee was convened to respond to the auditor.

DiZoglio eventually resorted to legal action against legislative leaders. However, she faced new hurdles in getting legal representation. As a constitutional officer, she could only be represented in an official capacity by the attorney general's office. However, DiZoglio and attorney general Andrea Campbell engaged in a public feud, accusing each other in public interviews of preventing the process from moving forward. Campbell alleged that DiZoglio had not provided necessary information while DiZoglio accused Campbell of "public corruption". DiZoglio retained a law firm as her office explored possible legal action with funding from Michael Minogue, a Republican candidate for governor.

In March 2026, the Supreme Judicial Court (SJC) rejected a request from DiZoglio that the court appoint an outside lawyer to represent her, concurring with Campbell's view that only the attorney general could represent her.

In May 2026, after the SJC issued a deadline for Campbell to make a final decision on whether or not to represent DiZoglio against legislative leaders, Campbell agreed to allow DiZoglio to be represented by outside counsel. Shannon Liss-Riordan, who had run against Campbell in the 2022 Democratic primary, agreed to represent DiZoglio pro bono. Campbell also decided to appoint a special assistant attorney general to represent the state legislature.

Faced with continued legal difficulties, DiZoglio decided to organize a drive to place a new ballot question on the ballot in 2026. The CommonWealth Beacon stated that DiZoglio had "essentially taken over as leader" of the campaign that would become 2026 Massachusetts Question 1. DiZoglio donated $150,000 from her campaign account to the new effort, which would place gubernatorial and legislative records under the state's public records law. One of DiZoglio's goals in supporting this new campaign was to make moot the legal argument that the auditor accessing legislative records would be a violation of separation of powers, since the records DiZoglio seeks would from then on be publicly accessible.

== Endorsements ==
Yes

Statewide officials

- Diana DiZoglio, state auditor of Massachusetts (2023–present) (Democratic)

State legislators

- Mike Connolly, state representative from the 26th Middlesex district (2017–present) (Democratic)

Organizations

- Our Revolution Massachusetts

Newspapers

- The Boston Globe
- Boston Herald
No

Statewide officials

- Suzanne Bump, former state auditor of Massachusetts (2011–2023) (Democratic)

State legislators

- Aaron Michlewitz, chair of the Massachusetts House Ways and Means Committee (2019–present) and state representative from the 3rd Suffolk district (2009–present) (Democratic)

== Polling ==
Poll source	Date(s) administered	Sample size (Note: Key: A – all adults RV – registered voters LV – likely voters V – unclear)	Margin of error	Yes (for the amendment)	No (against the amendment)	Undecided
UNH	November 3, 2024	750 (LV)	± 3.5%	65%	19%	15%
Emerson College/WHDH (TV)	October 24–26, 2024	1,000 (LV)	± 3.0%	67%	14%	20%
UMass Amherst/WCVB	October 3–10, 2024	700 (A)	± 4.8%	63%	11%	26%
WBUR/CommonWealth Beacon	September 12–18, 2024	800 (LV)	-	70%	8%	22%

== Results ==
2024 Massachusetts Question 1
Choice	Votes	%
For	1,720,406	71.62
Against	681,703	28.38
Total	2,402,109	100.00
Source: Massachusetts Secretary of the Commonwealth

== See also ==
- Direct democracy in Massachusetts
- 2024 Massachusetts ballot measures
- 2026 Massachusetts ballot measures#Question 1
