= Massachusetts Right to Repair Initiative =

Massachusetts Right to Repair Initiative may refer to:

- Massachusetts Right to Repair Initiative (2012)
- Massachusetts Right to Repair Initiative (2020)
