= 2022 Massachusetts Question 1 =

- November 8, 2022
- An Amendment for an Additional Tax on Income Over One Million

Results
Choice	Votes	%
Yes	1,267,132	52.25%
No	1,158,225	47.75%
Total votes	2,425,357	100.00%

Yes
60%–70%
50%–60%
No
50%–60%

2022 Massachusetts Question 1, commonly referred to as the "Millionaires Tax" or the "Fair Share Amendment", was a proposal to amend the state constitution to create a new 4% tax on income for people earning more than $1,000,000 annually, with the new revenue to go towards infrastructure and education. The proposal narrowly passed, with 52% voting 'Yes'.

== Background ==
A similar measure was certified to be placed on the ballot for the 2018 cycle by Maura Healey, at the time the state's attorney general. However, the Supreme Judicial Court struck it from the ballot, ruling that the wording of the measure was unconstitutional as it mixed unrelated subjects.

Supporters of the 2022 measure sought to solve this issue by placing it on the ballot as a legislatively referred constitutional amendment. This type of amendment is not subject to the same rules on the mixing of subjects. The General Court approved the amendment in mid-2021, clearing the way for the measure to be successfully placed on the ballot.

== Impact ==
Question 1 created an additional 4% tax on income earned above $1 million, for the purpose of providing funds for public education, roads and bridges, and public transportation. Massachusetts also has a 5% flat income tax, creating a total tax rate of 9% on all income above $1 million. The amendment also authorized the $1 million threshold to be adjusted to match cost of living in Massachusetts, using the same method used to establish federal income brackets.

The tax took effect on January 1, 2023, two months after voters approved it. New revenue from the tax has been budgeted toward infrastructure and education, including free school lunches for K-12 students and free community college for some students.

Since taking effect, the tax has exceeded revenue projections. In its first and second fiscal years, revenue from the surtax more than doubled what state lawmakers had budgeted, generating an estimated $2.2 and $3 billion, respectively. In May 2026, Massachusetts Department of Revenue reported the tax had generated $3.1 billion in revenue, again exceeding projections, with two months yet to be counted in the fiscal year.

The tax's impact on high incomes or wealth leaving the state is disputed. Institute for Policy Studies, a progressive think tank, noted that the number of state residents with net worths exceeding $1 million and $50 million has greatly increased since the tax, but state business leagues have argued this is due to a surge in real estate values.

The People's Policy Project, a left-wing think tank, claimed that in the years following the tax there had been "no significant outmigration of the wealthy" and considered the impact of the tax on education and transit infrastructure "impressive".

The Tax Foundation, a center-right think tank, published a report ranking Massachusetts 46th in the nation for business tax climate and cited the new tax as a factor in its decline from 34th the previous year.

== Endorsements ==
Yes

U.S. senators

- Ed Markey, Massachusetts (2013–present) (Democratic)
- Elizabeth Warren, Massachusetts (2013–present) (Democratic)

Statewide officials

- Maura Healey, attorney general of Massachusetts (2015–2023) (Democratic) (Note: Healey was elected governor in the same election cycle, taking office in January 2023)

State legislators

- Karen Spilka, Senate president (2018–present) from the 2nd Middlesex and Norfolk district (2001–present) (Democratic)
- Adrian Madaro, state representative from the 1st Suffolk district (2015–present) (Democratic)
- Ron Mariano, speaker of the House (2020–present) from the 3rd Norfolk District (1991–present) (Democratic)
- Jim O'Day, state representative from the 14th Worcester district (2007–present) (Democratic)
- Jason Lewis, state senator from the 5th Middlesex district (2014–present) (Democratic)
- Benjamin Downing, former state senator from the Berkshire, Hampden, Franklin and Hampshire district (2007–2017) (Democratic)

Labor unions

- American Federation of Teachers
- Massachusetts Teachers Association
- SEIU Massachusetts State Council

Organizations

- Unitarian Universalist Massachusetts Action

Newspapers

- The Berkshire Eagle
- The Harvard Crimson
No

State legislators

- Marc Lombardo, state representative from the 22nd Middlesex district (2011–present) (Republican)
- James J. Lyons Jr., former state representative from the 18th Essex district (2011–2019) (Republican)
- Geoff Diehl, former state representative from the 7th Plymouth district (2011–2019) (Republican)

Labor unions

- Realtors Association of Massachusetts

Organizations

- Beacon Hill Institute
- Citizens for Limited Taxation
- Pioneer Institute

== Polling ==
Poll source	Date(s) administered	Sample size (Note: Key: A – all adults RV – registered voters LV – likely voters V – unclear)	Margin of error	Yes	No	Other	Undecided
UMass Amherst/WCVB	October 20–26, 2022	700 (RV)	± 4.3%	59%	33%	–	8%
UMass Lowell	October 18–25, 2022	1000 (LV)	± 4.1%	61%	34%	–	5%
Suffolk University/Boston Globe/NBC10 Boston/Telemundo	October 13–16, 2022	500 (LV)	± 4.4%	58.4%	37.4%	–	4.2%
MassINC	October 5–14, 2022	987 (LV)	± 3.2%	59%	31%	–	10%
Suffolk University/Boston Globe/NBC10 Boston/Telemundo	September 10–13, 2022	500 (LV)	± 4.4%	56.2%	35.2%	0.8% (Note: "Refused" with 0.8%)	7.8%

== Results ==
2022 Massachusetts Question 1
Choice	Votes	%
For	1,267,132	52.25
Against	1,158,225	47.75
Total	2,425,357	100.00
Source: Massachusetts Secretary of the Commonwealth

=== By county ===
County	For		Against	
County	#	%	#	%
Barnstable	53,761	47.8%	58,823	52.2%
Berkshire	32,183	67.6%	15,429	32.4%
Bristol	82,774	46.7%	94,585	53.3%
Dukes	5,322	59.0%	3,705	41.0%
Essex	138,519	49.6%	140,903	50.4%
Franklin	21,052	68.1%	9,859	31.9%
Hampden	66,168	49.3%	67,958	50.7%
Hampshire	43,042	67.7%	20,526	32.3%
Middlesex	331,283	55.8%	262,079	44.2%
Nantucket	2,131	47.2%	2,387	52.8%
Norfolk	134,679	48.5%	143,144	51.5%
Plymouth	91,819	43.8%	117,953	56.2%
Suffolk	124,409	63.8%	70,476	36.2%
Worcester	138,673	48.3%	148,496	51.7%
Total	1,267,132	52.25%	1,158,225	47.75%

== See also ==
- Direct democracy in Massachusetts
- 2022 Massachusetts ballot measures
