= 2012 Massachusetts Question 1 =

Referendum implementing right to repair laws for vehicles

Massachusetts Question 1 (2012)
- November 6, 2012
- Right to Repair Initiative

Results
Choice	Votes	%
Yes	2,332,438	85.56%
No	393,625	14.44%
Total votes	2,726,063	100.00%

Yes
90–100%
80–90%
70–80%
60–70%
50–60%
No
80–90%
50–60%

The Massachusetts "Right to Repair" Initiative (2012), also known as Question 1, appeared on the Massachusetts 2012 general election ballot as an initiated state statute. The Right to Repair proposal was to require vehicle owners and independent repair facilities in Massachusetts to have access to the same vehicle diagnostic and repair information made available to the manufacturers' Massachusetts dealers and authorized repair facilities. The initiative passed with overwhelming voter support on November 6, 2012, with 86% for and 14% against. The measure, originally filed four times with the Massachusetts Attorney General, was filed by Arthur W. Kinsman, and was assigned initiative numbers 11–17.

In early 2019 the Massachusetts Legislature submitted bills advocating change to close loopholes associated with wireless transmission of diagnostic information. Advocates supporting an update to the Massachusetts Right to Repair law have announced that the required signatures have been gathered to place Right to Repair on the November 3, 2020 ballot.

== Legislative history ==
=== 2012 measure ===
On the last day of the session, July 31, 2012, a legislative compromise was agreed to and H. 4362 passed. Despite the law going into effect, Question 1 remained on the ballot due to timing issues. Supporters and opponents of Question 1 had originally both stated that they would launch a campaign, together, to educate voters to vote "no" on the ballot measure in November, since the compromise was reached. However, The Massachusetts Right to Repair Committee decided that voters wanted the more stringent ballot initiative rather than the compromise legislation and were joined by AAA of Pioneer Valley in West Springfield and AAA of Southern New England in Providence in urging voters to vote YES on the initiative. After the ballot measure passed, the legislature passed H. 3757 to reconcile the two; this was signed by the governor on November 26, 2013.

The Summary of the measure as it appeared on the ballot reads as follows:

A YES VOTE would enact the proposed law requiring motor vehicle manufacturers to allow vehicle owners and independent repair facilities in Massachusetts to have access to the same vehicle diagnostic and repair information made available to the manufacturers' Massachusetts dealers and authorized repair facilities. A NO VOTE would make no change in existing laws.

As with any other law, the "Summary" has no legal effect; only the full text has legal effect. The full text appears here.

== Positions ==
=== Support ===
The following is information obtained from the supporting side of the measure:

- The main proponents of the measure, and the group that organized the petition drive, is the Right to Repair Coalition (2012).
- The primary goal, according to advocates, was to expand consumer choice with respect to service centers, and increase number of independent shops that have the ability to repair vehicles.
- During a legislative hearing on the measure, Ray Magliozzi, co-host of Car Talk, testified in favor of the legislation: "This legislation protects consumer choice and levels the playing field for independent repair shops. Right now, many repairers do not have access to the information and the customer pays big for that disadvantage.
- State Representative Daniel Winslow stated at the same hearing that the measure should be passed by the legislature and not sent to the ballot, stating: "This legislation is about protecting customer choice, promoting safety, and saving consumers time and money. Consumers are enduring expensive dealership costs and the legislature has the ability to bring relief now. They need to act."

=== Opponents ===
Opponents claimed repair shops could already access the data to proprietary information they need and categorized the ballot proposal as a "power grab" by after-market parts manufacturers to "seize" proprietary information.

== Aftermath ==
=== 2020 ballot measure ===
In 2019, new legislation was filed by both members of the Massachusetts House of Representatives and the State Senate to update the original law. This legislation updates the law to include wireless technology and "telematic" information. The Massachusetts Coalition for Right to Repair has re-opened and the coalition has been active with the new legislation.

The Massachusetts Right to Repair Coalition has run TV ads and a media campaign discussing the need for a change of the law.

On August 6, 2019, the Massachusetts Right to Repair Coalition filed paperwork with the Massachusetts Attorney General's office to have a question placed on the 2020 ballot to include telematics. The referendum passed with 74.97% of the vote.

== See also ==
- Massachusetts Right to Repair Initiative (2020)
- 2012 Massachusetts Ballot Measures
- Direct Democracy in Massachusetts
