= 2022 Massachusetts elections =

2022 Massachusetts general election
- November 8, 2022

Part of the 2022 United States elections

The 2022 Massachusetts general election was held on November 8, 2022, throughout Massachusetts. Primary elections were held on September 6, 2022.

The election includes:

- Federal elections for the US House of Representatives
- Statewide elections for governor, lieutenant governor, attorney general, secretary of the Commonwealth, treasurer, and auditor
- District elections for state representatives, state senators, and governor's councillors
- County elections for sheriff, district attorney, county commissioner (only in certain counties)
- Ballot questions at the state and local levels

To register to vote, Massachusetts residents had to register by October 29, 2022.

To vote by mail, registered Massachusetts voters had to request a ballot by November 1, 2022.

== Federal offices ==
=== U.S. House of Representatives ===
All of Massachusetts' nine seats in the United States House of Representatives were up for election in 2022.

All nine seats were won by the incumbent Democratic Party candidates.

2022 US House elections in Massachusetts
District	Incumbent representative	Elected	Result
1st	Richard Neal (D)	Richard Neal (D)	Democratic hold
2nd	Jim McGovern (D)	Jim McGovern (D)	Democratic hold
3rd	Lori Trahan (D)	Lori Trahan (D)	Democratic hold
4th	Jake Auchincloss (D)	Jake Auchincloss (D)	Democratic hold
5th	Katherine Clark (D)	Katherine Clark (D)	Democratic hold
6th	Seth Moulton (D)	Seth Moulton (D)	Democratic hold
7th	Ayanna Pressley (D)	Ayanna Pressley (D)	Democratic hold
8th	Stephen Lynch (D)	Stephen Lynch (D)	Democratic hold
9th	Bill Keating (D)	Bill Keating (D)	Democratic hold

== State offices ==
- Gubernatorial election
- Attorney general election
- Secretary of the Commonwealth election
- Treasurer and receiver-general election
- Governor's Council election
- State auditor election

== State legislature ==
All seats in the state legislature, the General Court, were up for election.

=== Massachusetts State Senate ===
2022 Massachusetts Senate elections
- November 8, 2022

All 40 seats in the Massachusetts Senate 21 seats needed for a majority
	Majority party	Minority party
Party	Democratic	Republican
Seats before	37	3
Seats won	37	3
Seat change	Steady	Steady

All 40 seats in the Massachusetts Senate were up for election in 2022. In the general election, the Democratic Party captured 37 seats, while the Republican Party captured three seats (no change in seat number).

=== Massachusetts State House of Representatives ===
2022 Massachusetts House of Representatives election
- November 8, 2022

All 160 seats in the Massachusetts House of Representatives 81 seats needed for a majority
	Majority party	Minority party	Third party
Party	Democratic	Republican	Independent
Seats before	130	29	1
Seats won	134	25	1
Seat change	▲4	▼4	Steady

All 160 seats in the Massachusetts House of Representatives were up for election in 2022. Democrats won 134 seats, Republicans won 25, and one was won by an independent candidate.

== Ballot measures ==
No.	Question	Status
1	Legislative Constitutional Amendment for an Additional Tax on Income Over One Million: Full text of measure; Website Link	Approved
2	Initiative Petition for a Law concerning the Regulation of Dental Insurance: Full text of measure; Website Link	Approved
3	Initiative Petition for a Law creating Expanded Availability of Licenses for the Sale of Alcoholic Beverages Full text of measure	Rejected
4	Referendum on an Existing Law on Eligibility for Driver's Licenses: Full text of measure	Approved
Cit.
