= Maine Question 2 =

Maine Question 2 may refer to:

- 2016 Maine Question 2, An Act to Establish The Fund to Advance Public Kindergarten to Grade 12 Education
- 2017 Maine Question 2, An Act To Enhance Access to Affordable Health Care
- 2025 Maine Question 2, implementing red flag laws in the state
