= 2024 Massachusetts elections =

2024 Massachusetts general election
- November 5, 2024

Part of the 2024 United States elections

The 2024 Massachusetts elections were held in Massachusetts on November 5, 2024. At the federal level, elections were held to choose 11 electors to represent the state at the Electoral College, which elects the President. In addition, elections for a seat on the U.S. Senate and for all of Massachusetts's nine seats in the U.S. House of Representatives were held. At the state level, all 40 Massachusetts Senate seats and all 160 Massachusetts House of Representatives seats were up for election. All eight members of the Governor's Council were also elected. Five ballot measures were also put up to a vote. In some counties, there were county-level races for register of deeds, clerk of courts, county commissioner, or register of probate.

Presidential primaries were held on March 5, while primaries for other races were held on September 3. The deadline to register to vote was October 26, and the deadline to request a mail-in ballot was October 29. Early in-person voting was open from October 19 to November 1. Candidate registration closed on June 4.

== Federal offices ==
=== President ===
Massachusetts had 11 electors in 2024 in accordance with the 2020 census. Massachusetts is considered a safe state for the Democratic Party, with the party expected to win in the state by a large margin. Democratic nominee Joe Biden won 66% of the vote in the state in 2020. In Massachusetts, six candidates appeared on the ballot, including Democratic nominee Kamala Harris and Republican nominee Donald Trump.

Primaries were held on March 5, 2024. Massachusetts uses semi-closed primaries, meaning independent voters can vote in a party's primary of their choice. Joe Biden and Donald Trump both won the state by large margins in the primaries. However, Joe Biden later withdrew from the race, and the Democratic convention nominated his Vice President, Kamala Harris. Harris won the general election with around 61% of the vote to Trump's 36%. However, Trump was elected president nationwide.

==== Democratic primary ====
Massachusetts Democratic primary, March 5, 2024
Candidate	Votes	%	Delegates
Joe Biden (incumbent)	533,096	80.45	91
No Preference	60,236	9.09	1
Dean Phillips	29,728	4.49	0
Marianne Williamson	20,402	3.08	0
Cenk Uygur (write-in)	82	0.01	0
Other candidates (write-in) (Note: The names of non-disclosed write-in votes were published as "All Others".)	10,135	1.53	—
Blank ballots	8,930	1.35	—
Total	662,609	100%	92

==== Republican primary ====
Massachusetts Republican primary, March 5, 2024
Candidate	Votes	Percentage	Actual delegate count		
Candidate	Votes	Percentage	Bound	Unbound	Total
Donald Trump	343,189	59.56%	40	0	40
Nikki Haley	211,440	36.69%	0	0	0
No Preference	5,717	0.99%	0	0	0
Chris Christie (withdrawn)	5,217	0.91%	0	0	0
Ron DeSantis (withdrawn)	3,981	0.69%	0	0	0
Vivek Ramaswamy (withdrawn)	1,738	0.30%	0	0	0
Other candidates	1,674	0.29%	0	0	0
Ryan Binkley (withdrawn)	619	0.11%	0	0	0
Asa Hutchinson (withdrawn)	527	0.09%	0	0	0
Blank ballots	2,148	0.37%	0	0	0
Total:	576,250	100.00%	40	0	40

==== General election ====
2024 United States presidential election in Massachusetts
Party	Candidate	Votes	%	±%
Democratic	Kamala Harris; Tim Walz	2,126,518	61.22%	▼4.38
Republican	Donald Trump; JD Vance	1,251,303	36.02%	▲3.88
Green-Rainbow	Jill Stein; Gloria Caballero-Roca (Note: Replacement for Butch Ware, Stein's vice presidential nominee.)	26,545	0.76%	▲0.25
Independent	Shiva Ayyadurai; Crystal Ellis	18,418	0.53%	N/A
Libertarian	Chase Oliver; Mike ter Maat	17,735	0.51%	▼0.78
Socialism and Liberation	Claudia De la Cruz; Karina Garcia	12,889	0.37%	N/A
Write-in		20,260	0.58%	▲0.13
Total votes		3,473,668	100.00%	N/A

=== U.S. Senate ===
Elections for Massachusetts's Class 1 Senate seat were held on November 5, 2024. The incumbent was Democrat Elizabeth Warren, who ran for the third term. Warren defeated Republican attorney John Deaton in the general election. Primaries were held on September 3. Warren won the Democratic primary unopposed, while Deaton won the Republican primary with 65% of the vote against two other candidates.

==== General election ====
2024 United States Senate election in Massachusetts
Party	Candidate	Votes	%	±%
Democratic	Elizabeth Warren (incumbent)	2,041,668	59.81%	−0.53
Republican	John Deaton	1,365,440	40.00%	+3.83
Write-in		6,221	0.18%	+0.08
Total votes		3,413,329	100.00%	N/A
Democratic hold				

=== U.S. House of Representatives ===
Elections for Massachusetts's nine seats in the House of Representatives were held on November 5, 2024. Democrats won all nine seats, with all incumbents being re-elected. Only two seats were contested by the Republican Party. Two other seats were contested by independent candidates. Primaries were held on September 3.

==== General elections ====
District		Incumbent				Candidates
Location	2022 PVI	Member	Party	First elected	Status	Candidates
Massachusetts 1	D+9	Richard Neal	Democratic	1988	Incumbent re-elected.	✓ Richard Neal (Democratic) 62.6%; Nadia Milleron (Independent) 37.4%
Massachusetts 2	D+13	Jim McGovern	Democratic	1996	Incumbent re-elected.	✓ Jim McGovern (Democratic) 68.8%; Cornelius Shea (Independent) 31.2%
Massachusetts 3	D+11	Lori Trahan	Democratic	2018	Incumbent re-elected.	✓ Lori Trahan (Democratic) 100%
Massachusetts 4	D+12	Jake Auchincloss	Democratic	2020	Incumbent re-elected.	✓ Jake Auchincloss (Democratic) 100%
Massachusetts 5	D+23	Katherine Clark	Democratic	2013 (special)	Incumbent re-elected.	✓ Katherine Clark (Democratic) 100%
Massachusetts 6	D+11	Seth Moulton	Democratic	2014	Incumbent re-elected.	✓ Seth Moulton (Democratic) 100%
Massachusetts 7	D+35	Ayanna Pressley	Democratic	2018	Incumbent re-elected.	✓ Ayanna Pressley (Democratic) 100%
Massachusetts 8	D+15	Stephen Lynch	Democratic	2001 (special)	Incumbent re-elected.	✓ Stephen Lynch (Democratic) 70.5%; Robert Burke (Republican) 29.5%
Massachusetts 9	D+6	Bill Keating	Democratic	2010	Incumbent re-elected.	✓ Bill Keating (Democratic) 56.5%; Dan Sullivan (Republican) 43.5%

== State elections ==
=== Massachusetts Senate ===
Elections for the upper house of the Massachusetts General Court were held on November 5, 2024. All 40 Senate seats were up for election. Democrats lost one seat but held their supermajority in the chamber, while Republicans gained one seat. Republicans also gained an additional seat in a 2023 special election.

==== 2023 Worcester and Hampshire special election ====
General election results
Party	Candidate	Votes	%
Republican	Peter J. Durant	12,646	54.53%
Democratic	Jonathan D. Zlotnik	10,546	45.47%
Total votes		23,192	100.00%
Republican gain from Democratic			

==== Results summary ====
Affiliation	Party (Shading indicates majority caucus)		Total	
Affiliation	Democratic	Republican	Total	Vacant
Last election (2022)	37	3	40	0
This election (2024)	35	5	40	0
Percentage of seats	87.5%	12.5%		
Change from last election	▼2	▲2		

=== Massachusetts House of Representatives ===
Elections for the lower house of the Massachusetts General Court were held on November 5, 2024. All 160 House seats were up for election. Both parties flipped two seats from the other party, leaving the partisan makeup of the chamber the same. Democrats won 134 seats, keeping their supermajority, while the Republicans won 25 seats and the sole independent won re-election.

Three special elections were held before the election. Two seats were held by the Democratic Party and one seat was held by the Republican Party. No seats changed hands in the special elections.

==== Results summary ====
Affiliation	Party (Shading indicates majority caucus)			Total	
Affiliation	Democratic	Unenrolled	Republican	Total	Vacant
Last election (2022)	134	1	25	160	0
This election (2024)	134	1	25	160	0
Percentage of seats	83.8%	0.6%	15.6%		
Change from last election	Steady	Steady	Steady		

=== Massachusetts Governor's Council ===
Elections for the Massachusetts Governor's Council were held on November 5, 2024. The Governor's Council is tasked with confirming gubernatorial judicial nominations and nominations for various boards. The Democratic Party won all eight seats on the Council, as they had in 2022.

==== Results summary ====
Affiliation	Party (Shading indicates majority)		Total	
Affiliation	Democratic	Republican	Total	Vacant
Last election (2022)	8	0	8	0
This election (2024)	8	0	8	0
Percentage of seats	100%	0%		
Change from last election	Steady	Steady		

=== Ballot measures ===
Five ballot measures were put forward to voters on November 5, 2024. Question one was a measure to specifically allow the State Auditor to audit the legislature, which passed. Question two was a proposal to eliminate MCAS as a high school graduation requirement, which passed. Question three was a proposed change to allow rideshare drivers to form unions, which also passed. Question four would have legalized psychedelic drugs under certain circumstances. However, this measure failed. Question five would have raised the minimum wage for tipped workers to match the minimum wage for all other workers. This measure also failed.

In addition to the five statewide questions, county and local questions were on the ballot in certain areas. Two non-binding public policy questions were asked in certain State House districts. One, put forward in 11 districts, asked voters whether or not they supported single-payer healthcare. It passed in all 11 districts, meaning the State Representatives in those districts were instructed to vote in favor of hypothetical future legislation. Another, asked only in the 4th Barnstable district, would have instructed the State Representative to support the proposed SouthCoast offshore wind farm. This measure failed.

==== Results summary ====
No.	Question	Status
1	Initiative Petition for a Law Expressly Authorizing the Auditor to Audit the Legislature Full text of measure	Approved
2	Initiative Petition for a Law to Remove MCAS Performance as a Condition for H.S. Graduation: Full text of measure; Website Link	Approved
3	Initiative Petition for An Act Giving Transportation Network Drivers the Option to Form a Union and Bargain Collectively: Full text of measure; Website Link	Approved
4	Initiative Petition for a Law Relative to the Regulation and Taxation of Natural Psychedelics Full text of measure	Rejected
5	Initiative Petition for a Law Requiring the Full Minimum Wage for Tipped Workers with Tips on Top Full text of measure	Rejected
Cit.
