= Motor Vehicle Owners' Right to Repair Act =

Proposed law

The Motor Vehicle Owners' Right to Repair Act, sometimes also referred to as Right to Repair, is a name for several related proposed bills in the United States Congress and several state legislatures which would require automobile manufacturers to provide the same information to independent repair shops as they do for dealer shops.

Versions of the bill generally have been supported by independent repair and after-market associations and generally opposed by auto manufacturers and dealerships. It was first considered at the federal level in 2001, but no provisions were adopted until the Massachusetts legislature enacted Right to Repair bill H. 4362 on July 31, 2012. This law was passed in advance of a binding ballot initiative referendum which appeared on Massachusetts's statewide ballot also on November 6. The measure passed with 86% voter support. Because there were now two different laws in effect, the Massachusetts legislature enacted a bill, H. 3757 to reconcile the two laws. That bill was signed into law on November 26, 2013. Early in 2014, the Automotive Aftermarket Industry Association, Coalition for Auto Repair Equality, Alliance of Automobile Manufacturers, and the Association for Global Automakers signed a memorandum of understanding that is based on the Massachusetts law and which would commit the vehicle manufacturers to meet the requirements of the Massachusetts law in all fifty states.

In February 2019, the Right to Repair Coalition started a new public awareness ad campaign to update the Right to Repair Law which members claim is at risk because of wireless automotive technology which could limit independent repair shop's access to information which dealerships receive. Voters later passed 2020 Massachusetts Question 1 to address this problem.

== Background ==
The 1990 Clean Air Act Amendments required all vehicles built after 1994 to include on-board computer systems to monitor vehicle emissions. The bill also required automakers to provide independent repairers the same emissions service information as provided to franchised new car dealers. California further passed legislation requiring that all emissions related service information and tools be made available to independent shops. Unlike the Clean Air Act, the California bill also required the car companies to maintain web sites which contained all of their service information and which was accessible on a subscription basis to repair shops and car owners.

As automotive technology advanced, computers came to control the vital systems of every vehicle, including brakes, ignition keys, air bags, steering mechanisms and more. Repairing motor vehicles became a high-tech operation, with computer diagnostic tools replacing a mechanic's observation and experience. These developments eventually made manufacturers the "gatekeepers" of advanced information necessary to repair or supply parts to motor vehicles.

== Legislation ==
The Massachusetts Right to Repair Initiative passed with 86% voter support in the state's 2012 general election. It was expanded to include telematics by 2020 Massachusetts Question 1, though this was met with legal challenges.

The first Right to Repair bill was introduced in the United States Senate by Senator Paul Wellstone and in the House of Representatives by Joe Barton and Edolphus Towns in August 2001. The Senate bill described its goal as ending the "unfair monopoly" of car manufacturers maintaining control over repair information that could result in independent shops turning away car owners due to lack of information.

Among the states where versions of the Right to Repair Act have been introduced is New Jersey, where it was first proposed in 2006 and (A803) was overwhelmingly passed (49-22) by the State Assembly in 2008. The bill did not make it through the state Senate before the legislature adjourned. Right to repair bills also were considered in Connecticut, Illinois, New York, Oklahoma and Oregon.

== Support and opposition ==
In addition to support from the American Automobile Association, Right to Repair's primary support is from the Automotive Aftermarket Industry Association, Coalition for Auto Repair Equality (CARE) and a number of state groups representing the repair industry.

Initial opposition was from auto manufacturers who responded that the bill was unnecessary because of its work since 2000 through the National Automotive Service Task Force (NASTF), a cooperative based on a pilot program in Arizona involving sixty-three organizations, including carmakers plus auto service and equipment and tool companies.

== Debate ==
In May 2001 NASTF established a website providing reference for all technicians on obtaining service information and tools from manufacturers. In October 2001, carmakers announced their commitment to correct any remaining gaps by January 2003.

According to a letter from representatives of the ASA, Alliance of Automobile Manufacturers (AAM) and Association of International Automobile Manufacturers (AIAM), in August 2002 a voluntary agreement was reached between them for auto manufacturers to provide independent repair shops the same service and training information as franchised dealerships. Reaching a final agreement in September 2002, the Automotive Service Association, representing a number of independent repair shops, withdrew its support for the bill. CARE was not party to the agreement.

Neither AAIA nor CARE were a party to the agreement. Both groups pointed to the fact that absent legislation or a law, there was nothing to compel the vehicle manufacturers to comply with the terms of the voluntary agreement should right to repair legislative efforts disappear.

Consumer Reports has expressed skepticism about the proposed bill, noting that its analysis showed the problem affects a "minuscule 0.2 percent of auto-repair customers." Consumer Reports also noted that the ASA said the NASTF had "mostly filled the information gap." Consumer Reports also argued that releasing "understandably secret details about vehicle security, smart-key codes, and engine immobilizer drives" would be a mistake. The Highway Loss Data Institute also wrote in a letter to Rep. Bart Stupak an expansion of access to information regarding passive antitheft devices, it "would be naive to expect the security of the information to remain uncompromised."

However, an April, 2005 Consumer Reports article providing repair tips to consumers stated that "A federal bill, the Right to Repair Act, would help independents because it would require automakers to provide them with technical information they need to compete with dealers."

In a letter requested by John Dingell, ranking member of the House Energy and Commerce committee, the FTC noted of 6,786 complaints relating to auto parts and repairs it had received between January 1, 1996, and May 16, 2006, only two complaints were relevant and there were "none relating to the inability of consumers or independent auto repair shops to acquire the equipment needed to repair cars."

A 2005 survey of repair shops performed by the Tarrance Group found that 59% of respondents had problems getting access to repair information or needed tools necessary for repairs and 67% reported that they had been forced to send vehicles back to the dealer.

== Legislative history ==
Congress	Short title	Bill number(s)	Date introduced	Sponsor(s)	# of cosponsors	Latest status
107th Congress	Motor Vehicle Owners' Right to Repair Act of 2001	H.R. 2735	August 2, 2001	Joe Barton (R-TX)	53	Died in committee
107th Congress	Motor Vehicle Owners' Right to Repair Act of 2001	S. 2617	June 13, 2002	Paul Wellstone (D-MN)	1	Died in committee
108th Congress	Motor Vehicle Owners' Right to Repair Act of 2003	H.R. 2735	July 15, 2003	Joe Barton (R-TX)	117	Died in committee
108th Congress	Motor Vehicle Owners' Right to Repair Act of 2003	S. 2138	February 26, 2004	Lindsey Graham (R-SC)	10	Died in committee
109th Congress	Motor Vehicle Owners' Right to Repair Act of 2005	H.R. 2048	May 3, 2005	Joe Barton (R-TX)	98	Died in committee
110th Congress	Motor Vehicle Owners' Right to Repair Act of 2007	H.R. 2694	June 13, 2007	Edolphus Towns (D-NY)	54	Died in committee
111th Congress	Motor Vehicle Owners' Right to Repair Act of 2009	H.R. 2057	April 22, 2009	Edolphus Towns (D-NY)	73	Died in committee
111th Congress	Motor Vehicle Owners' Right to Repair Act of 2010	S. 3181	March 25, 2010	Barbara Boxer (D-CA)	6	Died in committee
112th Congress	Motor Vehicle Owners' Right to Repair Act of 2011	H.R. 2057	April 8, 2011	Edolphus Towns (D-NY)	52	Died in committee

== See also ==
- Magnuson–Moss Warranty Act
- Specialty Equipment Market Association
