= 2022 Massachusetts ballot measures =

2022 referendums

2022 Massachusetts referendums
- November 8, 2022
- Questions: 1. An Amendment for an Additional Tax on Income Over One Million; 2. A Law concerning the Regulation of Dental Insurance; 3. A Law creating Expanded Availability of Licenses for the Sale of Alcoholic Beverages; 4. Referendum on an Existing Law on Eligibility for Driver's Licenses

Question 1: Increases Taxes on Income Over One Million
Yes	52.3%
No	47.7%
Proposal approved

Question 2: Regulates Dental Insurance
Yes	71.6%
No	28.4%
Proposal approved

Question 3: Expands Availability of Alcohol Sale Licenses
Yes	44.9%
No	55.1%
Proposal rejected

Question 4: Allows Undocumented Immigrants to hold Driver's Licenses
Yes	53.9%
No	46.1%
Proposal approved

Four ballot measures were on the ballot during the 2022 Massachusetts elections which were held on November 8, 2022. In addition to the 4 which were certified, 24 measures failed to meet the requirements to be on the ballot.

In Massachusetts, a constitutional amendment or proposed law can be placed on the ballot by popular petition. If a petition collects 74,574 signatures, it will be considered by the General Court. If the General Court does not pass the proposal, the petitioners can have their proposal placed on the ballot at the next general election if they collect 12,429 more signatures. In addition, a law passed by the General Court can be put to a veto referendum, in which the law must be passed by popular vote. In 2022, 1 constitutional amendment, 2 proposed laws, and 1 veto referendum were placed on the ballot.

== Measures on the ballot ==
No.	Question	Status
1	Legislative Constitutional Amendment for an Additional Tax on Income Over One Million: Full text of measure; Website Link	Approved
2	Initiative Petition for a Law concerning the Regulation of Dental Insurance: Full text of measure; Website Link	Approved
3	Initiative Petition for a Law creating Expanded Availability of Licenses for the Sale of Alcoholic Beverages Full text of measure	Rejected
4	Referendum on an Existing Law on Eligibility for Driver's Licenses: Full text of measure	Approved
Cit.

== Question 1 ==
Question 1, sometimes called the "Millionaires Tax" and the "Fair Share Amendment" by its supporters, was a proposal to amend the state constitution to create a new 4% tax on income for people earning more than $1,000,000 annually, with the new revenue to go towards infrastructure and education. It would be a constitutional amendment rather than a law, making it difficult to change in the future. This proposal passed.

=== Results ===
2022 Massachusetts Question 1 election results by precinct

Measure 1
Choice	Votes	%
For	1,267,132	52.25
Against	1,158,225	47.75
Total	2,425,357	100.00

== Question 2 ==
Question 2 was a proposal to require dental insurance companies to spend 83% of their revenues from insurance premiums on patient care. This proposal passed.

2022 Massachusetts Question 2 election results by precinct

=== Polling ===
Poll source	Date(s) administered	Sample size (Note: Key: A – all adults RV – registered voters LV – likely voters V – unclear)	Margin of error	Yes (for the proposed law)	No (against the proposed law)	Undecided
UMass Amherst/WCVB	October 20–26, 2022	700 (RV)	± 4.3%	68%	20%	12%
UMass Lowell	October 18–25, 2022	1000 (LV)	± 4.1%	63%	21%	16%

=== Results ===
Measure 2
Choice	Votes	%
For	1,720,406	71.62
Against	681,703	28.38
Total	2,402,109	100.00

== Question 3 ==
Question 3 was a proposal to change the laws regarding liquor licensing. It would have allowed stores to sell alcohol in more locations, while making it more difficult for them to obtain liquor licenses and increasing penalties for violations of liquor laws by stores. This proposal failed.

2022 Massachusetts Question 3 election results by precinct

=== Polling ===
Poll source	Date(s) administered	Sample size	Margin of error	Yes (for the amendment)	No (against the amendment)	Undecided
UMass Amherst/WCVB	October 20–26, 2022	700 (RV)	± 4.3%	39%	38%	23%
UMass Lowell	October 18–25, 2022	1000 (LV)	± 4.1%	45%	40%	15%

=== Results ===
Measure 3
Choice	Votes	%
For	1,070,761	44.88
Against	1,314,972	55.12
Total	2,385,733	100.00

== Question 4 ==
Question 4 was a veto referendum on a law passed by the Massachusetts legislature which allowed undocumented immigrants to hold driver's licenses. Republican Governor Baker vetoed the law, but his veto was then overridden by the legislature. The Republican Party campaigned to put the law to a veto referendum, and it was placed on the ballot. The measure passed, meaning the law was kept in place.

2022 Massachusetts Question 4 election results by precinct

=== Polling ===
Poll source	Date(s) administered	Sample size	Margin of error	Yes (uphold the law)	No (overturn the law)	Other	Undecided
UMass Amherst/WCVB	October 20–26, 2022	700 (RV)	± 4.3%	51%	39%	–	10%
UMass Lowell	October 18–25, 2022	1000 (LV)	± 4.1%	53%	39%	–	9%
Suffolk University/Boston Globe/NBC10 Boston/Telemundo	October 13–16, 2022	500 (LV)	± 4.4%	56.4%	39.2%	0.2% (Note: "Refused" with 0.2%)	4.2%
MassINC	October 5–14, 2022	987 (LV)	± 3.2%	49%	37%	–	14%
Suffolk University/Boston Globe/NBC10 Boston/Telemundo	September 10–13, 2022	500 (LV)	± 4.4%	49.2%	38.4%	1.0% (Note: "Refused" with 1%)	11.4%

=== Results ===
Measure 4
Choice	Votes	%
For	1,299,960	53.93
Against	1,110,386	46.07
Total	2,410,346	100.00

== Notes ==
Preceded by 2020	Massachusetts Ballot Measures; 2022	Succeeded by 2024
