= Daniel Darris-O'Connor =

American politician

Member-elect of the Massachusetts House of Representatives from the 22nd Middlesex district
- Assuming office January 6, 2027
- Succeeding: Marc Lombardo

Personal details
- Born: January 5, 2007 (age 19)
- Party: Democratic
- Education: University of Massachusetts Lowell
- Occupation: Politician

Daniel Darris-O'Connor (born January 5, 2007) is an American politician who is the representative-elect of the 22nd Middlesex district of the Massachusetts House of Representatives, succeeding Marc Lombardo. A member of the Democratic Party, Darris-O'Connor is expected to become one of the youngest members of the Massachusetts House of Representatives when inaugurated at 20 years old.

Darris-O'Connor was an 18-year-old high school student when he was elected to the select board of Billerica, Massachusetts. He is believed to be the youngest select board member in Billerica's history.

== Personal life ==
At the time Darris-O'Connor was elected to the select board of Billerica, he expressed a desire to have a career as a pilot. Darris-O'Connor served as class president during his time at Billerica Memorial High School. When the COVID-19 pandemic hit, he was in the seventh grade and told CNN affiliate WCVB, "...I really became... laser focused on... the COVID pandemic and... the political implications of that. And it was really an eye opener at the time that... the world isn't perfect. And we need new leaders in our government that are actually going to... fix things and make things better."
