= 2028 Massachusetts elections =

Elections in the US state

- November 7, 2028

Elections will be held in the U.S. state of Massachusetts in 2028 as part of the 2028 United States elections. At the federal level, elections will be held for for each of Massachusetts' 9 U.S. House of Representative districts. At the state level, elections will be held for the (Senate and House of Representatives) in the Massachusetts General Court.

== U.S. House of Representatives ==
Elections for Massachusetts's nine seats in the House of Representatives will be held. In 2026, Democrats won all nine seats.

District		Incumbent				Candidates
Location	2026 PVI	Member	Party	First elected	Results	Candidates
Massachusetts 1	D+8	Richard Neal	Democratic	1988	Incumbent re-elected.	✓ Richard Neal (Democratic); Nadia Milleron (Independent)
Massachusetts 2	D+13	Jim McGovern	Democratic	1996	Incumbent re-elected.	✓ Jim McGovern (Democratic)
Massachusetts 3	D+11	Lori Trahan	Democratic	2018	Incumbent re-elected.	✓ Lori Trahan (Democratic); Gary Grossi (Republican); Dennis Conlon (Independent)
Massachusetts 4	D+11	Jake Auchincloss	Democratic	2020	Incumbent re-elected.	✓ Jake Auchincloss (Democratic); Thomas Stalcup (Republican)
Massachusetts 5	D+24	Katherine Clark	Democratic	2013 (special)	Incumbent re-elected.	✓ Katherine Clark (Democratic)
Massachusetts 6	D+11	Seth Moulton	Democratic	2014	Incumbent retired to run for U.S. Senate. Democratic hold.	✓ Dan Koh (Democratic); Micah Jones (Republican)
Massachusetts 7	D+34	Ayanna Pressley	Democratic	2018	Incumbent re-elected.	✓ Ayanna Pressley (Democratic)
Massachusetts 8	D+15	Stephen Lynch	Democratic	2001 (special)	Incumbent re-elected.	✓ Stephen Lynch (Democratic); Robert Burke (Republican); Rasheed Walters (Independent)
Massachusetts 9	D+6	Bill Keating	Democratic	2010	Incumbent re-elected.	✓ Bill Keating (Democratic); Tyler MacAllister (Republican)

== General Court ==
=== Massachusetts Senate ===
Elections for the upper house of the Massachusetts General Court will be held. All 40 Senate seats will be up for election. Democrats retained their supermajority in the chamber in 2026.

=== Massachusetts House of Representatives ===
Elections for the lower house of the Massachusetts General Court will be held. All 160 House of Representatives seats will be up for election. Democrats retained their supermajority in the chamber in 2026.

== Ballot questions ==
There will be a number of ballot questions for voters to decide. They include an attempt to repeal a law that allows abortion up until the moment of birth and may include restrictions on data centers, restrictions on legislative stipends, and an attempt to impose the country's most restrictive rent control law.

=== Abortion ===
In 2026, the General Court passed a law (Note: Chapter 188 of the Acts of 2026) which eliminated previous limits on abortions performed after the 24th week of pregnancy, allowing abortions up until the moment of birth. Previously, most abortions in Massachusetts had to be performed before the 24th week of pregnancy. Opponents collected nearly 100,000 signatures to repeal the law, nearly double the 49,716 required to suspend the law until voters could decide if it should be repealed in 2028.

In November 2026, Governor Maura Healy appended an emergency preamble to the law which caused the law to go into effect immediately, preventing it from being suspended, which would normally happen when a repeal campaign meets the signature threshold. Two years prior, Healey used the same power to immediately implement a gun control law, which was subsequently passed by voters in 2026.

=== Data center restrictions ===
An initiative to restrict the construction and expansion of data centers may be on the ballot. In November 2026, the Committee to Restrict Data Centers filed paperwork to launch a campaign to place the measure on the ballot.

The new proposed requirements and restrictions include a requirement for new projects to receive support of 2/3rds of voters in effected towns, a requirement that electricity providers agree not to shift the costs on other customers, and a requirement that new projects use exclusively renewable energy. It would restrict non-disclosure agreements and water use. State senator John Velis supported the campaign and organizers stated that one of the goals of the campaign was to prompt legislative action.

=== Legislative stipend reform ===
An initiative to reform how legislative stipends are given out was certified to be on the 2026 ballot. In Massachusetts, the base pay for all members of the state legislature earn a base pay of around $82,000. However, legislative leaders, such as committee chairs, vice chairs, and leaders of both houses earn significantly more thanks to legislative stipends paid to lawmakers to compensate them for their additional responsibilities. The proposed ballot measure sought to reduce this excess pay, with organizers claiming that the current system allows leadership to reward loyalty by paying their appointed committee chairs significantly more than regular legislators.

Initiative petitions in Massachusetts can only concern either laws or constitutional amendments, and the Supreme Judicial Court found in an advisory opinion that the stipend proposal concerned the internal rules of the legislature. The opinion did not immediately strike it from the ballot; it was essentially a recommendation that the attorney general should not allow the measure to move forward. In May, the attorney general's office sent a letter to the secretary of state which declared that the measure could not legally be placed on the ballot. The secretary of state's office informed petition organizers that they would no longer be able to collect signatures. Organizers vowed to place a similar measure on the ballot in 2028.

=== Rent control ===
A ballot proposal to re-institute rent control was proposed for the 2026 Massachusetts ballot. If adopted, it would have become the strictest rent control law in the country. Unlike the previous version of rent control, in which individual cities and towns could choose whether or not they wanted to have rent control, this measure would cap rent increases at the rate of inflation, or 5% a year, whichever is lower, across the entire Commonwealth.

On June 23, 2026, the Supreme Judicial Court disallowed the question from appearing on the ballot. The Court said the exemption in the proposed law for religious institutions violated the Massachusetts Constitution because "to enforce the proposed law, the exemption would require the government to determine if a facility is ‘operated solely for... religious... purposes,’ and then make an enforcement decision based on the facility's religious purpose (or lack thereof)". Supporters pledged to bring it back at a future election.
