= Marc Lombardo =

American politician

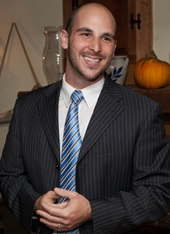

Member of the Massachusetts House of Representatives from the 22nd Middlesex district
- Incumbent
- Assumed office 2011
- Preceded by: William G. Greene, Jr.
- Succeeded by: Daniel Darris-O'Connor (elect)

Personal details
- Party: Republican
- Spouse: Victoria Isnor
- Education: Merrimack College
- Occupation: Software Account Executive; Politician

Marc T. Lombardo is an American politician who represents the 22nd Middlesex District in the Massachusetts House of Representatives, consisting of Billerica in Middlesex County.

He is a member of the Republican Party, and started as a member of the Board of Selectmen in Billerica, Massachusetts and a town meeting member until he was first elected to the state House in 2010. He has been a state representative ever since.

Lombardo currently serves as the ranking minority member of the Joint Committee on Advanced Information Technology, the Internet and Cybersecurity and the Joint Committee on Revenue. He also served on the House Committee on Human Resources and Employee Engagement and the Joint Committee on Election Laws.

In addition to State Representative, Lombardo works as a software account executive. He has two children, Guytano and Angelina Lombardo.

Lombardo lost re-election in 2026, being defeated by Daniel Darris-O'Connor, his Democratic challenger.

== See also ==
- 2019–2020 Massachusetts legislature
- 2021–2022 Massachusetts legislature
