= 2020 Massachusetts Question 2 =

2020 Massachusetts Ranked Choice Voting Initiative
- November 3, 2020
- Initiative Petition for a Law to Implement Ranked-Choice Voting in Elections
- Outcome: Rejected

Results
Choice	Votes	%
Yes	1,549,919	45.22%
No	1,877,447	54.78%
Valid votes	3,427,366	93.69%
Invalid or blank votes	230,639	6.31%
Total votes	3,658,005	100.00%
Registered voters/turnout	4,812,909	76%

No
80–90%
70–80%
60–70%
50–60%
Yes
90–100%
80–90%
70–80%
60–70%
50–60%
Other
Tie

Massachusetts Ranked-Choice Voting Initiative, also known as Question 2, was an initiative at the 2020 Massachusetts general election that would have changed primaries and elections in Massachusetts from plurality voting to ranked-choice voting (RCV) for all Massachusetts statewide offices, state legislative offices, federal congressional offices, and certain other offices beginning in 2022. RCV would not be extended to elections for president, county commissioner, or regional district school committee member. The initiative failed, with 54.8% of voters voting "No" and 45.2% "Yes".

If passed, Massachusetts would have become the second state to adopt ranked-choice voting for state and federal offices, following Maine's passage of Question 5 in 2016 and subsequent passage of Question 1 in June 2018. Other initiatives to enact ranked choice voting in 2020 include the Alaska Ballot Measure 2.

== Summary ==
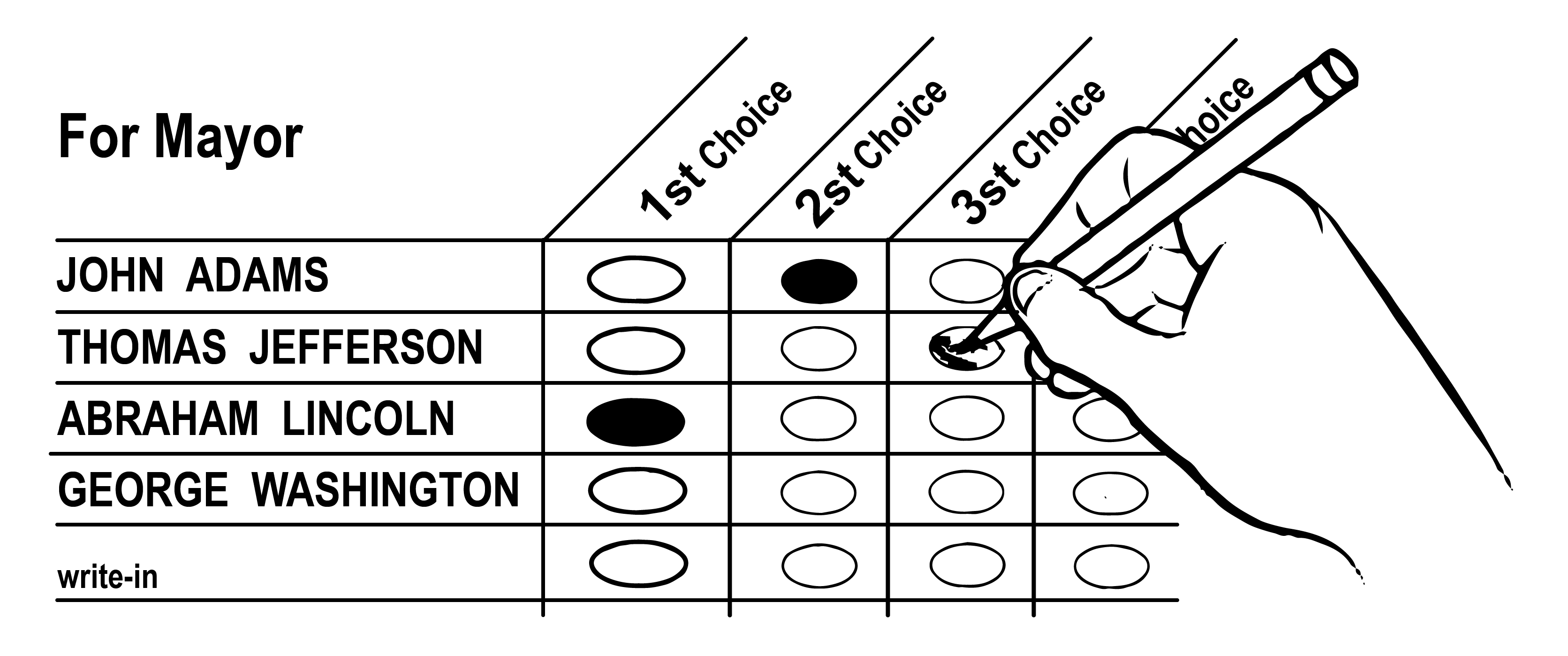
Example of a hypothetical ranked choice election

Ranked choice voting is a voting system where voters can rank multiple candidates in order of their preference and is used to ensure election of a candidate with majority support. People supporting lower performing candidates as their first preference can redistribute their vote to more viable candidates, avoiding the problems of vote splitting and spoiler candidates. Ranked choice voting is used in elections in Maine (since 2018; adopted 2016), the Australian House of Representatives (since 1918), for the Irish President (since 1938), and in numerous cities across the United States.

=== Voting Process ===
In ranked choice voting, ballots are completed by giving candidates a number ranking in order of voter preference, starting with a voter's first choice. Voters are able to rank as many candidates as they desire and to include write-in candidates on their ballots. If no candidate wins a majority of first-choice votes, then the ballot works as an instant runoff. The candidate with the fewest first-choice votes is eliminated, and that candidate's votes are redistributed to their supporters’ second choices. If no candidate has a majority after that round, then the process continues until a candidate with majority support is found.

== Endorsements ==
Voter Choice Massachusetts is the lead sponsor of the Yes on 2 campaign. In addition, it has the formal endorsements of the Democratic Party of Massachusetts, the Libertarian Party of Massachusetts, the Green-Rainbow Party, Common Cause, the League of Women Voters, RepresentUs, and many other organizations.

In a September 2020 editorial for the Boston Globe, Senator Elizabeth Warren endorsed ranked choice voting, arguing, "By requiring the winner to reach more than 50 percent of the vote, ranked-choice voting ensures the winning candidate is the one with the broadest appeal to the majority of voters. The ability to mobilize the broadest and deepest appeal across the electorate would replace the ability to target a passionate minority constituency, which may be extreme or nonrepresentative from the standpoint of most voters as the key to winning."

On October 11, the Editorial Board of The Boston Globe published Vote yes on Question 2, writing "with Question 2, Bay State voters can make our government far more representative of the will of the people."

Question 2 Endorsements

Political Parties

- Massachusetts Democratic Party
- Massachusetts Green-Rainbow Party
- Massachusetts Libertarian Party

Senators

- Ed Markey
- Elizabeth Warren

Representatives

- Lori Trahan
- Jim McGovern
- Ayanna Pressley

State Officials

- Bill Weld (Former Governor)
- Deval Patrick (Former Governor)
- William F. Galvin (Secretary of the Commonwealth)

== Polling ==
Poll source	Date(s) administered	Sample size (Note: Key: A – all adults RV – registered voters LV – likely voters V – unclear)	Cohort	Margin of error	Yes (for the initiative)	No (against the initiative)	Other	Undecided
YouGov/UMass Amherst	October 14–21, 2020	713 (LV)	All	± 4.5%	48%	43%	–	9%
Ipsos/Spectrum News	October 7–15, 2020	1,001 (A)	All	± 3.5%	45%	34%	–	21%
MassInc./WBUR	August 6–9, 2020	501 (LV)	All	± 4.4%	36%	36%	1% (Note: "Refused" with 1%)	27%
MassInc./WBUR	August 6–9, 2020	323 (LV)	Respondents who say they understand RCV very well or somewhat well	± 5.6%	48%	35%	2% (Note: "Refused" with 2%)	15%
MassInc./WBUR	August 6–9, 2020	161 (LV)	Respondents who say they do not understand RCV very well or do not understand it at all	± 7.9%	14%	38%	0%	48%

== Results ==
Question 2
Choice	Votes	%
For	1,549,919	45.22
Against	1,877,447	54.78
Total	3,427,366	100.00
Registered voters/turnout	4,812,909	76.00

== See also ==
- Massachusetts Right to Repair Initiative (2020)
- 2020 Massachusetts ballot measures
- Direct democracy in Massachusetts
- 2020 Massachusetts general election
