= 2020 Massachusetts Question 1 =

Massachusetts Question 1 (2020)
- An Initiative Law to Enhance, Update, and Protect the 2013 Motor Vehicle Right to Repair Law

Results
Choice	Votes	%
Yes	2,599,182	74.97%
No	867,674	25.03%
Valid votes	3,466,856	100.00%
Invalid or blank votes	0	0.00%
Total votes	3,466,856	100.00%

Yes
90–100%
80–90%
70–80%
60–70%
50–60%
No
60–70%
50–60%

The Massachusetts Right to Repair Initiative (2020), also known as Question 1, appeared on the Massachusetts 2020 general election ballot as an initiated state statute. It was approved by voters and the measure will update the state's right to repair laws to include electronic vehicle data. A similar Right to repair initiative (also named Question 1) appeared on the 2012 state ballot and passed with 86% of the vote.

== Summary ==
The measure extends the state's right to repair laws to include telematics systems. Telematics systems contain car data that is stored outside the vehicle, and may include information that relates to navigation, GPS, and mobile internet. It nominally requires cars sold in Massachusetts starting with the model year 2022 to equip any cars having telematics systems with a standardized open access data platform. Independent repair shops and mechanics are supposed to, with owner permission, automatically have access to the vehicle's data to use it for diagnostics and car repair. Before this law, data may only be used by manufacturer repair shops unless permission is granted.

== Implementation ==
Shortly following the statute's passing, the car manufacturers led by the Alliance for Automotive Innovation sued to stop its implementation, effectively halting the law's advancement. In February 2025, the U.S. District Court for Massachusetts dismissed the lawsuit. The following month, the Alliance for Automotive Innovation appealed the decision to the First Circuit U.S. Court of Appeals. As of August 2026 the court had not reached a decision.

In June 2023, the National Highway Traffic Safety Administration told manufacturers not to comply with the Massachusetts law, on grounds that "A malicious actor here or abroad could utilize such open access to remotely command vehicles to operate dangerously, including attacking multiple vehicles concurrently."

In response to criticism of this decision from Massachusetts parties, in August 2023, NHTSA said it would be legal for manufacturers to provide access via short-range Bluetooth connections rather than long-distance cellular modems. This reduces the risk of hacking, but makes it harder for independent shops to offer long-distance telematics services.

== Proponents ==
=== Supporting arguments ===
Supporters of the initiative argue that it would extend consumer choice in car repair sites, increasing competition and decreasing costs of car repair. Independent mechanic advocates argue that it would help support smaller and more local repair shops to be able to compete with larger manufacturer repair chains. Telematics is also a growing part of car systems, and supporters of the initiative argue it would extend right to repair to account for technological changes. Opponents say this is a misleading characterization of the auto repair market, in which owners would still have choices for finding fixes.

The proposal requires that access to information would pass through "an authorization process standardized across all makes and models and administered by an entity unaffiliated with the manufacturer." Opponents of the measure have not identified any basis to believe that this entity will not take advantage of data security techniques in designing the authorization process or to believe that data protection measures will be insufficient to protect the data and vehicle owner.

== Opponents ==
Opponents of the initiative argue that it would result in cyber security risk and possibly make vehicle data more vulnerable. Several TV ads attacking the initiative have connected the data security concerns as allowing easier stalking and concerns of sexual predators. Critics have cited these concerns as "[veering] into exaggeration and fear mongering".

== Polling ==
Poll source	Date(s) administered	Sample size (Note: Key: A – all adults RV – registered voters LV – likely voters V – unclear)	Margin of error	Yes (for the amendment)	No (against the amendment)	Other	Undecided
YouGov/UMass Amherst	October 14–21, 2020	713 (LV)	–	75%	15%	–	11%
Ipsos/Spectrum News	October 7–15, 2020	1,001 (A)	± 3.5%	58%	22%	–	20%
MassInc./WBUR	August 6–9, 2020	501 (LV)	± 4.4%	57%	31%	0% (Note: "Refused" with 0%)	12%

== Results ==
Question 1
Choice	Votes	%
For	2,599,182	74.97
Against	867,674	25.03
Total	3,466,856	100.00
Registered voters/turnout	4,812,909	76.00

== See also ==
- Massachusetts Right to Repair Initiative (2012)
- Massachusetts Ranked-Choice Voting Initiative (2020)
- Direct Democracy in Massachusetts
