= 2024 Massachusetts ballot measures =

2024 referendums

2024 Massachusetts referendums
- November 5, 2024
- Questions: 1. A Law Expressly Authorizing the Auditor to Audit the Legislature; 2. A Law to Remove MCAS Performance as a Condition for H.S. Graduation; 3. An Act Giving Transportation Network Drivers the Option to Form a Union and Bargain Collectively; 4. A Law Relative to the Regulation and Tax of Natural Psychedelics; 5. A Law Requiring the Full Minimum Wage for Tipped Workers with Tips on Top

Question 1: Allows Audits of the State Legislature
Yes	71.6%
No	28.4%
Proposal approved

Question 2: Repeals MCAS requirement for HS Graduation
Yes	59.1%
No	40.9%
Proposal approved

Question 3: Allows ride-hailing drivers to form labor unions.
Yes	54.1%
No	45.9%
Proposal approved

Question 4: Legalizes certain psychedelic substances
Yes	43.1%
No	56.9%
Proposal rejected

Question 5: Increase the minimum wage for tipped workers
Yes	35.9%
No	64.1%
Proposal rejected

Five ballot measures were on the ballot for the November 5th, 2024 general election in the state of Massachusetts. Multiple other ballot measures that were initiated by supporters did not meet requirements to appear on the ballot.

The Constitution of Massachusetts can be amended through initiative. State statutes can also be proposed through initiative. In Massachusetts, after the Attorney General determines which measure(s) will appear on the ballot after a review of their constitutionality, an official name is assigned to each question. The Secretary of the Commonwealth has discretion over the ordering of questions on the ballot.

== Measures on the ballot ==
No.	Question	Status
1	Initiative Petition for a Law Expressly Authorizing the Auditor to Audit the Legislature Full text of measure	Approved
2	Initiative Petition for a Law to Remove MCAS Performance as a Condition for H.S. Graduation: Full text of measure; Website Link	Approved
3	Initiative Petition for An Act Giving Transportation Network Drivers the Option to Form a Union and Bargain Collectively: Full text of measure; Website Link	Approved
4	Initiative Petition for a Law Relative to the Regulation and Taxation of Natural Psychedelics Full text of measure	Rejected
5	Initiative Petition for a Law Requiring the Full Minimum Wage for Tipped Workers with Tips on Top Full text of measure	Rejected
Cit.

== Question 1 ==
Question 1 was a proposal to expressly allow the state auditor to conduct an audit of the state legislature. The measure passed overwhelmingly, but the state legislature maintained that the measure was unconstitutional and a legal battle ensued.

=== Results ===
Measure 1
Choice	Votes	%
For	1,720,406	71.62
Against	681,703	28.38
Total	2,402,109	100.00

== Question 2 ==
Question 2 was a proposal to eliminate the graduation requirement that students pass MCAS exams in 10th grade. This measure would eliminate the main statewide graduation requirement and shift the responsibility for creating graduation requirements to local school districts. This measure passed.

=== Polling ===
Poll source	Date(s) administered	Sample size (Note: Key: A – all adults RV – registered voters LV – likely voters V – unclear)	Margin of error	Yes (for the amendment)	No (against the amendment)	Undecided
UNH	November 3, 2024	750 (LV)	± 3.5%	49%	43%	8%
Emerson College/WHDH (TV)	October 24–26, 2024	1,000 (LV)	± 3.0%	54%	41%	5%
UMass Amherst/WCVB	October 3–10, 2024	700 (A)	± 4.8%	53%	36%	11%
WBUR/CommonWealth Beacon	September 12–18, 2024	800 (LV)	-	51%	34%	15%

=== Results ===
Measure 2
Choice	Votes	%
For	2,004,196	59.07
Against	1,388,553	40.93
Total	3,392,749	100.00

== Question 3 ==
Question 3 would allow rideshare drivers to form a labor union. Before, there was no easy path for Uber and Lyft drivers to unionize, with Question 3 creating the ability for drivers across multiple companies to collectively bargain. This measure passed.

=== Polling ===
Poll source	Date(s) administered	Sample size	Margin of error	Yes (for the amendment)	No (against the amendment)	Undecided
UNH	November 3, 2024	750 (LV)	± 3.5%	55%	25%	20%
Emerson College/WHDH (TV)	October 24–26, 2024	1,000 (LV)	± 3.0%	57%	33%	10%
UMass Amherst/WCVB	October 3–10, 2024	700 (A)	± 4.8%	58%	27%	15%

=== Results ===
Measure 3
Choice	Votes	%
For	1,771,750	54.08
Against	1,504,674	45.92
Total	3,276,424	100.00

== Question 4 ==
Question 4 was a proposal to legalize some psychedelic drugs. Individuals would be allowed to grow these drugs to be grown, used at home, and prescribed by medical professionals. This measure failed.

=== Polling ===
Poll source	Date(s) administered	Sample size	Margin of error	Yes (for the amendment)	No (against the amendment)	Undecided
UNH	November 3, 2024	750 (LV)	± 3.5%	48%	36%	16%
Emerson College/WHDH (TV)	October 24–26, 2024	1,000 (LV)	± 3.0%	50%	44%	6%
UMass Amherst/WCVB	October 3–10, 2024	700 (A)	± 4.8%	43%	43%	14%
WBUR/CommonWealth Beacon	September 12–18, 2024	800 (LV)	-	42%	44%	14%

=== Results ===
Measure 4
Choice	Votes	%
For	1,444,797	43.16
Against	1,902,513	56.84
Total	3,347,310	100.00

== Question 5 ==
Question 5 would raise the minimum wage for tipped workers to match the minimum wage for other types of workers. At the time, the minimum wage for tipped workers in Massachusetts was $6.75 per hour compared to $15 per hour for other types of workers. However, tipped workers were already guaranteed $15, with employers expected to cover the difference if the worker did not make enough in tips to earn $15 per hour. Question 5 would require employers to pay the full $15. The measure failed amidst opposition from the restaurant industry.

=== Polling ===
Poll source	Date(s) administered	Sample size	Margin of error	Yes (for the amendment)	No (against the amendment)	Undecided
UNH	November 3, 2024	750 (LV)	± 3.5%	41%	45%	14%
Emerson College/WHDH (TV)	October 24–26, 2024	1,000 (LV)	± 3.0%	42%	51%	7%
UMass Amherst/WCVB	October 3–10, 2024	700 (A)	± 4.8%	61%	27%	13%
WBUR/CommonWealth Beacon	September 12–18, 2024	800 (LV)	-	43%	40%	16%

=== Results ===
Measure 5
Choice	Votes	%
For	1,200,966	35.87
Against	2,147,233	64.13
Total	3,348,199	100.00

== Notes ==
Preceded by 2022	Massachusetts Ballot Measures; 2024	Succeeded by 2026
