= Massachusetts AFL–CIO =

Mass AFL–CIO
- Massachusetts AFL–CIO
- Founded: 1958
- Headquarters: Boston, Massachusetts
- Location: United States
- Members: 400,000
- Key people: Chrissy Lynch, President
- Affiliations: AFL–CIO
- Website: www.massaflcio.org

Massachusetts AFL–CIO is the Massachusetts state affiliate of the American Federation of Labor–Congress of Industrial Organizations (AFL–CIO). It was founded in 1958.

The Mass AFL–CIO is the umbrella organization for more than 750 local unions and intermediate bodies, such as joint boards and district councils, whose parent international unions are affiliated with the national AFL–CIO. It is one of 51 state federations operated under a charter granted by the AFL–CIO.

The Mass AFL–CIO engages in political education, legislative action, organizing, and education and training. Among its areas of interest are: jobs, workers' compensation, workplace health and safety, unemployment insurance, collective bargaining and tax policy. The Mass AFL–CIO works with like-minded consumer, civic, religious and labor groups to achieve its goals.

The Mass AFL–CIO used to be known as the Massachusetts Federation of Labor and the Massachusetts Labor Council.
