= Nevada Question 2 =

Nevada Question 2 can refer to one of the following:

- 2002 Nevada Question 2, a voter initiative to prohibit same-sex marriage in Nevada
- Nevada Question 2 (2016), a voter initiative to legalize cannabis
- 2020 Nevada Question 2, a voter initiative to allow same-sex marriage in Nevada
