= 2014 Massachusetts Question 2 =

Referendum that would have expanded recycling deposits

Question 2
- Massachusetts Expansion of Bottle Deposits Initiative

Results
Choice	Votes	%
Yes	564,381	26.55%
No	1,561,591	73.45%
Valid votes	2,125,972	100.00%
Invalid or blank votes	0	0.00%
Total votes	2,125,972	100.00%

No
90–100%
80–90%
70–80%
60–70%
50–60%
Yes
80–90%
70–80%
60–70%
50–60%

The Massachusetts Expansion of Bottle Deposits Initiative, Question 2 was an unsuccessful initiative voted on in the Massachusetts general election held on November 4, 2014. It was one of four 2014 ballot measures put to public vote.

== Voting ==
Question 2 on the ballot, "Expanding the Beverage Container Deposit Law".

YES on the question would extend the deposit law to all nonalcoholic, noncarbonated beverages not already included (with some exceptions), as well as raise handling fees. The state would also be required to adjust the deposit amount every five years based on the consumer price index, but this amount could never fall below 5 cents.

A NO VOTE means the law will remain as is.

Response	Votes	%
No	1,561,591	71%
Yes	564,381	26%
blank	60,819	3%
