= 2016 Maine Question 2 =

Question 2: Citizen Initiative
- An Act To Establish The Fund to Advance Public Kindergarten to Grade 12 Education

Results
Choice	Votes	%
Yes	383,428	50.63%
No	373,848	49.37%
Valid votes	757,276	98.13%
Invalid or blank votes	14,432	1.87%
Total votes	771,708	100.00%
Yes
50–60%
No
50–60%

Maine Question 2, formally An Act to Establish The Fund to Advance Public Kindergarten to Grade 12 Education, was a citizen-initiated referendum question that appeared on the Maine November 8, 2016 statewide ballot. It sought to increase state aid to public schools by instituting a surcharge of 3% on Maine income taxes for those with income above $200,000 a year. As the Maine Legislature declined to enact the proposal as written, it appeared on the ballot along with elections for President of the United States, Maine's two U.S. House seats, the Legislature, and various local elections.

The question was passed by roughly 10,000 votes. The surtax created by the question was repealed as part of state budget negotiations on July 3, 2017 that added $162 million to public education funding from general revenue.

== Background ==
In 2003, Maine voters passed a referendum calling for the state to pay for 55% of the cost of operating public schools, as a way to reduce pressure on local property taxes. That percentage had never been met. To attempt to reach that target, a group called Stand Up for Students announced that it would start a petition drive to implement a 3% surcharge on Maine income taxes paid on those with incomes above $200,000 a year, estimated to be the top 2% of earners in Maine. It is estimated that such a tax surcharge would result in $110 million a year in revenue.

The petition drive was carried out by some paid signature gatherers, but was largely done by volunteers from the Maine Education Association and the Maine People's Alliance, a liberal organizing group. MEA members were offered $25 Visa gift cards for every 100 signatures they gathered. The office of Maine Secretary of State Matthew Dunlap certified that the proposal qualified for the ballot on March 2, 2016, stating that 66,849 signatures were valid.

The exact wording of the question was disputed. Secretary Dunlap proposed the wording "Do you want to establish a fund to support kindergarten through 12th grade public education by adding a three percent surcharge on Maine taxable income above $200,000?". During the required public comment period before the wording was finalized, the Governor's Office filed an objection to the proposed wording, stating that the word 'tax' or 'surtax' should be used instead of 'surcharge'. Doing so, they stated, would have been consistent with prior referendums calling for generating revenue. A Stand Up for Students spokesman called the objection an effort to confuse voters, citing tax cuts enacted by Governor Paul LePage. Dunlap had until June 24 to make a final decision, which was only possible to appeal by going to court.

Dunlap released the final wording of the question on June 23, which read as "Do you want to add a 3% tax on individual Maine taxable income above $200,000 to create a state fund that would provide direct support for student learning in kindergarten through 12th grade public education?"

== Campaign ==
The Maine State Chamber of Commerce formed a PAC called No on Question 2 on August 2, 2016. Chamber President Dana Connors said that while they support strong education funding, it should be done in a manner that does not affect the economy. He went on to state that such a tax would discourage professionals from living in Maine.

=== Notable endorsements ===
==== Supporters ====
- Maine Association of School Libraries
- Maine Children's Alliance
- Maine Education Association
- Maine Parent Teacher Association
- Maine Small Business Coalition
- Machinists (IAM) Local S7
- Maine People's Resource Center
- Maine People's Alliance
- Maine AFL–CIO
- Maine State Employees Association
- Maine Center for Economic Policy

==== Opponents ====
- John Baldacci, former Governor of Maine
- Paul LePage, Governor of Maine
- Stephen Bowen, former Commissioner of the Maine Department of Education
- Jim Rier, former Commissioner of the Maine Department of Education
- Maine Heritage Policy Center
- Maine State Chamber of Commerce
- Bangor Daily News
- MaineToday Media newspapers; Portland Press Herald, Kennebec Journal, Morning Sentinel

=== Polling ===
Date of opinion poll	Conducted by	Sample size (likely voters)	Yes	No	Undecided	Margin of Error
October 20–25, 2016	University of New Hampshire	761	57%	34%	9%	±3.6%
September 15–20, 2016	University of New Hampshire	506	60%	32%	8%	±4.3%

== Results ==
Uncertified results indicated that Question 2 passed by a margin of around 10,000 votes. Due to the closeness of the result, opponents of Question 2 filed a petition for a recount, then withdrew their petition on November 29.

Question 2 Results
County	Yes	Votes	No	Votes
Androscoggin	49.84%	28,133	50.16%	28,317
Aroostook	51.55%	18,209	48.45%	17,117
Cumberland	52.44%	91,039	47.56%	82,568
Franklin	48.69%	8,200	51.31%	8,641
Hancock	48.72%	15,831	51.28%	16,662
Kennebec	49.56%	33,211	50.44%	33,807
Knox	53.67%	12,555	46.33%	10,839
Lincoln	49.67%	10,850	50.33%	10,993
Oxford	50.49%	16,089	49.51%	15,777
Penobscot	47.10%	38,369	52.90%	43,102
Piscataquis	42.23%	3,948	57.77%	5,401
Sagadahoc	51.40%	11,313	48.60%	10,698
Somerset	46.04%	12,165	53.96%	14,258
Waldo	51.27%	11,776	48.73%	11,192
Washington	46.49%	7,759	53.51%	8,930
York	52.80%	61,137	47.20%	54,663
UOCAVA	76.31%	2,844	23.69%	883
Total	50.63%	383,428	49.37%	373,848

== Repeal ==
The creation of the surtax became a point of contention in state budget negotiations for the 2017–2018 budget, with Governor LePage and minority House Republicans opposed to any tax increases in the budget. A budget that did not eliminate the surtax passed the Republican-controlled Maine Senate, but not the House, leading to a shutdown of Maine state government at the end of the fiscal year on June 30. Three days later, negotiators agreed to, and LePage signed, a budget that eliminated the surtax but added an additional $162 million for public education to the budget.
