= 2018 Massachusetts ballot measures =

Three ballot measures were certified for the November 6, 2018, general election in the state of Massachusetts.

The Constitution of Massachusetts can be amended through initiative, and state statutes can be proposed through initiative. The first and second certified measures, "Nurse-Patient Assignment Limits" and "Advisory Commission for Amendments to the U.S. Constitution Regarding Corporate Personhood and Political Spending", were both initiated state statutes. The third measure, "Gender Identity and Anti-Discrimination", was a veto referendum.

In Massachusetts, after the state determines which measure(s) will appear on the ballot, an official name is assigned to each question. The Secretary of the Commonwealth has discretion over the ordering of questions on the ballot.

== Measures on the ballot ==
No.	Type	Initiative Title	Subject	Description	Result	Ref.
1	ISS	Nurse-Patient Assignment Limits	Healthcare	Establishes a limit on how many patients a nurse can be assigned in various healthcare settings	Rejected; 70.4%–29.6%	
2	ISS	Advisory Commission for Amendments to the U.S. Constitution Regarding Corporate Personhood and Political Spending	Definition of a corporation and federal constitutional issues	Creates a panel of citizens to propose amendments to the US Constitution about campaign finance and corporate personhood	Approved; 71.4%–28.6%	
3	VR	Gender Identity Anti-Discrimination	LGBT Issues	Referendum on a 2016 law prohibiting discrimination based on gender identity (a 'yes' vote would preserve the law, a 'no' vote would repeal it)	Approved; 67.8%–32.2%	

VR = veto referendum
ISS = initiated state statute
Vote percentages as of November 8, with 100% reporting

=== Endorsements ===
==== Question 1 ====
On October 23, 2018, The Boston Globe editorial board endorsed a 'no' vote on Question 1, saying the nursing staff ratio is wrong for Massachusetts. On October 26, the Boston Herald also advocated for a 'no' vote. Governor of Massachusetts Charlie Baker said he would vote 'no', while Mayor of Boston Marty Walsh said he would vote 'yes'. A "yes" vote was also advocated by United States Senator for Vermont Bernie Sanders.

==== Question 3 ====
A 'yes' vote on Question 3 has been "wholeheartedly" endorsed by The Boston Globe in an October 17, 2018, editorial. Actress and LGBTQ advocate Laverne Cox also advocated for a 'yes' vote.

== Measures not on the ballot ==
=== Removed question ===
A measure titled "Income Tax for Education and Transportation Amendment", which sought to create a four percent tax on incomes that exceed $1 million, to be used for education and transportation purposes, was removed after the Massachusetts Supreme Judicial Court ruled in June 2018 that the measure had been incorrectly certified by the Massachusetts Attorney General. A similar question was successfully placed on the ballot in 2022, which passed.

=== Other potential questions ===
Several additional measures received a required number of signatures by December 6, 2017, but ultimately were not added to the ballot:

- $15 Minimum Wage Initiative
- Paid Family and Medical Leave Initiative
- Sales Tax Decrease and Tax-Free Weekend Initiative

A new law enacting a majority of content from these three measures was signed into law in late June by Governor of Massachusetts Charlie Baker. Hourly minimum wage will be increased from $11 to $15 by 2023, workers will have paid medical leave of 12 to 20 weeks (depending on circumstance), and there will be an annual August sales tax holiday; the state sales tax was not decreased. Initiative organizers agreed to withdraw the associated ballot initiatives.

== See also ==
- Massachusetts ballot measures, 2016
- 2020 Massachusetts ballot measures

Preceded by -2016	Massachusetts Ballot Measures; 2018	Succeeded by 2020
