= 2020 Massachusetts elections =

2020 Massachusetts general election
- November 3, 2020

Part of the 2020 United States elections

The 2020 Massachusetts general election was held on November 3, 2020, throughout Massachusetts. Primary elections were held on September 1, 2020.

At the federal level, all nine seats in the United States House of Representatives were up for election. Also contested was the United States Senate seat held by Ed Markey.

At the state level, all seats in the Massachusetts General Court (state legislature) were up for election.

To vote by mail, registered Massachusetts voters had to request a ballot by October 30, 2020. As of early October, some 504,043 voters had requested mail ballots.

== Federal offices ==
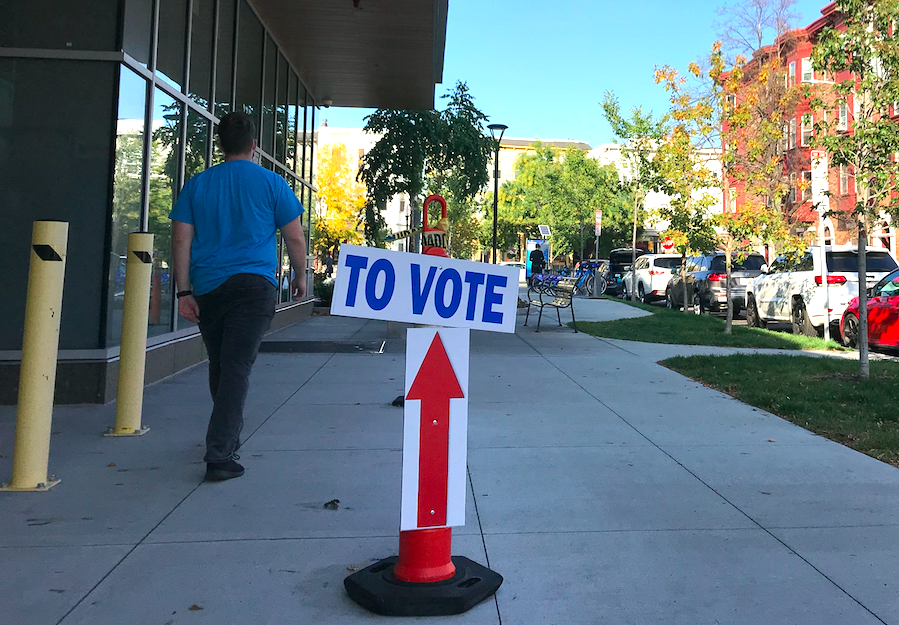
Early voting polling place in Middlesex County, Massachusetts, October 2020

== State offices ==
=== General Court ===
All seats in the state legislature, the General Court, were up for election.

== Ballot measures ==
Two ballot measures appeared on the 2020 ballot. Question 1, which passed, was concerned with access to an automobile's mechanical data. It would force all automakers starting with model year 2022 to release all relevant mechanical data for any automobile sold in the state. Question 2, which did not pass, would have established a ranked choice voting system for most state and federal primaries and general elections.

As of April 2020, four measures (19-06, 19-10, 19-11, and 19-14) had achieved the required number of initial signatures and were pending in the Massachusetts General Court. The measures could be passed by the legislature before May 5, 2020, or if that failed to happen, petitioners were required to collect an additional 13,347 signatures in support of each measure to be placed on the ballot. Due to the COVID-19 pandemic and the effects of social distancing on in-person signature collection, a lawsuit to allow for electronic signatures in support of ballot initiatives was raised with the Massachusetts Supreme Judicial Court. In late April, a court judgement to allow for electronic signatures was agreed to by Massachusetts Secretary of the Commonwealth William F. Galvin and supporters of the four measures. In early July, supporters of two of the four measures (19-06 and 19-10) announced that they had submitted a sufficient number of signatures to qualify for the ballot. Galvin certified both measures to appear on the 2020 ballot.

No.	Result	Description	Yes		No		Cit.
No.	Result	Description	Votes	%	Votes	%	Cit.
1	Yes	This proposed law would require that motor vehicle owners and independent repair facilities be provided with expanded access to mechanical data related to vehicle maintenance and repair.	2,599,182	75.0%	867,674	25.0%	
1	Yes	Full text of measure; Website Link	2,599,182	75.0%	867,674	25.0%	
2	No	Enacts Ranked-choice voting for state and federal elections other than president.	1,549,919	45.2%	1,877,447	54.8%	
2	No	Full text of measure; Website link	1,549,919	45.2%	1,877,447	54.8%	

Several measures were not certified to circulate because they went against Massachusetts law on ballot measures. Others were cleared for circulation but did not collect enough initial signatures for the December 4, 2019 deadline.

Despite reaching a sufficient number of signatures in the first round, supporters of two measures (19-11 and 19-14) failed to collect the necessary number of signatures in the second round. By early July both initiatives had "effectively dropped their 2020 efforts".

== See also ==
- Political parties and political designations in Massachusetts
  - Massachusetts Democratic Party
  - Massachusetts Republican Party
  - Green Rainbow Party
  - Massachusetts Libertarian Party
