= Direct democracy in Massachusetts =

Massachusetts has several forms of direct democracy, allowing for initiative and referendums at the state level and in many municipalities. The recall of public officials is also provided for in many municipalities.

== History ==
The progressive movement started discussions about adopting direct democracy across the United States, and Massachusetts developed a local branch. The state branch of the Populist Party adopted the statewide initiative and referendum in its 1895 platform. State representative Henry Stirling proposed some of the first legislation for direct democracy in 1900. It was eventually enacted in 1917 at the state constitutional convention.

== State government ==
=== Initiatives ===
The state allows an indirect form of initiative for laws and constitutional amendments, and the state is considered one of the most restrictive of the states that allow initiatives.

==== Excluded subjects ====
Initiatives must be confined to one subject and cannot relate to judges and courts, relate only to specific municipalities of the state, relate to religion, make specific appropriations of money, or restrict the Declaration of Rights in the state constitution. The Office of the Attorney General of Massachusetts may do an informal review to ensure it passes these requirements.

=== Free petition ===
Massachusetts has a unique form of direct democracy in the free petition. This allows any person or group to file a bill in the state legislature, which are treated equally as a bill filed by a representative. The petition must be considered by the legislature and are submitted to a committee for public discussion, and may be voted on and enacted like any other piece of legislation.

In practice, this form of direct democracy is rarely successful in enacted new laws. In the 2015-2016 session there were at least 177 bills filed by private individuals in the state, with only four leaving committee for a floor vote and none being enacted.

Massachusetts is the only state in the country to allow citizens to file bills directly into the legislature.

=== Advisory questions ===
The General Court may put a non binding public policy question on the ballot, and constituents may also hold a nonbinding vote to instruct a representative in the legislature how they should vote on laws. The General Court may also put amendments to the US constitution on the ballot, but they are only advisory

== List of referendums ==
=== 1631-1779 ===
Summary of Referendums 1631-1779
Accepted	11
Rejected	3
Unknown	1
Total	15

Year	Result	Description
1639	Accepted	Approval of the Body of Liberties
1643	Accepted	Approval of the Articles of the New England Confederation
1644	Rejected	Election of deputies by countries instead of towns
1644	Unknown	Providing compensation for magistrates and deputies
1647	Rejected	Reducing the number of deputies to one from each town.
1689	Accepted	Resumption of the Charter revoked in 1684
1689	Accepted	Further consideration of the above question
1765	Accepted	Compensation for damages done by the mob in Boston
1776	Accepted	Approval of the Declaration of Independence
1776	Accepted	Permitting Council and the House of Representatives to frame a constitution.
1777	Accepted	Instructing Representative to act with Council in framing a constitution
1778	Rejected	Approval of the Articles of Confederation of the United States
1778	Rejected	Ratification of the Constitution of 1778
1779	Accepted	To determine whether the people desire a new constitution
1779	Accepted	Shall the representatives call a new constitutional convention?

=== 1780 - 1907 ===
Note any results before March 15, 1820 include the current state of Maine.

Origin	Status	Measure	Description (Result of a "yes" vote)	Date	Yes	No
	Approved	Adoption of the Constitution	Ratification of the Constitution.	1780	12,000	1,000
	Failed	Expediency of Amending the Constitution	Calling a constitutional convention	1795, May 6	7,999	8,325
		To abolish support, by the towns, of protestant ministers and required attendance upon the instructions of the clergy	Changed the constitutional support of public worship and appointment of public teachers to include all Christian denominations, not just Protestant. Provided that all church taxes raised in the State may go to the denomination of one's choosing, instead of only to the Congregational Church. Also provided that no person may be imprisoned or brought to trial without an indictment by a Grand Jury.	1820, Aug 21		
		To change the political year and date of state election	Moved the start of the political year from the first Wednesday of May to the first Wednesday of January. All elected officials would start their yearly term starting on that date in January. The article also moved the date of the yearly state election to the second Monday of November from the first Monday of April.	1821, Apr 9		
		To forbid bills unsigned after adjournment of General Court to become laws	Provided that if the General Court adjourned before the deadline the Governor had to return a rejected bill, then the law would not be passed.	1821, Apr 9		
		To empower the legislature to grant city charters.	Allowed the state to establish city forms of government for towns over 12,000 inhabitants. It provided for the legislature to draft laws to allow these cities to have different forms of governance than the traditional town meeting.	1821, Apr 9		
		To Change Method of electing Senators, Representatives, and Councillors		1821, Apr 9		
		To Abolish Property Qualifications for Voters	Eliminated almost all property and tax restrictions for voting, the exception being paupers. All male citizens over 21 who had resided in the state for one year were entitled to vote.	1821, Apr 9		
		To Authorize Appointment of Notaries Public by the Governor	Provided for the gubernatorial appointment of notaries public, the Commissary General, and vacancies for the Secretary and Treasurer.	1821, Apr 9		
		To Allow All Members of Militia to Vote for their Captains and Subalterns	Allowed men serving in the militia, but under the age of 21, to vote for their company Captains and Subalterns the same as men over the age of 21.	1821, Apr 9		
		To Empower Governor to Remove Justices of the Peace and to Prohibit Referring Certain Questions to Supreme Court	Amended the process of removing judicial officers, including justices of the peace. Forbade the Governor and Legislature from soliciting the legal opinion of the Supreme Judicial Court.	1821, Apr 9		
		To Allow Overseers of Harvard College Free Choice in Election of Ministers of their Board	Allowed the positions reserved for ministers of churches on the Harvard Board of Overseers to be open to all christian denominations. Harvard at the time was publicly funded and prior to this amendment it selected board members from the congregational church.	1821, Apr 9		
		To Simplify the Oath of Allegience	Amended the oath of allegiance required for all public officials to hold office. It provided an exception for Quakers who refuse to swear oaths.	1821, Apr 9		
		To Require No Other Oath than that Allegience of Any Civil or Military Office	Specified that no other oath or declaration was required to hold public office except for the one provided for in the eleventh article.	1821, Apr 9		
		To Make Judges (except of Court of Sessions) and Officials of the United States (except Postmasters) Ineligible to State Office	Forbade state judges from holding any other state office. Forbade anyone holding a state office from holding a federal office other than postmaster.	1821, Apr 9		
		To Provide that Proposed Amendments of Constitution Must be Passed by Two Successive Legislatures before Submission to the People	Changed the process for amending the Constitution. It required a vote of one-half of Senators and two-thirds of Representatives to vote positively on an amendment in two consecutive sessions. It would then be presented to the voters for approval.	1821, Apr 9		

=== 2000- ===
- 2002 Massachusetts ballot measures
- 2004 Massachusetts ballot measures
- 2006 Massachusetts ballot measures
- 2008 Massachusetts ballot measures
- 2010 Massachusetts ballot measures
- 2012 Massachusetts ballot measures
- 2014 Massachusetts ballot measures
- 2016 Massachusetts ballot measures
- 2018 Massachusetts ballot measures
- 2020 Massachusetts ballot measures
- 2022 Massachusetts ballot measures
- 2024 Massachusetts ballot measures

== See also ==
- Elections in Massachusetts
- Direct Democracy
- Initiatives and referendums in the United States
