= 2026 Massachusetts Governor's Council election =

2026 Massachusetts Governor's Council elections
- November 3, 2026

All 8 seats to the Massachusetts Governor's Council
	Majority party	Minority party
Party	Democratic	Republican
Last election	8	0

The 2026 Massachusetts Governor's Council election will be held on November 3, 2026 to elect all 8 members of the Massachusetts Governor's Council. The election will be held concurrently with elections to the United States Senate, U.S. House of Representatives, governor, and other state and local elections. Primary elections will be held on September 1.

The previous election saw Democrats hold all 8 seats on the Governor's Council.

== District 1 ==
The 1st Governor's Council district is based in the southeastern part of the state and includes the Cape and Islands. Incumbent Democrat Joseph Ferreira, who was reelected with 56.4% of the vote in 2024, is running for re-election. No candidates filed to run in the Republican primary.

=== Democratic primary ===
==== Candidates ====
===== Nominee =====
- Joseph Ferreira, incumbent governor's councillor

==== Results ====
Democratic primary results
Party	Candidate	Votes	%
Democratic	Joseph Ferreira (incumbent)	85,508	99.9
Write-in		127	0.1
Total votes		85,635	100.0

== District 2 ==
The 2nd Governor's Council district is in southeastern Massachusetts and includes cities like Attleboro. Incumbent Democrat Tamisha Civil, who was first elected with 57.2% of the vote in 2024, is running for re-election. Francis Crimmins Jr., the Republican nominee for this seat in 2024, is unopposed in the Republican primary.

=== Democratic primary ===
==== Candidates ====
===== Nominee =====
- Tamisha Civil, incumbent governor's councillor

==== Results ====
Democratic primary results
Party	Candidate	Votes	%
Democratic	Tamisha Civil (incumbent)	83,606	99.7
Write-in		271	0.3
Total votes		83,877	100.0

=== Republican primary ===
==== Candidates ====
===== Nominee =====
- Francis Crimmins Jr., Republican nominee for this district in 2024

==== Results ====
Republican primary results
Party	Candidate	Votes	%
Republican	Francis Crimmins Jr.	25,595	99.3
Write-in		175	0.7
Total votes		25,670	100.0

== District 3 ==
The 3rd Governor's Council district is contained to eastern Massachusetts. Incumbent Democrat Mara Dolan, who was first elected in 2024, is running for re-election and faces Margie Palladino, a family court reform advocate, in the Democratic primary. No candidates filed to run in the Republican primary.

=== Democratic primary ===
==== Candidates ====
===== Nominee =====
- Mara Dolan, incumbent governor's councillor

===== Eliminated in primary =====
- Margie Palladino, executive director of the Mass Family Advocacy Coalition

==== Endorsements ====
Mara Dolan

U.S. representatives

- Lori Trahan, MA-03 (2019–present)
Margie Palladino

Statewide officials

- Diana DiZoglio, state auditor of Massachusetts (2023–present)

==== Results ====
Democratic primary results
Party	Candidate	Votes	%
Democratic	Mara Dolan (incumbent)	87,618	74.7
Democratic	Margie Palladino	29,471	25.1
Write-in		167	0.2
Total votes		117,256	100.0

== District 4 ==
The 4th Governor's Council district contains much of Boston. Incumbent Democrat Christopher Iannella Jr., who has represented the district since 1993, is running for re-election and faces one challenger in the Democratic primary. No candidates filed to run in the Republican primary.

=== Democratic primary ===
==== Candidates ====
===== Nominee =====
- Christopher Iannella Jr., incumbent governor's councillor

===== Eliminated in primary =====
- Ronald Iacobucci, candidate for this district in 2024

===== Disqualified =====
- Jordan Korgood, progressive activist

==== Results ====
Democratic primary results
Party	Candidate	Votes	%
Democratic	Christopher Iannella Jr. (incumbent)	69,953	70.5
Democratic	Ronald Iacobucci	28,712	28.9
Write-in		584	0.6
Total votes		99,249	100.0

== District 5 ==
The 5th Governor's Council district represents much of the North Shore. Incumbent Democrat Eunice Zeigler, who was first elected with 47.2% of the vote in 2024, is running for re-election. No candidates filed to run in the Republican primary.

=== Democratic primary ===
==== Candidates ====
===== Nominee =====
- Eunice Zeigler, incumbent governor's councillor

==== Results ====
Democratic primary results
Party	Candidate	Votes	%
Democratic	Eunice Zeigler (incumbent)	86,446	99.6
Write-in		377	0.4
Total votes		86,823	100.0

=== Republican primary ===
==== Candidates ====
===== Nominee =====
- William Falcetano (write-in)

==== Results ====
Republican primary results
Party	Candidate	Votes	%
Republican	William Falcetano (write-in)	1,216	42.8
Write-in		1,625	57.2
Total votes		2,841	100.0

== District 6 ==
The 6th Governor's Council district represents cities and towns north of Boston. Incumbent Democrat Terrence W. Kennedy is running for re-election and faces Diann Baylis in the Democratic primary. No candidates filed to run in the Republican primary.

=== Democratic primary ===
==== Candidates ====
===== Nominee =====
- Terrence W. Kennedy, incumbent governor's councillor

===== Eliminated in primary =====
- Diann Mary Baylis, immigration attorney

==== Results ====
Democratic primary results
Party	Candidate	Votes	%
Democratic	Terrence W. Kennedy (incumbent)	56,963	58.1
Democratic	Diann Mary Baylis	40,722	41.6
Write-in		277	0.3
Total votes		97,962	100.0

== District 7 ==
The 7th Governor's Council district represents much of central Massachusetts, including Worcester. Incumbent Democrat Paul DePalo, who won with 57.3% of the vote in 2024, is running for re-election. Margaret Abboud of Worcester is running unopposed for the Republican nomination.

=== Democratic primary ===
==== Candidates ====
===== Nominee =====
- Paul DePalo, incumbent governor's councillor

==== Results ====
Democratic primary results
Party	Candidate	Votes	%
Democratic	Paul DePalo (incumbent)	67,847	99.6
Write-in		253	0.4
Total votes		68,100	100.0

=== Republican primary ===
==== Candidates ====
===== Nominee =====
- Margaret Abboud

==== Results ====
Republican primary results
Party	Candidate	Votes	%
Republican	Margaret Abboud	28,477	98.8
Write-in		357	1.2
Total votes		28,834	100.0

== District 8 ==
The 8th Governor's Council district represents the majority of western Massachusetts. Incumbent Democrat Tara Jacobs is running for re-election and faces Mike Fenton, a candidate for this seat in 2022, in the Democratic primary. No candidates filed to run in the Republican primary.

=== Democratic primary ===
==== Candidates ====
===== Nominee =====
- Tara Jacobs, incumbent governor's councillor

===== Eliminated in primary =====
- Mike Fenton, Springfield city councilor

==== Results ====
Democratic primary results
Party	Candidate	Votes	%
Democratic	Tara Jacobs (incumbent)	62,914	62.0
Democratic	Mike Fenton	38,508	37.9
Write-in		105	0.1
Total votes		101,527	100.0
