= 2026 Massachusetts gubernatorial election =

- November 3, 2026
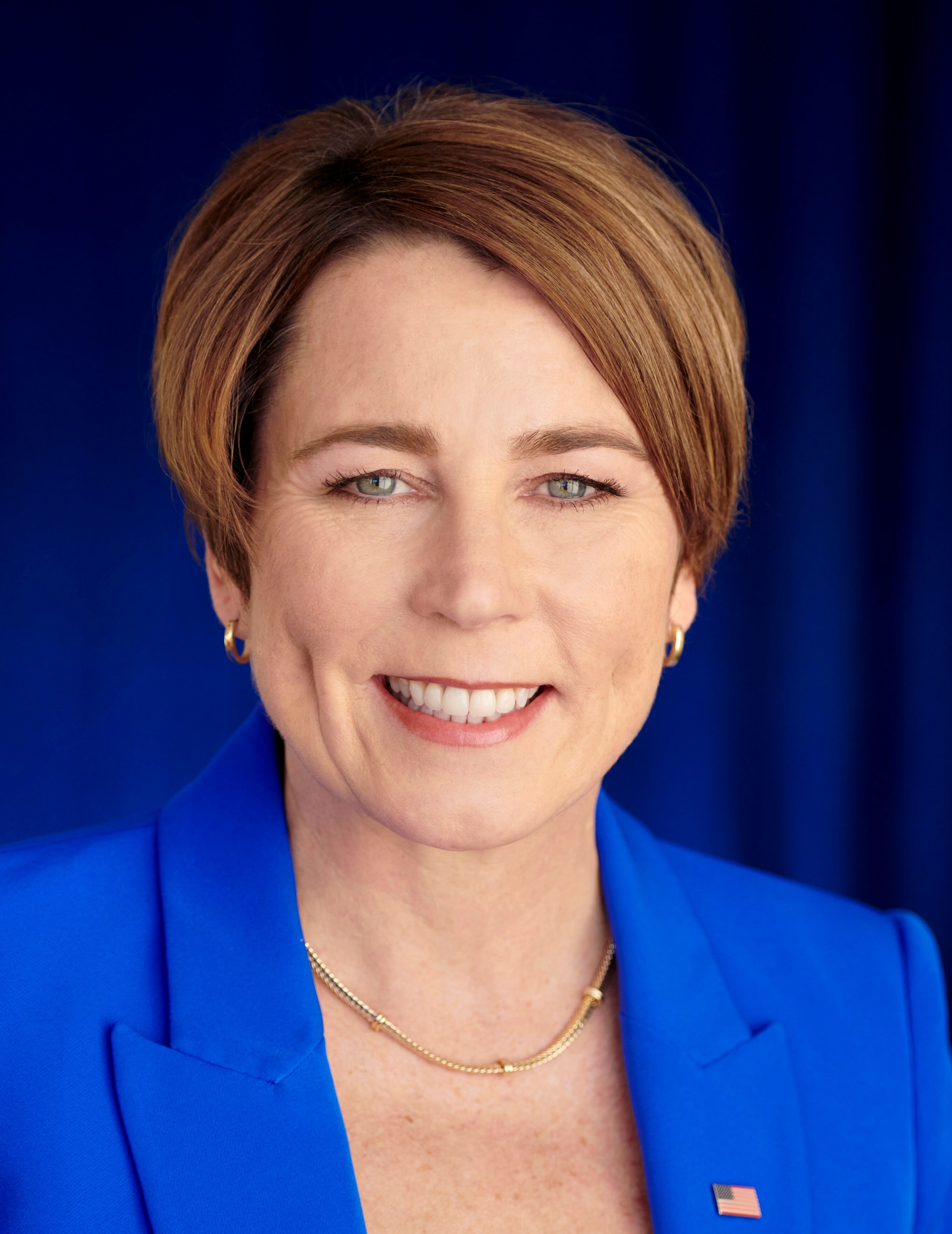

Nominee	Maura Healey	Mike Minogue
Party	Democratic	Republican
Running mate	Kim Driscoll	Shawn Oliver (withdrawn; remained on ballot) (Note: Minogue asked Oliver to drop out of the race after he was arrested on charges of driving under the influence, saying that he would ask Oliver to immediately resign if elected.)
Popular vote	1,691,156	930,508
Percentage	62.31%	34.28%
- Healey: 40–50% 50–60% 60–70% 70–80% 80–90% >90% Minogue: 40–50% 50–60% 60–70%
Governor before election
Maura Healey
Democratic
Elected Governor
Maura Healey
Democratic

The 2026 Massachusetts gubernatorial election was held on November 3, 2026, to elect the governor of Massachusetts. Democratic incumbent Maura Healey won re-election to a second term, defeating Republican businessman Mike Minogue.

Primary elections took place on September 1, 2026, where Healey won the Democratic nomination running unopposed, while Minogue won the Republican nomination against Brian Shortsleeve. In the run-up to the general election, Republican candidate Mike Minogue spent $6.1 million in September 2026 on his election bid, making it the most expensive gubernatorial race in Massachusetts history. Minogue outspent the 2006 Republican nominee and former Lieutenant Governor Kerry Healey, who spent $4.4 million in the run-up to the general election versus Deval Patrick.

== Democratic primary ==
=== Governor ===
==== Candidates ====
===== Nominee =====
- Maura Healey, incumbent governor (2023–present)

===== Declined =====
- Diana DiZoglio, Massachusetts state auditor (2023–present) (running for re-election)

==== Endorsements ====
Maura Healey

Statewide officials

- Paul DePalo, governor's councillor from the 7th district (2021–present)

State legislators

- Brian Ashe, state representative from the 2nd Hampden district (2009–present)
- Dan Donahue, state representative from the 16th Worcester district (2013–present)
- Patricia Duffy, state representative from the 5th Hampden district (2021–present)
- Mary Keefe, state representative from the 15th Worcester district (2013–present)
- Robyn Kennedy, state senator from the 1st Worcester district (2023–present)
- David LeBoeuf, state representative from the 17th Worcester district (2019–present)
- John J. Mahoney, state representative from the 13th Worcester district (2011–present)
- Michael O. Moore, state senator from the 2nd Worcester district (2009–present)
- Jim O'Day, state representative from the 14th Worcester district (2007–present)

Local officials

- Joshua Garcia, mayor of Holyoke (2021–present)
- Joseph O'Brien, former mayor of Worcester (2010–2012)
- Joseph Petty, mayor of Worcester (2012–present)

Labor unions

- 1199SEIU United Healthcare Workers East
- Massachusetts AFL-CIO
- SEIU 32BJ
- Sheet Metal Workers Local 17

Organizations

- EMILYs List
- End Citizens United
- Giffords
- Human Rights Campaign
- Jewish Democratic Council of America
- LGBTQ+ Victory Fund
- Planned Parenthood Action Fund

Political parties

- Massachusetts Democratic Party

==== Results ====
Democratic primary results
Party	Candidate	Votes	%
Democratic	Maura Healey (incumbent)	767,711	98.3
Write-in		12,897	1.7
Total votes		780,608	100.0

=== Lieutenant governor ===
==== Candidates ====
===== Nominee =====
- Kim Driscoll, incumbent lieutenant governor (2023–present)

==== Endorsements ====
Kim Driscoll

Statewide officials

- Paul DePalo, governor's councillor from the 7th district (2021–present)

State legislators

- Dan Donahue, state representative from the 16th Worcester district (2013–present)
- Mary Keefe, state representative from the 15th Worcester district (2013–present)
- Robyn Kennedy, state senator from the 1st Worcester district (2023–present)
- David LeBoeuf, state representative from the 17th Worcester district (2019–present)
- John J. Mahoney, state representative from the 13th Worcester district (2011–present)
- Michael O. Moore, state senator from the 2nd Worcester district (2009–present)
- Jim O'Day, state representative from the 14th Worcester district (2007–present)

Local officials

- Joshua Garcia, mayor of Holyoke (2021–present)
- Joseph O'Brien, former mayor of Worcester (2010–2012)
- Joseph Petty, mayor of Worcester (2012–present)

Labor unions

- Sheet Metal Workers Local 17

Organizations

- EMILYs List
- Planned Parenthood Action Fund

Political parties

- Massachusetts Democratic Party

==== Polling ====
Hypothetical polling

Poll source	Date(s) administered	Sample size (Note: Key: A – all adults RV – registered voters LV – likely voters V – unclear)	Margin of error	Maura Healey	Diana DiZoglio	Other	Undecided
Suffolk University (Note: Poll sponsored by The Boston Globe)	April 9–13, 2026	500 (RV)	± 4.4%	63%	11%	1% (Note: "Refused" with 1%; "Another Democrat" with 0%)	25%

Poll source	Date(s) administered	Sample size	Margin of error	Kim Driscoll	Maura Healey	Other	Undecided
Suffolk University	April 9–13, 2026	500 (RV)	± 4.4%	10%	66%	2% (Note: "Refused" with 2%; "Another Democrat" with 0%)	22%

==== Results ====
Democratic primary results
Party	Candidate	Votes	%
Democratic	Kim Driscoll (incumbent)	745,562	99.2
Write-in		5,984	0.8
Total votes		751,546	100.0

== Republican primary ==
=== Governor ===
==== Candidates ====
===== Nominee =====
- Michael Minogue, former CEO of Abiomed

===== Eliminated in primary =====
- Brian Shortsleeve, former chief administrator and acting general manager of the Massachusetts Bay Transportation Authority (running with Shawn Oliver)

===== Eliminated at convention =====
- Mike Kennealy, former Massachusetts secretary of housing and economic development (ran with Anne Manning Martin, endorsed Minogue after convention)

===== Declined =====
- John Deaton, attorney and nominee for U.S. Senate in 2024 (ran for U.S. Senate)
- Peter Durant, state senator from the Worcester and Hampshire district (2023–present) (ran for re-election)

==== Endorsements ====
Michael Minogue

Party officials

- Jim Lyons, former chair of the Massachusetts Republican Party (2019–2023) and former state representative from the 18th Essex district (2011–2019)

Individuals

- Mike Kennealy, former Massachusetts secretary of housing and urban development; former candidate for this seat

Political parties

- Massachusetts Republican Party
Mike Kennealy (eliminated at convention)

State legislators

- F. Jay Barrows, former state representative from the 1st Bristol district (2007–2025)
- Kimberly Ferguson, state representative from the 1st Worcester district (2011–present)
- Hannah Kane, state representative from the 11th Worcester district (2015–present)
Brian Shortsleeve

Executive branch officials

- Scott Brown, former ambassador to New Zealand and Samoa (2017–2020) and former U.S. senator from Massachusetts (2010–2013)

U.S. senators

- Tom Cotton, Arkansas (2015–present)
- Rick Scott, Florida (2019–present)

State legislators

- Nicholas Boldyga, state representative from the 3rd Hampden district (2011–present)
- Ginny Coppola, former state representative from the 1st Bristol district (2006–2007)
- William Crocker Jr., former state representative from the 2nd Barnstable district (2017–2021)
- Peter Durant, state senator from the Worcester and Hampshire district (2023–present)
- Paul Frost, state representative from the 7th Worcester district (1997–present)
- Marc Lombardo, state representative from the 22nd Middlesex district (2011–present)
- Jeff Perry, former state representative from the 5th Barnstable district (2003–2011)
- Michael Soter, state representative from the 8th Worcester district (2019–present)
- Daniel K. Webster, former state representative from the 6th Plymouth district (2003–2013)

Local officials

- Shaunna O'Connell, mayor of Taunton (2020–present) and former state representative from the 3rd Bristol district (2011–2020)

Newspapers

- The Boston Globe (Republican primary only)
Declined to endorse

Statewide officials

- Charlie Baker, former governor of Massachusetts (2015–2023)

==== Polling ====
Poll source	Date(s) administered	Sample size	Margin of error	Mike Kennealy	Brian Shortsleeve	Mike Minogue	Other	Undecided
University of New Hampshire	August 20–24, 2026	201 (LV)	± 6.9%	–	11%	55%	9% (Note: "Write in someone else" with 9%)	25%
UMass Amherst/YouGov (Note: Poll sponsored by WCVB)	August 5–12, 2026	209 (RV)	± 8.7%	–	26%	53% (Note: With voters who lean towards a given candidate)	4% (Note: "Would not vote" with 4%)	18%
UMass Amherst/YouGov	August 5–12, 2026	209 (RV)	± 8.7%	–	24%	49%	4% (Note: "Would not vote" with 4%)	24%
University of New Hampshire	June 18–23, 2026	176 (LV)	± 7.4%	–	15%	46%	–	39%
Suffolk University	May 26–29, 2026	465 (LV)	± 4.5%	–	13%	45%	1% (Note: "Another Republican" with 1%)	40%
	April 25, 2026	Kennealy eliminated at Republican convention						
Pulse Decision Science (R) (Note: Poll sponsored by Minogue's campaign)	February 23–24, 2026	500 (LV)	± 4.9%	7%	16%	29%	–	48%
Suffolk University	November 19–23, 2025	93 (LV)	± 10.2%	13%	22%	6%	–	59%
UMass Amherst/YouGov	October 21–29, 2025	183 (A)	–	44%	13%	13%	3% (Note: "Would not vote" with 3%)	27%
UMass Amherst/YouGov	October 21–29, 2025	183 (A)	–	27%	15%	15%	0% (Note: "Would not vote" with 0%)	43%
University of New Hampshire	September 17–23, 2025	148 (LV)	± 8.0%	22%	31%	–	–	47%

==== Convention ====
Republican convention vote, April 25
Party	Candidate	Votes	%
Republican	Michael Minogue	1,262	70.4
Republican	Brian Shortsleeve	278	15.5
Republican	Mike Kennealy	253	14.1
Total votes		1,793	100.0

==== Results ====
Republican primary results
Party	Candidate	Votes	%
Republican	Michael Minogue	194,758	75.6
Republican	Brian Shortsleeve	62,161	24.1
Write-in		612	0.3
Total votes		257,531	100.0

=== Lieutenant governor ===
Anne Brensley did not officially become the running mate to a candidate for governor. However, she was supported by gubernatorial candidate Michael Minogue.

==== Candidates ====
===== Nominee =====
- Shawn Oliver, New Bedford city councilor and former corrections officer (ran with Brian Shortsleeve)

===== Disqualified =====
- Anne Brensley, former Wayland Selectmen member (2023–2026) (running for secretary of state)
- Anne Manning Martin, Peabody city councilor and nominee for the 5th Governor's Council district in 2024 (ran a write-in campaign, previously ran with Mike Kennealy)

==== Endorsements ====
Anne Brensley (disqualified)

Individuals

- Michael Minogue, candidate for governor

Organizations

- Maggie's List

Political parties

- Massachusetts Republican Party
Anne Manning Martin (disqualified)

Individuals

- Mike Kennealy, gubernatorial candidate
Shawn Oliver

Individuals

- Brian Shortsleeve, gubernatorial candidate

==== Convention ====
Republican convention vote, April 25
Party	Candidate	Votes	%
Republican	Anne Brensley	1,100	56.1
Republican	Anne Manning-Martin	536	27.3
Republican	Shawn Oliver	325	16.6
Total votes		1,961	100.0

==== Results ====
Republican primary results
Party	Candidate	Votes	%
Republican	Shawn Oliver	195,352	91.6
Republican	Anne Manning Martin (write-in)	14,611	6.9
Write-in		3,208	1.5
Total votes		213,171	100.0

== Third parties and independents ==
=== Candidates ===
==== Declared ====
- Andrea James, criminal justice nonprofit executive (Independent)
  - Running mate: Kayla Kittredge (Independent)

==== Did not qualify ====
- Muhammed Kokonezis-Hanino (Independent)

== General election ==
=== Shawn Oliver arrest ===
Around 11:40 p.m. EST on October 17, 2026, Minogue's running mate Shawn Oliver crashed into multiple parked cars after his SUV rolled over on Dartmouth Street in New Bedford. He was taken to St. Luke's Hospital and subsequently arrested on charges of driving under the influence, negligent operation of a motor vehicle, a lane violation, and speeding. Minogue said he was "extremely disappointed" and asked Oliver to suspend his campaign, saying that he would immediately ask him to resign if elected. Oliver suspended his campaign on October 18, but his name remained on the ballot.

=== Predictions ===
Source	Ranking	As of
The Cook Political Report	Solid D	October 29, 2026
Decision Desk HQ	Safe D	November 3, 2026
Fox News	Solid D	November 1, 2026
Inside Elections	Solid D	October 29, 2026
NBC News	Solid D	November 3, 2026
RealClearPolitics	Solid D	November 1, 2026
Sabato's Crystal Ball	Safe D	November 2, 2026
Silver Bulletin	Solid D	November 3, 2026

=== Post-primary endorsements ===
Mike Minogue (R)

Organizations

- Log Cabin Republicans

=== Polling ===
Aggregate polls

Source of poll aggregation	Dates administered	Dates updated	Maura Healey (D)	Mike Minogue (R)	Other/Undecided (Note: Calculated by taking the difference of 100% and all other candidates combined.)	Margin
270toWin	September 17 – October 18, 2026	October 20, 2026	56.0%	34.5%	9.5%	Healey +21.5%
RealClearPolitics	September 14 – October 18, 2026	October 20, 2026	56.0%	34.5%	9.5%	Healey +21.5%
Silver Bulletin	through October 12, 2026	October 19, 2026	57.2%	33.8%	9.0%	Healey +23.4%
Average			56.4%	34.3%	9.3%	Healey +22.1%

Poll source	Date(s) administered	Sample size	Margin of error	Maura Healey (D)	Mike Minogue (R)	Andrea James (I)	Other	Undecided
University of New Hampshire	October 27–31, 2026	905 (LV)	± 3.3%	55%	36%	5%	1%	4%
Suffolk University	October 14–18, 2026	500 (LV)	± 4.4%	59%	36%	2%	—	3%
UMass Lowell	October 7–18, 2026	850 (LV)	± 4.4%	57%	29%	4%	—	8%
UMass Amherst/YouGov	October 5–12, 2026	800 (RV)	± 4.2%	56%	31%	5%	1%	7%
UMass Amherst/YouGov	October 5–12, 2026	800 (RV)	± 4.2%	57%	32%	6%	2%	3%
MassINC Polling Group	September 14–22, 2026	800 (LV)	± 4.0%	51%	30%	3%	2% (Note: "Prefer not to say" with 2%)	12%
MassINC Polling Group	September 14–22, 2026	800 (LV)	± 4.0%	54%	32%	4%	5% (Note: "Another candidate" with 3%; "Prefer not to say" with 2%)	6%
University of New Hampshire	September 17–21, 2026	564 (LV)	± 4.1%	54%	38%	—	1% (Note: "Another candidate" with 1%)	7%
University of New Hampshire	August 20–24, 2026	881 (LV)	± 2.2%	54%	30%	—	2% (Note: "Write in someone else" with 2%)	14%
UMass Amherst/YouGov	August 5–12, 2026	800 (RV)	± 4.4%	53%	33%	—	2% (Note: "Would not vote" with 2%)	12%
University of New Hampshire	June 18–23, 2026	623 (LV)	± 3.8%	51%	32%	—	1%	16%
Suffolk University	June 8–12, 2026	500 (LV)	± 4.4%	56%	31%	—	1% (Note: "Refused" with 1%)	11%
Polity Research Consulting (Note: Poll sponsored by the Retailers Association of Massachusetts)	April 19 – May 7, 2026	608 (RV)	± 4.0%	58%	31%	—	—	11%
University of New Hampshire	April 16–20, 2026	599 (LV)	± 4.0%	52%	32%	—	—	15%
University of New Hampshire	February 12–16, 2026	620 (LV)	± 3.9%	56%	27%	—	2% (Note: "Another candidate" with 2%)	15%
UMass Amherst/YouGov	October 21–29, 2025	800 (A)	± 4.1%	51%	26%	—	7% (Note: "Would not vote" with 7%)	16%

Hypothetical polling

Maura Healey vs. Brian Shortsleeve

Poll source	Date(s) administered	Sample size	Margin of error	Maura Healey (D)	Brian Shortsleeve (R)	Other	Undecided
University of New Hampshire	August 20–24, 2026	881 (LV)	± 2.2%	55%	28%	3% (Note: "Write in someone else" with 3%)	14%
UMass Amherst/YouGov	August 5–12, 2026	800 (RV)	± 4.4%	51%	32%	3% (Note: "Would not vote" with 3%)	14%
University of New Hampshire	June 18–23, 2026	623 (LV)	± 3.8%	50%	32%	3%	15%
Suffolk University	June 8–12, 2026	500 (LV)	± 4.4%	56%	29%	2% (Note: "Refused" with 2%)	13%
Polity Research Consulting	April 19 – May 7, 2026	608 (RV)	± 4.0%	59%	30%	–	11%
University of New Hampshire	April 16–20, 2026	603 (LV)	± 4.0%	51%	29%	3% (Note: "Another candidate" with 3%)	17%
University of New Hampshire	February 12–16, 2026	620 (LV)	± 3.9%	58%	28%	1% (Note: "Another candidate" with 1%)	13%
UMass Amherst/YouGov	October 21–29, 2025	800 (A)	± 4.1%	48%	27%	7%	18%
Advantage, Inc. (R) (Note: Poll sponsored by the Fiscal Alliance Foundation)	September 23–24, 2025	750 (LV)	± 3.6%	46%	31%	–	23%
UMass Amherst/YouGov	February 14–20, 2025	700 (A)	± 4.8%	44%	12%	6% (Note: "Would not vote" with 6%)	38%

Maura Healey vs. John Deaton

Poll source	Date(s) administered	Sample size	Margin of error	Maura Healey (D)	John Deaton (R)	Other	Undecided
UMass Amherst/YouGov	February 14–20, 2025	700 (A)	± 4.8%	45%	25%	4% (Note: "Would not vote" with 4%)	26%

Maura Healey vs. Peter Durant

Poll source	Date(s) administered	Sample size	Margin of error	Maura Healey (D)	Peter Durant (R)	Other	Undecided
UMass Amherst/YouGov	February 14–20, 2025	700 (A)	± 4.8%	41%	14%	6%	39%

Maura Healey vs. Lewis Evangelidis

Poll source	Date(s) administered	Sample size	Margin of error	Maura Healey (D)	Lewis Evangelidis (R)	Other	Undecided
UMass Amherst/YouGov	February 14–20, 2025	700 (A)	± 4.8%	44%	14%	6%	36%

Maura Healey vs. Mike Kennealy

Poll source	Date(s) administered	Sample size	Margin of error	Maura Healey (D)	Mike Kennealy (R)	Other	Undecided
University of New Hampshire	April 16–20, 2026	597 (LV)	± 4.0%	53%	32%	3%	13%
University of New Hampshire	February 12–16, 2026	620 (LV)	± 3.9%	55%	28%	2%	15%
UMass Amherst/YouGov	October 21–29, 2025	800 (A)	± 4.1%	49%	27%	7%	17%
Advantage, Inc. (R)	September 23–24, 2025	750 (LV)	± 3.6%	45%	34%	–	21%
UMass Amherst/YouGov	February 14–20, 2025	700 (A)	± 4.8%	40%	15%	6%	39%

=== Results ===
2026 Massachusetts gubernatorial election
Party	Candidate	Votes	%	±%
Democratic	Maura Healey (incumbent); Kim Driscoll (incumbent)	1,691,156	62.31	
Republican	Michael Minogue; Shawn Oliver (withdrawn)	930,508	34.28	
Independent	Andrea C. James; Kayla Kittredge	89,951	3.32	+3.32
Write-in		2,496	0.09	
Total votes		2,714,111	100.00	
Democratic hold				

== See also ==
- 2026 United States gubernatorial elections

== Notes ==
Partisan clients
