= 2026 Massachusetts elections =

Elections in the US state

- November 3, 2026

Elections were held in the U.S. state of Massachusetts in 2026 as part of the 2026 United States elections. At the federal level, elections were held for a U.S. Senate seat and for each of Massachusetts' 9 U.S. House of Representative districts. At the state level, elections were held for the Governor, Attorney General, Secretary of the Commonwealth, Treasurer, and State Auditor. Elections were also held for the General Court (state senate and state house) and the Governor's Council. In addition, nine ballot questions were on the ballot. Primaries were held on September 1, 2026 and general elections were held on November 3, 2026.

== Federal offices ==
=== U.S. Senate ===
An election for Massachusetts's Class 2 Senate seat was held on November 3, 2026. Incumbent Democrat Ed Markey was reelected. On the Republican side, John Deaton made another bid after previously running against Elizabeth Warren as the Republican nominee in 2024.

=== U.S. House of Representatives ===
Elections for Massachusetts's nine seats in the House of Representatives were held on November 3, 2026. In 2024, Democrats won all nine seats, with all incumbents being re-elected. Primaries were held on September 1. All nine seats were won by Democrats.

District		Incumbent				Candidates
Location	2026 PVI	Member	Party	First elected	Results	Candidates
Massachusetts 1	D+8	Richard Neal	Democratic	1988	Incumbent re-elected.	✓ Richard Neal (Democratic); Nadia Milleron (Independent)
Massachusetts 2	D+13	Jim McGovern	Democratic	1996	Incumbent re-elected.	✓ Jim McGovern (Democratic)
Massachusetts 3	D+11	Lori Trahan	Democratic	2018	Incumbent re-elected.	✓ Lori Trahan (Democratic); Gary Grossi (Republican); Dennis Conlon (Independent)
Massachusetts 4	D+11	Jake Auchincloss	Democratic	2020	Incumbent re-elected.	✓ Jake Auchincloss (Democratic); Thomas Stalcup (Republican)
Massachusetts 5	D+24	Katherine Clark	Democratic	2013 (special)	Incumbent re-elected.	✓ Katherine Clark (Democratic)
Massachusetts 6	D+11	Seth Moulton	Democratic	2014	Incumbent retired to run for U.S. Senate. Democratic hold.	✓ Dan Koh (Democratic); Micah Jones (Republican)
Massachusetts 7	D+34	Ayanna Pressley	Democratic	2018	Incumbent re-elected.	✓ Ayanna Pressley (Democratic)
Massachusetts 8	D+15	Stephen Lynch	Democratic	2001 (special)	Incumbent re-elected.	✓ Stephen Lynch (Democratic); Robert Burke (Republican); Rasheed Walters (Independent)
Massachusetts 9	D+6	Bill Keating	Democratic	2010	Incumbent re-elected.	✓ Bill Keating (Democratic); Tyler MacAllister (Republican)

== State offices ==
=== Governor ===
Incumbent Democratic governor Maura Healey and lieutenant governor Kim Driscoll won reelection against Republican nominee Michael Minogue. They were first elected in 2022 with 63.74% of the vote.

=== Attorney General ===
Incumbent Democratic attorney general Andrea Campbell won reelection against Republican Michael Walsh. Campbell won 62.85% of the vote in 2022.

=== Secretary of the Commonwealth ===
Incumbent Democratic secretary of the commonwealth William F. Galvin won reelection to a 9th term and faces Republican nominee Anne Brensley. Galvin won 67.69% of the vote in 2022.

=== Treasurer and Receiver-General ===
Incumbent Democratic treasurer Deb Goldberg won reelection against Republican nominee Elizabeth Dionne. Goldberg won 76.47% of the vote in 2022, facing only third-party opposition.

=== State Auditor ===
Incumbent Democratic auditor Diana DiZoglio won reelection. No Republican filed to run against her. DiZoglio won 55.1% of the vote in 2022.

=== Governor's Council ===
All 8 seats on the Massachusetts Governor's Council are up for election. In 2024, Democrats won all 8 seats. All 8 seats were once again won by Democrats.

== State legislature ==
=== Massachusetts Senate ===
Elections for the upper house of the Massachusetts General Court were held on November 3, 2026. All 40 Senate seats will be up for election. Democrats retained their supermajority in the chamber in 2024. Democrats once again retained their supermajority.

=== Massachusetts House of Representatives ===
Elections for the lower house of the Massachusetts General Court were held on November 3, 2026. All 160 House of Representatives seats will be up for election. Democrats retained their supermajority in the chamber in 2024. Democrats once again retained their supermajority.

== Ballot questions ==
Nine ballot questions were on the ballot. The Massachusetts legislature had until May to either implement the proposals, reach a compromise with organizers, or do nothing, allowing organizers to gather more signatures to officially place the measures on the ballot. They did not take action on any of the measures. Legislative leaders raised concerns about the number of ballot measures, which they claimed are often crafted by special interest groups. One question was a veto referendum to repeal firearms regulations passed in 2024.

Topics of certified questions included creation of a new nature conservation fund to be funded by sales tax revenue, a proposal to place gubernatorial and legislative records under the state's public records law, implementation of same-day voter registration, a proposal to allow Committee for Public Counsel Services (a board which oversees the state's public defender system) employees to form a union, a new limit to how much the state can collect in tax revenue, a limit on lot size requirements to allow for single-family homes to be built on more plots of land, a proposal to implement nonpartisan primaries, and a proposal to repeal Massachusetts's law allowing for recreational marijuana use.

=== Summary ===
No.	Question				Status
1	Initiative Petition for a Law to Improve Access to Public Records	Full text of measure	Proponent website		Approved
2	Initiative Petition for a Law Relative to Labor Relations Policies for Committee for Public Counsel Services Employees	Full text of measure	Proponent website		Approved
3	Initiative Petition for a Law to Implement All-Party State Primaries	Full text of measure	Proponent website	Opponent website	Rejected
4	Initiative Petition for a Law Relative to Election Day Registration	Full text of measure	Proponent website		Approved
5	Initiative Petition for a Law Relative to Limiting State Tax Collection Growth and Returning Surpluses to Taxpayers	Full text of measure	Proponent website	Opponent website	Rejected
6	Initiative Petition for a Law to Protect Water & Nature	Full text of measure	Proponent website		Approved
7	Initiative Petition for a Law to Allow Single-Family Homes on Small Lots in Areas with Adequate Infrastructure	Full text of measure	Proponent website		Rejected
8	Initiative Petition for a Law Relative to Regulating Marijuana	Full text of measure	Proponent website	Opponent website	Rejected
9	Referendum on an Existing Law on an Act Modernizing Firearm Laws (Note: This measure is a veto referendum on a law already passed by the legislature. A "yes" vote means the law will be kept in place and a "no" vote means the law will be repealed.)	Full text of law	Keep law website	Repeal law website	Approved
Cit.
