= 2024 Massachusetts Governor's Council election =

2024 Massachusetts Governor's Council elections
- November 5, 2024

All 8 seats to the Massachusetts Governor's Council
	Majority party	Minority party
Party	Democratic	Republican
Last election	8	0
Seats won	8	0
Seat change	Steady	Steady
- Democrats: 40–50% 50–60% Unopposed

On November 5, 2024, an election was held to elect all 8 members to the Massachusetts Governor's Council. The election coincided with elections for other offices, including Electors of President and Vice President, U.S. Senator, U.S. House of Representatives, State Senators, State Representatives, Register of Deeds, Clerk of Courts, and County Commissioners (only certain counties).

The previous election saw Democrats maintain all 8 seats on the council. Councilor Robert Jubinville stepped down after being confirmed in December 2022 to serve as clerk magistrate for the Framingham District Court, and the district 2 seat remained vacant throughout the 2023–24 session.

== District 1 ==
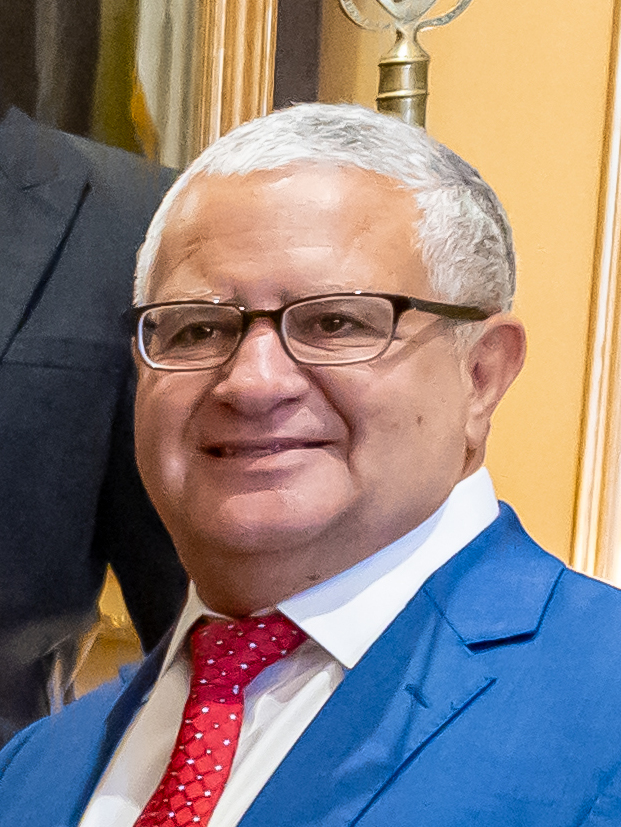
Joseph C. Ferreira (photographed in 2025) was re-elected

The 1st Governor's Council district is based in the southeastern part of the state and includes the Cape and the Islands. The incumbent was Democrat Joseph Ferreira, who was reelected with 97.4% of the vote in 2022 without major-party opposition.

=== Democratic primary ===
==== Candidates ====
- Joseph C. Ferreira, incumbent Governor's Councillor

==== Results ====
Democratic primary results
Party	Candidate	Votes	%
Democratic	Joseph C. Ferreira (incumbent)	68,546	99.6
Write-in		248	0.4
Total votes		68,794	100.0

=== Independent Candidates ===
- Krysten Condon

=== General election ===
==== Results ====
2024 Massachusetts's 1st Governor's Council district election
Party	Candidate	Votes	%
Democratic	Joseph C. Ferreira (incumbent)	242,015	56.4
Independent	Krysten Condon	185,805	43.3
Write-in		1,119	0.3
Total votes		238,939	100.0
Democratic hold			

== District 2 ==
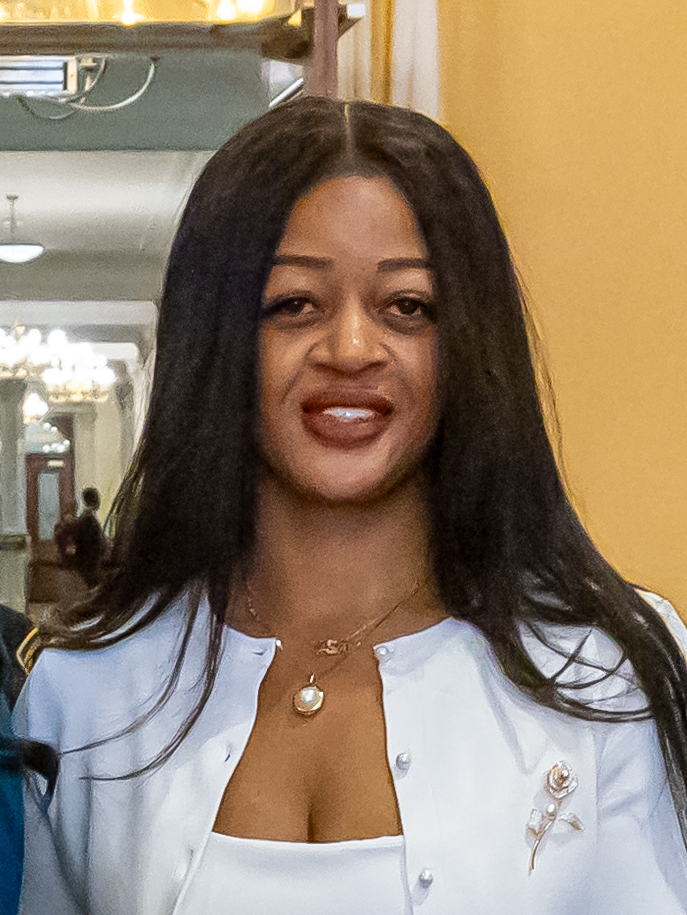
Tamisha Civil (photographed in 2025) won election

The 2nd Governor's Council district is in southeastern Massachusetts and includes cities like Attleboro. The district has been vacant since Robert Jubinville accepted a clerk magistrate position in 2022.

=== Democratic primary ===
==== Candidates ====
- Muriel Kramer, Hopkinton Board of Selectmen Chair and Veteran
- Tamisha Civil, candidate for state representative in 2020 and 2022
- Sean Murphy, attorney and Navy Veteran
- David Reservitz, attorney

==== Withdrawn ====
- Hunter Cohen, 2020 candidate for state representative, 9th Norfolk district (endorsed Reservitz)

=== Endorsements ===
Sean Murphy

State Legislators

- Rita Mendes, state representative for the 11th Plymouth district (2023-present)
- Gerard Cassidy, state representative for the 9th Plymouth district (2016-present)

Organizations and Other Individuals

- Local 4 International Union of Operating Engineers
- Norfolk County Central Labor Council AFL-CIO
- Local 7 Iron Workers
- United Brotherhood of Carpenters Local 723
- Sean Bentley, Milton Town Meeting Member
- David M. Ringius, Jr., Braintree Town Vice-President, Councilor-at-Large
- John "Jack" Lally, Brockton City Councilor Ward 6
- Maria Tavares, Brockton City Councilor Ward 2
- Philip Griffin, Brockton City Councilor Ward 3
- David Teixeira, Brockton City Councilor-at-Large
- Moises Rodrigues, Brockton City Councilor-at-Large
Muriel Kramer

State Legislators

- James Arena-DeRosa, state representative for the 8th Middlesex district (2023-present)
Tamisha Civil

Organizations

- SEIU-NAGE Local 229
Dave Reservitz

State Legislators

- Denise Garlick, state representative for the 13th Norfolk district (2011-present)

=== Fundraising ===
Campaign finance reports as of May 31, 2024
Candidate	Raised	Spent	Cash on hand
David Reservitz (D)	$103,086.00	$23,442.02	$79,644.36
Sean Murphy (D)	$15,645.00	$9,242.18	$5,917.57
Muriel Kramer (D)	$2,709.32	$86.76	$2,622.56
Tamisha Civil (D)	$6,855.95	$5,070.10	$1,785.85
Source: Office of Campaign and Political Finance

==== Results ====
Democratic primary results
Party	Candidate	Votes	%
Democratic	Tamisha Civil	27,702	38.7
Democratic	Sean Murphy	16,002	22.3
Democratic	Muriel Kramer	15,767	22.0
Democratic	David Reservitz	11,975	16.7
Write-in		155	0.2
Total votes		71,601	99.9

=== Republican primary ===
==== Candidates ====
- Francis Crimmins Jr.

==== Endorsements ====
Francis Crimmins Jr.

Elected Officials

- Alyson Sullivan, State Representative (2019-Present)
- David DeCoste, State Representative (2015-Present)
- Janet Leombruno, Framingham City Councilor At Large

Former Elected Officials

- Geoff Diehl, Former State Representative (2011-2019)
- Shawn Dooley, Former State Representative (2014-2022)

Labor Unions

- Massachusetts Fraternal Order of Police
- State Police Association of Massachusetts

Organizations

- Greater Boston Log Cabin Republicans

Newspapers

- The Franklin Observer

==== Results ====
Republican primary results
Party	Candidate	Votes	%
Republican	Francis Crimmins Jr.	22,357	99.0
Write-in		226	1.0
Total votes		22,583	100.0

=== General election ===
==== Results ====
2024 Massachusetts's 2nd Governor's Council district election
Party	Candidate	Votes	%
Democratic	Tamisha Civil	236,686	57.2
Republican	Francis Crimmins Jr.	176,372	42.6
Write-in		511	0.1
Total votes		413,569	99.9
Democratic hold			

== District 3 ==
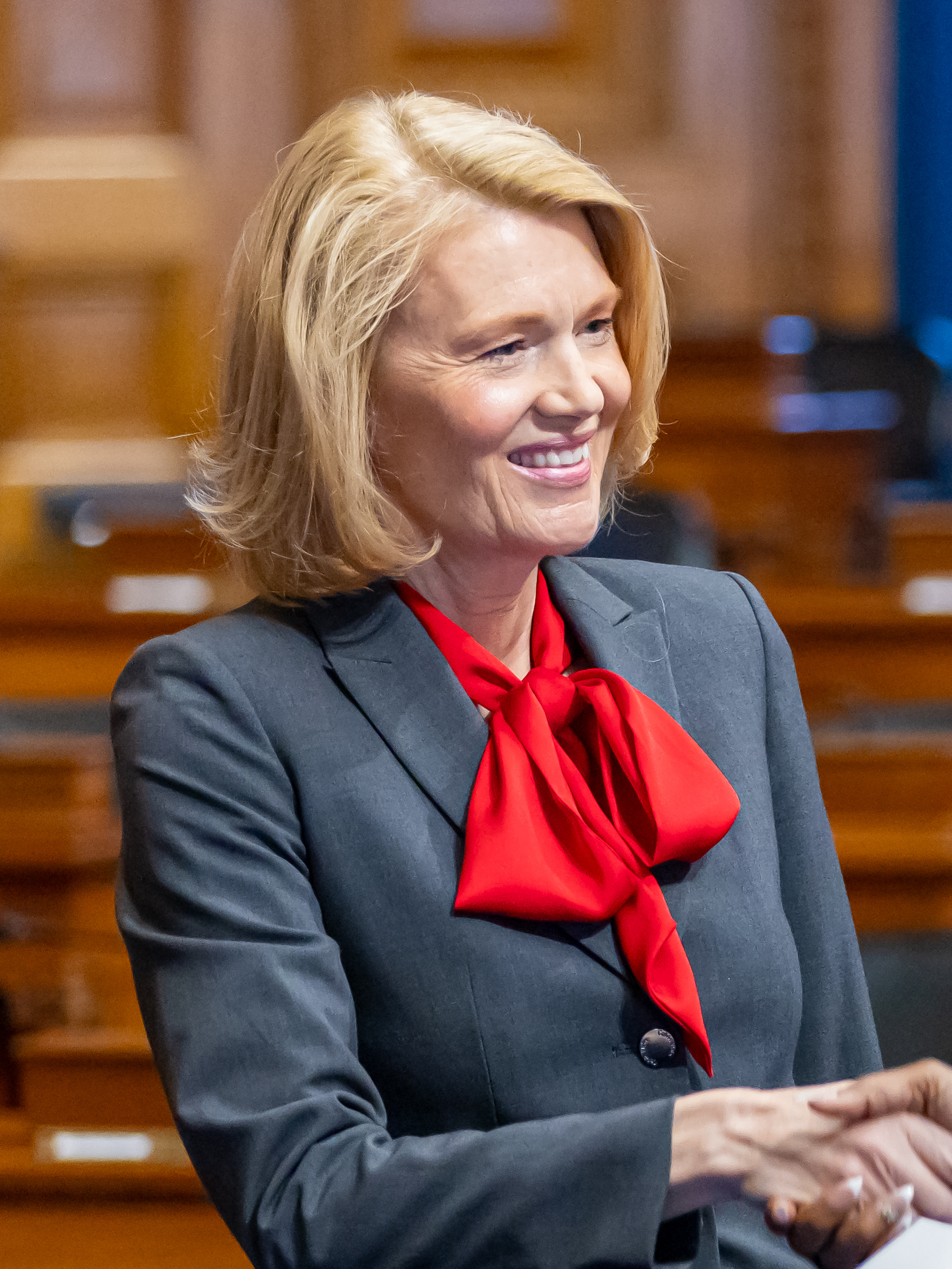
Mara Dolan (photographed in 2025) won election

The 3rd Governor's Council district is contained to eastern Massachusetts. The incumbent was Democrat Marilyn M. Petitto Devaney, who has represented the district since 1999. She was re-elected in the 2022 general election with 98.2% of the vote. In 2022, Devaney was challenged by public defender Mara Dolan in the Democratic primary, surviving the challenge by 1,658 votes. Dolan won the 2024 primary by 3,760 votes.

=== Democratic primary ===
==== Candidates ====
- Marilyn Petitto Devaney, incumbent Governor's Councillor
- Mara Dolan, public defender

==== Endorsements ====
Marilyn Petitto Devaney
Mara Dolan

Massachusetts Statewide Officers

- Seth Moulton, U.S. Representative from Massachusetts's 6th congressional district (2015–present)
- Diana DiZoglio, state auditor

State Senators

- William Brownsberger, state senator
- Mike Barrett, state senator
- Cindy Friedman, state senator
- Jamie Eldridge, state senator
- Rebecca Rausch, state senator

State Representatives

- Jim Arciero, state representative
- Tom Stanley, state representative
- John Lawn, state representative
- Alice Peisch, state representative
- Michelle Ciccolo, state representative
- Michael Moran, state representative
- Kenneth I. Gordon, state representative
- Richard Haggerty, state representative
- Danillo Sena, state representative
- Simon Cataldo, state representative
- Tommy Vitolo, state representative

Local Officials

- Kimberly Connors, Maynard Democratic Town Committee Chairwoman
- Danielle Allen, former gubernatorial candidate, Cambridge Ward 2 Democrats Chair
- Trey Fuccillo, Marlborough City Councilor

Organizations and Unions

- Stow Democratic Town Committee
- Our Revolution, Concord Area,
- Acton Democratic Town Committee
- Billerica Democratic Town Committee
- International Brotherhood of Electrical Workers, Local 103
- United Brotherhood of Carpenters and Joiners of America, Local 2168
- Brookline PAX

==== Results ====
Democratic primary results
Party	Candidate	Votes	%
Democratic	Mara Dolan	46,250	52.0
Democratic	Marilyn Petitto Devaney (incumbent)	42,580	47.9
Write-in		123	0.1
Total votes		88,953	100.0

=== General election ===
==== Results ====
2024 Massachusetts's 3rd Governor's Council district election
Party	Candidate	Votes	%
Democratic	Mara Dolan	330,523	98.7
Write-in		4,203	1.3
Total votes		334,726	100.0
Democratic hold			

== District 4 ==
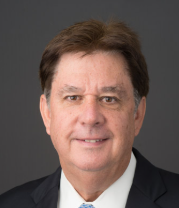
Christopher A. Ianella Jr. (photographed) was reelected

The 4th Governor's Council district contains much of Boston. The incumbent was Democrat Christopher A. Iannella, who has represented the district since 1993. He was re-elected in 2022 with 70.8% of the vote, defeating Republican Helene MacNeal.

=== Democratic primary ===
==== Candidates ====
- Christopher A. Iannella Jr., incumbent Governor's Councillor
- Stacey Borden
- Ronald Iacobucci

==== Results ====
Democratic primary results
Party	Candidate	Votes	%
Democratic	Christopher A. Iannella Jr. (incumbent)	41,849	56.4
Democratic	Stacey Borden	23,884	32.2
Democratic	Ronald Iacobucci	8,283	11.2
Write-in		123	0.1
Total votes		74,139	99.9

=== General election ===
==== Results ====
2024 Massachusetts's 4th Governor's Council district election
Party	Candidate	Votes	%
Democratic	Christopher A. Iannella Jr. (incumbent)	319,452	98.0
Write-in		6,459	2.0
Total votes		325,911	100.0
Democratic hold			

== District 5 ==
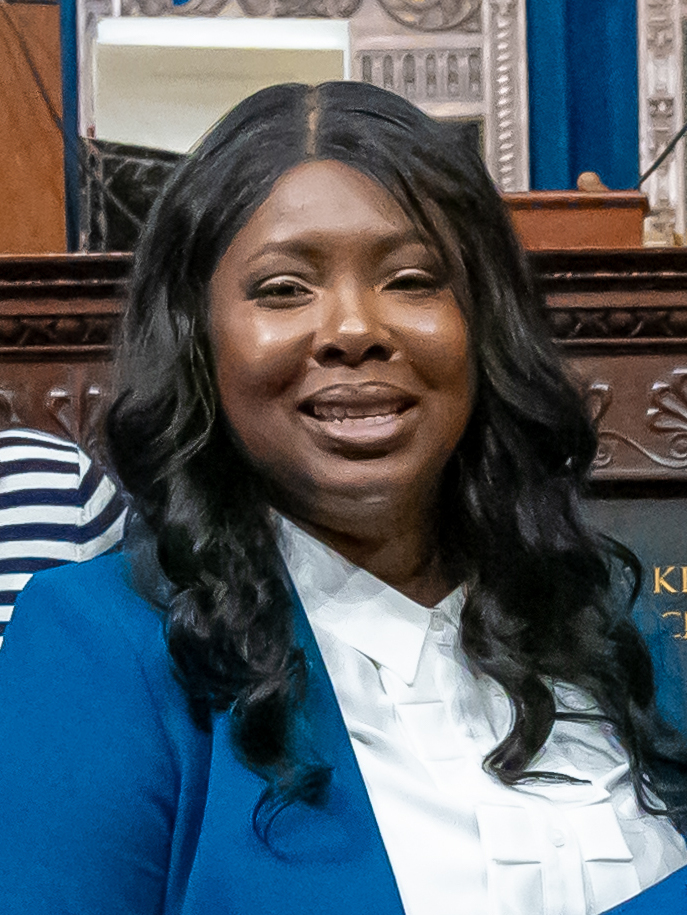
Eunice Zeigler (photographed in 2025) won election

The 5th Governor's Council district represents much of the North Shore. The incumbent Democrat Eileen Duff, who has represented the district since 2013, retired to run for Register of Deeds, Essex South.

=== Democratic primary ===
==== Nominee ====
- Eunice Zeigler, Methuen City Councilor

==== Endorsements ====
Eunice Zeigler

Elected Officials

- Eileen Duff, incumbent Governor's Councillor, District 5 (2013-present)

=== Fundraising ===
Campaign finance reports as of April 30, 2024
Candidate	Raised	Spent	Cash on hand
Eunice Zeigler (D)	$29,950.94	$10,153.50	$20,250.40
Source: Office of Campaign and Political Finance

==== Results ====
Democratic primary results
Party	Candidate	Votes	%
Democratic	Eunice Zeigler	55,871	99.4
Write-in		319	0.6
Total votes		56,190	100.0

=== Republican primary ===
==== Nominee ====
- Anne Manning-Martin, Peabody City Councilor

==== Endorsements ====
Anne Manning-Martin

Former Elected Officials

- Charlie Baker, Former Massachusetts Governor (2015-2023)

Labor Unions

- New England Police Benevolent Association
- Massachusetts Coalition of Police
- Teamsters Local 25

Organizations

- Greater Boston Log Cabin Republicans

==== Results ====
Republican primary results
Party	Candidate	Votes	%
Republican	Anne Manning-Martin	21,462	99.0
Write-in		224	1.0
Total votes		21,686	100.0

=== Independent Candidates ===
- Elliot Jody

=== General election ===
==== Results ====
2024 Massachusetts's 5th Governor's Council district election
Party	Candidate	Votes	%
Democratic	Eunice Zeigler	184,275	47.2
Republican	Anne Manning-Martin	158,961	40.7
Independent	Jody Elliott	46,634	11.9
Write-in		705	0.2
Total votes		390,575	100.0
Democratic hold			

== District 6 ==
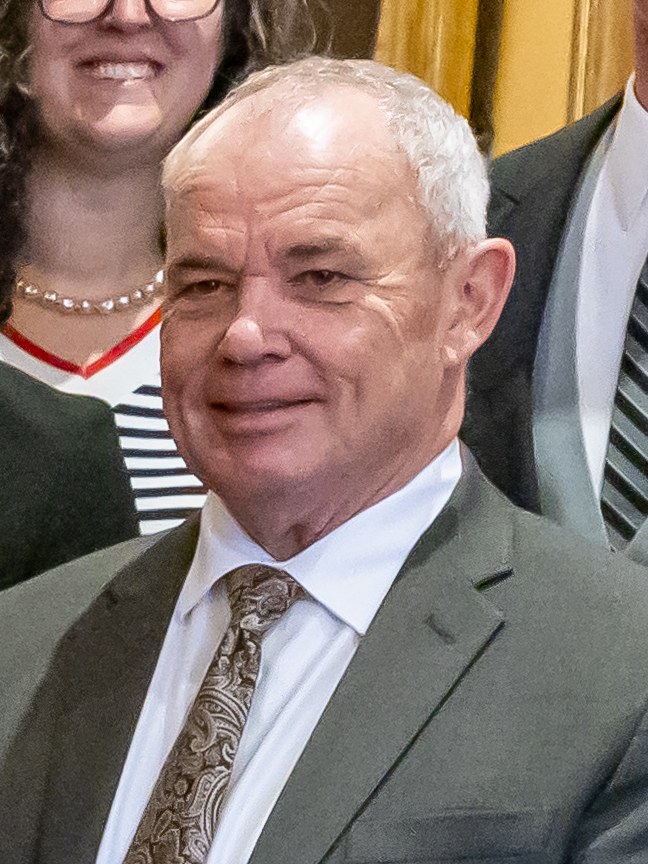
Terrence W. Kennedy (photographed in 2025) was re-elected

The 6th Governor's Council district represents cities and towns north of Boston. The incumbent was Democrat Terrence W. Kennedy, who has represented the district since 2012. He was re-elected in 2022 with 98.2% of the vote and without major-party opposition.

=== Democratic primary ===
==== Candidates ====
- Terrence W. Kennedy, incumbent Governor's Council Councillor

==== Results ====
Democratic primary results
Party	Candidate	Votes	%
Democratic	Terrence W. Kennedy (incumbent)	65,258	99.2
Write-in		556	0.8
Total votes		65,814	100.0

=== General election ===
==== Results ====
2024 Massachusetts's 6th Governor's Council district election
Party	Candidate	Votes	%
Democratic	Terrence W. Kennedy (incumbent)	282,836	98.1
Write-in		5,449	1.9
Total votes		288,285	100.0
Democratic hold			

== District 7 ==
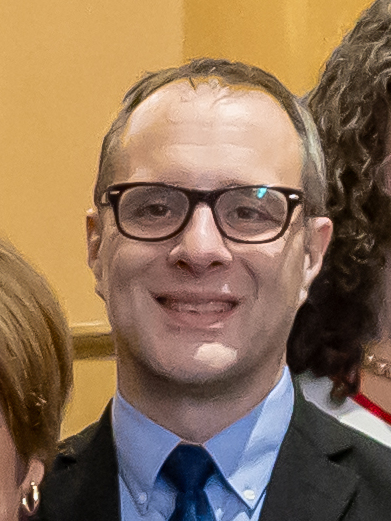
Paul DePalo (photographed in 2025) was re-elected

The 7th Governor's Council district represents much of central Massachusetts, including Worcester. The incumbent was Democrat Paul DePalo, who has represented the district since 2021. He was re-elected in 2022 with 57.0% of the vote.

=== Democratic primary ===
==== Candidates ====
- Paul DePalo, incumbent Governor's Council Councillor

==== Results ====
Democratic primary results
Party	Candidate	Votes	%
Democratic	Paul DePalo (incumbent)	49,094	99.6
Write-in		191	0.4
Total votes		49,285	100.0

=== Republican primary ===
==== Candidates ====
- Andrew Couture

==== Results ====
Republican primary results
Party	Candidate	Votes	%
Republican	Andrew Couture	24,763	99.3
Write-in		169	0.7
Total votes		24,932	100.0

=== General election ===
==== Results ====
2024 Massachusetts's 7th Governor's Council district election
Party	Candidate	Votes	%
Democratic	Paul DePalo (incumbent)	228,944	57.3
Republican	Andrew Couture	169,936	42.5
Write-in		565	0.1
Total votes		399,445	99.9
Democratic hold			

== District 8 ==
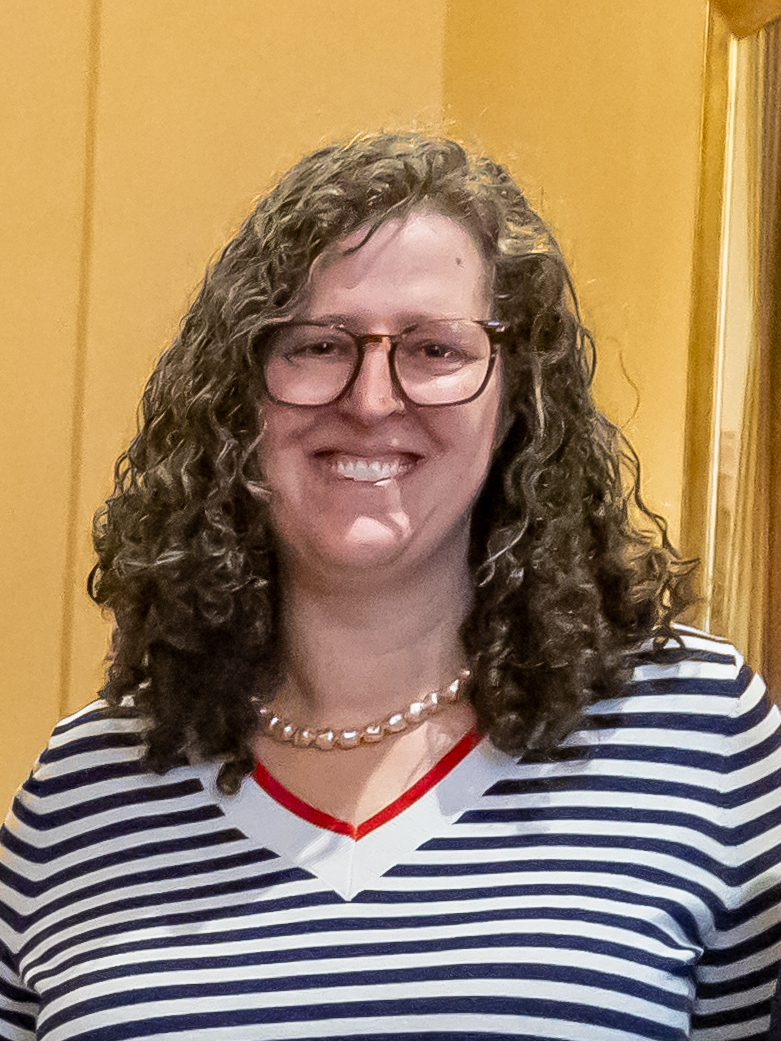
Tara J. Jacobs (photographed in 2025) was re-elected

The 8th Governor's Council district represents the majority of western Massachusetts. The district was represented by Tara J. Jacobs since 2022. Jacobs was elected in 2022 with 99.4% of the vote.

=== Democratic primary ===
==== Candidates ====
- Tara J. Jacobs, incumbent Governor's Council Councillor

==== Results ====
Democratic primary results
Party	Candidate	Votes	%
Democratic	Tara J. Jacobs (incumbent)	61,765	99.4
Write-in		375	0.6
Total votes		62,140	100.0

=== General election ===
==== Results ====
2024 Massachusetts's 8th Governor's Council district election
Party	Candidate	Votes	%
Democratic	Tara J. Jacobs (incumbent)	61,765	99.4
Write-in		375	0.6
Total votes		62,140	100.0
Democratic hold			
