= 2022 Massachusetts Governor's Council election =

2022 Massachusetts Governor's Council elections
- November 8, 2022

All 8 seats to the Massachusetts Governor's Council
	Majority party	Minority party
Party	Democratic	Republican
Last election	8	0
Seats won	8	0
Seat change	Steady	Steady
Popular vote	1,593,562	544,044
Percentage	74.55%	25.45%
Swing	▼	▲
- Democrats: 50–60% 60–70% 70–80% Unopposed

An election was held on November 8, 2022, to elect all eight members to the Massachusetts Governor's Council. The election coincided with elections for other offices, including governor and U.S. House of Representatives.

Democrats maintained all eight seats on the council and flipped the lieutenant governor seat, which presides over the council. Simultaneously with gains in the general court, state senate and Maura Healey's win in the gubernatorial race, Democrats won a trifecta in the state for the first time since 2010.

== District 1 ==
2022 Massachusetts's 1st Governor's Council district election
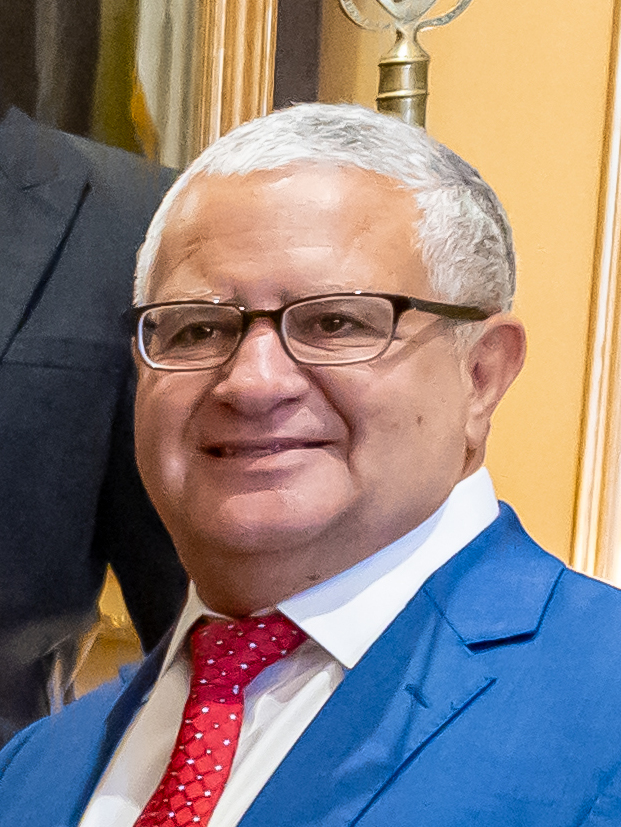
Nominee	Joseph C. Ferreira
Party	Democratic
Popular vote	74,816
Percentage	99.8%
Governor's Councillor before election
Joseph C. Ferreira
Democratic
Elected Governor's Councillor
Joseph C. Ferreira
Democratic

The 1st Governor's Council district is based in the southeastern part of the state and includes the Cape and the Islands. The incumbent was Democrat Joseph Ferreira, who was reelected with 98.4% of the vote in 2020 without major-party opposition.

=== Democratic primary ===
==== Nominee ====
- Joseph C. Ferreira, incumbent Governor's Council councillor

==== Results ====
Democratic primary results
Party	Candidate	Votes	%
Democratic	Joseph C. Ferreria (incumbent)	71,816	99.8
Write-in		154	0.2
Total votes		72,534	100.0

=== Republican primary ===
No candidates appeared on the Republican primary ballot.

Republican primary results
Party	Candidate	Votes	%
Republican	Mark I. Holt (write-in)	46	2.1
Republican	Mary E. Chalke (write-in)	39	1.8
Write-in		2,141	96.2
Total votes		26,274	100.0

=== General election ===
==== Results ====
2022 Governor's Council general election, 1st District
Party	Candidate	Votes	%
Democratic	Joseph C. Ferreira (incumbent)	232,118	97.4
Write-in		6,177	2.6
Total votes		238,295	100.0
Democratic hold			

== District 2 ==
The 2nd Governor's Council district is in southeastern Massachusetts and includes cities like Attleboro. The incumbent was Democrat Robert Jubinville, who was reelected with 98.6% of the vote in 2020 without major-party opposition.

=== Democratic primary ===
==== Nominee ====
- Robert Jubinville, incumbent Governor's Council councillor

==== Results ====
Democratic primary results
Party	Candidate	Votes	%
Democratic	Robert Jubinville (incumbent)	69,726	99.7
Write-in		226	0.3
Total votes		91,239	100.0

=== Republican primary ===
==== Nominee ====
No candidates appeared on the Republican primary ballot.

==== Results ====
Republican primary results
Party	Candidate	Votes	%
Republican	Dashe M. Videira (write-in)	1,093	42.3
Write-in		1,489	57.7
Total votes		2,582	100.0

=== General election ===
==== Results ====
2022 Governor's Council general election, 2nd District
Party	Candidate	Votes	%
Democratic	Robert Jubinville (incumbent)	194,480	63.2
Republican	Dashe M. Videira	112,941	36.7
Write-in		183	0.1
Total votes		307,604	100.0
Democratic hold			

== District 3 ==
The 3rd Governor's Council district is contained to eastern Massachusetts. The incumbent was Democrat Marilyn M. Petitto Devaney, who had represented the district since 1999. She was re-elected in 2020 with 98.5% of the vote and without major-party opposition.

=== Democratic primary ===
==== Nominees ====
- Marilyn Petitto Devaney, incumbent Governor's Council councillor
- Mara Dolan, public defender

==== Endorsements ====
Mara Dolan

Massachusetts statewide officers

- Suzanne Bump, Massachusetts state auditor (2011–2023)
- Eileen Duff, Massachusetts 5th Governor's Council district (2013–present)
- Steve Grossman
- Mary Hurley, Massachusetts 8th Governor's Council district (2017–2023)
- Seth Moulton, U.S. representative from Massachusetts's 6th congressional district (2015–present)

State senators

- Mike Barrett, state senator
- William Brownsberger, state senator
- Cindy Friedman, state senator

State representatives

- Jim Arciero, state representative
- Cory Atkins, former state representative
- Michelle Ciccolo, state representative
- Kenneth I. Gordon, state representative
- Jay Kaufman, former state representative
- John Lawn, state representative
- Michael Moran, state representative
- Alice Peisch, state representative
- Dave Rogers, state representative
- Tom Stanley, state representative

Local officials

- Angus Ambercrombie, Belmont town meeting member (2023–present)
- Alicia Bowman, Newton city councilor
- Michael Burstein, Brookline library trustee and town meeting member
- Frank Cousins Jr., former Essex County sheriff
- Deborah Crossley, Newton city councilor
- Becky Grossman, Newton city councilor, 2020 candidate for Massachusetts's 4th congressional district
- Andreae Downs, Newton city councilor
- Andrea Kelly, Newton city councilor
- Alison Leary, Newton city councilor
- Richard Lipof, Newton city councilor
- Joe Pato, Lexington selectboard member
- Holly Ryan, Newton city councilor
- John VanScoyoc, Brookline selectboard member

Organizations and unions

- Boston International Longshoremen's Association
- Brookline PAX
- IBEW Local 103
- Iron Workers Local 7
- Massachusetts State Police Association
- Merrimack Valley Central Labor Council
- Our Revolution Massachusetts affiliates from Arlington, Cambridge, Concord, and MetroWest
- Progressive Democrats of Massachusetts
- Young Democrats of Massachusetts

==== Results ====
Democratic primary results
Party	Candidate	Votes	%
Democratic	Marilyn Petitto Devaney (incumbent)	50,960	50.8
Democratic	Mara Dolan	49,302	49.1
Write-in		107	0.1
Total votes		100,369	100.0

=== Republican primary ===
==== Nominee ====
No candidates appeared on the Republican primary ballot.

==== Results ====
Republican primary results
Party	Candidate	Votes	%
Republican	Frederick Glynn (write-in)	122	8.7
Republican	Mark I. Holt (write-in)	51	3.6
Write-in		1,226	87.6
Total votes		1,399	100.0

=== General election ===
==== Results ====
2022 Governor's Council general election, 3rd District
Party	Candidate	Votes	%
Democratic	Marilyn Petitto Devaney (incumbent)	248,736	98.2
Write-in		4,456	1.8
Total votes		253,192	100.0
Democratic hold			

== District 4 ==
The 4th Governor's Council district contains much of Boston. The incumbent was Democrat Christopher A. Iannella, who had represented the district since 1993. He was re-elected in 2020 with 98.6% of the vote and without major-party opposition.

=== Democratic primary ===
==== Nominee ====
- Christopher A. Iannella Jr., incumbent Governor's Council councillor

==== Results ====
Democratic primary results
Party	Candidate	Votes	%
Democratic	Christopher A. Iannella, Jr. (incumbent)	81,092	99.2
Write-in		672	0.8
Total votes		81,764	100.0

=== Republican primary ===
==== Nominee ====
- Helene MacNeal

==== Results ====
Republican primary results
Party	Candidate	Votes	%
Republican	Helene MacNeal	20,454	99.2
Write-in		169	0.8
Total votes		20,623	100.0

=== General election ===
==== Results ====
2022 Governor's Council general election, 4th District
Party	Candidate	Votes	%
Democratic	Christopher A. Iannella, Jr. (incumbent)	205,182	70.8
Republican	Helene MacNeal	84,005	29.0
Write-in		418	0.1
Total votes		289,605	100.0
Democratic hold			

== District 5 ==
The 5th Governor's Council district represents much of the North Shore. The incumbent was Democrat Eileen Duff, who had represented the district since 2013. She was re-elected in 2020 with 98.1% of the vote and without major-party opposition.

=== Democratic primary ===
==== Nominee ====
- Eileen R. Duff, incumbent Governor's Council councillor

==== Endorsements ====
Eileen Duff

Massachusetts statewide officials

- Diana DiZoglio, Massachusetts state auditor (2023–present), state senator from Massachusetts Senate's 1st Essex district (2019–2023), state representative from Massachusetts House of Representatives' 14th Essex district (2013–2019)
- Seth Moulton, U.S. representative from Massachusetts's 6th congressional district (2015–present)
- Nikki Tsongas, U.S. representative from Massachusetts's 3rd congressional district (2013–2018)

State representatives

- Brian Dempsey, state representative from Massachusetts House of Representatives' 3rd Essex district (1991–2017)
- Colleen Garry, state representative from Massachusetts House of Representatives' 36th Middlesex district (2003–present), state representative from Massachusetts House of Representatives' 39th Middlesex district (1995–2003)

Local officials

- Ted Bettencourt, mayor of Peabody, (2011–present)
- Kimberley Driscoll, mayor of Salem
- Sefatia Romeo Theken, mayor of Gloucester (2016–2022)

Newspapers

- Gloucester Times
- Lowell Sun
- The Salem News

==== Results ====
Democratic primary results
Party	Candidate	Votes	%
Democratic	Eileen R. Duff (incumbent)	74,172	99.6
Write-in		299	0.4
Total votes		74,471	100.0

=== Republican primary ===
==== Nominee ====
- Michael C. Walsh

===== Endorsements =====
Michael Walsh
- Massachusetts Republican Party
- James J. Lyons Jr., chair of MassGOP (2019–2023)

==== Results ====
Republican primary results
Party	Candidate	Votes	%
Republican	Michael C. Walsh	28,597	99.5
Write-in		141	0.5
Total votes		28,738	100.0

=== General election ===
==== Results ====
2022 Governor's Council general election, 5th District
Party	Candidate	Votes	%
Democratic	Eileen R. Duff (incumbent)	175,894	59.6
Republican	Michael C. Walsh	119,175	40.4
Write-in		207	0.1
Total votes		295,276	100.0
Democratic hold			

== District 6 ==
The 6th Governor's Council district represents cities and towns north of Boston. The incumbent was Democrat Terrence W. Kennedy, who had represented the district since 2012. He was re-elected in 2020 with 98.2% of the vote and without major-party opposition.

=== Democratic primary ===
==== Nominee ====
- Terrence W. Kennedy, incumbent Governor's Council councillor

==== Results ====
2022 Governor's Council Democratic Primary 6th District
Party	Candidate	Votes	%
Democratic	Terrence W. Kennedy (incumbent)	74,191	99.2
Write-in		598	0.8
Total votes		74,789	100.0

=== Republican primary ===
No candidates appeared on the Republican primary ballot.

=== General election ===
==== Results ====
2022 Governor's Council general election, 6th District
Party	Candidate	Votes	%
Democratic	Terrence W. Kennedy (incumbent)	203,576	98.2
Write-in		3,666	1.8
Total votes		207,242	100.0
Democratic hold			

== District 7 ==
The 7th Governor's Council district represents much of central Massachusetts, including Worcester. The incumbent was Democrat Paul DePalo, who had represented the district since 2021. He was re-elected in 2020 with 97.4% of the vote and without major-party opposition.

=== Democratic primary ===
==== Nominee ====
- Paul DePalo, incumbent Governor's Council councillor

==== Results ====
Democratic primary results
Party	Candidate	Votes	%
Democratic	Paul DePalo (incumbent)	81,092	99.2
Write-in		672	0.8
Total votes		81,764	100.0

=== Republican primary ===
==== Nominee ====
- Gary Galonek

==== Results ====
2022 Governor's Council Republican primary, 7th District
Party	Candidate	Votes	%
Republican	Gary Galonek	30,303	99.6
Write-in		127	0.4
Total votes		30,430	100.0

=== General election ===
==== Results ====
2022 Governor's Council general election, 7th District
Party	Candidate	Votes	%
Democratic	Paul DePalo (incumbent)	163,456	57.0
Republican	Gary Galonek	123,084	42.9
Write-in		157	0.1
Total votes		286,697	100.0
Democratic hold			

== District 8 ==
The 8th Governor's Council district represents the majority of western Massachusetts. The incumbent was Democrat Mary E. Hurley, who had represented the district since 2017. In March 2022, Hurley announced that she would not seek reelection to the Governor's Council. The Democratic primary was held on September 6, 2022. North Adams School Committee member Tara Jacobs won in a four-way race with 33.0% of the vote against Springfield City Councilor Michael Anthony Fenton (30.2%), Shawn Allyn of Holyoke (20.4%) and Jeffrey Morneau of East Longmeadow (16.3%). Jacobs went on to win the general election against Republican John Comerford of Palmer with 61.8% of the vote and was inaugurated on January 5, 2023.

=== Democratic primary ===
==== Nominees ====
- Shawn P. Allyn, attorney
- Michael Anthony Fenton, Springfield city councillor
- Tara J. Jacobs, North Adams School Committee member
- Jeffrey S. Morneau, lawyer

==== Endorsements ====
Michael Anthony Fenton

Elected officials

- Mike Ashe, former Hampden County sheriff
- Anthony Gulluni, Hampden district attorney
- Mary Hurley, Massachusetts 8th Governor's Council district (2017–2023)
- Richard Neal, U.S. representative from Massachusetts's 1st congressional district

Organizations and unions

- Carpenters Local 336
- IBEW Local 7
- IW Local 7
- LiUNA Laborers' Union Local 999
- Pioneer Valley Building Trades Union
- Sheet Metal Local 63
- Western Mass Area Labor Federation

==== Results ====
Democratic primary results
Party	Candidate	Votes	%
Democratic	Tara J. Jacobs	28,504	33.0
Democratic	Michael Anthony Fenton	26,139	30.2
Democratic	Shawn P. Allyn	17,662	20.4
Democratic	Jeffrey S. Morneau	14,055	16.3
Write-in		99	0.1
Total votes		86,459	100.0

=== Republican primary ===
==== Nominee ====
- John M. Comerford, former veterans' agent

==== Results ====
Republican primary results
Party	Candidate	Votes	%
Republican	John M. Comerford	20,658	99.3
Write-in		150	.7
Total votes		20,808	100.0

=== General election ===
==== Endorsements ====
Tara J. Jacobs

Statewide office holders and candidates

- Andrea J. Campbell, former Boston city councilor and candidate for attorney general
- Diana DiZoglio, state senator (1st Essex District) and candidate for auditor
- Kim Driscoll, mayor of Salem, and candidate for lt. governor
- Eileen Duff, Massachusetts 5th Governor's Council district (2013–present)
- William F. Galvin, secretary of the commonwealth
- Deb Goldberg, Massachusetts treasurer and receiver general
- Maura Healey, Massachusetts attorney general and candidate for governor
- Mary Hurley, Massachusetts 8th Governor's Council district (2017–2023)
- Richard Neal, U.S. representative from Massachusetts's 1st congressional district

County officials

- Tom Bowler, Berkshire County sheriff
- Patrick Cahillane, Hampshire County sheriff
- Nick Cocchi, Hampden County sheriff
- Chris Donelan, Franklin County sheriff
- Timothy Shugrue, Berkshire County district attorney
- David Sullivan, Northwestern (Hampshire/Franklin) district attorney

State senators

- Jo Comerford, Hampshire, Franklin and Worcester district
- Adam Gomez, Hampden district
- Eric Lesser, 1st Hampshire and Hampden district
- John Velis, 2nd Hampshire and Hampden district

State representatives

- Brian Ashe, 2nd Hampden district
- Dan Bosley, former representative for the 1st Berkshire district
- Mindy Domb, 3rd Hampshire district
- Pat Duffy, 5th Hampden district
- Tricia Farley-Bouvier, 3rd Berkshire district
- Carlos González, 10th Hampden district
- Sherwood Guernsey, former representative for the 2nd Berkshire district
- Paul Mark, 2nd Berkshire
- Jake Oliveira, 7th Hampden district
- Angelo Puppolo, 12th Hampden district
- Orlando Ramos, 9th Hampden district
- Lindsay Sabadosa, 1st Hampshire district
- Aaron Saunders, candidate for 7th Hampden
- Bud Williams, 11th Hampden district

Unions and organizations

- Amalgamated Transit Union Local 448
- Emily's List
- IBEW Local 7
- Massachusetts Women's Political Caucus
- Pioneer Valley Building Trades Council
- Sheet Metal Workers Local 63
- Teamsters Local 404
- UAW Region 9A
- UFCW Local 1459
- VoteMama
- Western MA Area Labor Federation
- Young Democrats of Massachusetts

Media

- Berkshire Eagle
- Springfield Republican

==== Results ====
2022 Governor's Council general election, 8th District
Party	Candidate	Votes	%
Democratic	Tara J. Jacobs	170,120	61.8
Republican	John M. Comerford	104,839	38.1
Write-in		235	.1
Total votes		275,194	100.0
Democratic hold			
