= Christopher Iannella =

Christopher Iannella may refer to:

- Christopher A. Iannella (1913–1992), member of the Boston City Council, Boston, Massachusetts
- Christopher Iannella Jr. (born 1952), his son, American attorney and politician
