= Ruth E. Nemzoff =

American politician

Member of the New Hampshire House of Representatives from the Hillsborough 18th district
- In office 1976–1982

Personal details
- Born: December 10, 1940 (age 85) Boston, Massachusetts, U.S.
- Party: Democratic
- Spouse: Harris Berman (m. 1964; died 2021)
- Education: Barnard College (BA); Columbia University (MA); Harvard University (EdD)

Ruth Esther Nemzoff (born December 10, 1940) is an American author and politician who represented the Hillsborough 18th district in the New Hampshire House of Representatives from 1976 to 1982. She later served as the state's deputy commissioner of health and welfare and worked in the government department at Bentley College.

Nemzoff is currently a resident scholar at the Brandeis University Women's Studies Research Center.

== Early life and education ==
Nemzoff was born on December 10, 1940 in Boston. Her father, Samuel Nemzoff, was principal of the Temple Israel Hebrew School in Boston from 1930 to 1970 and her mother, Sophie Nemzoff, was a member of the local parent–teacher association. Nemzoff received her Bachelor of Arts from Barnard College in 1962 and her Master of Arts from the Teachers College, Columbia University in 1964. That same year, she married Harris Berman. They had four children together and remained married until his death in 2021. In 1979, she received her Doctor of Education from the Harvard Graduate School of Education.

== Politics ==
During the 1970s, Nemzoff resided in Nashua, New Hampshire, where she was active in religious and consciousness raising groups. In 1973, she helped start a regional counseling service for women. In 1974, Nemzoff was elected to the New Hampshire House of Representatives. She was the first pregnant woman to serve there. During her time in the legislature, Nemzoff sponsored legislation that provided scholarship money to displaced homemakers and opened adoption records.

Following the passage of the Education Amendments of 1972, Nemzoff worked with the American Personnel and Guidance Association to develop teams to implement Title IX. In 1980, she was hired to start the sex equity section in the New Hampshire Department of Education's equal opportunity office. Two years later she became the first woman to serve as New Hampshire's deputy commissioner of health and welfare.

From 1996 to 2000, Nemzoff was the gender issues coordinator at Bentley College. In 1998, she was a candidate for the 3rd district seat on the Massachusetts Governor's Council. She came in second in the eight-candidate Democratic primary – finishing only 360 votes behind winner Marilyn Petitto Devaney. Nemzoff ran again in 2000, but lost to Devaney again, this time by a 3,702 vote margin.

== Writing & Books ==
Nemzoff has written two books on family relationships, Don't Bite Your Tongue: How to Foster Rewarding Relationships with Your Adult Children (2008) and Don't Roll Your Eyes: Making In-Laws Into Family (2012), both published by Palgrave Macmillan.

She has also written advice columns on family relationships, including for The American Israelite and the "Seesaw" column of The Forward.
