= 2006 Massachusetts Governor's Council election =

Elections for the Massachusetts Governor's Council were held on November 7, 2006. Candidates from the Democratic Party were elected or re-elected to all eight districts.

The Governor's Council (also known as the Executive Council) of Massachusetts is a popularly elected board which must, among its duties, approve or disapprove of the governor's judicial nominations, pardons, and commutations. The councillors are elected every two years from eight councillor districts across the Commonwealth. The lieutenant governor of Massachusetts serves as an ex officio member. The 2006 Massachusetts Gubernatorial election was held on the same date as the Council election, as well as other State and Federal elections.

== Election results ==
=== District One ===
For this election, District One comprised all of Barnstable, Dukes, Nantucket Counties and portions of Bristol and Plymouth.

Massachusetts Governor's Council election, District 1, 2006
Party	Candidate	Votes	%
Democratic	Carole Fiola	159,286	57.8
Republican	Philip Paleologos	89,263	32.4
Unenrolled	Paul Viveros	26,895	9.8
Total votes		275,444	100%

=== District Two ===
For this election, District Two comprised portions of Bristol, Middlesex, Norfolk, Plymouth, and Suffolk Counties.

Massachusetts Governor's Council election, District 2, 2006
Party	Candidate	Votes	%
Democratic	Kelly Timilty	182,379	67.0
Republican	William McCue	89,667	33.0
Total votes		272,046	100%

=== District Three ===
District Three comprised portions of Middlesex, Norfolk, Suffolk, and Worcester Counties.

Massachusetts Governor's Council election, District 3, 2006
Party	Candidate	Votes	%
Democratic	Marilyn Petitto Devaney (unopposed)	189,560	100.0

=== District Four ===
District Four comprised portions of Bristol, Norfolk, Plymouth and Suffolk Counties.

Massachusetts Governor's Council election, District 4, 2006
Party	Candidate	Votes	%
Democratic	Christopher A. Iannella (unopposed)	188,953	100.0

=== District Five ===
District Five comprised portions of Essex, and Middlesex Counties.

Massachusetts Governor's Council election, District 5, 2006
Party	Candidate	Votes	%
Democratic	Mary-Ellen Manning	166,141	67.2
Unenrolled	Timothy Houten	80,960	32.8
Total votes		247,101	100%

- District 6 (Portions of Essex, and Middlesex, and Suffolk Counties)
  - Democratic Incumbent Michael J. Callahan: 143,221
  - Republican Candidate William Barabino: 44,893
  - Unenrolled Candidate Rosemary A. Macero: 19,193
  - Unenrolled Candidate Ted Sarandis former WEEI talk show host: 17,795
- District 7 (Portions of Franklin, Hampden, Hampshire, Middlesex, Norfolk, and Worcester Counties)
  - Democratic Incumbent Dennis P. McManus - Not running for re-election
  - Democratic Candidate Brian J. Buckley - Lost in primary election
  - Democratic Candidate Daniel S. O'Connor - Lost in primary election
  - Democratic Candidate Thomas J. Foley - Party nominee: 201,541
  - Democratic Candidate Brian D'Andrea - Lost in primary election
  - Democratic Candidate[John Burke - Lost in primary election
- District 8 (All of Berkshire, and portions of Franklin, Hampden, and Hampshire Counties)
  - Democratic Incumbent Peter Vickery - Lost in Primary election
  - Democratic Candidate Thomas Merrigan: 133,601
  - Republican Candidate Michael Franco: 48,993
  - Unenrolled Candidate Michael Kogut: 45,544
  - Democratic Challenger Rinaldo Del Gallo III (withdrew before ballot)
