= Geraldo Alicea =

American politician

Member of the Massachusetts House of Representatives from the 6th Worcester District
- In office 2007–2011
- Preceded by: Mark Carron
- Succeeded by: Peter Durant

Personal details
- Born: September 27, 1963 (age 62) Southbridge, Massachusetts
- Party: Democratic
- Spouse: Rosemarie Alicea
- Education: Westfield State College; Anna Maria College
- Occupation: Politician

Geraldo Alicea (born September 27, 1963 in Southbridge, Massachusetts) is an American politician who represented the 6th Worcester District in the Massachusetts House of Representatives from 2007 to 2011.

== 2010 election and 2011 special election ==
The 2010 election for the 6th Worcester seat resulted in an exact tie between Alicea and Republican opponent Peter Durant. A special election for the seat was scheduled for May 10, 2011. Alicea was allowed to hold the seat until the results of the new election.

Alicea lost the special election to Durant by 56 votes (3,325 to 3,269).
