= Harris Berman =

American physician (died 2021)

- Born: May 30, 1938; Concord, New Hampshire, U.S.
- Died: October 30, 2021 (aged 83); Boston, Massachusetts, U.S.
- Education: Harvard University (BA); Columbia University (MD)
- Occupation: Physician
- Known for: Dean of Tufts University School of Medicine
- Spouse: Ruth E. Nemzoff (m. 1964)

Harris Alan Berman (May 30, 1938 – October 30, 2021) was an American physician who was the dean of the Tufts University School of Medicine.

== Early life and education ==
Berman was born on May 30, 1938 in Concord, New Hampshire. He completed his undergraduate education at Harvard College and graduated from the Columbia University College of Physicians and Surgeons in 1964. He completed his residency in internal medicine and a fellowship in infectious disease at Tufts Medical Center.

== Career ==
=== First contributions ===
After finishing his fellowship, he and Jim Squires, a friend just out of his general surgery residency, along with three other physicians, co-founded the Matthew Thornton Health Plan, one of the first health maintenance organizations in New England. The organization would grow to service 60,000 people by the mid-1980s;

=== Tufts ===
In 1986, Berman left Matthew Thornton and joined Tufts University School of Medicine as a professor of public health and community medicine. At the same time, he became the chief executive officer of Tufts Health Plan, which grew from 60,000 members to over a million members in his 17-year tenure. From 2003 to 2008, he served as the chair of the Department of Public Health and Community Medicine, and eventually became the dean of public health and professional degree programs before being appointed vice dean of the medical school in 2008. In December 2009, he was appointed dean ad interim for the School of Medicine and was formally appointed to the position of dean in October 2011.

== Personal life ==
Berman died on October 30, 2021, at the age of 83. He was survived by his wife, Ruth E. Nemzoff, four children, eleven grandchildren, and a sister.
