= Massachusetts Committee for Public Counsel Services =

In Massachusetts, the Committee for Public Counsel Services (CPCS) oversees the state public defender system for indigent criminal defendants.

== Organization and responsibilities ==
Some attorneys are public defenders employed by the Committee itself. Others are private criminal defense attorneys appointed by the courts to represent indigent defendants known as Bar Advocates.

CPCS has several divisions: a Private Counsel Division, a Public Defender division, a Youth Advocacy division, and a Mental Health Litigation Division. It also operates an Innocence Program representing those who are wrongfully convicted. In addition to overseeing public defense services for defendants at trial, the committee also assigns counsel to represent inmates in parole hearings.

CPCS's main office is at 75 Federal Street, Boston. It has 20 regional offices across the commonwealth.

== History ==
CPCS was established in 1983 by the Massachusetts Legislature in Chapter 673 of the Acts of 1983. It consolidated scattered previous programs including the Massachusetts Defenders Committee (MDC) (a public defender program established in 1960), the County Bar Advocate Program (a court-appointed counsel program affiliated with bar associations in most Massachusetts counties), and the Roxbury Defenders Committee (RDC), a private non-profit that worked in the Roxbury District Court and the Suffolk Superior Court.

In 2008, CPCS had 253 staffers, with an estimated 3,000 private attorneys on the list of lawyers approved to be appointed counsel. In 2018, CPCS has approximately 500 staff attorneys and 3,000 private attorneys certified to accept appointments. In the period 2019–2022, CPCS had an estimated 868 employees and 16 unpaid interns (includes employees who left the organization during this period).

As of 2008, private attorneys assigned to represent indigents were paid an hourly rate of $100 for murder cases, $60 for Superior Court cases, and $50 for district court cases.

Public defenders and other CPCS employees, such as investigators, have repeatedly but unsuccessfully attempted to unionize; efforts in 2015 and 2018 to form a bargaining unit failed. A 2014 study by the Massachusetts Bar Association found that Massachusetts had the lowest-paid public defenders in the country. In 2017, thousands of private court-appointed attorneys in Massachusetts were not paid for weeks for their services; the legislature ultimately approved retroactive funds to compensate them.

After the Annie Dookhan scandal (in which a Massachusetts drug lab chemist falsified test results, implicating many defendants), CPCS as well as the ACLU of Massachusetts, advocated for the dismissal of cases. In 2017, approximately 6,000 drug cases were dismissed because of the misconduct, although the Massachusetts Supreme Judicial Court declined CPCS's request for wholesale dismissal of all cases linked.

In 2019, CPCS's servers were targeted by a ransomware attack, disrupting operations; it took around 10 business days for data to be fully restored.

On May 27, 2025, Bar Advocates (private court-appointed attorneys employed by CPCS) went on strike seeking higher pay. In 2025, those private attorneys handled around 80% of cases, with only 20% handled by the full-time public defenders employed by CPCS. Massachusetts pays Bar Advocates the lowest rate in New England, with Massachusetts Bar Advocates being paid $65 per hour compared to the $150 hourly rate in Maine and $125 hourly rate in New Hampshire. Bar Advocates do not have a formal union. The strike led to over 1,300 people being sent to court without a lawyer within a month of the work stoppage. As the strike continued, over 120 criminal cases were dismissed under the Lavallee protocol because defendants lacked legal representation. Since the strike was not organized by a union, lawyers did not return to work all at once. In August, a $20 pay raise was signed into law by governor Maura Healey. Bar Advocates argued for a higher $35 raise. By February 2026, the crisis had mostly subsided as the state managed to hire new lawyers and convince some Bar Advocates to return to work using financial incentives, leading to all defendants who required representation receiving it. However, some Bar Advocates still continued the work stoppage.

In January 2026, a ballot question to allow CPCS employees to unionize was certified. The question has until May to either be passed as is by the state legislature or passed in a different form as a compromise with the organizers of the question. If the legislature does not act, organizers will need to gather more signatures to place the question on the November ballot.
