= 2026 Massachusetts State Auditor election =

- November 3, 2026
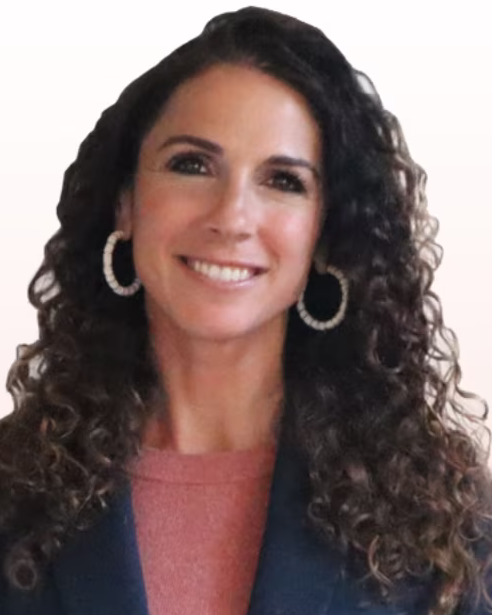

Nominee	Diana DiZoglio	Al Ozonoff
Party	Democratic	Libertarian
Popular vote	1,906,654	369,206
Percentage	83.8%	16.2%
State Auditor before election
Diana DiZoglio
Democratic
Elected State Auditor
Diana DiZoglio
Democratic

The 2026 Massachusetts State Auditor election was held on November 3, 2026, to elect the Massachusetts State Auditor. The election was held concurrently with elections to the United States Senate, U.S. House of Representatives, governor, and other state and local elections. Primary elections were held on September 1.

Incumbent Democrat Diana DiZoglio won re-election to a second term. She was elected in 2022 with 55.1% of the vote.

== Democratic primary ==
=== Background ===
DiZoglio was first elected auditor in 2022. During her term, she pushed for a ballot measure to allow the auditor to conduct an audit of the state legislature. The measure, Question 1, passed overwhelmingly with 71% of the vote in 2024. She had made auditing the state legislature a key component of her 2022 campaign. State lawmakers criticized the measure over concerns about separation of powers. After being passed, the new law quickly ran into legal trouble. The legislature maintained that the ballot measure was unconstitutional and hired lawyers to protect against a potential lawsuit from DiZoglio. Her clashes with other Democrats brought higher visibility to the position, which usually does not garner significant attention. The Boston Globe described her as the "most polarizing political figure in the Massachusetts Democratic Party."

During her term, DiZoglio had not been able to get Andrea Campbell, the Massachusetts Attorney General, to represent her in her effort to sue the legislature to force it to accept an audit. Campbell alleged that DiZoglio had not provided required information, while DiZoglio accused Campbell of "public corruption". DiZoglio went on to retain a Boston law firm as her office explored potential legal action. She retained the law firm with funding from Michael Minogue, a Republican candidate for governor.

In March 2026, a judge on the Massachusetts Supreme Judicial Court rejected a request by DiZoglio to hire outside counsel to represent her in her legal battle with the legislature, maintaining that only the state attorney general could represent her as she was a constitutional officer.

=== Candidates ===
==== Nominee ====
- Diana DiZoglio, incumbent State Auditor (2023–present)

=== Endorsements ===
Diana DiZoglio

Political parties

- Forward Party
- Massachusetts Democratic Party

=== Results ===
Democratic primary results
Party	Candidate	Votes	%
Democratic	Diana DiZoglio (incumbent)	724,087	99.5
Write-in		3,299	0.5
Total votes		727,386	100.0

== Third party candidates ==
=== Declared ===
- Al Ozonoff (Libertarian), researcher

== General election ==
=== Polling ===
Poll source	Date(s) administered	Sample size (Note: Key: A – all adults RV – registered voters LV – likely voters V – unclear)	Margin of error	Diana DiZoglio (D)	Al Ozonoff (L)	Other	Undecided
Suffolk University (Note: Poll sponsored by The Boston Globe.)	October 14–18, 2026	500 (LV)	± 4.4%	62%	15%	2% (Note: "Refused" with 2%)	21%
UMass Amherst/YouGov (Note: Poll sponsored by WCVB-TV.)	October 5–12, 2026	800 (RV)	± 4.2%	60%	11%	6% (Note: "Other" with 6%)	23%

=== Results ===
2026 Massachusetts State Auditor election
Party	Candidate	Votes	%	±%
Democratic	Diana DiZoglio (incumbent)			
Libertarian	Al Ozonoff			
Write-in				
Total votes			100.0	

== Notes ==
Partisan clients
