= 2026 Massachusetts Secretary of the Commonwealth election =

- November 3, 2026
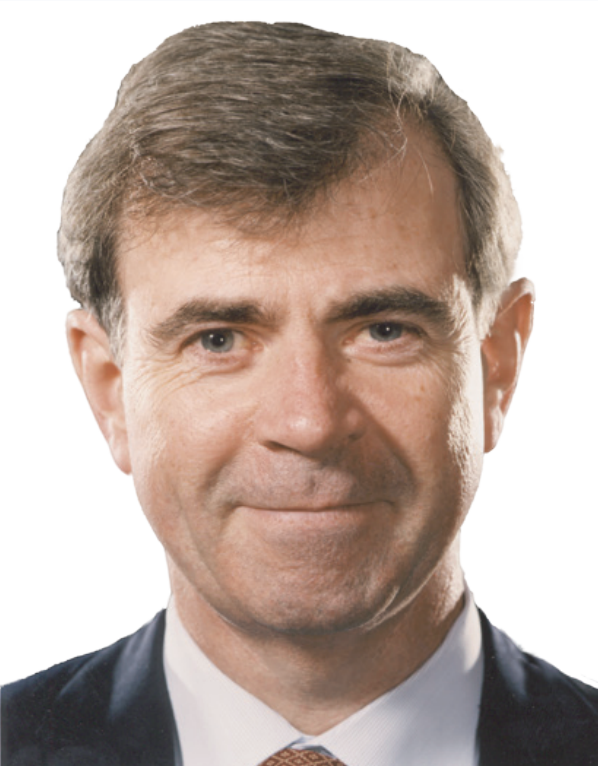

| Candidate | William F. Galvin | Anne Brensley |
| Party | Democratic | Republican |
| Popular vote | 1,835,055 | 740,281 |
| Percentage | 71.3% | 28.7% |
Secretary of the Commonwealth before election
William F. Galvin
Democratic
Elected Secretary of the Commonwealth
William F. Galvin
Democratic

The 2026 Massachusetts Secretary of the Commonwealth election was held on November 3, 2026, to elect the Secretary of the Commonwealth of Massachusetts. Primary elections were held on September 1. Incumbent Democratic secretary William F. Galvin is running for a 9th term.

== Democratic primary ==
=== Candidates ===
==== Nominee ====
- William F. Galvin, incumbent secretary of the commonwealth (1995–present)

=== Endorsements ===
William F. Galvin

Political parties

- Massachusetts Democratic Party

=== Results ===
Democratic primary results
| Party | Candidate | Votes | % |
|---|---|---|---|
| Democratic | William F. Galvin (incumbent) | 770,996 | 99.6 |
| Write-in | | 3,418 | 0.4 |
| Total votes | | 774,414 | 100.0 |

== Republican primary ==
Anne Brensley, a former candidate for lieutenant governor who withdrew after a signature gathering issue, ran for the nomination as a write-in candidate. She qualified for the general election after winning more than the required 5,000 votes.

=== Candidates ===
==== Nominee ====
- Anne Brensley, former Wayland select board member (2023–2026) (write-in candidate, previously ran for lieutenant governor)

=== Results ===
Republican primary results
| Party | Candidate | Votes | % |
|---|---|---|---|
| Republican | Anne Brensley (write-in) | 21,330 | 63.9 |
| Write-in | | 12,051 | 36.1 |
| Total votes | | 38,381 | 100.0 |

== General election ==
=== Predictions ===
| Source | Ranking | As of |
|---|---|---|
| Sabato's Crystal Ball | Safe D | November 2, 2025 |

=== Polling ===
| Poll source | Date(s) administered | Sample size (Note: Key: A – all adults RV – registered voters LV – likely voters V – unclear) | Margin of error | William F. Galvin (D) | Anne Brensley (R) | Other | Undecided |
|---|---|---|---|---|---|---|---|
| Suffolk University (Note: Poll sponsored by The Boston Globe.) | October 14–18, 2026 | 500 (LV) | ± 4.4% | 67% | 21% | 1% (Note: "Refused" with 1%) | 11% |
| UMass Amherst/YouGov (Note: Poll sponsored by WCVB-TV.) | October 5–12, 2026 | 800 (RV) | ± 4.2% | 59% | 26% | 3% (Note: "Other" with 3%) | 11% |

=== Results ===
2026 Massachusetts Secretary of the Commonwealth election
| Party | Candidate | Votes | % | ±% |
|---|---|---|---|---|
| Democratic | William F. Galvin (incumbent) | | | |
| Republican | Anne Brensley | | | |
| Write-in | | | | |
| Total votes | | | 100.0 | |

== Notes ==
Partisan clients
