= Robert Jubinville =

American attorney and politician

Robert L. Jubinville

Member of the Massachusetts Governor's Council from the 2nd district
- In office January 4, 2013 – 2023
- Preceded by: Kelly Timilty

Personal details
- Born: July 5, 1946 (age 80) Holyoke, Massachusetts, U.S.
- Party: Democratic
- Children: 2
- Education: Suffolk University (BA, JD)
- Profession: Lawyer

Military service
- Branch/service: United States Army

Robert L. Jubinville is an American attorney and politician, previously serving as a member of the Massachusetts Governor's Council. He is one of only three "Board Certified Criminal Trial Attorneys" in the Commonwealth of Massachusetts.

== Early life and education ==
Jubinville was born and raised in Holyoke, Massachusetts. By age fourteen, he became involved in The Boys and Girls Club of Greater Holyoke. His fascination with the American judicial system began as a child after watching the television series Perry Mason. Watching the show as a child provided an "escape from a difficult family life and an abusive, alcoholic father", according to Jubinville. Following his graduation from high school, he briefly attended Holyoke Community College before being drafted in 1968 into the United States Army, where he has said he "spent his entire hitch at the Natick Laboratories as a test subject for everything from equipment to new field drugs."

After his service in the Army, Jubinville worked as a Massachusetts State Police officer and was later promoted to detective. During this time, Jubinville studied at Suffolk University, where he earned an undergraduate degree and Juris Doctor.

== Career ==
Following his tenure as a detective, Jubinville practiced law for over forty-three years. He has stated that "his role is to make sure every client gets a fair trial, even if he doesn't like the person." He has been a legal contributor to New England Cable News and continues to work as a trial attorney with his daughter, Sarah. In 2022, Sarah Jubinville became a judge in a district court.

=== Governor's Council ===
In 2012, Jubinville won a seat on the Massachusetts Governor's Council. Citing a lack of sufficient legal experience, he voted against Governor Deval Patrick's Superior Court nominee, Brockton District Court Judge Angel Kelley Brown. Jubinville said he is concerned about lawyers on the Parole Board "using it as a stepping stone to judgeships".

Jubinville is also an advocate for reforming mandatory minimum drug sentences. When discussing non-violent drug offenders, he notes that it costs $45,000 a year in Massachusetts to house, feed and guard a single inmate per year. He argues that money is better spent on treatment programs.

On December 15, 2022, Governor Charlie Baker nominated Jubinville to serve as clerk magistrate of the Framingham District Court. On December 27, 2022, he was confirmed to serve as a clerk magistrate.

== Electoral history ==
2022 General election for Massachusetts Governor's Council District 2
Party	Candidate	Votes	%
Democratic	Robert L. Jubinville	194,480	63.2
Republican	Dashe M. Videira	112,941	36.7
Write-in		183	0.1
Total votes		307,604	100.0

2020 General election for Massachusetts Governor's Council District 2
Party	Candidate	Votes	%
Democratic	Robert L. Jubinville	341,890	98.6
Write-in		4,896	1.4
Total votes		346,786	100.0

2018 General election for Massachusetts Governor's Council District 2
Party	Candidate	Votes	%
Democratic	Robert L. Jubinville	261,499	98.6
Write-in		3,794	1.4
Total votes		265,293	100.0

2016 General election for Massachusetts Governor's Council District 2
Party	Candidate	Votes	%
Democratic	Robert L. Jubinville	239,729	61.5
Republican	Brad Williams	149,441	38.4
Write-in		491	.1
Total votes		389,661	100.0

2014 General election for Massachusetts Governor's Council District 2
Party	Candidate	Votes	%
Democratic	Robert L. Jubinville	188,046	98.6
Write-in		2,631	1.4
Total votes		190,677	100.0

2014 Democratic Primary for Massachusetts Governor's Council District 2
Party	Candidate	Votes	%
Democratic	Robert L. Jubinville	27,714	56.2
Democratic	Bart Andrew Timilty	21,498	43.6
Write-in		121	.2
Total votes		49,333	100.0

2012 General election for Massachusetts Governor's Council District 2
Party	Candidate	Votes	%
Democratic	Robert L. Jubinville	209,211	59.9
Republican	Earl H. Sholley	139,114	39.9
Write-in		732	.2
Total votes		349,057	100.0

2012 Democratic Primary for Massachusetts Governor's Council District 2
Party	Candidate	Votes	%
Democratic	Robert L. Jubinville	11,663	35.1
Democratic	Bart Andrew Timilty	9,333	28.1
Democratic	Brian M. Clinton	9,029	27.2
Democratic	Patrick J. McCabe	3,105	9.4
Write-in		71	.2
Total votes		33,201	100.0

2010 Democratic Primary for Massachusetts Governor's Council District 2
Party	Candidate	Votes	%
Democratic	Kelly A. Timilty	30,177	60.3
Democratic	Robert L. Jubinville	19,670	39.5
Write-in		122	.2
Total votes		50,059	100.0

2008 Democratic Primary for Massachusetts Governor's Council District 2
Party	Candidate	Votes	%
Democratic	Kelly A. Timilty	33,333	66.2
Democratic	Robert L. Jubinville	16,948	33.6
Write-in		105	.2
Total votes		50,386	100.0
