= Andrea C. James =

American human rights activist

Andrea James
- Born: Boston, Massachusetts, U.S.
- Education: University of Massachusetts, Boston (BA); Northeastern University (JD)
- Political party: Democratic (before 2026); Independent (2026–present)
- Criminal charges: Wire fraud
- Criminal penalty: 24 months imprisonment
- Criminal status: Released

Andrea C. James is an American human rights activist and political candidate. A former attorney, she was disbarred and sentenced to two years' imprisonment in 2009. Since her release, James has called for reform of the criminal justice system, including the end of the incarceration of women.

== Biography ==
James was born and raised in Boston, Massachusetts. She graduated with a bachelor's from University of Massachusetts, Boston and a Juris Doctor degree from Northeastern University. She then began work as a criminal defense and real estate conveyance attorney in Roxbury.

In 2008, James was temporarily suspended as a licensed attorney after being accused of misappropriating client funds. In 2009, she was sentenced to 24 months in federal prison on charges of wire fraud. In 2010, James was formally disbarred by the Supreme Court of Suffolk County.

James served her sentence at the Federal Correctional Institution, Danbury in Danbury, Connecticut. She subsequently stated that conditions in the prison were poor, and that prisoners were treated with "scorn and rebuke" by prison staff. Following her sentence, James was ordered to pay $1,141,861.22, in addition to serving three years of supervised release. James' attempt to appeal the fine and her disbarment on the basis of her previous work supporting disadvantaged communities was unsuccessful.

Following her release, James founded and served as the executive director of Families for Justice as Healing (FJAH), a non-governmental organisation that advocated for criminal justice reform through prioritising community wellness alternatives over incarceration. FJAH had started as a meeting between James and other women while they were imprisoned at FCI Danbury. FJAH also sought to draw attention to women becoming the fastest-growing incarcerated population. FJAH rejects criminalisation and incarceration in response to drug offences and advocates for a shift to "community wellness" to address poverty, addiction and trauma.

As part of her work with FJAH, James met with then-President of the United States, Barack Obama, and Valerie Jarrett, and supported 50 women whose sentences had been commuted by the Obama administration. James subsequently criticised Obama for being "inactive" on addressing the mass incarceration of women, and launched the "100 Women in 100 Days" campaign in response.

On 21 June 2014, FJAH led the FREE HER rally on the National Mall in Washington, D.C. to raise awareness of the impact of overly harsh drug crime sentencing on women and families.

James serves as the founder executive director of the National Council for Incarcerated and Formerly Incarcerated Women. The organisation believes the prison does not support women to heal and advance their lives and causes trauma to them and their children and focuses on transformative justice, alternative community economic development, participatory budgeting and developing liberation projects.

In 2021, James launched the #FreeHer campaign, pushing the administration of Joe Biden to grant clemency to 100 identified incarcerated women whom James felt had been imprisoned for too long.

In 2015, James was announced as a Soros Justice Fellow. In 2016, she won the Robert F. Kennedy Human Rights Award for her activism.

In May 2025, James filed paperwork to run in 2026 as governor of Massachusetts as a Democrat, stating to the Boston Globe she was "exploring" a run. She qualified for the general election ballot as an Independent.

James is the author of the 2013 Upper Bunkies Unite: And Other Thoughts on the Politics of Mass Incarceration.
