= Peter Durant =

American politician

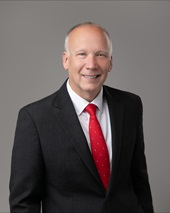

Member of the Massachusetts Senate from the Worcester and Hampshire district
- Incumbent
- Assumed office November 29, 2023
- Preceded by: Anne Gobi

Member of the Massachusetts House of Representatives from the 6th Worcester district
- In office May 25, 2011 – November 29, 2023
- Preceded by: Geraldo Alicea
- Succeeded by: John Marsi

Personal details
- Born: 1964 or 1965 (age 60–61) Spencer, Massachusetts, U.S.
- Party: Republican
- Spouse: Kate Campanale
- Education: Florida Institute of Technology (AS); Northeastern University (BA)
- Website: Campaign website

Peter J. Durant (born 1964/1965) is an American state legislator and member of the Massachusetts State Senate from the Worcester and Hampshire Senate district.

Prior to his election to the State Senate, Durant served as a state representative from the 6th Worcester district in the Massachusetts House of Representatives. He is also a former member of the Spencer Board of Selectmen.

== Elections ==
=== 2010 regular and 2011 special ===
The 2010 election for the 6th Worcester seat resulted in an exact tie between Durant and Democratic incumbent Geraldo Alicea. A special election for the seat was scheduled for May 10, 2011. Alicea was allowed to hold the seat until the results of the new election.

Durant won the special election by 56 votes (3,325 votes to Alicea's 3,269).

=== 2023 State Senate special ===
In May 2023, Massachusetts Governor Maura Healey announced that State Senator Anne Gobi of the Worcester and Hampshire District would become her new director of rural affairs. Due to Senator Gobi's resignation, a special election was announced for November 7, 2023.

Then-Representative Durant announced his candidacy for the Republican nomination in June 2023. He won the Republican primary on October 10, 2023, beating Bruce Chester with nearly 61% of the vote.

In the general election, Durant faced his colleague, State Representative Jonathan Zlotnik of Gardner. Durant won the general election by over 2,000 votes, earning nearly 55% of the vote. He was sworn into office by Governor Maura Healey on November 29, 2023.

== Committee Assignments ==
For the 2025-26 Session, Durant serves on the following committees in the Senate:

- Juvenile and Emerging Adult Justice - Ranking Minority
- Personnel and Administration - Ranking Minority
- Advanced Information Technology, the Internet and Cybersecurity - Ranking Minority
- Aging and Independence - Ranking Minority
- Cannabis Policy - Ranking Minority
- Economic Development and Emerging Technologies - Ranking Minority
- Municipalities and Regional Government - Ranking Minority
- Public Safety and Homeland Security - Ranking Minority
- State Administration and Regulatory Oversight - Ranking Minority
- Post Audit and Oversight

== See also ==
- 2019–2020 Massachusetts legislature
- 2021–2022 Massachusetts legislature
