= Worcester and Hampshire district =

American legislative district

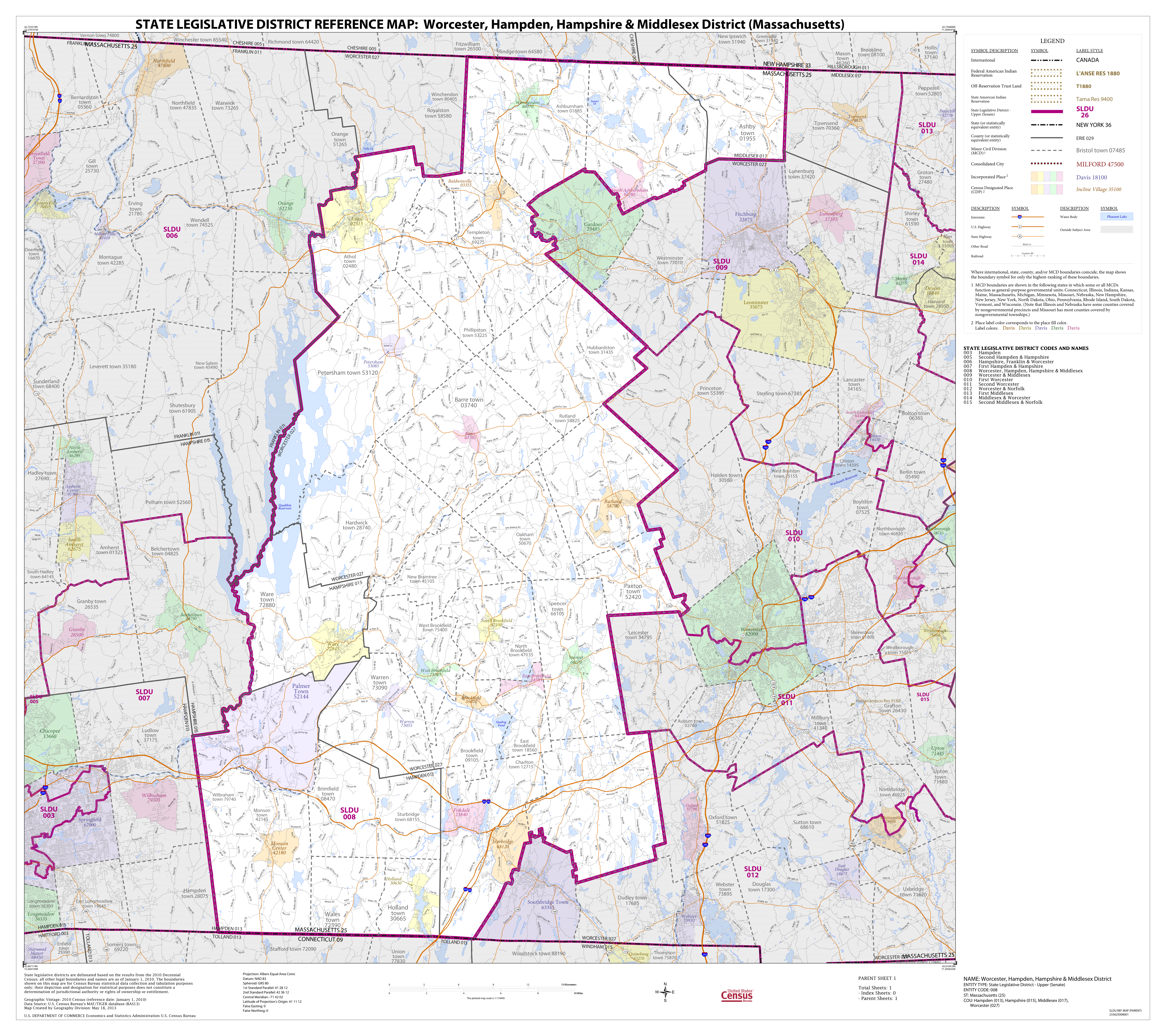
Map of Massachusetts Senate's Worcester, Hampden, Hampshire and Middlesex district, based on the 2010 United States census.

The Massachusetts Senate's Worcester and Hampshire district is one of 40 legislative districts of the Massachusetts Senate.

It covers portions of Hampshire and Worcester counties.

Created in 2021 via redistricting, the district encompasses much of the old Worcester, Hampden, Hampshire and Middlesex Senate district. Senator Anne Gobi briefly represented the new district before her resignation in June 2023. Following a special election in November 2023, the district is represented by Senator Peter Durant of Spencer.

== Towns represented ==
The district includes the following localities:

- Barre
- Brookfield
- East Brookfield
- Gardner
- Hardwick
- Holden
- Hubbardston
- Leicester
- North Brookfield
- New Braintree
- Oakham
- Paxton
- Phillipston
- Princeton
- Rutland
- Spencer
- Sterling
- Templeton
- Ware
- West Brookfield
- Westminster
- Worcester Ward 7, Precincts 2, 4–6; Ward 9, Precincts 3-4

== Senators ==
- Anne Gobi January - June 2023
- Peter Durant November 2023 – present

== See also ==
- List of Massachusetts Senate elections
- List of Massachusetts General Courts
- List of former districts of the Massachusetts Senate
