= Paul DePalo =

American politician (born 1978/1979)

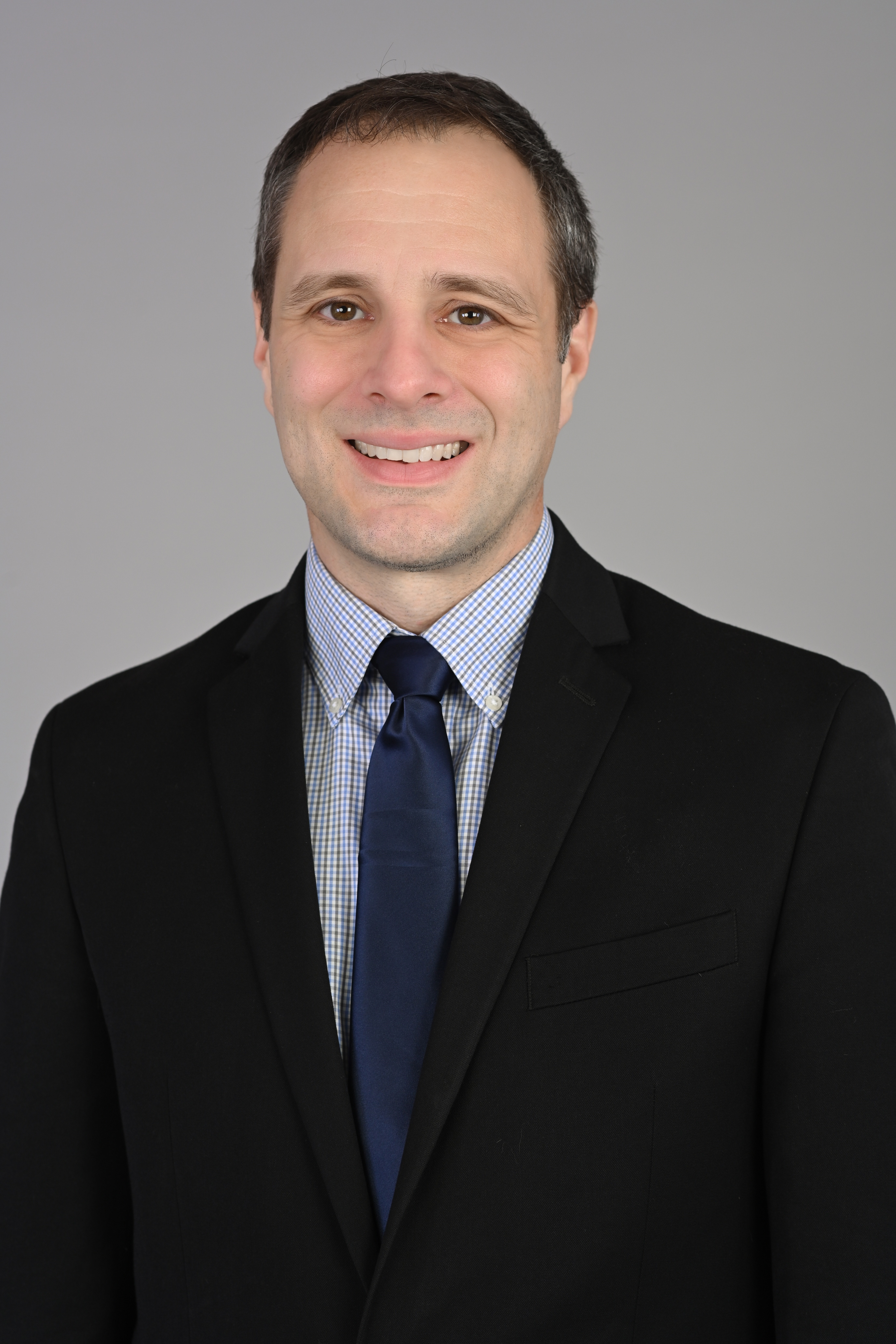
- DePalo in 2023

Member of the Massachusetts Governor's Council from the 7th district
- Incumbent
- Assumed office January 7, 2021
- Preceded by: Jennie Caissie

Personal details
- Born: 1978 or 1979 (age 46–47) Worcester, Massachusetts, U.S.
- Party: Democratic
- Education: Wesleyan University (BA); Northeastern University (JD); Fitchburg State University (MEd)

Paul M. DePalo (born 1978/1979) is an American politician. He is member of the Massachusetts Governor's Council, representing District 7 since winning election in November 2020 and taking office January 2021. A member of the Democratic Party, DePalo has also served on the Massachusetts Democratic State Committee since 2021. DePalo is an attorney at an employee-side employment and labor law firm.

== Early life and education ==
DePalo grew up in Shrewsbury, Massachusetts. His mother was a public school teacher in Shrewsbury and his father, Maurice "Moe" DePalo, was a 10-term Selectman in Shrewsbury.

After graduating from Shrewsbury High School in Shrewsbury, Massachusetts, DePalo attended Wesleyan University in Middletown, Connecticut, graduating with a BA in English in 2001. DePalo earned his Juris Doctor at Northeastern University School of Law in 2005, and Masters of Education from Fitchburg State University in 2016.

== Teaching career ==
After working as a litigation associate at Boston firm Campbell Campbell Edwards Conroy, DePalo left the practice of law for eight years to teach high school.

First, he taught English and American Studies at his alma mater Shrewsbury High School in Shrewsbury, MA. He also taught in public schools in Uxbridge, MA and Maynard, MA as well as spending a year as a principal resident in Boston Public Schools. His final teaching position was as a Humanities and Special Education teacher at a therapeutic public high school for students dealing with social and emotional disabilities. DePalo remains licensed in the Commonwealth of Massachusetts as a Superintendent, Principal, English teacher, and Teacher of Students with Moderate Disabilities.

== Elections ==
DePalo's first elected office was as Town Meeting Member in Shrewsbury, where he was eventually elected from 3 different precincts in 2007, 2008, and 2009.

=== 2018 General Election Massachusetts Governor's Council District 7 ===
In 2017, DePalo announced that he would challenge 4-term incumbent Governor's Councillor Jennie Caissie, a Tea-Party Republican in the 2018 election. DePalo ran on a platform of juvenile justice (stressing the need for a trauma-informed system), addressing racial disparities in charging and sentencing, diversifying the judiciary, and restoring civility on the Council. Ultimately DePalo lost, earning 47.5% of the vote.

=== 2020 Democratic Primary Election Massachusetts Governor's Council District 7 ===
In 2020, DePalo again ran for the Democratic nomination for the District 7 Council seat. This time, he attracted a challenger, Padraic Rafferty, a lawyer from Worcester. DePalo eventually won, winning 64 of 65 towns in District 7. The election was notable in that a Super PAC connected with then-Governor Charlie Baker spent more money against DePalo than in any other primary election that year.

=== 2022 General Election Massachusetts Governor's Council District 7 ===
DePalo won re-election to his second term on the Council by defeating a Republican challenger in the November 2022 general election.

=== 2024 General Election Massachusetts Governor's Council District 7 ===
DePalo won re-election in 2024 against Republican Andrew Couture 57.3% to 42.5%.

=== 2026 General Election Massachusetts Governor's Council District 7 ===
In 2026 DePalo is running for re-election with no competition in the Democratic primary and against a Republican challenger in general.
