= Marilyn Petitto Devaney =

American politician

Member of the Massachusetts Governor's Council from the 3rd district
- In office January 7, 1999 – January 2, 2025
- Preceded by: Cynthia Stone Creem
- Succeeded by: Mara Dolan

Personal details
- Born: February 26, 1939 (age 87)
- Party: Democratic
- Education: Middlesex Community College; Suffolk University (BA); Boston State College (MA)

Marilyn Petitto Devaney is an American politician, who formerly served as a member of the Massachusetts Governor's Council. She was the oldest member of the council during her incumbency. Devaney is a former member of the Watertown, Massachusetts City Council.

== Political positions ==
=== Recordings of Governor's Council Meetings ===
During the Covid-19 Pandemic, the council's meetings were held virtually and live-streamed free to the general public. In March, 2022 the Governor's Council ended the live-streaming of their once a week meetings. Devaney was the sole councilor to call upon the council to reinstate virtual public access to the meeting. Following support from councilors Eileen Duff and Mary Hurley, the live stream was restored starting on April 20, 2022.

== Conduct ==
=== Curling iron incident ===
In 2007, Devaney attempted to purchase several products at a salon in Watertown. When the clerk told Devaney that she would need to present a valid drivers license to pay with a check, Devaney attempted to use her position on the Council to get around presenting an ID. When the clerk informed Devaney it was impossible to complete the transaction in the computer system without entering in details from a license, Devaney was accused of throwing a curling iron at her.

Devaney later attempted to subpoena a reporter from the Watertown Tab & Press, seeking to determine how she obtained a copy of the police report from the incident.

=== Mailbox incident ===
On August 24, 2020 Devaney was alleged to have gone through mail in her neighbor's mailbox during the night of August 22, 2020 at 10:50pm. On a call with the Watertown Police Department, Councilor Devaney claimed she did not fiddle with their mail, only pushing a piece of mail back into the box that was sticking out. The council member later told the State House News Service that she required cement work done on a sidewalk and was searching for the home of a previously hired contractor. Devaney later reversed her statement, denying that she had ever gone into the mailbox, despite video surveillance footage circulating online. The Watertown police had the case forwarded to the United States Postal Inspection Service.

=== Erroneous claims of endorsement ===
In 2022, Devaney claimed she had been endorsed by Congressman Jim McGovern and State Auditor candidate Chris Dempsey. Both denied endorsing her.

=== Conflict with other councilors ===
During the September 13, 2023 meeting, Councilor Devaney interrupted Lt. Governor Kim Driscoll, who chairs the Governor's Council, with a prepared speech. Devaney alleged five of her six colleagues arranged a boycott of a September 6th public comment session she had held regarding the Kenny Jean pardon. Following a back and forth between Devaney and Councilor Kennedy, Councilor Paul DePalo motioned to establish a new rules committee for the Governor's Council.

== Electoral history ==
=== Results ===
Devaney lost the 2024 Democratic primary to Mara Dolan.

2024 Governor's Council Democratic Primary 3rd District
Party	Candidate	Votes	%
Democratic	Mara Dolan	45,238	52.2
Democratic	Marilyn Pettito Devaney	41,478	47.8
Total votes		86,716	100.0

Devaney ran unopposed in the 2022 General Election.

2022 Governor's Council Democratic Primary 3rd District
Party	Candidate	Votes	%
Democratic	Marilyn Pettito Devaney	50,960	50.8
Democratic	Mara Dolan	49,302	49.1
Write-in		107	0.1
Total votes		100,369	100.0

Devaney had no challengers in the 2018 General Election or 2020 Democratic Primary and general election.

2018 Governor's Council Democratic Primary 3rd District
Party	Candidate	Votes	%
Democratic	Marilyn Pettito Devaney	51,781	56.1
Democratic	Nick Carter	40,372	43.7
Write-in		174	0.2
Total votes		92,327	100.0

Devaney faced no opposition in the 2016 General Election.

2016 Governor's Council Democratic Primary 3rd District
Party	Candidate	Votes	%
Democratic	Marilyn Pettito Devaney	13,058	48.5
Democratic	William Bishop Humphrey	7,905	29.4
Democratic	Peter Georgiou	5,881	21.4
Write-in		80	0.3
Total votes		26,924	100.0

2014 Governor's Council General Election 3rd District
Party	Candidate	Votes	%
Democratic	Marilyn Pettito Devaney	160,994	65.2
Independent	Thomas Sheff	85,401	34.6
Write-in		553	0.2
Total votes		246,948	100.0

2014 Governor's Council Democratic Primary 3rd District
Party	Candidate	Votes	%
Democratic	Marilyn Pettito Devaney	33,905	54.3
Democratic	Charles N. Shapiro	28,383	45.5
Write-in		135	0.2
Total votes		62,423	100.0

2012 Governor's Council General Election 3rd District
Party	Candidate	Votes	%
Democratic	Marilyn Pettito Devaney	250,772	73.5
Independent	Thomas Sheff	89,203	26.2
Write-in		1,074	0.3
Total votes		341,049	100.0

2012 Governor's Council Democratic Primary 3rd District
Party	Candidate	Votes	%
Democratic	Marilyn Pettito Devaney	17,730	41.6
Democratic	Harry S. Margolis	10,122	34.4
Democratic	Charles N. Shapiro	10,122	23.7
Write-in		122	0.3
Total votes		42,632	100.0

2010 Governor's Council General Election 3rd District
Party	Candidate	Votes	%
Democratic	Marilyn Pettito Devaney	150,683	60.0
Independent	Nicholas A. Iannuzzi	99,957	39.8
Write-in		417	0.2
Total votes		251,057	100.0

2010 Governor's Council Democratic Primary 3rd District
Party	Candidate	Votes	%
Democratic	Marilyn Pettito Devaney	21,127	56.6
Democratic	Corey A. Belanger	16,114	41.3
Write-in		117	0.3
Total votes		37,358	100.0

Devaney faced no opponents on the ballot in the 2008 Governor's Council District 3 General Election.

2008 Governor's Council Democratic Primary 3rd District
Party	Candidate	Votes	%
Democratic	Marilyn Pettito Devaney	23,515	53.2
Democratic	John J. Doyle	14,722	33.3
Democratic	Thomas L. Walsh	5,831	13.2
Write-in		166	0.4
Total votes		44,234	100.0

Devaney had no opponents in the 2002, 2004, and 2006 Democratic primaries and General Elections.

2000 Governor's Council General Election 3rd District
Party	Candidate	Votes	%
Democratic	Marilyn Pettito Devaney	213,656	82.4
Republican	Barry T. Hutch	45,248	17.4
Write-in		498	0.2
Total votes		259,402	100.0

1998 Governor's Council General Election 3rd District
Party	Candidate	Votes	%
Democratic	Marilyn Pettito Devaney	132,876	62.1
Republican	John Henry DeJong	80,899	37.8
Write-in		170	0.1
Total votes		213,945	100.0

1998 Governor's Council Democratic Primary 3rd District
Party	Candidate	Votes	%
Democratic	Marilyn Pettito Devaney	12,541	18.1
Democratic	Ruth E. Nemzoff	12,181	17.6
Democratic	Francis Thomas 'Frank' Talty	11,010	15.9
Democratic	Howard I. Goldstein	8,725	12.6
Democratic	John W. Costello	7,776	11.2
Democratic	Ginny Allan	7,595	11.0
Democratic	Garret J. Barry	6,036	8.7
Democratic	Leonard H. Golder	3,373	4.9
Write-in		75	0.1
Total votes		69,312	100.0
