= Christopher Iannella Jr. =

American lawyer

Chris Iannella
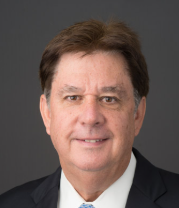
- Official portrait

Member of the Massachusetts Governor's Council from the 4th district
- Incumbent
- Assumed office January 7, 1993
- Preceded by: Peter Eleey

Member of the Massachusetts Governor's Council from the 2nd district
- In office January 2, 1985 – January 2, 1991
- Preceded by: Robert Casey
- Succeeded by: Michael Murphy

Personal details
- Born: November 6, 1952 (age 74) Boston, Massachusetts, U.S.
- Party: Democratic
- Relatives: Christopher A. Iannella (father)
- Education: Boston College (BA); Suffolk University (JD)

Christopher A. Iannella Jr. (born November 6, 1952) is an American attorney and politician, a member of the Massachusetts Governor's Council.

== Early life and education ==
Iannella was born in Boston, Massachusetts. He graduated from Boston College and Suffolk University Law School.

== Career ==
Iannella practiced law in Boston. He was a member of the Massachusetts Governor's Council from 1985 to 1990 and again starting in 1993. Iannella is a Democrat.

== Personal life ==
Iannella's father, Christopher A. Iannella, was on the Massachusetts General Court and the Boston City Council.
