= Massachusetts Governor's Council =

Governmental body in Massachusetts, US

Massachusetts Governor's Council Executive Council
- Great Seal of Massachusetts
- Government of Massachusetts
- Type: Non-executive advisory body Advice and Consent
- Reports to: Governor of Massachusetts
- Residence: None official
- Seat: State House, Boston, Massachusetts
- Nominator: Nominating petition
- Appointer: Popular vote
- Term length: Two years, no term limits
- Constituting instrument: Constitution of Massachusetts
- Formation: Original Charter; March 18, 1629; Modern Form; October 25, 1780
- Website: https://www.mass.gov/orgs/governors-council

The Massachusetts Governor's Council (also known as the Executive Council) is a governmental body that provides advice and consent in certain matters – such as judicial nominations, pardons, and commutations – to the Governor of Massachusetts. Councillors are elected by the general public and their duties are set forth in the Massachusetts Constitution.

The Governor's Council has gone through many different formations throughout its history, at times being simply a legal counsel, also serving as provincial magistrates and judges, sometimes acting as an executive in the absence of a Governor, to serving as an upper house of the Massachusetts General Court (the state legislature). Whether going by the name of "Council of Assistants" or Governor's Council, the power of the council has ebbed and flowed; however, it has remained a mainstay in New England politics from the earliest colonial days of Massachusetts Bay.

== Qualifications ==
Any person seeking to become a member of the Massachusetts Governor's Council must meet the following requirements:

- Be at least eighteen years of age
- Be a registered voter in Massachusetts
- Be a Massachusetts resident for at least five years when elected
- Receive 1,000 signatures from registered voters on nomination papers

== History ==
The Massachusetts Bay Colony received its first royal charter in 1629, with the founding of Boston, following the arrival in 1630 of Governor John Winthrop and a fleet of principally Puritan settlers. The colony's governance was based on this charter, which included the establishment of a "council of assistants." The assistants were a body of magistrates who not only decided judicial cases, but also played a role in the colony's lawmaking. The assistants were elected by the colony's freemen.

After the colony's original charter was revoked in 1684, there was the short-lived Dominion of New England (1686-1689), which was succeeded in the territories of modern Massachusetts and Maine by the Province of Massachusetts Bay. The charter for the province called for "eight and twenty assistants, or counsellors, to be advising and assisting to the governor" who were to be chosen annually by the Great and General Court. It further specified that the council was to assume the duties of the governor in the absence of both the royal governor and lieutenant governor (who were appointed by the crown), and enumerated some of the specific issues on which the council was to advise the governor. During the provincial period, the relationship between the governor and council was sometimes difficult, since the council represented colonial interests which diverged from the crown interests of the governor. The Council also had authority over approving and accepting officer's commissions in the militia.

Unlike with the previous charter for the Colony of Massachusetts Bay, the 1691 Massachusetts Charter stripped the power of judicial ruling from the Council. The council would continue to "advise and consent"; however, they would no longer hear appeals. The appeals were to be administered by the local courts and any suit which was of significant sum, namely 300 Pounds sterling, would be moved to the King's Privy Council. Other appointments were taken from the Council as well and given to the authority of the General Court.

During the American Revolution, the state government operated under the Massachusetts Charter of 1691 but did so without a governor. The council acted as the executive. The modern Constitution of Massachusetts was adopted in 1780.

== Composition ==
The Council is composed of eight councillors and the governor or lieutenant governor, who presides over the Council. The Massachusetts Constitution specifies that "the governor, and in his absence the lieutenant governor, shall be president of the council, but shall have no vote in council: and the lieutenant governor shall always be a member of the council except when the chair of the governor shall be vacant."

The eight councillors are elected every two years, one for each of eight councillor districts; residency in the district is not a requirement. The council membership was originally nominated by the house of representatives and elected by the state senate. The state constitution upon the prompting of the American Party (Know Nothings) in 1854 was changed to make the council an elected position open to all state residents. The Governor's Council districts changed over time and are now specially composed. Each district consists of the entirety of five contiguous Massachusetts Senate districts.

There are provisions in the Massachusetts Constitution for filling unexpected vacancies. If a seat on the Council becomes vacant, the General Court may, by concurrent vote, select some person from the relevant councillor district to fill the opening. If the General Court is not in session, the Governor may select the new councillor, with the advice and consent of the existing Council.

Current members are listed below.

District	Name	Party	Residence	Start
1st	Joseph Ferreira	Democratic	Swansea	January 8, 2015
2nd	Tamisha Civil	Democratic	Stoughton	January 2, 2025
3rd	Mara Dolan	Democratic	Concord	January 2, 2025
4th	Chris Iannella	Democratic	Boston	January 7, 1993
5th	Eunice Zeigler	Democratic	Methuen	January 2, 2025
6th	Terrence Kennedy	Democratic	Lynnfield	January 6, 2011
7th	Paul DePalo	Democratic	Worcester	January 7, 2021
8th	Tara Jacobs	Democratic	North Adams	January 5, 2023

== Duties and salary ==
The Council generally meets at noon on Wednesdays in its State House Chamber, next to the Governor's Office. Pursuant to the Massachusetts Constitution, the Governor may, in general and at his or her discretion, from time to time assemble the Council for the ordering and directing the affairs of the commonwealth. In addition, the Governor must seek the advice and consent of the Council with respect to nominations of judicial officers, appointment and removal of notaries public and justices of the peace, issuance of pardons and commutations, and payment of monies from the treasury.

Annual compensation in 2016 was $36,025.

== Controversies ==
The outside conduct of some councillors has drawn public scrutiny in recent years. Felony assault charges were dismissed in July 2008 against one councillor, Marilyn Petitto Devaney. In the 2008 election, councillor Kelly A. Timilty falsified the endorsement of the governor and later was fined. The 2008 election generated higher than usual interest in Council seats, but all of the incumbents were reelected.

== Role in gubernatorial succession ==
Originally, the Massachusetts Constitution placed the Governor's Council in the line of executive succession. If the offices of Governor and Lieutenant Governor were both vacant, the Council would act as chief executive. During the colonial period this occurred three times. Following statehood, it occurred only once. After the death of Governor Increase Sumner in 1799, Lieutenant Governor Moses Gill became Acting Governor, and following his death in 1800 the council chaired by Thomas Dawes succeeded to the governorship.

The constitutional line of succession was amended in 1918 to remove the Council and insert the "secretary, attorney-general, treasurer and receiver-general, and auditor," in that order.

== Elections ==
- 2006 Massachusetts Governor's Council election
- 2022 Massachusetts Governor's Council election
- 2024 Massachusetts Governor's Council election

== See also ==
- New Hampshire Executive Council
- Council of State

Political offices
Preceded by William Stoughton (Acting Governor, died)	Acting Governor of the Province of Massachusetts Bay; July 10, 1701 – June 11, 1702	Succeeded by Joseph Dudley
Preceded by Joseph Dudley (Commission expired)	Acting Governor of the Province of Massachusetts Bay; February 4, 1715 – March 21, 1715	Succeeded by Joseph Dudley
Preceded by Spencer Phips (Acting Governor, died)	Acting Governor of the Province of Massachusetts Bay; April 5, 1757 – August 3, 1757	Succeeded by Thomas Pownall
Preceded by Moses Gill (Acting Governor, died)	Acting Governor of Massachusetts; May 20, 1800 – May 30, 1800	Succeeded by Caleb Strong (elected governor)
