= 2006 Massachusetts House of Representatives election =

- November 7, 2006

All 160 seats in the Massachusetts House of Representatives 81 seats needed for a majority
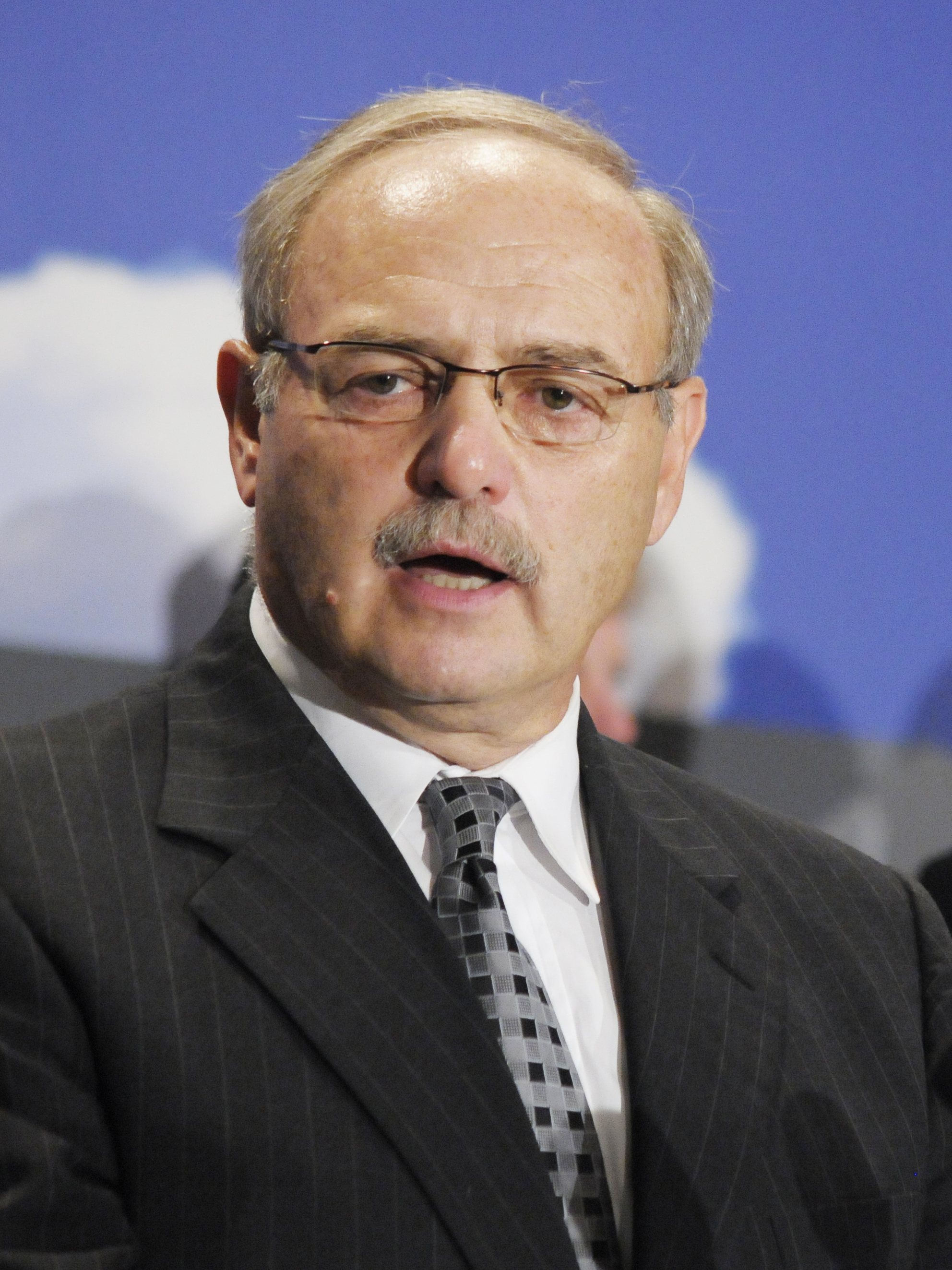

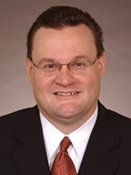
	Majority party	Minority party
Leader	Salvatore DiMasi	Bradley Jones Jr.
Party	Democratic	Republican
Leader since	September 28, 2004	November 21, 2002
Leader's seat	3rd Suffolk	20th Middlesex
Last election	138 seats	21 seats
Seats won	141	19
Seat change	▲3	▼2
- Results: Democratic hold Democratic gain Republican hold
Speaker before election
Salvatore DiMasi
Democratic
Elected Speaker
Salvatore DiMasi
Democratic

Elections for the Massachusetts House of Representatives were held on November 7, 2006, with all of the 160 seats in the House up for election. The term of Representatives elected is two years, January 2007 until January 2009. The 2006 Massachusetts Senate election occurred on the same day as the House election, along with Federal and Gubernatorial elections.

The House session ending in January 2007 consists of 139 (87%) Democrats, and 21 (13%) Republicans. The Democrats hold more than a two-thirds majority of the seats in the House. For the Republicans to break that two-thirds majority, they were required to gain 33 Democratic-held seats, a feat that was impossible to accomplish in 2006 as only 32 Democrats faced Republican challengers. Similarly, Republicans could not hope to gain the 59 seats needed to take control of the chamber, as there were not enough challengers to make that possible. Conversely, the Democrats challenged only 8 of the 21 Republican-held seats.

128 of the 160 seats were left uncontested by one of the major parties in the 2006 election.

== Predictions ==
Source	Ranking	As of
Rothenberg	Safe D	November 4, 2006

== Election results ==
Two seats changed parties, both Republican seats that switched to Democrats. In the 4th Barnstable District, Sarah Peake (D-Provincetown) defeated Aaron Maloy (R-Orleans) to take the seat of retiring Shirley Gomes (R). In the 13th Middlesex, incumbent Susan W. Pope (R-Wayland) was defeated by Thomas Conroy (D-Wayland). No other incumbents were defeated, and all other open seats were retained by the party holding them.

== Barnstable County ==
District	Incumbent	Hometown	Incumbent Status	Competing candidates	2006 Result	Vote % of winner in 2004
1	Cleon Turner (D)	Dennis	Running	Cleon Turner (D-Dennis); Dick Neitz (R-Yarmouth)	52.0% 48.0%	51%
2	Demetrius Atsalis (D)	Barnstable	Running	Demetrius Atsalis (D-Barnstable); William Crocker (R-Barnstable)	56.0% 44.0%	59%
3	Matthew Patrick (D)	Falmouth	Running	Matthew Patrick (D-Falmouth); Unopposed	98.5%	53%
4	Shirley Gomes (R)	Harwich	Retiring	Sarah Peake (D-Provincetown); Aaron Maloy (R-Orleans)	55.7% 44.2%	57%
5	Jeffrey Davis Perry (R)	Sandwich	Running	Jeffrey Davis Perry (R-Sandwich); Unopposed	98.9%	66%

=== Primary results ===
District	Candidates	Votes	%
4 (D)	Sarah Peake	4,381	55%
4 (D)	Raymond Gottwald	1,875	24%
4 (D)	Ronald Bergstrom	1,652	21%
4 (R)	Aaron Maloy	(873)	(34%)
4 (R)	Donald Howell	(862)	(34%)
4 (R)	Andrew Buckley	(831)	(32%)

== Barnstable, Dukes and Nantucket Counties ==
District	Incumbent	Hometown	Incumbent Status	Competing candidates	2006 Result	Vote % of winner in 2004
1	Eric Turkington (D)	Falmouth	Running	Eric Turkington (D-Falmouth); Jim Powell (R-Martha's Vineyard)	70.3% 29.6%	70%

== Berkshire County ==
District	Incumbent	Hometown	Incumbent Status	Competing candidates	2006 Result	Vote % of winner in 2004
1	Daniel E. Bosley (D)	North Adams	Running	Daniel E. Bosley (D-North Adams); Unopposed	99.6%	82%
2	Denis Guyer (D)	Dalton	Running	Denis Guyer (D-Dalton); Stefan Racz (I-Shelburne Falls)	77.2% 22.7%	70%
3	Christopher Speranzo (D)	Pittsfield	Running	Christopher Speranzo (D-Pittsfield); Unopposed	99.6%	100%
4	William "Smitty" Pignatelli (D)	Lenox	Running	William "Smitty" Pignatelli (D-Lenox); Unopposed	99.6%	73%

== Bristol County ==
District	Incumbent	Hometown	Incumbent Status	Competing candidates	2006 Result	Vote % of winner in 2004
1	Ginny Coppola (R)	Foxborough	Retiring	F. Jay Barrows (R-Mansfield); Claire Naughton (D-Foxborough)	51.0% 48.7%	100%
2	John Lepper (R)	Attleboro	Running	John Lepper (R-Attleboro); Kate Jackson (D-Attleboro)	54.4% 45.6%	100%
3	James Fagan (D)	Taunton	Running	James Fagan (D-Taunton); Unopposed	99.2%	100%
4	Philip Travis (D)	Rehoboth	Retiring	Steven D'Amico (D-Seekonk); Steven Howitt (R-Seekonk)	56.9% 43.0%	63%
5	Patricia Haddad (D)	Somerset	Running	Patricia Haddad (D-Somerset); Unopposed	99.5%	80%
6	David B. Sullivan (D)	Fall River	Running	David B. Sullivan (D-Fall River); Unopposed	99.7%	100%
7	Robert Correia (D)	Fall River	Running	Robert Correia (D-Fall River); Raymond Leary (L-Fall River)	86.5% 13.4%	85%
8	Michael Rodrigues (D)	Westport	Running	Michael Rodrigues (D-Westport); Unopposed	99.9%	100%
9	John F. Quinn (D)	Dartmouth	Running	John F. Quinn (D-Dartmouth); Unopposed	99.0%	100%
10	William M. Straus (D)	Mattapoisett	Running	William M. Straus (D-Mattapoisett); Peter Winters (R-Marion)	70.8% 29.2%	65%
11	Robert Koczera (D)	New Bedford	Running	Robert Koczera (D-New Bedford); Dennis Dellaire (I-New Bedford)	64.4% 35.5%	100%
12	Stephen Canessa (D)	New Bedford	Running	Stephen Canessa (D-New Bedford); Mark A. Howland (I-New Bedford)	69.2% 30.5%	100%
13	Antonio Cabral (D)	New Bedford	Running	Antonio Cabral (D-New Bedford); Carlos Felix (I-New Bedford); Robert Gardner (I-New Bedford)	78.9% 6.5% 14.5%	100%
14	Elizabeth Poirier (R)	North Attleborough	Running	Elizabeth Poirier (R-North Attleborough); Unopposed	98.8%	65%

== Essex County ==
District	Incumbent	Hometown	Incumbent Status	Competing candidates	2006 Result	Vote % of winner in 2004
1	Michael A. Costello (D)	Newburyport	Running	Michael A. Costello (D-Newburyport); Unopposed	100%	66%
2	Harriett Stanley (D)	West Newbury	Running	Harriett Stanley (D-West Newbury); Evan O'Reilly (R-Georgetown)	62% 38%	63%
3	Brian Dempsey (D)	Haverhill	Running	Brian Dempsey (D-Haverhill); Unopposed	100%	68%
4	Bradford Hill (R)	Ipswich	Running	Bradford Hill (R-Ipswich); Unopposed	100%	62%
5	Anthony Verga (D)	Gloucester	Running	Anthony Verga (D-Gloucester); Unopposed	100%	100%
6	Mary Grant (D)	Beverly	Running	Mary Grant (D-Beverly); Donato Paglia (I-Beverly)	81% 19%	67%
7	John D. Keenan (D)	Salem	Running	John D. Keenan (D-Salem); Unopposed	100%	74%
8	Douglas W. Petersen (D)	Marblehead	Running	Douglas W. Petersen (D-Marblehead); Unopposed	100%	65%
9	Mark Falzone (D)	Saugus	Running	Mark Falzone (D-Saugus); Unopposed	100%	66%
10	Robert Fennell (D)	Lynn	Running	Robert Fennell (D-Lynn); Unopposed	100%	100%
11	Steven Walsh (D)	Lynn	Running	Steven Walsh (D-Lynn); Unopposed	100%	100%
12	Joyce Spiliotis (D)	Peabody	Running	Joyce Spiliotis (D-Peabody); Jason Harding (R-Peabody)	69% 31%	66%
13	Theodore C. Speliotis (D)	Peabody	Running	Theodore C. Speliotis (D-Danvers); Unopposed	100%	58%
14	David Torrisi (D)	North Andover	Running	David Torrisi (D-North Andover); Unopposed	100%	66%
15	Arthur Broadhurst (D)	Methuen	Defeated in Run for Northern Essex; Register of Deeds	Linda Dean Campbell (D-Methuen); Robert Andrew (R-Methuen); Kenneth Hendrick (I-Methuen)	61% 28% 11%	100%
16	William Lantigua (D)	Lawrence	Running	William Lantigua (D-Lawrence); Unopposed	100%	57%
17	Barry R. Finegold (D)	Andover	Running	Barry R. Finegold (D-Andover); Unopposed	100%	62%
18	Barbara A. L'Italien (D)	Andover	Running	Barbara A. L'Italien (D-Andover); Lawrence Brennan (R-Georgetown)	59% 41%	58%

== Franklin County ==
District	Incumbent	Hometown	Incumbent Status	Competing candidates	2006 Result	Vote % of winner in 2004
1	Stephen Kulik (D)	Worthington	Running	Stephen Kulik (D-Worthington); Unopposed	100%	71%
2	Christopher Donelan (D)	Orange	Running	Christopher Donelan (D-Orange); Unopposed	100%	76%

== Hampden County ==
District	Incumbent	Hometown	Incumbent Status	Competing candidates	2006 Result	Vote % of winner in 2004
1	Todd M. Smola (R)	Palmer	Running	Todd M. Smola (R-Palmer); Unopposed	100%	63%
2	Mary S. Rogeness (R)	Longmeadow	Running	Mary S. Rogeness (R-Longmeadow); Unopposed	100%	100%
3	Daniel F. Keenan (D)	Southwick	Resigned	Rosemary Sandlin (D-Agawam); Robert Magovern (R-Agawam); Owen Broadhurst (G-Agawam); Joseph Schebel (I-Agawam)	50% 40% 3% 7%	72%
4	Donald F. Humason Jr. (R)	Westfield	Running	Donald F. Humason Jr. (R-Westfield); Unopposed	100%	100%
5	Michael F. Kane (D)	Holyoke	Running	Michael F. Kane (D-Holyoke); Unopposed	100%	100%
6	James T. Welch (D)	West Springfield	Running	James T. Welch (D-West Springfield); Unopposed	100%	64%
7	Thomas M. Petrolati (D)	Ludlow	Running	Thomas M. Petrolati (D-Ludlow); Unopposed	100%	100%
8	Joseph F. Wagner (D)	Chicopee	Running	Joseph F. Wagner (D-Chicopee); Robert Sliski (I-Chicopee)	81% 19%	82%
9	Sean Curran (D)	Springfield	Running	Sean Curran (D-Springfield); Robert J. Underwood (L-Springfield); Megan Anzalotti (I-Springfield)	77% 18% 5%	100%
10	Cheryl A. Rivera (D)	Springfield	Running	Cheryl A. Rivera (D-Springfield); George Vazquez (R-Springfield); Kyle Burns (I-Springfield)	79% 15% 6%	72%
11	Benjamin Swan (D)	Springfield	Running	Benjamin Swan (D-Springfield); Unopposed	100%	79%
12	Gale D. Candaras (D)	Wilbraham	Running for State Senate	Angelo Puppolo (D-Springfield); Christopher Leisey (R-Wilbraham)	59% 41%	63%

== Hampshire County ==
District	Incumbent	Hometown	Incumbent Status	Competing candidates	2006 Result	Vote % of winner in 2004
1	Peter V. Kocot (D)	Northampton	Running	Peter V. Kocot (D-Northampton); John Andrulis (R-Northampton)	82% 18%	80%
2	John W. Scibak (D)	South Hadley	Running	John W. Scibak (D-South Hadley); Unopposed	100%	100%
3	Ellen Story (D)	Amherst	Running	Ellen Story (D-Amherst); Unopposed	100%	78%

== Middlesex County ==
District	Incumbent	Hometown	Incumbent Status	Competing candidates	2006 Result	Vote % of winner in 2004
1	Robert Hargraves (R)	Groton	Running	Robert Hargraves (R-Groton); Carol Bousquet (D-Ayer)	60% 40%	99%
2	Geoffrey Hall (D)	Westford	Running	Geoffrey Hall (D-Westford); Unopposed	100%	55%
3	Patricia Walrath (D)	Stow	Running	Patricia Walrath (D-Stow); Unopposed	100%	74%
4	Stephen LeDuc (D)	Marlborough	Running	Stephen LeDuc (D-Marlborough); Unopposed	100%	71%
5	David Paul Linsky (D)	Natick	Running	David Paul Linsky (D-Natick); William Whittlesey (R-Sherborn)	65% 35%	68%
6	Deborah Blumer (D)	Framingham	Deceased	Deborah Blumer (D-Framingham) Unopposed; Pam Richardson(D-Framingham) write-in Nick Sanchez (R-Framingham) write-in Dawn Harkness (I-Framingham) write-in Jim Rizoli (R-Framingham) write-in Tom Tierney (R-Framingham) write-in Jerry Bloomfield (I-Framingham) write-in	20% 37% 27% 7% 4% 3% 2%	62%
7	Tom Sannicandro (D)	Ashland	Running	Tom Sannicandro (D-Ashland); Unopposed	100%	63%
8	Paul J. P. Loscocco (R)	Holliston	Running	Paul J. P. Loscocco (R-Holliston); Unopposed	100%	100%
9	Thomas M. Stanley (D)	Waltham	Running	Thomas M. Stanley (D-Waltham); Unopposed	100%	60%
10	Peter Koutoujian (D)	Newton	Running	Peter Koutoujian (D-Newton); Dara Pourghasemi (R-Waltham)	82% 18%	100%
11	Kay Khan (D)	Newton	Running	Kay Khan (D-Newton); Unopposed	100%	73%
12	Ruth Balser (D)	Newton	Running	Ruth Balser (D-Newton); Unopposed	100%	100%
13	Susan W. Pope (R)	Wayland	Running	Susan W. Pope (R-Wayland); Thomas Conroy (D-Wayland)	49% 51%	52%
14	Cory Atkins (D)	Concord	Running	Cory Atkins (D-Concord); Unopposed	100%	60%
15	Jay R. Kaufman (D)	Lexington	Running	Jay R. Kaufman (D-Lexington); Unopposed	100%	70%
16	Thomas Golden Jr. (D)	Lowell	Running	Thomas Golden Jr. (D-Lowell); Matthew Prahl (R-Lowell)	77% 23%	100%
17	David Nangle (D)	Lowell	Running	David Nangle (D-Lowell); Unopposed	100%	78%
18	Kevin J. Murphy (D)	Lowell	Running	Kevin J. Murphy (D-Lowell); Unopposed	100%	100%
19	Jim Miceli (D)	Wilmington	Running	Jim Miceli (D-Wilmington); Unopposed	100%	100%
20	Bradley Jones Jr. (R)	North Reading	Running	Bradley Jones Jr. (R-North Reading); Unopposed	100%	66%
21	Charles A. Murphy (D)	Burlington	Running	Charles A. Murphy (D-Burlington); Unopposed	100%	65%
22	William Greene Jr. (D)	Billerica	Running	William Greene Jr. (D-Billerica); Unopposed	100%	62%
23	J. James Marzilli Jr. (D)	Arlington	Running	J. James Marzilli Jr. (D-Arlington); Unopposed	100%	74%
24	Anne Paulsen (D)	Belmont	Retiring	William Brownsberger (D-Belmont); Libby Firenze (R-Belmont)	68% 32%	75%
25	Alice Wolf (D)	Cambridge	Running	Alice Wolf (D-Cambridge); Henry Irving (R-Cambridge)	89% 11%	82%
26	Timothy Toomey Jr. (D)	Cambridge	Running	Timothy Toomey Jr. (D-Cambridge); Unopposed	100%	86%
27	Denise Provost (D)	Somerville	Running	Denise Provost (D-Somerville); Unopposed	100%	81%
28	Edward Connolly (D)	Everett	Deceased	Stephen Smith (D-Everett); Joseph Hickey (I-Everett)	60% 40%	100%
29	Rachel Kaprielian (D)	Watertown	Running	Rachel Kaprielian (D-Watertown); Keith Mercurio (R-Watertown); Thomas Geary (I-Watertown)	72% 25% 3%	100%
30	Patrick M. Natale (D)	Woburn	Running	Patrick M. Natale (D-Woburn); Unopposed	100%	62%
31	Paul C. Casey (D)	Winchester	Running	Paul C. Casey (D-Winchester); Unopposed	100%	62%
32	Michael Festa (D)	Melrose	Running	Michael Festa (D-Melrose); Unopposed	100%	67%
33	Christopher Fallon (D)	Malden	Running	Christopher Fallon (D-Malden); Unopposed	100%	100%
34	Carl M. Sciortino Jr. (D)	Somerville	Running	Carl M. Sciortino Jr. (D-Somerville); Unopposed	100%	68%
35	Paul Donato (D)	Medford	Running	Paul Donato (D-Medford); Unopposed	100%	66%
36	Colleen Garry (D)	Dracut	Running	Colleen Garry (D-Dracut); Unopposed	100%	100%
37	James B. Eldridge (D)	Acton	Running	James B. Eldridge (D-Acton); Kevin Hayes (R-Shirley)	64% 36%	63%

== Norfolk County ==
District	Incumbent	Hometown	Incumbent Status	Competing candidates	2006 Result	Vote % of winner in 2004
1	Bruce J. Ayers (D)	Quincy	Running	Bruce J. Ayers (D-Quincy); Unopposed	100%	78%
2	A. Stephen Tobin (D)	Quincy	Running	A. Stephen Tobin (D-Quincy); Unopposed	100%	100%
3	Ronald Mariano (D)	Quincy	Running	Ronald Mariano (D-Quincy); Unopposed	100%	100%
4	James M. Murphy (D)	Weymouth	Running	James M. Murphy (D-Weymouth); Robert Montgomery Thomas (R-Weymouth)	71% 29%	68%
5	Joseph R. Driscoll (D)	Braintree	Running	Joseph R. Driscoll (D-Braintree); Unopposed	100%	72%
6	William C. Galvin (D)	Canton	Running	William C. Galvin (D-Canton); Unopposed	100%	67%
7	Walter Timilty (D)	Milton	Running	Walter Timilty (D-Milton); Unopposed	100%	100%
8	Louis Kafka (D)	Stoughton	Running	Louis Kafka (D-Stoughton); Lydia Wiener (R-Sharon)	73% 27%	100%
9	Richard J. Ross (R)	Wrentham	Running	Richard J. Ross (R-Wrentham); Unopposed	100%	56%
10	James Vallee (D)	Franklin	Running	James Vallee (D-Franklin); Unopposed	100%	100%
11	Robert Coughlin (D)	Dedham	Running	Robert Coughlin (D-Dedham); Unopposed	100%	100%
12	John H. Rogers (D)	Norwood	Running	John H. Rogers (D-Norwood); Unopposed	100%	100%
13	Lida Harkins (D)	Needham	Running	Lida Harkins (D-Needham); Unopposed	100%	100%
14	Alice Hanlon Peisch (D)	Wellesley	Running	Alice Hanlon Peisch (D-Wellesley); Unopposed	100%	62%
15	Frank Smizik (D)	Brookline	Running	Frank Smizik (D-Brookline); Unopposed	100%	100%

== Plymouth County ==
District	Incumbent	Hometown	Incumbent Status	Competing candidates	2006 Result	Vote % of winner in 2004
1	Viriato Manuel deMacedo (R)	Plymouth	Running	Viriato Manuel deMacedo (R-Plymouth); Unopposed	100%	62%
2	Susan Williams Gifford (R)	Wareham	Running	Susan Williams Gifford (R-Wareham); Margaret Ishihara (D-Wareham)	57% 43%	52%
3	Garrett Bradley (D)	Hingham	Running	Garrett Bradley (D-Hingham); Unopposed	100%	94%
4	Frank Hynes (D)	Marshfield	Running	Frank Hynes (D-Marshfield); Unopposed	100%	100%
5	Robert Nyman (D)	Hanover	Running	Robert Nyman (D-Hanover); Timothy Gillespie (R-Hanover)	63% 37%	100%
6	Daniel K. Webster (R)	Hanson	Running	Daniel K. Webster (R-Hanson); Gregory Hanley (D-Pembroke)	52% 48%	100%
7	Kathleen Teahan (D)	Whitman	Retiring	Allen McCarthy (D-East Bridgewater); Andrew Burbine (R-Abington)	52% 48%	65%
8	David Flynn (D)	Bridgewater	Running	David Flynn (D-Bridgewater); Unopposed	100%	58%
9	Thomas P. Kennedy (D)	Brockton	Running	Thomas P. Kennedy (D-Brockton); Unopposed	100%	100%
10	Christine Canavan (D)	Brockton	Running	Christine Canavan (D-Brockton); Unopposed	100%	71%
11	Geraldine Creedon (D)	Brockton	Running	Geraldine Creedon (D-Brockton); Unopposed	100%	69%
12	Thomas J. O'Brien (D)	Kingston	Declined Primary nomination after becoming Plymouth County Treasurer	Thomas Calter (D-Kingston); Olly deMacedo (R-Kingston)	51% 49%	69%

== Suffolk County ==
District	Incumbent	Hometown	Incumbent Status	Competing candidates	2006 Result	Vote % of winner in 2004
1	Anthony Petruccelli (D)	Boston	Running	Anthony Petruccelli (D-Boston); Unopposed	100%	88%
2	Eugene O'Flaherty (D)	Chelsea	Running	Eugene O'Flaherty (D-Chelsea); Unopposed	100%	100%
3	Salvatore DiMasi (D)	Boston	Running	Salvatore DiMasi (D-Boston); Kenneth Procaccianti (R-Boston)	79% 21%	100%
4	Brian Wallace (D)	Boston	Running	Brian Wallace (D-Boston); Unopposed	100%	100%
5	Marie St. Fleur (D)	Boston	Running	Marie St. Fleur (D-Boston); Althea Garrison (R-Boston)	84% 16%	100%
6	Shirley Owens-Hicks (D)	Boston	Retiring	Willie Mae Allen (D-Boston); Unopposed	100%	100%
7	Gloria Fox (D)	Boston	Running	Gloria Fox (D-Boston); Unopposed	100%	100%
8	Martha M. Walz (D)	Boston	Running	Martha M. Walz (D-Boston); Unopposed	100%	75%
9	Byron Rushing (D)	Boston	Running	Byron Rushing (D-Boston); Unopposed	100%	100%
10	Michael Rush (D)	Boston	Running	Michael Rush (D-Boston); Unopposed	100%	81%
11	Elizabeth Malia (D)	Boston	Running	Elizabeth Malia (D-Boston); Unopposed	100%	100%
12	Linda Dorcena Forry (D)	Boston	Running	Linda Dorcena Forry (D-Boston); Unopposed	100%	100%
13	Marty Walsh (D)	Boston	Running	Marty Walsh (D-Boston); Unopposed	100%	89%
14	Angelo Scaccia (D)	Boston	Running	Angelo Scaccia (D-Boston); Unopposed	100%	81%
15	Jeffrey Sanchez (D)	Boston	Running	Jeffrey Sanchez (D-Boston); Unopposed	100%	100%
16	Kathi-Anne Reinstein (D)	Revere	Running	Kathi-Anne Reinstein (D-Revere); Carlos J. Rodriguez (I-Chelsea)		100%
17	Kevin Honan (D)	Boston	Running	Kevin Honan (D-Boston); Unopposed	100%	100%
18	Michael Moran (D)	Boston	Running	Michael Moran (D-Boston); Russell Evans (R-Brookline)	81% 19%	100%
19	Robert A. DeLeo (D)	Winthrop	Running	Robert A. DeLeo (D-Winthrop); Unopposed	100%	78%

== Worcester County ==
District	Incumbent	Hometown	Incumbent Status	Competing candidates	2006 Result	Vote % of winner in 2004
1	Lewis G. Evangelidis (R)	Holden	Running	Lewis Evangelidis (R-Holden); Nate Kaplan (D-Hubbardston)	69% 31%	100%
2	Robert L. Rice (D)	Gardner	Running	Robert L. Rice (D-Gardner); Unopposed	100%	100%
3	Emile Goguen (D)	Fitchburg	Retiring	Stephen Louis DiNatale (D-Fitchburg); Edward Niemczura (R-Fitchburg)	77% 23%	100%
4	Jennifer L. Flanagan (D)	Leominster	Running	Jennifer L. Flanagan (D-Leominster); Claire Freda (I-Leominster)	62% 38%	69%
5	Anne Gobi (D)	Spencer	Running	Anne Gobi (D-Spencer); Stephen Comtois (R-Brookfield)	69% 31%	69%
6	Mark Carron (D)	Southbridge	Retiring	Geraldo Alicea (D-Charlton); David Singer (R-Charlton)	55% 45%	65%
7	Paul Frost (R)	Auburn	Running	Paul Frost (R-Auburn); Unopposed	100%	100%
8	Paul Kujawski (D)	Webster	Running	Paul Kujawski (D-Webster); Unopposed	100%	59%
9	George N. Peterson Jr. (R)	Grafton	Running	George N. Peterson Jr. (R-Grafton); Unopposed	100%	65%
10	Marie Parente (D)	Milford	Lost Primary	John Fernandes (D-Milford); Robert Burns (R-Hopedale)	65% 35%	100%
11	Karyn Polito (R)	Shrewsbury	Running	Karyn Polito (R-Shrewsbury); Unopposed	100%	100%
12	Harold Naughton Jr. (D)	Clinton	Running	Harold Naughton Jr. (D-Clinton); Unopposed	100%	65%
13	Robert Spellane (D)	Worcester	Running	Robert Spellane (D-Worcester); Unopposed	100%	100%
14	James Leary (D)	Worcester	Running	James Leary (D-Worcester); Joseph Rice (R-Worcester)	74% 26%	100%
15	Vincent Pedone (D)	Worcester	Running	Vincent Pedone (D-Worcester); Unopposed	100%	100%
16	John Fresolo (D)	Worcester	Running	John Fresolo (D-Worcester); Unopposed	100%	76%
17	John Binienda (D)	Worcester	Running	John Binienda (D-Worcester); Unopposed	100%	100%
18	Jennifer Callahan (D)	Sutton	Running	Jennifer Callahan (D-Sutton); Unopposed	100%	73%

== See also ==
- List of Massachusetts General Courts

== Sources ==
- http://www.mass.gov/legis/repdis03.htm, accessed March 11, 2006
- Office of Campaign and Political Finance Commonwealth of Massachusetts http://www.mass.gov/ocpf/, accessed March 11, 2006
- sec.state.ma.us accessed September 29, 2006
