= 2007–2008 Massachusetts legislature =

185th Massachusetts General Court
| ← | 184th | 186th | → |

Overview
- Legislative body: General Court
- Term: January 3, 2007 – January 6, 2009
- Election: 2006 Massachusetts general election

Senate
- Members: 40
- President: Therese Murray
- Majority Leader: Frederick Berry
- Majority Whip: Joan Menard
- Minority Leader: Richard Tisei
- Minority Whip: Bruce Tarr
- Party control: Democrat

House
- Members: 160
- Speaker: Salvatore DiMasi
- Majority Leader: John H. Rogers
- Majority Whip: Lida E. Harkins
- Minority Leader: Bradley Jones Jr.
- Minority Whip: George N. Peterson Jr.
- Party control: Democrat

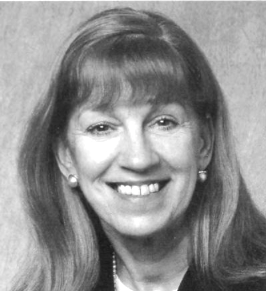
Therese Murray, Senate president.

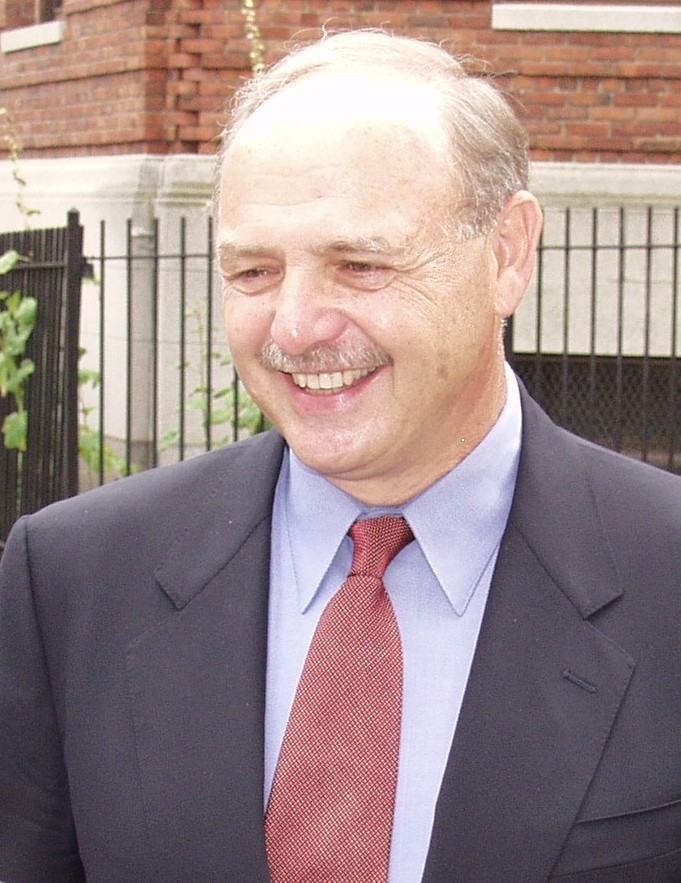
Salvatore DiMasi, House speaker.

Leaders of the Massachusetts General Court, 2007-2008.

The 185th Massachusetts General Court, consisting of the Massachusetts Senate and the Massachusetts House of Representatives, met in 2007 and 2008 during the governorship of Deval Patrick. Therese Murray served as president of the Senate and Salvatore DiMasi served as speaker of the House.

Notable activities included new webcasting of Senate formal sessions and repeal of "a 1913 law declaring that nonresidents could not marry in Massachusetts if the marriage would not be legal in their home states."

== Senators ==
| portrait | name | date of birth | district |
|---|---|---|---|
| | Robert A. Antonioni | July 15, 1958 | |
| | Edward M. Augustus Jr. | March 31, 1964 | 2nd Worcester |
| | Steven Baddour | 1969 | |
| | Frederick Berry | December 20, 1949 | |
| | Stephen Brewer | February 10, 1948 | |
| | Scott Brown (politician) | September 12, 1959 | |
| | Stephen Buoniconti | September 4, 1969 | |
| | Gale D. Candaras | 1949 | |
| | Harriette L. Chandler | December 20, 1937 | |
| | Robert Creedon | November 13, 1942 | |
| | Cynthia Stone Creem | September 17, 1942 | |
| | Benjamin Downing | September 11, 1981 | |
| | Susan Fargo | August 27, 1942 | |
| | Anthony D. Galluccio | 1969 | |
| | Jack Hart (state senator) | April 21, 1961 | |
| | Robert L. Hedlund | July 12, 1961 | |
| | Patricia D. Jehlen | October 14, 1943 | |
| | Brian A. Joyce | September 5, 1962 | |
| | Michael Knapik | February 11, 1963 | |
| | Jim Marzilli | May 8, 1958 | |
| | Thomas M. McGee | December 15, 1955 | |
| | Joan Menard | September 6, 1935 | |
| | Mark Montigny | June 20, 1961 | |
| | Richard T. Moore | August 7, 1943 | |
| | Michael W. Morrissey | August 2, 1954 | |
| | Therese Murray | October 10, 1947 | |
| | Robert O'Leary | January 24, 1946 | |
| | Marc Pacheco | October 29, 1952 | |
| | Steven C. Panagiotakos | November 26, 1959 | |
| | Anthony Petruccelli | October 2, 1972 | |
| | Pam Resor | 1942 | |
| | Stan Rosenberg | October 12, 1949 | |
| | Karen Spilka | January 11, 1953 | |
| | Bruce Tarr | January 2, 1964 | |
| | James E. Timilty | | |
| | Richard Tisei | August 13, 1962 | |
| | Steven Tolman | October 2, 1954 | |
| | Susan Tucker (politician) | November 7, 1944 | |
| | Marian Walsh | 1954 | |
| | Dianne Wilkerson | May 2, 1955 | |

== Representatives ==
| portrait | name | date of birth | district |
|---|---|---|---|
| | Kevin Aguiar | 1972 | 7th Bristol |
| | Geraldo Alicea | September 27, 1963 | |
| | Willie Mae Allen | February 11, 1937 | |
| | Cory Atkins | February 10, 1949 | |
| | Demetrius Atsalis | March 31, 1964 | |
| | Bruce Ayers | April 17, 1962 | |
| | Ruth Balser | October 30, 1948 | |
| | F. Jay Barrows | April 5, 1956 | |
| | Carlo Basile | June 29, 1971 | |
| | John Binienda | June 22, 1947 | |
| | Daniel E. Bosley | December 9, 1953 | |
| | Garrett Bradley | July 4, 1970 | |
| | Will Brownsberger | March 21, 1957 | |
| | Antonio Cabral | January 26, 1955 | |
| | Jennifer Callahan | August 24, 1964 | |
| | Thomas Calter | | |
| | Linda Dean Campbell | | |
| | Christine Canavan | January 25, 1950 | |
| | Stephen Canessa | 1980 | |
| | Paul Casey | February 26, 1961 | |
| | Katherine Clark | July 17, 1963 | |
| | Cheryl Coakley-Rivera | February 21, 1964 | |
| | Tom Conroy | July 7, 1962 | |
| | Michael A. Costello | May 5, 1965 | |
| | Geraldine Creedon | September 26, 1945 | |
| | Sean Curran (politician) | August 23, 1977 | |
| | Steven D'Amico | February 21, 1953 | |
| | Robert DeLeo (politician) | March 27, 1950 | |
| | Vinny deMacedo | October 16, 1965 | |
| | Brian Dempsey (politician) | September 30, 1966 | |
| | Salvatore DiMasi | August 11, 1945 | |
| | Stephen DiNatale | | |
| | Paul Donato | October 27, 1941 | |
| | Christopher Donelan | December 25, 1964 | |
| | Joseph R. Driscoll | 1970 | |
| | Lori Ehrlich | June 9, 1963 | |
| | Jamie Eldridge | August 11, 1973 | |
| | Lewis Evangelidis | July 11, 1961 | |
| | James H. Fagan | October 13, 1947 | |
| | Christopher Fallon | June 7, 1953 | |
| | Mark Falzone | June 14, 1975 | |
| | Robert Fennell | June 26, 1956 | |
| | John V. Fernandes | November 16, 1952 | |
| | Barry Finegold | March 3, 1971 | |
| | Jennifer Flanagan | September 5, 1975 | |
| | Marie St. Fleur | May 4, 1962 | |
| | David Lawrence Flynn | February 5, 1933 | |
| | Linda Dorcena Forry | November 1, 1973 | |
| | Gloria Fox | March 18, 1942 | |
| | John Fresolo | October 11, 1964 | |
| | Paul Frost | April 25, 1970 | |
| | William C. Galvin | October 18, 1956 | |
| | Sean Garballey | February 22, 1985 | |
| | Colleen Garry | July 21, 1962 | |
| | Susan Williams Gifford | November 3, 1959 | |
| | Anne Gobi | December 27, 1962 | |
| | Thomas Golden Jr. | March 5, 1971 | |
| | Mary E. Grant | January 10, 1953 | |
| | William G. Greene Jr. | April 24, 1940 | |
| | Denis Guyer | July 11, 1966 | |
| | Patricia Haddad | May 7, 1950 | |
| | Geoff Hall (politician) | October 10, 1948 | |
| | Robert S. Hargraves | October 14, 1936 | |
| | Lida E. Harkins | January 24, 1944 | |
| | Bradford Hill | January 22, 1967 | |
| | Kevin Honan | June 5, 1958 | |
| | Donald Humason Jr. | July 31, 1967 | |
| | Frank Hynes | December 23, 1940 | |
| | Bradley Jones Jr. | January 9, 1965 | |
| | Louis Kafka | November 28, 1945 | |
| | Michael F. Kane | June 10, 1967 | |
| | Rachel Kaprielian | June 24, 1968 | |
| | Jay R. Kaufman | May 4, 1947 | |
| | John D. Keenan | April 4, 1965 | |
| | Thomas P. Kennedy | August 15, 1951 | |
| | Kay Khan | June 22, 1941 | |
| | Peter Kocot | September 18, 1956 | |
| | Robert Koczera | November 25, 1953 | |
| | Peter Koutoujian | September 17, 1961 | |
| | Paul Kujawski | August 26, 1953 | |
| | Stephen Kulik | August 3, 1950 | |
| | Barbara L'Italien | January 3, 1961 | |
| | William Lantigua | February 19, 1955 | |
| | John Lepper | December 22, 1934 | |
| | David Linsky | October 16, 1957 | |
| | Paul Loscocco | March 7, 1962 | |
| | Liz Malia | September 30, 1949 | |
| | Ronald Mariano | October 31, 1946 | |
| | Allen McCarthy | February 24, 1970 | |
| | Paul McMurtry | October 28, 1965 | |
| | Jim Miceli | March 25, 1935 | |
| | Michael Moran (Massachusetts politician) | February 23, 1971 | |
| | Charles A. Murphy | August 11, 1965 | |
| | James M. Murphy | November 15, 1969 | |
| | Kevin J. Murphy (politician) | November 27, 1952 | |
| | David Nangle | December 18, 1960 | |
| | Patrick Natale | September 22, 1968 | |
| | Harold Naughton Jr. | July 4, 1960 | |
| | Robert Nyman | August 20, 1960 | |
| | Jim O'Day | May 23, 1954 | |
| | Eugene O'Flaherty | July 20, 1968 | |
| | Matthew Patrick (politician) | April 1, 1952 | |
| | Sarah Peake | October 4, 1957 | |
| | Vincent Pedone | March 15, 1967 | |
| | Alice Peisch | October 4, 1954 | |
| | Jeff Perry (politician) | January 8, 1964 | |
| | George N. Peterson Jr. | July 8, 1950 | |
| | Thomas Petrolati | March 16, 1957 | |
| | William "Smitty" Pignatelli | August 31, 1959 | |
| | Elizabeth Poirier | October 27, 1942 | |
| | Karyn Polito | November 11, 1966 | |
| | Denise Provost | March 9, 1951 | |
| | Angelo Puppolo | | |
| | John F. Quinn | April 7, 1963 | |
| | Kathi-Anne Reinstein | January 31, 1971 | |
| | Robert L. Rice Jr. | | |
| | Pam Richardson | | |
| | Michael Rodrigues (politician) | May 30, 1959 | |
| | Mary Rogeness | May 18, 1941 | |
| | John H. Rogers | October 22, 1964 | |
| | Richard J. Ross | July 6, 1954 | |
| | Mike Rush | November 30, 1973 | |
| | Byron Rushing | July 29, 1942 | |
| | Jeffrey Sanchez (politician) | July 18, 1969 | |
| | Rosemary Sandlin | May 31, 1946 | |
| | Tom Sannicandro | March 22, 1956 | |
| | Angelo Scaccia | September 29, 1942 | |
| | John Scibak | May 4, 1953 | |
| | Carl Sciortino | July 6, 1978 | |
| | Stephen Stat Smith | May 25, 1955 | |
| | Frank Smizik | September 4, 1944 | |
| | Todd Smola | 1977 | |
| | Theodore C. Speliotis | August 20, 1953 | |
| | Robert Spellane | March 5, 1970 | |
| | Christopher Speranzo | October 24, 1972 | |
| | Joyce Spiliotis | December 27, 1946 | |
| | Harriett Stanley | March 30, 1950 | |
| | Thomas M. Stanley | March 23, 1964 | |
| | Ellen Story | October 17, 1941 | |
| | William M. Straus | June 26, 1956 | |
| | David B. Sullivan | June 6, 1953 | |
| | Benjamin Swan | September 18, 1933 | |
| | Walter Timilty | July 19, 1969 | |
| | A. Stephen Tobin | July 3, 1956 | |
| | Timothy J. Toomey Jr. | June 7, 1953 | |
| | David Torrisi | September 18, 1968 | |
| | Eric Turkington | August 12, 1947 | |
| | Cleon Turner | December 29, 1945 | |
| | James E. Vallee | July 24, 1966 | |
| | Anthony Verga | April 26, 1935 | |
| | Joseph Wagner (Massachusetts politician) | May 7, 1960 | |
| | Brian P. Wallace | July 26, 1949 | |
| | Patricia Walrath | August 11, 1941 | |
| | Marty Walsh | April 10, 1967 | |
| | Steven Walsh | September 11, 1973 | |
| | Martha M. Walz | July 7, 1961 | |
| | Daniel K. Webster | April 2, 1964 | |
| | James T. Welch | December 22, 1975 | |
| | Alice Wolf | December 24, 1933 | |

== See also ==
- 2006 Massachusetts Senate election
- 2006 Massachusetts House of Representatives election
- List of Massachusetts General Courts
- 110th United States Congress
