= Robert Rice Stadium =

Former stadium at the University of Utah

Rice Stadium
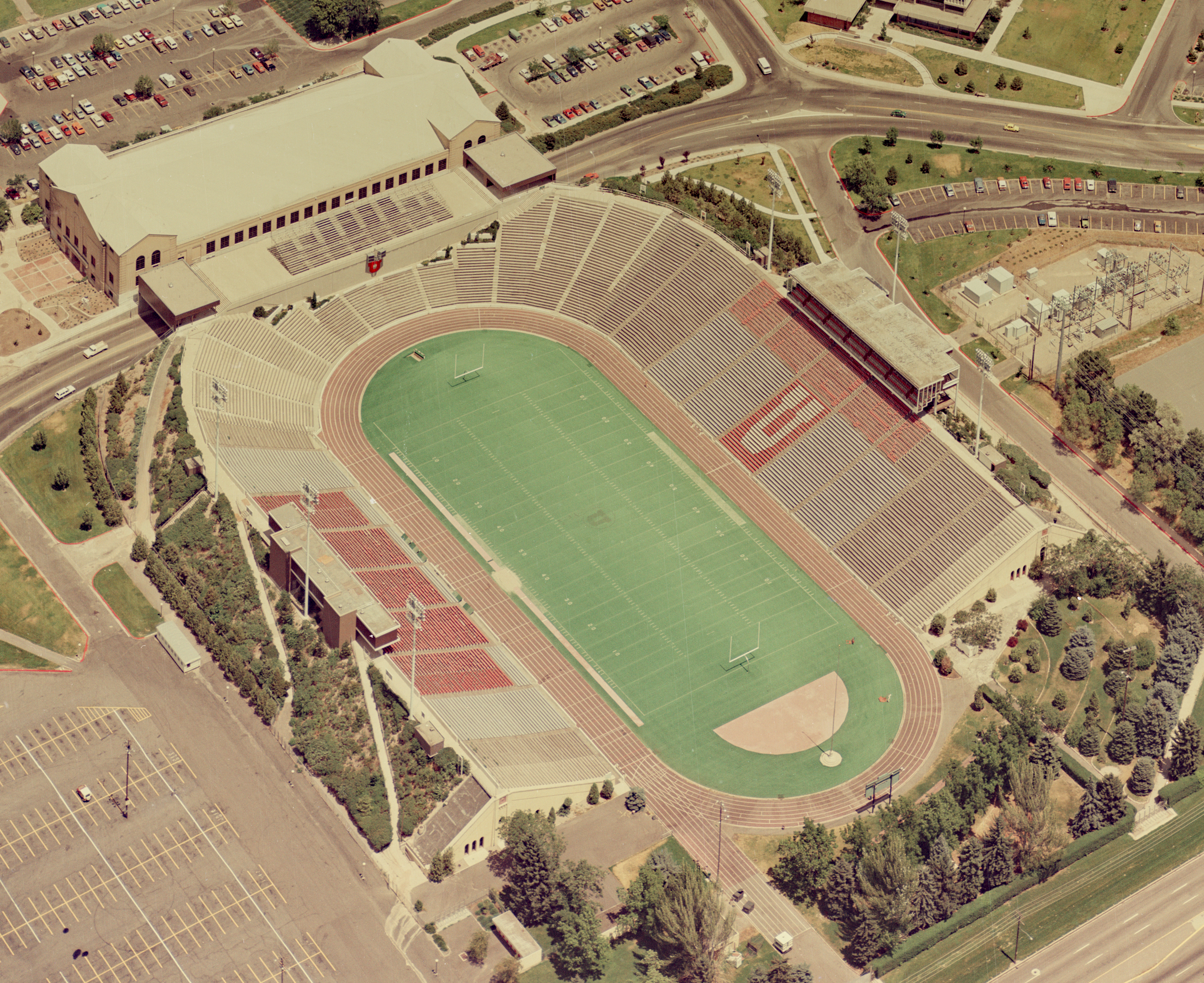
- Aerial view from southwest in 1978

- Location within the United States Location within Utah
- Interactive map of Rice Stadium
- Former names: Ute Stadium (1927–1971)
- Address: 451 South 1400 East
- Location: University of Utah; Salt Lake City, Utah, U.S.
- Coordinates: 40°45′36″N 111°50′56″W
- Elevation: 4,637 feet (1,413 m) AMSL
- Owner: University of Utah
- Operator: University of Utah
- Capacity: 32,500 (1972–1997); 30,000 (1947–1971); 20,000 (1927–1946)
- Surface: SportGrass (1995–1997); AstroTurf (1972–1994); Natural grass (1927–1971)

Construction
- Groundbreaking: February 1, 1927
- Opened: October 1, 1927; 98 years ago
- Closed: 1997; 29 years ago
- Cost: US$133,000 ($2.47 million in 2025 dollars)

Tenant
- Utah Utes (NCAA) (1927–97)

Robert Rice Stadium was an outdoor athletic stadium in the western United States, located on the campus of the University of Utah in Salt Lake City, Utah. Originally opened in 1927 as Ute Stadium, it was the home of the Utah Utes football team. Renamed for Robert L. Rice in 1972, it was almost completely demolished after the 1997 season to make way for the Utes' current home, Rice-Eccles Stadium, which occupies the same physical footprint.

== History ==
After a record crowd came to the Utes' previous home, Cummings Field, to see Utah play Utah State on Thanksgiving Day 1926, a drive began for a larger and more modern stadium. While the state house unanimously approved a loan from the state in order to build a new stadium, the state senate adjourned before taking it up. To get around the problem, the U of U formed a stadium trust that issued tax-free bonds for the new stadium. The stadium was also funded in part by selling tickets to two home games for the next 10 years. Total cost came to $133,000.

The stadium, originally named Ute Stadium, opened in 1927 with a seating capacity of 20,000. The first college football game was a 40–6 Ute victory over Colorado Mines on October 1. It was dedicated three weeks later on October 22 with a 20–13 victory over Colorado. On hand was Crown Prince Gustaf Adolf of Sweden. Originally, the stadium was built of timber and concrete, with earth-fill.

For 20 years, a giant pile of dirt stood in the north end zone. In 1947, 10,000 seats were added in the north end, turning the stadium into a horseshoe.

After the 1971 season, health club pioneer Robert L. Rice donated $1 million towards the stadium's first major facelift. 2,500 seats were added in the south end zone, and the bleachers were replaced with chairback seats. The old grass surface was replaced with AstroTurf. The dressing rooms were also remodeled, and the running track was removed. The renovated stadium was dedicated in Rice's honor with the start of the 1972 season. In 1982, the field was lowered 9.5 feet, and new seats were built along the sidelines and on the south end. After the 1994 season, the turf was replaced with SportGrass, a natural grass surface grown on top of a layer of artificial turf.

For many years, the stadium also doubled as an amphitheater during the summer.

Although it was noted as one of the more intimate venues in college football, it had become somewhat antiquated by the 1980s. By then, very few Division I-A stadiums remained by then that used timber as a major part of its construction.

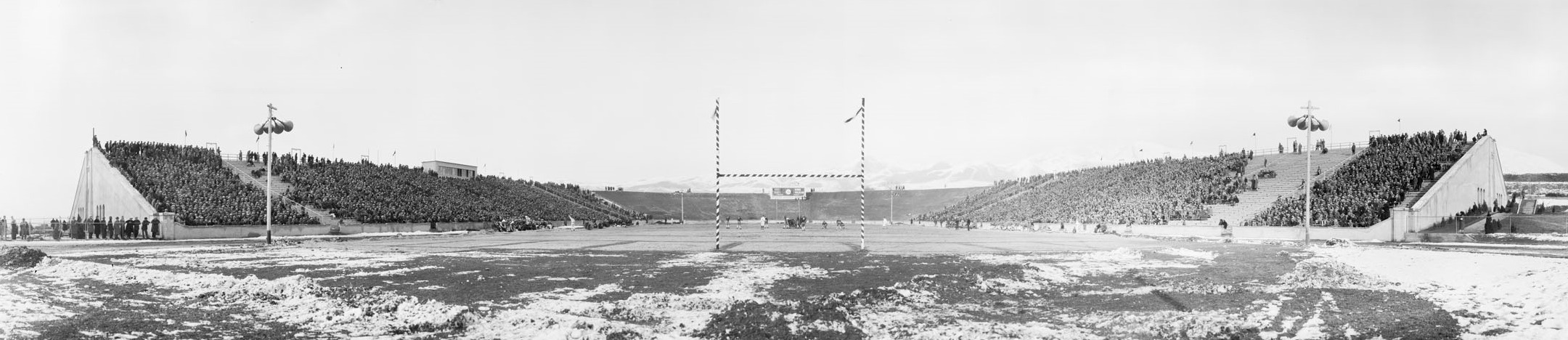
The stadium, as photographed in 1929, when it was still known as Ute Stadium and prior to any additions.

== Pro football ==
Several pro football preseason games were played at Ute Stadium.

- August 23, 1947 (AAFC) Brooklyn Dodgers 20-17 Chicago Rockets
- September 8, 1951 (NFL) Chicago Cardinals 36-21 Los Angeles Rams
- September 19, 1959 (NFL) New York Giants 17-13 San Francisco 49ers
- August 16, 1963 (NFL) St. Louis Cardinals 24-22 San Francisco 49ers
- August 22, 1964 (NFL) Minnesota Vikings 24-21 San Francisco 49ers
- August 14, 1965 (AFL) Denver Broncos 27-17 Oakland Raiders
- September 11, 1970 (NFL) Denver Broncos 16-14 Boston Patriots

== Replacement ==
After Salt Lake City was awarded the 2002 Winter Olympics in 1995, it soon became obvious that Rice Stadium was not adequate to be the main stadium. With this in mind, the athletic department decided to completely overhaul the facility to bring it up to modern standards. After the 1997 season, virtually all of the old stadium was demolished to make way for Rice-Eccles Stadium. The bleachers built in the south end zone in 1982 were all that remained of the old stadium until they were demolished after the 2019 season to make room for an expansion.

== Football attendance records ==
Attendance records
Rank	Date	Opponent	Result	Attendance
1	November 20, 1982	BYU	L 17–12	36,250
2	November 17, 1984	#3 BYU	L 24–14	36,110
3	September 13, 1986	San Diego State	L 37–30	35,982
4	November 23, 1996	#8 BYU	L 37–17	35,378
5	September 24, 1994	Wyoming	W 41–7	34,607
6	November 19, 1988	BYU	W 57–28	34,216
7	November 19, 1994	#20 BYU	W 34–31	34,139
8	November 22, 1986	BYU	L 35–21	34,128
9	August 30, 1997	Utah State	L 21–14	33,804
10	November 17, 1990	#5 BYU	L 45–22	33,515
11	November 21, 1992	BYU	L 31–22	33,348
12	October 3, 1986	Air Force	L 45–35	33,281
13	October 4, 1985	Wyoming	W 37–20	33,248
14	September 24, 1988	Hawaii	L 48–20	32,892
15	October 29, 1994	UTEP	W 52–7	32,620
