= Pedone =

Pedone is a surname. Notable people with the surname include:

- Francesco Pedone (b. 1968), Italian footballer
- Giulian Pedone (b. 1993), Swiss motorcycle racer
- Vincent Pedone (b. 1967), former American state legislator
