= Massachusetts House of Representatives' 13th Worcester district =

American legislative district

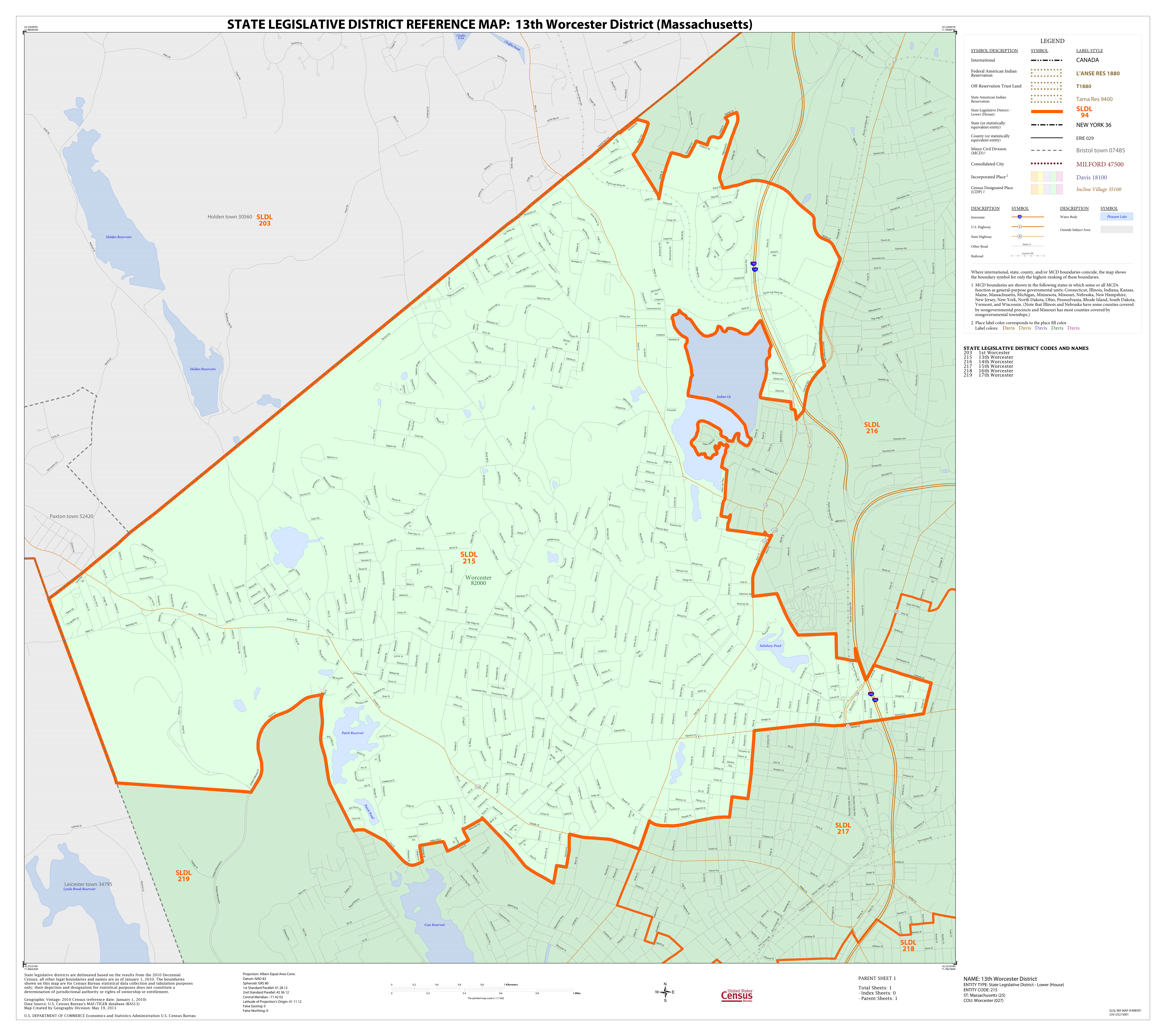
Map of Massachusetts House of Representatives' 13th Worcester district, based on the 2010 United States census.

Massachusetts House of Representatives' 13th Worcester district in the United States is one of 160 legislative districts included in the lower house of the Massachusetts General Court. It covers part of the city of Worcester in Worcester County. Democrat John Mahoney of Worcester has represented the district since 2011.

The current district geographic boundary overlaps with that of the Massachusetts Senate's 1st Worcester district.

== Representatives ==
- Joseph A. Denny, circa 1858
- John L. Bush, circa 1859
- Frank E. Holman, circa 1888
- Harrison Emmons Morton, circa 1888
- Edwin Gates Norman, circa 1920
- Joseph D. Ward, circa 1951
- Angelo Picucci, circa 1975
- Thomas P. White
- Kevin O'Sullivan
- Harriette L. Chandler
- Robert Spellane
- John J. Mahoney Jr., 2011-current

== Former locales ==
The district previously covered:

- Southborough, circa 1872
- Westborough, circa 1872

== See also ==
- List of Massachusetts House of Representatives elections
- Other Worcester County districts of the Massachusetts House of Representatives: 1st, 2nd, 3rd, 4th, 5th, 6th, 7th, 8th, 9th, 10th, 11th, 12th, 14th, 15th, 16th, 17th, 18th
- Worcester County districts of the Massachusett Senate: 1st, 2nd; Hampshire, Franklin and Worcester; Middlesex and Worcester; Worcester, Hampden, Hampshire and Middlesex; Worcester and Middlesex; Worcester and Norfolk
- List of Massachusetts General Courts
- List of former districts of the Massachusetts House of Representatives

== Images ==
Portraits of legislators

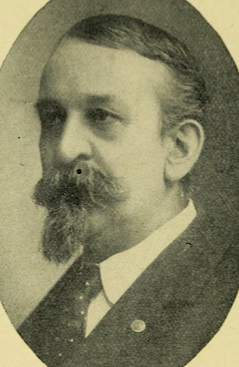
Daniel Denny

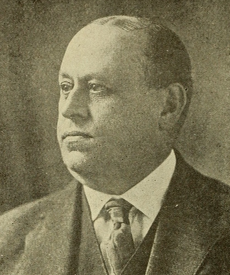
John Johnson

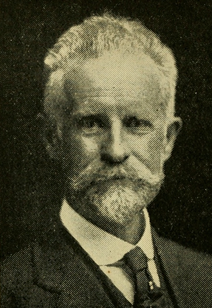
John Fenderson Kyes

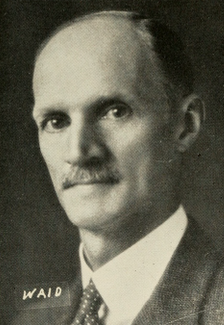
Sven Erickson

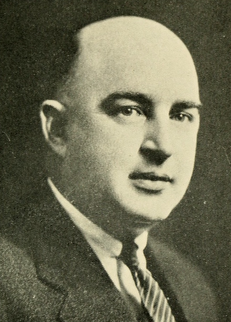
Arthur Mahan

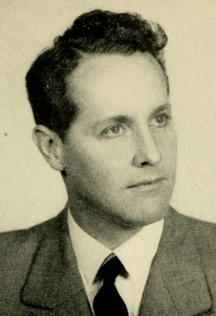
Joseph Ward

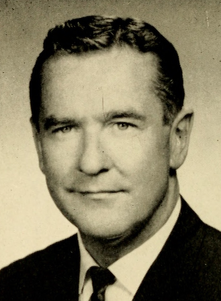
Gerald Lombard

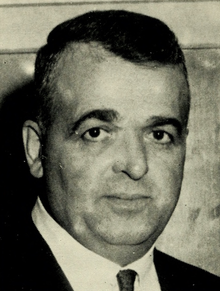
Angelo Picucci

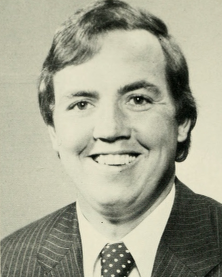
Thomas White

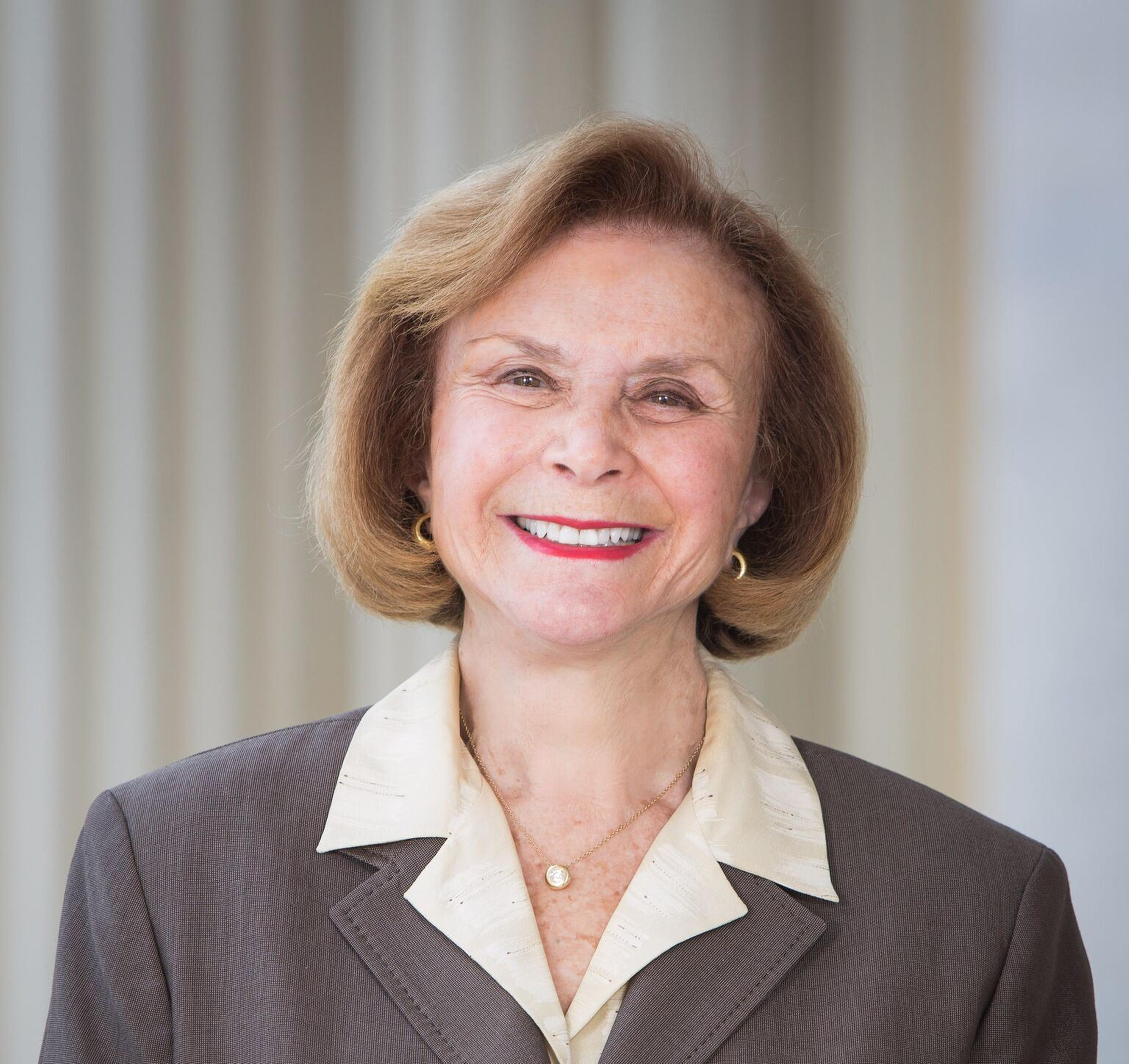
Harriette Chandler

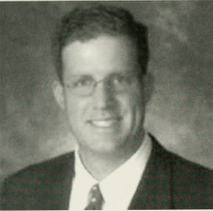
Robert Spellane
