= Harriette L. Chandler =

American politician (born 1937)

Harriette Chandler
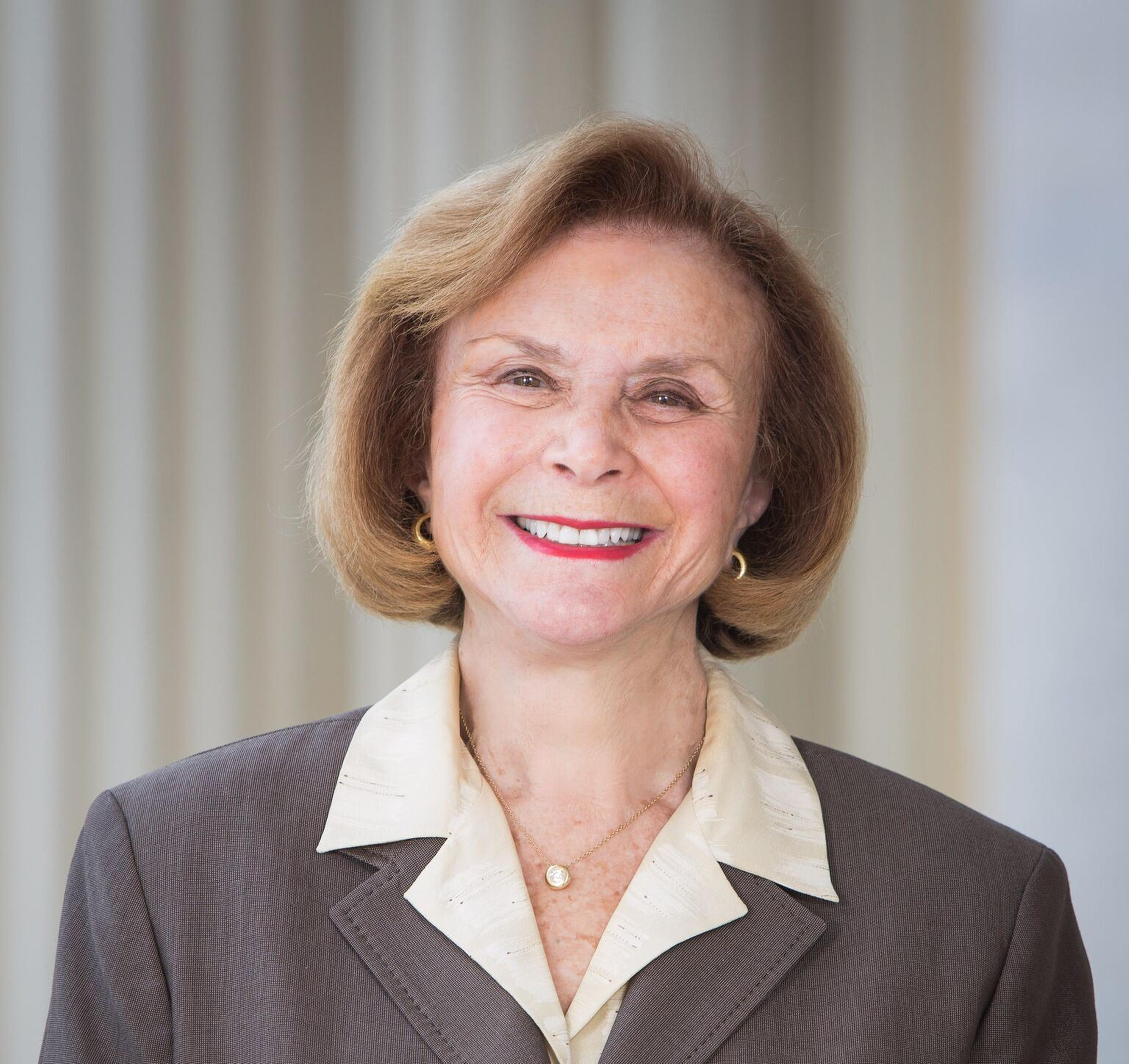

94th President of the Massachusetts Senate
- In office December 4, 2017 – July 26, 2018; Acting: December 4, 2017 – February 7, 2018
- Preceded by: Stan Rosenberg
- Succeeded by: Karen Spilka

Member of the Massachusetts Senate from the 1st Worcester district
- In office January 3, 2001 – January 4, 2023
- Preceded by: Robert A. Bernstein
- Succeeded by: Robyn Kennedy

Member of the Massachusetts House of Representatives from the 13th Worcester district
- In office January 1995 – January 2001
- Preceded by: Kevin O'Sullivan
- Succeeded by: Robert Spellane

Personal details
- Born: December 20, 1937 (age 88) Baltimore, Maryland, U.S.
- Party: Democratic
- Spouse: Burton Chandler
- Education: Wellesley College (BA); Clark University (PhD); Simmons College, Massachusetts (MBA)

Harriette L. Chandler (born December 20, 1937, in Baltimore, Maryland) is an American politician who was the 94th President of the Massachusetts Senate and the Massachusetts State Senator for the 1st Worcester district, which includes parts of the city of Worcester, where she resides, and the towns of Boylston, Holden, Princeton, and West Boylston, and parts of Clinton and Northborough. She is a Democrat who has served since January 2001. From 1995 to 2001 she was a member of the Massachusetts House of Representatives. Prior to serving in the Massachusetts legislature, she was a member of the Worcester school committee from 1991 to 1994. She is the first woman from Worcester ever to be elected to the Massachusetts Senate.

The Massachusetts Women's Political Caucus endorsed her as an incumbent candidate in the 2020 Massachusetts general election. On January 26, 2022, Chandler announced that she would retire at the end of her term.

== Leadership positions and committee assignments ==
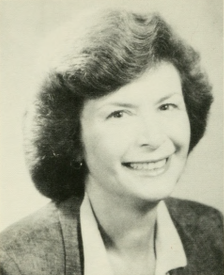
Chandler circa 1995

Chandler was the 94th President of the Massachusetts Senate. Prior to this she was the Senate Majority Leader. She was also the Senate Chair of the Joint Committee on Redistricting and Co-Chair of the Special Senate Committee on Citizen Engagement. She was recently Vice-Chair of the Special Senate Committee on Housing and member of the Senate Committee on Ethics, Senate Committee on Rules, and Joint Committee on Housing. She previously served as Senate Assistant Majority Leader and the Vice-Chair of the Senate Steering and Policy Committee. She was the second woman in Massachusetts history to serve as Assistant Majority Leader and is also the second woman in Massachusetts history to serve as Majority Leader. Chandler also served as the Senate Majority Whip, Assistant Majority Whip, Vice-Chair of the Joint Committee on Public Health, Assistant Vice-Chair of the Senate Committee on Ways and Means, Vice-Chair of the Joint Committee on Federal Stimulus Oversight, and the Vice-Chair of the Joint Committee on Veterans and Federal Affairs.

During her last two terms in the House, she was the Chair of the Joint Committee on Health Care.

== Caucuses and organizations ==
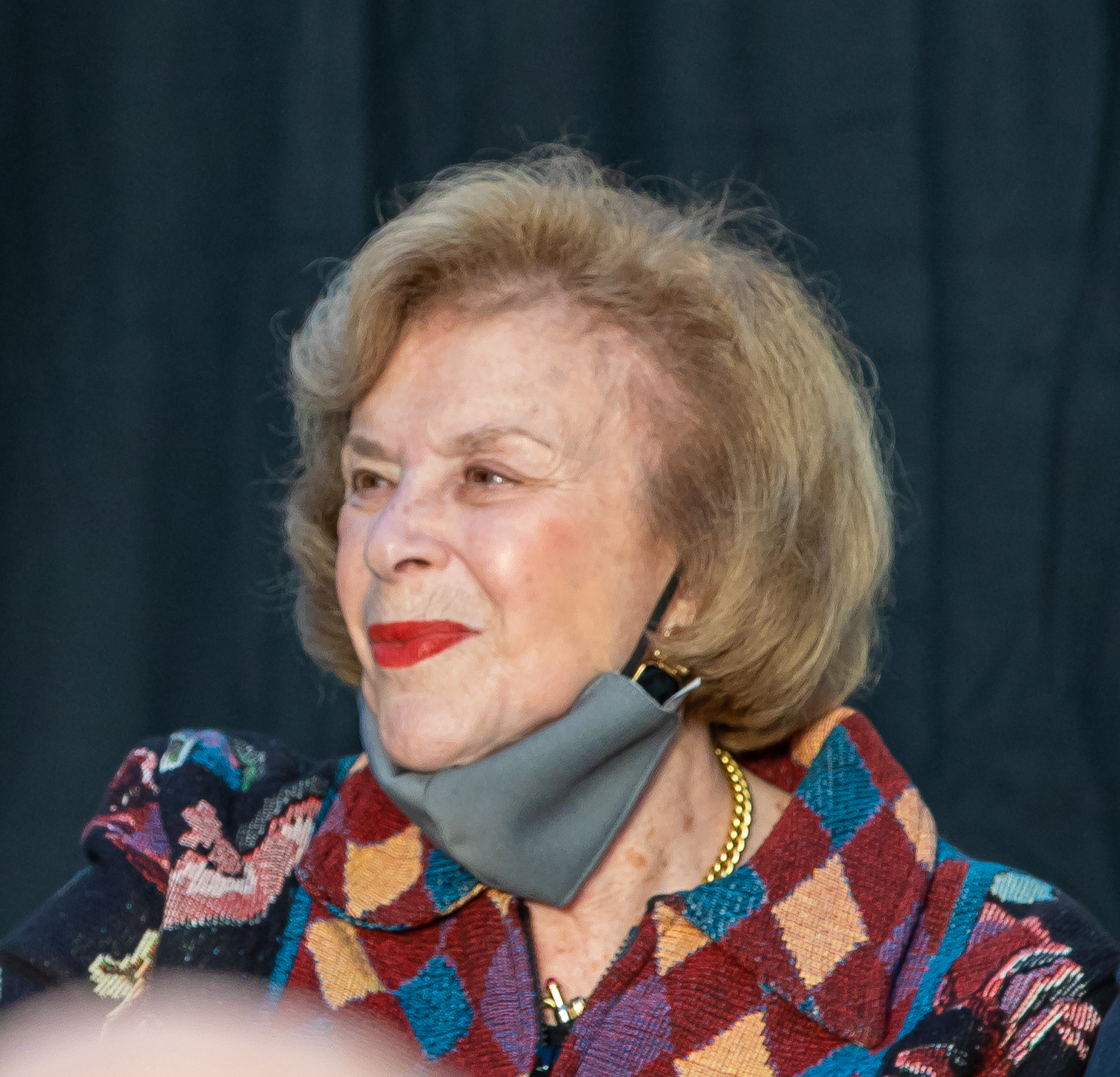
Chandler in 2021

Chandler serves as the Co-Chair of the Prevention for Health Caucus and the Legislature's Oral Health Caucus. She formerly served as Co-Chair of the Regional Transit Authority (RTA) Legislative Caucus, Co-Chair of the Central Massachusetts Caucus, Co-Chair of the Brain Injury Commission, and Co-Chair of the Caucus of Women Legislators. She is actively involved outside of the State House, having served as Co-Chair of the Reforming States Group Steering Committee, which represents members of the legislative and executive branches of state governments focusing on health care reform. She is also the Vice President of the 2015-2016 Executive Board of the Women's Legislative Network of the National Conference of State Legislatures (NCSL), a State Director of Women in Government, and corporator of the YWCA, Worcester Art Museum, and Greater Worcester Foundation. She is a member of Worcester Women's History Project, United Way of Central Massachusetts, Worcester Democratic City Committee, and the Massachusetts Democratic State Committee.

== Lawsuits ==
In November 2010, Chandler filed a defamation lawsuit against William J. Higgins Sr., her opponent in the November 2010 election. She claimed Higgins knowingly made false statements about her during the campaign that went well beyond reasonable political campaign statements. The lawsuit, and counterclaims from Higgins, were dropped in June 2011 after Higgins admitted his allegations were not true.

== Personal life ==
Senator Chandler earned degrees from Wellesley College (B.A.), Simmons College (M.B.A.), and Clark University (Ph.D.). She is married to Worcester attorney Burton Chandler and has three adult children and four grandchildren. She is Jewish. >

== See also ==
- 1995–1996 Massachusetts legislature
- 1997–1998 Massachusetts legislature
- 1999–2000 Massachusetts legislature
- 2001–2002 Massachusetts legislature
- 2003–2004 Massachusetts legislature
- 2005–2006 Massachusetts legislature
- 2007–2008 Massachusetts legislature
- 2009–2010 Massachusetts legislature
- 2011–2012 Massachusetts legislature
- 2013–2014 Massachusetts legislature
- 2015–2016 Massachusetts legislature
- 2017–2018 Massachusetts legislature
- 2019–2020 Massachusetts legislature
- 2021–2022 Massachusetts legislature
