= Massachusetts House of Representatives' 4th Plymouth district =

American legislative district

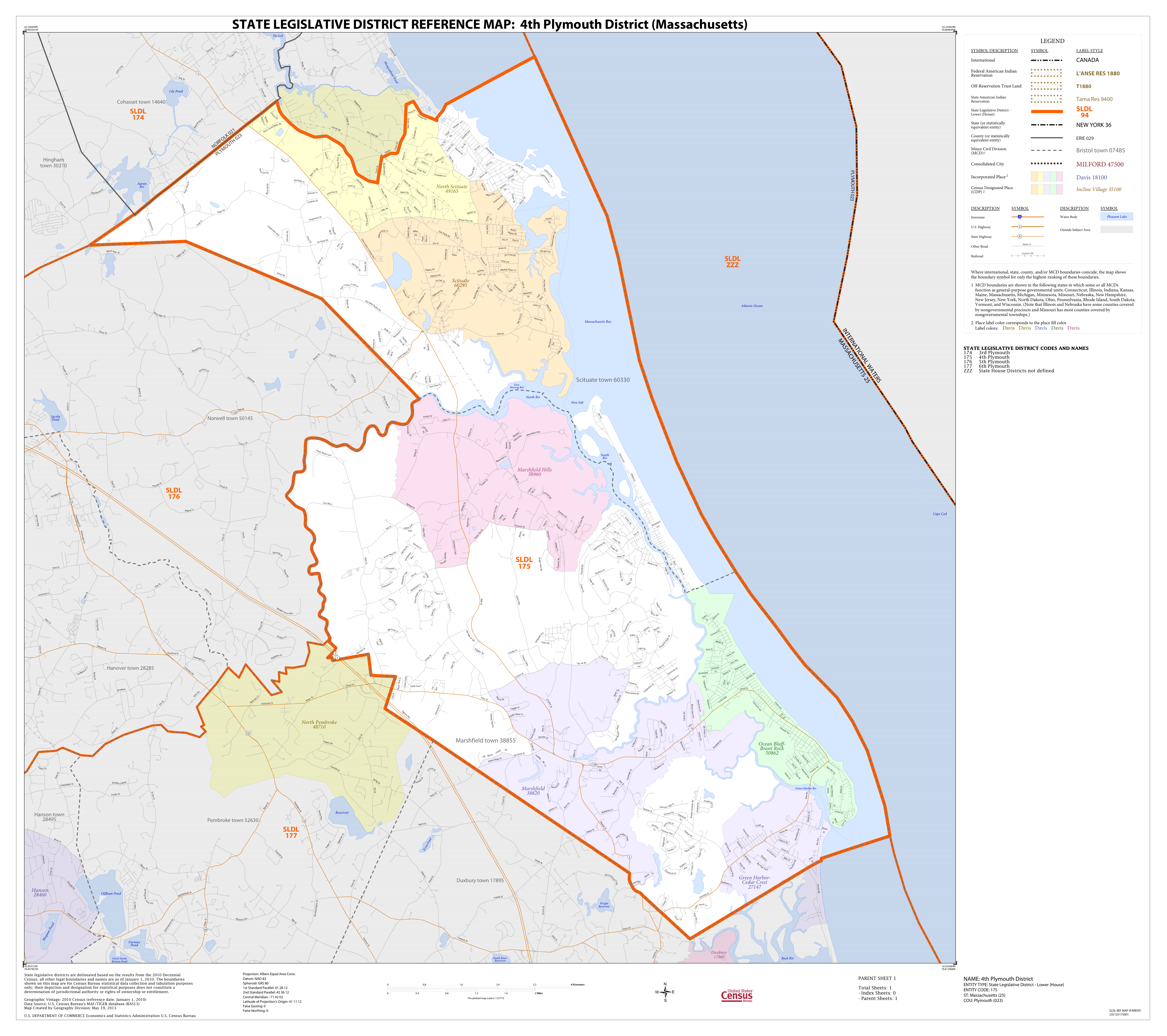
Map of Massachusetts House of Representatives' 4th Plymouth district, based on the 2010 United States census.

Massachusetts House of Representatives' 4th Plymouth district in the United States is one of 160 legislative districts included in the lower house of the Massachusetts General Court. It covers part of Plymouth County. Democrat Patrick Kearney of Scituate has represented the district since 2019.

== Towns represented ==
The district includes the following localities:

- part of Marshfield
- Scituate
- part of Norwell

The current district geographic boundary overlaps with that of the Massachusetts Senate's Plymouth and Norfolk district.

=== Former locales ===
The district previously covered:

- Halifax, circa 1872
- Pembroke, circa 1872

== Representatives ==
- Henry Blanchard, circa 1858
- Peter Salmond, circa 1859
- John Quincy Adams Lothrop, circa 1888
- Elwin Temple Wright, circa 1920
- Martha Ware, circa 1951
- John R. Buckley, circa 1975
- Frank Hynes 1983–2009
- James Cantwell
- Patrick Joseph Kearney, 2019-current

== See also ==
- List of Massachusetts House of Representatives elections
- Other Plymouth County districts of the Massachusetts House of Representatives: 1st, 2nd, 3rd, 5th, 6th, 7th, 8th, 9th, 10th, 11th, 12th
- List of Massachusetts General Courts
- List of former districts of the Massachusetts House of Representatives

== Images ==
Portraits of legislators

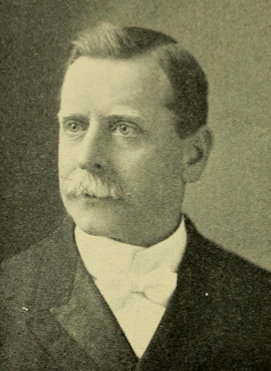
Melvin Nash

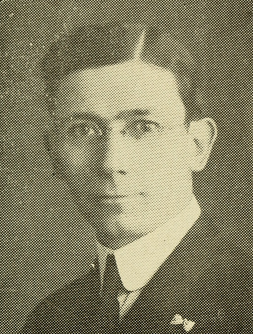
Edwin Gibson

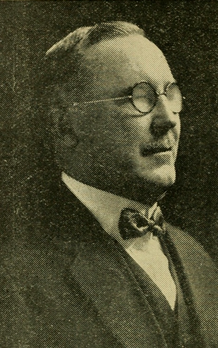
William Henry McCarthy

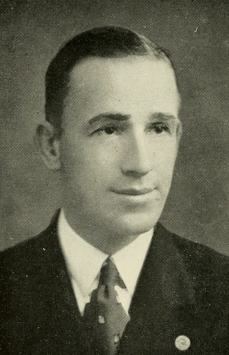
Magorisk Lawrence Walls

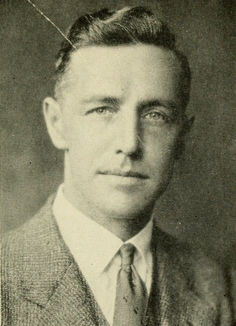
William Brown

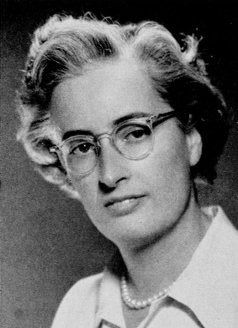
Martha Ware

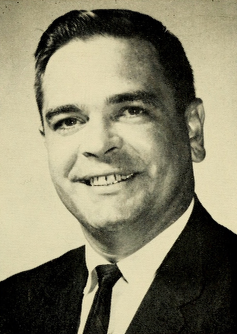
Charles Mann

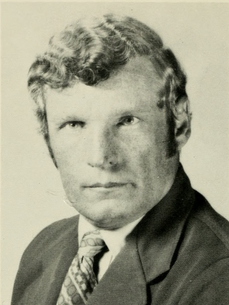
John Buckley

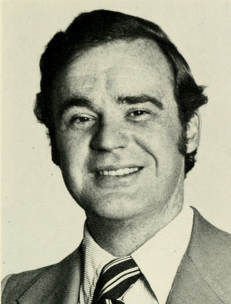
Philip Johnston

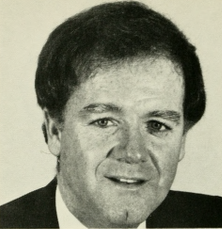
Frank Hynes

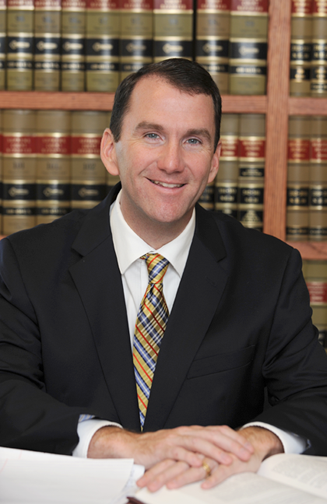
James Cantwell
