= Mary E. Grant =

American politician

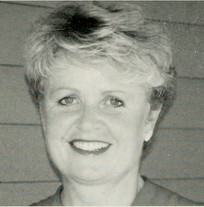

Member of the Massachusetts House of Representatives from the 6th Essex district
- In office 2003–2011
- Preceded by: Michael P. Cahill
- Succeeded by: Jerry Parisella

Personal details
- Born: January 10, 1953 (age 73) New Haven, Connecticut
- Party: Democratic
- Education: Boston College
- Occupation: Psychiatric Nurse; Politician

Mary E. Grant (born January 10, 1953, in New Haven, Connecticut) is an American psychiatric nurse and politician who represented the 6th Essex district in the Massachusetts House of Representatives from 2003 to 2011. Prior to serving in the General Court, Grant served on the City Charter Commission, Ordinance Review Committee, and High School Site Council in Beverly, Massachusetts.

== See also ==
- 2003–2004 Massachusetts legislature
- 2005–2006 Massachusetts legislature
- 2007–2008 Massachusetts legislature
- 2009–2010 Massachusetts legislature
