= Paul C. Casey =

American politician

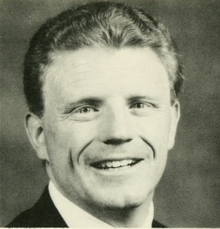
- Paul Casey in 1995

Member of the Massachusetts House of Representatives from the 31st Middlesex district
- In office 1988–2008

Personal details
- Party: Democratic
- Education: Harvard College (BA); Suffolk University (MPA); Boston University (MBA)

Paul C. Casey is an American politician who was the member of the Massachusetts House of Representatives from the 31st Middlesex district from 1988 to 2008.
