= Shaun P. Kelly =

American politician

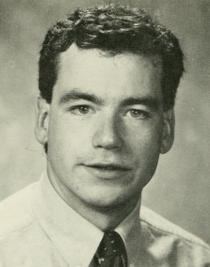

Member of the Massachusetts House of Representatives from the 2nd Berkshire district
- In office January 2, 1991 – January 5, 2005
- Preceded by: Sherwood Guernsey
- Succeeded by: Denis Guyer

Personal details
- Born: March 13, 1964 (age 62) Pittsfield, Massachusetts
- Party: Republican
- Education: Boston College

Shaun P. Kelly (born March 13, 1964, in Pittsfield, Massachusetts) is an American politician who represented the 2nd Berkshire District in the Massachusetts House of Representatives from the year 1991–2005.
