= James Cantwell =

American politician from Massachusetts

Jim Cantwell
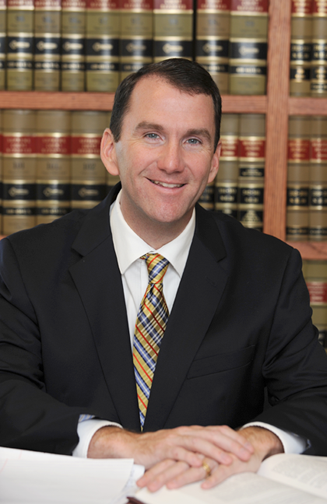

Member of the Massachusetts House of Representatives from the 4th Plymouth district
- In office January 7, 2009 – March 28, 2018
- Preceded by: Frank Hynes
- Succeeded by: Patrick J. Kearney

Personal details
- Born: James Michael Cantwell Marshfield, Massachusetts, U.S.
- Party: Democratic
- Education: Boston College (BS, JD)

James "Jim" Cantwell is an American politician and lawyer from Massachusetts. A Democrat, Cantwell is the State Director and Senior Advisor for United States Senator Ed Markey. Cantwell previously served as the Massachusetts State Representative for the 4th Plymouth district from 2008 to 2018. The district encompassed Marshfield and precincts 1, 2, 4, 5, & 6 of Scituate.

== Education and early career ==
Cantwell, a native of Marshfield, graduated from Marshfield High School in 1984. He completed his undergraduate degree from Boston College in 1988, studying abroad at the University of Paris in 1987.. He received a J.D. degree from Boston College Law School in 1994.

In his youth, Cantwell was involved in efforts to oppose the use of TCE linings in water pipes due to the risk of drinking water contamination. Through law school, Cantwell was a leader of the effort to preserve the Webster Estate as a historic site and public space.

After graduating from law school, Cantwell served as an Assistant District Attorney for Norfolk County. He was also elected to the Marshfield Select Board in 1996, winning a three-way race with 81% of the vote. He held this position for three years, including as Chairman. After his tenure at the Norfolk county District Attorney's office, Cantwell took a position as a staff attorney for United States Representative William Delahunt.

In 2000, Cantwell was the Democratic nominee for the Plymouth and Norfolk State Senate seat. The Boston Globe endorsed Cantwell, citing his offering of a "refreshingly progressive change in direction." He was narrowly defeated by the Republican incumbent Robert Hedlund.

Cantwell was also a co-owner and partner of Graeber, Davis and Cantwell, a small general-practice law firm in Quincy, Massachusetts.

== State Representative ==
=== Elections ===
Cantwell ran for the 4th Plymouth District State Representative seat in 2008 following the retirement of the incumbent, Democrat Frank Hynes. Cantwell won a 4-way primary race to face Marshfield independent candidate John Valianti in the general election. Cantwell won the election with 62% of the vote. He was also reelected in 2010, 2012, 2014, and 2016.

=== Tenure ===
Cantwell's work in the Legislature spanned a variety of issues, including cybersecurity and supporting expanded "buffer zones" for veterans' funerals protested by the Westboro Baptist Church.

==== Coastal Issues ====
Cantwell was recognized as a leader for coastal communities, serving as co-chair of the Legislature's Coastal Caucus, a board member of the National Institute for Coastal and Harbor Infrastructure (NICHI) and representing Massachusetts at the 2017 United Nations Climate Change Conference as part of the America's Pledge efforts to reaffirm American commitment to the Paris Climate Accords.

Through the Coastal Caucus, Cantwell emphasized the importance of coastal resiliency, sponsoring the creation of a special Coastal Erosion Commission and highlighting the challenges of seawall degradation. These efforts led to the passage of a multi-million dollar coastal infrastructure bond bill, later expanded upon with a $1.4 Billion environmental bond bill to support climate adaptation.

Highlighting residents whose insurance premiums were set to increase by as much as $60,000, Cantwell's advocacy placed pressure on Federal authorities (primarily FEMA) to make updates to disputed maps of flood zones and provide disaster funding under the National Flood Insurance Program, informing debate around the passage of the Homeowner Flood Insurance Affordability Act. Cantwell was recognized as the Jack Conway Company's citizen of the year for his work on flood insurance.

His advocacy for coastal communities also includes helping to create the Seafood-Marketing Committee and supporting research into fishing equipment that avoids entanglement with whales. For his work on coastal issues, Cantwell was recognized as the Massachusetts Marine Trades Association's 2016 Legislator of the Year.

==== Healthcare ====
Cantwell is noted for his work to combat the opioid epidemic, pushing for increased access to recovery coaches and co-chairing the Promote Prevent Commission created by his legislation.

The Promote Prevent Commission's work also included suicide prevention, serving as one of several forums where Cantwell sought to advocate for evidence-based solutions and promote awareness and destigmatization. He was recognized for these efforts by the Massachusetts Coalition for Suicide Prevention.

Cantwell fought to mandate insurance coverage for long-term impacts of Lyme disease.

==== Infrastructure ====
When two homes in Scituate burned down after floodwater contacted electrical equipment that was still live due to a delayed response from National Grid, Cantwell was among the first to call for a Department of Public Utilities investigation, urged DPU to impose fines, and fought to ensure those fines would be returned to affected towns.

Cantwell's also worked to get the Department of Transportation to begin a widening project for Route 139 in Marshfield.

After the Fukushima nuclear accident, Cantwell led efforts calling for more robust emergency planning surrounding the Pilgrim Nuclear Power Station. Cantwell was also critical of the lockout by Entergy during contract negotiations at Pilgrim.

==== Judiciary ====
Cantwell played a substantial role in alimony reform: sponsoring the 2017 alimony reform proposal, debating of the legislation in committee, and being cited by the Massachusetts Supreme Judicial Court's interpretation of the final law.

=== Committee assignments ===
In his final term, Cantwell served as the Vice Chair of the Joint Committee on the Judiciary, a member of the Joint Committee on Education, and a member of the Joint Committee on Health Care Financing.

In prior sessions, Cantwell sat on the Joint Committee on Ways and Means, the Joint Committee on Environment, Natural Resources, and Agriculture; the Joint Committee on Financial Services, the Joint Committee on Public Safety and Homeland Security, the House Committee on Bonding, Capital Expenditures and State Assets, the Joint Committee on Revenue, the Joint Committee on Financial Services, and the Joint Committee on Community Development and Small Business.

== Electoral history ==
=== Massachusetts State Senate, Plymouth & Norfolk District ===
2000 Massachusetts State Senate Plymouth & Norfolk Democratic primary election
Party	Candidate	Votes	%	±%
Democratic	James M. Cantwell	7,862	55	
Democratic	Ted LeClair	6,491	45	

2000 Massachusetts State Senate Plymouth & Norfolk election
Party	Candidate	Votes	%	±%
Republican	Robert Hedlund	41,652	51	
Democratic	James M. Cantwell	38,556	48	

=== Massachusetts General Court, 4th Plymouth District ===
2008 Massachusetts General Court 4th Plymouth District Democratic primary election
Party	Candidate	Votes	%	±%
Democratic	James M. Cantwell	3,600	60	
Democratic	Michael A. Maresco	967	16	
Democratic	James Mf Gilmore	797	13	
Democratic	Stephen A. Lynch	659	11	

2008 Massachusetts General Court 4th Plymouth District election
Party	Candidate	Votes	%	±%
Democratic	James M. Cantwell	13,988	62	
Independent	John Valianti	8,673	38	

2010 Massachusetts General Court 4th Plymouth District election
Party	Candidate	Votes	%	±%
Democratic	James M. Cantwell	14,425	74	

2012 Massachusetts General Court 4th Plymouth District election
Party	Candidate	Votes	%	±%
Democratic	James M. Cantwell	16,128	68	
Republican	Stephen Coulter	7,450	31	

2014 Massachusetts General Court 4th Plymouth District election
Party	Candidate	Votes	%	±%
Democratic	James M. Cantwell	10,560	59	
Republican	James Pavlik	7,444	41	

2016 Massachusetts General Court 4th Plymouth District election
Party	Candidate	Votes	%	±%
Democratic	James M. Cantwell	17,388	70	
Republican	Michael White	7,601	30	
