= John J. Mahoney =

American politician (born 1964)

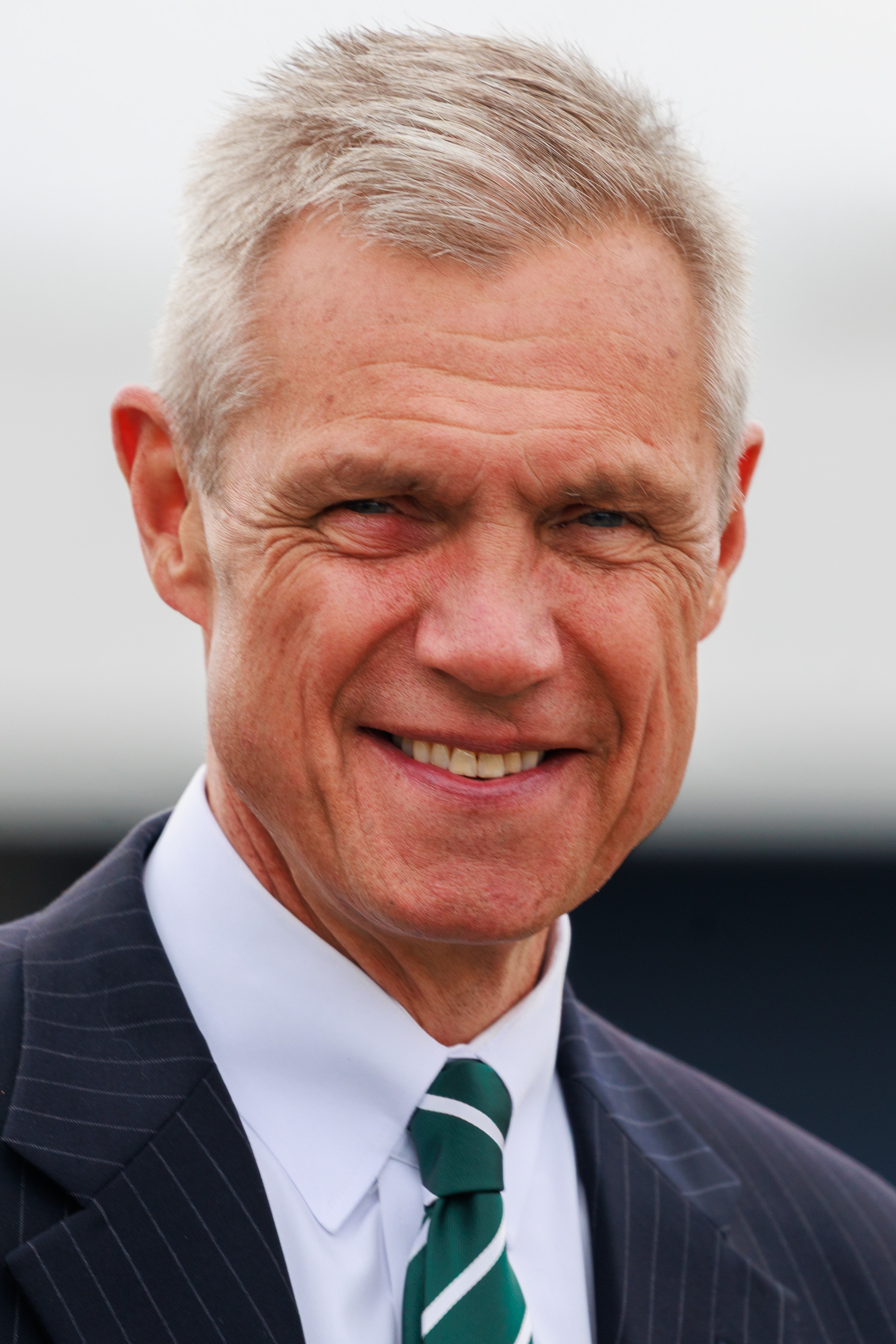

Member of the Massachusetts House of Representatives from the 3rd Norfolk district
- Incumbent
- Assumed office January, 2011
- Preceded by: Robert Spellane

Personal details
- Born: November 5, 1964 (age 61) Worcester, Massachusetts
- Party: Democratic
- Spouse: Erin Mahoney
- Children: 2
- Education: Bryant College
- Occupation: Business Owner; Politician

John J. Mahoney (born November 5, 1964) is an American politician who has represented the 13th Worcester District in the Massachusetts House of Representatives since 2011.

In the 194th General Court of the Commonwealth of Massachusetts, he is serving as Chairperson, House Committee on Post Audit and Oversight.

He has not had a Democratic opponent in the Massachusetts primary since his initial race in 2010 (from 2012-2026). He has only had one opponent in the general election over the same time period and that was in 2014.

== See also ==
- 2019–2020 Massachusetts legislature
- 2021–2022 Massachusetts legislature
