= Frank Hynes =

American politician

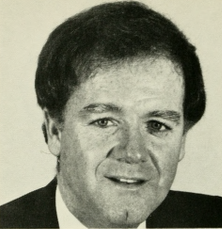
Hynes ca. 1995

Frank M. Hynes is an American politician.

Hynes was first elected to the Massachusetts House of Representatives in a 1983 special election to replace Philip W. Johnston as the legislator from the 4th Plymouth district. Hynes won twelve consecutive terms in his own right, remaining in office until January 2009.
