= Robert L. Rice =

American businessman (1929–2007)

- Born: August 15, 1929; Farmington, Utah, U.S.
- Died: August 30, 2007 (aged 78); Salt Lake City, Utah, U.S.
- Occupation: Businessman

Robert LeGrande "Bob" Rice (August 15, 1929 – August 30, 2007) was an American health club pioneer and philanthropist. Rice-Eccles Stadium at the University of Utah, location of the opening and closing ceremonies of the 2002 Winter Olympics, bears his name. Rice donated $1 million in 1972 to renovate the stadium, then known as Ute Stadium; the Eccles name was added to the stadium in 1998.

A former bodybuilder, Rice started a gym in Salt Lake City in 1952, eventually growing into Health Industries, known as European Health Spas Inc., with nearly 200 locations and more than a half-million members by the 1970s. At the time, it was the largest health club chain in the world and the first of its kind in the United States. He sold the company in 1974 but later became chairman, president, and chief executive officer of Spa Fitness Centers Inc. Rice played a key role in lobbying for legislation in 1981 to prevent deceitful practices by gyms.

Rice was appointed to President Richard Nixon's Council of Physical Fitness in 1972 and served for four years.

Rice (chairman of the board), along with Howard Newson (president) and George Stevens (vice president of finance), in the mid-1980s, took Spa Lady USA and Spa Lady Corporation public. Both corporations owned and operated health facilities on the East Coast. David Gladstone of Allied Capital Corporation was instrumental in providing the venture capital funds needed for the joint company's planned expansion.

In November 2006, Rice was inducted into the David Eccles School of Business Hall of Fame at the University of Utah.
