= Rosemary Sandlin =

American politician (born 1946)

Member of the Massachusetts House of Representatives from the 3rd Hampden district
- In office 2007–2011
- Preceded by: Daniel F. Keenan
- Succeeded by: Nicholas Boldyga

Personal details
- Born: May 31, 1946 (age 80) Springfield, Massachusetts
- Party: Democratic
- Education: University of Massachusetts Without Walls
- Occupation: Office Manager; Politician

Rosemary Sandlin (born May 31, 1946, in Springfield, Massachusetts) is an American politician who represented the Third Hampden District in the Massachusetts House of Representatives from 2007 to 2011 and spent 22 years as a member of the Agawam, Massachusetts School Committee.
