= Robert Nyman =

American politician

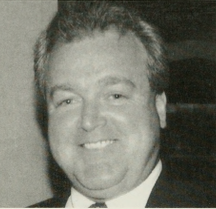
Portrait of Robert Nyman

Robert J. Nyman (August 20, 1960 – June 25, 2010) was an American Democratic politician and member of the Massachusetts House of Representatives from 1999 until his death.

Nyman was found dead in his pool. The Plymouth district attorney's office ruled the death an accidental drowning. Nyman represented the Fifth Plymouth District, which consists of Norwell, Rockland, and his hometown of Hanover. He left a wife and two children.

In an election to succeed Nyman, his wife Rhonda did not have a primary opponent and defeated her Republican opponent in the general election.
