= Denis Guyer =

American politician

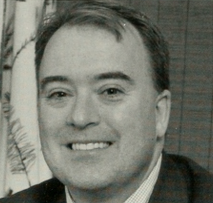
- Portrait of Denis Guyer

Member of the Massachusetts House of Representatives from the 2nd Berkshire district
- In office January 5, 2005 – January 5, 2011
- Preceded by: Shaun P. Kelly
- Succeeded by: Paul Mark

Personal details
- Born: July 11, 1966 (age 60) Pittsfield, Massachusetts
- Party: Democratic
- Spouse: Melissa Guyer
- Education: Massachusetts College of Liberal Arts
- Occupation: Politician

Denis E. Guyer (born July 11, 1966 in Pittsfield, Massachusetts) is an American politician who represented the 2nd Berkshire District in the Massachusetts House of Representatives from 2005–2011. He had previously served as a member of the Board of Selectmen in Dalton, Massachusetts from 2001–2004. He served as Vice Chairman of the Joint Committee on the Environment, Natural Resources and Agriculture from 2009-2011, At the time he served, the Second Berkshire District was geographically the largest House District in the Massachusetts Legislature, consisting of twenty towns and precinct B in Ward One of the City of Pittsfield.
