= Jennifer Callahan =

American politician

Oxford, Massachusetts Town Manager
- Incumbent
- Assumed office 2018

Member of the Massachusetts House of Representatives from the 18th Worcester district
- In office 2003–2011
- Preceded by: District created
- Succeeded by: Ryan Fattman

Personal details
- Born: August 24, 1964 (age 62) Sutton, Massachusetts
- Party: Democratic
- Education: Boston University; University of Massachusetts Amherst
- Occupation: Registered nurse Assistant professor State legislator Town administrator Town manager

Jennifer M. Callahan is an American government official who currently serves as town manager of Oxford, Massachusetts.

== Early life ==
Callahan was born on August 24, 1964, in Sutton, Massachusetts. She attended public school is Sutton and Notre Dame Academy, a private, all-girls Roman Catholic high school in Worcester, Massachusetts. Callahan earned a B.S. and B.A. at Boston University and a Masters of Public Health and a Doctorate in High Education Policy Research and Administration from the University of Massachusetts Amherst. Prior to becoming a state legislator, Callahan worked as a registered nurse.

== Government career ==
Callahan served on Sutton's long range planning committee, school committee, and board of selectmen. From 2003 to 2011 she represented the 18th Worcester district in the Massachusetts House of Representatives. While serving in the House, Callahan was also an assistant professor in the graduate school of nursing at the University of Massachusetts Medical School. In June 2016, Callahan was appointed by the Millville, Massachusetts board of selectmen to serve as the community's first town administrator. In 2018, Callahan was appointed by the Oxford board of selectmen to serve as that community's town manager. In 2022 she was chosen to serve as town administrator in Bourne, Massachusetts, but unexpectedly withdrew from the job a month after being selected.
