= Robert Spellane =

American politician (born 1970)

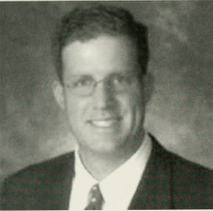
- Portrait of Robert Spellane

Member of the Massachusetts House of Representatives from the 13th Worcester District
- In office 2001–2011
- Preceded by: Harriette L. Chandler
- Succeeded by: John J. Mahoney

Personal details
- Born: March 5, 1970 (age 56) Worcester, Massachusetts
- Party: Democratic
- Education: Roanoke College
- Occupation: Politician

Robert P. Spellane (born March 5, 1970, in Worcester, Massachusetts) is an American politician who represented the 13th Worcester District in the Massachusetts House of Representatives from 2001 to 2011.
