= Paul Frost =

American state legislator

Paul K. Frost
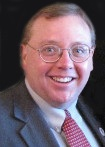

Member of the Massachusetts House of Representatives
- Incumbent
- Assumed office 1997

Personal details
- Born: 1970 (age 55–56)
- Party: Republican
- Education: University of Massachusetts
- Occupation: Legislator

Paul K. Frost (born 1970) is an American state legislator in the Massachusetts House of Representatives. He is an Auburn resident and a member of the Republican Party. He was first elected in 1996 at the age of 26 years. He represents the 7th Worcester District which comprises the Towns of Auburn, Millbury, Oxford (precincts 2&3), and Charlton (precinct 4).

== See also ==
- 2019–2020 Massachusetts legislature
- 2021–2022 Massachusetts legislature
