= Vincent Pedone =

American politician

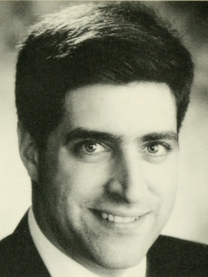
- Portrait of Vincent Pedone

Member of the Massachusetts House of Representatives
- In office 1993–2012

Personal details
- Born: March 15, 1967 (age 59) Worcester, Massachusetts

Vincent Pedone is a former American state legislator who served in the Massachusetts House of Representatives from 1993 to 2012. He served in the United States Army, 1/327 Infantry, from 1985 to 1987. He is Executive Officer of the Massachusetts State University Council of Presidents. He is a Worcester resident and a member of the Democratic Party. He also serves as Chairman of the Worcester Redevelopment Authority.
