= 2020 Massachusetts Senate election =

- November 3, 2020

All 40 seats in the Massachusetts Senate 21 seats needed for a majority
- Registered: 4,812,909 (▲5.20 pp)
- Turnout: 76.00% (▲15.84 pp)
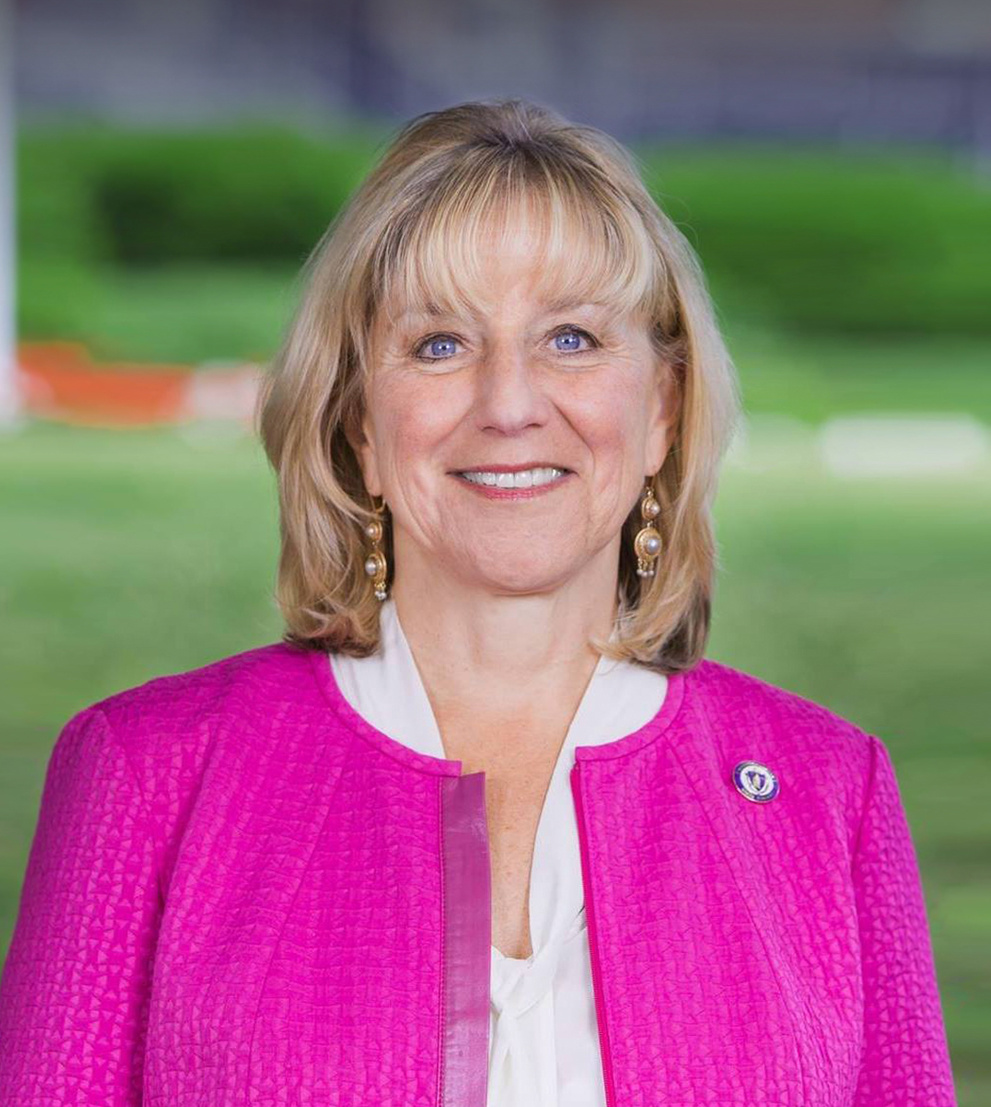

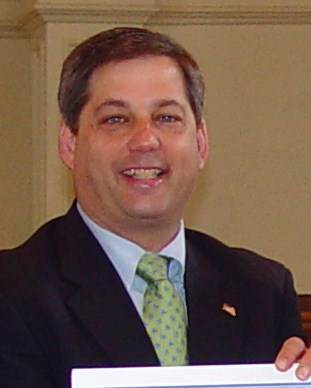
	Majority party	Minority party
Leader	Karen Spilka	Bruce Tarr
Party	Democratic	Republican
Leader since	February 28, 2018	January 3, 2011
Leader's seat	2nd Middlesex and Norfolk	1st Essex and Middlesex
Last election	34 seats	6 seats
Seats before	36	4
Seats won	37	3
Seat change	▲3	▼3
Popular vote	2,407,534	200,099
Percentage	90.25%	7.50%
- Results of the elections: Democratic gain Democratic hold Republican hold
President before election
Karen Spilka
Democratic
Elected President
Karen Spilka
Democratic

The 2020 Massachusetts Senate election was held on November 3, 2020 to elect all 40 members of the Massachusetts Senate. Primary elections were held on September 1, 2020. Voters in Massachusetts elected all 40 members of the State Senate to serve two-year terms in the Massachusetts General Court. The election coincided with United States national elections and Massachusetts state elections, including U.S. Senate, U.S. House, U.S. President, and Massachusetts House.

Democrats started the 2019 legislative session with 34 seats. However, after two Republican senators resigned to take other roles, special elections were held in which Democrats flipped both seats, bringing the Democratic caucus to 36 members and leaving Republicans with just 4 senators.

Democrats flipped a third seat on election day with Democrat John Cronin defeating incumbent Republican Dean Tran. Republicans held only 3 seats after the elections.

== Pre-election special elections ==
=== 2020: 2nd Hampden and Hampshire ===
A special election in the 2nd Hampden and Hampshire district was called after Republican senator Don Humason was elected mayor of Westfield. The election was won by Democratic state representative John Velis, flipping the seat for the Democratic Party.

==== Republican primary ====
===== Candidates =====
====== Nominee ======
- John Cain, business owner

===== Results =====
Republican primary results
Party	Candidate	Votes	%
Republican	John Cain	5,586	98.17%
Write-in		104	1.83%
Total votes		5,690	100.00%

==== Democratic primary ====
===== Candidates =====
====== Nominees ======
- John Velis, state representative

===== Results =====
Democratic primary results
Party	Candidate	Votes	%
Democratic	John Velis	20,848	99.14%
Write-in		181	0.49%
Total votes		21,029	100.00%

==== General election ====
===== Results =====
General election results
Party	Candidate	Votes	%
Democratic	John Velis	10,089	64.18%
Republican	John Cain	5,620	35.75%
Write-in		10	0.06%
Total votes		15,719	100.00%
Democratic gain from Republican			

=== 2020: Plymouth and Barnstable ===
A special election in the Plymouth and Barnstable district was called after Republican senator Vinny deMacedo resigned to take an academic position. The election was won by Democrat Susan Moran, flipping the seat for the Democratic Party.

==== Republican primary ====
===== Candidates =====
====== Nominee ======
- James McMahon, attorney and candidate for attorney general in 2018

====== Eliminated in primary ======
- Jesse Brown, business owner

===== Results =====
Republican primary results
Party	Candidate	Votes	%
Republican	James McMahon	8,288	55.92%
Republican	Jesse Brown	6,495	43.83%
Write-in		37	0.25%
Total votes		14,820	100.00%

==== Democratic primary ====
===== Candidates =====
====== Nominee ======
- Susan Moran, attorney and member of the Falmouth Select Board

====== Eliminated in primary ======
- Becky Coletta, attorney and member of the Pembroke Planning Board
- John Mahoney, member of the Plymouth Select Board and candidate for the 1st Plymouth district of the state house in 2016 and 2018
- Thomas Moakley, progressive activist
- Stephen Michael Palmer, hotel worker and candidate for this district in 2018 and for the 1st Suffolk district in 1990

===== Results =====
Democratic primary results
Party	Candidate	Votes	%
Democratic	Susan Moran	8,894	26.83%
Democratic	John Maloney	8,636	26.05%
Democratic	Thomas Moakley	6,806	20.53%
Democratic	Becky Coletta	6,701	20.21%
Democratic	Stephen Michael Palmer	1,936	5.84%
Write-in		181	0.55%
Total votes		33,154	100.00%

==== General election ====
===== Results =====
General election results
Party	Candidate	Votes	%
Democratic	Susan Moran	11,587	56.16%
Republican	James McMahon	9,010	43.67%
Write-in		35	0.17%
Total votes		20,632	100.00%
Democratic gain from Republican			

== Predictions ==
Source	Ranking	As of
The Cook Political Report	Safe D	October 21, 2020

== Overview ==
=== Election ===
2020 Massachusetts Senate election General election — November 3, 2020
Party	Votes	Percentage	Seats	+/–
Democratic	2,407,534	90.25	37	▲1
Republican	200,099	7.50	3	▼1
Independents	23,469	0.88	0	Steady
All Others	36,410	1.36	0	Steady
Valid votes	2,667,512	78.44	—	—
Invalid votes	733,124	21.56	—	—
Totals	3,400,636	100.00	40	—
Registered voter/turnout	4,812,909	70.66		

Popular vote
Democratic	90.25%
Republican	7.50%
Independent	0.88%
Other	1.36%

Percentage seats won
Democratic	92.50%
Republican	7.50%

=== Closest races ===
Seats where the margin of victory was under 10%:

1. Worcester and Middlesex District, 1.9%
2. Worcester, Hampden, Hampshire and Middlesex District, 5.7%

== Summary of results by Senate district ==
Italics denote an open seat held by the incumbent party or a seat where the incumbent was defeated by a primary challenger; bold text denotes a gain for a party.

Senate District	Incumbent	Party	Elected Senator	Party
Berkshire, Hampshire, Franklin and Hampden	Adam Hinds	Dem	Adam Hinds	Dem
Bristol and Norfolk	Paul Feeney	Dem	Paul Feeney	Dem
1st Bristol and Plymouth	Michael Rodrigues	Dem	Michael Rodrigues	Dem
2nd Bristol and Plymouth	Mark Montigny	Dem	Mark Montigny	Dem
Cape and Islands	Julian Cyr	Dem	Julian Cyr	Dem
1st Essex	Diana DiZoglio	Dem	Diana DiZoglio	Dem
2nd Essex	Joan Lovely	Dem	Joan Lovely	Dem
3rd Essex	Brendan Crighton	Dem	Brendan Crighton	Dem
1st Essex and Middlesex	Bruce Tarr	Rep	Bruce Tarr	Rep
2nd Essex and Middlesex	Barry Finegold	Dem	Barry Finegold	Dem
Hampden	James T. Welch	Dem	Adam Gomez	Dem
1st Hampden and Hampshire	Eric Lesser	Dem	Eric Lesser	Dem
2nd Hampden and Hampshire	John Velis	Dem	John Velis	Dem
Hampshire, Franklin and Worcester	Jo Comerford	Dem	Jo Comerford	Dem
1st Middlesex	Edward J. Kennedy	Dem	Edward J. Kennedy	Dem
2nd Middlesex	Patricia D. Jehlen	Dem	Patricia D. Jehlen	Dem
3rd Middlesex	Michael J. Barrett	Dem	Michael J. Barrett	Dem
4th Middlesex	Cindy Friedman	Dem	Cindy Friedman	Dem
5th Middlesex	Jason Lewis	Dem	Jason Lewis	Dem
1st Middlesex and Norfolk	Cynthia Stone Creem	Dem	Cynthia Stone Creem	Dem
2nd Middlesex and Norfolk	Karen Spilka	Dem	Karen Spilka	Dem
Middlesex and Worcester	Jamie Eldridge	Dem	Jamie Eldridge	Dem
Middlesex and Suffolk	Sal DiDomenico	Dem	Sal DiDomenico	Dem
Norfolk, Bristol and Middlesex	Becca Rausch	Dem	Becca Rausch	Dem
Norfolk, Bristol and Plymouth	Walter Timilty	Dem	Walter Timilty	Dem
Norfolk and Plymouth	John Keenan	Dem	John Keenan	Dem
Norfolk and Suffolk	Mike Rush	Dem	Mike Rush	Dem
Plymouth and Barnstable	Susan Moran	Dem	Susan Moran	Dem
Plymouth and Norfolk	Patrick O'Connor	Rep	Patrick O'Connor	Rep
1st Plymouth and Bristol	Marc Pacheco	Dem	Marc Pacheco	Dem
2nd Plymouth and Norfolk	Michael Brady	Dem	Michael Brady	Dem
1st Suffolk	Nick Collins	Dem	Nick Collins	Dem
2nd Suffolk	Sonia Chang-Díaz	Dem	Sonia Chang-Díaz	Dem
1st Suffolk and Middlesex	Joseph Boncore	Dem	Joseph Boncore	Dem
2nd Suffolk and Middlesex	Will Brownsberger	Dem	Will Brownsberger	Dem
Worcester and Middlesex	Dean Tran	Rep	**John J. Cronin**	**Dem**
Worcester and Norfolk	Ryan Fattman	Rep	Ryan Fattman	Rep
Worcester, Hampden, Hampshire and Middlesex	Anne Gobi	Dem	Anne Gobi	Dem
1st Worcester	Harriette L. Chandler	Dem	Harriette L. Chandler	Dem
2nd Worcester	Michael O. Moore	Dem	Michael O. Moore	Dem

== Detailed Results ==
=== Berkshire, Hampshire, Franklin and Hampden ===
Democratic primary results
Party	Candidate	Votes	%
Democratic	Adam Hinds (incumbent)	34,425	99.77%
Write-in		79	0.23%
Total votes		34,504	100.00%

General election results
Party	Candidate	Votes	%
Democratic	Adam Hinds (incumbent)	68,973	99.40%
Write-in		419	0.60%
Total votes		69,392	100.00%
Democratic hold			

=== Bristol and Norfolk ===
Primary election results
Party	Candidate	Votes	%
Democratic primary results
Democratic	Paul Feeney (incumbent)	25,990	99.61%
Write-in		103	0.39%
Total votes		26,093	100.00%
Republican primary results
Republican	Harry Brousaides (write-in)	43	7.04%
Write-in	Others	568	92.96%
Total votes		611	100.00%

General election results
Party	Candidate	Votes	%
Democratic	Paul Feeney (incumbent)	68,917	98.55%
Write-in		1,016	1.45%
Total votes		69,933	100.00%
Democratic hold			

=== 1st Bristol and Plymouth ===
Democratic primary results
Party	Candidate	Votes	%
Democratic	Michael Rodrigues (incumbent)	19,064	99.69%
Write-in		59	0.31%
Total votes		19,123	100.00%

General election results
Party	Candidate	Votes	%
Democratic	Michael Rodrigues (incumbent)	57,205	98.63%
Write-in		792	1.37%
Total votes		57,997	100.0%
Democratic hold			

=== 2nd Bristol and Plymouth ===
Democratic primary results
Party	Candidate	Votes	%
Democratic	Mark Montigny (incumbent)	20,066	99.43%
Write-in		116	0.57%
Total votes		20,182	100.00%

General election results
Party	Candidate	Votes	%
Democratic	Mark Montigny (incumbent)	55,159	98.13%
Write-in		1,050	1.87%
Total votes		56,209	100.00%
Democratic hold			

=== Cape and Islands ===
Democratic primary results
Party	Candidate	Votes	%
Democratic	Julian Cyr (incumbent)	40,021	99.48%
Write-in		208	0.52%
Total votes		40,229	100.00%

General election results
Party	Candidate	Votes	%
Democratic	Julian Cyr (incumbent)	89,721	98.55%
Write-in	Leah Christine Mercurio	235	0.26%
Write-in	Others	1,082	1.15%
Total votes		91,038	100.00%
Democratic hold			

=== 1st Essex ===
Democratic primary results
Party	Candidate	Votes	%
Democratic	Diana DiZoglio (incumbent)	27,963	99.55%
Write-in		127	0.45%
Total votes		28,090	100.00%

General election results
Party	Candidate	Votes	%
Democratic	Diana DiZoglio (incumbent)	72,722	97.82%
Write-in		1,617	2.18%
Total votes		74,339	100.00%
Democratic hold			

=== 2nd Essex ===
Democratic primary results
Party	Candidate	Votes	%
Democratic	Joan Lovely (incumbent)	32,475	99.58%
Write-in		137	0.42%
Total votes		32,612	100.00%

General election results
Party	Candidate	Votes	%
Democratic	Joan Lovely (incumbent)	75,182	98.74%
Write-in		958	1.26%
Total votes		76,140	100.00%
Democratic hold			

=== 3rd Essex ===
Primary election results
Party	Candidate	Votes	%
Democratic primary results
Democratic	Brendan Crighton (incumbent)	25,226	99.33%
Write-in		169	0.67%
Total votes		25,395	100.00%
Republican primary results
Republican	Carlos Armando Hernandez (write-in)	174	20.05%
Write-in	Others	694	79.95%
Total votes		868	100.00%

General election results
Party	Candidate	Votes	%
Democratic	Brendan Crighton (incumbent)	62,381	97.03%
Write-in		1,912	2.97%
Total votes		64,293	100.00%
Democratic hold			

=== 1st Essex and Middlesex ===
Republican primary results
Party	Candidate	Votes	%
Republican	Bruce Tarr (incumbent)	10,126	99.32%
Write-in		69	0.68%
Total votes		10,195	100.00%

General election results
Party	Candidate	Votes	%
Republican	Bruce Tarr (incumbent)	86,565	98.55%
Write-in		1,273	1.45%
Total votes		87,838	100.00%
Republican hold			

=== 2nd Essex and Middlesex ===
Democratic primary results
Party	Candidate	Votes	%
Democratic	Barry Finegold (incumbent)	22,269	98.90%
Write-in		248	1.10%
Total votes		22,517	100.00%

General election results
Party	Candidate	Votes	%
Democratic	Barry Finegold (incumbent)	60,176	97.74%
Write-in		1,390	2.26%
Total votes		61,566	100.00%
Democratic hold			

=== Hampden ===
Democratic primary results
Party	Candidate	Votes	%
Democratic	Adam Gomez	11,522	52.43%
Democratic	James T. Welch (incumbent)	10,397	47.31%
Write-in		59	0.27%
Total votes		21,978	100.00%

General election results
Party	Candidate	Votes	%
Democratic	Adam Gomez	44,038	97.45%
Write-in		1,151	2.55%
Total votes		45,189	100.00%
Democratic hold			

=== 1st Hampden and Hampshire ===
Democratic primary results
Party	Candidate	Votes	%
Democratic	Eric Lesser (incumbent)	30,186	99.17%
Write-in		253	0.83%
Total votes		30,439	100.00%

General election results
Party	Candidate	Votes	%
Democratic	Eric Lesser (incumbent)	66,944	96.95%
Write-in		2,105	3.05%
Total votes		69,049	100.00%
Democratic hold			

=== 2nd Hampden and Hampshire ===
Primary election results
Party	Candidate	Votes	%
Republican primary results
Republican	John Cain	7,523	99.09%
Write-in		69	0.91%
Total votes		7,592	100.00%
Democratic primary results
Democratic	John Velis (incumbent)	26,196	99.62%
Write-in		99	0.38%
Total votes		26,295	100.00%

General election results
Party	Candidate	Votes	%
Democratic	John Velis (incumbent)	50,100	63.94%
Republican	John Cain	28,078	35.83%
Write-in		177	0.23%
Total votes		78,355	100.00%
Democratic hold			

=== Hampshire, Franklin and Worcester ===
Democratic primary results
Party	Candidate	Votes	%
Democratic	Jo Comerford (incumbent)	37,329	99.69%
Write-in		116	0.31%
Total votes		37,445	100.00%

General election results
Party	Candidate	Votes	%
Democratic	Jo Comerford (incumbent)	68,001	99.11%
Write-in		610	0.89%
Total votes		68,611	100.00%
Democratic hold			

=== 1st Middlesex ===
Democratic primary results
Party	Candidate	Votes	%
Democratic	Edward J. Kennedy (incumbent)	21,890	99.20%
Write-in		177	0.80%
Total votes		22,067	100.00%

General election results
Party	Candidate	Votes	%
Democratic	Edward J. Kennedy (incumbent)	56,791	98.77%
Write-in		706	1.23%
Total votes		57,497	100.00%
Democratic hold			

=== 2nd Middlesex ===
Democratic primary results
Party	Candidate	Votes	%
Democratic	Patricia D. Jehlen (incumbent)	41,723	81.73%
Democratic	Gary Fisher	9,231	18.08%
Write-in		98	0.19%
Total votes		51,052	100.00%

General election results
Party	Candidate	Votes	%
Democratic	Patricia D. Jehlen (incumbent)	82,607	98.81%
Write-in		991	1.19%
Total votes		83,598	100.00%
Democratic hold			

=== 3rd Middlesex ===
Democratic primary results
Party	Candidate	Votes	%
Democratic	Michael J. Barrett (incumbent)	36,536	99.63%
Write-in		137	0.37%
Total votes		36,673	100.00%

General election results
Party	Candidate	Votes	%
Democratic	Michael J. Barrett (incumbent)	74,850	98.69%
Write-in		990	1.31%
Total votes		75,840	100.00%
Democratic hold			

=== 4th Middlesex ===
Democratic primary results
Party	Candidate	Votes	%
Democratic	Cindy Friedman (incumbent)	37,189	99.51%
Write-in		184	0.49%
Total votes		37,373	100.00%

General election results
Party	Candidate	Votes	%
Democratic	Cindy Friedman (incumbent)	74,955	98.35%
Write-in		1,255	1.65%
Total votes		76,210	100.00%
Democratic hold			

=== 5th Middlesex ===
Primary election results
Party	Candidate	Votes	%
Democratic primary results
Democratic	Jason Lewis (incumbent)	34,865	99.21%
Write-in		276	0.79%
Total votes		35,141	100.00%
Republican primary results
Republican	Daniel Ensminger (write-in)	167	20.14%
Write-in	Others	662	79.86%
Total votes		829	100.00%

General election results
Party	Candidate	Votes	%
Democratic	Jason Lewis (incumbent)	68,055	98.05%
Write-in		1,355	1.95%
Total votes		69,410	100.00%
Democratic hold			

=== 1st Middlesex and Norfolk ===
Democratic primary results
Party	Candidate	Votes	%
Democratic	Cynthia Stone Creem (incumbent)	40,406	99.34%
Write-in		268	0.66%
Total votes		40,674	100.00%

General election results
Party	Candidate	Votes	%
Democratic	Cynthia Stone Creem (incumbent)	70,430	98.90%
Write-in		786	1.10%
Total votes		71,216	100.00%
Democratic hold			

=== 2nd Middlesex and Norfolk ===
Democratic primary results
Party	Candidate	Votes	%
Democratic	Karen Spilka (incumbent)	32,510	99.64%
Write-in		119	0.36%
Total votes		32,629	100.00%

General election results
Party	Candidate	Votes	%
Democratic	Karen Spilka (incumbent)	70,660	98.54%
Write-in		1,050	1.46%
Total votes		71,710	100.00%
Democratic hold			

=== Middlesex and Worcester ===
Democratic primary results
Party	Candidate	Votes	%
Democratic	Jamie Eldridge (incumbent)	35,949	99.67%
Write-in		120	0.33%
Total votes		36,069	100.00%

General election results
Party	Candidate	Votes	%
Democratic	Jamie Eldridge (incumbent)	77,958	98.38%
Write-in		1,282	1.62%
Total votes		79,240	100.00%
Democratic hold			

=== Middlesex and Suffolk ===
Democratic primary results
Party	Candidate	Votes	%
Democratic	Sal DiDomenico (incumbent)	27,790	99.27%
Write-in		203	0.73%
Total votes		27,993	100.00%

General election results
Party	Candidate	Votes	%
Democratic	Sal DiDomenico (incumbent)	59,047	98.88%
Write-in		669	1.12%
Total votes		59,716	100.00%
Democratic hold			

=== Norfolk, Bristol and Middlesex ===
Primary election results
Party	Candidate	Votes	%
Democratic primary results
Democratic	Becca Rausch (incumbent)	29,997	99.44%
Write-in		169	0.56%
Total votes		30,166	100.00%
Republican primary results
Republican	Matthew Kelly	7,093	99.44%
Write-in		40	0.56%
Total votes		7,133	100.00%

General election results
Party	Candidate	Votes	%
Democratic	Becca Rausch (incumbent)	58,320	59.70%
Republican	Matthew Kelly	39,290	40.22%
Write-in		80	0.08%
Total votes		97,690	100.00%
Democratic hold			

=== Norfolk, Bristol and Plymouth ===
Democratic primary results
Party	Candidate	Votes	%
Democratic	Walter Timilty (incumbent)	25,222	68.01%
Democratic	Jared Rose	11,819	31.87%
Write-in		46	0.12%
Total votes		37,087	100.00%

General election results
Party	Candidate	Votes	%
Democratic	Walter Timilty (incumbent)	71,530	99.02%
Write-in		707	0.98%
Total votes		72,237	100.00%
Democratic hold			

=== Norfolk and Plymouth ===
Democratic primary results
Party	Candidate	Votes	%
Democratic	John Keenan (incumbent)	27,139	98.82%
Write-in		323	1.18%
Total votes		27,462	100.00%

General election results
Party	Candidate	Votes	%
Democratic	John Keenan (incumbent)	53,385	69.24%
Independent	Alexander Mendez	23,469	30.44%
Write-in		246	0.32%
Total votes		77,100	100.00%
Democratic hold			

=== Norfolk and Suffolk ===
Democratic primary results
Party	Candidate	Votes	%
Democratic	Mike Rush (incumbent)	33,952	98.88%
Write-in		385	1.12%
Total votes		34,337	100.00%

General election results
Party	Candidate	Votes	%
Democratic	Mike Rush (incumbent)	71,595	98.47%
Write-in		1,113	1.53%
Total votes		72,708	100.00%
Democratic hold			

=== Plymouth and Barnstable ===
Primary election results
Party	Candidate	Votes	%
Democratic primary results
Democratic	Susan Moran (incumbent)	28,989	99.45%
Write-in		159	0.55%
Total votes		29,148	100.00%
Republican primary results
Republican	James McMahon	11,284	99.38%
Write-in		70	0.62%
Total votes		11,354	100.00%

General election results
Party	Candidate	Votes	%
Democratic	Susan Moran (incumbent)	56,962	56.27%
Republican	James McMahon	44,201	43.66%
Write-in		70	0.07%
Total votes		101,233	100.00%
Democratic hold			

=== Plymouth and Norfolk ===
Primary election results
Party	Candidate	Votes	%
Republican primary results
Republican	Patrick O'Connor (incumbent)	9,484	99.42%
Write-in		55	0.58%
Total votes		9,539	100.00%
Democratic primary results
Democratic	Meg Wheeler	32,471	99.08%
Write-in		303	0.92%
Total votes		32,774	100.00%

General election results
Party	Candidate	Votes	%
Republican	Patrick O'Connor (incumbent)	58,965	54.97%
Democratic	Meg Wheeler	48,236	44.96%
Write-in		71	0.07%
Total votes		107,275	100.00%
Republican hold			

=== 1st Plymouth and Bristol ===
Democratic primary results
Party	Candidate	Votes	%
Democratic	Marc Pacheco (incumbent)	21,471	99.34%
Write-in		142	0.66%
Total votes		21,613	100.00%

General election results
Party	Candidate	Votes	%
Democratic	Marc Pacheco (incumbent)	66,680	98.01%
Write-in		1,355	1.99%
Total votes		68,035	100.00%
Democratic hold			

=== 2nd Plymouth and Bristol ===
Democratic primary results
Party	Candidate	Votes	%
Democratic	Michael Brady (incumbent)	14,736	57.15%
Democratic	Moises Rodrigues	11,037	42.80%
Write-in		14	0.05%
Total votes		25,787	100.00%

General election results
Party	Candidate	Votes	%
Democratic	Michael Brady (incumbent)	60,517	99.08%
Write-in		559	0.92%
Total votes		61,076	100.00%
Democratic hold			

=== 1st Suffolk ===
Democratic primary results
Party	Candidate	Votes	%
Democratic	Nick Collins (incumbent)	23,615	73.87%
Democratic	Samuel Pierce	8,219	25.71%
Write-in		135	0.42%
Total votes		31,969	100.00%

General election results
Party	Candidate	Votes	%
Democratic	Nick Collins (incumbent)	67,362	98.27%
Write-in		1,188	1.73%
Total votes		68,550	100.00%
Democratic hold			

=== 2nd Suffolk ===
Democratic primary results
Party	Candidate	Votes	%
Democratic	Sonia Chang-Díaz (incumbent)	33,053	99.16%
Write-in		279	0.84%
Total votes		33,332	100.00%

General election results
Party	Candidate	Votes	%
Democratic	Sonia Chang-Díaz (incumbent)	64,557	98.79%
Write-in		794	1.21%
Total votes		65,351	100.00%
Democratic hold			

=== 1st Suffolk and Middlesex ===
Democratic primary results
Party	Candidate	Votes	%
Democratic	Joseph Boncore (incumbent)	24,370	98.83%
Write-in		289	1.17%
Total votes		24,659	100.00%

General election results
Party	Candidate	Votes	%
Democratic	Joseph Boncore (incumbent)	57,744	97.92%
Write-in		1,228	2.08%
Total votes		58,972	100.00%
Democratic hold			

=== 2nd Suffolk and Middlesex ===
Democratic primary results
Party	Candidate	Votes	%
Democratic	Will Brownsberger (incumbent)	30,358	99.41%
Write-in		181	0.59%
Total votes		30,539	100.00%

General election results
Party	Candidate	Votes	%
Democratic	Will Brownsberger (incumbent)	60,282	98.53%
Write-in		899	1.47%
Total votes		61,171	100.00%
Democratic hold			

=== Worcester and Middlesex ===
Primary election results
Party	Candidate	Votes	%
Republican primary results
Republican	Dean Tran (incumbent)	7,577	99.57%
Write-in		33	0.43%
Total votes		7,610	100.00%
Democratic primary results
Democratic	John J. Cronin	21,485	99.64%
Write-in		77	0.36%
Total votes		21,562	100.00%

General election results
Party	Candidate	Votes	%
Democratic	John J. Cronin	42,188	50.92%
Republican	Dean Tran (incumbent)	40,558	48.95%
Write-in		105	0.13%
Total votes		82,851	100.00%
Democratic gain from Republican			

=== Worcester and Norfolk ===
Primary election results
Party	Candidate	Votes	%
Republican primary results
Republican	Ryan Fattman (incumbent)	8,183	99.53%
Write-in		39	0.47%
Total votes		8,222	100.00%
Democratic primary results
Democratic	Christine Crean (write-in)	684	30.48%
Write-in	Others	1,560	69.52%
Total votes		2,244	100.00%

General election results
Party	Candidate	Votes	%
Republican	Ryan Fattman (incumbent)	54,569	60.43%
Democratic	Christine Crean	35,651	39.48%
Write-in		83	0.09%
Total votes		90,303	100.00%
Republican hold			

=== Worcester, Hampden, Hampshire and Middlesex ===
Primary election results
Party	Candidate	Votes	%
Democratic primary results
Democratic	Anne Gobi (incumbent)	22,458	99.48%
Write-in		118	0.52%
Total votes		22,576	100.00%
Republican primary results
Republican	Steven Hall	8,854	99.38%
Write-in		55	0.62%
Total votes		8,909	100.00%

General election results
Party	Candidate	Votes	%
Democratic	Anne Gobi (incumbent)	48,299	52.77%
Republican	Steven Hall	43,117	47.11%
Write-in		107	0.12%
Total votes		91,523	100.00%
Democratic hold			

=== 1st Worcester ===
Democratic primary results
Party	Candidate	Votes	%
Democratic	Harriette L. Chandler (incumbent)	26,351	99.20%
Write-in		212	0.80%
Total votes		26,563	100.00%

General election results
Party	Candidate	Votes	%
Democratic	Harriette L. Chandler (incumbent)	62,439	97.34%
Write-in		1,704	2.66%
Total votes		64,143	100.00%
Democratic hold			

=== 2nd Worcester ===
Democratic primary results
Party	Candidate	Votes	%
Democratic	Michael O. Moore (incumbent)	25,265	99.57%
Write-in		109	0.43%
Total votes		25,374	100.00%

General election results
Party	Candidate	Votes	%
Democratic	Michael O. Moore (incumbent)	69,126	98.31%
Write-in		1,185	1.69%
Total votes		70,311	100.00%
Democratic hold			

== See also ==
- 2020 Massachusetts general election
- 2020 Massachusetts House of Representatives election
- 2019–2020 Massachusetts legislature
- 2021–2022 Massachusetts legislature
