= 2016 Massachusetts Senate election =

- November 8, 2016

All 40 seats in the Massachusetts Senate 21 seats needed for a majority
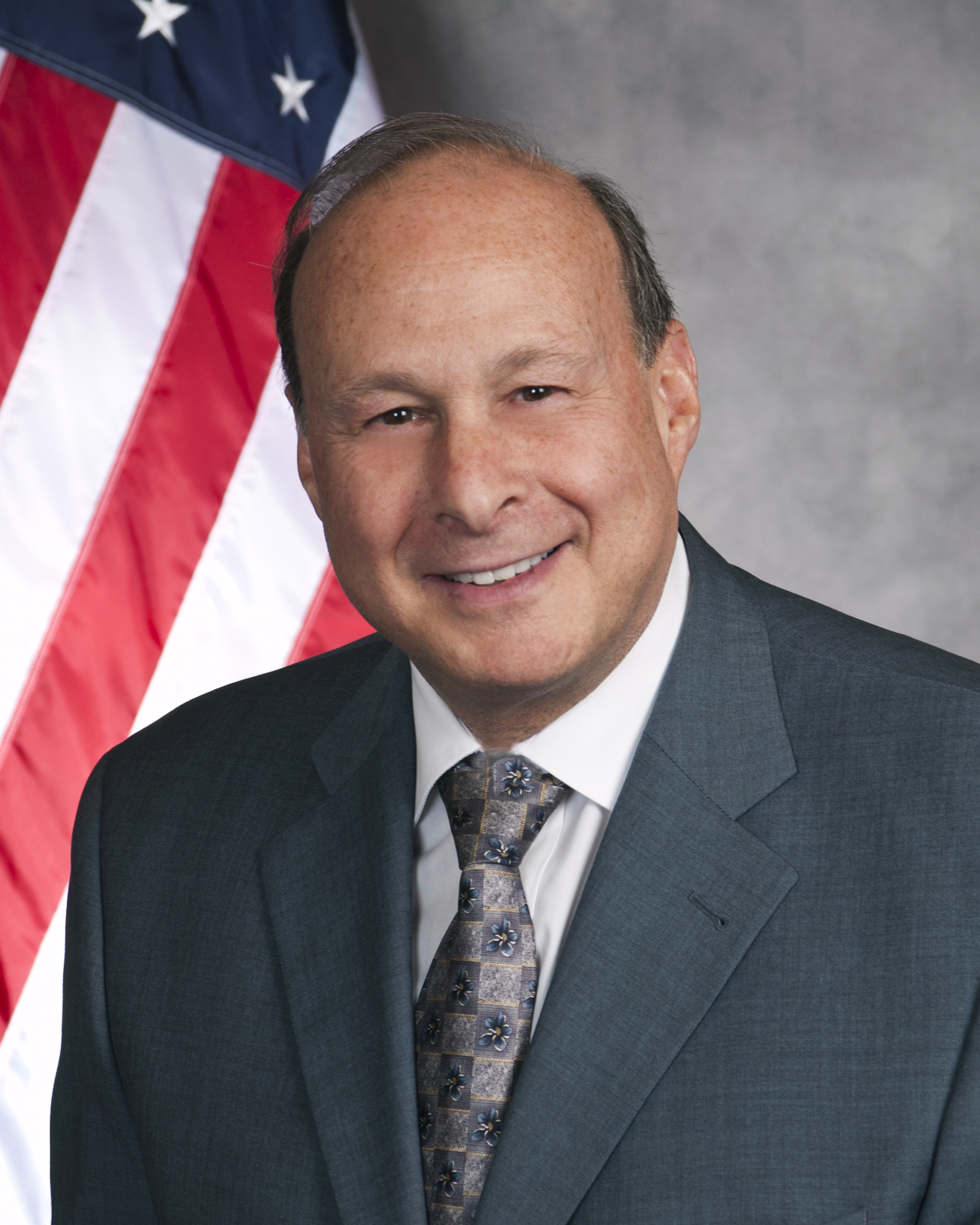

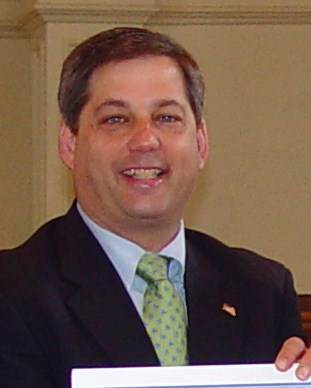
	Majority party	Minority party
Leader	Stan Rosenberg	Bruce Tarr
Party	Democratic	Republican
Leader since	January 8, 2015	January 3, 2011
Leader's seat	Massachusetts Senate's Hampshire, Franklin and Worcester district	1st Essex and Middlesex
Last election	34 seats	6 seats
Seats before	34	6
Seats won	34	6
Seat change	Steady	Steady
Popular vote	2,053,890	635,030
Percentage	74.6%	23.07%
- Results of the elections: Democratic hold Republican hold
President before election
Stan Rosenberg
Democratic
Elected President
Stan Rosenberg
Democratic

The 2016 Massachusetts Senate election took place on November 8, 2016, to elect members of the Massachusetts Senate. Massachusetts voters elected all 40 members of the State Senate to serve two-year terms in the Massachusetts General Court. The election coincided with United States national elections and Massachusetts state elections, including U.S. House, U.S. President, and Massachusetts House.

Democrats retained all 34 of their seats after the election.

== Predictions ==
Source	Ranking	As of
Governing	Safe D	October 12, 2016

== Detailed results ==
District	Party	Incumbent	Status	Party	Candidate	Votes	%
Berkshire, Hampshire and Franklin	Democratic	Benjamin Downing	Retired	Democratic	Adam G. Hinds	53,216	70.11%
Berkshire, Hampshire and Franklin	Democratic	Benjamin Downing	Retired	Republican	Christine M. Canning	22,624	29.81%
Berkshire, Hampshire and Franklin	Democratic	Benjamin Downing	Retired		All Others	62	0.08%
Bristol and Norfolk	Democratic	James E. Timilty	Won	Democratic	James E. Timilty	66,611	99.34%
Bristol and Norfolk	Democratic	James E. Timilty	Won		All Others	445	0.66%
1st Bristol and Plymouth	Democratic	Michael J. Rodrigues	Won	Democratic	Michael J. Rodrigues	54,618	99.35%
1st Bristol and Plymouth	Democratic	Michael J. Rodrigues	Won		All Others	355	0.65%
2nd Bristol and Plymouth	Democratic	Mark C. Montigny	Won	Democratic	Mark C. Montigny	53,882	99.03%
2nd Bristol and Plymouth	Democratic	Mark C. Montigny	Won		All Others	526	0.97%
Cape and Islands	Democratic	Daniel Wolf	Retired	Democratic	Julian Andre Cyr	59,974	56.89%
Cape and Islands	Democratic	Daniel Wolf	Retired	Republican	Anthony E. Schiavi	45,349	43.02%
Cape and Islands	Democratic	Daniel Wolf	Retired		All Others	94	0.09%
1st Essex	Democratic	Kathleen A. O'Connor Ives	Won	Democratic	Kathleen A. O'Connor Ives	65,131	99.05%
1st Essex	Democratic	Kathleen A. O'Connor Ives	Won		All Others	622	0.95%
2nd Essex	Democratic	Joan B. Lovely	Won	Democratic	Joan B. Lovely	67,120	98.86%
2nd Essex	Democratic	Joan B. Lovely	Won		All Others	772	1.14%
3rd Essex	Democratic	Thomas M. McGee	Won	Democratic	Thomas M. McGee	58,844	99.08%
3rd Essex	Democratic	Thomas M. McGee	Won		All Others	545	0.92%
1st Essex and Middlesex	Republican	Bruce E. Tarr	Won	Republican	Bruce E. Tarr	77,851	99.18%
1st Essex and Middlesex	Republican	Bruce E. Tarr	Won		All Others	647	0.82%
2nd Essex and Middlesex	Democratic	Barbara A. L'Italien	Won	Democratic	Barbara A. L'Italien	45,218	63.43%
2nd Essex and Middlesex	Democratic	Barbara A. L'Italien	Won	Republican	Susan M. Laplante	25,973	36.43%
2nd Essex and Middlesex	Democratic	Barbara A. L'Italien	Won		All Others	100	0.14%
Hampden	Democratic	James T. Welch	Won	Democratic	James T. Welch	45,061	98.29%
Hampden	Democratic	James T. Welch	Won		All Others	782	1.71%
1st Hampden and Hampshire	Democratic	Eric P. Lesser	Won	Democratic	Eric P. Lesser	44,602	55.83%
1st Hampden and Hampshire	Democratic	Eric P. Lesser	Won	Republican	James Chip Harrington	35,188	44.05%
1st Hampden and Hampshire	Democratic	Eric P. Lesser	Won		All Others	100	0.13%
2nd Hampden and Hampshire	Republican	Donald F. Humason Jr.	Won	Republican	Donald F. Humason Jr.	43,097	59.49%
2nd Hampden and Hampshire	Republican	Donald F. Humason Jr.	Won	Democratic	Jerome Parker-O'Grady	29,285	40.42%
2nd Hampden and Hampshire	Republican	Donald F. Humason Jr.	Won		All Others	67	0.09%
Hampshire, Franklin and Worcester	Democratic	Stanley C. Rosenberg	Won	Democratic	Stanley C. Rosenberg	62,286	81.63%
Hampshire, Franklin and Worcester	Democratic	Stanley C. Rosenberg	Won	Republican	Donald Peltier	13,908	18.23%
Hampshire, Franklin and Worcester	Democratic	Stanley C. Rosenberg	Won		All Others	105	0.14%
1st Middlesex	Democratic	Eileen M. Donoghue	Won	Democratic	Eileen M. Donoghue	56,759	98.58%
1st Middlesex	Democratic	Eileen M. Donoghue	Won		All Others	819	1.42%
2nd Middlesex	Democratic	Patricia D. Jehlen	Won	Democratic	Patricia D. Jehlen	75,777	98.51%
2nd Middlesex	Democratic	Patricia D. Jehlen	Won		All Others	1,146	1.49%
3rd Middlesex	Democratic	Michael J. Barrett	Won	Democratic	Michael J. Barrett	64,554	98.74%
3rd Middlesex	Democratic	Michael J. Barrett	Won		All Others	822	1.26%
4th Middlesex	Democratic	Kenneth J. Donnelly	Won	Democratic	Kenneth J. Donnelly	68,540	99.02%
4th Middlesex	Democratic	Kenneth J. Donnelly	Won		All Others	675	0.98%
5th Middlesex	Democratic	Jason M. Lewis	Won	Democratic	Jason M. Lewis	52,954	68.89%
5th Middlesex	Democratic	Jason M. Lewis	Won	Republican	Vincent Lawrence Dixon	23,628	30.74%
5th Middlesex	Democratic	Jason M. Lewis	Won		All Others	290	0.38%
1st Middlesex and Norfolk	Democratic	Cynthia Stone Creem	Won	Democratic	Cynthia Stone Creem	62,668	98.98%
1st Middlesex and Norfolk	Democratic	Cynthia Stone Creem	Won		All Others	647	1.02%
2nd Middlesex and Norfolk	Democratic	Karen E. Spilka	Won	Democratic	Karen E. Spilka	61,230	98.48%
2nd Middlesex and Norfolk	Democratic	Karen E. Spilka	Won		All Others	947	1.52%
Middlesex and Worcester	Democratic	James B. Eldridge	Won	Democratic	James B. Eldridge	55,698	64.23%
Middlesex and Worcester	Democratic	James B. Eldridge	Won	Republican	Ted Busiek	26,865	30.98%
Middlesex and Worcester	Democratic	James B. Eldridge	Won	Independent	Terra Friedrichs	4,033	4.65%
Middlesex and Worcester	Democratic	James B. Eldridge	Won		All Others	117	0.13%
Middlesex and Suffolk	Democratic	Sal N. DiDomenico	Won	Democratic	Sal N. DiDomenico	53,022	98.92%
Middlesex and Suffolk	Democratic	Sal N. DiDomenico	Won		All Others	577	1.08%
Norfolk, Bristol and Middlesex	Republican	Richard J. Ross	Won	Republican	Richard J. Ross	49,776	60.00%
Norfolk, Bristol and Middlesex	Republican	Richard J. Ross	Won	Democratic	Kristopher K. Aleksov	33,083	39.88%
Norfolk, Bristol and Middlesex	Republican	Richard J. Ross	Won		All Others	95	0.11%
Norfolk, Bristol and Plymouth	Democratic	Brian Joyce	Retired	Democratic	Walter F. Timilty Jr.	56,466	73.72%
Norfolk, Bristol and Plymouth	Democratic	Brian Joyce	Retired	Independent	Jonathan D. Lott	19,960	26.06%
Norfolk, Bristol and Plymouth	Democratic	Brian Joyce	Retired		All Others	167	0.22%
Norfolk and Plymouth	Democratic	John F. Keenan	Won	Democratic	John F. Keenan	50,148	70.98%
Norfolk and Plymouth	Democratic	John F. Keenan	Won	Independent	Alexander N. Mendez	20,433	28.92%
Norfolk and Plymouth	Democratic	John F. Keenan	Won		All Others	71	0.10%
Norfolk and Suffolk	Democratic	Michael F. Rush	Won	Democratic	Michael F. Rush	66,792	98.72%
Norfolk and Suffolk	Democratic	Michael F. Rush	Won		All Others	867	1.28%
Plymouth and Barnstable	Republican	Vinny M. deMacedo	Won	Republican	Vinny M. deMacedo	69,474	99.27%
Plymouth and Barnstable	Republican	Vinny M. deMacedo	Won		All Others	508	0.73%
Plymouth and Norfolk	Republican	Patrick M. O'Connor	Won	Republican	Patrick M. O'Connor	52,440	56.53%
Plymouth and Norfolk	Republican	Patrick M. O'Connor	Won	Democratic	Paul J. Gannon	40,193	43.32%
Plymouth and Norfolk	Republican	Patrick M. O'Connor	Won		All Others	140	0.15%
1st Plymouth and Bristol	Democratic	Marc R. Pacheco	Won	Democratic	Marc R. Pacheco	52,915	65.28%
1st Plymouth and Bristol	Democratic	Marc R. Pacheco	Won	Republican	Sandra M. Wright	28,059	34.61%
1st Plymouth and Bristol	Democratic	Marc R. Pacheco	Won		All Others	87	0.11%
2nd Plymouth and Bristol	Democratic	Michael D. Brady	Won	Democratic	Michael D. Brady	56,156	99.42%
2nd Plymouth and Bristol	Democratic	Michael D. Brady	Won		All Others	330	0.58%
1st Suffolk	Democratic	Linda Dorcena Forry	Won	Democratic	Linda Dorcena Forry	59,874	98.41%
1st Suffolk	Democratic	Linda Dorcena Forry	Won		All Others	966	1.59%
2nd Suffolk	Democratic	Sonia Rosa Chang-Díaz	Won	Democratic	Sonia Rosa Chang-Díaz	58,705	98.80%
2nd Suffolk	Democratic	Sonia Rosa Chang-Díaz	Won		All Others	713	1.20%
1st Suffolk and Middlesex	Democratic	Joseph A. Boncore	Won	Democratic	Joseph A. Boncore	50,978	98.17%
1st Suffolk and Middlesex	Democratic	Joseph A. Boncore	Won		All Others	951	1.83%
2nd Suffolk and Middlesex	Democratic	William N. Brownsberger	Won	Democratic	William N. Brownsberger	56,011	98.58%
2nd Suffolk and Middlesex	Democratic	William N. Brownsberger	Won		All Others	804	1.42%
Worcester and Middlesex	Democratic	Jennifer L. Flanagan	Won	Democratic	Jennifer L. Flanagan	59,860	99.13%
Worcester and Middlesex	Democratic	Jennifer L. Flanagan	Won		All Others	527	0.87%
Worcester and Norfolk	Republican	Ryan C. Fattman	Won	Republican	Ryan C. Fattman	64,665	98.45%
Worcester and Norfolk	Republican	Ryan C. Fattman	Won		All Others	1,021	1.55%
Worcester, Hampden, Hampshire and Middlesex	Democratic	Anne M. Gobi	Won	Democratic	Anne M. Gobi	44,021	54.37%
Worcester, Hampden, Hampshire and Middlesex	Democratic	Anne M. Gobi	Won	Republican	James P. Ehrhard	36,883	45.55%
Worcester, Hampden, Hampshire and Middlesex	Democratic	Anne M. Gobi	Won		All Others	68	0.08%
1st Worcester	Democratic	Harriette L. Chandler	Won	Democratic	Harriette L. Chandler	56,545	98.08%
1st Worcester	Democratic	Harriette L. Chandler	Won		All Others	1,104	1.92%
2nd Worcester	Democratic	Michael O. Moore	Won	Democratic	Michael O. Moore	55,093	73.98%
2nd Worcester	Democratic	Michael O. Moore	Won	Republican	Mesfin H. Beshir	19,250	25.85%
2nd Worcester	Democratic	Michael O. Moore	Won		All Others	125	0.17%

Source: Secretary of the Commonwealth of Massachusetts, Ballotpedia

== See also ==
- 2016 Massachusetts elections
