= Buoniconti =

Buoniconti is an Italian surname. Notable people with the surname include:

- Nick Buoniconti (1940–2019), American football player
- Stephen Buoniconti (born 1969), American politician

The Italian meaning of Buoniconti is good person.
