= Dianne Wilkerson =

American politician

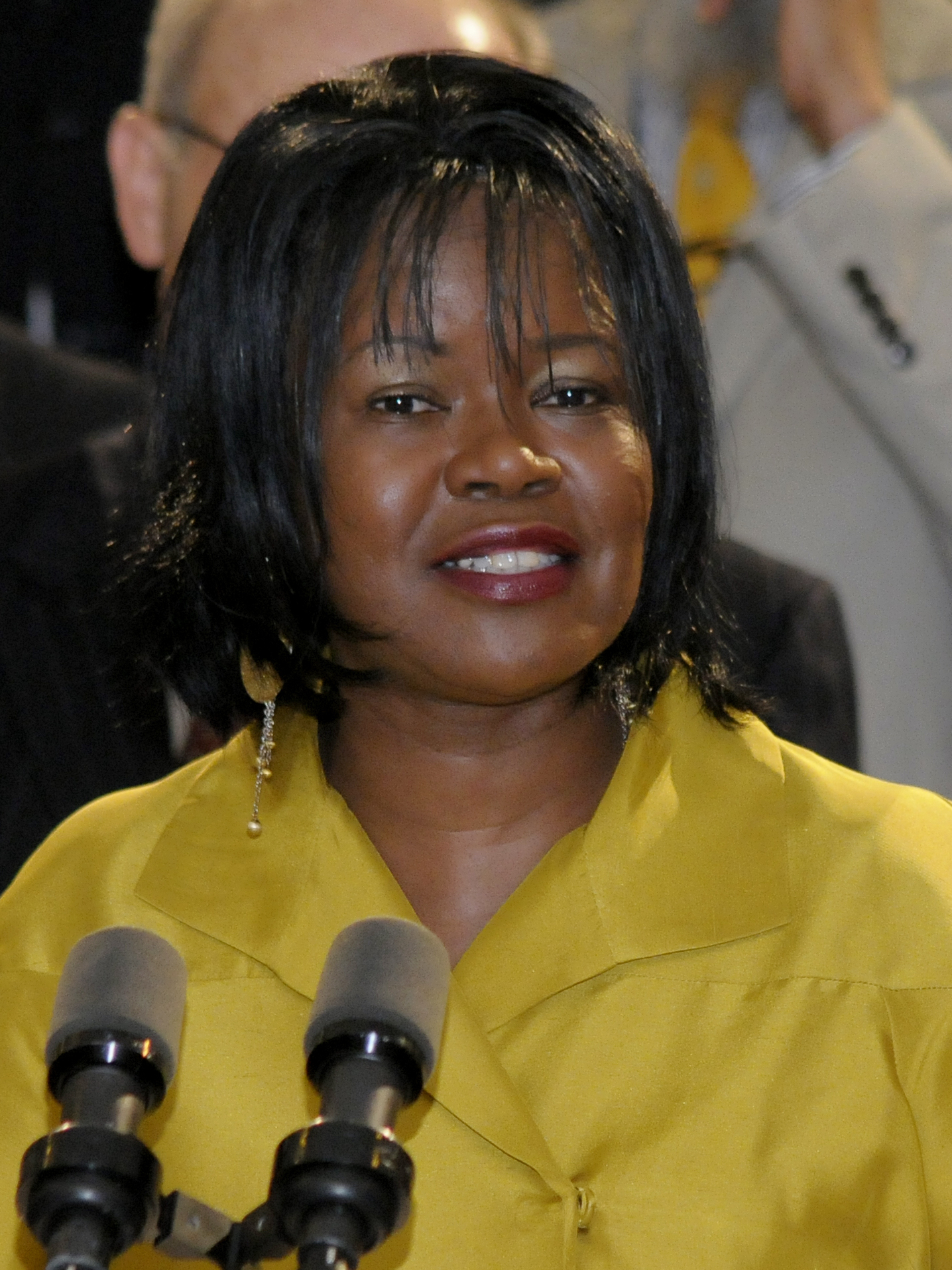
- Wilkerson in 2008

Member of the Massachusetts Senate from the 2nd Suffolk district
- In office 1993–2008
- Preceded by: Bill Owens
- Succeeded by: Sonia Chang-Díaz

Personal details
- Born: May 2, 1955 (age 71) Pine Bluff, Arkansas
- Party: Democratic
- Education: American International College, Boston College
- Occupation: attorney

Dianne Wilkerson (born May 2, 1955) is a former Democratic member of the Massachusetts Senate, representing the 2nd Suffolk District from 1993 to 2008 as the first African American female to serve in the chamber.

On October 28, 2008, she was arrested on public corruption charges by the FBI for accepting bribes totaling $23,500. She formally resigned on November 19, 2008. On June 3, 2010, she pleaded guilty to eight felony counts of attempted extortion. She was disbarred from the practice of law in the Commonwealth of Massachusetts on November 24, 2010, and served a federal prison sentence from 2011 to 2013.

== Education ==
Dianne Wilkerson graduated from High School of Commerce in Springfield. She earned a Bachelor of Science degree in public administration from American International College in 1978, and a juris doctor from Boston College Law School in 1981. After graduating from law school and passing the bar she served as a civil rights lawyer and was active in the National Lawyers Guild.

== Political career ==
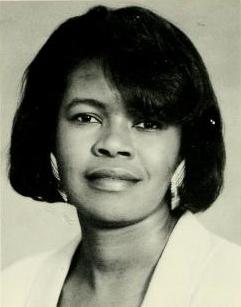
Official portrait, 1993

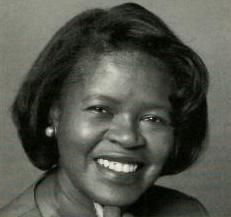
Official portrait, 2005

In 1993, she became the first African American woman to serve in the Massachusetts Senate, winning election in 1992 after defeating incumbent Bill Owens in the Democratic primary.

When in office, Wilkerson's Senatorial District included the Back Bay, Beacon Hill, Chinatown, Jamaica Plain, Mission Hill, Roxbury, South End, and some parts of the Fenway, Dorchester, and Mattapan.

During the 2008 Democratic Party presidential primaries, Wilkerson endorsed the candidacy of Barack Obama.

Wilkerson lost her September 2008 state senate Democratic primary to Sonia Chang-Díaz, and on October 31, 2008, announced that she was ending her write-in campaign to seek re-election in the November 4, 2008, election. On November 19, 2008, Wilkerson formally resigned from the Massachusetts state Senate.

In April 2022, following Sonia Chang-Diaz's decision not to run for re-election, she filed papers for another Senate run. She lost the Democratic primary to state Representative Liz Miranda, coming in third with 21% of the vote.

=== Legislative appointments ===
As State Senator, she was appointed to the following: the Commission to Eliminate Racial & Ethnic Healthcare Disparities, the Hynes Convention Center & Boston Common Parking Garage Legislative Commission, the Special Commission on Non-Group and Small Group Health Insurance, Co-Chair; and the Massachusetts Workforce Investment Board.

=== Legislative committees ===
Senate Chair, Joint Committee on State Administration and Regulatory Oversight; the Joint Committee on Financial Services; the Senate Committee on Ways and Means; the Joint Committee on Education; the Joint Committee on Mental Health and Substance Abuse; and the Joint Committee on Bonding, Capital Expenditures and State Assets.

== Legal troubles ==
=== Federal tax evasion ===
Wilkerson was sentenced to house arrest in December 1997 after pleading guilty to failing to pay $51,000 in federal income taxes in the early 1990s. She was suspended from practicing law for one year in 1999 because of the conviction and did not seek reinstatement.

=== Ethics violations ===
==== Fleet/BankBoston merger ====
In 2001, she was fined $1,000 by the State Ethics Commission for failing to properly report that a bank she lobbied for as senator was paying her more than $20,000 a year as a consultant.

==== Unreported donations ====
In September 2005, the Massachusetts Attorney General Thomas Reilly and head of the state's campaign finance office filed a lawsuit against Wilkerson, alleging she had not reported nearly $27,000 in donations and refused to explain more than $18,000 in personal reimbursements. She agreed to pay a $10,000 fine and forgo about $30,000 in debts owed her to settle the allegations.

=== Perjury complaint ===
The state Office of the Bar Counsel filed a complaint on October 3, 2008, accusing Wilkerson of violating the rules of professional conduct by lying under oath at a 2005 court hearing at which her nephew, Jermaine Berry, requested a new trial on a manslaughter conviction.

Wilkerson, who joined the bar in 1981 but had not practiced in a decade, gave "intentionally false, misleading, and deceptive testimony" at the Suffolk Superior Court hearing and in an affidavit, according to the eight-page petition for discipline.

In both the court appearance and the affidavit, the complaint said, Wilkerson falsely claimed that she was present at a Boston police station when two homicide detectives interviewed another nephew, Isaac Wilkerson, about the 1994 stabbing death of Hazel Mack. Berry was convicted of voluntary manslaughter in Mack's death, but the senator testified that Isaac Wilkerson made statements that implicated himself during the interview.

Wilkerson also lied when she testified that the detectives repeatedly turned a tape recorder off and on during the interview, the disciplinary complaint said.

=== Public corruption conviction ===
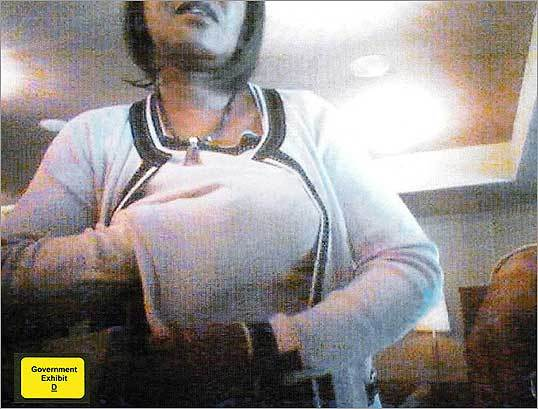
Photo of Wilkerson taking a bribe.

On October 28, 2008, Wilkerson was arrested by the FBI on public corruption charges. A federal criminal complaint was filed against her that alleges she was caught on tape stuffing a cash bribe into her bra and accepted those cash payments in exchange for her official duties and responsibilities.

Wilkerson was the subject of an 18-month-long undercover investigation conducted by the Boston Police Department and the FBI in which she allegedly accepted eight bribes in cash totaling $23,500. The payments, ranging in amounts from $500 to $10,000 were received from undercover law enforcement officers and a cooperating witness. The bribes were allegedly accepted in return for her help in obtaining a liquor license for a proposed nightclub and transferring public land to a federal agent posing as a private developer.

On November 17, 2008, Wilkerson filed a motion in federal court requesting a court-appointed lawyer to defend her against the bribery charges. She stated that she could not afford to pay for a lawyer and asked US Magistrate Judge Timothy S. Hillman to appoint Max D. Stern. Stern had been defending Wilkerson in an unrelated matter.

On November 18, 2008, a federal grand jury indicted Wilkerson on eight counts of accepting bribes.

On December 8, 2008, Wilkerson appeared before Judge Timothy S. Hillman in the U.S. District Court in Boston to plead not guilty to eight extortion charges. After a federal grand jury added a conspiracy charge against Wilkerson, she had to return to court on December 11 along with co-defendant Boston City Councilor Chuck Turner to again plead not guilty to all charges. On April 7, 2009, a federal grand jury added 23 more counts of corruption against Wilkerson. It was alleged that she had been receiving bribes since 2002. On June 3, 2010, Wilkerson pleaded guilty to eight counts of attempted extortion. As part of her plea agreement, other related charges will be dismissed. She remained free on bail while awaiting sentencing.

On January 6, 2011, Wilkerson was sentenced to three and a half years in prison for bribery.

==== Effect on political career ====
Despite the arrest, Wilkerson initially vowed to continue her write-in candidacy and criticized United States Attorney Michael J. Sullivan, whom she accused of "engaging in a political calculus to derail her campaign". However, on October 31, after meeting with members of Boston's Ten Point Coalition and Black Ministerial Alliance, she agreed to suspend her campaign stating "I am withdrawing from the race. We will not be doing any work on the sticker campaign".

In response to the arrest, Senate President Therese Murray stripped Wilkerson of her chairmanship of the Committee on State Administration and Regulatory Oversight and stated that she would initiate a Senate Ethics Committee investigation. On October 30, 2008, the Massachusetts Senate removed her from all her committee assignments and unanimously passed a resolution calling on her to resign. In response, Wilkerson sent a letter to Senate President Murray stating that she would follow the will of the Senate. Wilkerson was not present during the Senate vote. Wilkerson later released a statement indicating that she would not resign, calling the request "unreasonable" and also stating: "Surely the members of the state Senate could not have believed that such a monumental decision would be made within a few hours. A decision to leave this district without representation, even for 60 days, is one that cannot and should not be made in a matter of hours. Rest assured I am committed to do what is in the best interest of the residents of this district."

In the days following her arrest, calls for Wilkerson's resignation also came from Massachusetts Governor Deval Patrick and in editorials from Boston's two major newspapers, the Boston Herald and The Boston Globe.

On November 5, 2008, in a statement issued by her Senate office, Wilkerson announced that she would resign "...as soon as humanly and responsibly possible." On November 19, 2008, Wilkerson formally resigned from the Massachusetts Senate, the day before the Senate was to vote on expelling her.

Wilkerson was released from prison September 27, 2013. In February 2014, Wilkerson received an award as one of 18 "women of color changing our world", presented by the Mayor of Boston, Marty Walsh.

Political offices
Preceded by Bill Owens	Massachusetts State Senator for 2nd Suffolk District; 1993–2008	Succeeded by Sonia Chang-Díaz
