= John Cronin (Massachusetts politician) =

American politician

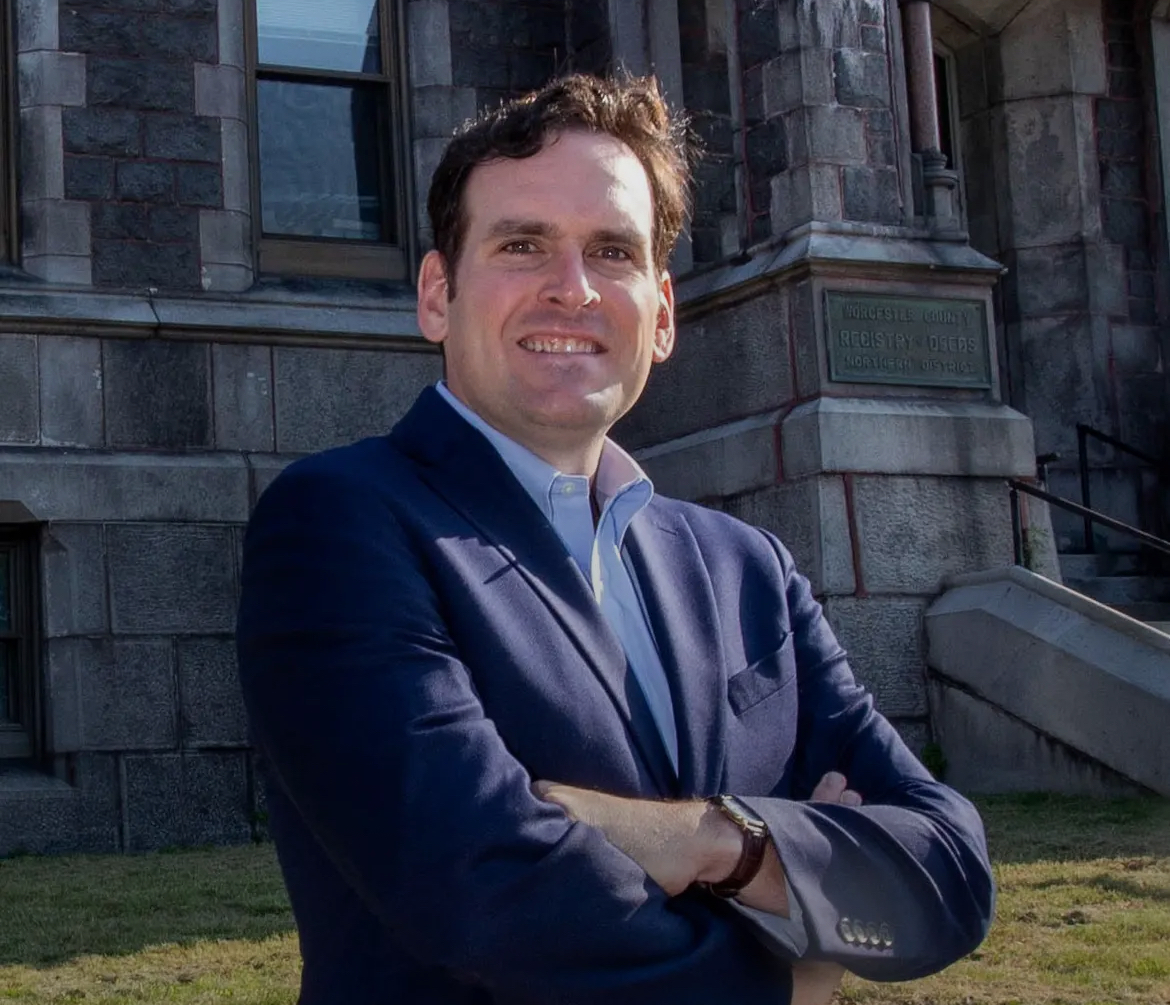
- Cronin in 2026

Member of the Massachusetts Senate from the Worcester and Middlesex district
- Incumbent
- Assumed office January 6, 2021
- Preceded by: Dean Tran

Personal details
- Born: Leominster, Massachusetts
- Party: Democratic
- Education: United States Military Academy at West Point
- Website: johnjcronin.com

Military service
- Allegiance: United States
- Branch/service: United States Army
- Rank: Captain

John J. Cronin is an American politician and former military officer and veteran of the United States Army. Since 2021, he has served as a Massachusetts state senator, representing the Worcester and Middlesex district. He is a member of the Democratic Party.

Before election to the Massachusetts Senate, Cronin attended the United States Military Academy and served two tours in Afghanistan as an Army infantry officer. Cronin was honorably discharged from active duty as a Captain in 2018.

Cronin currently serves as the Senate Chair of the Joint Committee on Bonding, Capital Expenditures, and State Assets and the Joint Committee on Public Safety and Homeland Security, and as the Vice Chair of the Joint Committee on Healthcare Financing, and a member of the Senate Committee on Ways and Means. He currently represents the cities of Fitchburg, Leominster, and the towns of Lancaster, Lunenburg, Townsend, Ashby, Groton, Westford, Shirley, and Clinton in the Massachusetts Senate.

== Early life and education ==
John Joseph Cronin was born in Leominster. Cronin graduated from the United States Military Academy at West Point in 2013.

=== Military service ===
After graduation from West Point, Cronin commissioned as an infantry officer and was stationed in Texas with the 3rd Cavalry Regiment. Cronin served as a Rifle Platoon Leader and Executive Officer in an infantry company during his two tours of duty in Afghanistan. He is a recipient of the Combat Infantryman’s Badge and a combat veteran. He was honorably discharged from active duty as a Captain in 2018.

=== Law school ===
He earned his Juris Doctor from Suffolk University Law School in 2022 and is a licensed attorney.

== Legal career ==
In private practice, Cronin represents veterans with matters before the Veterans Administration. Prior to his election to the Massachusetts Senate, Cronin was a veteran advocate at the Harvard Law School Legal Services Center.

== Political career ==
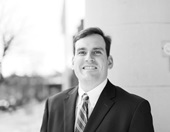
Portrait photograph of Cronin

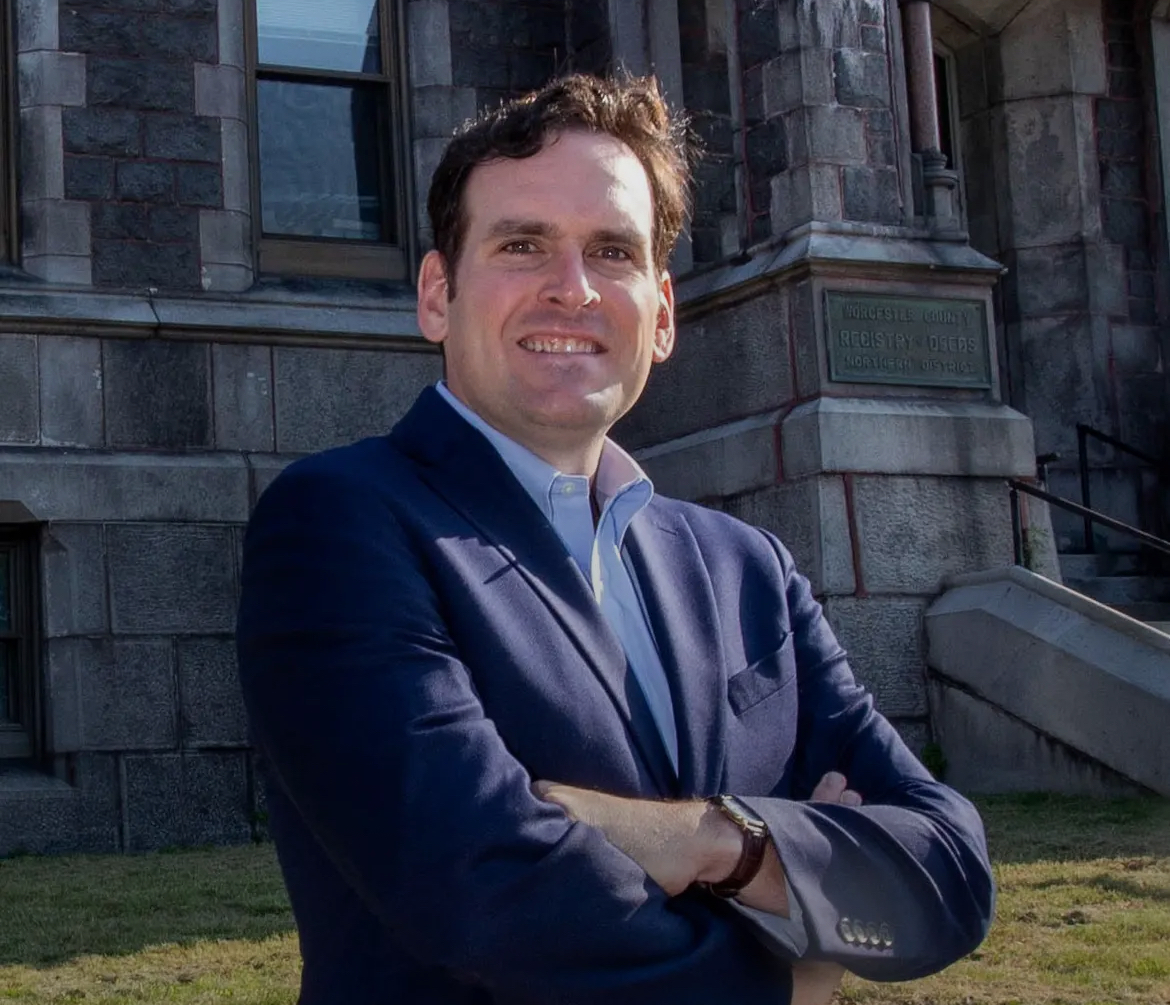
Cronin in 2026

Cronin was elected to the Massachusetts Senate in 2020, defeating Republican Dean Tran. He was re-elected in 2024. He represents the district of Worcester and Middlesex.

=== Innovation pathways and the Career Technical Initiative ===
Throughout his time in the Massachusetts Senate, Cronin has been an advocate for expanding funding for and access to workforce development programs. He made increasing access to vocational high schools a pillar of his 2020 campaign, often tying the region’s long-term success to 21st-century industries like life sciences and advanced manufacturing. During his first year in the Senate, Cronin secured $600,000 in seed funding for Innovation Pathway Programs (IPP), which provides high school students with the coursework and training to enter regionally aligned, high-demand industries directly after graduation. By 2023, IPP received more than $5 million in annual state funding with programs in healthcare, advanced manufacturing, and life sciences expanded to dozens of high schools across the state.

=== Gateway cities ===
Throughout his initial campaign and tenure in the Senate, Cronin has advocated for the restoration of Massachusetts’ Gateway Cities - midsize urban centers that anchor regional economies and have historically been viewed as a “gateway” to the American dream.

At the beginning of the 2023 legislative session, Cronin was named Senate Chair of the Gateway Cities Legislative Caucus (GCLC), composed of State Senators and Representatives across the Commonwealth’s 26 Gateway Cities. He currently chairs the caucus alongside New Bedford Representative Tony Cabral. Under Cronin and Cabral, the GCLC successfully advocated to expand funding for the Housing Development Incentive Program (HDIP), which allows the state to provide tax credits to developers who build housing in economically depressed corners of the state.

== See also ==
- 2021–2022 Massachusetts legislature
- 2020 Massachusetts Senate election
