= Massachusetts Senate's 2nd Bristol and Plymouth district =

American legislative district

Massachusetts Senate's 2nd Plymouth and Bristol district in the United States is one of 40 legislative districts of the Massachusetts Senate. As of the 2010 United States census, it includes 28.3% of Bristol County and 1.2% of Plymouth County. Since 2003, the district consists of the city of New Bedford and the towns of Acushnet, Dartmouth, and Fairhaven in Bristol County and the town of Mattapoisett in Plymouth County. From 1987 to 2003, the district consisted of Acushnet, Dartmouth, Fairhaven, and New Bedford and was numbered as the Second Bristol district.

Democrat Mark Montigny of New Bedford has represented the district since it was created in 2003. He ran unopposed in the 2020 Massachusetts Senate election.

== Locales represented ==
The district includes the following localities:

- New Bedford
- Acushnet
- Dartmouth
- Fairhaven
- Mattapoisett

== List of senators ==
Senator	Party	Years	Electoral history
District created in 2002.
Mark Montigny	Democratic	2003 –	Redistricted from the 2nd Bristol district. Re-elected in 2002. Re-elected in 2004. Re-elected in 2006. Re-elected in 2008. Re-elected in 2010. Re-elected in 2012. Re-elected in 2014. Re-elected in 2016. Re-elected in 2018. Re-elected in 2020.
