= Stephen Buoniconti =

American politician

Stephen J. Buoniconti
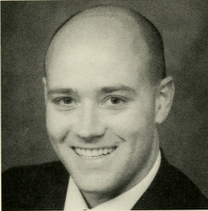
- Image of Stephen J. Buoniconti

Member of the Massachusetts Senate from the Hampden district
- In office January 2005 – January 5, 2011
- Preceded by: Linda J. Melconian
- Succeeded by: James T. Welch

Member of the Massachusetts House of Representatives from the 6th Hampden district
- In office January 2001 – January 2005
- Preceded by: Walter DeFilippi
- Succeeded by: James T. Welch

Personal details
- Born: September 4, 1969 (age 56) Holyoke, Massachusetts
- Party: Democratic
- Spouse: Angelina
- Children: Joanna, Samantha
- Website: stephenbuoniconti.org

Stephen J. Buoniconti (born September 4, 1969, in Holyoke, Massachusetts) is an American politician who represented the Hampden Districfrom the Massachusetts Senate from the year 2005 to 2011 and the 6th Hampden District in the Massachusetts House of Representatives from 2001 to 2005.

== Career ==
He was first elected to the Massachusetts Senate in 2004, taking office in January 2005. Buoniconti served in the Massachusetts House of Representatives from 2001 to 2005. Before being elected to the General Court, Buoniconti served as an Assistant District Attorney in Hampden County and was a member of the West Springfield School Committee (1998–2000) and was a West Springfield Town Meeting Member (1992–1996, 1998–2000).

== Education ==
He earned his B.A. from Fairfield University and his J.D. from Western New England College School of Law.
