= Massachusetts Senate's 2nd Suffolk district =

American legislative district

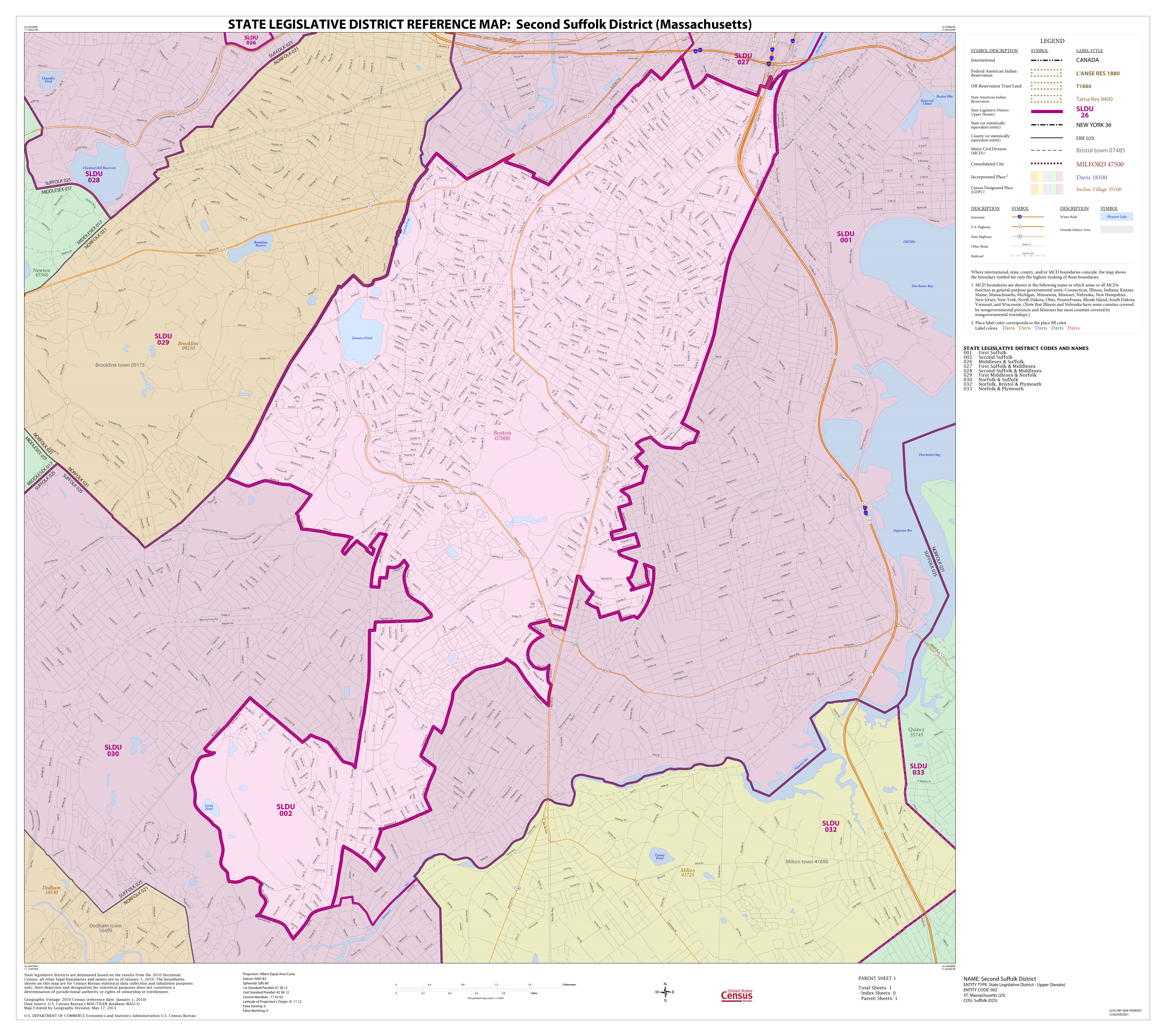
Map of Massachusetts Senate's 2nd Suffolk district, based on the 2010 United States census.

Massachusetts Senate's 2nd Suffolk district in the United States is one of 40 legislative districts of the Massachusetts Senate. It covers portions of Suffolk county. Democrat Liz Miranda of Roxbury has represented the district since 2023.

== Locales represented ==
The district includes parts of the city of Boston.

== Senators ==
- Oliver Frost, circa 1859
- George F. Monahan
- John I. Fitzgerald
- William J Francis
- Joseph A. Langone, Jr., circa 1935
- Robert L. Lee, circa 1945
- Mario Umana, circa 1957-1969
- Bill Owens, 1975-1983
- Royal Lee Bolling, Sr.,1983-1989
- Bill Owens, 1989–1993
- Dianne Wilkerson, 1993-2009
- Sonia Chang-Díaz, 2009-2023
- Liz Miranda, 2023-current

== Images ==
Portraits of legislators

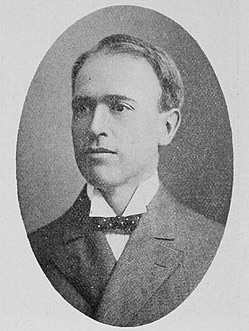
George Monahan

John I. Fitzgerald

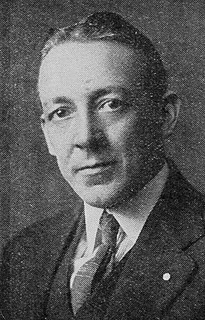
William J. Francis

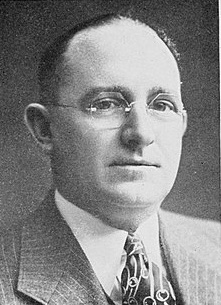
Robert Lee

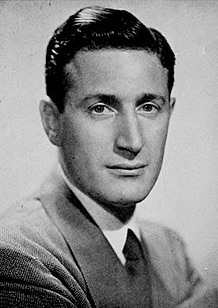
Mario Umana

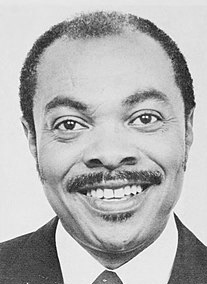
Bill Owens

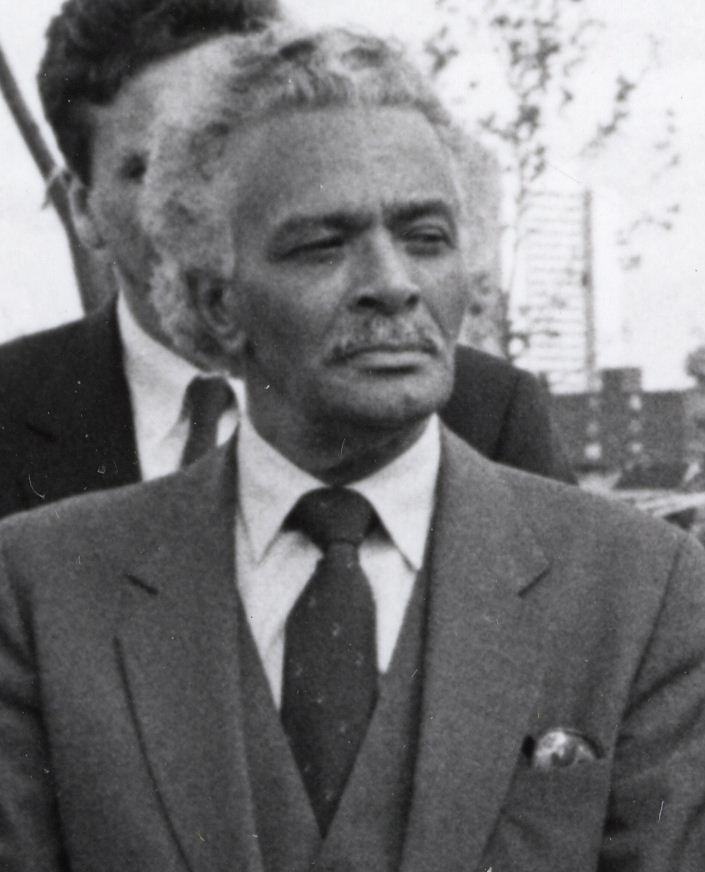
Royal Lee Bolling

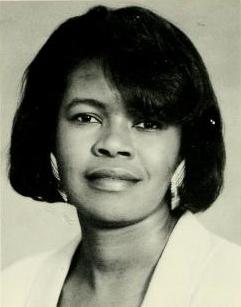
1993 Dianne Wilkerson

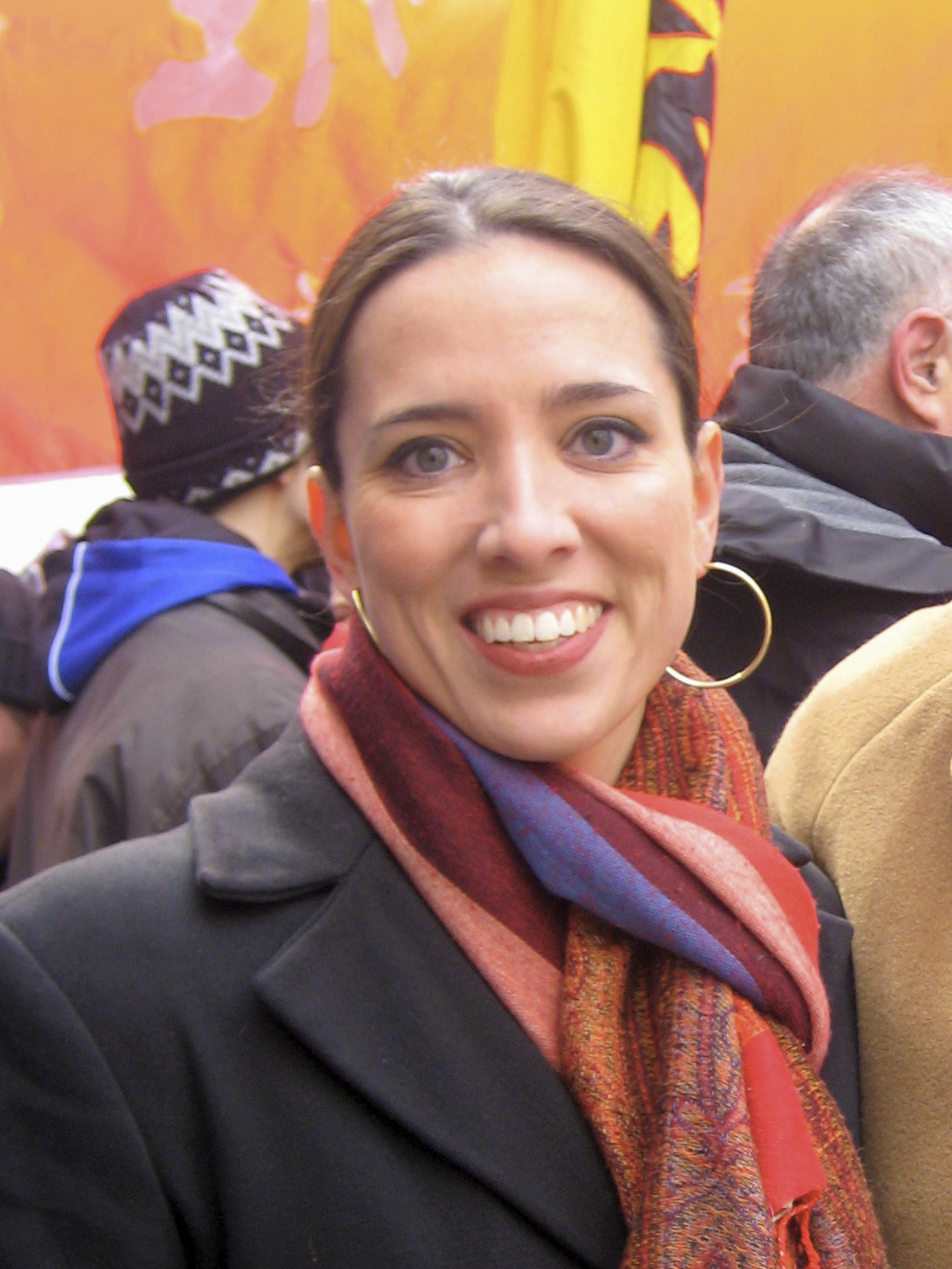
Sonya Chang-Diaz

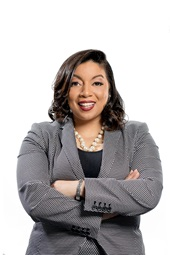
Liz Miranda

== See also ==
- List of Massachusetts Senate elections
- List of Massachusetts General Courts
- List of former districts of the Massachusetts Senate
- Suffolk County districts of the Massachusetts House of Representatives: 1st, 2nd, 3rd, 4th, 5th, 6th, 7th, 8th, 9th, 10th, 11th, 12th, 13th, 14th, 15th, 16th, 17th, 18th, 19th
