= Jennifer Flanagan =

American politician

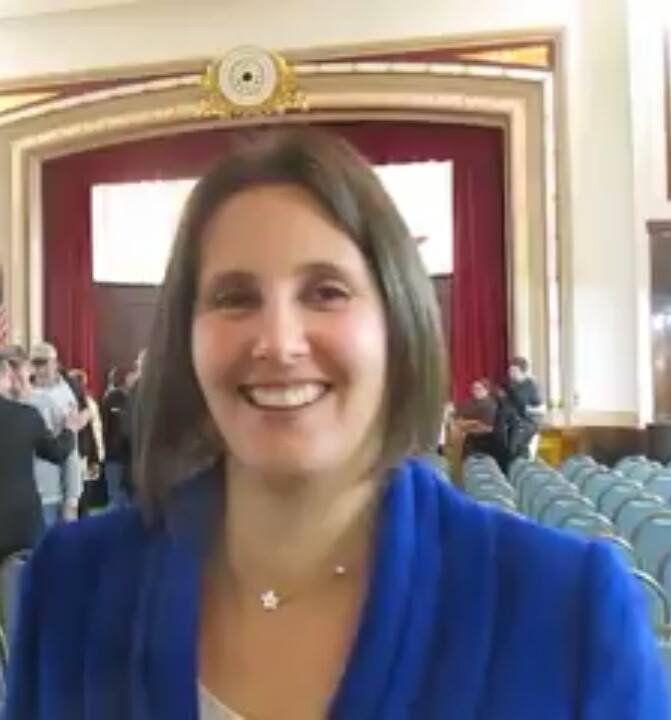

Member of the Massachusetts Cannabis Control Commission
- In office 2017–2021
- Preceded by: Initial member of commission
- Succeeded by: Kimberly Roy

Member of the Massachusetts Senate from the Worcester and Middlesex district
- In office 2009–2017
- Preceded by: Robert A. Antonioni
- Succeeded by: Dean Tran

Member of the Massachusetts House of Representatives from the 4th Worcester district
- In office 2005–2009
- Preceded by: Mary Jane Simmons
- Succeeded by: Dennis Rosa

Personal details
- Party: Democratic

Jennifer L. Flanagan is a former member of the Massachusetts General Court and the Massachusetts Cannabis Control Commission.

== Education ==
Flanagan graduated from Leominster High School, as well as from the University of Massachusetts Boston with a Bachelor of Arts in political science and from Fitchburg State College with a Master of Science in mental health counseling.

== Political career ==
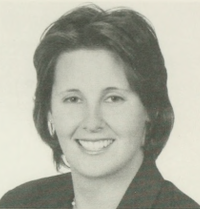
Official portrait, circa 2005

Flanagan served as a legislative aide and then chief of staff to then-Leominster State Rep. Mary Jane Simmons. In 2004 Simmons announced she would not seek re-election to the 4th Worcester district due to health concerns, and Flanagan ran for the open seat. Flanagan won the primary and general election, and served two terms as a Massachusetts State Representative.

Flanagan served as a Massachusetts State Senator for the Worcester and Middlesex district, which includes her hometown of Leominster. She is a Democrat who served from 2009, to 2017. She first won the State Senate seat in 2008, winning a contested Democratic primary and facing no general election opponent. When running for re-election in 2014 the nomination forms to get Flanagan on the primary ballot were filed with an incomplete address, forcing her to run a write-in campaign during the primary in order to be on the general election ballot. There was no candidate for the seat on either the Republican or Democratic primary ballots. Her general election opponent, Richard Bastien, also got on the general election ballot with a write-in campaign in the primary.

In 2017, Flanagan was chosen by Massachusetts Governor Charlie Baker as his pick for the newly formed Massachusetts Cannabis Control Commission. The appointment was notable because she opposed cannabis legalization and is from a different party than the governor. She stepped down in 2021 to become the director of regulatory policy at Vicente Sederberg.
