= Dean Tran =

American politician

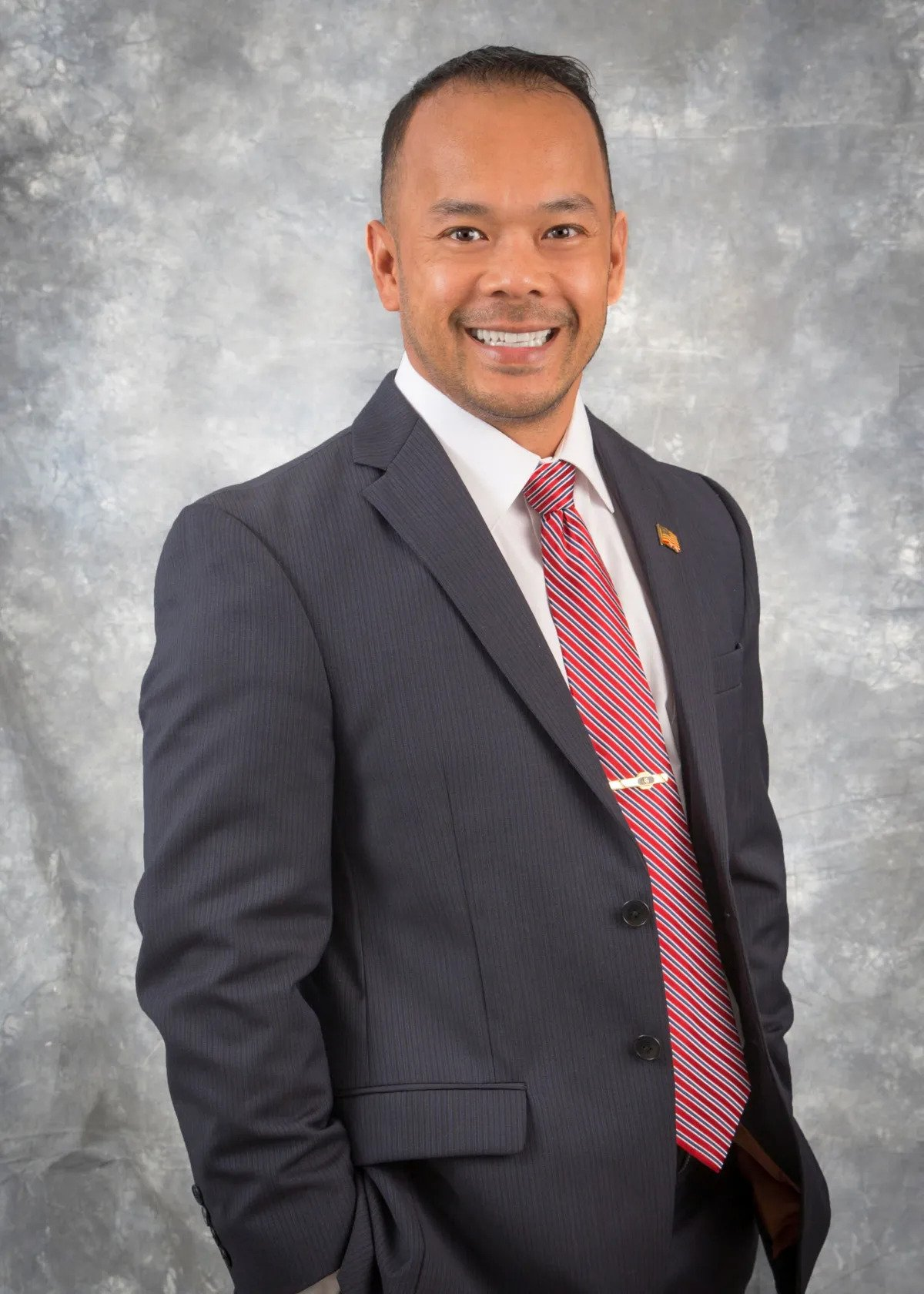

Massachusetts Senate Assistant Minority Whip
- In office 2019 – March 26, 2020

Member of the Massachusetts Senate from the Worcester and Middlesex district
- In office December 6, 2017 – January 6, 2021
- Preceded by: Jennifer Flanagan
- Succeeded by: John J. Cronin

Member of the Fitchburg City Council
- In office 2005–2017

Personal details
- Born: Saigon, Vietnam
- Party: Republican
- Spouse: Kerry A.Tran
- Children: 4
- Education: Brandeis University
- Website: www.deantran.com

Dean A. Tran is an American politician from Fitchburg, Massachusetts, who was elected to the Massachusetts Senate in 2017 in a special election. He represented the Worcester and Middlesex District, and is a Republican. Before his election to the Massachusetts Senate, Tran was a member of the Fitchburg City Council. In 2022 he was found guilty of Legal Issues including Ethic Violations, Fire Arms Violations and 20 counts of Federal Wire Fraud.

== Early life ==
Tran was born in Saigon, since renamed Ho Chi Minh City, Vietnam into a successful business family. He emigrated with his family to the United States at the age of 4. After fleeing Vietnam by boat, Tran’s family spent two years in a refugee camp in while waiting for their application for green cards to be approved. In 1980, he and his family were sponsored by a Catholic priest in Clinton, Massachusetts, which he calls his first real home. In 1986, his family relocated to Fitchburg, Massachusetts where he graduated from Fitchburg High School. Tran continued his education, earning a bachelor's degree from Brandeis University in 1997.

== Political career ==
In 2005, Tran became the first person of color elected to the Fitchburg City Council. On December 5, 2017, after 12 years as city councilor, Tran won a special election to replace outgoing state senator Jennifer Flanagan for State Senate representing the Worcester and Middlesex district, by less than 700 votes. He ran as an advocate for fiscal discipline and low taxes. Tran is the first Vietnamese American to hold an elected office in Massachusetts.

On December 20, 2017, Tran was officially sworn in to the State Senate. His senatorial district comprises Berlin, Bolton, Precincts 1 & 2 of Clinton, Fitchburg, Gardner, Lancaster, Leominster, Lunenburg, Sterling, Townsend and Westminster in north central Massachusetts. Tran was re-elected in the general election in November 2018, but he lost re-election in the 2020 general election to Democrat John Cronin, also by less than 700 votes.

On February 2, 2022 Tran officially kicked off his campaign to challenge Lori Trahan in the 2022 Midterm election for the 3rd congressional district. Tran lost against Trahan by a sizable majority in the election, garnering only 36% of the vote.

=== Leadership and Committees ===
- Former Assistant Minority Whip
- Joint Committee on Public Safety and Homeland Security (ranking Minority member)
- Joint Committee on State Administration and Regulatory Oversight
- Joint Committee on Municipalities and Regional Government
- Joint Committee on Transportation (ranking Minority member)
- Joint Committee on Higher Education
- Senate Committee on Intergovernmental Affairs
- Joint Committee on Cannabis Policy

== Legal issues ==
=== Senate Ethics Committee rules ===
Tran was stripped of his leadership post, as assistant minority whip, in March 2020 after the Senate Ethics Committee ruled he violated ethics and campaign rules by having staffers work on his 2018 re-election campaign while on state time. He subsequently lost re-election in November of the same year. In September 2022, at the request of the Attorney General, he was charged by the Suffolk County District Attorney with two counts of violating state ethics laws.

=== Multiple Firearms Charges ===
On July 1, 2022, Tran was indicted on multiple firearms charges stemming from an incident when he allegedly stole a firearm from an elderly woman and lied to investigators about it. Tran filed suit in federal court on July 27, 2022 against Attorney General of Massachusetts Maura Healey, alleging the case against him is politically motivated by a partisan Democratic political figure. Tran pled "absolutely not guilty" on all charges on July 28, 2022.

In June 2023, Tran's home was raided by the FBI as part of a federal investigation unrelated to the firearm charges. This led to his arrest on November 17, 2023 on 25 federal wire fraud charges for fraudulently claiming $30,000 in COVID-19 unemployment benefits, as well as well as three counts of willfully filing false tax returns.

=== Federal Wire Fraud ===
In September 2024, he was convicted of 20 counts of wire fraud and three counts of filing false tax returns. He was then sentenced to 18 months in prison.

In January 2026, the U.S. Department of Justice announced that Tran had been sentenced to an additional year in prison for obstruction of justice and making false statements.

== Personal life ==
Tran is married to his wife Kerry. They have four children: Isabelle, Olivia, Madilyn, and Dean. In his spare time, Tran likes to spend time with his family and is a volunteer coach for youth soccer, basketball, and baseball. Before being elected to the state senate, he served on the Corporator Board for the Central Massachusetts YMCA, and the Board of Trustees for Mount Wachusett Community College. Tran continues to help families in need as Tran and staff were able to raise monetary donations to purchase food and Christmas gifts for the Perez children as well as give hundreds of dollars to the family to use for expenses.

Tran's daughter, Olivia, ran for a vacant Fitchburg City Council Ward 6 seat in November 2021. She earned 46% of the vote, but lost the election.

== See also ==
- 2019–2020 Massachusetts legislature
