= Sonia Chang-Díaz =

American politician (born 1978)

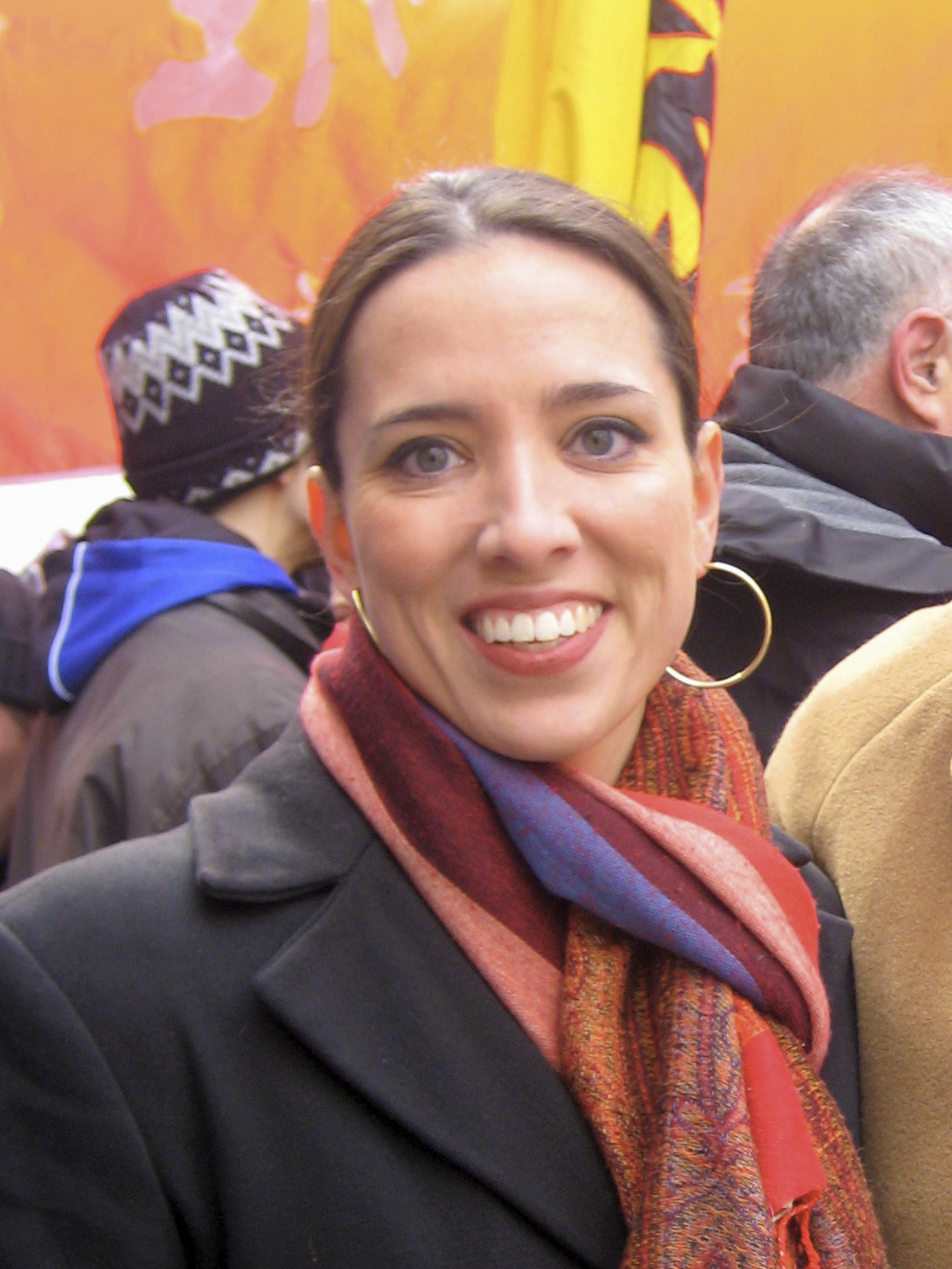
- Chang-Díaz, in 2009

Member of the Massachusetts Senate from the 2nd Suffolk district
- In office January 7, 2009 – January 4, 2023
- Preceded by: Dianne Wilkerson
- Succeeded by: Liz Miranda

Personal details
- Born: March 31, 1978 (age 48) Boston, Massachusetts, U.S.
- Party: Democratic
- Relatives: Franklin Chang-Díaz (father)
- Education: University of Virginia (BA)
- Website: Campaign website

Sonia Rosa Chang-Díaz (born March 31, 1978) is an American politician who served in the Massachusetts Senate from the 2nd Suffolk district as a member of the Democratic Party. She was the first Hispanic woman elected to the state senate. She ran for the Democratic nomination for Governor of Massachusetts in the 2022 election.

Chang-Díaz was educated at the University of Virginia. She entered politics while serving as a legislature aide for Massachusetts Senator Cheryl Jacques and as a campaign manager for MassEquality. She attempted to win election to the state senate in the 2006 election as a write-in candidate in the Democratic primary, but lost to incumbent Senator Dianne Wilkerson, who was also running as a write-in candidate. She ran again in the 2008 election and defeated Wilkerson in the primary and general elections.

== Early life ==
Sonia Chang-Díaz was born in Boston, Massachusetts, on March 31, 1978, the daughter of Franklin Chang-Díaz, a physicist who would be selected as a NASA astronaut in 1980. She graduated from the University of Virginia. She worked as one of Senator Cheryl Jacques' legislative aides and was a campaign manager for MassEquality.

== Massachusetts Senate ==
=== Elections ===
Massachusetts Senator Dianne Wilkerson failed to file her nomination petition with enough valid signatures to appear on the ballot in the Democratic primary during the 2006 election, but announced that she would run a write-in campaign for the Democratic nomination. Chang-Díaz announced on June 18, 2006, that she would run as a write-in candidate in the primary. Wilkerson defeated Chang-Díaz in the initial primary, but a judge ordered a recount due to write-in votes not being counted in eight precincts. Secretary of State William F. Galvin started an investigation into Boston's handling of elections due to the error. Chang-Díaz turned in enough signatures for a recount of all ten wards. The final recount determined that Wilkerson had won by 767 votes which was more than the initial 141 votes. Wilkerson won reelection in the general election.

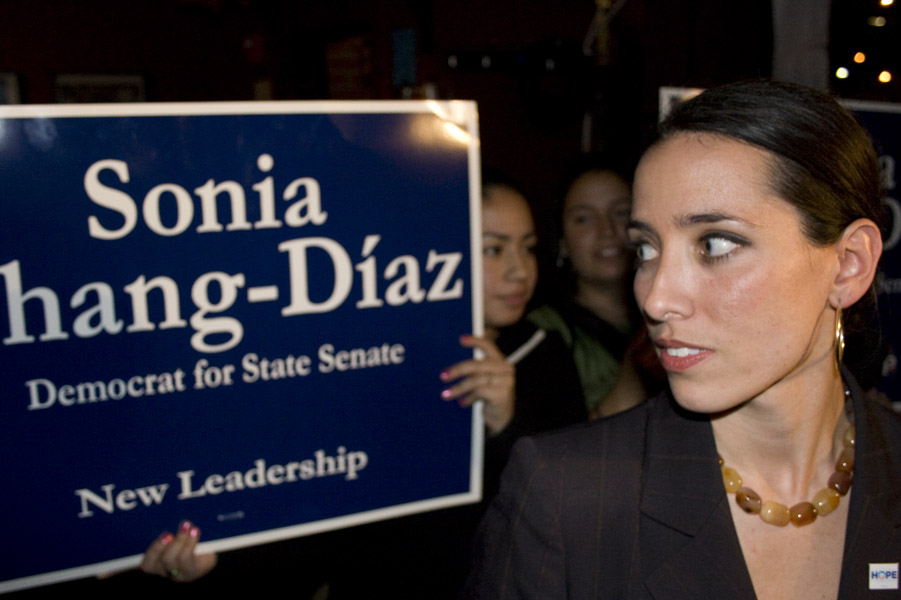
Chang-Díaz with supporters at her November 2008 election night celebration

Chang-Díaz ran against Wilkerson in the 2008 Democratic primary and defeated Wilkerson. A recount was conducted and maintained Chang-Díaz's victory. Wilkerson launched a write-in campaign in the general election, but withdrew after she was arrested on charges of public corruption and Chang-Díaz defeated Wilkerson and independent candidate William Theodore Leonard in the general election. She was the first Hispanic woman elected to the Massachusetts Senate.

She won reelection without opposition in the 2010, 2012, 2016, 2018, and 2020 elections. She defeated Republican nominee David James Wyatt in the 2014 election.

=== Tenure ===
During Chang-Díaz's tenure in the Massachusetts Senate she served as the chair of the Education committee, vice-chair of the Senate Redistricting committee, and assistant vice-chair of the Ways and Means committee. She was speculated as a possible candidate for the 2013 Boston mayoral election, but did not run and instead endorsed Marty Walsh. She endorsed Donald Berwick for the Democratic nomination in the 2014 gubernatorial election. She endorsed Senator Ed Markey in the Democratic primary during the 2020 United States Senate election. During the 2020 Democratic presidential primaries Chang-Díaz endorsed Senator Elizabeth Warren.

Chang-Díaz announced on June 23, 2021, that she would seek the Democratic nomination in the 2022 gubernatorial election, but ended her campaign on June 23, 2022, although she remained on the ballot.

== Political positions ==
Chang-Díaz was critical of legislation passed by the Massachusetts Senate which targeted the ability of undocumented immigrants to obtain services from the state including Medicaid and public housing. She opposed casinos stating that they were "a fancy way of putting a tax on the poor." Chang-Díaz supported raising the income tax to increase education funding.

She sponsored legislation to include transgender people in Massachusetts's anti-discrimination laws in 2011. She supported legislation which allowed people to use gendered-public places that matched their gender identity and gave protections against discrimination for transgender people.

== Electoral history ==
2006 Massachusetts Senate 2nd Suffolk district Democratic primary
Party	Candidate	Votes	%
Democratic	Dianne Wilkerson (write-in) (incumbent)	6,478	49.98%
Democratic	Sonia Chang-Díaz (write-in)	5,711	44.06%
Democratic	John G. Kelleher (write-in)	400	3.09%
Democratic	Samiyah Diaz (write-in)	238	1.84%
Write-in		134	1.03%
Total votes		12,961	100.00%
	Blank	12,645	

2008 Massachusetts Senate 2nd Suffolk district Democratic primary
Party	Candidate	Votes	%	±%
Democratic	Sonia Chang-Díaz	9,071	50.55%	+6.49%
Democratic	Dianne Wilkerson (incumbent)	8,858	49.36%	−0.62%
Write-in		15	0.08%	-0.95%
Total votes		17,944	100.00%	
	Blank	444		

2008 Massachusetts Senate 2nd Suffolk district election
Party	Candidate	Votes	%
Democratic	Sonia Chang-Díaz	55,865	92.29%
Independent	William Theodore Leonard	3,080	5.09%
Independent	Dianne Wilkerson (incumbent) (write-in)	988	1.63%
Write-in		597	0.99%
Total votes		60,530	100.00%
	Blank	10,147	

2010 Massachusetts Senate 2nd Suffolk district Democratic primary
Party	Candidate	Votes	%	±%
Democratic	Sonia Chang-Díaz (incumbent)	10,022	76.06%	+25.51%
Democratic	Hassan A. Williams	3,134	23.78%	+23.78%
Write-in		21	0.16%	+0.08%
Total votes		13,177	100.00%	
	Blank	1,087		

2010 Massachusetts Senate 2nd Suffolk district election
Party	Candidate	Votes	%	±%
Democratic	Sonia Chang-Díaz (incumbent)	38,997	98.36%	+6.07%
Write-in		650	1.64%	+0.65%
Total votes		39,647	100.00%	
	Blank	9,127		

2012 Massachusetts Senate 2nd Suffolk district Democratic primary
Party	Candidate	Votes	%	±%
Democratic	Sonia Chang-Díaz (incumbent)	8,904	83.18%	+7.12%
Democratic	Roy A. Owens	1,773	16.56%	+16.56%
Write-in		28	0.26%	+0.10%
Total votes		10,705	100.00%	
	Blank	962		

2012 Massachusetts Senate 2nd Suffolk district election
Party	Candidate	Votes	%	±%
Democratic	Sonia Chang-Díaz (incumbent)	54,886	98.58%	+0.22%
Write-in		791	1.42%	-0.22%
Total votes		55,677	100.00%	
	Blank	12,711		

2014 Massachusetts Senate 2nd Suffolk district Democratic primary
Party	Candidate	Votes	%	±%
Democratic	Sonia Chang-Díaz (incumbent)	10,900	80.59%	−2.59%
Democratic	Roy A. Owens	2,584	19.10%	+2.54%
Write-in		42	0.31%	+0.05%
Total votes		13,526	100.00%	
	Blank	2,432		

2014 Massachusetts Senate 2nd Suffolk district election
Party	Candidate	Votes	%	±%
Democratic	Sonia Chang-Díaz (incumbent)	33,742	89.77%	−8.81%
Republican	David James Wyatt	3,733	9.93%	+9.93%
Write-in		114	0.30%	-1.12%
Total votes		37,589	100.00%	
	Blank	4,648		

2016 Massachusetts Senate 2nd Suffolk district Democratic primary
Party	Candidate	Votes	%	±%
Democratic	Sonia Chang-Díaz (incumbent)	7,376	79.50%	−1.09%
Democratic	Roy A. Owens	1,859	20.04%	+0.94%
Write-in		43	0.46%	+0.15%
Total votes		9,278	100.00%	
	Blank	909		

2016 Massachusetts Senate 2nd Suffolk district election
Party	Candidate	Votes	%	±%
Democratic	Sonia Chang-Díaz (incumbent)	58,705	98.80%	+9.03%
Write-in		713	1.20%	+0.90%
Total votes		59,418	100.00%	
	Blank	12,760		

2018 Massachusetts Senate 2nd Suffolk district Democratic primary
Party	Candidate	Votes	%	±%
Democratic	Sonia Chang-Díaz (incumbent)	22,783	98.70%	+19.20%
Write-in		300	1.30%	+0.84%
Total votes		23,083	100.00%	
	Blank	5,413		

2018 Massachusetts Senate 2nd Suffolk district election
Party	Candidate	Votes	%	±%
Democratic	Sonia Chang-Díaz (incumbent)	50,742	98.87%	+0.07%
Write-in		582	1.13%	-0.07%
Total votes		51,324	100.00%	
	Blank	6,588		

2020 Massachusetts Senate 2nd Suffolk district Democratic primary
Party	Candidate	Votes	%	±%
Democratic	Sonia Chang-Díaz (incumbent)	33,053	99.16%	+0.46%
Write-in		279	0.84%	-0.46%
Total votes		33,332	100.00%	
	Blank	5,337		

2020 Massachusetts Senate 2nd Suffolk district election
Party	Candidate	Votes	%	±%
Democratic	Sonia Chang-Díaz (incumbent)	64,557	98.79%	−0.09%
Write-in		794	1.21%	+0.09%
Total votes		65,351	100.00%	
	Blank	9,383		

Massachusetts Senate
Preceded by Dianne Wilkerson	Massachusetts State Senator for 2nd Suffolk District; 2009–2023	Succeeded by Liz Miranda
