= Cynthia Stone Creem =

American politician (born 1942)

Cynthia Creem
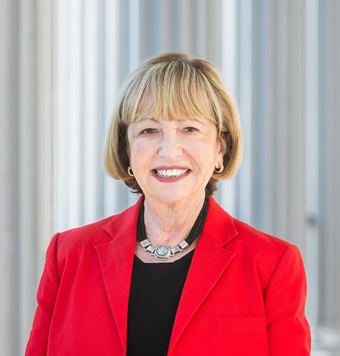

Majority Leader of the Massachusetts Senate
- Incumbent
- Assumed office February 28, 2018
- Preceded by: Harriette L. Chandler

Member of the Massachusetts Senate from the Norfolk and Middlesex district
- Incumbent
- Assumed office January 6, 1999
- Preceded by: Lois Pines (Note: As Senator from the 1st Middlesex and Norfolk district)

Member of the Massachusetts Governor's Council from the 3rd district
- In office January 1995 – January 6, 1999
- Preceded by: Robert B. Kennedy
- Succeeded by: Marilyn Petitto Devaney

Personal details
- Born: September 17, 1942 (age 83) Boston, Massachusetts, U.S.
- Party: Democratic
- Education: Boston University (BA, JD)

Cynthia Stone Creem (born September 17, 1942) is an American politician who serves as a member of the Massachusetts Senate for the Norfolk and Middlesex district. Formerly called the 1st Middlesex and Norfolk district, her constituency includes Brookline, Wellesley, and her hometown of Newton. A member of the Democratic Party, Creem was first elected in 1999 and has served as Majority Leader since 2018. Prior to serving in the Massachusetts legislature, she was an attorney who served on the Massachusetts Governor's Council and the Newton Board of Aldermen.

In late 2011, Creem considered running for Congress in Massachusetts's 4th congressional district to replace retiring Rep. Barney Frank, but decided to remain in the Massachusetts Senate. The seat was ultimately won by Joe Kennedy III.

== Political career ==
In 2018, Creem, along with Senator Anne Gobi, led the fight to pass H.4671, an act automatically registering eligible voters and enhancing safeguards against fraud. The bill created a framework for eligible voters to automatically register to vote when receiving services form the Register of Motor Vehicles and MassHealth. The bill also applies existing penalties for voter fraud to a fine of up to $10,000 or a five-year prison sentence.

== Personal life ==
Creem and her husband, Harvey, have two children and four grandchildren. She is Jewish.

== Notes ==
Massachusetts Senate
Preceded by Harriette L. Chandler	Majority Leader of the Massachusetts Senate; 2018–present	Incumbent
