= 2018 Massachusetts Senate election =

- November 6, 2018

All 40 seats in the Massachusetts Senate 21 seats needed for a majority
- Registered: 4,574,967 (▲0.88 pp)
- Turnout: 60.17% (▼14.34 pp)
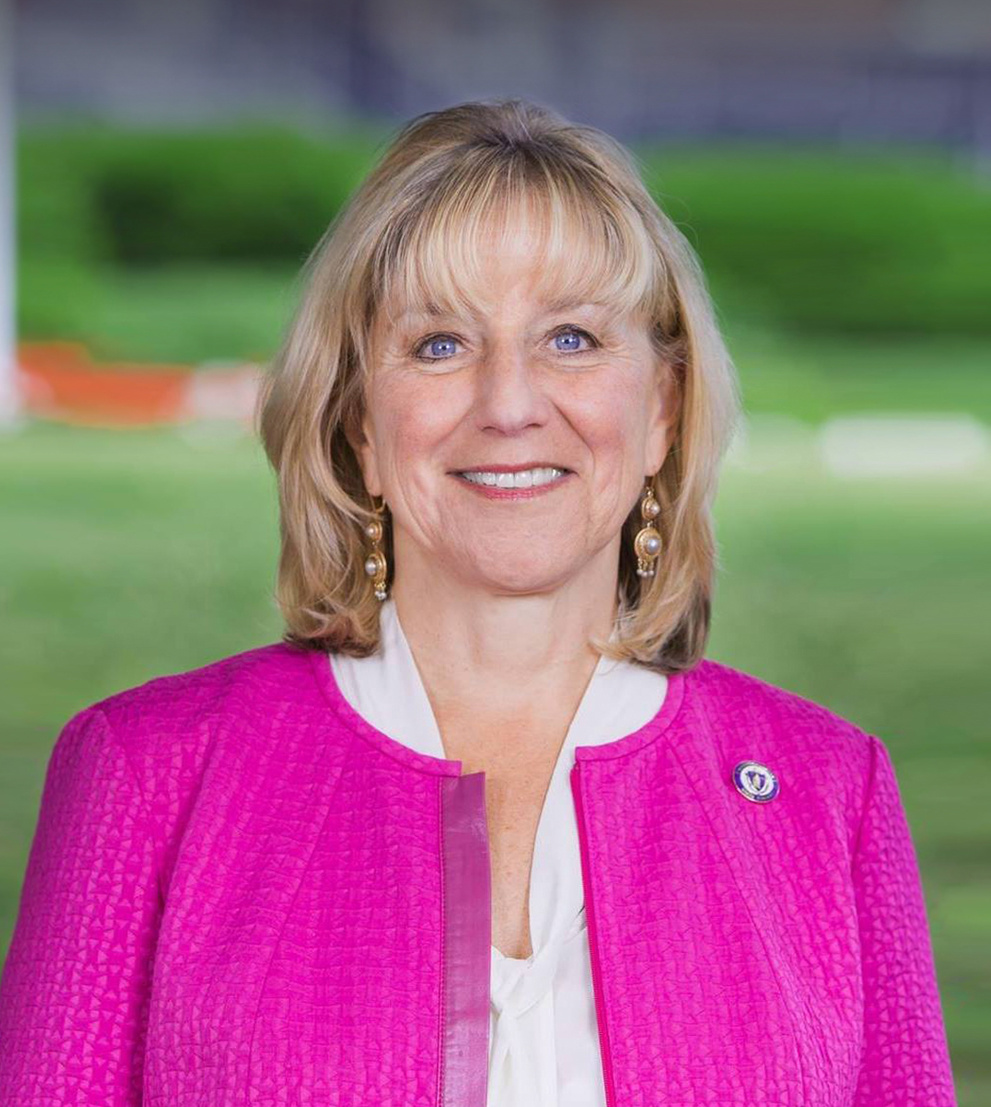

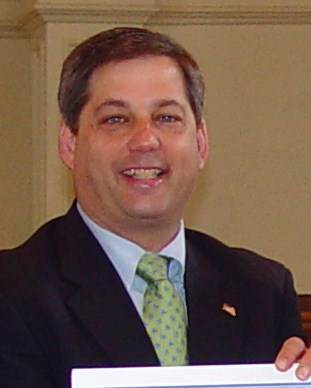
	Majority party	Minority party
Leader	Karen Spilka	Bruce Tarr
Party	Democratic	Republican
Leader since	February 28, 2018	January 3, 2011
Leader's seat	2nd Middlesex and Norfolk	1st Essex and Middlesex
Last election	34 seats	6 seats
Seats before	31	7
Seats won	34	6
Seat change	▲3	▼1
- Results of the elections: Democratic gain Democratic hold Republican hold
President before election
Karen Spilka
Democratic
Elected President
Karen Spilka
Democratic

The 2018 Massachusetts Senate election took place on November 6, 2018 to elect members of the Massachusetts Senate. Massachusetts voters elected all 40 members of the State Senate to serve two-year terms in the Massachusetts General Court. The election coincided with United States national elections and Massachusetts state elections, including U.S. Senate, U.S. House, and Massachusetts House.

Democrats expanded their supermajority from 31 seats before the election to 34 after the election.

== Predictions ==
Source	Ranking	As of
Governing	Safe D	October 8, 2018

== Detailed results ==
=== 1st Bristol and Plymouth District ===
Massachusetts 1st Bristol and Plymouth District general election, 2018
Party	Candidate	Votes	%
Democratic	Michael Rodrigues (incumbent)		
Total votes			100.0%
Democratic hold			

=== Worcester and Middlesex District ===
Worcester and Middlesex District general election, 2018
Party	Candidate	Votes	%
Republican	Dean Tran (incumbent)	33,043	
Democratic	Susan Chalifoux Zephir	27,792	
Write-in	Write-ins		
Total votes			100.0
Republican hold			

=== Norfolk, Bristol and Middlesex District ===
Norfolk, Bristol and Middlesex District, 2018
Party	Candidate	Votes	%
Democratic	Becca Rausch		
Republican	Richard Ross (incumbent)		
Total votes			100.0
Democratic gain from Republican			

== See also ==
- 2018 Massachusetts general election
- 2017–2018 Massachusetts legislature
