= Patrick O'Connor (Massachusetts politician) =

American politician (born 1984)

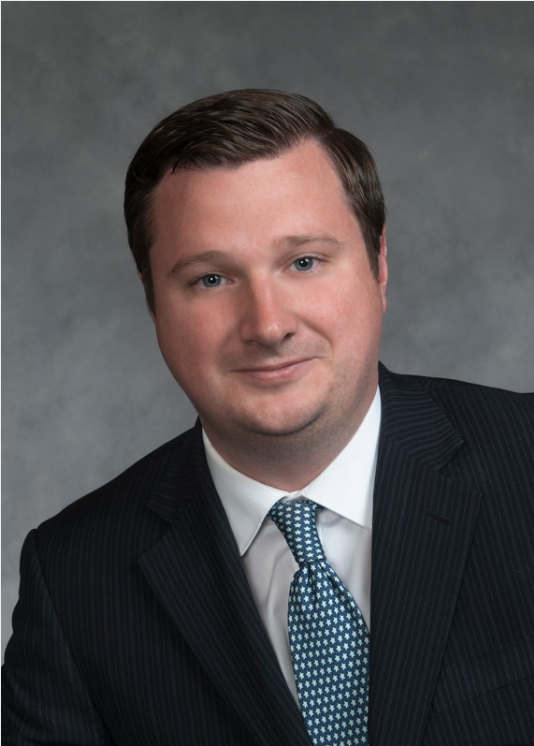

Member of the Massachusetts Senate from the Plymouth and Norfolk district
- Incumbent
- Assumed office May 18, 2016
- Preceded by: Bob Hedlund

Personal details
- Born: August 13, 1984 (age 42) Weymouth, Massachusetts, U.S.
- Party: Republican
- Education: Kingston University

Patrick M. O'Connor (born August 13, 1984) is an American politician from Weymouth, Massachusetts, who was elected to the Massachusetts Senate on May 10, 2016, in a special election to replace Robert Hedlund. He represents the First Plymouth and Norfolk District, which comprises Cohasset, Duxbury, Hingham, Hull, Marshfield, Norwell, Scituate, and Weymouth.

== Early life and education ==
Patrick was born and raised in Weymouth and graduated from the Weymouth Public Schools system. His father, Michael, is a plumber. His mother, Terry, is a nurse.

When he was 13 years old, he co-founded L40 Networks, an internet advertising and content promotion company. This venture afforded him the opportunity to attend school in London at Kingston University where he studied politics and economics.

== Political career ==
O'Connor was elected to the Weymouth Town Council in 2005 and became president in 2014. From 2008-15, he served as legislative director to State Senator Bob Hedlund and ran for State Senate following Hedlund's election as mayor of Weymouth.

In a special election on May 10, 2016, O'Connor won 53% of the vote to 47% by Democratic candidate former selectman Joan Meschino of Hull. O'Connor was elected to his first full term on November 8, 2016, and is seeking another two year term.

During an interview with WCVB former Massachusetts GOP chair Kirsten Hughes suggested that O'Connor would be a good candidate for Governor of Massachusetts in 2022, should Charlie Baker not seek a third term.

== See also ==
- 2019–2020 Massachusetts legislature
- 2021–2022 Massachusetts legislature
