= Karen Spilka =

American politician (born 1953)

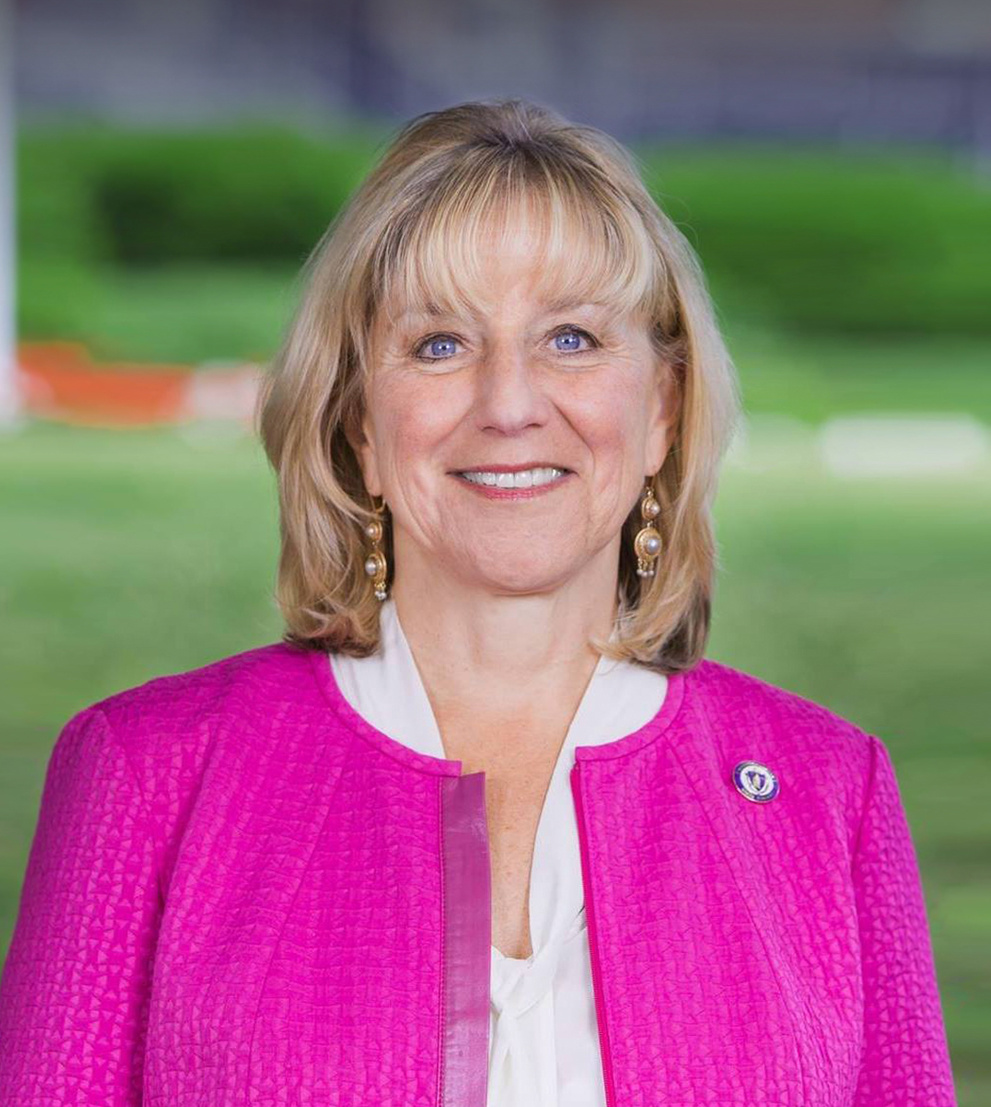

95th President of the Massachusetts Senate
- Incumbent
- Assumed office July 26, 2018
- Preceded by: Harriette L. Chandler

Member of the Massachusetts Senate from the 2nd Middlesex and Norfolk district
- Incumbent
- Assumed office January 5, 2005
- Preceded by: David Magnani

Member of the Massachusetts House of Representatives from the 7th Middlesex district
- In office November 2001 – January 2005
- Preceded by: John Stefanini
- Succeeded by: Tom Sannicandro

Personal details
- Born: Karen Eileen Spilka; January 11, 1953 (age 73) New York City, New York, U.S.
- Party: Democratic
- Spouse: Joel Loitherstein
- Children: 3
- Education: Cornell University (BS); Northeastern University (JD)
- Website: Official website

Karen Eileen Spilka (born January 11, 1953) is an American politician and attorney serving as a Democratic member of the Massachusetts Senate. She represents the towns of Ashland, Framingham, Holliston, Hopkinton, Medway and Natick in the MetroWest region of Massachusetts. She has served as the 95th President of the Massachusetts Senate since July 2018. Previously she served as a member of the Massachusetts House of Representatives from 2001 to 2005.

Spilka's legislative accomplishments include efforts in a broad range of areas including economic development, jobs creation, education, juvenile justice and services for the elderly and disabled communities.

== Early life and education ==
Karen Spilka was born in New York City on January 11, 1953, to Sydney Spilka, a World War II veteran of the U.S. Army, and Dorothy "Dottie" Spilka, a social worker. During his service in the military, her father stepped on a landmine. Following his return stateside, he struggled with the effects of what was then called "shell shock", which today is known as post traumatic stress disorder.

Spilka grew up in Yonkers, New York, where she was sophomore class president at Lincoln High School and editor-in-chief of the yearbook, The Lincoln Log.

Spilka moved to Boston in 1975 after earning her degree in social work from Cornell University, where she became a family counselor and waited tables part time. She then received her Juris Doctor from Northeastern University School of Law.

== Early career ==
Prior to becoming a legislator, Spilka worked in private practice as an arbitrator and mediator, specializing in labor and employment law and community and court mediation. In addition, she has been a facilitator and fact finder in disputes in the public and private sectors, as well as a social worker and trainer of adult mediation and school-based peer mediation programs, collaborative-based collective bargaining and conflict resolution strategies.

== Massachusetts Legislature ==
Spilka was first elected to the Massachusetts House of Representatives in the fall of 2001, where she served three years before her election to the Massachusetts State Senate in January 2005. In the Senate she served as Chair of the Joint Committee on Children, Families and Persons with Disabilities, Chair of the Joint Committee on Economic Development and Emerging Technologies, Majority Whip, and Chair of the Senate Committee on Ways and Means, where she oversaw the creation of the annual state budget.

=== LGBTQ rights ===
Spilka describes herself as an "early and ardent supporter of equal marriage and transgender protections". In 2004, at that time a representative, she joined many of her colleagues in voting for Massachusetts to become the first state in the United States to allow same-sex marriage.

=== MetroWest Regional Transit Authority ===
One of Spilka's first major achievements for her district was the creation of the MetroWest Regional Transit Authority in 2006, one year after being elected to the Massachusetts Senate. Working together with Dennis Giombetti, a selectboard member from Framingham, Spilka spearheaded the creation to provide residents of the region greater access to public transportation.

=== Life sciences ===
Spilka has been a noted supporter of biotechnology. Prior to becoming Senate President, she chaired the Biotech Legislative Caucus and has been recognized for her dedicated work to advance the biotechnology industry in Massachusetts. According to the Biotechnology Industry Organization, her efforts to include life sciences and the medical technology industry in the state's economic development initiatives have worked to "foster a pro-business and pro-biotechnology environment in Massachusetts". Spilka is also a founder and former Chair of the Tech Hub Caucus.

== 2013 Congressional Campaign ==
Spilka was a candidate in the 2013 special election to succeed U.S. Representative Ed Markey of Massachusetts's 5th congressional district, who resigned in June 2013 to take a seat in the U.S. Senate. The primary election was held on October 15, 2013, and Katherine Clark won the Democratic nomination.

== Massachusetts Senate President (2018–present) ==
On July 26, 2018, Spilka was unanimously elected by the members of the Massachusetts Senate to serve as the President of the Senate, making her the third woman to hold this office. Following a tumultuous period in the Massachusetts Senate, Spilka was regarded by her colleagues as a source of stability and a more collaborative leader than previous Senate Presidents.

=== Education ===
Spilka has been described as “The Education President” by her colleagues. Since becoming Senate President, she has led the Senate to reform and boost funding for every level of public education in Massachusetts.

==== Universal free community college ====
In her inaugural speech to the Senate in 2023, Spilka announced her plan to make community college free for Massachusetts residents, beginning in the 2023-2024 legislative session. Several months later Spilka delivered the first part of that plan, MassReconnect, in the Senate’s budget, which made community college free for residents 25 and older, and all nursing students, to help address the healthcare shortage in Massachusetts.

The following year, Spilka pushed to make community college free for all residents. The plan, one of the most comprehensive universal college in the country, was included in the Senate’s budget and the Governor signed it into law in 2024.

In the first year of the program, community college enrollment spiked for the first time in over a decade, seeing a 14 percent increase, with nearly 10,000 new students enrolling in the state's community college system.

==== K-12 funding and the Student Opportunity Act ====
Upon becoming Senate President, Spilka's first priority was the passage of the Student Opportunity Act. This law included the largest increase in education funding in Massachusetts’ history.

=== Senate reforms ===
Spilka has instituted a number of reforms to the Senate aimed at retaining staff and making the Senate reflect Massachusetts' diversity. In 2020 she banned the use of nondisclosure agreements in the Senate, the first branch of Massachusetts government to do so.

In 2023, she created a fellowship program to pay student workers for the first time in the Legislature's history. The program pays students from "underserved populations" $20 an hour for work in Senate offices.

Spilka increased staff salaries by 6% in 2021, 10% in 2022, and again in 2024. In addition to raising salaries, the 2024 reforms standardized rates across offices, created a career ladder, and boosted pay for staff who speak languages besides English.

=== Racial justice and police reform ===
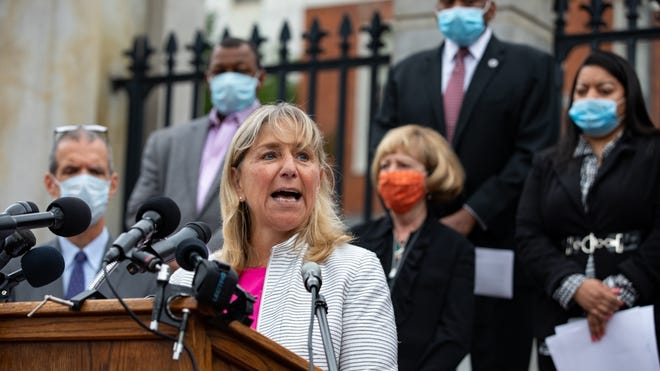
Karen Spilka announces new police reform legislation in July 2020.

In the wake of the murder of George Floyd, Spilka announced the creation of a racial justice advisory group led by Massachusetts Senators Sonia Chang-Diaz and William Brownsberger to draft legislation in response to police brutality, which was subsequently passed and signed into law by Governor Charlie Baker.

In recognition of these and other actions to advance equity and racial justice in Massachusetts, Spilka was awarded the Chaney Goodman Schwerner Advocacy Award by the New England Area Conference of the NAACP in 2020.

=== Transparency ===
Spilka has pushed for the Senate's business to be more available to the public. She changed Senate committee hearings from in-person only, to being broadcast live online, made Senate committee votes public, and made all testimony to committees public. In her opening speech in January 2025, she said the Senate would go further, making Senators' votes in joint committees public, and that the Senate would provide summaries of all bills coming to the Senate floor. These new transparency measures were agreed to in July 2025.

=== Juvenile justice ===
In 2013, Spilka led the successful effort to raise the age of juvenile jurisdiction from 17 to 18, placing nonviolent offenders in education and rehabilitation programs instead of prisons.

Spilka has led the Senate's effort to raise the age of incarceration from 18 to 21, citing statistics that show that people under 21 are less likely to be repeat offenders if they are not incarcerated. Notwithstanding support from judges in Massachusetts, the Boston Celtics, and the New England Patriots, such measures have failed.

== Personal life ==
Spilka is a longtime resident of Ashland, Massachusetts. She is married to Joel Loitherstein, an environmental engineer. She has three children. For many years, Spilka was the legal guardian of her youngest sister, Susie, who had Down syndrome. Susie died of Alzheimer's disease in 2017 at the age of 58. She is Jewish.

Spilka is a well-known dog lover. In 2014, she adopted Lincoln, a pit-bull mix rescue, at the State House during the MSPCA Animal Lobby Day. Her love for Lincoln has made her vocally opposed to stereotypes around pit-bulls. When the Senate passed legislation in 2024 getting rid of certain breed restrictions, she noted, "A dog’s breed has nothing to do with their behavior, and every breed of dog can love a family unconditionally, the way Lincoln loves my family."

Political offices
Preceded by Harriette L. Chandler	President of the Massachusetts Senate; 2018–present	Incumbent
