= James T. Welch =

American politician

Jim Welch
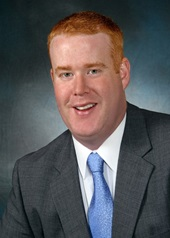

Member of the Massachusetts Senate from the Hampden district
- In office January 5, 2011 – January 5, 2021
- Preceded by: Stephen J. Buoniconti
- Succeeded by: Adam Gomez

Member of the Massachusetts House of Representatives from the 6th Hampden district
- In office 2005–2011
- Preceded by: Stephen J. Buoniconti
- Succeeded by: Michael Finn

Personal details
- Born: December 22, 1975 (age 50) Springfield, Massachusetts, U.S.
- Party: Democratic
- Education: Westfield State College
- Occupation: Realtor; Politician
- Website: http://jimwelch.com/

James T. Welch (born December 22, 1975, in Springfield, Massachusetts) was a Democratic member of the Massachusetts Senate from the Hampden district, who was first elected to this position in 2010. Prior to this he was the Massachusetts State Representative for the 6th Hampden district, which includes his hometown of West Springfield and parts of Springfield and Chicopee. He served in the House from 2005 to 2011. Prior to serving in the Massachusetts legislature, he was a realtor and member of the West Springfield City Council.

Welch lost his re-election bid for a sixth term in the 2020 Democratic primary to Springfield City Councilor Adam Gomez.

== See also ==
- 2019–2020 Massachusetts legislature
