= Anne Gobi =

American politician

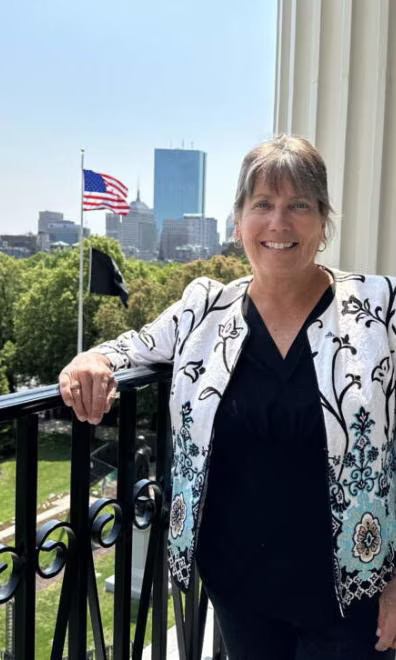

Director of Rural Affairs of Massachusetts
- Incumbent
- Assumed office June 5, 2023
- Preceded by: office established

Member of the Massachusetts Senate from the Worcester and Hampshire district
- In office January 4, 2023 – June 4, 2023
- Preceded by: Constituency established
- Succeeded by: Peter Durant

Member of the Massachusetts Senate from the Worcester, Hampden, Hampshire and Middlesex district
- In office January 7, 2015 – January 3, 2023
- Preceded by: Stephen Brewer
- Succeeded by: Constituency eliminated

Member of the Massachusetts House of Representatives from the 5th Worcester District
- In office October 2001 – January 7, 2015
- Succeeded by: Donnie Berthiaume

Personal details
- Party: Democratic

Anne M. Gobi is a former American state legislator who served in the Massachusetts Senate from January 2015 to June 2023. She previously served in the Massachusetts House of Representatives. Gobi currently serves as Governor Maura Healey's Director of Rural Affairs.

== Political career ==
=== Massachusetts House of Representatives ===
She is a Spencer resident and a member of the Democratic Party. Gobi became a member of the Spencer Democratic Town Committee in 1998. She was first elected to the state House in an October 2001 special election. While a member of the Massachusetts House of Representatives, Gobi worked on multiple committees; including the Joint Committee on Environment and Natural Resources. She served as co-chair of the Committee on Agriculture. From 2001 to 2014, Gobi served in the House, being re-elected six times; 2002, 2004, 2006, 2008, 2010 and 2012.

=== Massachusetts Senate ===
In 2014, Gobi narrowly defeated Republican Mike Valanzola 50.3% to 49.6%. She was elected to the state Senate and was sworn in on January 7, 2015. She succeeded retiring Democrat Stephen Brewer. In the Senate, Gobi served as the Senate Co-chair of the Joint Committee on Environment, Natural Resources and Agriculture and Joint Committee on Higher Education.

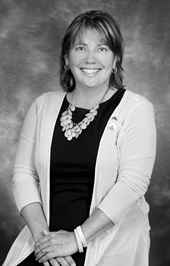
Official portrait of Senator Gobi

=== Massachusetts Director of Rural Affairs ===
On June 5, 2023, Gobi was appointed by Governor Maura Healey to serve as Massachusetts' first Director of Rural Affairs. Just a month after Gobi took office, floods devastated farms across Western Massachusetts; causing nearly $15 million in damages.

== See also ==
- 2019–2020 Massachusetts legislature
- 2021–2022 Massachusetts legislature
- 2020 Massachusetts Senate election
