= Michael Brady (politician) =

American politician

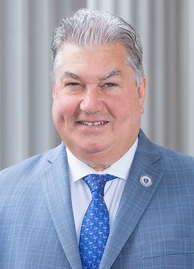

Member of the Massachusetts Senate from the Second Plymouth and Norfolk district
- Incumbent
- Assumed office November 3, 2015
- Preceded by: Thomas P. Kennedy

Member of the Massachusetts House of Representatives from the 9th Plymouth district
- In office January 6, 2009 – November 3, 2015
- Succeeded by: Gerard Cassidy

Personal details
- Born: May 5, 1962 (age 64) Brockton, Massachusetts, U.S.
- Party: Democratic
- Education: Massasoit Community College attended Northeastern University
- Website: Brady's official website

Michael Daniels Brady (born May 5, 1962) is an American politician from Brockton, Massachusetts, who serves as the state legislator in the Massachusetts Senate representing the Second Plymouth & Norfolk District, which covers Brockton, East Bridgewater, Halifax, Hanson and Whitman in the county of Plymouth; portions of Randolph (Precincts 1, 2, 3, 7, 8) and Avon in the county of Norfolk. He is a Brockton resident and a member of the Democratic Party.

== Early life and education ==
Brady was born on May 5, 1962, as the youngest of three children. Brady was educated through the Brockton Public School System and went on to attend Massasoit Community College and Northeastern University. He also attended Brockton High School, and graduated from it in 1980. When he was just ten years old, he was struck and seriously injured by a car. In a coma for a week, he spent three months in the hospital, followed by nearly a year of recovery at home. Senator Ted Kennedy and President Richard Nixon both sent their condolences to Brady and his family.

== Career ==
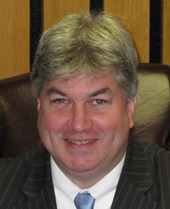
An official portrait of Brady

In 1996, Brady served on the Brockton School Committee until he was elected to the Brockton City Council in 1997, where he served until 2009. In 2008, he was elected to the Massachusetts House of Representatives. After the death of State Senator Thomas P. Kennedy in 2015, Brady was elected to succeed him. In his first term as a State Senator, Brady chaired the Committee on Election Laws. He currently is the chair of the Joint Committee of Public Service.

== Personal life ==
On March 24, 2018, Brady was taken into custody on suspicion of operating under the influence of alcohol, a marked lanes violation, and negligent operation of a motor vehicle in Weymouth, Massachusetts. This was Brady's second OUI incident.

On June 4, 2019, Brady reached a deal with prosecutors to avoid his trial for drunk driving stemming from a March 2018 incident. He served probation for one year, lost his driver's license for a period of 45 days, paid $600 in court fees and fines, and attended an alcohol education program.

Brady admitted that the state of Massachusetts had a preponderance of evidence to convict him, but avoided a guilty plea. The state agreed to drop charges in a year if Brady successfully complied with the terms of his probation.

On November 15, 2019, the Massachusetts Senate Ethics Committee stripped Brady of his post as Senate chairman of the Committee on Public Service. This punishment reduced his pay by $15,000 per year. The committee allowed Brady to keep his vice-chairmanship on the Committee on Tourism, Arts and Cultural Development, which has a stipend of $5,200 per year. The committee also recommended Brady "seek out and receive professional evaluation and appropriate treatment."

== See also ==
- 2019–2020 Massachusetts legislature
- 2021–2022 Massachusetts legislature
