= Jason Lewis (Massachusetts politician) =

American politician

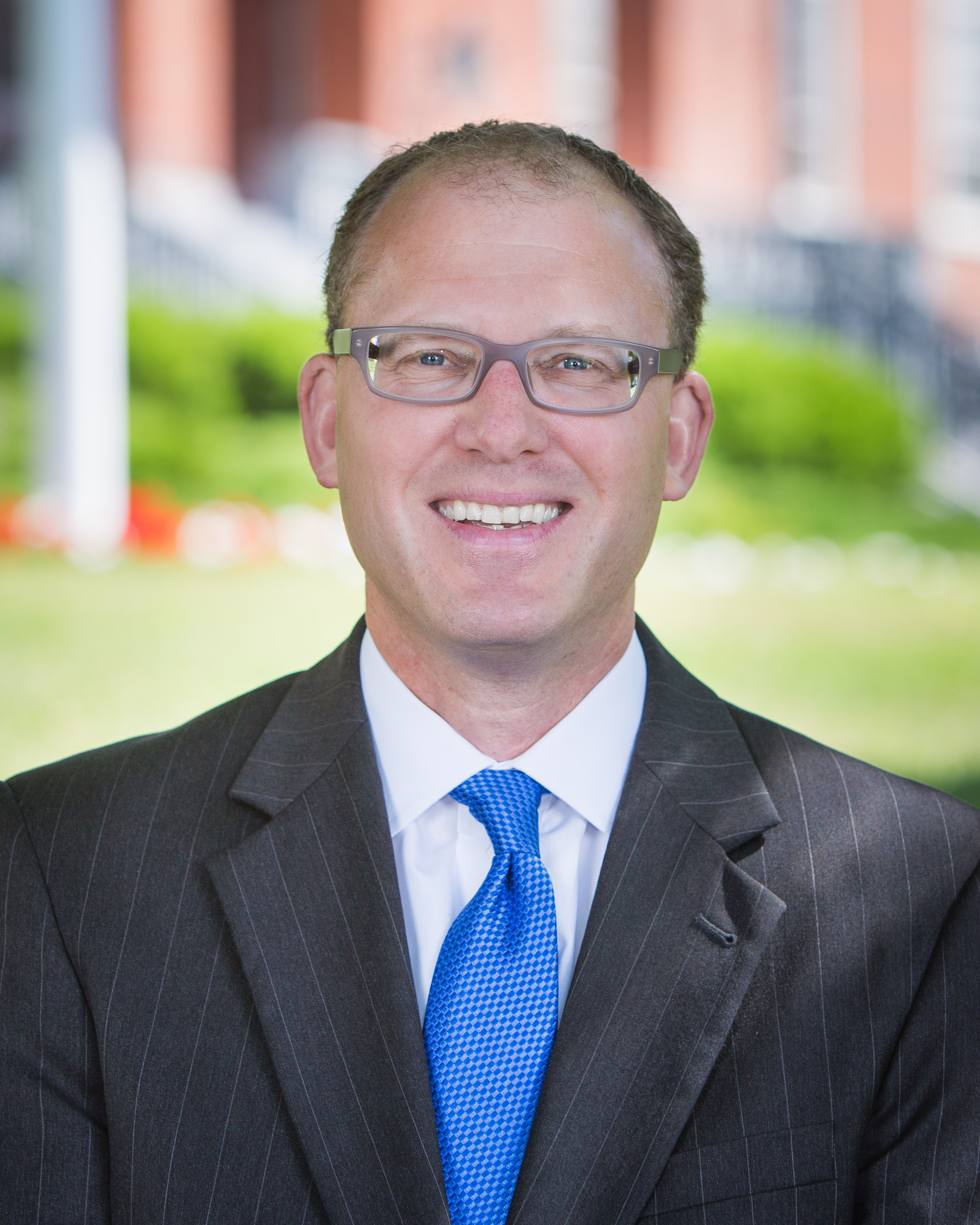

Member of the Massachusetts Senate from the 5th Middlesex district
- Incumbent
- Assumed office April 16, 2014
- Preceded by: Katherine Clark

Member of the Massachusetts House of Representatives from the 31st Middlesex district
- In office January 7, 2009 – April 16, 2014
- Succeeded by: Mike Day

Personal details
- Born: April 19, 1968 (age 58) South Africa
- Party: Democratic
- Education: Harvard University

Jason M. Lewis (born April 19, 1968) is an American state legislator elected in April 2014 to the Massachusetts Senate, representing the 5th Middlesex District. He is a Winchester resident and a member of the Democratic Party. From January 2009 to April 2014 he represented the 31st Middlesex district in the Massachusetts House of Representatives.

Born in apartheid South Africa, Lewis moved to the U.S. at the age of 12. He won an April 2014 special election to succeed Katherine Clark in the Massachusetts Senate, first having won the March 2014 Democratic primary, and has continued to serve as state Senator since. In 2026, Lewis announced that he was retiring from the state Senate at the end of 2026.

As state Senator, Lewis helped raise the minimum age for purchasing tobacco from 18 to 21, and was one of the main negotiators in 2018 on a law that increased the minimum wage to $15 and created a state program for paid family and medical leave.

== Personal life ==
He is Jewish.

== See also ==
- 2019–2020 Massachusetts legislature
- 2021–2022 Massachusetts legislature
