= 2005–2006 Massachusetts legislature =

184th Massachusetts General Court
←	183rd	185th	→
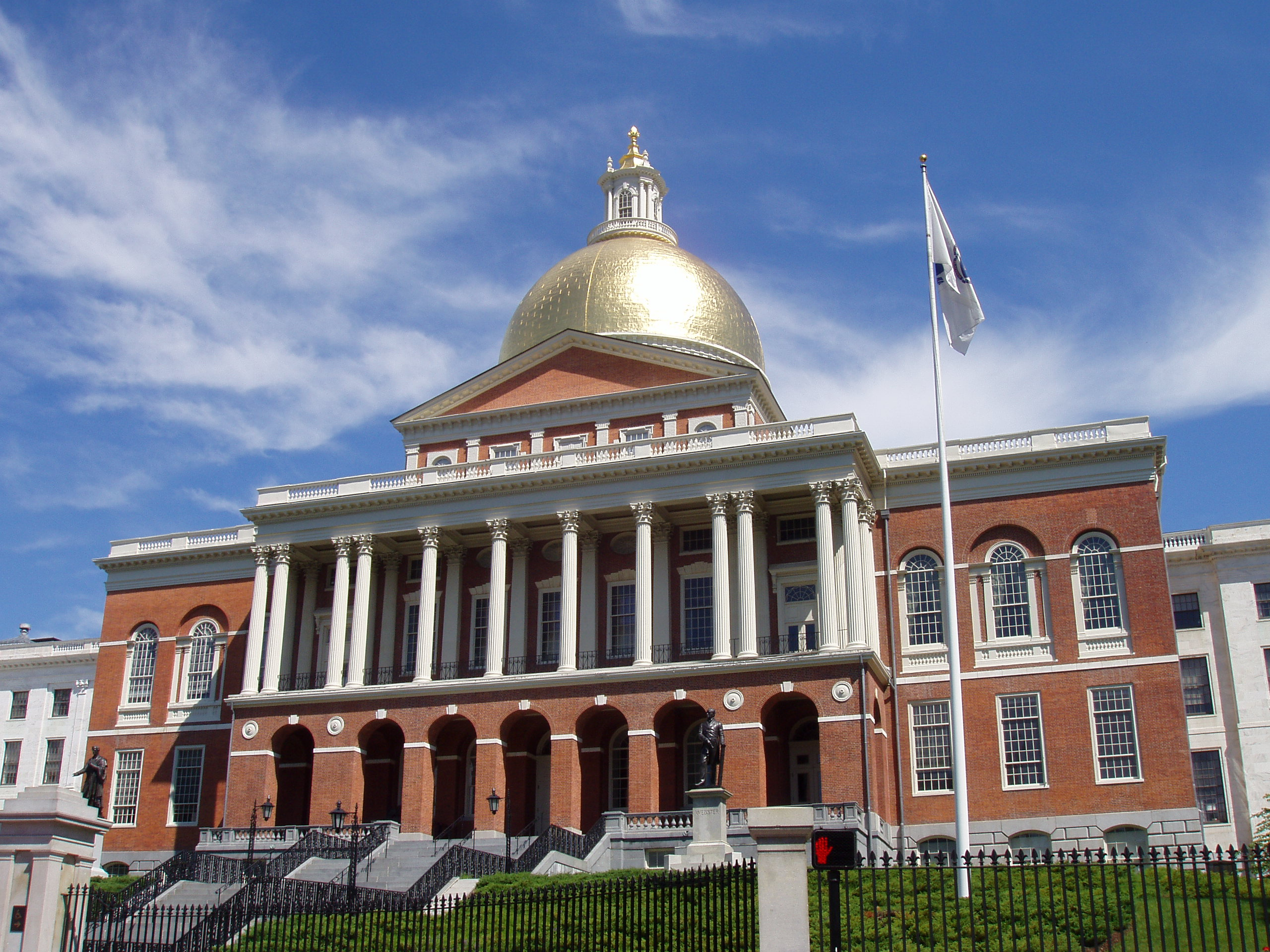
- Massachusetts State House in 2005

Overview
- Legislative body: General Court
- Term: January 5, 2005 – January 2, 2007
- Election: 2004 Senate election, 2004 House election
- Website: mass.gov/legis/legis.htm

Senate
- Members: 40
- President: Robert Travaglini
- Majority Leader: Frederick Berry
- Majority Whip: Joan Menard
- Minority Leader: Brian Lees
- Minority Whip: Bruce Tarr
- Party control: Democrat

House
- Members: 160
- Speaker: Salvatore DiMasi
- Majority Leader: John H. Rogers
- Majority Whip: Lida E. Harkins
- Minority Leader: Bradley Jones Jr.
- Minority Whip: George N. Peterson Jr.
- Party control: Democrat

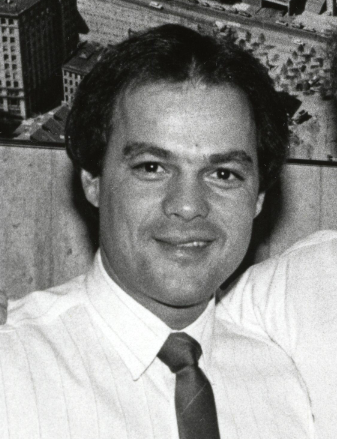
Robert Travaglini, Senate president.

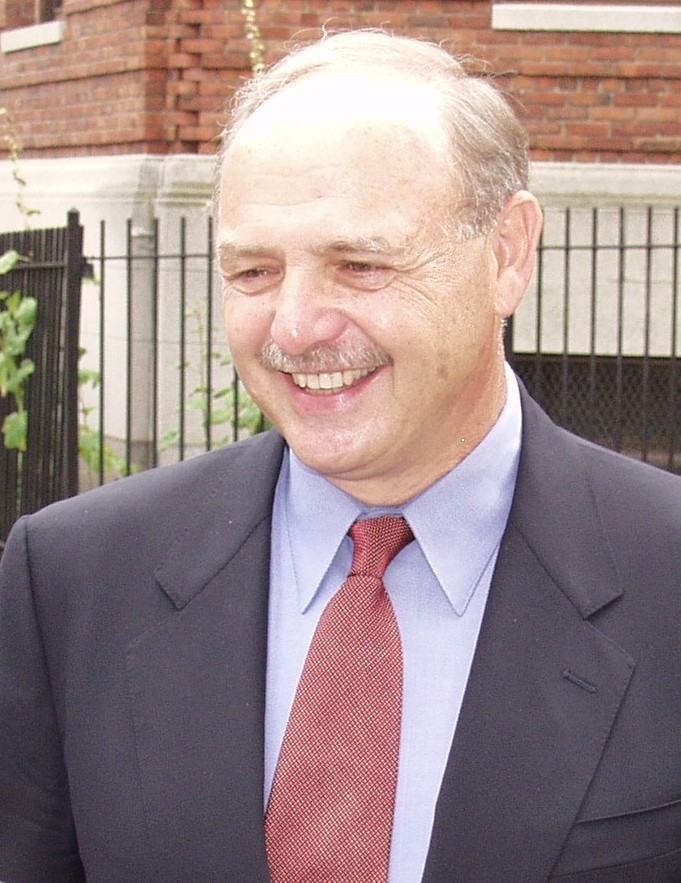
Salvatore DiMasi, House speaker.

Leaders of the Massachusetts General Court, 2005.

The 184th Massachusetts General Court, consisting of the Massachusetts Senate and the Massachusetts House of Representatives, met in 2005 and 2006 during the governorship of Mitt Romney. Robert Travaglini served as president of the Senate and Salvatore DiMasi served as speaker of the House.

== Senators ==
portrait	name	date of birth	district
	Robert A. Antonioni	July 15, 1958	
	Edward M. Augustus Jr.	March 31, 1964	2nd Worcester
	Steven Baddour	1969	
	Jarrett Barrios	October 16, 1969	
	Frederick Berry	December 20, 1949	
	Stephen Brewer	February 10, 1948	
	Scott Brown (politician)	September 12, 1959	
	Stephen Buoniconti	September 4, 1969	
	Harriette L. Chandler	December 20, 1937	
	Robert Creedon	November 13, 1942	
	Cynthia Stone Creem	September 17, 1942	
	Susan Fargo	August 27, 1942	
	Jack Hart (state senator)	April 21, 1961	
	Robert Havern III	July 17, 1949	
	Robert L. Hedlund	July 12, 1961	
	Patricia D. Jehlen	October 14, 1943	
	Brian A. Joyce	September 5, 1962	
	Michael Knapik	February 11, 1963	
	Brian Lees	July 25, 1953	
	Thomas M. McGee	December 15, 1955	
	Joan Menard	September 6, 1935	
	Mark Montigny	June 20, 1961	
	Richard T. Moore	August 7, 1943	
	Michael W. Morrissey	August 2, 1954	
	Therese Murray	October 10, 1947	
	Andrea F. Nuciforo Jr.	February 26, 1964	
	Robert O'Leary	January 24, 1946	
	Marc Pacheco	October 29, 1952	
	Steven C. Panagiotakos	November 26, 1959	
	Pam Resor	1942	
	Stan Rosenberg	October 12, 1949	
	Karen Spilka	January 11, 1953	
	Bruce Tarr	January 2, 1964	
	James E. Timilty		
	Richard Tisei	August 13, 1962	
	Steven Tolman	October 2, 1954	
	Robert Travaglini	July 20, 1952	
	Susan Tucker (politician)	November 7, 1944	
	Marian Walsh	1954	
	Dianne Wilkerson	May 2, 1955	

== Representatives ==
portrait	name	date of birth	district
	Cory Atkins	February 10, 1949	14th Middlesex
	Demetrius Atsalis	March 31, 1964	
	Bruce Ayers	April 17, 1962	
	Ruth Balser	October 30, 1948	
	John Binienda	June 22, 1947	
	Deborah Blumer	October 18, 1941	
	Daniel E. Bosley	December 9, 1953	
	Garrett Bradley	July 4, 1970	
	Arthur Broadhurst	September 28, 1964	
	Antonio Cabral	January 26, 1955	
	Jennifer Callahan	August 24, 1964	
	Christine Canavan	January 25, 1950	
	Gale D. Candaras	1949	
	Stephen Canessa	1980	
	Mark Carron	July 8, 1962	
	Paul Casey	February 26, 1961	
	Cheryl Coakley-Rivera	February 21, 1964	
	Edward G. Connolly	August 22, 1928	
	Michael J. Coppola	December 7, 1942	
	Robert Correia	January 3, 1939	
	Michael A. Costello	May 5, 1965	
	Robert K. Coughlin	April 22, 1969	
	Geraldine Creedon	September 26, 1945	
	Sean Curran (politician)	August 23, 1977	
	Robert DeLeo (politician)	March 27, 1950	
	Vinny deMacedo	October 16, 1965	
	Brian Dempsey (politician)	September 30, 1966	
	Salvatore DiMasi	August 11, 1945	
	Paul Donato	October 27, 1941	
	Christopher Donelan	December 25, 1964	
	Joseph R. Driscoll	1970	
	Jamie Eldridge	August 11, 1973	
	Lewis Evangelidis	July 11, 1961	
	James H. Fagan	October 13, 1947	
	Christopher Fallon	June 7, 1953	
	Mark Falzone	June 14, 1975	
	Robert Fennell	June 26, 1956	
	Mike Festa	May 9, 1954	
	Barry Finegold	March 3, 1971	
	Jennifer Flanagan	September 5, 1975	
	Marie St. Fleur	May 4, 1962	
	David Lawrence Flynn	February 5, 1933	
	Linda Dorcena Forry	November 1, 1973	
	Gloria Fox	March 18, 1942	
	John Fresolo	October 11, 1964	
	Paul Frost	April 25, 1970	
	William C. Galvin	October 18, 1956	
	Colleen Garry	July 21, 1962	
	Susan Williams Gifford	November 3, 1959	
	Anne Gobi	December 27, 1962	
	Emile Goguen	March 16, 1933	
	Thomas Golden Jr.	March 5, 1971	
	Shirley Gomes	January 23, 1940	
	Mary E. Grant	January 10, 1953	
	William G. Greene Jr.	April 24, 1940	
	Denis Guyer	July 11, 1966	
	Patricia Haddad	May 7, 1950	
	Geoff Hall (politician)	October 10, 1948	
	Robert S. Hargraves	October 14, 1936	
	Lida E. Harkins	January 24, 1944	
	Shirley Owens Hicks	April 22, 1942	
	Bradford Hill	January 22, 1967	
	Kevin Honan	June 5, 1958	
	Donald Humason Jr.	July 31, 1967	
	Frank Hynes	December 23, 1940	
	Patricia D. Jehlen	October 14, 1943	
	Bradley Jones Jr.	January 9, 1965	
	Louis Kafka	November 28, 1945	
	Michael F. Kane	June 10, 1967	
	Rachel Kaprielian	June 24, 1968	
	Jay R. Kaufman	May 4, 1947	
	Daniel F. Keenan	February 15, 1961	
	John D. Keenan	April 4, 1965	
	Thomas P. Kennedy	August 15, 1951	
	Kay Khan	June 22, 1941	
	Brian Knuuttila	February 22, 1957	
	Peter Kocot	September 18, 1956	
	Robert Koczera	November 25, 1953	
	Peter Koutoujian	September 17, 1961	
	Paul Kujawski	August 26, 1953	
	Stephen Kulik	August 3, 1950	
	Barbara L'Italien	January 3, 1961	
	William Lantigua	February 19, 1955	
	Peter J. Larkin	December 23, 1953	
	James Leary	March 27, 1967	
	Stephen LeDuc	February 29, 1968	
	John Lepper	December 22, 1934	
	David Linsky	October 16, 1957	
	Paul Loscocco	March 7, 1962	
	Liz Malia	September 30, 1949	
	Ronald Mariano	October 31, 1946	
	Jim Marzilli	May 8, 1958	
	Jim Miceli	March 25, 1935	
	Michael Moran (Massachusetts politician)	February 23, 1971	
	Charles A. Murphy	August 11, 1965	
	James M. Murphy	November 15, 1969	
	Kevin J. Murphy (politician)	November 27, 1952	
	Patrick Natale	September 22, 1968	
	Harold Naughton Jr.	July 4, 1960	
	Robert Nyman	August 20, 1960	
	Thomas J. O'Brien (Massachusetts politician)	March 15, 1964	
	Eugene O'Flaherty	July 20, 1968	
	Marie Parente	May 22, 1928	
	Matthew Patrick (politician)	April 1, 1952	
	Anne Paulsen	August 8, 1936	
	Vincent Pedone	March 15, 1967	
	Alice Peisch	October 4, 1954	
	Jeff Perry (politician)	January 8, 1964	
	Douglas W. Petersen	March 7, 1948	
	George N. Peterson Jr.	July 8, 1950	
	Thomas Petrolati	March 16, 1957	
	Anthony Petruccelli	October 2, 1972	
	William "Smitty" Pignatelli	August 31, 1959	
	Elizabeth Poirier	October 27, 1942	
	Karyn Polito	November 11, 1966	
	Susan W. Pope	October 9, 1942	
	John F. Quinn	April 7, 1963	
	Kathi-Anne Reinstein	January 31, 1971	
	Michael Rodrigues (politician)	May 30, 1959	
	Mary Rogeness	May 18, 1941	
	John H. Rogers	October 22, 1964	
	Richard J. Ross	July 6, 1954	
	Mike Rush	November 30, 1973	
	Byron Rushing	July 29, 1942	
	Jeffrey Sanchez (politician)	July 18, 1969	
	Tom Sannicandro	March 22, 1956	
	Angelo Scaccia	September 29, 1942	
	John Scibak	May 4, 1953	
	Carl Sciortino	July 6, 1978	
	Frank Smizik	September 4, 1944	
	Todd Smola	1977	
	Theodore C. Speliotis	August 20, 1953	
	Robert Spellane	March 5, 1970	
	Christopher Speranzo	October 24, 1972	
	Joyce Spiliotis	December 27, 1946	
	Harriett Stanley	March 30, 1950	
	Thomas M. Stanley	March 23, 1964	
	Ellen Story	October 17, 1941	
	William M. Straus	June 26, 1956	
	David B. Sullivan	June 6, 1953	
	Benjamin Swan	September 18, 1933	
	Kathleen Teahan	June 11, 1947	
	Walter Timilty	July 19, 1969	
	A. Stephen Tobin	July 3, 1956	
	Timothy J. Toomey Jr.	June 7, 1953	
	David Torrisi	September 18, 1968	
	Philip Travis	July 2, 1940	
	Eric Turkington	August 12, 1947	
	Cleon Turner	December 29, 1945	
	James E. Vallee	July 24, 1966	
	Anthony Verga	April 26, 1935	
	Joseph Wagner (Massachusetts politician)	May 7, 1960	
	Brian P. Wallace	July 26, 1949	
	Patricia Walrath	August 11, 1941	
	Marty Walsh	April 10, 1967	
	Steven Walsh	September 11, 1973	
	Martha M. Walz	July 7, 1961	
	Daniel K. Webster	April 2, 1964	
	James T. Welch	December 22, 1975	
	Alice Wolf	December 24, 1933	

== See also ==
- 2004 Massachusetts Senate election
- Massachusetts health care reform, 2005-2006 legislation
- 2006 Massachusetts gubernatorial election
- 2006 Massachusetts ballot measures
- 109th United States Congress
- List of Massachusetts General Courts

== Images ==
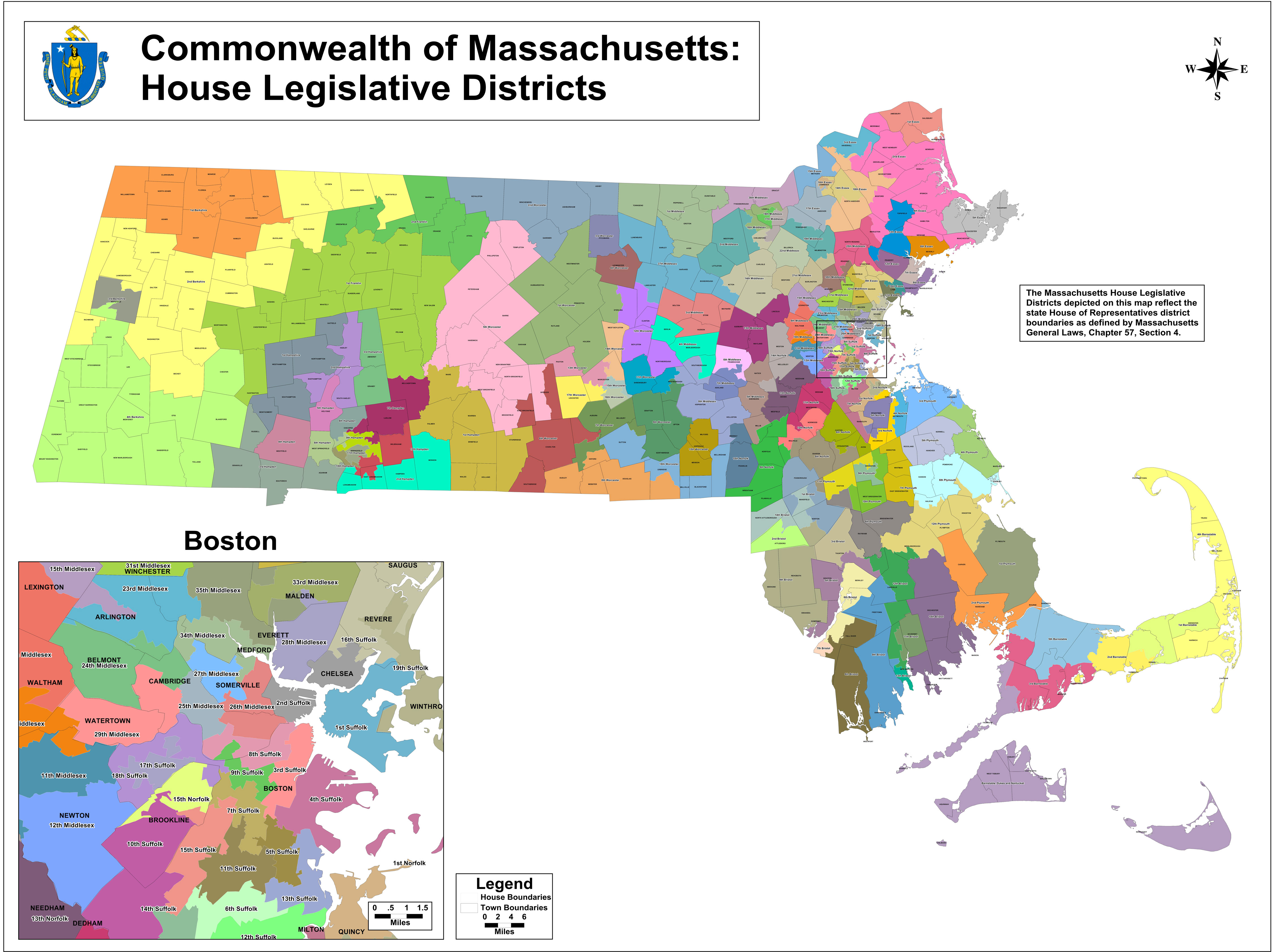
Map of districts of the Massachusetts House of Representatives, 2004
