= 2001–2002 Massachusetts legislature =

182nd Massachusetts General Court
←	181st	183rd	→

Overview
- Legislative body: General Court
- Term: January 3, 2001 – December 31, 2002

Senate
- Members: 40
- President: Tom Birmingham
- Majority Leader: Linda Melconian
- Majority Whip: Robert Travaglini
- Minority Leader: Brian Lees
- Minority Whip: Richard Tisei
- Party control: Democratic

House
- Members: 160
- Speaker: Thomas Finneran
- Majority Leader: William P. Nagle Jr.
- Majority Whip: Salvatore DiMasi
- Minority Leader: Francis L. Marini (2001–2002); Bradley Jones Jr. (2002)
- Minority Whip: George N. Peterson Jr.
- Party control: Democratic

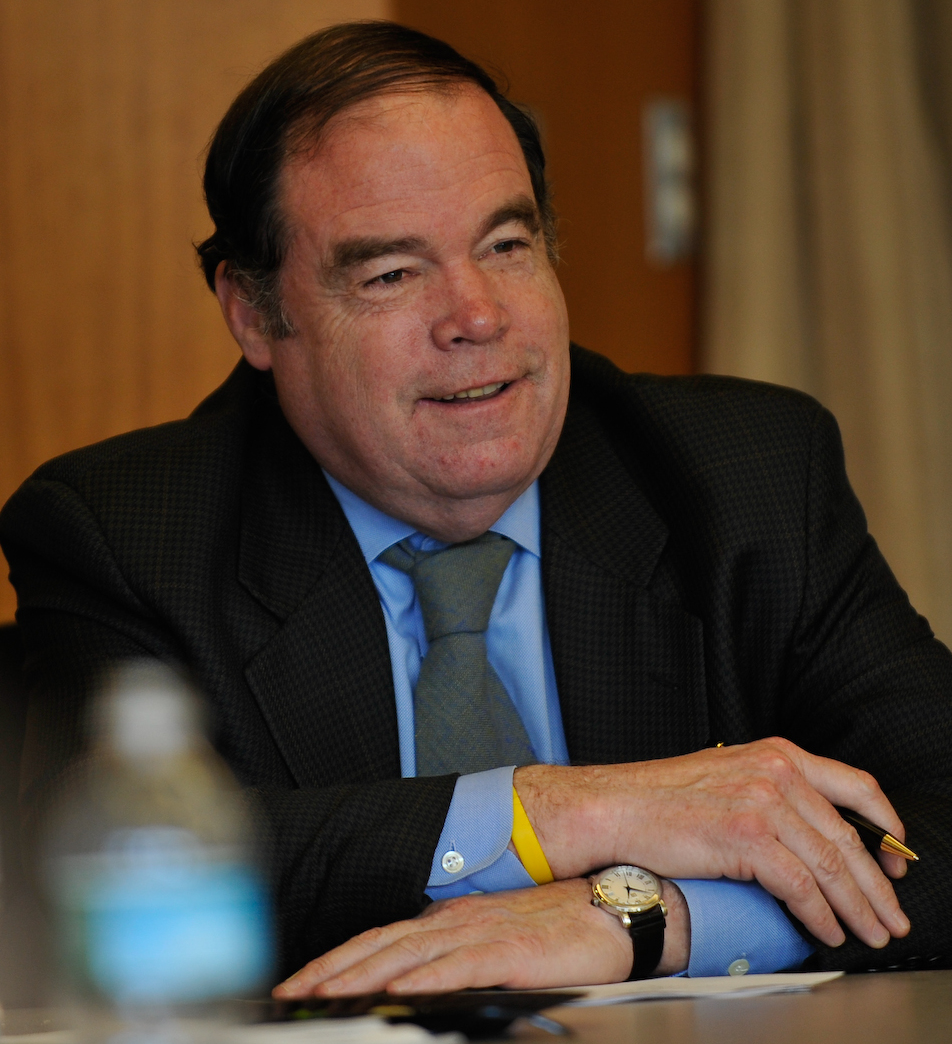
Tom Birmingham, Senate president.

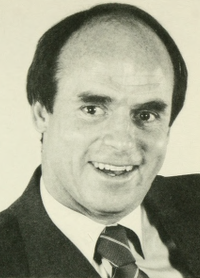
Thomas Finneran, House speaker.

Leaders of the Massachusetts General Court, 2001-2002.

The 182nd Massachusetts General Court, consisting of the Massachusetts Senate and the Massachusetts House of Representatives, met in 2001 and 2002 during the governorships of Paul Cellucci and Jane Swift. Tom Birmingham served as president of the Senate and Thomas Finneran served as speaker of the House.

== Senators ==
portrait	name	date of birth	district
	Robert A. Antonioni	July 15, 1958	
	Frederick Berry	December 20, 1949	2nd Essex
	Tom Birmingham	August 4, 1949	
	Stephen Brewer	February 10, 1948	
	Harriette L. Chandler	December 20, 1937	
	Edward J. Clancy Jr.	June 30, 1950	
	Robert Creedon	November 13, 1942	
	Cynthia Stone Creem	September 17, 1942	
	Susan Fargo	August 27, 1942	
	Guy Glodis	February 15, 1969	
	Robert Havern III	July 17, 1949	
	Robert L. Hedlund	July 12, 1961	
	Cheryl Jacques	February 17, 1962	
	James Jajuga	December 12, 1946	
	Brian A. Joyce	September 5, 1962	
	Michael Knapik	February 11, 1963	
	Brian Lees	July 25, 1953	
	Stephen F. Lynch	March 31, 1955	
	David P. Magnani	May 24, 1944	
	Linda Melconian		
	Joan Menard	September 6, 1935	
	Mark Montigny	June 20, 1961	
	Richard T. Moore	August 7, 1943	
	Michael W. Morrissey	August 2, 1954	
	Therese Murray	October 10, 1947	
	Andrea F. Nuciforo Jr.	February 26, 1964	
	Robert O'Leary	January 24, 1946	
	Marc Pacheco	October 29, 1952	
	Steven C. Panagiotakos	November 26, 1959	
	Pam Resor	1942	
	Stan Rosenberg	October 12, 1949	
	Charles E. Shannon Jr.	August 31, 1943	
	Jo Ann Sprague	November 3, 1931	
	Bruce Tarr	January 2, 1964	
	Richard Tisei	August 13, 1962	
	Steven Tolman	October 2, 1954	
	Robert Travaglini	July 20, 1952	
	Susan Tucker (politician)	November 7, 1944	
	Marian Walsh	1954	
	Dianne Wilkerson	May 2, 1955	

== Representatives ==
portrait	name	date of birth	district
	Christopher P. Asselin	March 10, 1969	9th Hampden
	Cory Atkins	February 10, 1949	
	Demetrius Atsalis	March 31, 1964	
	Bruce Ayers	April 17, 1962	
	Ruth Balser	October 30, 1948	
	Jarrett Barrios	October 16, 1969	
	John Binienda	June 22, 1947	
	Deborah Blumer	October 18, 1941	
	Daniel E. Bosley	December 9, 1953	
	Garrett Bradley	July 4, 1970	
	Arthur Broadhurst	September 28, 1964	
	Scott Brown (politician)	September 12, 1959	
	David Bunker		
	Stephen Buoniconti	September 4, 1969	
	Antonio Cabral	January 26, 1955	
	Michael P. Cahill	December 12, 1961	
	Christine Canavan	January 25, 1950	
	Gale D. Candaras	1949	
	Paul Caron	November 15, 1955	
	Mark Carron	July 8, 1962	
	Paul C. Casey	February 26, 1961	
	Vincent P. Ciampa	April 15, 1945	
	Carol C. Cleven	November 2, 1928	
	Cheryl Coakley-Rivera	February 21, 1964	
	Edward G. Connolly	August 22, 1928	
	Michael J. Coppola	December 7, 1942	
	Robert Correia	January 3, 1939	
	Geraldine Creedon	September 26, 1945	
	Brian Cresta	April 22, 1969	
	Robert DeLeo (politician)	March 27, 1950	
	Vinny deMacedo	October 16, 1965	
	Paul C. Demakis	July 9, 1953	
	Brian Dempsey (politician)	September 30, 1966	
	Salvatore DiMasi	August 11, 1945	
	Paul Donato	October 27, 1941	
	David Donnelly	June 7, 1956	
	Carol A. Donovan	June 5, 1937	
	James H. Fagan	October 13, 1947	
	Christopher Fallon	June 7, 1953	
	Mark Falzone	June 14, 1975	
	Robert Fennell	June 26, 1956	
	Mike Festa	May 9, 1954	
	Barry Finegold	March 3, 1971	
	Thomas Finneran	January 2, 1950	
	Kevin W. Fitzgerald	1950	
	Nancy Flavin	June 26, 1950	
	Marie St. Fleur	May 4, 1962	
	David Lawrence Flynn	February 5, 1933	
	Gloria Fox	March 18, 1942	
	John Fresolo	October 11, 1964	
	Paul Frost	April 25, 1970	
	William C. Galvin	October 18, 1956	
	Colleen Garry	July 21, 1962	
	Thomas N. George	May 2, 1938	
	Emile Goguen	March 16, 1933	
	Brian Paul Golden	February 2, 1965	
	Thomas Golden Jr.	March 5, 1971	
	Shirley Gomes	January 23, 1940	
	William G. Greene Jr.	April 24, 1940	
	Patricia Haddad	May 7, 1950	
	Cele Hahn	March 21, 1942	
	Geoff Hall (politician)	October 10, 1948	
	Robert S. Hargraves	October 14, 1936	
	Lida E. Harkins	January 24, 1944	
	Jack Hart (state senator)	April 21, 1961	
	Shirley Owens-Hicks	April 22, 1942	
	Bradford Hill	January 22, 1967	
	Reed V. Hillman	November 30, 1948	
	Christopher Hodgkins	August 24, 1957	
	Kevin Honan	June 5, 1958	
	Frank Hynes	December 23, 1940	
	Patricia D. Jehlen	October 14, 1943	
	Bradley Jones Jr.	January 9, 1965	
	Louis Kafka	November 28, 1945	
	Michael F. Kane	June 10, 1967	
	Rachel Kaprielian	June 24, 1968	
	Jay R. Kaufman	May 4, 1947	
	Daniel F. Keenan	February 15, 1961	
	Shaun P. Kelly	March 13, 1964	
	Thomas P. Kennedy	August 15, 1951	
	Kay Khan	June 22, 1941	
	Brian Knuuttila	February 22, 1957	
	Robert Koczera	November 25, 1953	
	Peter Koutoujian	September 17, 1961	
	Paul Kujawski	August 26, 1953	
	Stephen Kulik	August 3, 1950	
	Peter J. Larkin	December 23, 1953	
	James Leary	March 27, 1967	
	Stephen P. LeDuc	February 29, 1968	
	John Lepper	December 22, 1934	
	Maryanne Lewis	1963	
	David Linsky	October 16, 1957	
	John A. Locke (Massachusetts politician)	November 27, 1962	
	Paul Loscocco	March 7, 1962	
	Liz Malia	September 30, 1949	
	Ronald Mariano	October 31, 1946	
	Francis L. Marini	March 5, 1949	
	Jim Marzilli	May 8, 1958	
	Thomas M. McGee	December 15, 1955	
	John Merrigan	May 2, 1961	
	Jim Miceli	March 25, 1935	
	Charles A. Murphy	August 11, 1965	
	Kevin J. Murphy (politician)	November 27, 1952	
	William P. Nagle Jr.	June 10, 1951	
	David Nangle	December 18, 1960	
	Harold Naughton Jr.	July 4, 1960	
	Robert Nyman	August 20, 1960	
	Thomas J. O'Brien (Massachusetts politician)	March 15, 1964	
	Eugene O'Flaherty	July 20, 1968	
	Marie Parente	May 22, 1928	
	Matthew Patrick (politician)	April 1, 1952	
	Anne Paulsen	August 8, 1936	
	Vincent Pedone	March 15, 1967	
	Douglas W. Petersen	March 7, 1948	
	George N. Peterson Jr.	July 8, 1950	
	Thomas Petrolati	March 16, 1957	
	Anthony Petruccelli	October 2, 1972	
	Elizabeth Poirier	October 27, 1942	
	Karyn Polito	November 11, 1966	
	Susan W. Pope	October 9, 1942	
	Ruth Provost	August 9, 1949	
	John F. Quinn	April 7, 1963	
	Kathi-Anne Reinstein	January 31, 1971	
	Michael Rodrigues (politician)	May 30, 1959	
	Mary Rogeness	May 18, 1941	
	George Rogers (Massachusetts politician)	August 2, 1933	
	John H. Rogers	October 22, 1964	
	J. Michael Ruane	December 10, 1927	
	Byron Rushing	July 29, 1942	
	Jose L. Santiago		
	Angelo Scaccia	September 29, 1942	
	Mary Jane Simmons	May 14, 1953	
	John P. Slattery	April 5, 1958	
	Frank Smizik	September 4, 1944	
	Theodore C. Speliotis	August 20, 1953	
	Robert Spellane	March 5, 1970	
	Harriett Stanley	March 30, 1950	
	Thomas M. Stanley	March 23, 1964	
	Ellen Story	October 17, 1941	
	William M. Straus	June 26, 1956	
	David B. Sullivan	June 6, 1953	
	Joseph Sullivan (mayor)	March 1, 1959	
	Benjamin Swan	September 18, 1933	
	Kathleen Teahan	June 11, 1947	
	Walter Timilty	July 19, 1969	
	Paul Tirone	February 8, 1951	
	A. Stephen Tobin	July 3, 1956	
	Timothy J. Toomey Jr.	June 7, 1953	
	David Torrisi	September 18, 1968	
	Philip Travis	July 2, 1940	
	Eric Turkington	August 12, 1947	
	James E. Vallee	July 24, 1966	
	Anthony Verga	April 26, 1935	
	Joseph Wagner (Massachusetts politician)	May 7, 1960	
	Patricia Walrath	August 11, 1941	
	Marty Walsh	April 10, 1967	
	Alice Wolf	December 24, 1933	

== See also ==
- 107th United States Congress
- List of Massachusetts General Courts
