= 2006 Massachusetts Senate election =

- November 7, 2006

All 40 seats in the Massachusetts Senate 21 seats needed for a majority
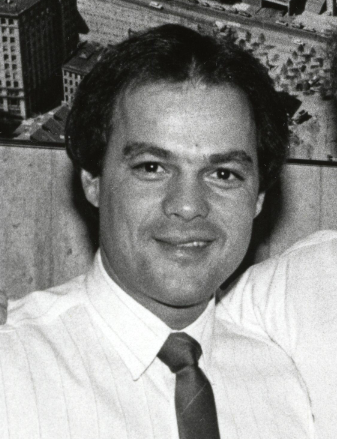

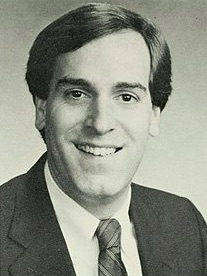
| | Majority party | Minority party |
|---|---|---|
| Leader | Robert Travaglini | Brian Lees (retired) |
| Party | Democratic | Republican |
| Leader since | January 1, 2003 | 1993 |
| Leader's seat | 1st Suffolk and Middlesex | 1st Hampden and Hampshire |
| Last election | 34 seats | 6 seats |
| Seats won | 35 | 5 |
| Seat change | ▲1 | ▼1 |
- Results: Democratic gain Democratic hold Republican hold
President before election
Robert Travaglini
Democratic
Elected President
Robert Travaglini
Democratic

As a result of the Massachusetts general election, 2006, the Democrats picked up one open seat in the Massachusetts State Senate, the only change from the previous session. The current session began in January, 2007, and consists of 35 Democrats and 5 Republicans.

The 2006 Massachusetts House election was held on the same date as the Senate election, as well as Federal and Gubernatorial elections (see Massachusetts general election, 2006).

Twenty-seven of the forty seats were left uncontested by one of the major parties in the 2006 election.

== Results ==
Summary of the November 7, 2006 Massachusetts Senate election results
| Party | Seats | | | Popular Vote | |
| Party | 2004 | 2006 | +/− | Vote | % |
|---|---|---|---|---|---|
| Democratic Party | 34 | 35 | +1 | 1,414,429 | 75.9% |
| Republican Party | 6 | 5 | −1 | 421,781 | 22.6% |
| Independents | 0 | 0 | 0 | 11,720 | 0.6% |
| Green Party | 0 | 0 | 0 | 1,988 | 0.1% |
| Others | 0 | 0 | 0 | 13,886 | 0.7% |
| Total | 40 | 40 | 0 | 1,863,804 | 100% |

== Predictions ==
| Source | Ranking | As of |
|---|---|---|
| Rothenberg | Safe D | November 4, 2006 |

== Overview ==
Official results from State Election Results 2006 (PDF, 340 kB) on the Massachusetts Elections Division website

| District | Incumbent | Status | Competing candidates | 2006 Result | % |
|---|---|---|---|---|---|
| Berkshire, Hampshire and Franklin | Andrea Nuciforo, Jr. (D-Pittsfield) | retired to run for Middle Berkshire Register of Deeds | Benjamin Downing (D-Pittsfield)*; Matthew W. Kinnaman (R-Lee); Dion Robbins-Zust (G-Richmond) | 37,763; 13,595; 1,988 | 70.8% 25.5% 3.7% |
| Bristol and Norfolk | James Timility (D-Walpole) | sought re-election | James Timility (D-Walpole); Michael Atwill (R-Mansfield) | 34,702; 22,865 | 60.5% 39.8% |
| 1st Bristol and Plymouth | Joan Menard (D-Somerset) | sought re-election | Joan Menard (D-Somerset); Unopposed | 39,235 | 99.2% |
| 2nd Bristol and Plymouth | Mark Montigny (D-New Bedford) | sought re-election | Mark Montigny (D-New Bedford); Raimundo Delgado (U-New Bedford) | 37,547; 8,104 | 82.1% 17.7% |
| Cape and Islands | Robert O'Leary (D-Barnstable) | sought re-election | Robert O'Leary (D-Barnstable); Ricardo Barros (R-Centerville)* | 48,212; 27,918 | 63.3% 36.7% |
| 1st Essex | Steven Baddour (D-Methuen) | sought re-election | Steven Baddour (D-Methuen); Unopposed | 43,437 | 98.7% |
| 2nd Essex | Frederick Berry (D-Peabody) | sought re-election | Frederick Berry (D-Peabody); Unopposed | 48,662 | 99.0% |
| 1st Essex and Middlesex | Bruce Tarr (R-Gloucester) | sought re-election | Bruce Tarr (R-Gloucester); Unopposed | 56,605 | 99.1% |
| 2nd Essex and Middlesex | Susan Tucker (D-Andover) | sought re-election | Susan Tucker (D-Andover); Unopposed | 35,991 | 99.0% |
| 3rd Essex and Middlesex | Thomas M. McGee (D-Lynn) | sought re-election | Thomas M. McGee (D-Lynn); Unopposed | 38,229 | 99.1% |
| Hampden | Stephen Buoniconti (D-West Springfield) | sought re-election | Stephen Buoniconti (D-West Springfield); Unopposed | 29,515 | 99.0% |
| 1st Hampden and Hampshire | Brian Lees (R-East Longmeadow) | retired to run for Hampden County Clerk of Courts | Enrico John Villamaino III (R-East Longmeadow)*; Gale D. Candaras (D-Wilbraham)* | 20,465; 30,366 | 40.2% 59.6% |
| 2nd Hampden and Hampshire | Michael Knapik (R-Westfield) | sought re-election | Michael Knapik (R-Westfield); Unopposed | 37,842 | 98.8% |
| Hampshire and Franklin | Stanley Rosenberg (D-Amherst) | sought re-election | Stanley Rosenberg (D-Amherst); Michaela LeBlanc (R-Northampton) | 46,417; 8,444 | 84.6% 15.4% |
| 1st Middlesex | Steven Panagiotakos (D-Lowell) | sought re-election | Steven Panagiotakos (D-Lowell); Brooks Lyman (R-Groton) | 32,403; 10,314 | 75.8% 24.1% |
| 2nd Middlesex | Pat Jehlan (D-Somerville) | sought re-election | Pat Jehlan (D-Somerville); Unopposed | 38,780 | 98.1% |
| 3rd Middlesex | Susan Fargo (D-Lincoln) | sought re-election | Susan Fargo (D-Lincoln); Sandra Martinez (R-Chelmsford) | 38,200; 21,557 | 63.9% 36.0% |
| 4th Middlesex* | Robert Havern III (D-Arlington) | sought re-election | Robert Havern III (D-Arlington)*; Unopposed | 47,947 | 98.6% |
| Middlesex and Essex | Richard Tisei (R-Wakefield) | sought re-election | Richard Tisei (R-Wakefield); Unopposed | 43,466 | 98.5% |
| 1st Middlesex and Norfolk | Cynthia Stone Creem (D-Newton) | sought re-election | Cynthia Stone Creem (D-Newton); Unopposed | 45,117 | 99.2% |
| 2nd Middlesex and Norfolk | Karen Spilka (D-Ashland) | sought re-election | Karen Spilka (D-Ashland); Unopposed | 43,657 | 98.2% |
| Middlesex, Suffolk and Essex | Jarrett Barrios (D-Cambridge) | sought re-election | Jarrett Barrios (D-Cambridge); Unopposed | 31,860 | 99.0% |
| Middlesex and Worcester | Pamela Resor (D-Acton) | sought re-election | Pamela Resor (D-Acton); Unopposed | 49,747 | 97.8% |
| Norfolk, Bristol and Middlesex | Scott Brown (R-Wrentham) | sought re-election | Scott Brown (R-Wrentham); Unopposed | 46,972 | 98.1% |
| Norfolk, Bristol and Plymouth | Brian Joyce (D-Milton) | sought re-election | Brian Joyce (D-Milton); James Aldred (R-Randolph) | 43,811; 14,327 | 75.3% 24.6% |
| Norfolk and Plymouth | Michael W. Morrissey (D-Quincy) | sought re-election | Michael W. Morrissey (D-Quincy); Unopposed | 42,747 | 98.9% |
| Plymouth and Barnstable | Therese Murray (D-Plymouth) | sought re-election | Therese Murray (D-Plymouth); Unopposed | 54,042 | 98.7% |
| 1st Plymouth and Bristol | Marc Pacheco (D-Taunton) | sought re-election | Marc Pacheco (D-Taunton); Unopposed | 43,200 | 99.1% |
| 2nd Plymouth and Bristol | Robert Creedon, Jr. (D-Brockton) | sought re-election | Robert Creedon, Jr. (D-Brockton); Unopposed | 35,820 | 99.4% |
| Plymouth and Norfolk | Robert Hedlund (R-Weymouth) | sought re-election | Robert Hedlund (R-Weymouth); Stephen Lynch (D-Marshfield)* | 43,638; 24,114 | 64.4% 35.6% |
| 1st Suffolk | John Hart, Jr. (D-Boston) | sought re-election | John Hart, Jr. (D-Boston); Unopposed | 33,084 | 98.8% |
| 2nd Suffolk* | Dianne Wilkerson (D-Boston) | sought re-election | Dianne Wilkerson (D-Boston)*; Samiyah Diaz (R-Boston) | 28,820; 11,079 | 71.3% 27.4% |
| 1st Suffolk and Middlesex | Robert Travaglini (D-Boston) | sought re-election | Robert Travaglini (D-Boston); Unopposed | 32,621 | 98.8% |
| 2nd Suffolk and Middlesex | Steven Tolman (D-Boston) | sought re-election | Steven Tolman (D-Boston); Unopposed | 36,827 | 99.0% |
| Suffolk and Norfolk | Marian Walsh (D-Boston) | sought re-election | Marian Walsh (D-Boston); Douglas Obey (R-Westwood) | 37,930; 17,253 | 68.7% 31.2% |
| 1st Worcester | Harriette Chandler (D-Worcester)* | sought re-election | Harriette Chandler (D-Worcester)*; Paul Nordborg (R-Holden) | 35,904; 13,269 | 72.9% 27.0% |
| 2nd Worcester | Edward Augustus, Jr. (D-Worcester) | sought re-election | Edward Augustus, Jr. (D-Worcester); Richard Peters (R-Worcester); John Lazzaro (I-Millbury) | 33,187; 12,352; 3,616 | 67.5% 25.1% 7.4% |
| Worcester, Hampden, Hampshire and Franklin | Stephen Brewer (D-Barre) | sought re-election | Stephen Brewer (D-Barre); Unopposed | 48,460 | 99.6% |
| Worcester and Middlesex | Robert Antonioni (D-Leominster) | sought re-election | Robert Antonioni (D-Leominster); Unopposed | 41,373 | 99.2% |
| Worcester and Norfolk | Richard T. Moore (D-Uxbridge) | sought re-election | Richard T. Moore (D-Uxbridge); Unopposed | 44,702 | 99.2% |

== Primary results ==
Official results from State Primary Election Results 2006 (PDF, 196k) on the Massachusetts Elections Division website

=== Democratic primary ===
| District | Candidates | Votes | % |
|---|---|---|---|
| Berkshire, Hampshire and Franklin | Benjamin Downing | 7,574 | 32% |
| Berkshire, Hampshire and Franklin | Christopher Hodgkins | 7,334 | 31% |
| Berkshire, Hampshire and Franklin | Helen Sharron | 3,111 | 13% |
| Berkshire, Hampshire and Franklin | Margaret Ware | 5,221 | 22% |
| Berkshire, Hampshire and Franklin | John Zelazo | 394 | 2% |
| 1st Hampden and Hampshire | Brian Ashe | 6,585 | 36% |
| 1st Hampden and Hampshire | Gale Candaras | 8,362 | 46% |
| 1st Hampden and Hampshire | Rosemarie Mazza-Moriarty | 3,117 | 17% |
| 4th Middlesex | Joanna Gonsalves | 10,244 | 39% |
| 4th Middlesex | Robert Havern (i) | 15,722 | 61% |
| Plymouth and Norfolk | Stephen Lynch | 12,348 | 57% |
| Plymouth and Norfolk | Matthias Mulvey | 9,497 | 43% |
| 2nd Suffolk | Write-In: Sonia Chang-Diaz | 5,711 | 45% |
| 2nd Suffolk | Write-In: Samiyah Diaz | 238 | 2% |
| 2nd Suffolk | Write-In: John Kelleher | 400 | 3% |
| 2nd Suffolk | Write-In: Dianne Wilkerson (i) | 6,478 | 51% |
| 1st Worcester | Harriette Chandler (i) | 16,847 | 77% |
| 1st Worcester | Deirdre Healy | 5,153 | 23% |

=== Republican primary ===
| District | Candidates | Votes | % |
|---|---|---|---|
| Cape and Islands | Ricardo Barros | 4,258 | 59% |
| Cape and Islands | Doug Bennett | 3,006 | 41% |
| 1st Hampden and Hampshire | Kevin Corridan | 1,200 | 31% |
| 1st Hampden and Hampshire | Ronald Cutler | 679 | 18% |
| 1st Hampden and Hampshire | Enrico Villamaino | 1,962 | 51% |

== See also ==
- 2007–2008 Massachusetts legislature
- List of Massachusetts General Courts
