= 2004 Massachusetts Senate election =

- November 2, 2004

All 40 seats in the Massachusetts Senate 21 seats needed for a majority
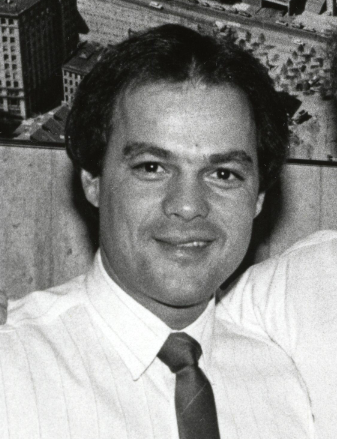

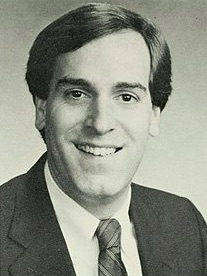
	Majority party	Minority party
Leader	Robert Travaglini	Brian Lees
Party	Democratic	Republican
Leader since	January 1, 2003	1993
Leader's seat	1st Suffolk and Middlesex	1st Hampden and Hampshire
Last election	34 seats	6 seats
Seats before	33	7
Seats won	34	6
Seat change	▲1	▼1
- Results: Democratic gain Democratic hold Republican hold
President before election
Robert Travaglini
Democratic
Elected President
Robert Travaglini
Democratic

Elections to the 185th Massachusetts Senate were held on November 2, 2004. The Democrats picked up one former Republican seat. The 185th Massachusetts General Court began in January 2005, and consisted of 34 Democrats and 6 Republican State Senators.

The 2004 Massachusetts House election was held on the same date as the Senate election, as well as Federal and Congressional elections. Massachusetts Senators serve two-year terms.

== Results ==
Summary of the November 2, 2004 Massachusetts Senate election results
Party	Seats			Popular Vote	
Party	2002	2004	+/−	Vote	%
Democratic Party	33	34	+1	1,725,309	66.68%
Republican Party	7	6	−1	805,215	31.12%
Independents	0	0	0	41,119	1.6%
Libertarian Party	0	0	0	5,374	0.2%
Green Party	0	0	0	2,072	0.1%
Others	0	0	0	8,445	0.3%
Total	40	40	0	2,587,534	100%

== Predictions ==
Source	Ranking	As of
Rothenberg	Safe D	October 1, 2004

== Overview ==
Official results from State Election Results 2004 (PDF, 459k) on the Massachusetts Elections Division website

District	Incumbent	Status	Competing candidates	2004 Result	%
Berkshire, Hampshire and Franklin	Andrea F. Nuciforo Jr. (D-Pittsfield)	sought re-election	Andrea F. Nuciforo Jr. (D-Pittsfield); Dawn T. Thompson (R-Richmond)	56,467; 16,285	77.6% 22.4%
Bristol and Norfolk	Jo Ann Sprague (R-Walpole)	retired	David W. McCarter (R-Mansfield)*; James E. Timilty (D-Walpole)	31,823; 41,702	43.3% 56.7%
1st Bristol and Plymouth	Joan Menard (D-Somerset)	sought re-election	Joan Menard (D-Somerset); Unopposed	53,794	99.4%
2nd Bristol and Plymouth	Mark Montigny (D-New Bedford)	sought re-election	Mark Montigny (D-New Bedford); Unopposed	54,157	99.5%
Cape and Islands	Robert O'Leary (D-Barnstable)	sought re-election	Robert O'Leary (D-Barnstable); Gail B. Lese (R-Yarmouth); Luiz Gonzaga (I-Barnstable)	55,119; 38,331; 3,859	56.6% 39.4% 4.0%
1st Essex	Steven Baddour (D-Methuen)	sough re-election	Steven Baddour (D-Methuen); Leo T. Martin (R-Haverhill)	49,011; 22,357	68.6% 31.3%
2nd Essex	Frederick Berry (D-Peabody)	sought re-election	Frederick Berry (D-Peabody); Unopposed	59,816	99.0%
1st Essex and Middlesex	Bruce Tarr (R-Gloucester)	sought re-election	Bruce Tarr (R-Gloucester); Paul M. McGeary (D-Gloucester)	56,020; 30,179	64.8% 34.9%
2nd Essex and Middlesex	Susan Tucker (D-Andover)	sought re-election	Susan Tucker (D-Andover); Deborah J. Jones (R-Andover)	42,042; 16,626	71.6% 28.3%
3rd Essex and Middlesex	Thomas M. McGee (D-Lynn)	sought re-election	Thomas M. McGee (D-Lynn); Unopposed	47,324	99.2%
Hampden	Linda J. Melconian (D-Springfield)	retired	Stephen Buoniconti (D-West Springfield); Travis W. Chaput (R-West Springfield)	35,627; 12,654	73.7% 26.1%
1st Hampden and Hampshire	Brian Lees (R-East Longmeadow)	sought re-election	Brian Lees (R-East Longmeadow); Unopposed	54,546	98.7%
2nd Hampden and Hampshire	Michael Knapik (R-Westfield)	sought re-election	Michael Knapik (R-Westfield); Unopposed*	51,002	99.2%
Hampshire and Franklin	Stanley Rosenberg (D-Amherst)	sought re-election	Stanley Rosenberg (D-Amherst); James D. Miller (R-Pelham)	58,886; 11,590	83.5% 16.4%
1st Middlesex	Steven Panagiotakos (D-Lowell)	sought re-election	Steven Panagiotakos (D-Lowell); Brooks Lyman (R-Groton)	43,080; 13,737	75.8% 24.2%
2nd Middlesex	Charles Shannon Jr. (D-Winchester)	sought re-election	Charles Shannon Jr. (D-Winchester); Unopposed	51,010	98.6%
3rd Middlesex	Susan Fargo (D-Lincoln)	sought re-election	Susan Fargo (D-Lincoln); John C. Thibault (R-Chelmsford)	45,284; 30,521	59.7% 40.2%
4th Middlesex	Robert Havern III (D-Arlington)	sought re-election	Robert Havern III (D-Arlington); Douglas M. Lucente (R-Lexington)*	50,240; 25,619	66.1% 33.7%
Middlesex and Essex	Richard Tisei (R-Wakefield)	sought re-election	Richard Tisei (R-Wakefield); Katherine Clark (D-Melrose)	43,105; 31,638	57.6% 42.3%
1st Middlesex and Norfolk	Cynthia Stone Creem (D-Newton)	sought re-election	Cynthia Stone Creem (D-Newton); Matthew Fraser (R-Brookline)	53,879; 15,934	77.1% 22.8%
2nd Middlesex and Norfolk	David P. Magnani (D-Ashland)	retired	Karen Spilka (D-Ashland)*; James F. Coffey (R-Hopkinton)	40,982; 30,554	57.2% 42.6%
Middlesex, Suffolk and Essex	Jarrett Barrios (D-Cambridge)	sought re-election	Jarrett Barrios (D-Cambridge); Unopposed	39,991	99.2%
Middlesex and Worcester	Pamela Resor (D-Acton)	sought re-election	Pamela Resor (D-Acton); Rod Jané (R-Westborough)*	47,353; 32,054	59.6% 40.3%
Norfolk, Bristol and Middlesex	Scott Brown (R-Wrentham)	sought re-election	Scott Brown (R-Wrentham); Angus G. McQuilken (D-Millis)*; Louis Sinoff (L-Wayland)	41,889; 39,253; 1,682	50.5% 47.4% 2.0%
Norfolk, Bristol and Plymouth	Brian Joyce (D-Milton)	sought re-election	Brian Joyce (D-Milton); Unopposed	56,890	99.5%
Norfolk and Plymouth	Michael W. Morrissey (D-Quincy)	sought re-election	Michael W. Morrissey (D-Quincy); Unopposed	54,996	99.0%
Plymouth and Barnstable	Therese Murray (D-Plymouth)	sought re-election	Therese Murray (D-Plymouth); Timothy E. Duncan (R-Falmouth)	50,342; 36,921	57.7% 42.3%
1st Plymouth and Bristol	Marc Pacheco (D-Taunton)	sought re-election	Marc Pacheco (D-Taunton); Donald J. Jonah (R-Middleborough)	51,783; 18,289	73.8% 26.1%
2nd Plymouth and Bristol	Robert S. Creedon Jr. (D-Brockton)	sought re-election	Robert S. Creedon Jr. (D-Brockton); Lawrence P. Novak (R-Brockton)	38,836; 18,533	67.7% 32.3%
Plymouth and Norfolk	Robert L. Hedlund (R-Weymouth)	sought re-election	Robert L. Hedlund (R-Weymouth); Unopposed	67,283	98.5%
1st Suffolk	John Hart Jr. (D-Boston)	sought re-election	John Hart Jr. (D-Boston)*; Susan C. Long (I-Boston)	38,140; 8,622	81.3% 18.4%
2nd Suffolk	Dianne Wilkerson (D-Boston)	sought re-election	Dianne Wilkerson (D-Boston); Unopposed	46,008	98.4%
1st Suffolk and Middlesex	Robert Travaglini (D-Boston)	sought re-election	Robert Travaglini (D-Boston); Gilbert R. Lavoie (R-Boston)	40,894; 10,322	79.7% 20.1%
2nd Suffolk and Middlesex	Steven Tolman (D-Boston)	sought re-election	Steven Tolman (D-Boston); Robert P. Ferencsik (R-Boston)	48,214; 9,981	82.8% 17.1%
Suffolk and Norfolk	Marian Walsh (D-Boston)	sought re-election	Marian Walsh (D-Boston); Robert W. Joyce (I-Boston)	43,245; 24,183	64.1% 35.8%
1st Worcester	Harriette Chandler (D-Worcester)	sought re-election	Harriette Chandler (D-Worcester); Stephen N. Paige (R-West Boylston)	42,473; 21,183	66.6% 33.2%
2nd Worcester	Edward M. Augustus Jr. (D-Worcester)	sought re-election	Edward M. Augustus Jr. (D-Worcester); Robi Blute (R-Shrewsbury); Jane M. Burdzel (I-Leicester)	39,948; 21,546; 4,455	60.5% 32.6% 6.7%
Worcester, Hampden, Hampshire and Franklin	Stephen Brewer (D-Barre)	sought re-election	Stephen Brewer (D-Barre); Jennifer J. Gaucher (R-Spencer); Carolyn J. McMahon (L-Monson)	53,969; 13,956; 3,692	75.3% 19.5% 5.2%
Worcester and Middlesex	Robert Antonioni (D-Leominster)	sought re-election	Robert Antonioni (D-Leominster); David Shnaider (R-Sterling); Richard R. Zitola (G-Clinton)	40,982; 23,087; 2,072	61.9% 34.9% 3.1%
Worcester and Norfolk	Richard T. Moore (D-Uxbridge)	sought re-election	Richard T. Moore (D-Uxbridge); Jerzy J. Jachimczyk (R-Southbridge)	51,755; 21,267	70.8% 29.1%

== Primary results ==
Official results from State Primary Election Results 2004 (PDF, 424k) on the Massachusetts Elections Division website

=== Democratic primary ===
District	Candidates	Votes	%
2nd Hampden and Hampshire	Write-In: Todd McGee	244	32%
2nd Middlesex and Norfolk	Gerard E. Desilets	3,528	28%
2nd Middlesex and Norfolk	Adam L. Sistisky	2,374	19%
2nd Middlesex and Norfolk	Karen E. Spilka	6,808	53%
Norfolk, Bristol and Middlesex	Angus G. McQuilken	5,440	56%
Norfolk, Bristol and Middlesex	Patricia B. Ross	504	5%
Norfolk, Bristol and Middlesex	Barbara A. Smith	695	7%
Norfolk, Bristol and Middlesex	Gerald A. Wasserman	3,080	32%
1st Suffolk	Jack Hart (i)	11,126	97%
1st Suffolk	Write-In: Carol Y. Mallory-Causey	27	0.2%

=== Republican primary ===
District	Candidates	Votes	%
Bristol and Norfolk	Philip A. Brown	1,109	45%
Bristol and Norfolk	David W. McCarter	1,339	55%
4th Middlesex	Richard J. Dellarciprete	679	30%
4th Middlesex	Douglas M. Lucente	1,564	69%
Middlesex and Worcester	Rod Jané	3,243	57%
Middlesex and Worcester	Arthur G. Vigeant	2,414	43%

== See also ==
- 2005–2006 Massachusetts legislature
- List of Massachusetts General Courts
