= 2010 Massachusetts Senate election =

- November 2, 2010

All 40 seats in the Massachusetts Senate 21 seats needed for a majority
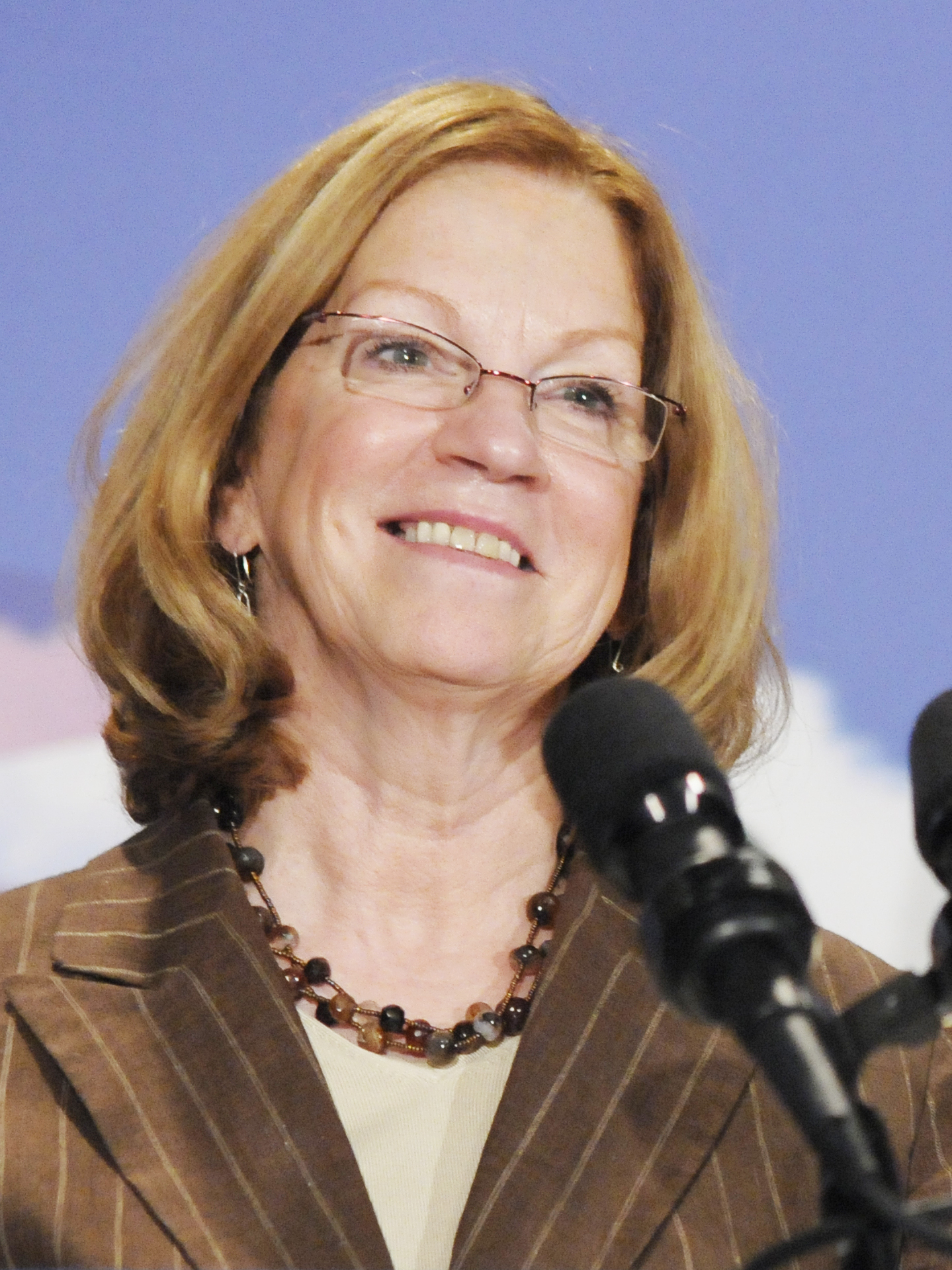

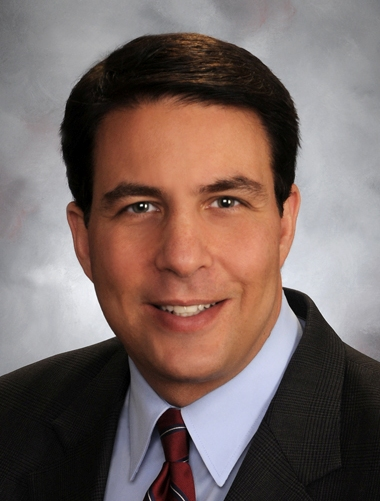
	Majority party	Minority party
Leader	Therese Murray	Richard Tisei (retired)
Party	Democratic	Republican
Leader since	March 21, 2007	January 3, 2007
Leader's seat	Plymouth and Barnstable	Middlesex and Essex
Last election	35 seats	5 seats
Seats won	36	4
Seat change	▲1	▼1
- Results: Democratic gain Democratic hold Republican hold
President before election
Therese Murray
Democratic
Elected President
Therese Murray
Democratic

In the elections to the Massachusetts State Senate in 2010, the Democrats continued their dominance, winning 36 seats against 4 seats for the Republicans.

== Predictions ==
Source	Ranking	As of
Governing	Safe D	November 1, 2010

== Election results ==
District	Incumbent	Party	First elected	Result	Candidates
Berkshire, Hampshire, and Franklin	Benjamin Downing	Democratic	2006	Re-elected	Benjamin Downing (D) unopposed
Bristol and Norfolk	James Timilty	Democratic	2004	Re-elected	James Timilty (D) unopposed
1st Bristol and Plymouth	Joan Menard	Democratic	2000	Retired; Democratic hold	Michael Rodrigues (D) 62.16% Derek Maksy (R) 37.84%
2nd Bristol and Plymouth	Mark Montigny	Democratic	1992	Re-elected	Mark Montigny (D) unopposed
Cape and Islands	Robert O'Leary	Democratic	2000	Retired to run for 10th Congressional District; Democratic hold	Dan Wolf (D) 57.45% James Crocker (R) 42.55%
1st Essex	Steven Baddour	Democratic	2002	Re-elected	Steven Baddour (D) unopposed
2nd Essex	Frederick Berry	Democratic	1982	Re-elected	Frederick Berry (D) 61.51% Richard Jolitz (R) 31.47% Matthew Fraser (I) 7.02%
1st Essex and Middlesex	Bruce Tarr	Republican	1994	Re-elected	Bruce Tarr (R) unopposed

== See also ==
- 2011–2012 Massachusetts legislature
- List of Massachusetts General Courts
