= Edward Augustus =

Edward Augustus may refer to:

- Prince Edward, Duke of York and Albany (1739–1767)
- Prince Edward, Duke of Kent and Strathearn (1767–1820)
- Edward Augustus (politician) (born 1965), American politician and administrator in Massachusetts
