= Adam G. Hinds =

American politician

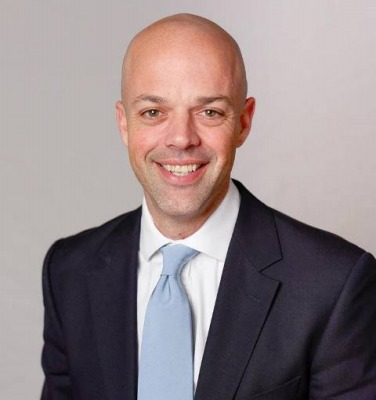

Member of the Massachusetts Senate from the Berkshire, Hampshire, Franklin, and Hampden district
- In office January 4, 2017 – September 25, 2022
- Preceded by: Benjamin Downing
- Succeeded by: Paul Mark

Personal details
- Party: Democratic
- Domestic partner: Dr. Alicia J. Mireles Christoff
- Education: Wesleyan University; The Fletcher School of Law and Diplomacy, Tufts University
- Website: www.adamhinds.org

Adam G. Hinds is an American politician. He currently serves the CEO of the Edward M. Kennedy Institute for the United States Senate. From 2017 to 2022 he represented the Berkshire, Hampshire, Franklin, and Hampden district the Massachusetts Senate. Hinds previously worked for the United Nations in the Middle East.

== Career ==
=== United States Congressman John Olver ===
After college, Hinds was Field Director for US Congressman John Olver’s 1998 re-election campaign in the 1st Congressional District of Massachusetts. Hinds spent time volunteering in India before returning as Campaign Director for Congressman Olver during 2000.

=== John Kerry for President ===
After graduating school, Hinds joined John Kerry’s presidential campaign. During the democratic primary Hinds led a field office in New Hampshire. During the general election Hinds was part of the National Security and Foreign Policy team, working directly for Susan Rice.

=== United Nations ===
==== United Nations Assistance Mission for Iraq (UNAMI) ====
Hinds joined the United Nations in 2005. He was a Political Officer based in Baghdad working for the United Nations Assistance Mission for Iraq (UNAMI). In 2007 he spent two years as part of the Iraq Team in the Department of Political Affairs at UN Headquarters in New York. Hinds returned to Iraq in 2009 as a Team Leader in UN-led negotiations between the Kurdistan region and the Government of Iraq.

==== United Nations Special Coordinator for the Middle East Peace Process (UNSCO) ====
From 2011–2013, Hinds was based in Jerusalem working with the United Nations Special Coordinator for the Middle East Peace Process (UNSCO) as a Regional Affairs Officer. In April 2012, Hinds joined former UN Secretary-General Kofi Annan on assignment in Geneva. During that period Kofi Annan was Special Envoy for Syria and brokered the first cease-fire in the violence in Syria that emerged as part of the Arab Spring.

==== Syria Team & OPCW-UN Joint Mission in Syria ====
Hinds returned to New York in 2013 to join the Syria Team in the Department of Political Affairs where he worked on post-conflict preparedness and to remove Syria's chemical weapons program as part of the OPCW-UN Joint Mission in Syria.

=== Community work ===
Hinds returned to western Massachusetts in 2014 and started a program in Pittsfield, Massachusetts to work with high-risk youth at risk of being involved in violence and gang participation. He then became the Executive Director of the Northern Berkshire Community Coalition, an organization that works on community development, including addressing youth development, addiction, and rural health access.

=== Massachusetts State Senate ===
Hinds was elected to the Massachusetts State Senate in November 2016 and was re-elected in 2018. Hinds is the Chair of the Joint Committee on Revenue and serves on the following committees within the Senate Chamber: the Senate Committee on Ways and Means, Education, Healthcare Financing, Rules, and Tourism, Arts & Cultural Development. Hinds is the Vice Chair of the Senate Committee on Redistricting. In 2022, Hinds ran for Lieutenant Governor of Massachusetts. At that year's Democratic convention he fell short of the 15% threshold needed to make a primary ballot, securing 12.4%.

=== Edward M. Kennedy Institute ===
Hinds resigned from the Senate on September 25, 2022 to become the chief executive officer and executive director the Edward M. Kennedy Institute for the United States Senate.

== Personal life ==
On December 19, 2018 it was announced that Hinds was engaged to be married to Dr. Alicia Mireles Christoff. On August 24, 2019 Hinds and Christoff were married in Sheffield, Massachusetts.

== Electoral history ==
2016 State Senate Primary
Party	Candidate	Vote %	Votes
Democratic	Adam G. Hinds (won)	54.42%	8,455
Democratic	Andrea C. Harrington	38.53%	5,986
Democratic	Rinaldo Del Gallo	7.05%	1,096

2016 State Senate General Election
Party	Candidate	Vote %	Votes
Democratic	Adam G. Hinds (won)	70.17%	53,216
Republican	Christine M. Canning	29.83%	22,624

2018 State Senate Primary
Party	Candidate	Vote %	Votes
Democratic	Adam G. Hinds (won)	87.49%	21,242
Democratic	Thomas Wickham	12.51%	3,036

== See also ==
- 2019–2020 Massachusetts legislature
- 2021–2022 Massachusetts legislature
