= Gilbert R. Lavoie =

American physician and writer

Gilbert R. Lavoie is a medical doctor and non-fiction writer.

Lavoie studied medicine at the Medical College of Virginia and the Johns Hopkins School of Hygiene and Public Health. He is board certified in internal medicine and occupational medicine.

Lavoie has studied the Shroud of Turin, the reputed burial cloth of Jesus Christ, for more than twenty years and has written two books on his findings as well as other original studies. He approached his study as from a scientific standpoint and as a doctor and discovered in his research that the image on the cloth could not be a painting. In his books Lavoie claims that the Shroud points to the resurrection of Jesus.

In 2004, Lavoie ran for the 1st Suffolk & Middlesex district seat of the Massachusetts Senate as a Republican, challenging Robert Travaglini, a six-term incumbent Democrat. He lost by a wide margin.

== Selected bibliography ==
- Lavoie, Gilbert R. (2000). Resurrected: Tangible Evidence That Jesus Rose from the Dead. Notre Dame, Indiana: Ave Maria Press. ISBN 0-88347-458-1. OCLC 44640691.
- Lavoie, Gilbert R. (1998). Unlocking the secrets of the Shroud. Notre Dame, Indiana: Ave Maria Press. ISBN 0-88347-395-X. OCLC 38552186.
