= Kevin J. Murphy (politician) =

American politician

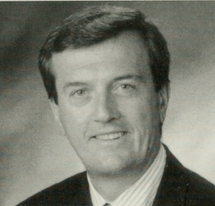
- Portrait of Kevin J. Murphy

City Manager of Lowell, Massachusetts
- In office 2014–2018
- Preceded by: Bernard F. Lynch
- Succeeded by: Eileen Donoghue

Member of the Massachusetts House of Representatives
- In office 1997–2014
- Preceded by: Steven C. Panagiotakos
- Succeeded by: Rady Mom

Personal details
- Born: November 27, 1952 (age 73) Lowell, Massachusetts
- Party: Democratic
- Spouse: Ann Murphy
- Education: Boston College; Suffolk University Law School
- Occupation: Attorney; Politician; City Manager

Kevin J. Murphy is an American politician who served as city manager of Lowell, Massachusetts from 2014 to 2018 and from 1997 to 2014 was a member of the Massachusetts House of Representatives. Murphy is also an attorney and a member of the American Bar Association, Greater Lowell Bar Association, and the Massachusetts Bar Association.

== Committee assignments ==
- Steering, Policy and Schedule
- Public Health Joint Committee
- Children, Families and Persons with Disabilities Joint Committee

== Elections ==
=== 2010 ===
Massachusetts House of Representatives General Election, Eighteenth Middlesex District (2010)
Party	Candidate	Votes	%
Democratic	Kevin J. Murphy	4,782	99.60
None	All others	19	0.40
Total votes		4,801	100
Democratic hold			

=== 2008 ===
Massachusetts House of Representatives General Election, Eighteenth Middlesex District (2008)
Party	Candidate	Votes	%
Democratic	Kevin J. Murphy	6,604	69.35
None	Kenneth Patrician	1,289	13.53
None	All others	3	0.05
Rejected ballots		1,626	17.07%
Total votes		9,522	100
Democratic hold			

== See also ==
- Massachusetts House of Representatives' 18th Middlesex district
