= Benjamin Downing =

American politician

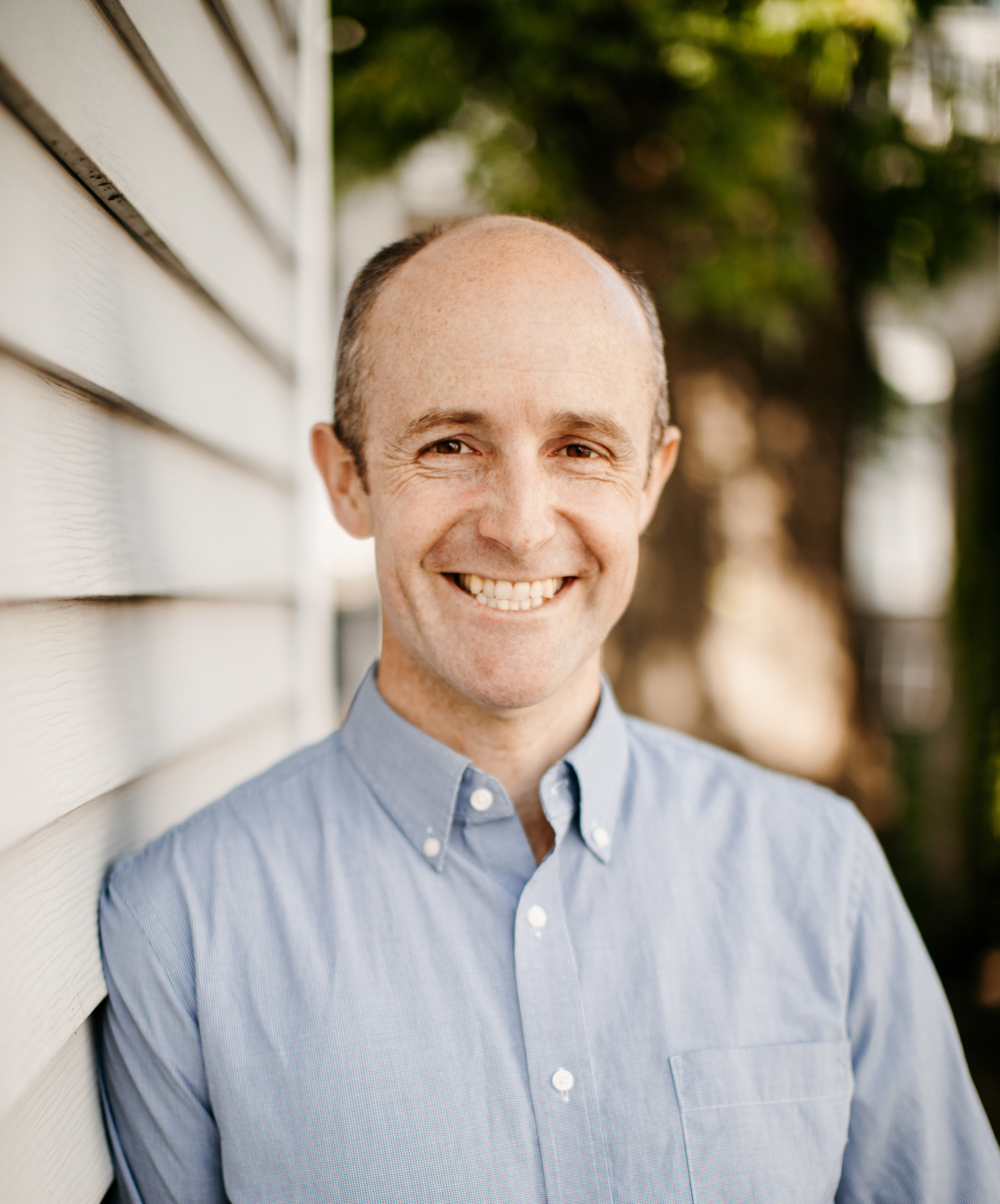

Member of the Massachusetts Senate
- In office January 3, 2007 – January 4, 2017
- Preceded by: Andrea Nuciforo
- Succeeded by: Adam G. Hinds
- Constituency: Berkshire, Hampshire and Franklin (2007–13); Berkshire, Hampshire, Franklin, and Hampden (2013–17)

Personal details
- Born: Benjamin Brackett Downing; September 11, 1981 (age 45) Great Barrington, Massachusetts, U.S.
- Party: Democratic
- Education: Providence College; Tufts University

Benjamin Brackett Downing (born September 11, 1981) is an American politician and Democratic former member of the Massachusetts State Senate. He represented the Berkshire, Hampshire and Franklin district from 2007 to 2013, before being redistricted to the Berkshire, Hampshire, Franklin, and Hampden district, which he represented until 2017.

== Life and career ==
The oldest of four children, Benjamin Downing was born in Pittsfield to Gerard, the late Berkshire County District Attorney, and Pamela Downing. He attended Providence College in Rhode Island, and graduated with a Bachelor of Arts degree in political science in 2003. He then moved to Washington, D.C., where he worked for U.S. Representatives Bill Delahunt and Richard Neal before joining the staff of John Olver. He served as Olver's senior advisor on housing, budget, tax, homeland security, and foreign affairs for two years.

He returned to Massachusetts in 2004 and began his graduate studies at Tufts University, where he went on to receive a Master of Arts degree in Urban & Environmental Policy. While a student at Tufts, he successfully ran for an open seat in the Massachusetts Senate in 2006. He won re-election unopposed in 2008, 2010, 2012, and 2014. During the tenure in the Senate, he served as chair, Joint Committee on Telecommunications, Utilities and Energy (2011-2014); chair, Senate Committee on Bills in Third Reading (2013-2014); chair, Senate Committee on Steering & Policy (2012); Acting Chair, Joint Committee on Higher Education (2010); chair, Joint Committee on Revenue (2009-2010); chair, Senate Committee on Ethics and Rules (2007-2008); chair, Joint Committee on Public Service (2007).

Keeping a promise he made at the start of his tenure in the Senate, Downing term-limited himself and announced in January 2016 that he would not seek a sixth term. Upon leaving public office, he joined leading renewable energy company Nexamp.

Ben has previously served as co-chair of the Leadership Council to End Chronic Homelessness in Berkshire County, co-chair, Massachusetts Democratic Party's Committee on Youth Services, Advisory Council of Multicultural BRIDGE, “Honorary Chairman, College Democrats of Massachusetts," Advisory Council of the Mahaiwe Performing Arts Center, Honorary Member of the Advisory Committee on Workforce Development for Homeless Families, Member of the Pittsfield Democratic Committee, and Member of the Massachusetts Democratic Party's Rural Subcommittee.

In February 2021, he announced his campaign for Governor of Massachusetts in the 2022 election, becoming the first candidate to enter the race. On December 28, 2021, Downing announced he was ending his campaign bid for Governor of Massachusetts.

== Electoral history ==
2014 State Senate General Election for Massachusetts' Berkshire, Hampshire, Franklin, and Hampden District
Party	Candidate	Votes	%
Democratic	Benjamin B. Downing	40,795	99.62
Write-In	Others	154	0.38

2012 State Senate General Election for Massachusetts' Berkshire, Hampshire, Franklin, and Hampden District
Party	Candidate	Votes	%
Democratic	Benjamin B. Downing	64,679	99.53
Write-In	Others	307	0.47

2010 State Senate General Election for Massachusetts' Berkshire, Hampshire, and Franklin District
Party	Candidate	Votes	%
Democratic	Benjamin B. Downing	41,627	99.37
Write-In	Others	264	0.63

2008 State Senate General Election for Massachusetts' Berkshire, Hampshire, and Franklin District
Party	Candidate	Votes	%
Democratic	Benjamin B. Downing	63,559	99.29
Write-In	Others	453	0.71

2006 State Senate General Election for Massachusetts' Berkshire, Hampshire, and Franklin District
Party	Candidate	Votes	%
Democratic	Benjamin B. Downing	37,763	70.76
Republican	Matthew W. Kinnaman	13,595	25.47
Independent	Dion C. Robbins-Zust	1,988	3.72
Write-In	Others	25	0.05

2006 State Senate Democratic Primary Election for Massachusetts' Berkshire, Hampshire, and Franklin District
Party	Candidate	Votes	%
Democratic	Benjamin B. Downing	7,577	32.04
Democratic	Christopher Hodgkins	7,334	31.02
Democratic	Margaret J. Ware	5,221	22.08
Democratic	Helen Sharron	3,111	13.16
Democratic	John T. Zelazo	394	1.67
Write-In	Others	9	0.04
