= Multicultural BRIDGE =

Organization

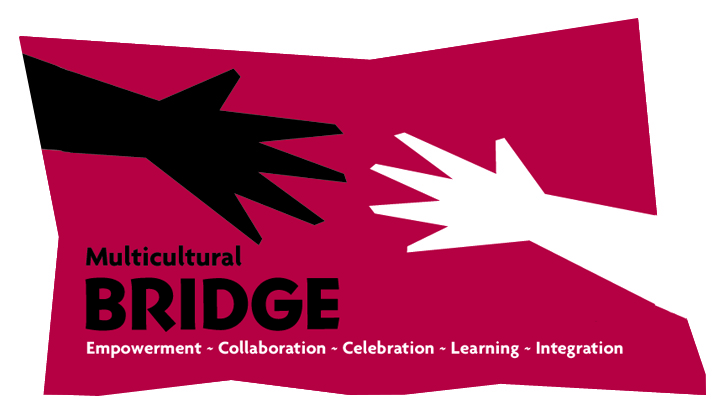
- Founded: September 2007
- Founder: Gwendolyn Hampton-VanSant, Director and CEO
- Purpose: Diversity Education
- Location: Lee, Massachusetts
- Region served: Berkshire County, Massachusetts
- Website: www.multiculturalbridge.org

Multicultural BRIDGE (Berkshire Resources for the Integration of Diverse Groups and Education, or BRIDGE Inc.) is a 501(c)(3) nonprofit organization based in Lee, Massachusetts. Co-founded by Gwendolyn Hampton VanSant and Marthe Bourdon, BRIDGE serves diverse groups in Berkshire County, Massachusetts, Boston, and other regions in Massachusetts, Vermont, and New York City. Services include workforce cultural literacy and cultural competency training, youth leadership and multicultural education, community-based civil rights and social justice forums and conferences, and multicultural advocacy. In 2015, BRIDGE received the Berkshire Trendsetter Award for Nonprofit Impact from 1Berkshire. BRIDGE is a minority and women-run nonprofit and is certified by the Commonwealth of Massachusetts as a Massachusetts Supplier Diversity Program Provider.

== Programs ==
=== Cultural competency training ===
BRIDGE conducted cultural competence training with municipal employees in Great Barrington and Pittsfield, Massachusetts and staff at the Berkshire Eagle, King Arthur Flour, and Fairview Hospital. During a 2010 cultural competency celebration held at Shakespeare & Company in Lenox, Massachusetts Governor Deval Patrick recognized BRIDGE for facilitating public and private sector group work.

=== Youth education ===
The organization works with Lenox Memorial High School, Miss Hall's School, Monument Mountain Regional High School, Pittsfield High School, Berkshire Farm Center and Services for Youth, and Massachusetts College of Liberal Arts to facilitate multicultural youth programs and educational film screenings. BRIDGE has also worked as a partner with Berkshire Hills Regional School District on parent education and family engagement through a grant from the US Department of Education since 2012.

=== Public forums ===
The organization founded the Berkshire County Race Task Force, whose first town hall meeting was held at Shakespeare & Company in collaboration with the Community Relations Service of the U.S. Department of Justice and hosted the Berkshire County Civil Rights Conference with support from Massachusetts U.S. Attorney Carmen Ortiz as keynote speaker and Massachusetts State Representative William "Smitty" Pignatelli, State Legislator Tricia Farley-Bouvier, and Pittsfield Mayor Daniel Bianchi. In 2014, BRIDGE was recognized for the efficacy of its cultural competence programs by Carolyn Turpin-Petrosino of Bridgewater State University in Understanding Hate Crimes: Acts, Motives, Offenders, Victims, and Justice

=== Multicultural advocacy ===
BRIDGE profiles multicultural leadership in the Berkshires through a monthly blog distributed through The Berkshire Eagle. These editorials were collected into an anthology crowdfunded through IndieGogo in late 2014 and published in 2015 as Berkshire Mosaic: A Multicultural BRIDGE Living History Project.

== See also ==
- Multiculturalism
- Cross-cultural
- Diversity training
- Cultural diversity
