= Cory Atkins =

American politician

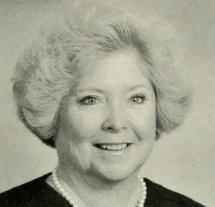
- Atkins Official Portrait in 2003

Member of the Massachusetts House of Representatives from the 14th Middlesex district
- In office 1999–2019
- Preceded by: Pam Resor
- Succeeded by: Tami Gouveia

Personal details
- Born: February 10, 1947 (age 79) Boston, Massachusetts, U.S.
- Party: Democratic
- Education: University of Massachusetts at Boston
- Occupation: Writer/legislator

Cory Atkins (born February 10, 1947) is an American politician who served in the Massachusetts House of Representatives from 1999 to 2019. Atkins is a Concord resident and a member of the Democratic Party.

== Background ==
Born in Boston, Massachusetts, Atkins went to Burdett Business School and then received her bachelor's degree from University of Massachusetts Boston. Prior to serving in the Massachusetts House of Representatives, Atkins worked as a partner with ADS Ventures from 1992 until 1999. She is an instructor at Middlesex Community College and writes a political newspaper column and travel column. She was married to Chester G. Atkins who also served in the Massachusetts General Court and in the United States House of Representatives, but has been separated from him for several years.

== Politics ==
June 1, 2016, Voted Yea on Bill S 735 to pass a bill that prohibits discrimination based on gender identity in public places.

March 9, 2016, Voted Yea on Bill H4049 to establish regulations for ride-sharing companies.

July 31, 2014, Voted Yea on Bill H 4278 to amend firearm laws

June 18, 2014, Voted Yea on Bill S 2123 to increase the minimum wage

January 22, 2013, Atkins introduced House Bill 2491, authorizing the town of Concord to impose an income tax on its residents to provide property tax relief.

Jan 28, 2010, Voted Yea on Bill H 4441 to establish school nutrition standards

April 27, 2009, Voted Yea along with 108 other Democrats on the Sciortino Amdt to increase sales tax from 5 percent to 6.25 percent

July 29, 2008, Voted Nay to Bill H 5022 to reduce the firearm licensing fee

Jan. 23, 2008, Voted Yea to Bill H 4477 to ban cellphone use while driving a motorcycle

== Protest vote ==
Cory Atkins is well known for her protest vote against Mass. House Speaker Sal DiMaisi's reelection in 2009. Atkins, along with six other Democrats, voted "present" as a signal to the need for new leadership on Beacon Hill. These seven Democrats were praised for their bold vote against DiMaisi. Atkins pointed to her duty to serve her constituents with her best judgement.
