= Christopher Hodgkins =

American politician

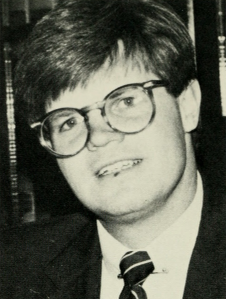
- Portrait of Christopher Hodgkins

Member of the Massachusetts House of Representatives from the 4th Berkshire District
- In office 1983–2003
- Preceded by: Dennis Duffin
- Succeeded by: William "Smitty" Pignatelli

Personal details
- Born: August 24, 1957 (age 69) Tucson, Arizona
- Party: Democratic
- Education: Berkshire Community College; University of Massachusetts Amherst
- Occupation: Teacher; Police Officer; State Representative

Christopher J. Hodgkins (born August 24, 1957 in Tucson, Arizona) is an American politician who represented the 4th Berkshire District in the Massachusetts House of Representatives from 1983 to 2003. In 2006 he was a candidate for Massachusetts Senate in the Berkshire, Hampshire & Franklin District, but lost the Democratic primary to Benjamin Downing.
