= Jim Marzilli =

American politician

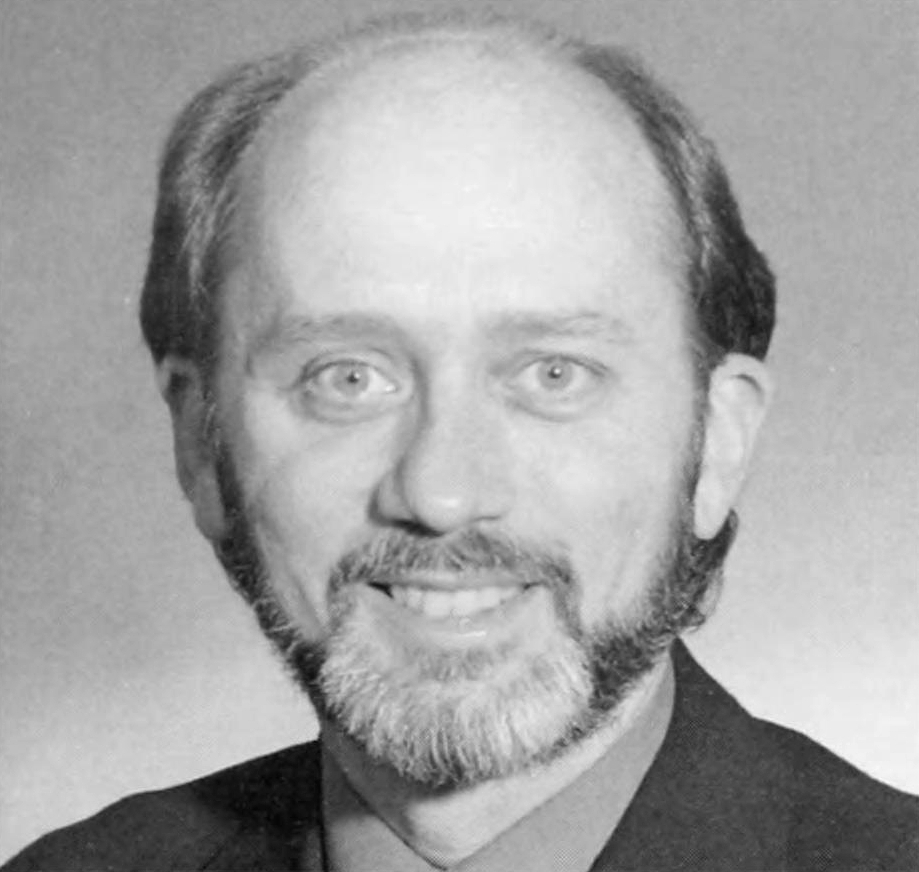
- Marzilli c. 2005

Member of the Massachusetts Senate from the 4th Middlesex district
- In office December 2007 – November 14, 2008
- Preceded by: Robert Havern III
- Succeeded by: Ken Donnelly

Member of the Massachusetts House of Representatives from the 23rd Middlesex district
- In office 1991–2007
- Preceded by: Robert Havern III
- Succeeded by: Sean Garballey

Personal details
- Born: May 8, 1958 (age 68) Stoneham, Massachusetts
- Party: Democratic
- Website: marzilli.org

Joseph James Marzilli Jr. (born May 8, 1958, in Stoneham, Massachusetts) is a former member of the Massachusetts Senate. Marzilli, a Democrat, was elected to the Senate in a special election in December 2007, representing the communities of Arlington, Billerica, Burlington, Lexington and Woburn partway through his ninth term in the Massachusetts House of Representatives, representing Arlington and West Medford. He was the Senate Chair of the Committee on Tourism, Arts and Cultural Development. He also served on the Committees on Children and Families, Mental Health and Substance Abuse and Veterans' Affairs. He resigned from the chamber on November 14, 2008, after charges of sexual harassment.

== Career ==
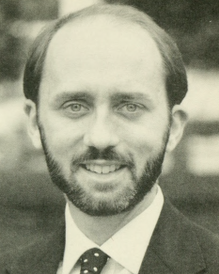
Marzilli c. 1995

Marzilli was educated in the Arlington Public Schools and received a bachelor's degree in political science from the University of Massachusetts Amherst.

He is an international relief worker with experience in Iraq during the US occupation in 2008, Burma/Myanmar training students and activists in democratic governance and public finance, and reforestation projects in Guatemala

Previously, Marzilli was a member of the state legislature in Massachusetts. He twice led successful fights to increase the minimum wage, giving the state the highest minimum wage in the nation. For three years he led the effort to increase the pay for the lowest paid human service workers, increasing the salary account to its highest level ever this year. He was given the "Self Sufficiency" award by the Massachusetts Association of Community Action Programs award in 2006 for his work on behalf of low wage workers.

Marzilli wrote the law that expanded the earned income tax credit benefiting low wage workers. He initiated the effort to provide tax relief to seniors living on fixed incomes who pay high property taxes, the state's "circuit breaker" law. He also led the effort to restore the capital gains tax in Massachusetts.

Marzilli convened the Olmsted Group on long-term care, to make sure that every person receives the care they need at an affordable price. He has been named "Legislator of the Year" three times for his work in this area, by the Massachusetts Human Services Providers Council, the Association of Developmental Disability Providers and the Alliance for Retarded Citizens.

Marzilli was named "Environmental Legislator of the Year" by the Environmental League of Massachusetts in 2001 for his work linking environmental protection and tax policy. His Green Building Tax Credit would provide tax incentives to builders who use environmentally sound building practices that reduce energy and water consumption, reduce storm water runoff and use non-toxic materials. His Clean Car Initiative would create a sliding scale sales tax based on a vehicle's fuel efficiency.

Marzilli was co-chair of the Energy and Environment Committee of the Council of State Governments. He has participated in four rounds of the Kyoto climate change treaty negotiations of the United Nations and led a delegation of state elected officials to the negotiations in Montreal. He has spoken on energy and environmental policy, and climate change in Canada, Mexico, Argentina, Brazil, Germany, England, Italy, India and China.

Marzilli was the political commentator at New England Cable News TV from 1993 to 1994. He was a frequent guest lecturer at area colleges in public policy and civic participation, most recently teaching "Health Care Policy and Politics" at the Boston University Graduate School of Public Health.

In October 2008, Marzilli was the highest-ranking American official to attend an international conference on global warming sponsored by the Institute for Ecological Economy Research in Berlin, Germany. He also attended a follow-up conference on "New Challenges to Infrastructure Theory and Policy Markets and Planning, Development, and Sustainability". His attendance at these conferences representing the Massachusetts Senate drew criticism from the press and fellow politicians in Massachusetts where he faced charges of sexual assault.

== Conviction for verbally annoying and accosting four people ==
Marzilli was accused of verbally assaulting a woman in Lowell, Massachusetts. In late April, the case was referred to the District Attorney's Office for further investigation. On May 7, Marzilli wrote an email to his supporters, where he declared his innocence and thanked them for their support, but continued to refuse to discuss any details of the case. On May 14, 2008, Middlesex prosecutors dropped the case for lack of sufficient evidence.

On June 3, 2008, Marzilli was involved in a second incident of alleged verbally accosting another woman who was sitting on a park bench. The alleged incident occurred in downtown Lowell, Massachusetts. The Senator made lewd comments and "he tried to touch me". When Lowell Police arrived, Marzilli gave a false name and later led Police on a foot chase that ended in a nearby parking garage. After this arrest, other women came forward to claim Marzilli harassed them the same day, alleging ("The sex is sweet, you want it, and you want to go with me." "Oh baby, you are so beautiful – your butt is perfect."). Boston Herald columnist Howie Carr later reported that the false name given by Marzilli was Marty Walsh, which is the name of at least three people known by Marzilli, including a state representative from Dorchester (now United States Secretary of Labor), a former employee of the late U.S. Senator Ted Kennedy, and a former employee of the U.S. Department of Justice.

On July 1, the Massachusetts State Senate voted 38–0 to refer the Marzilli's alleged misconduct to the Committee on Ethics and Rules, which will not release its findings until after his court cases are resolved.

Throughout the controversy, Marzilli remained in office but did end his reelection campaign in June. However, in November after a controversial trip to Germany to two environmental conferences, Marzilli resigned his office. His seat in the state senate remained open until January 2009, when Kenneth Donnelly, who won the November election for the seat was sworn in.

On June 9, 2010, the Massachusetts Supreme Judicial Court ruled that Marzilli could be prosecuted for "attempted indecent assault and battery".

On February 22, 2011, Marzilli pleaded guilty to all charges against him, including resisting arrest and disorderly conduct, in Middlesex Superior Court and was sentenced to three months in prison. Marzilli's defense had requested a sentence of three years probation, whereas the prosecution was seeking one year imprisonment for Marzilli.

== Psychiatric hospitalization ==
On June 6, 2008, the Boston Herald reported that Marzilli was admitted to a psychiatric hospital. On August 5, 2008, his wife, Susan Shaer, mailed a letter to supporters explaining that he had been diagnosed as suffering from bipolar disorder and the recent events in Marzilli's life had taken place during a period of hypomania.

== Organizations ==
New England Wildflower Society (chairman of the board of trustees); Massachusetts Budget and Policy Center (Board of Directors); California Health Benefits Review Program (Advisory Board); Germaine Lawrence School (Board of Advisors); Boston Democratic Socialists of America (former Chair).

== Public office ==
Arlington Housing Authority, Commissioner (1988–'91); Town Meeting Member (1990–'91); Democratic State Committee (1984–'91); Mass. House (1991–2007); Mass. Senate (2007–2008).

Political offices
Preceded by Robert Havern III	Massachusetts State Representative, 23rd Middlesex District; 1991–2007	Succeeded by Sean Garballey
Preceded by Robert Havern III	Massachusetts State Senator for 4th Middlesex District; 2007–2008	Succeeded by Ken Donnelly
