= Massachusetts Senate's Berkshire, Hampshire and Franklin district =

American legislative district

Berkshire, Hampshire and Franklin was a district of the Massachusetts Senate from 2003 to 2013. It covered the expanse of Berkshire, Hampshire and Franklin counties. It was last represented in the State Senate by Benjamin Downing of the Democratic Party. Until the election of Andrea Nuciforo in 1997, the district had been a Republican stronghold.

== List of senators ==
| Senator | Party | Years | Electoral history |
|---|---|---|---|
| Andrea F. Nuciforo, Jr. | Democratic | 2003 – 2007 | Redistricted from the Berkshire, Hampshire, Franklin, and Hampden district Retired to run for Register of Deeds for the Berkshire Middle District |
| Benjamin Downing | Democratic | 2007 – 2013 | Redistricted to the Berkshire, Hampshire, Franklin, and Hampden district |

== See also ==
- List of former districts of the Massachusetts Senate
