= Edward Augustus (politician) =

American politician

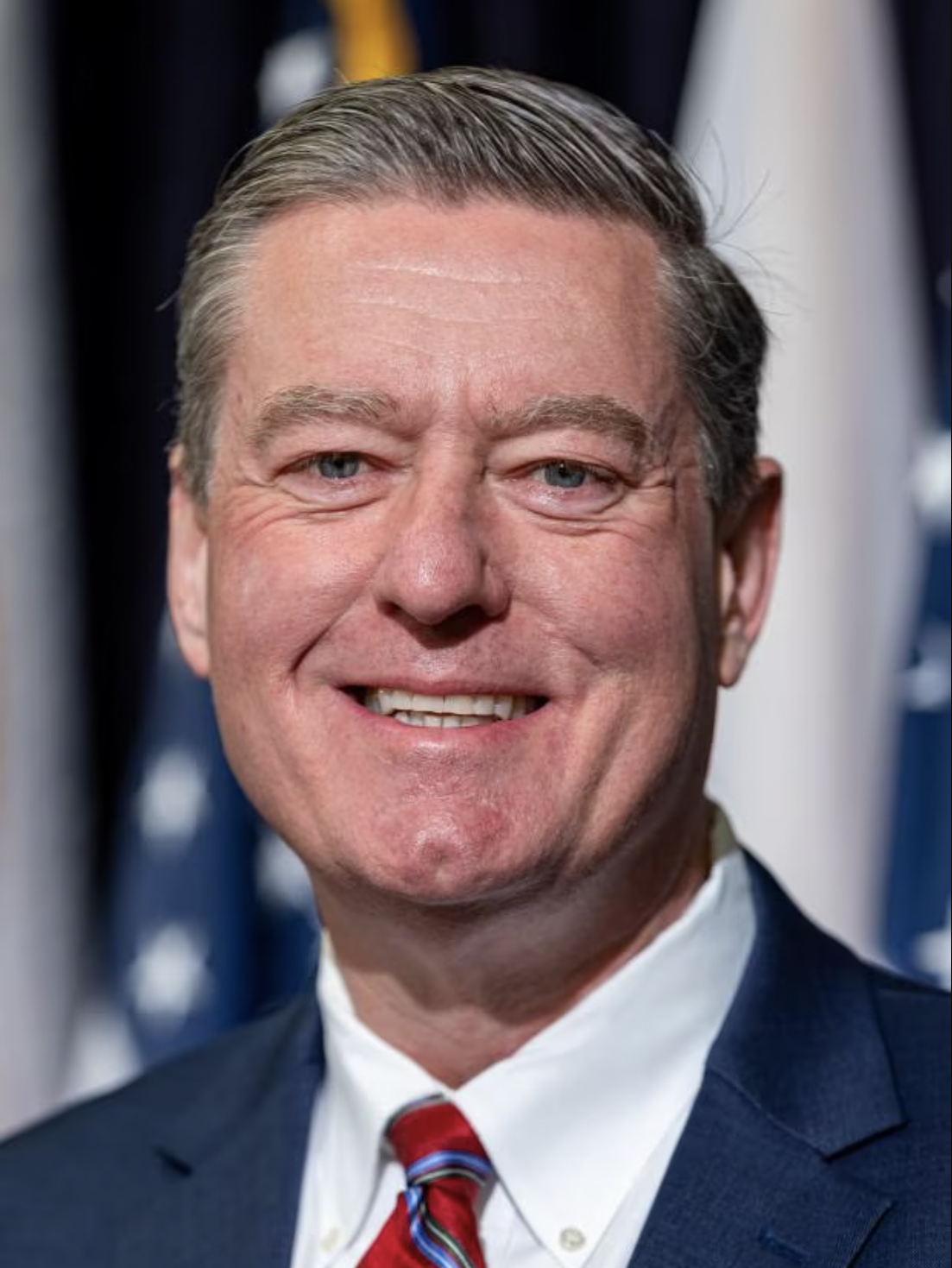
- Official portrait, 2023

Massachusetts Secretary of Housing and Livable Communities
- In office May 15, 2023 – February 27, 2026
- Preceded by: Position established
- Succeeded by: Juana Matias

City Manager of Worcester
- In office 2014–2022
- Preceded by: Michael V. O'Brien
- Succeeded by: Eric Batista

Member of the Massachusetts Senate from the 2nd Worcester district
- In office January 2005 – January 2009
- Preceded by: Guy Glodis
- Succeeded by: Michael O. Moore

Personal details
- Born: March 31, 1965 (age 61) Worcester, Massachusetts, U.S.
- Party: Democratic
- Education: Suffolk University; Johns Hopkins University

Edward M. Augustus Jr. (born March 31, 1965) is an American politician and administrator who is the CEO of UniBank. He was the Massachusetts Secretary of Housing and Livable Communities from 2023 to 2026, City Manager of Worcester, Massachusetts from 2014 to 2022, and a member of the Massachusetts Senate from 2005 to 2009.

== Early life ==
Born at Worcester City Hospital to Edward Augustus Sr. (a machinist) and Dolores (a bank teller), Augustus graduated from St. John's High School in Shrewsbury, Massachusetts in 1983. He went on to Suffolk University, where he graduated with a Bachelor of Arts in political science, and then received a Master of Arts from Johns Hopkins University in Political Science.

== Career ==
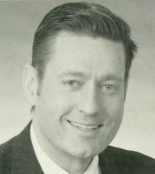
Augustus in 2005

From 1989 to 1993, Augustus served as a member of the Worcester Public Schools School Committee.

After helping to elect Jim McGovern to the United States House of Representatives, Augustus worked in Washington D.C. as Chief of Staff for McGovern. From 2005 to 2009, Augustus represented the 2nd Worcester district in the Massachusetts Senate. After leaving the state senate, Augustus served as executive director of the Children's Defense Fund of California. He left this position in 2010 to run McGovern's re-election campaign. After the election, Augustus became Director of Government and Community Relations at the College of the Holy Cross.

On December 3, 2013, Augustus was named City Manager of Worcester, Massachusetts. Augustus took over as city manager in January 2014. He initially planned to serve for nine months, while on a leave of absence from the college, but accepted a three-year contract extension on September 30, 2014. During his tenure, the city completed a number of infrastructure projects, including the replacement of downtown streets and sidewalks, and spent $160 million to construct Polar Park. On March 22, 2022, Augustus announced that he would be stepping down from his post as City Manager in May 2022.

On June 1, 2022, Augustus was named the first Chancellor of Dean College. In 2023, Augustus was appointed the inaugural secretary of Housing and Livable Communities by Governor Maura Healey. He stepped down on February 27, 2026 to become CEO of UniBank.
