= Stephen Brewer =

American politician

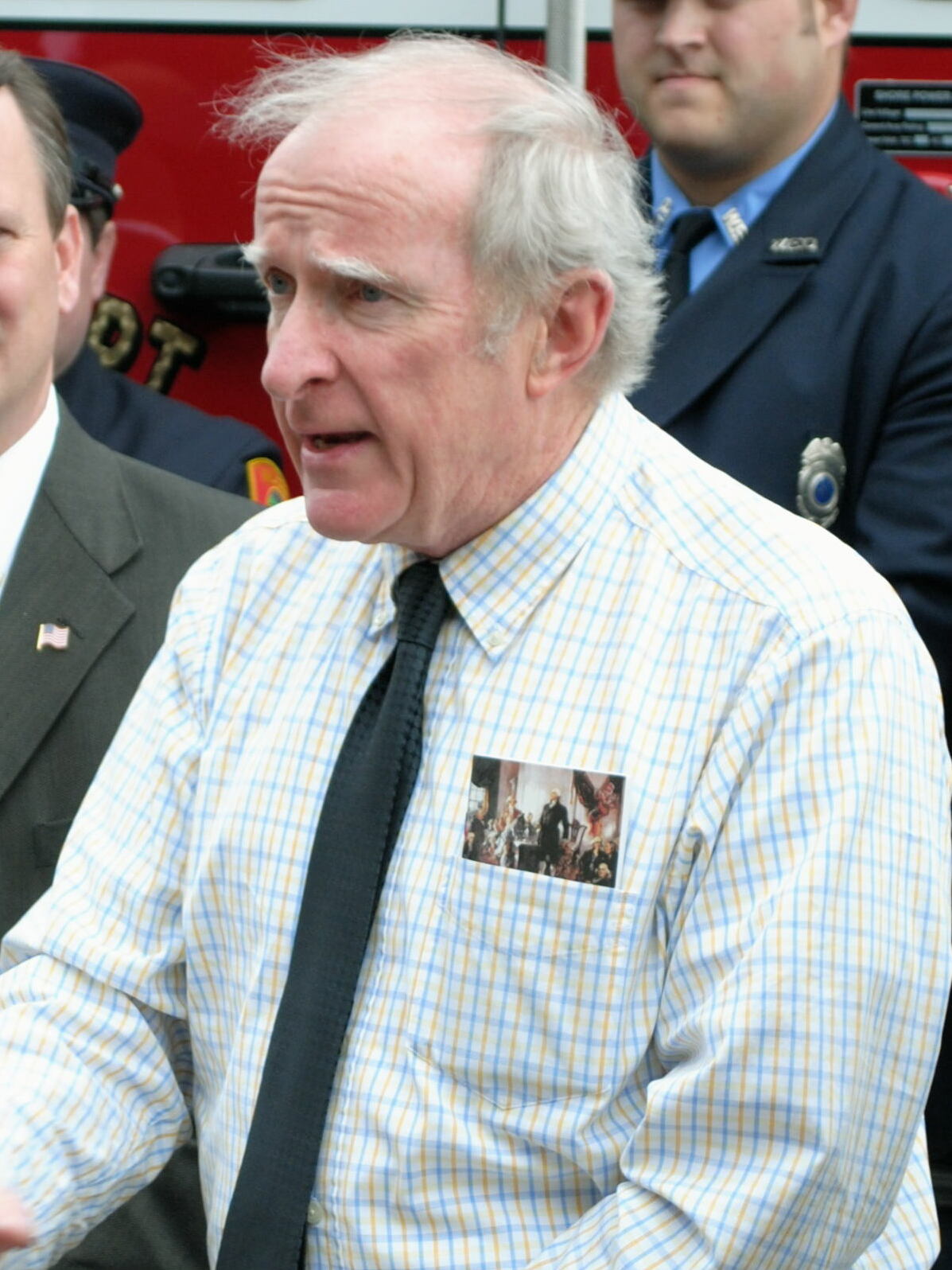
- Brewer in 2010

Member of the Massachusetts Senate, Worcester, Hampden, Hampshire and Middlesex district
- In office 1997–2015
- Preceded by: Robert D. Wetmore
- Succeeded by: Anne Gobi

Personal details
- Born: February 10, 1948 (age 78) Worcester, Massachusetts
- Party: Democratic
- Education: University of Massachusetts Amherst; Assumption College

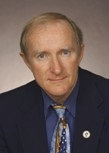
Official portrait

Stephen Brewer is an American politician who served in the Massachusetts Senate from 1997 to 2015.

== Early life ==
Stephen Brewer was born on February 10, 1948, in Worcester, Massachusetts. He was raised in the town of Barre, Massachusetts. He received his B.A. from the University of Massachusetts Amherst in 1971, and his M.A. from Assumption College in 1974.

== Political career ==
Brewer started his political career on the Barre Board of Selectmen, where he served from 1977 to 1984, eventually becoming the board's chairman. He also worked as an aide to state Senator Robert D. Wetmore from 1980 to 1988. He became a member of the Massachusetts House of Representatives in 1989 and moved onto the Massachusetts Senate in 1997, where he served until his retirement in January 2015.

In the state Senate he represented the Worcester, Hampden, Hampshire, and Franklin District. As the Senate Chair for the Joint Committee on Veterans and Federal Affairs, Brewer was instrumental in the passing of the Welcome Home Bill, a comprehensive package for recent combat veterans to come home to as they transition back to civilian life. He also chaired the Senate Committee on Bills in the Third Reading and served as vice-chair of the Joint Public Safety and Homeland Security Committee.

On October 14, 2011, Sen. Brewer opposed a budget amendment by state Rep. James J. Lyons, Jr. (R-Andover) that would have required the Massachusetts Department of Health and Human Services to give a public accounting on state benefits given to immigrants, both documented and undocumented. The amendment died in the resolution phase of the Senate and House versions. Sen. Brewer said, "It was not a Senate priority. I think it needs further study."

Brewer retired from the Senate at the end of his term in January 2015.

== Personal life ==
Brewer practices Catholicism. As of 2009 he resides in Barre with his wife Valerie and two daughters, April and Audrey.

Brewer will be serving as a parade dignitary celebrating the Town of Barre, Massachusetts 250th Anniversary. Brewer will be riding in an old stage coat that was renovated by the Historical Society.

Political offices
Preceded by Steven C. Panagiotakos	Chairman of the Massachusetts Senate Ways and Means Committee; 2011–2015	Succeeded by Karen Spilka
