= Andrea F. Nuciforo Jr. =

American politician (born 1964)

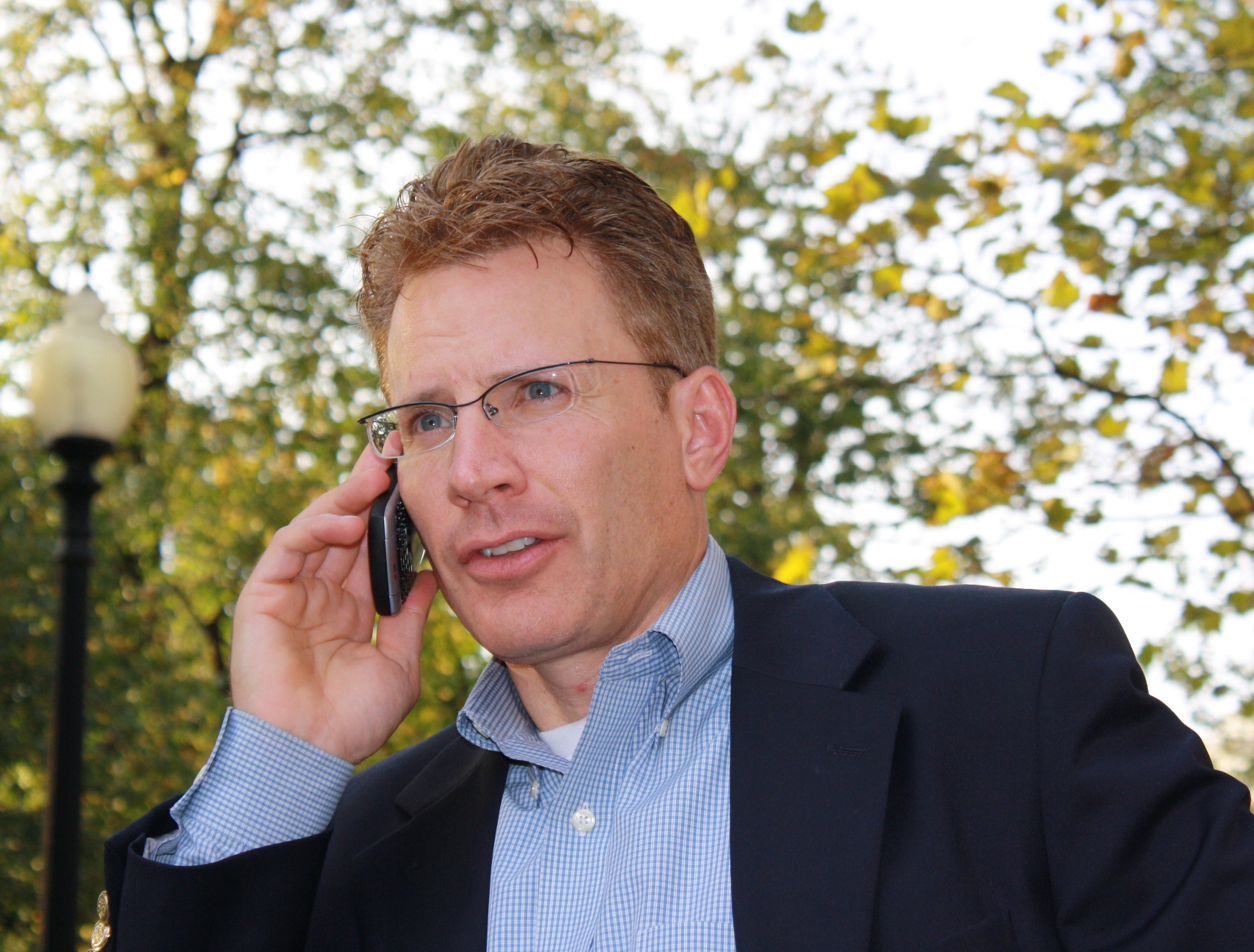

Member of the Massachusetts Senate
- In office 1997 - 2007
- Preceded by: Jane Swift
- Succeeded by: Benjamin Downing
- Constituency: Berkshire, Hampshire, Franklin, and Hampden (1997–2003); Berkshire, Hampshire, and Franklin (2003–2007)

Personal details
- Born: February 26, 1964 (age 62) Pittsfield, Massachusetts
- Party: Democratic
- Spouse: Elena V. Nuciforo
- Children: Eric A. Nuciforo; Maxim A. Nuciforo
- Education: University of Massachusetts Amherst; Boston University; New York University
- Profession: Attorney
- Website: http://www.nuciforo.com

Andrea F. Nuciforo Jr. (born February 26, 1964) served as a Democratic State Senator from January 1, 1997, until January 3, 2007, representing the Berkshire, Hampshire, Franklin, and Hampden and Berkshire, Hampshire and Franklin Massachusetts Senate districts in western Massachusetts. He is an attorney, having practiced law with a focus on commercial real estate, health care, education and business litigation. He ran unsuccessfully for the Democratic nomination of the United States House of Representatives in Massachusetts's newly drawn 1st congressional district on September 6, 2012.

== Early life, education, and career ==
He was educated in the public schools in Pittsfield. He received a baccalaureate degree in English at the University of Massachusetts Amherst (1986). He holds a juris doctor from Boston University Law School, and Master of Business Administration from New York University Stern School of Business.

Upon completing law school, Nuciforo began his career as a law clerk to Frank H. Freedman, chief judge of the United States District Court, District of Massachusetts. Nuciforo served as law clerk until 1992, when he began working as a litigator with the law firm of Posternak, Blankstein & Lund LLP in Boston, Massachusetts.

Nuciforo is a member of the bar in Massachusetts (1989) and New York (1991). He has practiced law, primarily in Massachusetts and New York, since 1992. He also provides merger and acquisition, real estate, strategic communication and other services.

== Massachusetts Senate (1996-2007) ==
=== Elections ===
In 1996, three-term incumbent State Senator Jane M. Swift decided to challenge Democratic U.S. Congressman John W. Olver of Massachusetts's 1st congressional district. Nuciforo ran for the State Senate seat and defeated Republican Paul Babeu, a North Adams City Councilman, 55%-42%.

Nuciforo was re-elected to the state senate in 1998 (unopposed), 2002 (82%), and 2004 (78%).

=== Tenure ===
Nuciforo's objectives have often included providing consumers with protection in financial matters, including auto insurance, homeowners insurance, and mortgage lending. While in the Senate, he authored and the Legislature enacted a bill to restrict predatory lending practices in Massachusetts. He supports lowering the financial barriers to attending college, expanding the availability of health insurance, and providing greater financial support for small cities and towns.

As chair of the Joint Committee on Financial Services, Nuciforo developed expertise in mortgage lending, health care, auto insurance and real estate law.

Nuciforo has been recognized as Massachusetts Legislator of the year by a number of organizations, including the following: the Massachusetts Municipal Association, the Massachusetts Academy of Trial Attorneys, the Massachusetts Association of Jewish Federations, the Environmental League of Massachusetts.

Other groups such as the Massachusetts Equal Justice Coalition, the Massachusetts Library Association, the Affordable Care Today Coalition, the YMCA of Western Massachusetts, the Berkshire County Regional Employment Board, the Western Massachusetts Camp Directors Association, the Berkshire Central Labor Council and the Massachusetts Alliance Education have recognized Nuciforo.

=== Committee assignments ===
Nuciforo served as chair of the Joint Committee on Financial Services, the Joint Committee on Banks & Banking, and as a member of the budget-writing Senate Ways & Means Committee.

== Register of Deeds (2007-2013) ==
In 2006, Nuciforo did not seek re-election to the Massachusetts State Senate, for a sixth term. He was elected to a six-year term as Register of Deeds for the Berkshire Middle District, seated in Pittsfield. He ran unopposed in the Democratic primary and the general election.

== 2012 congressional election ==
In July 2009, Nuciforo filed a statement of candidacy with the Federal Election Commission to initiate a 2012 campaign for Massachusetts' first congressional district.

The newly redrawn Massachusetts's 1st congressional district consists of 86 cities and towns in western and central Massachusetts. Springfield, Chicopee, Pittsfield and Holyoke are major urban centers in the district. Nuciforo's old Senate District as well as his current Register of Deeds District is located entirely within the 1st CD.

Nuciforo formally kicked off his congressional campaign on February 8, 2012, with a district-wide tour and an eight-point plan to restore the middle class. The primary election occurred on September 6, 2012. Incumbent Richard E. Neal won the primary with 65% of the vote. Nuciforo placed second, having won the city of Pittsfield and several Berkshire towns. Humorist Bill Shein finished third with 10%.

== Private Practice and Community Service ==
Nuciforo continues to practice law and consulting, working closely with individual and institutional clients throughout the country. He continues his involvement in the community, including service as a board member of the Berkshire Theatre Group and as a member of the Boston University Law School Executive Committee. He supports a number of non-profit organizations, and a select number of candidates for public office.

In 2015, Nuciforo opened Nuciforo Law Group, with offices in Boston and Pittsfield. The firm provides legal services for individual and business clients, with primary focus on health care, business and real estate law.
