= Robert Havern III =

American politician

Robert Havern III Hon.
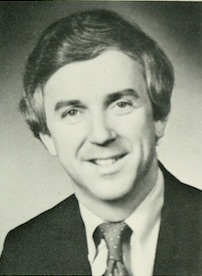

Member of the Massachusetts State Senate for the Fourth Middlesex district
- In office 1991–2007
- Preceded by: Richard A. Kraus
- Succeeded by: Joseph James Marzilli Jr.

Member of the Massachusetts House of Representatives
- In office 1987–1991
- Preceded by: John F. Cusack
- Succeeded by: Joseph James Marzilli Jr.

Member of the Arlington, Massachusetts Board of Selectmen
- In office 1978–1986

Personal details
- Born: July 17, 1949
- Died: July 19, 2014 (aged 65)
- Resting place: Mount Pleasant Cemetery, Arlington, Massachusetts
- Party: Democrat
- Spouse: Maureen C. Crane
- Children: Timothy, Ned
- Education: Harvard College, 1972; Suffolk University Law School

Robert A. Havern III (July 17, 1949 – July 19, 2014), was a Massachusetts politician who served in the Massachusetts House of Representatives and who represented the Fourth Middlesex District in the Massachusetts State Senate from 1991 to 2007.

== Biography ==
Havern attended Harvard where he played on the hockey team from 1970 to 1972.

Havern served as an Arlington Selectman from 1978 to 1986, and as a State Representative from 1987 to 1991. He was elected to the Massachusetts Senate in November 1990. He resigned on August 22, 2007 to join the legal strategies lobbying firm Mintz Levin, as the president of its Massachusetts Government Relations Practice.

== Fourth Middlesex district ==
The Fourth Middlesex District includes the towns of Arlington, Billerica, and Burlington. It also contains six of eleven precincts in Lexington, and six of seven wards in the City of Woburn.

== Recent election results ==
State Senate Fourth Middlesex 2004: Senator Havern defeated Douglas M. Lucente (Republican) of Lexington. Havern (D): 50,139; 66% Lucente (R): 25,572; 34%
