= Bob Hedlund =

American politician

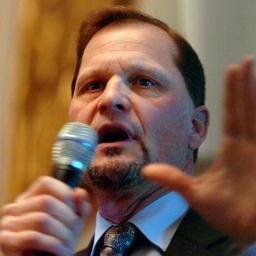

3rd Mayor of Weymouth
- In office January 4, 2016 – July 15, 2025
- Preceded by: Susan M. Kay
- Succeeded by: Mike Molisse

Member of the Massachusetts Senate from the Plymouth and Norfolk district
- In office January 1995 – January 2016
- Preceded by: Brian McDonald
- Succeeded by: Patrick O'Connor
- In office January 1991 – January 1993
- Preceded by: William B. Golden
- Succeeded by: Brian McDonald

Personal details
- Born: July 12, 1961 (age 65) Quincy, Massachusetts, U.S.
- Party: Republican
- Education: Wentworth Institute of Technology; University of Massachusetts Boston; Quincy College
- Occupation: Small business owner

Robert L. Hedlund (born July 12, 1961) is an American businessman and politician serving as the mayor of Weymouth, Massachusetts. He was formerly a member of the Massachusetts Senate representing the Plymouth and Norfolk District.

== Education and career ==
Hedlund attended Wentworth Institute, Quincy College, and University of Massachusetts Boston. Hedlund owned and operated Hedlund Motors located in Quincy, Massachusetts a truck and fire apparatus repair business from 1981 -1992. He was the host of "Monday Night Talk" on WATD-FM 95.9 in Marshfield, Massachusetts, and served as a substitute host on various talk radio shows on WRKO-AM 680 Boston. He served as commissioner of New England Championship Wrestling from 2000-2001.

Hedlund was formerly a member of the Massachusetts Senate who represented the Plymouth and Norfolk District. His former Senate district included Cohasset, Duxbury, Hingham, Hull, Marshfield, Norwell, Scituate, and Weymouth.

On November 3, 2015, Hedlund was elected Mayor of Weymouth with 70% of the vote defeating longtime incumbent Mayor Susan M. Kay. Hedlund assumed office on January 4, 2016.

In November 2019 Hedlund was re-elected as Weymouth Mayor defeating Edward Cowen by a margin of 82% - 18%.

In November 2023 Hedlund was re-elected as Weymouth Mayor defeating Edward Cowen by a margin of 74% - 24%.

== Personal life ==
Hedlund formerly owned and operated the Four Square Restaurant & Bar in Braintree, Massachusetts.
