= Steven Baddour =

American politician (born 1969)

Steven A. Baddour
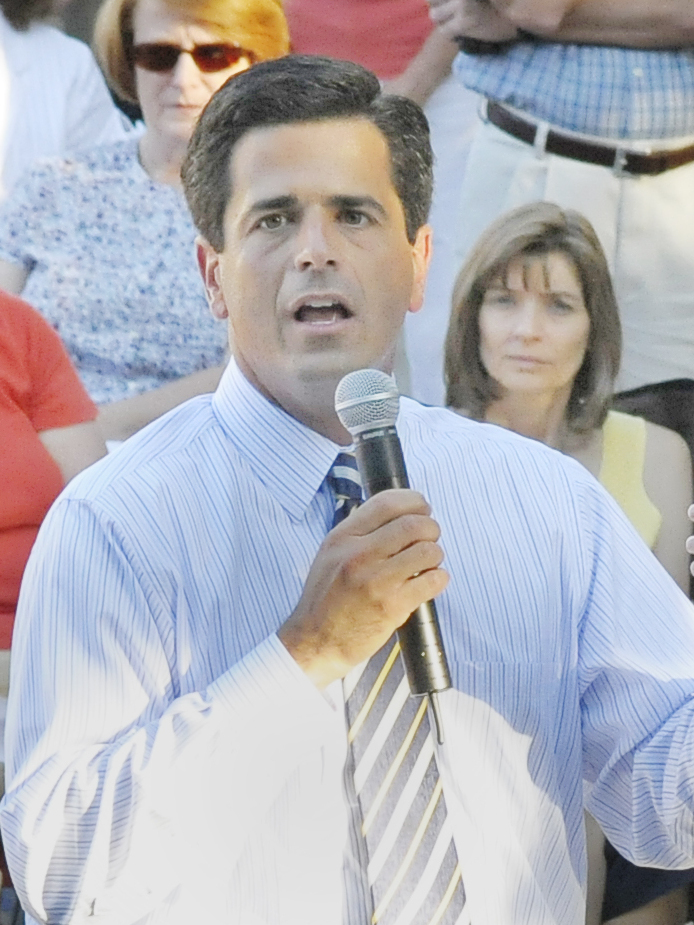
- Baddour in 2008

Member of the Massachusetts Senate from the 1st Essex district
- In office 2002–2012
- Preceded by: James Jajuga
- Succeeded by: Kathleen O'Connor Ives

Personal details
- Born: 1969 (age 56–57)
- Party: Democratic
- Education: University of Massachusetts Dartmouth, Massachusetts School of Law
- Website: stevenbaddour.com

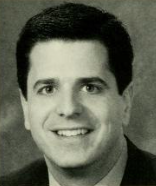
2003 official portrait

Steven A. Baddour (born 1969) is an American attorney and politician from the Commonwealth of Massachusetts. He is a member of the Democratic Party and a former member of the Massachusetts Senate representing the 1st Essex District, which encompasses Amesbury, Haverhill, Merrimac, Newburyport, North Andover, Salisbury, and his hometown of Methuen. Before assuming office in 2002, Baddour worked as an Assistant Attorney General in the Office of the Massachusetts Attorney General.

Baddour served as the Chairman of the Joint Committee on Transportation and Vice-Chairman of the Joint Committee on the Judiciary. He also served as a member of the Joint Committees on Children & Families, Post Audit & Oversight, and Election Laws. Locally, Steve is an active member of the Northeastern Legislative Caucus.

Baddour resigned from the Massachusetts Senate on April 2, 2012 to join McDermott, Will & Emery.
