= Pam Resor =

American politician (born 1942)

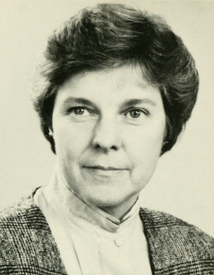

Member of the Massachusetts Senate for the Middlesex and Worcester District
- In office 1999–2009
- Preceded by: Robert Durand
- Succeeded by: Jamie Eldridge

Member of the Massachusetts House of Representatives for the 14th Middlesex district
- In office 1991–1999
- Preceded by: John H. Loring
- Succeeded by: Cory Atkins

Personal details
- Born: February 26, 1942 (age 84) Lincoln, Nebraska
- Party: Democratic
- Education: Smith College

Pamela P. Resor (born 1942) is an American politician who was the Massachusetts State Senator for the Middlesex & Worcester District from her election in 1999 to her retirement in 2009.

Resor attended Smith College in the 1960s. In 1978 she was President of the League of Women Voters. From 1981 to 1987 she was a member of the Acton, Massachusetts board of selectmen.

She was elected to the Massachusetts House of Representatives in 1990 and then was elected to the Massachusetts Senate in a special election in 1999. She served as the Senate Chair of the Joint Committee on Environment, Natural Resources, and Agriculture and the Vice Chair of the Senate Committee on Global Warming and Climate Change.

In early February 2008, Resor announced that she would retire from the Massachusetts Senate at the end of her term. She endorsed Jamie Eldridge, and he succeeded her.
