= Brian Lees =

American politician

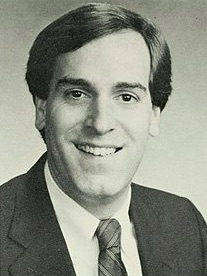

Clerk of Courts for Hampden County
- In office 2007–2013
- Preceded by: Marie Mazza
- Succeeded by: Laura Gentile

Minority Leader of the Massachusetts State Senate
- In office 1993–2007
- Preceded by: David H. Locke
- Succeeded by: Richard R. Tisei

Member of the Massachusetts State Senate from the 1st Hampden and Hampshire district
- In office 1989–2007
- Preceded by: Martin Reilly
- Succeeded by: Gale D. Candaras

Personal details
- Born: July 25, 1953 (age 73) Amesbury, Massachusetts
- Party: Republican
- Education: Salem State College

Brian Paul Lees (born July 25, 1953, in Amesbury, Massachusetts) is a Massachusetts politician, who served as the Clerk of Courts for Hampden County. Until 2007, he had been the State Senator from the First Hampden and Hampshire District and the Massachusetts Senate Minority Leader.

Lees represented the Massachusetts communities of Springfield, East Longmeadow, Hampden, Longmeadow, Ludlow and Wilbraham, in the county of Hampden; and Belchertown and Granby, in the county of Hampshire.

== Biography ==
Lees attended Amesbury High School (class of 1971) and graduated in Bachelor of Business Administration from Salem State College in 1975. Lees was an executive with MeadWestvaco Corporation.

Brian Lees is married to Nancy and they reside in East Longmeadow, Massachusetts.

=== Political life ===
Early in his career, he served as Staff Assistant to U.S. Senator Edward W. Brooke.

In 1986 Lees ran unsuccessfully for U.S. Congress against Congressman Edward Boland, (D), Springfield. Two years later he won an upset victory over Springfield City Council President Frank Keough for the State Senate. Lees survived re-election in 1990 in a race against Democrat Edward Ryan and in 1992 against Timothy Rooke. Lees did not face serious competition after 1992 and had been unopposed in his two previous elections before deciding to retire in 2006.

The leader of the Massachusetts Republican caucus since 1993, Lees was just one of six Republicans in the State Senate in his final term, which is made up of forty senators.

In 2016, Lees announced that he would not vote for Donald Trump.

=== Political alignment ===
A fiscal conservative and social moderate, Lees is considered pro-choice and tends to vote with the gun lobby.

Within the walls of the State House, Lees is known as a consensus builder by creating and sustaining debate in the Senate chamber. Lees was instrumental in the installation of television cameras inside the Senate chamber, so that the proceedings could be viewed by the public.

His yearly "Senior Forum" event drew large crowds of senior citizens.

=== Committee memberships ===
Lees served on the Senate committee on Ethics & Rules, The Judiciary Committee, The Telecommunication Committee, Utilities & Energy Committee and the Tourism, Arts & Cultural Development Committee.

=== Future moves ===
He did not seek a 10th term in the Massachusetts Senate in 2008, instead running for Hampden County Clerk of Courts as a write-in during the Republican primary. He went on to win the general election in November. In early 2012, Lees announced he would not seek re-election, signaling his retirement from the Clerk position and from public office.

== Others ==
He is listed as being Corporator at Springfield YMCA, Springfield Library and Museums Association, Bright Side, and trustee of Willie Ross School for the Deaf
