= Steven C. Panagiotakos =

American politician

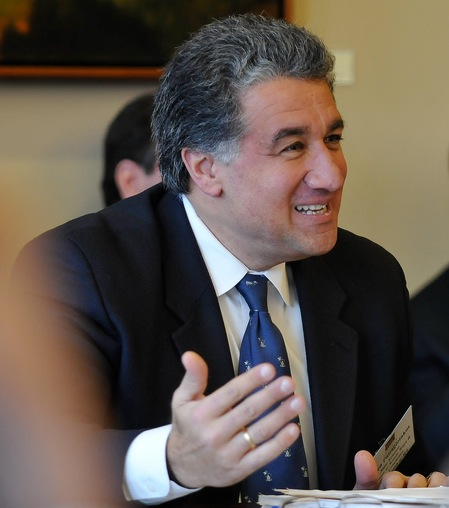
- Panagiotakos in 2009.

Member of the Massachusetts Senate from the 1st Middlesex district
- In office 1997 – January 5, 2011
- Preceded by: Daniel Leahy
- Succeeded by: Eileen Donoghue

Personal details
- Born: November 26, 1959 (age 66) Alexandria, Virginia, United States
- Party: Democratic
- Education: Harvard University (BA); Suffolk University (JD)

Steven C. Panagiotakos is a former Democratic Massachusetts state senator, and was the chairperson of the Senate Ways and Means Committee.

== Early years ==
Panagiotakos was born on November 26, 1959, in Alexandria, Virginia.

== Education ==
Panagiotakos attended high school at Phillips Academy, Andover, in Andover, Massachusetts, graduating in 1978.

Panagiotakos then went to Harvard University graduating with his Bachelor of Arts in 1982, and then went on to Suffolk University Law School, for his Juris Doctor, graduating in 1989.

== Public office ==
- 1990–1993: Lowell School Committee
- 1993–1996: Massachusetts House of Representatives
- 1997–2011: Massachusetts Senate
- On March 29, 2010, a Boston Globe article confirmed that Panagiotakos will not seek re-election.

== Professional career ==
Panagiotakos has been an attorney since 1991, with his own law firm "Law Offices of Steven C. Panagiotakos." and is a member of the Association of Trial Lawyers of America and the Massachusetts Bar Association.

== Other interests ==
Panagiotakos, among other charitable involvements is an Honorary board member of the Big Brothers Big Sisters of Greater Lowell and the Nashoba Valley, as well as Member of the Greater Lowell Alzheimer's Association.

Political offices
| Preceded by Therese Murray | Chairman of the Massachusetts Senate Ways and Means Committee; 2007–2011 | Succeeded by Stephen Brewer |
