= Robert O'Leary =

American politician

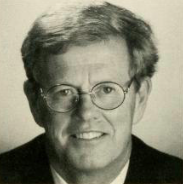
- A portrait of Robert O'Leary

Member of the Massachusetts Senate from the Cape and Islands district
- In office January 3, 2001 – January 5, 2011
- Preceded by: Henri S. Rauschenbach
- Succeeded by: Dan Wolf

Personal details
- Born: Lowell, Massachusetts
- Party: Democratic
- Children: 3
- Education: Georgetown University; Harvard Kennedy School; Tufts University
- Occupation: History Professor

Robert A. O'Leary is a former member of the Massachusetts Senate (D-Barnstable) who served from 2001 to 2011. He was a candidate in the 2010 Democratic primary for Massachusetts's 10th congressional district.

== Early life and career ==
O'Leary was born and raised in Lowell, Massachusetts but has lived in the 10th district for the past 34 years. With jobs ranging from washing dishes to working in hospitals and doing research for the International Association of Fire Fighters, O'Leary then, as a young man, served in the Army Reserve and taught in public schools. O'Leary's educational career lead him to Massachusetts Maritime Academy where he currently teaches as a tenured professor along with an adjunct position at Cape Cod Community College.

== Political history ==
O'Leary was elected as a Barnstable County Commissioner in 1987 and took a role in forming the Cape Cod Commission, a regional planning authority for smart growth started in 1990. O'Leary also participated in the Cape Light Compact which helped combine energy conservation and green energy incentives with consumer protection to change the process by which the area creates and consumes electricity. O'Leary's work on the Cape Cod Land Bank, which focused on environmental and open space preservation was also subsequently used as a model used by communities across Massachusetts to this day.

O'Leary won election to the Massachusetts State Senate in 2000, becoming the first Democrat in his district elected in 40 years and eventually spearheaded the nation’s first ocean management legislation, which allows for harmonious conservation, industry and development in ocean waters. Becoming Chairman of the Higher Education Committee, O'Leary lead in reforming and significantly increasing funds for Massachusetts’ higher education system. O'Leary chaired the Education Committee, and was a chief architect of one of the biggest pieces of education legislation since the Massachusetts Education Reform Act of 1993. It allowed for increased choice and innovation in public school districts.

O'Leary was a candidate in the Democratic Primary for Massachusetts's 10th congressional district, which includes parts of the South Shore of Massachusetts, and includes all of Cape Cod and the islands. O'Leary's candidacy came following the announcement by fellow Democrat Bill Delahunt, who had represented the 10th District in the US Congress since first winning the seat in 1996, of Delahunt not seeking reelection in 2010. O'Leary lost the primary to Norfolk County district attorney William R. Keating.
