= Fred Berry (politician) =

American politician

Frederick Berry
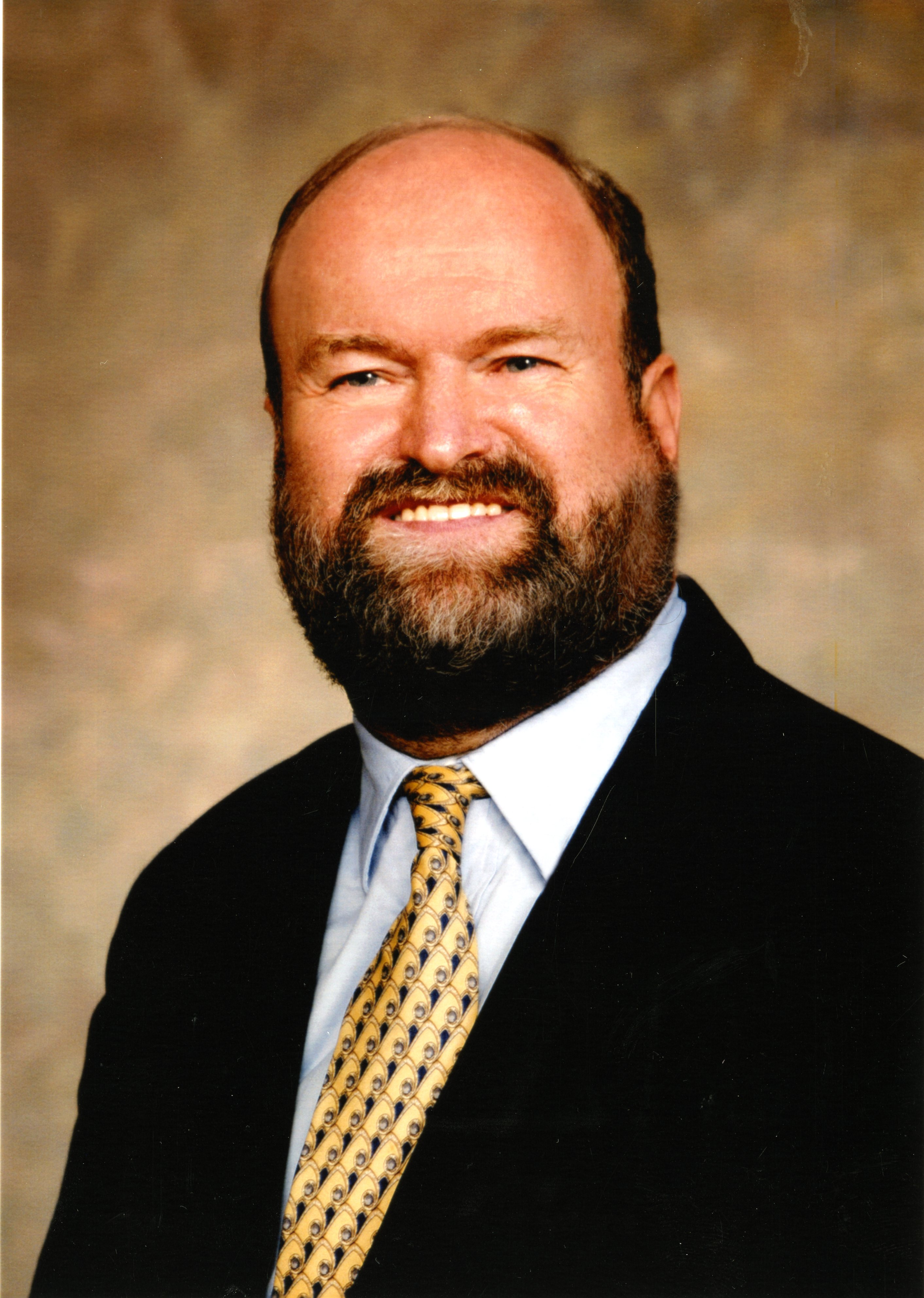

Member of the Massachusetts Senate from the Second Essex district
- In office 1983–2013
- Preceded by: John G. King
- Succeeded by: Joan Lovely

Member of the Peabody City Council
- In office 1979–1983

Personal details
- Born: December 20, 1949 Peabody, Massachusetts, U.S.
- Died: November 13, 2018 (aged 68) Peabody, Massachusetts, U.S.
- Party: Democratic
- Education: Boston College; Antioch College

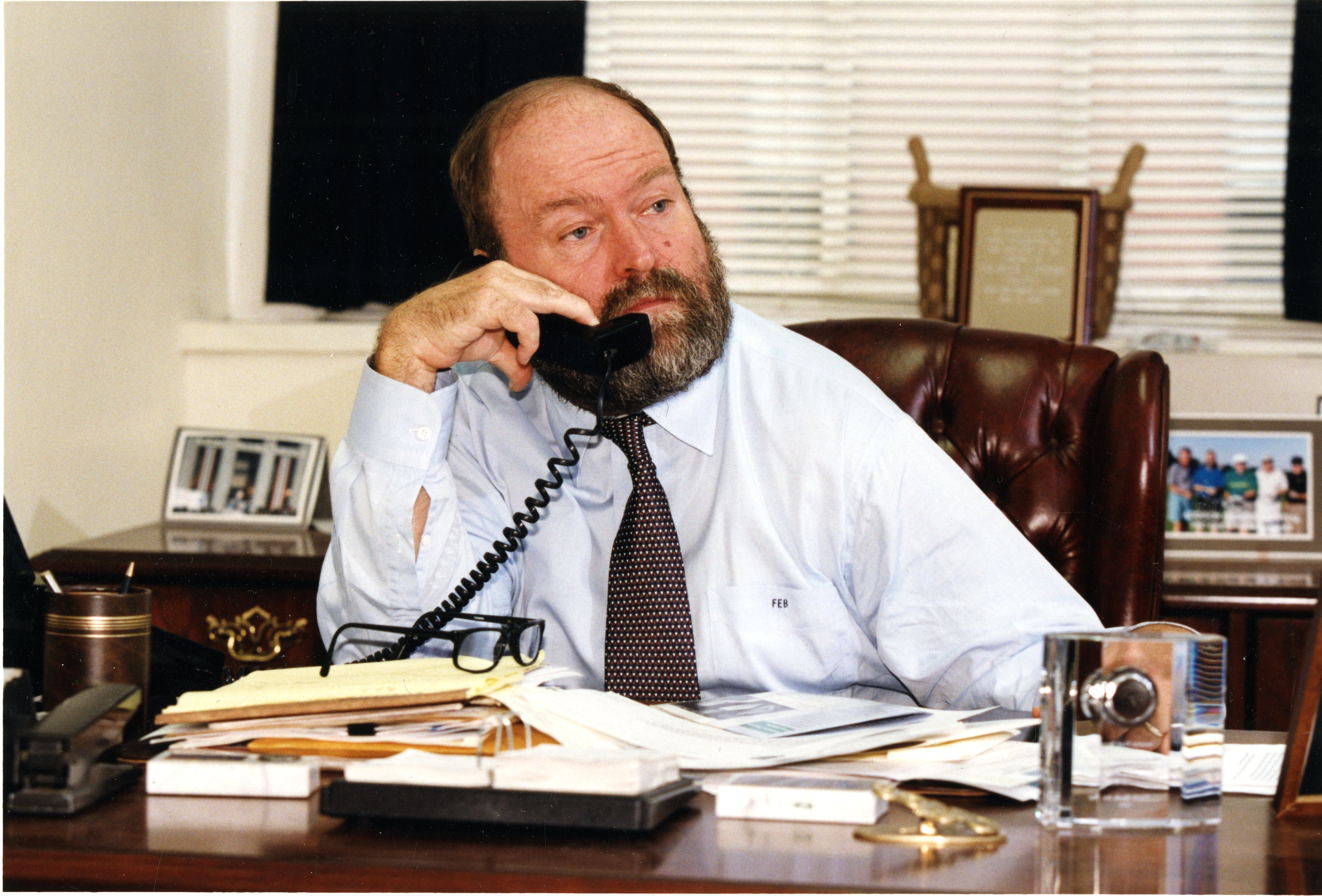
Berry answering a phone call

Frederick E. Berry (December 20, 1949 – November 13, 2018) was a disability rights advocate and Democratic politician from Massachusetts, who served as a member of the Massachusetts Senate from 1983 to 2013. He served as majority leader of the state Senate from 2003 until his retirement in 2013.

== Biography ==
Frederick E. Berry was born in Peabody, Massachusetts, on December 20, 1949. He was a graduate of Bishop Fenwick High School, Boston College (in 1972) and Antioch College, M. Ed. (1974).

After graduating from college, Berry joined VISTA. He was assigned to Corpus Christi, Texas, where he worked with several nonprofits over a 15-month period.

Born with cerebral palsy, Berry returned to Massachusetts and became the director of Heritage Industries, a division of Northeast Arc, which provided employment and job training for those with disabilities.

Before his election to the Senate, Berry was a Peabody City Council member (1979–1983)

Berry, representing Essex County in the State Senate from 1983, was previously Second Assistant Majority Floor Leader (1991–1994) and Assistant Majority Floor Leader (1995–1996), before becoming Majority Leader himself in 2003.

Berry retired from the Senate in 2013. In his retirement, Berry returned to work part-time at Northeast Arc as an ambassador to area businesses.

Berry died on November 13, 2018, at the age of 68.

== See also ==
- 1987–1988 Massachusetts legislature
- 1993–1994 Massachusetts legislature

Political offices
| Preceded by Linda Melconian | Majority Leader of the Massachusetts Senate; 2003–2013 | Succeeded by Stan Rosenberg |
| Preceded by Louis Bertonazzi | Assistant Majority Floor Leader of the Massachusetts Senate; 1995–1996 | Succeeded by Linda Melconian |
| Preceded by Louis Bertonazzi | Second Assistant Majority Leader of the Massachusetts Senate; 1991–1995 | Succeeded by W. Paul White |
