= Mark Montigny =

American politician

Mark C. Montigny
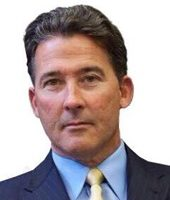

Member of the Massachusetts Senate
- Incumbent
- Assumed office January 6, 1993
- Preceded by: William Q. MacLean Jr.
- Constituency: 2nd Bristol (1993–2003); 2nd Bristol and Plymouth (2003–present)

Personal details
- Born: June 20, 1961 (age 65)
- Party: Democratic

Mark C. Montigny (born June 20, 1961) is a Massachusetts state senator for the Second Bristol and Plymouth district, which includes his hometown of New Bedford and the towns of Acushnet, Dartmouth and Fairhaven in Bristol County, and Mattapoisett in Plymouth County.. He is a Democrat who has served since 1993.

Prior to being elected to the Massachusetts Senate, Montigny was vice chairman of the New Bedford City Democratic Committee. He is the chair of the Committee on Health Care, and has chaired the Senate Committee on Post Audit and Oversight, the chair of the Joint Committee on Health Care, and Intergovernmental Affairs and chair of the Senate Committee on Post Audit and Oversight.

In 2015 Montigny sponsored an animal rights bill, S.878, which set standards for the health and safety of animals in vehicles. The bill passed the Senate unanimously and was signed into law in 2016.

== See also ==
- 2019–2020 Massachusetts legislature
- 2021–2022 Massachusetts legislature

Political offices
| Preceded by Stan Rosenberg | Chairman of the Massachusetts Senate Ways and Means Committee; 1999–2003 | Succeeded by Therese Murray |
