= Joan Menard =

American politician

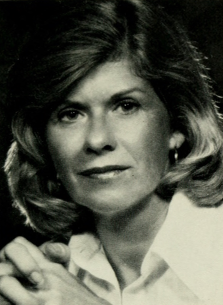
- Official portrait, circa 1983

Member of the Massachusetts Senate from the 1st Bristol and Plymouth District
- In office 2000–2011
- Preceded by: Thomas C. Norton
- Succeeded by: Michael Rodrigues

Member of the Massachusetts House of Representatives from the 5th Bristol District
- In office 1979–2000
- Preceded by: Manuel Raposa
- Succeeded by: Patricia Haddad

Chair of the Massachusetts Democratic Party
- In office 1993–2000
- Preceded by: Steven Grossman
- Succeeded by: Philip W. Johnston

Personal details
- Born: September 6, 1935 (age 91) New York, New York
- Party: Democratic
- Education: Bridgewater State College; Boston College

Joan M. Menard (born September 6, 1935 in New York City) is a retired American politician who also served as the vice president for work force development, lifelong learning, grant development and external affairs at Bristol Community College.

From 1979 to 2000, Menard represented the 5th Bristol District in the Massachusetts House of Representatives. In 1991, she served as the House Assistant Majority Whip and in 1984 and again from 1992 to 1996, she was the Majority Whip.

From 1993 to 2000, Menard served as the Chairman of the Massachusetts Democratic Party.

In 1999, Menard was elected to the Massachusetts Senate; filling the vacancy caused by Thomas C. Norton's appointment to the Massachusetts Low-level Radioactive Waste Management Board. She represented the 1st Bristol and Plymouth District until her retirement in 2011. From 2003 to 2011, Menard was the Senate Majority Whip.

According to the Massachusetts Open Checkbook list of state pensions, Menard is currently receiving a pension from Massachusetts at a rate of $99,297 annually.

Party political offices
Preceded by Steven Grossman	Chairman of the Massachusetts Democratic Party; 1993–2000	Succeeded by Philip W. Johnston
