= List of Massachusetts Senate delegations =

The Massachusetts Senate is the upper house of the Massachusetts General Court, the bicameral state legislature of the Commonwealth of Massachusetts. The Senate comprises 40 elected members from 40 single-member senatorial districts in the state. Descended from the colonial legislature, the current Massachusetts Senate was established in June 1780 upon the adoption of the Massachusetts Constitution. The first General Court met in October 1780 and consisted of one-year elected terms for both houses. This was expanded to two-year terms starting with the 142nd General Court in January 1921. The current delegation is the 191st General Court (2019–2020), consisting of 34 Democrats (D) and 6 Republicans (R).

== 171st to 175th General Courts (1979–1988) ==
In 1977 the Massachusetts Senate districts were redrawn, taking effect with the 171st General Court.

General Court	Berkshire	First Bristol	Second Bristol	Bristol and Plymouth	Cape and Islands	First Essex	Second Essex	Third Essex	First Essex and Middlesex	Second Essex and Middlesex	Franklin and Hampshire	Hampden	First Hampden and Hampshire	Second Hampden and Hampshire	First Middlesex	Second Middlesex	Third Middlesex	Fourth Middlesex	Fifth Middlesex	First Middlesex and Norfolk	Second Middlesex and Norfolk	Middlesex and Suffolk	Middlesex and Worcester	Norfolk	Norfolk, Bristol and Middlesex	Norfolk and Plymouth	Norfolk and Suffolk	First Plymouth	Second Plymouth	First Suffolk	Second Suffolk	Suffolk, Essex and Middlesex	Suffolk and Middlesex	First Suffolk and Norfolk	Second Suffolk and Norfolk	Worcester	Worcester, Franklin, Hampden and Hampshire	First Worcester and Middlesex	Second Worcester and Middlesex	Worcester and Norfolk
171st (1979–1980)	John Fitzpatrick (R)	John F. Parker (R)	Mary L. Fonseca (D)	Robert M. Hunt (D)	John F. Aylmer (R)	Walter J. Boverini (D)	John G. King (D)	Sharon M. Pollard (D)	Robert C. Buell (R)	William X. Wall (D)	John Olver (D)	Stanley J. Zarod (D)	John P. Burke (D)	Alan D. Sisitsky (D)	B. Joseph Tully (D)	Denis L. McKenna (D)	John A. Brennan Jr. (D)	Samuel Rotondi (D)	Carol C. Amick (D)	Edward L. Burke (D)	Jack H. Backman (D)	Francis X. McCann (D)	Chester G. Atkins (D)	Paul D. Harold (D)	David H. Locke (R)	Allan R. McKinnon (D)	Joseph F. Timilty (D)	Anna Buckley (D)	Robert E. McCarthy (D)	William M. Bulger (D)	Bill Owens (D)	Francis D. Doris (D)	Michael LoPresti Jr. (D)	Arthur J. Lewis Jr. (D)	Joseph B. Walsh (D)	Gerard D'Amico (D)	Robert D. Wetmore (D)	Daniel J. Foley (D)	Robert A. Hall (R)	Louis P. Bertonazzi (D)
172nd (1981–1982)	Peter C. Webber (R)	John F. Parker (R)	Mary L. Fonseca (D)	William Q. MacLean Jr. (D)	John F. Aylmer (R)	Walter J. Boverini (D)	John G. King (D)	Sharon M. Pollard (D)	Robert C. Buell (R)	Patricia McGovern (D)	John Olver (D)	Martin T. Reilly (D)	John P. Burke (D)	Alan D. Sisitsky (D)	Philip L. Shea (D)	Denis L. McKenna (D)	John A. Brennan Jr. (D)	Samuel Rotondi (D)	Carol C. Amick (D)	Edward L. Burke (D)	Jack H. Backman (D)	George A. Bachrach (D)	Chester G. Atkins (D)	Paul D. Harold (D)	David H. Locke (R)	Allan R. McKinnon (D)	Joseph F. Timilty (D)	Anna Buckley (D)	Edward P. Kirby (R)	William M. Bulger (D)	Bill Owens (D)	Francis D. Doris (D)	Michael LoPresti Jr. (D)	Arthur J. Lewis Jr. (D)	Joseph B. Walsh (D)	Gerard D'Amico (D)	Robert D. Wetmore (D)	Daniel J. Foley (D)	Robert A. Hall (R)	Louis P. Bertonazzi (D)
173rd (1983–1984)	Peter C. Webber (R)	John F. Parker (R)	Mary L. Fonseca (D)	William Q. MacLean Jr. (D)	Paul V. Doane (R)	Walter J. Boverini (D)	Frederick E. Berry (D)	Sharon M. Pollard (D)	Robert C. Buell (R)	Patricia McGovern (D)	John Olver (D)	Martin T. Reilly (D)	John P. Burke (D)	Linda J. Melconian (D)	Philip L. Shea (D)	Denis L. McKenna (D)	John A. Brennan Jr. (D)	Richard A. Kraus (D)	Carol C. Amick (D)	Edward L. Burke (D)	Jack H. Backman (D)	George A. Bachrach (D)	Chester G. Atkins (D)	Paul D. Harold (D)	David H. Locke (R)	Allan R. McKinnon (D)	Joseph F. Timilty (D)	Anna Buckley (D)	Edward P. Kirby (R)	William M. Bulger (D)	Royal L. Bolling Sr. (D)	Francis D. Doris (D)	Michael LoPresti Jr. (D)	Arthur J. Lewis Jr. (D)	Joseph B. Walsh (D)	Gerard D'Amico (D)	Robert D. Wetmore (D)	Daniel J. Foley (D)	Mary L. Padula (R)	Louis P. Bertonazzi (D)
174th (1985–1986)	Peter C. Webber (R)	John F. Parker (R)	Thomas C. Norton (D)	William Q. MacLean Jr. (D)	Paul V. Doane (R)	Walter J. Boverini (D)	Frederick E. Berry (D)	Nicholas J. Costello (D)	Robert C. Buell (R)	Patricia McGovern (D)	John Olver (D)	Martin T. Reilly (D)	John P. Burke (D)	Linda J. Melconian (D)	Paul J. Sheehy (D)	Salvatore R. Albano (D)	John A. Brennan Jr. (D)	Richard A. Kraus (D)	Carol C. Amick (D)	Edward L. Burke (D)	Jack H. Backman (D)	George A. Bachrach (D)	A. Paul Cellucci (R)	Paul D. Harold (D)	David H. Locke (R)	William B. Golden (D)	William R. Keating (D)	Anna Buckley (D)	Edward P. Kirby (R)	William M. Bulger (D)	Royal L. Bolling Sr. (D)	Francis D. Doris (D)	Michael LoPresti Jr. (D)	Arthur J. Lewis Jr. (D)	Joseph B. Walsh (D)	Gerard D'Amico (D)	Robert D. Wetmore (D)	John P. Houston (D)	Mary L. Padula (R)	Louis P. Bertonazzi (D)
175th (1987–1988)	Peter C. Webber (R)	John F. Parker (R)	Thomas C. Norton (D)	William Q. MacLean Jr. (D)	Paul V. Doane (R)	Walter J. Boverini (D)	Frederick E. Berry (D)	Nicholas J. Costello (D)	Robert C. Buell (R)	Patricia McGovern (D)	John Olver (D)	Martin T. Reilly (D)	John P. Burke (D)	Linda J. Melconian (D)	Paul J. Sheehy (D)	Salvatore R. Albano (D)	John A. Brennan Jr. (D)	Richard A. Kraus (D)	Carol C. Amick (D)	Edward L. Burke (D)	Lois G. Pines (D)	Michael J. Barrett (D)	A. Paul Cellucci (R)	Paul D. Harold (D)	David H. Locke (R)	William B. Golden (D)	William R. Keating (D)	Anna Buckley (D)	Edward P. Kirby (R)	William M. Bulger (D)	Royal L. Bolling Sr. (D)	Francis D. Doris (D)	Michael LoPresti Jr. (D)	Arthur J. Lewis Jr. (D)	Joseph B. Walsh (D)	Thomas P. White (D)	Robert D. Wetmore (D)	John P. Houston (D)	Mary L. Padula (R)	Louis P. Bertonazzi (D)

== 176th to 178th General Courts (1989–1994) ==
In 1987 the Massachusetts Senate districts were redrawn, taking effect with the 176th General Court.

General Court	Berkshire, Franklin, Hampden and Hampshire	First Bristol	Second Bristol	Bristol and Plymouth	Cape and Islands	First Essex	Second Essex	Third Essex	First Essex and Middlesex	Second Essex and Middlesex	Franklin and Hampshire	First Hampden	Second Hampden	Hampden and Hampshire	First Middlesex	Second Middlesex	Third Middlesex	Fourth Middlesex	Fifth Middlesex	Middlesex and Norfolk	Middlesex, Norfolk and Worcester	Middlesex and Suffolk	Middlesex and Worcester	Norfolk	Norfolk and Bristol	Norfolk, Bristol and Middlesex	Norfolk and Plymouth	Plymouth	Plymouth and Barnstable	First Suffolk	Second Suffolk	Suffolk, Essex and Middlesex	Suffolk and Middlesex	First Suffolk and Norfolk	Second Suffolk and Norfolk	Worcester	Worcester, Franklin, Hampden and Hampshire	First Worcester and Middlesex	Second Worcester and Middlesex	Worcester and Norfolk
176th (1989–1990)	Peter C. Webber (R)	Thomas C. Norton (D)	William Q. MacLean Jr. (D)	Theodore J. Aleixo Jr. (D)	Henri S. Rauschenbach (R)	Walter J. Boverini (D)	Frederick E. Berry (D)	Nicholas J. Costello (D)	Robert C. Buell (R)	Patricia McGovern (D)	John Olver (D)	Linda J. Melconian (D)	Brian Lees (R)	John P. Burke (D)	Paul J. Sheehy (D)	Salvatore R. Albano (D)	John A. Brennan Jr. (D)	Richard A. Kraus (D)	Carol C. Amick (D)	Lois G. Pines (D)	Edward L. Burke (D)	Michael J. Barrett (D)	A. Paul Cellucci (R)	Paul D. Harold (D)	William R. Keating (D)	David H. Locke (R)	William B. Golden (D)	Michael C. Creedon (D)	Edward P. Kirby (R)	William M. Bulger (D)	Bill Owens (D)	Francis D. Doris (D)	Michael LoPresti Jr. (D)	Arthur J. Lewis Jr. (D)	W. Paul White (D)	Thomas P. White (D)	Robert D. Wetmore (D)	John P. Houston (D)	Mary L. Padula (R)	Louis P. Bertonazzi (D)
177th (1991–1992)	Jane Swift (R)	Thomas C. Norton (D)	William Q. MacLean Jr. (D)	Erving H. Wall Jr. (R)	Henri S. Rauschenbach (R)	Walter J. Boverini (D)	Frederick E. Berry (D)	James P. Jajuga (D)	Robert C. Buell (R)	Patricia McGovern (D)	John Olver (D)	Linda J. Melconian (D)	Brian Lees (R)	Martin J. Dunn (D)	Nancy A. Sullivan (R)	Charles E. Shannon Jr. (R)	Richard R. Tisei (R)	Robert Havern III (D)	Lucille Hicks (R)	Lois G. Pines (D)	Edward L. Burke (D)	Michael J. Barrett (D)	Robert Durand (D)	Paul D. Harold (D)	William R. Keating (D)	David H. Locke (R)	Robert L. Hedlund (R)	Michael C. Creedon (D)	Edward P. Kirby (R)	William M. Bulger (D)	Bill Owens (D)	Tom Birmingham (D)	Michael LoPresti Jr. (D)	Christoper Lane (R)	W. Paul White (D)	Arthur E. Chase (R)	Robert D. Wetmore (D)	Matthew J. Amorello (R)	Mary L. Padula (R)	Louis P. Bertonazzi (D)
178th (1993–1994)	Jane Swift (R)	Thomas C. Norton (D)	Mark C. Montigny (D)	Marc R. Pacheco (D)	Henri S. Rauschenbach (R)	Walter J. Boverini (D)	Frederick E. Berry (D)	James P. Jajuga (D)	Robert C. Buell (R)	John C. O'Brien (D)	Stanley Rosenberg (D)	Linda J. Melconian (D)	Brian Lees (R)	Shannon O'Brien (D)	Daniel Leahy (D)	Charles E. Shannon Jr. (R)	Richard R. Tisei (R)	Robert Havern III (D)	Lucille Hicks (R)	Lois G. Pines (D)	David Magnani (D)	Michael J. Barrett (D)	Robert Durand (D)	Michael W. Morrissey (D)	William R. Keating (D)	Cheryl Jacques (D)	Bryan MacDonald (D)	Michael C. Creedon (D)	Therese Murray (D)	William M. Bulger (D)	Dianne Wilkerson (D)	Tom Birmingham (D)	Robert Travaglini (D)	Marian Walsh (D)	W. Paul White (D)	Arthur E. Chase (R)	Robert D. Wetmore (D)	Matthew J. Amorello (R)	Robert A. Antonioni (D)	Louis P. Bertonazzi (D)

== 179th to 182nd General Courts (1994–2002) ==
In 1993 the Massachusetts Senate districts were redrawn, taking effect with the 179th General Court.

General Court	Berkshire, Hampden, Hampshire and Franklin	First Bristol	Second Bristol	Cape and Islands	First Essex	Second Essex	Third Essex	First Essex and Middlesex	Second Essex and Middlesex	Hampden	First Hampden and Hampshire	Second Hampden and Hampshire	Hampshire and Franklin	First Middlesex	Second Middlesex	Third Middlesex	Fourth Middlesex	Fifth Middlesex	First Middlesex and Norfolk	Middlesex, Norfolk and Worcester	Middlesex and Suffolk	Middlesex, Suffolk and Essex	Middlesex and Worcester	Norfolk, Bristol and Middlesex	Norfolk, Bristol and Plymouth	Norfolk and Plymouth	Norfolk and Suffolk	Plymouth and Barnstable	First Plymouth and Bristol	Second Plymouth and Bristol	Plymouth and Norfolk	First Suffolk	Second Suffolk	Suffolk and Middlesex	Suffolk and Norfolk	First Worcester	Second Worcester	Worcester, Hampden, Hampshire and Franklin	Worcester and Middlesex	Worcester and Norfolk
179th (1995–1996)	Jane Swift (R)	Thomas C. Norton (D)	Mark C. Montigny (D)	Henri S. Rauschenbach (R)	Edward J. Clancy Jr. (D)	Frederick E. Berry (D)	James P. Jajuga (D)	Bruce Tarr (R)	John C. O'Brien (D)	Linda J. Melconian (D)	Brian Lees (R)	Michael Knapik (R)	Stanley Rosenberg (D)	Daniel Leahy (D)	Charles E. Shannon Jr. (R)	Richard R. Tisei (R)	Robert Havern III (D)	Lucille Hicks (R)	Lois G. Pines (D)	David Magnani (D)	Warren Tolman (D)	Tom Birmingham (D)	Robert Durand (D)	Cheryl Jacques (D)	William R. Keating (D)	Michael W. Morrissey (D)	Marian Walsh (D)	Therese Murray (D)	Marc R. Pacheco (D)	Michael C. Creedon (D)	Robert L. Hedlund (R)	William M. Bulger (D)	Dianne Wilkerson (D)	Robert Travaglini (D)	W. Paul White (D)	Robert A. Bernstein (D)	Matthew J. Amorello (R)	Robert D. Wetmore (D)	Robert A. Antonioni (D)	Louis P. Bertonazzi (D)
180th (1997–1998)	Andrea F. Nuciforo Jr. (D)	Thomas C. Norton (D)	Mark C. Montigny (D)	Henri S. Rauschenbach (R)	Edward J. Clancy Jr. (D)	Frederick E. Berry (D)	James P. Jajuga (D)	Bruce Tarr (R)	John C. O'Brien (D)	Linda J. Melconian (D)	Brian Lees (R)	Michael Knapik (R)	Stanley Rosenberg (D)	Steven C. Panagiotakos (D)	Charles E. Shannon Jr. (D)	Richard R. Tisei (R)	Robert Havern III (D)	Susan C. Fargo (D)	Lois G. Pines (D)	David Magnani (D)	Warren Tolman (D)	Tom Birmingham (D)	Robert Durand (D)	Cheryl Jacques (D)	William R. Keating (D)	Michael W. Morrissey (D)	Marian Walsh (D)	Therese Murray (D)	Marc R. Pacheco (D)	Robert S. Creedon Jr. (D)	Robert L. Hedlund (R)	Stephen Lynch (D)	Dianne Wilkerson (D)	Robert Travaglini (D)	W. Paul White (D)	Robert A. Bernstein (D)	Matthew J. Amorello (R)	Stephen Brewer (D)	Robert A. Antonioni (D)	Richard T. Moore (D)
181st (1999–2000)	Andrea F. Nuciforo Jr. (D)	Thomas C. Norton (D)	Mark C. Montigny (D)	Henri S. Rauschenbach (R)	Edward J. Clancy Jr. (D)	Frederick E. Berry (D)	James P. Jajuga (D)	Bruce Tarr (R)	Susan Tucker (D)	Linda J. Melconian (D)	Brian Lees (R)	Michael Knapik (R)	Stanley Rosenberg (D)	Steven C. Panagiotakos (D)	Charles E. Shannon Jr. (D)	Richard R. Tisei (R)	Robert Havern III (D)	Susan C. Fargo (D)	Cynthia Stone Creem (D)	David Magnani (D)	Steven A. Tolman (D)	Tom Birmingham (D)	Pam Resor (D)	Cheryl Jacques (D)	Jo Ann Sprague (R)	Michael W. Morrissey (D)	Marian Walsh (D)	Therese Murray (D)	Marc R. Pacheco (D)	Robert S. Creedon Jr. (D)	Robert L. Hedlund (R)	Stephen Lynch (D)	Dianne Wilkerson (D)	Robert Travaglini (D)	Brian A. Joyce (D)	Robert A. Bernstein (D)	Guy Glodis (D)	Stephen Brewer (D)	Robert A. Antonioni (D)	Richard T. Moore (D)
182nd (2001–2002)	Andrea F. Nuciforo Jr. (D)	Joan Menard (D)	Mark C. Montigny (D)	Robert A. O'Leary (D)	Edward J. Clancy Jr. (D)	Frederick E. Berry (D)	James P. Jajuga (D)	Bruce Tarr (R)	Susan Tucker (D)	Linda J. Melconian (D)	Brian Lees (R)	Michael Knapik (R)	Stanley Rosenberg (D)	Steven C. Panagiotakos (D)	Charles E. Shannon Jr. (D)	Richard R. Tisei (R)	Robert Havern III (D)	Susan C. Fargo (D)	Cynthia Stone Creem (D)	David Magnani (D)	Steven A. Tolman (D)	Tom Birmingham (D)	Pam Resor (D)	Cheryl Jacques (D)	Jo Ann Sprague (R)	Michael W. Morrissey (D)	Marian Walsh (D)	Therese Murray (D)	Marc R. Pacheco (D)	Robert S. Creedon Jr. (D)	Robert L. Hedlund (R)	Stephen Lynch (D)	Dianne Wilkerson (D)	Robert Travaglini (D)	Brian A. Joyce (D)	Harriette L. Chandler (D)	Guy Glodis (D)	Stephen Brewer (D)	Robert A. Antonioni (D)	Richard T. Moore (D)

== 183rd to 187th General Courts (2003–2012) ==
In 2001 the Massachusetts Senate districts were redrawn, taking effect with the 183rd General Court.

General Court	Berkshire, Hampshire and Franklin	Bristol and Norfolk	First Bristol and Plymouth	Second Bristol and Plymouth	Cape and Islands	First Essex	Second Essex	First Essex and Middlesex	Second Essex and Middlesex	Third Essex and Middlesex	Hampden	First Hampden and Hampshire	Second Hampden and Hampshire	Hampshire and Franklin	First Middlesex	Second Middlesex	Third Middlesex	Fourth Middlesex	Middlesex and Essex	First Middlesex and Norfolk	Second Middlesex and Norfolk	Middlesex, Suffolk and Essex	Middlesex and Worcester	Norfolk, Bristol and Plymouth	Norfolk, Bristol and Middlesex	Norfolk and Plymouth	Plymouth and Barnstable	First Plymouth and Bristol	Second Plymouth and Bristol	Plymouth and Norfolk	First Suffolk	Second Suffolk	First Suffolk and Middlesex	Second Suffolk and Middlesex	Suffolk and Norfolk	First Worcester	Second Worcester	Worcester, Hampden, Hampshire and Franklin	Worcester and Middlesex	Worcester and Norfolk
183rd (2003–2004)	Andrea F. Nuciforo Jr. (D)	Jo Ann Sprague (R)	Joan Menard (D)	Mark C. Montigny (D)	Robert A. O'Leary (D)	Steven A. Baddour (D)	Frederick E. Berry (D)	Bruce Tarr (R)	Susan Tucker (D)	Thomas M. McGee (D)	Linda J. Melconian (D)	Brian Lees (R)	Michael Knapik (R)	Stanley Rosenberg (D)	Steven C. Panagiotakos (D)	Charles E. Shannon Jr. (D)	Susan C. Fargo (D)	Robert Havern III (D)	Richard R. Tisei (R)	Cynthia Stone Creem (D)	David Magnani (D)	Jarrett Barrios (D)	Pam Resor (D)	Brian A. Joyce (D)	Cheryl Jacques (D)	Michael W. Morrissey (D)	Therese Murray (D)	Marc R. Pacheco (D)	Robert S. Creedon Jr. (D)	Robert L. Hedlund (R)	John A. Hart Jr. (D)	Dianne Wilkerson (D)	Robert Travaglini (D)	Steven A. Tolman (D)	Marian Walsh (D)	Harriette L. Chandler (D)	Guy Glodis (D)	Stephen Brewer (D)	Robert A. Antonioni (D)	Richard T. Moore (D)
184th (2005–2006)	Andrea F. Nuciforo Jr. (D)	James E. Timilty (D)	Joan Menard (D)	Mark C. Montigny (D)	Robert A. O'Leary (D)	Steven A. Baddour (D)	Frederick E. Berry (D)	Bruce Tarr (R)	Susan Tucker (D)	Thomas M. McGee (D)	Stephen J. Buoniconti (D)	Brian Lees (R)	Michael Knapik (R)	Stanley Rosenberg (D)	Steven C. Panagiotakos (D)	Charles E. Shannon Jr. (D)	Susan C. Fargo (D)	Robert Havern III (D)	Richard R. Tisei (R)	Cynthia Stone Creem (D)	Karen E. Spilka (D)	Jarrett Barrios (D)	Pam Resor (D)	Brian A. Joyce (D)	Scott Brown (Note: Resigned in February 2010 to join the United States Senate.) (R)	Michael W. Morrissey (D)	Therese Murray (D)	Marc R. Pacheco (D)	Robert S. Creedon Jr. (D)	Robert L. Hedlund (R)	John A. Hart Jr. (D)	Dianne Wilkerson (D)	Robert Travaglini (D)	Steven A. Tolman (D)	Marian Walsh (D)	Harriette L. Chandler (D)	Edward M. Augustus Jr. (D)	Stephen Brewer (D)	Robert A. Antonioni (D)	Richard T. Moore (D)
185th (2007–2008)	Benjamin Downing (D)	James E. Timilty (D)	Joan Menard (D)	Mark C. Montigny (D)	Robert A. O'Leary (D)	Steven A. Baddour (D)	Frederick E. Berry (D)	Bruce Tarr (R)	Susan Tucker (D)	Thomas M. McGee (D)	Stephen J. Buoniconti (D)	Gale D. Candaras (D)	Michael Knapik (R)	Stanley Rosenberg (D)	Steven C. Panagiotakos (D)	Patricia D. Jehlen (D)	Susan C. Fargo (D)	J. James Marzilli Jr. (D)	Richard R. Tisei (R)	Cynthia Stone Creem (D)	Karen E. Spilka (D)	Anthony D. Galluccio (Note: Resigned in January 2010.) (D)	Pam Resor (D)	Brian A. Joyce (D)	Scott Brown (R)	Michael W. Morrissey (D)	Therese Murray (D)	Marc R. Pacheco (D)	Robert S. Creedon Jr. (D)	Robert L. Hedlund (R)	John A. Hart Jr. (D)	Dianne Wilkerson (D)	Anthony Petruccelli (D)	Steven A. Tolman (D)	Marian Walsh (D)	Harriette L. Chandler (D)	Edward M. Augustus Jr. (D)	Stephen Brewer (D)	Robert A. Antonioni (D)	Richard T. Moore (D)
186th (2009–2010)	Benjamin Downing (D)	James E. Timilty (D)	Joan Menard (D)	Mark C. Montigny (D)	Robert A. O'Leary (D)	Steven A. Baddour (D)	Frederick E. Berry (D)	Bruce Tarr (R)	Susan Tucker (D)	Thomas M. McGee (D)	Stephen J. Buoniconti (D)	Gale D. Candaras (D)	Michael Knapik (R)	Stanley Rosenberg (D)	Steven C. Panagiotakos (D)	Patricia D. Jehlen (D)	Susan C. Fargo (D)	Ken Donnelly (D)	Richard R. Tisei (R)	Cynthia Stone Creem (D)	Karen E. Spilka (D)	Anthony D. Galluccio (D)	James Eldridge (D)	Brian A. Joyce (D)	Scott Brown (R)	Michael W. Morrissey (D)	Therese Murray (D)	Marc R. Pacheco (D)	Thomas P. Kennedy (D)	Robert L. Hedlund (R)	John A. Hart Jr. (D)	Sonia Chang-Diaz (D)	Anthony Petruccelli (D)	Steven A. Tolman (D)	Marian Walsh (D)	Harriette L. Chandler (D)	Michael O. Moore (D)	Stephen Brewer (D)	Jennifer Flanagan (D)	Richard T. Moore (D)
187th (2011–2012)	Benjamin Downing (D)	James E. Timilty (D)	Michael Rodrigues (D)	Mark C. Montigny (D)	Dan Wolf (D)	Steven A. Baddour (D)	Frederick E. Berry (D)	Bruce Tarr (R)	Barry Finegold (D)	Thomas M. McGee (D)	James T. Welch (D)	Gale D. Candaras (D)	Michael Knapik (R)	Stanley Rosenberg (D)	Eileen Donoghue (D)	Patricia D. Jehlen (D)	Susan C. Fargo (D)	Ken Donnelly (D)	Katherine Clark (D)	Cynthia Stone Creem (D)	Karen E. Spilka (D)	Sal DiDomenico (Note: Won a special election to succeed Galluccio, and was sworn in May 2010. Re-elected to a full term in the 187th General Court.) (D)	James Eldridge (D)	Brian A. Joyce (D)	Richard Ross (Note: Won a special election to succeed Brown, and was sworn in May 2010. Re-elected to a full term in the 187th General Court.) (R)	John Keenan (D)	Therese Murray (D)	Marc R. Pacheco (D)	Thomas P. Kennedy (D)	Robert L. Hedlund (R)	John A. Hart Jr. (D)	Sonia Chang-Diaz (D)	Anthony Petruccelli (D)	Steven A. Tolman (D)	Michael F. Rush (D)	Harriette L. Chandler (D)	Michael O. Moore (D)	Stephen Brewer (D)	Jennifer Flanagan (D)	Richard T. Moore (D)

== 188th to 192nd General Courts (2013–2023) ==
In 2011 the Massachusetts Senate districts were redrawn, taking effect with the 188th General Court.

General Court	Berkshire, Hampshire, Franklin and Hampden	Bristol and Norfolk	First Bristol and Plymouth	Second Bristol and Plymouth	Cape and Islands	First Essex	Second Essex	First Essex and Middlesex	Second Essex and Middlesex	Third Essex	Hampden	First Hampden and Hampshire	Second Hampden and Hampshire	Hampshire, Franklin and Worcester	First Middlesex	Second Middlesex	Third Middlesex	Fourth Middlesex	Fifth Middlesex	First Middlesex and Norfolk	Second Middlesex and Norfolk	Middlesex and Suffolk	Middlesex and Worcester	Norfolk, Bristol and Middlesex	Norfolk, Bristol and Plymouth	Norfolk and Plymouth	Norfolk and Suffolk	Plymouth and Barnstable	First Plymouth and Bristol	Second Plymouth and Bristol	Plymouth and Norfolk	First Suffolk	Second Suffolk	First Suffolk and Middlesex	Second Suffolk and Middlesex	First Worcester	Second Worcester	Worcester, Hampden, Hampshire and Franklin	Worcester and Middlesex	Worcester and Norfolk
188th (2013–2014)	Benjamin Downing (D)	James E. Timilty (Note: Resigned in April 2017 to become Treasurer of Norfolk County.) (D)	Michael Rodrigues (D)	Mark Montigny (D)	Dan Wolf (D)	Kathleen O'Connor Ives (D)	Joan Lovely (D)	Bruce Tarr (R)	Barry Finegold (D)	Thomas M. McGee (D)	James T. Welch (D)	Gale D. Candaras (D)	Donald Humason Jr. (R)	Stan Rosenberg (Note: Resigned in May 2018.) (D)	Eileen Donoghue (D)	Patricia D. Jehlen (D)	Michael J. Barrett (D)	Ken Donnelly (D)	Katherine Clark (D)	Cynthia Creem (D)	Karen Spilka (D)	Sal DiDomenico (D)	Jamie Eldridge (D)	Richard Ross (R)	Brian Joyce (D)	John Keenan (D)	Michael Rush (D)	Therese Murray (D)	Marc R. Pacheco (D)	Thomas P. Kennedy (D)	Robert Hedlund (R)	Linda Forry (D)	Sonia Chang-Díaz (D)	Anthony Petruccelli (D)	Will Brownsberger (D)	Harriette Chandler (D)	Michael O. Moore (D)	Stephen Brewer (D)	Jennifer Flanagan (D)	Richard T. Moore (D)
189th (2015–2016)	Benjamin Downing (D)	James E. Timilty (D)	Michael Rodrigues (D)	Mark Montigny (D)	Dan Wolf (D)	Kathleen O'Connor Ives (D)	Joan Lovely (D)	Bruce Tarr (R)	Barbara L'Italien (D)	Thomas M. McGee (D)	James T. Welch (D)	Eric Lesser (D)	Donald Humason Jr. (R)	Stan Rosenberg (D)	Eileen Donoghue (D)	Patricia D. Jehlen (D)	Michael J. Barrett (D)	Ken Donnelly (D)	Jason Lewis (D)	Cynthia Creem (D)	Karen Spilka (D)	Sal DiDomenico (D)	Jamie Eldridge (D)	Richard Ross (R)	Brian Joyce (D)	John Keenan (D)	Michael Rush (D)	Vinny deMacedo (R)	Marc R. Pacheco (D)	Michael Brady (D)	Patrick O'Connor (R)	Linda Forry (D)	Sonia Chang-Díaz (D)	Joseph Boncore (D)	Will Brownsberger (D)	Harriette Chandler (D)	Michael O. Moore (D)	Anne Gobi (D)	Jennifer Flanagan (D)	Ryan Fattman (R)
190th (2017–2018)	Adam G. Hinds (D)	James E. Timilty (D)	Michael Rodrigues (D)	Mark Montigny (D)	Julian Cyr (D)	Kathleen O'Connor Ives (D)	Joan Lovely (D)	Bruce Tarr (R)	Barbara L'Italien (D)	Thomas M. McGee (D)	James T. Welch (D)	Eric Lesser (D)	Donald Humason Jr. (R)	Stan Rosenberg (D)	Eileen Donoghue (D)	Patricia D. Jehlen (D)	Michael J. Barrett (D)	Ken Donnelly (D)	Jason Lewis (D)	Cynthia Creem (D)	Karen Spilka (D)	Sal DiDomenico (D)	Jamie Eldridge (D)	Richard Ross (R)	Walter Timilty (D)	John Keenan (D)	Michael Rush (D)	Vinny deMacedo (R)	Marc R. Pacheco (D)	Michael Brady (D)	Patrick O'Connor (R)	Linda Forry (D)	Sonia Chang-Díaz (D)	Joseph Boncore (D)	Will Brownsberger (D)	Harriette Chandler (D)	Michael O. Moore (D)	Anne Gobi (D)	Jennifer Flanagan (D)	Ryan Fattman (R)
191st (2019–2020)	Adam G. Hinds (D)	Paul Feeney (Note: Won a special election to succeed Timilty, and was sworn in October 2017. Re-elected to a full term in the 191st General Court.) (D)	Michael Rodrigues (D)	Mark Montigny (D)	Julian Cyr (D)	Diana DiZoglio (D)	Joan Lovely (D)	Bruce Tarr (R)	Barry Finegold (D)	Brendan Crighton (D)	James T. Welch (D)	Eric Lesser (D)	Donald Humason Jr. (R)	Jo Comerford (D)	Ed Kennedy (D)	Patricia D. Jehlen (D)	Michael J. Barrett (D)	Cindy Friedman (D)	Jason Lewis (D)	Cynthia Creem (D)	Karen Spilka (D)	Sal DiDomenico (D)	Jamie Eldridge (D)	Becca Rausch (D)	Walter Timilty (D)	John Keenan (D)	Michael Rush (D)	Vinny deMacedo (R)	Marc R. Pacheco (D)	Michael Brady (D)	Patrick O'Connor (R)	Nick Collins (D)	Sonia Chang-Díaz (D)	Joseph Boncore (D)	Will Brownsberger (D)	Harriette Chandler (D)	Michael O. Moore (D)	Anne Gobi (D)	Dean Tran (R)	Ryan Fattman (R)
192nd (2021–2022)	Adam G. Hinds (D)	Paul Feeney (D)	Michael Rodrigues (D)	Mark Montigny (D)	Julian Cyr (D)	Diana DiZoglio (D)	Joan Lovely (D)	Bruce Tarr (R)	Barry Finegold (D)	Brendan Crighton (D)	Adam Gomez (D)	Eric Lesser (D)	Donald Humason Jr. (R)	Jo Comerford (D)	Ed Kennedy (D)	Patricia D. Jehlen (D)	Michael J. Barrett (D)	Cindy Friedman (D)	Jason Lewis (D)	Cynthia Creem (D)	Karen Spilka (D)	Sal DiDomenico (D)	Jamie Eldridge (D)	Becca Rausch (D)	Walter Timilty (D)	John Keenan (D)	Michael Rush (D)	Vinny deMacedo (R)	Marc R. Pacheco (D)	Michael Brady (D)	Patrick O'Connor (R)	Nick Collins (D)	Sonia Chang-Díaz (D)	Joseph Boncore (D)	Will Brownsberger (D)	Harriette Chandler (D)	Michael O. Moore (D)	Anne Gobi (D)	John Cronin (D)	Ryan Fattman (R)

== See also ==
- List of former districts of the Massachusetts Senate
- List of Massachusetts General Courts

== Sources ==
- Mass.gov: Legislature website
- Sec.state.ma: Election results
- Mass.gov: Burrill Collection
