= Patricia D. Jehlen =

American politician (1943 - )

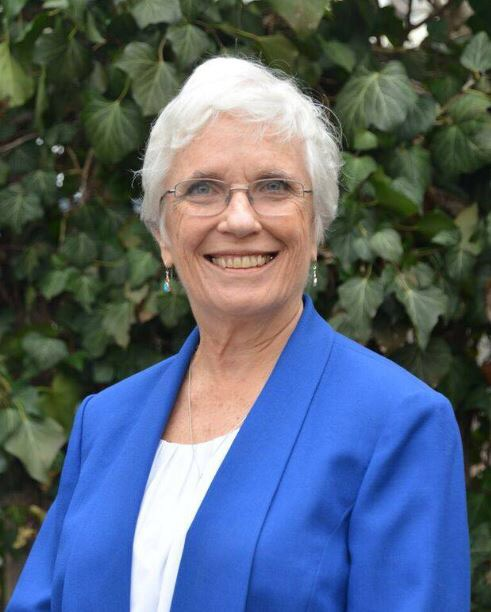

Member of the Massachusetts Senate from the 2nd Middlesex district
- Incumbent
- Assumed office October 12, 2005
- Preceded by: Charles E. Shannon Jr.

Member of the Massachusetts House of Representatives
- In office 1991–2003
- Preceded by: Joseph Mackey
- Succeeded by: Denise Provost
- Constituency: 30th Middlesex (1991–2003); 27th Middlesex (2003–05)

Personal details
- Born: October 14, 1943 (age 82) Austin, Texas
- Party: Democratic
- Education: Swarthmore College; Harvard University; University of Massachusetts Boston

Patricia Deats Jehlen is an American politician and former teacher who has represented the 2nd Middlesex district in the Massachusetts Senate since 2005. She is a member of the Democratic Party. Her district includes the cities of Medford and Somerville, and parts of the city of Cambridge and the town of Winchester. She previously served in the Massachusetts House of Representatives from 1991 to 2003. She announced in December 2025 she would not be running for re-election in 2026.

== Early life and education ==
She was born October 14, 1943, in Austin, Texas, the first child of Paul Deats, a Methodist minister, and Ruth, a community activist and Girl Scout leader. She has two younger sisters, Carolyn and Fran, and a younger brother, Randy. The family moved to Massachusetts in 1950, when Paul took a job at the Boston University School of Theology.

Jehlen later attended Swarthmore College, receiving a B.A. in history, and Harvard University, completing a master's degree in teaching. She later received a second master's degree from the University of Massachusetts Boston, in history. She currently taught a course in Health Politics and Public Policy at the Boston University School of Public Health. Jehlen began her career as a secondary school history teacher.

== Somerville School Committee ==
In 1976, Jehlen ran and was elected to the Somerville School Committee. She was on the school committee until 1991.

== Massachusetts House of Representatives ==
Jehlen served from 1991 to 2005 in the Massachusetts House of Representatives.

== Massachusetts Senate ==
The Massachusetts Senate seat for the 2nd Middlesex district became open on April 5, 2004, following the death of Senator Charlie Shannon. A special election was soon declared to fill his seat. Jehlen, whose state house district lay within the senate district vacated by Shannon, entered the race. Jehlen staked out her position early as "the progressive", with the support of a plethora of unions and statewide and national progressive organizations, including MassEquality, SEIU, and Democracy for America. Although the race was considered wide open, with expectations that any of the four candidates could win, Jehlen won a substantial victory in the August 30th primary:

- 38% Pat Jehlen
- 27% Joe Mackey
- 22% Michael Callahan
- 13% Paul Casey

She went on to defeat Republican candidate William White, Somerville alderman-at-large, in the general election on September 27, 2005, and was sworn in by Governor Mitt Romney on October 12.

In the Massachusetts gubernatorial election, 2014, Jehlen endorsed Don Berwick for Governor of Massachusetts

In the Democratic Party presidential primaries, 2016, Jehlen endorsed Bernie Sanders.

In the 2016 democratic primary, Jehlen won against Leland Cheung, 80% to 20%

In 2025, Jehlen opposed construction of a two-building dorm at 401 Boston Ave. to house nearly 700 Tufts upperclassmen.

Jehlen announced her retirement in December 2025, stating "But I’ve been in the Senate for 20 years, and it’s time to move on. I won’t be running for re-election next year."

== See also ==
- Massachusetts Senate
- List of Massachusetts Senate delegations
- 2019–2020 Massachusetts legislature
- 2021–2022 Massachusetts legislature
