= Ann-Margaret Ferrante =

American politician (1972–2025)

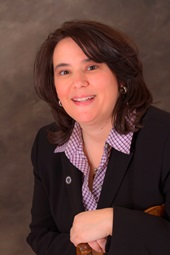

Member of the Massachusetts House of Representatives from the 5th Essex district
- In office January 7, 2009 – November 27, 2025
- Preceded by: Anthony Verga
- Succeeded by: Andrew Tarr

Personal details
- Born: June 26, 1972 Gloucester, Massachusetts, U.S.
- Died: November 27, 2025 (aged 53)
- Party: Democratic
- Education: Tufts University (BS); Suffolk University (JD); Harvard University (MPA)
- Occupation: Attorney; politician

Ann-Margaret Ferrante (June 26, 1972 – November 27, 2025) was an American legislator in the Massachusetts House of Representatives, representing the 5th Essex district, which consists of Gloucester, Rockport, and Essex. A member of the Democratic Party, she was first elected in 2008 after defeating incumbent representative Anthony Verga in the Democratic primary. At the time of her death, she was the Vice Chair of the House Committee on Ways and Means and sat on the House Committee on Post Audit and Oversight, House Committee on Operations, Facilities and Building Security, and the House Committee on Steering, Policy and Scheduling. She was also co-chair of the Tech Hub Caucus, which focuses on fostering growth of Massachusetts’ high-tech businesses and startups.

A graduate of Tufts University with a major in Economics & International Relations, she furthered her education at Suffolk Law School. After graduating from law school, she practiced law in Gloucester and Rockport, specializing in fisheries issues. She served on numerous boards and commissions in the community, including Cape Ann Commercial Fisherman’s Loan Fund, Sawyer Free Library, and as an incorporator with Cape Ann Savings Bank.

== Early life, education and career ==
Ann-Margaret Ferrante was born on June 26, 1972, in Gloucester, Massachusetts. Her mother was a librarian in the local high school, and her father became a fisherman in Gloucester after immigrating from Sicily. She graduated from Gloucester High School and went on to study Economics and International Relations at Tufts University in Boston.

After receiving her Bachelor of Arts in 1994 from Tufts University, Ferrante went to work as the legislative aide for State Representative Bruce Tarr. In 1996, she left her position with Tarr in order to pursue a Juris Doctor from Suffolk University Law School. Ferrante was admitted to the Massachusetts Bar Association in 1999. Shortly after graduating from Suffolk Law, Ferrante started her own law firm in Gloucester, where she focused on land use and fishing issues. She also served as counsel for the Northeast Seafood Coalition, where she began working to reform the regulatory practices affecting commercial fisherman. Ferrante held a Master of Public Administration from the John F. Kennedy School of Government at Harvard University.

== Massachusetts House of Representatives ==
=== Elections ===
2008

Ferrante first ran for State Representative in 2008, challenging incumbent Democrat Anthony Verga on a platform of promoting Gloucester's port as a state asset, advocating sustainable regulations for the fishing industry, encouraging research and investment in education and workforce training, as well as many other issues affecting residents of the 5th Essex District. She received 46.9% of the vote in the Democratic primary, compared to Verga's 39.8%, with Gloucester attorney Astrid AfKlinteberg taking 13.3% of vote.

In the general election, Verga mounted a write-in campaign to retain his seat, but was defeated by Ferrante by a large margin.

2010

In 2010, Ferrante defeated Gloucester business consultant Janet Holmes, a Republican, to win a second term in the Massachusetts House of Representatives with 7,485 votes to Holmes' 4,078.

2012

Ferrante ran unopposed in 2012 and was re-elected to a third term in the Massachusetts House of Representatives.

2014

In 2014, Ferrante defeated former Rockport selectman and financial adviser Michael Boucher, a Republican, to win a fourth term in the Massachusetts House of Representatives with 6,490 votes against Boucher's 4,279.

2016

Ferrante ran unopposed in 2016 and was re-elected to a fifth term in the Massachusetts House of Representatives.

2018

In 2018, Ferrante defeated Rockport Department of Public Works Commissioner and retired management consultant James Gardner, an independent, to win a sixth term in the Massachusetts House of Representatives with 13,551 votes against Gardner's 5,422.

2020

Ferrante ran unopposed in 2020 and was re-elected to a seventh term in the Massachusetts House of Representatives.

=== Tenure ===
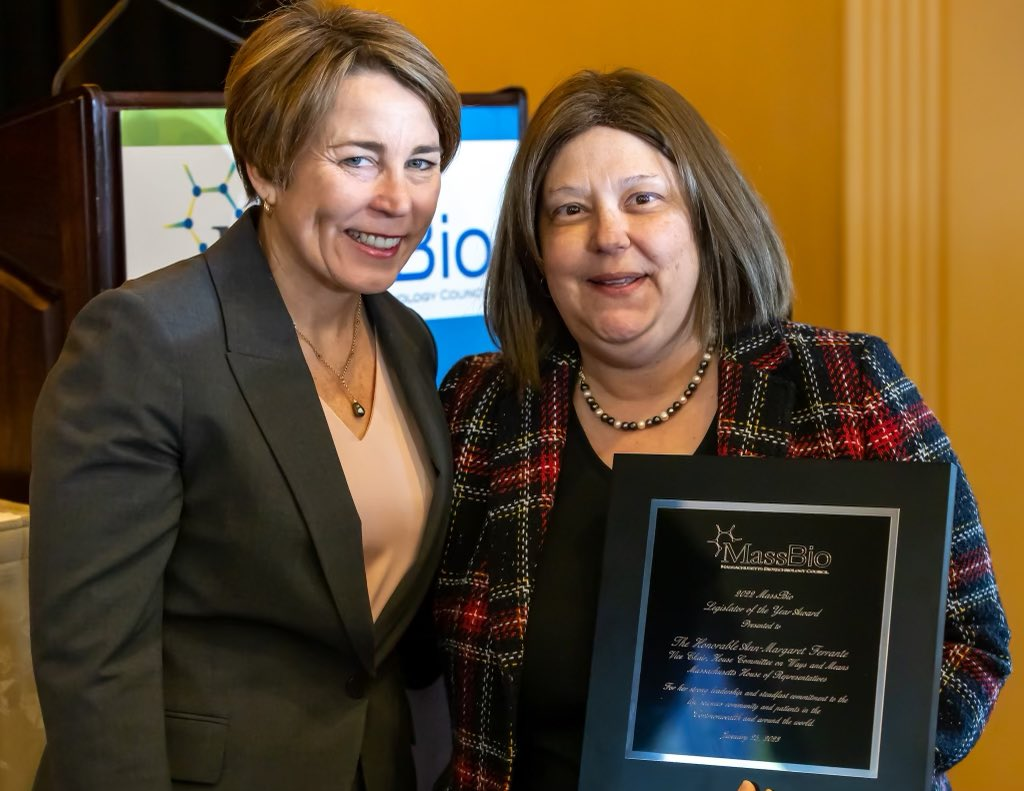
Ferrante with Governor Maura Healey in 2023, after Ferrante received the MassBio "Legislator of the Year" award

Ferrante was the Vice Chair of the House Committee on Ways and Means and sat on the House Committee on Post Audit and Oversight, House Committee on Operations, Facilities and Building Security, and the House Committee on Steering, Policy and Scheduling. She was also co-chair of the Tech-Hub Caucus. During her time in the Massachusetts House of Representatives, Ferrante served as the First Division Chair of the Massachusetts House of Representatives, House Chair of the Joint Committee on Economic Development and Emerging Technologies, House Chair of the Joint Committee on Community Development and Small Businesses, House Vice Chair of the Joint Committee on Environment, Natural Resources and Agriculture, House Vice Chair for the Joint Committee on Economic Development and Emerging Technologies, and as a member of several committees.

== Death ==
Ferrante died from pancreatic cancer on November 27, 2025, at the age of 53.

== See also ==
- 2019–2020 Massachusetts legislature
- 2021–2022 Massachusetts legislature
