= Philip Day =

Philip Day may refer to:

- Philip Day (businessman) (born 1965), billionaire and CEO of Edinburgh Woollen Mill
- Philip J Day, British documentary film director
- Philip R. Day (born 1945), former Chancellor of City College of San Francisco
- Phil Day (town planner) (1924–2011), Australian town planner and politician
- Phil Day (artist) (born 1973), Australian artist
