= Leland Cheung =

American politician

Cambridge City Councillor
- In office 2009 – December 2017

Personal details
- Born: c. 1978 (age 46–47)
- Political party: Democratic Party
- Children: 1
- Education: Stanford University (BS, BA, MS); Harvard University (MPA); MIT (MBA)
- Website: Official website (archive)

Leland Cheung (born c. 1978) is a former City Councillor in Cambridge, Massachusetts. He served from 2009-2017.

== Education and career ==
Cheung was first elected to the Cambridge City Council in 2009 while pursuing a Masters in Public Administration at the Harvard Kennedy School of Government and an MBA at the MIT Sloan School of Management. Prior to returning to graduate school, Cheung earned a BS in Physics, BA in Economics and MS in Aerospace Engineering from Stanford University. Following graduation, Cheung worked as a Senior Associate at Masthead Partners, a Cambridge-based venture capital firm focusing on digital media, mobile, and internet infrastructure.

From 2000–2005, Cheung served as Chief Information Officer at Space Adventures in Arlington, VA, the only company to have successfully launched private explorers to space. Cheung ran an unsuccessful campaign as the Republican candidate for the Virginia House of Delegates in 2005. Cheung lost a campaign in the Democratic primary for Lieutenant Governor of Massachusetts in 2014. He had been endorsed by The Boston Globe. On September 8, 2016, Cheung lost the Democratic primary for the Massachusetts State Senate in the Second Middlesex district. Cheung announced he was not running for reelection in a statement released August 1, 2017.

As a City Councillor, he advocated for open data, Net Zero Zoning, composting and recycling programs. Cheung was a vocal critic of Harvard University and MIT laying off some workers and cutting hours of others. As City Councillor, he was an early supporter of the Harvard divestment from fossil fuel movement. Additionally, he showed his support for the Responsible Investment at Harvard when they campaigned to end Harvard's management of Argentina Timber Plantations.

His top priorities included shifting the increased burden of property taxes to contractors and developers, completing the green line extension, and implementing universal pre-K. He also supports lifting the charter school cap and overhauling education reform by increasing the overall budget, as Massachusetts ranks 47th in spending on education as a percentage of the total budget. He also proposed anticipating the policy issues of the future, addressing driverless cars' impact on transportation, the gig economy's impact on income inequality, and Airbnb's impact on the housing market.
