= David E. Harrison =

American politician (1933–2019)

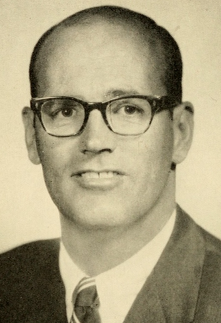

Member of the Massachusetts House of Representatives
- In office 1963–1971
- Preceded by: Richard L. Hull
- Succeeded by: Richard R. Silva

Personal details
- Born: David Elkridge Harrison; June 19, 1933 Boston, Massachusetts, U.S.
- Died: December 1, 2019 (aged 86)
- Party: Democratic
- Spouse: Michelle Holovak (m. 1970)
- Education: Gloucester High School; Tufts College; Portia Law School

David Eldridge Harrison (June 19, 1933 - December 1, 2019) was a former American politician, lobbyist, and judge who served as a member of the Massachusetts House of Representatives and as Chairman of the Massachusetts Democratic Party.

== Political career ==
Harrison was a member of the Massachusetts House of Representatives from 1963 to 1971, representing the 16th Essex District from 1963 to 1965 and the 1st Essex District from 1965 to 1971.

On December 7, 1968, Harrison was unanimously elected Chairman of the Massachusetts Democratic Party. He stepped down as Chairman in May 1971 after an attempt to solve the committee's heavy debt.

Following his departure from the House, Harrison worked as a lobbyist on Beacon Hill. In 1972 he was the highest paid lobbyist at the Massachusetts State House.

During the 1972 United States Presidential Election, Harrison served as George McGovern's New England Campaign Coordinator.

== Judicial career ==
Harrison was sworn in as a district court judge on July 27, 1988. He served in the Lowell District Court and later was the First Justice of the Gloucester District Court.

=== Resignation ===
Harrison resigned from the bench in 2006 after the Office of Bar Counsel filed a petition for discipline against him. The petition alleged that Harrison had interfered with the Commission on Judicial Conduct's inquiry of him and that he had assisted a Commission member and another judge in violating the laws protecting the confidentiality of the Commission's proceedings.

In 1999, the Commission on Judicial Conduct investigated Harrison's conduct during a zoning board hearing in Gloucester, Massachusetts. During the investigation, Harrison discussed the Commission's investigation of him with Commission member Gerald Cook and he received and read a copy of the Commission's confidential memorandum.

On February 13, 2006, the Board of Bar Overseers voted to recommend that Harrison's resignation be accepted as a disciplinary sanction. On March 1, 2006, the Supreme Judicial Court for Suffolk County entered judgment accepting the respondent's affidavit of resignation as a disciplinary sanction. A month later, the Supreme Judicial Court ordered that Harrison's name be "stricken from the Roll of Attorneys".

== Personal life ==
Harrison is a graduate of Gloucester High School, Tufts College, and Portia Law School.

In 1970 he married Michelle Holovak, the daughter of former Boston College and Boston Patriots head coach Mike Holovak.

Outside politics Harrison worked in insurance and real estate sales and also as a high school football and lacrosse referee.

Harrison died on December 1, 2019, in Danvers, Massachusetts.

Party political offices
Preceded by Lester Hyman	Chairman of the Massachusetts Democratic Party; 1968–1971	Succeeded by Robert Q. Crane
