= David Magnani =

American politician

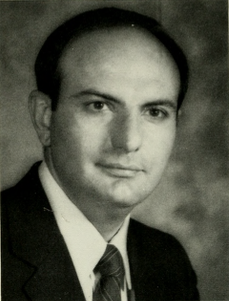

Member of the Massachusetts Senate from the 2nd Middlesex and Norfolk district
- In office 1992–2004
- Succeeded by: Karen Spilka

Member of the Massachusetts House of Representatives from the 7th Middlesex district
- In office 1984–1992
- Preceded by: Andrew Rogers
- Succeeded by: John Stefanini

Personal details
- Born: David Peter Joseph Magnani; May 24, 1944 (age 82) Framingham, Massachusetts, U.S.
- Party: Democratic
- Education: Northeastern University; University of Massachusetts Amherst; Harvard Kennedy School

David P. Magnani (born May 24, 1944) is an American politician and activist. He served as Democratic member of Massachusetts House of Representatives and Senate from 1984 to 2004 representing 7th Middlesex district and 2nd Middlesex and Norfolk district.

== Education ==
In 1968, he received a Bachelor of Mechanical Engineering from Northeastern University, followed by a Master of Education and a Doctor of Education from the University of Massachusetts Amherst. He received a Master of Public Administration from Harvard University's Kennedy School of Government in 1989.

== Career ==
In 1984 elections, he challenged Andrew Rogers, his former high school fellow for state representative seat and won. In 1992, he was elected to the Massachusetts State Senate. After eight years in the House of Representatives and twelve years in the Senate, he retired in 2004 and did not run for re-election.

Magnani served on the Senate education committee and opposed Mitt Romney's proposal to reorganize the University of Massachusetts as part of his plan to cut the state's huge budget deficit in 2003.

In March 2004, he and Representative David Linsky opposed the "Compromise Amendment," supported by House Speaker Thomas Finneran and Senate President Robert Travaglini, it aimed to prohibit gay marriage in Massachusetts, advocating civil unions with similar legal aspects. Magnani frequently voted against amending the state constitution to prohibit same sex marriage in Massachusetts.

In 2007, he was named as executive director of Massachusetts Nonprofit Network, an association of 25000 charities.

== See also ==
- Massachusetts Senate's 2nd Middlesex and Norfolk district
- 1985–1986 Massachusetts legislature
- Karen Spilka
