= Edward P. Kirby =

American politician

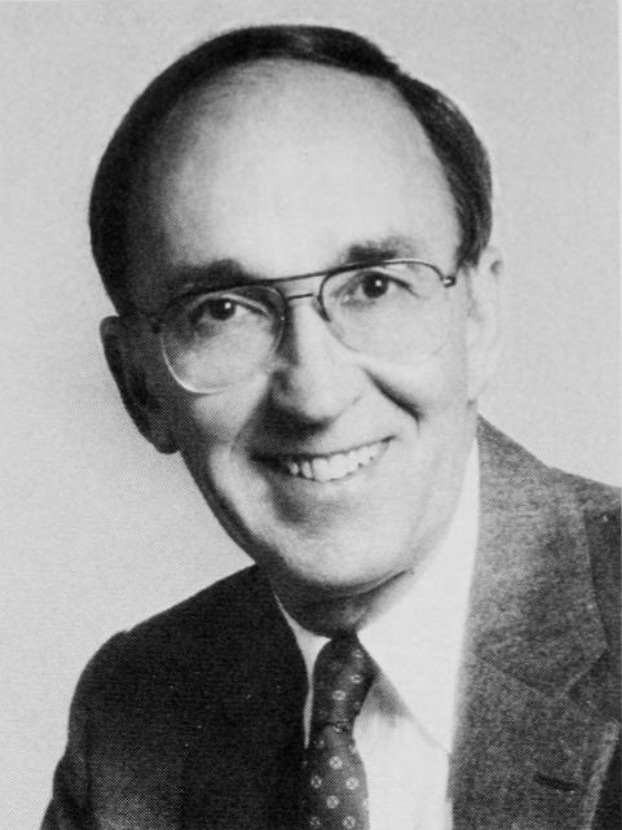

Member of the Massachusetts Senate
- In office January 7, 1981 – January 6, 1993
- Preceded by: Robert E. McCarthy
- Succeeded by: Therese Murray
- Constituency: 2nd Plymouth district (1981–1989); Plymouth and Barnstable district (1989–1993)

Commissioner of the Plymouth County Commission
- In office January 1969 – January 1977
- Preceded by: Norman G. McDonald
- Succeeded by: Joseph W. McCarthy

Member of the Massachusetts House of Representatives
- In office January 4, 1961 – January 4, 1967
- Preceded by: Malcolm B. Boynton
- Succeeded by: Charles W. Mann
- Constituency: 5th Plymouth district (1961–1965); 4th Plymouth district (1965–1967)

Personal details
- Born: Edward Paul Kirby; January 10, 1928 Whitman, Massachusetts, U.S.
- Died: January 3, 2017 (aged 88)
- Party: Republican
- Spouse: Mary Alice Kirby
- Children: 3
- Education: College of the Holy Cross (AB); Boston College (JD)

Military service
- Branch/service: United States Army
- Years of service: 1952–1955
- Rank: First Lieutenant (active); Captain
- Unit: J.A.G. Corps
- Battles/wars: Korean War

Edward Paul "Ned" Kirby (January 10, 1928 – January 3, 2017) was an American politician and lawyer from Massachusetts.

== Education ==
He graduated from the College of the Holy Cross in 1949 and Boston College Law School in 1952.

== Military service ==
He served in the United States Army during the Korean War. He served with the Army Judge Advocate General Corps. He later served as a Captain in the Army Reserves.

== Legal career ==
He practiced law and served as Town Counsel for Whitman, Massachusetts.

== Political career ==
From 1961 to 1967, Kirby was a member of the Massachusetts House of Representatives. From 1969 to 1977 he was a Plymouth County Commissioner. From 1981 to 1993 he served in the Massachusetts Senate. He was the Third Assistant Minority Leader from 1983 to 1989 and again from 1991 to 1993. He served in all positions as a Republican. He ran in the 2004 State Representative General Election for the 7th Plymouth district but lost to Kathleen M. Teahan. He served on the Whitman Republican Town Committee. He founded the Plymouth County Development Council.

=== Political positions & notable legislation ===
He was pro-life. In 1989, he was opposed to a gay rights bill which would have prohibited discrimination against gays and lesbians in housing, employment and credit. Some believe this action may have cost him his seat in the 1992 State Senate election to Therese Murray. He successfully helped pass legislation which went toward economic development for Whitman, the South Shore, the return of commuter rail service on the Plymouth/Kingston Line, and the Big Dig.

== Later career ==
He was appointed as a Administrative Law Judge by Governor Bill Weld, and was an Appeals Judge in Workers Compensation.

== Personal life ==
He and his wife Mary Alice Kirby had three children.

== Death ==
He died on January 3, 2017.
