= Charles E. Shannon Jr. =

American politician

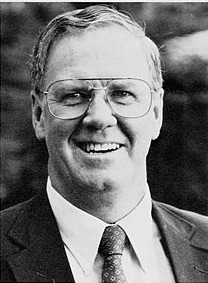
- Charles Shannon, circa 1991

Member of the Massachusetts Senate from the 2nd Middlesex district
- In office January 2, 1991 – April 5, 2005
- Preceded by: Salvatore Albano
- Succeeded by: Patricia D. Jehlen

Personal details
- Born: August 31, 1943 Cambridge, Massachusetts
- Died: April 5, 2005 (aged 61) Boston, Massachusetts
- Party: Democratic

Charles Edward Shannon Jr. (August 31, 1943 – April 5, 2005) was a Massachusetts state senator. He represented the Second Middlesex district from 1991 until his death in 2005, first as a Republican and later as a Democrat. A resident of Winchester, Massachusetts, Shannon served as a Lexington policeman and a Winchester town official prior to serving in the state legislature.

== Biography ==
Born and raised in Cambridge, Massachusetts, Shannon attended St. Mary's Elementary School and St. Mary's High School. He graduated with a B.S. from Northeastern University in Boston. He served as a police officer for 20 years in Lexington, Massachusetts until a heart attack led him to be medically retired from the force. He was cited and received awards for heroism twice. He moved to Winchester in 1982. He eventually was elected and served as chairman of the Winchester Board of Assessors from 1989 until 1990. He was elected as a Republican for the Massachusetts Senate, unseating 6 term Democratic incumbent Salvatore Albano, and was sworn in January 1991. In December 1996 he announced a switch to the Democratic Party, reversing an earlier switch; he had been a Democrat prior to serving in the Senate.

In December 2004, shortly after election to an eighth term, Shannon was diagnosed with leukemia. He had previously been treated for cancer in 1990 and 2002. In February 2005 he received a bone marrow transplant. Antirejection drugs he took after the transplant caused an adverse reaction, which led to his death from heart failure. He died April 5, 2005, at Massachusetts General Hospital in Boston.

== Honors ==
In 2008, Sandy Beach in the Mystic River Reservation was renamed to Charles E. Shannon Jr. Memorial Beach.
