= Dick Kraus =

American politician and educator (1937–2019)

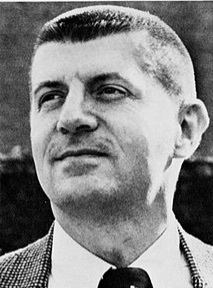

Member of the Massachusetts State Senate for the Fourth Middlesex District
- In office 1983–1991
- Preceded by: Samuel Rotondi
- Succeeded by: Robert A. Havern III

President of Cape Cod Community College
- In office 1991–1998
- Preceded by: Philip R. Day, Jr.
- Succeeded by: Kathleen Schatzberg

Town of Arlington Massachusetts School Committee
- In office 1970–1976

Town of Arlington Massachusetts Town Meeting Member
- In office 1970–1976

Personal details
- Born: Richard Arnold Kraus; August 27, 1937 Hutchinson, Kansas
- Died: December 8, 2019 (aged 82)
- Party: Democratic
- Spouse: Patricia Fiero
- Parent(s): Wanda Myrtle (Casebolt) Kraus; Walter Raymond Kraus
- Education: Hutchinson Junior College, A.A.S, 1957; University of Kansas, A.B., 1959; Harvard University, M.A. 1961; PhD 1968.

Richard Arnold Kraus (August 27, 1937 – December 8, 2019) was a Massachusetts educator and politician who represented the Fourth Middlesex District in the Massachusetts State Senate and who was the president of Cape Cod Community College.

Kraus was born in Hutchinson, Kansas to Wanda Myrtle (Casebolt) Kraus and Walter Raymond Kraus. He went to Hutchinson Community College and graduated from University of Kansas in 1959. In 1968, Kraus received his doctorate degree from Harvard University. Kraus served in several positions at Harvard University including dean of the Graduate School of Arts and Sciences. Kraus lived in Arlington, Massachusetts with his wife and family. He served on the Arlington school committee from 1970 to 1976 and served as chairman of the school committee. His wife was Patricia Fiero who also served in the Massachusetts General Court.

Political offices
Preceded by Samuel Rotondi	Member of the Massachusetts State Senate for The Fourth Middlesex District; 1983–1991	Succeeded by Robert A. Havern III
Academic offices
Preceded by Philip R. Day, Jr.	President of Cape Cod Community College; 1991–1998	Succeeded by Kathleen Schatzberg
