= Richard R. Silva =

American politician

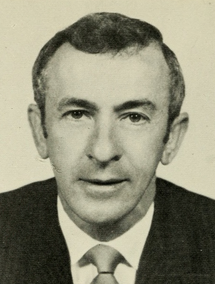

Mayor of Gloucester, Massachusetts
- In office 1984–1988
- Preceded by: Leo I. Alper
- Succeeded by: William B. Squillace

Member of the Massachusetts House of Representatives
- In office 1971–1984
- Preceded by: David E. Harrison
- Succeeded by: Patricia Fiero

Personal details
- Born: March 13, 1922 Gloucester, Massachusetts
- Died: January 27, 2009 (aged 86) Gloucester, Massachusetts
- Resting place: Wesleyan Cemetery
- Party: Republican
- Education: Gloucester High School

Richard R. Silva (March 13, 1922 – January 27, 2009) was an American politician who was a member of the Massachusetts House of Representatives and mayor of Gloucester, Massachusetts.

== Early life ==
Silva was born on March 13, 1922, in Gloucester to James and Ellen (Simmons) Silva. He attended Gloucester public schools and graduated from Gloucester High School in 1939. During World War II he served as a signalman in the United States Coast Guard. After the war Silva was a service technician for the Massachusetts Electric Company.

== Political career ==
From 1963 to 1971, Silva served on the Gloucester School Committee. He served as the committee's vice-chairman for three years.

In 1970, Silva was elected to the Massachusetts House of Representatives by upsetting David E. Harrison, a Gloucester Democrat who had been chosen by Senator Edward M. Kennedy to serve as Chairman of the Massachusetts Democratic Party. During his campaign, Silva emphasized Harrison's absentee record and his opposition to cutting the number of representatives in the Massachusetts House from 240 to 160, a proposal that Gloucester voters overwhelmingly supported. During his tenure, Silva including established and chaired of the New England Committee for the 200-mile limit, filed legislation which established two ocean sanctuaries, filed legislation for the development of Gloucester Harbor, co-sponsored the "Bottle Bill," proposed the Commonwealth obtain a decommissioned US Navy ship and convert it into a minimum security prison, and introduced a bill that would make the Right whale Massachusetts' official marine mammal.

While serving in the House, Silva was a director of the Gloucester Little League, Addison Gilbert Hospital, and Sawyer Free Library.

From 1984 to 1988, Silva was mayor of Gloucester. During his tenure he budgeted funds for the refurbishment of Newell Stadium and reached a deal to the keep the National Marine Fisheries Service office in Gloucester.

== Later life and death ==
After leaving office, Silva served chairman of the Gloucester Fisheries Commission, was a director of the Sawyer Free Library, and was appointed by the Speaker of the House to study hazardous waste facing the shellfish industry.

Silva died on January 27, 2009, in Gloucester.

== See also ==
- Massachusetts House of Representatives' 5th Essex district
