= Robert C. Buell =

American politician (1931–2018)

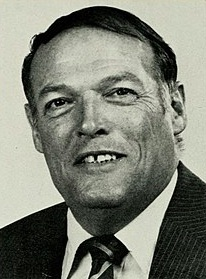
- Robert Buell, circa 1991

Member of the Massachusetts Senate from the 1st Essex and Middlesex district
- In office 1979–1995
- Preceded by: William L. Saltonstall
- Succeeded by: Bruce Tarr

Member of the Massachusetts House of Representatives from the 12th Essex district
- In office 1969–1979
- Preceded by: James Hurrell
- Succeeded by: Theodore C. Speliotis

Personal details
- Born: April 23, 1931 Boston, Massachusetts, U.S.
- Died: September 25, 2018 (aged 87) Rye, New Hampshire, U.S.
- Party: Republican
- Spouse: Jean Wetmore Buell
- Education: Union College; Boston University
- Occupation: Insurance Broker; Politician

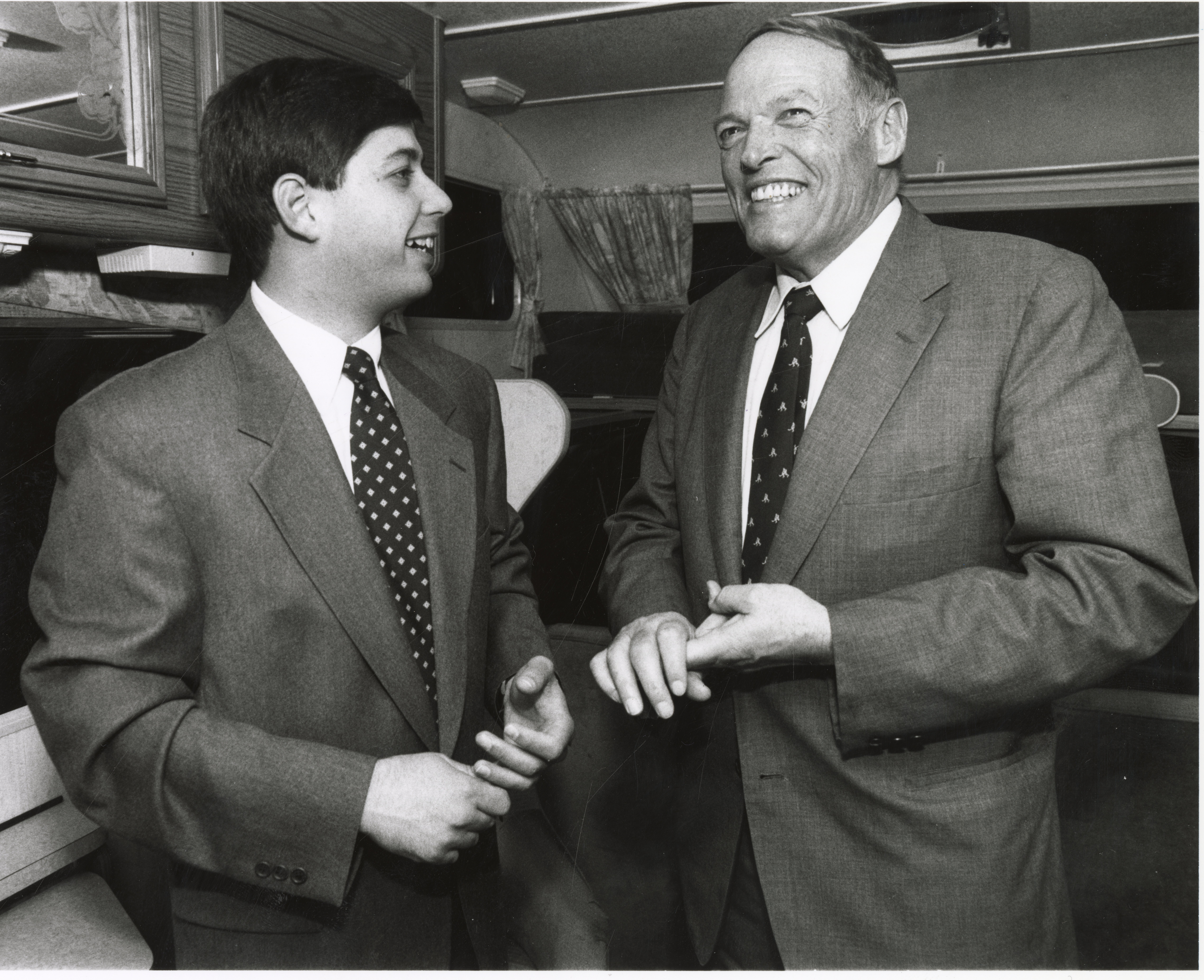
Buell (right) speaking with Bruce Tarr in 1994

Robert Colby Buell (April 23, 1931 – September 25, 2018) was an American insurance broker and politician who served in the Massachusetts House of Representatives from 1969 to 1979 and the Massachusetts Senate from 1979 to 1995.

A Republican, Buell ran for the 12th Essex State Representative seat in 1968 and won. He served in the Massachusetts House of Representatives until he ran for the 1st Essex Middlesex State Senate seat in 1979, which he also won. In the Senate, Buell was the Third Assistant Minority Leader from 1981 to 1983 and Second Assistant Minority Leader from 1983 to 1989 and again from 1991 to 1993.

Buell died in Rye, New Hampshire on September 25, 2018, at the age of 87.
