= Cindy Friedman =

American politician

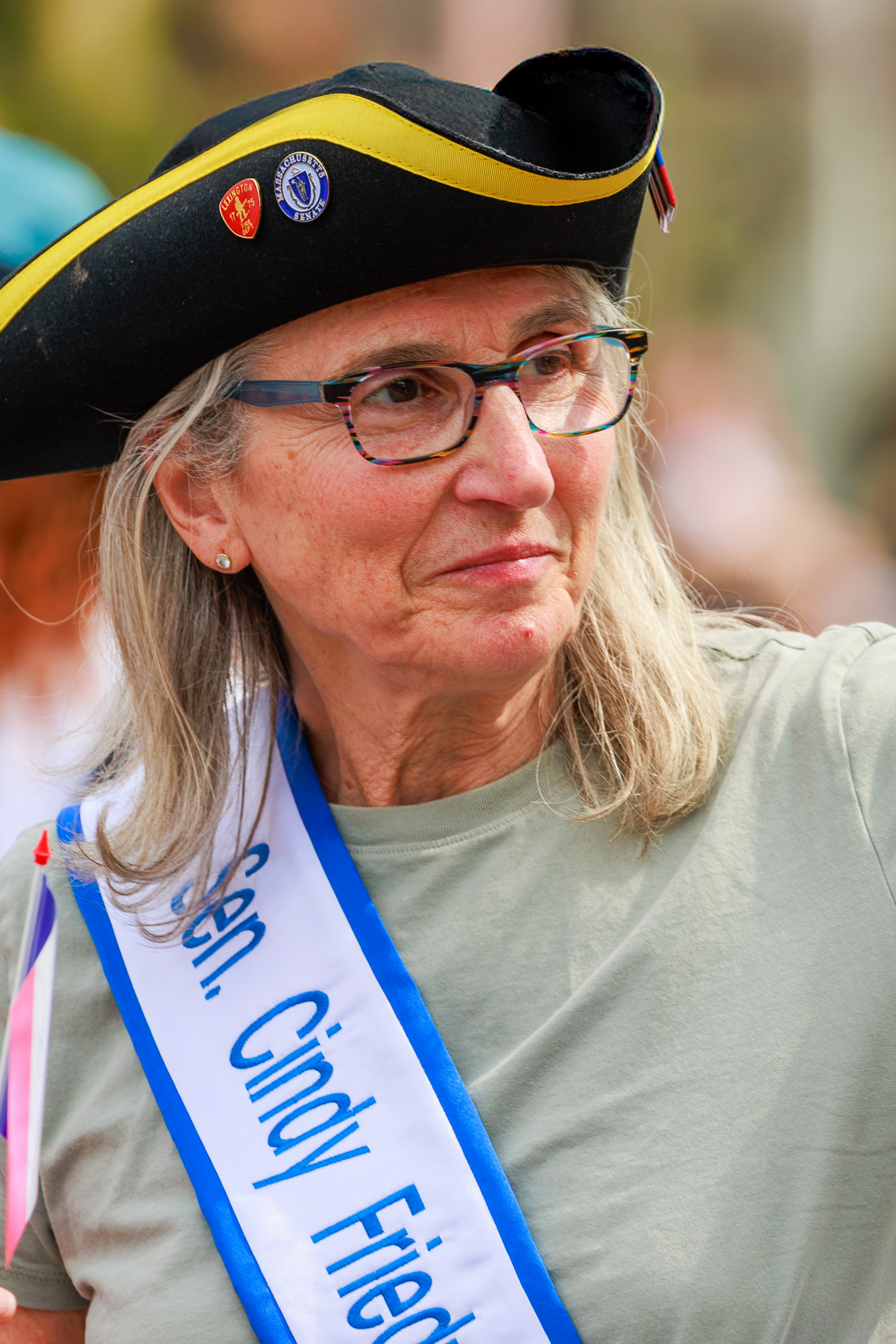
- Friedman in the 2025 Patriots' Day parade

Member of the Massachusetts Senate from the 4th Middlesex district
- Incumbent
- Assumed office July 27, 2017
- Preceded by: Ken Donnelly

Personal details
- Party: Democratic
- Spouse: John Page
- Education: Roger Williams University; Lesley University
- Website: https://cindyfriedman.org/

Cindy F. Friedman is an American politician currently serving as a state senator representing the 4th Middlesex District in the Massachusetts Senate. Friedman's district comprises Arlington, Billerica, Burlington, Lexington (precincts 1 and 2 and 4 to 7), and Woburn. She has been serving since 2017. Prior to becoming a state senator, Friedman worked as a public school teacher and as a senior manager in the high-tech industry and later served for nearly a decade as chief of staff to the late state senator Ken Donnelly. During her first term, Friedman served as the Senate Chair of the Joint Committee on Mental Health, Substance Use and Recovery. For the 191st General Court, Friedman serves as the Senate Chair of the Joint Committee on Health Care Financing and is vice chair of the Senate Committee on Ways and Means.

== Political career ==
Early in her career, Friedman served as a community organizer for groups such as Planned Parenthood, advocating for reproductive rights for women. When her children entered Arlington Public Schools, Friedman was a founding member of the Arlington Education Foundation and Schools are a Priority in our Town (SPOT) to support high-equality and equitable educational opportunities in Arlington. Later, Friedman was elected as an Arlington Town Meeting member, and helped manage the gubernatorial campaigns of Don Berwick and Deval Patrick, as well as the state Senate campaigns of Ken Donnelly.

== Committees and caucuses ==
Friedman serves as the Senate Chair of the Joint Committee on Health Care Financing and is vice chair of the Senate Committee on Ways and Means. Additionally, she is a member of the Joint Committee on Transportation, the Joint Committee on Mental Health, Substance Use and Recovery, the Senate Committee on Ethics and the Senate Committee on Rules

Additionally, Friedman is the co-chair of the Massachusetts Caucus of Women Legislators, the MBTA Legislative Caucus and the Library Legislative Caucus.

== Policy ==
Friedman is a Democrat, and a member of the General Court's Progressive Caucus. During her first term in office, Friedman helped successfully champion several major pieces of legislation, including bills to raise the minimum wage to $15 per hour and implement paid family medical leave, reform the criminal justice system, increase funding for workforce training and development and combat the opioid crisis in Massachusetts. Education, housing, transportation and civil rights are also important legislative priorities for Friedman.

== Electoral history ==
2018 State Senate general election – 4th Middlesex District: Party / Candidate / Vote % / Vote; Democrat / Cindy F. Friedman / 98.9% / 59,993; Write-in / / 1.1% / 686; 2017 Special State Senate general election – 4th Middlesex
Party
Candidate
Vote %
Vote
Democrat
Cindy F. Friedman (won)
88.7%
7,876
Green-

Rainbow

Ian T. Jackson
9.4%
832

2017 Special State Senate primary election – 4th Middlesex
Party	Candidate	Vote %	Vote
Democrat	Cindy F. Friedman (won)	51.3%	7,079
Democrat	Sean Garballey	45.6%	6,300
Democrat	Mary Anne Stewart	3%	

== Personal life ==
Friedman holds a bachelor's degree from Roger Williams University and a master's degree in special education from Lesley University. She currently lives in Arlington Center with her husband of 35 years, John Page, and has three adult children. She is Jewish.

== See also ==
- 2019–2020 Massachusetts legislature
- 2021–2022 Massachusetts legislature
