= Massachusetts House of Representatives' 5th Essex district =

American legislative district

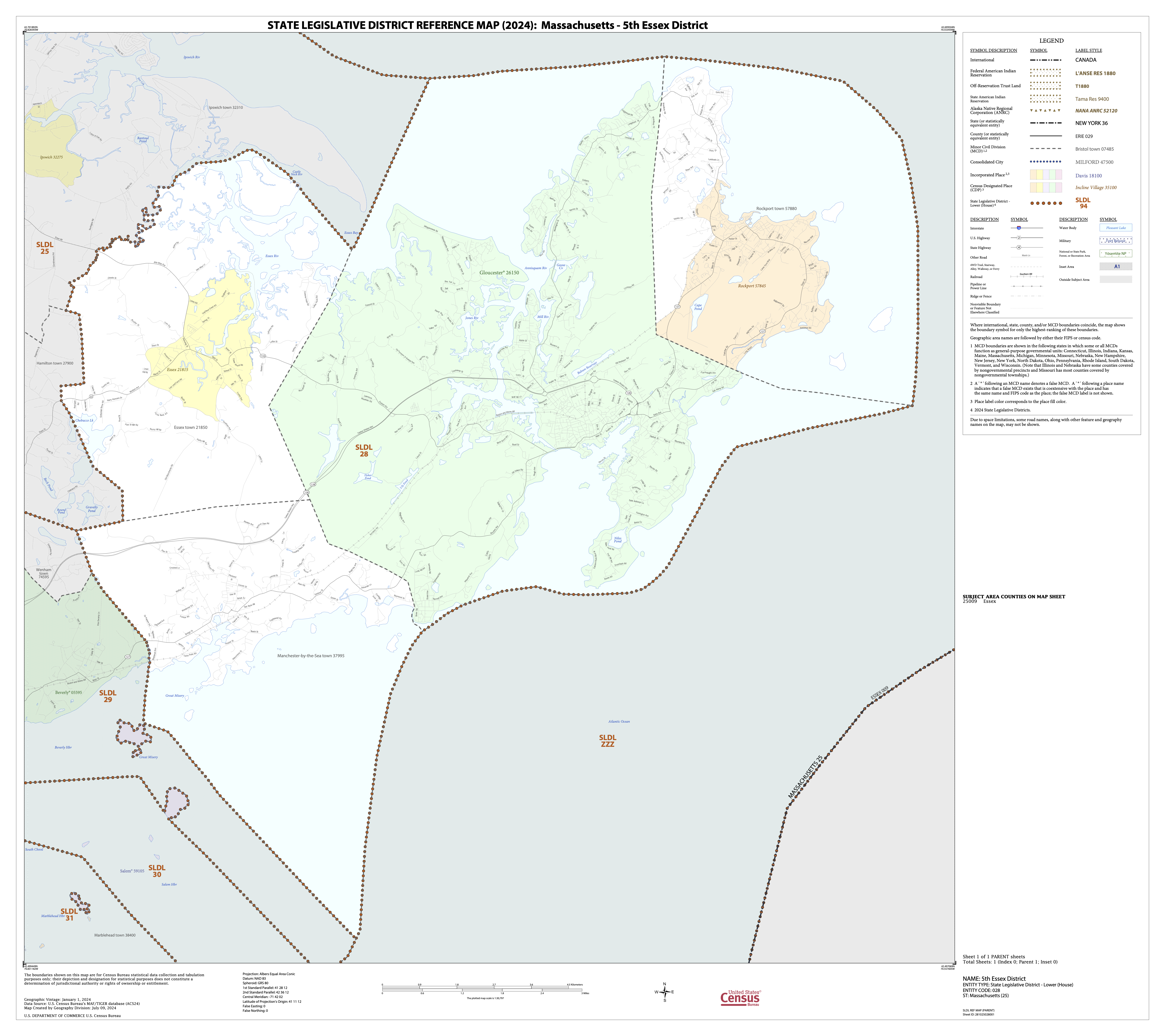
Map of Massachusetts House of Representatives' 5th Essex district, based on the 2020 United States census.

Massachusetts House of Representatives' 5th Essex district is one of 160 districts included in the lower house of the Massachusetts General Court. It covers the towns of Essex, Rockport, and Manchester-by-the-Sea and the city of Gloucester in Essex County. Democrat Ann-Margaret Ferrante of Gloucester represented the district from 2009 until her death in 2025. Andrew Tarr was elected to replace her in a 2026 special election.

== Locales represented ==
The district includes the following localities:

- Essex
- Gloucester
- Rockport
- Manchester-by-the-Sea

The current district geographic boundary overlaps with that of the Massachusetts Senate's 1st Essex and Middlesex district.

=== Former locales ===
The district previously covered:

- Boxford, circa 1872
- Georgetown, circa 1872
- Groveland, circa 1872

== Representatives ==
- Charles Howes, circa 1858
- Luther Allen, circa 1859
- Harry Millett Eames, circa 1888
- William John Hinchcliffe, circa 1888
- Robert W. Dow, circa 1920
- William L. Stedman, circa 1920
- J. Everett Collins, circa 1951
- Frank S. Giles, Jr., circa 1951
- William Longworth, circa 1951
- Peter C. McCarthy, circa 1975
- Patricia G. Fiero, 1984-1991
- Richard R. Silva
- Patricia Fiero
- Bruce Tarr
- Anthony Verga
- Ann-Margaret Ferrante, 2009-2025
- Andrew Tarr, 2026-present

== See also ==
- List of Massachusetts House of Representatives elections
- Other Essex County districts of the Massachusetts House of Representatives: 1st, 2nd, 3rd, 4th, 6th, 7th, 8th, 9th, 10th, 11th, 12th, 13th, 14th, 15th, 16th, 17th, 18th
- Essex County districts of the Massachusett Senate: 1st, 2nd, 3rd; 1st Essex and Middlesex; 2nd Essex and Middlesex
- List of Massachusetts General Courts
- List of former districts of the Massachusetts House of Representatives

== Images ==
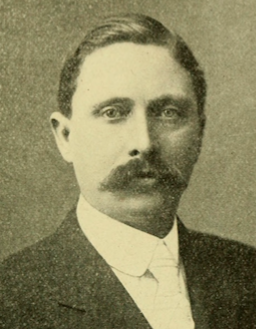
George Bunting

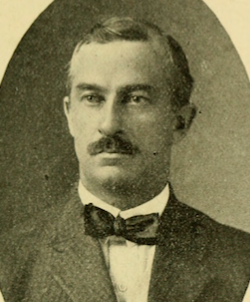
George McLane

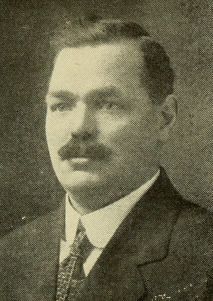
Arthur Bower

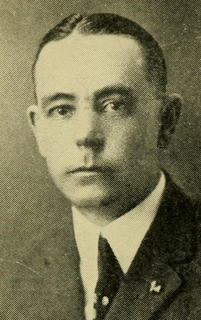
Eugene Griffin

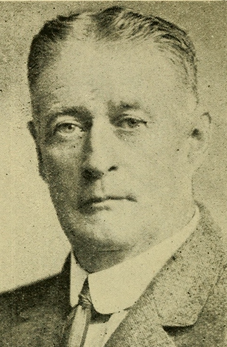
Robert Dow

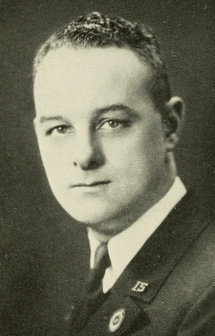
Edward Sirois

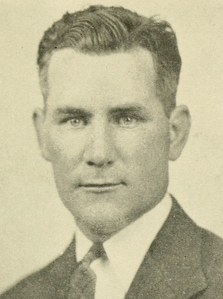
Joseph Conley

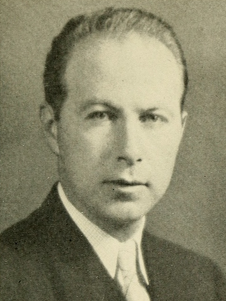
William Casey

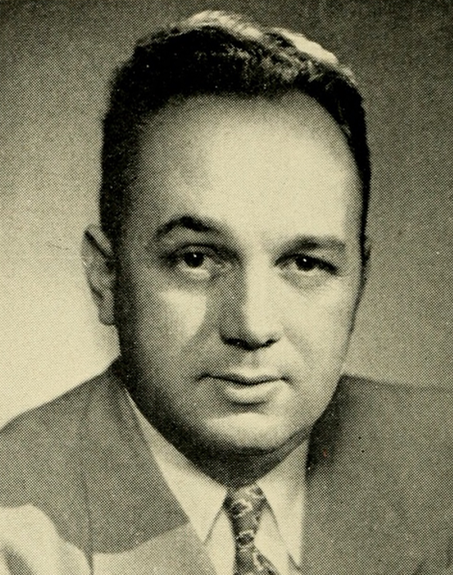
Frank Giles

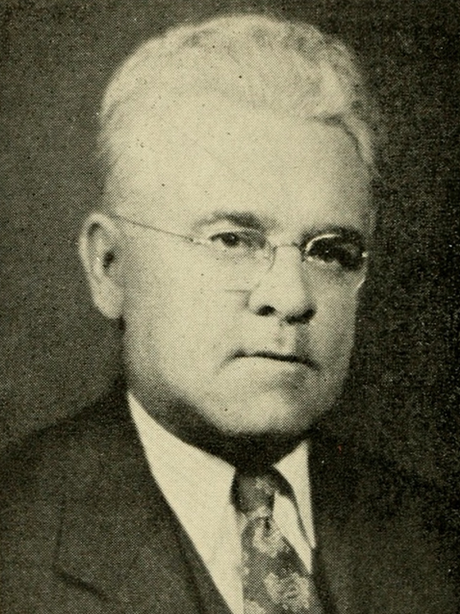
J. Everett Collins

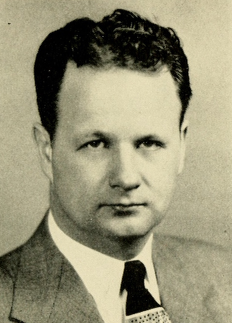
William Longworth

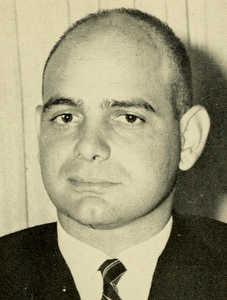
Jerome Segal

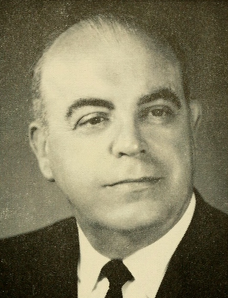
Philip O'Donnell

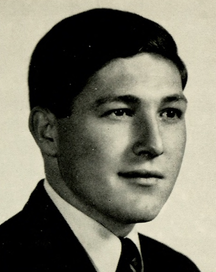
Peter McCarthy

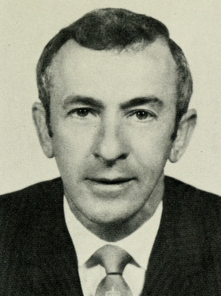
Richard Silva

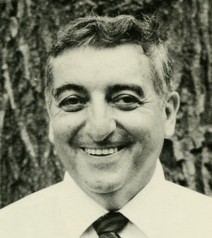
Anthony Verga

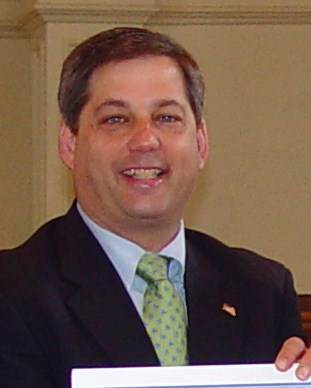
Bruce Tarr
