= Ken Donnelly =

American politician (1950–2017)

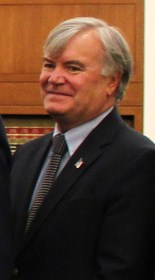

Member of the Massachusetts Senate from the Fourth Middlesex district
- In office 2009–2017
- Succeeded by: Cindy Friedman

Personal details
- Born: July 15, 1950 Arlington, Massachusetts
- Died: April 2, 2017 (aged 66) Arlington, Massachusetts
- Education: University of Massachusetts Amherst

Kenneth J. Donnelly (July 15, 1950 – April 2, 2017) was a Massachusetts state senator for the Fourth Middlesex district, which included his hometown of Arlington and several other cities. He was a Democrat who served from 2009 to 2017.

Donnelly graduated from the University of Massachusetts Amherst with a BA degree in Labor Studies.

He was a retired lieutenant with the Lexington Fire Department in Lexington, Massachusetts.

On June 17, 2014, Donnelly endorsed fellow Democrat Don Berwick in the 2014 Massachusetts gubernatorial election.

Donnelly died on April 2, 2017, in Arlington, Massachusetts, from complications of a brain tumor, aged 66.
