= Robert E. McCarthy =

American politician (1940–2022)

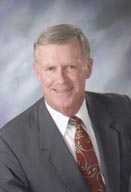

Register of Probate of Plymouth County
- In office 2001–2015
- Preceded by: John J. Daley
- Succeeded by: Matthew J. McDonough

Member of the Massachusetts Senate
- In office January 1, 1975 – January 7, 1981
- Preceded by: John M. Quinlan
- Succeeded by: Edward P. Kirby
- Constituency: Bristol, Plymouth and Norfolk district (1975–1979); 2nd Plymouth district (1979–1981)

Member of the Massachusetts House of Representatives from the 8th Plymouth district
- In office January 6, 1971 – January 1, 1975
- Preceded by: Karl S. Nordin
- Succeeded by: Peter Y. Flynn

Member of the East Bridgewater Board of Selectmen
- In office 1969–1975

Personal details
- Born: Robert Emmett McCarthy; January 12, 1940 Brockton, Massachusetts, U.S.
- Died: January 15, 2022 (aged 82)
- Party: Democratic
- Education: United States Military Academy (BS); Boston College (LLB)

Military service
- Branch/service: United States Army
- Years of service: 1961–1964
- Rank: First Lieutenant
- Unit: 503rd & 325th Airborne Infantry Regiments, 82nd Airborne Division

Robert Emmett McCarthy (January 12, 1940 – January 15, 2022) was an American lawyer and politician from Massachusetts.

== Education ==
McCarthy attended the United States Military Academy from 1957 to 1961 and graduated with a Bachelor of Science degree. He graduated from Boston College Law School with a Bachelor of Laws degree in 1967.

== Military service ==
Upon graduation from West Point, McCarthy was commissioned a Second Lieutenant in the Infantry branch of the United States Army. From 1962 to 1963, he served with the 503rd and 325th Airborne Infantry Regiments of the 82nd Airborne Division. He resigned his commission in 1964 as a First Lieutenant.

== Legal career ==
McCarthy practiced law in East Bridgewater, Massachusetts, after graduating from law school.

== Political career ==
From 1969 to 1975, McCarthy served on the East Bridgewater Board of Selectmen. From 1971 to 1975, he served in the Massachusetts House of Representatives representing the 8th Plymouth district as a Democrat. From 1975 to 1981, he served in the Massachusetts Senate representing the Bristol, Plymouth and Norfolk districts (1975–1879) and the 2nd Plymouth district (1979–1881). He was also an unsuccessful candidate for the United States House of Representatives seat in Massachusetts's 10th congressional district in 1980.

From 2001 to 2015, he served as Register of Probate for Plymouth County, Massachusetts.
