= Patricia Fiero =

American politician

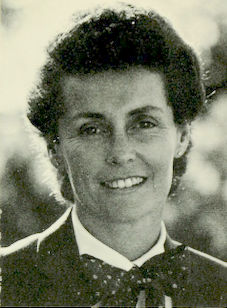
- Fiero, circa 1987

Member of the Massachusetts House of Representatives from the 5th Essex district
- In office 1984–1991
- Preceded by: Richard R. Silva
- Succeeded by: Bruce Tarr

Personal details
- Born: June 12, 1941 (age 85) Brooklyn, New York City, New York, United States
- Party: Democratic
- Spouse: Dick Kraus
- Education: Bucknell University; SUNY Buffalo

Patricia G. Fiero is an American politician who represented the 5th Essex District in the Massachusetts House of Representatives from 1984 to 1991.

== Early life ==
Fiero was born on June 12, 1941, in Brooklyn. She graduated from Bucknell University and SUNY Buffalo.

== Political career ==
Fiero was elected in a 1984 special election after Representative Richard R. Silva was elected mayor of Gloucester. She ran as an opponent of Speaker Thomas W. McGee and was one of the earliest supporters of George Keverian when he challenged McGee for Speaker. She remained in the House until she was defeated for reelection by Bruce Tarr in 1990. During her tenure, Fiero was known as one of the House's more liberal members.

== Personal life ==
Fiero was married to Dick Kraus who also served in the Massachusetts General Court.

== See also ==
- 1985–1986 Massachusetts legislature
- 1987–1988 Massachusetts legislature
- 1989–1990 Massachusetts legislature
