= Anthony Verga =

American politician (1935–2023)

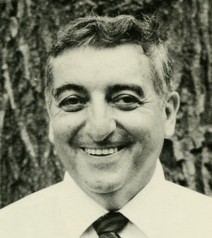
- Verga, circa 1995

Member of the Massachusetts House of Representatives from the 5th Essex district
- In office 1995–2009
- Preceded by: Bruce Tarr
- Succeeded by: Ann-Margaret Ferrante

Personal details
- Born: April 26, 1935 Gloucester, Massachusetts, U.S.
- Died: March 10, 2023 (aged 87) Beverly, Massachusetts, U.S.
- Resting place: Calvary Cemetery; Gloucester, Massachusetts
- Party: Democratic
- Occupation: Politician; Director of Fisheries

Anthony J. Verga (April 26, 1935 – March 10, 2023) was an American politician who represented the 5th Essex district in the Massachusetts House of Representatives from 1995 to 2009. He was defeated by attorney Ann-Margaret Ferrante in the 2008 Democratic primary.

Verga was a champion of veterans' causes during his tenure and in 2006 was endorsed by the Massachusetts Veterans Services Officers Association for the position of state Secretary of Veterans' affairs. In 2008 he was awarded the National Guard Association of the United States's Charles Dick Medal of Merit.

In 2012, Verga broke with his party and endorsed Republican Scott Brown over Democrat Elizabeth Warren in that year's United States Senate election.

Verga died in Beverly, Massachusetts, on March 10, 2023, at the age of 87.
