= Massachusetts Senate's 1st Essex and Middlesex district =

American legislative district

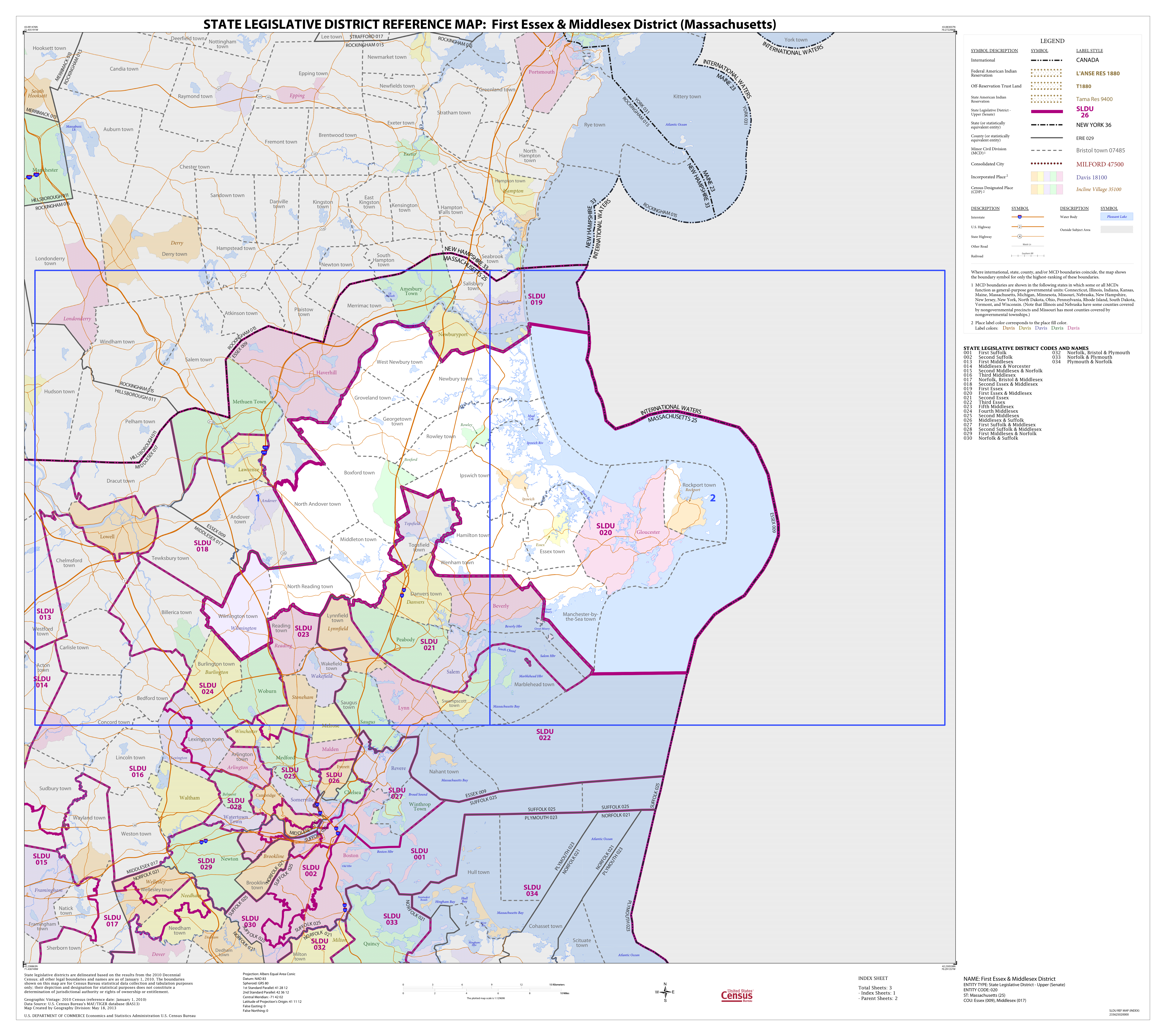
Map of Massachusetts Senate's 1st Essex and Middlesex district, based on the 2010 United States census.

Massachusetts Senate's 1st Essex and Middlesex district in the United States is one of 40 legislative districts of the Massachusetts Senate. It covers 17.8% of Essex County and 2.5% of Middlesex County population. Republican Bruce Tarr of Gloucester has represented the district since 1995.

== Towns represented ==
The district includes the following 19 localities:

- Boxford
- Essex
- Georgetown
- Gloucester
- Groveland
- Hamilton
- Ipswich
- Manchester-by-the-Sea
- Middleton
- Newbury
- North Andover
- North Reading
- Rockport
- Rowley
- Topsfield
- Wenham
- West Newbury

== List of senators ==
Senator	Party	Years	Legis.	Electoral history	District towns
District created in 1975.
William L. Saltonstall	Republican	1975 – 1979	169th 170th	Redistricted from 3rd Essex district. Re-elected in 1974. Re-elected in 1976. Retired.	
Robert C. Buell	Republican	1979 – 1995	171st 172nd 173rd 174th 175th 176th 177th 178th	Elected in 1978. Re-elected in 1980. Re-elected in 1982. Re-elected in 1984. Re-elected in 1986. Re-elected in 1988. Re-elected in 1990. Re-elected in 1992. Retired.	
Bruce Tarr	Republican	January 1995–	179th 180th 181st 182nd 183rd 184th 185th 186th 187th 188th 189th 190th 191st 192nd 193rd 194th	Elected in 1994. Re-elected in 1996. Re-elected in 1998. Re-elected in 2000. Re-elected in 2002. Re-elected in 2004. Re-elected in 2006. Re-elected in 2008. Re-elected in 2010. Re-elected in 2012. Re-elected in 2014. Re-elected in 2016. Re-elected in 2018. Re-elected in 2020. Re-elected in 2022. Re-elected in 2024.	

== See also ==
- List of Massachusetts Senate elections
- List of Massachusetts General Courts
- List of former districts of the Massachusetts Senate
- Other Essex County districts of the Massachusett Senate: 1st, 2nd, 3rd; 2nd Essex and Middlesex
- Other Middlesex County districts of the Massachusett Senate: 1st, 2nd, 3rd, 4th, 5th; 2nd Essex and Middlesex; 1st Middlesex and Norfolk, 2nd Middlesex and Norfolk; Middlesex and Suffolk; Middlesex and Worcester; Norfolk, Bristol and Middlesex; 1st Suffolk and Middlesex; 2nd Suffolk and Middlesex
- Essex County districts of the Massachusetts House of Representatives: 1st, 2nd, 3rd, 4th, 5th, 6th, 7th, 8th, 9th, 10th, 11th, 12th, 13th, 14th, 15th, 16th, 17th, 18th
- Middlesex County districts of the Massachusetts House of Representatives: 1st, 2nd, 3rd, 4th, 5th, 6th, 7th, 8th, 9th, 10th, 11th, 12th, 13th, 14th, 15th, 16th, 17th, 18th, 19th, 20th, 21st, 22nd, 23rd, 24th, 25th, 26th, 27th, 28th, 29th, 30th, 31st, 32nd, 33rd, 34th, 35th, 36th, 37th
