= Philip R. Day =

Philip R. Day, Jr. (born 7 August 1945) is the former Chancellor of City College of San Francisco. He is also the former president of Daytona Beach Community College, Cape Cod Community College in Massachusetts, and Dundalk Community College in Baltimore, Maryland.

== Biography ==
Day obtained his M. Ed in Counselor Education from SUNY-Buffalo, his B.S. in Psychology at the University of Maine and his Ed.D in Adult and Higher Education at the University of Massachusetts Amherst.

Day is a former member of the board of directors of the American Association of Community Colleges and of the American Council on Education. He also is a member of the National Advisory Council on Vocational Education, which advises Congress on all matters related to vocational/career education.

In December 2007, the Board of Directors of the National Association of Student Financial Aid Administrators (NASFAA) elected Dr. Philip R. Day as the Association's new president and CEO. Day succeeded Dallas Martin who retired after 32 years as NASFAA's CEO and President.

On July 9, 2009, NASFAA announced that he was taking unpaid leave because he had been indicted for misdirecting public money while at the City College of San Francisco. He resigned on July 23.

== Legal issues ==
On July 8, 2009, he was indicted on eight felony counts for misappropriating college funds ($150,000) and using it for political campaigns. Two current associate vice chancellors were also indicted.

In September 2011, based upon a pretrial hearing Settlement Agreement between the District Attorney and Dr. Day's attorneys, five of the felony counts were dismissed and Dr. Day pleaded guilty to three felony counts of misusing public funds (a violation of the CA. Education Code) which, per the pretrial agreement, were reduced to misdemeanors. Dr. Day paid a fine of $30,000 and was placed on probation. No restitution was required to be paid to the College.

Academic offices
Preceded by James F. Hall	President of Cape Cod Community College; 1987 – 1991	Succeeded by Richard A. Kraus
