= Bruce Tarr =

American politician

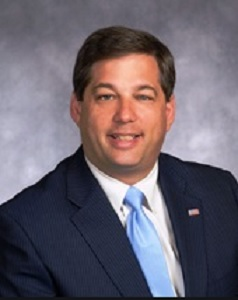

Minority Leader of the Massachusetts Senate
- Incumbent
- Assumed office January 3, 2011
- Preceded by: Richard Tisei

Member of the Massachusetts Senate from the 1st Essex and Middlesex district
- Incumbent
- Assumed office January 3, 1995
- Preceded by: Robert Buell

Member of the Massachusetts House of Representatives from the 5th Essex district
- In office January 3, 1991 – January 3, 1995
- Preceded by: Patricia Fiero
- Succeeded by: Anthony Verga

Personal details
- Born: January 2, 1964 (age 62) Gloucester, Massachusetts, U.S.
- Party: Republican
- Education: Suffolk University (BA, JD)
- Website: Campaign website

Bruce E. Tarr (born January 2, 1964) is an American politician and member of the Republican party who serves as the Minority Leader of the Massachusetts Senate. Since 1995 he has represented the 1st Essex and Middlesex District. He is a member of the United States Republican Party and a former member of the Massachusetts House of Representatives.

The 1st Essex and Middlesex district includes 19 communities: the cities of Gloucester and Newburyport and the towns of Boxford, Essex, Georgetown, Groveland, Hamilton, Ipswich, Manchester-by-the-Sea, Middleton, Newbury, Precincts 5A, 7, and 8 in North Andover, North Reading, Rockport, Rowley, Salisbury, Topsfield, Wenham, and West Newbury.

== Early life ==
Tarr was born in Gloucester, Massachusetts. He is a graduate of Suffolk University, for his undergraduate and J.D. studies.

== Massachusetts House of Representatives ==
Tarr served as a member of the Massachusetts House of Representatives from 1991 to 1995.

== Massachusetts Senate ==
Tarr was elected to the Massachusetts Senate in 1994, and assumed office on January 3, 1995. He has served as the Minority Leader since 2011.

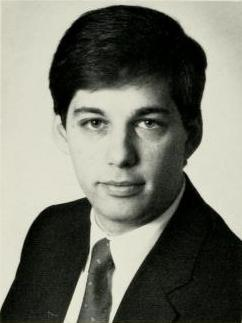
Tarr as a State Representative in 1991

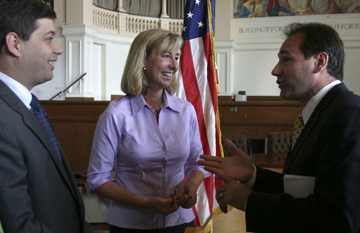
Tarr with Kerry Healey and John Cogliano in 2004

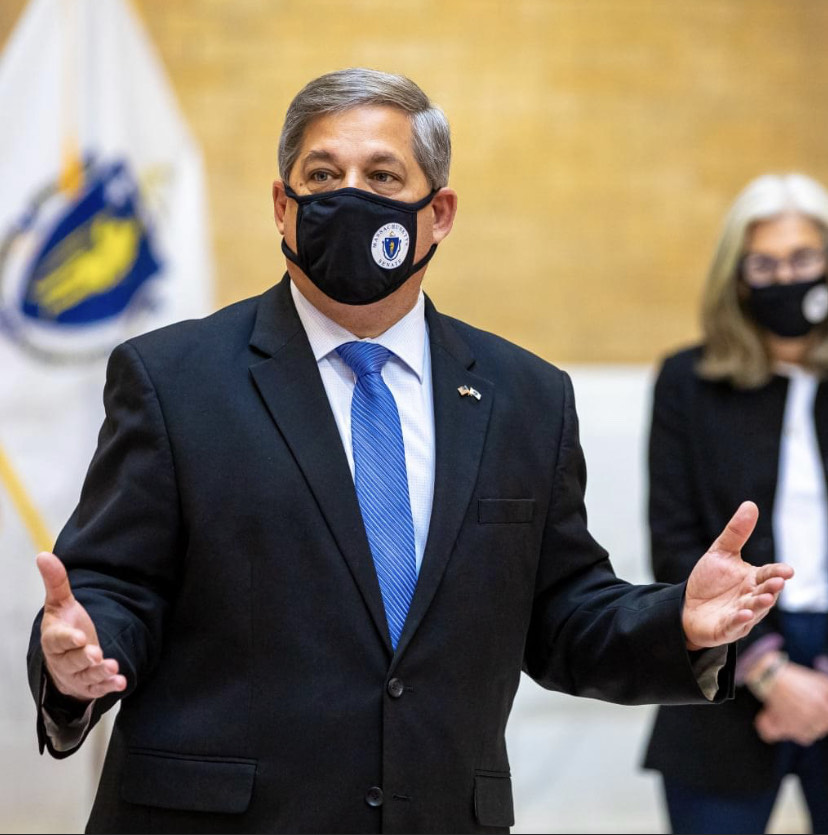
Tarr at a bill signing in 2021

== Electoral history ==
Tarr was reelected without opposition in 1998, 2000, 2006, 2008, 2010, 2012, 2014, 2016, 2018, and 2020.

2022 General State Senate Election for Massachusetts' 1st Essex and Middlesex District
Party	Candidate	Votes	%
Republican	Bruce Tarr	58,838	71.40
Independent	Terence William Cudney	23,408	28.40
Write-In	Others	171	0.20

2004 General State Senate Election for Massachusetts' 1st Essex and Middlesex District
Party	Candidate	Votes	%
Republican	Bruce Tarr	56,020	64.77
Democratic	Paul McGeary	30,179	34.89
Write-In	Others	291	0.34

2002 General State Senate Election for Massachusetts' 1st Essex and Middlesex District
Party	Candidate	Votes	%
Republican	Bruce Tarr	47,745	71.83
Democratic	Andrew Armata	18,699	28.13
Write-In	Others	27	0.04

1996 General State Senate Election for Massachusetts' 1st Essex and Middlesex District
Party	Candidate	Votes	%
Republican	Bruce Tarr	51,851	71.16
Democratic	Klaus Kublerschky	20,986	28.80
Write-In	Others	32	0.04

1994 General State Senate Election for Massachusetts' 1st Essex and Middlessex District
Party	Candidate	Votes	%
Republican	Bruce Tarr	41,313	66.81
Democratic	Klaus Kuhierschky	20,486	33.13
Write-In	Others	34	0.05

1992 General State House of Representatives Election for Massachusetts' 5th Essex District
Party	Candidate	Votes	%
Republican	Bruce Tarr	14,101	67.67
Democratic	Suzanne Mitchell	6,736	32.33

1990 General State House of Representatives Election for Massachusetts' 5th Essex District
Party	Candidate	Votes	%
Republican	Bruce Tarr	8,497	46.68
Democratic	Patricia Fiero	6,781	37.26
Independent	Michael McLeod	2,434	13.37
Independent	Stephen James	489	2.69

1990 Republican Primary State House of Representatives Election for Massachusetts' 5th Essex District
Party	Candidate	Votes	%
Republican	Bruce Tarr	3,007	61.85
Republican	Paul Codhina	1,404	28.88
Republican	David Pye	449	9.23
Write-In	Others	2	0.04

== See also ==
- 2019–2020 Massachusetts legislature
- 2021–2022 Massachusetts legislature

Massachusetts Senate
Preceded by Richard Tisei	Minority Leader of the Massachusetts Senate; 2011–present	Incumbent
