= Massachusetts Senate's 2nd Middlesex district =

American legislative district

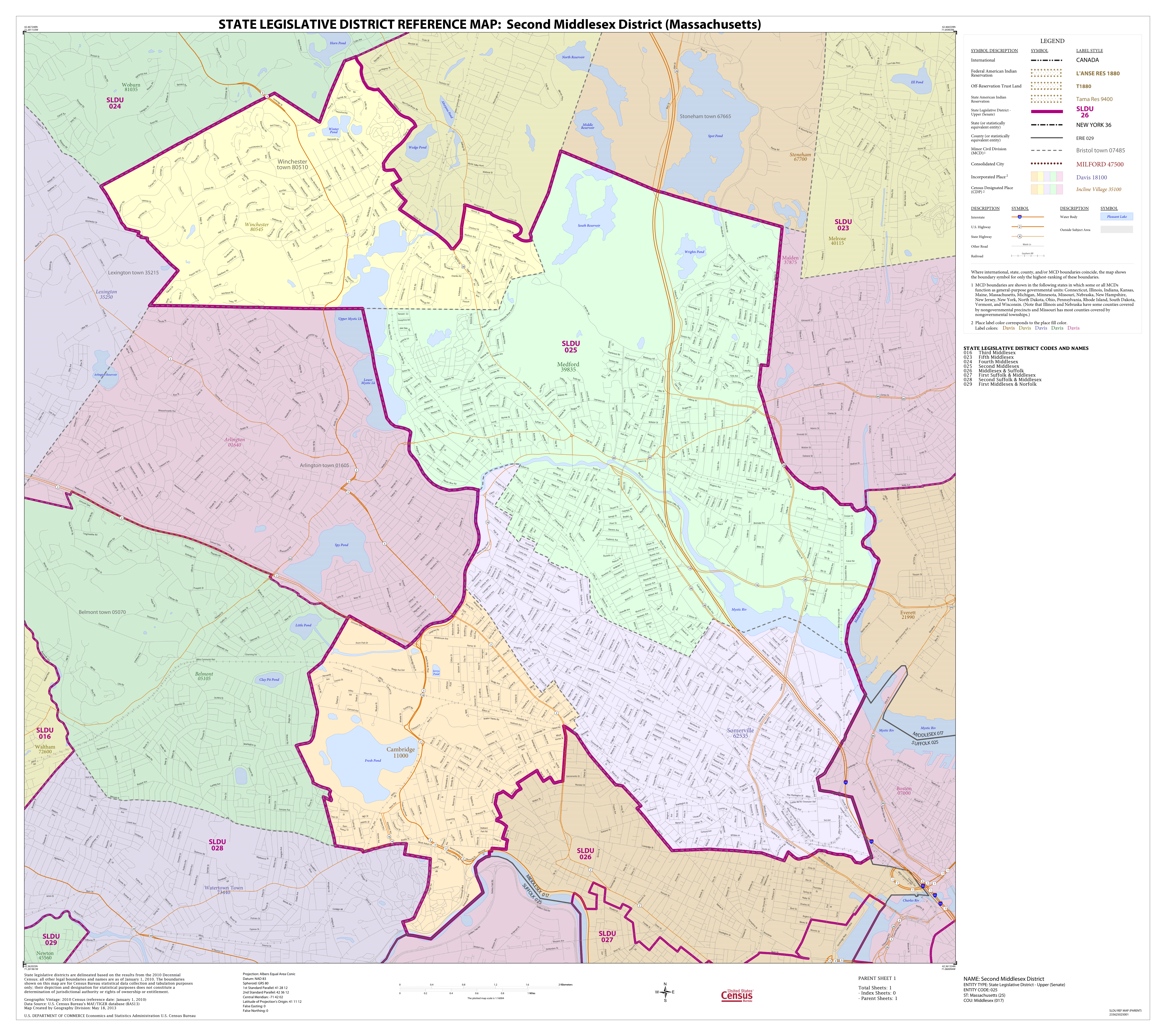
Map of Massachusetts Senate's 2nd Middlesex district, based on the 2010 United States census

Massachusetts Senate's 2nd Middlesex district in the United States is one of 40 legislative districts of the Massachusetts Senate. It covers portions of Middlesex County.

Democrat Pat Jehlen of Somerville had represented the district since 2015. She ran for re-election in 2020, and was endorsed by the Massachusetts Women's Political Caucus.

== Locales represented ==
The district includes the following localities:

- northwest Cambridge
- Medford
- Somerville
- Winchester

The current district geographic boundary overlaps with those of the Massachusetts House of Representatives' 23rd Middlesex, 24th Middlesex, 25th Middlesex, 26th Middlesex, 27th Middlesex, 29th Middlesex, 31st Middlesex, 34th Middlesex, and 35th Middlesex districts.

=== Former locales ===
The district previously covered the following:

- Belmont, circa 1860s
- Malden, circa 1860s
- Waltham, circa 1860s
- Watertown, circa 1860s
- West Cambridge (Arlington), circa 1860s

== Senators ==
- J.M.S. Williams, circa 1859
- Thorndike Spalding
- William Eustis Russell
- George Carrick
- Charles Thomas Cavanagh, circa 1935
- Edward M. Rowe, circa 1945
- Daniel Francis O'Brien, circa 1953
- Francis X. McCann, circa 1957-1969
- Denis L. McKenna, circa 1979
- Salvatore R. "Sal" Albano, 1985-1991
- Charles Edward Shannon, Jr., circa 1993-2002
- Patricia D. Jehlen, 2005-current

== Images ==
Portraits of legislators

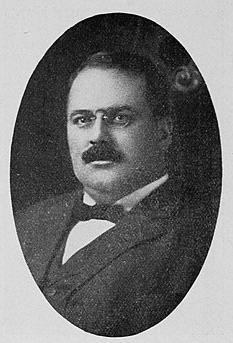
Thorndike Spalding

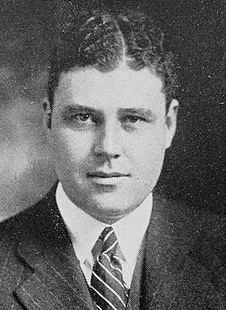
William Eustis Russell

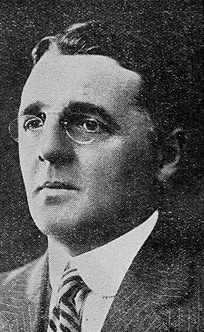
George Carrick

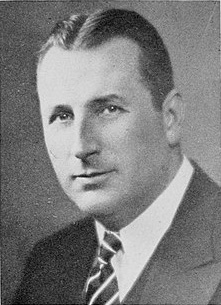
Edward Rowe

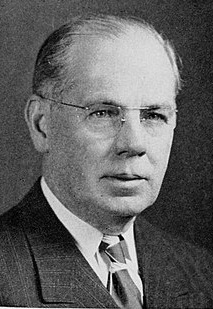
Daniel Francis O'Brien

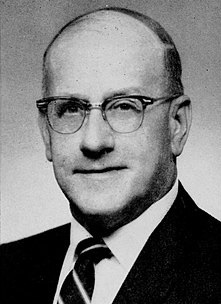
Francis McCann

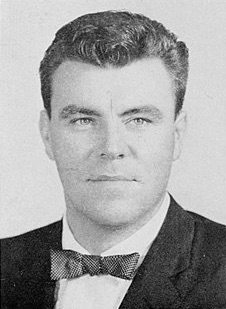
Denis McKenna

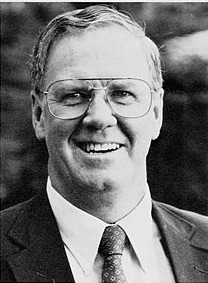
Charles Edward Shannon

== See also ==
- List of Massachusetts Senate elections
- List of Massachusetts General Courts
- List of former districts of the Massachusetts Senate
- Other Middlesex County districts of the Massachusett Senate: 1st, 3rd, 4th, 5th; 1st Essex and Middlesex; 2nd Essex and Middlesex; 1st Middlesex and Norfolk, 2nd Middlesex and Norfolk; Middlesex and Suffolk; Middlesex and Worcester; Norfolk, Bristol and Middlesex; 1st Suffolk and Middlesex; 2nd Suffolk and Middlesex
- Middlesex County districts of the Massachusetts House of Representatives: 1st, 2nd, 3rd, 4th, 5th, 6th, 7th, 8th, 9th, 10th, 11th, 12th, 13th, 14th, 15th, 16th, 17th, 18th, 19th, 20th, 21st, 22nd, 23rd, 24th, 25th, 26th, 27th, 28th, 29th, 30th, 31st, 32nd, 33rd, 34th, 35th, 36th, 37th
