= Massachusetts Senate =

Upper house of the Massachusetts General Court

- 193rd General Court of Massachusetts

Type
- Type: Upper house of the Massachusetts General Court
- Term limits: None

History
- New session started: January 4, 2025

Leadership
- President: Karen Spilka (D) since July 26, 2018
- President pro tempore: William Brownsberger (D) since March 20, 2019
- Majority Leader: Cynthia Stone Creem (D) since February 28, 2018
- Minority Leader: Bruce Tarr (R) since January 5, 2011

Structure
- Seats: 40
- Political groups: Majority (35): Democratic (35); Minority (5): Republican (5)
- Length of term: 2 years
- Authority: Chapter 1, Massachusetts Constitution
- Salary: $70,537/year; set to increase every two years equal to the increase in the median salary of Massachusetts. Additional stipends are given to leaders of the majority and minority party.

Elections
- Voting system: First-past-the-post
- Last election: November 3, 2026
- Next election: November 7, 2028
- Redistricting: Legislative Control

Meeting place
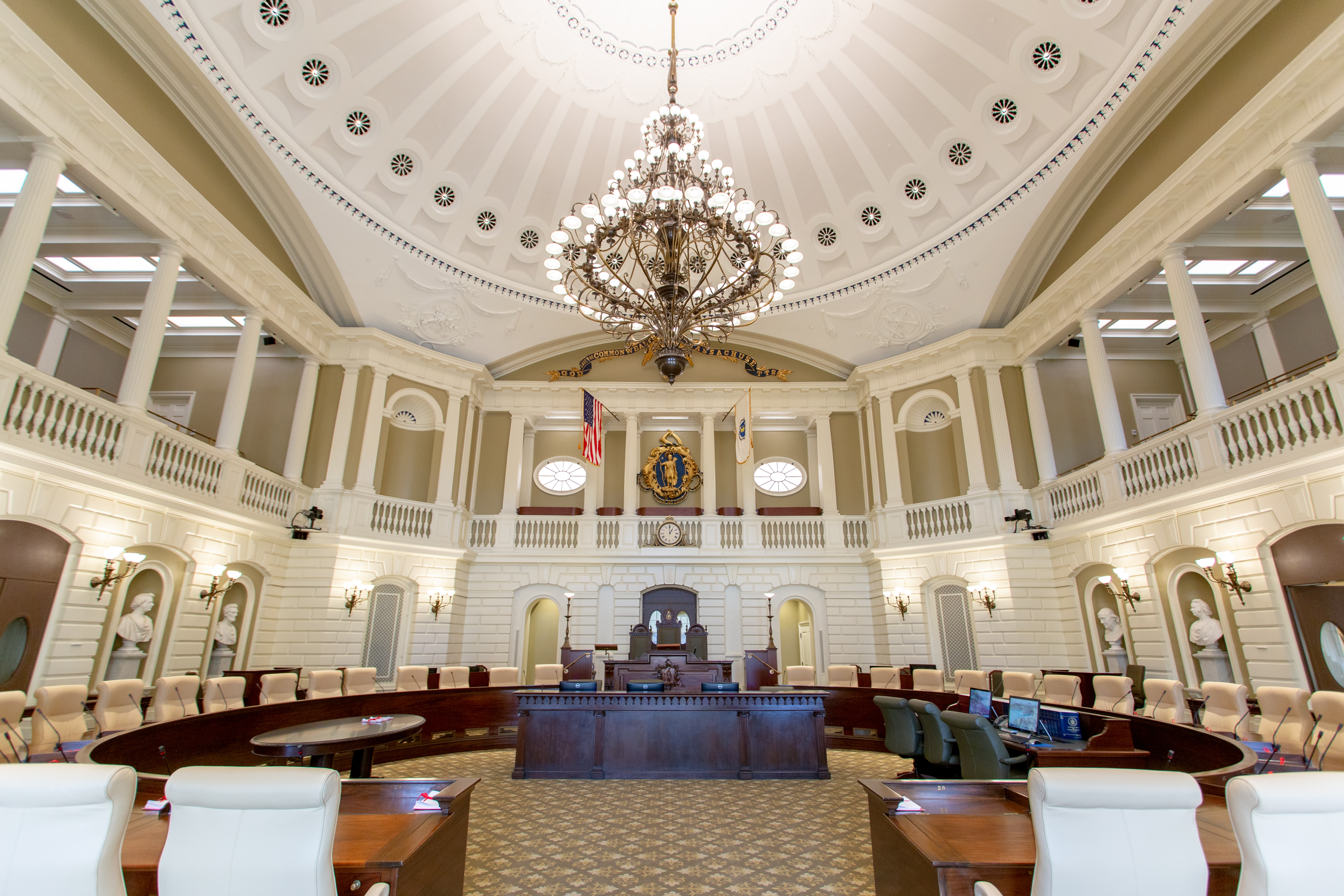
- State Senate Chamber; Massachusetts State House; Boston, Massachusetts

Website
- Massachusetts Senate

Rules
- Rules of the Massachusetts Senate

The Massachusetts Senate is the upper house of the Massachusetts General Court, the bicameral state legislature of the Commonwealth of Massachusetts. The Senate comprises 40 elected members from 40 single-member senatorial districts in the state. All but one of the districts are named for the counties in which they are located (the "Cape and Islands" district covers Dukes, Nantucket, and parts of Barnstable counties). Senators serve two-year terms, without term limits. The Senate convenes in the Massachusetts State House in Boston, the state capital.

== Qualifications ==
The following are the qualifications to be elected to the Massachusetts Senate:

- Be 18 years of age
- Be a registered voter in Massachusetts
- Be an inhabitant of Massachusetts for five years
- Be a resident of the district when elected
- Receive at least 300 signatures on nomination papers

== Recent party control ==
Democrats hold a supermajority in the Senate.

Affiliation	Party (Shading indicates majority caucus)		Total	Vacant
Affiliation	Democratic	Republican	Total	Vacant
Begin 189th (2015–2016)	34	6	40	0
Begin 190th (2017–2018)	34	6	40	0
Begin 191st (2019–2020)	34	6	40	0
Begin 192nd (2021–2022)	37	3	40	0
Begin 193rd (2023–2024)	37	3	40	0
End 193rd (2023–2024)	36	4	40	0
Begin 194th (2025–2026)	35	5	40	0
October 2, 2025	34	5	39	1
Latest voting share	87.2%	12.8%		

== Current members and districts ==
Massachusetts Senate districts are named for the counties that contain a portion of the district ordered by percentage of the district's population that is within that county. If multiple districts would have the same name under this scheme, they are also given an ordinal number. The one exception is "Cape and Islands" which if the naming scheme were followed would be "Barnstable, Dukes, and Nantucket".

- Berkshire, Hampden, Franklin, and Hampshire
- Bristol and Norfolk
- First Bristol and Plymouth
- Second Bristol and Plymouth
- Third Bristol and Plymouth
- Cape and Islands
- First Essex
- Second Essex
- Third Essex
- First Essex and Middlesex
- Second Essex and Middlesex
- Hampden
- Hampden and Hampshire
- Hampden, Hampshire, and Worcester
- Hampshire, Franklin, and Worcester
- First Middlesex
- Second Middlesex
- Third Middlesex
- Fourth Middlesex
- Fifth Middlesex
- Middlesex and Norfolk
- Middlesex and Suffolk
- Middlesex and Worcester
- Norfolk and Middlesex
- Norfolk and Plymouth
- Norfolk, Plymouth, and Bristol
- Norfolk and Suffolk
- Norfolk, Worcester, and Middlesex
- Plymouth and Barnstable
- First Plymouth and Norfolk
- Second Plymouth and Norfolk
- First Suffolk
- Second Suffolk
- Third Suffolk
- Suffolk and Middlesex
- First Worcester
- Second Worcester
- Worcester and Hampden
- Worcester and Hampshire
- Worcester and Middlesex

== Past composition of the Senate ==
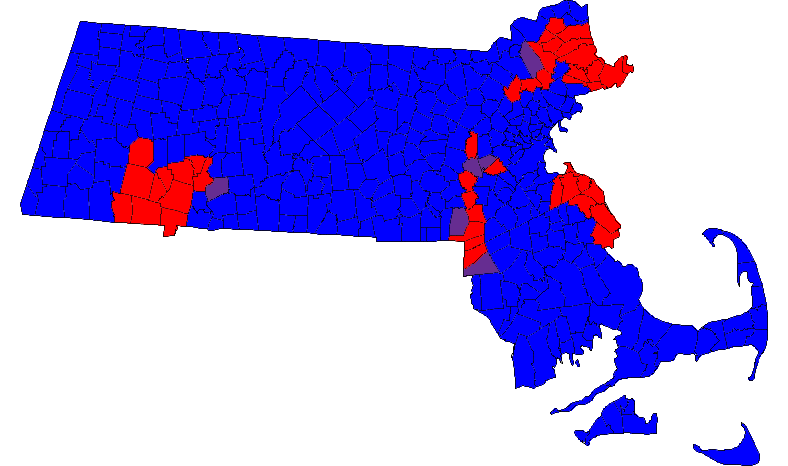
Composition by municipality in the 187th and 188th General Courts.

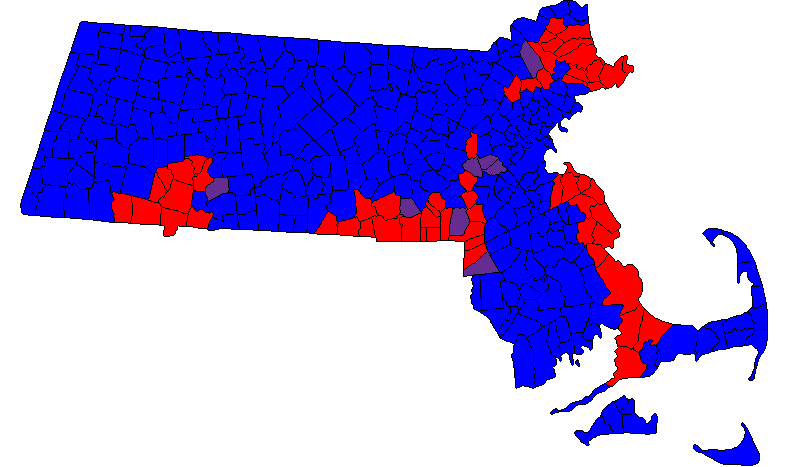
Composition by municipality in the 189th General Court and at the opening of 190th General Court.

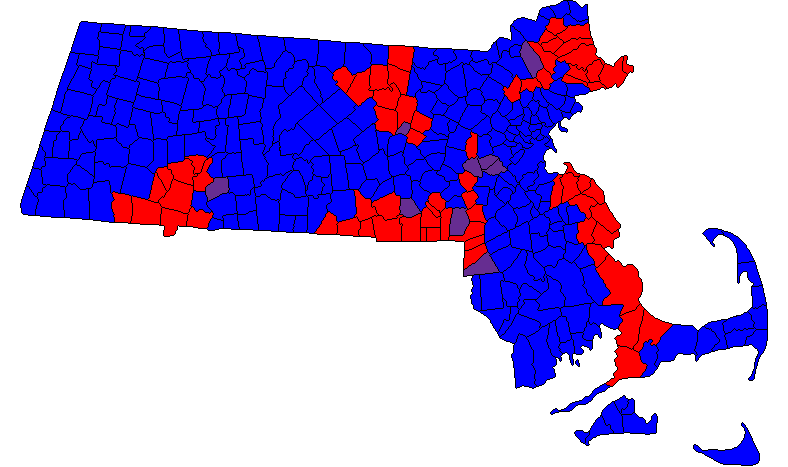
Composition by municipality in the 190th General Court beginning on December 5, 2017.

Composition by municipality at the beginning of the 191st General Court.

== See also ==
- 2025–2026 Massachusetts legislature
- List of former districts of the Massachusetts Senate
- List of Massachusetts Senate delegations
- Massachusetts House of Representatives
