= Massachusetts Senate's 4th Middlesex district =

American legislative district

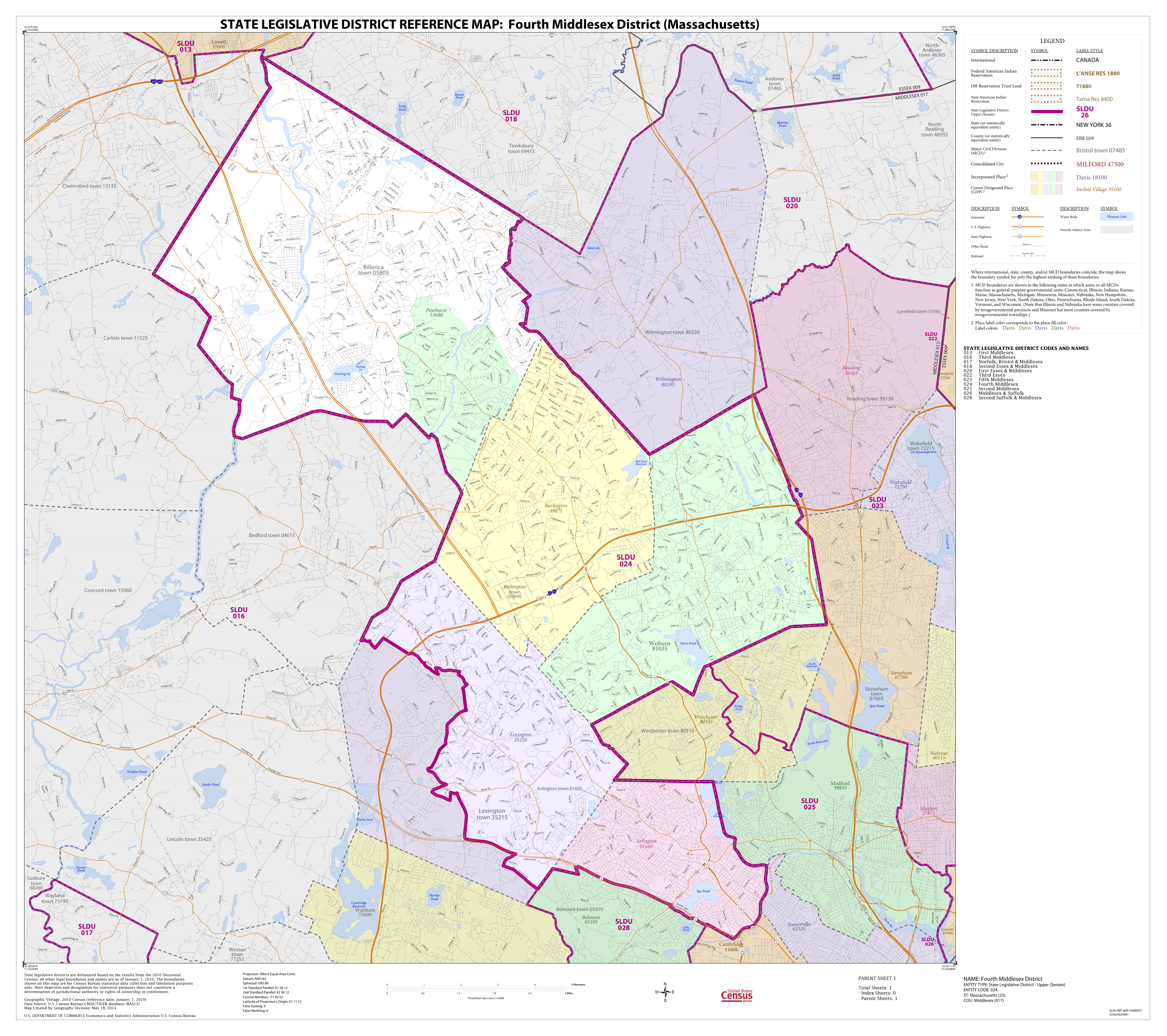
Map of Massachusetts Senate's 4th Middlesex district, based on the 2010 United States census.

Massachusetts Senate's 4th Middlesex district in the United States is one of 40 legislative districts of the Massachusetts Senate. It covers portions of Middlesex county. Democrat Cindy Friedman of Arlington has represented the district since 2017.

== Locales represented ==
The district includes the following localities:

- Arlington
- Billerica
- Burlington
- Lexington
- Woburn

=== Former locales ===
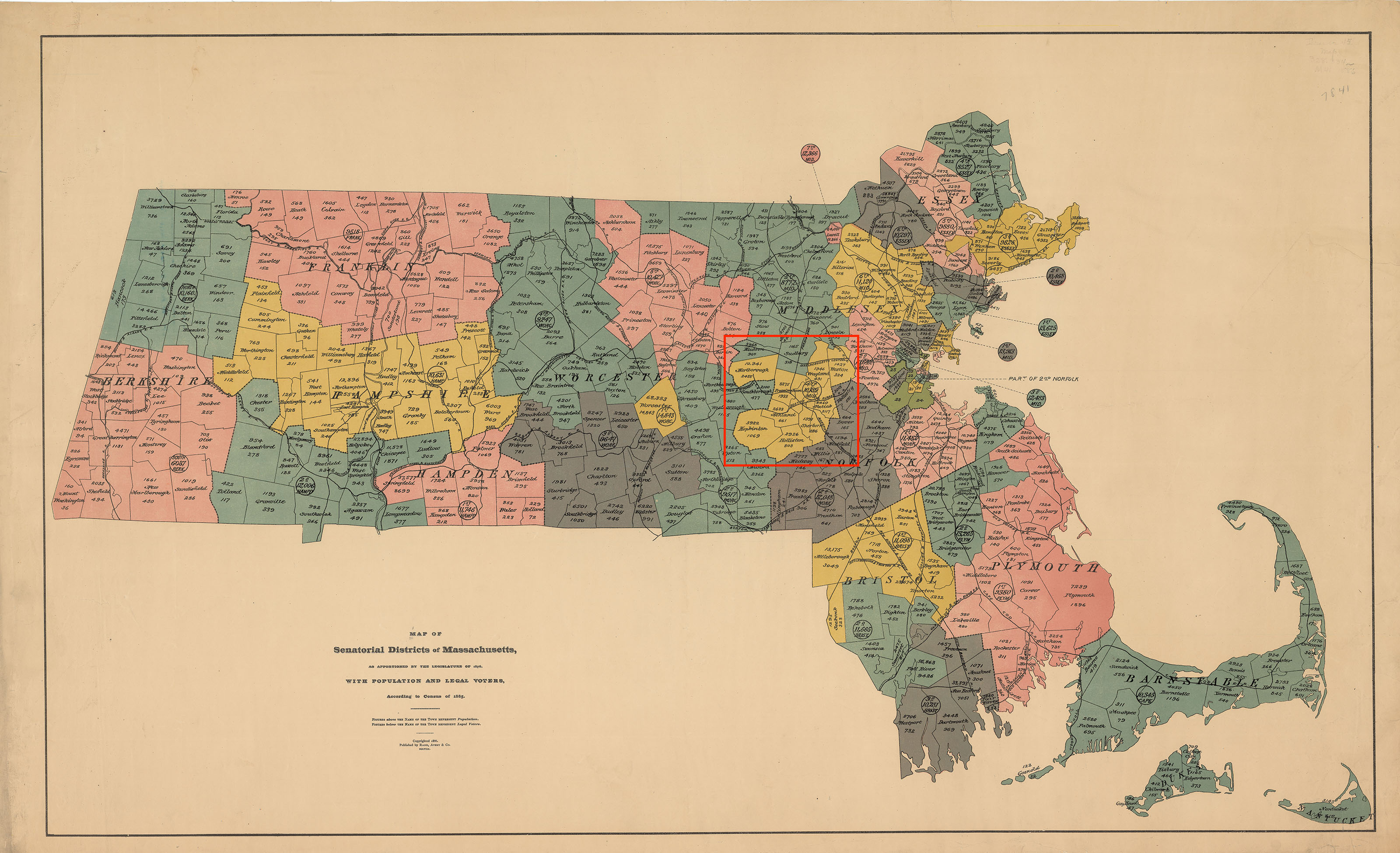
Map of the 1876 apportionment of the 4th Middlesex senatorial district

The district previously covered the following:

- Ashland, circa 1860s
- Framingham, circa 1860s
- Holliston, circa 1860s
- Hopkinton, circa 1860s
- Natick, circa 1860s
- Newton, circa 1860s
- Sherborn, circa 1860s
- Wayland, circa 1860s
- Weston, circa 1860s

== Senators ==
- George M. Brooks, circa 1859
- Charles Dean
- James Cavanagh
- Alvin Bliss
- Angier Louis Goodwin, circa 1935
- Sumner Gage Whittier, circa 1945
- Fred Irvin Lamson, circa 1957-1969
- John Bullock, circa 1975
- Samuel Rotondi, circa 1979
- Richard Arnold Kraus, circa 1985
- Robert Havern III, circa 1993-2002
- Cindy Friedman, July 27, 2017-current

== Images ==
Portraits of legislators

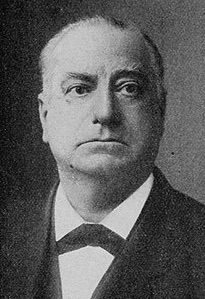
Charles Dean

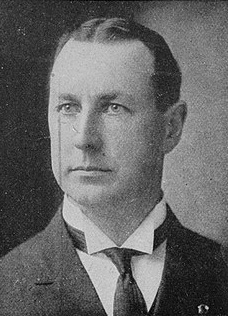
James Cavanagh

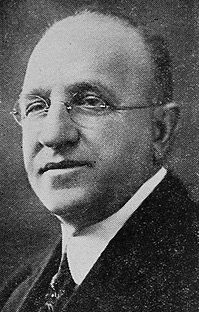
Alvin Bliss

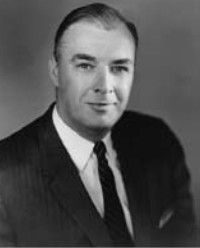
Sumner Whittier

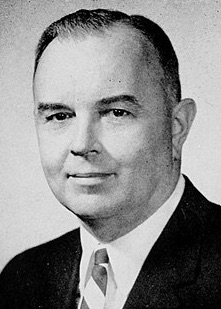
Fred Lamson

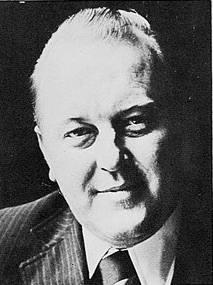
John Bullock

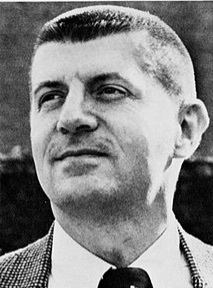
Richard Arnold Kraus

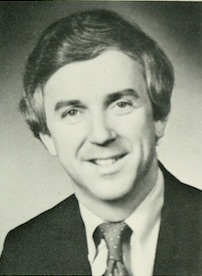
Robert Havern

== See also ==
- List of Massachusetts Senate elections
- List of Massachusetts General Courts
- List of former districts of the Massachusetts Senate
- Middlesex County districts of the Massachusetts House of Representatives: 1st, 2nd, 3rd, 4th, 5th, 6th, 7th, 8th, 9th, 10th, 11th, 12th, 13th, 14th, 15th, 16th, 17th, 18th, 19th, 20th, 21st, 22nd, 23rd, 24th, 25th, 26th, 27th, 28th, 29th, 30th, 31st, 32nd, 33rd, 34th, 35th, 36th, 37th
