= Massachusetts Senate's 1st Middlesex district =

American legislative district

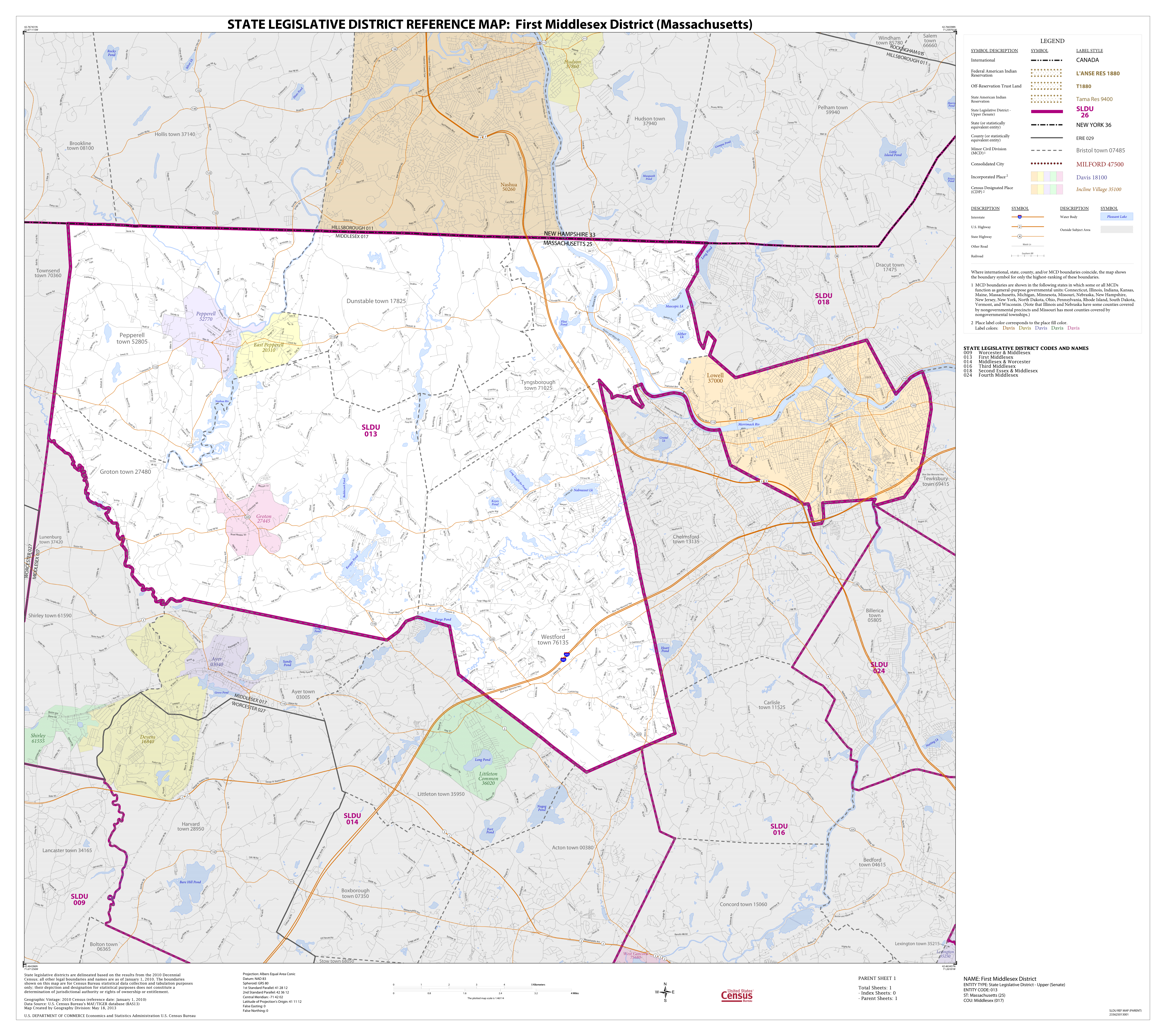
Map of Massachusetts Senate's 1st Middlesex district, based on the 2010 United States census.

Massachusetts Senate's 1st Middlesex district in the United States is one of 40 legislative districts of the Massachusetts Senate. It covers portions of Middlesex county. State Representative Vanna Howard was elected to this seat on March 3, 2026 to fill the vacancy left by the death of previous Senator Ed Kennedy.

== Locales represented ==
(As of the 2020 census.) The district includes the following localities:

- Dunstable

Dracut

- Lowell
- Pepperell
- Tyngsborough

The current district geographic boundary overlaps with those of the Massachusetts House of Representatives' 1st Middlesex, 16th Middlesex, 17th Middlesex, 18th Middlesex, and 36th Middlesex districts.

== Former locale ==
The district previously covered Charlestown, circa 1860s.

== Senators ==
- E.L. Norton, circa 1859
- Andrew J. Bailey, circa 1874
- James Vahey
- James MacPherson
- Abbott Rice
- Arthur W. Hollis, circa 1935
- Joseph F. Montminy, circa 1945
- Paul Achin, circa 1953
- Edward Joseph DeSaulnier, Jr., circa 1957
- John Edward Harrington, Jr., circa 1969
- Bernard Joseph Tully, circa 1979
- Philip Shea, circa 1983
- Paul J. Sheehy, circa 1985
- Nancy Achin Sullivan, circa 1991
- Daniel P. Leahy, circa 1993
- Steven C. Panagiotakos, circa 2002
- Eileen Donoghue
- Edward J. Kennedy, 2019–2025
- Vanna Howard, March 18, 2026–present

== Images ==
Portraits of legislators

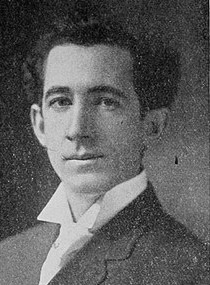
James Vahey

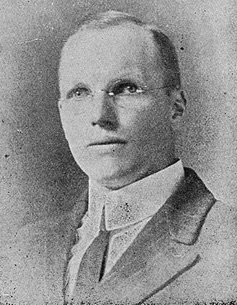
James MacPherson

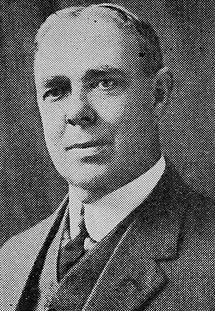
Abbott Rice

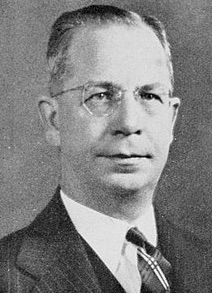
Joseph Montminy

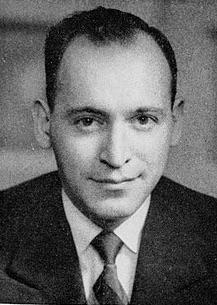
Paul Achin

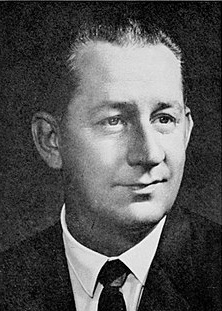
John Edward Harrington

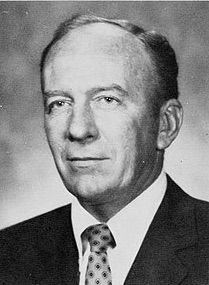
Bernard Joseph Tully

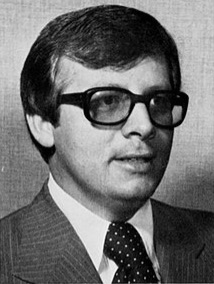
Philip Shea

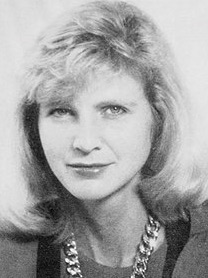
Nancy Achin Sullivan

== See also ==
- List of Massachusetts Senate elections
- List of Massachusetts General Courts
- List of former districts of the Massachusetts Senate
- Other Middlesex County districts of the Massachusett Senate: 2nd, 3rd, 4th, 5th; 1st Essex and Middlesex; 2nd Essex and Middlesex; 1st Middlesex and Norfolk, 2nd Middlesex and Norfolk; Middlesex and Suffolk; Middlesex and Worcester; Norfolk, Bristol and Middlesex; 1st Suffolk and Middlesex; 2nd Suffolk and Middlesex
- Middlesex County districts of the Massachusetts House of Representatives: 1st, 2nd, 3rd, 4th, 5th, 6th, 7th, 8th, 9th, 10th, 11th, 12th, 13th, 14th, 15th, 16th, 17th, 18th, 19th, 20th, 21st, 22nd, 23rd, 24th, 25th, 26th, 27th, 28th, 29th, 30th, 31st, 32nd, 33rd, 34th, 35th, 36th, 37th
