= John Drinkwater (politician) =

American politician

Member-elect of the Massachusetts House of Representatives from the 17th Middlesex district
- Assuming office January 2027
- Succeeding: Vanna Howard

Personal details
- Party: Democratic

John Drinkwater is an American politician. A member of the Democratic Party, he is the member-elect for the 17th Middlesex district of the Massachusetts House of Representatives.
