= Arthur W. Hollis =

Massachusetts politician (1877–1947)

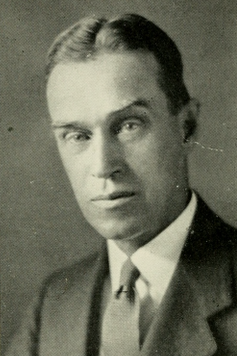
- Arthur W. Hollis

Member of the Massachusetts Senate from the 1st Middlesex district
- In office 1929–1942

Member of the Massachusetts House of Representatives from the 4th Middlesex district
- In office 1925–1928

Personal details
- Born: April 29, 1877 Newton, Massachusetts, US
- Died: May 14, 1947 (aged 70)
- Education: Harvard College (BA)

Arthur W. Hollis (April 29, 1877– May 14, 1947) was an American politician who was the member of the Massachusetts House of Representatives from the 4th Middlesex district and a member of the Massachusetts Senate from the 1st Middlesex district.
