= Vanna Howard =

Cambodian-born American politician

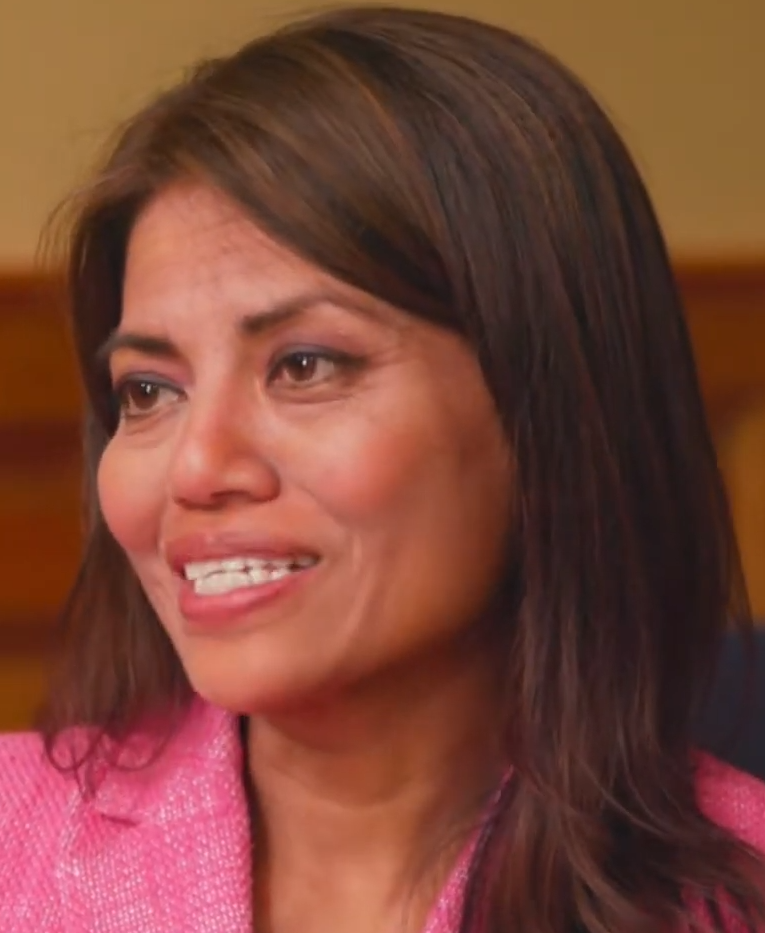
- Howard in 2022

Member of the Massachusetts Senate from the 1st Middlesex district
- Incumbent
- Assumed office March 18, 2026
- Preceded by: Edward J. Kennedy

Member of the Massachusetts House of Representatives from the 17th Middlesex district
- In office January 6, 2021 – March 17, 2026
- Preceded by: David Nangle
- Succeeded by: John Drinkwater (elect)

Personal details
- Born: Cambodia
- Party: Democratic
- Education: UMass Boston

Vanna Howard is a Cambodian-born American politician serving as a member of the Massachusetts Senate, representing the 1st Middlesex district. A member of the Democratic Party, her district includes Dunstable, Dracut, Lowell, Pepperell, and Tyngsborough.

She previously served on the Massachusetts House of Representatives, representing the 17th Middlesex district. In March 2026, she won a special election to fill the Massachusetts Senate's 1st Middlesex district, which had been vacant since the death of senator Ed Kennedy.

== Early life and career ==
Born in Cambodia, Howard's father, siblings, and grandparents were killed by the Khmer Rouge in the Cambodian genocide. After fleeing Cambodia in 1979, Howard, along with her mother and stepfather, resettled in a refugee camp and two years later, in the Brighton neighborhood of Boston. She recalls her early days in the United States, while she learned English, as "very lonely."

Howard attended the University of Massachusetts Boston and moved to Lowell in 1991 when she was hired as a bilingual legal secretary.

== Political career ==
Howard served on the staff of Congresswoman Niki Tsongas from 2008 to 2019, first as a constituent services representative and later as regional director for the Greater Lowell area.

In 2020, Howard sought the Democratic nomination for the 17th Middlesex District of the Massachusetts House of Representatives. She defeated the eleven term incumbent David Nangle, who had been indicted on federal fraud charges, and won the general election unopposed.

Howard is the first Khmer woman to serve in the Massachusetts General Court. In 2023, a resolution sponsored by Howard to recognize Cambodian Genocide Remembrance Day was adopted by the House.

On March 3, 2026, she was elected to the Massachusetts Senate for the 1st Middlesex district in a special election held to fill the vacancy caused by the death of incumbent Ed Kennedy. She defeated fellow state representative Rodney Elliot in the Democratic primary, and Republican Sam Meas and independent Joe Espinola in the general election. She assumed office on March 18, 2026.

=== Committee Assignments ===
- Chairperson, Joint Committee on Emergency Preparedness and Management
- Vice Chair, Joint Committee on Higher Education
- Joint Committee on Environment and Natural Resources
- Joint Committee on Municipalities and Regional Government
- Joint Committee on Tourism, Arts and Cultural Development

== See also ==
- 2021–2022 Massachusetts legislature
