= Nancy Achin Sullivan =

Massachusetts politician (1959–2022)

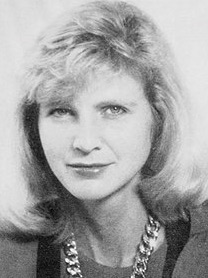
- Sullivan in 1991

Member of the Massachusetts Senate from the 1st Middlesex district
- In office January 2, 1991 – January 5, 1993

Personal details
- Born: January 20, 1959 Lowell, Massachusetts, U.S.
- Died: February 25, 2022 (aged 63) Andover, Massachusetts, U.S.
- Spouse(s): Arthur Sullivan (m. 1984) Henry Audesse (m. 1997; died 2015) David Kellogg (m. 2018)

Nancy Elaine Achin Sullivan (January 20, 1959 – February 25, 2022) was an American Republican politician from Lowell, Massachusetts. She represented the 1st Middlesex district in the Massachusetts Senate from 1991 to 1993 and was a Republican. She retired after a single term to undergo chemotherapy for breast cancer.

Sullivan was born in Lowell, Massachusetts, on January 20, 1959. A four-time cancer survivor, she served as executive director of the Massachusetts Board of Registration in Medicine from 1999 until 2008. Sullivan went to the Academy of Notre Dame in Lowell, Massachusetts and to Radcliffe College. She died in Andover, Massachusetts, on February 25, 2022, at the age of 63.

== See also ==
- 1991-1992 Massachusetts legislature
