= David Nangle =

American politician

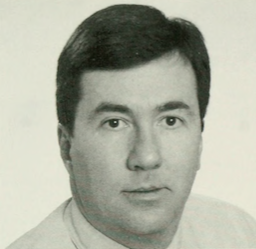
- David Nangle, circa 2005

Member of the Massachusetts House of Representatives
- In office 1999–2020
- Preceded by: Edward A. LeLacheur
- Succeeded by: Vanna Howard
- Constituency: 18th Middlesex (1999-2003); 17th Middlesex (2003-2020)

Personal details
- Born: December 18, 1960 (age 65)
- Party: Democratic

David M. Nangle (born December 18, 1960) is an American politician who served in the Massachusetts House of Representatives from 1999 to 2020. He is a Lowell resident and a member of the Democratic Party. While a member of the House, he served as the chair of the House Ethics committee. In February 2021, Nangle pleaded guilty to charges of wire fraud, bank fraud, making false statements to a bank, and filing false tax returns and was sentenced to 15 months in prison and two years of supervised release. He was released from federal custody on November 10, 2022.

== Early life and education ==
Nangle grew up in Lowell, Massachusetts and graduated from Lowell High School in 1978.

== Political career ==
Nangle was first elected to represent the 18th Middlesex district in 1998 defeating Republican Karen Simao with 60.9% of the vote. Following redistricting after the 2000 Census, Nangle began to serve as the representative for the 17th Middlesex district starting in 2003. Under speaker Robert DeLeo, Nangle became chair of the Massachusetts House Ethics committee and a member of DeLeo's leadership team, serving as one of the floor division chairs. Following the federal indictment, Nangle resigned his leadership positions in February 2020. In November 2020, Nangle lost the 2020 Democratic primary election for the 17th Middlesex District to Vanna Howard.

== 2020 federal arrest ==
On February 18, 2020, Nangle was arrested by both the FBI and IRS on federal charges alleging that he raided his campaign account to pay for personal expenses and sustain a gambling habit at various casinos around the New England area. According to the federal indictment, "NANGLE illicitly used campaign funds to, among other things: (i) pay for personal expenses (ii) defraud his bank lender, and (iii) collect income that he failed to report to the Internal Revenue Service."

The indictment charged Nangle with 10 counts of wire fraud, four counts of bank fraud, nine counts of making false statements to a bank, and five counts of filing false income tax returns. He pleaded not guilty and was released $25,000 bond and ordered to surrender his passport and to refrain from gambling.

On February 24, 2021, Nangle pleaded guilty to charges of 10 counts of wire fraud, four counts of bank fraud, four counts of making false statements to a bank and five counts of filing false tax returns. On September 15, 2021, Nangle was sentenced to 15 months in prison followed by two years of supervised release. He was also ordered to pay $33,347 to the IRS and a forfeiture of $15,650. He was ordered to report to FMC Devens to serve his sentence before November 1, 2021. Nangle was released from prison in April 2022 and served the remainder of his sentence in community confinement.

== Committee assignments ==
- House Committee on Ethics
- House Committee on Rules
- Joint Committee on Rules

== See also ==
- 2019–2020 Massachusetts legislature

Massachusetts House of Representatives
Preceded by Edward A. LeLacheur	Member of the Massachusetts House of Representatives from the 18th Middlesex district 1999–2003	Succeeded by Kevin J. Murphy
Preceded by Thomas Golden Jr.	Member of the Massachusetts House of Representatives from the 17th Middlesex district 2003–2020	Succeeded by Vanna Howard
