= Edward J. Kennedy =

American politician (1951–2025)

Ed Kennedy
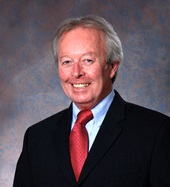
- Kennedy in 2019

Member of the Massachusetts Senate from the 1st Middlesex district
- In office January 2, 2019 – October 1, 2025
- Preceded by: Eileen Donoghue
- Succeeded by: Vanna Howard

90th Mayor of Lowell
- In office January 6, 2016 – January 2, 2018
- Preceded by: Rodney M. Elliott
- Succeeded by: William Samaras

Personal details
- Born: March 24, 1951 Lowell, Massachusetts, U.S.
- Died: October 1, 2025 (aged 74) Lowell, Massachusetts, U.S.
- Party: Democratic
- Spouse: Susan Kennedy
- Education: Boston University (BA); Framingham State University (MPA)
- Occupation: State Senator
- Website: Official website

Edward James Kennedy Jr. (March 24, 1951 – October 1, 2025) was an American politician who was a member of the Massachusetts Senate from the 1st Middlesex district from 2019 until his death. He had previously served as the 90th Mayor of Lowell (2016–2018).

== Early life and education ==
Kennedy was born on March 24, 1951. He held a Master's Degree in Public Administration from Framingham State University, and a Bachelor of Arts degree from Boston University.

Prior to being elected to the Senate, he worked as a commercial real estate appraiser. He was a long-time member of the Massachusetts Democratic State Committee, the Sierra Club and the Appalachian Mountain Club.

== Political career ==
Kennedy served on the city council for Lowell, Massachusetts, from 1978 through 1985, and on the county commission for Middlesex County, Massachusetts, from 1992 through 1996. After his time on the Lowell City Council and Middlesex Commission, he decided to run for Middlesex County Sheriff in 1996. Kennedy lost the Democratic nomination to Sheriff James DiPaola. He tried another run in 1998, but lost the nomination to DiPaola, once more. He was again elected to the Lowell City Council in 2011, after a 27-year hiatus from it, and a 13-year hiatus from politics. Then he was re-elected again in 2014, 2016, and 2018. But, during his third-straight term in 2016, he was elected to be Lowell's 90th mayor after the City Council's 9–0 vote. After his stint as Mayor, and with 20 years of government experience in his back pocket, Kennedy decided to run for higher office. After a close fought Democratic Primary, then a swift general election night win, he was elected to the Massachusetts Senate. Kennedy was sworn in on January 2, 2019.

=== Committee memberships ===
Kennedy served on seven legislative committees in the Massachusetts Legislature:

- Joint Committee on Tourism, Arts and Cultural Development (chair)
- Joint Committee on Community Development and Small Businesses (Vice Chair)
- Joint Committee on Elder Affairs
- Joint Committee on Election Laws
- Joint Committee on Environment, Natural Resources and Agriculture
- Joint Committee on Higher Education
- Joint Committee on Municipalities and Regional Government

== Personal life and death ==
Despite sharing the first name and last name of the United States Senator from Massachusetts, who was also named Edward Kennedy, he was not related to the Kennedys of Massachusetts. Kennedy was married to Susan Kennedy. In his free time, he hiked and spent time with his three grandsons.

Kennedy died at a hospital in Lowell, Massachusetts on October 1, 2025, at the age of 74.

== Electoral history ==
1996 Democratic Primary for Middlesex County Sheriff
Party	Candidate	Votes	%
Democratic	James DiPaola	32,577	46.6%
Democratic	Edward J. Kennedy Jr.	21,091	30.2%
Democratic	Edward J. Rideout	10,500	15.1%
Democratic	Leonard H. Golder	5,613	8.1%
Total votes		69,781	100.00

1998 Democratic Primary for Middlesex County Sheriff
Party	Candidate	Votes	%
Democratic	James DiPaola	101,924	65.8%
Democratic	Edward J. Kennedy Jr.	52,772	34.2%
Total votes		154,701	100.00

2016 Lowell, Massachusetts Mayoral Election
Party	Candidate	Votes	%
Nonpartisan	Edward J. Kennedy Jr.	9	100%
Total votes		9	100.00

2018 Democratic Primary for the Massachusetts State Senate 1st Middlesex District
Party	Candidate	Votes	%
Democratic	Edward J. Kennedy Jr.	4,669	26.6%
Democratic	John Drinkwater	4,212	23.9%
Democratic	Rodney Elliot	3,557	20.2%
Democratic	Terry Ryan	2,841	16.1%
Democratic	William Martin Jr.	2,312	13.1%
Total votes		17,591	100.00

2018 General Election for the Massachusetts State Senate 1st Middlesex District
Party	Candidate	Votes	%
Democratic	Edward J. Kennedy Jr.	35,068	63.9%
Republican	John MacDonald	19,825	36.1%
Total votes		44,893	100.00
Democratic hold			

2020 Democratic Primary for the Massachusetts State Senate 1st Middlesex District
Party	Candidate	Votes	%
Democratic	Edward J. Kennedy Jr.	21,890	99.2%
Write-in		177	0.8%
Total votes		22,067	100.00%

2020 General Election for the Massachusetts State Senate 1st Middlesex District
Party	Candidate	Votes	%
Democratic	Edward J. Kennedy Jr.	56,791	98.8%
Write-in		706	1.2%
Total votes		57,497	100.00%
Democratic hold			

== See also ==
- 2019–2020 Massachusetts legislature
- 2021–2022 Massachusetts legislature

Government offices
Preceded by Rodney M. Elliott	90th Mayor of Lowell; 2016–2018	Succeeded by William Samaras
Massachusetts Senate
Preceded by Eileen Donoghue	Member of the Massachusetts Senate from the 1st Middlesex district 2019–2025	Succeeded by Vanna Howard
