= Massachusetts House of Representatives' 36th Middlesex district =

American legislative district

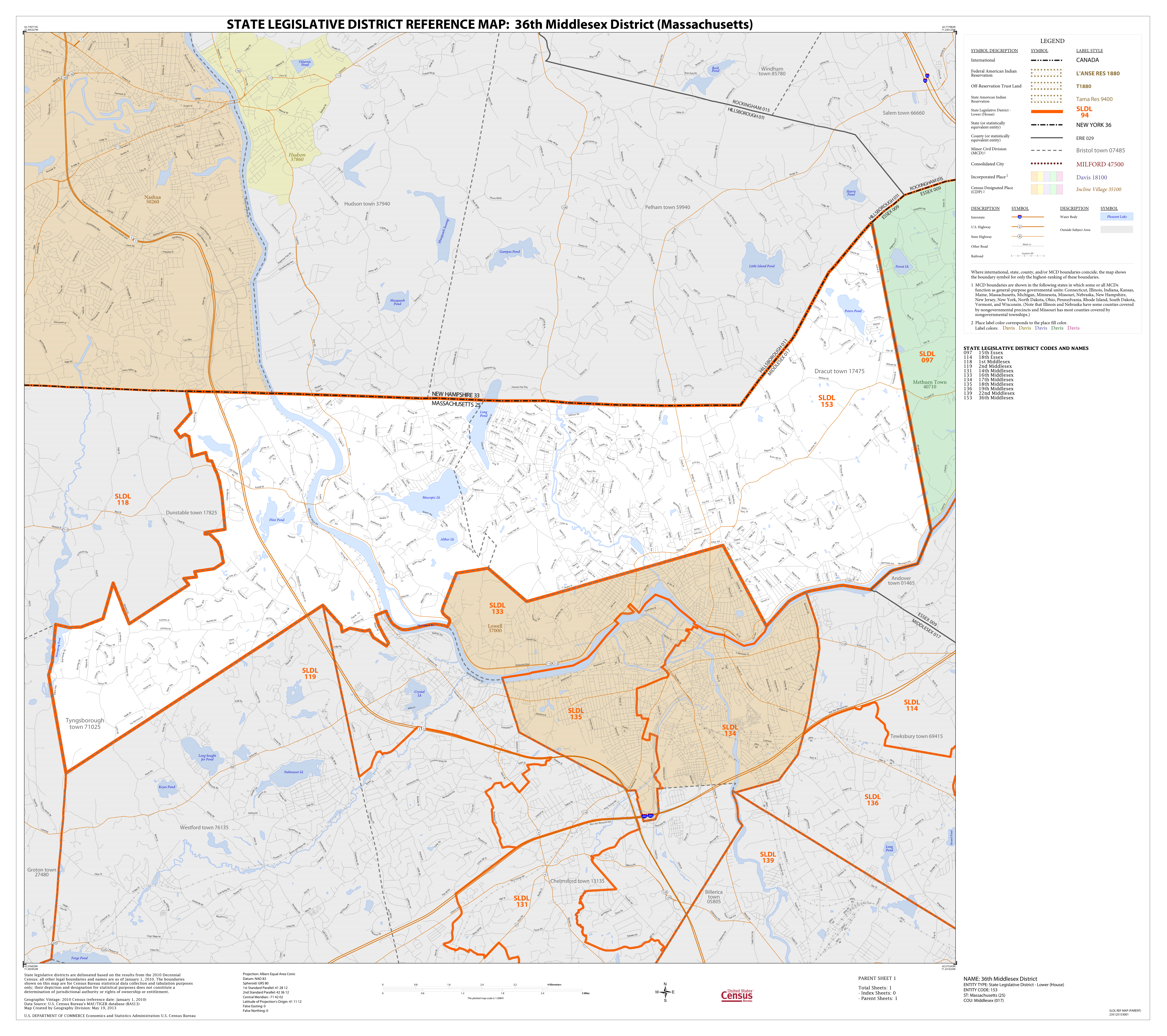
Map of Massachusetts House of Representatives' 36th Middlesex district, based on the 2010 United States census.

Massachusetts House of Representatives' 36th Middlesex district in the United States is one of 160 legislative districts included in the lower house of the Massachusetts General Court. It covers Dracut and Tyngsborough in Middlesex County. Since 2003, Colleen M. Garry of the Democratic Party has represented the district.

The current district geographic boundary overlaps with those of the Massachusetts Senate's 2nd Essex and Middlesex district and 1st Middlesex district.

== Representatives ==
- Fred Cain
- John McNeil
- James V. DiPaola
- Christopher G. Fallon
- Colleen M. Garry, 2003–current

== See also ==
- List of Massachusetts House of Representatives elections
- List of Massachusetts General Courts
- Other Middlesex County districts of the Massachusetts House of Representatives: 1st, 2nd, 3rd, 4th, 5th, 6th, 7th, 8th, 9th, 10th, 11th, 12th, 13th, 14th, 15th, 16th, 17th, 18th, 19th, 20th, 21st, 22nd, 23rd, 24th, 25th, 26th, 27th, 28th, 29th, 30th, 31st, 32nd, 33rd, 34th, 35th, 37th
- List of former districts of the Massachusetts House of Representatives

== Images ==
Portraits of legislators

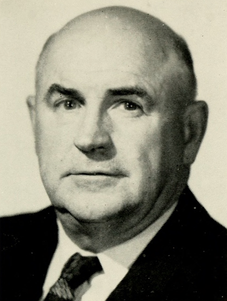
Fred Cain

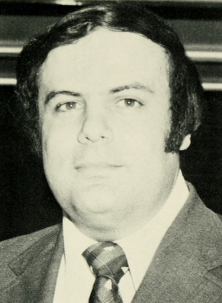
John McNeil

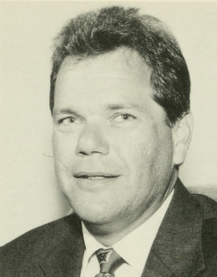
James DiPaola

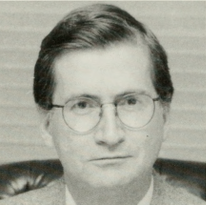
Christopher Fallon

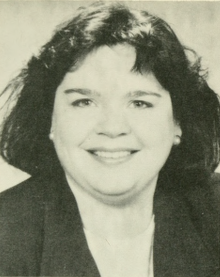
Colleen Garry
