= Massachusetts House of Representatives' 22nd Middlesex district =

American legislative district

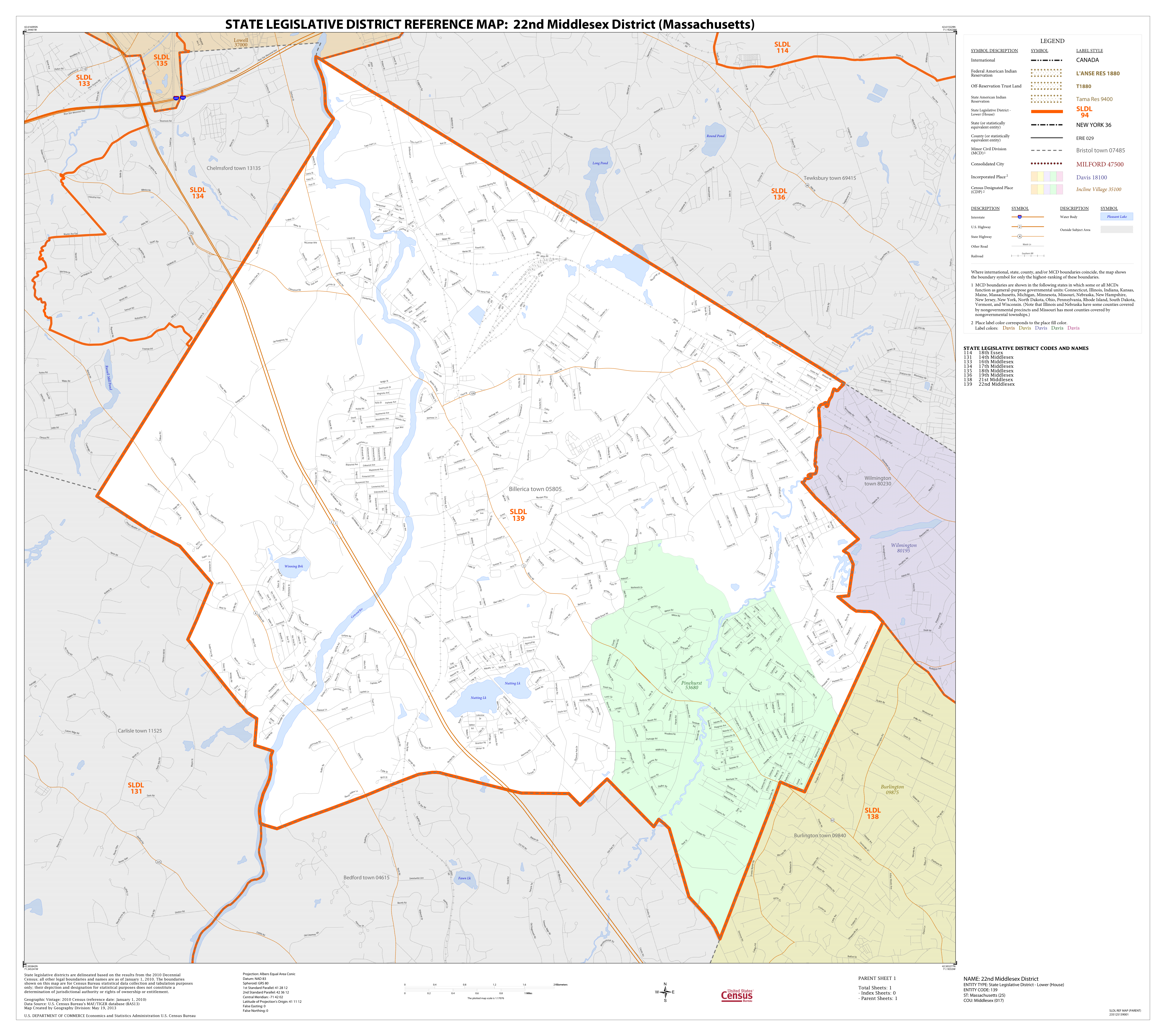
Map of Massachusetts House of Representatives' 22nd Middlesex district, based on the 2010 United States census.

Massachusetts House of Representatives' 22nd Middlesex district in the United States is one of 160 legislative districts included in the lower house of the Massachusetts General Court. It covers the town of Billerica in Middlesex County. Republican Marc Lombardo of Billerica has represented the district since 2011.

The current district geographic boundary overlaps with that of the Massachusetts Senate's 4th Middlesex district.

== Representatives ==
- Dana Holden, circa 1858
- Jacob Coggin, circa 1859
- Francis W. Qua, circa 1888
- Harry C Woodill, circa 1920
- Charles Gibbons, circa 1951
- Joseph A. Milano, circa 1951
- Theodore Jack Vaitses, circa 1951
- Robert M. Penta, circa 1975
- William Cass
- Richard Tisei, 1985–1991
- Brian Cresta
- William G. Greene Jr.
- Marc T. Lombardo, 2011–current

== Former locale ==
The district previously covered Woburn, circa 1872.

== See also ==
- List of Massachusetts House of Representatives elections
- List of Massachusetts General Courts
- List of former districts of the Massachusetts House of Representatives
- Other Middlesex County districts of the Massachusetts House of Representatives: 1st, 2nd, 3rd, 4th, 5th, 6th, 7th, 8th, 9th, 10th, 11th, 12th, 13th, 14th, 15th, 16th, 17th, 18th, 19th, 20th, 21st, 23rd, 24th, 25th, 26th, 27th, 28th, 29th, 30th, 31st, 32nd, 33rd, 34th, 35th, 36th, 37th

== Images ==
Portraits of legislators

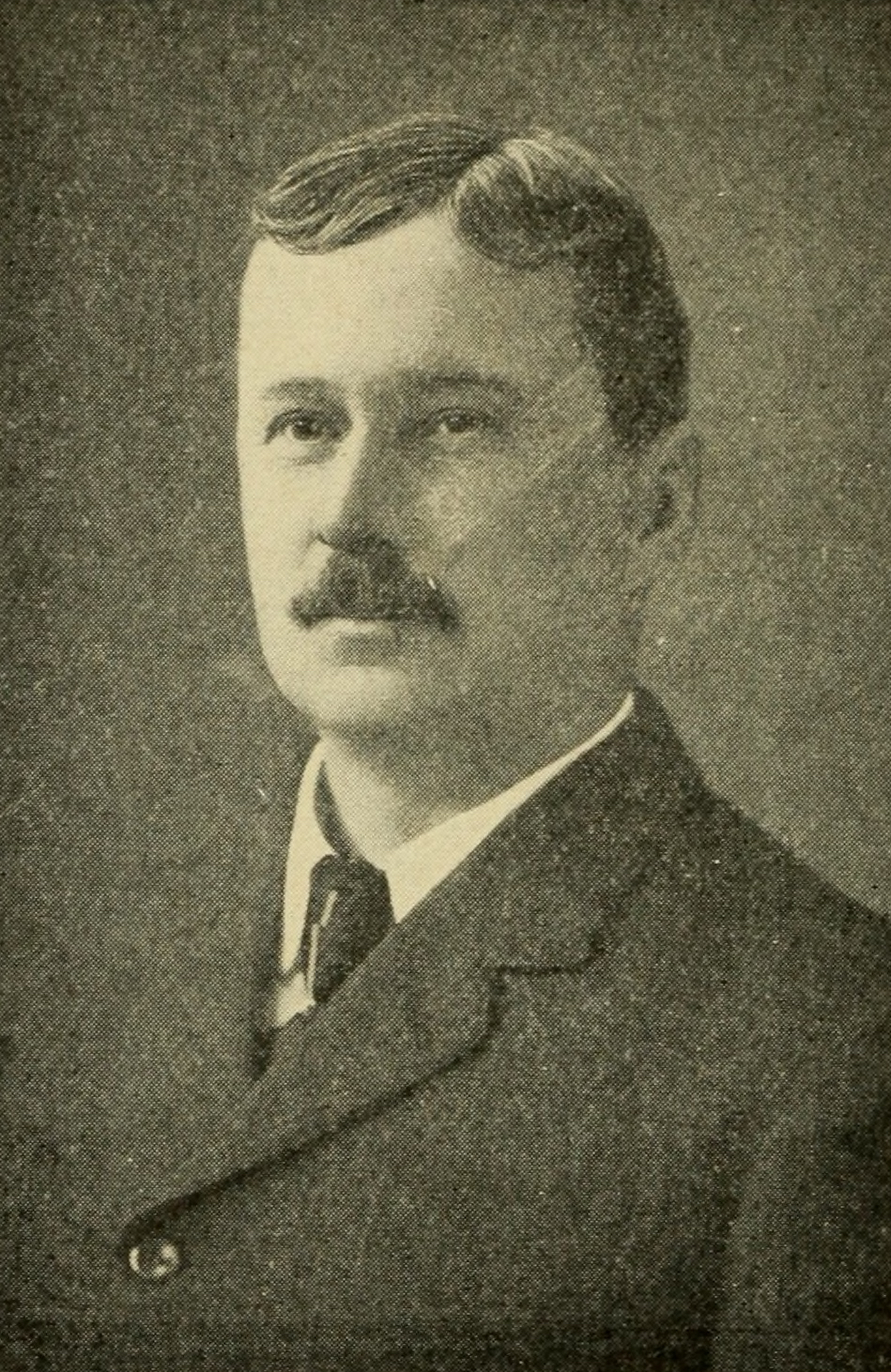
Andrew Burnett

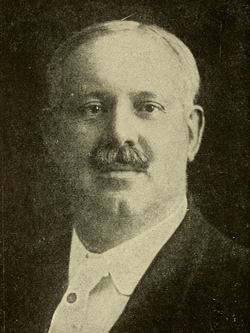
Harry Woodill

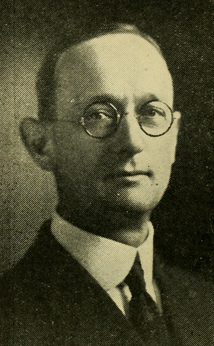
Charles Gilmore

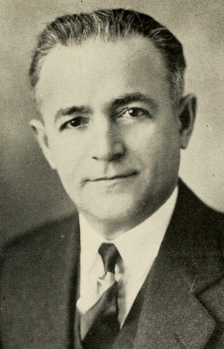
Joseph Milano

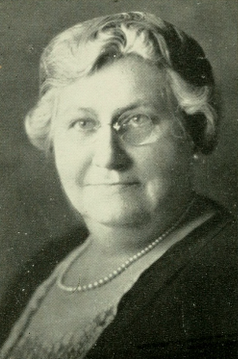
Mary Livermore Barrows

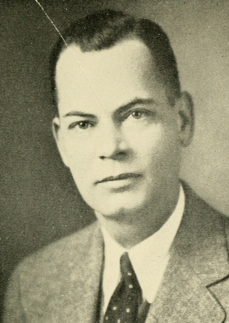
Charles Gibbons

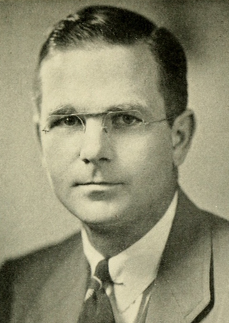
George Evans

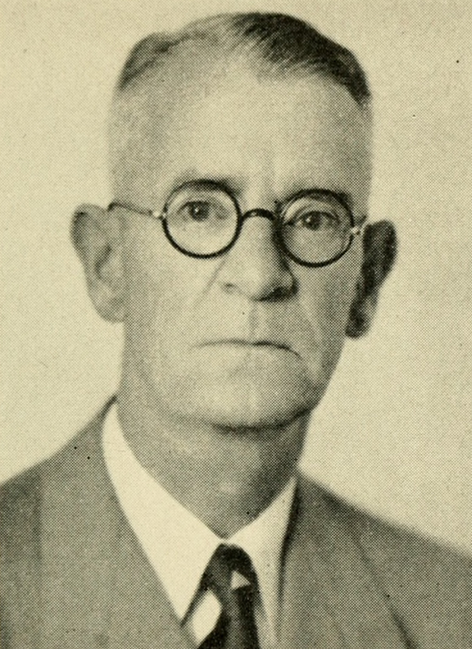
Gardner Campbell

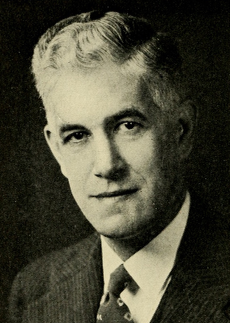
Theodore Jack Vaitses

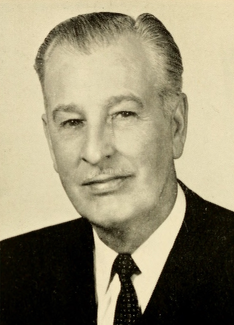
Lloyd Conn

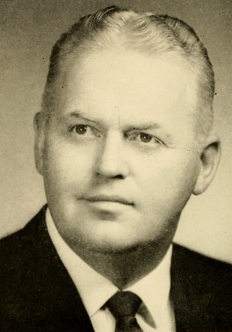
William Robinson

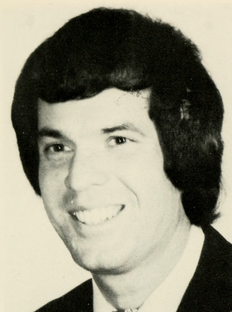
Robert Penta

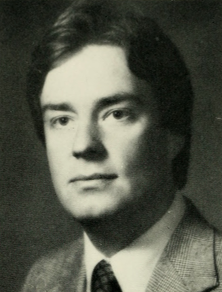
Alfred Minahan

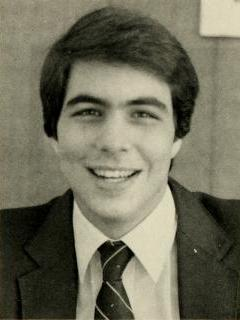
Richard Tisei

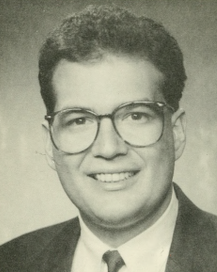
Brian Cresta

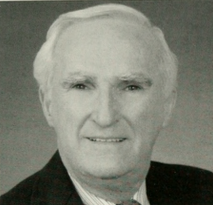
William Greene
