= Massachusetts House of Representatives' 18th Middlesex district =

American legislative district

Massachusetts House of Representatives' 18th Middlesex district in the United States is one of 160 legislative districts included in the lower house of the Massachusetts General Court. It covers part of the city of Lowell in Middlesex County. Democrat Tara Hong of Lowell has represented the district since 2025.

The current district geographic boundary overlaps with that of the Massachusetts Senate's 1st Middlesex district.

== Representatives ==
- Charles K. Tucker, circa 1858
- A. W. Crowninshield, circa 1859
- Samuel Otis Upham, circa 1888
- Erskine Warden, circa 1888
- Samuel W. Mendum, circa 1920
- Walter S. Parker, circa 1920
- Frank Daniel Tanner, circa 1951
- Malcolm Stuart White, circa 1951
- David J. Mofenson, circa 1975
- David Nangle, 1999–2003
- Kevin J. Murphy
- Rady Mom, 2015–2025
- Tara Hong, 2025–Current

== Former locales ==
The district previously covered:

- Boxborough, circa 1872
- Hudson, circa 1872
- Littleton, circa 1872
- Stow, circa 1872

== See also ==
- List of Massachusetts House of Representatives elections
- List of Massachusetts General Courts
- List of former districts of the Massachusetts House of Representatives
- Other Middlesex County districts of the Massachusetts House of Representatives: 1st, 2nd, 3rd, 4th, 5th, 6th, 7th, 8th, 9th, 10th, 11th, 12th, 13th, 14th, 15th, 16th, 17th, 19th, 20th, 21st, 22nd, 23rd, 24th, 25th, 26th, 27th, 28th, 29th, 30th, 31st, 32nd, 33rd, 34th, 35th, 36th, 37th

== Images ==
Portraits of legislators

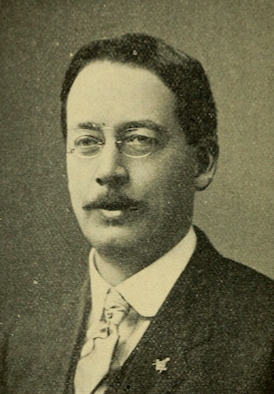
Hamlet Greenwood

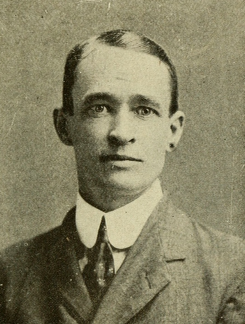
Arthur Newhall

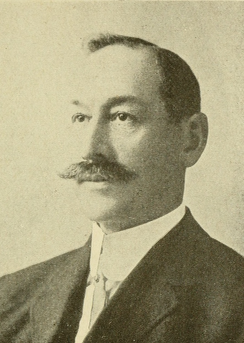
Fred Johnson Brown

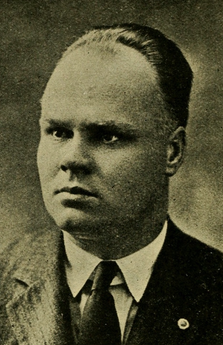
Gustave Everberg

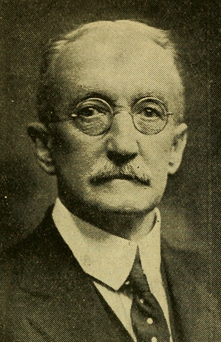
Lemuel Standish

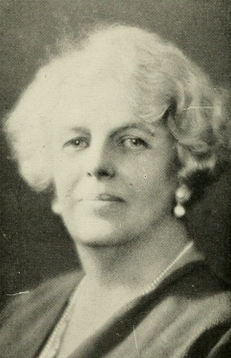
Mollie Ashby Sweetser

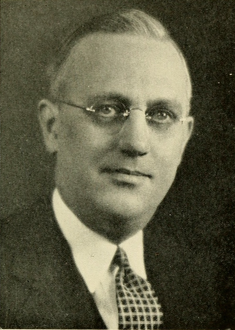
Herman Peterson

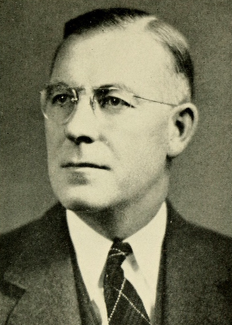
Logan Dickie

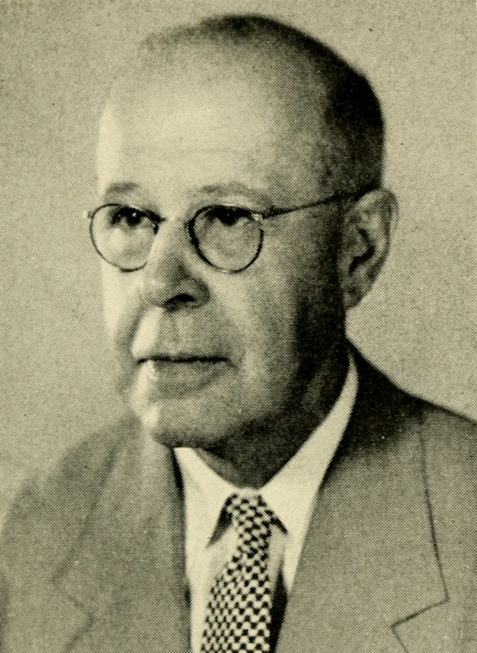
Charles Wilkinson

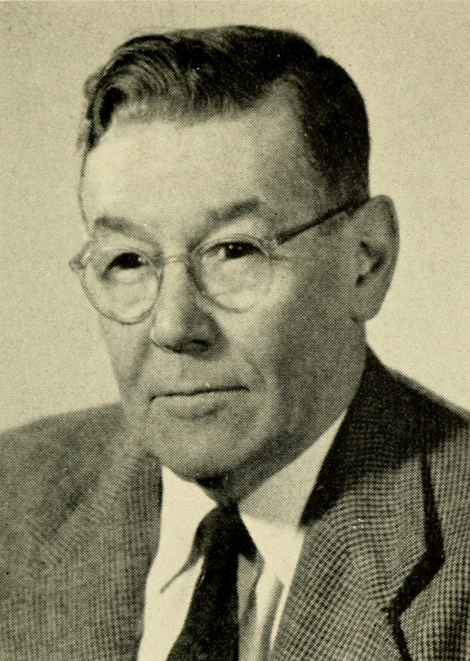
Frank Daniel Tanner

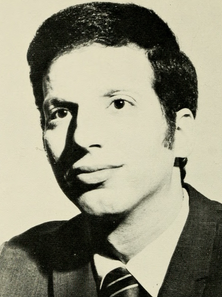
David Mofenson

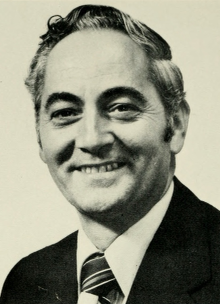
Edward LeLacheur

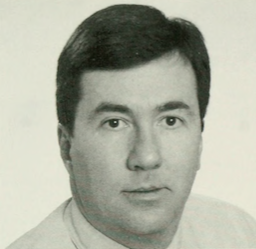
David Nangle

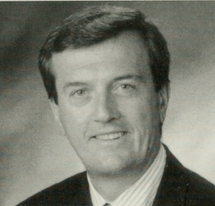
Kevin Murphy

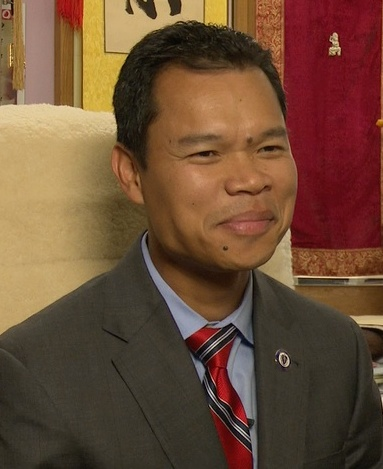
Rady Mom

== Current State Representative ==
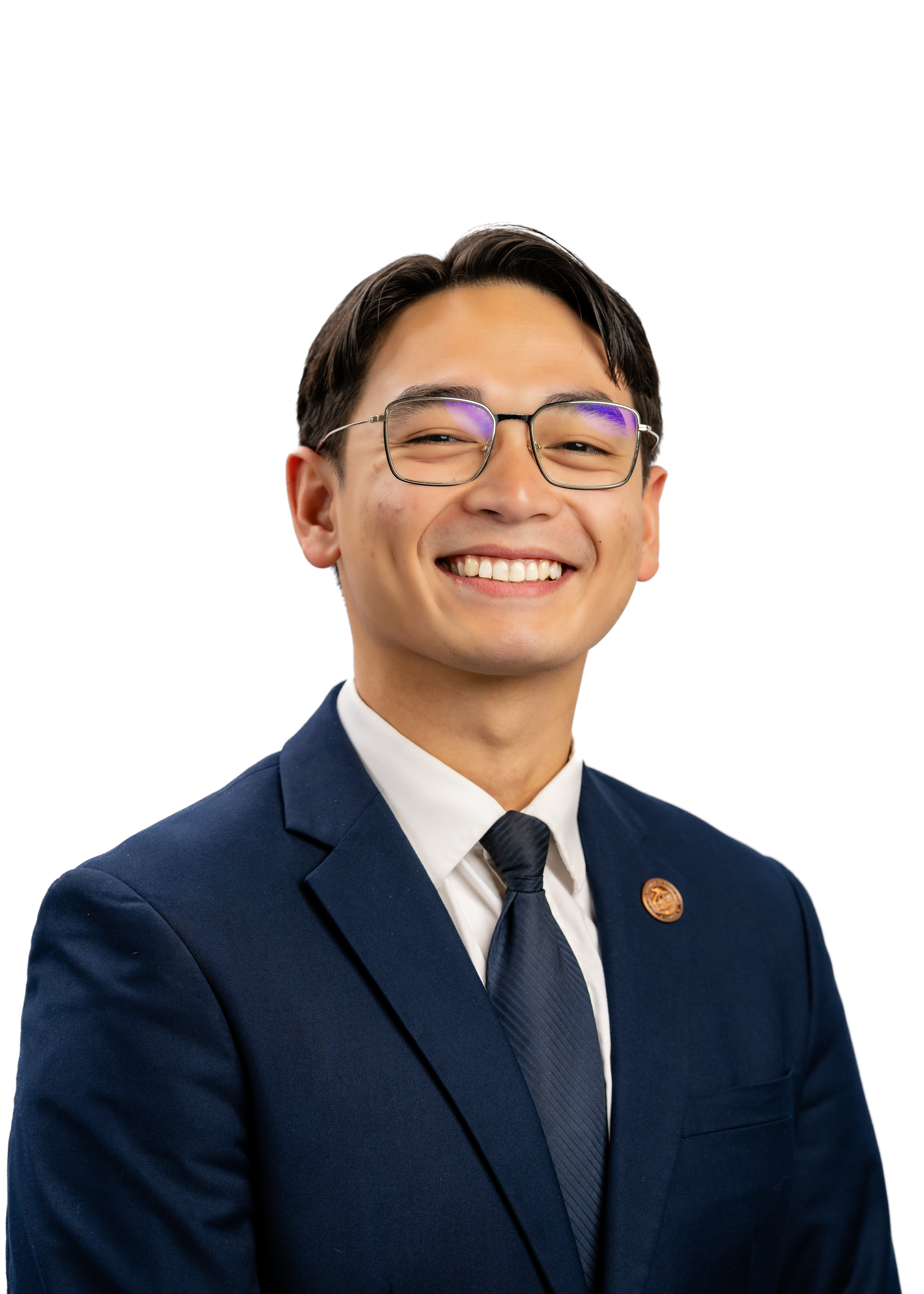
Tara Hong
