= Eileen Donoghue =

American politician

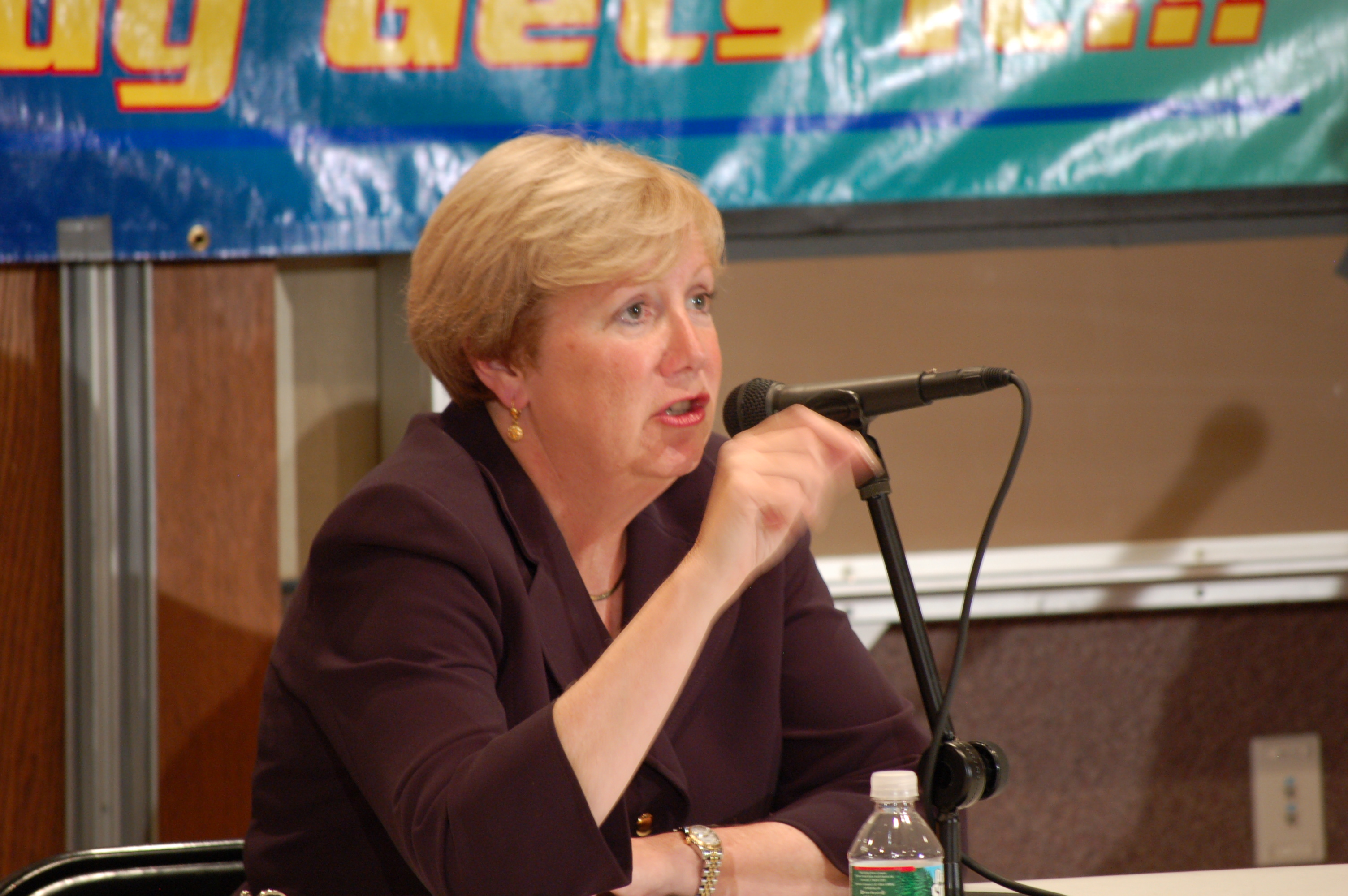

City Manager of Lowell, Massachusetts
- In office April 11, 2018 – April 11, 2022
- Preceded by: Kevin J. Murphy
- Succeeded by: Thomas Golden Jr.

Member of the Massachusetts Senate from the 1st Middlesex district
- In office January 5, 2011 – April 11, 2018
- Preceded by: Steven C. Panagiotakos
- Succeeded by: Edward J. Kennedy

Mayor of Lowell, Massachusetts
- In office 1998–2002
- Preceded by: Edward "Bud" Caulfield
- Succeeded by: Rita Mercier

Personal details
- Born: Holyoke, Massachusetts United States
- Party: Democratic
- Spouse: John O’Connor
- Education: University of Massachusetts Amherst, Suffolk University Law School

Eileen Donoghue (born 1954 in Holyoke, Massachusetts) is an American politician who is the former city manager of Lowell, Massachusetts (2018–2022), a former member of the Massachusetts Senate, where she has represented the First Middlesex District from 2011 to 2018, as well as a former city councilor (1996–2008) and mayor (1998–2002) of Lowell. She ran in the Massachusetts' 5th Congressional District special election in 2007 to fill the United States House of Representatives seat vacated by Marty Meehan, narrowly losing the Democratic primary to Niki Tsongas. In the Massachusetts Senate, Donoghue has been a staunch advocate for small businesses, economic development in gateway cities, and public higher education. She has spearheaded efforts to reduce student loan debt and create pathways to stable jobs.

== Early life and career ==
Donoghue grew up in Holyoke, Massachusetts, the third oldest in a working-class family of eight children. She attended college nearby at the University of Massachusetts Amherst, and also spent a semester at University of Puerto Rico in Rio Piedras, where she became fluent in Spanish. Donoghue graduated from UMass in 1976 with an individualized concentration in law and Spanish and went on to Suffolk University Law School, receiving her J.D. in 1979.

As a young lawyer, Donoghue served as an associate at Field and Schultz, working in the areas of civil litigation and real estate. In 1984 she was a founding partner of Donoghue and Grossman, also in Boston. She opened her own law practice in Lowell in 1991, and operated it until 2008, when she joined Gallagher & Cavanaugh.

In Lowell, Donoghue became heavily involved in the community, joining the boards of the Whistler House Museum of Art, Girls Incorporated of Greater Lowell, and the Merrimack River Valley House. Donoghue has said that civic engagement is part of Lowell's spirit. “The city kind of grabs you and pulls you in,” she told the Lowell Sun in 2007. “People in this city not only reached out to me and welcomed me, but they asked for and encouraged involvement.”

Donoghue helped found several nonprofit organizations in the late 1990s, including the Merrimack Valley Economic Development Council and the Future Stars Camp, which builds leadership skills and discourages young people from joining violent gangs. In 2004, Donoghue was a founder of the Women Working Wonders Fund, which invests in the education of women, develops women leaders, and assists women who are working to preserve the environment.

== Lowell City Council ==
Donoghue entered politics when her neighbor, former U.S. Senator and presidential candidate Paul Tsongas, approached her about running for Lowell City Council in 1995. She was successful in that race, and two years after joining the council she was selected by her peers to serve as mayor, a post she held from 1998 until 2002.

During her tenure as mayor, Donoghue championed historic economic development projects including the development of the Tsongas Arena and LeLacheur Park, the construction and renovation of 17 schools, and the creation of an overlay district that led to 800 artists’ lofts in formerly abandoned mill buildings. In 1999, during Donoghue's mayoralty, Lowell won an All-America City Award from the National Civic League. The award recognizes cities that come together to identify and address local issues.

== Massachusetts Senate ==
=== Elections ===
In March 2010, state Senator Steven Panagiotakos, then serving as chair of the Senate Committee on Ways and Means, announced that he would not seek re-election to the First Middlesex District seat. Donoghue entered the race to replace Panagiotakos shortly after his announcement.

In the Democratic primary Donoghue squared off against Chris Doherty, a former Middlesex County assistant district attorney. She won the endorsements of several local unions, NARAL Pro-Choice MA, Planned Parenthood, the Massachusetts League of Environmental Voters, and the Sierra Club and won the primary with more than 61 percent of the vote.

In the general election Donoghue defeated Republican candidate James Buba and independent Patrick O’Connor, winning more than 54 percent of the vote. In a 2012 rematch against Buba she was re-elected with more than 70 percent of the vote. Donoghue was re-elected in both 2014 and 2016, running unopposed in both years.

=== 2011–2012 General Court ===
In her first term, Donoghue served as Senate chair of the Joint Committee on Arts, Tourism, and Cultural Development. She brought the committee on a statewide listening tour that included a stop in Lowell, where she highlighted how the local cultural community had fueled the city's renaissance. During budget deliberations, Donoghue filed amendments increasing funding for the Massachusetts Cultural Council.

Donoghue supported municipal health care reform legislation that allowed cities and towns to move their workers’ health insurance into the state's Group Insurance Commission. After negotiating agreements with the 17 unions that represent municipal employees, Lowell shifted its workers into the GIC and saved $7 million as a result.

=== 2013-2014 General Court ===
Donoghue chaired the Subcommittee on Student Loans and Debt during her second term, traveling the state to hear testimony from students, graduates, and higher education experts. The subcommittee issued a report describing the scope and impact of the student debt crisis in Massachusetts. It also recommended a wide variety policies that would reduce the financial burdens placed on students and their families. Those policies include increasing funding for public colleges and universities, establishing tax incentives for college savings, building stronger pathways from community colleges to four-year universities, and expanding MASSGrant, the state's need-based financial aid program. Donoghue subsequently filed bills that would put the recommended policies in place.

Donoghue also filed legislation creating a commission to study the feasibility, costs, and benefits of hosting the 2024 summer Olympics in Greater Boston. Governor Deval Patrick signed the bill into law in October 2013, and Donoghue was appointed to the commission, which issued its findings the following February. The commission concluded that hosting the Olympics was feasible, provided that new construction fit into the region's planning needs in the areas of infrastructure, housing, and economic development.

After Boston won the U.S. Olympics bid, Donoghue highlighted the international event's potential impact on Lowell, which was named a potential location for events like rowing and boxing. She said she understood concerns about costs, but said that if the Games catalyzed improvements that had long-term benefits, then hosting the Olympics would be worthwhile. When Boston withdrew its bid, Donoghue said she was proud that the process had started important conversations about Massachusetts’ future. “The real value of a Boston Olympics was going to be the legacy it would leave behind,” she said at the time.” I’m excited to work for that legacy—with or without the Olympics.”

=== 2015–2016 General Court ===
Donoghue became Senate chair of the Joint Committee on Economic Development and Emerging Technologies during her third term. In that role she helped usher through a billion-dollar economic development bill that invested in infrastructure, job creation, workforce training, and housing. Donoghue and a colleague received praise for including an innovative approach to developing workforce housing in mid-sized cities.

The economic development legislation also incorporated a Donoghue bill creating a tax deduction for contributions to 529 college savings accounts. The tax deduction is intended to encourage more families to save for college. According to the Association of Independent Colleges and Universities of Massachusetts, Vermont introduced a similar tax incentive in 2006 and saw a 34 percent increase in the number of families opening savings accounts. AICUM honored Donoghue for her work to create the deduction at its annual dinner on December 5, 2016, with the organization's president noting that "Senator Donoghue’s leadership and dedication were critical components in the creation of this tax deduction for Massachusetts families saving for college."

== Lowell city manager ==
On March 27, 2018, the Lowell City Council unanimously selected Donoghue to succeed Kevin J. Murphy as city manager. She was the first woman appointed to that post. She was sworn in on April 11.

As City Manager, Donoghue prioritized economic development and improvements to the City’s infrastructure. She oversaw the completion of major projects in the City’s Hamilton Canal Innovation District, including the construction of a 900-space parking garage and the Niki Tsongas Bridge, both considered critical components in attracting private development to the 15-acre district. Donoghue also oversaw the Lord Overpass redesign, a $25 million project that replaced aging, heavily utilized infrastructure and created a safer gateway to the City’s downtown.

Along with the City’s department of Planning and Development, Donoghue actively pursued and obtained grant funding to advance key economic development, open space improvement, and housing projects in Lowell, including a $1.7 million MassWorks grant in 2021 to support a project aimed at creating affordable homeownership opportunities in the Acre neighborhood.

Donoghue led the City through two years of the COVID-19 crisis, working with state government and local partners to ensure the availability of testing, vaccination, and other resources for Lowell residents. Donoghue’s administration launched a host of innovative initiatives to provide relief to small businesses impacted by the pandemic, which resulted in the City losing no businesses as a direct result of COVID-19.

During Donoghue’s time as City Manager, the City of Lowell broke ground on the construction of a new Lowell High School. Initially estimated at $343 million, the 622,777 square foot project marked largest school building project in the state’s history at the time of its construction.

In the first year of her administration, Donoghue launched a Task Force on Homelessness and Sustainable Housing which has led to an enhanced degree of coordination among local service providers in responding to homelessness in the City.

In early 2022, Donoghue announced that she would leave the position of City Manager at the expiration of her contract in April 2022.
