= Massachusetts House of Representatives' 1st Middlesex district =

American legislative district

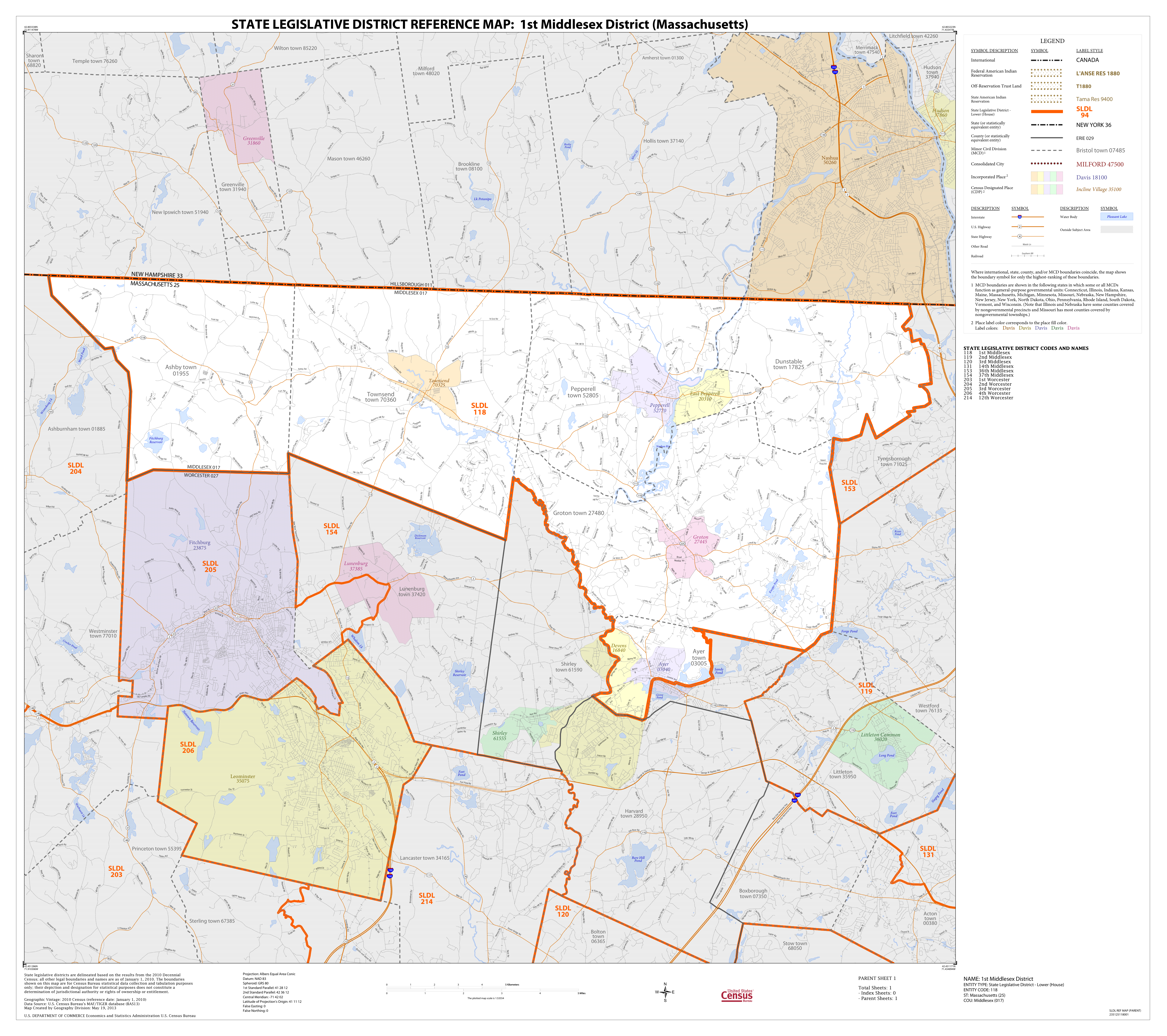
Map of Massachusetts House of Representatives' 1st Middlesex district, based on the 2010 United States census.

Massachusetts House of Representatives' 1st Middlesex district in the United States is one of 160 legislative districts included in the lower house of the Massachusetts General Court. It covers part of Middlesex County. Democrat Margaret Scarsdale of Pepperell has represented the district since 2023. Candidates for this district seat in the 2022 Massachusetts general election included Andrew Shepherd and Catherine Lundeen.

== Towns represented ==
The district includes the following localities:

- Ashby
- Dunstable
- Groton (Precincts 2 and 3)
- Lunenburg (Precincts A, B1, C, & D)
- Pepperell
- Townsend

The current district geographic boundary overlaps with those of the Massachusetts Senate's 1st Middlesex district and the Worcester and Middlesex district.

=== Former locale ===
The district previously covered part of Charlestown, circa 1872.

== Representatives ==
- Edward Lawrence, circa 1858–1859
- Joseph Caldwell, circa 1859
- John Read, circa 1888
- Chester F. Sanger, circa 1888
- Edward Sennott, circa 1908
- William Hogan, circa 1908
- Willis McMenimen, circa 1918
- James H. Kelleher, circa 1920
- Francis David Coady, circa 1935
- Thomas Dillon, circa 1935
- Thomas Francis Coady, circa 1945
- Thomas Francis Coady, Jr., circa 1951–1953
- John Joseph Toomey, circa 1951
- Michael Lombardi, circa 1967
- Michael James Lombardi, circa 1975
- Bruce Wetherbee, circa 1983
- Augusta Hornblower, 1984–1994
- Robert Hargraves, circa 1995
- Sheila C. Harrington, 2011–2022
- Margaret R. Scarsdale, 2023–Present

== See also ==
- List of Massachusetts House of Representatives elections
- Other Middlesex County districts of the Massachusetts House of Representatives: 2nd, 3rd, 4th, 5th, 6th, 7th, 8th, 9th, 10th, 11th, 12th, 13th, 14th, 15th, 16th, 17th, 18th, 19th, 20th, 21st, 22nd, 23rd, 24th, 25th, 26th, 27th, 28th, 29th, 30th, 31st, 32nd, 33rd, 34th, 35th, 36th, 37th
- List of Massachusetts General Courts
- List of former districts of the Massachusetts House of Representatives

== Images ==
Portraits of legislators

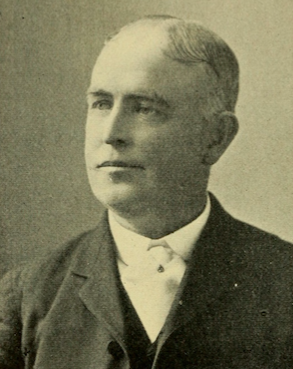
Edward Sennott

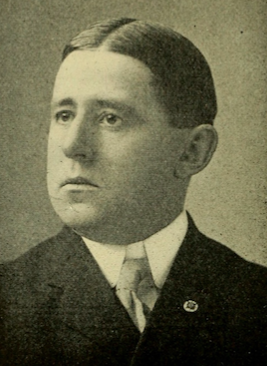
William Hogan

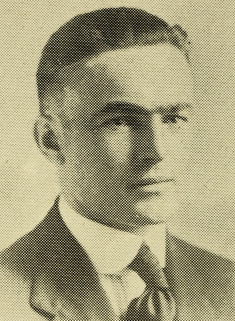
Willis McMenimen

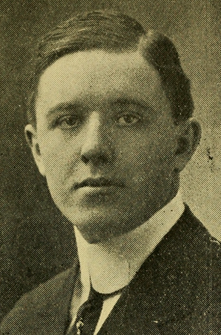
James Kelleher

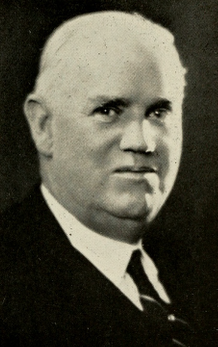
Francis David Coady

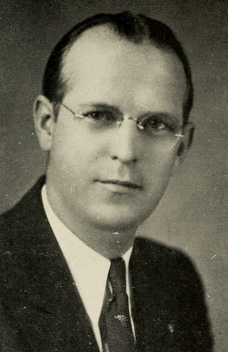
Thomas Dillon

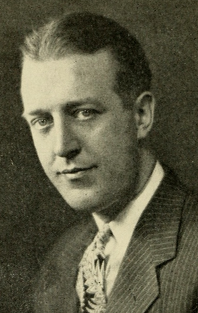
John Toomey

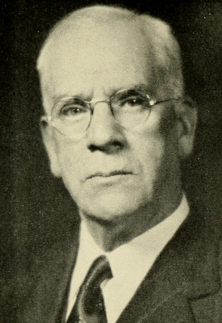
Thomas Francis Coady

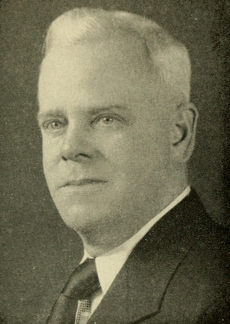
Thomas Francis Coady Jr.

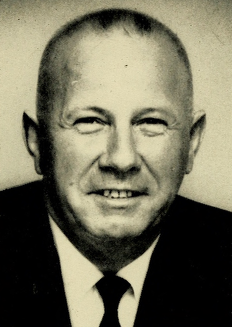
Michael Lombardi

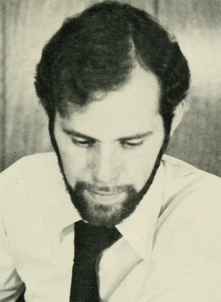
Bruce Wetherbee

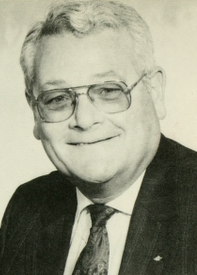
Robert Hargraves

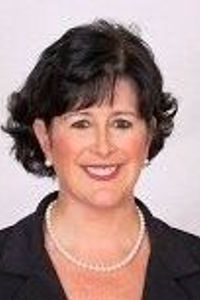
Sheila C. Harrington

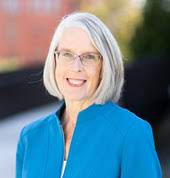
Margaret R. Scarsdale
