= Massachusetts House of Representatives' 37th Middlesex district =

American legislative district

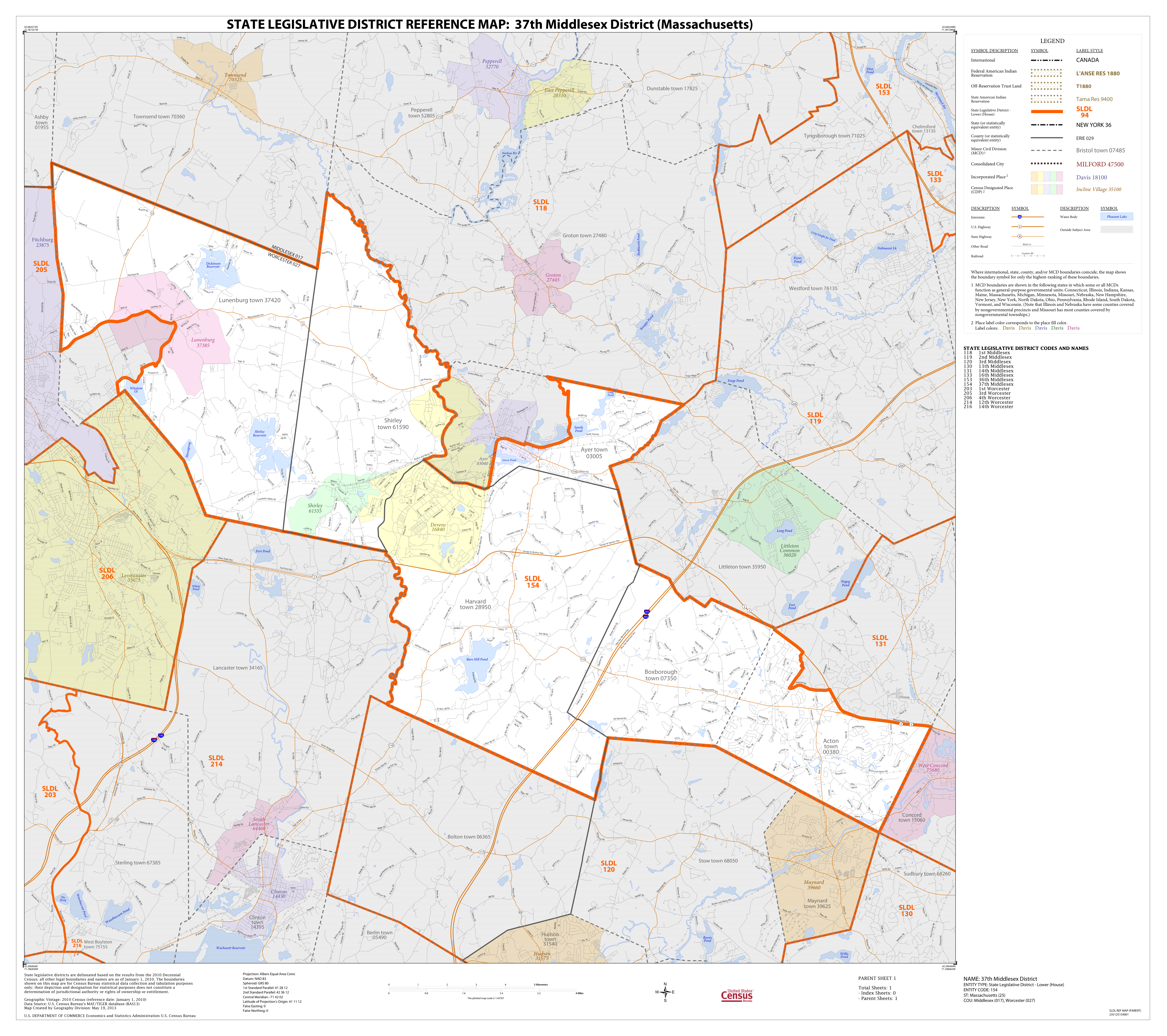
Map of Massachusetts House of Representatives' 37th Middlesex district, based on the 2010 United States census.

Massachusetts House of Representatives' 37th Middlesex district in the United States is one of 160 legislative districts included in the lower house of the Massachusetts General Court. It covers parts of Middlesex County and Worcester County. Democrat Danillo Sena has represented the district since June 2020. Sena is running for re-election in the 2020 Massachusetts general election.

== Locales represented ==
- part of Acton
- part of Ayer
- Boxborough
- Harvard
- part of Lunenburg
- Shirley

The current district geographic boundary overlaps with those of the Massachusetts Senate's Middlesex and Worcester district and Worcester and Middlesex district.

== Representatives ==
- Carol C. Amick, 1975–1977
- Michael McGlynn
- Vincent Ciampa
- James B. Eldridge 2003–2009
- Jennifer E. Benson, 2009–2020.
- Danillo Sena, 2020–current

== See also ==
- List of Massachusetts House of Representatives elections
- List of Massachusetts General Courts
- List of former districts of the Massachusetts House of Representatives
- Other Middlesex County districts of the Massachusetts House of Representatives: 1st, 2nd, 3rd, 4th, 5th, 6th, 7th, 8th, 9th, 10th, 11th, 12th, 13th, 14th, 15th, 16th, 17th, 18th, 19th, 20th, 21st, 22nd, 23rd, 24th, 25th, 26th, 27th, 28th, 29th, 30th, 31st, 32nd, 33rd, 34th, 35th, 36th

== Images ==
Portraits of legislators

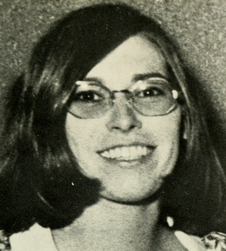
Carol Amick

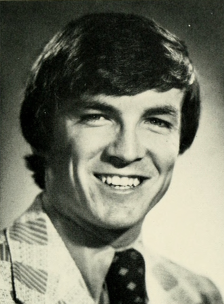
Michael McGlynn

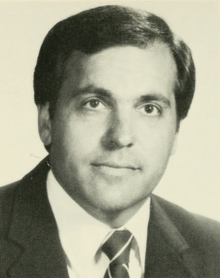
Vincent Ciampa

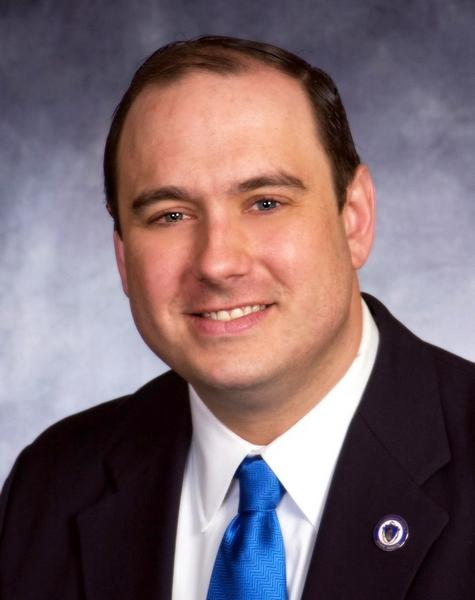
James Eldridge
