= Massachusetts House of Representatives' 20th Middlesex district =

American legislative district

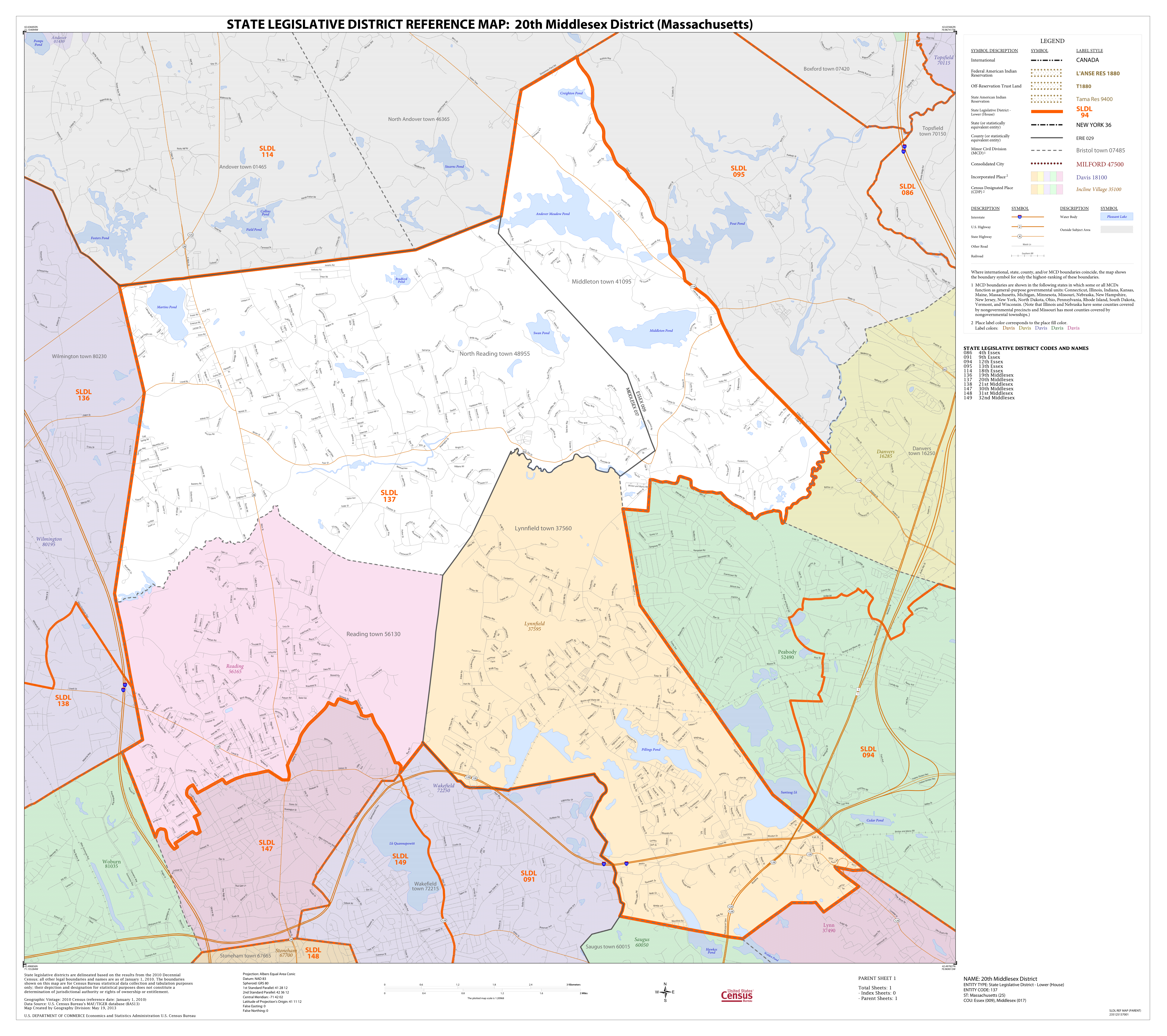
Map of Massachusetts House of Representatives' 20th Middlesex district, based on the 2010 United States census.

Massachusetts House of Representatives' 20th Middlesex district in the United States is one of 160 legislative districts included in the lower house of the Massachusetts General Court. It covers parts of Essex County and Middlesex County. Republican Brad Jones of North Reading has represented the district since 2003.

== Towns represented ==
The district includes the following localities:

- Lynnfield
- part of Middleton
- North Reading
- part of Reading

The current district geographic boundary overlaps with those of the Massachusetts Senate's 1st Essex and Middlesex district, 3rd Essex district, and 5th Middlesex district.

=== Former locales ===
The district previously covered:

- Concord, circa 1872
- Lincoln, circa 1872
- Weston, circa 1872

== Representatives ==
- John Sullivan Eaton, circa 1858
- Walter Littlefield, Jr., circa 1858
- Loren L. Fuller, circa 1859
- J. Parker Gould, circa 1859
- George W. Trull, circa 1888
- Joseph L. Larson, circa 1920
- Willard P. Lombard, circa 1920
- Francis Thomas Gallagher, circa 1951
- Fred C. Harrington, circa 1951
- George Keverian, circa 1967
- Frederick N. Dello Russo, circa 1975
- Bradley H. Jones, Jr., 2003–current

== See also ==
- List of Massachusetts House of Representatives elections
- List of Massachusetts General Courts
- List of former districts of the Massachusetts House of Representatives
- Other Middlesex County districts of the Massachusetts House of Representatives: 1st, 2nd, 3rd, 4th, 5th, 6th, 7th, 8th, 9th, 10th, 11th, 12th, 13th, 14th, 15th, 16th, 17th, 18th, 19th, 21st, 22nd, 23rd, 24th, 25th, 26th, 27th, 28th, 29th, 30th, 31st, 32nd, 33rd, 34th, 35th, 36th, 37th

== Images ==
Portraits of legislators

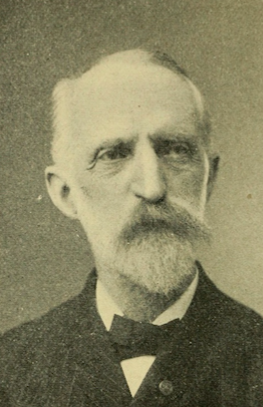
Andrew Linscott

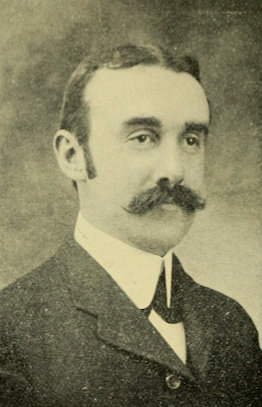
James Killam

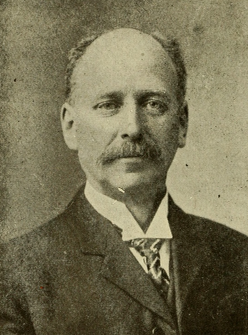
Fred Greenwood

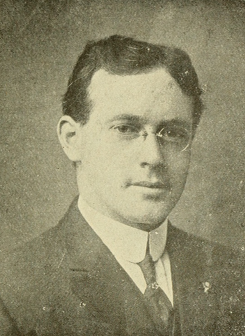
Howard Furness

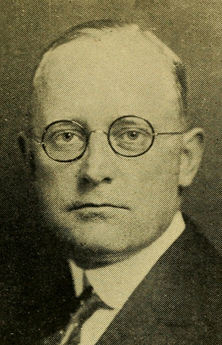
James Brown

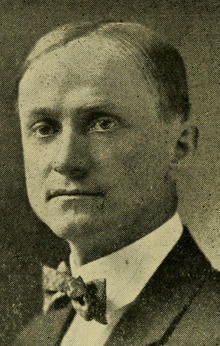
Joseph Larson

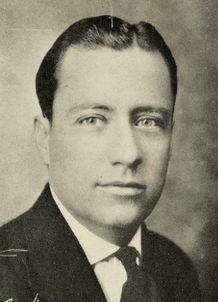
Albert Morris

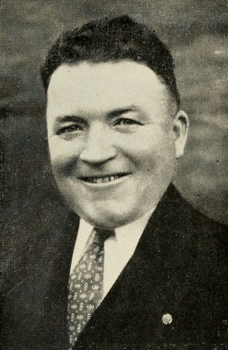
George Pierce

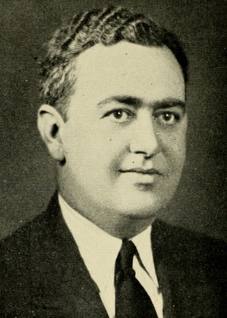
Fred Harrington

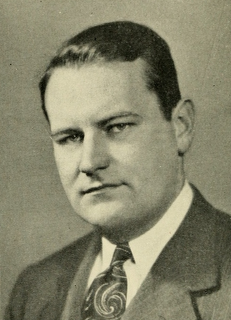
Lawrence Davis

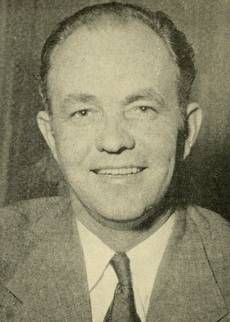
William Joseph Brickley

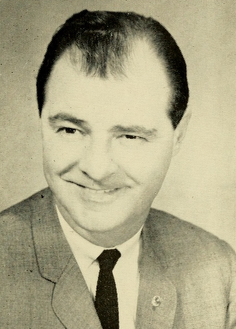
William Hogan

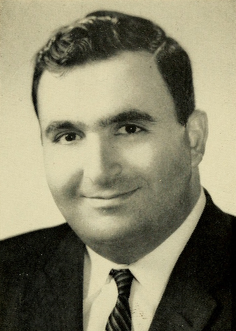
George Keverian

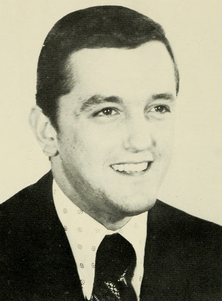
Frederick Dello Russo

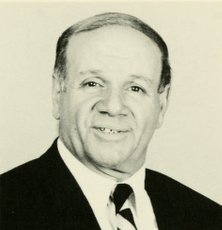
James Miceli

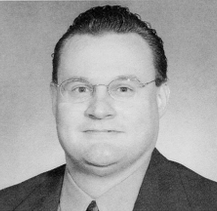
Bradley Jones
