= Massachusetts House of Representatives' 8th Middlesex district =

American legislative district

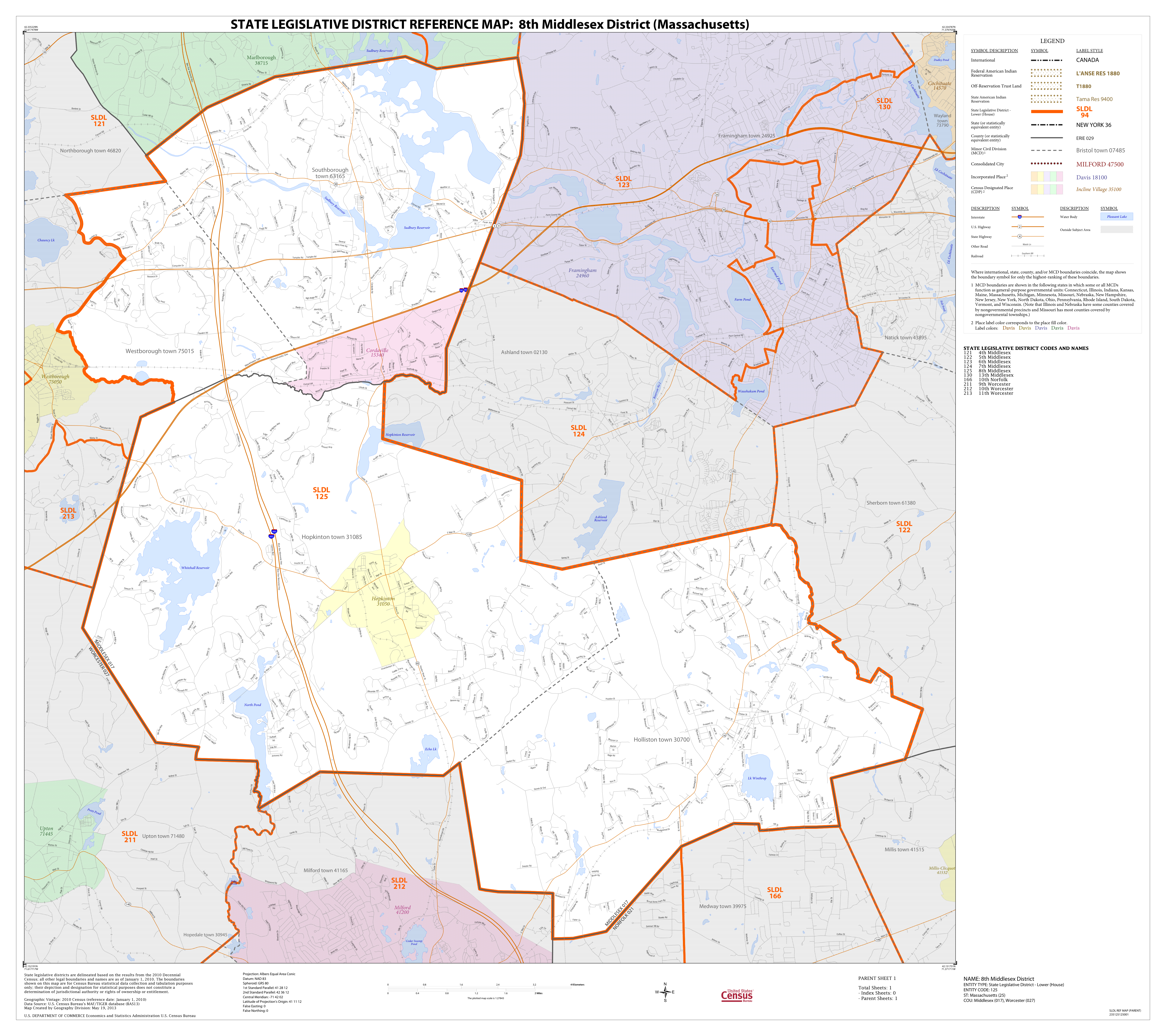
Map of Massachusetts House of Representatives' 8th Middlesex district, based on the 2010 United States census.

Massachusetts House of Representatives' 8th Middlesex district in the United States is one of 160 legislative districts included in the lower house of the Massachusetts General Court. It covers parts of Middlesex County and Worcester County. The district has been represented by Democrat James Arena-DeRosa since 2022.

== Towns represented ==
This district boundary overlaps those of the Massachusetts Senate's 2nd Middlesex and Norfolk district and its Middlesex and Worcester district.

The new boundaries, drawn from 2020 census data, include:

- Holliston
- Hopkinton
- Sherborn
- part of Millis

=== Former locale ===
The district previously covered part of Cambridge, circa 1872.

After the 2010 census the district contained the following localities:

- Holliston
- Hopkinton
- Southborough
- one precinct of Westborough

== Representatives ==
- Sedgwick L. Plumer, circa 1858
- Edward J. Collins, circa 1858–1859
- Thomas Rice, Jr, circa 1859
- Theodore P. Dresser, circa 1888
- James F. Leland, circa 1920
- James Alan Hodder, circa 1951
- William I. Randall, circa 1951
- Mary Fantasia, circa 1975
- Andrew Natsios, 1975–1987
- Barbara A. Gardner, 1987–2001
- Paul Loscocco, 2001–2009
- Carolyn Dykema, 2009–2022
- James Arena-DeRosa, 2022–present

== See also ==
- List of Massachusetts House of Representatives elections
- List of Massachusetts General Courts
- List of former districts of the Massachusetts House of Representatives
- Other Middlesex County districts of the Massachusetts House of Representatives: 1st, 2nd, 3rd, 4th, 5th, 6th, 7th, 9th, 10th, 11th, 12th, 13th, 14th, 15th, 16th, 17th, 18th, 19th, 20th, 21st, 22nd, 23rd, 24th, 25th, 26th, 27th, 28th, 29th, 30th, 31st, 32nd, 33rd, 34th, 35th, 36th, 37th

== Images ==
Portraits of legislators

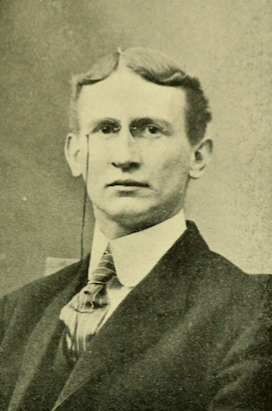
Charles Flagg

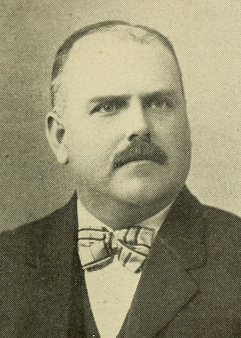
Wilbur Wood

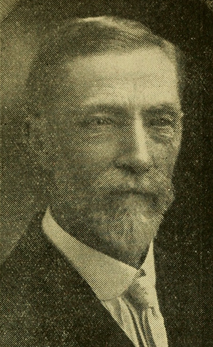
James Stewart

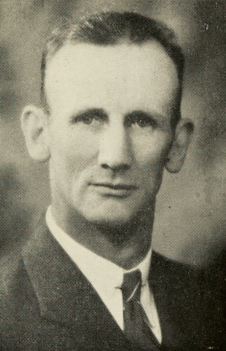
Charles Olson

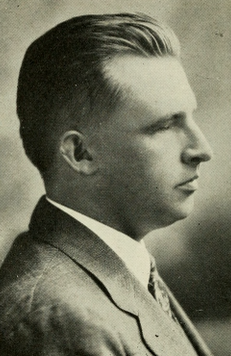
Joseph Tuttle

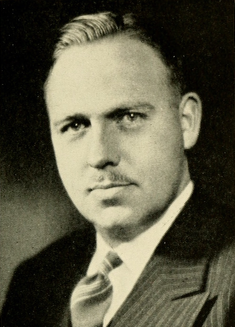
Carl Sheridan

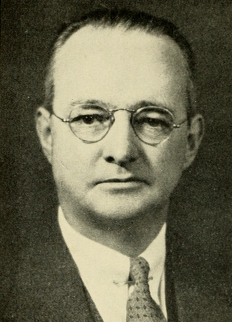
Clarence Wood

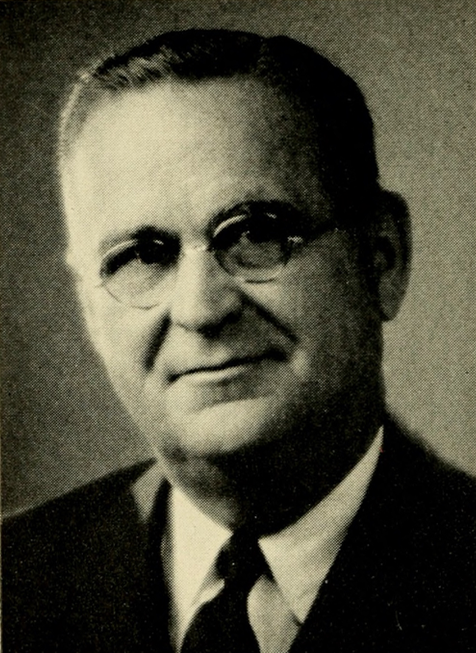
James Alan Hodder

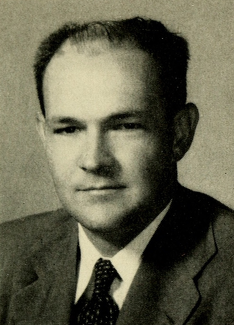
William Randall

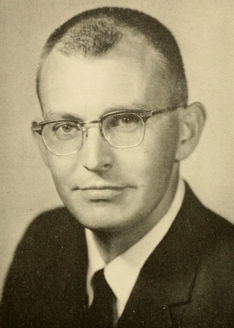
Elbert Tuttle

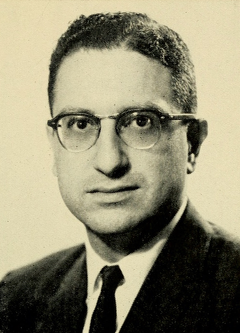
Robert Belmonte

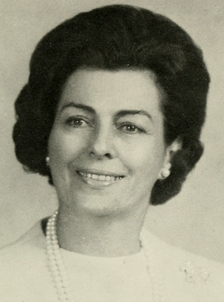
Mary Fantasia

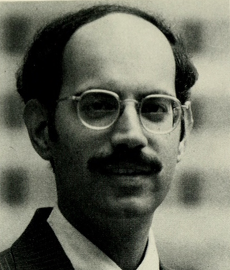
Andrew Natsios

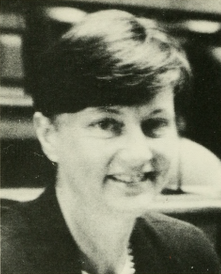
Barbara Gardner

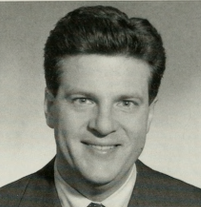
Paul Loscocco
