= Massachusetts House of Representatives' 19th Middlesex district =

American legislative district

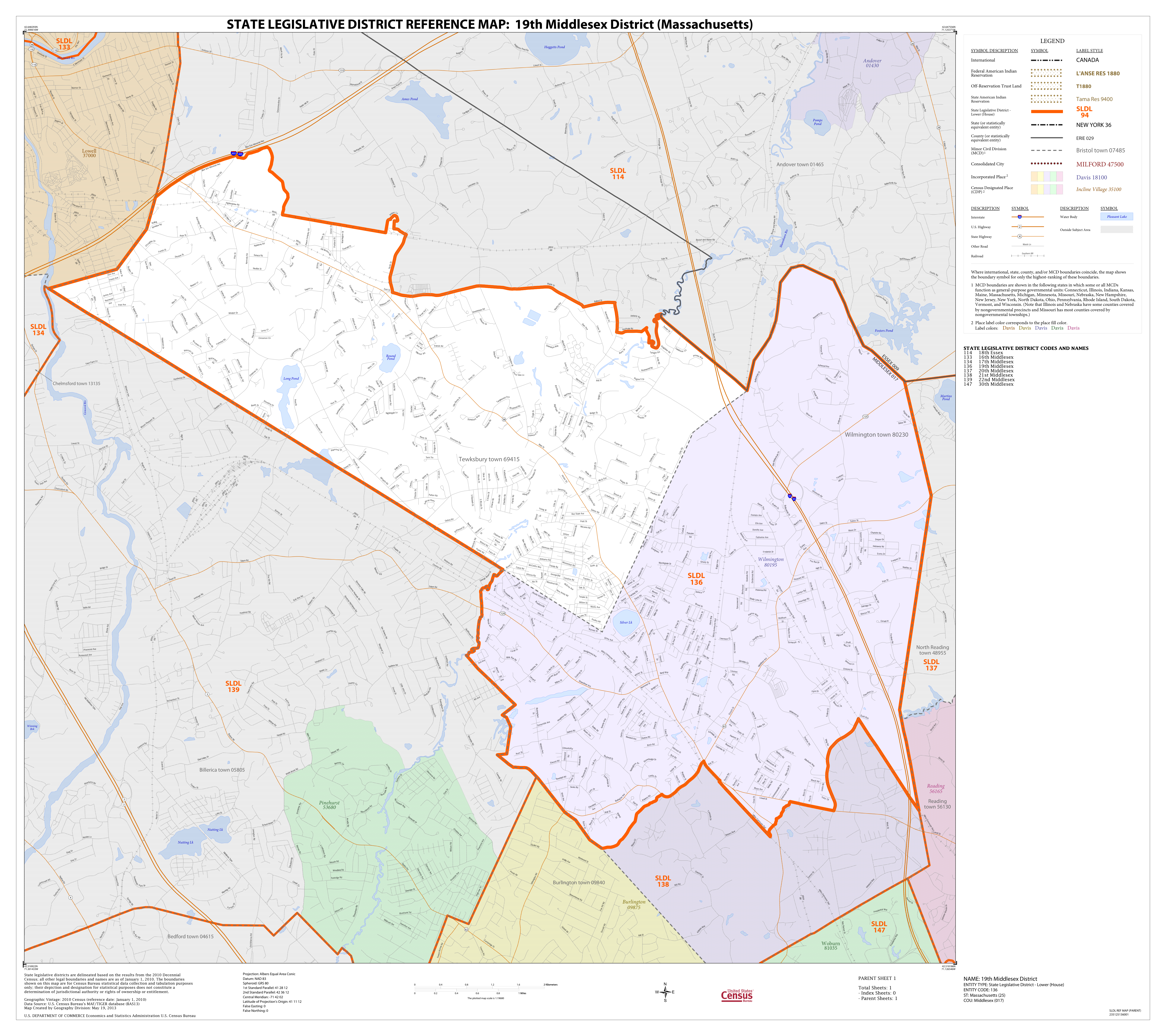
Map of Massachusetts House of Representatives' 19th Middlesex district, based on the 2010 United States census.

Massachusetts House of Representatives' 19th Middlesex district in the United States is one of 160 legislative districts included in the lower house of the Massachusetts General Court. It covers part of Middlesex County. Democrat Dave Robertson of Tewksbury has represented the district since 2019.

== Towns represented ==
The district includes the following localities:

- part of Tewksbury
- part of Wilmington

The current district geographic boundary overlaps with those of the Massachusetts Senate's 1st Essex and Middlesex district and 2nd Essex and Middlesex district.

=== Former locales ===
The district previously covered:

- Acton, circa 1872
- Sudbury, circa 1872
- Wayland, circa 1872

== Representatives ==
- Charles S. Converse, circa 1858
- Nathan Wyman, circa 1859
- E. H. Blake, circa 1888
- Eden K. Bowser, circa 1920
- John Brox, circa 1951
- Charles E. Ferguson, circa 1951
- Lois G. Pines, circa 1975
- James R. Miceli, 1977–2018
- David Allen Robertson, 2019–current

== See also ==
- List of Massachusetts House of Representatives elections
- List of Massachusetts General Courts
- List of former districts of the Massachusetts House of Representatives
- Other Middlesex County districts of the Massachusetts House of Representatives: 1st, 2nd, 3rd, 4th, 5th, 6th, 7th, 8th, 9th, 10th, 11th, 12th, 13th, 14th, 15th, 16th, 17th, 18th, 20th, 21st, 22nd, 23rd, 24th, 25th, 26th, 27th, 28th, 29th, 30th, 31st, 32nd, 33rd, 34th, 35th, 36th, 37th

== Images ==
Portraits of legislators

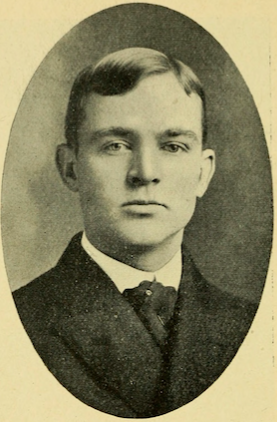
J.B. Albert Johnson

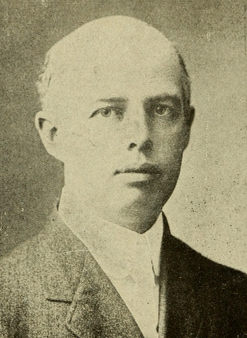
Eden Bowser

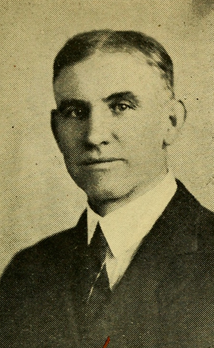
Maynard Clemons

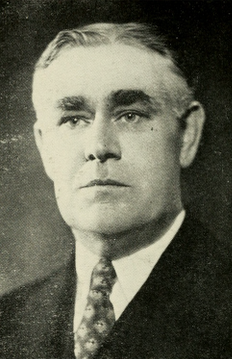
Edward Connelly

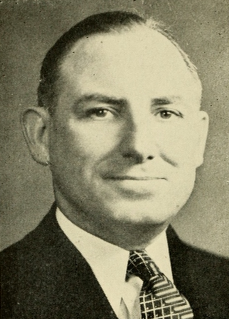
Harold Tivey

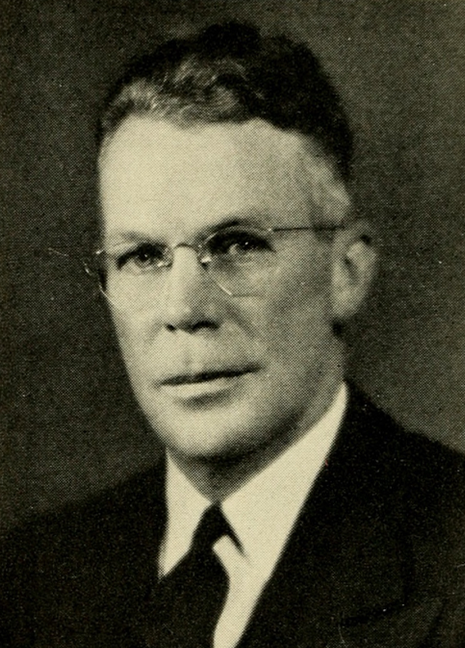
Charles Ferguson

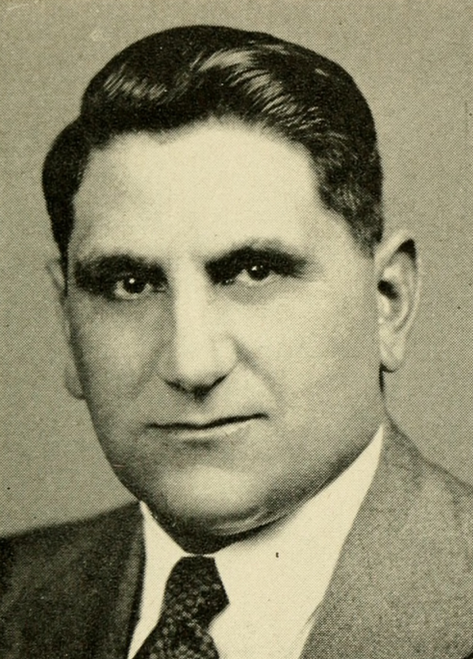
John Brox

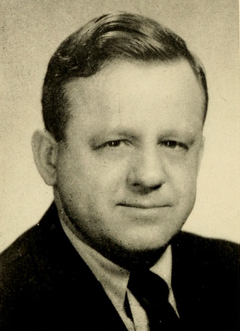
Stanley Bocko

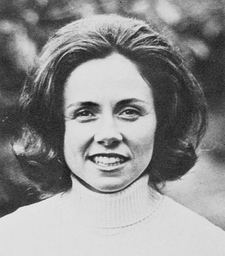
Lois Pines

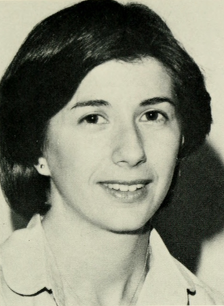
Susan N. Rourke

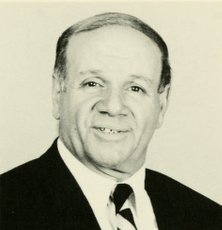
James Miceli

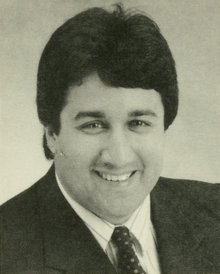
Steven Panagiotakos
