= Massachusetts House of Representatives' 27th Middlesex district =

American legislative district

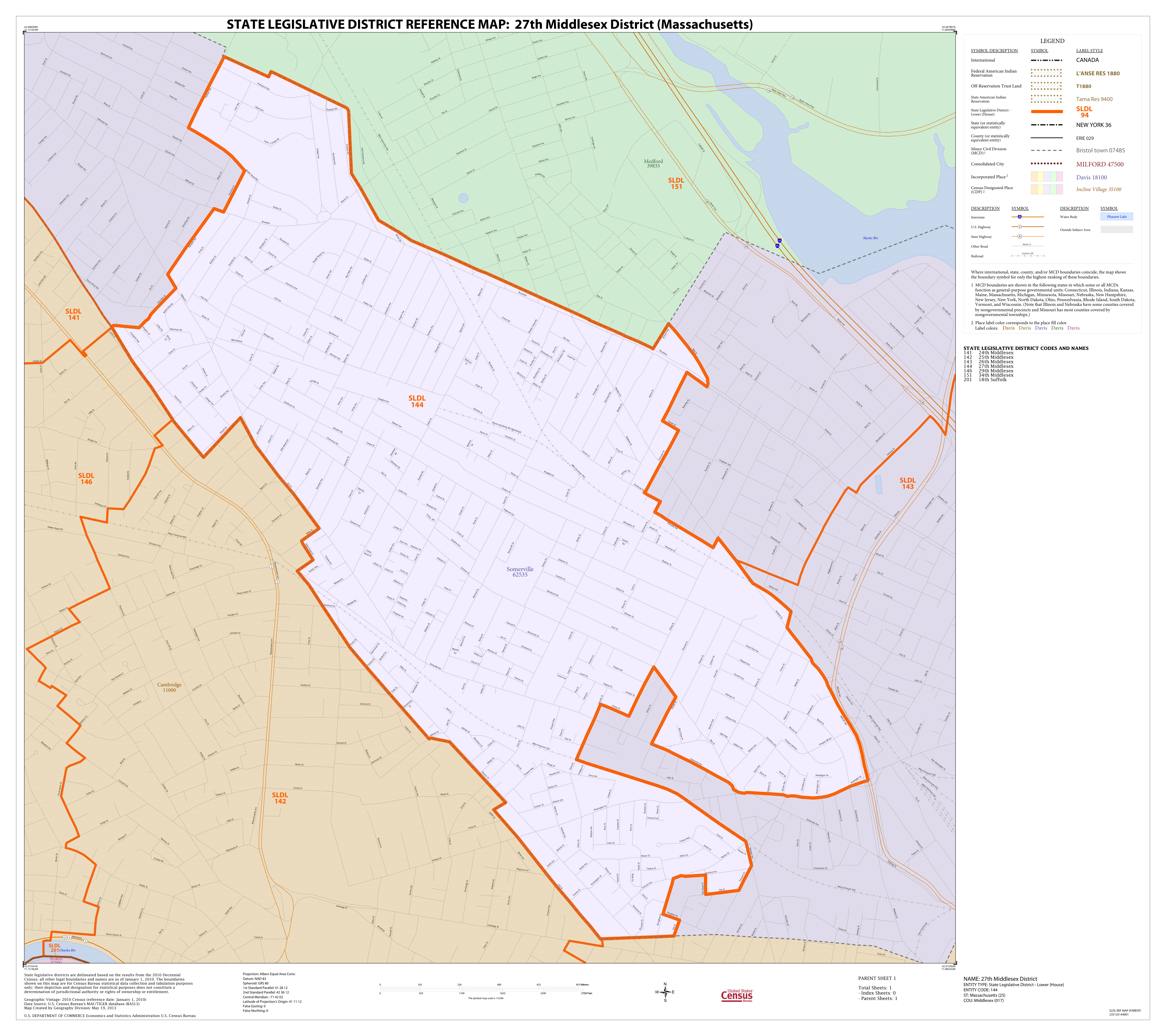
Map of Massachusetts House of Representatives' 27th Middlesex district, based on the 2010 United States census.

Massachusetts House of Representatives' 27th Middlesex district in the United States is one of 160 legislative districts included in the lower house of the Massachusetts General Court. It covers part of the city of Somerville in Middlesex County. Democrat Erika Uyterhoeven is the current representative.

The current district geographic boundary overlaps with that of the Massachusetts Senate's 2nd Middlesex district.

== Representatives ==
- Cyrus A. Davis, circa 1858
- Noah Ball, circa 1859
- Dennis J. O'Brien, circa 1888
- Lewis Parkhurst, circa 1908
- Winfield F. Prime, 1913–1914
- Jacob Bitzer, 1915–1919
- Charles C. Warren, circa 1920
- Bert Currier, circa 1923
- Owen McLellan, circa 1935
- Michael Francis Skerry, circa 1951
- Paul Cavanaugh, circa 1967
- Sherman W. Saltmarsh, Jr., circa 1975
- Charles Flaherty, circa 1983
- Patricia D. Jehlen
- Denise Provost, 2007–2021
- Erika Uyterhoeven, 2021–present

== Former locale ==
The district previously covered:

- part of Lowell, circa 1872

== See also ==
- List of Massachusetts House of Representatives elections
- List of Massachusetts General Courts
- List of former districts of the Massachusetts House of Representatives
- Other Middlesex County districts of the Massachusetts House of Representatives: 1st, 2nd, 3rd, 4th, 5th, 6th, 7th, 8th, 9th, 10th, 11th, 12th, 13th, 14th, 15th, 16th, 17th, 18th, 19th, 20th, 21st, 22nd, 23rd, 24th, 25th, 26th, 28th, 29th, 30th, 31st, 32nd, 33rd, 34th, 35th, 36th, 37th

== Images ==
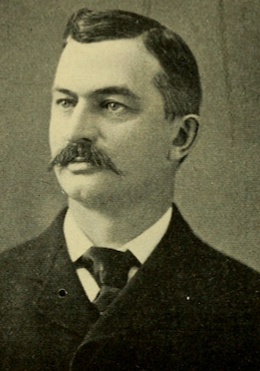
Lewis Parkhurst

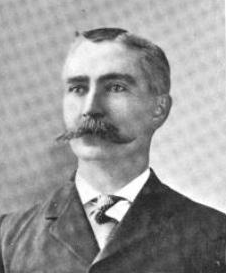
Winfield F. Prime, in office 1913-1914 (photo circa 1901)

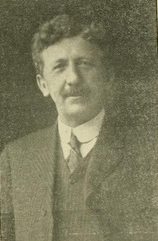
Jacob Bitzer, in office 1915-1919

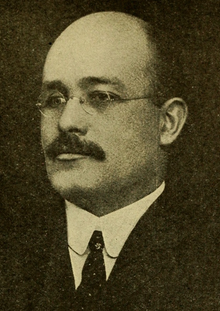
Bert Currier

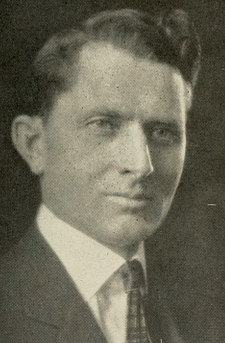
Owen McLellan

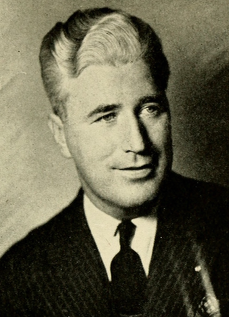
Michael Skerry

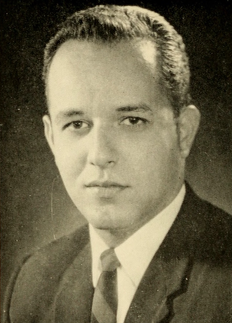
Paul Cavanaugh

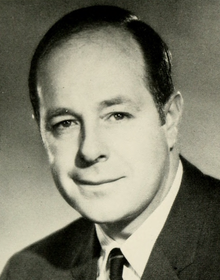
Sherman Saltmarsh

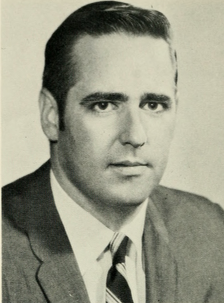
Charles Flaherty

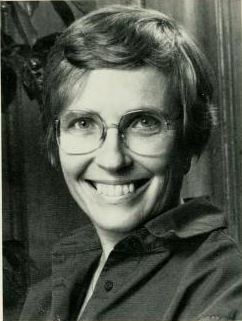
Patricia Jehlen, in office 2003–2005 (photo 1991)

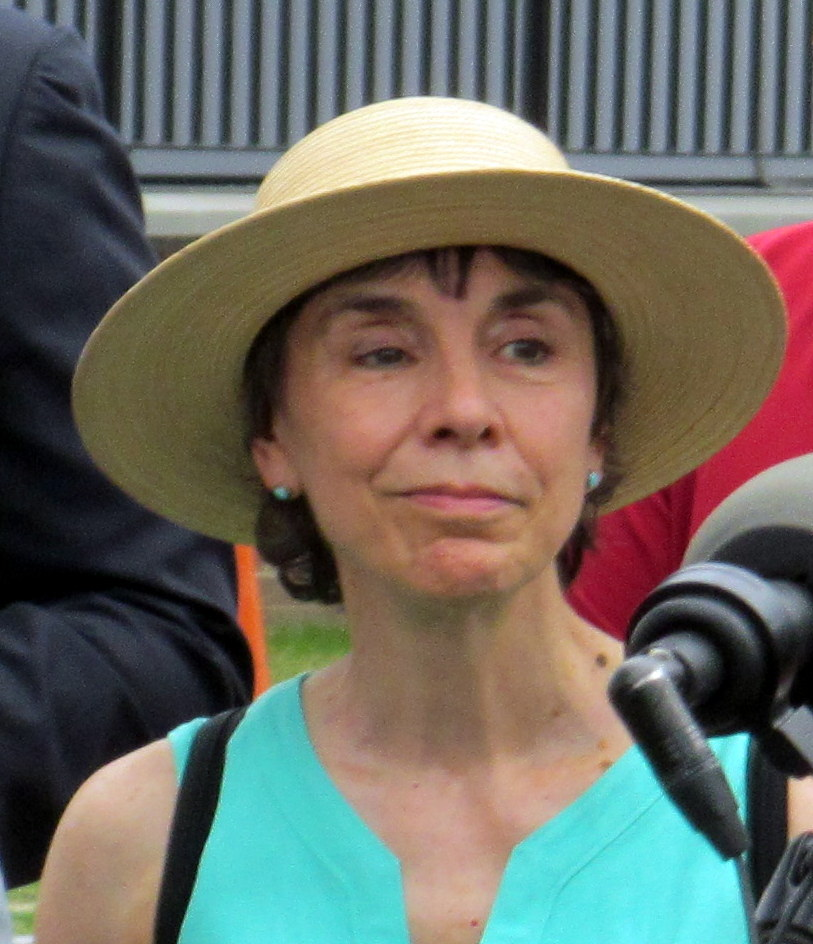
Denise Provost
