= Massachusetts House of Representatives' 17th Middlesex district =

American legislative district

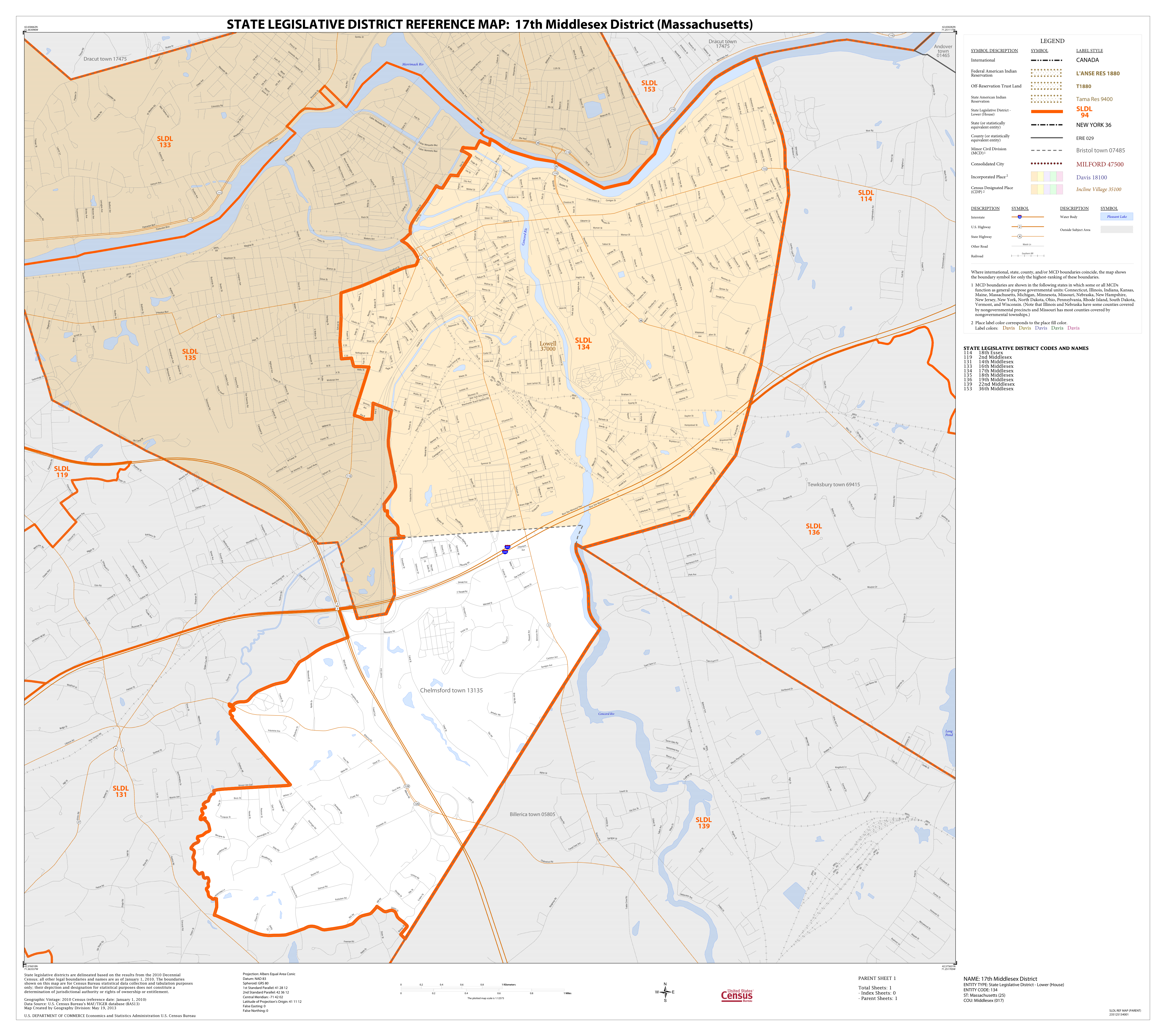
Map of Massachusetts House of Representatives' 17th Middlesex district, based on the 2010 United States census.

Massachusetts House of Representatives' 17th Middlesex district in the United States is one of 160 legislative districts included in the lower house of the Massachusetts General Court. It covers part of Middlesex County. Democrat Vanna Howard was elected to the position on November 3, 2020.

== District profile ==
As of the last redistricting in 2011, the district encompasses the southeastern portion of the city of Lowell and the northeastern portion of the town of Chelmsford. It has maintained these boundaries since the 2001 redistricting.

- Chelmsford's Precinct 4
- Lowell's Ward 1; Precinct 3 of Ward 2; Precincts 2 and 3 of Ward 4; Ward 10; and Ward 11

The current district geographic boundary overlaps with those of the Massachusetts Senate's 1st Middlesex and 3rd Middlesex districts.

=== Former locations ===
- c. 1872: Marlborough

== List of members representing the district ==
- Daniel Wetherbee, circa 1858
- Shattuck Hartwell, circa 1859
- Winfield S. Slocum, circa 1888
- Arthur C. Walworth, circa 1888
- Maurice Allan Buck, circa 1920
- Thomas M. Flaherty, circa 1951

General Court	Representative	Party	Term	District location
169th	Peter Harrington	Democratic	January 1, 1975 – January 3, 1979	Newton's Ward 1; Precincts 1, 2, and 3 of Ward 2; Precinct 2 of Ward 7
170th	Peter Harrington	Democratic	January 1, 1975 – January 3, 1979	Newton's Ward 1; Precincts 1, 2, and 3 of Ward 2; Precinct 2 of Ward 7
171st	Nick Lambros	Democratic	January 3, 1979 – January 5, 1983	Dracut; Lowell's Ward 5; Precincts 2 and 4 of Ward 6; and Ward 9
172nd	Nick Lambros	Democratic	January 3, 1979 – January 5, 1983	Dracut; Lowell's Ward 5; Precincts 2 and 4 of Ward 6; and Ward 9
173rd	John Cox	Democratic	January 5, 1983 – January 4, 1989	Dracut; Lowell's Ward 5; Precincts 2 and 4 of Ward 6; and Ward 9
174th	John Cox	Democratic	January 5, 1983 – January 4, 1989	Dracut; Lowell's Ward 5; Precincts 2 and 4 of Ward 6; and Ward 9
175th	John Cox	Democratic	January 5, 1983 – January 4, 1989	Dracut; Lowell's Ward 5; Precincts 2 and 4 of Ward 6; and Ward 9
176th	John Cox	Democratic	January 4, 1989 – 1995	Dracut; Lowell's Precincts 2 and 3 of Ward 5; and Ward 9
177th	John Cox	Democratic	January 4, 1989 – 1995	Dracut; Lowell's Precincts 2 and 3 of Ward 5; and Ward 9
178th	John Cox	Democratic	January 4, 1989 – 1995	Dracut; Lowell's Precincts 2 and 3 of Ward 5; and Ward 9
179th	Tom Golden	Democratic	January 4, 1995 – January 1, 2003	Lowell's Precinct 1 of Ward 1; Precinct 3 of Ward 2; Ward 5; Ward 6; Ward 9; and Precinct 3 of Ward 10
180th	Tom Golden	Democratic	January 4, 1995 – January 1, 2003	Lowell's Precinct 1 of Ward 1; Precinct 3 of Ward 2; Ward 5; Ward 6; Ward 9; and Precinct 3 of Ward 10
181st	Tom Golden	Democratic	January 4, 1995 – January 1, 2003	Lowell's Precinct 1 of Ward 1; Precinct 3 of Ward 2; Ward 5; Ward 6; Ward 9; and Precinct 3 of Ward 10
182nd	Tom Golden	Democratic	January 4, 1995 – January 1, 2003	Lowell's Precinct 1 of Ward 1; Precinct 3 of Ward 2; Ward 5; Ward 6; Ward 9; and Precinct 3 of Ward 10
183rd	David Nangle	Democratic	January 1, 2003 – January 6, 2021	Chelmsford's Precinct 4 Lowell's Ward 1; Precinct 3 of Ward 2; Precincts 2 and 3 of Ward 4; Ward 10; and Ward 11
184th	David Nangle	Democratic	January 1, 2003 – January 6, 2021	Chelmsford's Precinct 4 Lowell's Ward 1; Precinct 3 of Ward 2; Precincts 2 and 3 of Ward 4; Ward 10; and Ward 11
185th	David Nangle	Democratic	January 1, 2003 – January 6, 2021	Chelmsford's Precinct 4 Lowell's Ward 1; Precinct 3 of Ward 2; Precincts 2 and 3 of Ward 4; Ward 10; and Ward 11
186th	David Nangle	Democratic	January 1, 2003 – January 6, 2021	Chelmsford's Precinct 4 Lowell's Ward 1; Precinct 3 of Ward 2; Precincts 2 and 3 of Ward 4; Ward 10; and Ward 11
187th	David Nangle	Democratic	January 1, 2003 – January 6, 2021	Chelmsford's Precinct 4 Lowell's Ward 1; Precinct 3 of Ward 2; Precincts 2 and 3 of Ward 4; Ward 10; and Ward 11
188th	David Nangle	Democratic	January 1, 2003 – January 6, 2021	Chelmsford's Precinct 4 Lowell's Ward 1; Precinct 3 of Ward 2; Precincts 2 and 3 of Ward 4; Ward 10; and Ward 11
189th	David Nangle	Democratic	January 1, 2003 – January 6, 2021	Chelmsford's Precinct 4 Lowell's Ward 1; Precinct 3 of Ward 2; Precincts 2 and 3 of Ward 4; Ward 10; and Ward 11
190th	David Nangle	Democratic	January 1, 2003 – January 6, 2021	Chelmsford's Precinct 4 Lowell's Ward 1; Precinct 3 of Ward 2; Precincts 2 and 3 of Ward 4; Ward 10; and Ward 11
191st	David Nangle	Democratic	January 1, 2003 – January 6, 2021	Chelmsford's Precinct 4 Lowell's Ward 1; Precinct 3 of Ward 2; Precincts 2 and 3 of Ward 4; Ward 10; and Ward 11
192nd	Vanna Howard	Democratic	January 6, 2021 – Present	Chelmsford: Precinct 4; Lowell: Ward 1, Ward 2: Precinct 3, Ward 4: Precincts 2, 3, Wards 10, 11
193rd	Vanna Howard	Democratic	2023 – Present	

== See also ==
- List of Massachusetts House of Representatives elections
- List of Massachusetts General Courts
- List of former districts of the Massachusetts House of Representatives
- Other Middlesex County districts of the Massachusetts House of Representatives: 1st, 2nd, 3rd, 4th, 5th, 6th, 7th, 8th, 9th, 10th, 11th, 12th, 13th, 14th, 15th, 16th, 18th, 19th, 20th, 21st, 22nd, 23rd, 24th, 25th, 26th, 27th, 28th, 29th, 30th, 31st, 32nd, 33rd, 34th, 35th, 36th, 37th

== Images ==
Portraits of legislators

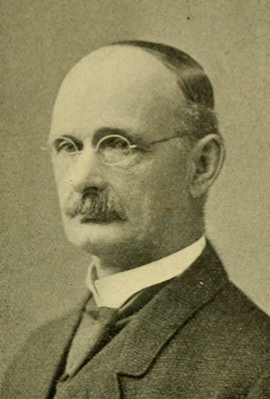
Charles Varnum

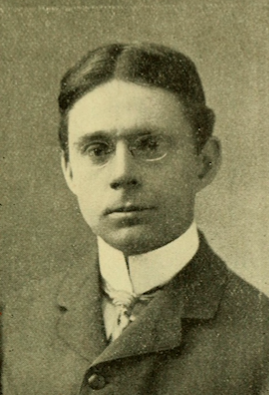
James O'Donnell

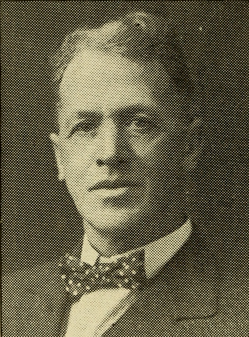
Harry Shedd

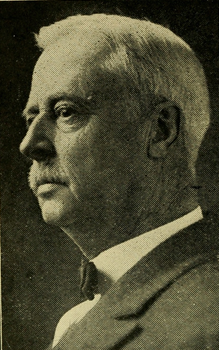
Edward Nelson Eames

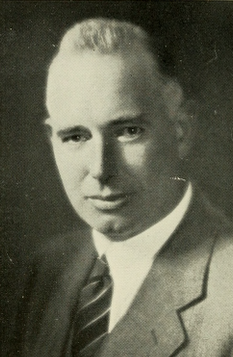
Ralph Currier

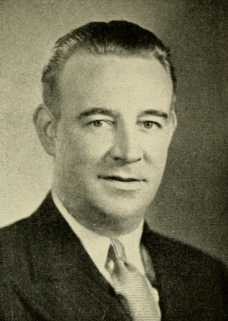
Daniel Sullivan

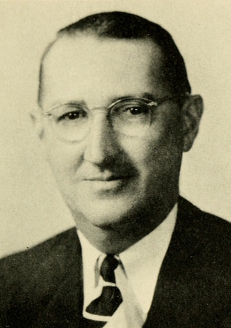
Thomas Flaherty

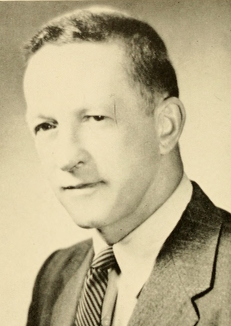
Edward Dickson

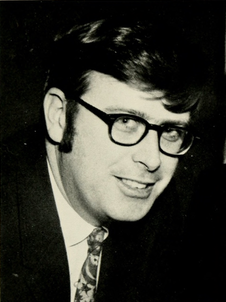
Peter Harrington

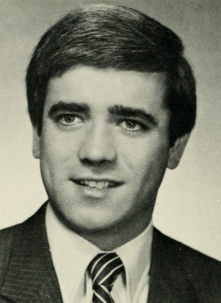
John Cox

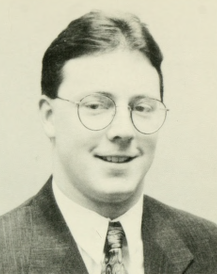
Thomas Golden

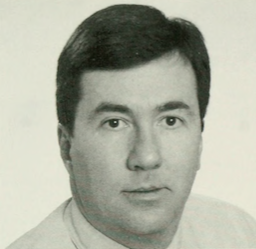
David Nangle
