= Massachusetts Senate's 3rd Middlesex district =

American legislative district

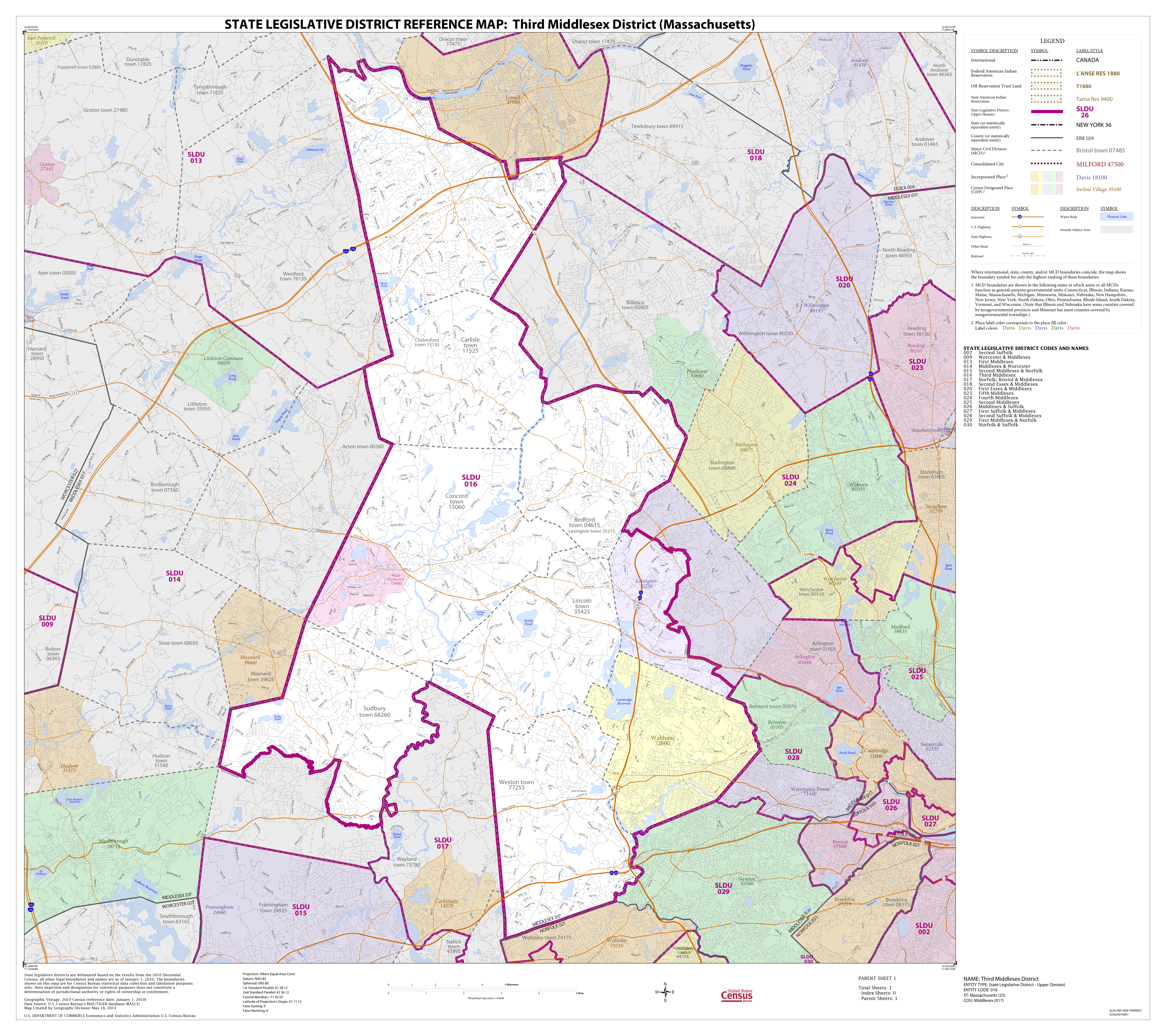
Map of Massachusetts Senate's 3rd Middlesex district, based on the 2010 United States census.

Massachusetts Senate's 3rd Middlesex district in the United States is one of 40 legislative districts of the Massachusetts Senate. It covers portions of Middlesex county. Democrat Mike Barrett of Lexington has represented the district since 2013.

== Locales represented ==
The district includes the following localities:

- Bedford
- Carlisle
- Chelmsford
- Concord
- Lexington
- Lincoln
- Sudbury
- Waltham
- Weston

=== Former locales ===
The district previously covered the following:

- Brighton, circa 1860s
- Cambridge, circa 1860s

== Senators ==
- John W. Bacon, circa 1859
- Elmer Stevens
- Joseph Knox
- Charles Austin
- Charles V. Blanchard, circa 1911
- James Conlan Scanlan, circa 1935
- Burton F. Faulkner, circa 1945
- James J. Corbett, circa 1957
- Denis L. McKenna, circa 1969
- Stephen John McGrail, circa 1975
- John A. Brennan, Jr., circa 1979-1985
- Richard R. Tisei, circa 1993
- Susan Fargo, circa 2002
- Michael J. Barrett, 2013-current

== Images ==
Portraits of legislators

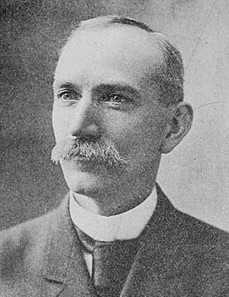
Elmer Stevens

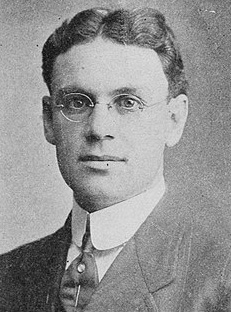
Joseph Knox

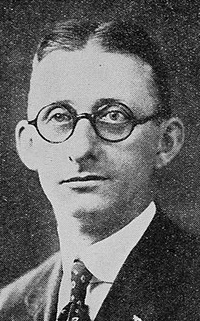
Charles Austin

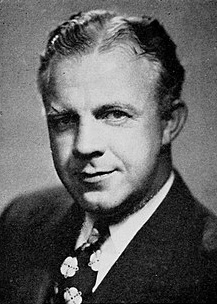
Burton Faulkner

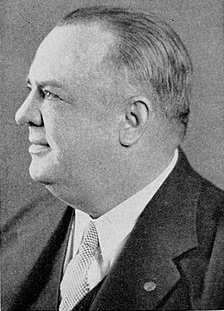
James Corbett

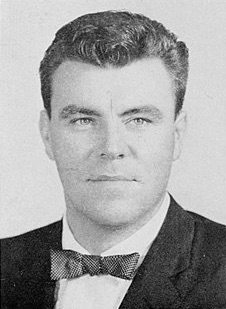
Denis McKenna

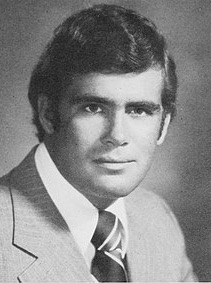
Stephen John McGrail

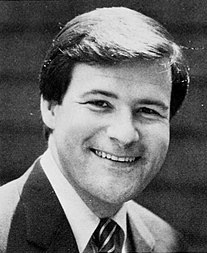
John A. Brennan Jr.

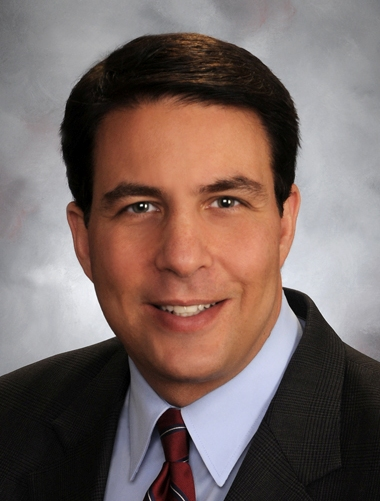
Richard Tisei

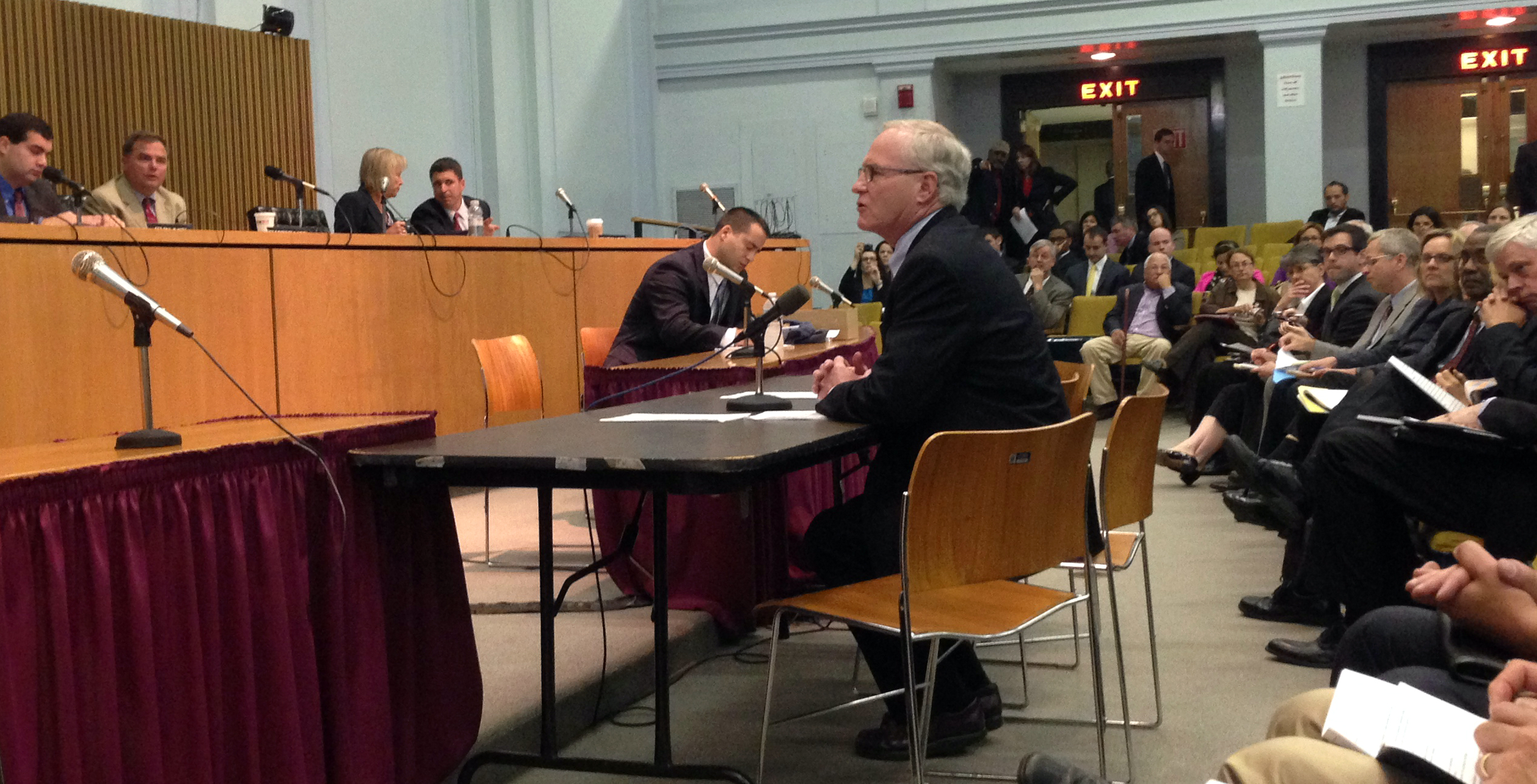
Michael J. Barrett

== See also ==
- List of Massachusetts Senate elections
- List of Massachusetts General Courts
- List of former districts of the Massachusetts Senate
- Other Middlesex County districts of the Massachusett Senate: 1st, 2nd, 4th, 5th; 1st Essex and Middlesex; 2nd Essex and Middlesex; 1st Middlesex and Norfolk, 2nd Middlesex and Norfolk; Middlesex and Suffolk; Middlesex and Worcester; Norfolk, Bristol and Middlesex; 1st Suffolk and Middlesex; 2nd Suffolk and Middlesex
- Middlesex County districts of the Massachusetts House of Representatives: 1st, 2nd, 3rd, 4th, 5th, 6th, 7th, 8th, 9th, 10th, 11th, 12th, 13th, 14th, 15th, 16th, 17th, 18th, 19th, 20th, 21st, 22nd, 23rd, 24th, 25th, 26th, 27th, 28th, 29th, 30th, 31st, 32nd, 33rd, 34th, 35th, 36th, 37th
