= Massachusetts Senate's 5th Middlesex district =

American legislative district

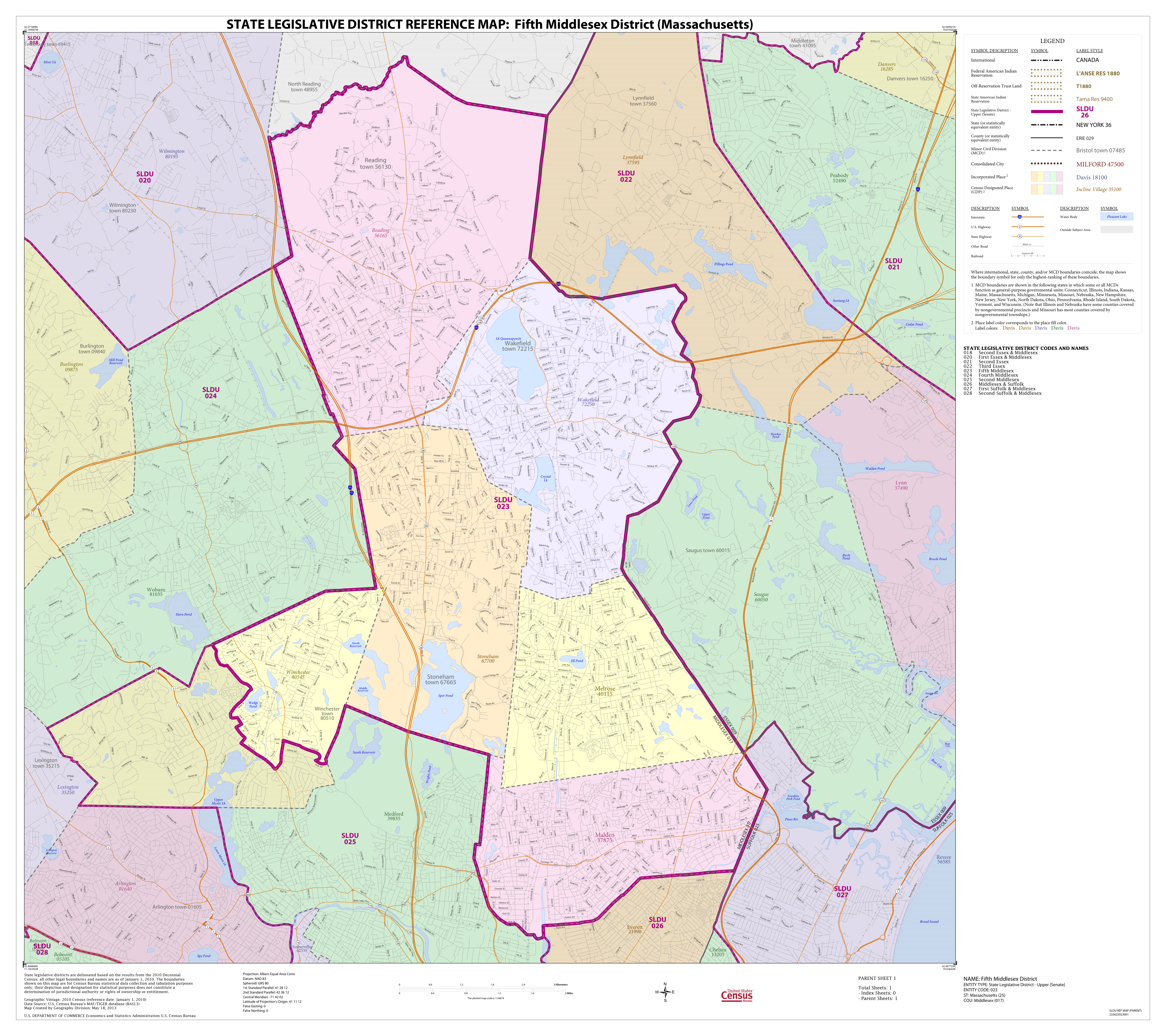
Map of Massachusetts Senate's 5th Middlesex district, based on the 2010 United States census.

Massachusetts Senate's 5th Middlesex district in the United States is one of 40 legislative districts of the Massachusetts Senate. It covers portions of Middlesex county. Democrat Jason Lewis of Winchester has represented the district since 2014.

== Locales represented ==
The district includes the following localities:

- Malden
- Melrose
- Reading
- Stoneham
- Wakefield
- Winchester

=== Former locales ===
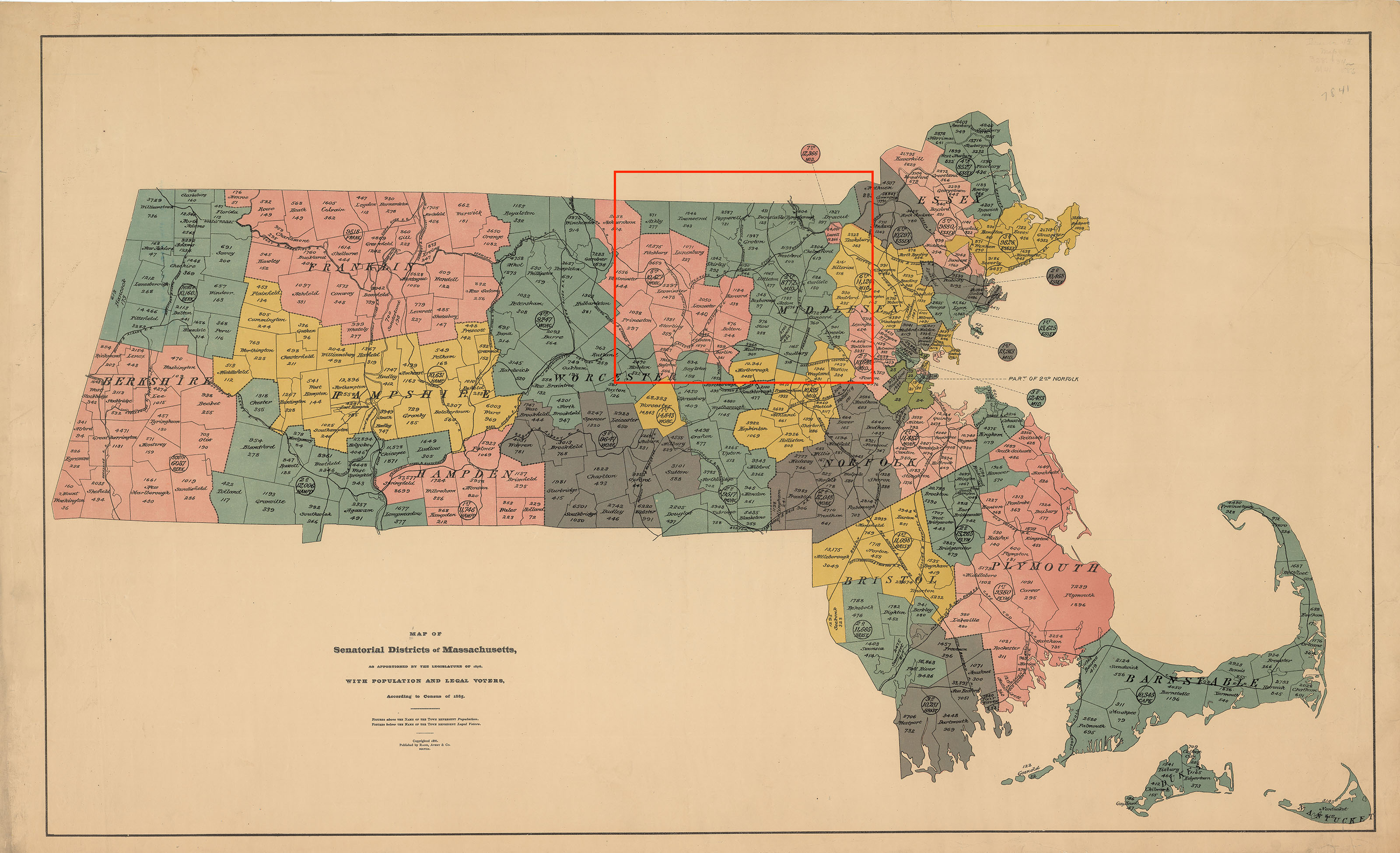
Map of the 1876 apportionment of the 5th Middlesex senatorial district

The district previously covered the following:

- Acton, circa 1860s–1870s
- Ashby, circa 1860s–1870s
- Ayer, circa 1870s
- Boxborough, circa 1860s–1870s
- Carlisle, circa 1860s–1870s
- Chelmsford, circa 1870s
- Concord, circa 1860s–1870s
- Dracut, circa 1870s
- Dunstable, circa 1860s–1870s
- Groton, circa 1860s–1870s
- Hudson, circa 1860s–1870s
- Lincoln, circa 1860s–1870s
- Littleton, circa 1860s–1870s
- Marlborough, circa 1860s
- Maynard, circa 1870s
- Pepperell, circa 1860s–1870s
- Shirley, circa 1860s–1870s
- Stow, circa 1860s–1870s
- Sudbury, circa 1860s–1870s
- Townsend, circa 1860s–1870s
- Tyngsborough, circa 1860s–1870s
- Westford, circa 1860s–1870s

== Senators ==
- Horace Conn, circa 1859
- John Mitchell
- Charles Sumner Smith
- John Gibbs
- George G. Moyse, circa 1935
- Richard I. Furbush, circa 1945
- William E. Hays, circa 1957
- James DeNormandie, circa 1969
- Carol Campbell Amick, 1978–1989
- Lucile P. Hicks, 1991–1996
- Katherine Clark
- Jason M. Lewis, April 16, 2014 – present

== Images ==
Portraits of legislators

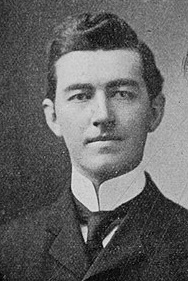
John Mitchell

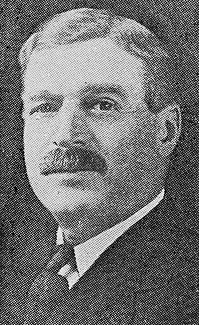
Charles Sumner Smith

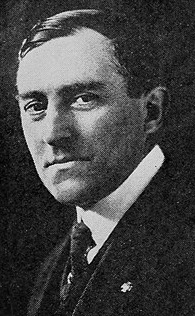
John Gibbs

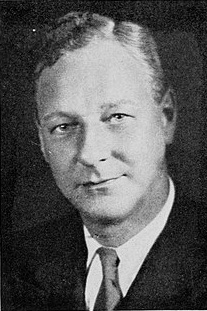
Richard Furbush

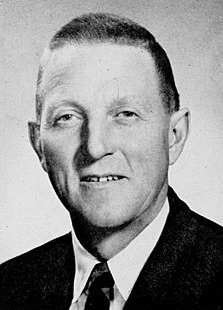
James DeNormandie

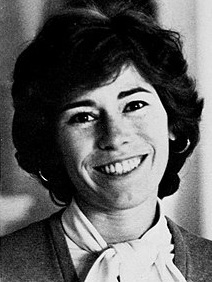
Carol Campbell Amick

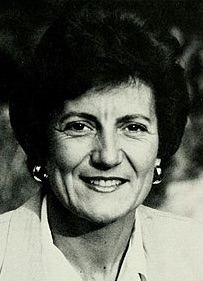
Lucile Hicks

== See also ==
- List of Massachusetts Senate elections
- List of Massachusetts General Courts
- List of former districts of the Massachusetts Senate
- Middlesex County districts of the Massachusetts House of Representatives: 1st, 2nd, 3rd, 4th, 5th, 6th, 7th, 8th, 9th, 10th, 11th, 12th, 13th, 14th, 15th, 16th, 17th, 18th, 19th, 20th, 21st, 22nd, 23rd, 24th, 25th, 26th, 27th, 28th, 29th, 30th, 31st, 32nd, 33rd, 34th, 35th, 36th, 37th
