= Nancy Hasty Evans =

American politician

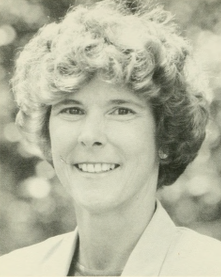
- Evans in 1995.

Member of the Massachusetts House of Representatives from the 13th Middlesex district
- In office 1990–1996
- Preceded by: Lucile P. Hicks
- Succeeded by: Susan W. Pope

Personal details
- Born: Nancy Hastings; August 7, 1948 (age 78) Boston, Massachusetts, United States
- Party: Republican
- Spouse: George J. Evans
- Children: 3
- Education: Briarcliff College; Boston University

Nancy "Hasty" Hastings Evans (born August 7, 1948 in Boston) is an American urban planner and politician from Wayland, Massachusetts. Evans represented the 13th Middlesex district as a Republican in the Massachusetts House of Representatives from 1990 to 1996. She also served as the Planning Director for the Massachusetts Bay Transportation Authority.

== Career ==
Born in Boston, Evans was raised in Wellesley, and later graduated from Briarcliff College in New York in 1970. Two years later, she received as Master's degree in Urban Planning from Boston University. In 1992, Evans first ran for office in the Republican primary election for the Massachusetts House of Representatives' 13th Middlesex district against Vicki Hammel. Evans won and succeeded Lucile P. Hicks. In 1996, Evans left the post in favor of running for the Massachusetts Senate in the 5th Middlesex district, but ultimately lost to Susan Fargo. Afterwards, Evans was hired as the Planning Director for the Massachusetts Bay Transportation Authority. She resigned from the position in 1999.

== See also ==
- 1991-1992 Massachusetts legislature
- 1993-1994 Massachusetts legislature
- 1995-1996 Massachusetts legislature
- List of Boston University people
