= Ravi Simon =

American politician

Member-elect of the Massachusetts House of Representatives from the 13th Middlesex district
- Assuming office January 2027
- Succeeding: Carmine Gentile

Personal details
- Party: Democratic
- Education: Lincoln-Sudbury Regional High School; Brandeis University (BA)

Ravi Simon is an American politician. A member of the Democratic Party, he is the member-elect for the 13th Middlesex district of the Massachusetts House of Representatives. Simon is the first state legislator of South Asian descent elected in Massachusetts, alongside Leila Migliorelli, whom was elected on the same day.

Simon is a native of Sudbury, Massachusetts, which he now represents. Simon graduated from Lincoln-Sudbury Regional High School in 2015 and from Brandeis University in 2019, with a bachelor's degree in politics, history and philosophy. Simon previously worked for his predecessor in the 13th Middlesex District, Carmine Gentile, as an aide in the Massachusetts State House.

Simon ran unopposed in his 2026 election to the Massachusetts House of Representatives.
