= List of mayors of Melrose, Massachusetts =

This is a list of the past and present Mayors of Melrose, Massachusetts.

| # | Mayor | Picture | Term | Party | Notes |
|---|---|---|---|---|---|
| 1st | Levi S. Gould | | January 1, 1900 – January 1, 1901 | Republican | |
| 2nd | John Larrabee | | January 1, 1901 – January 1903 | Republican | |
| 3rd | Sidney Homer Buttrick | | January 1, 1903 - January 1, 1906 | Republican | |
| 4th | Charles J. Barton | | 1906-1906 | Democrat | |
| 5th | Eugene H. Moore | | 1907 - 1911 | | |
| 6th | Charles E. French | | January 1912 – January 1913 | | |
| 7th | Oliver B. Munroe | | January 1913 – January 4, 1915 | | |
| 8th | Charles H. Adams | | January 4, 1915 – 1921 | Republican | |
| 9th | Angier Goodwin | | 1921 – January 2, 1923 | Republican | |
| 10th | Paul H. Provandie | | January 2, 1923 – 1925 | | |
| 11th | Albert M. Tibbetts | | 1925–1930 | | |
| 12th | Robert A. Perkins | | 1931–1941 | | |
| 13th | Carl A. Raymond | | 1942–1948 | | |
| 14th | Thomas L. Thistle | | 1948–1954 | | |
| 15th | Lawrence W. Lloyd | | 1954–1964 | | |
| 16th | Paul S. Vaitses | | 1964–1968 | Republican | |
| 17th | Thomas F. Sullivan | | 1968–1971 | | |
| 18th | James E. Milano | | 1972–1992 | Republican | |
| 19th | Richard Lyons | | 1992 – January 5, 1997 | Democrat | |
| 20th | Patrick Guerriero | | January 5, 1997 – May 2001 | Republican | Resigned to become Deputy Chief of Staff to Acting Governor Jane M. Swift |
| A | Robert J. Dolan | | May 2001 – January 7, 2002 | Democrat | Acting Mayor |
| 21st | Robert J. Dolan | | January 7, 2002 – February 2018 | Democrat | Resigned to become Lynnfield Town Administrator |
| A | Gail F. Infurna | | February 5, 2018 – November 15, 2019 | Democrat | Acting interim Mayor |
| 22nd | Paul A. Brodeur | | November 15, 2019 – January 8, 2024 | Democrat | |
| 23nd | Jennifer Grigoraitis | | January 8, 2024 – present | Democrat | |
