= Lucile P. Hicks =

American politician (born 1938)

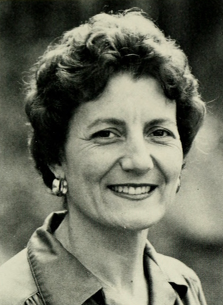

Member of the Massachusetts Senate from the 5th Middlesex district
- In office 1990–1997
- Preceded by: Carol C. Amick
- Succeeded by: Susan Fargo

Member of the Massachusetts House of Representatives from the 13th Middlesex district
- In office 1981–1990
- Preceded by: Ann Cole Gannett
- Succeeded by: Nancy Hasty Evans

Personal details
- Born: May 11, 1938 (age 88) Greenwood, Mississippi, U.S.

Lucile P. Hicks (born May 11, 1938) is an American Republican politician from Wayland, Massachusetts.

Hicks was born on May 11, 1938, in Greenwood, Mississippi. She graduated from Millsaps College in 1960 and Harvard Kennedy School of Government in 1986. She represented the 13th Middlesex district in the Massachusetts House of Representatives from 1981 to 1990 and the 5th Middlesex district in the Massachusetts Senate from 1990 to 1996. She was the House minority whip from 1987 to 1988 and the first assistant minority leader of the Senate from 1993 to 1997.

== See also ==
- 1981–1982 Massachusetts legislature
- 1983–1984 Massachusetts legislature
- 1985–1986 Massachusetts legislature
- 1987–1988 Massachusetts legislature
- 1989–1990 Massachusetts legislature
- 1991–1992 Massachusetts legislature
- 1993–1994 Massachusetts legislature
- 1995–1996 Massachusetts legislature
