= Kate Lipper-Garabedian =

American politician

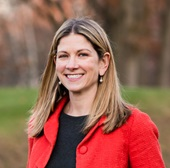

Member of the Massachusetts House of Representatives from the 32nd Middlesex district
- Incumbent
- Assumed office March 25, 2020
- Preceded by: Paul A. Brodeur
- Succeeded by: Leila Migliorelli (elect)

Member of the Melrose City Council
- In office 2018–2020
- Succeeded by: Maya Jamaleddine

Personal details
- Party: Democratic
- Children: 2
- Education: University of Virginia, B.A. Harvard Law School, J.D.
- Website: www.kateforrep.com

Kate Lipper-Garabedian is an American politician who represents the 32nd Middlesex district in the Massachusetts House of Representatives. A member of the Democratic Party, her district encompasses the city of Melrose and portions of the city of Malden and the town of Wakefield.

Prior to her election to the state legislature, Lipper-Garabedian served on the Melrose City Council.

== Early life and career ==
Lipper-Garabedian grew up in Richmond, Virginia, the daughter of two newspaper reporters. She earned a bachelor's degree in English and History from the University of Virginia and a Juris Doctor degree from Harvard Law School.

From 2003 to 2005, Lipper-Garabedian taught seventh grade through Teach for America before becoming an attorney. She later served as chief legal counsel at the Massachusetts Executive Office of Education from 2015 to 2020.

== Political career ==
In 2018, Lipper-Garabedian was elected to an at-large seat on the Melrose City Council.

In 2020, Lipper-Garabedian entered the special election for the 32nd Middlesex district in the Massachusetts House of Representatives to succeed Paul A. Brodeur, who had resigned after being elected mayor of Melrose. She defeated two other candidates in the Democratic primary and Republican nominee Brandon Reid in the special general election.

She was sworn in by Governor Charlie Baker on March 25, 2020. Due to the COVID-19 pandemic, the ceremony was held under social distancing protocols at the Grand Staircase of the State House, rather than during a formal House session.

In 2026, Lipper-Garabedian announced her candidacy for the 5th Middlesex district of the Massachusetts Senate. She received the endorsement of incumbent senator Jason Lewis.

== Personal life ==
Lipper-Garabedian lives in Melrose with her husband, Mark, and two children.

== Electoral record ==
Special 2020 Democratic primary election: Massachusetts House of Representatives, 32nd Middlesex district
Party	Candidate	Votes	%
Democratic	Kate Lipper-Garabedian	2,580	68.1%
Democratic	Ann McGonigle Santos	867	22.9%
Democratic	Mathew Helman	342	9.0%

Special 2020 general election: Massachusetts House of Representatives, 32nd Middlesex district
Party	Candidate	Votes	%
Democratic	Kate Lipper-Garabedian	10,816	81.5%
Republican	Brandon Reid	2,461	18.5%

== See also ==
- 2019–2020 Massachusetts legislature
- 2021–2022 Massachusetts legislature
