= Oliver B. Munroe =

American mayor (1856–1916)

Oliver Buchanan Munroe

Mayor of Melrose, Massachusetts
- In office January 1913 – January 4, 1915
- Preceded by: Charles E. French
- Succeeded by: Charles H. Adams

Personal details
- Born: 22 May 1856 Providence, Rhode Island
- Died: March 1, 1916 (aged 59) Providence, Rhode Island
- Spouse(s): Annie S. Potter (1857–1885); Ethel B. Cross
- Children: Ethelind A. Munroe
- Education: Brown University (Master of Arts)

Oliver Buchanan Munroe (1856–1916) was an American politician who served as the seventh mayor of Melrose, Massachusetts.

Political offices
Preceded by Charles E. French	7th Mayor of Melrose, Massachusetts; January 1913 – January 4, 1915	Succeeded by Charles H. Adams
