= Mary Fantasia =

American politician from Massachusetts (1919–2020)

Mary E. Fantasia
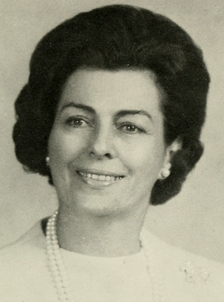

Member of the Massachusetts House of Representatives from the 8th Middlesex district
- In office 1975–1978

Member of the Massachusetts House of Representatives from the 4th Middlesex district
- In office 1971–1974 Serving with Marie E. Howe and Vincent J. Piro

Personal details
- Born: October 1, 1919 Arlington, Massachusetts
- Died: March 5, 2020 (aged 100)
- Party: Democratic
- Spouse: Anthony N. Fantasia
- Children: Patricia Fantasia Stewart; Kevin Fantasia; Joanne Fantasia Cedrone

Mary E. (Coyne) Fantasia (October 1, 1919 – March 5, 2020) was an American politician from the state of Massachusetts.

== Political career ==
She served in the Massachusetts House of Representatives from 1971 to 1978, representing the 4th Middlesex district from 1971 to 1974 and the 8th Middlesex district from 1975 to 1978. She lost renomination in 1978. She served as a Democratic Presidential Elector in 1960, 1964 and 1976. She was a Democratic National Committeewoman for 10 years and served as the Vice Chairwoman of the Massachusetts Democratic State Committee.

== Electoral history ==
1990 Massachusetts 30th Middlesex District State Representative Democratic Primary

Patricia D. Jehlen (D) 45.5%
Stanley M. Koty Jr. (D) 35.2%
Mary E. Fantasia (D) 19.1%

1978 Massachusetts 31st Middlesex District State Representative Democratic Primary

Marie E. Howe (D) (inc.) 50.8%
Mary E. Fantasia (D) (inc.) 49.2%

1976 Massachusetts 8th Middlesex District State Representative General Election

Mary E. Fantasia (D) (inc.) 100.0%

1974 Massachusetts 8th Middlesex District State Representative General Election

Mary E. Fantasia (D) (inc.) 100.0%

1972 Massachusetts 4th Middlesex District State Representative General Election

Marie E. Howe (D) (inc.) 35.5%
Vincent J. Piro (D) (inc.) 34.7%
Mary E. Fantasia (D) (inc.) 29.7%

1970 Massachusetts 4th Middlesex District State Representative General Election

Marie E. Howe (D) (inc.) 35.8%
Vincent J. Piro (D) (inc.) 29.6%
Mary E. Fantasia (D) 26.5%
Arthur Vitt Vitagliano (R) 8.0%

1970 Massachusetts 4th Middlesex District State Representative Democratic Primary

Marie E. Howe (D) (inc.) 28.6%
Vincent J. Piro (D) (inc.) 21.9%
Mary E. Fantasia (D) 12.6%
William J. Joyce (D) 11.7%
John K. Holmes (D) 9.4%
George J. Moran Jr. (D) 7.0%
John K. Makredes (D) 4.6%
Roger Faulkner (D) 4.2%
