= Leila Migliorelli =

American politician

Member-elect of the Massachusetts House of Representatives from the 32nd Middlesex district
- Assuming office January 2027
- Succeeding: Kate Lipper-Garabedian

Personal details
- Party: Democratic

Leila Migliorelli is an American politician. A member of the Democratic Party, she is the member-elect for the 32nd Middlesex district of the Massachusetts House of Representatives. Migliorelli is the first state legislator of South Asian descent elected in Massachusetts, alongside Ravi Simon, whom was elected on the same day.
