= Deborah Blumer =

American politician

Member of the Massachusetts House of Representatives from the 6th Middlesex District
- In office January 2001 – October 13, 2006

Personal details
- Born: October 18, 1941
- Died: October 13, 2006 (aged 64)
- Party: Democratic
- Education: Framingham State College (B.A.); Simmons College (MBA)

Deborah D. Blumer was a Democratic member of the Massachusetts House of Representatives from Framingham. She served in the House from 2001 until her death.

Blumer was graduated magna cum laude from Framingham State College, and subsequently earned an MBA with distinctions from the Simmons College Graduate School of Management. Prior to her election to the House in 2000, she worked for several businesses, including Compaq. In the House, she served on the Joint Committee on Higher Education, the Joint Committee on Children and Families, and the Joint Committee on Public Health.

Blumer was married to Irwin Blumer and had children and grandchildren. Initial reports after her death indicated that she suffered a heart attack while driving. She was pronounced dead at MetroWest Medical Center. At the time of her death in 2006, Blumer was five days away from her 65th birthday.

Blumer was a supporter of Israel and Jewish-related causes. Her funeral was held at Temple Beth Am in Framingham.

Although she was nearly one month deceased as of the Massachusetts House elections, 2006, Democrats were unable to replace her as their candidate due to filing deadlines. Running post-mortem, she finished in third place, garnering 20% of the vote behind two write-in candidates. Write-in candidate Democrat Pam Richardson succeeded her, winning 37% of the vote.

== See also ==
- 2001–2002 Massachusetts legislature
- 2003–2004 Massachusetts legislature
- 2005–2006 Massachusetts legislature

Preceded by John Stasik	Massachusetts House of Representatives; 6th Middlesex District Representative; January 2001 - October 13, 2006	Succeeded by Pam Richardson
