= Winthrop H. Fairbank =

American politician

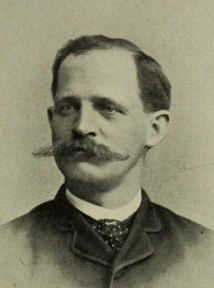
- Fairbank in 1910

Member of the Massachusetts House of Representatives from the 13th Middlesex district
- In office 1910–1912
- Preceded by: Alfred L. Cutting
- Succeeded by: Waldo L. Stone

Personal details
- Born: Winthrop Harvey Fairbank; March 13, 1857 Sudbury, Massachusetts, United States
- Died: February 13, 1922 (aged 64) Concord, Massachusetts, United States
- Party: Democratic
- Spouse: Ida Nancy Haynes (m. 1889)
- Children: 3

Winthrop Harvey Fairbank (March 13, 1857–February 13, 1922) was an American farmer and politician from Sudbury, Massachusetts. Fairbank represented the 13th Middlesex district as a Democrat in the Massachusetts House of Representatives from 1910 to 1912.

== Career ==
In 1857, Fairbank was born in Sudbury to Emily A. Wheeler and Jonathan Parker Fairbank. He was a sixth-generation descendant of Jonathan Fairbanks, an English colonist, who built the Fairbanks House in Dedham.

A farmer by trade, Fairbank purchased Fairbank Farm on Old Sudbury Road in 1880 and expanded into dairy farming a decade later. Fairbank later married Ida Nancy Haynes in 1889. They had three children: Parker Wheeler; Harvey Nathan; and Myra Louise, later Baldwin.

In 1909, Fairbank ran to represent the 13th Middlesex district as a Democrat in the Massachusetts House of Representatives. He then won the election against Charles W. Prescott of Concord. Fairbank did not seek reelection and was succeeded by Waldo L. Stone, also from Sudbury. He continued in politics by serving as a Selectman for the Town of Sudbury from 1914 until his death in 1922. Fairbank died in Concord, and three days later, his funeral was held at the First Parish of Sudbury.

The Sudbury Historical Society contains a cabinet card portrait of Fairbank, photographed by Elmer Chickering in 1910.

== See also ==
- 1910 Massachusetts legislature
