= Massachusetts House of Representatives' 32nd Middlesex district =

American legislative district

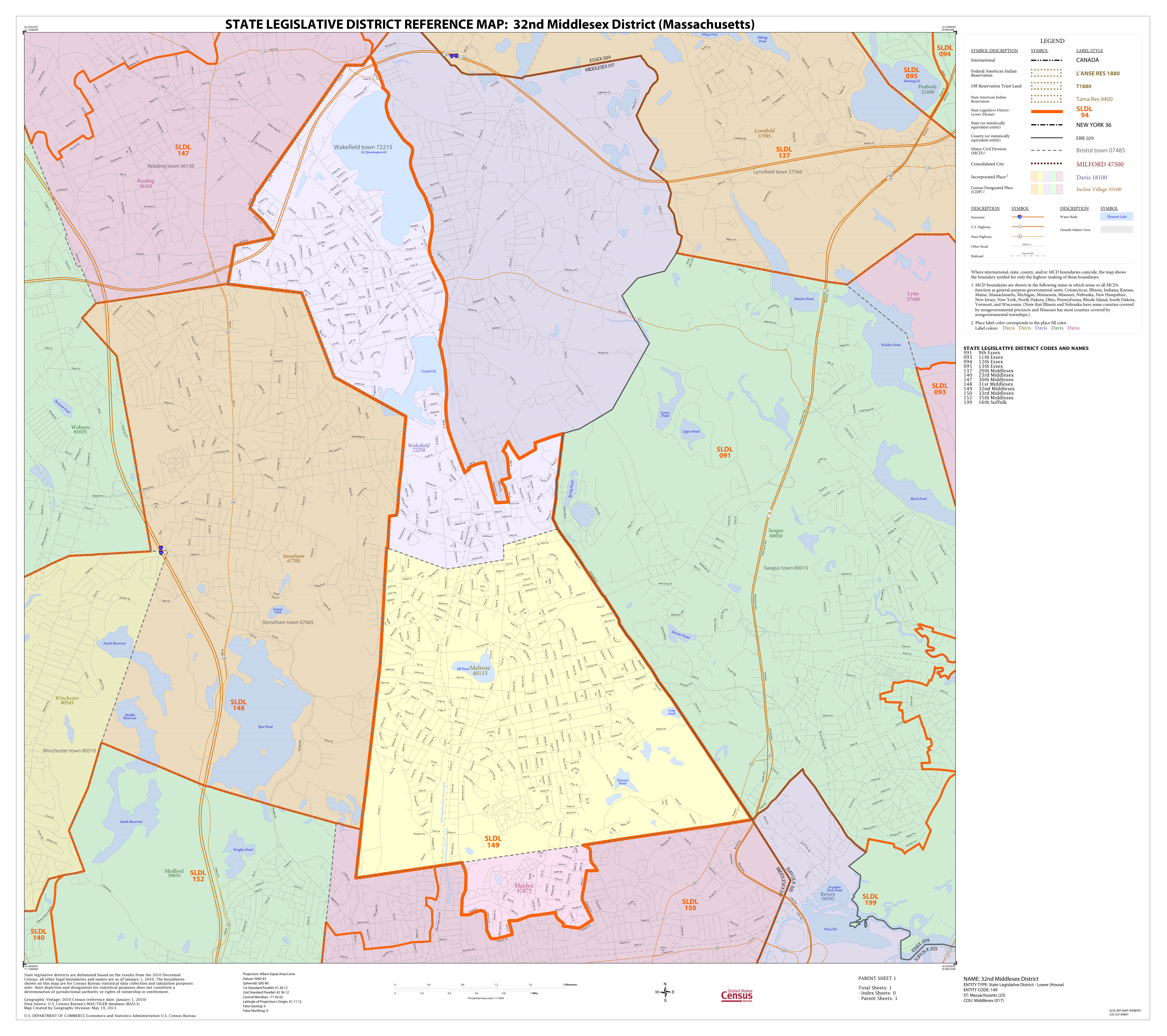
Map of Massachusetts House of Representatives' 32nd Middlesex district, based on the 2010 United States census.

Massachusetts House of Representatives' 32nd Middlesex district in the United States is one of 160 legislative districts included in the lower house of the Massachusetts General Court. It covers part of Malden, Melrose, and part of Wakefield in Middlesex County. Democrat Kate Lipper-Garabedian has represented the district since 2020.

The current district geographic boundary overlaps with that of the Massachusetts Senate's 5th Middlesex district.

== Representatives ==
- George Contalonis, circa 1967
- Nils Nordberg, circa 1976
- Salvatore Ciccarelli, circa 1979–1985
- John C. Bartley, circa 1990
- Warren Tolman, 1991–1995
- Rachel Kaprielian, 1995–2003
- Mike Festa, 2003–2007
- Katherine Clark, March 13, 2008 – January 5, 2011
- Paul A. Brodeur, 2011–2019
- Kate Lipper-Garabedian, 2020–current

== See also ==
- List of Massachusetts House of Representatives elections
- List of Massachusetts General Courts
- List of former districts of the Massachusetts House of Representatives
- Other Middlesex County districts of the Massachusetts House of Representatives: 1st, 2nd, 3rd, 4th, 5th, 6th, 7th, 8th, 9th, 10th, 11th, 12th, 13th, 14th, 15th, 16th, 17th, 18th, 19th, 20th, 21st, 22nd, 23rd, 24th, 25th, 26th, 27th, 28th, 29th, 30th, 31st, 33rd, 34th, 35th, 36th, 37th

== Images ==
Portraits of legislators

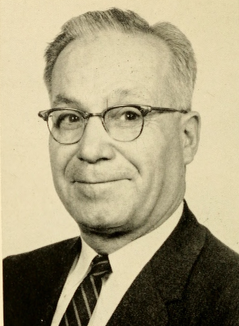
George Contalonis

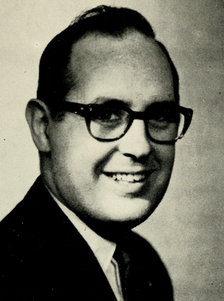
Nils Nordberg

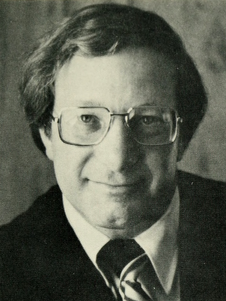
Salvatore Ciccarelli

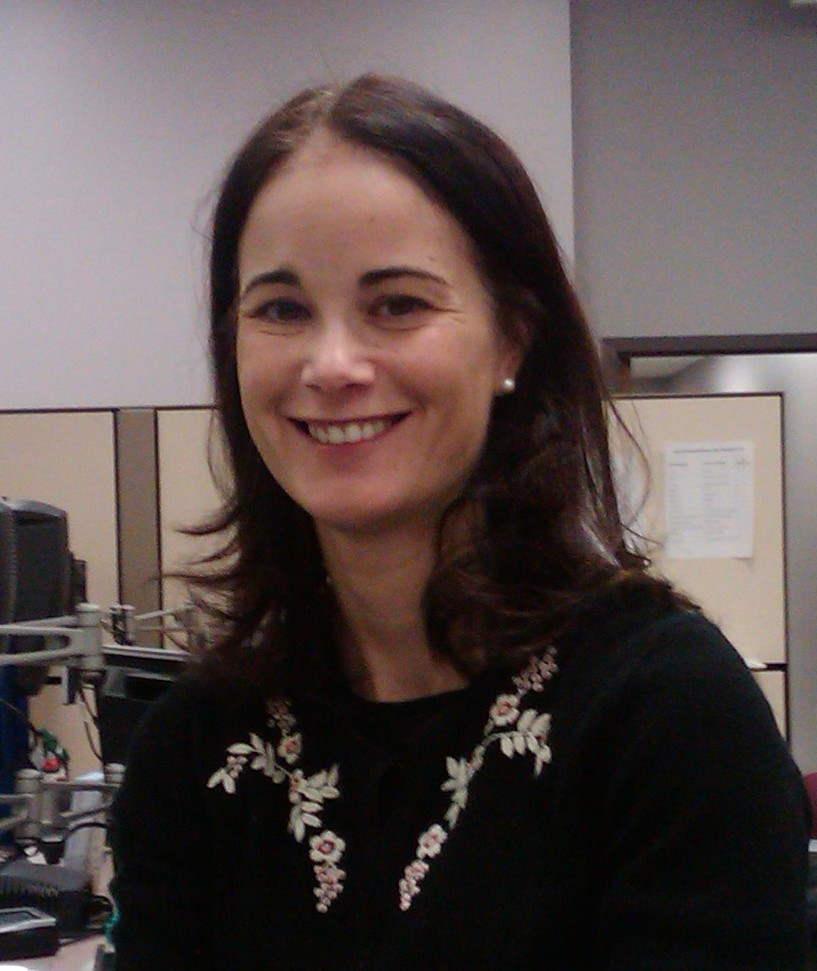
Rachel Kaprielian

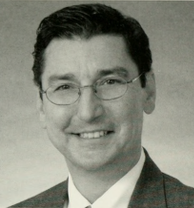
Michael Festa

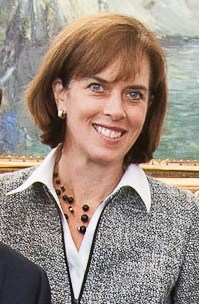
Katherine Clark

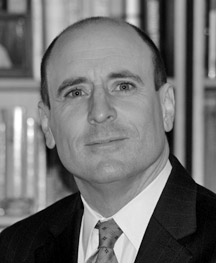
Paul Brodeur

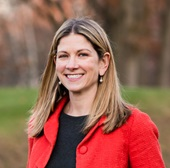
Kate Lipper-Garabedian
