= Kay Khan =

American politician (born 1941)

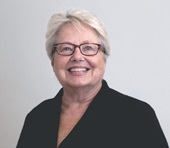

Member of the Massachusetts House of Representatives
- In office January 4, 1995 – January 1, 2025
- Succeeded by: Mah Sangiolo

Personal details
- Born: June 22, 1941 (age 85)
- Children: 3
- Profession: Psychiatric nurse

Kay Khan (born June 22, 1941) is an American politician and a member of the Democratic Party who previously served in the Massachusetts House of Representatives. She represented the City of Newton in the Massachusetts House of Representatives from 1995 to 2024. In 2024, she chose not to run for election and retired at the end of her term.

== Early life and career ==
Khan earned her bachelor's degree from Boston University School of Nursing. Her first job as a nurse was at Boston Children's Hospital. Following this, she became an instructor for Boston University School of Nursing undergraduate students on a pediatric rotation. She went on to earn a master's degree in psychiatric mental health nursing from Boston University, graduating with honors and worked in a private group practice in Newton for close to twenty years.

Khan has led several caucuses in the Massachusetts House, such as the Mental Health Caucus and the Women Legislators Caucus among others. Khan has also been a part of several task forces and commissions such as the commission to End Homelessness and the Special Commission on Early Education and Care and the Task Force on Justice Involved Women and Their Children, under the aegis of the Massachusetts Caucus of Women Legislators. Khan currently serves on the Unaccompanied Homeless Youth Commission, the Criminal Justice Commission, the Child Sexual Abuse Prevention Task Force, the Task Force on Child Welfare Data Reporting, the Massachusetts Coalition to Ban Conversion Therapy on Minors, and the Department of Youth Services Safety Task Force.

Khan is an adamant supporter of improving the rights, health, well-being, and conditions of incarcerated individuals.

== Personal life ==
Khan has lived in Newton for more than forty years and has three children and seven grandchildren. She is Jewish.

== See also ==
- Massachusetts House of Representatives' 11th Middlesex district
- 2019–2020 Massachusetts legislature
- 2021–2022 Massachusetts legislature
