= Levi S. Gould =

American politician

Levi Swanton Gould
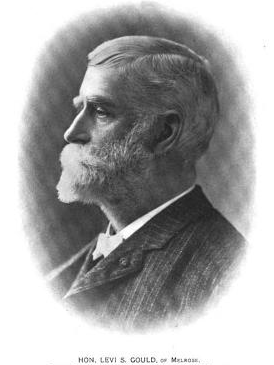

1st Mayor of Melrose, Massachusetts
- In office January 1, 1900 – January 1, 1901
- Preceded by: None
- Succeeded by: John Larrabee

Chairman of the Middlesex County Commissioners
- In office January 1897 – March 22, 1917

Member of the Middlesex County Commission
- In office January 1897 – March 22, 1917

Member of the Massachusetts House of Representatives
- In office 1868–1869

Chairman of the Board of Selectmen of the Town of Melrose, Massachusetts
- In office 1885–1889

Member of the Board of Selectmen of the Town of Melrose, Massachusetts
- In office 1885–1892

Member of the Board of Selectmen of the Town of Melrose, Massachusetts
- In office 1869–1869

Town Meeting Moderator of the Town Meeting for the Town of Melrose, Massachusetts
- In office 1865–1899
- Succeeded by: None - office abolished

Personal details
- Born: March 27, 1831 Dixmont, Maine
- Died: March 22, 1917 (aged 85) Melrose, Massachusetts
- Party: Republican
- Spouse: Mary Eliza Payne
- Children: Mary Pearl Gould, b. September 5, 1862; Annie Elizabeth Gould, b. April 30, 1866.
- Occupation: Shoemaker
- Profession: Bookkeeper, Accountant; Furniture manufacturer
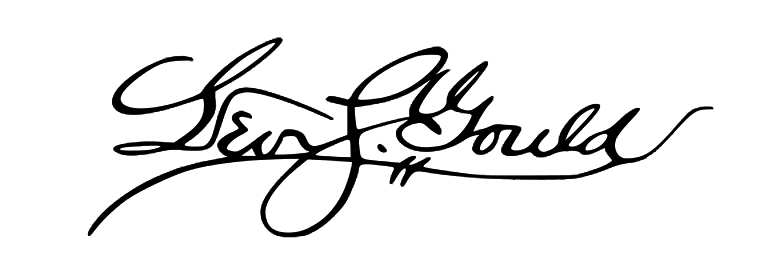
- Signature

Levi Swanton Gould (March 27, 1831 – March 22, 1917) was an American businessman and politician who served as a member, and chairman of the Middlesex County, Massachusetts county commission, and as the first mayor of Melrose, Massachusetts.

== Early life and education ==
Gould was born to Dr. Levi Gould and Elizabeth Webb (Whitmore) Gould in Dixmont, Maine on March 27, 1831. When he was six months old his family moved to his father's home town of Stoneham, Massachusetts. His next three siblings were born in Wilmington, Massachusetts between 1838 and 1845, after which his family moved to the Town of North Malden, (now the City of Melrose, Massachusetts). Gould was educated in the public schools of North Malden and at Waitt's and Ingalls' academies in Melrose.

== Family life ==
Gould married Mary Eliza Payne the daughter of Samuel and Mary (Vose) Payne on February 23, 1860. They had two children, Mary Pearl Gould, born on September 5, 1862, and Annie Elizabeth Gould, born April 30, 1866.

== Business career ==
In 1866 Gould became connected with the F. M. Holmes & Company. F. M. Holmes & Company, was a business that manufactured and sold furniture. 1878 Gould purchased F. M. Holmes and Company and ran it as the F. M. Holmes Furniture Company. The F. M. Holmes Furniture Company factory was in Charlestown, and its warehouse and salesroom was in Boston.

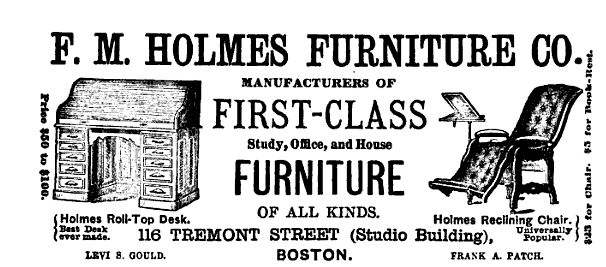
F. M. Holmes Furniture Company advertisement from the March 1886 issue of the Atlantic Monthly.

== Death ==
Gould died in Melrose on March 22, 1917.

== See also ==
- 1868 Massachusetts legislature

== End notes ==
Political offices
Preceded by None	Mayor of Melrose, Massachusetts; January 1, 1900 – January 1, 1901	Succeeded by John Larrabee
