= Wayne Matewsky =

American politician

Member of the Massachusetts House of Representatives from the 28th Middlesex District
- In office 2013 – January 7, 2015
- Preceded by: Stephen Stat Smith
- Succeeded by: Joe McGonagle

Personal details
- Party: Democratic

Wayne Matewsky is a former American state legislator who served in the Massachusetts House of Representatives from 2013 to 2015. He is an Everett resident and a member of the Democratic Party. He was elected in 2013 in a special election to succeed Stephen Stat Smith, who resigned after pleading guilty to his role in a voter fraud scheme. In addition to serving as a state representative, Matewsky was a member of the Everett City Council from 1981 to 2007, and 2015 to the present, and served as Everett City Alderman from 2007 to 2013.

Shortly after winning the Democratic nomination, Matewsky received negative attention for allegedly mocking a disabled child in a restaurant and berating staff for seating him near the child. In December 2013, two former campaign workers sued Matewsky seeking payment for services provided. On January 30, 2014, he was arrested on a civil warrant for failing to pay $446 to one of his former campaign workers. Matewsky paid the bill in court and the case was dismissed. Matewsky claimed that the arrest was part of a "smear campaign" and accused his former worker of not cashing a check in order to discredit him.

Joe McGonagle defeated Matewsky in the 2014 Democratic primary by 323 votes.

Matewsky returned to city council in 2015 as he topped the ticket in the at-Large field with 2,041 votes. He led the pack for the second straight election in 2017 with 1,788 votes.

== Personal life ==
Matewsky has sponsored a "Safe Halloween Party" for his constituents and their children every year since 1980.

In 2006, while visiting relatives in Los Angeles, Matewsky helped pull survivors from the wreckage of an auto accident.
