= Stephen Stat Smith =

American politician

Member of the Massachusetts House of Representatives from the 28th Middlesex District
- In office 2007–2013
- Preceded by: Edward G. Connolly
- Succeeded by: Wayne Matewsky

Personal details
- Born: May 25, 1955 (age 71) Chelsea, Massachusetts
- Party: Democratic
- Education: Bunker Hill Community College
- Occupation: Politician

Stephen Stat Smith (born May 25, 1955) is an American politician who represented the 28th Middlesex District in the Massachusetts House of Representatives until his resignation in 2013.

== Early life ==
Smith was born on May 25, 1955, in Chelsea, Massachusetts. His parents divorced when he was young and he lived with his mother in Everett, Massachusetts' Woodlawn housing projects. He attended Everett public schools and Bunker Hill Community College.

== Political career ==
Smith was a member of the Everett Board of Aldermen from 1994 to 1995. He was an unsuccessful candidate for Mayor in 1995, Alderman At-Large in 1997, and Ward 3 Alderman in 1999. From 2001 to 2002 he was a member of the Everett Youth Commission. From 2002 to 2003 he was a member of the Everett Common Council. In 2004 he ran for state representative, but lost to incumbent Edward G. Connolly in the Democratic primary. From 2006 to 2007 he served on the Board of Aldermen.

In 2006 he was elected state representative. On December 20, 2012, US Attorney Carmen Ortiz announced that Smith had agreed to plead guilty to two misdemeanor counts of deprivation of rights under color of law for his role in a voter fraud scheme in which Smith cast absentee ballots for voters who were ineligible or unaware of ballots being cast in their names. It was announced that Smith would resign effective January 1, 2013. As part of his plea agreement, Smith will not be allowed to run for public office for five years.
