= Amy Mah Sangiolo =

American politician

Member of the Massachusetts House of Representatives from the 11th Middlesex district
- Incumbent
- Assumed office January 1, 2025
- Preceded by: Kay Khan

Personal details
- Born: Weehawken, New Jersey
- Party: Democratic

Amy Mah Sangiolo (/ˈsændʒioʊloʊ/) is an American politician. She is a Democratic member of the Massachusetts House of Representatives, representing the 11th Middlesex district.

== Biography ==
Sangiolo was born in Weehawken, New Jersey.

In 2021, Sangiolo unsuccessfully ran for mayor of Newton, Massachusetts, losing to incumbent mayor Ruthanne Fuller.

Sangiolo won in the 2024 Massachusetts House of Representatives election against Republican challenger Vladislav S. Yanosky. She was sworn in on January 1, 2025.
