= Carmine Gentile =

American politician

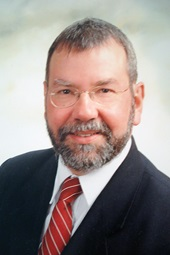

Member of the Massachusetts House of Representatives from the 13th Middlesex district
- Incumbent
- Assumed office January 7, 2015
- Preceded by: Tom Conroy

Personal details
- Party: Democratic

Carmine Lawrence Gentile is an American politician serving as a member of the Massachusetts House of Representatives since January 2015. A resident of Sudbury, Massachusetts, he was elected as a Democrat to represent the 13th Middlesex district. Gentile is a private-practice attorney who held several positions in local government before being elected to the House.

In February 2026, he announced he would not seek re-election in 2026, and endorsed his legislative aide, Ravi Simon, to be his successor.

== See also ==
- 2019–2020 Massachusetts legislature
- 2021–2022 Massachusetts legislature
