= Massachusetts House of Representatives' 9th Middlesex district =

American legislative district

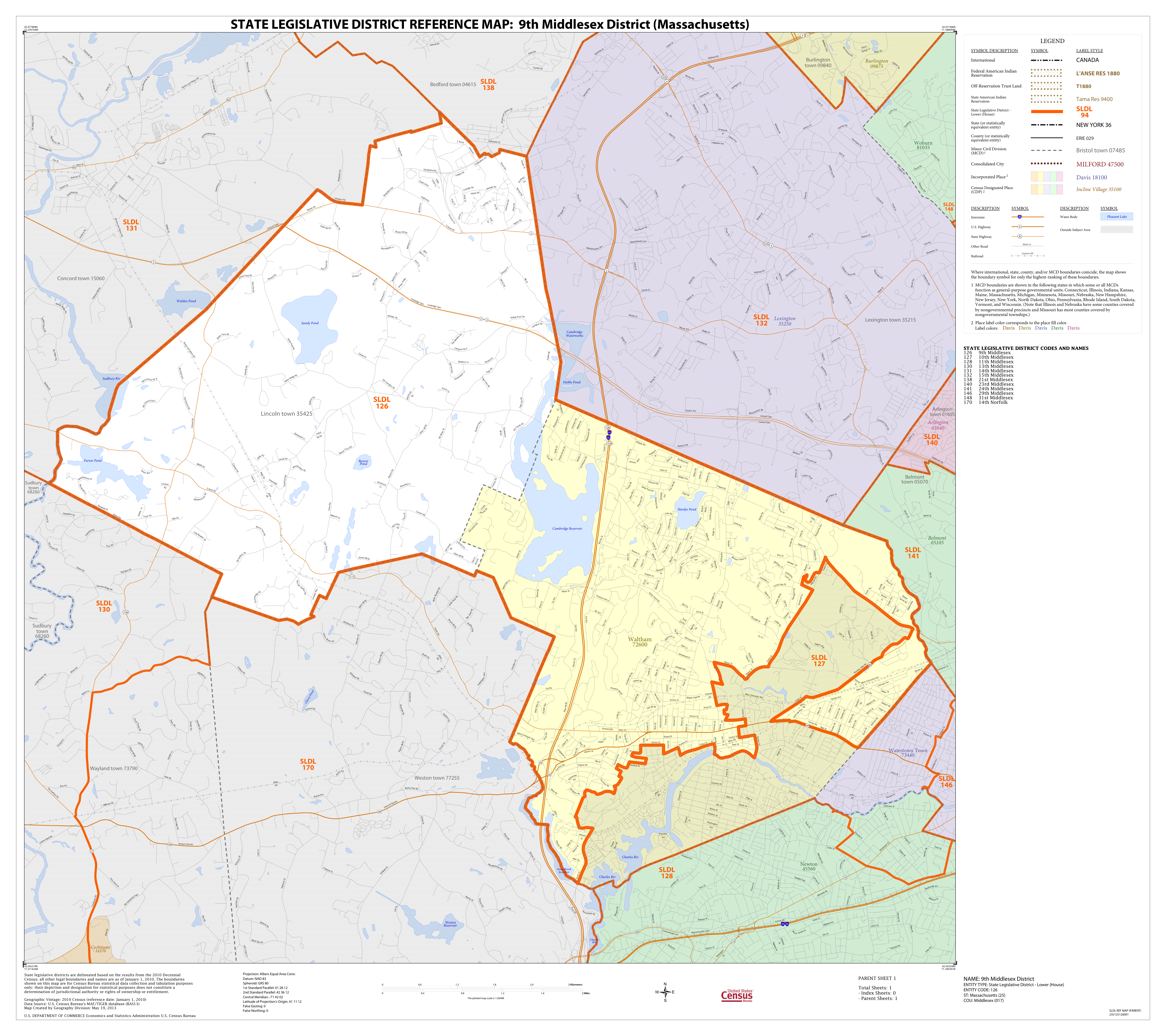
Map of Massachusetts House of Representatives' 9th Middlesex district, based on the 2010 United States census.

Massachusetts House of Representatives' 9th Middlesex district in the United States is one of 160 legislative districts included in the lower house of the Massachusetts General Court. It covers part of Middlesex County. Democrat Tom Stanley of Waltham has represented the district since 2001.

== Locales represented ==
The district includes the following localities:

- part of Waltham

This district previously included Lincoln prior to redistricting ahead of the 2022 election cycle.

The current district geographic boundary overlaps with that of the Massachusetts Senate's 3rd Middlesex district.

=== Former locale ===
The district previously covered part of Cambridge, circa 1872.

== Representatives ==
- Thomas L. French, circa 1858
- James G. Moore, circa 1858
- Joseph Crafts, circa 1859
- Josiah Rutter, circa 1859
- Daniel Lake Milliken, circa 1888
- William Allan Wilde, circa 1888
- William H. Hannagan, circa 1920
- Charles T. Kelleher, circa 1951
- John F. Cusack, circa 1975
- Thomas M. Stanley, 2001–current

== See also ==
- List of Massachusetts House of Representatives elections
- List of Massachusetts General Courts
- List of former districts of the Massachusetts House of Representatives
- Other Middlesex County districts of the Massachusetts House of Representatives: 1st, 2nd, 3rd, 4th, 5th, 6th, 7th, 8th, 10th, 11th, 12th, 13th, 14th, 15th, 16th, 17th, 18th, 19th, 20th, 21st, 22nd, 23rd, 24th, 25th, 26th, 27th, 28th, 29th, 30th, 31st, 32nd, 33rd, 34th, 35th, 36th, 37th
