= Joe McGonagle =

American politician

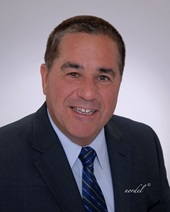

Member of the Massachusetts House of Representatives from the 28th Middlesex district
- Incumbent
- Assumed office January 7, 2015
- Preceded by: Wayne Matewsky

Personal details
- Party: Democratic

Joseph William McGonagle Jr. is a member of the Massachusetts House of Representatives.

A resident of Everett, Massachusetts, he was elected as a Democrat to represent the House of Representatives' 28th Middlesex district.

McGonagle is a former Everett city councillor.

== See also ==
- 2019–2020 Massachusetts legislature
- 2021–2022 Massachusetts legislature
