= Ruthanne Fuller =

American politician (born 1957)

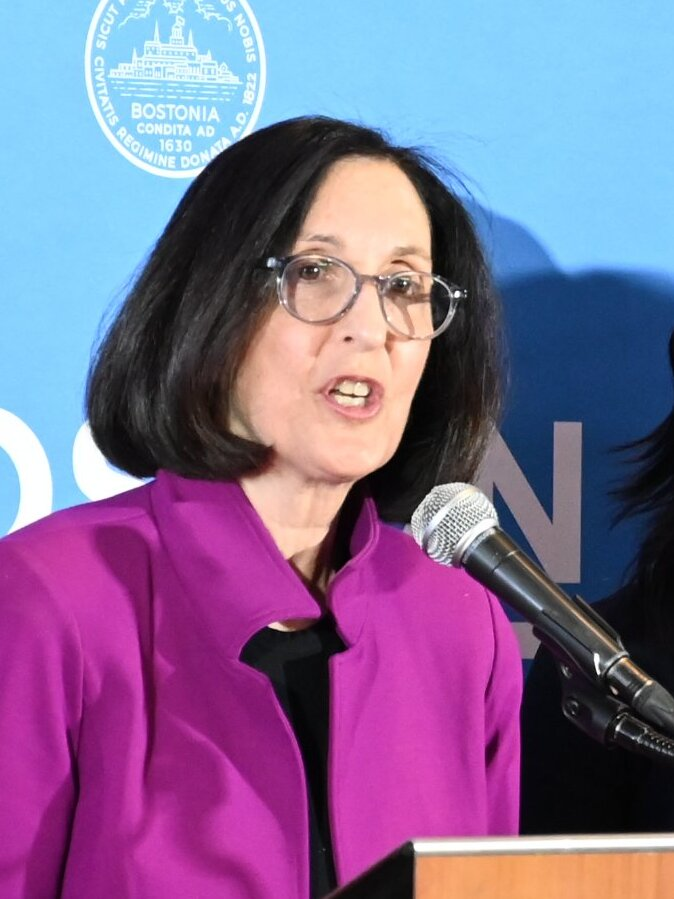
- Fuller speaking in 2022

Mayor of Newton
- In office January 1, 2018 – January 1, 2026
- Preceded by: Setti Warren
- Succeeded by: Marc Laredo

Member of the Newton Board of Aldermen
- In office January 1, 2010 – January 1, 2028
- Preceded by: Vern Vance
- Constituency: Ward 7

Personal details
- Born: 1957 (age 68–69) Detroit, Michigan
- Party: Democratic
- Children: 3

Ruthanne Fuller (née Schwartz, born December 1957) is an American politician. She was the first female mayor of Newton, Massachusetts, serving from 2018 to 2026.

== Early life and education ==
Fuller was born in December 1957 in Detroit, Michigan. She is Jewish.

Fuller attended Brown University in Rhode Island, and later earned an MBA from Harvard University. After graduating from Harvard, she married Joe Fuller, with whom she has three children. In the early 1990s, Fuller and her family moved to Chestnut Hill, Massachusetts, where she would go on to work in strategic planning.

== Political career ==
In 2009, Fuller was elected to the Newton Board of Aldermen (today known as the City Council), representing Ward 7, after being encouraged to run by retiring member Vern Vance.

In 2017, Fuller ran for mayor of Newton. She won the election with 50.6% of the vote, defeating City Council president Scott Lennon, becoming the city's first female mayor and 31st mayor overall.

In 2021, Fuller won re-election against former city councilwoman Amy Mah Sangiolo.

On December 3, 2024, Fuller announced that she would not run for a third term as mayor.

== Electoral history ==
=== 2021 ===
2021 Newton Mayoral Election
| Party | Candidate | Votes | % |
|---|---|---|---|
| Democratic | Ruthanne Fuller | 10,912 | 53.61% |
| Democratic | Amy Mah Sangiolo | 9,380 | 46.09% |
| | Write-in | 60 | 0.29% |
| Total votes | | 20,352 | 100.00% |
| | Blank/invalid ballots | 291 | |

=== 2017 ===
2017 Newton Mayoral Election
| Party | Candidate | Votes | % |
|---|---|---|---|
| Democratic | Ruthanne Fuller | 12,474 | 50.58% |
| Democratic | Scott F. Lennon | 12,101 | 49.06% |
| | Write-in | 88 | 0.04% |
| Total votes | | 24,663 | 100.00% |
| | Blank ballots | 247 | |
