= Susan W. Pope =

American politician

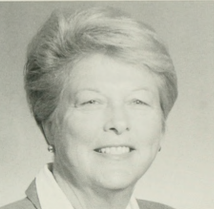
- Pope in 2005.

Member of the Massachusetts House of Representatives from the 13th Middlesex district
- In office 1997–2006
- Preceded by: Nancy Hasty Evans
- Succeeded by: Tom Conroy

Personal details
- Born: Susan Joan Wetzel; September 10, 1942 (age 84) Summit, New Jersey, United States
- Party: Republican
- Spouse: Walter F. Pope
- Children: 3 (Susan, Bradford, and Spencer)
- Education: Centenary College of Louisiana

Susan Joan Wetzel Pope (born September 10, 1942 in Summit) is an American politician from Wayland, Massachusetts. Pope represented the 13th Middlesex district as a Republican in the Massachusetts House of Representatives from 1997 to 2006.

== Career ==
Born in Summit, New Jersey, Pope graduated from Bernards High School in Bernardsville. She then received her Bachelor of Arts from Centenary College of Louisiana in 1963.

Pope later moved to Wayland, Massachusetts, where she was elected as a member of the Town of Wayland School Committee from 1984 to 1994, and then to the Board of Selectmen until 2003.

In 1996, Pope first ran for office in the Republican primary election for the Massachusetts House of Representatives' 13th Middlesex district against Maryann K. Clark. Pope won and was also victorious in the general election against Russell A. Ashton of the Democratic Party, succeeding Nancy Hasty Evans, another female Republican from Wayland. She continued to hold the post until defeat by Tom Conroy in the Massachusetts House of Representatives election in 2006. Pope retried in the following election in 2008, and lost again to Conroy.

Pope was a member of The Wish List, a political action committee dedicated to electing pro-abortion rights Republican women into office.

== See also ==
- 1997-1998 Massachusetts legislature
- 1999-2000 Massachusetts legislature
- 2001-2002 Massachusetts legislature
- 2003-2004 Massachusetts legislature
- 2005-2006 Massachusetts legislature
