= John Larrabee =

American politician

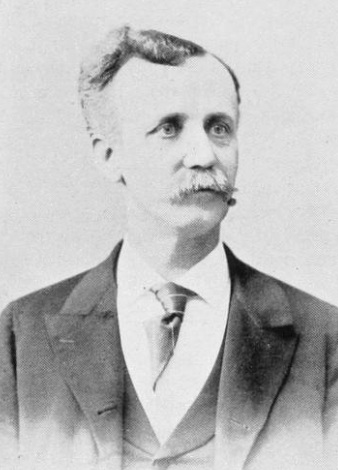

2nd Mayor of Melrose, Massachusetts
- In office January 1, 1901 – January 1903
- Preceded by: Levi S. Gould

City Treasurer City of Melrose, Massachusetts
- In office 1900–1900
- Preceded by: George Newhall
- Succeeded by: William R. Lavender

Town Clerk Town of Melrose, Massachusetts
- In office 1873–1894
- Preceded by: James Worthen
- Succeeded by: Edward K. Boardman

Member of the Massachusetts House of Representatives 11th Middlesex District
- In office 1886–1887
- Preceded by: John W. Farwell
- Succeeded by: William E. Barrett

Member of the Massachusetts House of Representatives 11th Middlesex District
- In office 1883–1883

Personal details
- Born: April 21, 1850 Melrose, Massachusetts
- Died: January 8, 1929 Melrose, Massachusetts
- Party: Republican
- Spouse(s): L. Ellen Ricker; M. Edna Atkins
- Children: John Heber Larrabee; Sarah Helen Larrabee; Harold Atkins Larrabee
- Profession: Pharmacist and in Banking

John Larrabee (April 21, 1850 – January 8, 1929) was an American pharmacist and politician, who served as the second mayor of Melrose, Massachusetts. He was also a member of the Massachusetts State legislature.

== End notes ==
Political offices
Preceded by Levi S. Gould	Mayor of Melrose, Massachusetts; January 1, 1901 – January 1903	Succeeded by
