= Paul H. Provandie =

American physician and politician (1875-1931)

Paul Hector Provandie

Mayor of Melrose, Massachusetts
- Preceded by: Angier Goodwin
- Succeeded by: Albert M. Tibbetts
- In office January 2, 1923 – 1925

Personal details
- Born: February 25, 1875
- Died: April 1931 (aged 55–56) Melrose, Massachusetts
- Profession: Physician

Paul Hector Provandie (1875-1931) was an American physician and politician, who served as the mayor of Melrose, Massachusetts.

Political offices
Preceded by Angier Goodwin	Mayor of Melrose, Massachusetts; January 2, 1923	Succeeded by Albert M. Tibbetts
