= Susan Schur =

American politician

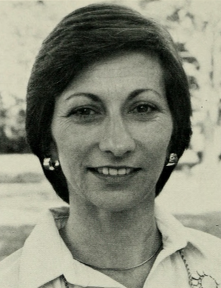

Member of the Massachusetts House of Representatives from the 12th Middlesex district
- In office 1981–1995

Susan L. Schur is an American Democratic politician from Newton, Massachusetts. She represented the 12th Middlesex district in the Massachusetts House of Representatives from 1981 to 1995.

== See also ==
- 1981-1982 Massachusetts legislature
