= Edward G. Connolly =

American politician

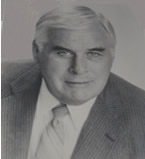

Member of the Massachusetts House of Representatives from the 28th Middlesex District
- In office 2003–2006
- Preceded by: Jarrett Barrios
- Succeeded by: Stephen Stat Smith

Member of the Massachusetts House of Representatives from the 20th Middlesex District
- In office 1991–2003
- Preceded by: George Keverian
- Succeeded by: Paul C. Casey

Mayor of Everett, Massachusetts
- In office 1979–1986
- Preceded by: William A. Apruzzese (Acting)
- Succeeded by: John R. McCarthy

Personal details
- Born: August 22, 1928 Everett, Massachusetts
- Died: May 25, 2006 (aged 77) Everett, Massachusetts
- Resting place: Glenwood Cemetery; Everett, Massachusetts
- Party: Democratic
- Education: Boston University; Boston State College
- Occupation: Public Relations; Politician

Edward G. "Sonny" Connolly (August 22, 1928 – May 25, 2006) was an American politician who was Mayor of Everett, Massachusetts and a member of the Massachusetts House of Representatives.

== Early life ==
Connolly was born on 22 August 1928 in Everett. He attended Everett public schools, Boston University, and Boston State College.

== Political career ==
Connolly was a member of the Everett Common Council for 21 years and was the body's president for one. He then served on the board of aldermen for nine years and was president for two years. From 1979 to 1986 he was Everett's mayor.

In 1990 he was elected to the Massachusetts House of Representatives, a position he held until his death on 25 May 2006. His funeral was held on Wednesday, 31 May 2006.
