= Susan Fargo =

American politician (1942–2019)

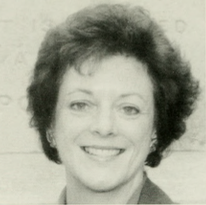

Member of the Massachusetts Senate
- In office 1997–2012
- Preceded by: Lucile P. Hicks
- Succeeded by: Michael J. Barrett
- Constituency: Fifth Middlesex (1997–2003); Third Middlesex (2003–2012)

Personal details
- Born: August 27, 1942 Peoria, Illinois, U.S.
- Died: November 15, 2019 (aged 77) Lincoln, Massachusetts, U.S.
- Party: Democratic
- Spouse: Foster M. Fargo Jr.

Susan Cooley Fargo (August 27, 1942 – November 15, 2019) was an American politician from the state of Massachusetts. She was elected to the 5th Middlesex District in the Massachusetts State Senate in 1997, and later elected to the 3rd Middlesex District in 2003. Prior to serving in the Massachusetts legislature, she was a public management professional who served on the Lincoln Board of Selectmen and the Middlesex executive committee.

Fargo co-chaired the Committee on Public Health during her time in the Massachusetts State Senate, and was known for her push to ban smoking in the workplace and enact tax credits for senior citizens. On February 10, 2012, Fargo announced that she would not seek a ninth term.

== Background ==
Fargo was born in Peoria, Illinois. She went to Stephens College before receiving her bachelor's degree from Northwestern University. Fargo obtained two master's degree from Harvard: one from the Harvard Graduate School of Education and one from the John F. Kennedy School of Government.

Fargo died on November 15, 2019, at the age of 77.

Massachusetts Senate
Preceded by Lucille Hicks	Member of the Massachusetts Senate from the 5th Middlesex district 1997–2003	Succeeded by Constituency abolished
Preceded by Richard Tisei	Member of the Massachusetts Senate from the 3rd Middlesex district 2003–2012	Succeeded by Michael J. Barrett
