= Tom Conroy =

American politician

Member of the Massachusetts House of Representatives from the 13th Middlesex district district
- In office 2007 – January 7, 2015
- Preceded by: Susan W. Pope
- Succeeded by: Carmine Gentile

Personal details
- Born: July 7, 1962 (age 64) New York City, U.S.
- Party: Democratic
- Spouse: Sarah Sewall
- Children: 4
- Education: Yale University (BA); Johns Hopkins University (MA); Boston University (MBA)

Thomas P. Conroy (born July 7, 1962) is an American politician who served as a member of the Massachusetts House of Representatives for the 13th Middlesex district from 2007 to 2015.

== Early life and education ==
Conroy was born in New York City, New York, and raised in Cheshire, Connecticut. His father was a doctor and his mother was a nurse. In 1980 he enrolled in Yale College, where he received a Bachelor of Arts degree in Russian and East European studies. He later earned a Master of Arts in international economics from Johns Hopkins University and a Master of Business Administration in finance from Boston University.

== Career ==
Conroy worked for Senator Gary Hart (D-CO), and served as a foreign policy and national security assistant for Senator Barbara Mikulski (D-MD). He spent a decade working for the United States State Department, where he managed refugee-resettlement programs in Southeast Asia and Haiti. For sixteen years he worked for a number of consulting firms, where he assisted nonprofits and businesses develop financial and operational strategies.

In 2006, Conroy was to the Massachusetts House of Representatives for the 13th Middlesex district. In the House, he served as vice chair of the Joint Committee on Health Care Financing and as the chairman of the Joint Committee on Labor & Workforce Development. Conroy also served as the House appointee to the Governor's Science, Technology, Engineering, and Mathematics (STEM) Advisory Council.

Conroy was a candidate for the Democratic nomination in the 2012 United States Senate election in Massachusetts, but withdrew from the race on December 12, 2011. He was a candidate for treasurer and receiver-general of Massachusetts in 2014, but lost to Deb Goldberg in the Democratic primary. He did not run for re-election to the House due to his run for treasurer; his term ended in January 2015.

== Post-government career ==
As of 2024, Conroy serves on the advisory board of the National Security Space Association.

== Personal life ==
Conroy is married to national security expert Sarah Sewall and has four daughters.
