= Massachusetts House of Representatives' 28th Middlesex district =

American legislative district

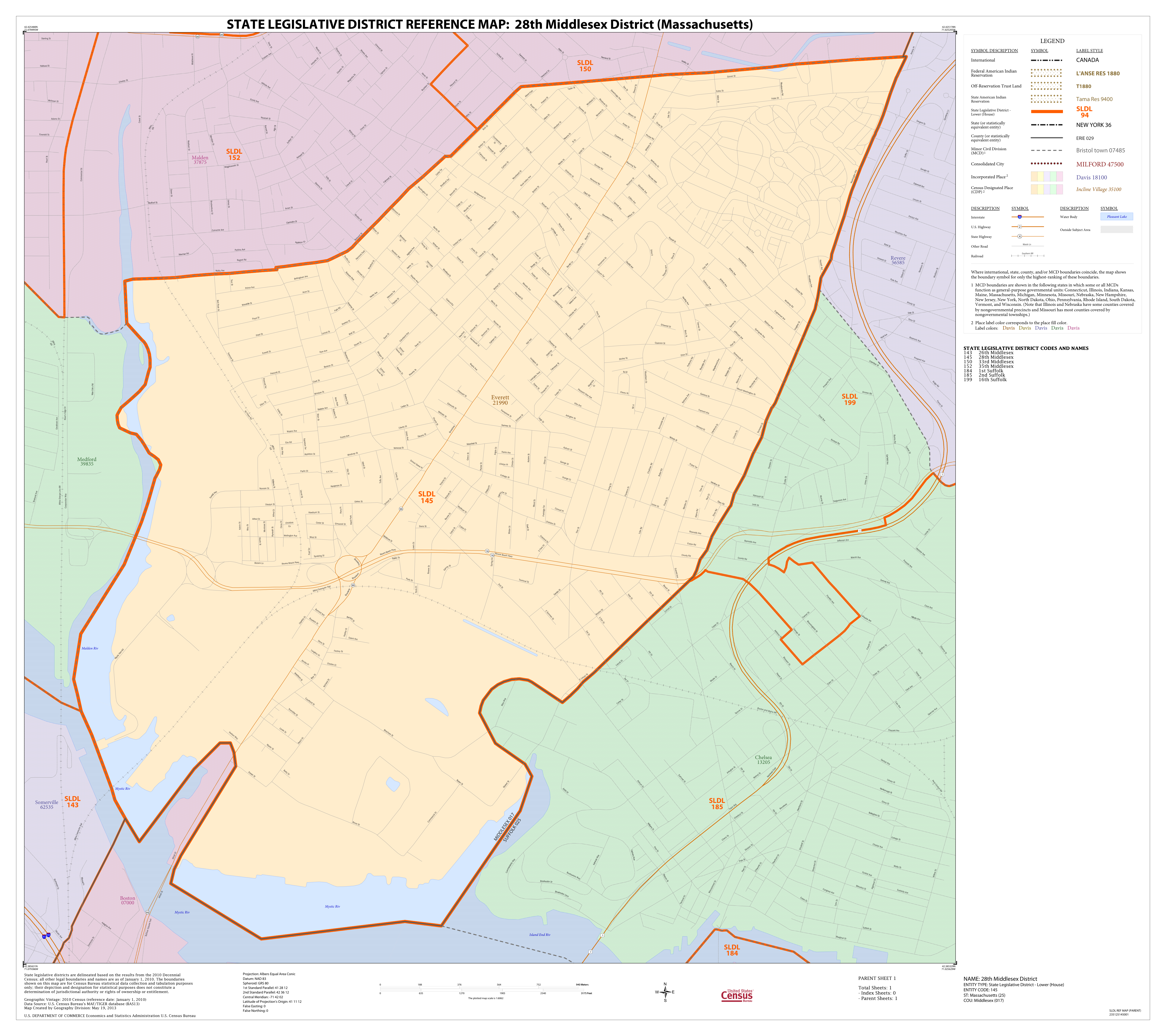
Map of Massachusetts House of Representatives' 28th Middlesex district, based on the 2010 United States census.

Massachusetts House of Representatives' 28th Middlesex district in the United States is one of 160 legislative districts included in the lower house of the Massachusetts General Court. It covers the city of Everett in Middlesex County. Since 2015, Joseph W. Mcgonagle, Jr. of the Democratic Party has represented the district.

The current district geographic boundary overlaps with that of the Massachusetts Senate's Middlesex and Suffolk district.

== Representatives ==
- Jarrett T. Barrios, 1998–2001
- Edward G. Connolly
- Stephen Stat Smith
- Wayne A. Matewsky
- Joseph W. Mcgonagle, Jr, 2015–current

== See also ==
- List of Massachusetts House of Representatives elections
- List of Massachusetts General Courts
- Other Middlesex County districts of the Massachusetts House of Representatives: 1st, 2nd, 3rd, 4th, 5th, 6th, 7th, 8th, 9th, 10th, 11th, 12th, 13th, 14th, 15th, 16th, 17th, 18th, 19th, 20th, 21st, 22nd, 23rd, 24th, 25th, 26th, 27th, 29th, 30th, 31st, 32nd, 33rd, 34th, 35th, 36th, 37th
- List of former districts of the Massachusetts House of Representatives

== Images ==
Portraits of legislators

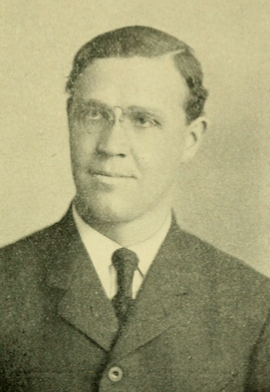
Charles Brown

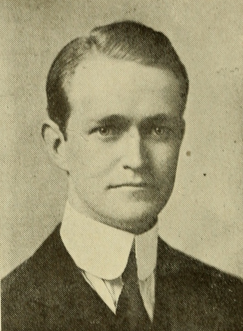
Jay Rogers Benton

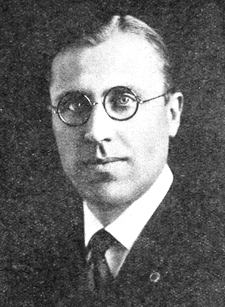
Joseph Russell Cotton

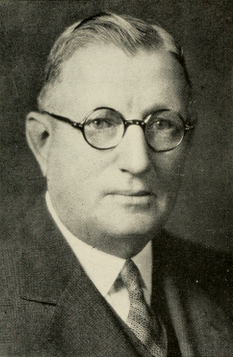
Nelson Crosby

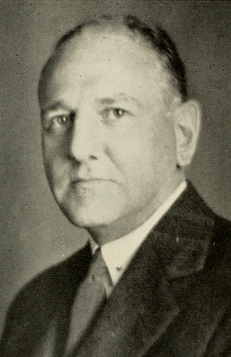
Hollis Gott

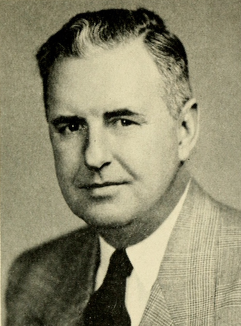
Henry Keenan

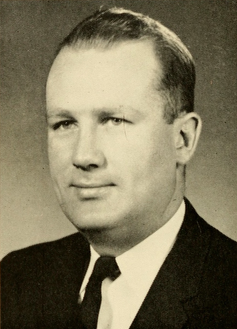
Edward Dever

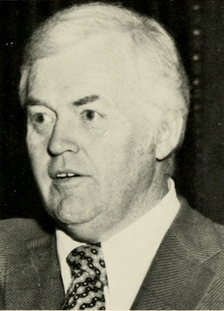
William Robinson

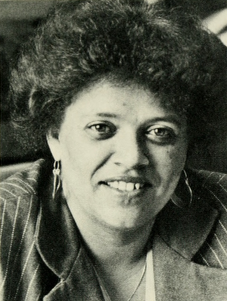
Saundra Graham

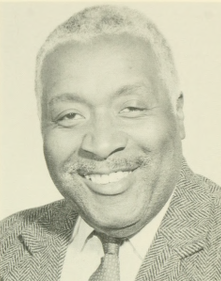
Alvin Thompson

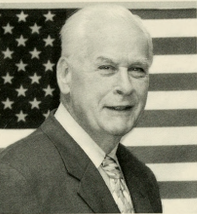
Edward Connolly
