= Paul A. Brodeur =

American politician

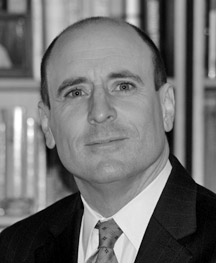

Mayor of Melrose, Massachusetts
- In office November 15, 2019 – January 8, 2024
- Preceded by: Gail M. Infurna
- Succeeded by: Jennifer (Jen) Grigoraitis

Member of the Massachusetts House of Representatives from the 32nd Middlesex district
- In office January 5, 2011 – November 15, 2019
- Preceded by: Katherine Clark
- Succeeded by: Kate Lipper-Garabedian

Personal details
- Born: April 24, 1964 (age 62) Massachusetts
- Party: Democratic
- Spouse: Elizabeth
- Children: 2
- Education: Lafayette College (B.A.); Suffolk University Law School (J.D.)
- Occupation: Attorney

Paul A. Brodeur (born April 24, 1964) was the mayor of Melrose, Massachusetts. Previously, he was a state legislator in the Massachusetts House of Representatives, representing the 32nd Middlesex district.
