= Massachusetts House of Representatives' 12th Middlesex district =

American legislative district

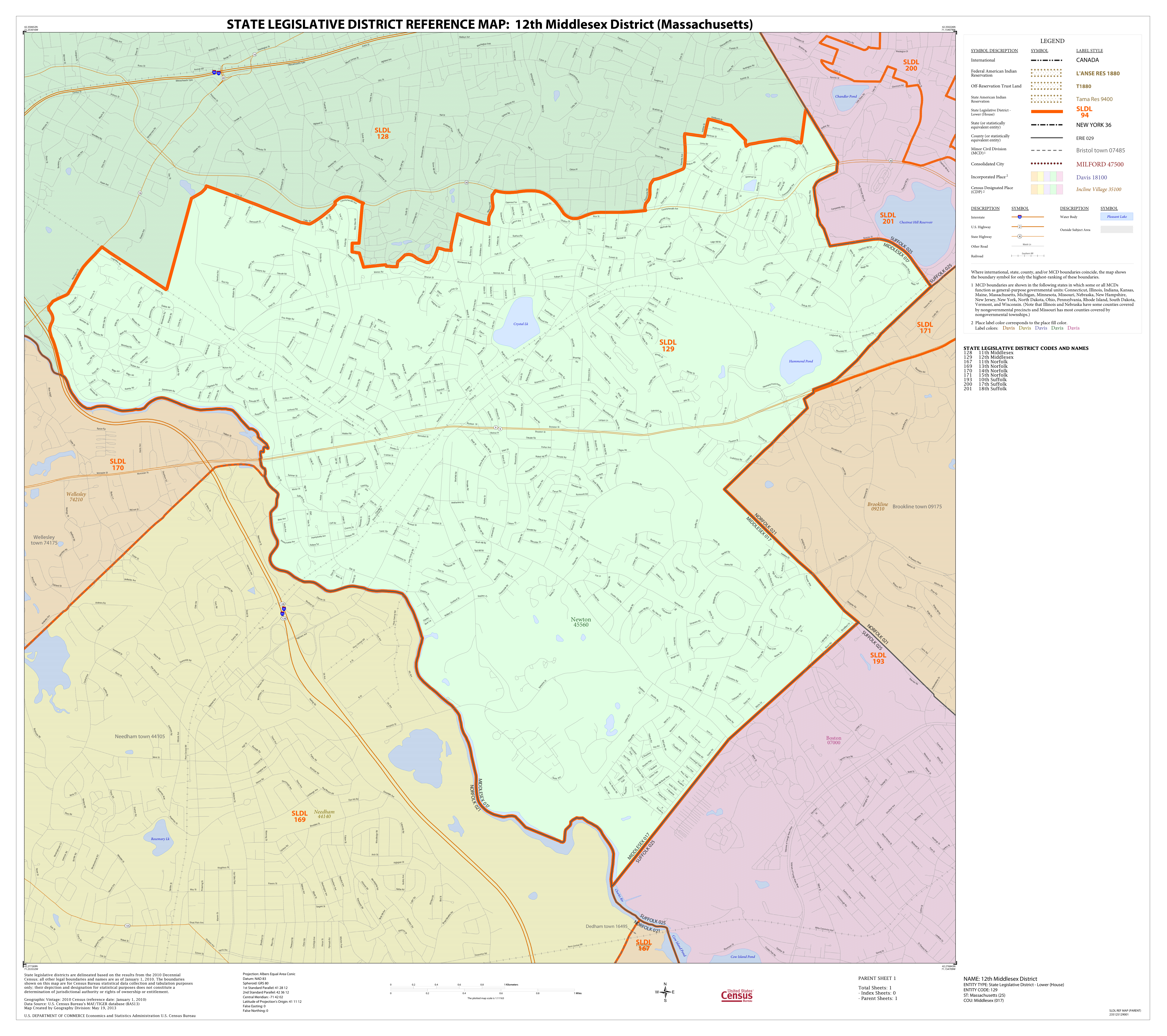
Map of Massachusetts House of Representatives' 12th Middlesex district, based on the 2010 United States census.

Massachusetts House of Representatives' 12th Middlesex district in the United States is one of 160 legislative districts included in the lower house of the Massachusetts General Court. It covers part of the city of Newton in Middlesex County. Democrat Greg Schwartz has represented the district since 2025.

The current district geographic boundary overlaps with that of the Massachusetts Senate's 1st Middlesex and Norfolk district.

== Representatives ==
- Laurin Leland, circa 1858
- Nathaniel Dowse, circa 1859
- James E. Whitcher, circa 1888
- Howard B. White, circa 1920
- Earle S. Bagley, circa 1951
- Robert A. Manzelli, circa 1975
- Ruth B. Balser, 2003–2025
- Greg Schwartz, 2025–Present

== Former locale ==
The district previously covered Waltham, circa 1872.

== See also ==
- List of Massachusetts House of Representatives elections
- List of Massachusetts General Courts
- List of former districts of the Massachusetts House of Representatives
- Other Middlesex County districts of the Massachusetts House of Representatives: 1st, 2nd, 3rd, 4th, 5th, 6th, 7th, 8th, 9th, 10th, 11th, 13th, 14th, 15th, 16th, 17th, 18th, 19th, 20th, 21st, 22nd, 23rd, 24th, 25th, 26th, 27th, 28th, 29th, 30th, 31st, 32nd, 33rd, 34th, 35th, 36th, 37th

== Images ==
Portraits of legislators

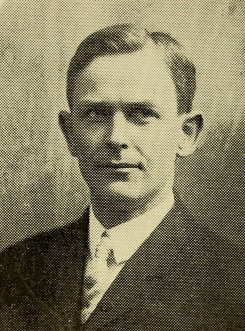
Frank Torrey

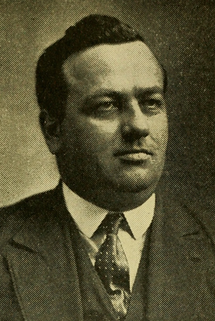
Robert Holden

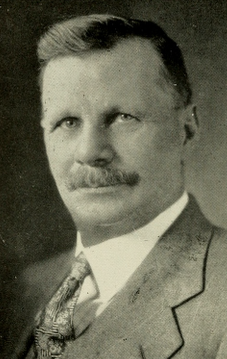
James Kendall

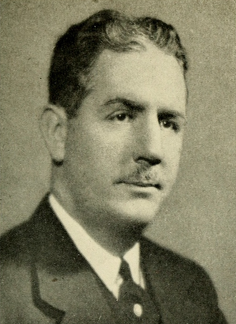
Earle Bagley

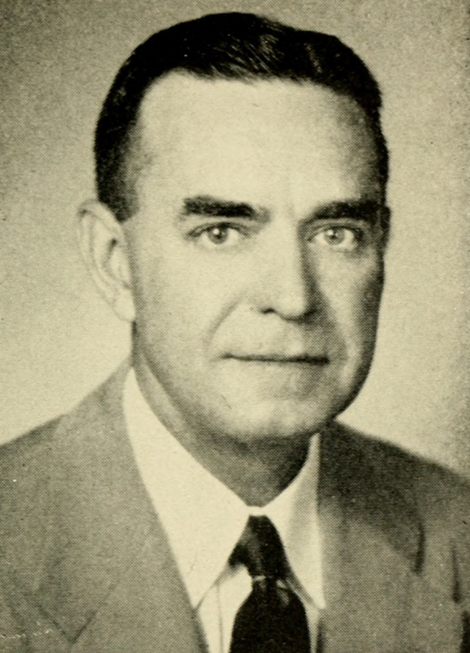
Chester Waterous

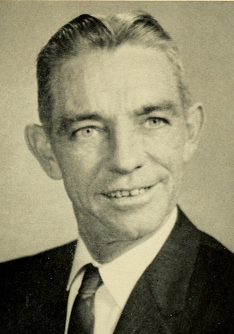
Felix Perrault

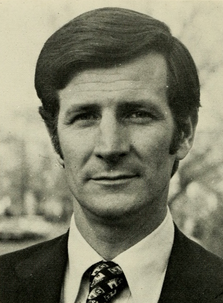
Robert Manzelli

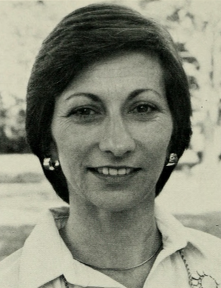
Susan Schur

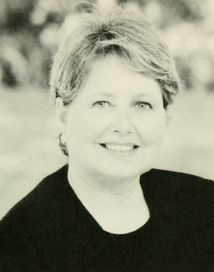
Kay Khan

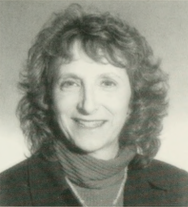
Ruth Balser
