= Marie E. Howe =

American politician (1939–2024)

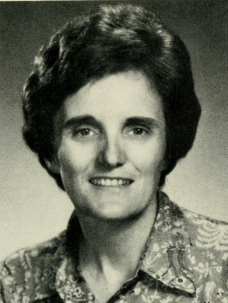
- Howe in 1983

Member of the Massachusetts House of Representatives from the 31st Middlesex district
- In office 1965–1988

Personal details
- Born: June 13, 1939
- Died: December 2, 2024 (aged 85)
- Party: Democratic
- Occupation: Politician

Marie Elizabeth Howe (June 13, 1939 – December 2, 2024) was an American politician who served in the Massachusetts House of Representatives from 1965 to 1988, representing the 31st Middlesex district of Massachusetts as a Democrat.

== Career ==
Howe served in the Massachusetts House of Representatives from 1965 to 1988, representing the 31st Middlesex district of Massachusetts as a Democrat.

In 1972, Howe offered two resolutions that called for President Richard Nixon to "use the full weight and power" of his office to immediately withdraw British troops from six counties in Northern Ireland and urged the United States government to protest the political division of Ireland. When Howe took the floor to speak, she was interrupted by members of the Irish Republican Aid Committee, who were then escorted out by court officers.

In 1985, Howe cosponsored a proposal to increase the basic welfare payment to a mother with two children from $388 to $415 a month.

== Personal life and death ==
Howe resided in Somerville, Massachusetts. She died on December 2, 2024, at the age of 85.

== See also ==
- 1965–1966 Massachusetts legislature

Massachusetts House of Representatives
Preceded by —	Member of the Massachusetts House of Representatives from the 31st Middlesex district 1965–1988	Succeeded by —
