= Carl A. Raymond =

Mayor of Melrose, Massachusetts
- In office 1941–1947
- Preceded by: Robert A. Perkins
- Succeeded by: Thomas L. Thistle

Budget Commissioner of Massachusetts
- In office 1928–1940
- Preceded by: Charles P. Howard
- Succeeded by: Charles W. Greenough

Personal details
- Born: 1876 Westminster, Massachusetts
- Died: March 8, 1963 (aged 86) Melrose, Massachusetts

Carl A. Raymond (1876–1963) was an American government official who served as budget commissioner of Massachusetts from 1928 to 1940 and mayor of Melrose, Massachusetts, from 1941 to 1947.

== Early career ==
Raymond was born in Westminster, Massachusetts, in 1876. His father, Hobart Raymond, was a member of the Massachusetts House of Representatives in the 1893 Massachusetts legislature. In 1894, Raymond became page in the House of Representatives. Three years later he was appointed as the House's second assistant clerk. He also spent a dozen summers as an employee of the Massachusetts Highway Commission, starting as a rodman and rising to the position of resident engineer. During the Spanish–American War, Raymond served in the United States Volunteer Corps of Engineers.

== Deputy auditor ==
In 1912, Raymond was appointed second deputy state auditor. He was seen as the eventual successor to first deputy William D. Hawley, who was the chief advisor to the House and Senate committees on Ways and Means. He began to relieve Hawley of some of his duties and in 1917 took over his role on an acting basis when Hawley was incapacitated by illness. Due to Raymond's increased responsibilities, the state legislature sought to make Raymond's tenure nearly permanent, which went against the wishes Massachusetts State Auditor Alonzo B. Cook. The House of Representatives passed a bill that increased Raymond's salary and made his tenure of office dependent on the Governor of Massachusetts and the Massachusetts Governor's Council, not the auditor. Before the bill could be voted on by the Massachusetts Senate, Cook fired Raymond for going over his head to the legislature.

== Budget commissioner ==
Following Raymond's dismissal, commissioner of administration Charles E. Burbank nominated him for the position of deputy commissioner. In 1922, the department of administration was replaced by the department of administration and finance. Raymond served as the state's assistant budget commissioner until 1928, when the roles of commission chairman and budget commissioner were separated and Raymond was promoted to budget commissioner. In this role, Raymond oversaw the budget of every state department and had the ability to cut any expenditures he believed were unnecessary, which resulted in many new positions, projects, and buildings being canceled. Raymond retired as budget commissioner in 1940.

== Mayor of Melrose ==
Raymond served as mayor of Melrose, Massachusetts from 1941 to 1947. He continued the pay as you go policy adopted by his predecessor, Robert A. Perkins, and in 1948, due in large part to contributions made by Raymond, Melrose became the first debt-free municipality in Massachusetts. In 1947, Governor Robert F. Bradford appointed Raymond to chair a commission tasked with studying fiscal relations between the state and municipalities and to look into potential sources of revenue. Raymond died on March 8, 1963, at the age of 86.
