= Massachusetts House of Representatives' 6th Middlesex district =

American legislative district

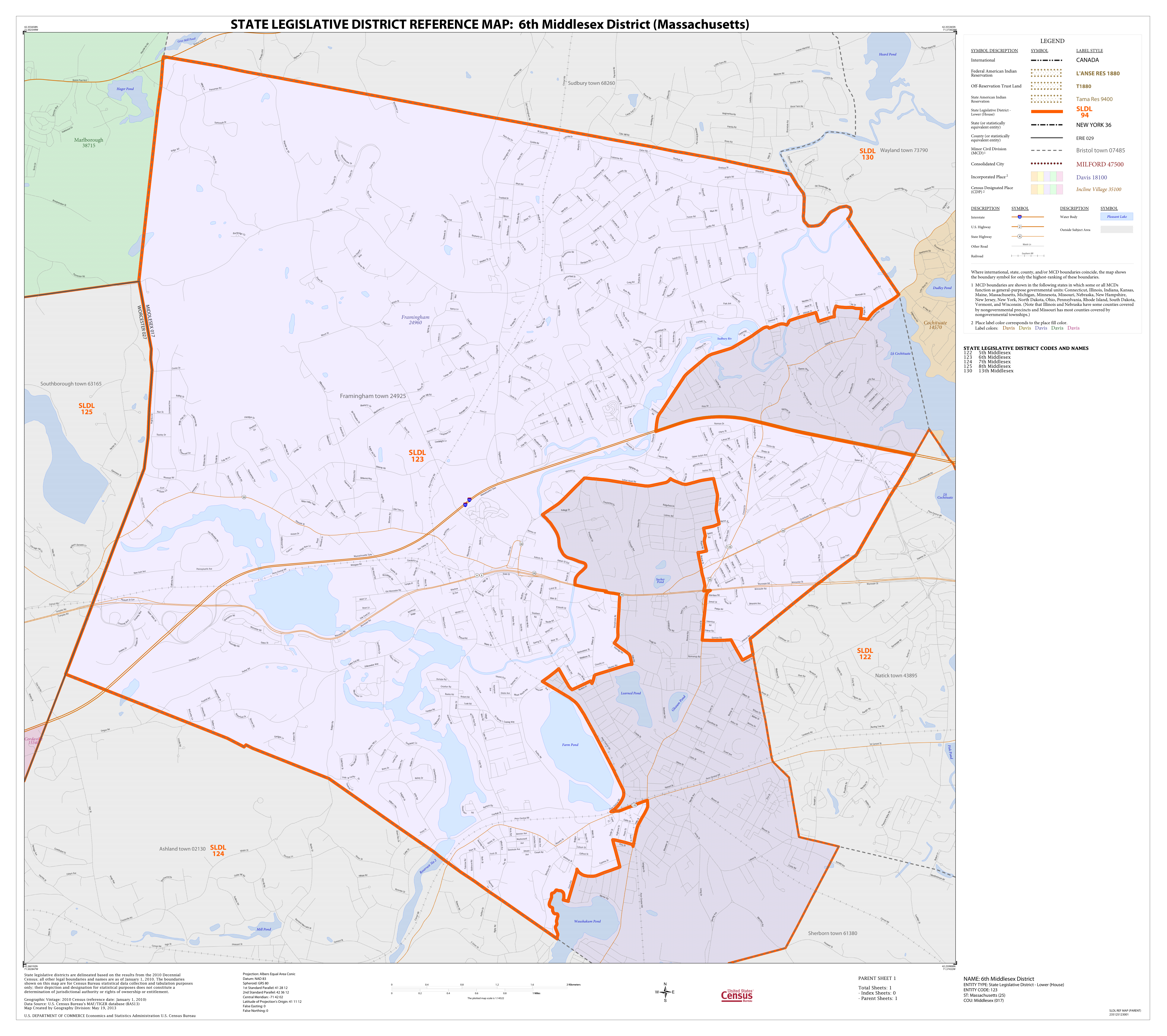
Map of Massachusetts House of Representatives' 6th Middlesex district, based on the 2010 United States census.

Massachusetts House of Representatives' 6th Middlesex district in the United States is one of 160 legislative districts included in the lower house of the Massachusetts General Court. It covers part of the city of Framingham in Middlesex County. Democrat Priscila Sousa of Framingham has represented the district since 2023.

The current district geographic boundary overlaps with that of the Massachusetts Senate's 2nd Middlesex and Norfolk district.

== Representatives ==
- Moses Proctor, circa 1858
- Oliver R. Clark, circa 1859
- Francis H. Raymond, circa 1888
- William J. Naphen, circa 1920
- H. Edward Snow, circa 1951
- Vincent Joseph Piro, circa 1975
- Barbara Gray, 1979 – 1996
- John H. Stasik, 1997 – 2000
- Deborah D. Blumer, 2001 – 2006
- Pam Richardson, 2007 – 2011
- Chris Walsh, 2010 – 2018
- Maria D. Robinson, 2019 – 2022
- Priscila Sousa, 2023 – current

== Former locales ==
The district previously covered:

- West Cambridge, circa 1872
- Winchester, circa 1872

== See also ==
- List of Massachusetts House of Representatives elections
- Other Middlesex County districts of the Massachusetts House of Representatives: 1st, 2nd, 3rd, 4th, 5th, 7th, 8th, 9th, 10th, 11th, 12th, 13th, 14th, 15th, 16th, 17th, 18th, 19th, 20th, 21st, 22nd, 23rd, 24th, 25th, 26th, 27th, 28th, 29th, 30th, 31st, 32nd, 33rd, 34th, 35th, 36th, 37th
- List of Massachusetts General Courts
- List of former districts of the Massachusetts House of Representatives

== Images ==
Portraits of legislators

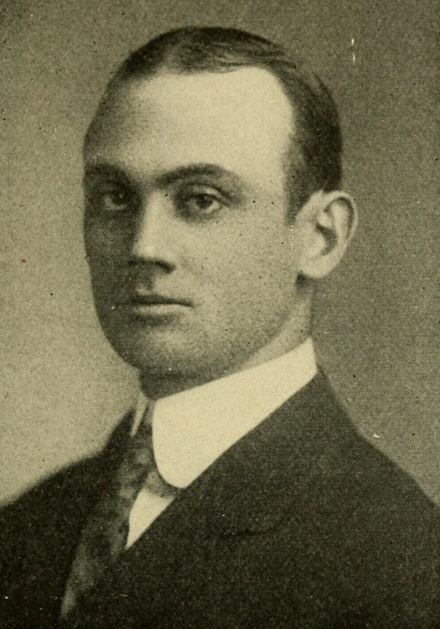
Martin Hall

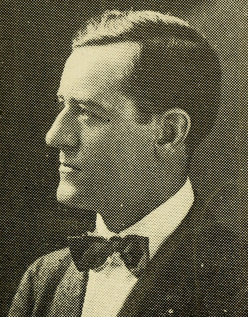
Robert Shaw Corrigan

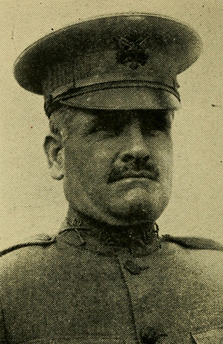
Jeremiah Healey

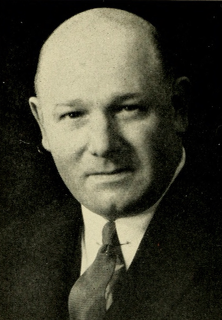
C. Ray Bennett

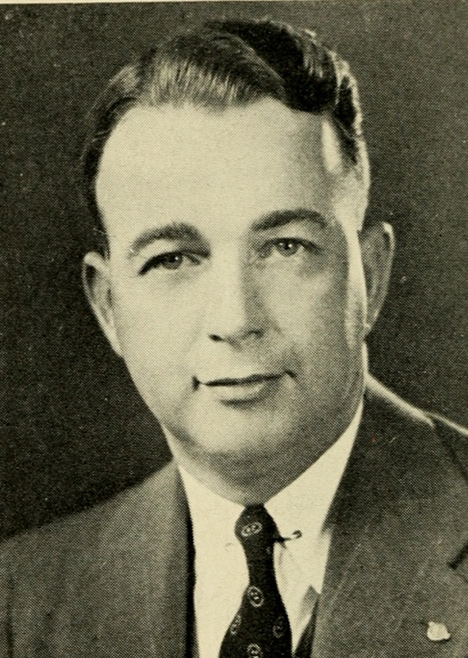
H. Edward Snow

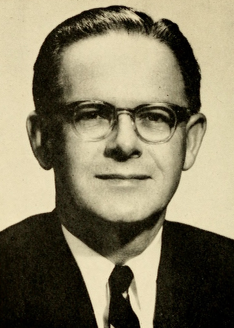
Walter Burke

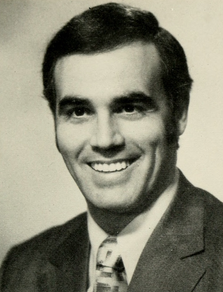
Vincent Piro

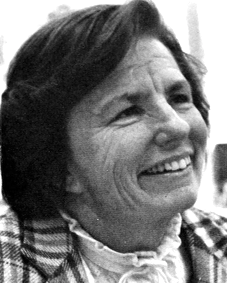
Barbara Gray

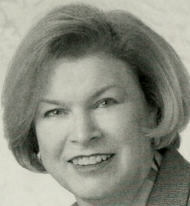
Deborah Blumer
