= Pam Richardson =

American politician

Member of the Massachusetts House of Representatives from the 6th Middlesex district
- In office 2007–2011

Pam Richardson is an American Democratic politician from Framingham, Massachusetts. She represented the 6th Middlesex district in the Massachusetts House of Representatives from 2007 to 2011.

== See also ==
- 2007–2008 Massachusetts legislature
- 2009–2010 Massachusetts legislature
