= Charles H. Adams (Massachusetts journalist) =

American journalist and politician (1859-1952)

Charles Henry Adams
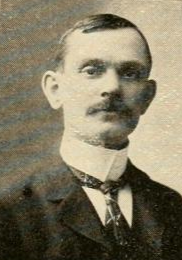

Mayor of Melrose, Massachusetts

Member of the Massachusetts House of Representatives 31st Middlesex District

Personal details
- Born: April 22, 1859 Rochester, New Hampshire
- Died: June 5, 1952 (aged 93)
- Party: Republican
- Profession: Journalist

Charles Henry Adams (April 22, 1859 – June 5, 1952) was an American journalist and politician, who represented the 31st Middlesex District in the Massachusetts House of Representatives from 1900 to 1903, and served as the mayor of Melrose, Massachusetts between 1915 and 1921.

Adams was the publisher of the Melrose Journal, and assistant business manager of The Boston Advertiser and The Boston Evening Record.

== End notes ==
Political offices
Preceded by	Mayor of Melrose, Massachusetts	Succeeded by
