= Ann Cole Gannett =

American politician

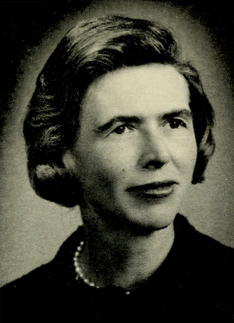
- Portrait of Gannett from 1969.

Member of the Massachusetts House of Representatives from the 13th Middlesex district
- In office 1978–1980

Member of the Massachusetts House of Representatives from the 53rd Middlesex district
- In office 1974–1978

Member of the Massachusetts House of Representatives from the 38th Middlesex district
- In office 1970–1974

Personal details
- Born: Ann Cole; September 15, 1997 Brookline, Massachusetts, United States
- Died: September 15, 1997 (aged 80) Boston, Massachusetts, United States
- Party: Republican
- Spouse: Thomas Brattle Gannett Sr.
- Children: 5
- Parent(s): Ann Sheafe; Benjamin E. Cole
- Education: Vassar College

Ann Cole Gannett (November 7, 1916 – September 15, 1997) was an American politician from Wayland, Massachusetts. Gannett represented the former 38th Middlesex and 53rd Middlesex districts, as well as the 13th Middlesex district, in the Massachusetts House of Representatives from 1970 to 1980.

== Career ==
Born to Ann Sheafe and Benjamin E. Cole in Brookline, Gannett graduated from Abbot Academy in Andover in 1933, and then from Vassar College in Poughkeepsie in 1937.

In 1970, Gannett won an uncontested seat in the 38th Middlesex district of the Massachusetts House of Representatives. Four years later, she was elected to the 53rd Middlesex district, defeating Douglas A. Miranda of Sudbury. In 1978, Gannett won the 13th Middlesex seat against Dennis J. Berry, also of Wayland. She held the post until 1980.

On September 15, 1997, Gannett died of heart failure in the Jamaica Plain neighborhood of Boston, Massachusetts.

== See also ==
- 1969-1970 Massachusetts legislature
- 1971-1972 Massachusetts legislature
- 1973-1974 Massachusetts legislature
- 1975-1976 Massachusetts legislature
- 1977-1978 Massachusetts legislature
- 1979-1980 Massachusetts legislature
- List of Vassar College people
