= Massachusetts House of Representatives' 11th Middlesex district =

American legislative district

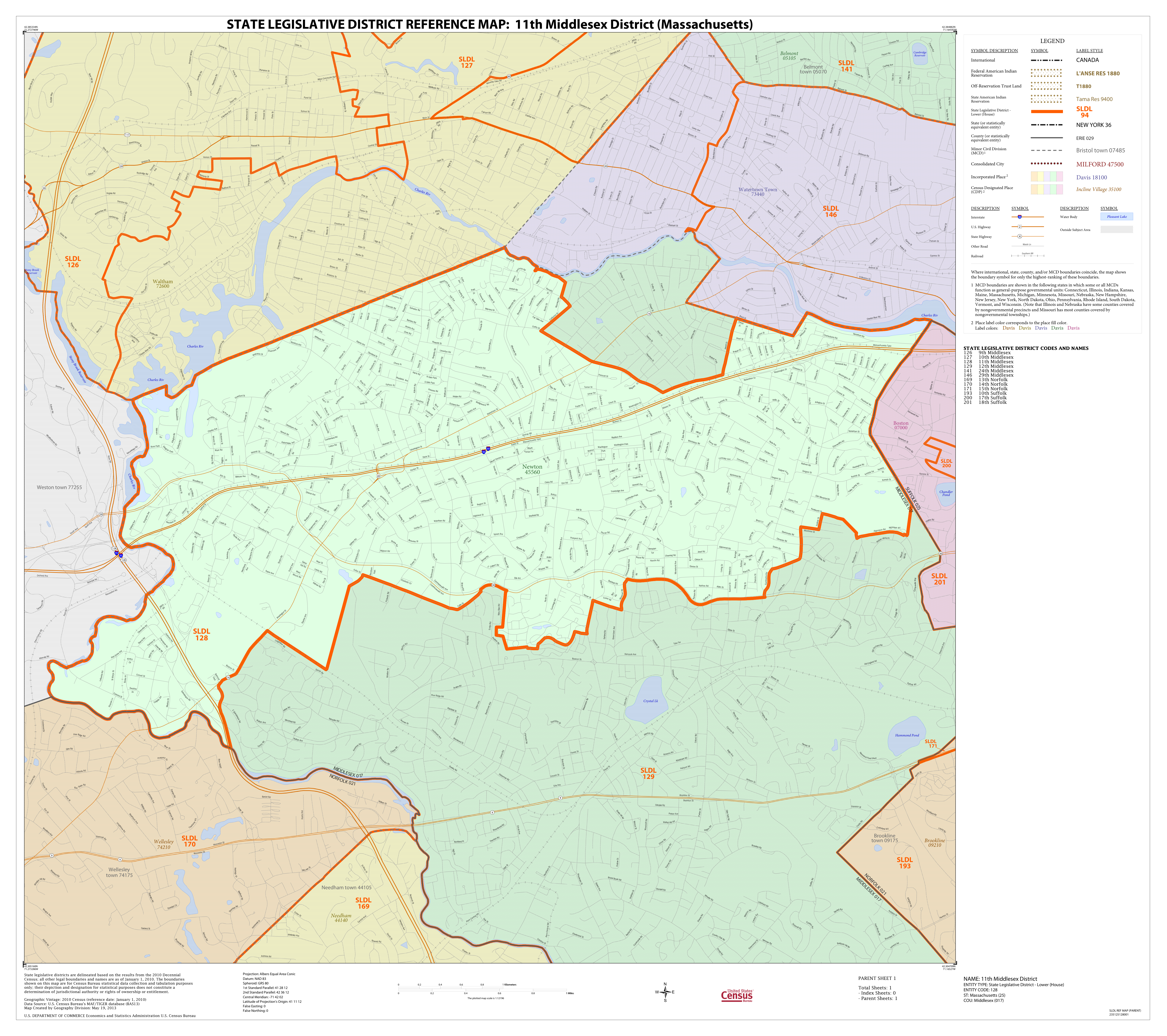
Map of Massachusetts House of Representatives' 11th Middlesex district, based on the 2010 United States census.

Massachusetts House of Representatives' 11th Middlesex district in the United States is one of 160 legislative districts included in the lower house of the Massachusetts General Court. It covers part of the city of Newton in Middlesex County. Democrat Mah Sangiolo has represented the district since 2025.

The current district geographic boundary overlaps with that of the Massachusetts Senate's 1st Middlesex & Norfolk district.

== Representatives ==
- Franklin Hanchett, circa 1858
- Benjamin F. Ham, circa 1859
- William E. Barrett, circa 1888
- James H. Wilkins, circa 1920
- Edward Joseph Desaulnier, Jr., circa 1951
- Edward F. Galotti, circa 1975
- David B. Cohen, 1979–1997
- Kay Khan, 2003–2025
- Mah Sangiolo, 2025–present

== Former locales ==
The district previously covered:

- Belmont, circa 1872
- Watertown, circa 1872

== See also ==
- List of Massachusetts House of Representatives elections
- List of Massachusetts General Courts
- List of former districts of the Massachusetts House of Representatives
- Other Middlesex County districts of the Massachusetts House of Representatives: 1st, 2nd, 3rd, 4th, 5th, 6th, 7th, 8th, 9th, 10th, 12th, 13th, 14th, 15th, 16th, 17th, 18th, 19th, 20th, 21st, 22nd, 23rd, 24th, 25th, 26th, 27th, 28th, 29th, 30th, 31st, 32nd, 33rd, 34th, 35th, 36th, 37th

== Images ==
Portraits of legislators

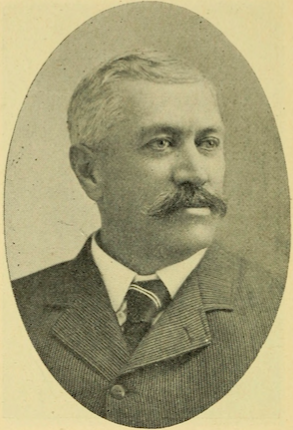
Edwin Perham

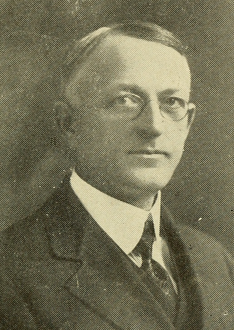
Walter Perham

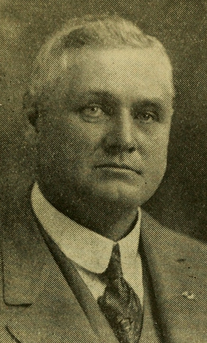
Fred Snow

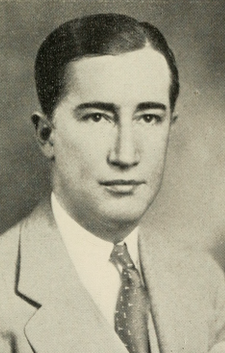
John Valentine

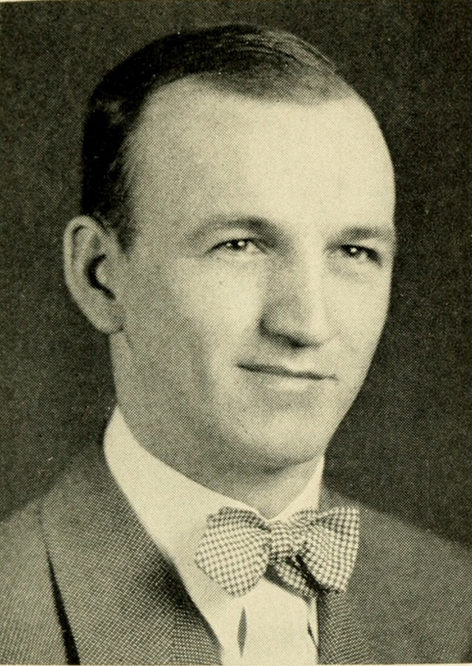
Edward Joseph DeSaulnier

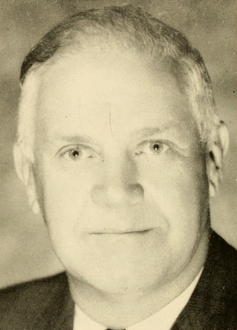
George Shattuck

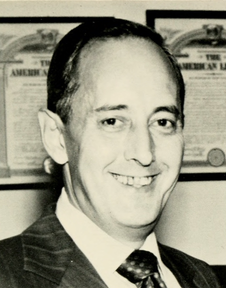
Edward Galotti

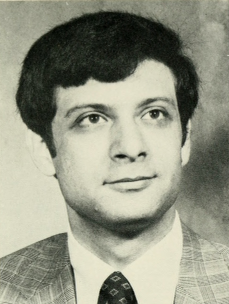
David Cohen

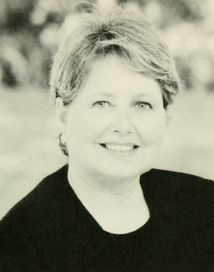
Kay Khan
