= Massachusetts House of Representatives' 13th Middlesex district =

American legislative district

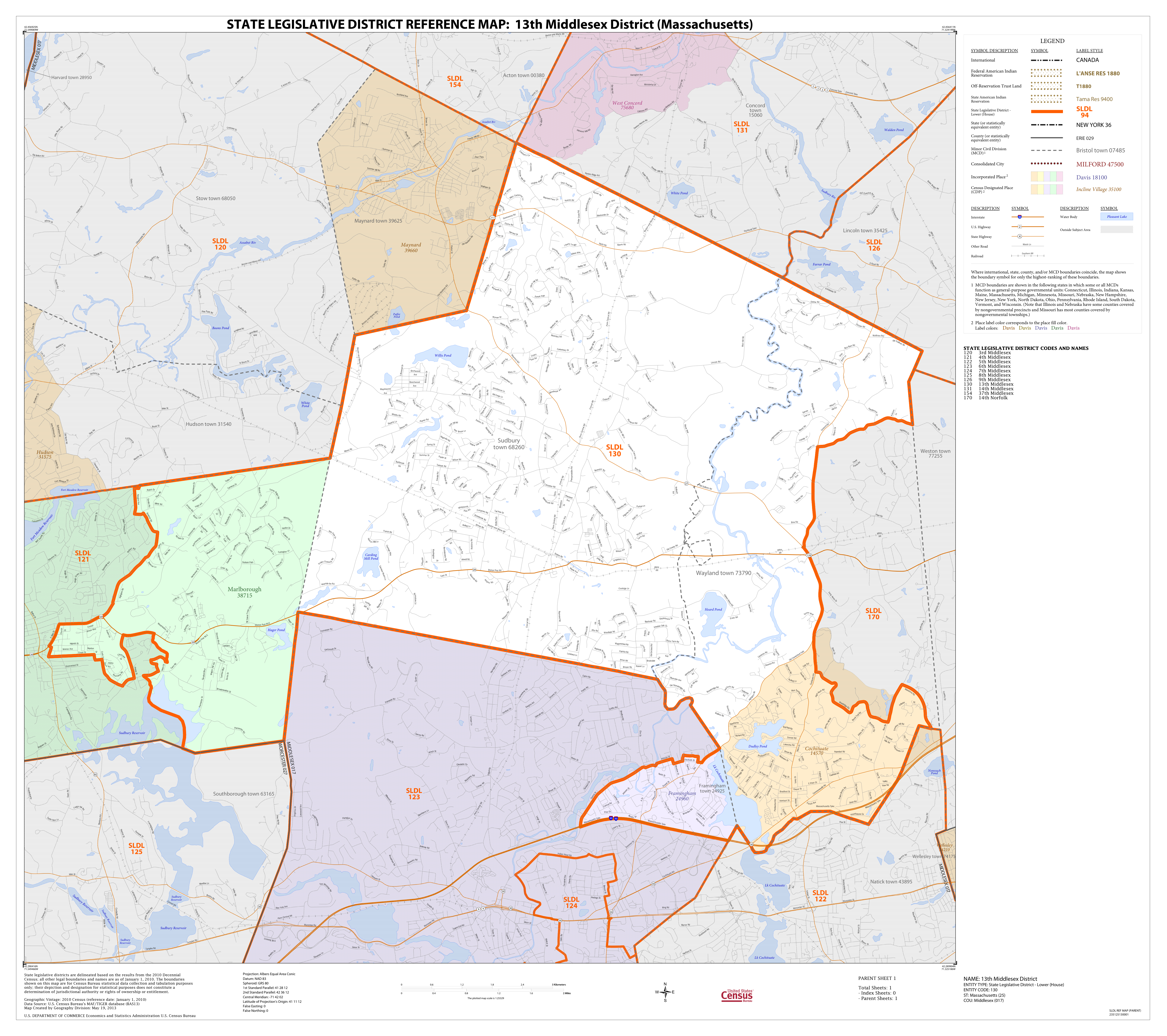
Map of Massachusetts House of Representatives' 13th Middlesex district, based on the 2010 United States census. A map based on the 2020 census is here

Massachusetts House of Representatives' 13th Middlesex district in the United States is one of 160 legislative districts included in the lower house of the Massachusetts General Court. It covers part of Middlesex County. Democrat Carmine Gentile of Sudbury has represented the district since 2015.

== Locales represented ==
After redistricting based on the 2020 census, the district includes the following localities:

- part of Concord
- part of Marlborough
- Sudbury
- part of Wayland
- part of Lincoln

The current district geographic boundary overlaps with those of the Massachusetts Senate's 2nd Middlesex and Norfolk district, 3rd Middlesex district, Middlesex and Worcester district, and Norfolk, Bristol and Middlesex district.

=== Former locale ===
The district previously covered Natick, circa 1872.

== Representatives ==
- Albert Wood, circa 1858
- William F. Ellis, circa 1859
- Charles Francis Woodward, circa 1888
- Alfred L. Cutting, circa 1908
- Winthrop H. Fairbank, 1910-1912
- Benjamin Loring Young, circa 1920
- George Tarbell, circa 1935
- Harold Tompkins, circa 1945
- David B. Williams, circa 1951
- John McGlennon, circa 1967
- Richard M. McGrath, circa 1975
- Ann Cole Gannett, 1978-1980
- Lucile P. Hicks, 1981-1990
- Nancy Hasty Evans, 1990-1996
- Susan W. Pope, 1997-2006
- Thomas P. Conroy
- Carmine Gentile, 2015-current

== See also ==
- List of Massachusetts House of Representatives elections
- List of Massachusetts General Courts
- List of former districts of the Massachusetts House of Representatives
- Other Middlesex County districts of the Massachusetts House of Representatives: 1st, 2nd, 3rd, 4th, 5th, 6th, 7th, 8th, 9th, 10th, 11th, 12th, 14th, 15th, 16th, 17th, 18th, 19th, 20th, 21st, 22nd, 23rd, 24th, 25th, 26th, 27th, 28th, 29th, 30th, 31st, 32nd, 33rd, 34th, 35th, 36th, 37th

== Images ==
Portraits of legislators

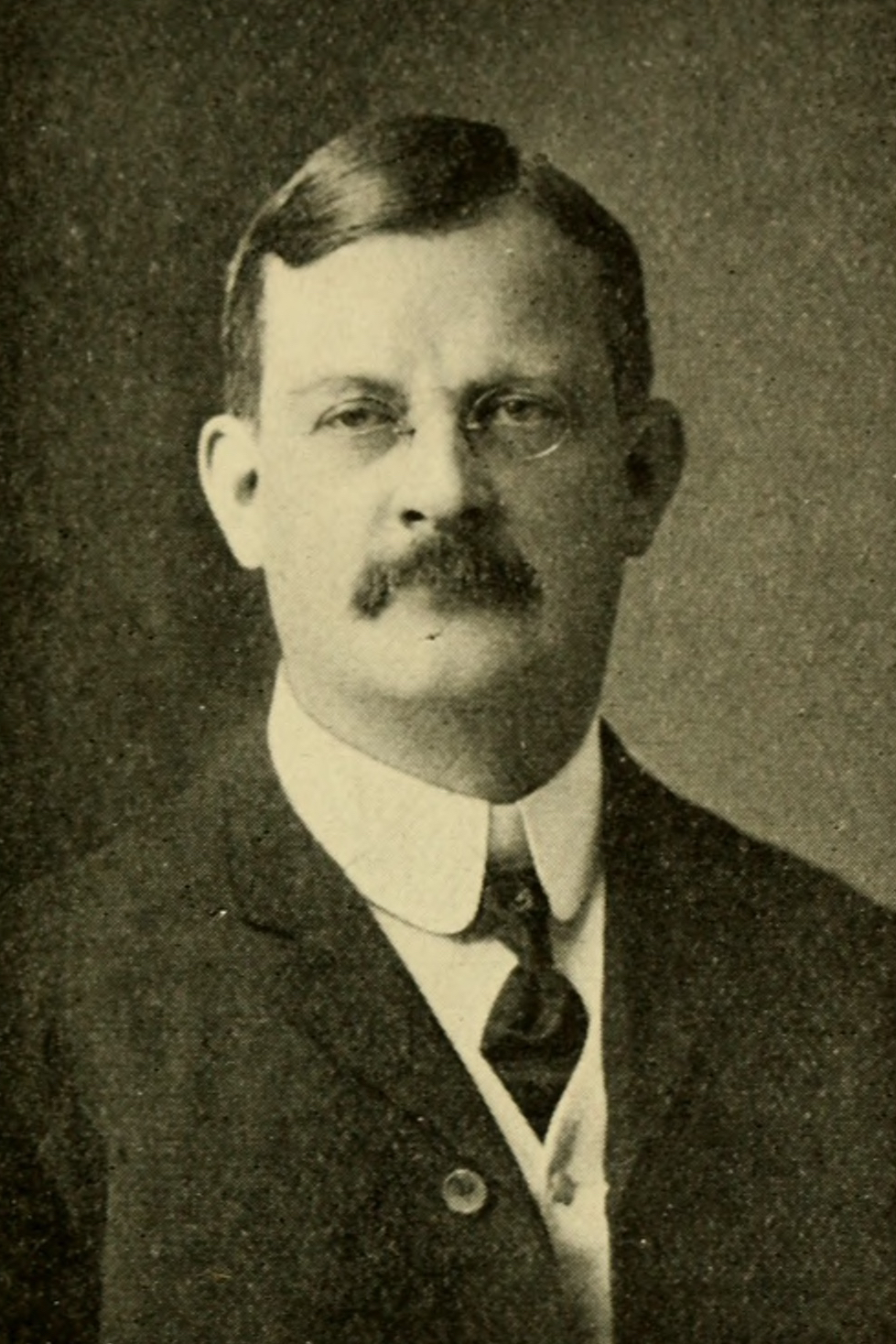
Alfred L. Cutting

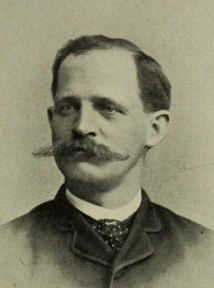
Winthrop H. Fairbank

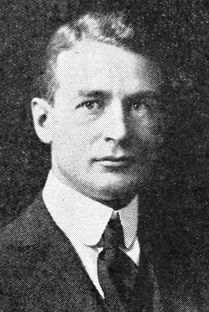
Benjamin Loring Young

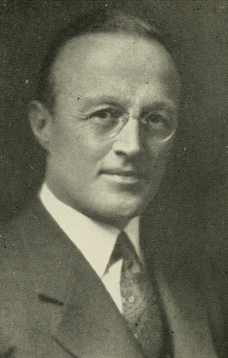
George Tarbell

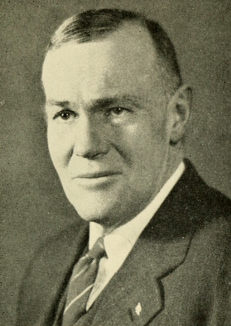
Harold Tompkins

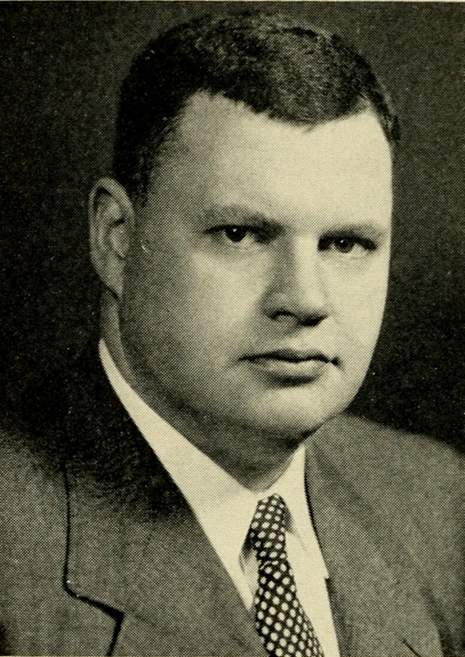
David B. Williams

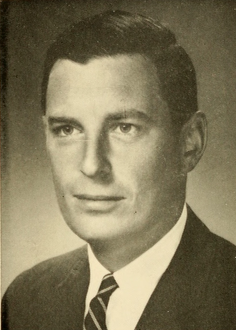
John McGlennon

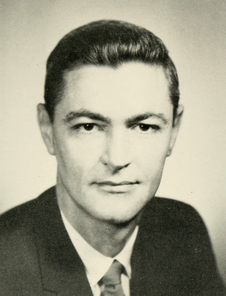
Richard M. McGrath

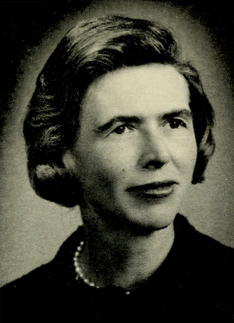
Ann Cole Gannett

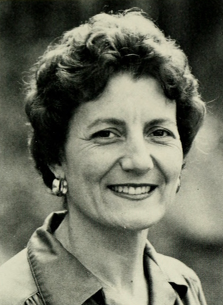
Lucile P. Hicks

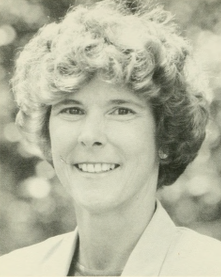
Nancy Hasty Evans

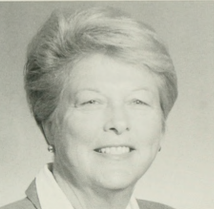
Susan W. Pope

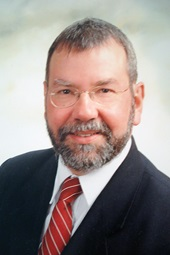
Carmine Gentile
