= Massachusetts House of Representatives' 31st Middlesex district =

American legislative district

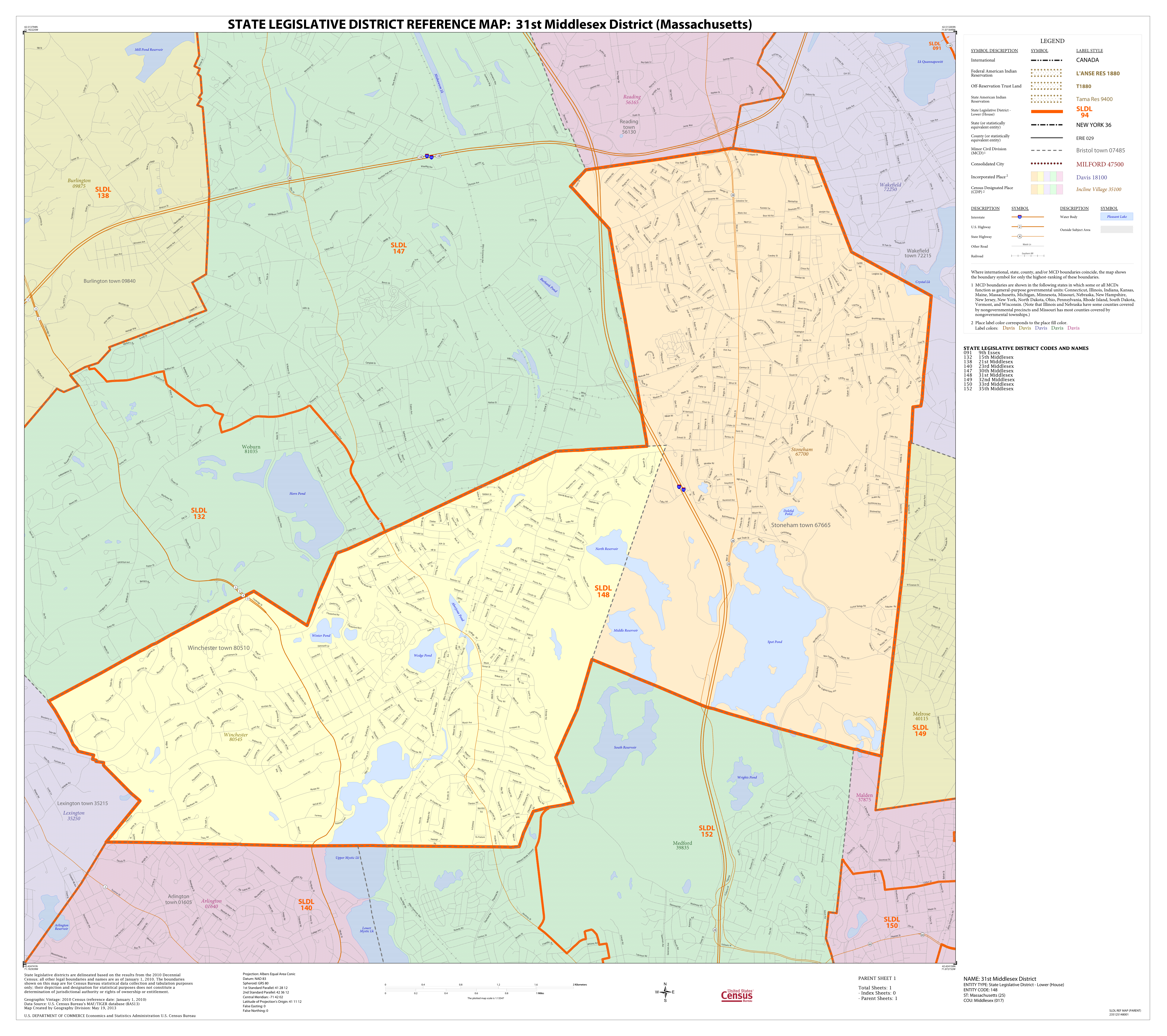
Map of Massachusetts House of Representatives' 31st Middlesex district, based on the 2010 United States census.

Massachusetts House of Representatives' 31st Middlesex district in the United States is one of 160 legislative districts included in the lower house of the Massachusetts General Court. It covers Stoneham and Winchester in Middlesex County. Since 2015, Michael Seamus Day of the Democratic Party has represented the district.

The current district geographic boundary overlaps with those of the Massachusetts Senate's 2nd Middlesex and 5th Middlesex districts.

Gov. Charlie Baker (R) signed the state's new legislative maps into law on November 4, 2021. After the redistricting plans were enacted, Massachusetts Secretary of State William Galvin (D) issued a statement expressing concern regarding how the maps would be implemented: "I am extremely disappointed that these bills were signed into law in their current form and I think it is a devastating blow to the voters of Massachusetts. With local precincts divided multiple ways, it will inevitably lead to chaos at the polls and make it impossible for voters to understand who their elected representatives are."

== Representatives ==
- James Jones
- Hugh Morgan
- Anthony Gallugi
- Marie Elizabeth Howe
- Edward Connolly
- Paul C. Casey
- Jason M. Lewis
- Michael Seamus Day, 2015–current

== See also ==
- List of Massachusetts House of Representatives elections
- List of Massachusetts General Courts
- List of former districts of the Massachusetts House of Representatives

== Images ==
Portraits of legislators

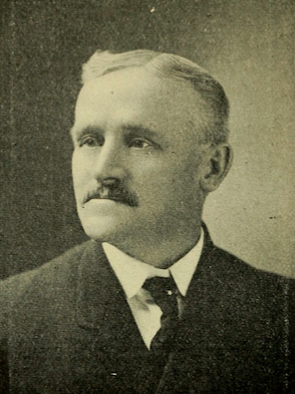
James Jones

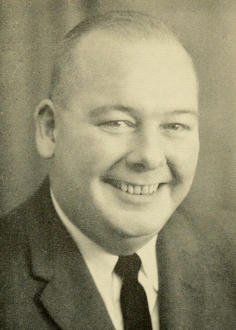
Hugh Morgan

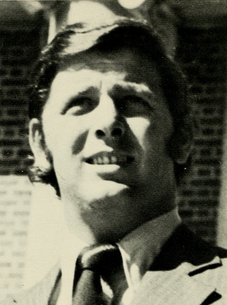
Anthony Gallugi

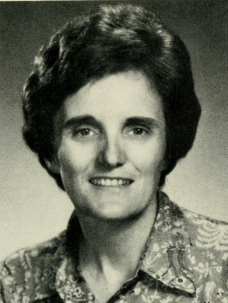
Marie E. Howe

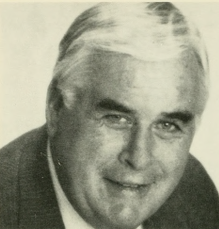
Edward Connolly

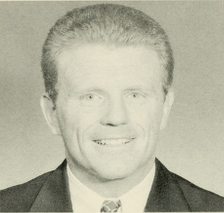
Paul Casey

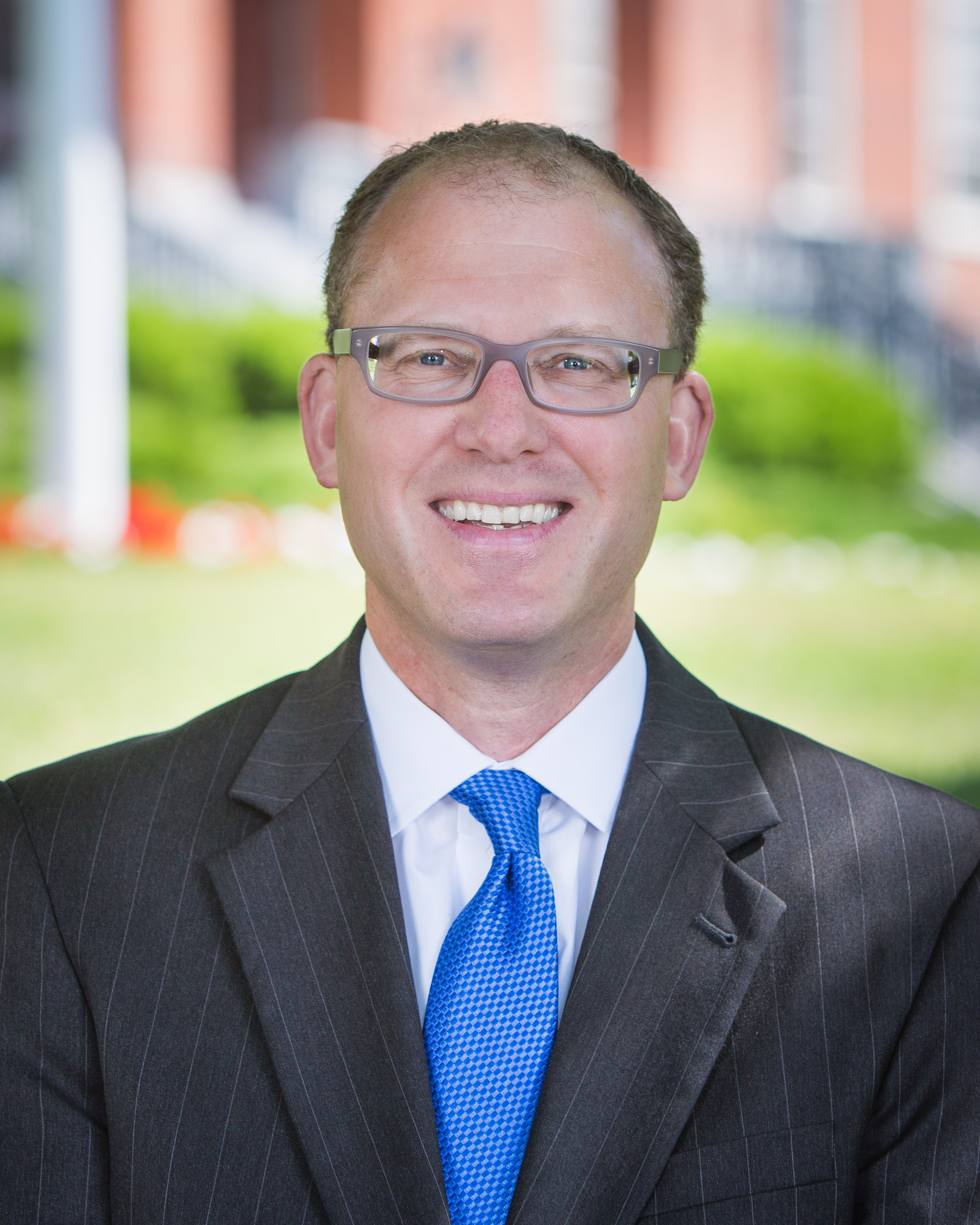
Jason Lewis
