= Will Brownsberger =

American politician from Massachusetts

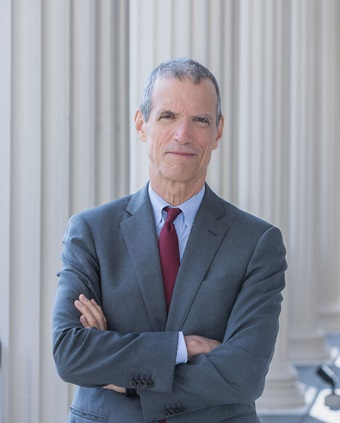

President pro tempore of the Massachusetts Senate
- Incumbent
- Assumed office March 20, 2019
- Preceded by: Marc R. Pacheco

Member of the Massachusetts Senate from the Suffolk and Middlesex district
- Incumbent
- Assumed office January 24, 2012
- Preceded by: Steven Tolman

Member of the Massachusetts House of Representatives from the 24th Middlesex district
- In office January 3, 2007 – January 24, 2012
- Preceded by: Anne Paulsen
- Succeeded by: David Rogers

Personal details
- Born: March 21, 1957 (age 69) Boston, Massachusetts, U.S.
- Party: Democratic
- Education: Harvard University (BA, JD)
- Website: Official website

William N. Brownsberger (born March 21, 1957) is an American politician and the President pro tempore of the Massachusetts Senate representing the Suffolk and Middlesex District which includes his hometown of Belmont, as well as Watertown, the Boston neighborhoods Allston and Brighton, part of Boston's Fenway–Kenmore area, and part of Cambridge. From 2007 to 2012, he was a member of the Massachusetts House of Representatives. He was a candidate for the Democratic nomination in the 2013 special election to succeed Ed Markey in the U.S. House of Representatives.

== Early life and education ==
Brownsberger was born in Boston, Massachusetts, and raised in nearby Watertown. He received a Bachelor of Arts from Harvard College in 1978 and then went on to obtain his Juris Doctor from Harvard Law School in 1985.

He served three terms as a Belmont Selectman and as Massachusetts Assistant Attorney General for six years.

== Massachusetts House of Representatives ==
Brownsberger served in the Massachusetts House of Representatives from 2007 to 2012, where he represented the 24th Middlesex district. He was endorsed by the Democratic Socialists of America while seeking reelection in 2010.

== Massachusetts Senate ==
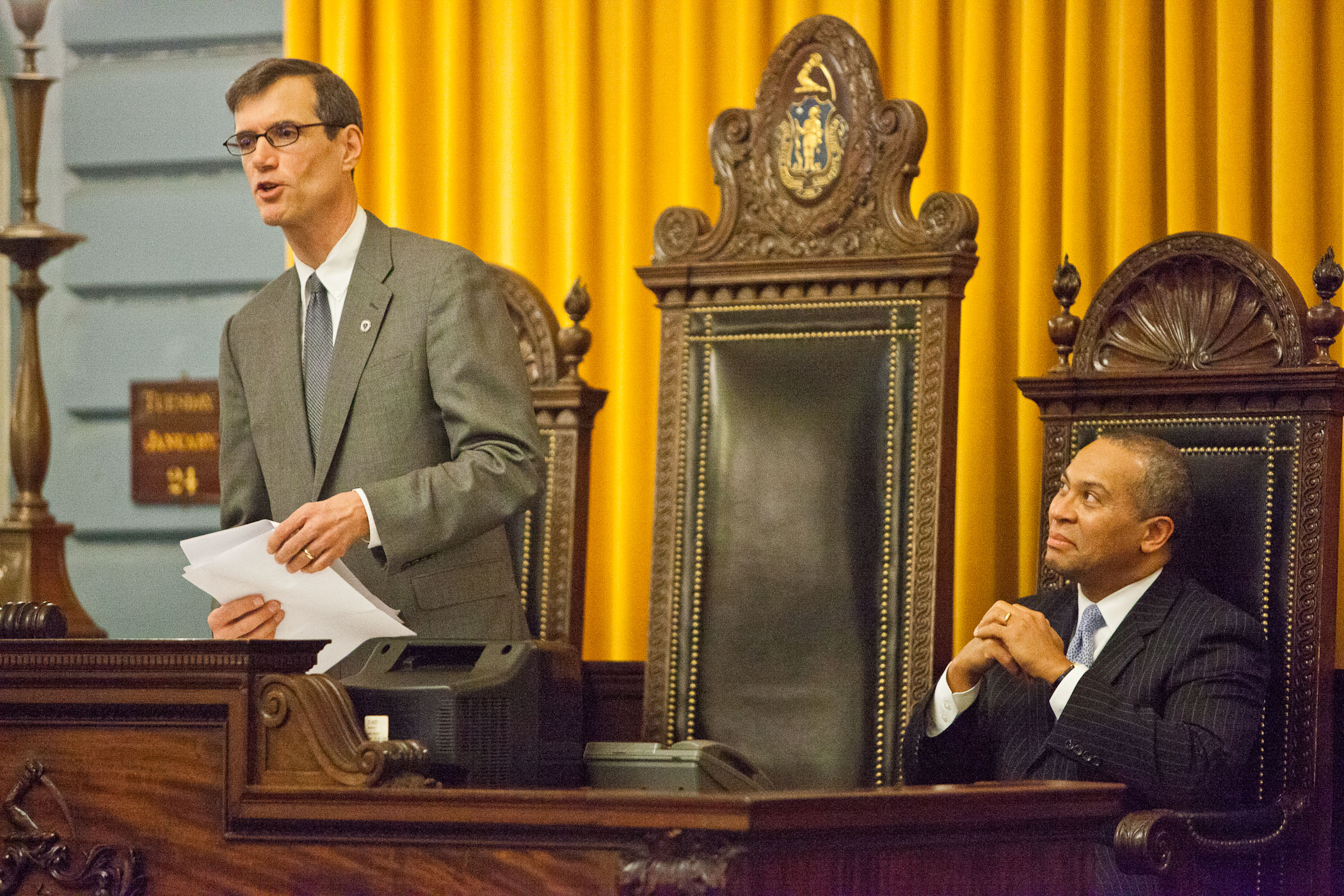
Brownsberger (left) in 2012, with Governor Deval Patrick

A member of the Democratic Party, he ran uncontested in a January 2012 special election to replace Steven Tolman in the Massachusetts Senate, having won a crowded Democratic primary. He was sworn in on January 24, 2012. He was then re-elected in November 2012 to a 2-year term to the 188th General Court.

=== Union opposition ===
In 2022, Brownsberger joined Senate President Karen Spilka in opposing unionization effort by Senate staffers, stating "There would be a whole lot of conflict of interest issues if they're working with a union who has its own political agenda. You can't have people serving multiple masters, that’s just not acceptable."

== Electoral history ==
Brownsberger ran unsuccessfully in the 2013 special election to succeed U.S. Representative Ed Markey, who resigned in June 2013 to take a seat in the U.S. Senate.

=== Massachusetts Senate ===
2024 Democratic primary, Massachusetts Senate's Suffolk and Middlesex district
Party	Candidate	Votes	%	±%
Democratic	William N. Brownsberger (incumbent)	14,027	99.4	
Total votes		14,114	100.0	
Source: "Election Statistics". Massachusetts Elections Division.

2024 Massachusetts Senate's Suffolk and Middlesex district election
Party	Candidate	Votes	%	±%
Democratic	William N. Brownsberger (incumbent)	56,815	98.8	
Total votes		57,500	100.0	
Source: "Election Statistics". Massachusetts Elections Division.

2022 Democratic primary, Massachusetts Senate's Suffolk and Middlesex district
Party	Candidate	Votes	%	±%
Democratic	William N. Brownsberger (incumbent)	15,977	99.4	
Total votes		16,067	100.0	
Source: "Election Statistics". Massachusetts Elections Division.

2022 Massachusetts Senate's Suffolk and Middlesex district election
Party	Candidate	Votes	%	±%
Democratic	William N. Brownsberger (incumbent)	42,713	99.0	
Total votes		43,150	100.0	
Source: "Election Statistics". Massachusetts Elections Division.

2020 Democratic primary, Massachusetts Senate's 2nd Suffolk and Middlesex district
Party	Candidate	Votes	%	±%
Democratic	William N. Brownsberger (incumbent)	30,358	99.4	
Total votes		30,539	100.0	
Source: "Election Statistics". Massachusetts Elections Division.

2020 Massachusetts Senate's 2nd Suffolk and Middlesex district election
Party	Candidate	Votes	%	±%
Democratic	William N. Brownsberger (incumbent)	60,282	98.5	
Total votes		61,181	100.0	
Source: "Election Statistics". Massachusetts Elections Division.

2018 Democratic primary, Massachusetts Senate's 2nd Suffolk and Middlesex district
Party	Candidate	Votes	%	±%
Democratic	William N. Brownsberger (incumbent)	15,990	99.5	
Total votes		16,075	100.0	
Source: "Election Statistics". Massachusetts Elections Division.

2018 Massachusetts Senate's 2nd Suffolk and Middlesex district election
Party	Candidate	Votes	%	±%
Democratic	William N. Brownsberger (incumbent)	50,823	98.5	
Total votes		51,581	100.0	
Source: "Election Statistics". Massachusetts Elections Division.

2016 Democratic primary, Massachusetts Senate's 2nd Suffolk and Middlesex district
Party	Candidate	Votes	%	±%
Democratic	William N. Brownsberger (incumbent)	5,156	98.5	
Total votes		5,233	100.0	
Source: "Election Statistics". Massachusetts Elections Division.

2016 Massachusetts Senate's 2nd Suffolk and Middlesex district election
Party	Candidate	Votes	%	±%
Democratic	William N. Brownsberger (incumbent)	56,011	98.6	
Total votes		56,815	100.0	
Source: "Election Statistics". Massachusetts Elections Division.

2014 Democratic primary, Massachusetts Senate's 2nd Suffolk and Middlesex district
Party	Candidate	Votes	%	±%
Democratic	William N. Brownsberger (incumbent)	10,194	98.9	
Total votes		10,309	100.0	
Source: "Election Statistics". Massachusetts Elections Division.

2014 Massachusetts Senate's 2nd Suffolk and Middlesex district election
Party	Candidate	Votes	%	±%
Democratic	William N. Brownsberger (incumbent)	30,514	98.2	
Total votes		31,080	100.0	
Source: "Election Statistics". Massachusetts Elections Division.

2012 Democratic primary, Massachusetts Senate's 2nd Suffolk and Middlesex district
Party	Candidate	Votes	%	±%
Democratic	William N. Brownsberger (incumbent)	6,156	99.1	
Total votes		6,212	100.0	
Source: "Election Statistics". Massachusetts Elections Division.

2012 Massachusetts Senate's 2nd Suffolk and Middlesex district election
Party	Candidate	Votes	%	±%
Democratic	William N. Brownsberger (incumbent)	45,852	76.1	
Republican	Steven W. Aylward	14,190	23.6	
Total votes		60,042	100.0	
Source: "Election Statistics". Massachusetts Elections Division.

Brownsberger won a special election in December 2011 to fill the Massachusetts Senate seat vacated by Steven Tolman.

2011 Democratic special primary, Massachusetts Senate's 2nd Suffolk and Middlesex district
Party	Candidate	Votes	%	±%
Democratic	William N. Brownsberger	4,961	32.6	
Democratic	Jonathan Hecht	3,899	25.6	
Democratic	Robert B. McCarthy	3,437	22.6	
Democratic	Timothy N. Schofield	2,887	19.0	
Total votes		15,184	100.0	
Source: "Election Statistics". Massachusetts Elections Division.

2011 special election, Massachusetts Senate's 2nd Suffolk and Middlesex district
Party	Candidate	Votes	%	±%
Democratic	William N. Brownsberger	4,581	93.9	
Total votes		4,880	100.0	
Source: "Election Statistics". Massachusetts Elections Division.

=== U.S. House of Representatives ===
Brownsberger was a candidate in the special election Democratic primary held on October 15, 2013, to fill the United States House of Representatives seat vacated by Ed Markey.

2013 Democratic special primary, Massachusetts's 5th congressional district
Party	Candidate	Votes	%	±%
Democratic	Katherine M. Clark	21,983	31.5	
Democratic	Peter J. Koutoujian	15,303	21.9	
Democratic	Carl M. Sciortino Jr.	11,160	16.0	
Democratic	William N. Brownsberger	10,163	14.6	
Democratic	Karen E. Spilka	9,088	13.0	
Democratic	Paul John Maisano	1,520	2.2	
Democratic	Martin Long	398	0.6	
Total votes		69,615	100.0	
Source: "Election Statistics". Massachusetts Elections Division.

=== Massachusetts House of Representatives ===
2010 Democratic primary, Massachusetts House of Representatives' 24th Middlesex district
Party	Candidate	Votes	%	±%
Democratic	William N. Brownsberger (incumbent)	3,108	99.2	
Total votes		3,134	100.0	
Source: "Election Statistics". Massachusetts Elections Division.

2010 Massachusetts House of Representatives' 24th Middlesex district election
Party	Candidate	Votes	%	±%
Democratic	William N. Brownsberger (incumbent)	12,732	77.5	
Unenrolled	Lalig Musserian	3,656	22.3	
Total votes		16,388	100.0	
Source: "Election Statistics". Massachusetts Elections Division.

2008 Democratic primary, Massachusetts House of Representatives' 24th Middlesex district
Party	Candidate	Votes	%	±%
Democratic	William N. Brownsberger (incumbent)	3,467	98.8	
Total votes		3,509	100.0	
Source: "Election Statistics". Massachusetts Elections Division.

2008 Massachusetts House of Representatives' 24th Middlesex district election
Party	Candidate	Votes	%	±%
Democratic	William N. Brownsberger (incumbent)	15,863	98.9	
Total votes		16,039	100.0	
Source: "Election Statistics". Massachusetts Elections Division.

2006 Democratic primary, Massachusetts House of Representatives' 24th Middlesex district
Party	Candidate	Votes	%	±%
Democratic	William N. Brownsberger	5,991	94.4	
Total votes		6,344	100.0	
Source: "Election Statistics". Massachusetts Elections Division.

2006 Massachusetts House of Representatives' 24th Middlesex district election
Party	Candidate	Votes	%	±%
Democratic	William N. Brownsberger	11,167	68.5	
Republican	M. Elizabeth Firenze	5,127	31.4	
Total votes		16,294	100.0	
Source: "Election Statistics". Massachusetts Elections Division.

== Personal life ==
Brownsberger resides in Belmont, Massachusetts. He is married with three daughters. He is also a marathoner, triathlete, and cyclist. Amidst the Pride parades of June 2023, he came out as bisexual while explaining that his announcement would not change his married lifestyle.

== See also ==
- 2019–2020 Massachusetts legislature
- 2021–2022 Massachusetts legislature

Massachusetts Senate
Preceded by Marc R. Pacheco	President pro tempore of the Massachusetts Senate; 2019–present	Incumbent
