= Massachusetts Senate's 2nd Suffolk and Middlesex district =

American legislative district

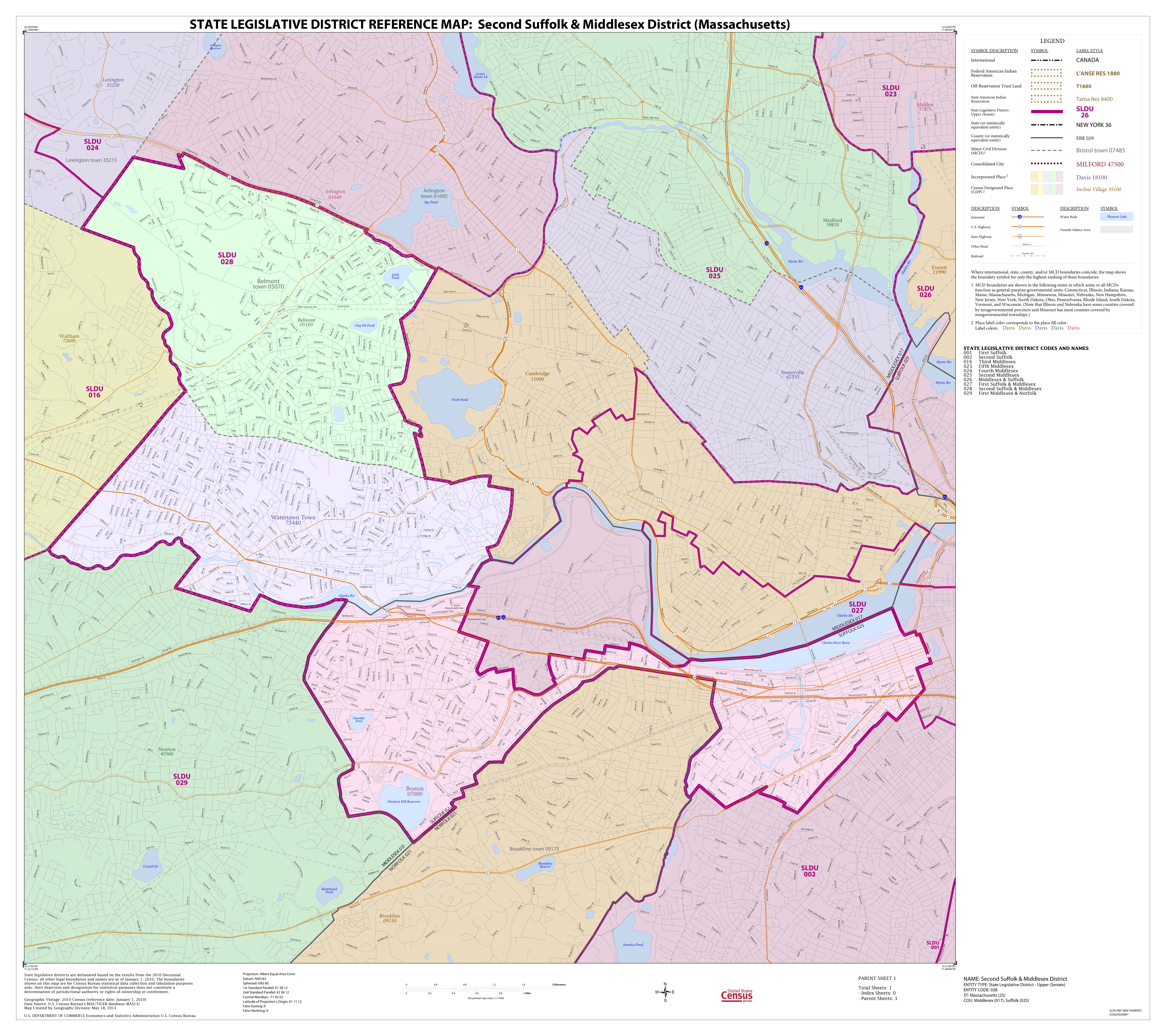
Map of Massachusetts Senate's 2nd Suffolk and Middlesex district, based on the 2010 United States census.

Massachusetts Senate's Suffolk and Middlesex district in the United States is one of 40 legislative districts of the Massachusetts Senate. It covers 3.8% of Middlesex County and 15.9% of Suffolk County population in 2010. Democrat Will Brownsberger of Belmont has represented the district since 2012.

== Locales represented ==
The district includes the following localities:

  - Most of Fenway
  - Allston
  - Brighton
  - Watertown
  - Belmont
  - West Cambridge — Ward 9, and precinct 2 of Ward 8

== Senators ==
- Steven Tolman, 1999-2011
- Will Brownsberger, 2012–present

== See also ==
- List of Massachusetts Senate elections
- List of Massachusetts General Courts
- List of former districts of the Massachusetts Senate
- Middlesex County districts of the Massachusetts House of Representatives: 1st, 2nd, 3rd, 4th, 5th, 6th, 7th, 8th, 9th, 10th, 11th, 12th, 13th, 14th, 15th, 16th, 17th, 18th, 19th, 20th, 21st, 22nd, 23rd, 24th, 25th, 26th, 27th, 28th, 29th, 30th, 31st, 32nd, 33rd, 34th, 35th, 36th, 37th
- Suffolk County districts of the Massachusetts House of Representatives: 1st, 2nd, 3rd, 4th, 5th, 6th, 7th, 8th, 9th, 10th, 11th, 12th, 13th, 14th, 15th, 16th, 17th, 18th, 19th
