= Massachusetts House of Representatives' 18th Suffolk district =

American legislative district

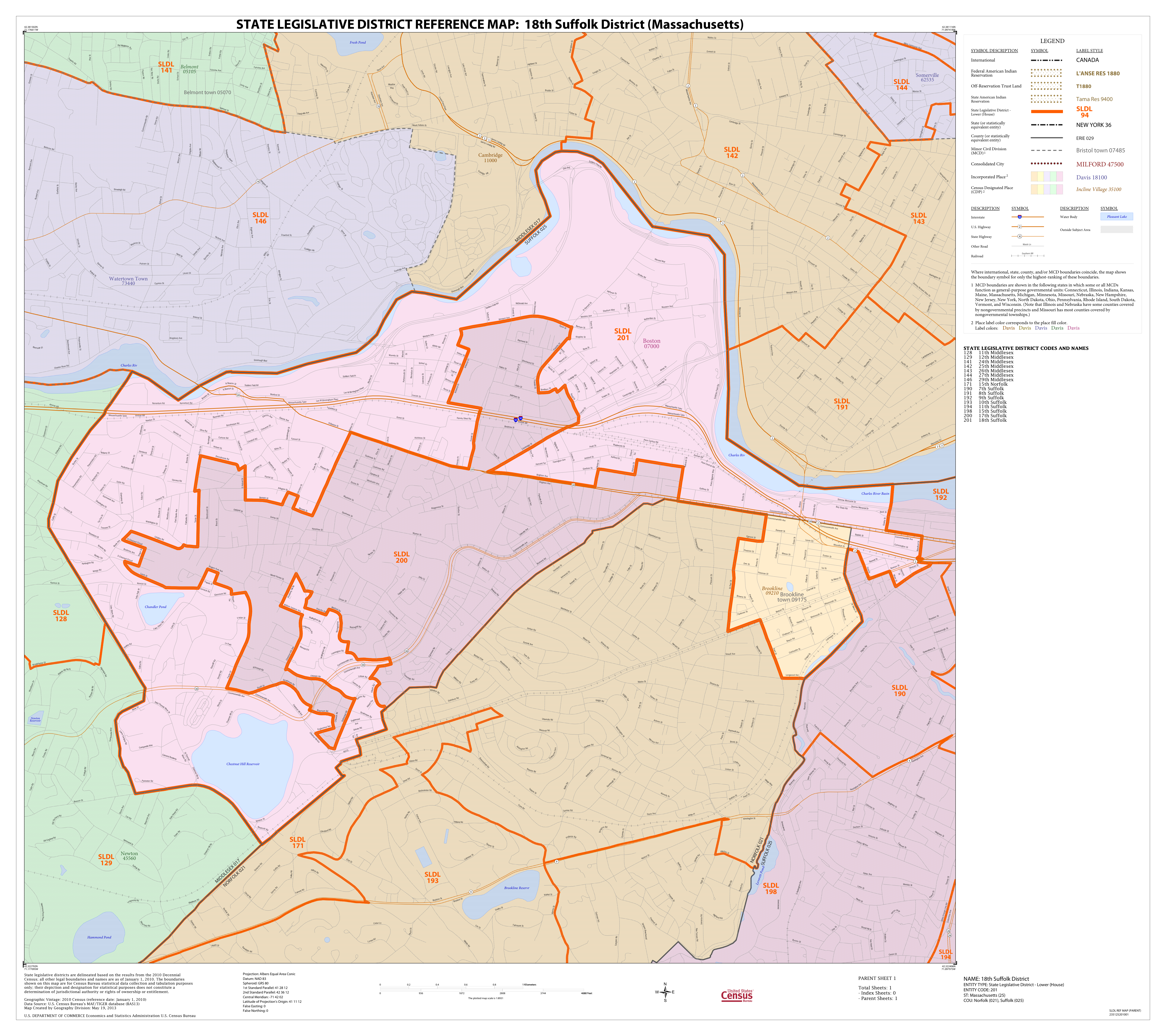
Map of Massachusetts House of Representatives' 18th Suffolk district, based on the 2010 United States census.

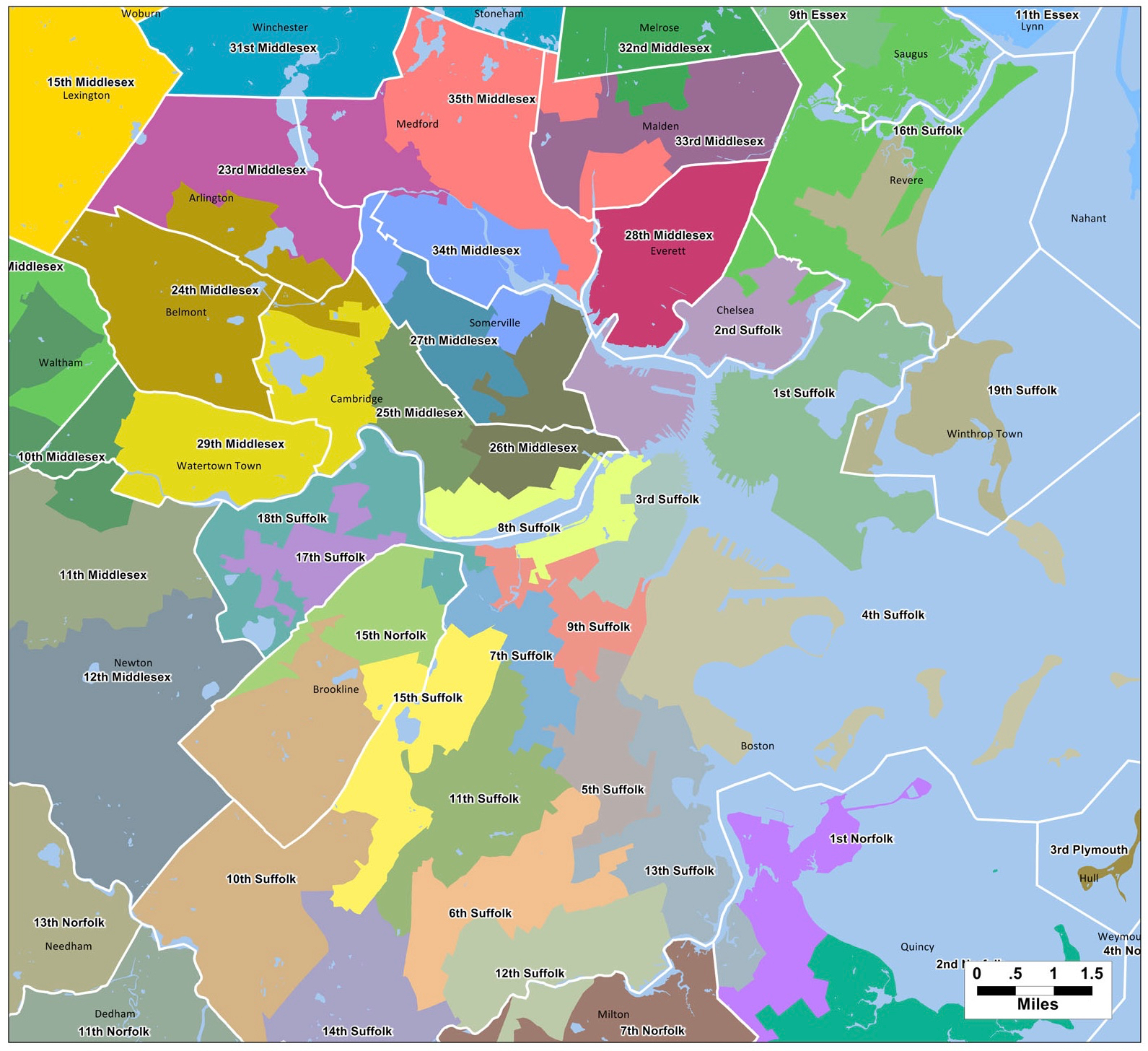
Map of Massachusetts House of Representatives districts for Suffolk County, apportioned in 2011

Massachusetts House of Representatives' 18th Suffolk district in the United States is one of 160 legislative districts included in the lower house of the Massachusetts General Court. It covers part of the city of Boston in Suffolk County and part of Brookline in Norfolk County. Since 2005, Michael J. Moran of the Democratic Party has represented the district.

The current district geographic boundary overlaps with those of the Massachusetts Senate's 1st Middlesex and Norfolk district, Middlesex and Suffolk district, and 2nd Suffolk and Middlesex district.

== Representatives ==
- Ralph E. Sirianni, Jr.
- John J. Finnegan
- John F. Melia
- Thomas M. Gallagher
- Kevin G. Honan
- Steven A. Tolman
- Brian P. Golden
- Michael J. Moran, 2005-current

== See also ==
- List of Massachusetts House of Representatives elections
- List of Massachusetts General Courts
- Other Suffolk County districts of the Massachusetts House of Representatives: 1st, 2nd, 3rd, 4th, 5th, 6th, 7th, 8th, 9th, 10th, 11th, 12th, 13th, 14th, 15th, 16th, 17th, 19th
- List of former districts of the Massachusetts House of Representatives

== Images ==
Portraits of legislators

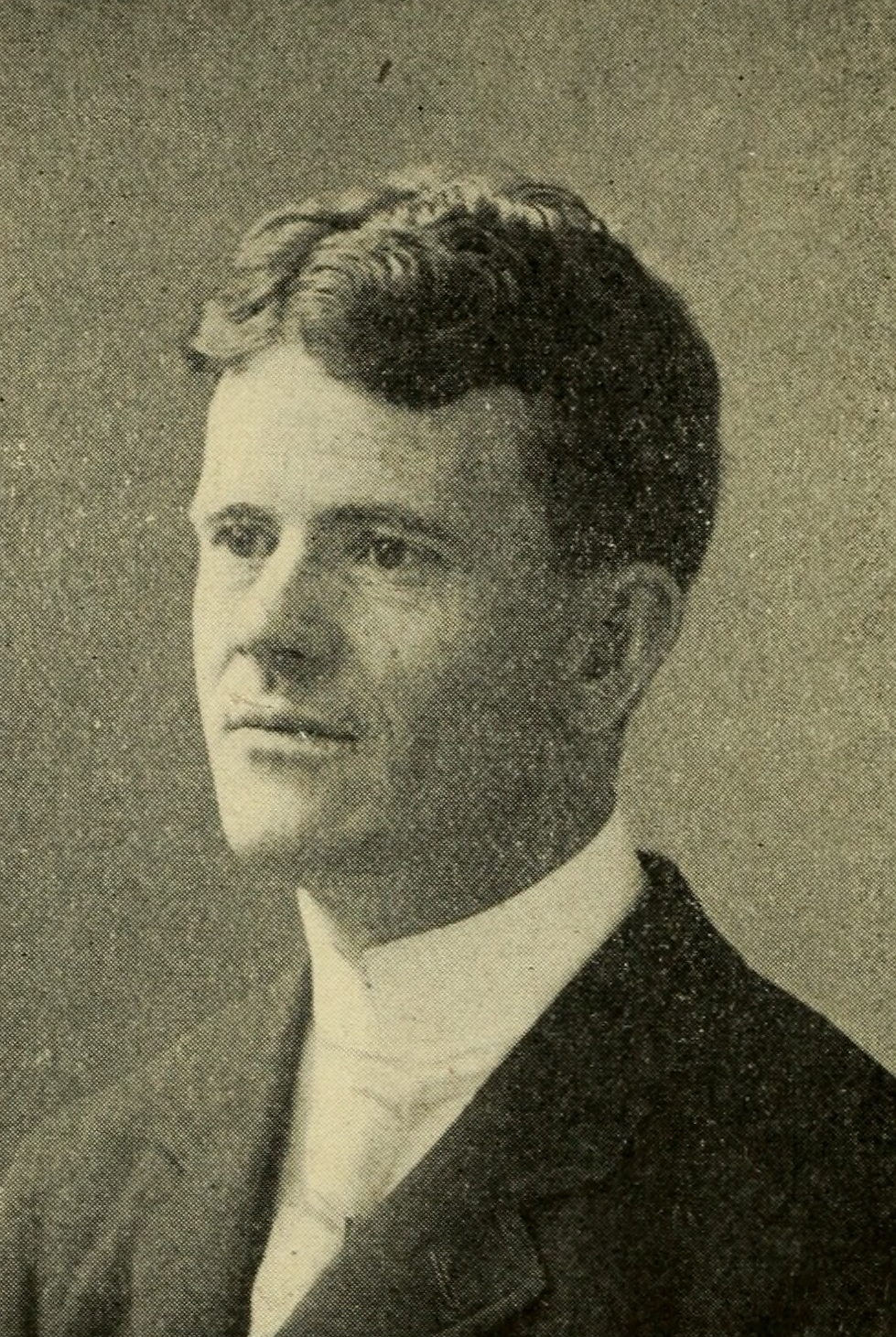
Daniel Curley

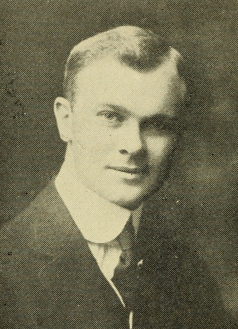
Charles Winchester

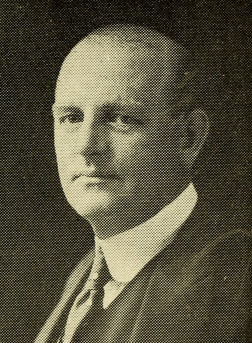
James Moynihan

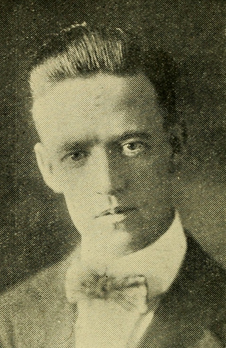
Francis Coyne

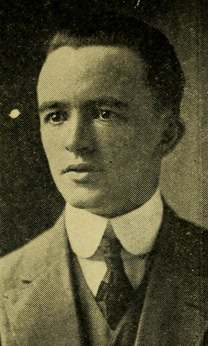
Richard Garvey

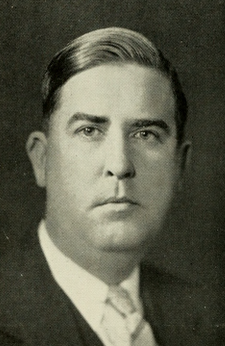
Frank Morrison

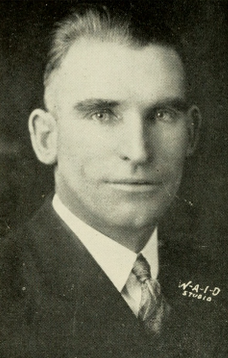
Patrick Welsh

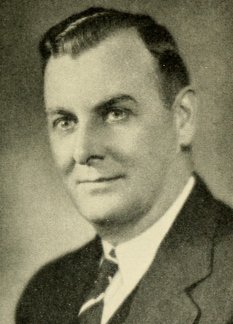
John Padden

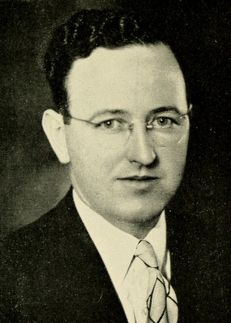
Michael Feeney

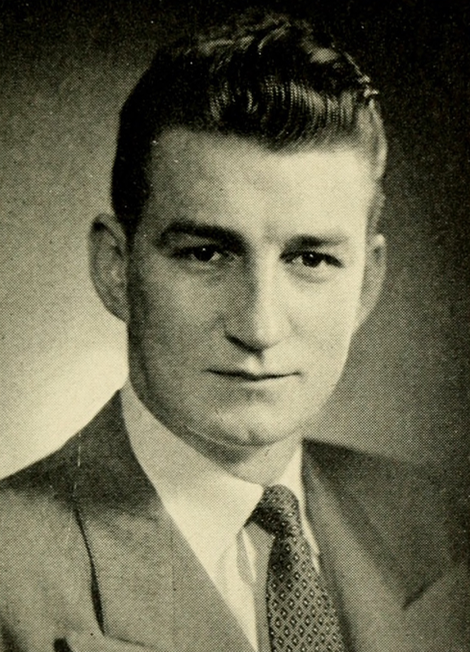
James William Hennigan

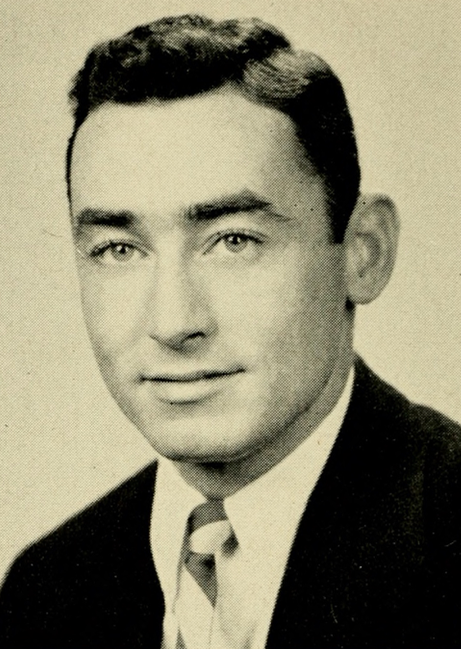
John Costello

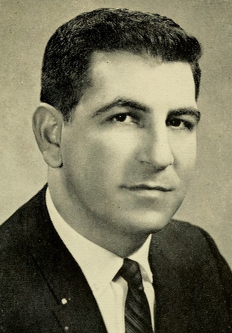
Joseph DiCarlo

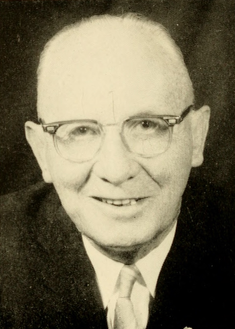
Raymond Carey

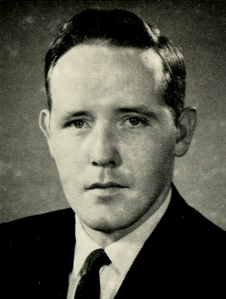
John Finnegan

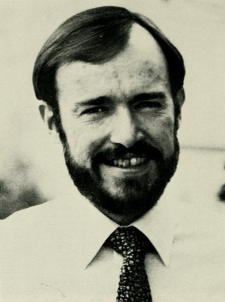
Thomas Gallagher

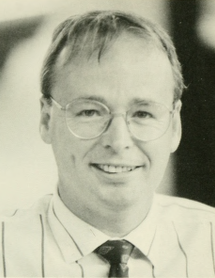
Steven Tolman

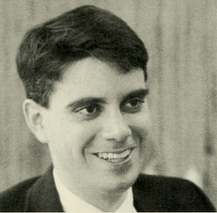
Brian Golden

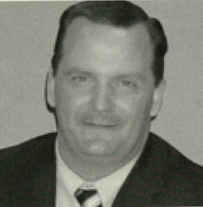
Michael Moran
