= Steven Tolman =

American labor union leader (born 1954)

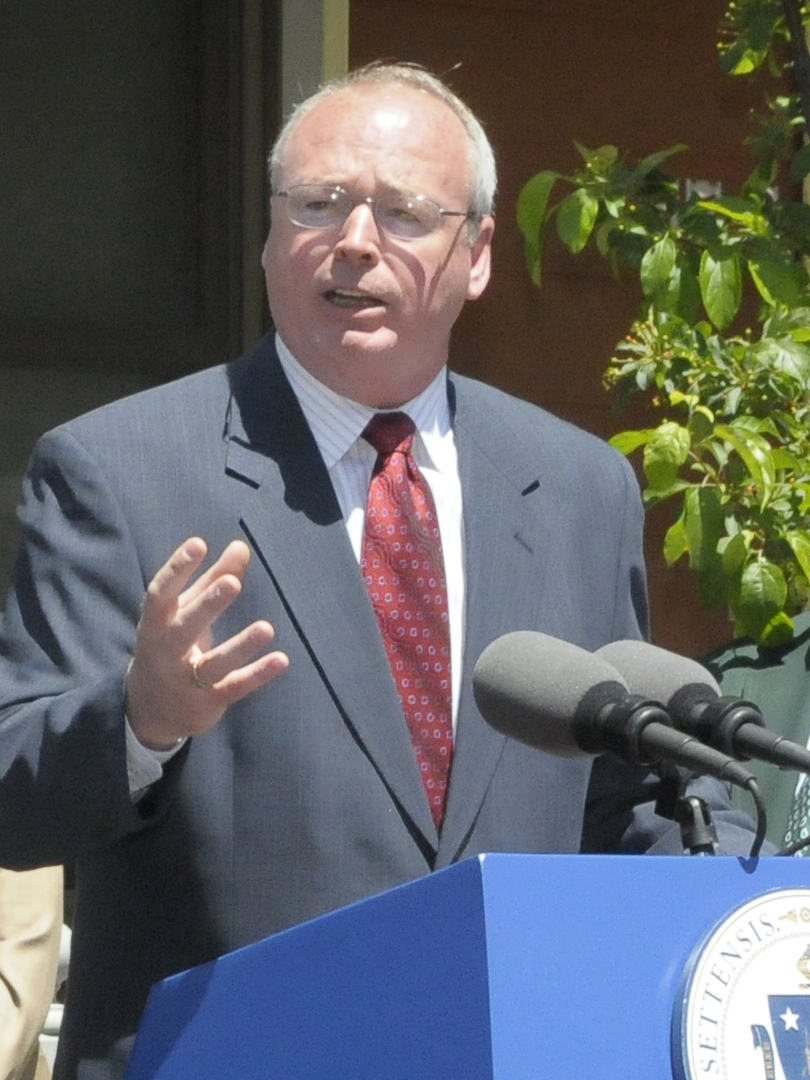
- Tolman in 2008

President of the Massachusetts AFL-CIO
- In office October 6, 2011 – October, 2023
- Preceded by: Robert Haynes

Member of the Massachusetts Senate from the 2nd Suffolk and Middlesex district
- In office January 6, 1999 – October 13, 2011
- Preceded by: Warren Tolman
- Succeeded by: Will Brownsberger

Member of the Massachusetts House of Representatives from the 18th Suffolk district
- In office 1995–1999
- Preceded by: Kevin G. Honan
- Succeeded by: Brian P. Golden

Personal details
- Born: October 2, 1954 (age 71) Brighton, Massachusetts, U.S.
- Party: Democratic

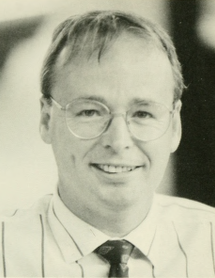
Official portrait of Tolman, c. 1995

Steven A. Tolman (born October 2, 1954, in Brighton, Massachusetts) is an American labor union leader who is the past president of the Massachusetts AFL–CIO. He is a former state legislator who served in the Massachusetts Senate (1999–2011), representing the 2nd Suffolk and Middlesex district, and the Massachusetts House of Representatives (1995–1999). Prior to serving in the Massachusetts legislature, he was a commissioner for the Watertown Housing Authority and a member of the Democratic State Committee.

He was elected president of the Massachusetts AFL–CIO on October 6, 2011. He remained in the state senate until October 13, 2011, following the vote on the casino gambling bill.

Tolman is a resident of the Brighton neighborhood in Boston and is a member of the Democratic Party. He is the brother of former state senator Warren Tolman.
