= Christine Barber =

American politician

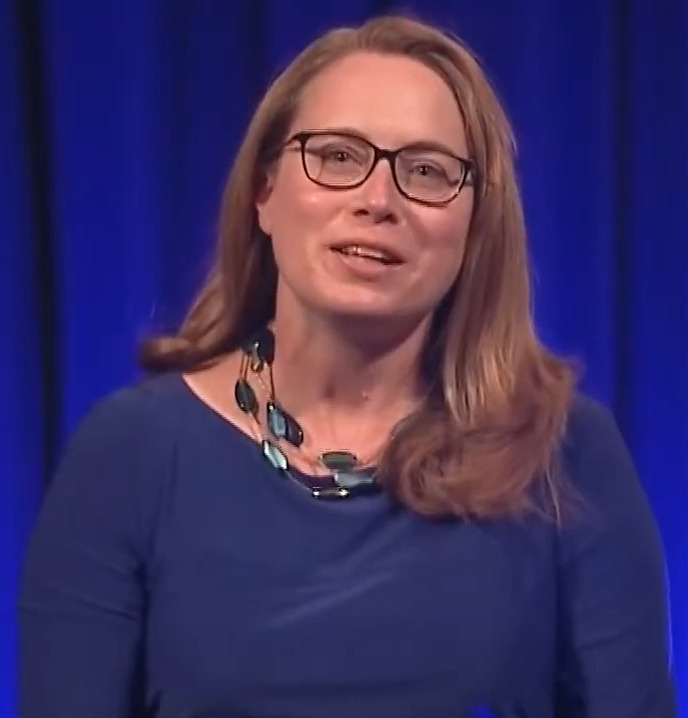
- Barber in 2022

Member of the Massachusetts House of Representatives from the 34th Middlesex district
- Incumbent
- Assumed office January 7, 2015
- Preceded by: Carl Sciortino

Personal details
- Party: Democratic
- Education: UMass Amherst, MPPA; College of the Holy Cross, B.A.

Christine P. Barber is an American politician who represents the 34th Middlesex district in the Massachusetts House of Representatives. A member of the Democratic Party, her district includes parts of the cities of Medford and Somerville.

== Political career ==
Barber was elected to the Massachusetts House of Representatives in 2014, succeeding Representative Carl Sciortino, who had resigned to become executive director of the AIDS Action Committee of Massachusetts. She defeated three other candidates in the Democratic primary and unenrolled candidate Nicholas Lanzilli in the general election.

In 2025, Barber filed legislation to remove restrictions on abortion after 24 weeks of gestation. A version of the legislation was signed into law in 2026.

In January 2026, following the retirement announcement of incumbent Senator Pat Jehlen, Barber announced her candidacy for the Massachusetts Senate's 2nd Middlesex district. Jehlen subsequently endorsed Barber's candidacy.

=== Committee Assignments ===
- Chairperson, Joint Committee on Environment and Natural Resources

== Personal life ==
Barber lives in Somerville with her longtime partner, Ryan.

== See also ==
- 2019–2020 Massachusetts legislature
- 2021–2022 Massachusetts legislature
