= Mary Gibson =

Mary Gibson may refer to:

- Mary Gibson Hundley (1897–1986), née Gibson, American educator and civil rights activist
- Mary Gibson (principal) (1864–1929), New Zealand teacher and school principal
- Mary Irwin-Gibson, Canadian bishop of the Anglican Diocese of Montreal
- Mary Jane Gibson, member of the Massachusetts House of Representatives
- Mary Keys Gibson (1854–1952), American nurse
- Mary Stewart Gibson (1904–1989), Scottish artist
