= AIDS Action Committee of Massachusetts =

American non-profit organization

Founded in 1983, AIDS Action Committee (AAC) of Massachusetts is a not-for-profit, community-based health organization whose mission is to stop the epidemic and related health inequities by eliminating new infections, maximizing healthier outcomes of those infected and at risk, and attacking the root causes of HIV/AIDS. Based in Boston, it is New England's oldest and largest AIDS service organization. Since 2013, it has been operating as part of Fenway Health. As of 2022, it has provided free, confidential services to 195,000 men, women and children living with HIV/AIDS as well as prevention services to many thousands of men, women and youth who are not living with HIV or do not know their status.

== History ==
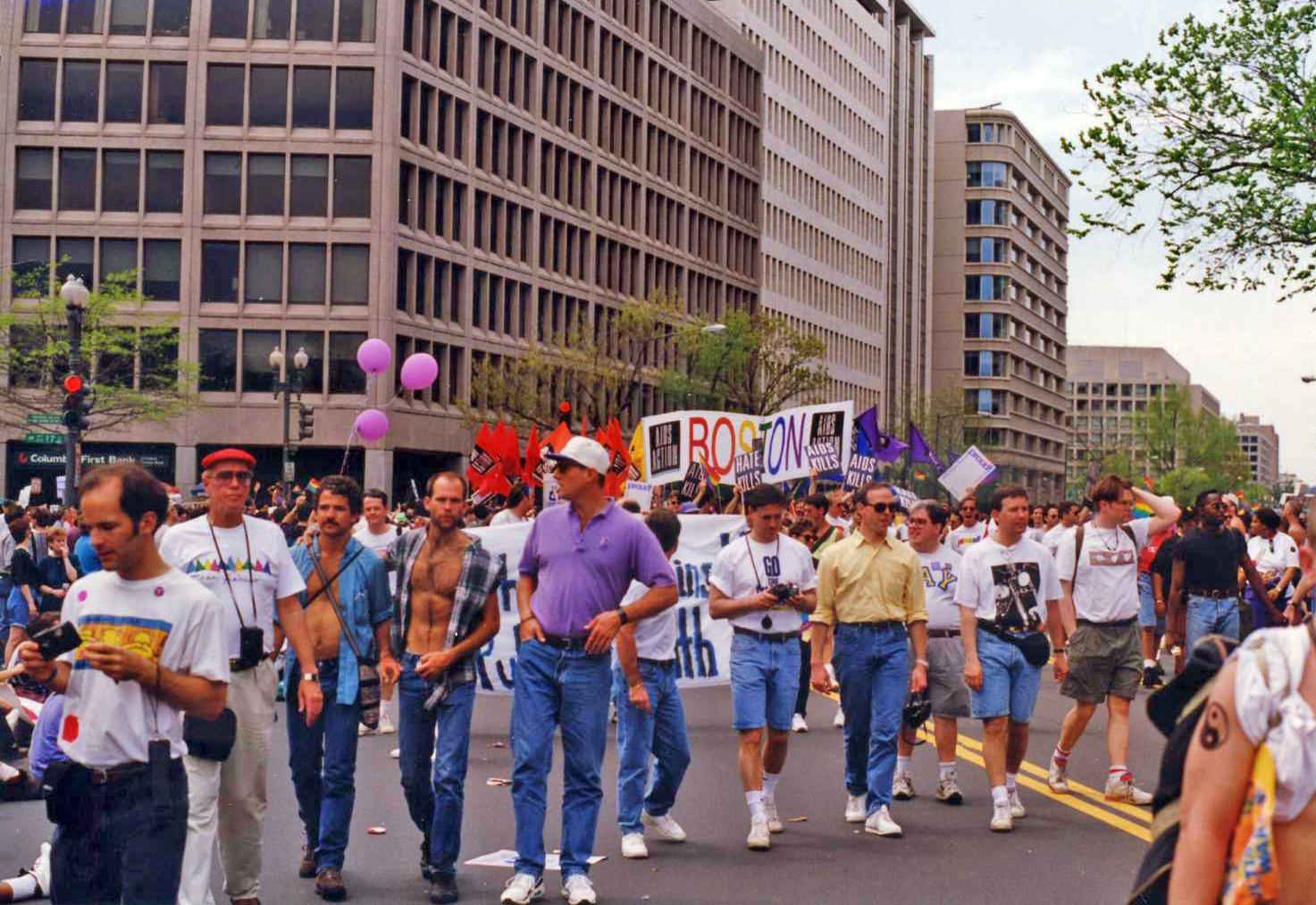
AIDS Action Boston at the 1993 March on Washington for LGB Equal Rights and Liberation

In 2010, AIDS Action Committee of Massachusetts merged with Cambridge Cares About AIDS into a new agency operating under the AIDS Action Committee name. The organizations joined together after nearly two years of strategic planning and stakeholder-led development. The partnership was motivated by the desire to transform the way AIDS services are delivered in the Greater Boston area. In 2014, state Representative Carl Sciortino became its executive director.

In 2013, AIDS Action became a part of Fenway Health, while continuing to offer programs and services under its own name.

== Services and advocacy ==
AAC provides direct services to people living with HIV in Massachusetts, including housing advocacy, legal services, drug and alcohol support and support groups. It advocates for fair and effective HIV/AIDS policy at the city, state and federal levels, focusing on science-based prevention, racial and ethnic health disparities, privacy and confidentiality, and funding. AAC also works with AIDS Action Council, which advocates primarily on the national level for people living with or affected by HIV/AIDS.

The Prevention Department at AAC provides a range of prevention and education activities designed to reduce new HIV infections, focusing on HIV prevention grounded in public health, targeted to specific populations, and not based in shame, guilt, or fear. As part of its prevention efforts, AAC operates the statewide HIV and STD hotline for both Massachusetts and Rhode Island and the Massachusetts hepatitis hotline.

AAC's community prevention outreach includes the Men's Action Life Empowerment (MALE) Center, a community resource and wellness center that integrates community outreach, life-skills education and empowerment activities, HIV safer-sex skills-building, and free rapid HIV counseling and testing for gay and bisexual men. AAC also works with other community organizations and schools to educate youth about sexual health.

== Funding ==
In addition to grants from the Massachusetts Department of Public Health and other entities, AAC diversifies its funding through fundraising events including ARTcetera, a biennial art auction that features art from acclaimed artists such as Mr. Brainwash, Ryan McGinley, Mitch Weiss, Harold Eugene Edgerton and AIDS Walk Boston, Boston's second largest fundraising walk. On June 5, 2023, Fenway Health made public their decision to change the name and directive of AIDS Walk Boston. For 37 years, AIDS Walk Boston raised funds for HIV/AIDS research and awareness. Fenway Health renamed the event Strides for Pride in an effort to broaden the focus to the LGBTQIA+ Community.

AAC also receives 100% of the funds raised by Boomerangs, its award-winning resale store with locations in Jamaica Plain, Cambridge and West Roxbury and their sister store, Boomerangs Special Edition, located in the South End neighborhood of Boston. Boomerangs announced on May 1st, 2024 that it would be closing all of its stores in June 2024.

On September 26, 1988, the AIDS Benefit Concert was held and profits donated to the AAC.
