= Timothy J. Toomey Jr. =

American politician

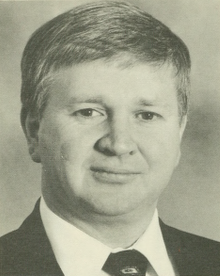
- Toomey circa 1995

Member of the Massachusetts House of Representatives from the 26th Middlesex and 29th Middlesex district
- In office January 4, 1993 – January 4, 2017
- Preceded by: Peter A. Vellucci
- Succeeded by: Mike Connolly

Cambridge City Councillor
- In office 1990–2022

Cambridge School Committee Member
- In office 1986–1990

Personal details
- Born: June 7, 1953 (age 73)
- Party: Democratic
- Education: Suffolk University
- Website: TimToomey.org

Timothy J. Toomey Jr. (born June 7, 1953) was the Massachusetts State Representative for the 26th Middlesex District, which comprises East Cambridge and East Somerville, and a member of the Cambridge City Council. He served as a state representative from 1993 to 2017 and has served as a city councillor since 1990. Toomey has also served as a member of the Cambridge School Committee and vice mayor of Cambridge. He is a member of the Democratic Party and has run as a Democrat for the office of state representative; Cambridge City Council elections are, however, non-partisan.

== Early life ==
Toomey is a graduate of Matignon High School in Cambridge and holds a bachelor's degree from Suffolk University in Boston, MA.

== Political career ==
Toomey began his career in government in 1985 when he was elected to the Cambridge School Committee and served two terms as a committee member.

=== City council ===
In 1989, Toomey ran for a position on the Cambridge City Council and was elected. He has won re-election every two years since, with his most recent victory coming in 2019.

In 2006, Toomey was elected by the city council to a two-year term as vice mayor of Cambridge.

=== Massachusetts House of Representatives ===
In 1992, Toomey ran for the State Representative seat vacated by Peter Vellucci. He earned 48% of the vote in the Democratic primary, defeating Karen Uminski by a nine-point margin and securing the party nomination. Toomey earned 72% of the vote in the general election, and was sworn in as a State Representative in January 1993.

In 2004, Toomey handily defeated author David R. Slavitt.

In 2016, Toomey was defeated in the Democratic primary by local environmental activist and attorney opponent Mike Connolly. The primary was held on September 8, 2016.

Toomey had previously served as the House Chair of the Joint Committee on Public Safety and Homeland Security and the Joint Committee on Public Service, as well as Vice Chair of the Joint Committee on Revenue.

== Political views ==
=== Immigration ===
Toomey has described himself as a supporter of policies that benefit immigrants. As a State Representative he supported legislation that would allow immigrants without legal status who were brought to Massachusetts as children to receive in-state tuition rates at state schools.

In August 2010, Toomey submitted a resolution to the Cambridge City Council in support of the DREAM Act, which was adopted by the membership.

=== Transportation ===
Toomey has voiced opposition to the State's proposal to expand MBTA commuter rail service to North Station via the Grand Junction Railroad. The line, which was purchased by the Massachusetts Department of Transportation, runs through residential areas of Toomey's district. Toomey is an avid supporter of the Grand Junction Multi-Use Path proposal that would bring a walk/bike route to eastern Cambridge, connecting with Boston on the southern end and Somerville on the north. He won a substantial investment from the Massachusetts Institute of Technology to fund a partial feasibility study and construction of a section of the Grand Junction Path during a Fall 2013 zoning negotiation.

=== Gun control ===
In 2009, Toomey filed legislation that would limit Massachusetts residents to purchasing one firearm per month.

=== Abortion and reproductive rights ===
In 2016, in the Democratic Party primary, Toomey's opponent Mike Connolly was endorsed by NARAL Prochoice Massachusetts. NARAL stated that Rep. Toomey has called abortion an "act of violence" on the House floor, and voted to restrict abortion access on a bill to codify in Massachusetts law a woman's right to choose.

In 2014, Toomey was noted as "100% pro-life" by the Mass Citizens for Life.

=== Casino gambling ===
Toomey was the only member of the Massachusetts House of Representatives from Cambridge to vote for expanded casino gaming in Massachusetts. He reasoned that casinos would provide an economic benefit to the state, and released the following statement: "[the expanded gaming bill] would increase revenue and create jobs while mitigating community impacts and implementing a comprehensive regulatory structure..."

== See also ==
- Cambridge, Massachusetts municipal election, 2013
