= Massachusetts House of Representatives' 24th Middlesex district =

American legislative district

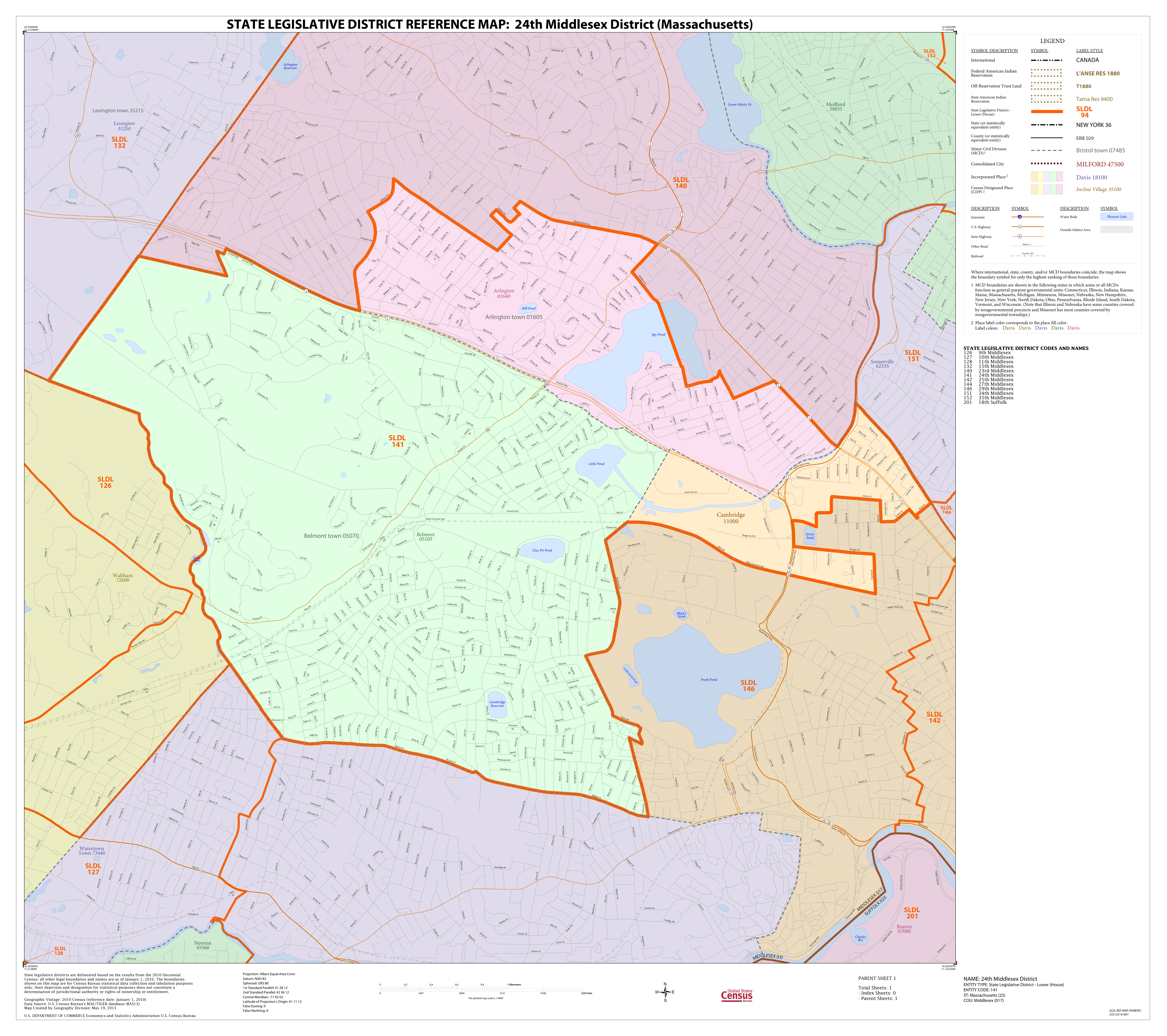
Map of Massachusetts House of Representatives' 24th Middlesex district, based on the 2010 United States census.

Massachusetts House of Representatives' 24th Middlesex district in the United States is one of 160 legislative districts included in the lower house of the Massachusetts General Court. It covers part of Middlesex County, namely Arlington, Belmont, and Cambridge.

Democrat Dave Rogers of Cambridge has represented the district since 2013. Candidates for this district seat in the 2020 Massachusetts general election include Jennifer Fries.

== Locales represented ==
The district includes the following localities:

- part of Arlington
- Belmont
- part of Cambridge (namely the neighborhood of North Cambridge)

The current district geographic boundary overlaps with those of the Massachusetts Senate's 2nd Middlesex district, 4th Middlesex district, and 2nd Suffolk and Middlesex district.

=== Former locales ===
The district previously covered:

- North Reading, circa 1872
- Reading, circa 1872
- Wilmington, circa 1872

== Representatives ==
- Stephen K. Fielding, circa 1858
- John C. Jepson, circa 1858
- Geo. Stevens, circa 1858
- Walter Burnham, circa 1859
- John A. Goodwin, circa 1859
- Tappan Wentworth, circa 1859
- Solomon K. Dexter, circa 1888
- George Francis Morey, circa 1888
- Warren Chapman Daggett, circa 1920
- Wilbur F. Lewis, circa 1920
- Catherine E. Falvey, 1941–1944
- Joseph F. Leahy, circa 1951
- Paul A. McCarthy, circa 1951
- Harold A. Palmer, circa 1951
- William Francis Hogan, circa 1975
- Anne M. Paulsen circa 2003–2007
- William N. Brownsberger 2007–2021
- David M. Rogers, 2013–current

== See also ==
- List of Massachusetts House of Representatives elections
- List of Massachusetts General Courts
- List of former districts of the Massachusetts House of Representatives
- Other Middlesex County districts of the Massachusetts House of Representatives: 1st, 2nd, 3rd, 4th, 5th, 6th, 7th, 8th, 9th, 10th, 11th, 12th, 13th, 14th, 15th, 16th, 17th, 18th, 19th, 20th, 21st, 22nd, 23rd, 25th, 26th, 27th, 28th, 29th, 30th, 31st, 32nd, 33rd, 34th, 35th, 36th, 37th

== Legislator portraits ==
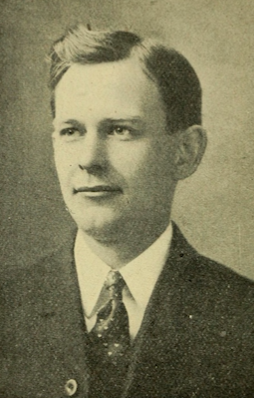
Frank Torrey

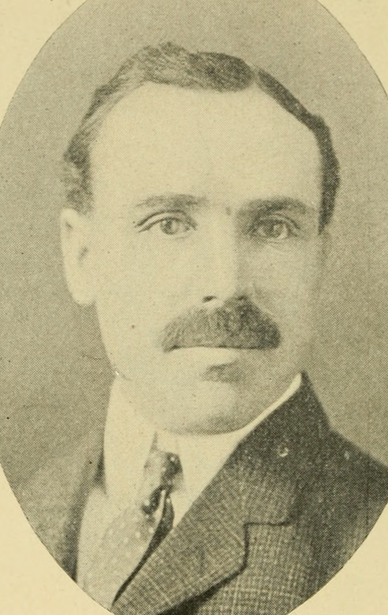
James Chambers

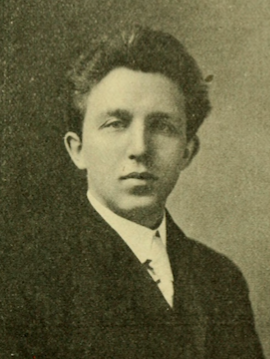
William Weeks

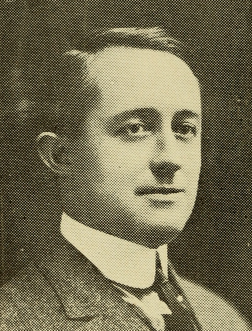
Arthur Robinson

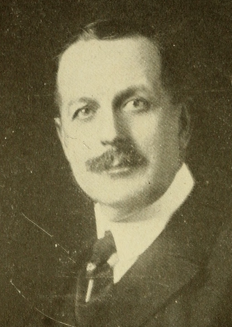
Warren Chapman Daggett

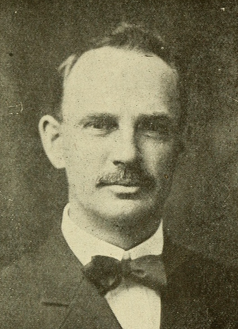
William French

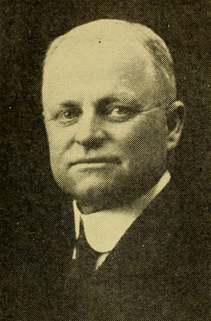
Hiram Nichols Dearborn

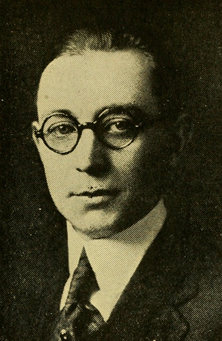
Wilbur Lewis

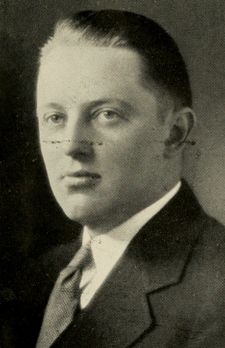
Eugene Giroux

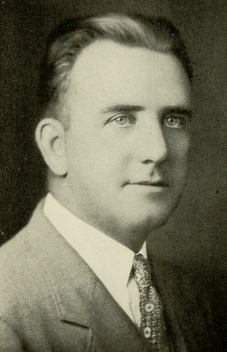
Francis Ryan

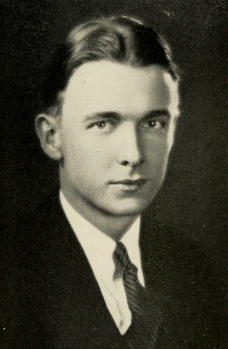
John Donahue

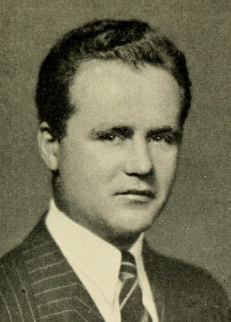
Henry Murray

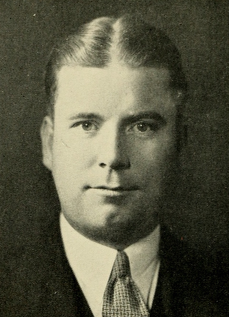
Paul McCarthy

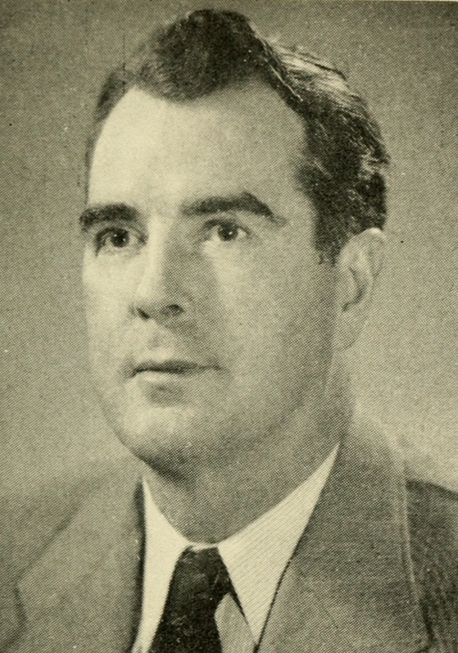
G. Edward Bradley

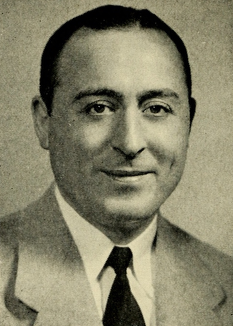
Michael John Simonelli

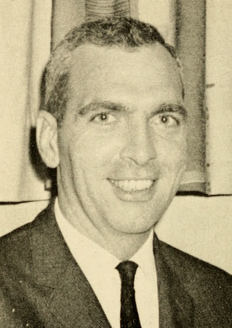
Joseph Travaline

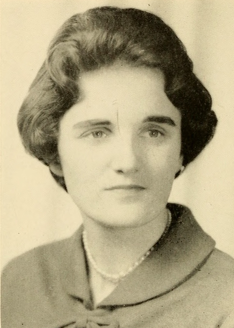
Marie Elizabeth Howe

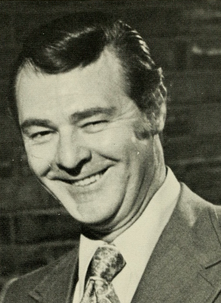
William Hogan

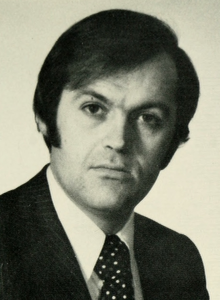
Michael Rea

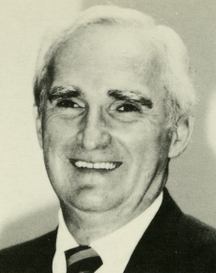
William Greene

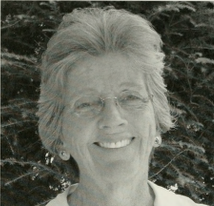
Anne Paulsen

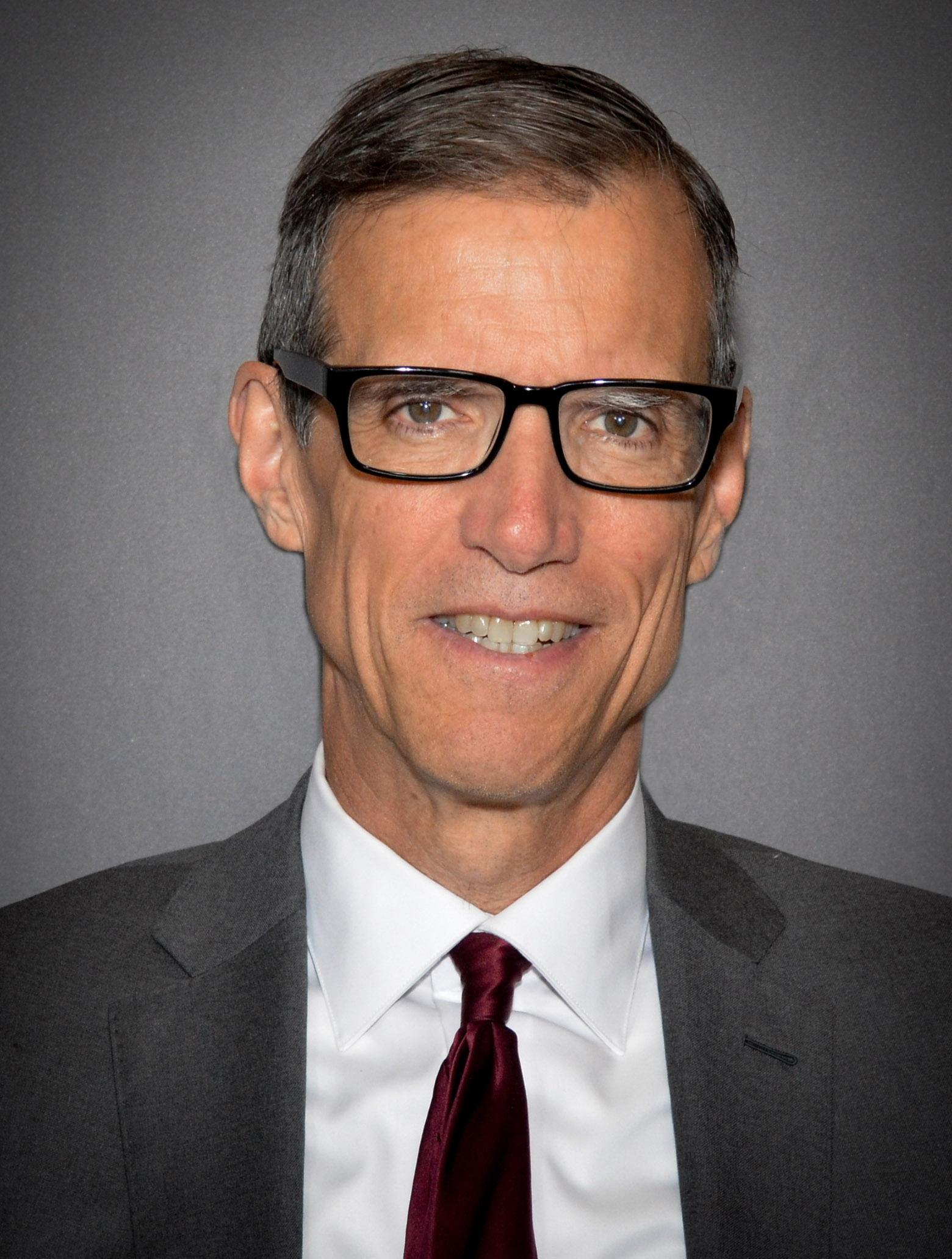
William Brownsberger
