= Dave Rogers (Massachusetts politician) =

American politician

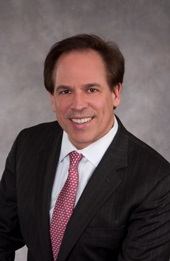

Member of the Massachusetts House of Representatives from the 24th Middlesex district
- Incumbent
- Assumed office January 7, 2013
- Preceded by: William N. Brownsberger

Personal details
- Party: Democratic

David M. Rogers is an American state legislator serving in the Massachusetts House of Representatives. He is a Cambridge resident and a member of the Democratic Party.

== See also ==
- Massachusetts House of Representatives' 24th Middlesex district
- 2019–2020 Massachusetts legislature
- 2021–2022 Massachusetts legislature
