= Mike Connolly (Massachusetts politician) =

American politician (born 1980)

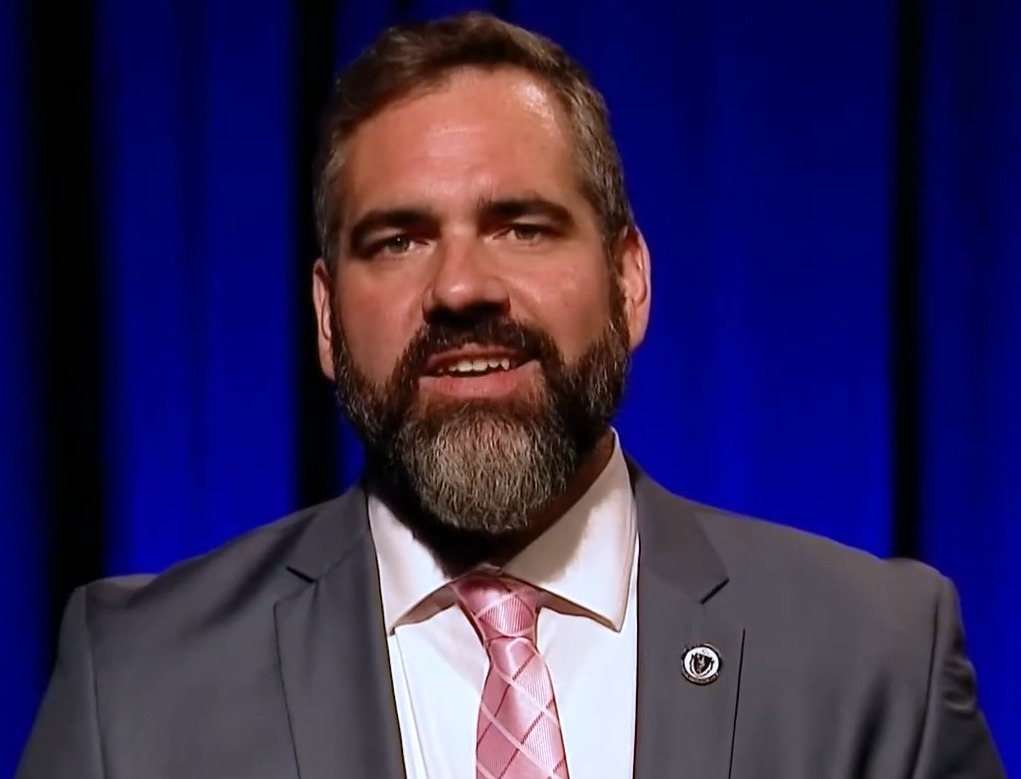
- Connolly in 2022

Member of the Massachusetts House of Representatives from the 26th Middlesex district
- Incumbent
- Assumed office January 4, 2017
- Preceded by: Tim Toomey

Personal details
- Born: June 3, 1980 (age 46) Dorchester, Massachusetts, U.S.
- Party: Democratic
- Other political affiliations: Democratic Socialists of America (until 2023)
- Education: Duke University (BA); Boston College (JD)
- Website: Official website Campaign website

Michael L. Connolly (born June 3, 1980) is an American activist, attorney, and politician from Massachusetts.

== Early life and career ==
Connolly was born in the Dorchester area of Boston, Massachusetts. From 2004 to 2006 he was a project manager for Rexel. In 2007 he was a legal intern for the Berkman Klein Center for Internet & Society at Harvard University. From 2009 to 2010 he was a communications fellow for the Boston College Law Magazine. While in law school, he volunteered with the Appellate Division of the Committee for Public Council Services where he served as an editor for the Intellectual Property and Technology Forum. During this time he also spent summers working for the law firm of Goulston & Storrs, P.C. and the Berkman Center for Internet and Society. He is a former staff writer and managing editor for the Journal of Law and Social Justice (formerly known as The Third World Law Journal). From 2011 to 2012 he was a project manager for HP Autonomy. From 2013 to 2014 he was the founder and campaign manager of Net Zero Cambridge. Since 2013 he has been an instructor and tutor for Kaplan, Inc.

== Political career ==
From 2014 to 2015 he was an aide to Cambridge city councilman Dennis Carlone.

He defeated Representative Timothy J. Toomey Jr. in September 2016 in the Democratic primary for the 26th Middlesex District, which comprises East Cambridge and East Somerville. Connolly was active with Occupy Boston and ran unsuccessfully against Toomey in 2012. In 2016, he was backed by Our Revolution, a Bernie Sanders-based political organization, and was endorsed by the prominent Cambridge academics Noam Chomsky and Lawrence Lessig. Connolly beat Toomey by about 300 votes and was elected to represent the 26th Middlesex District after Toomey's term ended; Connolly did not face a Republican in the November 2016 election for the Massachusetts House of Representatives. Connolly opposed the November 2016 "ballot question that would lift the charter school cap" and supports the legalization of recreational marijuana. He is a member of the Democratic Socialists of America, although the Boston chapter announced in July 2023 that they were considering his expulsion from the local chapter. On July 10, 2023, Connolly announced he was leaving the Boston DSA in response to the expulsion proceedings.

His proposal to institute rent control in Massachusetts failed by a vote of 22-136.

== Committee assignments ==
For the 2025-26 Session, Connolly sits in the following committees in the House:

- Vice Chair, House Committee on Intergovernmental Affairs
- Joint Committee on Bonding, Capital Expenditures and State Assets
- Joint Committee on Municipalities and Regional Government
- Joint Committee on Tourism, Arts and Cultural Development

For the 2023-24 Session, Connolly sat in the following committees in the House:

- House Committee on Post Audit and Oversight
- Joint Committee on Bonding, Capital Expenditures and State Assets
- Joint Committee on Housing
- Joint Committee on Municipalities and Regional Government

For the 2021-22 Session, Connolly sat in the following committees in the House:

- Joint Committee on Bonding, Capital Expenditures and State Assets
- Joint Committee on Export Development
- Joint Committee on Housing
- Joint Committee on Municipalities and Regional Government

For the 2019-20 Session, Connolly sat in the following committees in the House:

- House Committee on Bonding, Capital Expenditures and State Assets
- House Committee on Steering, Policy and Scheduling
- Joint Committee on Export Development
- Joint Committee on Public Service

For the 2017-18 Session, Connolly sat in the following committees in the House:

- House Committee on Bonding, Capital Expenditures and State Assets
- House Committee on Steering, Policy and Scheduling
- Joint Committee on Housing
- Joint Committee on Veterans and Federal Affairs

== Caucuses ==
Connolly is a member of the following caucuses:

- Founding Member, Housing for All

== Task forces and commissions ==
Connolly is involved in the following task forces and commissions:

- Bill Sponsor, Entheogenic Plants and Fungi Legalization Task Force
- Bill Sponsor, Public Utilities Ownership Task Force
- Sponsor, Commission to Examine Alcohol Discount Restrictions
- Sponsor, Advisory Panel on Sand Mining and Drinking Water Impact

== Personal life and family ==
Connolly is 6 feet 8 inches tall and played college football at Duke University. He is also a graduate of Boston College Law School.

== See also ==
- List of Democratic Socialists of America who have held office in the United States
- 2019–2020 Massachusetts legislature
- 2021–2022 Massachusetts legislature
