= Mitch Weiss (photographer) =

Mitch Weiss (Photographer)
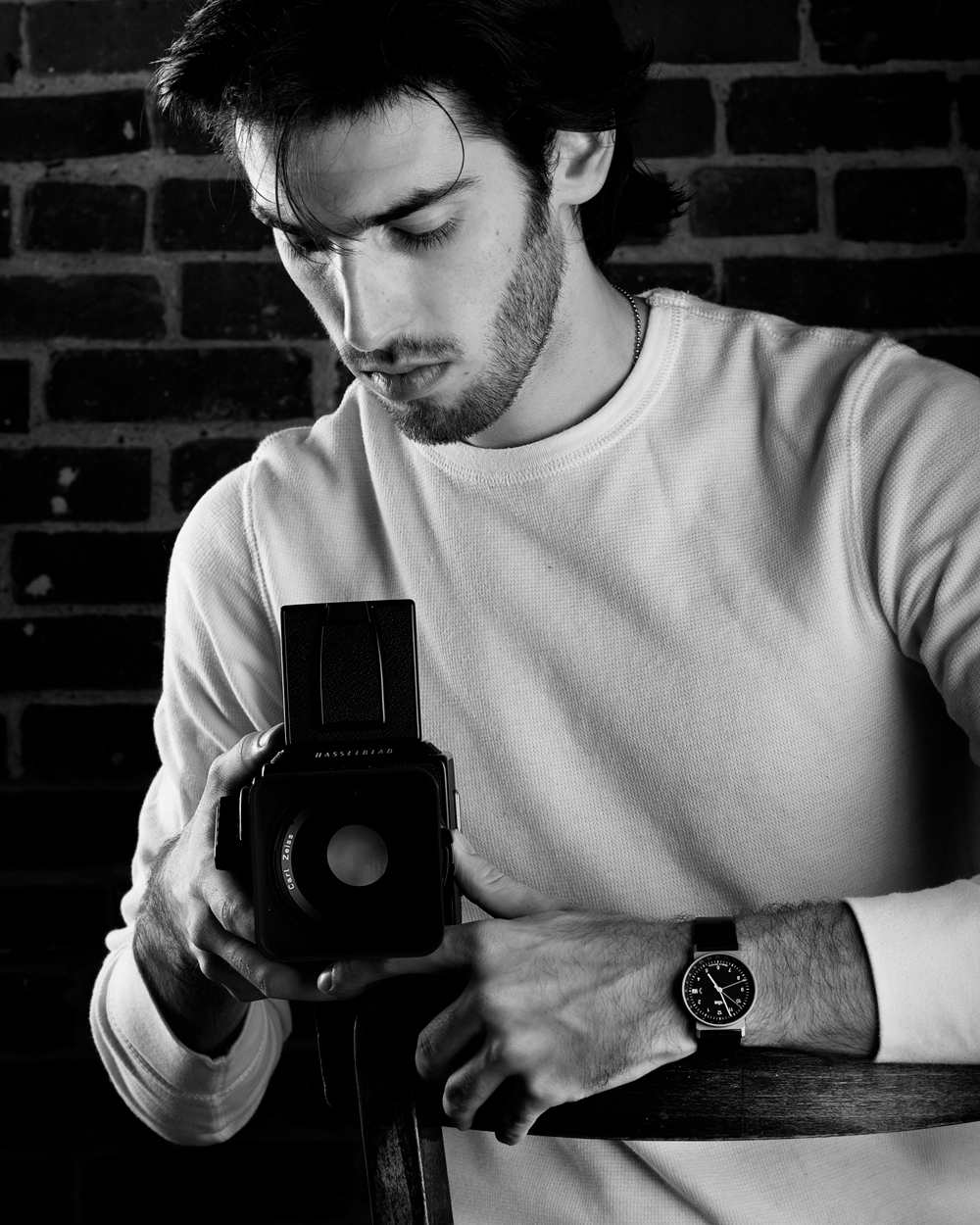
- Born: Mitchell David Weiss; May 4, 1986 (age 40); Brooklyn, New York, United States
- Education: Northeastern University
- Occupations: Photographer and Artist
- Years active: 2005–present
- Website: www.mitchweiss.com

Mitchell D. Weiss (born 1986) is an American photographer, specializing in studio and candid portraiture. Weiss' career has included editorial photography for The Boston Globe, portraiture for national advertising campaigns and art installations for corporate functions. Weiss also served as gallery director of Boston's Piano Factory.

Mitch Weiss graduated from the College of Arts, Media and Design, at Northeastern University, c. 2007.

In 2012, Weiss was one of ten photographers featured in the New England Photographers Group Show at Boston's Flash Forward Festival. That same year, Weiss guest lectured at the Boston Center for Adult Education and Open Show: New York. Weiss was a semifinalist for Hasselblad's 2012 Masters series that celebrates the best in both established and rising photographic talent.

In November 2013, Humble Hues published a book titled Dogs in Thought, which features Mitch Weiss' photographs; benefits went to the MSPCA-Angell and the Animal Rescue League of Boston.

In late 2011, Weiss submitted a 2008 portrait he had taken of Lady Gaga, for auction by ARTcetera on behalf of Boston's AIDS Action Committee. Weiss was interviewed about the photo in the January 2012 issue of e-magazine In Classic Style.

== Select exhibitions ==
- 2011 Rock and Roll – Boston, Griffin Museum of Photography
- 2012 Content Dictates Form - Boston, Gallery at the Piano Factory
- 2012 Flash Forward Festival – Boston
- 2013 Inaugural Exhibition – Los Angeles, Moskowitz Gallery
- 2013 Sister Cities – Boston, Gallery 360

== Book contributions ==
- Dogs in Thought by Mitch Weiss – ISBN 9780989802307 Humble Hues
- Designing a Digital Portfolio: Second Edition by Cynthia L. Baron – Pg No. 36 ISBN 0321637518 New Riders
- Adobe Photoshop Forensics by Cynthia L. Baron – Pg No. 327-336 ISBN 1598634054 Thomson
- Graphic Design Essentials by Joyce Walsh Macario – Pg No. 124 ISBN 0136052355 Pearson Prentice Hall
- 100 Boston Painters by Chawky Frenn – Pg No. 80 ISBN 0764339761 Schiffer Publishing, Ltd.
