= Massachusetts House of Representatives' 26th Middlesex district =

American legislative district

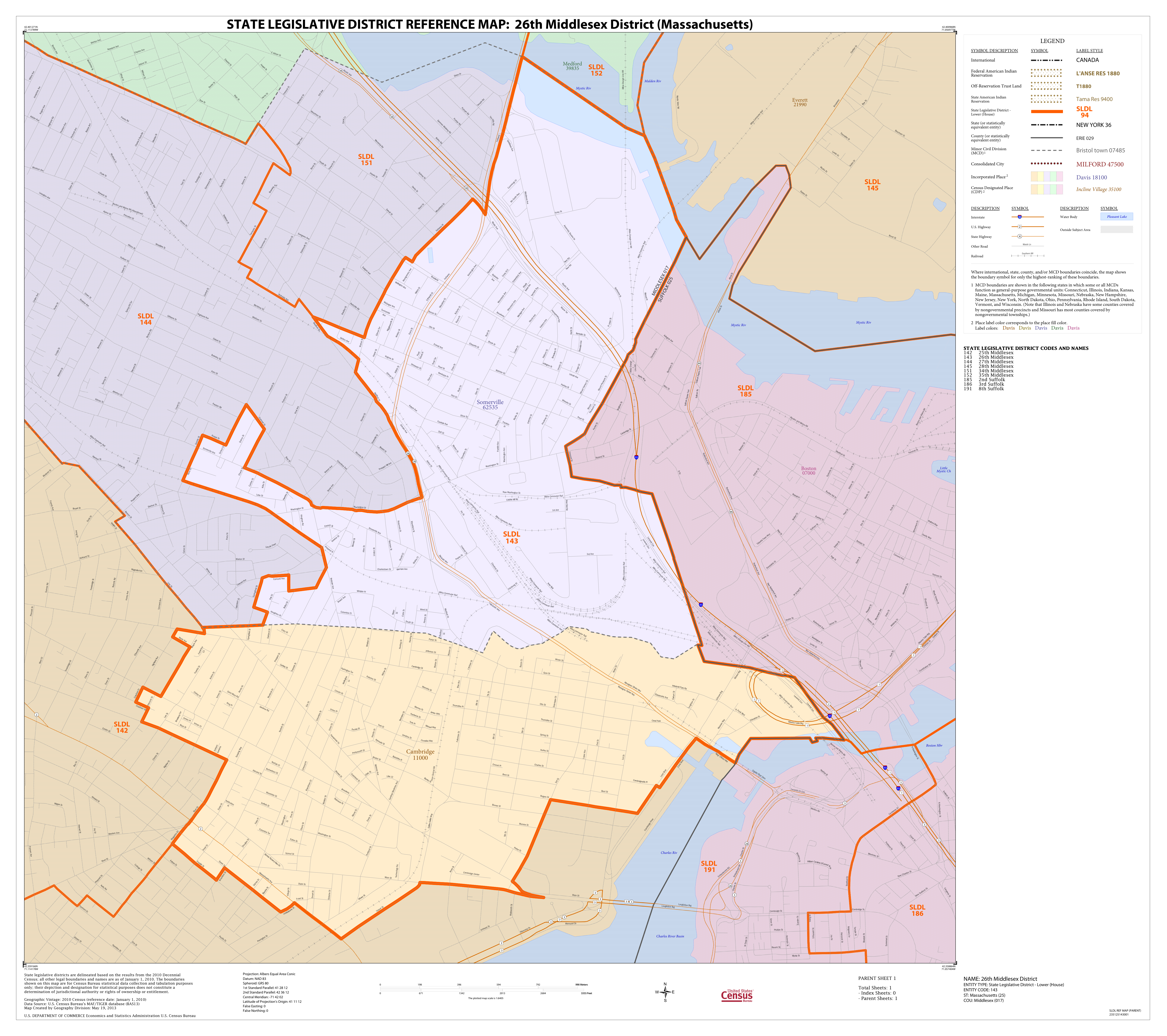
Map of Massachusetts House of Representatives' 26th Middlesex district, based on the 2010 United States census.

Massachusetts House of Representatives' 26th Middlesex district in the United States is one of 160 legislative districts included in the lower house of the Massachusetts General Court. It covers part of Middlesex County. Democrat Mike Connolly of Cambridge has represented the district since 2017.

== Locales represented ==
The district includes the following localities:

- part of Cambridge
- part of Somerville

The current district geographic boundary overlaps with those of the Massachusetts Senate's 2nd Middlesex district and Middlesex and Suffolk district.

=== Former locale ===
The district previously covered part of Lowell, circa 1872.

== Representatives ==
- Eliel Shumway, circa 1858
- Robert P. Woods, circa 1858
- Charles Babbidge, circa 1859
- James P. Longley, circa 1859
- David H. Clark, circa 1888
- Charles H. Brown, circa 1920
- James Morrison, circa 1920
- Rufus Bond, 1935–1938
- Michael Catino, circa 1951
- Thomas J. Doherty, circa 1951
- C. Eugene Farnam, circa 1951
- Edward M. Dickson, circa 1971-1974
- Edward J. Markey, 1975-1976
- John C. McNeil, 1977-1978
- Mary Jane Gibson, 1979-1992
- Anne M. Paulsen, 1993-2002
- Timothy J. Toomey Jr., 2003-2016
- Mike Connolly, 2017-current

== See also ==
- List of Massachusetts House of Representatives elections
- List of Massachusetts General Courts
- List of former districts of the Massachusetts House of Representatives
- Other Middlesex County districts of the Massachusetts House of Representatives: 1st, 2nd, 3rd, 4th, 5th, 6th, 7th, 8th, 9th, 10th, 11th, 12th, 13th, 14th, 15th, 16th, 17th, 18th, 19th, 20th, 21st, 22nd, 23rd, 24th, 25th, 27th, 28th, 29th, 30th, 31st, 32nd, 33rd, 34th, 35th, 36th, 37th

== Legislator portraits ==
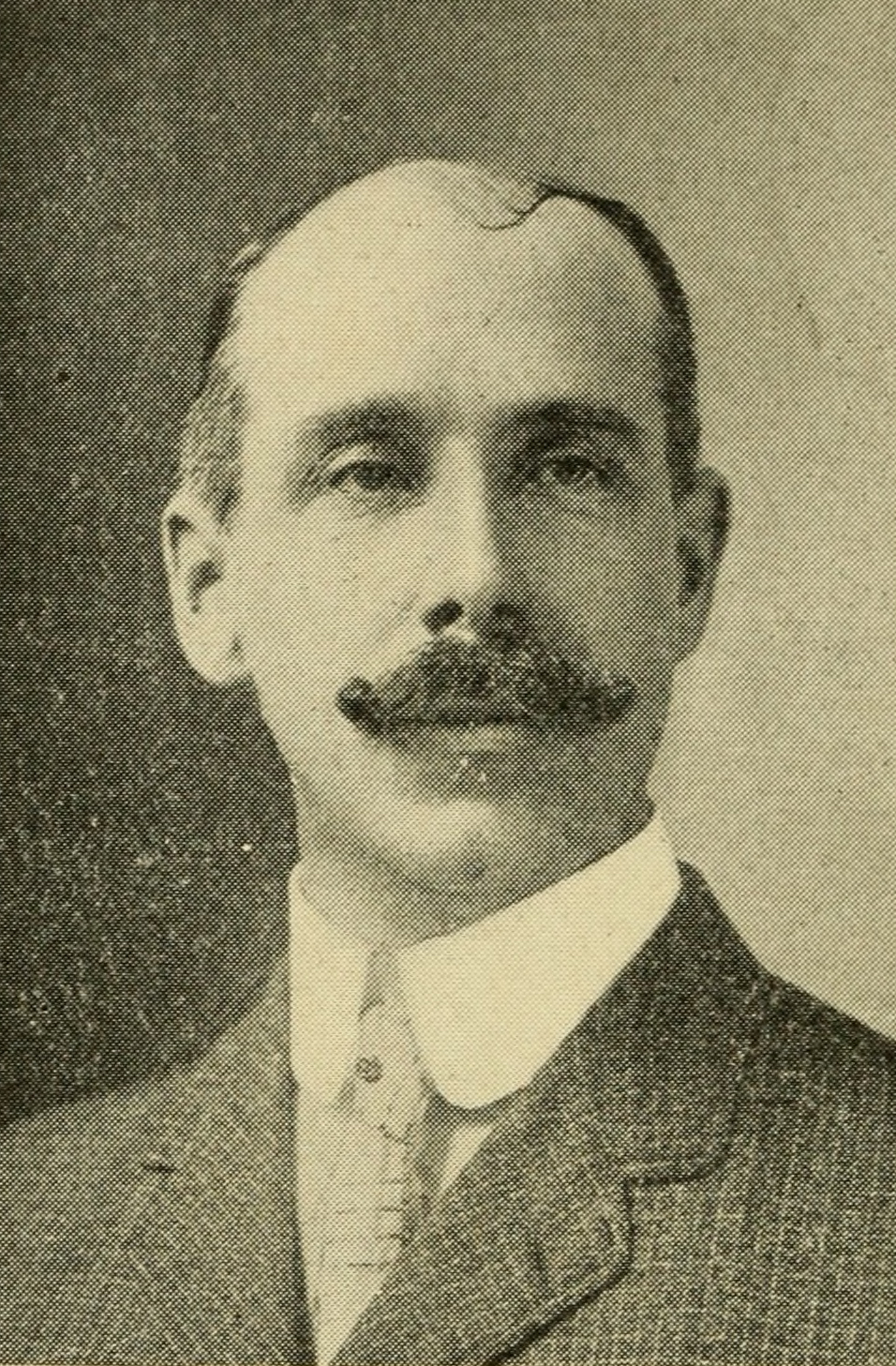
Charles Blanchard

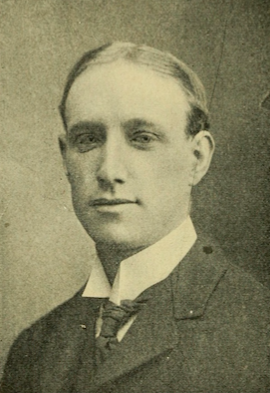
William H. Smith

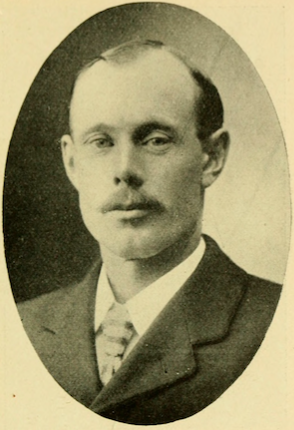
William Waugh

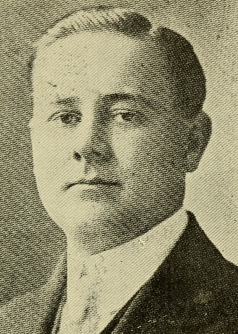
Fred Burrell

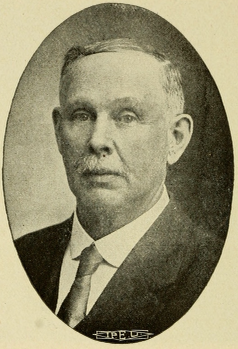
James Morrison

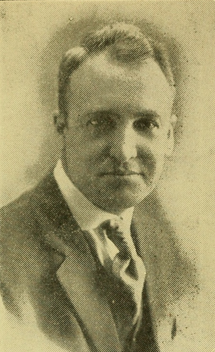
Lewis Hilton Peters

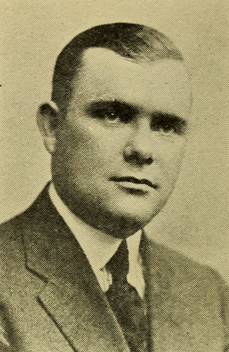
Richard Crockwell

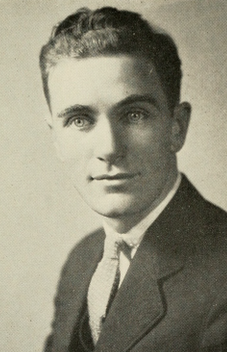
Frederick McDermott

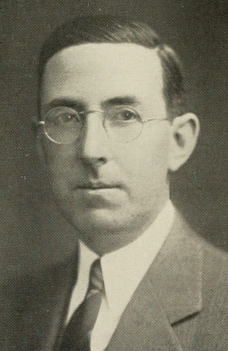
George Hassett

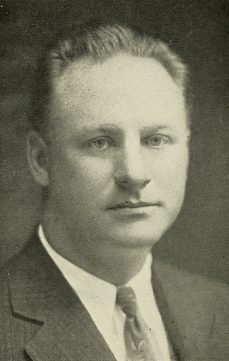
Rufus Bond

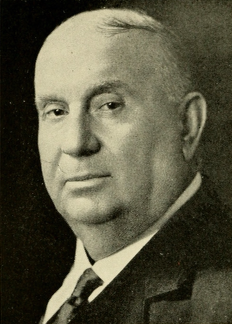
Arthur Youngman

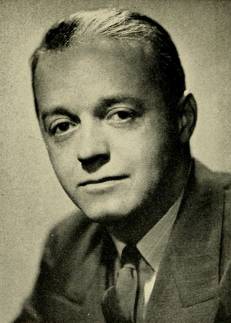
Norman Baxter

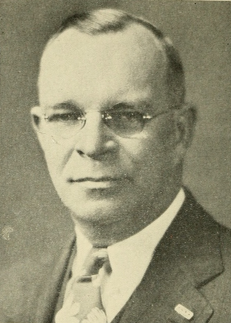
Robert Campbell

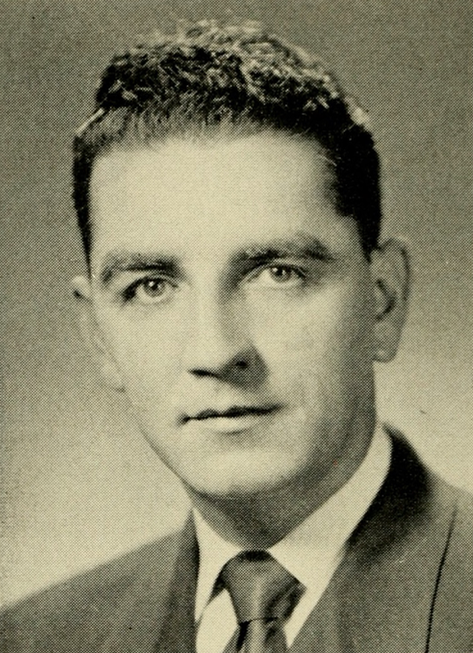
C. Eugene Farnam

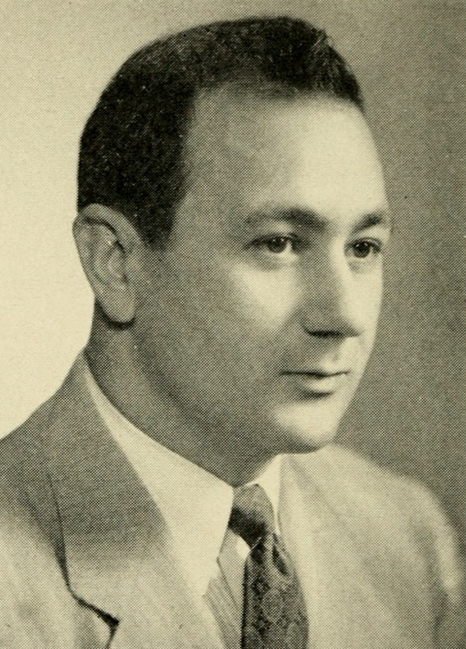
John Zamparelli

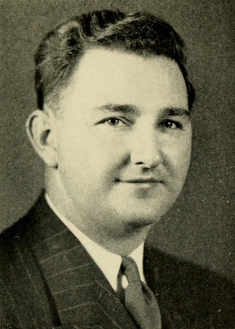
Thomas Doherty

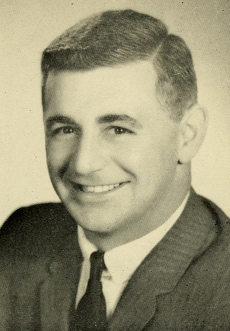
George Sacco

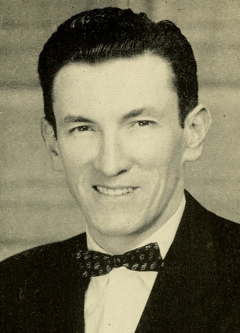
John McGlynn

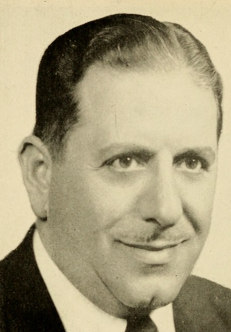
Michael Catino

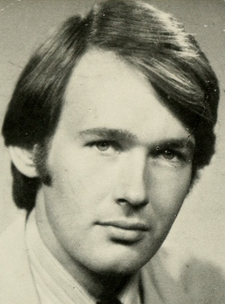
Edward Markey

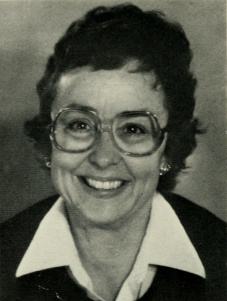
Mary Jane Gibson

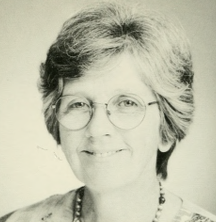
Anne Paulsen

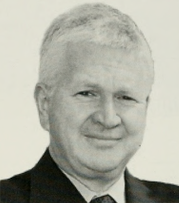
Timothy Toomey

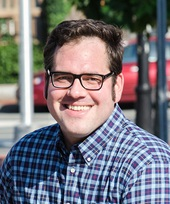
Mike Connolly
