= Carl Sciortino =

American politician

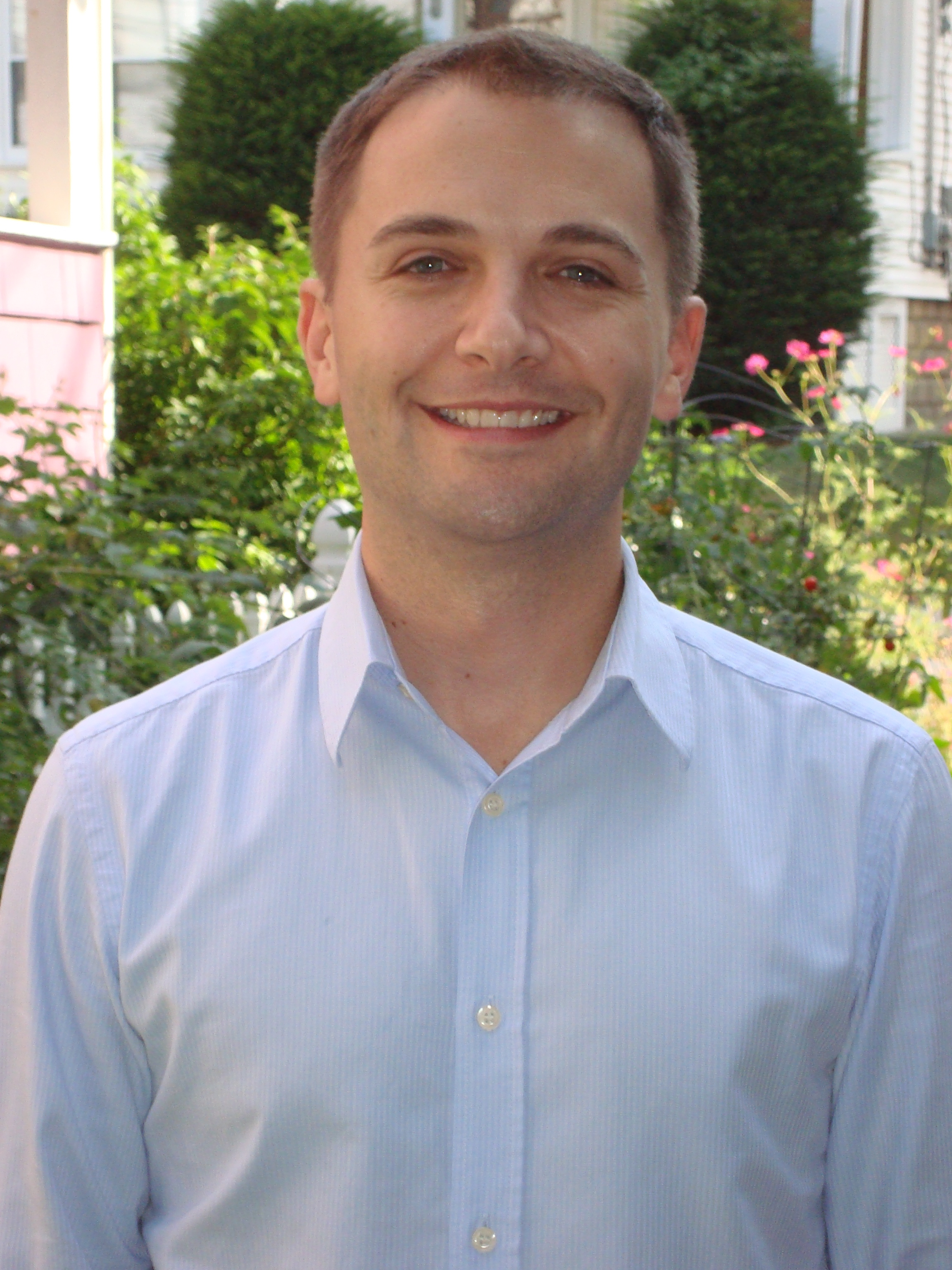

Member of the Massachusetts House of Representatives from the 34th Middlesex district
- In office January 2005 – April 7, 2014
- Preceded by: Vincent Ciampa
- Succeeded by: Christine Barber

Personal details
- Born: July 6, 1978 (age 48)
- Party: Democratic
- Spouse: Francis Pemberton Brown (m. 2013)
- Education: Tufts University (BS); Harvard University (MPA)

Carl Michael Sciortino Jr. (/ʃɔːrˈtiːnoʊ/ shor-TEE-noh; born July 6, 1978) is an American politician serving as executive director of the AIDS Action Committee of Massachusetts. A Democrat from Massachusetts, he represented the 34th Middlesex district in the Massachusetts House of Representatives from 2005 to 2014. The district includes parts of Medford and Somerville. Sciortino was a candidate for the Democratic nomination in the 2013 special election to succeed Ed Markey as a U.S. representative for Massachusetts's 5th district. He lost to Katherine Clark. His campaign’s television commercial with his father, a member of the Tea Party, received national publicity and went viral online.

== Early life ==
Sciortino grew up in Connecticut, where he attended Joseph A. Foran High School. His mother Wendy L. Ralston is a cosmetologist, and his father, Carl M. Sciortino Sr., is a former substance abuse counselor. He received his B.S. in biology from Tufts University in Massachusetts, and a Master of Public Administration degree from Harvard University.

== Massachusetts House of Representatives ==
In the General Court, Sciortino served on the House Ways & Means Committee and the House Committee on Bonding, Capital Expenditures, and State Assets. He also served on the Joint Committee on Public Health and the House Committee on Global Warming and Climate Change. His campaigns have been supported by both MassEquality and the Gay & Lesbian Victory Fund.

Sciortino sponsored legislation on transgender discrimination, HIV lipodystrophy treatment, banning LGBT conversion therapy, housing, transportation, immigration, and education policies.

== Political campaigns ==
2004 election

Sciortino was first elected to the house in 2004, defeating sixteen-year incumbent Democrat Vincent Ciampa in a bitter contest.

Sciortino defeated Ciampa in the Democratic primary by just 93 votes – 51% to 49%. Ciampa, who voted in opposition to same-sex marriage, faced Sciortino, an openly-gay candidate.

After defeating Ciampa in the primary, Sciortino faced no Republican opponent in the general election and his was the only name on the ballot. However, Ciampa launched a write-in campaign to hold on to his seat. Ciampa received 4,254 write-in votes but Sciortino, with 8,889, defeated him by more than two-to-one.

Sciortino’s election win was considered a turning point in the ongoing legislative debates about same-sex marriage in Massachusetts, and was featured in Marc Solomon’s book ‘’Winning Marriage: The Inside Story of How Same-Sex Couples Took on the Politicians and Pundits—and Won’’ and the documentary ‘’Saving Marriage’’.

2008 election

In April 2008, Somerville Alderman Bob Trane announced his intention to challenge Sciortino in the Democratic primary. Both Trane and Sciortino collected the necessary number of signatures to qualify for the ballot but several pages of Sciortino's nomination papers disappeared from his State House office before he had handed them in to the Secretary of State's office. As a result, Sciortino's name did not appear on the Democratic primary ballot, where Trane was listed as the sole candidate. Nevertheless, Sciortino mounted a write-in and sticker campaign, managing to win renomination with 2,678 votes (55 percent) to Trane's 2,217 (45 percent).

2010 election

On 2 November 2010, Sciortino was reelected as the representative for the 34th Middlesex District in the Massachusetts House of Representatives. He stated that, "education reform will...continue to be a priority of [his]" over the coming two year term, along with the Green Line extension to the Medford/Somerville area. Sciortino received 74% of the vote in the 2010 election, defeating independent opponent Richard Cannava.

2012 election

On November 6, 2012, Sciortino was re-elected, receiving 84% of the vote and defeating Republican challenger David Rajczewski. He cited continuing to prioritize "strong public schools, improving public transportation, making health care and housing more affordable, increasing the minimum wage, closing corporate tax loopholes, and ensuring equal opportunities for all."

2013 election

Anticipating that Representative Ed Markey would win the special election to succeed U.S. Senator John Kerry in June, Sciortino announced on February 8, 2013, that he planned to run in the special election to succeed Markey representing the Massachusetts 5th district in Congress. He placed third in the Democratic primary behind eventual winner U.S. Representative Katherine Clark. Sciortino’s television commercial received national publicity for showing him, a self-identified “Massachusetts liberal,” in a playful contrast to his conservative father.

== Resignation ==
Sciortino, who is HIV-positive, resigned effective April 7, 2014, to take a position as Executive Director of the AIDS Action Committee of Massachusetts.

== Personal life ==
Sciortino married Francis "Pem" Brown, a political strategy consultant, on October 5, 2013 in Boston.
