= Anne Paulsen =

American politician

Anne Marie Paulsen
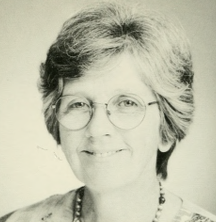
- 1995 portrait of Paulsen

Member of the Massachusetts House of Representatives from the 24th Middlesex district
- In office 2003–2007

Member of the Massachusetts House of Representatives from the 26th Middlesex district
- In office 1993–2002

Personal details
- Born: August 8, 1936 (age 89) Boston, Massachusetts
- Party: Democratic

Anne Marie Paulsen (born August 8, 1936 in Boston, Massachusetts) is an American Democratic Party (United States) politician from Belmont, Massachusetts. Paulsen served from 1993 to 2006.

== Career ==
She represented the Massachusetts House of Representatives' 26th Middlesex district in the Massachusetts House of Representatives from 1993 to 2002. She later represented the Massachusetts House of Representatives' 24th Middlesex district in the Massachusetts House of Representatives from 2003 to 2007. Later she served as Democratic Party State Committee Woman.

== See also ==
- 1993–1994 Massachusetts legislature
- 1995–1996 Massachusetts legislature
- 1997–1998 Massachusetts legislature
- 1999–2000 Massachusetts legislature
- 2001–2002 Massachusetts legislature
- 2003–2004 Massachusetts legislature
- 2005–2006 Massachusetts legislature
