= Massachusetts House of Representatives' 17th Suffolk district =

American legislative district

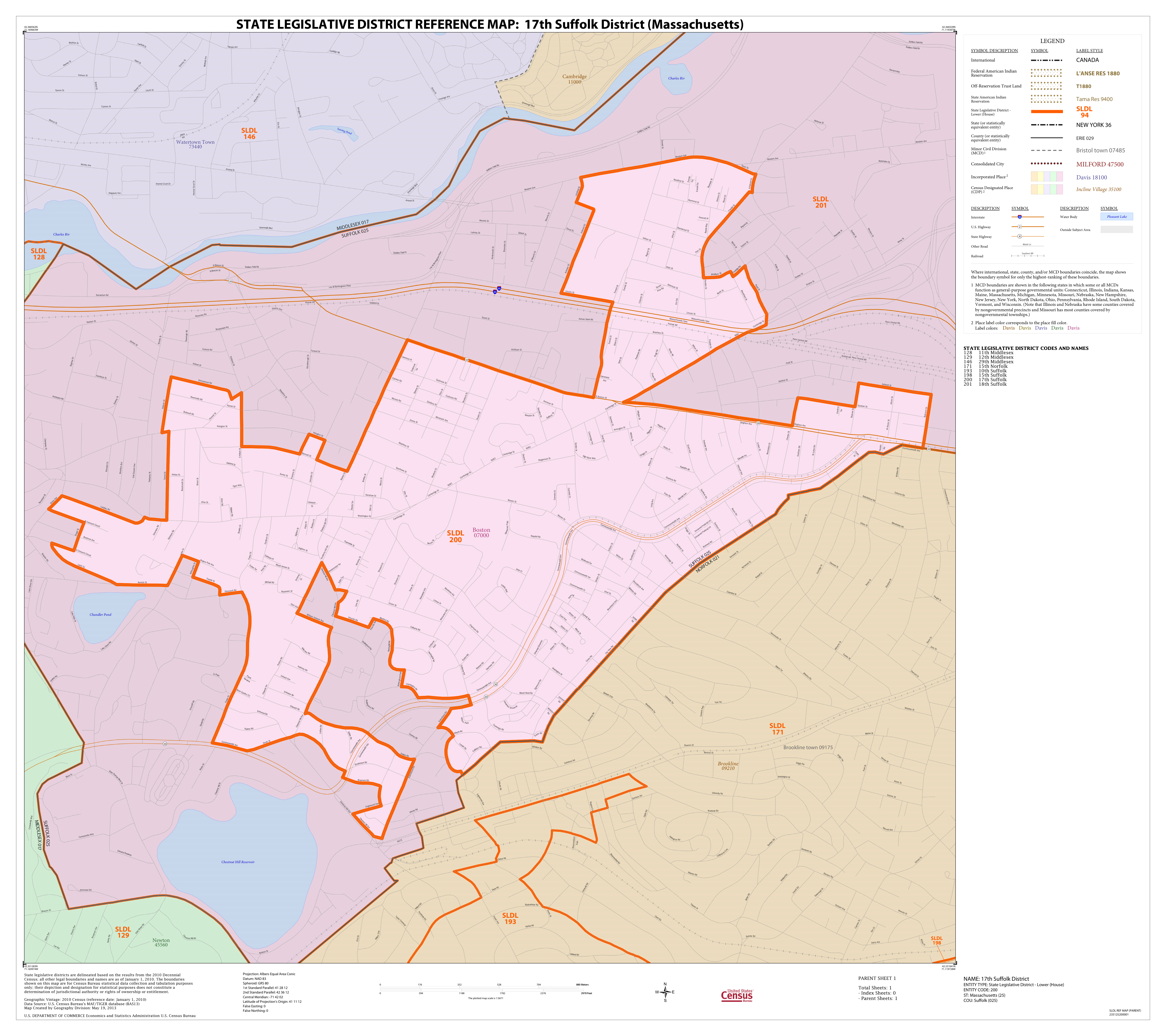
Map of Massachusetts House of Representatives' 17th Suffolk district, based on the 2010 United States census.

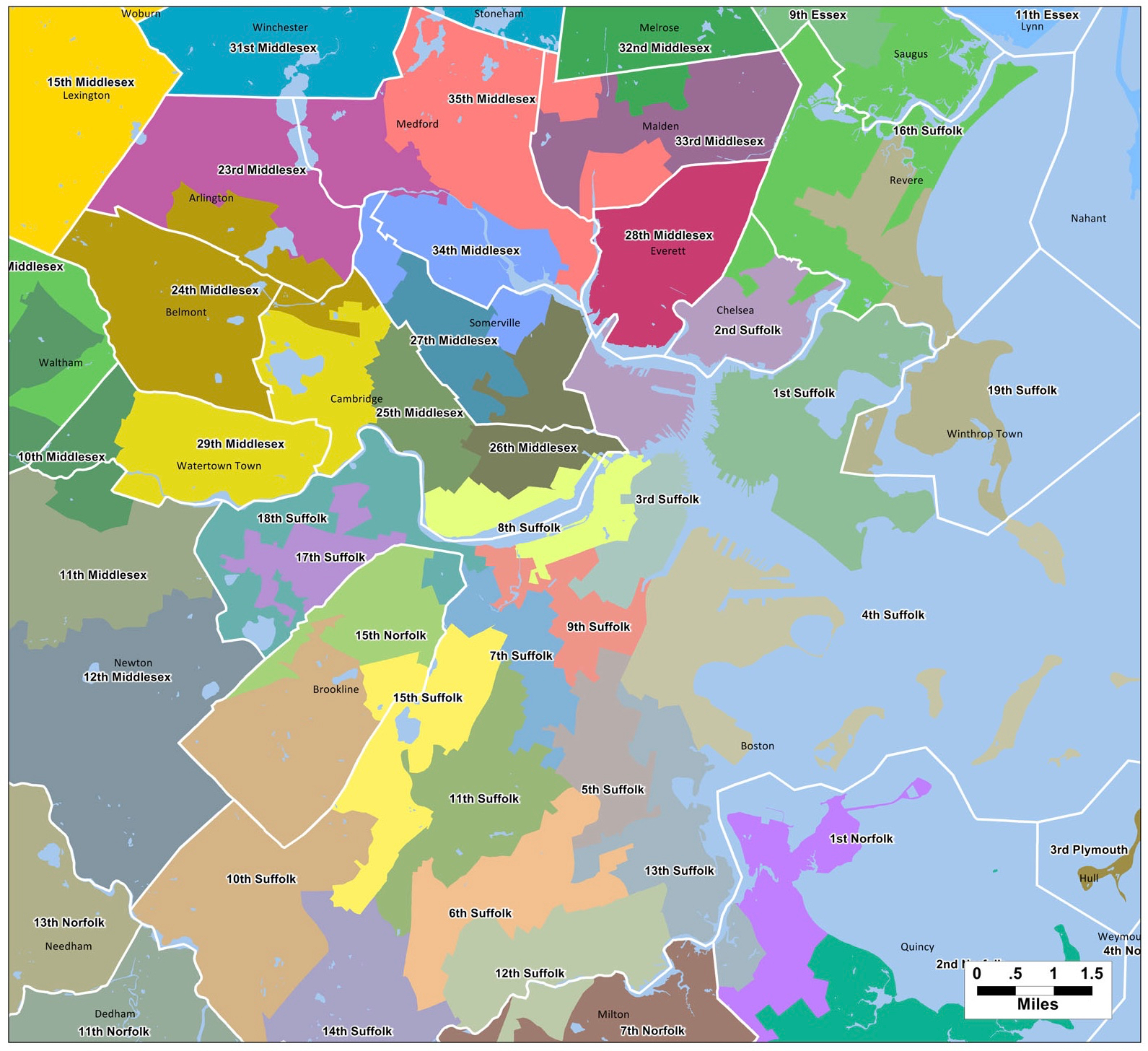
Map of Massachusetts House of Representatives districts for Suffolk County, apportioned in 2011

Massachusetts House of Representatives' 17th Suffolk district in the United States is one of 160 legislative districts included in the lower house of the Massachusetts General Court. It covers part of the city of Boston in Suffolk County. Since 1995, Kevin G. Honan of the Democratic Party has represented the district.

The current district geographic boundary overlaps with those of the Massachusetts Senate's Middlesex and Suffolk district and 2nd Suffolk and Middlesex district.

== Representatives ==
- Frederick Sheenan
- James Conboy
- Daniel Murphy
- Joseph McGrath
- Coleman Kelly
- Patrick Sullivan
- Thomas Dorgan
- John Wickes
- Charles Louis Patrone
- James A. Burke
- Michael Paul Feeney
- John F. Melia
- Michael Daly
- Daniel Pokaski
- Kevin Fitzgerald
- Kevin Honan

== See also ==
- List of Massachusetts House of Representatives elections
- List of Massachusetts General Courts
- List of former districts of the Massachusetts House of Representatives

== Images ==
Portraits of legislators

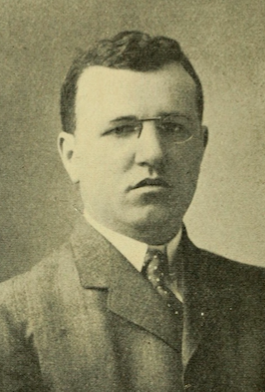
Frederick Sheenan

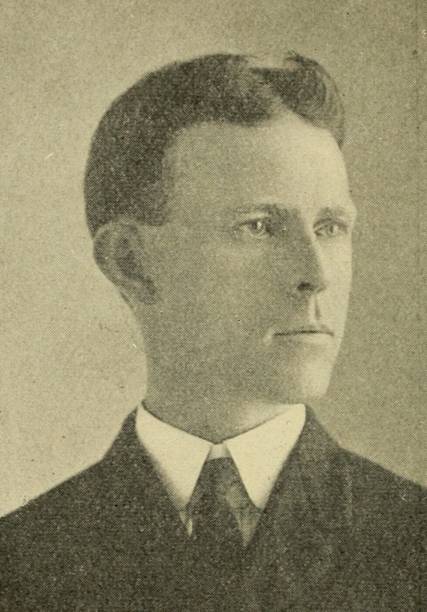
James Conboy

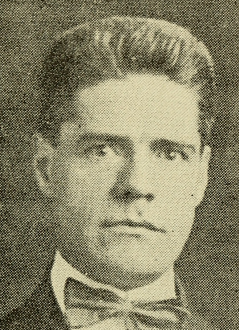
Daniel Murphy

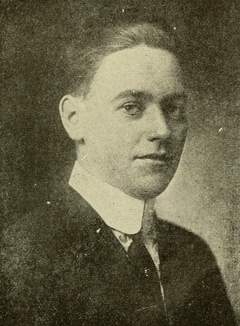
Joseph McGrath

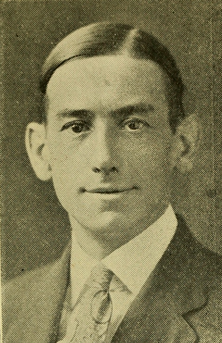
Coleman Kelly

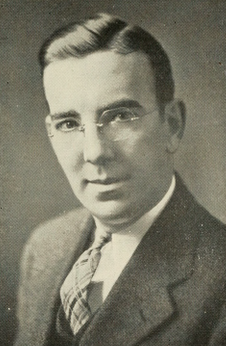
Patrick Sullivan

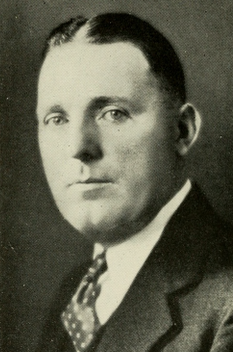
Thomas Dorgan

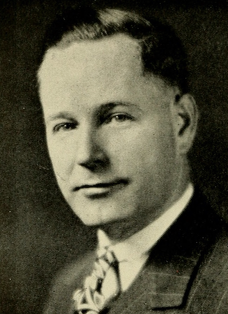
John Wickes

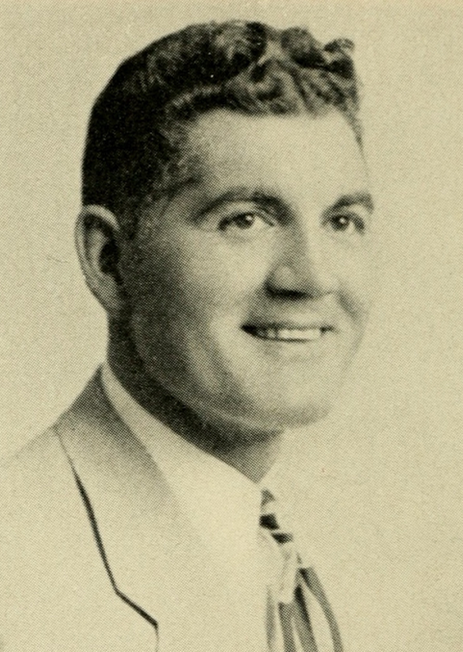
Charles Louis Patrone

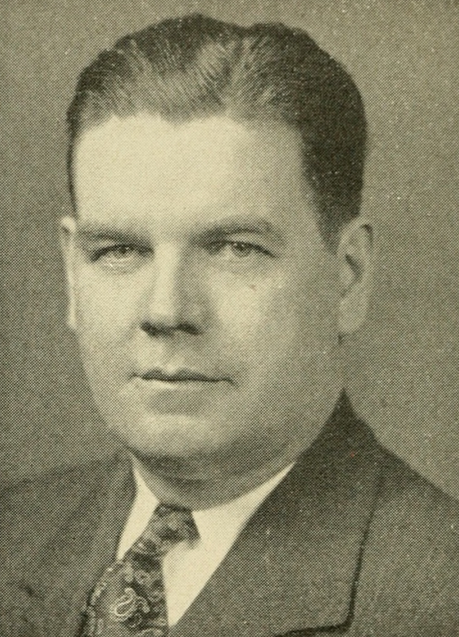
James Anthony Burke

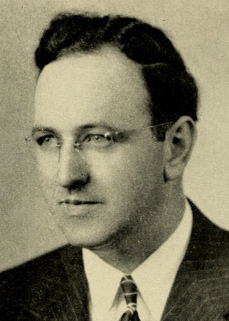
Michael Paul Feeney

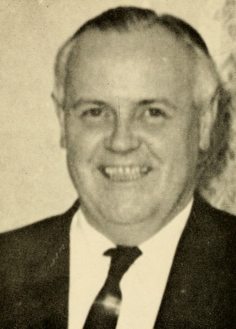
John Melia

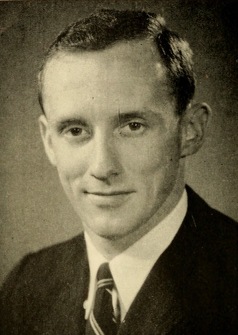
Michael Daly

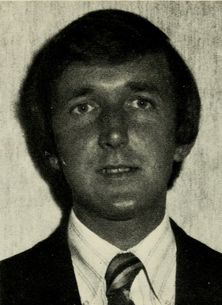
Daniel Pokaski

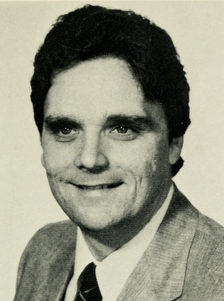
Kevin Fitzgerald

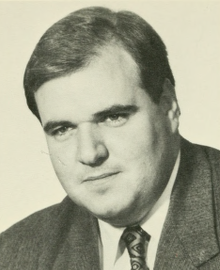
Kevin Honan
