= Mary Jane Gibson =

American politician

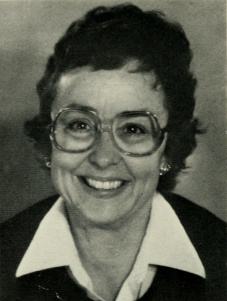

Member of the Massachusetts House of Representatives from the 26th Middlesex district
- In office 1979–1993

Mary Jane Gibson is an American Democratic politician from Belmont, Massachusetts. She represented the 26th Middlesex district in the Massachusetts House of Representatives from 1979 to 1993.

== See also ==
- 1979-1980 Massachusetts legislature
