= Kevin Honan =

American politician

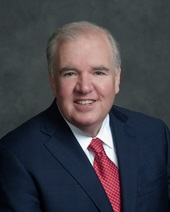

Member of the Massachusetts House of Representatives
- Incumbent
- Assumed office 1987
- Preceded by: Tom Gallagher
- Constituency: 18th Suffolk (1987–95); 17th Suffolk (1995–)

Personal details
- Born: June 5, 1958 (age 68) Boston, Massachusetts, U.S.

Kevin G. Honan is an American politician who has served as a member of the Massachusetts House of Representatives for the 17th Suffolk district since 1987. A resident of the Brighton neighborhood of Boston and a member of the Democratic Party, Honan is the House's longest continuously serving legislator.

== Education ==
Honan graduated from Boston College with a bachelor's degree in political science and government in 1981.

Since joining the legislature in 1987, he has received a master's degree in management sciences from Lesley College in 1991 and a Master of Public Administration from the John F. Kennedy School of Government in 1999.

== Political career ==
Honan was first elected to the House of Representatives in 1986, defeating Carol Wolfe, an administrator for the neighborhood Community District Advisory Council and proponent of school desegregation, and Francis Xavier Griffin.

Honan was unopposed in every primary and general election from 1988 to 2018.

His closest race came in the 2020 Democratic primary, when he defeated progressive challenger Jordan Meehan with 54% of the vote. He was unopposed in the general election and has not faced an opponent in any subsequent election.

=== Issues ===
==== Housing ====
As chairman of the Joint Committee on Housing, a position he held for seventeen years, Honan oversaw significant legislation aimed at expanding affordable housing, including a $1.8 billion bond bill in 2018 to increase housing production and preserve housing affordability.

==== COVID-19 pandemic ====
In April 2020, Honan co-sponsored an eviction and foreclosure moratorium that, upon its passage, became the first of its kind in the nation during the COVID-19 pandemic. The bill protected residents from being evicted from or foreclosed on their homes during the state's COVID-19 emergency declaration.

=== Committee assignments ===
- Chairperson, House Committee on Steering, Policy and Scheduling

== Personal life ==
Honan resides in Brighton with his wife Colleen and his daughter Molly.

== See also ==
- 2019–2020 Massachusetts legislature
- 2021–2022 Massachusetts legislature
- Massachusetts House of Representatives' 17th Suffolk district
