= Massachusetts House of Representatives' 34th Middlesex district =

American legislative district

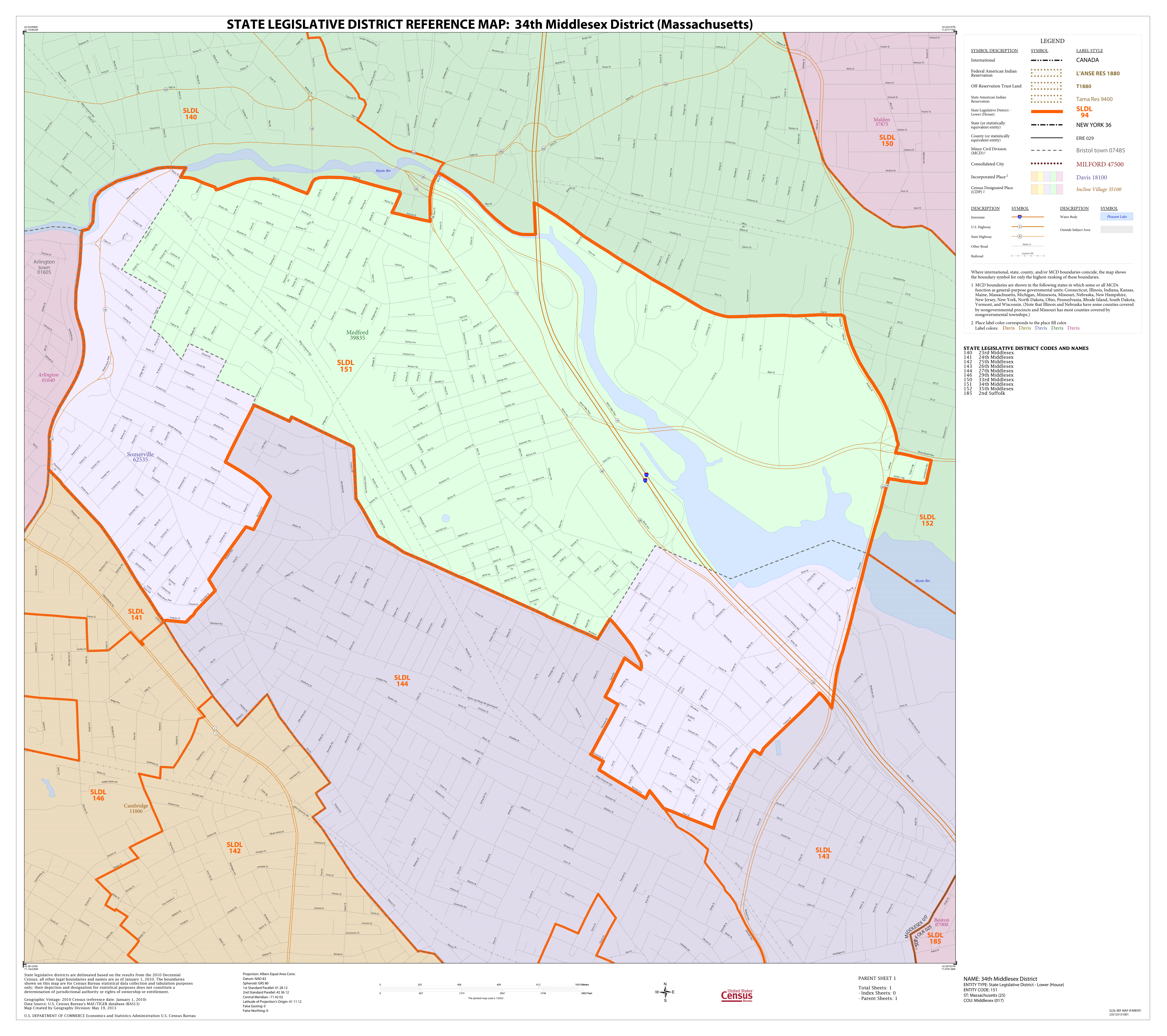
Map of Massachusetts House of Representatives' 34th Middlesex district, based on the 2010 United States census.

Massachusetts House of Representatives' 34th Middlesex district in the United States is one of 160 legislative districts included in the lower house of the Massachusetts General Court. It covers part of Medford and part of Somerville in Middlesex County. Since 2015, Christine P. Barber of the Democratic Party has represented the district.

The current district geographic boundary overlaps with that of the Massachusetts Senate's 2nd Middlesex district.

== Representatives ==
- Paul C. Casey
- Vincent Paul Ciampa
- Carl M. Sciortino, Jr.
- Christine P. Barber, 2015–current

== See also ==
- List of Massachusetts House of Representatives elections
- List of Massachusetts General Courts
- Other Middlesex County districts of the Massachusetts House of Representatives: 1st, 2nd, 3rd, 4th, 5th, 6th, 7th, 8th, 9th, 10th, 11th, 12th, 13th, 14th, 15th, 16th, 17th, 18th, 19th, 20th, 21st, 22nd, 23rd, 24th, 25th, 26th, 27th, 28th, 29th, 30th, 31st, 32nd, 33rd, 35th, 36th, 37th
- List of former districts of the Massachusetts House of Representatives

== Images ==
Portraits of legislators

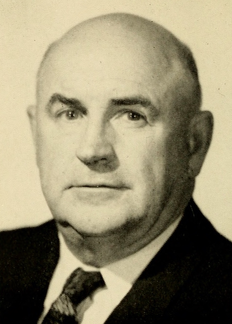
Fred Cain

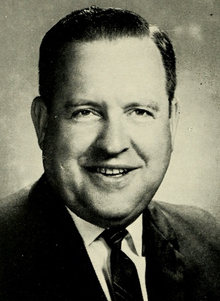
Robert Vigneau

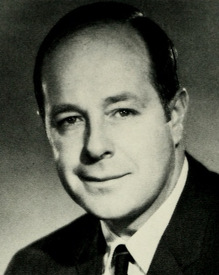
Sherman Saltmarsh

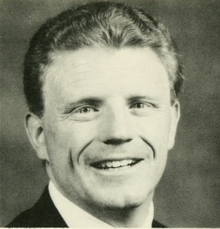
Paul Casey

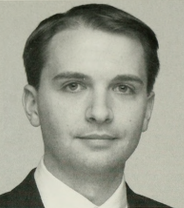
Carl Sciortino
