= 2010 United States ballot measures =

- 2010

Part of the 2010 United States elections

The following is a list of ballot measures which appeared on the ballot in the United States in 2010.

== By state ==
=== Arizona ===
- 2010 Arizona Proposition 100
- 2010 Arizona Proposition 203

=== California ===
- 2010 California Proposition 13
- 2010 California Proposition 14
- 2010 California Proposition 15
- 2010 California Proposition 16
- 2010 California Proposition 17
- 2010 California Proposition 19
- 2010 California Proposition 20
- 2010 California Proposition 23
- 2010 California Proposition 27

=== Colorado ===
- 2010 Colorado Amendment 62

=== Illinois ===
- Illinois Governor Recall Amendment

=== Massachusetts ===
- 2010 Massachusetts Question 2
- 2010 Massachusetts Question 1
- Massachusetts Sales Tax Relief Act

=== Michigan ===
- 2010 Michigan Proposal 1
- 2010 Michigan Proposal 2

=== Oklahoma ===
- 2010 Oklahoma State Question 755

=== Oregon ===
- 2010 Oregon Ballot Measures 66 and 67
- 2010 Oregon Ballot Measures 68 and 69

== By territory ==
=== American Samoa ===
- 2010 American Samoan constitutional referendum
