= 2010 Massachusetts elections =

2010 Massachusetts general election
- November 2, 2010

Part of the 2010 United States elections

The Massachusetts general election, 2010 was held on November 2, 2010 throughout Massachusetts. Primary elections took place on September 14, 2010.

== Governor and Lieutenant Governor ==
Governor Deval Patrick and Lieutenant Governor Tim Murray sought re-election. Republicans nominated former Harvard Pilgrim Health Care CEO Charlie Baker for Governor and Senate Minority Leader Richard Tisei for Lieutenant Governor. State Treasurer Tim Cahill left the Democratic Party in September 2009 ran as an independent candidate.

Patrick and Murray were re-elected to a second term in office.

== Secretary of the Commonwealth ==
Democratic incumbent William F. Galvin sought re-election. Republicans nominated Woburn City Clerk William Campbell. Galvin was also challenged by independent candidate James D. Henderson.

=== General election ===
Galvin was re-elected to a fourth term in office with 64% of the vote.

Massachusetts Secretary of the Commonwealth Election, 2010
Party	Candidate	Votes	%	±%
Democratic	William F. Galvin (incumbent)	1,420,481	64.34%	
Republican	William Campbell	720,967	32.70%	
Independent	James D. Henderson	61,812	2.80%	
Write-in		1,424	0.16%	

== Attorney General ==
2010 Massachusetts Attorney General election
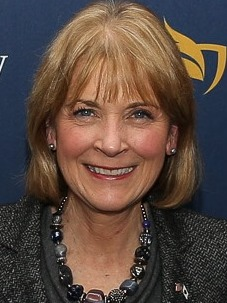

Nominee	Martha Coakley	Jim McKenna
Party	Democratic	Republican
Popular vote	1,417,538	839,274
Percentage	62.7%	37.1%
- Coakley: 40–50% 50–60% 60–70% 70–80% 80–90% McKenna: 50–60% 60–70%
Attorney General before election
Martha Coakley
Democratic
Elected Attorney General
Martha Coakley
Democratic

Incumbnent Attorney General Martha Coakley was re-elected.

=== Republican primary ===
The Republicans did not formally endorse a candidate at their state convention. Nevertheless, two late entry candidates, Jim McKenna, and Guy Carbone entered the campaign as write-in candidates. James McKenna received 27,711 certified write-in votes, which was a United States and Massachusetts electoral record.

==== Results ====
Massachusetts Attorney General Republican Primary, 2010
Party	Candidate	Votes	%	±%
Republican	Jim McKenna (Write-in)	27,711	54.38%	
Republican	Guy Carbone (Write-in)	9,505	18.66%	
Other		13,734	26.96%	

=== General election ===
Coakley was re-elected.

Massachusetts Attorney General Election, 2010
Party	Candidate	Votes	%	±%
Democratic	Martha Coakley (incumbent)	1,417,538	62.76%	
Republican	Jim McKenna	839,274	37.16%	
Write-in		1,981	0.08%	

== Treasurer ==
2010 Massachusetts Treasurer and Receiver-General election
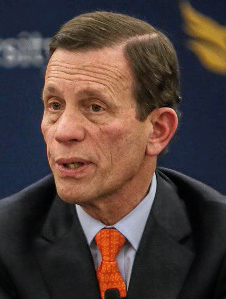

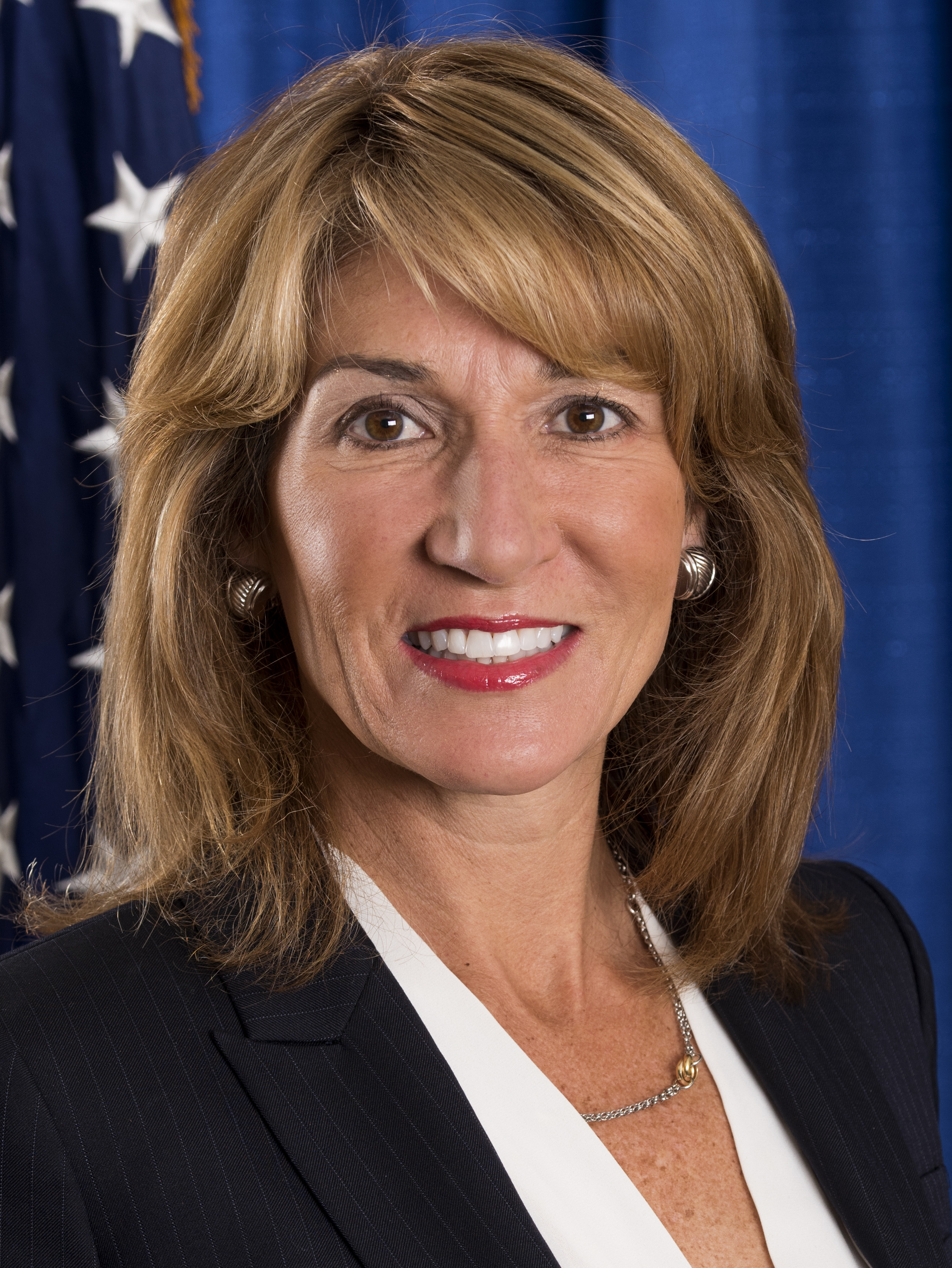
Nominee	Steve Grossman	Karyn Polito
Party	Democratic	Republican
Popular vote	1,208,098	993,127
Percentage	54.8%	45.1%
- Grossman: 40–50% 50–60% 60–70% 70–80% 80–90% Polito: 50–60% 60–70% 70–80%
Treasurer before election
Tim Cahill
Democratic
Elected Treasurer
Steve Grossman
Democratic

Treasurer Tim Cahill retired to run for governor as an independent.

=== Democratic primary ===
Former Democratic National Committee National Chairman Steve Grossman won the Democratic primary against Boston City Councilor Stephen J. Murphy, and was opposed by Republican State Representative Karyn Polito (of Shrewsbury) in the general election.

==== Results ====
Massachusetts Treasurer Democratic Primary, 2010
Party	Candidate	Votes	%	±%
Democratic	Steve Grossman	245,386	60.78	
Democratic	Stephen J. Murphy	157,284	38.96	
Write-in		1,071	0.26	

=== General election ===
Massachusetts Treasurer Election, 2010
Party	Candidate	Votes	%	±%
Democratic	Steve Grossman	1,208,098	54.84	
Republican	Karyn Polito	993,127	45.08	
Write-in		1,784	0.08	

== Auditor ==
2010 Massachusetts Auditor election
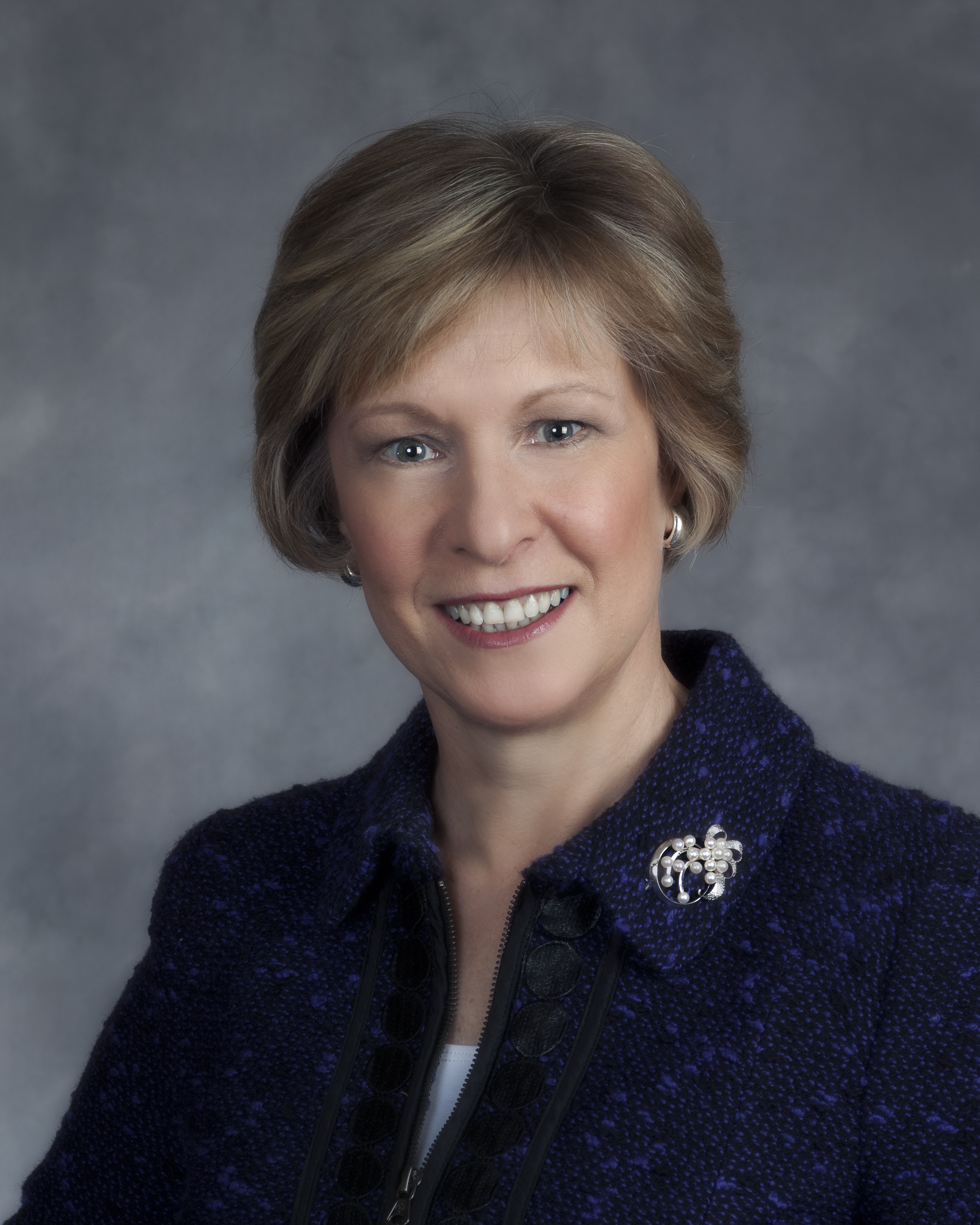

Nominee	Suzanne Bump	Mary Z. Connaughton	Nathanael Fortune
Party	Democratic	Republican	Green-Rainbow
Popular vote	1,027,710	982,113	108,997
Percentage	48.5%	46.3%	5.1%
Treasurer before election
A. Joseph DeNucci
Democratic
Elected Treasurer
Suzanne Bump
Democratic

Auditor Joe DeNucci retired.

=== Republican primary ===
==== Candidates ====
- Mary Z. Connaughton, former board member of the Massachusetts Turnpike Authority
- Kamal Jain, Libertarian nominee for Auditor in 2002

==== Results ====
Massachusetts Auditor Republican Primary, 2010
Party	Candidate	Votes	%	±%
Republican	Mary Z. Connaughton	176,864	86.30%	
Republican	Kamal Jain	27,017	13.20%	
Write-in		848	0.41%	

=== Democratic primary ===
==== Candidates ====
- Suzanne Bump, former Secretary of Labor and Workforce Development
- Guy Glodis, Worcester County Sheriff
- Mike Lake

==== Results ====
Democratic primary results

Massachusetts Auditor Democratic Primary, 2010
Party	Candidate	Votes	%	±%
Democratic	Suzanne Bump	198,984	49.41%	
Democratic	Guy Glodis	125,974	31.28%	
Democratic	Mike Lake	76,764	19.06%	
Write-in		1,027	0.26%	

=== General election ===
Nathanael Fortune, the Green-Rainbow Party nominee, also appeared on the November ballot.

Massachusetts Auditor Election, 2010
Party	Candidate	Votes	%	±%
Democratic	Suzanne Bump	1,027,710	48.45%	
Republican	Mary Z. Connaughton	982,113	46.30%	
Green-Rainbow	Nathanael Fortune	108,997	5.14%	
Write-in		2,186	0.10%	

== United States Senate ==
Neither of Massachusetts's two seats in the United States Senate was up for election in the 2010 general election. In January 2010, Republican Scott Brown won a special election to fill the seat of Ted Kennedy.

== United States House of Representatives ==
All of Massachusetts's ten seats in the United States House of Representatives are up for election in 2010. All of the incumbent Representatives are seeking re-election, with the exception of Bill Delahunt of District 10. Massachusetts is expected to lose one congressional seat in the redistricting that will follow the 2010 census.

== State Legislature ==
=== Massachusetts Senate ===
All 40 seats in the Massachusetts Senate were up for election in 2010.

=== Massachusetts House of Representatives ===
All 160 seats in the Massachusetts House of Representatives were up for election in 2010.

== Ballot measures ==
There were three statewide ballot questions, all initiatives. Question 1 passed, but Questions 2 and 3 failed.

Question 1 repealed the sales tax on alcohol. Question 2 would have repealed an affordable housing statute. Question 3 would have lowered the sales tax rate.

Question No.	Subject	Description	Result	Yes	No
1	Taxes	Sales tax eliminated for alcohol sales in the state	Yes	52%	48%
2	Housing initiatives	Repeal a housing law	No	42%	58%
3	Taxes	Roll 6.25% sales tax back to 3%	No	43%	57%

== County ==
Counties in Massachusetts will elect County Commissioners, District Attorneys, and Sheriffs.
