= Steven S. Howitt =

American politician

Steven Howitt
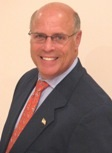

Member of the Massachusetts House of Representatives from the 4th Bristol district
- Incumbent
- Assumed office 2011
- Preceded by: Steven D'Amico

Personal details
- Party: Republican
- Spouse: Pamela Tesler Howitt
- Education: Boston University School of Management
- Occupation: Legislator

Steven S. Howitt is the current member of the Massachusetts House of Representatives for the 4th Bristol district.

== Committee Assignments ==
For the 2025-26 Session, Howitt sits on the following committees in the House:

- Ranking Minority, Joint Committee on Transportation
- House Committee on Ethics
- House Committee on Steering, Policy and Scheduling
- Joint Committee on Consumer Protection and Professional Licensure
- Joint Committee on Telecommunications, Utilities and Energy
