= Jack Patrick Lewis =

American politician

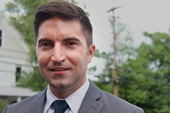

Member of the Massachusetts House of Representatives from the 7th Middlesex district
- Incumbent
- Assumed office January 4, 2017
- Preceded by: Tom Sannicandro

Personal details
- Party: Democratic
- Spouse: Brent Lewis
- Children: 3
- Education: University of Utah (B.A.); Eden Theological Seminary (M.Div.)
- Profession: Minister; Nonprofit executive director
- Website: www.electjacklewis.com

Jack Patrick Lewis is an American state legislator from Framingham, Massachusetts. A Democrat, he was sworn in as a member of the Massachusetts House of Representatives on January 4, 2017.

After earning the Democratic nomination on September 8, 2016, Lewis became representative-elect on November 8, earning over 61% of the vote.

In addition to his political involvement, Lewis has served as the executive director of OUTMetro West, a nonprofit working with at-risk LGBT youth, and as assistant minister and director of religious education at the Unitarian Universalist Society of Wellesley Hills.

== Early life and education ==
Lewis's father is a retired manufacturing worker and longtime member of the United Automobile Workers (UAW); his mother is a retired preschool teacher in the Head Start program. He grew up in Seville, Ohio.

Lewis attended the University of Utah with the support of a UAW scholarship. He triple majored in political science (honors), Middle East studies/Arabic, and international studies, and graduated as the valedictorian of his divisional college. He also attended Eden Theological Seminary, where he received a master of divinity.

== Professional life ==
Lewis began his political career while in college, serving as an organizer for Howard Dean's 2004 presidential campaign. He has worked as a HeadStart substitute teacher, taught English in Ghana and Egypt, and worked in a group home for people with disabilities. After receiving his M.Div., Lewis served as assistant minister and director of religious education at the Unitarian Universalist Society of Wellesley Hills in Wellesley, Massachusetts.

After several years at the congregation, Lewis stepped down to become a founding member of Out MetroWest, a nonprofit organization providing services for at-risk LGBT youth. During Lewis' tenure as executive director, Out MetroWest worked with over 700 teens, focusing on supportive counseling and community education. In June 2016, Lewis' work at Out MetroWest was honored with a Nonprofit Excellence Award (Young Professional category) from the Massachusetts Nonprofit Network.

== Political career ==
=== Campaign for State Representative ===
The Seventh Middlesex district includes all of Ashland, Massachusetts, as well as Framingham precincts 8, 13, 14, 16, 17, and 18.

On January 19, 2016, Lewis announced his candidacy for state representative. He ran for the Democratic nomination on a progressive platform, pledging his enthusiastic support for an increased minimum wage, stronger environmental protections, and a renewed commitment to diversity and community life. He was endorsed by numerous progressive organizations, including MassAlliance, Progressive Massachusetts, and the United Automobile Workers (Region 9). Lewis faced prosecutor Brett Walker and former selectman Philip Jack, both of Ashland, in the Democratic primary. On September 8, Lewis became the Democratic nominee, carrying 37% of the vote (~3% higher than the nearest candidate).

Lewis faced Republican Yolanda Greaves in the general election. He was supported by numerous local leaders, including state representative Tom Sannicandro, state senator Karen Spilka, state representative Chris Walsh, and state representative Carmine Gentile. He also received the support of several federal officeholders, including congresswoman Katherine Clark and senators Elizabeth Warren and Edward Markey. He also received the overwhelming support of labor unions and pro-choice organizations. On November 8, he was elected with 61.8% of the vote, a margin of 4,263 votes (~29% higher than the nearest candidate).

=== State Representative (2017-present) ===
Lewis was sworn in as a member of the Massachusetts House of Representatives on Wednesday, January 4, 2017.

On February 22, 2017, Lewis received his committee assignments, which local press praised as "consistent with the platform he campaigned on."

==== Committee assignments ====
- Joint Committee on Children, Families and Persons with Disabilities
- Joint Committee on Environment, Natural Resources and Agriculture
- Joint Committee on Public Health
- Joint Committee on Public Service

== Electoral history ==
Sources: Massachusetts Secretary of the Commonwealth and The New York Times.

Massachusetts House of Representatives – Seventh Middlesex District, 2016
Party	Primary Candidate	Votes	%	±%
Democratic	Jack Patrick Lewis	824	36.9	
Democratic	Brett Walker	761	34.1	
Democratic	Philip Jack	642	28.7	

Party	General Election Candidate	Votes	%	±%
Democratic	Jack Patrick Lewis	9,222	61.8	
Republican	Yolanda Greaves	4,959	33.2	
None	Clifford Wilson	737	4.9	

== See also ==
- 2019–2020 Massachusetts legislature
- 2021–2022 Massachusetts legislature
