= Tom Sannicandro =

American politician

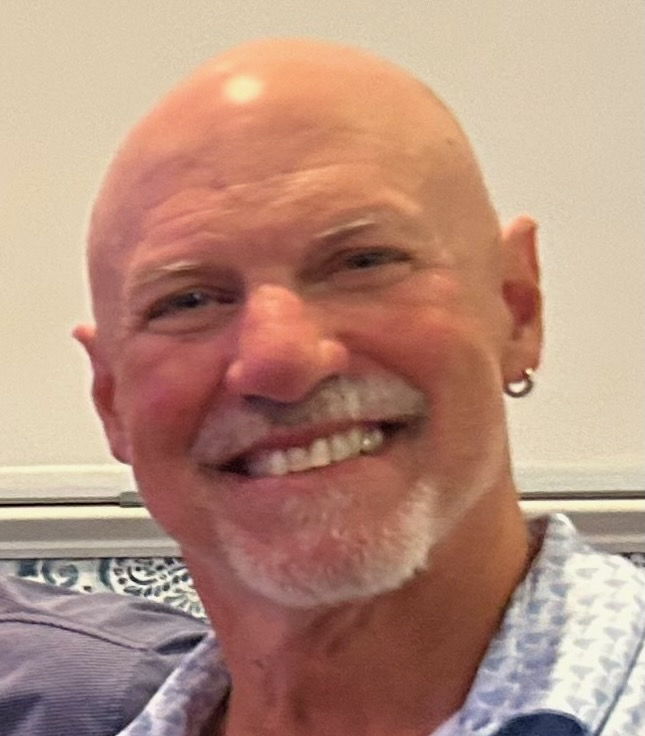
Tom Sannicandro

Tom Sannicandro (born March 22, 1956) is an entrepreneur, disability advocate, author, American politician, and attorney. He is the founder of SpecialNeedsTrustsOnline.com, a non-profit website providing information and estate planning documents to families with children with special needs. He is on the Board of Directors of the Inclusive Higher Education Accreditation Council, Inc., an independent accrediting agency for college and university programs that serve students with intellectual disabilities. He was the director of the Institute for Community Inclusion, a global disability research and policy center at UMass Boston from 2017 to 2019. From 2005 to 2017, he served in the Massachusetts House of Representatives, representing the 7th Middlesex district. Previously he served as director of the Massachusetts Association of Community Colleges.

== Education and early and academic career ==
Sannicandro earned a bachelor's degree from the College of the Holy Cross in 1978 and attended Suffolk University Law School, earning a J.D. in 1982. Upon completing law school, he worked as a corporate attorney, representing midsized manufacturing clients throughout New England. He later transitioned to representing individuals with disabilities. As an academic researcher, he published various articles exploring the effect of higher education on individuals with intellectual and developmental disabilities and health care trends for children with special health care needs.

He earned an MPA from Harvard University's John F. Kennedy School of Government in 2011. He also earned a master's and a Ph.D. in social policy from Brandeis University's Heller School for Social Policy and Management in 2015 and 2016, respectively. His doctoral dissertation was called The Effect of Postsecondary Education on Employment and Income for Individuals with Intellectual Disabilities.

== Political career ==
From 2000 until 2005, Sannicandro served on the Ashland School Committee, becoming committee chair by the end of his tenure. In 2004, Sannicandro ran for a seat in the House of Representatives' 7th Middlesex district after Representative Karen Spilka decided to run for a seat in the Massachusetts Senate. In the Democratic Primary Sannicandro won a write in campaign against Ginger Esty and Chesley Oriel. In the general election, he defeated Republican nominee Mary Connaughton, who would later be the Republican nominee for Massachusetts Auditor, unsuccessfully running against Suzanne Bump. He easily won reelection five more times, and was unopposed in 2008 and 2014. He did not seek reelection in 2016, and was succeeded by Jack Patrick Lewis.

During his tenure in the House of Representatives, Sannicandro supported legislation focusing on public higher education, and chaired the Joint Committee on Higher Education. During the Great Recession, he authored legislation using bond money to create a pool of $200 million to support public and private higher education institutions. This bill became part of the 2012 Economic Development Bill. In addition, Sannicandro sponsored a number of initiatives including the Inclusive Concurrent Enrollment Program, where students with intellectual or developmental disabilities attended Massachusetts public colleges and universities, and the Real Lives Bill, giving individuals served by the Department of Developmental Services control over their lives by controlling their budgets.

After leaving the House of Representatives, Sannicandro became director of the Institute of Community Inclusion at the University of Massachusetts Boston. He left that role in 2019 to become Director of the Massachusetts Association of Community Colleges, an advocacy organization on behalf of the fifteen public community colleges in Massachusetts, their Boards of Trustees, and the approximately 150,000 students enrolled in those community colleges.

== Other activities ==
Outside of his public-service and advocacy work, Tom Sannicandro is a bodybuilder and competed in masters-division weightlifting and physique events. His rigorous fitness practices, discipline in nutrition and recovery, and commitment to personal transformation are chronicled in his book Iron Legacy, in which he explores the parallels between building physical strength and forging leadership, resilience and community impact. Through this work, Sannicandro extends his message of inclusion and empowerment into the realm of personal health and wellness, inspiring others to apply the same principles of perseverance and purpose in all aspects of life.
