= Philip Travis =

American politician

Phil Travis
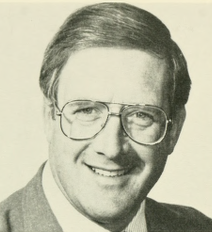
- Portrait of Philip Travis

Member of the Massachusetts House of Representatives from the 4th Bristol district
- In office 1983–2007
- Preceded by: Antone S. Aguiar Jr.
- Succeeded by: Steven D'Amico

Personal details
- Born: July 2, 1940 (age 86) Fall River, Massachusetts
- Party: Democratic
- Spouse: Susan Lapierre Travis (1963–2009; her death)
- Education: University of Massachusetts Dartmouth; Bryant College
- Occupation: Politician; College professor

Philip Travis (born July 2, 1940 in Fall River, Massachusetts) is an American politician who represented the 4th Bristol District in the Massachusetts House of Representatives from 1983–2007 and served as a member of the Board of Selectmen and School Committee in Rehoboth, Massachusetts. He also worked as a part-time professor at Massasoit Community College.

In 2004, Travis led the legislative effort to amend the state constitution to define marriage as a union between one man and one woman. The Massachusetts General Court deadlocked on the issue, which led to Goodridge v. Department of Public Health going into full effect.
