= Massachusetts Sales Tax Relief Act =

Question 3
- Massachusetts Sales Tax Relief Act

Results
Choice	Votes	%
Yes	966,973	43.20%
No	1,271,532	56.80%
Valid votes	2,238,505	100.00%
Invalid or blank votes	0	0.00%
Total votes	2,238,505	100.00%

No
90–100%
80–90%
70–80%
60–70%
50–60%
Yes
70–80%
60–70%
50–60%
Other
Tie
No votes

Massachusetts Question 3, filed under the name, the 3 percent Sales Tax Relief Act, appears on the November 2, 2010 ballot in the state of Massachusetts as an initiative. The measure, if enacted by voters, would reduce the state sales tax rate from 6.25 to 3 percent. The measure was sponsored by the Alliance to Roll Back Taxes headed by Carla Howell. The measure would be enacted into a law 30 days after the election if approved by voters.

== Text of measure ==
=== Ballot title ===
The ballot title of the measure reads:

Do you approve of a law summarized below, on which no vote was taken by the Senate or the House of Representatives before May 4, 2010?

=== Summary ===
The summary of the measure reads:

This proposed law would reduce the state sales and use tax rates (which were 6.25 percent as of September 2009) to 3 percent as of Jan. 1, 2011. It would make the same reduction in the rate used to determine the amount to be deposited with the state Commissioner of Revenue by non-resident building contractors as security for the payment of sales and use tax on tangible personal property used in carrying out their contracts.

The proposed law provides that if the 3 percent rates would not produce enough revenues to satisfy any lawful pledge of sales and use tax revenues in connection with any bond, note, or other contractual obligation, then the rates would instead be reduced to the lowest level allowed by law.

The proposed law would not affect the collection of moneys due the Commonwealth for sales, storage, use or other consumption of tangible personal property or services occurring before Jan. 1, 2011.

The proposed law states that if any of its parts were declared invalid, the other parts would stay in effect.

A YES VOTE would reduce the state sales and use tax rates to 3 percent.

A NO VOTE would make no change in the state sales and use tax rates.

== Fiscal impact ==
Proponents of the measure say rolling back the sales tax to 3% will stimulate $132 million in private sector investment; put an average of $688 back in the pockets of 3,400,000 taxpayers and create 33,000 new, private sector jobs. Political leaders in the state have claimed that there is no current backup plan if the measure is approved by voters.

== Support ==
=== Supporters ===
- The Alliance to Roll Back Taxes is the sponsor of the measure, which they also refer to as the Initiative to Roll Back the Sales Tax, and is headed by Carla Howell and Michael Cloud.
- Republican Gubernatorial Candidate Christy Mihos
- Massachusetts Package Store Association

=== Arguments ===
- The passage of the amendment would create as many as 32,929 jobs in the private sector.
- liquor stores have been negatively impacted by new alcohol and sales tax.
- vendors at the border between the state and New Hampshire are affected even more because New Hampshire does not have a sales tax
- Reducing the sales tax is a big step in ending the recession by giving families more income to spend.
- Voters made the decision last election not to support cutting the income tax and in return the sales tax was raised by 1.25% to 6.25%.

== Opposition ==
=== Opponents ===
- "No Special Tax Breaks for Alcohol" is the main opponent of the measure.
- Current Governor Deval Patrick.
- Representative Steven D'Amico.
- Senator Marc Pacheco
- Representative Fred Barrows
- The Massachusetts Taxpayers Foundation
- The Massachusetts Coalition for Our Communities, which was formed by the Massachusetts Teachers Association
- Newton Mayor Setti Warren

=== Arguments ===
Arguments that have been made against the measure include:

- we will be looking at major cuts to the budget.

=== Finance ===
State reports showing key campaign financers:

Contributor	Amount
National Education Association	$1,325,000.00
Massachusetts Teachers Association	$1,062,000.00
Service Employees International Union	$888,000.00
American Federation of Teachers - Massachusetts	$704,000.00
American Federation of State, County and Municipal Employees	$200,000.00
Boston Teachers Union	$150,000.00
Mass Nurses Association	$104,000.00

== Media endorsements ==
=== Support ===
- The Boston Herald, A major Boston news paper stated support for the initiative in an editorial published on October 7, 2010, writing "Sometimes a proposition is known by the enemies it makes - and lining up against the tax rollback are all the usual suspects. Unions - mostly public employee unions - have thus far built a $1.3 million kitty to pay for the coming onslaught of radio and TV ads." and "Taxpayers and voters are just fed up with lawmakers who listen more to special interests, more to public employee unions, more to advocates than to those paying the bills. Sometimes voters have to shout to be heard. This is one of those times"

=== Opposition ===
- The Republican, a western Massachusetts publication, stated opposition to the sales tax rollback in an editorial published on April 29, 2010, writing, "Someday these taxes should be lowered or eliminated, because they can hurt businesses and consumers. But someday is not today. The Legislature is dealing with a proposed $27.8 billion for fiscal 2011 that is at least $2 billion out of whack in an economy that is still sputtering."

== Path to the ballot ==
This is one of the fastest that tax drops Massachusetts has ever had from before 1900 the tax percentile has been 3 percent then over the course of 100 years it has raised to 6 percent then dropped back down. Activists stated during the week of November 19, 2009 that they had collected enough signatures to place the measure on the 2010 ballot. Carla Howell, chairwoman of the committee organizing the effort, Alliance to Roll Back Taxes, declined to provide the number of signatures collected, but did state: "We do feel confident we've submitted more than the requirement." The initiative was reviewed by the Massachusetts Legislature. Since the Massachusetts Legislature did not approve of the initiative by the May 4, 2010 deadline, petition organizers must have obtained signatures from about 1/2 of 1% of voters who voted in the last governor election and submit them before or on July 7, 2010. According to the Massachusetts Secretary of State's office, that number amounted to 11,099 signatures.

On June 23, 2010, initiative supporters turned in approximately 19,000 signatures, giving them a good chance of making the ballot in November. Carla Howell, the leader of the initiative campaign, stated that the measure will be placed on the ballot since that number of signatures was well over the 11,099 required.

On July 13, 2010, the Secretary of the Commonwealth affirmed that the sales tax roll back to 3% measure will be on the ballot as Question 3.
