= Community Choice Aggregation =

Alternative energy supply system

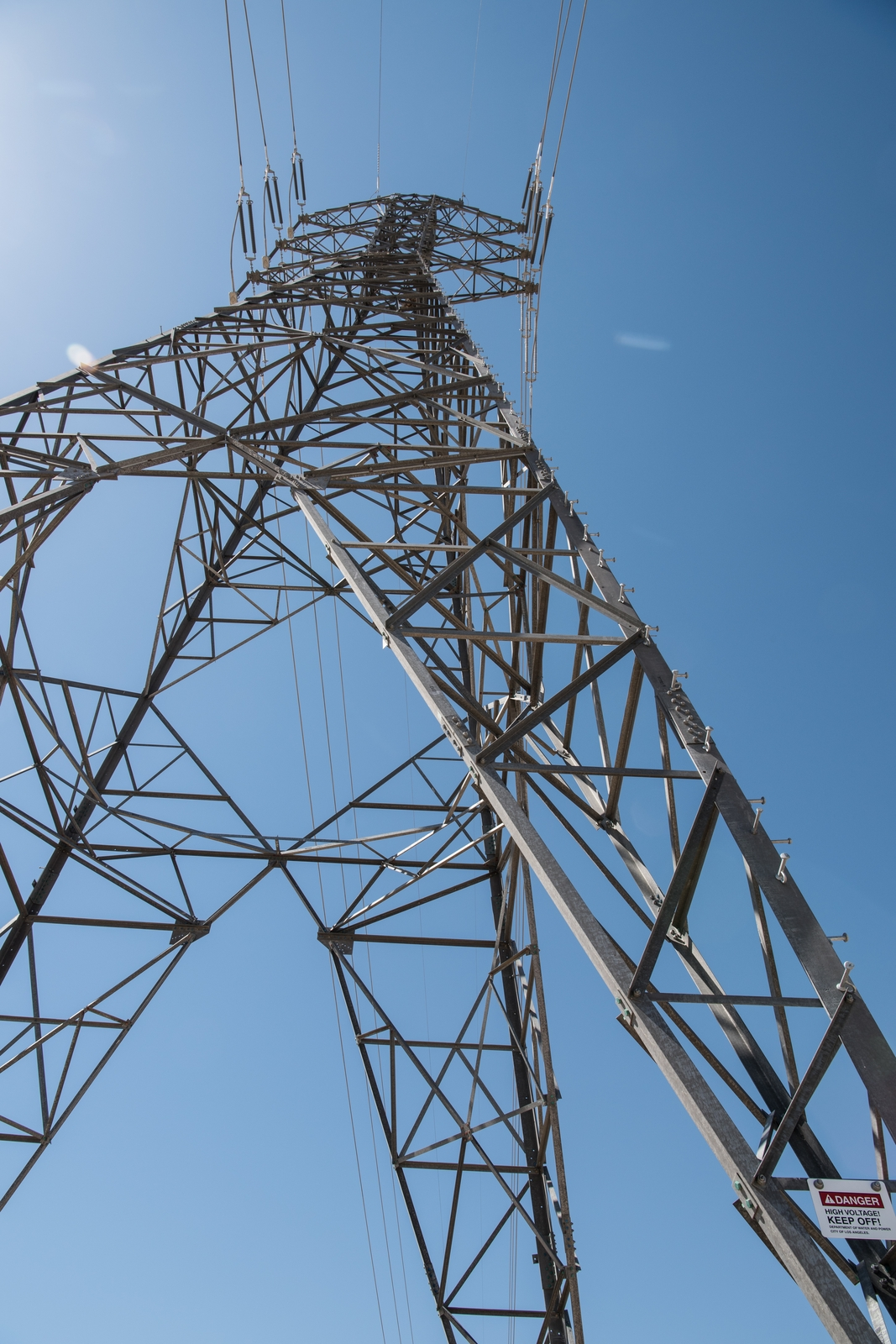
Power Transmission

Community Choice Aggregation (CCA), also known as Community Choice Energy, municipal aggregation, governmental aggregation, electricity aggregation, and community aggregation, is an alternative to the investor-owned utility energy supply system in which local entities in the United States aggregate the buying power of individual customers within a defined jurisdiction in order to secure alternative energy supply contracts. The CCA chooses the power generation source on behalf of the consumers.

By aggregating purchasing power, they are able to create large contracts with generators, something individual buyers may be unable to do. The main goals of CCAs have been to either lower costs for consumers or to allow consumers greater control of their energy mix, mainly by offering greener generation portfolios than local utilities. Eight states in the United States have enacted CCA enabling laws: Massachusetts, Ohio, California, Illinois, New Hampshire, New Jersey, New York, Rhode Island, and Virginia. Collectively, they serve about 15% of Americans in over 1850 municipalities as of 2024.

== How CCAs function in electricity distribution ==
Figure 1: How CCAs interact with utilities and consumers

CCAs are local, not-for-profit, public agencies that take on the decision-making role about sources of energy for electricity generation. Once established, CCAs become the default service provider for the power mix delivered to customers. In a CCA service territory, the incumbent utility continues to own and maintain the transmission and distribution infrastructure, metering, and billing. The municipality initiating the CCA sets up a governing board, usually made up of local elected officials, which makes key decisions about procurement, rates, and what local energy programs to fund.

== Renewable energy significance ==
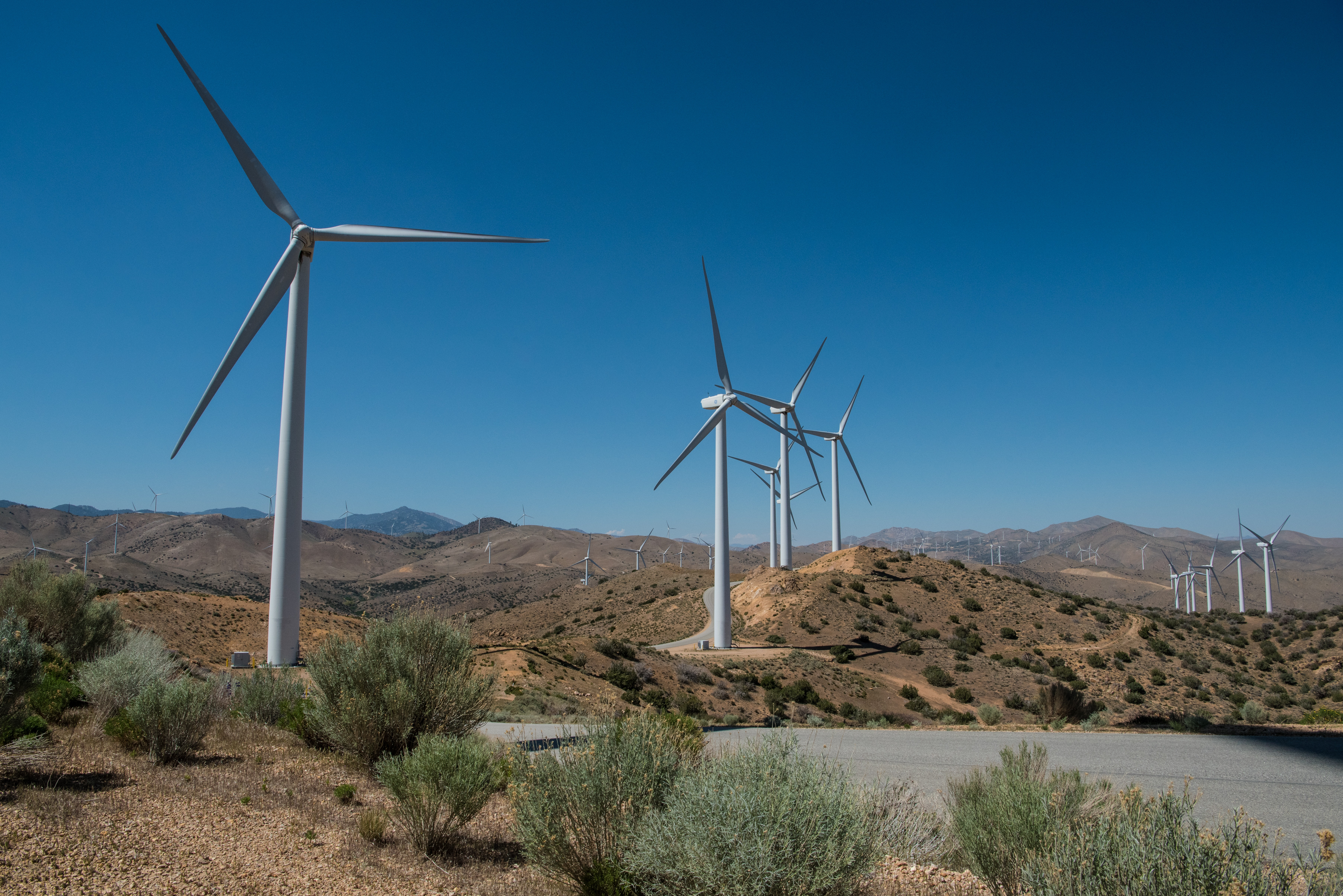
Wind power

Sonoma Clean Power, a CCA serving Sonoma and Mendocino counties in California, reported in 2019 that its standard service was 91% carbon-free. At that time it served about 224,000 accounts, or 87% of its eligible customers, and almost 2,000 customers had enrolled in its optional EverGreen service, which is supplied with 100% renewable energy from local solar and geothermal sources, including The Geysers. The agency stated that it had saved customers approximately $80 million in lower rates compared with PG&E. In 2017, it began construction on the first two of six planned solar projects near Petaluma.

Nationwide, only 13% of CCAs offer "green power," as their primary focus is to reduce electrical power costs to their customers. California CCAs lead in offering renewable electricity because they are so required by state law. However, CCAs in California voluntarily purchase renewable energy at levels that exceed renewables portfolio standard (RPS) mandates. Between 2011 and 2018, CCAs in California directly procured 24 terawatt-hours (TWh) of RPS-eligible electricity, of which 11 TWh is voluntary or in excess of RPS compliance, according to the UCLA Luskin Center for Innovation. Further, of the 72 cities and counties that are powered by 100% clean energy in the U.S., 64 are in California and are members of a CCA. In New York state, about 50% of the only active CCA sales are green. An additional 90 CCAs in Illinois, Mass. and Ohio provide renewable energy; but most CCAs do not offer voluntary renewable energy as a default energy product.

== Policy basis for CCAs ==
In the US, CCAs are permitted in nine states: Massachusetts, Ohio, California, Illinois, New Jersey, New York, Rhode Island, Virginia, and New Hampshire. States must first pass legislation allowing for the formation of CCAs before an agency can form. So far only deregulated states (see electric deregulation) have enacted CCA legislation. This is a natural progression as electricity deregulation separates the functions of electricity generation from transmission and distribution allowing consumers to choose their electricity generator. This separation then allows for CCAs to choose the electricity generation mix on behalf of consumers without having to establish the infrastructure to move electricity. However, only 17 states and the District of Columbia have deregulated markets. The remaining 33 states are considered regulated, where utilities retain a monopoly on generation, transmission, and distribution of electric power.

Legal Authorization for Community Choice Aggregation
State	Year	Authorizing Legislation	Authorizing Legislation Name
Massachusetts	1997	M.G.L. ch.93A §1	Utility Restructuring Act of 1997
Ohio	2001	Local Ballot Measure	N/A
California	2002	Assembly Bill 117	Electrical Restructuring: Aggregation
Illinois	2002 (residential)	220 ILCS 5/Art. XVI	Electric Service Customer Choice and Rate Relief Law of 1997
New Jersey	2003	Assembly Bill 2165	Government Energy Aggregation Act of 2003
New York	2016	PSC Case 14-M-0224	Order Authorizing Framework for Community Choice Aggregation Opt-Out Program
Rhode Island	1996	RIPUC No. 8124	Utility Restructuring Act of 1996
New Hampshire	2019	NH RSA 53-E	Aggregation of Electric Customers By Municipalities and Counties

== Early days ==
In Massachusetts, where the nation's first CCA bill (Senate 447, Montigny) was first drafted by Massachusetts senate energy committee director Paul Douglas Fenn in 1995 and enacted in 1997, the locales of Cape Cod and Martha's Vineyard formed the Cape Light Compact and successfully lobbied for passage of the seminal CCA legislation. Two of the Cape Light Compact founders, Falmouth Selectman Matthew Patrick and Barnstable County Commissioner Rob O'Leary, were subsequently elected to the Massachusetts House of Representatives and Senate respectively. Between 1995 and 2000, Fenn formed the American Local Power Project and worked with Patrick to draft and pass similar laws in Ohio, New Jersey, and other states.

== Massachusetts ==
The nation's first CCA, the Cape Light Compact, currently serves 200,000 customers, running aggressive and transparent energy efficiency programs and installing solar installations on Cape Cod schools, fire stations and libraries.

As of March 2019, about 150 Massachusetts cities and towns have adopted community choice aggregation, including Boston and Worcester.

== Ohio ==
In Ohio, the nation's largest CCA was formed in 2000 when the state legislature adopted a CCA law that formed the Northeast Ohio Public Energy Council (NOPEC), made up of approximately 500,000 customers in 112 cities and towns across 8 counties, procured a power supply contract that switched electric generation fuel supply from a mix of coal and nuclear power to a mix of natural gas and a small percentage of renewably powered electricity, and announced a 70% air pollution reduction in the region's power mix. Unlike California CCAs, NOPEC offers both electric power(510,000 customers) and natural gas (400,000 customers). The council has grown to 228 communities in 14 counties.

In 2020, Ohio's capital Columbus approved a city-wide ballot measure, giving it an electricity aggregation plan which will supply it with 100% renewable energy by the start of 2023. Its vendor, AEP Energy, plans to construct new wind and solar farms in Ohio to help supply the electricity.

== California ==
=== Overview ===
In 2002, California State Legislature enacted Assembly Bill 117, setting the foundation for Community Choice Aggregation in California. The bill recognized that as local, not-for-profit service providers, overseen by their local elected officials, CCAs are the preferred default service provider in their service territory. So CCA law mandated that customers be automatically enrolled in their local CCA, with the ability to opt out at any time to remain a "bundled customer" with their incumbent utility. The law also makes the clarification that, in California, CCAs are by legal definition not utilities, and are legally defined in California law as not-for-profit electric service providers.[2]

After passage of AB 117, two years of rulemaking followed at the California Public Utilities Commission. The fundamentals of CCA regulation are contained in this rule-making that occurred between 2003 and 2005:

- Phase 1 Decision: December 2004: Implementing Portions of AB 117 Concerning Community Choice Aggregation
- Phase 2 Decision: December 15, 2005: Decision Resolving Phase 2 Issues on Implementation of Community Choice Aggregation

Upon completion of this rulemaking process, CCA became available to local governments in late 2005.

In the early days of the California energy crisis, Paul Fenn, the Massachusetts Senate Energy Committee director who conducted the legal research and drafting of the original CCA legislation, formed Local Power Inc. and drafted new CCA legislation for California. In a campaign organized by Local Power, the City and County of San Francisco led Oakland, Berkeley, Marin County, and a group of Los Angeles municipalities in adopting resolutions asking for a state CCA law in response to the failure of California's deregulated electricity market. Fenn's bill was sponsored by then Assembly Member Carole Migden (D-San Francisco) in 2001, and the bill became law (AB117) in September 2002.

CCA formation in California was delayed by initial political opposition by the state's investor-owned utilities. In June 2010, Pacific Gas & Electric sponsored a ballot initiative, Proposition 16, to make it more difficult for local entities to form either municipal utilities or CCAs by requiring a two-thirds vote of the electorate rather than a simple majority, for a public agency to enter the retail power business. Although PG&E spent over $46 million in an effort to pass the initiative Prop 16's opponents, a broad coalition led by grassroots clean energy activists, Local Power Inc., and The Utility Reform Network, raised and spent less than $100,000, Proposition 16 was defeated.

San Francisco adopted a CCA Ordinance drafted by Fenn (86–04, Tom Ammiano) in 2004, creating a CCA program to build 360 Megawatts (MW) of solar, green distributed generation, wind generation, and energy efficiency and demand response to serve San Francisco ratepayers using solar bonds. Specifically, the ordinance combined the power purchasing authority of CCA with a revenue bond authority also developed by Fenn to expand the power of CCA, known as the H Bond Authority (San Francisco Charter Section 9.107.8, Ammiano), to allow the CCA to finance new green power infrastructure, worth approximately $1 Billion. In 2007 the City adopted a detailed CCA Plan also written primarily by Fenn (Ordinance 447–07, Ammiano and Mirkarimi), which established a 51% Renewable Portfolio Standard by 2017 for San Francisco. Over the following decade, Sonoma and San Francisco worked with Fenn's company, Local Power Inc. on program designs focused on achieving energy localization through renewables and energy efficiency.

Inspired by Climate Protection efforts, CCA has spread to cities throughout the Bay Area and the state. In 2007, 40 California local governments were in the process of exploring CCA, virtually all of them seeking to double, triple or quadruple the green power levels (Renewable Portfolio Standard, or "RPS) of the state's three Investor-Owned Utilities. As of November 2020, there are 23 CCAs serving the energy needs of more than 10 million customers in more than 180 cities and counties throughout California, and more are expected to have CCA service in 2020–2021 as new programs launch and existing programs expand.

In April, 2014, Assemblymember Steve Bradford (D-Gardena) introduced legislation (AB 2145) that would sharply limit the ability of CCAs to enroll customers. CCA advocates and a broad coalition of local governments, business, and environmental organization rose up in opposition and defeated AB 2145. AB 2145 passed in the California Assembly but died in the Senate on August 30, 2014, when the Senate's legislative session was ended without it coming up for a vote.

=== New renewable development ===
The California Renewables Portfolio Standard (RPS) is a standard established by the State of California that requires electricity service providers in the State to include certain minimum levels of defined renewable energy in their power mixes. In California all CCAs meet or exceed these minimum standards.

CCAs are regulated by their local governing boards, which are mostly made up of local government elected officials. In addition, CCAs must comply with State and federal regulations that apply to them. They engage with numerous state and federal agencies, including their regulatory overseer, the California Public Utilities Commission, and also the California Air Resources Board, California Energy Commission, and the Federal Energy Regulatory Commission.

CCAs are well established in California with the first one having launched service in 2010. As of January 2020 there were 21 operational CCAs in California serving over 10 million customers. CCAs are responsible for over 3,000 megawatts of new renewable energy in California, including solar, wind, and bioenergy. They are the primary procurers of California renewable energy portfolio-eligible renewable energy in the State.

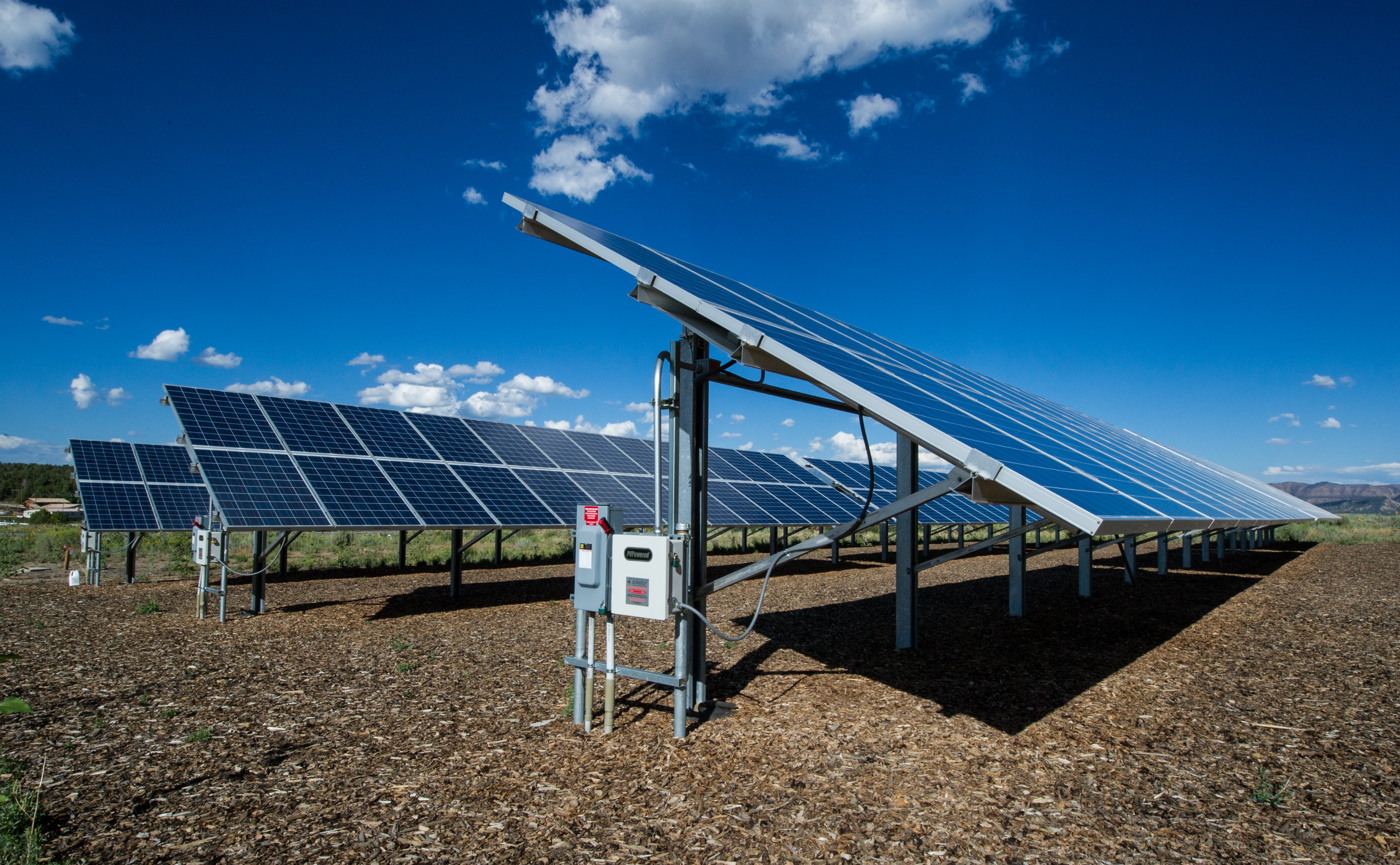
Solar panels

All CCAs in California are entering into contracts for new renewables. In 2018, six of 19 California CCAs had Power Purchase Agreements for new renewables, accounting for approximately 10% of CCAs total load and 1.6% of California's total load assuming an average 30% capacity factor for all types of renewable technologies.

=== Power Charge Indifference Adjustment ===
Other issues that can arise from the development of community choice aggregation include the development of exit fees, specifically in the state of California. This is an issue for CCAs in the state of California because it allows Investor-owned utility (IOU) to raise prices through a Power Charge Indifference Adjustment (PCIA) or exit fee, making it more expensive for customers to join CCA programs because there will be a fee to customers when they choose to stop using bundled services provided by their utility provider and start using a CCA program.

The exit fee, which typically is charged for 5 years, is applied to each kilowatt-hour of electricity consumed by the customer and shows up as a separate charge CCA customers' monthly bills. In California, it has been difficult to determine the appropriate exit fee to customers who remain at the incumbent utility are not paying more than their fair share for these long term services, which has caused exit fees to change rapidly. Exit fees in Pacific Gas & Electric's service area decreased by 62 percent from 2012 to 2013, only to spike by 211 percent from 2013 to 2016 and increase again in a 2018 CPUC order. The main issues revolving PCIA is the transparency of the program, accountability of the agencies, and proper valuation of costs associated with the exit fees. Exit fees are put on CCA users to compensate for the cost that would be put on those remaining with IOU services.

The PCIA has tended to be very volatile and uncertain due to policy and regulatory debates on what level of exit fees is "fair" for both IOU and CCA customers. For instance, the PCIA for PG&E decreased by 62% from 2012 to 2013 and increased by 211% from 2013 to 2016.

Costs such as the exit fees and increased rates can be a disadvantage as CCAs can raise prices for customers. Rate setters and local officials can set CCA prices which can be a disadvantage if local government acts on their own self-interest or if local government lacks the knowledge to make decisions about CCA and prices in their localities.

In October 2018, after working on this issue for a year, the regulators at the CPUC announced their decision to continue and increase the cost of PCIAs to insure that IOU customers are not left with excessive energy costs due to the defection of customers to CCAs. The rate impact those leaving for CCAs was expected to be a 1.68% increase to those customers leaving PG&E; 2.5% increase on Southern California Edison defectors and 5.25% on customers departing SDG&E.

The choice to opt out can be a benefit for customer choice but it can also be a risk for CCA programs because if there are many customers choosing to opt out of the services, this can result in financial instability among the CCA.

=== Procuring power and the role of energy marketers ===
Some Community Choice Aggregators hire third-party consultants with experience in energy markets to procure and schedule power. This may be especially necessary with newer CCAs who are still staffing up and lack credit ratings; as such they are not able to finance the building of their own generation assets. CCAs are continuing to earn investment-grade credit ratings from the likes of Fitch, Moody's, and S&P; Central Coast Community Energy, CleanPowerSF, MCE, Peninsula Clean Energy, and Silicon Valley Clean Energy all have investment-grade credit ratings, and other CCAs are pursuing them.

One of the advantages a CCA can offer is its focus on local jobs creation and support of local energy resources. But, because of the mandate to provide power at a low cost, CCAs in California have by necessity contracted with multinational and fossil-fuel reliant corporations such as Shell, Calpine Energy Direct Energy and Constellation (a subsidiary of Exelon).

=== Energy resource stability and Provider of Last Resort ===
As of 2017, CCAs in California have some resource adequacy requirements, but the incumbent utility remains the Provider of Last Resort (POLR). As CCAs proliferate in California, there is debate and concern over who takes on the POLR responsibility if a CCA fails. Some investor-owned utilities have indicated a desire to stop purchasing and selling electricity, and if incumbent utilities are no longer in the business of providing power, it may no longer be feasible for them to provide this backstop. Individual CCAs differ on whether they want to or are capable of taking on this responsibility.

The CPUC has released a study called the "Green Book," which is reminiscent of the agency's "Blue" and "Yellow" Books in 1993, which led to California's deregulation and subsequent energy crisis in the early 2000s. The substance of the "Green Book" is to call for thoughtful and comprehensive energy planning to help the state both meet its renewable source energy goals and avoid the turmoil of deregulated and fragmented energy supplies and suppliers.

There are crucial trends, pointed out the CPUC, that threaten California's three pillars of energy policy: reliability, affordability and deep decarbonization. The first trend revolves on fragmented decision making. Nine CCAs provided energy to consumers in 2017; there are 21 today. By the mid-2020s, 85% of power in California could be provided by new entities, different from those providing power in 2019.

Trend two is poorly planned and organized procurement of the resources needed to ensure reliability. The third trend is ignoring the potential that customers might lose power service if their electric provider fails, as did some in the crisis of the early 2000s. Critics responded that grim predictions and unclear recommendations in the Green Book are not substantiated.

=== Risks involved in power system fragmentation ===
System fragmentation puts the state closer to a reliability risk of not meeting its clean energy targets: California has 40 load serving entities, which include 19 CCAs. The rise of CCAs has fractured the role of California's three big regulated utilities as the primary providers of the state's grid reliability needs, and CCAs are not doing the type of resource adequacy planning needed to keep the system stable as it decarbonizes.

As the state's energy system becomes increasingly fragmented, regulators and policy makers are expressing concerns about resource adequacy to keep the system reliable and whether the state will meet its goal to have 100% clean energy by 2045.

A recent report from a California administrative law judge analyzing Integrated Resources Plans done by all load serving entities noted that: "Because the majority of new resources in California are expected to be acquired by CCAs in the next decade, this puts additional focus on their contributions to the IRP process. Very concerning overall is the attitude displayed by some CCAs with respect to the IRP process in general. Several CCAs asserted the primacy of their voluntary plans approved by their local governing boards over the Commission's IRP process, and argued that the Commission's IRP processes do not fit with their individual resource procurement plans. This demonstrates the crux of the problem the State will face in coming years as more and more load is served by non-IOU, and specifically CCA, providers."

The issue has become so pressing that the California Legislature is considering a bill (AB 56, in committee in September 2019) to give the CPUC the ability to task an existing state agency to serve as a backstop for procurement of electricity to meet the state's climate, clean energy, and reliability goals.

=== Customer choice in California ===
California CCAs typically offer customers several energy programs to choose from - a default program, which is usually an energy mix similar to that provided by the incumbent utility, a program based on solar energy and a more expensive, 100% renewable program. This renewable program is backed by unbundled Renewable Energy Credits (the customers cannot link the power they are buying to a specific renewable resource). In 2018, these programs ranged from 37% to 100% renewable, with a statewide average of 52 percent. CCAs may also offer solar rebates and net metering, and some provide electric vehicle rebates for income-qualifying customers.

Some of the offerings by CCAs may meet the standards set by Green- E. For example, Marin Clean Energy offers a "Light Green," a "Deep Green," and "Local Sol Program" where only the Deep Green and Local Sol options are Green- E certified. Green-e certified are programs that are regulated and determined to meet a specific criteria and standards established by Green- E, developed by the nonprofit organization Center for Resource Solutions.

=== CCA rates and consumer protection ===
Whether a CCA offers lower or higher rates than its incumbent utility is based on the size of the PCIA (exit fee), whether the incumbent utility changes its rates, and the specific "Renewable Energy" package the customer wants. CCA websites usually compare the CCA's rates to that the incumbent utility. For example, Clean Power Alliance 2019 rates are 1-2% cheaper (for the 36% clean power) than Southern California Edison and 7-9% higher (if customers choose the 100% clean power, which uses unbundled Renewable Energy Credits).

The CPUC cannot adjudicate customer complaints between CCAs and customers because they do not have oversight over the CCA on consumer protection issues. This responsibility falls with the CCA Board of Directors. In addition, given that CCAs are not regulated through the CPUC like IOUs, there is no visibility regarding cost allocations amongst different customer classes.

Marin Clean Energy offers 10 different rate packages. When comparing its E-1 package with that of PG&E, the MCE Light Green (50% renewable) rate is .047% (six cents) cheaper than the PG&E rate. If the customer chooses the MCE Deep Green (100% renewable) package, the PG&E Solarchoice (100% renewable) package is 1.2% ($1.63) less than the MCE rate. The nine other MCE packages compare closely.

=== Employment and union relations ===
In California, CCA customers remain customers of the investor-owned utilities (IOUs). That's because CCA customers continue to receive a range of services from the incumbent utilities. As Pacific Gas & Electric notes: "It's important to remember that if a customer becomes a CCA customer, they are still a PG&E customer. We continue to deliver the electricity to CCA customers through our transmission and distribution system, and provide meter reading, billing, customer service and maintenance services."

The vast majority of IOU employees provide transmission and distribution system maintenance and upgrades for electricity lines, billing and customer service—all of which the IOUs continue to provide. New jobs have been created constructing and operating clean energy generation facilities for energy suppliers of CCAs, and providing call center and other services for CCAs.

CCAs in California support union jobs and wages by signing power purchase agreements with new energy facilities that are built with union labor. CCAs have signed contracts with new renewable energy facilities totaling more than 3,600 megawatts. Some of the unions/trades participating in construction of new renewable projects include: Carpenters (Local 152), IBEW (Local 11), IBEW (Local 47), IBEW (Local 100), IBEW (Local 125), IBEW (Local 184), IBEW (Local 302), IBEW (Local 551), IBEW (Local 595), IBEW (Local 684), IBEW (Local 1245), Ironworkers (Local 155), Ironworkers (Local 416), Ironworkers (Local 433), Iron Workers (Local 378), Laborers (Local 294), Laborers (Local 300), Laborers (Local 324), Laborers (Local 1130), Millwrights (Local 102), Operating Engineers (Local 3), Operating Engineers (Local 12), Plumbers and Pipefitters (Local 228), Teamsters.

CCA call centers throughout the state are also staffed by union workers. For example, call center representatives at Energy Choice California elected to join IBEW 1245 in May 2018. ECC is a woman-owned business which handles call center work for Calpine Energy Solutions. Calpine provides data management and customer contact services for 17 of 21 CCAs in California.

Labor unions have criticized CCAs for not supporting and instigating local job growth, reducing union jobs, and contracting with power providers who use non-union labor. CCAs tend to employ fewer employees than IOUs and contracts with large multinational corporations are primarily fulfilled through the use of non-union labor. For example, The Western Labor and Management Public Affairs Committee (Western LAMPC) has raised concerns about CCAs in California and their relationships with union labor. The committee censured MCE for its contracts with large, multi-national energy providers like Shell, stating that MCE purchases most of its energy from out-of-state non-union corporations. It also reprimanded Sonoma Clean Power for its contracts with Constellation Power and Sonoma's unwillingness to provide firm commitments to local projects.

San Diego's two locals of the International Brotherhood of Electrical Workers (IBEW) have expressed concern over the possible loss of union jobs as San Diego forms its own, new CCA. The union wants union-scale wages, involvement in any construction projects and an opportunity to unionize workers in the new CCA. Electrical union workers in the Los Angeles area have approved the CCA concept, as long as union jobs remain available.

=== California CCAs ===
==== Marin Clean Energy ====
Marin County launched California's first CCA program, MCE, on May 7, 2010, offering 60%-100% renewable energy at competitive and stable rate significantly reducing energy-related greenhouse gas emissions and enabling millions of dollars of reinvestment in local energy programs. MCE is a load-serving entity supporting a 1,000 MW peak load. The CCA provides electricity service to more than 480,000 customer accounts and more than one million residents and businesses in 34 member communities across four Bay Area counties: Contra Costa, Napa, Marin and Solano.

==== Sonoma Clean Power ====
The Sonoma County-based Center for Climate Protection formally introduced the idea of pursuing CCA in Sonoma County in the 2008 Community Climate Action Plan. In 2011, the Sonoma County Water Agency funded the production of a feasibility study to study the question. The feasibility study was favorable and after much public review and the formation of a Joint Powers Authority to administer the agency, Sonoma Clean Power launched service on May 1, 2014 offering power that is both greener and more locally sourced, at a lower cost than incumbent utility PG&E. The county and all eight eligible cities in the county eventually joined. This includes Cloverdale, Cotati, Petaluma, Rohnert Park, Santa Rosa, Sebastopol, Sonoma, and Windsor.

In 2016 Mendocino County voted to join Sonoma Clean Power and the Sonoma Clean Power governing board voted to accept Mendocino County and the cities of Fort Bragg, Willits, and Point Arena into the Joint Powers Authority.

==== Lancaster Choice Energy ====
Lancaster Choice Energy (LCE) began providing renewable power to municipal accounts in May 2015 with broad public enrollment beginning in October. So far the city of Lancaster, California has offset almost 70% of its peak load (147 megawatts) with renewable sources of energy. Lancaster aims to become the first net-zero city in the U.S., Lancaster is determined to generate more clean energy than it consumes, along with several private-sector partners. The city has established new rules for building more efficient, sustainable structures. As of the end of its first full year of operations in 2016 Lancaster Choice Energy had 55,000 accounts in the City of Lancaster. LCE customers receive a minimum of 36% renewable energy through the standard Clear Choice product, with many opting up to 100% renewable Smart Choice. In addition, LCE's first solar energy plant is now live. Built by sPower, the plant provides 10 MW of power produced in Lancaster directly for Lancaster residents and is enough to power approximately 1,800 homes.

==== CleanPowerSF ====
Launched May 2016, City and County of San Francisco.

==== Peninsula Clean Energy ====
Peninsula Clean Energy (PCE) was formed in February 2016 by unanimous votes of the County of San Mateo and all 20 incorporated cities and towns in the county. It began supplying power to customers in the Fall of 2016 and is currently the largest community choice energy program in California. As of June 2017 it was offering its customers a baseline product that is both cleaner (at least 50% renewable and 75% greenhouse gas free) and at a lower cost than the incumbent utility, PG&E. As of June 2017 it was also offering its customers a 100% renewable product that was significantly less expensive than PG&E's 100% renewable product.

==== Silicon Valley Clean Energy ====
Silicon Valley Clean Energy (SVCE) launched its operation on April 3, 2017, by providing 100% GHG free electricity to 12 Silicon Valley communities, including Campbell, Cupertino, Gilroy, Los Altos, Los Altos Hills, Los Gatos, Monte Sereno, Morgan Hill, Mountain View, Saratoga, Sunnyvale and unincorporated County of Santa Clara.

==== Ava Community Energy (formerly East Bay Community Energy) ====
Ava Community Energy, or Ava, (formerly East Bay Community Energy, also abbreviated EBCE), avaenergy.org, was formed in October 2016 by Alameda County and the cities of Albany, Berkeley, Dublin, Emeryville, Fremont, Hayward, Livermore, Oakland, Piedmont, San Leandro, and Union City. Ava Community Energy (Ava) began providing electricity in June 2018 for commercial and municipal customers and November 2018 for residential customers. In 2021, Ava began serving electricity to the cities of Newark, Pleasanton, and Tracy.

In 2022, the City of Stockton voted to join Ava, and in 2023, the City of Lathrop voted to join. Ava will begin serving electricity to these two cities in 2025.

Ava offers customers two energy services. Their Bright Choice service uses a slightly larger amount of clean energy sources as Pacific Gas and Electric Company (PG&E) but it costs less. The second service option is their Renewable 100 option which uses 100% California wind and solar energy and is offered at a cost just above the PG&E rate.

==== Central Coast Community Energy (formerly Monterey Bay Community Power) ====
Central Coast Community Energy (3CE) procures carbon-free and renewable electricity for over 400,000 customers in 33 communities in Monterey, San Benito, Santa Cruz, San Luis Obispo, and Santa Barbara Counties. 3Ce began serving commercial customers in March 2018, with residential service beginning July 2018. 3CE reinvests in the communities it serves by discounting its electric generation rates and providing energy program incentives.3CE is geographically the largest CCA.

==== San Jose Clean Energy ====
On May 16, 2017, San Jose City Council approved the creation of San Jose Clean Energy, making San Jose the largest city in California to adopt a CCA.

==== Clean Power Alliance ====
Formed in 2017, a new CCA opened in February 2019 in Los Angeles and Ventura counties in Southern California. The Clean Power Alliance will provide electrical energy to residents of 29 cities and unincorporated parts of the counties. Cities like Los Angeles, Burbank, and Glendale who have municipal utilities, will remain with their local energy source.

Clean Power Alliance provides three rate plans to its customers, all varying in renewable sources of energy. Plan one offers 36% renewable at a cost 1% cheaper than Southern California Edison (SCE). The second plan has 50% renewable energy and is the same cost as SCE; the third provides 100% renewable power at a cost 9% higher than SCE. All the rates are set by the CPA board, whose 31 directors represent each city and county served.

==== San Diego Community Power ====
In 2019, the city council of San Diego voted to develop a CCA that would provide electric power to San Diego, as well as Chula Vista, La Mesa, Encinitas and Imperial Beach CA. The city hopes that the CCA, which will be the second largest in the state after Los Angeles' Clean Power Alliance, will be operational by 2021. The San Diego CCA expects to offer its customers rates about 5% lower than those of IOU San Diego Gas and Electric. Program supporters say the CCA will provide green sources of power at rates lower or equal to those of SDG&E. This is critical as San Diego's climate plan calls for 100% renewable energy by 2035; more ambitious than the state of California's by ten years. A 150 MW solar farm with 4 hours of battery is scheduled for 2023.

Critics of the CCA say cities have little or no experience in purchasing or generating electricity and the unpredictable nature of the energy industry can lead to volatility and chaotic conditions. Unions find the plan "labor weak;" the Sierra Club commented that the CCA should insure that nuclear and fossil fuel energy be completely excluded from the CCA's energy procurement.

==== California Community Choice Association ====
In 2016, six Community Choice agencies - CleanPowerSF, Lancaster Choice Energy, MCE, Peninsula Clean Energy, Silicon Valley Clean Energy, and Sonoma Clean Power - formed a non-profit trade association, the California Community Choice Association, also known as CalCCA. CalCCA held its first meeting in San Francisco in October 2016.

==== Emerging CCAs in California ====
Multiple cities across the state of California are considering the implementation of Community Choice aggregation programs across their districts. California has many communities who are anticipated to launch CCAs, this includes San Diego and Butte County. There are also other cities and counties who are exploring and in the process of implementing CCA, this includes Fresno County, and San Luis Obispo County.

== Illinois ==
The state of Illinois adopted a CCA law in 2009, which has led to an increase of communities providing electricity services to over 2/3 of the state's population as of 2014, including the city of Chicago, whose former mayor Rahm Emanuel focused the program on reducing coal power production and increasing renewable energy.

As of October 2013, 671 Illinois cities and towns (representing 80% of the state's residential electricity market) have utilized CCA.

By the end of 2013, 91 local governments in Illinois (representing 1.7 million state residents) used the state's 2009 CCA law to purchase 100% renewable electricity for their communities.

Savings through the Illinois CCAs were at their best in 2013, when customers saved over $250 million, but fixed-price contracts with providers expired and rates leveled. In summer 2016 114 communities dropped or suspended their CCA programs. The biggest change was in Chicago where the initial sign-up for the program was 750,000 homes – almost two million people. In 2015, most returned to their original utility power supplier.

When Illinois' CCAs began, cost savings were guaranteed by law, with aggregators saving 30% below fixed utility prices during a transitional period when utility default rates were frozen to allow retail marketers to get started. Total CCA savings peaked in 2013, with CCA customers saving $258 million compared to ComEd's default rate. However, once ComEd's fixed price contracts started to expire and rates fell closer to market prices, short-term contracts set prices like those of competitive energy suppliers. As a result, many of Illinois' CCAs were not saving money, resulting in CCA customers spending $188 million more than the incumbent utility's default rate over a two-year timeframe.

== New Hampshire ==
New Hampshire revised its authorizing legislation in 2019, and the NH PUC adopted regulations in late 2022. In 2023, the Community Power Coalition of New Hampshire was launched with a dozen communities. By the end of 2024, fifty-two communities were enrolled, and 20 more were preparing to launch.

== New Jersey ==
New Jersey adopted a CCA law in 2003, but did not see active formation of aggregations until 2013, when Bergen County, Passaic County, and fifteen other cities and counties started CCA programs, focused on both lowering electric bills and in some cases greening their power supply, or both.

== New York ==
The New York State Public Service Commission (PSC) has identified CCA as consistent with the stated goals of the regulatory reform "Reforming the Energy Vision" (REV), and has stated that local energy planning helps municipalities benefit from distributed energy resources enabled by REV. CCA legislation had been filed in the New York State Assembly in February 2014, followed by Governor Andrew Cuomo's order directing the PSC to implement CCA directly under its own authority in December 2014.

In December 2014, non-profit organization Sustainable Westchester submitted a petition to the PSC on behalf of its member municipalities to implement a CCA demonstration program in Westchester County. The PSC granted the Order on February 26, 2015, authorizing Sustainable Westchester to put out an RFP and award contracts for both electric and natural gas supply for residents and small businesses within municipalities in the county that pass a resolution to join the CCA: "The Sustainable Westchester pilot is expected to provide valuable experience on CCA design and outcomes that, in addition to the many comments in that proceeding, will assist the Commission in making a determination on statewide implementation of CCA."

The program launched in 2015, becoming the first operational CCA in New York State. Similar local CCA organizing efforts are underway in Ulster County, Sullivan County, Hudson Highlands, and other communities.

== Rhode Island ==
The Utility Restructuring Act of 1996 deregulated the utility market within Rhode Island, allowing consumers to choose their electricity generation supplier and CCAs to form. While this act allowed for the creation of CCAs, there are currently no residential or small business CCAs available for private consumers to join. The only CCA option is for municipal facilities.

Rhode Island Energy Aggregation Program (REAP)

The Reap program "is operated by the Rhode Island League of Cities & Towns and serves 36 of Rhode Island's 39 municipalities and four school districts". The Reap program facilitated the purchase of electricity by the municipal entity by submitting requests for proposals, reviewing bids from approved electricity generators, and selecting companies that they believe will be the ideal provider for each municipality. The program reported in 2012 it had achieved cost savings of 20-30% over the standard offer.

== Advantages and disadvantages ==
There are advantages and disadvantages associated with the implementation of Community Choice Aggregation across different localities. CCA provides benefits like providing a customer choice, reduced energy costs, renewable energy, and environmental benefits.

By providing customer choice, customers have the ability to be enrolled in CCA or maintain their current utility provider. Customers are automatically enrolled in the program but they can choose to opt out of it. CCAs reduce energy costs, lowering rates for customers. This also increases the use of affordable renewable energy, provided through wind, solar, and geothermal steam. This provides environmental benefits for communities because it reduces natural gas consumption and greenhouse gas emissions.

There are also disadvantages associated with the implementation of CCAs. Potential issues associated with the implementation include political and financial obstacles. CCAs can encounter groups lobbying against its implementation, setbacks from IOUs, exit fees, and even disadvantages associated with the opt-out choices.

On the political level, local government can be opposed by groups and organizations. An example of this is when the IOU Pacific Gas and Electric Company opposed the creation of CCA by supporting California Proposition 16 in 2010, which would have made it difficult for California to implement CCAs across the state. Another utility provider who took action was San Diego Gas & Electric who attempted to stop local government from implementing CCA programs. SDG&E created a separate entity, that would allow them to lobby against CCAs in San Diego County.
