= Massachusetts House of Representatives' 7th Middlesex district =

American legislative district

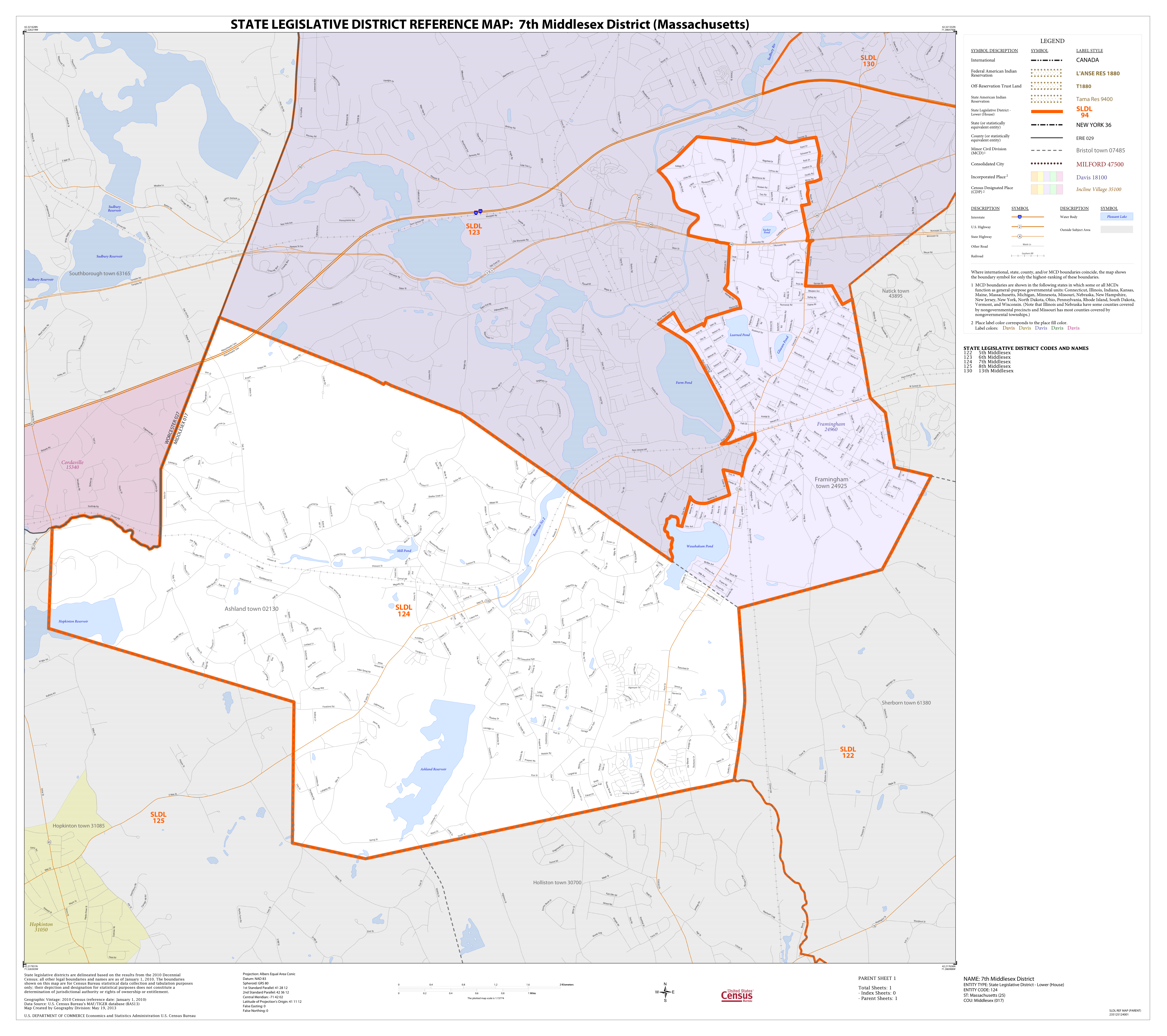
Map of Massachusetts House of Representatives' 7th Middlesex district, based on the 2010 United States census.

Massachusetts House of Representatives' 7th Middlesex district in the United States is one of 160 legislative districts included in the lower house of the Massachusetts General Court. It covers part of Middlesex County. Democrat Jack Patrick Lewis of Framingham has represented the district since 2017.

== Locales represented ==
The district includes the following localities:

- Ashland
- part of Framingham

The current district geographic boundary overlaps with that of the Massachusetts Senate's 2nd Middlesex and Norfolk district.

=== Former locale ===
The district previously covered part of Cambridge, circa 1872.

== Representatives ==
- Nathan K. Noble, circa 1858-1859
- Wm. Page, circa 1858
- Wm. A. Saunders, circa 1858
- Alanson Bigelow, circa 1859
- William T. Richardson, circa 1859
- Irving L. Russell, circa 1888
- Edgar A. Bowers, circa 1920
- John Robert Ayers, circa 1951
- William E. Hays, circa 1951
- Marie Elizabeth Howe, circa 1975
- John Stefanini
- Karen Spilka
- Tom Sannicandro
- Jack Patrick Lewis, 2017-current

== See also ==
- List of Massachusetts House of Representatives elections
- Other Middlesex County districts of the Massachusetts House of Representatives: 1st, 2nd, 3rd, 4th, 5th, 6th, 8th, 9th, 10th, 11th, 12th, 13th, 14th, 15th, 16th, 17th, 18th, 19th, 20th, 21st, 22nd, 23rd, 24th, 25th, 26th, 27th, 28th, 29th, 30th, 31st, 32nd, 33rd, 34th, 35th, 36th, 37th
- List of Massachusetts General Courts
- List of former districts of the Massachusetts House of Representatives

== Images ==
Portraits of legislators

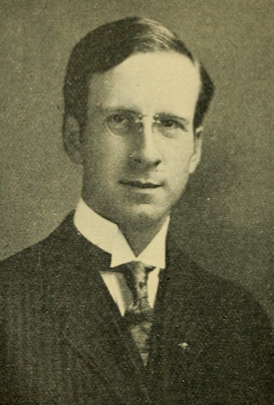
Frederick Hilton

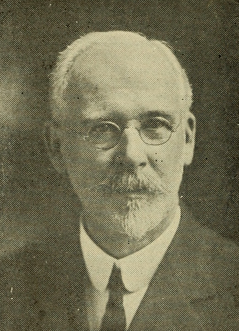
Bernard Merriam

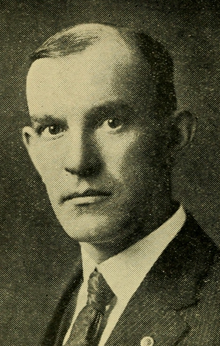
Edward Carey

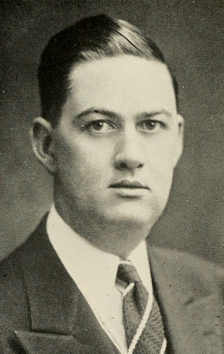
John Murray

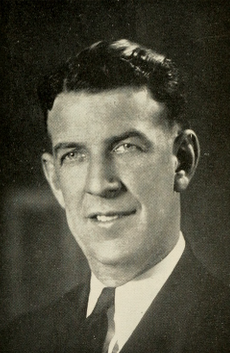
Leo Landry

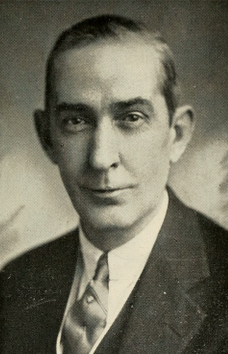
Thomas Flannery

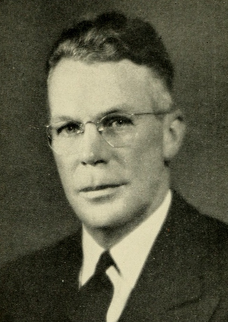
Charles Ferguson

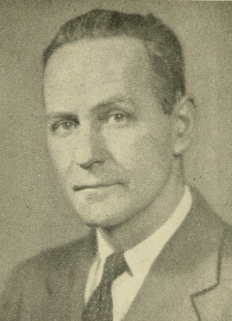
George Cousens

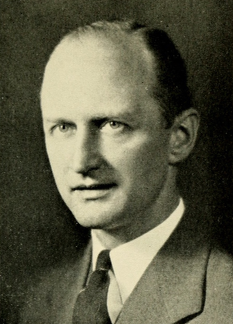
William Hays

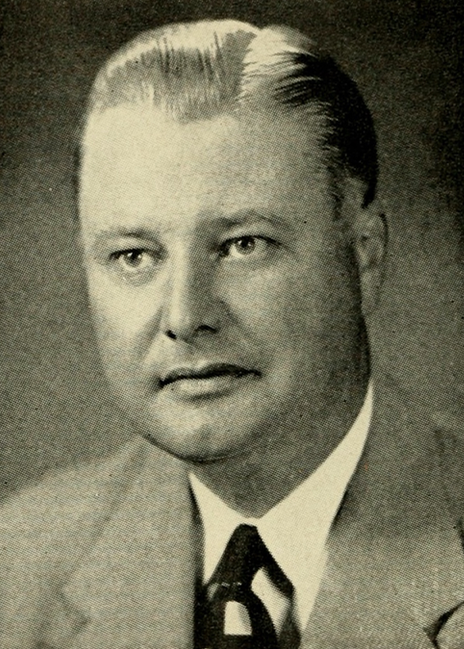
John Robert Ayers

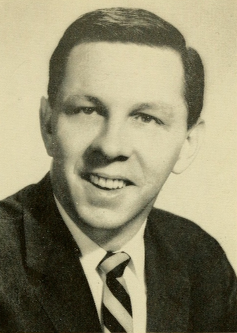
Donald Manning

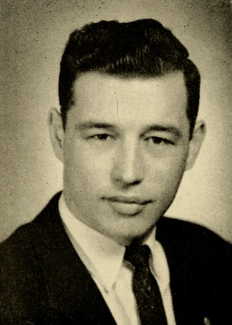
Richard Landry

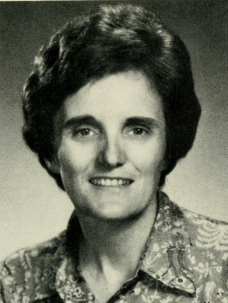
Marie Elizabeth Howe

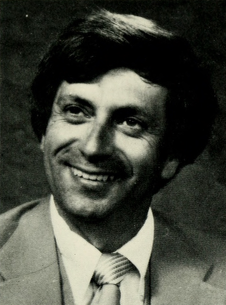
Andrew Rogers

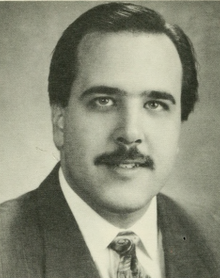
John Stefanini

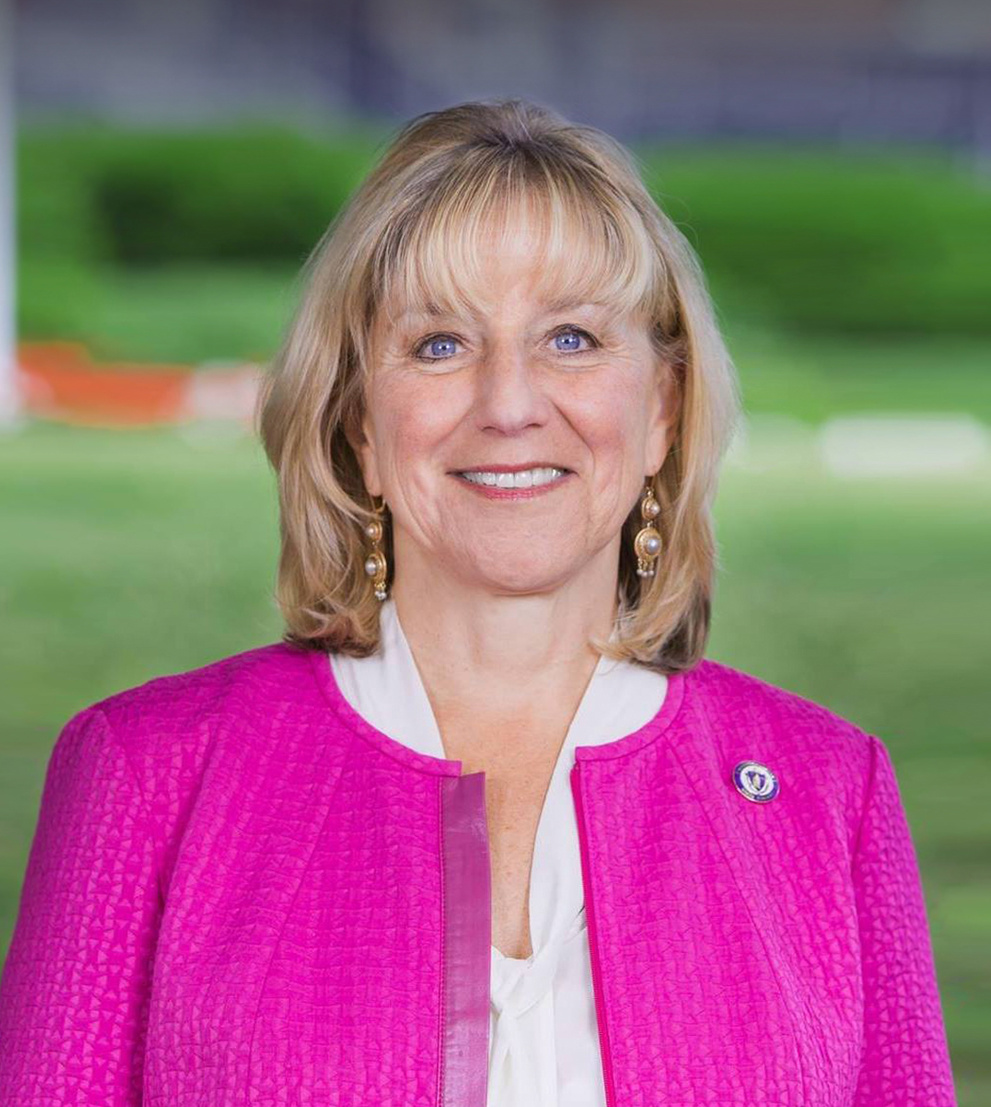
Karen Spilka

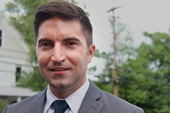
Jack Patrick Lewis
