= Steven D'Amico =

American politician

Member of the Massachusetts House of Representatives from the 4th Bristol district
- In office 2007–2011
- Preceded by: Philip Travis
- Succeeded by: Steve Howitt

Personal details
- Born: February 21, 1953 (age 73) Providence, Rhode Island
- Party: Democratic
- Education: University of Massachusetts Amherst
- Occupation: Politician

Steven J. D'Amico (born February 21, 1953, in Providence, Rhode Island) is an American politician who represented the 4th Bristol District in the Massachusetts House of Representatives from 2007 to 2011 and served as town meeting member in Seekonk, Massachusetts from 1989 to 1995.
