= June 2010 California elections =

- June 8, 2010

Elections were held in California on June 8, 2010. Five propositions and two special elections, one for a State Senate seat and the other for a State Assembly seat were on the ballot. Primary elections for all statewide offices, a seat to the United States Senate, all Californian seats to the House of Representatives, all of the seats of the State Assembly, and all even-numbered seats of the State Senate, along with the first round election for the nonpartisan Superintendent of Public Instruction were also held.

== Ballot Propositions ==
Five statewide propositions were on the ballot.

June 2010 California ballot propositions
Name	Description	Votes				Type
Name	Description	Yes	%	No	%	Type
Proposition 13	Exempts construction to seismically retrofit buildings from property tax reassessment.	4,473,249	84.98	790,899	15.02	Legislatively referred constitutional amendment
Proposition 14	Adopts a nonpartisan blanket primary system.	2,868,945	53.73	2,470,658	46.27	Legislatively referred constitutional amendment
Proposition 15	Repeals the state ban on public funding of campaigns, creates a program to publicly fund Secretary of State campaigns, and creates a biennial fee of $700 on lobbyists, lobbying firms, and lobbyist employers.	2,218,273	42.71	2,975,731	57.29	Legislatively referred state statute
Proposition 16	Requires a two-thirds majority to establish or expand public electricity providers.	2,526,544	47.25	2,820,135	52.75	Citizen-initiated constitutional amendment
Proposition 17	Allows car insurance companies to decrease or increase rates based on a driver's history of continuous car insurance coverage.	2,575,659	48.10	2,778,599	51.90	Citizen-initiated state statute
Source: California Secretary of State

Results by county

Amendment 13 results by county
Yes:
- 70–80%
- 80–90%

Amendment 14 results by county
Yes:
- 50–60%
- 60–70%
No:
- 50–60%

Amendment 15 results by county
Yes:
- 50–60%
- 60–70%
No:
- 50–60%
- 60–70%
- 70–80%

Amendment 16 results by county
Yes:
- 50–60%
- 60–70%
No:
- 50–60%
- 60–70%
- 70–80%

Amendment 17 results by county
Yes:
- 50–60%
No:
- 50–60%
- 60–70%
Tie:
- 50%

== Special elections ==
=== 37th State Senate district special election ===

The seat of the 37th State Senate district was vacated by John J. Benoit after he was appointed to be Riverside County supervisor on November 30, 2009.

==== Primary election ====
A primary election was held on April 13, 2010. Since no candidate won a majority, the candidates with the top votes for each party appeared on the ballots for the special election.

California's 37th State Senate district special primary, 2010
Party	Candidate	Votes	%
Republican	Bill Emmerson	39,875	41.76
Republican	Russ Bogh	20,957	21.95
Democratic	Justin Blake	13,289	13.92
Democratic	Anna Nevenic	8,076	8.46
Democratic	Arthur Guerrero	6,826	7.15
American Independent	Matt Monica	4,195	4.39
Republican	David W. Peters	2,267	2.37
Total votes		95,485	100.00
Turnout			20.39

==== Special election ====
37th State Senate district special election, 2010
Party	Candidate	Votes	%
Republican	Bill Emmerson	81,655	59.66
Democratic	Justin Blake	41,243	30.13
American Independent	Matt Monica	13,965	10.20
Total votes		136,863	100.00
Turnout			29.18
Republican hold			

=== 43rd State Assembly district special election ===

The seat of the 43rd State Assembly district was vacated by Paul Krekorian after he was elected to the Los Angeles City Council on December 8, 2009.

==== Primary election ====
A primary election was held on April 13, 2010. Since no candidate won a majority, the candidates with the top votes for each party appeared on the ballots for the special election.

California's 43rd State Assembly district special primary, 2010
Party	Candidate	Votes	%
Democratic	Mike Gatto	11,954	31.96
Republican	Sunder Ramani	11,634	31.10
Democratic	Nayiri Nahabedian	8,358	22.34
Democratic	Chahe Keuroghelian	5,462	14.60
Total votes		37,408	100.00
Turnout			21.97

==== Special election ====
California's 43rd State Assembly district special election, 2010
Party	Candidate	Votes	%
Democratic	Mike Gatto	23,733	58.58
Republican	Sunder Ramani	16,778	41.42
Total votes		40,511	100.00
Turnout			20.14
Democratic hold			

== See also ==
- List of California ballot propositions
- 2010 California gubernatorial election
- 2010 United States Senate election in California
- 2008 California elections
