= 2010 Massachusetts Question 1 =

Referendum repealing a sales tax on alcohol

Question 1
- No Sales Tax for Alcohol

Results
Choice	Votes	%
Yes	1,147,374	51.95%
No	1,061,406	48.05%
Valid votes	2,208,780	100.00%
Invalid or blank votes	0	0.00%
Total votes	2,208,780	100.00%

Yes
90–100%
70–80%
60–70%
50–60%
No
90–100%
80–90%
70–80%
60–70%
50–60%
Other
Tie
No votes

The No Sales Tax for Alcohol Question, also known as Question 1, was on the November 2, 2010 ballot in Massachusetts. The measure asked voters whether to repeal a sales tax on alcohol sales. The ballot measure for the 2010 ballot was added after the Massachusetts State Legislature increased the sales tax in the state from 5% to 6.25% and eliminated an exemption for alcohol sold in liquor stores.

The Measure passed with 52% of the vote thereby eliminating the sales tax on alcohol beginning January 1, 2011.

== Text of measure ==
=== Summary ===
The summary of the measure reads:

This proposed law would remove the Massachusetts sales tax on alcoholic beverages and alcohol, where the sale of such beverages and alcohol or their importation into the state is already subject to a separate excise tax under state law. The proposed law would take effect on January 1, 2011.

A YES VOTE would remove the state sales tax on alcoholic beverages and alcohol where their sale or importation into the state is subject to an excise tax under state law.

A NO VOTE would make no change in the state sales tax on alcoholic beverages and alcohol.

== Support ==
=== Arguments ===
- Liquor retailers in the state had argued that the 6.25 percent sales tax on alcohol is making sales decline, that more people are heading to New Hampshire to buy their alcohol, since that state is tax-free. According to retailers, liquor sales in Massachusetts have declined from 10 to 40 percent in the past year.

== Opposition ==
=== Opponents ===
- Senator Steven Tolman
- The Committee Against the Repeal of the Alcohol Tax
- Massachusetts Hospital Association

=== Arguments ===
- Alcohol is not a necessity and does not deserve a special tax exemption. The only goods in Massachusetts exempt from the sales tax are necessities like food, clothing, and prescriptions. If anything should be taxed, products like cigarettes and alcohol should be.
- The tax has brought in $93 million in the current fiscal year that has helped fund the operations of recovery high schools

=== Financing ===
The following are major contributors in opposition to the measure:

Contributor	Amount
Association For Behavioral Healthcare Inc	$30,000
The Health Foundation of Central MA	$10,000
Recovery Homes Collaborative, Inc	$9,000
Spectrum Health Systems, Inc	$6,000
Advocates, Inc.	$5,000
Bay Cove Human Services	$5,000
Behavioral Health Network	$5,000
CAB Health & Recovery Services, Inc	$5,000
Children's Hospital	$5,000
Community Healthlink	$5,000
High Point Treatment Center	$5,000
Northeast Hospitals	$5,000
North Suffolk Mental Health Assn.	$2,700

== Path to the ballot ==
The initiative's supporters believed their efforts cleared the signature gathering hurdle on November 18, 2009, gathering and submitting approximately 115,000 voter signatures Signatures were submitted to all local city and town clerks in the state. The initiative was reviewed by the Massachusetts Legislature. Since the Massachusetts Legislature did not approve of the initiative by the May 4, 2010 deadline, petition organizers had to obtain signatures from about 1/2 of 1% of voters who voted in the last governor election and submit them before or on July 7, 2010. According to the Massachusetts Secretary of State's office, that number amounted to 11,099 signatures. Sponsors turned in enough signatures for the ballot, therefore allowing voters to decide on the measure.
