= Mary Z. Connaughton =

American politician

Member of the Massachusetts Turnpike Authority Board of Directors
- In office September 2005 – October 2009

Personal details
- Born: August 3, 1960 (age 66) Boston Massachusetts
- Party: Republican
- Education: University of Massachusetts Amherst, BBA, BA

Mary Zarrilli Connaughton (born Mary Gina Zarrilli August 3, 1960 in Boston, Massachusetts) is a former board member of the Massachusetts Turnpike Authority. Connaughton was a candidate for Massachusetts Auditor in 2010.

== Political career ==
Connaughton started her political career in 2004 as a Republican candidate for state representative in the Seventh Middlesex District of Massachusetts. She lost that open-seat race to then Ashland School Board member Tom Sannicandro.

In September 2005, Connaughton was appointed by Governor Mitt Romney to the board of the Massachusetts Turnpike Authority. There, Connaughton has gained notoriety as an anti-toll activist for her area, but wanted higher tolls for Boston and Western Massachusetts, appearing on numerous television and radio programs to discuss issues pertaining to the Turnpike.

In January 2010, Connaughton announced the commencement of her campaign for Massachusetts State Auditor as the Republican candidate. The seat was to be vacated by Joe DeNucci (D), who announced he would retire at the end of his term. She challenged Suzanne Bump (D), the former Secretary of Labor and Workforce Development under Governor Deval Patrick (D), for the Auditor's position. Bump ultimately won the election by a narrow margin.

MA Auditor 2010 Election Results
Bump, Suzanne Dem 992,680 49%
Connaughton, Mary GOP 944,475 46%
Fortune, Nat Grn 105,965 5%

== Professional background ==
Connaughton is currently the COO and Director of Government Transparency of Pioneer Institute in Boston. She was a partner in the business development firm of Ascentage Group (formerly Henniker River Group) and an adjunct accounting instructor at Framingham State College. Additionally, she served on the Massachusetts Commission on Judicial Conduct.

Connaughton held the position of senior manager on the audit staff of Ernst and Young in the Entrepreneurial Services division and was Chief Financial Officer of the Massachusetts Lottery. Her other experience includes working as a financial consultant/CPA both independently and for a local firm and being chief financial officer of a privately held company. She was previously vice-chair of the Framingham Finance Committee and served on the board of directors of Commonwealth Corporation.

Connaughton earned her Master of Business Administration from Assumption College in 2009 and a Bachelor of Business Administration in Accounting and a Bachelor of Arts in English from the University of Massachusetts Amherst. She also spent two summers studying English literature at the Trinity College, Oxford University Summer Seminar program. She is a member of the Massachusetts Society of Certified Public Accountants.

== Personal life ==
Connaughton was born at St. Elizabeth's Medical Center in the Brighton neighborhood of Boston. She lives in Framingham, Massachusetts with her husband and two children.

Party political offices
Vacant Title last held by Michael Duffy	Republican nominee for Auditor of Massachusetts; 2010	Succeeded by Patricia Saint Aubin
