= 2010 Massachusetts Question 2 =

Question 2
- Massachusetts Comprehensive Permits and Regional Planning Initiative

Results
Choice	Votes	%
Yes	900,405	41.78%
No	1,254,759	58.22%
Valid votes	2,155,164	100.00%
Invalid or blank votes	0	0.00%
Total votes	2,155,164	100.00%

No
90–100%
80–90%
70–80%
60–70%
50–60%
Yes
70–80%
60–70%
50–60%
Other
Tie
No votes

The Massachusetts Comprehensive Permits and Regional Planning Initiative, also known as Question 2, appeared on the November 2, 2010 ballot in the state of Massachusetts as an initiative. Question 2 was rejected by the Massachusetts voters by 1,254,759 "No" votes to 900,405 "Yes" votes. The measure had been sponsored by Better Not Bigger, a local advocacy group in the state.

The proposed measure would have repealed a state law, the Comprehensive Permit Act (MGL ch. 40B), that allows an organization that is proposing to build government-subsidized housing that includes "low- or moderate-income units to apply for a single comprehensive permit from a city or town's zoning board of appeals." According to the official summary of the measure, the repeal would take effect on January 1, 2011. According to Chemaly, "It's not based on helping poor people. It's all about how can we sell as many units as possible and for them to still be federally and legally (dubbed) affordable"

Details of Chapter 40B include:

- It became a law in 1969.
- Allows developers to avoid local zoning limits if they agree to reserve some of their projects for moderate-income residents.
- About 25 percent of the units must be set aside for moderate-income residents to meet this requirement.
- Local areas can reject projects if 10 percent or more of their housing stock is deemed affordable.
- If local towns or cities are making progress toward said 10 percent mark, they can still reject projects.

== Legislative history ==
The initiative was reviewed by the Massachusetts Legislature. The Massachusetts Legislature did not approve of the initiative by the May 4, 2010 deadline, according to the Massachusetts Elections Division, leaving petition organizers to obtain additional signatures from about 1/2 of 1% of voters who voted in the last governor election and submit them before or on July 7, 2010. According to the Massachusetts Secretary of State's office, that number amounted to 11,099 signatures. The measure submitted enough signatures to be placed on the ballot.

== Text of measure ==
=== Summary ===
The summary of the measure reads:

This proposed law would repeal an existing state law that allows a qualified organization wishing to build government-subsidized housing that includes low- or moderate-income units to apply for a single comprehensive permit from a city or town's zoning board of appeals (ZBA), instead of separate permits from each local agency or official having jurisdiction over any aspect of the proposed housing. The repeal would take effect on January 1, 2011, but would not stop or otherwise affect any proposed housing that had already received both a comprehensive permit and a building permit for at least one unit ...

A YES VOTE would repeal the state law allowing the issuance of a single comprehensive permit to build housing that includes low- or moderate-income units.

A NO VOTE would make no change in the state law allowing issuance of such a comprehensive permit.

== Support ==
=== Supporters ===
- Affordable Housing Now-Yes on 2 is the main campaign for the measure.
- Bigger Not Better

=== Arguments ===
- Massachusetts has become the 3rd most expensive state in the country!
- Chapter 40B, has been in place for more than 40 years and is directly responsible for our lack of affordability.

== Opposition ==
=== Opponents ===
- The Campaign to Protect the Affordable Housing Law.
- Worcester Mayor Joseph C. O'Brien.

=== Financing ===
The following contributions have been made in opposition to the measure:

Contributor	Amount
Massachusetts Association of Realtors	$235,000.00
Citizens Housing and Planning Association	$100,000.00
Massachusetts Association of Community Development Corporations	$61,000
National Apartment Association	$50,000
Greater Boston Real Estate Board	$47,250
Home Builders Association of Massachusetts	$25,000

=== Arguments ===
- repealing the affordable housing law would immediately halt the creation of housing that is affordable to seniors and working families in many communities across the Commonwealth of Massachusetts.
