= 2010 California Proposition 16 =

Proposition 16
- June 8, 2010
- Local Electricity Providers

Results
Choice	Votes	%
Yes	2,526,544	47.25%
No	2,820,135	52.75%
Total votes	5,346,679	100.00%
County results
For
60–70%
50–60%
Against
70–80%
60–70%
50–60%

2010 California Proposition 16 in the California state elections, June 2010, was an initiative that would have amended the state constitution to require two-thirds supermajority voter approval before local governments could use public funds or issue bonds to establish or expand public electricity service or community choice aggregation. The proposition was rejected by an approximate 5 point margin.

Supporters of the proposition dubbed it the "Taxpayers Right to Vote Act". Campaign materials, including statewide network television advertisements, cited a $2.5 billion cost for proposed new public electricity projects, and said that voters should have the final say on how public funds are spent. According to the campaign committee's official financial disclosures, the Pacific Gas and Electric Company contributed $44.1 million of the committee's $44.2 million total receipts.

Opponents included municipal power agencies, which were prohibited by law from campaigning against it. Opponents cited a June 2008 study that found that customers of public electricity providers paid lower rates than customers of private utilities. The opposing campaign was outspent 500 to 1, and was conducted largely over the Internet and at local civic events.

== Results ==
The election was marked by low overall voter turnout, with a stronger turnout from Republican voters, due to several high-profile Republican primary contests on the same ballot, and few Democratic primary contests. The California Republican Party endorsed Proposition 16, while the California Democratic Party, Green Party of California, and Peace and Freedom Party opposed it, and the Libertarian Party of California took no position.

After the election, a wider, 16 point margin of defeat was noted in the northern and central California counties served by Pacific Gas & Electric, while other counties supported the proposition.

Proposition 16
Choice	Votes	%
For	2,526,544	47.25
Against	2,820,135	52.75
Total	5,346,679	100.00
Valid votes	5,346,679	94.55
Invalid/blank votes	308,134	5.45
Total votes	5,654,813	100.00
Registered voters/turnout	16,977,031	33.31
